= Icelandic Men's Football Cup =

- Founded: 1960
- Region: Iceland
- Teams: 72
- Qualifier for: UEFA Europa League
- Domestic cup: Icelandic Super Cup
- Current champions: Vestri (1st title)
- Most championships: KR (14 titles)
- 2026 Icelandic Cup

The Icelandic Men's Football Cup (Icelandic: Bikarkeppni karla í knattspyrnu - Mjólkurbikarinn) is a knock-out football cup competition in Iceland. The final is played at Laugardalsvöllur in mid-September. The winners qualify for the UEFA Europa League. The tournament was first played in 1960. Vestri are the 2025 champions.

== Winners ==
- 1960: KR
- 1961: KR
- 1962: KR
- 1963: KR
- 1964: KR
- 1965: Valur
- 1966: KR
- 1967: KR
- 1968: ÍBV
- 1969: ÍBA
- 1970: Fram
- 1971: Víkingur
- 1972: ÍBV
- 1973: Fram
- 1974: Valur
- 1975: Keflavik
- 1976: Valur
- 1977: Valur
- 1978: ÍA
- 1979: Fram
- 1980: Fram
- 1981: ÍBV
- 1982: ÍA
- 1983: ÍA
- 1984: ÍA
- 1985: Fram
- 1986: ÍA
- 1987: Fram
- 1988: Valur
- 1989: Fram
- 1990: Valur
- 1991: Valur
- 1992: Valur
- 1993: ÍA
- 1994: KR
- 1995: KR
- 1996: ÍA
- 1997: Keflavik
- 1998: ÍBV
- 1999: KR
- 2000: ÍA
- 2001: Fylkir
- 2002: Fylkir
- 2003: ÍA
- 2004: Keflavik
- 2005: Valur
- 2006: Keflavik
- 2007: FH
- 2008: KR
- 2009: Breiðablik
- 2010: FH
- 2011: KR
- 2012: KR
- 2013: Fram
- 2014: KR
- 2015: Valur
- 2016: Valur
- 2017: ÍBV
- 2018: Stjarnan
- 2019: Víkingur
- 2020: Cancelled
- 2021: Víkingur
- 2022: Víkingur
- 2023: Víkingur
- 2024: KA
- 2025: Vestri
- 2026: Breiðablik

== Performance by club ==
Club	Titles	Winning years
KR	14	1960, 1961, 1962, 1963, 1964, 1966, 1967, 1994, 1995, 1999, 2008, 2011, 2012, 2014
Valur	11	1965, 1974, 1976, 1977, 1988, 1990, 1991, 1992, 2005, 2015, 2016
ÍA	9	1978, 1982, 1983, 1984, 1986, 1993, 1996, 2000, 2003
Fram	8	1970, 1973, 1979, 1980, 1985, 1987, 1989, 2013
ÍBV	5	1968, 1972, 1981, 1998, 2017
Víkingur	5	1971, 2019, 2021, 2022, 2023
Keflavik	4	1975, 1997, 2004, 2006
Fylkir	2	2001, 2002
FH	2	2007, 2010
Breiðablik	2	2009, 2026
ÍBA	1	1969
Stjarnan	1	2018
KA	1	2024
Vestri	1	2025

== Lost finals by club ==
Club	#	Losing Years
Fram	10	1960, 1962, 1977, 1981, 1984, 1986, 1995, 2002, 2005, 2009
ÍA	10	1961, 1963, 1964, 1965, 1969, 1974, 1975, 1976, 1999, 2021
ÍBV	7	1970, 1980, 1983, 1996, 1997, 2000, 2016
Keflavík	6	1973, 1982, 1985, 1988, 1993, 2014
FH	6	1972, 1991, 2003, 2017, 2019, 2022
KR	5	1989, 1990, 2006, 2010, 2015
KA	4	1992, 2001, 2004, 2023
Valur	4	1966, 1978, 1979, 2025
Fjölnir	2	2007, 2008
Stjarnan	2	2012, 2013
Breiðablik	2	1971, 2018
Vikingur	2	1967, 2024
Grindavík	1	1994
KR-b	1	1968
Leiftur	1	1998
Víðir	1	1987
Þór	1	2011
