= 1991 Icelandic Cup =

Mjólkurbikarinn

Tournament details
- Country: Iceland

Final positions
- Champions: Valur
- Runners-up: FH

The 1991 Icelandic Cup was the 32nd edition of the National Football Cup.

It took place between 21 May 1991 and 28 August 1991, with the final replay played at Laugardalsvöllur in Reykjavík. The cup was important, as winners qualified for the UEFA Cup Winners' Cup (if a club won both the league and the cup, the defeated finalists would take their place in the Cup Winners' Cup).

The 10 clubs from the 1. Deild entered in the last 16, with clubs from lower tiers entering in the three preliminary rounds. Teams played one-legged matches. In case of a draw, a penalty shoot-out took place (there were no replays, unlike in previous years).

For the second year running, the final finished in a draw after extra time. In contrast to other rounds, a replay took place. Valur won their seventh Icelandic Cup, and so qualified for Europe.

== Preliminary round ==
| Team 1 | Score | Team 2 |
|---|---|---|
21 May 1991
| Valur Reyðarfjörður | 3−2 | KSH |

== First round ==
| Team 1 | Score | Team 2 |
|---|---|---|
28 May 1991
| þrottur Norðfjörður | 2−1 | Huginn |
| Huginn | 5−1 | Valur Reyðarfjörður |
| Austri | 2−3 | Einherji |
| IK | 1−2 | Dalvík/Reynir |
| Völsungur | 3−1 | Magni Grenivík |
| Kormákur | 2−0 | Neisti H. |
| Skallagrímur | 2−3 | Bolungarvík |
| Leiftur | 2−1 | Víkingur Ó. |
| þróttur | 5–1 | Snæfell |
| Reynir Sandgerði | 0−7 | Grindavík |
| Reynir Árskógsströnd | 4−3 | Eyjafjarðar |
| Leiknir Reykjavík | 0−2 | Haukar |
| Sindri | 2−1 | Leiknir F. |
| Árvakur R. | 3−2 | Selfoss |
| Afturelding | 1−5 | Grótta |
| Stokkseyri | 4–2 | TBR |
| Njarðvík | 1−4 | Fylkir |
29 May 1991
| Vikverji | 3−2 | Ármann |
6 June 1991
| ÍR | 0–4 | Keflavík |

== Second round ==
| Team 1 | Score | Team 2 |
|---|---|---|
4 June 1991
| þrottur Norðfjörður | 8–0 | Sindri |
| Einherji | 3–4 | Huginn |
7 June 1991
| ÍA | 5–0 | Árvakur R. |
| Dalvík | 2−1 | Völsungur |
8 June 1991
| Stokkseyri | 1−9 | IK |
| Vikverji | 1−4 | þróttur |
| Bolungarvík | 0–5 | Fylkir |
| KS | 1–6 | þór Akureyri |
| Kormákur | 0–1 | Leiftur |
| Haukar | 6–3 | Grótta |
| Reynir Árskógsströnd | 1–2 | Tindastóll |
10 June 1991
| Keflavík | 1–0 | Grindavík |

== Third round ==
| Team 1 | Score | Team 2 |
|---|---|---|
24 June 1991
| þór Akureyri | 3−0 | Tindastóll |
25 June 1991
| Huginn | 1−4 | þrottur Norðfjörður |
| Dalvík | 3−4 | Leiftur |
| þróttur | 3–4 | Keflavík |
| ÍA | 2–1 | Fylkir |
| Haukar | 0−1 | IK |

== Fourth round ==
- Entry of ten teams from the 1. Deild

| Team 1 | Score | Team 2 |
|---|---|---|
9 July 1991
| IK | 1−2 | Valur |
| Fram | 1−2 | Víðir |
| Leiftur | 1−1 (a.e.t.); 5−3 (pen) | þrottur Norðfjörður |
| FH | 4−2 | ÍBV |
10 July 1991
| Stjarnan | 3−0 | KA |
| þór Akureyri | 1−1 (a.e.t.); 5−3 (pen) | Keflavík |
| Breiðablik | 2−0 | Víkingur |
| KR | 2−0 | ÍA |

== Quarter-finals ==
| Team 1 | Score | Team 2 |
|---|---|---|
25 July 1991
| Leiftur | 1−2 | FH |
| Víðir | 3−2 | Stjarnan |
| Valur | 1−1 (a.e.t.); 4−3 (pen) | Breiðablik |
| þór Akureyri | 4−2 | KR |

== Semi-finals ==
| Team 1 | Score | Team 2 |
|---|---|---|
8 August 1991
| Víðir | 1−3 | FH |
| þór Akureyri | 0−0 (a.e.t.); 3−4 (pen) | Valur |

== Final ==
25 August 1991

| Valur | 1–1 (a.e.t.) | FH |
|---|---|---|
| Már Másson 79' | Report | Magnusson 85' |

Laugardalsvöllur, Reykjavík
Attendance: 2,740
Referee: Sveinn Sveinsson

=== Replay ===
28 August 1991

| FH | 0–1 | Valur |
|---|---|---|
| | Report | Gylfasson 50' |

Laugardalsvöllur, Reykjavík
Attendance: 3,351
Referee: Svein Sveinsson

Valur won their seventh Icelandic Cup, and qualified for the 1992–93 European Cup Winners' Cup.

== See also ==
- 1991 Úrvalsdeild
- Icelandic Men's Football Cup
