= 1973 Icelandic Cup =

Bikarkeppni karla

Tournament details
- Country: Iceland

Final positions
- Champions: Fram
- Runners-up: Keflavík

The 1973 Icelandic Cup was the 14th edition of the National Football Cup.

It took place between 13 June 1973 and 13 September 1973, with the final played at Laugardalsvöllur in Reykjavík. The cup was important, as winners qualified for the UEFA Cup Winners' Cup (if a club won both the league and the cup, the defeated finalists would take their place in the Cup Winners' Cup).

Clubs from the 1. Deild entered in the last 16, with clubs from lower tiers entering in the three preliminary rounds. Teams played one-legged matches. In case of a draw, the match was replayed at the opposition's ground.

Fram Reykjavík won their second Icelandic Cup, beating Keflavík in the final. The club therefore qualified for Europe.

== First round ==
Team 1	Team 2	Result
Valur Reyðarfjörður	Leiknir Fáskrúðsfjörður	0–4
þrottur Norðfjörður	Huginn Seyðisfjörður	3–0

== Second round ==
Team 1	Team 2	Result
Haukar Hafnarfjörður	Víðir Garður	3–2
Ármann Reykjavík	Hrönn	12–0
Afturelding Mosfellsbær	UMF Selfoss	0–3
Stjarnan Garðabær	þrottur Reykjavík	2–3
Bolungarvík	ÍB Isafjörður	0–2
Fylkir Reykjavík	UMF Njarðvík	6–7
Spyrnir	Leiknir Fáskrúðsfjörður	forfeit
þrottur Norðfjörður	Austri Eskifjörður	6–1

== Third round ==
- Entry of eight teams from the 2. Deild

Team 1	Team 2	Result
UMF Grindavík (D2)	UMF Selfoss	0–4
þrottur Reykjavík	Ármann Reykjavík	2–1
UMF Skallagrímur (D2)	ÍB Isafjörður	0–4
Völsungur Húsavík (D2)	KS Sarafjörður (D2)	2–1
Víkingur Reykjavík (D2)	Reynir Sandgerði (D2)	9–0
Grótta Seltjarnarnes (D2)	Haukar Hafnarfjörður	0–3
FH Hafnarfjörður (D2)	UMF Njarðvík	1–0
þrottur Norðfjörður	Leiknir Fáskrúðsfjörður	3–2

== Fourth round ==
- Entry of eight teams from the 1. Deild

Team 1	Team 2	Result
FH Hafnarfjörður	þrottur Norðfjörður	2–0
Fram Reykjavík (D1)	Haukar Hafnarfjörður	5–1
UMF Selfoss	ÍA Akranes (D1)	2–3
Völsungur Húsavík	KR Reykjavík (D1)	2–3
Keflavík (D1)	Breiðablik Kópavogur (D1)	5–0
Valur Reykjavík (D1)	ÍBV Vestmannaeyjar (D1)	0–1
ÍB Isafjörður	ÍBA Akureyri (D1)	1–2
þrottur Reykjavík	Víkingur Reykjavík	0–2 (replayed after 2–2 draw)

== Quarter finals ==
Team 1	Team 2	Result
KR Reykjavík	ÍBV Vestmannaeyjar	1–2
ÍA Akranes	ÍBA Akureyri	1–0 (replayed after 2–2 draw)
Keflavík	FH Hafnarfjörður (D2)	2–0
Víkingur Reykjavík (D2)	Fram Reykjavík	0–3

== Semi finals ==
Team 1	Team 2	Result
Fram Reykjavík	ÍBV Vestmannaeyjar	4–0
ÍA Akranes	Keflavík	0–3

== Final ==
12 September 1973

Fram Reykjavík	2–1	Keflavík
Pétursson; Geirsson	Report	Johannsson

Laugardalsvöllur, Reykjavík
- Fram Reykjavík won their second Icelandic Cup and qualified for the 1974–75 European Cup Winners' Cup.

== See also ==
- 1973 Úrvalsdeild
- Icelandic Men's Football Cup
