= 1981 Icelandic Cup =

Bikarkeppni karla

Tournament details
- Country: Iceland

Final positions
- Champions: ÍBV
- Runners-up: Fram

The 1981 Icelandic Cup was the 22nd edition of the National Football Cup.

It took place between 26 May 1980 and 30 August 1981, with the final played at Laugardalsvöllur in Reykjavík. The cup was important, as winners qualified for the UEFA Cup Winners' Cup (if a club won both the league and the cup, the defeated finalists would take their place in the Cup Winners' Cup).

The 10 clubs from the 1. Deild entered in the last 16, with clubs from lower tiers entering in the three preliminary rounds. Teams played one-legged matches. In case of a draw, the match was replayed at the opposition's ground.

The final was a rematch of the previous season - Fram and ÍBV meeting, but on this occasion it was the club from Vestmannaeyjar who qualified for Europe. IBV won the Icelandic Cup for the fourth time.

== First round ==
Team 1	Score	Team 2
26 May 1981
Fylkir	1–0	ÍBÍ
Afturelding	5–2	Selfoss
þrottur Norðfjörður	9–7	Sindri
Leiknir F.	3–2	Einherji
Grótta	0–4	Grindavík
Haukar	1–0	HV
Víkingur Ó.	2–3	Ármann Reykjavík
Hamar	3–8	Reynir Sandgerði
27 May 1981
þróttur	4–3	Stjarnan

== Second round ==
Team 1	Score	Team 2
10 June 1981
Reynir Sandgerði	0–3	þróttur
Fylkir	2–0	Snæfell
Víðir	3–0	IK
Leiftur Ólafsfjörður	2–1	Héraðssamband
þrottur Norðfjörður	8–0	Leiknir F.
Huginn	3–0	Austri Eskifjörður
Arroðinn A.	4–3	Völsungur
Tindastóll	4–1	Dagsbrún
Magni Grenivík	0–1	KS
Keflavík	7–0	Skallagrímur
Ármann Reykjavík	1–3	Afturelding
Haukar	2–3	Grindavík

== Third round ==
Team 1	Score	Team 2
16 June 1981
þrottur Norðfjörður	3–0	Huginn
Afturelding	1–2	þróttur
Fylkir	4–0	Grindavík
Leiftur	2–1	Tindastóll
Arroðinn A.	2–1	KS
Víðir	0–3	Keflavík

== Fourth round ==
- Entry of ten teams from the 1. Deild

Team 1	Score	Team 2
1 July 1981
Leiftur	0–1	þór Akureyri
KA	2–3	ÍBV
Fylkir	1–0	Breiðablik
ÍA	2–0	Valur
Arroðinn A.	0–2	FH
þróttur	3–0	þrottur Norðfjörður
Fram	4–1	KR
Keflavík	4–1	Víkingur

== Quarter-finals ==
Team 1	Score	Team 2
22 July 1981
ÍA	0–5	ÍBV
Fram	1–0	Keflavík
Fylkir	1–0	þór Akureyri
FH	1–2	þróttur

== Semi-finals ==
Team 1	Score	Team 2
5 August 1981
Fram	1–0	Fylkir
þróttur	0–1	ÍBV

== Final ==
31 August 1981

ÍBV	3–2	Fram
þorleifson, Hallgrimsson	Report	Geirsson,

Laugardalsvöllur, Reykjavík
- ÍBV won their fourth Icelandic Cup and qualified for the 1982–83 European Cup Winners' Cup.

== See also ==
- 1981 Úrvalsdeild
- Icelandic Men's Football Cup
