= 1989 Icelandic Cup =

Mjólkurbikarinn

Tournament details
- Country: Iceland

Final positions
- Champions: Fram
- Runners-up: KR

The 1989 Icelandic Cup was the 30th edition of the National Football Cup.

It took place between 29 May 1989 and 27 August 1989, with the final played at Laugardalsvöllur in Reykjavík. The cup was important, as winners qualified for the UEFA Cup Winners' Cup (if a club won both the league and the cup, the defeated finalists would take their place in the Cup Winners' Cup).

The 10 clubs from the 1. Deild entered in the last 16, with clubs from lower tiers entering in the three preliminary rounds. Teams played one-legged matches. In case of a draw, a penalty shoot-out took place (there were no replays, unlike in previous years).

Fram won their seventh Icelandic Cup, beating KR Reykjavík in the final, and so qualifying for Europe.

== First round ==
Team 1	Score	Team 2
29 May 1989
Grótta	1–5	ÍBV
30 May 1989
Leiftur	1–0	Reynir Árskógsströnd
Ægir	0–2	Njarðvík
Skallagrímur	1–2	Breiðablik
Leiknir F.	2–0	Sindri
Höttur	3–2	Valur Reyðarfjörður
Huginn	2–2 (a.e.t.); 6−5 (pen)	Einherji
KS	5–1	Dalvík
Völsungur	1–0	Magni Grenivík
Ernir	0–1	Augnablik
Víðir	0–0 (a.e.t.); 5−4 (pen)	Snæfell
Hafnir	3–1	Afturelding
31 May 1989
IK	2–1	ÍR
Hvöt	0–7	Tindastóll
þróttur	2–0	Haukar
1 June 1989
Grindavík	3–1	Hamar
Vikverji	7–4 (a.e.t.)	Ármann
þrottur Norðfjörður	2–0	Austri

== Second round ==
Team 1	Score	Team 2
11 June 1989
Reynir Sandgerði	0–7	Stjarnan
Augnablik	10–2	Hafnir
Leiftur	1–2	Völsungur
Höttur	2–4	Leiknir F.
Víðir	3–1	IK
þróttur	3–0	Njarðvík
ÍBV	6–0	Stokkseyri
Árvakur H.	0–1	Vikverji
Selfoss	6–0	Víkingur Ó.
þrottur Norðfjörður	4–4 (a.e.t.); 0−3 (pen)	Huginn
Tindastóll	1–0	KS
Grindavík	3–2	Breiðablik

== Third round ==
Team 1	Score	Team 2
19 June 1989
þróttur	4–0	Vikverji
20 June 1989
Grindavík	0–1	Víðir
21 June 1989
Tindastóll	3–2	Völsungur
Augnablik	1–13	ÍBV
Stjarnan	0–1	Selfoss
Leiknir F.	0–3	Huginn

== Fourth round ==
- Entry of ten teams from the 1. Deild

Team 1	Score	Team 2
4 July 1989
Valur	2–1 (a.e.t.)	Víkingur
þróttur	5–2 (a.e.t.)	Huginn
Þór Akureyri	0–1 (a.e.t.)	ÍBV
5 July 1989
Víðir	0–0 (a.e.t.); 5−4 (pen)	Selfoss
Tindastóll	2–2 (a.e.t.); 1−4 (pen)	KR
FH	1–6	ÍA
KA	0–1	Fram
Fylkir	0–2 (a.e.t.)	Keflavík

== Quarter-finals ==
Team 1	Score	Team 2
17 July 1989
þróttur	2–3	Keflavík
18 July 1989
Valur	0–1	KR
ÍA	2–4	ÍBV
Víðir	1–2	Fram

== Semi-finals ==
Team 1	Score	Team 2
9 August 1989
Keflavík	3–4	Fram
ÍBV	2–3	KR

== Final ==
27 August 1989

Fram	3–1	KR
Steinsson 10', 28'; Ormslev 17'	Report	Pétursson 14'

Laugardalsvöllur, Reykjavík
Attendance: 4,991
Referee: Oli Olsen
- Fram won their seventh Icelandic Cup, and qualified for the 1990–91 European Cup Winners' Cup.

== See also ==
- 1989 Úrvalsdeild
- Icelandic Men's Football Cup
