= 1974 Icelandic Cup =

Bikarkeppni karla

Tournament details
- Country: Iceland

Final positions
- Champions: Valur
- Runners-up: ÍA

The 1974 Icelandic Cup was the 15th edition of the National Football Cup.

It took place between 12 June 1974 and 14 September 1974, with the final played at Laugardalsvöllur in Reykjavík. The cup was important, as winners qualified for the UEFA Cup Winners' Cup (if a club won both the league and the cup, the defeated finalists would take their place in the Cup Winners' Cup).

Clubs from the 1. Deild entered in the last 16, with clubs from lower tiers entering in the three preliminary rounds. Teams played one-legged matches. In case of a draw, the match was replayed at the opposition's ground.

Valur won their second Icelandic Cup, beating ÍA in the final. The club therefore qualified for Europe.

== First round ==
Team 1	Score	Team 2
17 July 1974
Austri Eskifjörður	0–3	Leiknir F.
Þróttur Neskaupstað	2–1	Valur Reyðarfjörður

== Second round ==
Team 1	Score	Team 2
12 June 1974
ÍR	3–1	Stjarnan
19 June 1974
Grótta	3–4	Selfoss
17 July 1974
Höttur	3–5	Huginn
Leiknir F.	5–6	Þróttur Neskaupstað
Völsungur	2–0	KS
ÍBÍ	2–0	Stefnir
Skallagrímur	0–3	Víkingur Ó.
Leiftur Ólafsfjörður	3–1	UMS Skagafjördur

== Third round ==
- Entry of eight teams from the 2. Deild

Team 1	Score	Team 2
17 July 1974
Breiðablik	9–0	Víðir
þróttur	1–2	Ármann Reykjavík
FH	0–2	Haukar
ÍR	0–2	Selfoss
18 July 1974
Víkingur Ó.	4–2	ÍBÍ
24 July 1974
Huginn	0–3	Þróttur Neskaupstað
Völsungur	7–1	Leiftur Ólafsfjörður
Leiknir Reykjavík	0–3	Fylkir

== Fourth round ==
- Entry of eight teams from the 1. Deild

Team 1	Score	Team 2
31 July 1974
Ármann Reykjavík	0–7	KR
ÍBA	2–3	Víkingur
Haukar	1–8	Valur
Völsungur	1–0	Þróttur Neskaupstað
Víkingur Ó.	1–3	ÍA
Selfoss	0–1	Keflavík
Fram	4–0	Fylkir
ÍBV	3–1	Breiðablik

== Quarter-finals ==
Team 1	Score	Team 2
14 August 1974
ÍBV	0–2	Völsungur
ÍA	2–0	Fram
Víkingur	3–2	KR
Keflavík	1–3	Valur

== Semi-finals ==
Team 1	Score	Team 2
28 August 1974
Völsungur	0–2	ÍA
14 September 1974
Víkingur	1–2^{1}	Valur

^{1} The match was replayed after a 2–2 draw.

== Final ==
14 September 1974

Valur	4–1	ÍA
Björnsson; A. Eðvaldsson; J. Eðvaldsson; Alfonsson	Report	Thordarson

Laugardalsvöllur, Reykjavík
- Valur won their second Icelandic Cup and qualified for the 1975–76 European Cup Winners' Cup.

== See also ==
- 1974 Úrvalsdeild
- Icelandic Men's Football Cup
