= 1972 Icelandic Cup =

Bikarkeppni karla

Tournament details
- Country: Iceland

Final positions
- Champions: ÍBV
- Runners-up: FH

The 1972 Icelandic Cup was the 13th edition of the National Football Cup.

It took place between 19 June 1972 and 12 November 1972, with the final played at Melavöllur in Reykjavík.

The Cup was important, as the winner qualified for the UEFA Cup Winners' Cup. (If a club won both the league and the cup, the losing finalists would take their place in the Cup Winners' Cup).

Clubs from the 1. Deild did not enter until the last 16, while clubs from lower divisions had already played 3 preliminary rounds. In case of a draw, the match was replayed at the ground of the other team.

ÍBV Vestmannaeyjar won their second Icelandic Cup, after winning the 1968 Icelandic Cup and beating 2. Deild club FH Hafnarfjörður in the final.

== First round ==
Team 1	Team 2	Result
Austri	Spyrnir	4 - 0
UMF Tindastóll	Íþróttafélagið Völsungur	1 - 6

== Second round ==
Team 1	Team 2	Result
Víðir	Reynir Sandgerði	0 - 3
UMF Selfoss	Fylkir	2 - 0
Ungmennafélag Njarðvíkur	UMF Grindavík	5 - 0
Ungmennafélagið Skallagrímur	Bolungarvík	forfeit
þrottur Norðfjörður	Austri	3 - 0
KS Siglufjörður	Leiftur Ólafsfjörður	5 - 1
ÍB Akureyri	Íþróttafélagið Völsungur	4 - 2
Íþróttafélagið Huginn	Leiknir Fáskrúðsfjörður	2 - 3

== Third round ==
Team 1	Team 2	Result
Ungmennafélag Njarðvíkur	Reynir Sandgerði	4 - 0
Armann Reykjavík	Hrönn	4 - 2
ÍB Isafjörður	Ungmennafélagið Skallagrímur	2 - 0
Knattspyrnufélagið Þróttur	UMF Selfoss	2 - 1
ÍB Akureyri	KS Siglufjörður	6 - 0
Stjarnan Garðabær	FH Hafnarfjörður	1 - 2
þrottur Norðfjörður	Leiknir Fáskrúðsfjörður	4 - 3
Haukar		bye

== Last 16 ==
- Entry of the 8 teams from the 1. Deild

Team 1	Team 2	Result
ÍB Isafjörður	FH Hafnarfjörður	2 - 3
þrottur Norðfjörður	Keflavík ÍF (D1)	0 - 2
Víkingur Reykjavík (D1)	Ungmennafélag Njarðvíkur	5 - 1
KR Reykjavík (D1)	Fram Reykjavík (D1)	2 - 1
Breiðablik UBK (D1)	Haukar	0 - 1
ÍB Akureyri	ÍBV Vestmannaeyjar (D1)	0 - 3
Knattspyrnufélagið Þróttur	ÍA Akranes (D1)	1 - 3
Armann Reykjavík	Valur Reykjavík (D1)	0 - 1

== Quarter finals ==
Team 1	Team 2	Result
ÍBV Vestmannaeyjar	Víkingur Reykjavík	4 - 1
FH Hafnarfjörður (D2)	Haukar (D2)	3 - 2
KR Reykjavík	Keflavík ÍF	2 - 4
Valur Reykjavík	ÍA Akranes	2 - 1

== Semi finals ==
Team 1	Team 2	Result
ÍBV Vestmannaeyjar	Valur Reykjavík	4 - 0
Keflavík ÍF (D2)	FH Hafnarfjörður	2 - 0 (replayed after 0–0 draw)

== Final ==
12 November 1972

ÍBV Vestmannaeyjar	2–0	FH Hafnarfjörður (D2)
Juliusson,	Report

Melavöllur, Reykjavík
- ÍBV Vestmannaeyjar won their second Icelandic Cup and qualified for the 1973–74 European Cup Winners' Cup.

== See also ==
- 1972 Úrvalsdeild
- Icelandic Cup
