= 1982 Icelandic Cup =

Bikarkeppni karla

Tournament details
- Country: Iceland

Final positions
- Champions: ÍA
- Runners-up: Keflavík

The 1982 Icelandic Cup was the 23rd edition of the National Football Cup.

It took place between 26 May 1980 and 29 August 1982, with the final played at Laugardalsvöllur in Reykjavík. The cup was important, as winners qualified for the UEFA Cup Winners' Cup (if a club won both the league and the cup, the defeated finalists would take their place in the Cup Winners' Cup).

The 10 clubs from the 1. Deild entered in the last 16, with clubs from lower tiers entering in the three preliminary rounds. Teams played one-legged matches. In case of a draw, the match was replayed at the opposition's ground.

ÍA beat Keflavík, and so qualified for the UEFA Cup Winners' Cup.

== First round ==
Team 1	Score	Team 2
26 May 1982
Bolungarvík	2–3	Grundarfjörður
HV	0–2	Víkingur Ó.
Grindavík	3–1	Stokkseyri
Hekla Hella	0–12	Njarðvík
Víðir	7–0	Hamar
Skallagrímur	0–1	FH
IK	4–3	Stjarnan
Reynir Hnífsdalur	0–5	Augnablik
Höttur	0–3	Einherji
Reynir Sandgerði	1–0	Fylkir
Huginn	7–1	Valur Reyðarfjörður
Sindri	0–6	þrottur Norðfjörður
Haukar	0–1	Ármann
Afturelding	3–1	Selfoss
Snæfell	1–2	þróttur

== Second round ==
Team 1	Score	Team 2
8 June 1982
Reynir Sandgerði	2–0	Augnablik
þór Akureyri	2–1	KS
Völsungur	8–0	Arroðinn A.
Ármann	3–2	Grindavík
Austri Eskifjörður	2–3	Huginn
þróttur	3–1	Víkingur Ó.
Dagsbrún	1–5	Leiftur
Grundarfjörður	1–3	Afturelding
IK	2–1	FH
Einherji	2–1	þrottur Norðfjörður
Njarðvík	0–3	Víðir
Tindastóll	5–1	Magni Grenivík

== Third round ==
Team 1	Score	Team 2
22 June 1982
þróttur	3–1	Afturelding
Ármann	0–1	Víðir
Reynir Sandgerði	1–0	IK
Huginn	5–0	Einherji
Tindastóll	0–1	Völsungur
þór Akureyri	7–2	Leiftur

== Fourth round ==
- Entry of ten teams from the 1. Deild

Team 1	Score	Team 2
7 July 1982
Huginn	0–4	Reynir Sandgerði
Víðir	0–2	Keflavík
þróttur	1–5	ÍA
ÍBV Vestmannaeyjar	1–4	Fram
þór Akureyri	1–3	Breiðablik
KR	2–1	Valur
Völsungur	1–2	Víkingur
8 July 1982
KA	3–1	ÍBÍ

== Quarter-finals ==
Team 1	Score	Team 2
21 July 1982
Keflavík	3–0	Fram
Breiðablik	1–2	ÍA
KR	1–0	Reynir Sandgerði
KA	1–3	Víkingur

== Semi-finals ==
Team 1	Score	Team 2
11 August 1982
Keflavík	1–0	KR
Víkingur	1–2	ÍA

== Final ==
29 August 1982

ÍA	2–1	Keflavík
Ingolfsson; Sveinsson	Report	Margeirsson

Laugardalsvöllur, Reykjavík
- ÍA won their second Icelandic Cup and qualified for the 1983–84 European Cup Winners' Cup.

== See also ==
- 1982 Úrvalsdeild
- Icelandic Men's Football Cup
