= 1987 Icelandic Cup =

Mjólkurbikarinn

Tournament details
- Country: Iceland

Final positions
- Champions: Fram
- Runners-up: Víðir

The 1987 Icelandic Cup was the 28th edition of the National Football Cup.

It took place between 27 May 1987 and 30 August 1987, with the final played at Laugardalsvöllur in Reykjavík. The cup was important, as winners qualified for the UEFA Cup Winners' Cup (if a club won both the league and the cup, the defeated finalists would take their place in the Cup Winners' Cup).

The 10 clubs from the 1. Deild entered in the last 16, with clubs from lower tiers entering in the three preliminary rounds. Teams played one-legged matches. In case of a draw, a penalty shoot-out took place (there were no replays, unlike in previous years).

Fram won their sixth Icelandic Cup, beating Víðir in the final, and so qualifying for Europe.

== First round ==
Team 1	Score	Team 2
27 May 1987
Augnablik	3−1	Hafnir
Njarðvík	0−0 (a.e.t.); 6−7 (pen)	Afturelding
þrottur Norðfjörður	4−1	Hrafnkell Fr.
Valur Reyðarfjörður	1−4	Höttur
Tindastóll	1−3	KS
Leiftur	10−0	Neisti H.
Skallagrímur	3−2	Snæfell
Huginn	2−1	Austri Eskifjörður
Leiknir Reykjavík	11−0	Léttir
Ármann	1−3	Vikverji
Reynir Sandgerði	5−1	Árvakur R.
Hamar	1−2	Grótta
ÍR	4−1	IK
28 May 1987
þróttur	3−1	Breiðablik
Víkingur	2−0	Haukar

== Second round ==
Team 1	Score	Team 2
10 June 1987
Augnablik	1–2	Stjarnan
ÍBV	2–1	Fylkir
Víkingur	3−1	þróttur
Höttur	1−3	Einherji
KS	7−0	Svarfdælir
þrottur Norðfjörður	5−0	Huginn
ÍR	1–0	Skotfélag
Leiftur	1–0	Magni Grenivík
Selfoss	5–0	Skallagrímur
Leiknir Reykjavík	3–2	Afturelding
Grótta	1–2	Reynir Sandgerði
11 June 1987
Vikverji	1–2	Grindavík

== Third round ==
Team 1	Score	Team 2
1 July 1987
þrottur Norðfjörður	2−1	Einherji
ÍR	3−2	Víkingur
Grindavík	2−0	Selfoss
Leiftur	0–0 (a.e.t.); 5−4 (pen)	KS
Leiknir Reykjavík	2–4	ÍBV
Reynir Sandgerði	3−2	Stjarnan

== Fourth round ==
- Entry of ten teams from the 1. Deild

Team 1	Score	Team 2
8 July 1987
ÍA	1−2	Keflavík
KA	0−0 (a.e.t.); 4−5 (pen)	Þór Akureyri
ÍBV	0−0 (a.e.t.); 4−5 (pen)	KR
Reynir Sandgerði	3−4	Leiftur
þrottur Norðfjörður	0−2 (a.e.t.)	Víðir
ÍR	0−6	Fram
9 July 1987
FH	1−2	Völsungur
Grindavík	1−2	Valur

== Quarter-finals ==
Team 1	Score	Team 2
22 July 1987
Þór Akureyri	0−0 (a.e.t.); 4−3 (pen)	Keflavík
Leiftur	1−3	Fram
Víðir	2−0	KR
Valur	0−0 (a.e.t.); 4−3 (pen)	Völsungur

== Semi-finals ==
Team 1	Score	Team 2
12 August 1987
Fram	3−1	Þór Akureyri
Víðir	1−0	Valur

== Final ==
30 August 1987

Fram	5–0	Víðir
Steinsson 17', 26'; Margeirsson 22' þorkelsson 49'; Orlygsson 52'	Report

Laugardalsvöllur, Reykjavík
Attendance: 3,784
Referee: Guðmunður Haraldsson
- Fram won their sixth Icelandic Cup, and qualified for the 1988–89 European Cup Winners' Cup.

== See also ==
- 1987 Úrvalsdeild
- Icelandic Men's Football Cup
