= 1993 Icelandic Cup =

Mjólkurbikarinn

Tournament details
- Country: Iceland

Final positions
- Champions: ÍA
- Runners-up: Keflavík

The 1993 Icelandic Cup was the 34th edition of the National Football Cup.

It took place between 25 May 1993 and 29 August 1993, with the final played at Laugardalsvöllur in Reykjavík. The cup was important, as winners qualified for the UEFA Cup Winners' Cup (if a club won both the league and the cup, the defeated finalists would take their place in the Cup Winners' Cup).

The 10 clubs from the 1. Deild entered in the last 16, with clubs from lower tiers entering in the three preliminary rounds. Teams played one-legged matches. In case of a draw, a penalty shoot-out took place (there were no replays, unlike in previous years).

ÍA, 1993 Icelandic Champions, won the double by beating Keflavík in the final to win their sixth Icelandic Cup, and qualify for Europe.

== First round ==
Team 1	Score	Team 2
25 May 1993
Einherji	2−0	Sindri
Selfoss	2−4	Stjarnan
Leiknir Reykjavík	1−3	Haukar
Fjölnir	2−1	Grindavík
Víkingur Ó.	0−2	Afturelding
Víðir	9−1	Ármann
Völsungur	4−0	þrymur
Skallagrímur	3−3 (a.e.t.); 2−4 (pen)	ÍR
Hvöt	4−2	Magni Grenivík
HB	1−6	þróttur
Reynir Sandgerði	1−3	Grótta
Hvatberar	4−5	Breiðablik
Dalvík	0−1	Tindastóll
Árvakur R.	1−7	BÍ
KBS	1−2	Austri E.
Snæfell	1−6	HK
Njarðvík	1−3	Ægir
1 June 1993
Höttur	4−0	Þróttur Neskaupstað

== Second round ==
Team 1	Score	Team 2
8 June 1993
ÍR	1–2	Stjarnan
BÍ	1–1 (a.e.t.); 4−5 (pen)	HK
Ægir	3–3 (a.e.t.); 1−2 (pen)	Grótta
Haukar	4–0	Fjölnir
Víðir	2–1	þróttur
Einherji	1–2	Höttur
Austri E.	4–2	Huginn
Leiftur	16–0	Austri Rh.
Völsungur	5–2	Tindastóll
Neisti H.	0–7	KA
KS	0–2	Hvöt
Breiðablik	2–0	Afturelding

== Third round ==
Team 1	Score	Team 2
22 June 1993
Hvöt	3–5	KA
Stjarnan	2–3	HK
Völsungur	0–2	Leiftur
Víðir	3–0	Haukar
Grótta	1–6	Breiðablik
Austri E.	0–7	Höttur

== Fourth round ==
- Entry of ten teams from the 1. Deild

Team 1	Score	Team 2
6 July 1993
Fram	0–1	KR
7 July 1993
Víðir	1–2	Víkingur
HK	0–3	ÍA
Fylkir	2–0	FH
Höttur	0–1	Leiftur
8 July 1993
Keflavík	1–0	þór Akureyri
ÍBV	4–0	KA
Valur	1–0	Breiðablik

== Quarter-finals ==
Team 1	Score	Team 2
19 July 1993
Keflavík	4–2	Leiftur
ÍA	4–1	Víkingur
Fylkir	1–2	Valur
KR	3–1	ÍBV

== Semi-finals ==
Team 1	Score	Team 2
4 August 1993
KR	0–1	ÍA
5 August 1993
Valur	1–2	Keflavík

== Final ==
29 August 1993

ÍA	2–1	Keflavík
Guðjonsson 14'; Biberčić 58'	Report	Tanasić 54'

Laugardalsvöllur, Reykjavík
Attendance: 5,717
Referee: Þorvarður Björnsson

ÍA won their sixth Icelandic Cup, and qualified for the 1994–95 European Cup Winners' Cup.

== See also ==
- 1993 Úrvalsdeild
- Icelandic Men's Football Cup
