= 1984 Icelandic Cup =

National football tournament in Iceland in 1984

Bikarkeppni karla

Tournament details
- Country: Iceland

Final positions
- Champions: ÍA
- Runners-up: Fram

The 1984 Icelandic Cup was the 25th edition of the National Football Cup.

It took place between 23 May 1984 and 26 August 1984, with the final played at Laugardalsvöllur in Reykjavík. The cup was important, as winners qualified for the UEFA Cup Winners' Cup (if a club won both the league and the cup, the defeated finalists would take their place in the Cup Winners' Cup).

The 10 clubs from the 1. Deild entered in the last 16, with clubs from lower tiers entering in the three preliminary rounds. Teams played one-legged matches. In case of a draw, a penalty shoot-out took place (there were no replays, unlike in previous years).

ÍA retained their title by beating Fram (promoted to the 1. Deild that season) in the final. It was their fourth Icelandic Cup victory, and meant that they won the League-Cup double for the second consecutive season. The victory meant that it was the losing finalists who qualified for Europe.

== First round ==
Team 1	Score	Team 2
23 May 1984
Víðir	1−0	Hafnir
Ármann	0−1	Grindavík
þrottur Norðfjörður	1−0	Leiknir F.
Hrafnkell Fr.	1−3	Austri Eskifjörður
Valur Reyðarfjörður	1−2	Einherji
Völsungur	2−1	Leiftur
Magni Grenivík	0−1	Tindastóll
FH	6−2	ÍR
Stokkseyri	1−4	Fylkir
Selfoss	3−1	Haukar
Huginn	2−0	Sindri
ÍBÍ	4−0	Vikverji
Vorboðinn	2−4	Vaskur
ÍBV	5−1	HV
Reynir Sandgerði	2−0	Njarðvík
24 May 1984
Léttir	0−3	Augnablik
Árvakur H.	0−1	Víkingur Ó.

== Second round ==
Team 1	Score	Team 2
5 June 1984
Skallagrímur	1–3	Stjarnan
ÍBÍ	4–0	Augnablik
Fylkir	4–0	Afturelding
ÍBV	5–0	IK
þrottur Norðfjörður	2–0	Huginn
Austri Eskifjörður	2–2 (a.e.t.); 4−3 (pen)	Einherji
KS	2–0	Vaskur
Völsungur	2–0	Tindastóll
Leiknir Reykjavík	1–9	Víkingur Ó.
FH	7–0	Snæfell
Selfoss	1–0	Reynir Sandgerði
Víðir	2–1	Grindavík

== Third round ==
Team 1	Score	Team 2
19 June 1984
Víðir	1−0	Selfoss
ÍBV	6−0	Stjarnan
Víkingur Ó.	2−1	FH
ÍBÍ	1−0	Fylkir
20 June 1984
KS	1–2	Völsungur
27 June 1984
þrottur Norðfjörður	0−3	Austri Eskifjörður

== Fourth round ==
- Entry of ten teams from the 1. Deild

Team 1	Score	Team 2
4 July 1984
Víkingur Ó.	1−2	Völsungur
Austri Eskifjörður	2−3	Þór Akureyri
Valur	3−3 (a.e.t.); 4−5 (pen)	KA
ÍBÍ	0−1	Fram
ÍBV	0−3	ÍA
Víðir	1−5	Breiðablik
KR	5−1	Keflavík
þróttur	3−1	Víkingur

== Quarter-finals ==
Team 1	Score	Team 2
17 July 1984
Breiðablik	0−0 (a.e.t.); 3−4 (pen)	ÍA
19 July 1984
KA	2−2 (a.e.t.); 5−6 (pen)	þróttur
KR	2−1	Þór Akureyri
Völsungur	0−7	Fram

== Semi-finals ==
Team 1	Score	Team 2
31 July 1984
ÍA	2−0	þróttur
Fram	3−1	KR

== Final ==
26 August 1984

ÍA	2–1 (a.e.t.)	Fram
Tryggvasson 88'; Sveinsson 91'	Report	Steinsson 53'

Laugardalsvöllur, Reykjavík
Attendance: 3,675
- ÍA won their fourth Icelandic Cup. As they also won the league, Fram qualified for the 1985–86 European Cup Winners' Cup.

== See also ==
- 1984 Úrvalsdeild
- Icelandic Men's Football Cup
