= 1983 Icelandic Cup =

24th edition of the National Football Cup

Bikarkeppni karla

Tournament details
- Country: Iceland

Final positions
- Champions: ÍA
- Runners-up: ÍBV

The 1983 Icelandic Cup was the 24th edition of the National Football Cup.

It took place between 23 May 1983 and 28 August 1983, with the final played at Laugardalsvöllur in Reykjavík. The cup was important, as winners qualified for the UEFA Cup Winners' Cup (if a club won both the league and the cup, the defeated finalists would take their place in the Cup Winners' Cup).

The 10 clubs from the 1. Deild entered in the last 16, with clubs from lower tiers entering in the three preliminary rounds. Teams played one-legged matches. In case of a draw, the match was replayed at the opposition's ground.

ÍA retained their title by beating ÍBV in the final. They won the first double since Valur in 1976 and meant that the losing finalists qualified for Europe.

== First round ==
| Team 1 | Score | Team 2 |
|---|---|---|
23 May 1983
| Austri Eskifjörður | 0–1 | Valur Reyðarfjörður |
| Ármann | 1–2 | HV |
| þrottur Norðfjörður | 3–1 | Huginn |
24 May 1983
| Fylkir | 2–0 | Selfoss |
| Bolungarvík | 2–5 | Stjarnan |
| Njarðvík | 0–2 | Fram |
| Reynir Sandgerði | 2–1 | Afturelding |
| Vikverji | 3–0 | Stokkseyri |
| Haukar | 1–2 | Árvakur H. |
| Víkingur Ó. | 2–3 | Víðir |
| IK | 2–0 | Hafnir |
26 May 1983
| FH | 1–0 | Augnablik |

== Second round ==
| Team 1 | Score | Team 2 |
|---|---|---|
8 June 1983
| Grindavík | 3–0 | Stjarnan |
| Árvakur H. | 2–3 | Vikverji |
| Völsungur | 2–0 | Vorboðinn |
| Tindastóll | 5–2 | Vaskur |
| Einherji | 5–1 | þrottur Norðfjörður |
| Sindri | 2–3 | Valur Reyðarfjörður |
| HSS | 0–4 | Leiftur |
| KS | 1–0 | KA |
| IK | 1–1 (a.e.t.); 5−4 (pen) | Skallagrímur |
| HV | 1–0 | Víðir |
| Fylkir | 2–1 | Reynir Sandgerði |
| Fram | 1–2 | FH |

== Third round ==
| Team 1 | Score | Team 2 |
|---|---|---|
22 June 1983
| HV | 0–0 (a.e.t.); 3−4 (pen) | Fylkir |
| Vikverji | 2–0 | IK |
| Grindavík | 2–3 | FH |
| Einherji | 5–2 | Valur Reyðarfjörður |
| Leiftur | 1–3 | Tindastóll |
| Völsungur | 2–3 | KS |

== Fourth round ==
- Entry of ten teams from the 1. Deild

| Team 1 | Score | Team 2 |
|---|---|---|
6 July 1983
| FH | 5–1 | þór Akureyri |
| Fylkir | 2–1 | KS |
| Valur | 0–0 (a.e.t.) | ÍA |
| Víkingur | 1–0 | ÍBÍ |
| Einherji | 0–1 | KR |
| Vikverji | 1–2 | Breiðablik |
| Tindastóll | 0–1 | Keflavík |
| ÍBV | 2–2 (a.e.t.) | þróttur |
Replay: 13 July 1983
| ÍA | 3–1 | Valur |
Replay: 14 July 1983
| þróttur | 0–3 | ÍBV |

== Quarter-finals ==
| Team 1 | Score | Team 2 |
|---|---|---|
20 July 1983
| Keflavík | 1–3 | ÍA |
| Breiðablik | 1–0 | Víkingur |
| KR | 0–1 | ÍBV |
| Fylkir | 0–0 (a.e.t.) | FH |
Replay: 25 July 1983
| FH | 1–0 | Fylkir |

== Semi-finals ==
| Team 1 | Score | Team 2 |
|---|---|---|
10 August 1983
| ÍA | 4–2 | Breiðablik |
11 August 1983
| FH | 2–2 (a.e.t.) | ÍBV |
Replay: 15 August 1983
| ÍBV | 4–1 | FH |

== Final ==
28 August 1983

| ÍA | 2–1 (a.e.t.) | ÍBV |
|---|---|---|
| Jóhannesson; Hakonarsson | Report | Sigþórsson |

Laugardalsvöllur, Reykjavík
- ÍA won their third Icelandic Cup. As they also won the league, ÍBV qualified for the 1984–85 European Cup Winners' Cup.

== See also ==
- 1983 Úrvalsdeild
- Icelandic Men's Football Cup
