= 1986 Icelandic Cup =

Icelandic national football cup

Mjólkurbikarinn

Tournament details
- Country: Iceland

Final positions
- Champions: ÍA
- Runners-up: Fram

The 1986 Icelandic Cup was the 27th edition of the National Football Cup.

It took place between 22 May 1984 and 31 August 1986, with the final played at Laugardalsvöllur in Reykjavík. The cup was important, as winners qualified for the UEFA Cup Winners' Cup (if a club won both the league and the cup, the defeated finalists would take their place in the Cup Winners' Cup).

The 10 clubs from the 1. Deild entered in the last 16, with clubs from lower tiers entering in the three preliminary rounds. Teams played one-legged matches. In case of a draw, a penalty shoot-out took place (there were no replays, unlike in previous years).

Fram failed to retain the trophy, losing to ÍA in the final. They won their fifth Icelandic Cup, and so qualified for Europe.

== First round ==
Team 1	Score	Team 2
27 May 1986
þrottur Norðfjörður	3−2	Huginn
Leiknir F.	0−3	Einherji
Höfðstrendingur	0−1	KS
Höttur	0−1	Austri Eskifjörður
þróttur	5−1	Leiknir Reykjavík
28 May 1986
Hamar	4−3	Selfoss
Valur Reyðarfjörður	2−1	Hrafnkell Fr.
Tindastóll	8−1	Magni Grenivík
Völsungur	0−1	KA
Vikverji	9−0	Skallagrímur
Leiftur	3−2	Vaskur
Afturelding	2−3	Grindavík
Fylkir	5−0	Hafnir
Grundarfjörður	2−3	HV
Njarðvík	1−2	Árvakur R.
Víkingur	13−1	Augnablik
Stjarnan	9–0	Léttir

== Second round ==
Team 1	Score	Team 2
10 June 1986
Vikverji	2–0	Skotfélag
Fylkir	9–0	HV
Víkingur	2−1	Stjarnan
Haukar	0−3	KS
11 June 1986
Valur Reyðarfjörður	1−0	Einherji
ÍR	2−1	þróttur
KS	2−2 (a.e.t.); 4−2 (pen)	Tindastóll
Grindavík	2−1	Víkingur Ó.
Árvakur R.	1−2	Hamar
Reynir Sandgerði	4−2	Ármann
Austri Eskifjörður	4−0	þrottur Norðfjörður
KA	0−1	Leiftur

== Third round ==
Team 1	Score	Team 2
1 July 1986
Vikverji	1−4	Hamar
Grindavík	2−0	ÍR
Austri Eskifjörður	4−1	Valur Reyðarfjörður
2 July 1986
Leiftur	0–0 (a.e.t.); 4−5 (pen)	KS
Reynir Sandgerði	0–4	Víkingur
Fylkir	2−1	IK

== Fourth round ==
- Entry of ten teams from the 1. Deild

Team 1	Score	Team 2
9 July 1986
Hamar	0−5	ÍA
KR	3−0	Þór Akureyri
Víðir	0−1	Keflavík
Austri Eskifjörður	1−2	FH
ÍBV	0−2	Breiðablik
Fylkir	0−1	Fram
KS	1−2	Víkingur
Grindavík	2−6	Valur

== Quarter-finals ==
Team 1	Score	Team 2
23 July 1986
FH	0−1	Keflavík
KR	2−6	Fram
Víkingur	0−3	Valur
Breiðablik	2−2 (a.e.t.); 4−5 (pen)	ÍA

== Semi-finals ==
Team 1	Score	Team 2
13 August 1986
Fram	2−0	Keflavík
ÍA	3−1	Valur

== Final ==
31 August 1986

ÍA	2–1	Fram
Pétursson 75', 90'	Report	Ormslev 50'

Laugardalsvöllur, Reykjavík
Attendance: 4,486
Referee: Eysteinn Gudmundsson
- Fram won their fifth Icelandic Cup, and qualified for the 1987–88 European Cup Winners' Cup.

== See also ==
- 1986 Úrvalsdeild
- Icelandic Men's Football Cup
