= 1988 Icelandic Cup =

Mjólkurbikarinn

Tournament details
- Country: Iceland

Final positions
- Champions: Valur
- Runners-up: Keflavík

The 1988 Icelandic Cup was the 29th edition of the National Football Cup.

It took place between 31 May 1988 and 27 August 1988, with the final played at Laugardalsvöllur in Reykjavík. The cup was important, as winners qualified for the UEFA Cup Winners' Cup (if a club won both the league and the cup, the defeated finalists would take their place in the Cup Winners' Cup).

The 10 clubs from the 1. Deild entered in the last 16, with clubs from lower tiers entering in the three preliminary rounds. Teams played one-legged matches. In case of a draw, a penalty shoot-out took place (there were no replays, unlike in previous years).

Valur won their fifth Icelandic Cup, beating Keflavík in the final, and so qualifying for Europe.

== First round ==
Team 1	Score	Team 2
31 May 1988
Hamar	4–3	Grótta
Hvöt	1–3	Magni Grenivík
Víðir	4–0	Ármann
Selfoss	7–1	Haukar
Einherji	4–2	Huginn
Grindavík	2–0	Breiðablik
Reynir Sandgerði	4–2	IK
Sindri	3–0	Austri Eskifjörður
Afturelding	0–0 (a.e.t.); 3−5 (pen)	ÍBV
1 June 1988
Njarðvík	3–2	Vikverji
Tindastóll	5–0	Dalvík
Ernir	0–6	ÍR
Valur Reyðarfjörður	2–1	Höttur
Hvatberar	0–5	Þróttur
Léttir	0–3	Hafnir
Ægir	2–1	Fyrirtak
þrottur Norðfjörður	2–0	KSH
ÍBÍ	2–0	Stjarnan
Árvakur H.	2–1	Skotfélag
Augnablik	2–0	Víkingur Ó.
Leiknir Reykjavík	1–1 (a.e.t.); 2−4 (pen)	FH
Fylkir	6–2	Snæfell

== Second round ==
Team 1	Score	Team 2
12 June 1988
Árvakur H.	2–0	Hafnir
Augnablik	3–8	ÍBV
13 June 1988
FH	4–0	ÍR
Selfoss	2–1	Víðir
ÍBÍ	3–1	Hamar
Grindavík	11–0	Ægir
Valur Reyðarfjörður	0–1	þrottur Norðfjörður
Sindri	0–3	Einherji
Tindastóll	4–2	KS
Þróttur	3–1	Njarðvík
16 June 1988
Reynir Sandgerði	2–1	Fylkir
Magni Grenivík	3–0	Eyjafjarðar

== Third round ==
Team 1	Score	Team 2
29 June 1988
þrottur Norðfjörður	2–5	Einherji
Selfoss	6–1	Árvakur H.
FH	2–1 (a.e.t.)	Grindavík
Tindastóll	2–1 (a.e.t.)	Magni Grenivík
ÍBV	4–1	ÍBÍ
Reynir Sandgerði	2–2 (a.e.t.); 3−2 (pen)	Þróttur

== Fourth round ==
- Entry of ten teams from the 1. Deild

Team 1	Score	Team 2
5 July 1988
Keflavík	0–0 (a.e.t.); 2−1 (pen)	Selfoss
Einherji	0–6	Valur
Tindastóll	4–3	KR
Reynir Sandgerði	0–5	FH
ÍBV	1–2	Fram
Völsungur	1–3	Leiftur
ÍA	1–0	KA
Þór Akureyri	1–2	Víkingur

== Quarter-finals ==
Team 1	Score	Team 2
20 July 1988
Leiftur	3–0	Tindastóll
FH	0–2	Víkingur
ÍA	0–1	Keflavík
Valur	3–1 (a.e.t.)	Fram

== Semi-finals ==
Team 1	Score	Team 2
10 August 1988
Leiftur	0–1	Keflavík
Víkingur	0–1	Valur

== Final ==
27 August 1988

Valur	1–0	Keflavík
Baldursson 67'	Report

Laugardalsvöllur, Reykjavík
Attendance: 2,432
Referee: Baldur Scheving
- Valur won their fifth Icelandic Cup, and qualified for the 1989–90 European Cup Winners' Cup.

== See also ==
- 1988 Úrvalsdeild
- Icelandic Men's Football Cup
