= 1976 Icelandic Cup =

Bikarkeppni karla

Tournament details
- Country: Iceland

Final positions
- Champions: Valur
- Runners-up: ÍA

The 1976 Icelandic Cup was the 17th edition of the National Football Cup.

It took place between 2 June 1976 and 12 September 1976, with the final played at Laugardalsvöllur in Reykjavík. The cup was important, as winners qualified for the UEFA Cup Winners' Cup (if a club won both the league and the cup, the defeated finalists would take their place in the Cup Winners' Cup).

The 9 clubs from the 1. Deild entered in the last 16, with clubs from lower tiers entering in the three preliminary rounds. Teams played one-legged matches. In case of a draw, the match was replayed at the opposition's ground.

Valur won their third Icelandic Cup, beating ÍA in the final. As the cup winners also won the league, the losing finalists qualified for Europe.

== First round ==
Team 1	Score	Team 2
2 June 1976
Hamar	0–12	Haukar
4 June 1976
Fylkir	3–0	Grótta
9 June 1976
Grindavík	2–6	Víðir
Austri Eskifjörður	2–1	KSH
11 June 1976
þrottur Norðfjörður	7–0	Valur Reyðarfjörður
12 June 1976
Leiknir F.	5–1	Einherji
23 June 1976
UMS Skagafjördur	11–0	USV Húnvetninga
Leiftur Ólafsfjörður	3–2	USA Húnvetninga
Magni Grenivík	7–1	Eilifur
Njarðvík	2–4	Afturelding

== Second round ==
Team 1	Score	Team 2
23 June 1976
Víkingur Ó.	4–0	Snæfell
ÍBÍ	6–0	Grettir
29 June 1976
Ármann Reykjavík	1–0	Leiknir Reykjavík
30 June 1976
Afturelding	2–4	Fylkir
Völsungur	3–0	UMS Skagafjördur
Þór Þorlákshöfn	1–3	Selfoss
þrottur Norðfjörður	3–0	Leiknir F.
Huginn	2–1	Austri Eskifjörður
KA	12–0	Leiftur Reykjavík
Reynir Árskógsströnd	0–1	Magni Grenivík
KS	4–2	þór Akureyri
Reynir Sandgerði	0–1	Víðir
ÍR	0–3	Haukar
ÍBV	4–0	Stjarnan

== Third round ==
Team 1	Score	Team 2
7 July 1976
Selfoss	2–4	ÍBV
ÍBÍ	3–2	Víkingur Ó.
14 July 1976
Huginn	1–2	þrottur Norðfjörður
Haukar	4–0	Fylkir
Víðir	1–0	Ármann Reykjavík
KS	2–3	Völsungur
Magni Grenivík	0–2	KA

== Fourth round ==
- Entry of nine teams from the 1. Deild

Team 1	Score	Team 2
27 July 1976
KA	2–6	KR
Haukar	1–4	Valur
þróttur	0–2	FH
ÍA	3–0	Víkingur
Keflavík	4–0	ÍBV
Völsungur	2–3	Breiðablik
28 July 1976
ÍBÍ	1–3	Fram
29 July 1976
þrottur Norðfjörður	4–2	Víðir

== Quarter-finals ==
Team 1	Score	Team 2
11 August 1976
FH	2–2	þrottur Norðfjörður
ÍA	3–1	Keflavík
Fram	1–2	Valur
26 August 1976
KR	1–3^{1}	Breiðablik

^{1} The match was replayed after a 1–1 draw.

== Semi-finals ==
Team 1	Score	Team 2
26 August 1976
FH	2–3	ÍA
2 September 1976
Breiðablik	0–3^{1}	Valur

^{1} The match was replayed after a 0–0 draw.

== Final ==
12 September 1976

Valur	3–0	ÍA
Gunnarsson, Björnsson	Report

Laugardalsvöllur, Reykjavík
- Valur won their third Icelandic Cup. As they also won the league, ÍA qualified for the 1977–78 European Cup Winners' Cup.

== See also ==
- 1976 Úrvalsdeild
- Icelandic Men's Football Cup
