= 1985 Icelandic Cup =

Bikarkeppni karla

Tournament details
- Country: Iceland

Final positions
- Champions: Fram
- Runners-up: Keflavík

The 1985 Icelandic Cup was the 26th edition of the National Football Cup.

It took place between 22 May 1984 and 25 August 1984, with the final played at Laugardalsvöllur in Reykjavík. The cup was important, as winners qualified for the UEFA Cup Winners' Cup (if a club won both the league and the cup, the defeated finalists would take their place in the Cup Winners' Cup).

The 10 clubs from the 1. Deild entered in the last 16, with clubs from lower tiers entering in the three preliminary rounds. Teams played one-legged matches. In case of a draw, a penalty shoot-out took place (there were no replays, unlike in previous years).

Fram won the trophy, beating Keflavík in the final. They won their fifth Icelandic Cup, and so qualified for Europe.

== First round ==
Team 1	Score	Team 2
22 May 1985
Leiftur	1−0	Völsungur
Magni Grenivík	0−1	KA
Leiknir Reykjavík	1−2	Víkingur Ó.
Tindastóll	2−1	Vaskur
Reynir Sandgerði	2−1	Hafnir
þrottur Norðfjörður	3−0	Höttur
Skallagrímur	7−0	Haukar
Valur Reyðarfjörður	2−3	Huginn
Hrafnkell	1−3	Austri Eskifjörður
HV	0−0 (a.e.t.); 2−3 (pen)	Stjarnan
IK	3−2	Vikverji
Afturelding	2−5	Léttir
ÍBÍ	4−2	Fylkir
Einherji	3−2	Leiknir F.
Njarðvík	2−1	Selfoss
22 May 1985
Ármann	1−8	ÍR

== Second round ==
Team 1	Score	Team 2
5 June 1985
Stjarnan	0−0 (a.e.t.); 5−6 (pen)	Njarðvík
ÍBV	3−0	ÍBÍ
Víkingur Ó.	3−3 (a.e.t.); 5−4 (pen)	Augnablik
Leiftur	0−1	KS
Reynir Sandgerði	5−1	Léttir
Tindastóll	0−3	KA
ÍR	2–1	Skallagrímur
Huginn	0−0 (a.e.t.); 3−4 (pen)	Austri Eskifjörður
Breiðablik	0−1	Grindavík
Árvakur R.	13−1	Tálknafjörður
IK	0−0 (a.e.t.); 4−5 (pen)	Grótta
þrottur Norðfjörður	0−0 (a.e.t.); 3−4 (pen)	Einherji

== Third round ==
Team 1	Score	Team 2
19 June 1985
Austri Eskifjörður	0−1	Einherji
Reynir Sandgerði	4−1	ÍR
Víkingur Ó.	0−2	Njarðvík
Grindavík	2−3	Árvakur R.
KS	1−2	KA
ÍBV	8−0	Grótta

== Fourth round ==
- Entry of ten teams from the 1. Deild

Team 1	Score	Team 2
2 July 1985
Reynir Sandgerði	3−5	Þór Akureyri
KR	3−5 (a.e.t.)	ÍA
Árvakur R.	1−1 (a.e.t.); 1−4 (pen)	Víðir
3 July 1985
ÍBV	2−4	FH
Víkingur	3−4 (a.e.t.)	Fram
KA	4−2	Einherji
4 July 1985
þróttur	2−4	Valur
Njarðvík	0−3	Keflavík

== Quarter-finals ==
Team 1	Score	Team 2
17 July 1985
KA	2−1	Víðir
Þór Akureyri	3−2	FH
Keflavík	3−1	Valur
ÍA	1−2	Fram

== Semi-finals ==
Team 1	Score	Team 2
29 July 1985
Fram	3−0 (a.e.t.)	Þór Akureyri
13 August 1985
Keflavík	2−0	KA

== Final ==
25 August 1985

Fram	3–1	Keflavík
Ormslev 29', 63'; Torfason 69'	Report	Margeirsson 68'

Laugardalsvöllur, Reykjavík
Attendance: 5,330
- Fram won their fifth Icelandic Cup, and qualified for the 1986–87 European Cup Winners' Cup.

== See also ==
- 1985 Úrvalsdeild
- Icelandic Men's Football Cup
