= 1977 Icelandic Cup =

Bikarkeppni karla

Tournament details
- Country: Iceland

Final positions
- Champions: Valur
- Runners-up: Fram

The 1977 Icelandic Cup was the 18th edition of the National Football Cup.

It took place between 31 May 1977 and 11 September 1977, with the final played at Laugardalsvöllur in Reykjavík. The cup was important, as winners qualified for the UEFA Cup Winners' Cup (if a club won both the league and the cup, the defeated finalists would take their place in the Cup Winners' Cup).

The 10 clubs from the 1. Deild entered in the last 16, with clubs from lower tiers entering in the three preliminary rounds. Teams played one-legged matches. In case of a draw, the match was replayed at the opposition's ground.

Valur won their fourth Icelandic Cup, beating Fram in the final. The club therefore qualified for Europe.

== First round ==
Team 1	Score	Team 2
31 May 1977
Stjarnan	3–1	Þór Þorlákshöfn
Njarðvík	1–3	Víðir
Selfoss	5–0	Grótta
Leiknir Reykjavík	2–4	Ármann Reykjavík
4 June 1977
Víkingur Ó.	4–1	Snæfell
7 June 1977
Leiftur	1–4	Arroðinn A.
þrottur Norðfjörður	4–1	Austri Eskifjörður
13 June 1977
Einherji	8–1	Huginn

== Second round ==
Team 1	Score	Team 2
14 June 1977
Hvöt	0–1	Tindastóll
KS	1–2	Reynir Árskógsströnd
Ármann Reykjavík	2–1	Grindavík
Völsungur	6–0	Magni Grenivík
Arroðinn A.	0–1	KA
Bolungarvík	0–5	ÍBÍ
Víðir	4–1	IK
Fylkir	5–1	Stjarnan
Haukar	2–4	þróttur
Hrafnkell	1–2	þrottur Norðfjörður
Selfoss	3–0	Víkingur Ó.
29 June 1977
Leiknir F.	2–5	Einherji

== Third round ==
Team 1	Score	Team 2
28 June 1977
þróttur	4–0	Víðir
ÍBÍ	4–5	Selfoss
Ármann Reykjavík	4–0	Fylkir
KA	3–1	Tindastóll
Reynir Árskógsströnd	4–3	Völsungur
6 July 1977
þrottur Norðfjörður	3–1	Einherji

== Fourth round ==
- Entry of ten teams from the 1. Deild

Team 1	Score	Team 2
12 July 1977
Valur	6–1	þór Akureyri
13 July 1977
ÍA	1–0	Breiðablik
Ármann Reykjavík	0–5	FH
Keflavík	3–0	KA
14 July 1977
þróttur	2–3	Fram
KR	6–0	Selfoss
19 July 1977
Víkingur	2–1	þrottur Norðfjörður
26 July 1977
Reynir Árskógsströnd	1–7	ÍBV

== Quarter-finals ==
Team 1	Score	Team 2
27 July 1977
FH	3–2	ÍA
28 July 1977
Valur	2–1	Víkingur
29 July 1977
Fram	2–0	KR
ÍBV	3–2	Keflavík

== Semi-finals ==
Team 1	Score	Team 2
9 August 1977
FH	0–3	Fram
10 August 1977
Valur	4–0	ÍBV

== Final ==
11 September 1977

Valur	2–1	Fram
A. Eðvaldsson; Albertsson	Report	Sigsteinsson

Laugardalsvöllur, Reykjavík
- Valur won their fourth Icelandic Cup and qualified for the 1978–79 European Cup Winners' Cup.

== See also ==
- 1977 Úrvalsdeild
- Icelandic Men's Football Cup
