= 1979 Icelandic Cup =

Bikarkeppni karla

Tournament details
- Country: Iceland

Final positions
- Champions: Fram
- Runners-up: Valur

The 1979 Icelandic Cup was the 20th edition of the National Football Cup.

It took place between 30 May 1979 and 26 August 1979, with the final played at Laugardalsvöllur in Reykjavík. The cup was important, as winners qualified for the UEFA Cup Winners' Cup (if a club won both the league and the cup, the defeated finalists would take their place in the Cup Winners' Cup).

The 10 clubs from the 1. Deild entered in the last 16, with clubs from lower tiers entering in the three preliminary rounds. Teams played one-legged matches. In case of a draw, the match was replayed at the opposition's ground.

Fram Reykjavík won their third Icelandic Cup, beating Valur Reykjavík in the final. The club therefore qualified for Europe.

== First round ==
Team 1	Score	Team 2
30 May 1979
Víkingur Ó.	1–4	Grótta
Fylkir	2–0	Óðinn
Súlan	2–1	Sindri
Bolungarvík	9–12	ÍBÍ
Leiknir F.	1–5	þrottur Norðfjörður
Hrafnkell	0–2	Austri Eskifjörður
Reynir Sandgerði	0–1	Stjarnan
Tindastóll	4–1	Völsungur
Huginn	5–6	Einherji
Selfoss	3–0	Afturelding
Þór Þorlákshöfn	0–3	Ármann Reykjavík
IK	2–4	Grindavík
Víðir	7–6	FH
6 June 1979
Leiftur	1–2	Magni Grenivík

== Second round ==
Team 1	Score	Team 2
13 June 1979
þór Akureyri	4–2	HSÞ-b
UMF Skallagrímur	0–3	ÍBÍ
Magni Grenivík	6–7	Svarfdælir
Leiknir Reykjavík	1–0	Selfoss
Súlan	0–2	þrottur Norðfjörður
KS	2–1	Arroðinn A.
Reynir Árskógsströnd	0–5	Tindastóll
Ármann Reykjavík	3–1	Víðir
Fylkir	2–1	Grindavík
Breiðablik	3–1	Stjarnan
Hekla	1–7	Grótta
20 June 1979
Einherji	1–3	Austri Eskifjörður

== Third round ==
Team 1	Score	Team 2
20 June 1979
Svarfdælir	1–3	þór Akureyri
þrottur Norðfjörður	1–0	Austri Eskifjörður
Ármann Reykjavík	1–3	Fylkir
ÍBÍ	2–0	Grótta
KS	5–3	Tindastóll
Breiðablik	8–0	Leiknir Reykjavík

== Fourth round ==
- Entry of ten teams from the 1. Deild

Team 1	Score	Team 2
3 July 1979
þór Akureyri	0–4	ÍBV
Víkingur	0–1	Valur
Haukar	0–3	þróttur
4 July 1979
ÍA	7–0	þrottur Norðfjörður
Breiðablik	4–0	Fylkir
Keflavík	2–0	ÍBÍ
KA	2–3	Fram
KR	3–1	KS

== Quarter-finals ==
Team 1	Score	Team 2
18 July 1979
ÍBV	1–2	þróttur
ÍA	1–0	Keflavík
Fram	3–1	Breiðablik
19 July 1979
KR	0–2	Valur

== Semi-finals ==
Team 1	Score	Team 2
7 August 1979
Fram	2–0^{1}	þróttur
8 August 1979
Valur	2–1	ÍA

^{1} The match was replayed after a 2–2 draw.

== Final ==
26 August 1979

Fram	1–0	Valur
Geirsson	Report

Laugardalsvöllur, Reykjavík
- Fram won their third Icelandic Cup and qualified for the 1980–81 European Cup Winners' Cup.

== See also ==
- 1979 Úrvalsdeild
- Icelandic Men's Football Cup
