= 1980 Icelandic Cup =

Bikarkeppni karla

Tournament details
- Country: Iceland

Final positions
- Champions: Fram
- Runners-up: ÍBV

The 1980 Icelandic Cup was the 21st edition of the National Football Cup.

It took place between 28 May 1980 and 31 August 1980, with the final played at Laugardalsvöllur in Reykjavík. The cup was important, as winners qualified for the UEFA Cup Winners' Cup (if a club won both the league and the cup, the defeated finalists would take their place in the Cup Winners' Cup).

The 10 clubs from the 1. Deild entered in the last 16, with clubs from lower tiers entering in the three preliminary rounds. Teams played one-legged matches. In case of a draw, the match was replayed at the opposition's ground.

Fram retained their title, winning their fourth Icelandic Cup by beating ÍBV in the final. The club therefore qualified for Europe.

== First round ==
Team 1	Score	Team 2
28 May 1980
Skallagrímur	2–7	ÍBÍ
Leiftur Reykjavík	w/o	HSÞ-b
Huginn	2–1	Sindri
þrottur Norðfjörður	3–0	Súlan
Hrafnkell	1–6	Leiknir F.
Austri Eskifjörður	0–1	Einherji
Völsungur	6–5	Magni Grenivík
Arroðinn A.	1–2	Dagsbrún
Njarðvík	0–1	Reynir Sandgerði
Oðinn	1–0	Grindavík
Víðir	2–0	Leiknir Reykjavík
Bolungarvík	2–7	Ármann Reykjavík

== Second round ==
Team 1	Score	Team 2
11 June 1980
Leiknir F.	0–2	Huginn
Tindastóll	7–3	Dagsbrún
KS	2–1	HSÞ-b
þrottur Norðfjörður	1–0	Einherji
Völsungur	8–9	þór Akureyri
Efling	0–9	KA
13 June 1980
Ármann Reykjavík	1–2	Afturelding
Fylkir	2–1	Reynir Sandgerði
Oðinn	1–3	ÍBÍ
Víðir	2–1	Stjarnan
Hamar	2–3	Grótta
Haukar	1–3	Víkingur Ó.

== Third round ==
Team 1	Score	Team 2
18 June 1980
KS	3–1	Tindastóll
ÍBÍ	0–2	Grótta
Fylkir	1–0	Afturelding
Huginn	0–3	þrottur Norðfjörður
þór Akureyri	2–3	KA
Víðir	1–2	Víkingur Ó.

== Fourth round ==
- Entry of ten teams from the 1. Deild

Team 1	Score	Team 2
2 July 1980
Grótta	0–4	Keflavík
Víkingur Ó.	0–2	þrottur Norðfjörður
Fram	3–2	Valur
ÍA	1–3	FH
ÍBV	2–1	KR
8 July 1980
Fylkir	0–2	KS
10 July 1980
KA	0–3	Víkingur
þróttur	1–2	Breiðablik

== Quarter-finals ==
Team 1	Score	Team 2
23 July 1980
Víkingur	1–2	Fram
FH	1–0	þrottur Norðfjörður
Keflavík	2–3	ÍBV
KS	0–2	Breiðablik

== Semi-finals ==
Team 1	Score	Team 2
13 August 1980
Breiðablik	2–3	ÍBV
FH	0–1	Fram

== Final ==
31 August 1980

Fram	2–1	ÍBV
Steinsson; Þorfason	Report	Johannsson

Laugardalsvöllur, Reykjavík
- Fram won their fourth Icelandic Cup and qualified for the 1981–82 European Cup Winners' Cup.

== See also ==
- 1980 Úrvalsdeild
- Icelandic Men's Football Cup
