= 1998 Icelandic Cup =

Coca-Cola bikar

Tournament details
- Country: Iceland

Final positions
- Champions: ÍBV
- Runners-up: Leiftur

The 1998 Coca-Cola bikar was the 39th season of the Icelandic national football cup. It started on 24 May 1998 and concluded with the final on 30 August 1998. The winners qualified for the qualifying round of the 1999–2000 UEFA Cup.

== First round ==
| Team 1 | Score | Team 2 |
|---|---|---|
24 May 1998
| Neisti H. | 0–2 | Nökkvi |
| Hvöt | 0–2 | KS |
| Höttur | 5–2 | Einherji |
| Sindri | 0–1 | Leiknir F. |
25 May 1998
| Huginn | 1–7 | Þróttur Neskaupstað |
| Fylkir U23 | 5–0 | Ármann |
| Ægir | 6–1 | GG |
| Tindastóll | 1–0 | Magni Grenivík |
| Bruni | 1–2 | Haukar |
| KFS | 0–1 | Reynir Sandgerði |
| Þróttur Vogum | 0–9 | KR U23 |
| Afturelding | 5–0 | Keflavík U23 |

== Second round ==
| Team 1 | Score | Team 2 |
|---|---|---|
3 June 1998
| Bolungarvík | 2–0 | Ernir |
4 June 1998
| Ægir | 3–5 | Víkingur |
| Haukar | 3–2 | Njarðvík |
| Snæfell | 0–15 | KR U23 |
| ÍA U23 | 2–1 | Fylkir U23 |
| Selfoss | 4–3 | Fram U23 |
| Þróttur Neskaupstað | 0–3 | KVA |
| Völsungur | 1–2 | KA |
| KS | 1–2 | Tindastóll |
| FH U23 | 1–3 | Stjarnan U23 |
| Grindavík U23 | 1–3 | Víðir |
| Valur U23 | 4–3 | Reynir Sandgerði |
| Leiknir Reykjavík | 3–1 | HK |
5 June 1998
| Höttur | 0–3 | Leiknir F. |
| Dalvík | 2–1 | Nökkvi |
| Víkingur Ó. | 0–4 | Afturelding |

== Third round ==
| Team 1 | Score | Team 2 |
|---|---|---|
18 June 1998
| Bolungarvík | 0−4 | Valur |
| KR U23 | 3−1 | ÍA |
| Tindastóll | 0−5 | Leiftur |
| Dalvík | 0−5 | Grindavík |
| Selfoss | 0−5 | ÍR |
| Víkingur | 5−0 | Stjarnan |
| Leiknir F. | 1−3 | FH |
| Haukar | 1−5 | Fram |
| Afturelding | 0−1 | ÍBV |
19 June 1998
| KVA | 1−0 | Keflavík |
| ÍA U23 | 1−2 | Fylkir |
| Leiknir Reykjavík | 1−2 | þór Akureyri |
| KA | 1−3 | KR |
| Víðir | 3−1 | Skallagrímur |
| Stjarnan U23 | 0−4 | Breiðablik |
| Valur U23 | 0−2 | Þróttur |

== Fourth round ==
| Team 1 | Score | Team 2 |
|---|---|---|
1 July 1998
| Víðir | 2−2 (a.e.t.); 1−3 (pen) | Víkingur |
| KVA | 2−4 | Leiftur |
| KR | 4−1 | Valur |
| þór Akureyri | 1−2 | ÍBV |
| Breiðablik | 3−0 | ÍR |
2 July 1998
| Fram | 2−5 | Þróttur |
| Fylkir | 3−1 | FH |
| Grindavík | 2−0 | KR U23 |

== Quarter-finals ==
| Team 1 | Score | Team 2 |
|---|---|---|
14 July 1998
| Grindavík | 2–0 | Þróttur |
| Leiftur | 2–1 | Víkingur |
| ÍBV | 1–0 (a.e.t.) | KR |
15 July 1998
| Fylkir | 1–3 | Breiðablik |

== Semi-finals ==
| Team 1 | Score | Team 2 |
|---|---|---|
5 August 1998
| ÍBV | 2–0 | Breiðablik |
6 August 1998
| Grindavík | 0–2 | Leiftur |

== Final ==
30 August 1998

| ÍBV | 2–0 | Leiftur |
|---|---|---|
| S. Jóhannesson 36'; H. Jóhannesson 69' |

Laugardalsvollur, Reykjavík
Attendance: 4,648
Referee: Kristinn Jakobsson
