= 1994 Icelandic Cup =

Mjólkurbikarinn

Tournament details
- Country: Iceland

Final positions
- Champions: KR
- Runners-up: Grindavík

The 1994 Mjólkurbikarinn was the 35th season of the Icelandic national football cup. It started on 31 May 1994 and concluded with the final on 28 August 1994. The winners qualified for the qualifying round of the 1995–96 UEFA Cup Winners' Cup.

== First round ==
| Team 1 | Score | Team 2 |
|---|---|---|
31 May 1994
| Grótta | 2–4 | Fjölnir |
| Framherjar | 0–4 | Víðir |
1 June 1994
| Víkingur Ó. | 0–2 | HK |
| Ökkli | 2–3 | BÍ |
| Smástund | 3–2 | Selfoss |

== Second round ==
| Team 1 | Score | Team 2 |
|---|---|---|
15 June 1994
| Huginn | 0–5 | Höttur |
| Dalvík | 2–4 | Völsungur |
| Hvöt | 2–2 (a.e.t.); 4−3 (pen) | Magni Grenivík |
| KS | 11–0 | þrymur |
| Neisti H. | 0–2 | Tindastóll |
| GG | 1–2 | Leiknir Reykjavík |
| Neisti D. | 6–2 | Sindri |
| Haukar | 0–0 (a.e.t.); 2−4 (pen) | Hamar |
| BÍ | 5–1 | Ármann |
| Reynir Sandgerði | 1–1 (a.e.t.); 9–8 (pen) | Ægir |
| Einherji | 5–4 | KBS |
| Þróttur Neskaupstað | 6–0 | KVA |
| ÍR | 0–1 | Afturelding |
| Smástund | 1–1 (a.e.t.); 4−2 (pen) | Njarðvík |
| HK | 1–2 | Víðir |
16 June 1994
| Fjölnir | 1–4 | Skallagrímur |

== Third round ==
| Team 1 | Score | Team 2 |
|---|---|---|
28 June 1994
| Smástund | 2–3 | Víkingur |
| Skallagrímur | 2−2 (a.e.t.); 4−5 (pen) | Leiftur |
| Völsungur | 0−4 | Grindavík |
29 June 1994
| Hamar | 0−5 | Breiðablik |
| Þróttur Neskaupstað | 2−5 | Fylkir |
| Víðir | 1−3 | Fram |
| KS | 2−4 | ÍBV |
| Hvöt | 0−2 | KA |
| Tindastóll | 0−3 | þróttur |
| Leiknir Reykjavík | 1−3 | ÍA |
30 June 1994
| BÍ | 1−5 | Stjarnan |
| Afturelding | 1−4 | FH |
| Reynir Sandgerði | 0−1 | þór Akureyri |
| Einherji | 0−5 | KR |
| Neisti D. | 0−12 | Valur |
| Höttur | 0−2 | Keflavík |

== Fourth round ==
| Team 1 | Score | Team 2 |
|---|---|---|
14 July 1994
| Þróttur | 3–4 | ÍBV |
| Víkingur | 4–6 | þór Akureyri |
| Breiðablik | 0–0 (a.e.t.); 4−3 (pen) | Keflavík |
| Leiftur | 0–2 | Fylkir |
15 July 1994
| Valur | 2–5 | Fram |
| Grindavík | 2–2 (a.e.t.); 5−4 (pen) | FH |
| KA | 2–3 | Stjarnan |
| ÍA | 0–1 | KR |

== Quarter-finals ==
| Team 1 | Score | Team 2 |
|---|---|---|
24 July 1994
| þór Akureyri | 4–1 | Fram |
25 July 1994
| Fylkir | 1–3 | Stjarnan |
| Breiðablik | 1–2 | KR |
| Grindavík | 0–0 (a.e.t.); 6−5 (pen) | ÍBV |

== Semi-finals ==
| Team 1 | Score | Team 2 |
|---|---|---|
17 August 1994
| KR | 3–0 | þór Akureyri |
| Stjarnan | 3–3 (a.e.t.); 3−4 (pen) | Grindavík |

== Final ==
28 August 1994

| KR | 2–0 | Grindavík |
|---|---|---|
| Kristinsson 54'; Daníelsson 73' |

Laugardalsvollur, Reykjavík
Referee: Eyjólfur Ólafsson
