= 1970 Icelandic Cup =

Bikarkeppni karla

Tournament details
- Country: Iceland

Final positions
- Champions: Fram
- Runners-up: ÍBV

The 1970 Icelandic Cup was the 11th edition of the National Football Cup.

It took place between 2 July 1969 and 14 November 1969, with the final played at Melavöllur in Reykjavík. The cup was important, as winners qualified for the UEFA Cup Winners' Cup (if a club won both the league and the cup, the defeated finalists would take their place in the Cup Winners' Cup).

The top three finishers from the previous season (ÍA Akranes, ÍBK Keflavík and KR Reykjavík did not enter until the quarter finals, the other teams from the 1. Deild (first division) entered in the fourth round. In prior rounds, teams from the 2. Deild (2nd division), as well as reserve teams, played in one-legged matches. In case of a draw, the match was replayed. For the first time, reserve teams did not enter from this season.

Fram Reykjavík won their first Icelandic Cup, beating ÍBV Vestmannaeyjar in the final, and so qualifying for Europe.

== First round ==
Team 1	Team 2	Result
Leiknir Fáskrúðsfjörður	Valur Reyðarfirði	4 - 2
Hrafnkell Freysgoði	Austri	3 - 0

== Second round ==
Team 1	Team 2	Result
Leiknir Fáskrúðsfjörður	Hrafnkell Freysgoði	1 - 0
FH Hafnarfjörður	UMF Njarðvík	forfeit
KS Siglufjörður	Leiftur Ólafsfjörður	5 - 1
Völsungur Húsavík	Tindastóll Sauðárkrókur	11 - 3
Víðir Garður	Reynir Sandgerði	forfeit
Hamar Hveragerði	Freyr	forfeit
Þróttur Reykjavík	Hrönn	forfeit
Breiðablik	Stjarnan	11 - 0

== Third round ==
Team 1	Team 2	Result
Þróttur Norðfjörður	Leiknir Fáskrúðsfjörður	3 - 0
Hamar Hveragerði	UMF Selfoss	1 - 10
Víðir Garður	Breiðablik	1 - 4
Haukar Hafnarfjörður	FH	3 - 2
Þróttur Reykjavík	Glímufélagið Ármann	2 - 6
KS Siglufjörður	Völsungur Húsavík	4 - 1

== Fourth round ==
Team 1	Team 2	Result
Breiðablik	Selfoss	3 - 1 (replayed after 1–1 draw)
Hörður	Knattspyrnufélagið Vestri	1 - 0
Víkingur Ólafsvík	UMF Skallagrímur	0 - 1
Þróttur Norðfjörður	KS Siglufjörður	3 - 2
Haukar	Glímufélagið Ármann	0 - 1

== Fifth round ==
- Entry of Valur Reykjavík, Víkingur Reykjavík, ÍBA Akureyri, ÍBV Vestmannaeyjar and Fram Reykjavík.

Team 1	Team 2	Result
ÍBV Vestmannaeyjar (D2)	ÍBA Akureyri (D1)	2 - 1
Glímufélagið Ármann	Breiðablik	0 - 4 (replayed after 2–2 draw)
Þróttur Nordfjörður	Valur (D1)	0 - 15
UMF Skallagrímur	Hörður	2 - 5
Fram Reykjavík (D1)	Víkingur Reykjavík (D1)	3 - 2

== Quarter finals ==
- Entry of ÍA Akranes, ÍBK Keflavík and KR Reykjavík.

Team 1	Team 2	Result
IA Akranes	ÍBV Vestmannaeyjar	1 - 2
Fram Reykjavík	Hörður	7-1
ÍBK Keflavík	Valur Reykjavík	2 - 1
KR	Breiðablik (D2)	1 - 0

== Semi finals ==
Team 1	Team 2	Result
ÍBV Vestmannaeyjar	ÍBK Keflavík	2 - 1
Fram Reykjavík	KR Reykjavík	2 - 1

== Final ==
14 November 1970

Fram Reykjavík	2–1	ÍBV Vestmannaeyjar
Jorunðsson,	Report	Palsson

Melavöllur, Reykjavík
- Fram Reykjavík won their first Icelandic Cup and qualified for the 1971–72 European Cup Winners' Cup.

== See also ==
- 1970 Úrvalsdeild
- Icelandic Cup
