= 1995 Icelandic Cup =

Mjólkurbikarinn

Tournament details
- Country: Iceland

Final positions
- Champions: KR
- Runners-up: Fram

The 1995 Mjólkurbikarinn was the 36th season of the Icelandic national football cup. It started on 24 May 1995 and concluded with the final on 27 August 1995. The winners qualified for the qualifying round of the 1996–97 UEFA Cup Winners' Cup.

== First round ==
Team 1	Score	Team 2
24 May 1995
Smástund	1–1 (a.e.t.); 5–6 (pen)	Reynir Sandgerði
Höttur	0–5	Þróttur Neskaupstað
25 May 1995
Framherjar	1–2	ÍA U23
Snæfell	1–1 (a.e.t.); 4–1 (pen)	UMF Njarðvík
Ægir	1–0	Fram U23
Keflavík U23	6–3	Bruni
Völsungur	1–0	KS
Hvöt Blönduós	0–6	Dalvík
þór Akureyri U23	3–0	Leiftur
Einherji	0–3	Sindri
Tindastóll	0–1	Magni Grenivík
Hamar	0–12	Valur U23
ÍBV U23	4–3	FH U23
Fjölnir	0–2	Breiðablik U23
26 May 1995
KBS	4–1	GE

== Second round ==
Team 1	Score	Team 2
6 June 1995
Sindri	1–2	Þróttur Neskaupstað
Magni Grenivík	0–0 (a.e.t.); 6–5 (pen)	Dalvík
ÍBV U23	2–1	Skallagrímur
Leiknir Reykjavík	3–1	Ægir
Neisti D.	1–3	KVA
Léttir	0–5	Víðir
GG	3–1	Haukar
Völsungur	2–0	KA
þór Akureyri U23	6–0	Neisti H.
BÍ	1–3	Breiðablik U23
Selfoss	3–1	Reynir Sandgerði
7 June 1995
Huginn	0–0 (a.e.t.); 1–3 (pen)	KBS
Valur U23	4–2	Víkingur Ó.
Keflavík U23	5–1	ÍR
KR U23	2–1	Stjarnan U23
ÍA U23	10–1	Snæfell

== Third round ==
Team 1	Score	Team 2
18 June 1995
Víðir	0–5	KR
KBS	1–3	Valur
Keflavík U23	1–8	ÍA
KVA	1–6	ÍBV
Magni Grenivík	1–4	Grindavík
Breiðablik U23	0–5	Keflavík
Valur U23	4–0	Breiðablik
GG	2–9	Þróttur
Völsungur	0–2	FH
19 June 1995
KR U23	1–2	Leiftur
Leiknir Reykjavík	1–1 (a.e.t.); 2–3 (pen)	þór Akureyri
Sindri	0–5	Stjarnan
Selfoss	1–9	Fylkir
ÍBV U23	1–5	Fram
ÍA U23	2–1	Víkingur
20 June 1995
þór Akureyri U23	3–2	HK

== Fourth round ==
Team 1	Score	Team 2
28 June 1995
Fram	1–0	ÍA
Keflavík	4–0	Valur U23
Stjarnan	1–2	KR
29 June 1995
FH	0–2	Grindavík
ÍBV	2–3	þór Akureyri
Leiftur	3–6	Fylkir
Valur	3–2	Þróttur
30 June 1995
ÍA U23	1–2	þór Akureyri U23

== Quarter-finals ==
Team 1	Score	Team 2
11 July 1995
KR	0–0 (a.e.t.); 3–1 (pen)	þór Akureyri
12 July 1995
Valur	0–2	Grindavík
Fram	1–0	þór Akureyri U23
Keflavík	2–1	Fylkir

== Semi-finals ==
Team 1	Score	Team 2
31 July 1995
Fram	0–0 (a.e.t.); 5–4 (pen)	Grindavík
Keflavík	0–1	KR

== Final ==
27 August 1995

KR	2–1	Fram
Björnsson 39'; Biberčić 86'		Dadason 65'

Laugardalsvollur, Reykjavík
Attendance: 4,384
Referee: Guðmundur Stefán Maríasson
