= 1971 Icelandic Cup =

Bikarkeppni karla

Tournament details
- Country: Iceland

Final positions
- Champions: Víkingur
- Runners-up: Breiðablik

The 1971 Icelandic Cup was the 12th edition of the National Football Cup. Víkingur Reykjavík were winners.

It took place between 7 July 1969 and 9 December 1969, with the final played at Melavöllur in Reykjavík. The cup was important, as winners qualified for the UEFA Cup Winners' Cup (if a club won both the league and the cup, the defeated finalists would take their place in the Cup Winners' Cup).

Clubs playing in Europe (ÍA Akranes and ÍBV Vestmannaeyjar) did not enter until the quarter-finals. Other teams from the 1. Deild (1st division), entered at the fourth round. As with previous years, teams from the 2. Deild (2nd division) and 3. Deild played in one-legged matches. In case of a draw, the match was replayed.

Víkingur Reykjavík became the first 2. Deild team to win the competition, beating newly promoted Breiðablik Kopavogur in the final by the narrowest of margins (1–0). It was the first national trophy for the club who had a memorable season: this trophy, promotion to the 1. Deild, and qualification for Europe.

== First round ==
Team 1	Team 2	Result
UMF Selfoss	Hamar Hveragerði	6 - 0
þrottur Reykjavík	Reynir Sandgerði	4 - 3
Armann Reykjavík	FH Hafnarfjörður	2 - 1
Austri	Huginn Seyðisfjörður	6 - 2
Haukar Hafnarfjörður	Stjarnan Garðabær	forfeit

== Second round ==
Team 1	Team 2	Result
Völsungur Húsavík	Leiftur Reykjavík	forfeit
ÍB Isafjörður	Bolungarvík	2-1
KS Siglufjörður	Leiftur Ólafsfjörður	5 - 1
þrottur Nordfjörður	Austri	12 - 3
UMF Njarðvík	Víðir Garður	3 - 0
þrottur Reykjavík	UMF Selfoss	7 - 0
Haukar Hafnarfjörður	Armann Reykjavík	1 - 3
Leiknir Fáskrúðsfjörður	KS Siglufjöirður	forfeit
UMF Skallagrímur	HV Isafjörður	4 - 2

== Third round ==
Team 1	Team 2	Result
UMF Skallagrímur	ÍB Isafjörður	1 - 5
þrottur Nordfjörður	Leiknir Fáskrúðsfjörður	8 - 2
UMF Grindavík	UMF Njarðvík	1 - 4
þrottur Reykjavík	Armann Reykjavík	5 - 1
Víkingur Reykjavík	Hrönn	11 - 0
KS Siglufjörður	Völsungur Húsavík	1 - 5

== Fourth round ==
- Entry of Valur Reykjavík, Breidablik Kopavogur, ÍBA Akureyri, Fram Reykjavík, ÍBK Keflavík and KR Reykjavík.

Team 1	Team 2	Result
Völsungur Húsavík	Valur Reykjavík (D1)	0 - 1
ÍB Isafjörður	ÍBA Akureyri (D1)	2 - 3
Fram Reykjavík (D1)	KR Reykjavík (D1)	4 - 1
ÍBK Keflavík (D1)	Breiðablik Kopavogur (D1)	1 - 2
UMF Njarðvík	Víkingur Reykjavík (D2)	1 - 9
þrottur Nordfjörður	þrottur Reykjavík	2 - 6

== Quarter finals ==
- Entry of ÍA Akranes and ÍBV Vestmannaeyjar.

Team 1	Team 2	Result
Víkingur Reykjavík (D2)	ÍBA Akureyri (D1)	3 - 0
ÍA Akranes (D1)	þrottur Reykjavík (D2)	4 - 0
ÍBV Vestmannaeyjar	Fram Reykjavík (D1)	0 - 1 (Replayed after 1–1 draw)
Valur Reykjavík	Breiðablik Kopavogur	1 - 2

== Semi finals ==
Team 1	Team 2	Result
Víkingur Reykjavík (D2)	ÍA Akranes	2 - 0
Breiðablik Kopavogur	Fram Reykjavík	1 - 0

== Final ==
9 November 1971

Víkingur Reykjavík (D2)	1–0	Breiðablik Kopavogur
Olafsson	Report

Melavöllur, Reykjavík
- Víkingur Reykjavík won their first Icelandic Cup and qualified for the 1972–73 European Cup Winners' Cup.

== See also ==
- 1971 Úrvalsdeild
- Icelandic Men's Football Cup
