= 1978 Icelandic Cup =

Bikarkeppni karla

Tournament details
- Country: Iceland

Final positions
- Champions: ÍA
- Runners-up: Valur

The 1978 Icelandic Cup was the 19th edition of the National Football Cup.

It took place between 30 May 1978 and 27 August 1978, with the final played at Laugardalsvöllur in Reykjavík. The cup was important, as winners qualified for the UEFA Cup Winners' Cup (if a club won both the league and the cup, the defeated finalists would take their place in the Cup Winners' Cup).

The 10 clubs from the 1. Deild entered in the last 16, with clubs from lower tiers entering in the three preliminary rounds. Teams played one-legged matches. In case of a draw, the match was replayed at the opposition's ground.

ÍA won their first Icelandic Cup, beating Valur in the final. The club therefore qualified for Europe.

== First round ==
Team 1	Score	Team 2
30 May 1978
Leiknir Reykjavík	2–5	Oðinn
31 May 1978
Leiknir F.	2–0	Hrafnkell
Hekla	6–2	Þór Þorlákshöfn
Selfoss	3–0	IK
Stjarnan	0–4	Njarðvík
Höttur	0–5	Einherji
Víðir	1–4	Fylkir
Huginn	3–4	Austri Eskifjörður
Grindavík	1–0	Afturelding

== Second round ==
Team 1	Score	Team 2
13 June 1978
Ármann Reykjavík	4–2	Selfoss
Völsungur	1–2	KS
þór Akureyri	3–2	HSÞ-b
þrottur Norðfjörður	5–7	Austri Eskifjörður
KR	3–1	Haukar
Hekla	1–6	Fylkir
Víkingur Ó.	4–1	Njarðvík
14 June 1978
Leiftur	3–1	Arroðinn A.
Magni Grenivík	3–6	Tindastóll
ÍBÍ	5–1	Bolungarvík
Einherji	3–1	Leiknir F.
Oðinn	1–3	Grindavík

== Third round ==
Team 1	Score	Team 2
20 June 1978
Ármann Reykjavík	0–4	Víkingur Ó.
Einherji	3–1	Austri Eskifjörður
þór Akureyri	4–1	Leiftur
Fylkir	2–1	ÍBÍ
KR	3–1	Grindavík
KS	2–0	Tindastóll

== Fourth round ==
- Entry of ten teams from the 1. Deild

Team 1	Score	Team 2
4 July 1978
ÍA	3–2	KA
þór Akureyri	1–4	ÍBV
Breiðablik	2–1	Fylkir
Víkingur	0–1	KR
þróttur	4–3	Keflavík
Einherji	3–1	Víkingur Ó.
6 July 1978
KS	0–2	Valur
12 July 1978
Fram	1–0^{1}	FH

^{1} The match was replayed after a 0–0 draw.

== Quarter-finals ==
Team 1	Score	Team 2
19 July 1978
Einherji	1–6	ÍA
Breiðablik	2–0	Fram
KR	2–3	þróttur
ÍBV	0–2	Valur

== Semi-finals ==
Team 1	Score	Team 2
8 August 1978
þróttur	0–1	Valur
9 August 1978
Breiðablik	0–1	ÍA

== Final ==
27 August 1978

ÍA	1–0	Valur
Pétursson	Report

Laugardalsvöllur, Reykjavík
- ÍA won their fourth Icelandic Cup and qualified for the 1979–80 European Cup Winners' Cup.

== See also ==
- 1978 Úrvalsdeild
- Icelandic Men's Football Cup
