= 1969 Icelandic Cup =

Bikarkeppni karla

Tournament details
- Country: Iceland

Final positions
- Champions: ÍBA
- Runners-up: ÍA

The 1969 Icelandic Cup was the 10th edition of the National Football Cup.

It took place between 12 July 1969 and 7 December 1969, with the final played at Melavöllur in Reykjavík. The cup was important, as winners qualified for the UEFA Cup Winners' Cup (if a club won both the league and the cup, the defeated finalists would take their place in the Cup Winners' Cup). Teams from the Úrvalsdeild karla (1st division) did not enter until the quarter finals. In prior rounds, teams from the 2. Deild (2nd division), as well as reserve teams, played in one-legged matches. In case of a draw, lots were drawn. From the semi-finals, after a replay, lots were drawn.

ÍBA Akureyri, who had a terrible season in the 1. Deild, won their first ever Icelandic Cup, and so qualified for Europe. In another first, the final was replayed after the first match was drawn 1-1.

== First round ==
Team 1	Team 2	Result
Vestri Isafjörður	Stjarnan Gardabaer	5 - 2
þrottur Reykjavík B	FH Hafnarfjörður	0 - 1
ÍBK Keflavík B	Armann Reykjavík	1 - 2
ÍBA Akureyri B	UMF Selfoss B	4 - 1
KR Reykjavík B	þrottur Reykjavík	5 - 2
Haukar Hafnarfjörður B	UMF Njarðvík	2 - 3
Víkingur Reykjavík B	Armann Reykjavík B	4 - 0
Valur Reykjavík B	Hrönn	4 - 0
Hörður Isafjörður	Víkingur Reykjavík	1 - 6
ÍBV Vestmannaeyjar B	Haukar Hafnarfjörður	1 - 0
Völsungur Húsavík	Breiðablik Kopavogur	3 - 0

== Second round ==
- Entrance of Hamar Hveragerði, HSH, UMF Selfoss and the reserve teams from Fram Reykjavík B, IA Akranes B, Breiðablik Kopavogur B and FH Hafnarfjörður B.

Team 1	Team 2	Result
Fram Reykjavík B	Hamar Hveragerði	5 - 1
HSH	Valur Reykjavík B	2 - 5
Völsungur Húsavík	KR Reykjavík B	3 - 2
IA Akranes B	Víkingur Reykjavík B	6 - 1
FH Hafnarfjörður B	ÍBA Akureyri B	2 - 1
UMF Selfoss	FH Hafnarfjörður	2 - 0
Víkingur Reykjavík	Breiðablik Kopavogur B	4 - 1
UMF Njarðvík	Vestri Isafjörður	0 - 1
Armann Reykjavík	ÍBV Vestmannaeyjar B	1 - 4

== Third round ==
- Entrance of 7 clubs from 1. Deild

Team 1	Team 2	Result
Vestri Isafjörður	Valur Reykjavík (D1)	1 - 2
ÍBA Akureyri (D1)	IA Akranes B	3 - 2
Valur Reykjavík B	Völsungur Húsavík	3 - 2
KR Reykjavík (D1)	FH Hafnarfjörður B	4 - 0
UMF Selfoss	Fram Reykjavík B	4 - 2
Fram Reykjavík (D1)	IA Akranes (D1)	0 - 3
ÍBV Vestmannaeyjar B	Víkingur Reykjavík	1 - 2
ÍBV Vestmannaeyjar (D1)	ÍBK Keflavík (D1)	1 - 0

== Quarter finals ==
Team 1	Team 2	Result
Valur Reykjavík B	UMF Selfoss (D2)	0 - 2
Valur Reykjavík	IA Akranes	0 - 1
Víkingur Reykjavík (D2)	ÍBA Akureyri	3 - 4
KR Reykjavík	ÍBV Vestmannaeyjar (D1)	3 - 1 (match replayed after 2–2 draw)

== Semi finals ==
Team 1	Team 2	Result
ÍBA Akureyri	UMF Selfoss (D2)	3 - 1
ÍA Akranes	KR Reykjavík	4 - 1

== Final ==
30 November 1969

ÍBA Akureyri	1–1	ÍA Akranes
Jonsson	Report	Guðmundsson

Melavöllur, Reykjavík

=== Replay ===
7 December 1969

ÍBA Akureyri	3–2	ÍA Akranes
Jonatansson; Agustsson; Árnason	Report	Hallgrimsson þórdarson

Melavöllur, Reykjavík
- ÍBA Akureyri won their first Icelandic Cup and qualified for the 1970–71 European Cup Winners' Cup.

== See also ==
- 1969 Úrvalsdeild
- Icelandic Cup
