= 1964 Icelandic Cup =

Bikarkeppni karla

Tournament details
- Country: Iceland

Final positions
- Champions: KR
- Runners-up: ÍA

The 1964 Icelandic Cup was the fifth edition of the National Football Cup.

It took place between 4 August 1964 and 24 October 1964, with the final played at Melavöllur in Reykjavík. The cup became more important from this season, as winners qualified for the UEFA Cup Winners' Cup (if a club won both the league and the cup, the defeated finalists would take their place in the Cup Winners' Cup). Teams from the Úrvalsdeild karla (1st division) did not enter until the quarter finals. In prior rounds, teams from the 2. Deild (2nd division), as well as reserve teams, played in one-legged matches. In case of a draw, the match was replayed.

For the fifth consecutive year, KR Reykjavík reached the final, beating IA Akranes 4 - 0. In a first for the competition, there was a match between KR and their own reserve team, for a place in the final.

== First round ==
Team 1	Team 2	Result
Haukar Hafnarfjörður	Víkingur Reykjavík	1 - 2
IB Isafjörður	KR Reykjavík B	0 - 3
Fram Reykjavík B	þrottur Reykjavík B	3 - 0
ÍBK Keflavík B	Valur Reykjavík B	1 - 2
ÍBV Vestmannaeyjar	IA Akranes B	9 - 8

== Second round ==
- Entrance of Breiðablik Kopavogur, FH Hafnarfjörður and ÍBA Akureyri.

Team 1	Team 2	Result
Breiðablik Kopavogur	FH Hafnarfjörður	4 - 2
Fram Reykjavík B	Valur Reykjavík B	2 - 1
KR Reykjavík B	ÍBV Vestmannaeyjar	5 - 2
ÍBA Akureyri	Víkingur Reykjavík	5- 2

== Third round ==
Team 1	Team 2	Result
KR Reykjavík	Breiðablik Kopavogur	2 - 1
ÍBA Akureyri	Fram Reykjavík B	7 - 5

== Quarter finals ==
- Entrance of 6 clubs from 1. Deild

Team 1	Team 2	Result
KR Reykjavík B	ÍBK Keflavík (D1)	2 - 0
IA Akranes (D1)	þrottur Reykjavík (D1)	1 - 0
KR Reykjavík (D1)	ÍBA Akureyri	1 - 0
Fram Reykjavík (D1)	Valur Reykjavík	2 - 1

== Semi finals ==
Team 1	Team 2	Result
KR Reykjavík	KR Reykjavík B	2 - 1
IA Akranes	Fram Reykjavík	2 - 0

== Final ==
24 October 1964

KR Reykjavík	4–0	IA Akranes
Jacobsson; Gudmannsson; Own goal,	Report

Melavöllur, Reykjavík

== See also ==
- 1964 Úrvalsdeild
- Icelandic Cup
