= 1962 Icelandic Cup =

Bikarkeppni karla

Tournament details
- Country: Iceland

Final positions
- Champions: KR
- Runners-up: Fram

The 1962 Icelandic Cup was the third edition of the National Football Cup.

It took place between 12 August 1962 and 21 October 1962, with the final played at Melavöllur in Reykjavík between KR Reykjavík and IA Akranes. Teams from the Úrvalsdeild karla (1st division) did not enter until the quarter finals. In prior rounds, teams from the 2. Deild (2nd division), as well as reserve teams, played in one-legged matches. In case of a draw, the match was replayed.

For the third consecutive year, KR Reykjavík reached the final, beating Fram Reykjavík 3 - 0.

== First round ==
Team 1	Team 2	Result
Keflavík ÍF B	KR Reykjavík B	1 - 4
Víkingur Reykjavík	Breiðablik UBK	3 - 0 (game replayed after 0–0 draw)
þrottur Reykjavík	Tyr Vestmannaeyjar	0 - 3
Valur Reykjavík B	þrottur Reykjavík B	4 - 0
IA Akranes B	Fram Reykjavík B	1 - 5

== Second round ==
- Entrance of Reynir Sandgerði, ÍB Hafnarfjörður and Keflavík ÍF

Team 1	Team 2	Result
Reynir Sandgerði	Fram Reykjavík B	1 - 4
Tyr Vestmannaeyjar	KR Reykjavík B	3 - 0
Keflavík ÍF	Valur Reykjavík B	4 - 1
Breiðablik UBK	ÍB Hafnarfjörður	5- 4

== Third round ==
Team 1	Team 2	Result
Fram Reykjavík B	Tyr Vestmannaeyjar	0 - 4
Breiðablik UBK	Keflavík ÍF	1 - 6

== Quarter finals ==
- Entrance of 6 clubs from 1. Deild

Team 1	Team 2	Result
Keflavík ÍF	Tyr Vestmannaeyjar	2 - 0
ÍB Isafjörður (D1)	KR Reykjavík (D1)	1 - 4
ÍA Akranes (D1)	ÍB Akureyri (D1)	1 - 8
Fram Reykjavík (D1)	Valur Reykjavík (D1)	3 - 2

== Semi finals ==
Team 1	Team 2	Result
KR Reykjavík	ÍB Akureyri	3 - 0
Fram Reykjavík	Keflavík ÍF (D2)	2 - 1

== Final ==
21 October 1962

KR Reykjavík	3–0	Fram Reykjavík
Schram, Felixson	Report

Melavöllur, Reykjavík

== See also ==
- 1962 Úrvalsdeild
- Icelandic Cup
