= 1966 Icelandic Cup =

Bikarkeppni karla

Tournament details
- Country: Iceland

Final positions
- Champions: KR
- Runners-up: Valur

The 1966 Icelandic Cup was the seventh edition of the National Football Cup.

It took place between 16 July 1966 and 23 October 1966, with the final played at Melavöllur in Reykjavík. The cup was important, as winners qualified for the UEFA Cup Winners' Cup (if a club won both the league and the cup, the defeated finalists would take their place in the Cup Winners' Cup). Teams from the Úrvalsdeild karla (1st division) did not enter until the quarter-finals. In prior rounds, teams from the 2. Deild (2nd division), as well as reserve teams, played in one-legged matches. In case of a draw, the match was replayed.

KR Reykjavík won their 6th Cup in 7 seasons, beating the Icelandic champions, Valur Reykjavík, 1 - 0 in the final.

== First round ==
Team 1	Team 2	Result
ÍBK Keflavík B	þrottur Reykjavík B	2 - 3
FH Hafnarfjörður	IA Akranes B	3 - 1
þor Vestmannaeyjar	ÍB Isafjörður	2 - 3
Víkingur Reykjavík B	Fram Reykjavík	3 - 1
Fram Reykjavík	Breiðablik Kopavogur	5 - 1
UMF Selfoss	Valur Reykjavík B	0 - 3
Haukar Hafnarfjörður	Týr Vestmannaeyjar	0 - 1
KR Reykjavík B	ÍB Siglufjörður	3 - 0

== Second round ==
Team 1	Team 2	Result
KR Reykjavík B	Víkingur Reykjavík	1 - 0
ÍB Isafjörður	þrottur Reykjavík B	2 - 0
FH Hafnarfjörður	Týr Vestmannaeyjar	2 - 0
Fram Reykjavík	Valur Reykjavík B	4 - 2

== Third round ==
Team 1	Team 2	Result
KR Reykjavík B	ÍB Isafjörður	1 - 2
Fram Reykjavík	FH Hafnarfjörður	4 - 2

== Quarter finals ==
- Entrance of 6 clubs from 1. Deild

Team 1	Team 2	Result
þrottur Reykjavík (D1)	ÍB Isafjörður	4 - 2
KR Reykjavík (D1)	IA Akranes (D1)	10 - 0
Valur Reykjavík (D1)	ÍBA Akureyri (D1)	3 - 1
Fram Reykjavík	ÍBK Keflavík (D1)	0 - 1

== Semi finals ==
Team 1	Team 2	Result
Valur Reykjavík	þrottur Reykjavík	5 - 0
ÍBK Keflavík	KR Reykjavík	0 - 3

== Final ==
23 October 1966

KR Reykjavík	1–0	Valur Reykjavík
Kristjansson	Report

Melavöllur, Reykjavík
- KR Reykjavík won their sixth Icelandic Cup and qualified for the 1967–68 European Cup Winners' Cup.

== See also ==
- 1966 Úrvalsdeild
- Icelandic Cup
