= 1965 Icelandic Cup =

Bikarkeppni karla

Tournament details
- Country: Iceland

Final positions
- Champions: Valur
- Runners-up: ÍA

The 1965 Icelandic Cup was the sixth edition of the National Football Cup.

It took place between 31 July 1965 and 31 October 1965, with the final played at Melavöllur in Reykjavík. The cup was important, as winners qualified for the UEFA Cup Winners' Cup (if a club won both the league and the cup, the defeated finalists would take their place in the Cup Winners' Cup). Teams from the Úrvalsdeild karla (1st division) did not enter until the quarter-finals. In prior rounds, teams from the 2. Deild (2nd division), as well as reserve teams, played in one-legged matches. In case of a draw, the match was replayed.

For the first time in 5 years (since the creation of the tournament), KR Reykjavík were eliminated when they entered, in the quarter-finals. Valur Reykjavík won the Cup, beating IA Akranes 5 - 3 in the final.

== First round ==
Team 1	Team 2	Result
þor Vestmannaeyjar	ÍBK Keflavík B	3 - 2
FH Hafnarfjörður	Haukar Hafnarfjörður	3 - 2
IA Akranes B	Fram Reykjavík B	0 - 4
KR Reykjavík B	ÍBK Keflavík C	forfeit
þrottur Reykjavík B	Týr Vestmannaeyjar	0 - 8
þrottur Reykjavík	Víkingur Reykjavík	4 - 1

== Second round ==
- Entrance of Breiðablik Kopavogur and Valur Reykjavík B.

Team 1	Team 2	Result
Valur Reykjavík B	Breiðablik Kopavogur	3 - 1
Týr Vestmannaeyjar	þrottur Reykjavík	1 - 3
KR Reykjavík B	þor Vestmannaeyjar	2 - 1
Fram Reykjavík B	FH Hafnarfjörður B	1 - 2

== Third round ==
Team 1	Team 2	Result
KR Reykjavík B	þrottur Reykjavík	6 - 1
Valur Reykjavík B	FH Hafnarfjörður	3 - 4

== Quarter finals ==
- Entrance of 6 clubs from 1. Deild

Team 1	Team 2	Result
ÍBA Akureyri (D1)	KR Reykjavík (D1)	2 - 0
IA Akranes (D1)	FH Hafnarfjörður	3 - 0
ÍBK Keflavík (D1)	KR Reykjavík B	2 - 1
Fram Reykjavík (D1)	Valur Reykjavík (D1)	0 - 1

== Semi finals ==
Team 1	Team 2	Result
Valur Reykjavík	ÍBA Akureyri	3 - 2
IA Akranes	ÍBK Keflavík	2 - 0 (replayed after 1–1 draw)

== Final ==
31 October 1965

Valur Reykjavík	5–3	IA Akranes
Alfonsson, Magnusson; Elisson; Gunnarsson	Report	Gudmundsson; Hakonarsson; Larusson

Melavöllur, Reykjavík
- Valur Reykjavík won their first Icelandic Cup and qualified for the 1966–67 European Cup Winners' Cup.

== See also ==
- 1965 Úrvalsdeild
- Icelandic Cup
