= 1967 Icelandic Cup =

Bikarkeppni karla

Tournament details
- Country: Iceland

Final positions
- Champions: KR
- Runners-up: Víkingur

The 1967 Icelandic Cup was the eighth edition of the National Football Cup.

It took place between 29 July 1967 and 21 October 1967, with the final played at Melavöllur in Reykjavík. The cup was important, as winners qualified for the UEFA Cup Winners' Cup (if a club won both the league and the cup, the defeated finalists would take their place in the Cup Winners' Cup). Teams from the Úrvalsdeild karla (1st division) did not enter until the quarter finals. In prior rounds, teams from the 2. Deild (2nd division), as well as reserve teams, played in one-legged matches. In case of a draw, lots were drawn. From the semi-finals, after a replay, lots were drawn.

KR Reykjavík won their 7th Cup in 8 seasons, beating 2. Deild Víkingur Reykjavík, 3 - 0 in the final.

== Preliminary round ==
Team 1	Team 2	Result
Týr Vestmannaeyjar	þor Vestmannaeyjar	6 - 1

== First round ==
Team 1	Team 2	Result
ÍA Akranes B	ÍBK Keflavík B	3 - 2
Víkingur Reykjavík B	UMF Selfoss	0 - 1
FH Hafnarfjörður	þrottur Reykjavík B	6 - 1
Víkingur Reykjavík	Breiðablik Kopavogur	3 - 2
þrottur Reykjavík	Fram Reykjavík B	3 - 2
Haukar Hafnarfjörður	Valur Reykjavík B	3 - 2
KR Reykjavík B	ÍBA Akureyri B	3 - 2
ÍB Isafjörður	Týr Vestmannaeyjar	5 - 6

== Second round ==
Team 1	Team 2	Result
UMF Selfoss	KR Reykjavík B	1 - 3
Týr Vestmannaeyjar	FH Hafnarfjörður B	6 - 6 (Týr Vestmannaeyjar progress after drawing lots)
Víkingur Reykjavík	Haukar Hafnarfjörður	3 - 2
þrottur Reykjavík	IA Akranes B	2 - 3

== Third round ==
Team 1	Team 2	Result
KR Reykjavík B	Víkingur Reykjavík	5 - 5 (Víkingur Reykjavík won after drawing lots)
IA Akranes B	Týr Vestmannaeyjar	1 - 0

== Quarter finals ==
- Entrance of 6 clubs from 1. Deild

Team 1	Team 2	Result
IA Akranes B	Víkingur Reykjavík	2 - 3
ÍBA Akureyri (D1)	Fram Reykjavík (D1)	6 - 6 (Fram Reykjavík progress after drawing lots)
KR Reykjavík (D1)	ÍBK Keflavík (D1)	2 - 1
Valur Reykjavík (D1)	ÍA Akranes (D1)	0 - 1

== Semi finals ==
Team 1	Team 2	Result
Víkingur Reykjavík (D2)	IA Akranes	2 - 1
KR Reykjavík	Fram Reykjavík	1 - 0 (Replayed after 3–3 draw)

== Final ==
21 October 1967

KR Reykjavík	3–0	Víkingur Reykjavík (D2)
Schram; Sigmunðsson; Felixson	Report

Melavöllur, Reykjavík
- KR Reykjavík won their seventh Icelandic Cup and qualified for the 1968–69 European Cup Winners' Cup.

== See also ==
- 1967 Úrvalsdeild
- Icelandic Cup
