= 1996 Icelandic Cup =

Mjólkurbikarinn

Tournament details
- Country: Iceland

Final positions
- Champions: Keflavík
- Runners-up: ÍBV

The 1996 Mjólkurbikarinn was the 37th season of the Icelandic national football cup. It started on 21 May 1996 and concluded with the final on 25 August 1996. The winners qualified for the qualifying round of the 1997–98 UEFA Cup Winners' Cup.

== First round ==
Team 1	Score	Team 2
21 May 1996
Bruni	2–6	KR U23
23 May 1996
Sindri	2–0	Huginn
Neisti H.	0–3	Tindastóll
KVA	0–3	Leiknir F.
Ökkli	3–0	Smástund
TBR	2–4 (a.e.t.)	FH U23
24 May 1996
Höttur	3–1	Einherji
KSÁÁ	1–3	Breiðablik U23
Reynir Sandgerði	3–2	Njarðvík
HK	3–0	ÍH
Selfoss	7–2	Fylkir U23
Magni Grenivík	1–0	KS
Fram U23	2–1 (a.e.t.)	Haukar
Grótta	2–1	Víðir
GG	10–0	Reynir Hnífsdalur
Víkingur Ó.	1–0	Léttir
25 May 1996
ÍA U23	6–0	Fjölnir

== Second round ==
Team 1	Score	Team 2
1 June 1996
Þróttur Neskaupstað	1−2	Höttur
3 June 1996
FH U23	1−2	Valur U23
Grótta	1−3	Breiðablik U23
Leiknir Reykjavík	7−2	Reynir Sandgerði
Hvöt	1−4	Magni Grenivík
þór Akureyri U23	0−2	Völsungur
HK	1−2	Stjarnan U23
Víkingur	4−0	Selfoss
GG	1−5	Ægir
Fram U23	5−1	Ökkli
Dalvík	8−0	Tindastóll
ÍR	6−4 (a.e.t.)	KR U23
Afturelding	2−5	Víkingur Ó.
ÍA U23	0−2	Keflavík U23
4 June 1996
Bolungarvík	2−2 (a.e.t.); 5−4 (pen)	BÍ
11 June 1996
Leiknir F.	1−3	Sindri

== Third round ==
Team 1	Score	Team 2
18 June 1996
Stjarnan U23	0−4	Fram
20 June 1996
Höttur	1−3	ÍA
Valur U23	0−7	Valur
Víkingur	1−3	Skallagrímur
Magni Grenivík	0−3	KR
Víkingur Ó.	1−5	Fylkir
Fram U23	0−2	Breiðablik
Sindri	2−5	Stjarnan
Keflavík U23	0−3	Keflavík
Dalvík	0−7	Leiftur
Ægir	0−5	Grindavík
Leiknir Reykjavík	1−3	þór Akureyri
21 June 1996
ÍR	4−6	Þróttur
Völsungur	0−3	KA
ÍBV	6−2	Breiðablik U23
Bolungarvík	0−1	FH

== Fourth round ==
Team 1	Score	Team 2
3 July 1996
KR	1−0	Breiðablik
ÍA	3−0	Fram
Keflavík	2−0	FH
Þróttur	2−3	ÍBV
4 July 1996
Valur	3−1	Stjarnan
þór Akureyri	0−0 (a.e.t.); 6−5 (pen)	Leiftur
Fylkir	3−0	Skallagrímur
Grindavík	1−3	KA

== Quarter-finals ==
Team 1	Score	Team 2
14 July 1996
ÍA	9–2	Fylkir
Keflavík	1–1 (a.e.t.); 3−5 (pen)	ÍBV
16 July 1996
Valur	0–2	KR
18 July 1996
þór Akureyri	2–1	KA

== Semi-finals ==
Team 1	Score	Team 2
28 July 1996
ÍBV	1–0	KR
þór Akureyri	0–3	ÍA

== Final ==
25 August 1996

ÍA	2–1	ÍBV
Ingólfsson 50' (pen.); Þórðarson 53'		Guðmundsson 90' (pen.)

Laugardalsvollur, Reykjavík
Attendance: 5,200
Referee: Gylfi Þór Orrason
