= 1960 Icelandic Cup =

Bikarkeppni karla

Tournament details
- Country: Iceland

Final positions
- Champions: KR
- Runners-up: Fram

The 1960 Icelandic Cup was the first edition of the National Football Cup.

It took place between 11 August 1960 and 23 October 1960, with the final played at Melavöllur in Reykjavík between KR Reykjavík and Fram Reykjavík. Teams from the Úrvalsdeild karla (1st division) did not enter until the quarter-finals. In prior rounds, teams from the 2. Deild (2nd division), as well as reserve teams, played in one-legged matches. In case of a draw, the match was replayed.

== First round ==
Team 1	Team 2	Result
Fram Reykjavík B	KR Reykjavík B	2 - 1
ÍB Isafjörður	Valur Reykjavík B	3 - 1
Víkingur Reykjavík	IA Akranes B	0 - 6
Reynir Sandgerði	IKF	5 - 1
Knattspyrnufélagið Þróttur B	Breiðablik UBK	2 - 1
ÍB Hafnarfjörður	Knattspyrnufélagið Þróttur	6 - 0

== Second round ==
Team 1	Team 2	Result
ÍB Isafjörður	Fram Reykjavík B	2 - 0
Knattspyrnufélagið Þróttur B	IA Akranes B	4 - 1
ÍB Hafnarfjörður	Reynir Sandgerði	9 - 0

== Quarter finals ==
- Entrance of 5 clubs from 1. Deild

Team 1	Team 2	Result
ÍB Isafjörður	Knattspyrnufélagið Þróttur B	4 - 3
KR Reykjavík (D1)	ÍB Hafnarfjörður	3 - 0
ÍA Akranes (D1)	Keflavík ÍF (D1)	6 - 0
Fram Reykjavík (D1)	Valur Reykjavík (D1)	3 - 0 (replayed after 3–3 draw)

== Semi finals ==
Team 1	Team 2	Result
KR Reykjavík	ÍB Isafjörður	2 - 1
Fram Reykjavík	IA Akranes	2 - 0

== Final ==
23 October 1960

KR Reykjavík	2–0	Fram Reykjavík
Guðmannsson; Beck	Report

Melavöllur, Reykjavík

== See also ==
- 1960 Úrvalsdeild
- Icelandic Cup
