= 1968 Icelandic Cup =

Bikarkeppni karla

Tournament details
- Country: Iceland

Final positions
- Champions: ÍBV
- Runners-up: KR B

The 1968 Icelandic Cup was the ninth edition of the National Football Cup.

It took place between 21 July 1968 and 5 October 1968, with the final played at Melavöllur in Reykjavík. The cup was important, as winners qualified for the UEFA Cup Winners' Cup (if a club won both the league and the cup, the defeated finalists would take their place in the Cup Winners' Cup). Teams from the Úrvalsdeild karla (1st division) did not enter until the quarter finals. In prior rounds, teams from the 2. Deild (2nd division), as well as reserve teams, played in one-legged matches. In case of a draw, lots were drawn. From the semi-finals, after a replay, lots were drawn.

ÍBV Vestmannaeyjar, newly promoted to the 1. Deild won the Icelandic Cup for the first time in their history, and therefore progressed into Europe. Another first came when a reserve team reached the final - KR Reykjavík, who beat their own first team in the quarter final.

== Preliminary round ==
Team 1	Team 2	Result
KR Reykjavík B	Völsungur Húsavík	2–1
ÍBK Keflavík B	þrottur Reykjavík	1–5
Víðir Garður	Breiðablik Kopavogur	1–5
þrottur Reykjavík B	UMF Njarðvík	1–2
ÍBA Akureyri B	FH Hafnarfjörður	5–2
Víkingur Reykjavík	IA Akranes B	2–1

== First round ==
- Entrance of Haukar Hafnarfjörður, IA Akranes, IB Isafjörður, Breiðablik Kopavogur and the reserve teams of Fram Reykjavík B, Víkingur Reykjavík B, Valur Reykjavík B and ÍBV Vestmannaeyjar B.

Team 1	Team 2	Result
Haukar Hafnarfjörður	Víkingur Reykjavík B	0–1
Valur Reykjavík B	Breiðablik Kopavogur	0–3
UMF Njarðvík	ÍBV Vestmannaeyjar B	1–0
þrottur Reykjavík	ÍBA Akureyri	5–1
IA Akranes	Fram Reykjavík B	8–1
Víkingur Reykjavík	Breiðablik Kopavogur B	4–0
ÍB Isafjörður	KR Reykjavík B	0–2

== Second round ==
- Entrance of UMF Selfoss

Team 1	Team 2	Result
Víkingur Reykjavík	UMF Selfoss	6–5
KR Reykjavík B	Víkingur Reykjavík B	3–1
IA Akranes	UMF Njarðvík	6–2
þrottur Reykjavík	Breiðablik Kopavogur	2–0

== Third round ==
Team 1	Team 2	Result
þrottur Reykjavík	Víkingur Reykjavík	0–2
KR Reykjavík B	IA Akranes	1–0

== Quarter finals ==
- Entrance of 6 clubs from 1. Deild

Team 1	Team 2	Result
ÍBK Keflavík (D1)	ÍBV Vestmannaeyjar (D1)	5–6
ÍBA Akureyri (D1)	Valur Reykjavík (D1)	6–6 (Valur Reykjavík progress after drawing lots)
KR Reykjavík B	KR Reykjavík (D1)	4–3
Fram Reykjavík (D1)	Víkingur Reykjavík (D1)	7–4

== Semi finals ==
Team 1	Team 2	Result
ÍBV Vestmannaeyjar	Fram Reykjavík	2–1
KR Reykjavík B	Valur Reykjavík	2–1

== Final ==
21 October 1968

ÍBV Vestmannaeyjar	2–1	KR Reykjavík B
Palmason; Andersen	Report	Reynisson

Melavöllur, Reykjavík
- ÍBV Vestmannaeyjar won their first Icelandic Cup and qualified for the 1969–70 European Cup Winners' Cup.

== See also ==
- 1968 Úrvalsdeild
- Icelandic Cup
