= 1999 Icelandic Cup =

Coca-Cola bikar

Tournament details
- Country: Iceland

Final positions
- Champions: KR
- Runners-up: ÍA

The 1999 Coca-Cola bikar was the 40th season of the Icelandic national football cup. It started on 24 May 1999 and concluded with the final on 26 September 1999. The winners qualified for the qualifying round of the 2000–01 UEFA Cup.

== First round ==
Team 1	Score	Team 2
24 May 1999
Stjarnan U23	1–2	Bruni
GG	0–1	Haukar
KVA	3–0	Einherji
Neisti H.	1–2 (a.e.t.)	Magni Grenivík
Reynir Sandgerði	1–1 (a.e.t.); 4−5 (pen)	Þróttur U23
Hvöt	1–3	þór Akureyri
25 May 1999
Njarðvík	2–1	KR U23
Afturelding	2–3	Grindavík U23
Leiknir F.	0–1 (a.e.t.)	Þróttur Neskaupstað
Hamar	1–7	Fram U23
Völsungur	1–3	Tindastóll
ÍBV U23	0–2	Víkingur U23
Valur U23	2–3	Þróttur Vogum
FH U23	1–4	Breiðablik U23
Augnablik	1–4	ÍA U23
27 May 1999
Boltafélag Norðfjarðar	1–9	Huginn/Höttur

== Second round ==
Team 1	Score	Team 2
6 June 1999
Haukar	1–0	KÍB
ÍA U23	7–0	Þróttur Vogum
Ægir	1–3	Leiknir Reykjavík
Keflavík U23	1–2	Þróttur U23
Breiðablik U23	4–2	Léttir
Sindri	2–0	KVA
KS	2–1	KA
Njarðvík	2–0	Víkingur Ó.
HK	3–0	Bruni
KFR	2–5 (a.e.t.)	KFS
Víkingur U23	2–2 (a.e.t.); 4−5 (pen)	Selfoss
7 June 1999
Grindavík U23	0–3	Fram U23
Huginn/Höttur	2–1	Þróttur Neskaupstað
Víðir	7–1	Fylkir U23
Magni Grenivík	0–1	Dalvík
þór Akureyri	1–0	Tindastóll

== Third round ==
Team 1	Score	Team 2
14 June 1999
Breiðablik U23	0–8	Þróttur
15 June 1999
Leiknir Reykjavík	2–4	ÍBV
KFS	1–2	ÍR
Þróttur U23	0–3	KR
Njarðvík	0–4	ÍA
Selfoss	1–5	Stjarnan
Huginn/Höttur	2–6	Breiðablik
KS	1–3	Fylkir
þór Akureyri	1–3	Valur
Dalvík	1–4	FH
16 June 1999
Sindri	1–0	Leiftur
ÍA U23	0–4	Keflavík
Víðir	2–2 (a.e.t.); 5−3 (pen)	Fram
HK	1–6	Víkingur
Haukar	1–1 (a.e.t.); 4−2 (pen)	Skallagrímur
17 June 1999
Fram U23	3–3 (a.e.t.); 4−2 (pen)	Grindavík

== Fourth round ==
Team 1	Score	Team 2
29 June 1999
þróttur	0–1	Víkingur
Keflavík	1–3	ÍBV
Breiðablik	1–0	ÍR
FH	0–4	Stjarnan
30 June 1999
Sindri	2–0	Haukar
Valur	3–1	Víðir
KR	4–3	Fylkir
Fram U23	0–3	ÍA

== Quarter-finals ==
Team 1	Score	Team 2
7 July 1999
Víkingur	0–5	ÍA
Sindri	0–3	ÍBV
8 July 1999
Stjarnan	1–3	KR
Breiðablik	2–0	Valur

== Semi-finals ==
Team 1	Score	Team 2
4 August 1999
KR	3–0	Breiðablik
11 August 1999
ÍA	3–0	ÍBV

== Final ==
26 September 1999

KR	3–1	ÍA
Hinriksson 61'; Daníelsson 67'; Gunnlaugsson 83'		Þórðarson 71'

Laugardalsvollur, Reykjavík
Referee: Bragi Bergmann
