= Marko Tanasić =

Serbian footballer

Personal information
- Date of birth: 2 December 1964 (age 61)
- Place of birth: Aleksa Šantić, SFR Yugoslavia
- Height: 1.79 m (5 ft 10 in)
- Position: Midfielder

Senior career*
Years	Team	Apps	(Gls)
1989–1990	Spartak Subotica		
1991–1995	Keflavík	84	(13)
1996–1997	Strømsgodset	38	(9)
1998–1999	Keflavík	21	(1)
2000	Sandefjord	4	(1)

Managerial career
- 2002-2005: KS
- 2006: KS/Leiftur
- 2008-2009: Njarðvík
- 2010-2011: Jølster IL
- 2014: IBK
- 2015: Selje IL
- * Club domestic league appearances and goals

Marko Tanasić (Serbian: Марко Танасић, born 2 December 1964) is a Serbian retired football midfielder.

== Career ==
He got 38 Tippeligaen games in Norway with Strømsgodset, and was also on their losing team in the 1997 Norwegian Football Cup final in which they lost 4–2 to Vålerenga. Tanasic scored Strømsgodset's two goals. It was the second time Tanasić had lost a final, as he was on the losing end in the 1993 Cup final in Iceland between ÍA Akranes and Keflavík, 2–1. Marko Tanasić scored Keflavík's consolation goal.

After his playing career, Marko obtained UEFA's A- and B coaching license. He has since coached Njarðvík and KS/Leiftur in Iceland, and Jølster IL, Birkebeineren and Selje in Norway.
