= UMF Stokkseyri =

- Full name: Ungmennafélag Stokkseyrar
- Nickname: Stoke city fc
- Founded: 1908
- Ground: Stokkseyrarvöllur; Stokkseyri, Iceland
- Chairman: Bjarki Gylfason
- League: 5. deild karla Group B
- 2024: 5. deild karla Group B (Group A) 7th of 9
Home colours	Away colours	Third colours

UMF Stokkseyri is an Icelandic association football club. It is located in a village called Stokkseyri in the southern part of Iceland. The club currently plays in 5. deild (6th level on pyramid).

== History ==
Ungmennafélag Stokkseyrar (e. Stokkseyri's Youth Club), simply known as Stokkseyri, was established in 1908 as a general sports club and is one of the oldest sports clubs in Iceland.

== Stats history ==
Season	League	Pos.	Pl.	W	D	L	GS	GA	P	Cup	Notes
2013	4. deild (Group A)	8	14	1	0	13	10	57	3	1st round	
