= 2003 Icelandic Cup =

Visa-Bikar

Tournament details
- Country: Iceland

Final positions
- Champions: ÍA
- Runners-up: FH

The 2003 Visa-Bikar was the 44th season of the Icelandic national football cup. It started on 18 May 2003 and concluded with the final on 27 September 2003. The winners qualified for the first qualifying round of the 2004–05 UEFA Cup.

== Preliminary round ==
| Team 1 | Score | Team 2 |
|---|---|---|
18 May 2003
| Boltafélag Norðfjarðar | 2–3 | KE |

== First round ==
| Team 1 | Score | Team 2 |
|---|---|---|
20 May 2003
| HK U23 | 3–2 (a.e.t.) | Valur U23 |
| Höttur | 2–0 | Einherji |
| Völsungur U23 | 2–3 | Snörtur |
| Skallagrímur | 3–1 | ÍH |
| Neisti D. | 1–3 | Fjarðabyggð |
| Grótta | 0–2 | Haukar U23 |
| KR U23 | 4–2 (a.e.t.) | Afríka |
| Freyr | 0–4 | Breiðablik U23 |
| Víkingur Ólafsvík | 0–1 | ÍA U23 |
| ÍR U23 | 1–3 | Deiglan |
| Keflavík U23 | 7–1 | Þróttur R. U23 |
| Reynir Sandgerði | 2–3 (a.e.t.) | FH U23 |
| Grindavík U23 | 1–2 | Fram U23 |
22 May 2003
| Fjölnir | 1–2 | Númi |
| Leiknir Fáskrúðsfjörður | 4–0 | Sindri |
| Fylkir U23 | 4–3 | Léttir |
| HK | 5–0 | Leiknir Reykjavík |
| ÍR | 5–0 | Kjölur |
| Stjarnan U23 | 1–5 | Selfoss |
| Ægir | 1–2 | Austri |
| Árborg | 1–4 | Víðir |
| Hamar | 1–4 | KFS |
| Huginn | 5–0 | KE |
| Völsungur | 6–1 | KA U23 |
| Tindastóll | 5–1 | Magni |

== Second round ==
| Team 1 | Score | Team 2 |
|---|---|---|
2 June 2003
| HK | 2–0 | Haukar U23 |
| KFS | 4–1 | Fram U23 |
| Reynir Á. | 1–4 | Tindastóll |
| Völsungur | 5–0 | Leiftur/Dalvík |
| Keflavík U23 | 4–3 (a.e.t.) | Breiðablik |
| Skallagrímur | 1–2 | Deiglan |
3 June 2003
| Höttur | 4–3 | KF Fjarðabyggð |
| Víðir | 1–0 | Fylkir U23 |
| BÍ | 6–2 | Bolungarvík |
| Njarðvík | 6–1 | Breiðablik U23 |
| Leiknir Fáskrúðsfjörður | 2–6 | Huginn |
| KS | 7–2 | Snörtur |
| ÍR | 2–0 | HK U23 |
| Númi | 13–1 | Austri |
| Selfoss | 4–2 | FH U23 |
4 June 2003
| KR U23 | 3–5 (a.e.t.) | ÍA U23 |

== Third round ==
| Team 1 | Score | Team 2 |
|---|---|---|
13 June 2003
| Huginn | 0–6 | ÍA |
| Deiglan | 0–2 | Víkingur Reykjavík |
| KFS | 0–4 | ÍBV |
| HK | 2–3 | KR |
| ÍR | 1–5 | Fram |
| Tindastóll | 0–9 | Keflavík |
| Selfoss | 1–1 (a.e.t.); 3−4 (pen) | KA |
| Númi | 1–7 | Valur |
| Njarðvík | 0–0 (a.e.t.); 3−4 (pen) | Þróttur |
14 June 2003
| BÍ | 0–7 | Haukar |
| Keflavík U23 | 0–3 | Grindavík |
| ÍA U23 | 2–1 | Stjarnan |
| Völsungur | 1–5 | Fylkir |
| Höttur | 0–3 | FH |
| KS | 1–5 | Afturelding |
| Víðir | 1–2 | Þór Akureyri |

== Fourth round ==
| Team 1 | Score | Team 2 |
|---|---|---|
1 July 2003
| FH | 2–1 | Þróttur |
| Þór Akureyri | 0–2 | Víkingur Reykjavík |
| Fram | 4–2 (a.e.t.) | Haukar |
| ÍA | 1–0 | Keflavík |
| ÍBV | 0–0 (a.e.t.); 4−5 (pen) | Grindavík |
2 July 2003
| KR | 2–0 | ÍA U23 |
| Afturelding | 0–6 | Valur |
| KA | 3–0 | Fylkir |

== Quarter-finals ==
| Team 1 | Score | Team 2 |
|---|---|---|
20 July 2003
| Víkingur Reykjavík | 0–1 | KA |
| KR | 2–0 | Fram |
21 July 2003
| FH | 1–0 | Valur |
| ÍA | 1–0 | Grindavík |

== Semi-finals ==
10 September 2003

| FH | 3–2 | KR |
|---|---|---|
| Garðarsson 26', 39'; Borgvardt 73' | | Gunnlaugsson 16', 18' |

Laugardalsvöllur, Reykjavík
Attendance: 1,766
Referee: Egill Már Markússon

17 September 2003

| KA | 1–4 | ÍA |
|---|---|---|
| Sigþórsson 60' | | Reynisson 47', 53'; Gunnlaugsson 55', 90' |

Laugardalsvöllur, Reykjavík
Attendance: 905
Referee: Kristinn Jakobsson

== Final ==
27 September 2003

| ÍA | 1–0 | FH |
|---|---|---|
| Gunnlaugsson 80' |

Laugardalsvollur, Reykjavík
Attendance: 4,723
Referee: Garðar Örn Hinriksson
