= 2005 Icelandic Cup =

Visa-Bikar

Tournament details
- Country: Iceland

Final positions
- Champions: Valur
- Runners-up: Fram

The 2005 Visa-Bikar was the 46th season of the Icelandic national football cup. It started on 17 May 2005 and concluded with the final held on 24 September 2005. The winners qualified for the first qualifying round of the 2006–07 UEFA Cup.

== First round ==
| Team 1 | Score | Team 2 |
|---|---|---|
17 May 2005
| Grótta | 5–1 | GG |
| Sindri | 0–1 | Höttur |
18 May 2005
| KV | 4–2 (a.e.t.) | Hrunamenn |
19 May 2005
| Árborg | 0–0 (a.e.t.); 6−7 (pen) | Hvíti riddarinn |
| Skallagrímur | 9–2 | Ellidi |
| Neisti Hofsos | 1–3 | Reynir Arskogsstrond |
| KF Fjarðabyggð | 4–1 | KE |
| Huginn | 4–2 | Leiknir Fáskrúðsfirði |
| Hvöt | 5–1 | Magni |
| Snörtur | 3–1 | Boltfelag Husavik |
| Ægir | 1–5 | Ýmir |
20 May 2005
| Augnablik | 3–0^{1} | Afríka |
| Neisti D. | 3–1 | Boltfelag Nordfjörður |

^{1} Match awarded 3–0 to Augnablik. Originally 4–2 to Afríka.

== Second round ==
| Team 1 | Score | Team 2 |
|---|---|---|
31 May 2005
| Augnablik | 0–6 | ÍR |
| Reynir A. | 0–0 (a.e.t.); 4−3 (pen) | Hvöt |
| Snörtur | 0–7 | Leiftur/Dalvík |
| KF Fjarðabyggð | 7–0 | Neisti D. |
| Höttur | 1–5 | Huginn |
| Tindastóll | 1–3 | KS |
| Fjölnir | 9–0 | Numi |
| Selfoss | 2–3 | Njardvik |
| KV | 1–2 | Leiknir Reykjavík |
| Víkingur Ólafsvík | 4–1 | Reynir Sandgerði |
1 June 2005
| Bolungarvik | 0–8 | Stjarnan |
| Skallagrímur | 1–3 | Grótta |
| Afturelding | 10–1 | Tunglid |
| Ýmir | 1–3 | Haukar |
| Víðir | 2–1 (a.e.t.) | ÍH |
| Hamar | 0–7 | Hvíti riddarinn |

== Third round ==
| Team 1 | Score | Team 2 |
|---|---|---|
7 June 2005
| Grótta | 1–2 | ÍA |
19 June 2005
| KF Fjarðabyggð | 0–2 | Fram |
| KS | 2–4 (a.e.t.) | Fylkir |
| ÍR | 1–2 | Þór Akureyri |
| Leiftur/Dalvik | 1–2 (a.e.t.) | ÍBV |
| Njarðvík | 3–2 (a.e.t.) | Völsungur |
| Huginn | 1–4 | KA |
| Leiknir Reykjavík | 0–6 | KR |
| Hvíti riddarinn | 1–5 (a.e.t.) | HK |
| Víkingur Ólafsvík | 1–2 | Breiðablik |
20 June 2005
| Afturelding | 0–1 | Víkingur Reykjavík |
| Fjölnir | 3–4 | Keflavík |
| Víðir | 0–5 | FH |
| Reynir Árskógsströnd | 0–7 | Valur |
| Haukar | 1–1 (a.e.t.); 4−5 (pen) | Þróttur |
| Stjarnan | 0–2 | Grindavík |

== Fourth round ==
| Team 1 | Score | Team 2 |
|---|---|---|
4 July 2005
| Víkingur Reykjavík | 3–3 (a.e.t.); 5−6 (pen) | KR |
| ÍA | 2–1 (a.e.t.) | Breiðablik |
| Valur | 5–1 | Haukar |
5 July 2005
| FH | 3–1 | KA |
| Þór Akureyri | 0–3 | Fram |
| Grindavík | 0–1 | Fylkir |
| HK | 1–0 | Keflavík |
| ÍBV | 3–2 | Njarðvík |

== Quarter-finals ==
| Team 1 | Score | Team 2 |
|---|---|---|
16 July 2005
| FH | 5–1 (a.e.t.) | ÍA |
20 July 2005
| HK | 0–2 | Fylkir |
21 July 2005
| Fram | 2–1 (a.e.t.) | ÍBV |
| KR | 1–2 | Valur |

== Semi-finals ==
3 August 2005

| Fram | 2–2 (a.e.t.) | FH |
|---|---|---|
| Larusson 79' (o.g.); Henriksen 85' | | Borgvardt 28', 44' |
Penalties
| Jóhannsson (penalty scored); Henriksen (penalty missed); Ottósson (penalty scored); Guðjónsson (penalty scored); Ólason (penalty scored); Leifsson (penalty scored); Gunnarsson (penalty scored); Stefánsson (penalty scored) | 7–6 | (penalty missed) Bett; (penalty scored) Borgvardt; (penalty scored) Garðarsson; (penalty scored) Sævarsson; (penalty scored) Guðmundsson; (penalty scored) Snorrason; (penalty scored) Helgason; (penalty missed) Ásgeirsson |

Laugardalsvöllur, Reykjavík
Attendance: 1,304
Referee: Egill Már Markússon

4 August 2005

| Valur | 2–0 | Fylkir |
|---|---|---|
| Gunnlaugsson 3', 82' |

Laugardalsvöllur, Reykjavík
Attendance: 1,130
Referee: Garðar Örn Hinriksson

== Final ==
6 October 2005

| Valur | 1–0 | Fram |
|---|---|---|
| Adalsteinsson 52' |

Laugardalsvollur, Reykjavík
Attendance: 5,162
Referee: Olafur Ragnarsson
