= Marteinn Geirsson =

Icelandic footballer

Marteinn Geirsson (born 11 February 1951) is a retired footballer who was capped 67 times (over 20 of those as captain) for Iceland between 1971 and 1982, scoring 8 goals.

His clubs include Fram Reykjavik, for whom he scored the winning goals in the Cup Finals of 1973 and 1979.

He went on to coach Fram Reykjavik from 1994 to 1995.

== Trivia ==
- His son, Pétur Marteinsson, also became a professional footballer.
- He is currently the precinct captain for the Reykjavík fire department and has been a fireman for over 30 years.
