= 1972 Úrvalsdeild =

Úrvalsdeild
- Season: 1972

Statistics of Úrvalsdeild in the 1972 season.

== Overview ==
It was contested by 8 teams, and Fram won the championship. ÍBV's Tómas Pálsson was the top scorer with 15 goals.

== Final league table ==
Pos	Team	Pld	W	D	L	GF	GA	GD	Pts	Qualification or relegation
1	Fram (C)	14	8	6	0	32	17	+15	22	Qualification for the European Cup first round
2	ÍBV	14	7	4	3	37	22	+15	18	Qualification for the Cup Winners' Cup first round
3	Keflavík	14	5	5	4	26	24	+2	15	Qualification for the UEFA Cup first round
4	ÍA	14	7	1	6	24	22	+2	15	
5	Valur	14	3	7	4	20	22	−2	13	
6	Breiðablik	14	5	3	6	16	24	−8	13	
7	KR	14	4	2	8	17	26	−9	10	
8	Víkingur (R)	14	2	2	10	8	23	−15	6	Relegation to 1. deild karla

Source: rsssf.com
Rules for classification: 1) points; 2) goal difference; 3) number of goals scored.
(C) Champions; (R) Relegated

== Results ==
Each team played every opponent once home and away for a total of 14 matches.

Home \ Away	BRE	FRA	ÍA	ÍBV	ÍBK	KR	VAL	VÍK
Breiðablik		0–1	0–3	2–5	0–0	0–3	2–2	1–0
Fram	3–1		3–0	2–0	1–1	4–0	1–1	3–3
ÍA	3–0	2–3		1–4	1–3	3–2	3–0	3–0
ÍBV	2–3	4–4	2–3		6–1	2–1	1–1	2–0
Keflavík	3–4	2–3	2–0	3–3		2–1	3–3	0–0
KR	0–0	2–2	0–2	0–4	1–3		2–3	1–0
Valur	0–1	1–1	2–2	0–0	0–3	1–2		2–1
Víkingur	2–1	0–1	0–1	1–2	1–0	0–2	0–4	

Legend: Blue = home team win; Yellow = draw; Red = away team win.
