= Ungmennafélagið Snæfell =

Icelandic sports club

- Full name: Ungmennafélagið Snæfell
- Short name: Snæfell
- Founded: 23 October 1938; 87 years ago
- Based in: Stykkishólmur, Iceland
- Colours: Red, White, Blue
- Website: Snaefell

Ungmennafélagið Snæfell (Icelandic pronunciation: [ˈuŋkˌmɛnːaˌfjɛːˌlaijɪð ˈs(t)naiːˌfɛtl̥], lit. 'Snæfell Youth Club' (Note: Ungmennafélagið is the definite form of Ungmennafélag, meaning "the youth club".)), simply known as Snæfell, is a sport club in Stykkishólmur, Iceland. There are four divisions: basketball, football, Swimming and Golf.

== Basketball ==
=== Men's basketball ===
Snæfell men's team made it to the Úrvalsdeild finals in 2004, 2005 and 2008 before winning the national championship in 2010.

=== Women's basketball ===
Snæfell women's team won the national championship three times in a row, in 2014, 2015 and 2016. In 2017, it lost to Keflavík in the finals.

== Football ==
Snæfell men's team played in the 4. deild karla Group B in 2020, the fifth tier of Icelandic football, and in the Icelandic Football Cup. On May 16, 2012, Snæfell lost to Haukar 0–31 in the Football Cup.
