= ÍB Akureyri =

Icelandic association football club

Íþróttabandalag Akureyrar (Icelandic pronunciation: [ˈiːˌθrouhtaˌpantaˌlaɣ ˈaːkʏrˌeiːrar̥]) or Akureyri Sports Association, commonly known as ÍBA, is an organization which was founded on 20 December 1944, based in Akureyri in the north of Iceland. The union is a part of the National Olympic and Sports Association (ISI) and the Icelandic Youth Association (UMFÍ) and acts as a connection between the town of Akureyri and its sports clubs. Within ÍBA, 21 member associations are registered and over 40 sports are available for practitioners.

== Football team ==
Between 1944 and 1974 the two most prominent football clubs in Akureyri, Knattspyrnufélag Akureyrar (Often abbreviated to 'KA') and Þór, sent a united team under the banner of ÍBA to the Icelandic first tier made up of a selection of players from the Akureyri clubs. The club played 17 seasons in Úrvalsdeild karla.

The first time the two Akureyri clubs, KA and Þór, combined forces was against recent league champions Valur in the middle of July 1942. The teams played twice, the united team from Akureyri won one game but lost the other. The positive results gave impetus to unification ideas and in 1943 for the fourth time a team from Akureyri played in the Icelandic football league, Úrvalsdeild karla. But now it sailed under the flag of Íþróttaráð Akureyrar (In english Akureyri Sports Council) and not KA as in all the previous times.

The subsequent year, in 1944, saw the establishment of ÍB Akureyri. By 1946, a football team representing ÍBA competed in the top flight, Úrvalsdeild karla, for the first time.

From 1955 to 1974, the ÍBA team always took part in the Icelandic men's football tournament. In 1974, the two respective sports clubs ended their collaboration and started sending teams separately as KA and Þór.
