= Skallagrímur (men's football) =

- Full name: Ungmennafélagið Skallagrímur
- Founded: 3 December 1916; 103 years ago
- Ground: Skallagrímsvöllur; Borgarnes, Iceland
- Chairman: Páll Snævar Brynjarsson
- Manager: Viktor Már Jónasson & Björn Sólmar Valgeirsson
- League: 5. deild karla Group A
- 2024: 4. deild karla, 9th of 10 (relegated)
Home colours	Away colours

The Skallagrímur men's football team, commonly known as Skallagrímur (Icelandic pronunciation: [ˈskatlaˌkriːmʏr̥]), is the men's football department of Ungmennafélagið Skallagrímur, based in Borgarnes, Iceland.

== History ==
The club first participated in the Icelandic leagues in 1973. The club spent most of its history in the third tier, although they've competed nearly ten times in the second tier. The club was promoted from the second tier for the first and only time in 1996, competing in the 1997 Úrvalsdeild karla, where they finished 9th out of 10 and were relegated. Six years later the club was in the fourth tier and hasn't left it since. After the 2011 season the club announced they wouldn't compete in 2012, but would try to compete again as soon as they could. The club fielded a team again in 2013, starting in the newly established 4. deild karla.

== Trophies and achievements ==
=== Football ===
- 2. deild karla (2):
  - 1983, 1994
