= Glímufélagið Ármann =

Icelandic multi-sport club

- Nicknames: Ármenningar
- Short name: Ármann
- Founded: 15 December 1888
- Based in: Reykjavík
- Website: armenningar.is

Glímufélagið Ármann is a multi-sports club in Reykjavík, Iceland. It was founded on 15 December 1888 in Reykjavík as an Icelandic wrestling team. Today it has departments in basketball, gymnastics, judo, power lifting, swimming, skiing, taekwondo and track & field.

== History ==
Glímufélagið Ármann was founded on 15 December 1988 by a group of around 30 people. The main founders were Pétur Jónsson (1856–1908) and Pétur Helgi Hjálmarsson (1867–1941).

== Basketball ==
=== Men's basketball ===
Árman's men's basketball team was one of the founding members of the top-tier basketball league in Iceland in 1952. It won its first and only national championship in 1976.

=== Women's basketball ===
Ármann women's basketball team won the inaugural women's national championship in 1953 and added two more in 1959 and 1960.

== Football ==
=== Men's football ===
==== Trophies ====
- 2. deild karla (1):
  - 1969
- 3. deild karla (1):
  - 1982

=== Women's football ===
==== Trophies ====
- Icelandic Champions (1):
  - 1973

== Handball ==
=== Men's handball ===
==== Trophies ====
- Icelandic Champions (5):
  - 1945, 1949, 1952, 1953, 1954
- 1. deild karla: (3):
  - 1962, 1973, 1977
- 2. deild karla: (2):
  - 1982, 1984

=== Women's handball ===
==== Trophies ====
- Icelandic Champions (12):
  - 1940, 1941, 1942, 1943, 1944, 1947, 1948, 1949, 1956, 1958, 1960, 1963
- Icelandic Cup: (1):
  - 1976
