= Íþróttafélagið Huginn =

- Full name: Íþróttafélagið Huginn
- Nickname: ÍF Huginn
- Founded: January 1913; 113 years ago
- Ground: Íþróttahusiđ, Seyðisfjörður, Iceland
- Capacity: 1000 (710 seated)
- Manager: Brynjar Skúlason
- League: 3. deild karla
- 2018: 2. deild karla, 12th of 12th ▼
Home colours	Away colours

Íþróttafélagið Huginn (Icelandic pronunciation: [ˈiːˌθrouhtaˌfjɛːˌlaijɪð ˈhʏijɪn], lit. 'Huginn Sports Club' (Note: Íþróttafélagið is the definite form of Íþróttafélag, meaning "the sports club".)) is an Icelandic football club from the town of Seyðisfjörður. It was founded in December 1913. The team is currently fielding a merged senior squad with Höttur from Egilsstaðir named Höttur/Huginn, which plays in the 2. deild karla, the 4th tier of Icelandic football.
