= Finnur Kolbeinsson =

Icelandic footballer

Personal information
- Date of birth: 21 March 1972 (age 54)
- Place of birth: Iceland
- Height: 1.79 m (5 ft 10 in)
- Position: Midfielder

Youth career
- –1989: Fylkir

Senior career*
Years	Team	Apps	(Gls)
1989–1992	Fylkir	23	(4)
1992	Hibernians		
1993	KSV Bornem		
1993–1997	Fylkir	70	(5)
1997	Leiftur	2	(0)
1998–2005	Fylkir	110	(10)
2008	Elliði		
2009–2010	Carl		
2011–2012	Elliði		

International career
1989–1990	Iceland U19	3	(0)
1991–1993	Iceland U21	13	(2)
1993	Iceland	1	(0)
- * Club domestic league appearances and goals

Finnur Kolbeinsson (born 21 March 1972) is a retired Icelandic semi-professional football midfielder who made over 200 appearances for Fylkir. He also played in Malta and Belgium and was capped by Iceland at international level.

== Club career ==
A midfielder, Finnur made 287 appearances and scored 36 goals across three spells for Fylkir in his native Iceland between 1989 and 2005. He won the Icelandic Cup and three 1. deild karla championships with the club. Earlier in his career he also played in Malta and Belgium for Hibernians and KSV Bornem respectively.

== International career ==
Finnur won 15 caps and scored two goals for Iceland at youth level and won a single cap for the senior team, as a late substitute for Baldur Þór Bjarnason in a 1–0 friendly defeat to the United States on 31 August 1993.

== Personal life ==
Finnur is the father of footballer Kolbeinn Finnsson.

== Career statistics ==
Appearances and goals by club, season and competition
Club	Season	League			National cup		League cup		Europe		Other		Total	
Club	Season	Division	Apps	Goals	Apps	Goals	Apps	Goals	Apps	Goals	Apps	Goals	Apps	Goals
Fylkir	1989	Úrvalsdeild	7	1	0	0	—		—		—		7	1
Fylkir	1992	1. deild karla	16	3	6	5	—		—		—		22	8
Fylkir	Total		23	4	6	5	—		—		—		29	9
Fylkir	1993	Úrvalsdeild	17	2	1	0	—		—		—		18	2
Fylkir	1994	1. deild karla	17	3	3	0	—		—		—		20	3
Fylkir	1995	1. deild karla	18	0	3	1	—		—		—		21	1
Fylkir	1996	Úrvalsdeild	18	0	3	0	0	0	—		—		21	0
Fylkir	Total		70	5	10	1	0	0	—		—		80	6
Leiftur	1997	Úrvalsdeild	2	0	0	0	0	0	—		—		2	0
Fylkir	1998	1. deild karla	13	2	2	0	0	0	—		—		15	2
Fylkir	1999	1. deild karla	7	2	2	0	0	0	—		—		9	2
Fylkir	2000	Úrvalsdeild	14	0	2	0	0	0	—		—		16	0
Fylkir	2001	Úrvalsdeild	18	1	5	0	4	1	4 (Note: Appearances in UEFA Cup)	0	2 (Note: Appearance in Reykjavik Tournament)	0	33	2
Fylkir	2002	Úrvalsdeild	17	0	5	3	8	1	2	0	2	0	34	4
Fylkir	2003	Úrvalsdeild	17	4	2	1	1	0	2	0	2	0	24	5
Fylkir	2004	Úrvalsdeild	18	1	2	1	5	0	1 (Note: Appearance in Intertoto Cup)	1	6 (Note: 3 appearances and 1 goal in Reykjavik Tournament, 3 appearances in Canela Cup)	1	32	4
Fylkir	2005	Úrvalsdeild	6	0	0	0	7	2	—		2	0	15	2
Fylkir	Fylkir total		203	19	36	11	25	4	9	1	14	1	287	36
Career total			205	19	36	11	25	4	9	1	14	1	289	36

== Honours ==
Fylkir

- 1. deild karla: 1992, 1995, 1999
- Icelandic Cup: 2001, 2002
- Reykjavik Tournament: 2001

Individual

- Úrvalsdeild Player of the Year: 2002
