= Lárus Sigurðsson =

Icelandic footballer and manager

Personal information
- Full name: Lárus Orri Sigurðsson
- Date of birth: 4 June 1973 (age 53)
- Place of birth: Akureyri, Iceland
- Height: 6 ft 0 in (1.83 m)
- Position: Defender

Senior career*
Years	Team	Apps	(Gls)
1990–1994	Þór Akureyri	79	(6)
1994–1999	Stoke City	200	(7)
1999–2004	West Bromwich Albion	116	(1)
2005–2009	Þór Akureyri	52	(4)
2010	ÍA	2	(0)
Total		449	(18)

International career
1995–2003	Iceland	42	(2)

Managerial career
- 2006–2010: Þór Akureyri
- 2011–2013: KF
- 2017–2018: Þór Akureyri
- 2025-: ÍA
- * Club domestic league appearances and goals

Lárus Orri Sigurðsson (born 4 June 1973), known in English as Larus Sigurdsson, is an Icelandic former professional footballer, who played most notably for Stoke City and West Bromwich Albion in England.

== Club career ==
Sigurðsson was born in Akureyri and played with Þór Akureyri along with his father Sigurdur Larusson, who later became the manager. His cousin Þorvaldur Örlygsson who was playing in England for Stoke City recommended him to manager Lou Macari and he joined Stoke on trial. Lárus impressed Macari so much that he played him against Portsmouth before he had signed him. He played 23 times in 1994–95 and his performances were so good he won the player of the year award. He was an ever-present in 1995–96 as Stoke reached the play-offs where they lost to Leicester City. He missed just one match in 1996–97 in what was the club's final season at the Victoria Ground. He played in all but three matches in 1997–98 as Stoke suffered relegation to the third tier. he played 43 times in 1998–99 as Stoke failed to gain promotion and he was sold to West Bromwich Albion in August 1999 for a fee of £350,000 after making 228 appearances for Stoke.

He scored once for Albion, his goal coming in a 5–0 win over Portsmouth on 23 February 2002. After his professional career in England, Sigurðsson went home to his old club, Þór, and played 15 games for them in 2005. In summer 2006, he was appointed player-manager at Þór, a position he held until 31 May 2010 when he resigned after conflict with the board. On 20 July 2010, he joined ÍA, the club he played in as a youngster. His first senior appearance for ÍA came in a 4–2 win over Fjarðarbyggð. At the start of the 2011 season Lárus was appointed as the manager of KF, retiring as a player.

== International career ==
Sigurðsson won 42 caps, scoring two goals for Iceland. He made his debut for Iceland in a July 1995 friendly against Faroe Islands, coming on as a substitute for Izudin Dervic.

== Career statistics ==
=== Club ===
Appearances and goals by club, season and competition
Club	Season	League			FA Cup		League Cup		Other		Total	
Club	Season	Division	Apps	Goals	Apps	Goals	Apps	Goals	Apps	Goals	Apps	Goals
Þór Akureyri	1990	Úrvalsdeild karla	13	1	—		—		—		13	1
Þór Akureyri	1991	1. deild karla	16	2	—		—		—		16	2
Þór Akureyri	1992	Úrvalsdeild karla	18	1	—		—		—		18	1
Þór Akureyri	1993	Úrvalsdeild karla	17	0	—		—		—		17	0
Þór Akureyri	1994	Úrvalsdeild karla	15	2	—		—		—		15	2
Þór Akureyri	Total		79	6	—		—		—		79	6
Stoke City	1994–95	First Division	23	1	1	0	0	0	0	0	24	1
Stoke City	1995–96	First Division	46	0	2	0	3	0	4 (Note: Two Appearances in First Division play-offs and two in Anglo-Italian Cup)	0	55	0
Stoke City	1996–97	First Division	45	0	1	0	4	0	0	0	50	0
Stoke City	1997–98	First Division	43	1	1	0	5	0	—		49	1
Stoke City	1998–99	Second Division	38	4	2	0	1	0	2 (Note: Appearances in Football League Trophy)	0	43	4
Stoke City	1999–2000	Second Division	5	1	0	0	2	0	0	0	7	1
Stoke City	Total		200	7	7	0	15	0	6	0	228	7
West Bromwich Albion	1999–2000	First Division	27	0	1	0	0	0	0	0	28	0
West Bromwich Albion	2000–01	First Division	12	0	0	0	0	0	1 (Note: Appearance in First Division play-offs)	0	13	0
West Bromwich Albion	2001–02	First Division	43	1	4	0	3	0	0	0	50	1
West Bromwich Albion	2002–03	Premier League	29	0	2	0	1	0	—		32	0
West Bromwich Albion	2003–04	First Division	5	0	0	0	0	0	0	0	5	0
West Bromwich Albion	Total		116	1	7	0	4	0	1	0	128	1
Þór Akureyri	2005	1. deild karla	15	1	—		—		—		15	1
Þór Akureyri	2006	1. deild karla	11	1	—		—		—		11	1
Þór Akureyri	2007	1. deild karla	13	2	—		—		—		13	2
Þór Akureyri	2008	1. deild karla	8	0	—		—		—		8	0
Þór Akureyri	2009	1. deild karla	5	0	—		—		—		5	0
Þór Akureyri	Total		52	4	—		—		—		52	4
ÍA	2010	1. deild karla	2	0	—		—		—		2	0
Career total			449	18	14	0	19	0	7	0	489	18

=== International ===
National team	Year	Apps	Goals
Iceland	1995	1	0
Iceland	1996	9	0
Iceland	1997	8	0
Iceland	1998	6	1
Iceland	1999	7	1
Iceland	2001	3	0
Iceland	2002	3	0
Iceland	2003	5	0
Total		42	2

=== International goals ===
#	Date	Venue	Opponent	Score	Result	Competition
1.	13 May 1998	Stade Pierre de Coubertin, Cannes, France	Saudi Arabia	1–1	Draw	Friendly
2.	31 March 1999	NSC Olimpiyskyi, Kyiv, Ukraine	Ukraine	1–1	Draw	Euro 2000 qualifying
Correct as of 22 November 2016

== Honours ==
Stoke City

- Stoke City player of the year: 1995

West Bromwich Albion

- West Bromwich Albion player of the year: 2000
- Football League First Division runners-up: 2001-02
