= 1992 Icelandic Cup =

Mjólkurbikarinn

Tournament details
- Country: Iceland

Final positions
- Champions: Valur
- Runners-up: KA

The 1992 Icelandic Cup was the 33rd edition of the National Football Cup.

It took place between 16 May 1992 and 23 August 1992, with the final played at Laugardalsvöllur in Reykjavík. The cup was important, as winners qualified for the UEFA Cup Winners' Cup (if a club won both the league and the cup, the defeated finalists would take their place in the Cup Winners' Cup).

The 10 clubs from the 1. Deild entered in the last 16, with clubs from lower tiers entering in the three preliminary rounds. Teams played one-legged matches. In case of a draw, a penalty shoot-out took place (there were no replays, unlike in previous years).

Valur won their eighth Icelandic Cup, and so qualified for Europe.

== First round ==
Team 1	Score	Team 2
16 May 1992
Reynir Sandgerði	2−3	Völsungur
18 May 1992
Árvakur R.	0−2	Ármann
20 May 1992
Afturelding	1−6	Njarðvík
Grindavík	7−1	Ægir
Vikverji	2−3	Selfoss
Dalvík	1−2	Magni Grenivík
Tindastóll	5−0	Hvöt
Víkingur Ó.	0−8	BÍ
þróttur	3−0	Snæfell
HK	3−2	Skallagrímur
ÍR	1−1 (a.e.t.); 3−5 (pen)	Víðir
Haukar	0−5	Keflavík
Hvatberar	0−11	Stjarnan
Grótta	1−0	Leiknir Reykjavík
Fjölnir	0−6	Fylkir
23 May 1992
KS	6−1	Þórshöfn
26 May 1992
Sindri	0−2	Höttur
Leiknir F.	2−3	þrottur Norðfjörður
Huginn	2–4	Einherji

== Second round ==
Team 1	Score	Team 2
26 May 1992
SM	1–5	Völsungur
HK	0–7	Stjarnan
Grótta	3–3 (a.e.t.); 3−2 (pen)	þróttur
Keflavík	10–0	Ármann
Grindavík	0–2	Fylkir
KS	1–7	Leiftur
Tindastóll	3–0	Magni Grenivík
Kormákur	3–0	Neisti H.
Selfoss	2–0	Njarðvík
BÍ	4–0	Víðir
16 June 1992
Einherji	2–2 (a.e.t.); 2−4 (pen)	Valur Reyðarfjörður
þrottur Norðfjörður	5–1	Höttur

== Third round ==
Team 1	Score	Team 2
23 June 1992
Valur Reyðarfjörður	2–1	þrottur Norðfjörður
Keflavík	5–0	Grótta
Völsungur	4–3	Tindastóll
Fylkir	2–1	Stjarnan
Selfoss	2–4	BÍ
29 June 1992
Kormákur	0–4	Leiftur

== Fourth round ==
- Entry of ten teams from the 1. Deild

Team 1	Score	Team 2
7 July 1992
Breiðablik	0–3	Valur
KA	2–0	þór Akureyri
BÍ	1–4	Fram
Keflavík	1–2	FH
Völsungur	1–2	KR Reykjavík
Leiftur	2–5	Fylkir
Víkingur	3–2	ÍBV
Valur Reyðarfjörður	0–7	ÍA

== Quarter-finals ==
Team 1	Score	Team 2
21 July 1992
Valur	2–1	FH
ÍA	3–2	Víkingur
Fylkir	2–1	KR Reykjavík
KA	2–1	Fram

== Semi-finals ==
Team 1	Score	Team 2
7 August 1992
KA	2–0	ÍA
Fylkir	2–4	Valur

== Final ==
23 August 1992

Valur	5–2 (a.e.t.)	KA
Bragason 64'; Gregory 90', 102', 118'; Tómasson 113'	Report	Már Másson 30'; Örlygsson 34'

Laugardalsvöllur, Reykjavík
Attendance: 3,022
Referee: Bragi Bergmann

Valur won their eighth Icelandic Cup, and qualified for the 1993–94 European Cup Winners' Cup.

== See also ==
- 1992 Úrvalsdeild
- Icelandic Men's Football Cup
