= Einar Daníelsson =

Icelandic footballer

Personal information
- Full name: Einar Þór Daníelsson
- Date of birth: 19 January 1970 (age 56)
- Place of birth: Reykjavík, Iceland
- Position: Midfielder

Senior career*
Years	Team	Apps	(Gls)
1990–1992	UMF Grindavík	34	(16)
1992–2003	KR Reykjavík	183	(39)
1996–1997	→ Gent (loan)	0	(0)
1997–1998	→ FSV Zwickau (loan)	12	(1)
1998–1999	→ OFI (loan)	13	(1)
1999–2000	→ Stoke City (loan)	8	(1)
2000	→ Lillestrøm SK (loan)	1	(0)
2004	ÍBV	17	(4)
Total		268	(62)

International career
1991	Iceland U21	1	(0)
1993–2002	Iceland	21	(1)
- * Club domestic league appearances and goals

Einar Þór Daníelsson (born 19 January 1970) is an Icelandic former professional footballer who played in for UMF Grindavík, KR Reykjavík, Gent, FSV Zwickau, OFI, Stoke City, Lillestrøm SK, ÍBV and also for the Iceland national team.

== Club career ==
Einar played for local side KR Reykjavík before moving to Greek side OFI in 1999. He joined English side Stoke City in November 1999 along with a number of fellow countrymen following the club being taken over by a group of Icelandic businessmen. Einar made a good start scoring on his debut in a 4–0 win away at Wycombe Wanderers. However unlike some of the Icelandic players Einar failed to adapt to English football and left after making just nine appearances. He went on to play for Lillestrøm SK, KR Reykjavík, ÍBV and Grótta .

== International career ==
Einar made his debut for the Iceland national team on 17 October 1993, coming on as a late substitute for Rúnar Kristinsson in the 1–3 defeat to Tunisia. He went on to win 21 caps for his country over the following nine years, and scored his only international goal in the 4–0 win against Liechtenstein on 20 August 1997.

== Career statistics ==
=== Club ===
Appearances and goals by club, season and competition
Club	Season	League			FA Cup		League Cup		Other		Total	
Club	Season	Division	Apps	Goals	Apps	Goals	Apps	Goals	Apps	Goals	Apps	Goals
UMF Grindavík	1990	1. deild karla	17	6	—		—		—		17	6
UMF Grindavík	1991	1. deild karla	17	10	—		—		—		17	10
UMF Grindavík	Total		34	16	0	0	0	0	0	0	34	16
KR Reykjavík	1992	Úrvalsdeild	17	3	—		—		—		17	3
KR Reykjavík	1993	Úrvalsdeild	16	3	—		—		—		16	3
KR Reykjavík	1994	Úrvalsdeild	13	0	—		—		—		13	0
KR Reykjavík	1995	Úrvalsdeild	15	5	—		—		—		15	5
KR Reykjavík	1996	Úrvalsdeild	15	7	—		—		—		15	7
KR Reykjavík	1997	Úrvalsdeild	16	7	—		—		—		16	7
KR Reykjavík	1998	Úrvalsdeild	18	3	—		—		—		18	3
KR Reykjavík	1999	Úrvalsdeild	15	1	—		—		—		15	1
KR Reykjavík	2000	Úrvalsdeild	15	3	—		—		—		15	3
KR Reykjavík	2001	Úrvalsdeild	16	5	—		—		—		16	5
KR Reykjavík	2002	Úrvalsdeild	14	2	—		—		—		14	2
KR Reykjavík	2003	Úrvalsdeild	13	0	—		—		—		13	0
KR Reykjavík	Total		183	39	0	0	0	0	0	0	183	39
Gent (loan)	1996–97	Belgian First Division	0	0	—		—		—		0	0
FSV Zwickau (loan)	1997–98	2. Bundesliga	12	1	—		—		—		12	1
OFI (loan)	1998–99	Alpha Ethniki	13	1	—		—		—		13	1
Stoke City (loan)	1999–2000	Second Division	8	1	0	0	0	0	1	0	9	1
Lillestrøm SK (loan)	2000	Tippeligaen	1	0	—		—		—		1	0
ÍBV	2004	Úrvalsdeild	17	4	—		—		—		17	4
Career total			268	62	0	0	0	0	1	0	269	62

=== International ===
Appearances and goals by national team and year
National team	Year	Apps	Goals
Iceland	1993	1	0
Iceland	1995	2	0
Iceland	1996	2	0
Iceland	1997	6	1
Iceland	1998	3	0
Iceland	1999	2	0
Iceland	2000	2	0
Iceland	2002	3	0
Total		21	1
