= 1986 1. deild karla =

Icelandic football league season

The 1986 season of 1. deild karla was the 32nd season of second-tier football in Iceland.

== League table ==
Pos	Team	Pld	W	D	L	GF	GA	GD	Pts	Promotion or relegation
1	Völsungur (C, P)	18	12	2	4	38	15	+23	38	Promoted to 1987 Úrvalsdeild
2	KA (P)	18	11	4	3	54	15	+39	37	Promoted to 1987 Úrvalsdeild
3	Víkingur R.	18	10	4	4	47	20	+27	34	
4	Selfoss	18	9	4	5	33	16	+17	31	
5	Einherji	18	9	2	7	28	24	+4	29	
6	KS	18	8	4	6	32	23	+9	28	
7	Þróttur R.	18	8	2	8	43	29	+14	26	
8	ÍBÍ	18	4	6	8	27	35	−8	18	
9	Njarðvík (R)	18	4	2	12	27	57	−30	14	Relegated to 1987 2. deild
10	Skallagrímur (R)	18	0	0	18	4	99	−95	0	Relegated to 1987 2. deild

Rules for classification: 1) points; 2) goal difference; 3) number of goals scored.
(C) Champions; (P) Promoted; (R) Relegated

== Top scorers ==
Scorer	Goals	Team
(Iceland) Tryggvi Gunnarsson	28	KA
(Iceland) Andri Marteinsson	17	Víkingur R.
(Iceland) Sigurður Hallvarðsson	13	Þróttur R.
(Iceland) Jón Gunnar Bergs	12	Selfoss
(Iceland) Sigfús Kárason	12	Þróttur R.
