= 1979 2. deild karla =

Icelandic football league season

The 1979 season of 2. deild karla was the 14th season of third-tier football in Iceland.

== Group A ==
Pos	Team	Played	Points	Notes
1	Ármann	12	21	Advanced to final round
2	Njarðvík	12	15	
3	Grindavík	12	15	
4	Grótta	12	13	
5	Víðir	12	10	
6	Stjarnan	12	9	
7	ÍK	12	1	

== Group B ==
Pos	Team	Played	Points	Notes
1	Afturelding	12	24	Advanced to final round
2	Óðinn	12	18	
3	Leiknir R.	12	15	
4	Léttir	12	10	
5	Hekla	12	10	
6	Katla	12	4	
7	Þór Þ.	12	3	

== Group C ==
Pos	Team	Played	Points	Notes
1	Skallagrímur	8	13	Advanced to final round
2	Víkingur Ó.	8	12	
3	Bolungarvík	8	6	
4	Stefnir	8	5	
5	Snæfell	8	4	

== Group D ==
Pos	Team	Played	Points	Notes
1	Tindastóll	8	16	Advanced to final round
2	KS	8	11	
3	Svarfdælir	8	6	
4	Leiftur	8	5	
5	Höfðstrendingur	8	2	

== Group E ==
Pos	Team	Played	Points	Notes
1	Völsungur	8	13	Advanced to final round
2	Árroðinn	8	10	
3	HSÞ-b	8	8	
4	Reynir Á.	8	7	
5	Dagsbrún	8	2	

== Group F ==
Pos	Team	Played	Points	Notes
1	Einherji	12	20	Advanced to final round
2	Leiknir F.	12	14	
3	Sindri	12	14	
4	Hrafnkell Freysgoði	12	14	
5	Huginn	12	12	
6	Súlan	12	9	
7	Valur Reyð.	12	1	

== Final round ==
=== Group A ===
Pos	Team	Pld	W	D	L	GF	GA	GD	Pts	Promotion
1	Ármann	2	0	2	0	2	2	0	2	Promoted
2	Afturelding	2	0	2	0	1	1	0	2	
3	Tindastóll	2	0	2	0	1	1	0	2	

=== Group B ===
Pos	Team	Pld	W	D	L	GF	GA	GD	Pts	Promotion
1	Völsungur	2	2	0	0	4	2	+2	4	Promoted
2	Einherji	2	1	0	1	5	3	+2	2	
3	Skallagrímur	2	0	0	2	0	4	−4	0	

=== Final ===
Team 1	Score	Team 2
Völsungur	1–0	Ármann

Both Völsungur and Ármann won promotion to the 1980 1. deild karla.
