= Pétur Marteinsson =

Icelandic footballer

Personal information
- Full name: Pétur Hafliði Marteinsson
- Date of birth: 14 July 1973 (age 53)
- Place of birth: Reykjavík, Iceland
- Height: 1.86 m (6 ft 1 in)
- Position: Defender

Youth career
- 1990: Fram

Senior career*
Years	Team	Apps	(Gls)
1990–1991	Fram	5	(0)
1992–1993	Leiftur	34	(12)
1994–1995	Fram	32	(0)
1996–1998	Hammarby	70	(4)
1999–2001	Stabæk	63	(4)
2001–2003	Stoke City	18	(2)
2003–2006	Hammarby	48	(5)
2007–2008	KR	29	(0)
Total		299	(27)

International career
1988	Iceland U-17	1	(0)
1990	Iceland U-19	2	(2)
1992–1995	Iceland U-21	19	(0)
1993–2005	Iceland	36	(1)
- * Club domestic league appearances and goals

Pétur Hafliði Marteinsson (born 14 July 1973) is a retired Icelandic football player. He played for Hammarby IF in Sweden, Stabæk in Norway and Stoke City in England during his professional career. Marteinsson was capped 36 times and scored one goal while playing for Iceland. He is the son of former Icelandic international player Marteinn Geirsson.

Marteinsson holds an MBA degree from Reykjavik University.

== Professional career ==
Marteinsson is an operation manager in Reykjavík, living in Vesturbær, raised in Breiðholt and Ártúnsholt (local neighborhoods in the city of Reykjavik).

After his professional football career abroad, Marteinsson lived with his family in several cities, including Stockholm, Oslo, Stoke-on-Trent, and Boston. These experiences contributed to his interest in urban planning and its role in shaping urban environments.

Since 2007, when returning home to his native Iceland, Marteinsson has built small and medium-sized businesses with the goal of improving local community services and enhancing human life in Reykjavik. These include Kex Hostel and Kaffihús Vesturbæjar (Kaffi Vest).

He has also been involved in the development of housing aimed for first time buyers through his urban development firm Borgarbragur. Marteinsson has also been involved as advisor in planning sports facilities within local neighborhoods and a new national stadium in Reykjavik.

Since 2024, Marteinsson has been employed with OZ Sports, an infrastructure provider for sports broadcasting.

== Personal life ==
Marteinsson was raised in Breiðholt and Árbær (local neighborhoods in the city of Reykjavik) and is the son of former Icelandic international player Marteinn Geirsson and Hugrún Pétursdóttir. Marteinsson is married to Unnur Anna Valdimarsdóttir, professor at the University of Iceland. They have one daughter.

== Political career ==
In early January 2026, Marteinsson declared his candidacy to lead the Social Democratic Alliance, Samfylkingin, in the primaries for the May 2026 municipal elections in the City of Reykjavik.

== Club career ==
Marteinsson was born in Reykjavík and started his career in Fram. He moved to Swedish club Hammarby IF in 1996 where he was a great success. A sought-after defender, Marteinsson was bought by the Norwegian club Stabæk, coached by Anders Linderoth.

In November 2001, he moved on to English club Stoke City, joining up with a number of fellow Icelandic players. He made his debut against Peterborough United in January 2002. He made just two more appearances during the 2001–02 season and when Guðjón Þórðarson was sacked at the end of the season Marteinsson struggled to get a look in with new manager Steve Cotterill and then Tony Pulis. Marteinsson made 18 league appearances for Stoke scoring twice against Bradford City in 2002 before being released in September 2003.

He returned to Hammarby where he spent three years and made 48 appearances for "Bajen". In October 2006, KR Reykjavik announced they had signed Marteinsson for the 2007 Icelandic premier league season, a move which saw Marteinsson return to his native Iceland to finish his career in 2008. In his last season he won a cup.

== International career ==
Marteinsson was capped 36 times for Iceland. He made his debut in an August 1993 friendly match against the USA as a substitute for Kristján Jónsson.

== Career statistics ==
=== Club ===
Club	Season	League			FA Cup		League Cup		Total	
Club	Season	Division	Apps	Goals	Apps	Goals	Apps	Goals	Apps	Goals
Fram	1990	Úrvalsdeild	1	0	—		—		1	0
Fram	1991	Úrvalsdeild	4	0	—		—		4	0
Fram	Total		5	0	0	0	—		5	0
Leiftur	1992	1. deild karla	18	7	2	0	—		20	7
Leiftur	1993	1. deild karla	16	5	4	0	—		20	5
Leiftur	Total		34	12	6	0	—		40	12
Fram	1994	Úrvalsdeild	16	0	—		—		16	0
Fram	1995	Úrvalsdeild	16	0	—		—		16	0
Fram	Total		32	0	—		—		32	0
Hammarby	1996	Swedish Division 1	23	0	—		—		23	0
Hammarby	1997	Swedish Division 1	23	2	—		—		23	2
Hammarby	1998	Allsvenskan	24	2	—		—		24	2
Hammarby	Total		70	4	—		—		70	4
Stabæk	1999	Tippeligaen	18	0	—		—		18	0
Stabæk	2000	Tippeligaen	21	2	—		—		21	2
Stabæk	2001	Tippeligaen	24	2	—		—		24	2
Stabæk	Total		63	4	—		—		63	4
Stoke City	2001–02	Second Division	3	0	0	0	0	0	3	0
Stoke City	2002–03	First Division	12	2	2	0	0	0	14	2
Stoke City	2003–04	First Division	3	0	0	0	0	0	3	0
Stoke City	Total		18	2	2	0	0	0	20	2
Hammarby	2003	Allsvenskan	1	1	—		—		1	1
Hammarby	2004	Allsvenskan	19	3	—		—		19	3
Hammarby	2005	Allsvenskan	8	1	—		—		8	1
Hammarby	2006	Allsvenskan	20	0	—		—		20	0
Hammarby	Total		48	5	—		—		48	5
KR	2007	Úrvalsdeild	15	0	—		8	0	23	0
KR	2008	Úrvalsdeild	14	0	4	1	1	0	19	1
KR	Total		29	0	4	1	9	0	42	1
Career Total			299	27	12	1	9	0	320	28

=== International ===
National team	Year	Apps	Goals
Iceland	1993	1	0
Iceland	1994	1	0
Iceland	1997	1	0
Iceland	1998	4	0
Iceland	1999	6	0
Iceland	2000	5	0
Iceland	2001	6	0
Iceland	2002	1	0
Iceland	2003	2	1
Iceland	2004	6	0
Iceland	2005	3	0
Total		36	1

Scores and results list Iceland's goal tally first, score column indicates score after each Marteinsson goal.

List of international goals scored by Pétur Marteinsson
No.	Date	Venue	Opponent	Score	Result	Competition	Ref.
1	20 August 2003	Tórsvøllur, Tórshavn, Faroe Islands	Faroe Islands	2–1	2–1	UEFA Euro 2004 qualifying	
