= 1989 1. deild karla =

Icelandic football league season

The 1989 season of 1. deild karla was the 35th season of second-tier football in Iceland.

== League table ==
Pos	Team	Pld	W	D	L	GF	GA	GD	Pts	Promotion or relegation
1	Stjarnan (C, P)	18	14	1	3	44	16	+28	43	Promoted to 1990 Úrvalsdeild
2	ÍBV (P)	18	13	0	5	49	30	+19	39	Promoted to 1990 Úrvalsdeild
3	Víðir	18	12	2	4	30	21	+9	38	
4	Selfoss	18	9	1	8	23	27	−4	28	
5	Breiðablik	18	6	4	8	36	32	+4	22	
6	Tindastóll	18	6	2	10	34	28	+6	20	
7	Leiftur	18	5	5	8	15	18	−3	20	
8	ÍR	18	5	5	8	22	30	−8	20	
9	Völsungur (R)	18	4	2	12	23	44	−21	14	Relegated to 1990 2. deild
10	Einherji (R)	18	4	2	12	21	51	−30	14	Relegated to 1990 2. deild

Rules for classification: 1) points; 2) goal difference; 3) number of goals scored.
(C) Champions; (P) Promoted; (R) Relegated

== Top scorers ==
Scorer	Goals	Team
(Iceland) Eyjólfur Sverrisson	14	Tindastóll
(Iceland) Tómas Ingi Tómasson	12	ÍBV
(Iceland) Grétar Einarsson	12	Víðir
(Iceland) Jón Þórir Jónsson	12	Breiðablik
(Iceland) Árni Sveinsson	11	Stjarnan
(Iceland) Hlynur Stefánsson	9	ÍBV
