= 1978 1. deild karla =

Icelandic football league season

The 1978 season of 1. deild karla was the 24th season of second-tier football in Iceland. It is notable for being the only season KR have spent outside the top tier.

== League table ==
Pos	Team	Pld	W	D	L	GF	GA	GD	Pts	Promotion or relegation
1	KR (C, P)	18	13	4	1	48	9	+39	30	Promoted to 1979 Úrvalsdeild
2	Haukar (P)	18	8	5	5	28	24	+4	21	Promoted to 1979 Úrvalsdeild
3	ÍBÍ	18	7	6	5	31	25	+6	20	
4	Þór A.	18	7	6	5	18	16	+2	20	
5	Reynir S.	18	7	4	7	22	21	+1	18	
6	Austri	18	6	6	6	17	21	−4	18	
7	Þróttur N.	18	7	4	7	25	30	−5	18	
8	Fylkir	18	7	2	9	22	23	−1	16	
9	Ármann (R)	18	5	2	11	21	33	−12	12	Relegated to 1979 2. deild
10	Völsungur (R)	18	2	3	13	18	48	−30	7	Relegated to 1979 2. deild

Rules for classification: 1) points; 2) goal difference; 3) number of goals scored.
(C) Champions; (P) Promoted; (R) Relegated

== Top scorers ==
Scorer	Goals	Team
(Iceland) Sverrir Herbertsson	11	KR
(Iceland) Stefán Örn Sigurðsson	10	KR
(Iceland) Bjarni Kristjánsson	7	Austri
(Iceland) Sigurður Indriðason	7	KR
(Iceland) Vilhelm Fredriksen	7	KR
(Iceland) Þráinn Ásmundsson	7	Ármann
