= 1989 Úrvalsdeild =

Season of the top-level association football league in Iceland

Úrvalsdeild
- Season: 1989
- Country: Iceland
- Champions: KA
- Runner up: FH
- Relegated: Fylkir; Keflavík
- Top goalscorer: Hörður Magnússon (FH; 12)

Statistics of Úrvalsdeild in the 1989 season.

== Overview ==
The 1989 Úrvalsdeild, the top men's football league in Iceland, was contested by 10 teams. FH and Fylkir were promoted from the 1988 1. deild karla to replace Leiftur and Volsungur.

KA won the 1989 championship. FH's Hörður Magnússon was the top scorer with 12 goals.

== Final league table ==
Pos	Team	Pld	W	D	L	GF	GA	GD	Pts	Qualification or relegation
1	KA (C)	18	9	7	2	29	15	+14	34	Qualification for the European Cup first round
2	FH	18	9	5	4	27	17	+10	32	Qualification for the UEFA Cup first round
3	Fram	18	10	2	6	22	16	+6	32	Qualification for the Cup Winners' Cup first round
4	KR	18	8	5	5	28	22	+6	29	
5	Valur	18	8	4	6	21	15	+6	28	
6	ÍA	18	8	2	8	20	21	−1	26	
7	Þór	18	4	6	8	20	30	−10	18	
8	Víkingur	18	4	5	9	24	31	−7	17	
9	Fylkir (R)	18	5	2	11	18	31	−13	17	Relegation to 1. deild karla
10	Keflavík (R)	18	3	6	9	18	29	−11	15	Relegation to 1. deild karla

Source: ,
Rules for classification: 1) points; 2) goal difference; 3) number of goals scored.
(C) Champions; (R) Relegated

== Results ==
Each team played every opponent once home and away for a total of 18 matches.

Home \ Away	FH	FRA	FYL	ÍA	KA	ÍBK	KR	VAL	VÍK	ÞÓR
FH		2–0	1–2	3–2	0–0	2–1	0–3	0–1	2–2	3–0
Fram	0–0		1–0	4–1	1–3	1–1	2–1	1–0	1–0	2–0
Fylkir	0–4	0–3		0–1	1–0	0–0	1–2	3–1	1–2	3–1
ÍA	0–0	2–0	1–0		2–0	1–0	1–0	0–2	0–2	1–2
KA	1–1	3–1	2–1	1–0		2–1	4–1	1–1	3–3	1–1
Keflavík	1–2	0–1	1–0	1–3	0–2		1–3	0–0	3–2	1–1
KR	2–0	1–0	2–2	1–3	0–0	3–0		1–1	2–2	3–2
Valur	0–1	0–2	4–1	2–0	0–1	2–2	1–0		1–0	3–0
Víkingur	0–3	0–2	4–0	1–1	1–5	2–3	0–1	2–1		1–1
Þór	2–3	2–0	1–3	2–1	0–0	2–2	2–2	0–1	1–0	

Legend: Blue = home team win; Yellow = draw; Red = away team win.

== Top goalscorers ==
Rank	Player	Club	Goals
1	(Iceland) Hörður Magnússon	FH	12
2	(Iceland) Guðmundur Steinsson	Fram	9
2	(Iceland) Pétur Pétursson	KR	9
2	(Iceland) Kjartan Einarsson	Keflavík	9
5	(Iceland) Anthony Karl Gregory	KA	8
6	(Iceland) Heimir Guðjónsson	KR	6
6	(Iceland) Pálmi Jónsson	FH	6
6	(Iceland) Örn Valdimarsson	Fylkir	6
6	(Socialist Federal Republic of Yugoslavia) Goran Mićić	Víkingur	6
6	(Iceland) Þorvaldur Örlygsson	KA	6
