= Andrew Mwesigwa =

Ugandan footballer (born 1984)

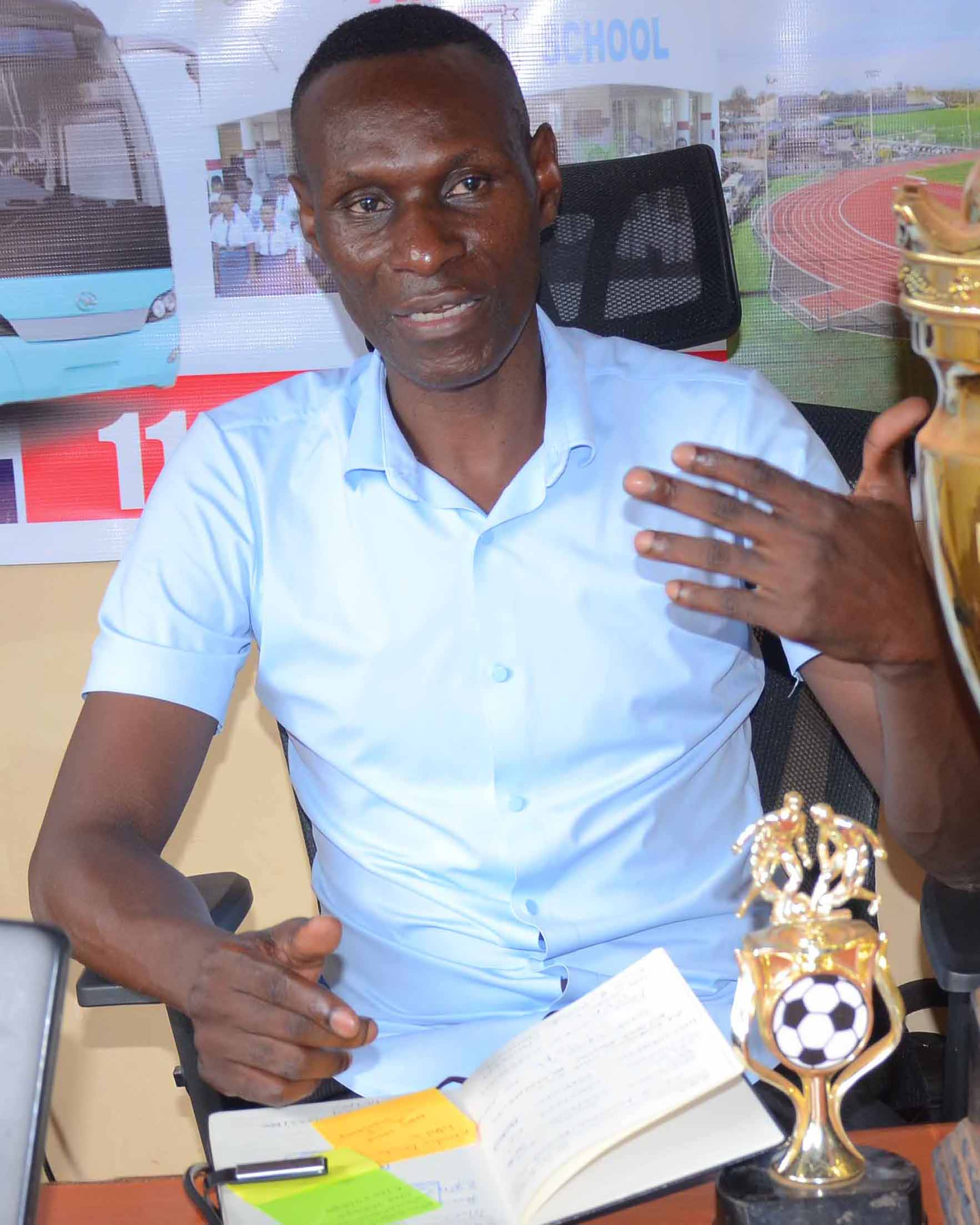

Personal information
- Date of birth: 24 April 1984 (age 42)
- Place of birth: Kamuli, Uganda
- Height: 1.80 m (5 ft 11 in)
- Position: Defender

Senior career*
Years	Team	Apps	(Gls)
2002–2005	Villa SC		
2006–2009	ÍBV	62	(1)
2010	Chongqing Lifan	8	(1)
2011–2014	Ordabasy	100	(7)
2015–2016	Yenicami Ağdelen	13	(0)
2016	Sài Gòn	23	(0)

International career^{‡}
2003–2014	Uganda	72	(7)
- * Club domestic league appearances and goals as of 12:11, 8 July 2019 (UTC) ‡ National team caps and goals as of 12:11, 8 July 2019 (UTC)

Andrew Mwesigwa (born 24 April 1984) is a Ugandan former international footballer who played as a defender.

== Career ==
=== Club career ===
Mwesigwa began his career in 2002 with Ugandan side Villa SC, before moving to Icelandic club ÍBV in 2006.

After spending the 2010 season with Chinese side Chongqing Lifan, in February 2011 he signed a two-year contract with Kazakhstan Premier League side FC Ordabasy.

In February 2013, Mwesigwa extended his contract with Ordabasy, after winning the Kazakhstan Super Cup with them in 2012. Mwesigwa left Ordabasy in December 2014.

In May 2015, Mwesigwa was reported to have signed a three-year contract with Bidvest Wits of the Premier Soccer League, but contract negotiations broke down and Mwesigwa did not sign for Bidvest Wits.

Later on in 2015, Mwesigwa played for Yenicami Ağdelen in the KTFF Süper Lig, before leaving in January 2016.

After leaving Yenicami Ağdelen, Mwesigwa went on trial with V.League 1 side Hà Nội, which in 2016 was moved to Ho Chi Minh City and renamed Sài Gòn F.C. He spent the 2016 season with Sài Gòn, making 23 league appearances.

In January 2017, Mwesigwa went on trial with former club FC Ordabasy.

=== International career ===
Mwesigwa made his international debut for Uganda in 2003.

== Career statistics ==
=== Club ===
As of match played 18 September 2016

Club	Season	League			Cup		Other		Total	
Club	Season	Division	Apps	Goals	Apps	Goals	Apps	Goals	Apps	Goals
ÍBV	2006	Úrvalsdeild	15	0	–	–	–	–	15	0
ÍBV	2007	1. deild karla	17	0	–	–	–	–	17	0
ÍBV	2008	1. deild karla	15	1	–	–	–	–	15	1
ÍBV	2009	Úrvalsdeild	15	0	–	–	–	–	15	0
ÍBV	Total		62	1	0	0	0	0	62	1
Chongqing Lifan	2010	Chinese Super League	8	1	–	–	–	–	8	1
Ordabasy	2011	Kazakhstan Premier League	30	1	5	0	0	0	35	1
Ordabasy	2012	Kazakhstan Premier League	22	3	2	0	5	0	29	3
Ordabasy	2013	Kazakhstan Premier League	26	1	0	0	0	0	26	1
Ordabasy	2014	Kazakhstan Premier League	22	2	0	0	0	0	22	2
Ordabasy	Total		100	7	7	0	5	0	112	7
Yenicami Ağdelen	2015–16	KTFF Süper Lig	13	0	–	–	–	–	13	0
Sài Gòn	2016	V.League 1	23	0	–	–	–	–	23	0
Career total			206	9	7	0	5	0	218	9

=== International ===
As of match played 19 November 2014

Uganda national team
Year	Apps	Goals
2003	1	0
2004	3	0
2005	3	0
2006	3	0
2007	6	0
2008	6	1
2009	9	1
2010	7	2
2011	8	1
2012	6	1
2013	5	0
2014	12	0
Total	69	6

=== International goals ===
Scores and results list Uganda's goal tally first.

No	Date	Venue	Opponent	Score	Result	Competition
1.	14 December 2004	Addis Ababa Stadium, Addis Ababa, Ethiopia	Sudan	1–2	1–2	2004 CECAFA Cup
2.	14 June 2008	Mandela National Stadium, Kampala, Uganda	Angola	2–0	3–1	2010 FIFA World Cup qualification
3.	11 January 2009	Mandela National Stadium, Kampala, Uganda	Burundi	2–0	5–0	2008 CECAFA Cup
4.	4 September 2010	Mandela National Stadium, Kampala, Uganda	Angola	2–0	3–0	2012 Africa Cup of Nations qualification
5.	5 December 2010	National Stadium, Dar es Salaam, Tanzania	Kenya	2–0	2–0	2010 CECAFA Cup
6.	8 December 2011	National Stadium, Dar es Salaam, Tanzania	Tanzania	1–1	3–1 (a.e.t.)	2011 CECAFA Cup
7.	16 June 2012	Mandela National Stadium, Kampala, Uganda	Congo	1–0	4–0	2013 Africa Cup of Nations qualification

== Honours ==
ÍBV

- 1. deild karla (1): 2008

Ordabasy

- Kazakhstan Cup (1): 2011
- Kazakhstan Super Cup (1): 2012
