= 1988 1. deild karla =

Icelandic football league season

The 1988 season of 1. deild karla was the 34th season of second-tier football in Iceland.

== League table ==
Pos	Team	Pld	W	D	L	GF	GA	GD	Pts	Promotion or relegation
1	FH (C, P)	18	14	2	2	47	20	+27	44	Promoted to 1989 Úrvalsdeild
2	Fylkir (P)	18	9	6	3	39	30	+9	33	Promoted to 1989 Úrvalsdeild
3	Víðir	18	8	3	7	38	31	+7	27	
4	ÍR	18	8	2	8	31	35	−4	26	
5	Selfoss	18	7	4	7	27	26	+1	25	
6	Tindastóll	18	7	2	9	27	31	−4	23	
7	Breiðablik	18	6	5	7	27	33	−6	23	
8	ÍBV	18	6	2	10	29	36	−7	20	
9	KS (R)	18	5	4	9	38	46	−8	19	Relegated to 1989 2. deild
10	Þróttur R. (R)	18	2	6	10	27	42	−15	12	Relegated to 1989 2. deild

Rules for classification: 1) points; 2) goal difference; 3) number of goals scored.
(C) Champions; (P) Promoted; (R) Relegated

== Top scorers ==
Scorer	Goals	Team
(Iceland) Pálmi Jónsson	16	FH
(Iceland) Sigurður Hallvarðsson	15	Þróttur R.
(Iceland) Heimir Karlsson	11	Víðir
(Iceland) Eyjólfur Sverrisson	10	Tindastóll
(Iceland) Jón Þórir Jónsson	10	Breiðablik
