= 1991 2. deild karla =

Icelandic football league season

The 1991 season of 2. deild karla was the 26th season of third-tier football in Iceland.

== League table ==
Pos	Team	Pld	W	D	L	GF	GA	GD	Pts	Promotion or relegation
1	Leiftur (C, P)	18	11	3	4	44	20	+24	36	Promoted to 1992 1. deild karla
2	BÍ (P)	18	9	4	5	35	24	+11	31	Promoted to 1992 1. deild karla
3	ÍK (R)	18	8	5	5	52	31	+21	29	Folded after the season (Note: ÍK was folded due to financial difficulties at the end of the season. HK took over from the club in 1992 in the lowest league, with most of ÍK's squad transferring to HK.)
4	Dalvík	18	8	3	7	39	32	+7	27	
5	Skallagrímur	18	7	6	5	42	43	−1	27	
6	Völsungur	18	7	5	6	19	26	−7	26	
7	Þróttur N.	18	6	5	7	39	33	+6	23	
8	KS	18	5	5	8	26	28	−2	20	
9	Magni	18	5	3	10	37	55	−18	18	Spared from the relegation (Note: Magni was originally relegated but regained the place after ÍK went bankrupt, winning third-placed 3. deild team Höttur in a playoff for the place.)
10	Reynir Á. (R)	18	3	3	12	23	64	−41	12	Relegated to 1992 3. deild karla

Rules for classification: 1) points; 2) goal difference; 3) number of goals scored.
(C) Champions; (P) Promoted; (R) Relegated

== Top scorers ==
Scorer	Goals	Team
(Iceland) Þorlákur Árnason	20	Leiftur
(Iceland) Eysteinn Kristinsson	14	Þróttur N.
(Iceland) Ágúst Sigurðsson	10	Dalvík
(Iceland) Ólafur Þorbergsson	10	Magni
(Iceland) Ámundi Sigmundsson	9	BÍ
(Iceland) Hörður Már Magnússon	9	ÍK
(Iceland) Hafþór Kolbeinsson	9	KS
(Iceland) Finnur Thorlacius	9	Skallagrímur
(Iceland) Valdimar K. Sigurðsson	9	Skallagrímur
