= 1993 2. deild karla =

Icelandic football league season

The 1993 season of 2. deild karla was the 28th season of third-tier football in Iceland.

== League table ==
Pos	Team	Pld	W	D	L	GF	GA	GD	Pts	Promotion or relegation
1	Selfoss (C, P)	18	13	3	2	33	18	+15	42	Promoted to 1994 1. deild karla
2	HK (P)	18	10	4	4	54	28	+26	34	Promoted to 1994 1. deild karla
3	Völsungur	18	9	5	4	39	27	+12	32	
4	Víðir	18	7	5	6	31	26	+5	26	
5	Dalvík	18	7	1	10	23	34	−11	22	
6	Haukar	18	6	3	9	31	45	−14	21	
7	Skallagrímur	18	5	5	8	36	40	−4	20	
8	Reynir S.	18	5	5	8	30	34	−4	20	
9	Magni (R)	18	5	5	8	22	31	−9	20	Relegated to 1994 3. deild karla
10	Grótta (R)	18	3	4	11	26	42	−16	13	Relegated to 1994 3. deild karla

Rules for classification: 1) points; 2) goal difference; 3) number of goals scored.
(C) Champions; (P) Promoted; (R) Relegated
