= 2002 Icelandic Cup =

Coca-Cola bikar

Tournament details
- Country: Iceland

Final positions
- Champions: Fylkir
- Runners-up: Fram

The 2002 Coca-Cola bikar was the 43rd season of the Icelandic national football cup. It started on 22 May 2002 and concluded with the final on 28 September 2002. The winners qualified for the qualifying round of the 2003–04 UEFA Cup.

== First round ==
Team 1	Score	Team 2
22 May 2002
KR U23	3–4	Valur U23
ÍA U23	9–0	Þróttur Vogum
Reynir Sandgerði	2–1	ÍH
Efling	0–9	Magni
Ægir	0–7	KFS
Leiknir Reykjavík U23	2–7	Breiðablik U23
FH U23	2–0	Stjarnan U23
Grótta	1–5	Keflavík U23
Þróttur R. U23	4–1	Árborg
Leiknir F.	3–4	Neisti D.
Víkingur Reykjavík U23	1–2	ÍR U23
23 May 2002
HK U23	0–1	HSH
Tindastóll	12–1	Smári
Víðir	2–0	Deiglan
Grindavík U23	0–0 (a.e.t.); 5−4 (pen)	Úlfarnir
Skallagrímur	0–2	Njarðvík
KS	4–2	Neisti H.
Afturelding	9–0	Haukar U23
Bruni	0–3	Léttir
Leiknir Reykjavík	1–6	Fjölnir
24 May 2002
GE	1–4	Víðir

== Second round ==
Team 1	Score	Team 2
3 June 2002
ÍA U23	1–0	HK
Reynir Sandgerði	1–2	Afturelding
FH U23	3–1	Breiðablik U23
Fjölnir	1–5	Njarðvík
4 June 2002
Grindavík U23	0–1 (a.e.t.)	HSH
Léttir	0–3	ÍR
Tindastóll	3–0	KS
Sindri	6–0	Neisti D.
Fylkir U23	2–1	Valur U23
Huginn/Höttur	1–2	Fjarðabyggð
Fram U23	1–2	Keflavík U23
KFS	4–1	Þróttur R. U23
Völsungur	1–3	Magni
Bolungarvík	0–1 (a.e.t.)	BÍ
Haukar	2–1	Víðir
5 June 2002
Selfoss	0–0 (a.e.t.); 4−2 (pen)	ÍR U23

== Third round ==
Team 1	Score	Team 2
14 June 2002
Njarðvík	1–3	KA
Afturelding	0–1	Þróttur R.
Tindastóll	0–5	Þór Akureyri
Magni	1–4	FH
HSH	0–7	ÍA
BÍ	0–8	Grindavík
Selfoss	0–4	Keflavík
KFS	0–4	KR
Haukar	1–2	Fylkir
15 June 2002
Sindri	0–3	Valur
ÍR	1–2	Leiftur/Dalvík
Fylkir U23	0–2	Stjarnan
Fjarðabyggð	1–3	Breiðablik
ÍBV	2–1	FH U23
ÍA U23	3–2	Víkingur Reykjavík
Keflavík U23	0–2	Fram

== Fourth round ==
Team 1	Score	Team 2
2 July 2002
Leiftur/Dalvík	2–1	Valur
KR	0–1	Fram
ÍA	1–0	Grindavík
Breiðablik	2–2 (a.e.t.); 7−6 (pen)	Þór Akureyri
3 July 2002
ÍBV	2–0	Þróttur R.
Keflavík	3–3 (a.e.t.); 10−9 (pen)	ÍA U23
Fylkir	4–1	FH
Stjarnan	0–0 (a.e.t.); 4−5 (pen)	KA

== Quarter-finals ==
Team 1	Score	Team 2
21 July 2002
Fylkir	4–1	ÍA
KA	3–0	Breiðablik
22 July 2002
Fram	3–1	Keflavík
ÍBV	1–0	Leiftur/Dalvík

== Semi-finals ==
10 September 2002

ÍBV	1–2	Fram
Hjarðar 48'		Sveinsson 71'; Brooks 78'

Laugardalsvöllur, Reykjavík
Attendance: 794
Referee: Kristinn Jakobsson

11 September 2002

KA	2–3	Fylkir
Hringsson 71'; Sigbjörnsson 88'		Kolbeinsson 7'; Gíslason 28' (pen.), 45'

Laugardalsvöllur, Reykjavík
Attendance: 1,295
Referee: Gylfi Þór Orrason

== Final ==
28 September 2002

Fram	1–3	Fylkir
Ottósson 43'		Gíslason 19'; Sverrisson 55'; Óskarsson 78'

Laugardalsvollur, Reykjavík
Attendance: 3,376
Referee: Egill Már Markússon
