= 1985 1. deild karla =

Icelandic football league season

The 1985 season of 1. deild karla was the 31st season of second-tier football in Iceland.

== League table ==
Pos	Team	Pld	W	D	L	GF	GA	GD	Pts	Promotion or relegation
1	ÍBV (C, P)	18	11	6	1	45	13	+32	39	Promoted to 1986 Úrvalsdeild
2	Breiðablik (P)	18	11	4	3	31	15	+16	37	Promoted to 1986 Úrvalsdeild
3	KA	18	11	3	4	36	17	+19	36	
4	KS	18	7	4	7	25	25	0	25	
5	Skallagrímur	18	7	4	7	27	39	−12	25	
6	Völsungur	18	7	3	8	28	25	+3	24	
7	Njarðvík	18	5	4	9	14	29	−15	19	
8	ÍBÍ	18	3	8	7	16	27	−11	17	
9	Fylkir (R)	18	4	3	11	19	25	−6	15	Relegated to 1986 2. deild
10	Leiftur (R)	18	3	3	12	18	44	−26	12	Relegated to 1986 2. deild

Rules for classification: 1) points; 2) goal difference; 3) number of goals scored.
(C) Champions; (P) Promoted; (R) Relegated

== Top scorers ==
Scorer	Goals	Team
(Iceland) Tryggvi Gunnarsson	16	KA
(Iceland) Tómas Pálsson	14	ÍBV
(Iceland) Jón Þórir Jónsson	11	Breiðablik
(Iceland) Hlynur Stefánsson	9	ÍBV
(Iceland) Ómar Jóhannsson	9	ÍBV
