= 2008 2. deild karla =

Icelandic football league season

The 2008 season of 2. deild karla was the 43rd season of third-tier football in Iceland.

== League table ==
Pos	Team	Pld	W	D	L	GF	GA	GD	Pts	Promotion or relegation
1	ÍR (C, P)	22	18	3	1	63	27	+36	57	Promoted to 2009 1. deild karla
2	Afturelding (P)	22	12	4	6	48	25	+23	40	Promoted to 2009 1. deild karla
3	Víðir	22	10	6	6	52	40	+12	36	
4	Hvöt	22	11	3	8	46	38	+8	36	
5	Magni	22	9	3	10	39	44	−5	30	
6	Tindastóll	22	6	9	7	36	37	−1	27	
7	Grótta	22	7	6	9	39	45	−6	27	
8	Reynir S.	22	6	7	9	45	56	−11	25	
9	Höttur	22	6	6	10	34	41	−7	24	
10	Hamar	22	6	4	12	37	49	−12	22	
11	ÍH (R)	22	5	6	11	37	59	−22	21	Relegated to 2009 3. deild karla
12	Völsungur (R)	22	3	9	10	32	47	−15	18	Relegated to 2009 3. deild karla

Source: RSSSF Page
Rules for classification: 1) points; 2) goal difference; 3) number of goals scored.
(C) Champions; (P) Promoted; (R) Relegated

== Top scorers ==
Scorer	Goals	Team
(Iceland) Elías Ingi Árnason	21	ÍR
(England) Paul Clapson	18	Afturelding
(Iceland) Árni Freyr Guðnason	17	ÍR
(Iceland) Knútur Rúnar Jónsson	12	Víðir
(Iceland) Jóhann Magni Jóhannsson	11	Reynir S.
(Bosnia and Herzegovina) Mirnes Smajlovic	10	Hvöt
(Serbia) Slavisa Mitic	10	Víðir
