= 2020 1. deild karla =

1. deild karla
- Season: 2020
- Champions: Keflavík
- Promoted: Keflavík; Leiknir Reykjavík
- Relegated: Magni; Leiknir Fáskrúðsfjörður

The 2020 1. deild karla (English: Men's First Division) is the 66th season of second-tier Icelandic football. Twelve teams contest the league. The season began on 19 June.

== Teams ==
The league was contested by twelve clubs. Eight remained in the division from the 2019 season.

Team	Location
Afturelding	Mosfellsbær
Fram	Reykjavík
Grindavík	Grindavík
Keflavík	Keflavík
Leiknir Fáskrúðsfjörður	Fáskrúðsfjörður
Leiknir Reykjavík	Reykjavík
Magni	Grenivík
Vestri	Ísafjörður
Víkingur Ólafsvík	Ólafsvík
ÍBV	Vestmannaeyjar
Þór	Akureyri
Þróttur Reykjavík	Reykjavík

== League table ==
Pos	Team	Pld	W	D	L	GF	GA	GD	Pts	PPG	Promotion or relegation
1	Keflavík (C, P)	19	13	4	2	57	27	+30	43	2.26	Promotion to 2021 Úrvalsdeild
2	Leiknir Reykjavík (P)	20	13	3	4	50	22	+28	42	2.10	Promotion to 2021 Úrvalsdeild
3	Fram	20	12	6	2	41	24	+17	42	2.10	
4	Grindavík	19	8	8	3	40	31	+9	32	1.68	
5	Þór	20	9	4	7	37	35	+2	31	1.55	
6	ÍBV	20	7	9	4	33	27	+6	30	1.50	
7	Vestri	20	8	5	7	29	28	+1	29	1.45	
8	Afturelding	20	7	4	9	37	33	+4	25	1.25	
9	Víkingur Ólafsvík	20	5	4	11	26	44	−18	19	0.95	
10	Þróttur Reykjavík	20	3	3	14	15	39	−24	12	0.60	
11	Magni (R)	20	3	3	14	22	47	−25	12	0.60	Relegation to 2021 2. deild karla
12	Leiknir Fáskrúðsfjörður (R)	20	3	3	14	19	49	−30	12	0.60	Relegation to 2021 2. deild karla

Source: ksí.is
Rules for classification: 1) Points won; 2) Total goal difference; 3) Total goals scored; 4) Points in head-to-head matches; 5) Goal difference in h-t-h matches; 6) Goals scored in h-t-h matches; 7) Away goals in h-t-h matches; 8) Draw.
(C) Champions; (P) Promoted; (R) Relegated

== Results ==
Home \ Away	AFT	FRA	GRI	KEF	LEF	LER	MAG	VES	VÍK	ÞRÓ	ÞÓR	ÍBV
Afturelding					4–0	2–3	7–0					1–2
Fram	1–0				3–0	2–5					6–1	
Grindavík	2–2	1–1		4–4						1–0		
Keflavík	5–1					1–2		4–1			2–1	
Leiknir Fáskrúðsfjörður				1–1				0–1		1–0	2–3	
Leiknir Reykjavík	3–0	0–1		5–1	2–1		2–1	0–0	5–0	1–2	3–3	2–4
Magni	3–2	1–2	3–3	1–4	0–2	0–1			1–2	1–1	3–4	0–0
Vestri		1–2	2–3	1–3	2–0	1–0	2–1		3–3	1–0	4–1	3–3
Víkingur Ólafsvík	1–3	1–2	2–2	0–4	3–0	1–3	3–2	2–0		1–2		1–1
Þróttur Reykjavík	1–2	2–2	2–4	0–4	0–0	1–3	0–1	2–1			0–2	0–3
Þór	1–1	0–2	2–1	1–3	5–1		3–0	0–1	1–0	3–0		1–1
ÍBV	1–0		1–1	1–3	0–0	0–2	2–0	1–3	2–0	3–0	2–2	

Updated to match(es) played on 7 October 2020. Source: Soccerway
Legend: Blue = home team win; Yellow = draw; Red = away team win.
