= 1982 1. deild karla =

Icelandic football league season

The 1982 season of 1. deild karla was the 28th season of second-tier football in Iceland.

== League table ==
Pos	Team	Pld	W	D	L	GF	GA	GD	Pts	Promotion or relegation
1	Þróttur R. (C, P)	18	12	5	1	27	8	+19	29	Promoted to 1983 Úrvalsdeild
2	Þór A. (P)	18	8	7	3	36	19	+17	23	Promoted to 1983 Úrvalsdeild
3	Reynir S.	18	9	3	6	26	16	+10	21	
4	FH	18	7	6	5	21	23	−2	20	
5	Völsungur	18	5	6	7	20	21	−1	16	
6	Njarðvík	18	5	5	8	24	30	−6	15	
7	Einherji	18	6	3	9	24	31	−7	15	
8	Fylkir	18	1	12	5	12	18	−6	14	
9	Skallagrímur (R)	18	5	4	9	22	31	−9	14	Relegated to 1983 2. deild
10	Þróttur N. (R)	18	5	3	10	10	25	−15	13	Relegated to 1983 2. deild

Rules for classification: 1) points; 2) goal difference; 3) number of goals scored.
(C) Champions; (P) Promoted; (R) Relegated

== Top scorers ==
Scorer	Goals	Team
(Iceland) Jón Halldórsson	9	Njarðvík
(Iceland) Guðjón Guðmundsson	8	Þór A.
(Iceland) Kristján Kristjánsson	8	Völsungur
(Iceland) Sverrir Pétursson	8	Þróttur R.
(Iceland) Pálmi Jónsson	7	FH
(Iceland) Þórður Karlsson	7	Njarðvík
(Iceland) Örn Guðmundsson	7	Þór A.
