= 1987 1. deild karla =

Icelandic football league season

The 1987 season of 1. deild karla was the 33rd season of second-tier football in Iceland.

== League table ==
Pos	Team	Pld	W	D	L	GF	GA	GD	Pts	Promotion or relegation
1	Víkingur R. (C, P)	18	11	2	5	35	26	+9	35	Promoted to 1988 Úrvalsdeild
2	Leiftur (P)	18	9	5	4	32	22	+10	32	Promoted to 1988 Úrvalsdeild
3	Breiðablik	18	9	2	7	34	23	+11	29	
4	Selfoss	18	8	5	5	30	28	+2	29	
5	Þróttur R.	18	9	1	8	35	31	+4	28	
6	ÍBV	18	7	5	6	35	30	+5	26	
7	KS	18	7	4	7	33	32	+1	25	
8	ÍR	18	7	4	7	33	34	−1	25	
9	Einherji (R)	18	5	4	9	21	35	−14	19	Relegated to 1988 2. deild
10	ÍBÍ (R)	18	2	0	16	22	54	−32	6	Relegated to 1988 2. deild

Rules for classification: 1) points; 2) goal difference; 3) number of goals scored.
(C) Champions; (P) Promoted; (R) Relegated

== Top scorers ==
Scorer	Goals	Team
(Iceland) Heimir Karlsson	16	ÍR
(Iceland) Jón Þórir Jónsson	13	Breiðablik
(Iceland) Trausti Ómarsson	13	Víkingur R.
(Iceland) Jón Gunnar Bergs	12	Selfoss
(Iceland) Björn Bjartmarz	9	Víkingur R.
(Iceland) Hafþór Kolbeinsson	9	KS
(Iceland) Sigurður Hallvarðsson	9	Þróttur R.
