= 2010 2. deild karla =

2. deild karla
- Season: 2010
- Matches: 132
- Goals: 437 (3.31 per match)
- Biggest home win: BÍ/Bolungarvík 7-1 Hvöt
- Biggest away win: Reynir S. 4-10 BÍ/Bolungarvík
- Highest scoring: Reynir S. 4-10 BÍ/Bolungarvík

The 2010 season of 2. deild karla is the 45th season of second-tier football in Iceland.

== Stadia and locations ==
Location of teams in the 2. deild karla 2010

Team	Location	Stadium	Stadium capacity
Afturelding	Mosfellsbær	Varmárvöllur	2,500
BÍ/Bolungarvík	Ísafjörður/Bolungarvík	Torfnesvöllur	800
Hamar	Hveragerði	Grýluvöllur	2,000
Höttur	Egilsstaðir	Vilhjálmsvöllur	500
Hvöt	Blönduós	Blönduósvöllur	1,000
ÍH	Hafnarfjörður	Ásvellir	1,400
KS/Leiftur	Siglufjörður	Siglufjarðarvöllur	1,000
KV	Reykjavík	KV-Park við Frostaskjól	1,325
Reynir S.	Sandgerði	Sparisjóðsvöllur	1,500
Víðir	Garður	Garðsvöllur	2,000
Vikingur Ó.	Ólafsvík	Ólafsvíkurvöllur	800
Völsungur	Húsavík	Húsavíkurvöllur	1,000

== League table ==
Pos	Team	Pld	W	D	L	GF	GA	GD	Pts	Promotion or relegation
1	Víkingur Ólafsvík (C, P)	22	18	4	0	56	19	+37	58	Promotion to 2011 1. deild karla
2	BÍ/Bolungarvík (P)	22	15	2	5	58	28	+30	47	Promotion to 2011 1. deild karla
3	Völsungur	22	13	4	5	37	25	+12	43	
4	Höttur	22	11	3	8	39	31	+8	36	
5	Hvöt	22	9	5	8	32	34	−2	32	
6	Reynir S.	22	9	4	9	44	43	+1	31	
7	Afturelding	22	7	7	8	32	38	−6	28	
8	Hamar	22	8	2	12	26	42	−16	26	
9	KS/Leiftur	22	6	6	10	39	47	−8	24	
10	ÍH	22	6	2	14	20	35	−15	20	
11	Víðir (R)	22	6	1	15	33	41	−8	19	Relegation to 2011 3. deild karla
12	KV (R)	22	2	4	16	21	54	−33	10	Relegation to 2011 3. deild karla

Updated to match(es) played on 18 September 2010. Source: ksi.is (in Icelandic)
Rules for classification: 1) points; 2) goal difference; 3) number of goals scored.
(C) Champions; (P) Promoted; (R) Relegated

== Results ==
Each team play every opponent once home and away for a total of 22 matches.

Home \ Away	AFT	BÍB	HAM	HÖT	HVÖ	ÍH	KSL	KV	REY	VIÐ	VÓL	VÖL
Afturelding		2–1	0–2	1–1	2–2	1–0	3–3	4–1	0–1	3–1	1–1	1–1
BÍ/Bolungarvík	1–3		3–1	3–0	7–1	4–2	3–0	3–0	2–1	4–2	2–5	0–3
Hamar	0–1	0–5		2–1	0–1	2–0	4–3	4–0	1–1	1–0	0–2	0–0
Höttur	2–1	0–1	5–0		1–1	2–1	4–3	4–1	4–2	1–0	1–2	1–0
Hvöt	2–1	0–0	2–0	1–3		1–0	0–0	3–1	2–0	2–1	0–1	0–2
ÍH	0–0	0–3	3–0	0–2	2–0		1–2	2–2	0–1	1–0	0–1	2–0
KS/Leiftur	3–1	0–1	1–3	4–2	3–3	1–2		1–1	3–2	2–0	1–3	1–2
KV	3–1	0–1	0–1	2–1	1–4	0–2	3–3		0–3	0–3	0–3	1–1
Reynir S.	2–2	4–10	6–1	2–3	2–1	2–0	2–2	3–1		3–2	0–2	1–2
Víðir	1–3	1–2	3–1	0–0	3–1	5–1	0–2	4–3	0–2		1–2	4–2
Víkingur Ólafsvík	5–0	1–1	1–0	3–1	3–2	4–1	4–0	2–1	4–4	3–1		2–0
Völsungur	5–1	2–1	4–3	1–0	1–3	2–0	3–1	1–0	1–0	2–1	2–2	

Updated to match(es) played on 18 September 2010. Source: ksi.is (in Icelandic)
Legend: Blue = home team win; Yellow = draw; Red = away team win.

== Top scorers ==
Scorer	Goals	Team
(Iceland) Andri Rúnar Bjarnason	19	BÍ/Bolungarvík
(Iceland) Þorsteinn Már Ragnarsson	18	Víkingur Ó.
(Iceland) Stefán Þór Eyjólfsson	15	Höttur
(Iceland) Axel Ingi Magnússon	12	Hamar
(Iceland) Þórður Birgisson	11	KS/Leiftur
(Iceland) Jóhann Magni Jóhannsson	11	Reynir S.
(Iceland) Jónmundur Grétarsson	10	BÍ/Bolungarvík
(Latvia) Aleksandrs Čekulajevs	10	Víkingur Ó.
(Serbia) Milan Lazarević	10	KS/Leiftur
(Bosnia and Herzegovina) Mirnes Smajlović	9	Hvöt
(Iceland) Björn Bergmann Vilhjálmsson	9	Víðir
