= 1990 1. deild karla =

Icelandic football league season

The 1990 season of 1. deild karla was the 36th season of second-tier football in Iceland.

== League table ==
Pos	Team	Pld	W	D	L	GF	GA	GD	Pts	Promotion or relegation
1	Víðir (C, P)	18	12	5	1	40	20	+20	41	Promoted to 1991 Úrvalsdeild
2	Breiðablik (P)	18	9	5	4	25	15	+10	32	Promoted to 1991 Úrvalsdeild
3	Fylkir	18	9	3	6	34	21	+13	30	
4	ÍR	18	8	2	8	23	24	−1	26	
5	Keflavík	18	7	4	7	19	21	−2	25	
6	Selfoss	18	7	3	8	34	33	+1	24	
7	Tindastóll	18	5	5	8	20	28	−8	20	
8	Grindavík	18	6	2	10	20	31	−11	20	
9	Leiftur (R)	18	5	4	9	19	28	−9	19	Relegated to 1991 2. deild
10	KS (R)	18	5	1	12	21	34	−13	16	Relegated to 1991 2. deild

Rules for classification: 1) points; 2) goal difference; 3) number of goals scored.
(C) Champions; (P) Promoted; (R) Relegated

== Top scorers ==
Scorer	Goals	Team
(Iceland) Grétar Einarsson	14	Víðir
(Iceland) Kristinn Tómasson	12	Fylkir
(Socialist Federal Republic of Yugoslavia) Salih Porca	12	Selfoss
(Iceland) Þorlákur Árnason	9	Leiftur
(Iceland) Grétar Steindórsson	9	Breiðablik
(Iceland) Guðbrandur Guðbrandsson	9	Tindastóll
(Socialist Federal Republic of Yugoslavia) Izudin Dervic	9	Selfoss
(Iceland) Hafþór Kolbeinsson	9	KS
