= 1995 1. deild karla =

Icelandic football league season

The 1995 season of 1. deild karla was the 41st season of second-tier football in Iceland.

== League table ==
Pos	Team	Pld	W	D	L	GF	GA	GD	Pts	Promotion or relegation
1	Fylkir (C, P)	18	14	2	2	49	21	+28	44	Promoted to 1996 Úrvalsdeild
2	Stjarnan (P)	18	11	4	3	41	21	+20	37	Promoted to 1996 Úrvalsdeild
3	KA	18	7	6	5	26	25	+1	27	
4	Þór A.	18	8	3	7	28	29	−1	27	
5	Skallagrímur	18	6	6	6	22	23	−1	24	
6	Þróttur R.	18	6	4	8	31	31	0	22	
7	Víkingur R.	18	4	6	8	27	37	−10	18	
8	ÍR	18	5	3	10	23	35	−12	18	
9	HK (R)	18	4	5	9	33	37	−4	17	Relegated to 1996 2. deild
10	Víðir (R)	18	4	3	11	14	35	−21	15	Relegated to 1996 2. deild

Rules for classification: 1) points; 2) goal difference; 3) number of goals scored.
(C) Champions; (P) Promoted; (R) Relegated

== Top scorers ==
Scorer	Goals	Team
(Iceland) Kristinn Tómasson	15	Fylkir
(Iceland) Þórhallur Dan Jóhannsson	15	Fylkir
(Iceland) Guðmundur Steinsson	11	Stjarnan
(Iceland) Guðjón Þorvarðarson	10	ÍR
(Iceland) Hjörtur Hjartarson	10	Skallagrímur
(Iceland) Marteinn Guðgeirsson	10	Víkingur R.
