= 1980 1. deild karla =

Icelandic football league season

The 1980 season of 1. deild karla was the 26th season of second-tier football in Iceland.

== League table ==
Pos	Team	Pld	W	D	L	GF	GA	GD	Pts	Promotion or relegation
1	KA (C, P)	18	15	1	2	61	15	+46	31	Promoted to 1981 Úrvalsdeild
2	Þór A. (P)	18	10	4	4	33	19	+14	24	Promoted to 1981 Úrvalsdeild
3	Þróttur N.	18	7	7	4	24	24	0	21	
4	ÍBÍ	18	4	9	5	34	35	−1	17	
5	Selfoss	18	6	5	7	31	37	−6	17	
6	Fylkir	18	6	4	8	31	25	+6	16	
7	Haukar	18	5	6	7	29	40	−11	16	
8	Völsungur	18	5	5	8	22	31	−9	15	
9	Ármann (R)	18	3	8	7	28	37	−9	14	Relegated to 1981 2. deild
10	Austri (R)	18	1	7	10	18	48	−30	9	Relegated to 1981 2. deild

Rules for classification: 1) points; 2) goal difference; 3) number of goals scored.
(C) Champions; (P) Promoted; (R) Relegated

== Top scorers ==
Scorer	Goals	Team
(Iceland) Óskar Ingimarsson	19	KA
(Iceland) Hilmar Sighvatsson	14	Fylkir
(Iceland) Ámundi Sigmundsson	12	Selfoss
(Iceland) Gunnar Gíslason	12	KA
(Iceland) Óskar Gunnarsson	11	Þór A.
