= 2019 1. deild karla =

1. deild karla
- Season: 2019
- Champions: Grótta
- Promoted: Grótta; Fjölnir
- Relegated: Haukar; Njarðvík
- Matches played: 132
- Goals scored: 401 (3.04 per match)
- Top goalscorer: 15 goals Helgi Guðjónsson, Fram; Pétur Theódór Árnason, Grótta
- All statistics correct as of 21 September 2019.

The 2019 1. deild karla (English: Men's First Division) was the 65th season of second-tier Icelandic football. Twelve teams contested the league. The season began on 4 May and concluded on 21 September.

== Teams ==
The league was contested by twelve clubs. Eight remained in the division from the 2018 season, while four new clubs joined the 1. deild karla:

- Fjölnir and Keflavík were relegated from the 2018 Úrvalsdeild, replacing ÍA and HK who were promoted to the 2019 Úrvalsdeild.
- Afturelding and Grótta were promoted from the 2018 2. deild karla, in place of ÍR and Selfoss who were relegated to the 2019 2. deild karla.

=== Club information ===
Location of teams in the 2019 1. deild karla

Team	Location
Afturelding	Mosfellsbær
Fjölnir	Reykjavík
Fram	Reykjavík
Grótta	Seltjarnarnes
Haukar	Hafnarfjörður
Keflavík	Keflavík
Leiknir R.	Reykjavík
Magni	Grenivík
Njarðvík	Njarðvík
Víkingur Ó.	Ólafsvík
Þór	Akureyri
Þróttur R.	Reykjavík

== League table ==
Pos	Team	Pld	W	D	L	GF	GA	GD	Pts	Promotion or relegation
1	Grótta (C, P)	22	12	7	3	45	31	+14	43	Promotion to 2020 Úrvalsdeild
2	Fjölnir (P)	22	12	6	4	49	22	+27	42	Promotion to 2020 Úrvalsdeild
3	Leiknir R.	22	12	4	6	37	28	+9	40	
4	Víkingur Ó.	22	9	7	6	28	20	+8	34	
5	Keflavík	22	10	4	8	31	27	+4	34	
6	Þór	22	9	7	6	31	30	+1	34	
7	Fram	22	10	3	9	33	32	+1	33	
8	Afturelding	22	6	5	11	30	37	−7	23	
9	Magni	22	6	5	11	27	49	−22	23	
10	Þróttur R.	22	6	4	12	36	40	−4	22	
11	Haukar (R)	22	5	7	10	31	41	−10	22	Relegation to 2020 2. deild karla
12	Njarðvík (R)	22	4	3	15	23	44	−21	15	Relegation to 2020 2. deild karla

Updated to match(es) played on 21 September 2019. Source: ksí.is
Rules for classification: 1) Points won; 2) Total goal difference; 3) Total goals scored; 4) Points in head-to-head matches; 5) Goal difference in h-t-h matches; 6) Goals scored in h-t-h matches; 7) Away goals in h-t-h matches; 8) Draw.
(C) Champions; (P) Promoted; (R) Relegated

== Top goalscorers ==
As of matches played on 21 September 2019

Rank	Player	Club	Goals
1	(Iceland) Pétur Theódór Árnason	Grótta	15
1	(Iceland) Helgi Guðjónsson	Fram	15
3	(Portugal) Rafael Victor	Þróttur R.	12
4	(England) Harley Willard	Víkingur Ó.	11
5	(Spain) Álvaro Montejo	Þór	10
