= 1992 1. deild karla =

Icelandic football league season

The 1992 season of 1. deild karla was the 38th season of second-tier football in Iceland.

== League table ==
| Pos | Team | Pld | W | D | L | GF | GA | GD | Pts | Promotion or relegation |
|---|---|---|---|---|---|---|---|---|---|---|
| 1 | Fylkir (C, P) | 18 | 14 | 1 | 3 | 47 | 19 | +28 | 43 | Promoted to 1993 Úrvalsdeild |
| 2 | Keflavík (P) | 18 | 12 | 4 | 2 | 42 | 16 | +26 | 40 | Promoted to 1993 Úrvalsdeild |
| 3 | Grindavík | 18 | 9 | 2 | 7 | 35 | 31 | +4 | 29 | |
| 4 | Leiftur | 18 | 8 | 4 | 6 | 38 | 23 | +15 | 28 | |
| 5 | Þróttur R. | 18 | 8 | 1 | 9 | 31 | 36 | −5 | 25 | |
| 6 | Stjarnan | 18 | 6 | 6 | 6 | 29 | 26 | +3 | 24 | |
| 7 | BÍ | 18 | 5 | 6 | 7 | 26 | 36 | −10 | 21 | |
| 8 | ÍR | 18 | 4 | 6 | 8 | 23 | 33 | −10 | 18 | |
| 9 | Víðir (R) | 18 | 3 | 6 | 9 | 20 | 30 | −10 | 15 | Relegated to 1993 2. deild |
| 10 | Selfoss (R) | 18 | 1 | 4 | 13 | 20 | 61 | −41 | 7 | Relegated to 1993 2. deild |

Rules for classification: 1) points; 2) goal difference; 3) number of goals scored.
(C) Champions; (P) Promoted; (R) Relegated

== Top scorers ==
| Scorer | Goals | Team |
|---|---|---|
| (Iceland) Óli Þór Magnússon | 18 | Keflavík |
| (Iceland) Þorlákur Árnason | 17 | Leiftur |
| (Iceland) Kjartan Einarsson | 15 | Keflavík |
| (Iceland) Indriði Einarsson | 13 | Fylkir |
| (Iceland) Kristinn Tómasson | 13 | Fylkir |
| (Iceland) Þórður Birgir Bogason | 10 | Grindavík |
| (Iceland) Hlynur Jóhannsson | 9 | Víðir |
