= 1991 1. deild karla =

Icelandic football league season

The 1991 season of 1. deild karla was the 37th season of second-tier football in Iceland.

== League table ==
Pos	Team	Pld	W	D	L	GF	GA	GD	Pts	Promotion or relegation
1	ÍA (C, P)	18	14	1	3	55	12	+43	43	Promoted to 1992 Úrvalsdeild
2	Þór A. (P)	18	11	2	5	38	22	+16	35	Promoted to 1992 Úrvalsdeild
3	Keflavík	18	10	4	4	47	22	+25	34	
4	Grindavík	18	10	3	5	28	17	+11	33	
5	Þróttur R.	18	9	3	6	33	25	+8	30	
6	Fylkir	18	7	6	5	31	22	+9	27	
7	ÍR	18	8	2	8	43	35	+8	26	
8	Selfoss	18	5	2	11	23	38	−15	17	
9	Haukar (R)	18	2	2	14	16	67	−51	8	Relegated to 1992 2. deild
10	Tindastóll (R)	18	1	1	16	18	72	−54	4	Relegated to 1992 2. deild

Rules for classification: 1) points; 2) goal difference; 3) number of goals scored.
(C) Champions; (P) Promoted; (R) Relegated

== Top scorers ==
Scorer	Goals	Team
(Iceland) Arnar Gunnlaugsson	18	ÍA
(Iceland) Tryggvi Gunnarsson	14	ÍR
(Iceland) Kjartan Einarsson	12	Keflavík
(Socialist Federal Republic of Yugoslavia) Goran Micic	11	Þróttur R.
(Iceland) Þórður Guðjónsson	11	ÍA
(Iceland) Halldór Áskelsson	11	Þór A.
(Iceland) Einar Þór Daníelsson	10	Grindavík
(Iceland) Júlíus Þór Tryggvason	10	Þór A.
