= 1981 Úrvalsdeild =

Úrvalsdeild
- Season: 1981

Statistics of Úrvalsdeild in the 1981 season.

== Overview ==
It was contested by 10 teams, and Víkingur won the championship. Víkingur's Lárus Guðmundsson and ÍBV's Sigurlás Þorleifsson were the joint top scorers with 12 goals.

== Final league table ==
Pos	Team	Pld	W	D	L	GF	GA	GD	Pts	Qualification
1	Víkingur (C)	18	11	3	4	30	23	+7	25	Qualification for the European Cup first round
2	Fram	18	7	9	2	24	17	+7	23	Qualification for the UEFA Cup first round
3	ÍA	18	8	6	4	29	17	+12	22	
4	Breiðablik	18	7	8	3	27	20	+7	22	
5	Valur	18	8	4	6	30	24	+6	20	
6	ÍBV	18	8	3	7	29	21	+8	19	Qualification for the Cup Winners' Cup first round
7	KA	18	7	4	7	22	18	+4	18	
8	KR	18	3	6	9	13	25	−12	12	
9	Þór (R)	18	3	6	9	18	35	−17	12	Relegation to 1. deild karla
10	FH (R)	18	2	3	13	20	42	−22	7	Relegation to 1. deild karla

Source: RSSSF
Rules for classification: 1) points; 2) goal difference; 3) number of goals scored.
(C) Champions; (R) Relegated

== Results ==
Each team played every opponent once home and away for a total of 18 matches.

Home \ Away	BRE	FH	FRA	ÍA	ÍBV	KA	KR	VAL	VÍK	ÞÓR
Breiðablik		0–0	1–1	0–0	1–0	3–0	1–2	5–1	1–0	3–3
FH	1–2		5–1	0–4	2–2	2–3	1–1	2–3	0–2	0–3
Fram	3–1	3–1		1–1	1–1	2–0	2–0	1–1	0–0	0–1
ÍA	3–3	3–1	0–0		3–0	0–1	0–0	0–4	0–1	3–1
FH	1–2	4–1	3–3	1–2		1–0	1–1	1–0	1–2	4–1
KA	3–0	5–1	0–1	0–1	1–0		1–1	3–0	1–2	1–1
KR	1–3	2–0	0–0	2–1	1–3	0–1		0–2	1–2	0–0
Valur	0–0	2–1	0–0	0–2	0–2	0–0	3–0		4–2	6–1
Víkingur	0–0	2–1	1–3	2–6	1–0	2–1	2–0	3–2		3–0
Þór	1–1	0–1	1–2	0–0	1–4	1–1	2–1	1–2	0–3	

Source: RSSSF
Legend: Blue = home team win; Yellow = draw; Red = away team win.
