= 1997 Úrvalsdeild =

Úrvalsdeild
- Season: 1997

Statistics of Úrvalsdeild in the 1997 season.

== Overview ==
It was contested by 10 teams, and ÍBV won the championship. ÍBV's Tryggvi Guðmundsson was the top scorer with 19 goals.

== Final league table ==
Pos	Team	Pld	W	D	L	GF	GA	GD	Pts	Qualification or relegation
1	ÍBV (C)	18	12	4	2	44	17	+27	40	Qualification for the Champions League first qualifying round
2	ÍA	18	11	2	5	42	24	+18	35	Qualification for the UEFA Cup first qualifying round
3	Leiftur	18	8	6	4	27	17	+10	30	Qualification for the Intertoto Cup first round
4	Fram	18	8	5	5	29	23	+6	29	
5	KR	18	7	6	5	38	23	+15	27	
6	Keflavík	18	7	3	8	21	28	−7	24	Qualification for the Cup Winners' Cup qualifying round
7	Grindavík	18	6	4	8	21	29	−8	22	
8	Valur	18	6	3	9	21	36	−15	21	
9	Skallagrímur (R)	18	4	3	11	19	40	−21	15	Relegation to 1. deild karla
10	Stjarnan (R)	18	1	4	13	14	39	−25	7	Relegation to 1. deild karla

Source: RSSSF
Rules for classification: 1) points; 2) goal difference; 3) number of goals scored.
(C) Champions; (R) Relegated

== Results ==
Each team played every opponent once home and away for a total of 18 matches.

Home \ Away	FRA	GRI	ÍA	ÍBV	ÍBK	KR	LEI	SKA	STJ	VAL
Fram		2–2	1–2	1–1	3–1	1–1	1–1	1–0	1–0	2–0
Grindavík	2–1		0–4	0–2	2–0	1–1	1–2	1–1	2–1	3–1
ÍA	3–2	3–1		1–3	3–0	4–2	0–0	6–0	6–2	3–2
ÍBV	1–1	2–1	3–1		5–1	1–2	3–2	3–1	5–0	3–0
Keflavík	1–0	2–0	1–1	1–1		1–1	0–1	2–3	2–1	2–0
KR	4–2	0–1	4–0	2–3	1–2		0–0	4–0	0–0	6–1
Leiftur	0–1	4–1	1–0	3–1	3–0	1–1		1–0	2–2	1–1
Skallagrímur	2–4	3–2	0–1	0–3	0–1	2–6	3–0		1–1	0–2
Stjarnan	2–3	0–1	0–3	0–0	1–3	0–2	2–0	1–2		1–3
Valur	0–2	0–0	2–1	0–4	2–1	3–1	0–5	1–1	3–0	

Source: RSSSF
Legend: Blue = home team win; Yellow = draw; Red = away team win.

== Top goalscorers ==
Rank	Player	Club	Goals
1	(Iceland) Tryggvi Guðmundsson	ÍBV	19
2	(Iceland) Andri Sigþórsson	KR	14
3	(Iceland) Þorvaldur M. Sigbjörnsson	Leiftur	8
3	(Iceland) Steingrímur Jóhannesson	ÍBV	8
5	(Iceland) Rikhardur Dadason	KR	7
5	(Iceland) Haraldur Ingólfsson	ÍA	7
5	(Iceland) Kári Steinn Reynisson	ÍA	7
5	(Iceland) Sverrir Sverrisson	ÍBV	7
5	(Iceland) Einar Daníelsson	KR	7

Source: RSSSF
