= 2008 1. deild karla =

2008 football season in Iceland

1. deild karla
- Season: 2008
- Matches played: 132

The 2008 season of 1. deild karla was the 54th season of second-tier football in Iceland.

== League table ==
| Pos | Team | Pld | W | D | L | GF | GA | GD | Pts | Promotion or relegation |
|---|---|---|---|---|---|---|---|---|---|---|
| 1 | ÍBV (C, P) | 22 | 16 | 2 | 4 | 43 | 17 | +26 | 50 | Promoted to 2009 Úrvalsdeild |
| 2 | Stjarnan (P) | 22 | 14 | 5 | 3 | 47 | 22 | +25 | 47 | Promoted to 2009 Úrvalsdeild |
| 3 | Selfoss | 22 | 14 | 4 | 4 | 54 | 36 | +18 | 46 | |
| 4 | KA | 22 | 9 | 5 | 8 | 31 | 27 | +4 | 32 | |
| 5 | Víkingur R. | 22 | 8 | 5 | 9 | 32 | 30 | +2 | 29 | |
| 6 | Haukar | 22 | 8 | 4 | 10 | 36 | 42 | −6 | 28 | |
| 7 | Leiknir R. | 22 | 7 | 5 | 10 | 33 | 40 | −7 | 26 | |
| 8 | Þór A. | 22 | 7 | 4 | 11 | 31 | 42 | −11 | 25 | |
| 9 | Fjarðabyggð | 22 | 5 | 9 | 8 | 31 | 37 | −6 | 24 | |
| 10 | Víkingur Ó. | 22 | 5 | 9 | 8 | 19 | 29 | −10 | 24 | |
| 11 | Njarðvík (R) | 22 | 4 | 7 | 11 | 26 | 42 | −16 | 19 | Relegated to 2009 2. deild |
| 12 | KS/Leiftur (R) | 22 | 1 | 9 | 12 | 17 | 36 | −19 | 12 | Relegated to 2009 2. deild |

Source: rsssf.com
Rules for classification: 1) points; 2) goal difference; 3) number of goals scored.
(C) Champions; (P) Promoted; (R) Relegated

== Top scorers ==
| Scorer | Goals | Team |
|---|---|---|
| (Iceland) Sævar Þór Gíslason | 17 | Selfoss |
| (Iceland) Atli Heimisson | 14 | ÍBV |
| (Iceland) Sveinbjörn Jónasson | 13 | Fjarðabyggð |
| (Iceland) Henning Eyþór Jónasson | 12 | Selfoss |
| (Iceland) Þorvaldur Árnason | 12 | Selfoss |
| (Denmark) Jakob Spangsberg Jensen | 11 | Leiknir R. |
| (Iceland) Ellert Hreinsson | 10 | Stjarnan |
| (Slovenia) Denis Curic | 9 | Haukar |
| (Iceland) Viðar Örn Kjartansson | 8 | Selfoss |
| (Iceland) Hreinn Hringsson | 7 | Þór A. |
