= Andri Marteinsson =

Icelandic footballer

Personal information
- Full name: Andri Marteinsson
- Date of birth: 31 January 1965 (age 61)
- Place of birth: Iceland
- Position: Midfielder

Senior career*
Years	Team	Apps	(Gls)
1983–1986	Víkingur Reykjavík	64	(25)
1987	KR	18	(1)
1988–1989	Víkingur Reykjavík	32	(6)
1990–1994	FH	86	(22)
1994	Lyn	4	(0)
1995	Fjölnir	4	(1)
1995	Þór	13	(1)
1996	Fylkir	17	(2)
1997–1998	Leiftur	32	(0)
1999	FH	13	(0)
2000	Breiðablik	14	(1)

International career
1983	Iceland U19	4	(2)
1985	Iceland U21	8	(0)
1984–1994	Iceland	20	(1)

Managerial career
- 2007–2010: Haukar
- 2011: Víkingur Reykjavík
- 2012: ÍR
- * Club domestic league appearances and goals

Andri Marteinsson (born 31 January 1965) is an Icelandic former footballer who played as a midfielder. He won 20 caps for the Iceland national football team between 1984 and 1994.

Andri was most recently the manager of 1. deild karla side ÍR, having also previously coached Haukar and Víkingur Reykjavík.

== Career statistics ==
=== International ===
Appearances and goals by national team and year
National team	Year	Apps	Goals
Iceland	1984	2	0
Iceland	1985	–	
Iceland	1986	–	
Iceland	1987	–	
Iceland	1988	–	
Iceland	1989	–	
Iceland	1990	1	0
Iceland	1991	4	1
Iceland	1992	7	0
Iceland	1993	4	0
Iceland	1994	2	0
Total		20	1

Scores and results list Iceland's goal tally first, score column indicates score after each Marteinsson goal.

List of international goals scored by Andri Marteinsson
No.	Date	Venue	Opponent	Score	Result	Competition
1	7 May 1991	Ta' Qali National Stadium, Ta' Qali, Malta	Malta	4–1	4–1	Friendly
