= Sigurlás Þorleifsson =

Icelandic footballer

Personal information
- Date of birth: 15 July 1957
- Place of birth: Iceland
- Date of death: 24 April 2018 (aged 60)
- Place of death: Heimaey, Iceland

Senior career*
Years	Team	Apps	(Gls)
1979	Knattspyrnufélagið Víkingur		
1980–1982 (?)	Íþróttabandalag Vestmannaeyja		

International career
1979–1982	Iceland	10	(2)
- * Club domestic league appearances and goals

Sigurlás Þorleifsson (15 July 1957 – 24 April 2018) was an Icelandic footballer. He was part of the Iceland national football team between 1979 and 1982. He played 10 matches, scoring 2 goals. With Knattspyrnufélagið Víkingur he was topscorer of the 1979 Úrvalsdeild with twelve goals. Later with his club Íþróttabandalag Vestmannaeyja he was again topscorer at the 1981 Úrvalsdeild (12 goals) and 1982 Úrvalsdeild (10 goals). With Íþróttabandalag Vestmannaeyja he also competed in the 1980–81 European Cup, scoring 1 goal against Baník Ostrava.

== Death ==
Sigurlás collapsed while on a hike with friends on Heimaklettur in Heimaey on 24 April 2018. Resuscitations were unsuccessful and he was pronounced dead at Vestmannaeyjar hospital later that day.

== See also ==
- List of Iceland international footballers
- Úrvalsdeild
