= David Toro (footballer) =

Spanish footballer (born 1997)

Personal information
- Full name: David del Toro Jiménez
- Date of birth: 28 May 1997 (age 29)
- Place of birth: La Algaba, Spain
- Height: 1.76 m (5 ft 9 in)
- Position: Forward

Team information
- Current team: Víðir

Youth career
- Betis

Senior career*
Years	Team	Apps	(Gls)
2016	Betis B	0	(0)
2016	→ Cabecense (loan)	12	(1)
2016–2017	Gerena	21	(9)
2017–2018	Cádiz B	47	(15)
2017–2020	Cádiz	1	(0)
2018	→ Barakaldo (loan)	1	(0)
2019–2020	→ Atlético Sanluqueño (loan)	18	(2)
2020	→ San Fernando (loan)	4	(0)
2020–2021	San Roque Lepe	7	(1)
2021	Antoniano	9	(0)
2022	Atlético Central		
2022–2023	Piano Lente		
2023	Tindastóll	13	(8)
2023–2024	Algabeño		
2024	Víðir	21	(11)
2024–2025	Algabeño		
2025–	Víðir	13	(1)
- * Club domestic league appearances and goals as of 25 July 2025

David del Toro Jiménez (born 28 May 1997), known as David Toro, is a Spanish footballer who plays for Icelandic club Víðir as a forward.

== Club career ==
Born in La Algaba, Seville, Andalusia, Toro represented Real Betis as a youth. On 28 January 2016, he was loaned to Tercera División side CD Cabecense until June, and made his senior debut three days later in a 2–1 home win against Conil CF.

Toro scored his first senior goal on 14 February 2016, netting the equalizer in a 2–1 home success over UB Lebrijana. In August, he joined fellow league team CD Gerena.

On 31 January 2017, Toro signed a two-and-a-half-year deal with Cádiz CF, being initially assigned to the reserves. He made his first team debut on 17 September, coming on as a late substitute for Aitor García in a 0–1 away loss against Real Oviedo in the Segunda División championship.

On 31 August 2018, Toro was loaned to Segunda División B side Barakaldo CF for the season. After playing only two games for the club, the parties decided to terminate the loan deal on 2 November, and he returned to Cádiz. On 17 January 2019, Toro was loaned out to Atlético Sanluqueño CF until the end of the season.
