= 1994 1. deild karla =

Icelandic football league season

The 1994 season of 1. deild karla was the 40th season of second-tier football in Iceland.

== League table ==
Pos	Team	Pld	W	D	L	GF	GA	GD	Pts	Promotion or relegation
1	Grindavík (C, P)	18	12	3	3	35	10	+25	39	Promoted to 1995 Úrvalsdeild
2	Leiftur (P)	18	10	6	2	42	19	+23	36	Promoted to 1995 Úrvalsdeild
3	Fylkir	18	11	2	5	49	25	+24	35	
4	Þróttur R.	18	8	4	6	29	20	+9	28	
5	Víkingur R.	18	8	3	7	32	31	+1	27	
6	HK	18	5	4	9	20	30	−10	19	
7	ÍR	18	5	4	9	22	38	−16	19	
8	KA	18	5	3	10	26	34	−8	18	
9	Selfoss (R)	18	4	6	8	18	43	−25	18	Relegated to 1995 2. deild
10	Þróttur N. (R)	18	2	5	11	18	41	−23	11	Relegated to 1995 2. deild

Rules for classification: 1) points; 2) goal difference; 3) number of goals scored.
(C) Champions; (P) Promoted; (R) Relegated

== Top scorers ==
Scorer	Goals	Team
(Iceland) Kristinn Tómasson	14	Fylkir
(Iceland) Gunnar Már Másson	13	Leiftur
(Iceland) Grétar Einarsson	11	Grindavík
(Iceland) Óskar Óskarsson	10	Víkingur R.
(Iceland) Aðalsteinn Víglundsson	9	Fylkir
(Iceland) Pétur Björn Jónsson	9	Leiftur
(Iceland) Páll Guðmundsson	8	Leiftur
(Iceland) Sverrir Sverrisson	8	Leiftur
