= 2007 1. deild karla =

Icelandic football league season

The 2007 season of 1. deild karla was the 53rd season of second-tier football in Iceland.

== League table ==
Pos	Team	Pld	W	D	L	GF	GA	GD	Pts	Promotion or relegation
1	Grindavík (C, P)	22	15	2	5	47	21	+26	47	Promoted to 2008 Úrvalsdeild (Note: Due to the Úrvalsdeild expanding to 12 teams, 3 teams were promoted and only 1 relegated from 1. deild karla in order to keep 12 teams in the league.)
2	Þróttur R. (P)	22	14	5	3	47	24	+23	47	Promoted to 2008 Úrvalsdeild
3	Fjölnir (P)	22	14	3	5	61	29	+32	45	Promoted to 2008 Úrvalsdeild
4	ÍBV	22	13	5	4	42	23	+19	44	
5	Fjarðabyggð	22	11	4	7	23	17	+6	37	
6	Leiknir R.	22	6	7	9	22	27	−5	25	
7	Þór A.	22	6	6	10	33	40	−7	24	
8	Njarðvík	22	5	8	9	25	32	−7	23	
9	Stjarnan	22	5	5	12	39	44	−5	20	
10	Víkingur Ó.	22	5	5	12	22	33	−11	20	
11	KA	22	5	4	13	14	45	−31	19	
12	Reynir S. (R)	22	3	7	12	22	62	−40	16	Relegated to 2008 2. deild

Source: rsssf.com
Rules for classification: 1) points; 2) goal difference; 3) number of goals scored.
(C) Champions; (P) Promoted; (R) Relegated

== Top scorers ==
Scorer	Goals	Team
(Iceland) Hjörtur Hjartarson	18	Þróttur R.
(Iceland) Atli Viðar Björnsson	14	Fjölnir
(Iceland) Gunnar Már Guðmundsson	12	Fjölnir
(Iceland) Guðjón Baldvinsson	12	Stjarnan
(Iceland) Hreinn Hringsson	11	Þór A.
(Denmark) Jakob Spangsberg Jensen	10	Leiknir R.
(Iceland) Adolf Sveinsson	10	Þróttur R.
(Iceland) Tómas Leifsson	9	Fjölnir
(Scotland) Paul McShane	9	Grindavík
(England) Ian David Jeffs	9	ÍBV
(Iceland) Andri Steinn Birgisson	8	Grindavík
(Scotland) Scott Ramsey	8	Grindavík
(Iceland) Atli Heimisson	8	ÍBV
