= 2009 1. deild karla =

2009 football season in Iceland

1. deild karla
- Season: 2009
- Matches played: 132
- Goals scored: 413 (3.13 per match)

The 2009 season of 1. deild karla was the 55th season of second-tier football in Iceland.

== League table ==
Pos	Team	Pld	W	D	L	GF	GA	GD	Pts	Promotion or relegation
1	Selfoss (C, P)	22	15	2	5	53	26	+27	47	Promoted to 2010 Úrvalsdeild
2	Haukar (P)	22	13	5	4	44	28	+16	44	Promoted to 2010 Úrvalsdeild
3	HK	22	11	3	8	36	28	+8	36	
4	Fjarðabyggð	22	11	3	8	32	33	−1	36	
5	KA	22	10	5	7	32	24	+8	35	
6	Þór A.	22	10	1	11	33	35	−2	31	
7	Leiknir R.	22	7	8	7	32	33	−1	29	
8	ÍR	22	9	2	11	40	46	−6	29	
9	ÍA	22	7	7	8	26	27	−1	28	
10	Víkingur R.	22	7	5	10	36	34	+2	26	
11	Afturelding (R)	22	3	7	12	25	45	−20	16	Relegated to 2010 2. deild
12	Víkingur Ó. (R)	22	3	4	15	24	54	−30	13	Relegated to 2010 2. deild

Source: rsssf.com
Rules for classification: 1) points; 2) goal difference; 3) number of goals scored.
(C) Champions; (P) Promoted; (R) Relegated

== Top scorers ==
Scorer	Goals	Team
(Iceland) Sævar Þór Gíslason	19	Selfoss
(Iceland) Árni Freyr Guðnason	16	ÍR
(Hungary) David Disztl	15	KA
(Iceland) Einar Sigþórsson	10	Þór A.
(Denmark) Jakob Spangsberg Jensen	10	Víkingur R.
(Iceland) Jóhann Ragnar Benediktsson	10	Fjarðabyggð
(Iceland) Garðar Ingvar Geirsson	10	Haukar
(Iceland) Andri Júlíusson	8	ÍA
(Iceland) Ólafur Hrannar Kristjánsson	8	Leiknir R.
(Iceland) Hjörtur Júlíus Hjartarson	7	Selfoss
(Iceland) Albert Ásvaldsson	7	Afturelding
(Iceland) Hreinn Hringsson	7	Þór A.
