= 1993 1. deild karla =

Icelandic football league season

The 1993 season of 1. deild karla was the 39th season of second-tier football in Iceland.

== League table ==
Pos	Team	Pld	W	D	L	GF	GA	GD	Pts	Promotion or relegation
1	Breiðablik (C, P)	18	12	2	4	36	14	+22	38	Promoted to 1994 Úrvalsdeild
2	Stjarnan (P)	18	11	4	3	39	19	+20	37	Promoted to 1994 Úrvalsdeild
3	Leiftur	18	11	3	4	33	25	+8	36	
4	KA	18	9	2	7	31	22	+9	29	
5	Grindavík	18	7	6	5	29	21	+8	27	
6	Þróttur R.	18	8	3	7	31	26	+5	27	
7	Þróttur N.	18	5	2	11	24	45	−21	17	
8	ÍR	18	4	4	10	20	34	−14	16	
9	BÍ (R)	18	4	3	11	20	37	−17	15	Relegated to 1994 2. deild
10	Tindastóll (R)	18	3	3	12	20	40	−20	12	Relegated to 1994 2. deild

Rules for classification: 1) points; 2) goal difference; 3) number of goals scored.
(C) Champions; (P) Promoted; (R) Relegated

== Top scorers ==
Scorer	Goals	Team
(Iceland) Ingvar Ólason	10	Þróttur R.
(Iceland) Pétur Björn Jónsson	10	Leiftur
(Iceland) Leifur Geir Hafsteinsson	10	Stjarnan
(Iceland) Þórarinn Ólafsson	9	Grindavík
(Iceland) Gunnar Már Másson	9	Leiftur
(Iceland) Willum Þór Þórsson	9	Breiðablik
