= Einar Páll Tómasson =

Icelandic footballer

Personal information
- Date of birth: 18 October 1968 (age 58)
- Position: Defender

Senior career*
Years	Team	Apps	(Gls)
1988–1989	Valur	22	(0)
1989–1990	TuS Paderborn-Neuhaus		
1990–1992	Valur	47	(0)
1993	Degerfors	8	(0)
1993	Raufoss		
1994	Breiðablik	15	(0)
1995–1998	Raufoss		
1999	Valur	7	(0)

International career
- Iceland u-21
1990–1992	Iceland	5	(0)
- * Club domestic league appearances and goals

Einar Páll Tómasson (born 18 October 1968) is an Icelandic retired football defender.

== International career ==
He made his debut for Iceland in an August 1990 friendly match away against the Faroe Islands and earned five caps for the national team, scoring no goals. His final international match was a March 1992 friendly away against the United Arab Emirates.
