= 1979 Úrvalsdeild =

Úrvalsdeild
- Season: 1979

Statistics of Úrvalsdeild in the 1979 season.

== Overview ==
It was contested by 10 teams, and ÍBV won the championship. Víkingur's Sigurlás Þorleifsson was the top scorer with 10 goals.

== Final league table ==
Pos	Team	Pld	W	D	L	GF	GA	GD	Pts	Qualification or relegation
1	ÍBV (C)	18	10	4	4	26	13	+13	24	Qualification for the European Cup first round
2	ÍA	18	10	3	5	27	17	+10	23	
3	Valur	18	9	5	4	35	22	+13	23	Qualification for the UEFA Cup first round
4	Keflavík	18	8	6	4	26	18	+8	22	
5	KR	18	9	4	5	29	24	+5	22	
6	Fram	18	4	9	5	25	23	+2	17	Qualification for the Cup Winners' Cup first round
7	Víkingur	18	6	4	8	26	25	+1	16	
8	Þróttur	18	6	4	8	27	31	−4	16	
9	KA (R)	18	3	6	9	21	35	−14	12	Relegation to 1. deild karla
10	Haukar (R)	18	1	3	14	12	46	−34	5	Relegation to 1. deild karla

Source: rsssf.com
Rules for classification: 1) points; 2) goal difference; 3) number of goals scored.
(C) Champions; (R) Relegated

== Results ==
Each team played every opponent once home and away for a total of 18 matches.

Home \ Away	FRA	HAU	ÍA	ÍBV	KA	ÍBK	KR	VAL	VÍK	ÞRÓ
Fram		3–0	1–1	1–1	1–1	4–0	0–2	1–1	1–5	0–1
Haukar	1–1		2–1	0–1	2–2	0–0	0–1	0–3	1–3	1–5
ÍA	0–0	1–0		0–2	3–2	1–0	2–0	3–2	1–0	4–0
ÍBV	0–2	4–0	1–0		3–0	0–0	0–2	2–0	1–1	3–1
KA	1–1	3–1	2–4	1–0		0–0	1–1	1–1	3–1	0–2
Keflavík	2–1	1–1	0–0	3–1	4–1		1–0	0–3	4–0	1–1
KR	3–2	4–1	1–3	2–2	4–2	3–2		1–1	1–0	1–1
Valur	3–2	3–0	2–1	0–2	5–1	1–2	1–0		3–3	3–1
Víkingur	1–3	3–0	1–0	0–1	4–0	1–2	0–2	0–0		2–1
Þróttur	1–1	3–2	1–2	0–2	1–0	0–4	5–1	2–3	1–1	

Legend: Blue = home team win; Yellow = draw; Red = away team win.
