= 1992 Úrvalsdeild =

Úrvalsdeild
- Season: 1992

Statistics of Úrvalsdeild in the 1992 season.

== Overview ==
It was contested by 10 teams, and ÍA won the championship. ÍA's Arnar Gunnlaugsson was the top scorer with 15 goals.

== Final league table ==
Pos	Team	Pld	W	D	L	GF	GA	GD	Pts	Qualification or relegation
1	ÍA (C)	18	12	4	2	40	19	+21	40	Qualification for the Champions League preliminary round
2	KR	18	11	4	3	41	17	+24	37	Qualification for the UEFA Cup first round
3	Þór	18	10	5	3	30	14	+16	35	
4	Valur	18	9	4	5	33	27	+6	31	Qualification for the Cup Winners' Cup first round
5	Fram	18	8	1	9	25	27	−2	25	
6	FH	18	5	6	7	25	29	−4	21	
7	Víkingur	18	5	4	9	25	33	−8	19	
8	ÍBV	18	5	1	12	23	44	−21	16	
9	Breiðablik (R)	18	4	3	11	14	31	−17	15	Relegation to 1. deild karla
10	KA (R)	18	3	4	11	18	33	−15	13	Relegation to 1. deild karla

Source: RSSSF
Rules for classification: 1) points; 2) goal difference; 3) number of goals scored.
(C) Champions; (R) Relegated

== Results ==
Each team played every opponent once home and away for a total of 18 matches.

Home \ Away	BRE	FH	FRA	ÍA	ÍBV	KA	KR	VAL	VÍK	ÞÓR
Breiðablik		1–3	1–0	0–1	2–3	2–1	1–0	0–5	0–0	0–1
FH	2–1		3–0	0–4	1–2	2–2	2–2	0–0	2–2	0–0
Fram	3–0	1–0		0–2	3–1	1–0	3–1	0–2	2–1	0–2
ÍA	4–2	3–1	2–0		7–1	1–0	3–1	1–5	2–2	1–0
ÍBV	0–0	0–3	4–2	0–1		2–1	0–2	1–2	1–2	0–1
KA	1–2	3–3	1–2	1–0	1–3		1–1	1–3	1–0	0–2
KR	1–0	4–1	3–2	2–2	3–0	3–0		0–0	3–0	3–1
Valur	2–0	1–0	1–4	1–1	3–2	4–0	1–9		1–2	0–3
Víkingur	3–1	1–2	2–2	1–3	6–1	0–2	0–2	2–1		1–4
Þór	1–1	2–0	1–0	2–2	4–2	2–2	0–1	1–1	3–0	

Legend: Blue = home team win; Yellow = draw; Red = away team win.

== Top goalscorers ==
Rank	Player	Club	Goals
1	(Iceland) Arnar Gunnlaugsson	ÍA	15
2	(Iceland) Bjarni Sveinbjörnsson	Þór	11
3	(Iceland) Ragnar Margeirsson	KR	10
3	(Iceland) Anthony Karl Gregory	Valur	10
3	(Iceland) Helgi Sigurðsson	Víkingur	10
6	(Iceland) Valdimar Kristófersson	Fram	9
7	(Iceland) Andri Marteinsson	FH	8
8	(Iceland) Tómas Ingi Tómasson	ÍBV	7
8	(Iceland) Gunnar Már Másson	KA	7
8	(Iceland) Steinar Ingimundarsson	KR	7

Source: RSSSF
