= 2000 Úrvalsdeild =

Úrvalsdeild
- Season: 2000
- Dates: 16 May – 16 September 2000
- Champions: KR (22nd title)
- Relegated: Stjarnan; Leiftur
- Champions League: KR
- UEFA Cup: Fylkir
- Matches played: 90
- Goals scored: 255 (2.83 per match)
- Top goalscorer: 14 goals: Andri Sigþórsson; Guðmundur Steinarsson
- Average attendance: 899

The 2000 season of Úrvalsdeild was the 89th season of league football in Iceland. KR defended their title. Stjarnan and Leiftur were relegated. The competition was known as Símadeild due to its sponsorship by Icelandic telecommunications company, Síminn.

KR's Andri Sigþórsson was the top scorer with 14 goals.

== Final league table ==
Pos	Team	Pld	W	D	L	GF	GA	GD	Pts	Qualification or relegation
1	KR (C)	18	11	4	3	27	14	+13	37	Qualification for the Champions League first qualifying round
2	Fylkir	18	10	5	3	39	16	+23	35	Qualification for the UEFA Cup qualifying round
3	Grindavík	18	8	6	4	25	18	+7	30	Qualification for the Intertoto Cup first round
4	ÍBV	18	8	5	5	29	17	+12	29	
5	ÍA	18	7	5	6	21	17	+4	26	Qualification for the UEFA Cup qualifying round
6	Keflavík	18	4	7	7	21	35	−14	19	
7	Breiðablik	18	5	3	10	29	35	−6	18	
8	Fram	18	4	5	9	22	33	−11	17	
9	Stjarnan (R)	18	4	5	9	18	31	−13	17	Relegation to 1. deild karla
10	Leiftur (R)	18	3	7	8	24	39	−15	16	Relegation to 1. deild karla

Rules for classification: 1) points; 2) goal difference; 3) number of goals scored.
(C) Champions; (R) Relegated

2000 Símadeild winners
KR
22nd title

== Results ==
Each team played every opponent once home and away for a total of 18 matches.

Home \ Away	BRE	FRA	FYL	GRI	ÍA	ÍBV	ÍBK	KR	LEI	STJ
Breiðablik		1–0	0–0	3–4	0–1	2–0	2–1	1–2	5–0	3–3
Fram	1–1		1–2	3–1	1–4	1–1	0–0	0–1	3–1	1–2
Fylkir	5–0	1–0		2–0	2–1	2–3	4–0	1–1	1–1	5–1
Grindavík	3–0	3–0	2–1		1–0	1–0	0–0	0–1	2–2	2–0
ÍA	3–1	2–2	0–1	2–1		0–0	2–2	0–2	1–0	0–0
ÍBV	4–1	6–1	2–2	1–2	1–0		5–0	1–1	0–0	2–0
Keflavík	1–0	3–3	1–1	2–2	0–2	1–2		1–0	2–5	1–0
KR	3–2	1–2	2–1	1–1	1–0	1–0	2–3		1–0	3–0
Leiftur	2–6	2–1	1–7	0–0	2–2	0–1	4–2	0–0		3–3
Stjarnan	2–1	1–2	0–1	0–0	0–1	2–0	1–1	1–4	2–1	

Legend: Blue = home team win; Yellow = draw; Red = away team win.

== Top goalscorers ==
Rank	Player	Club	Goals
1	(Iceland) Andri Sigþórsson	KR	14
1	(Iceland) Guðmundur Steinarsson	Keflavík	14
3	(Iceland) Gylfi Einarsson	Fylkir	10
4	(Iceland) Steingrímur Jóhannesson	ÍBV	9
4	(Iceland) Sævar Þór Gíslason	Fylkir	9
6	(Iceland) Sverrir Sverrisson	Fylkir	8
7	(Denmark) Ronny Petersen	Fram	6
7	(Iceland) Ólafur Örn Bjarnason	Grindavík	6
7	(Iceland) Hreiðar Bjarnason	Breiðablik	6
7	(Federal Republic of Yugoslavia) Siniša Valdimar Kekić	Grindavík	6
