= Húsavíkurvöllur =

Sports venue in Húsavík, Iceland

(Iceland) Húsavíkurvöllur
- Interactive map of (Iceland) Húsavíkurvöllur
- Location: Húsavík, Iceland
- Coordinates: 66.0507089°N 17.3462842°W
- Capacity: 2,000

Tenant
- Völsungur

Húsavíkurvöllur (Icelandic: [ˈhuːsaˌviːkʏrˌvœtlʏr̥], regionally also [-ˌviːkʰʏr-], lit. 'Húsavík Field' or more precisely 'Húsavík Stadium') is a multi-use stadium in Húsavík, Iceland. It is currently used mostly for football matches and is the home stadium of Íþróttafélagið Völsungur. Its capacity is around 2000.
