= 1993 Úrvalsdeild =

Statistics of the 1993 football season of Icelandic team Úrvalsdeild

Úrvalsdeild
- Season: 1993

Statistics of Úrvalsdeild in the 1993 season.

== Overview ==
It was contested by 10 teams, and ÍA won the championship. ÍA's Þórður Guðjónsson was the top scorer with 19 goals.

== Final league table ==
Pos	Team	Pld	W	D	L	GF	GA	GD	Pts	Qualification or relegation
1	ÍA (C)	18	16	1	1	62	16	+46	49	Qualification for the UEFA Cup preliminary round
2	FH	18	12	4	2	39	21	+18	40	Qualification for the UEFA Cup preliminary round
3	Keflavík	18	8	3	7	31	31	0	27	Qualification for the Cup Winners' Cup qualifying round
4	Fram	18	8	1	9	38	37	+1	25	
5	KR	18	7	3	8	37	34	+3	24	
6	Valur	18	6	4	8	25	24	+1	22	
7	Þór	18	5	5	8	20	30	−10	20	
8	ÍBV	18	5	4	9	31	41	−10	19	
9	Fylkir (R)	18	6	1	11	22	35	−13	19	Relegation to 1. deild karla
10	Víkingur (R)	18	3	2	13	23	59	−36	11	Relegation to 1. deild karla

Source: RSSSF
Rules for classification: 1) points; 2) goal difference; 3) number of goals scored.
(C) Champions; (R) Relegated

== Results ==
Each team played every opponent once home and away for a total of 18 matches.

Home \ Away	FH	FRA	FYL	ÍA	ÍBV	ÍBK	KR	VAL	VÍK	ÞÓR
FH		3–1	4–0	0–5	3–1	5–1	2–0	1–1	4–2	4–1
Fram	0–4		5–0	4–2	5–1	2–1	2–4	3–2	4–1	1–2
Fylkir	0–2	3–0		1–3	1–2	2–2	2–1	2–1	1–2	1–0
ÍA	5–0	3–3	4–1		3–1	2–0	1–0	1–0	10–1	6–0
ÍBV	2–2	1–2	1–0	2–5		1–2	2–4	0–2	3–2	1–1
Keflavík	0–1	2–1	2–1	1–2	4–0		1–4	1–3	3–2	5–2
KR	1–2	1–4	1–3	1–4	2–2	2–2		2–0	7–2	2–0
Valur	1–2	4–1	4–3	0–2	0–1	0–2	1–1		3–1	2–1
Víkingur	0–0	2–0	0–2	1–3	2–9	0–1	3–2	0–0		1–2
Þór	0–0	1–0	1–0	0–1	1–1	1–1	1–2	1–1	5–1	

Source: RSSSF
Legend: Blue = home team win; Yellow = draw; Red = away team win.

== Top goalscorers ==
Rank	Player	Club	Goals
1	(Iceland) Þórður Guðjónsson	ÍA	19
2	(Iceland) Oli Þór Magnusson	Keflavík	15
3	(Iceland) Haraldur Ingólfsson	ÍA	14
3	(Iceland) Helgi Sigurðsson	Fram	14
5	(Iceland) Hörður Magnússon	FH	13
5	(Federal Republic of Yugoslavia) Mihajlo Biberčić	ÍA	13
7	(Iceland) Tryggvi Guðmundsson	ÍBV	12
8	(Iceland) Anthony Karl Gregory	Valur	9
8	(Iceland) Kristinn Tómasson	Fylkir	9
