= 1995 Úrvalsdeild =

Úrvalsdeild
- Season: 1995

The 1995 Úrvalsdeild is a season of top-flight Icelandic football.

== Overview ==
It was contested by 10 teams, and ÍA won the championship. ÍA's Arnar Gunnlaugsson was the top scorer with 15 goals.

== Final league table ==
Pos	Team	Pld	W	D	L	GF	GA	GD	Pts	Qualification or relegation
1	ÍA (C)	18	16	1	1	50	15	+35	49	Qualification for the UEFA Cup preliminary round
2	KR	18	11	2	5	33	22	+11	35	Qualification for the Cup Winners' Cup qualifying round
3	ÍBV	18	10	1	7	41	29	+12	31	Qualification for the UEFA Cup preliminary round
4	Keflavík	18	6	8	4	28	29	−1	26	Qualification for the Intertoto Cup group stage
5	Leiftur	18	7	3	8	32	34	−2	24	
6	Grindavík	18	7	2	9	26	29	−3	23	
7	Valur	18	7	2	9	26	34	−8	23	
8	Breiðablik	18	5	3	10	24	31	−7	18	
9	FH (R)	18	4	3	11	26	42	−16	15	Relegation to 1. deild karla
10	Fram (R)	18	3	3	12	18	39	−21	12	Relegation to 1. deild karla

Source: rsssf.com
Rules for classification: 1) points; 2) goal difference; 3) number of goals scored.
(C) Champions; (R) Relegated

== Results ==
Each team played every opponent once home and away for a total of 18 matches.

Home \ Away	BRE	FH	FRA	GRI	ÍA	ÍBV	ÍBK	KR	LEI	VAL
Breiðablik		2–1	1–2	0–0	0–1	0–1	1–1	1–3	1–2	2–1
FH	2–4		2–1	2–0	2–3	1–3	2–2	2–2	2–2	2–3
Fram	1–0	3–0		0–2	1–2	0–0	2–4	1–4	0–4	1–3
Grindavík	6–3	2–1	2–2		1–2	1–0	1–2	1–0	3–2	1–2
ÍA	2–0	3–1	3–0	4–0		5–1	8–2	2–0	2–2	1–0
ÍBV	2–3	6–3	2–1	3–1	1–3		3–2	1–0	4–0	8–1
Keflavík	1–1	2–0	1–1	1–0	0–1	1–0		0–1	3–2	1–1
KR	2–1	0–1	3–1	2–1	3–2	4–2	3–3		2–0	1–0
Leiftur	3–1	1–2	3–1	3–1	0–2	2–1	2–2	1–2		1–4
Valur	0–3	3–0	3–0	0–3	1–4	1–3	0–0	2–1	1–2	

Legend: Blue = home team win; Yellow = draw; Red = away team win.

== Top goalscorers ==
Rank	Player	Club	Goals
1	(Iceland) Arnar Gunnlaugsson	ÍA	15
2	(Iceland) Tryggvi Guðmundsson	ÍBV	14
3	(Federal Republic of Yugoslavia) Mihajlo Biberčić	KR	13
4	(Iceland) Rastislav Lazorík	Breiðablik	11
5	(Iceland) Ólafur Þórðarson	ÍA	10
6	(Iceland) Hörður Magnússon	FH	8
7	(Iceland) Þorbjörn Sveinsson	Fram	7
7	(Iceland) Tómas Ingi Tómasson	Grindavík	7
