= Ungmennafélag Grindavíkur =

Icelandic sports club

Ungmennafélag Grindavíkur (Icelandic pronunciation: [ˈuŋkˌmɛnːaˌfjɛːˌlaːɣ ˈkrɪntaˌviːkʏr̥], lit. 'Grindavík Youth Club'), commonly known as UMFG or Grindavík, is a multi-sport club in Grindavík, Iceland. It has active departments of football, basketball, judo, swimming, taekwondo and gymnastic.

== Basketball ==
=== Men's basketball ===
The Grindavíks men's basketball team has won three national championships, the last one coming in 2013.

==== Titles ====
- Úrvalsdeild karla: 3:
  - 1995-96, 2011–12, 2012–13
- Icelandic Cup: 5:
  - 1995, 1998, 2000, 2006, 2014

=== Women's basketball ===
The Grindavíks women's basketball team won its lone national championship in 1997.

==== Titles ====
- Úrvalsdeild kvenna: 1:
  - 1996-97
- Icelandic Cup: 2:
  - 2008, 2015

== Football ==
Grindavík men's and women's teams play their home games at Grindavíkurvöllur.

=== Men's football ===
==== Trophies and achievements ====
- Icelandic League Cup: 1:
  - 2000
