= 1. deild karla (football) =

- Founded: 1997; 29 years ago 1955 (as 2. deild karla)
- Country: Iceland
- Number of clubs: 12
- Level on pyramid: 2
- Promotion to: Besta deild karla
- Relegation to: 2. deild karla
- Domestic cup(s): Bikarkeppni karla League Cup
- Current champions: Afturelding (2026)
- Most championships: Þróttur and Breiðablik (6 titles each)
- Website: KSÍ.is
- Current: 2026 1. deild karla

1. deild karla, known as Lengjudeild karla (The Lengja League) for sponsorship reasons, is an association football league in Iceland. It is the second highest professional level in the Icelandic football league system. The league was founded in 1955 and current champions are Þór. The league was expanded to 12 teams for the 2007 season, after having only 10 teams for many years. Since 2008 the top three divisions have all had 12 teams.

== Current clubs (2027) ==
Team	Location	Stadium	2026 season
Fylkir	Reykjavík (Árbær)	Floridana völlurinn	3rd
Grótta	Seltjarnarnes	Vívaldivöllurinn	8th
Haukar	Hafnarfjörður	Ásvellir	2. deild, 1st
HK	Kópavogur	Kórinn	4th
ÍBV	Vestmannaeyjar	Hásteinsvöllur	Besta deild, 12th
ÍR	Reykjavík (Breiðholt)	ÍR-völlur	7th
KA	Akureyri	Greifavöllurinn	Besta deild, 1tth
Leiknir	Reykjavík (Breiðholt)	Domusnovavöllurinn	6th
Njarðvík	Njarðvík	Rafholtsvöllurinn	5th
Selfoss	Selfoss	JÁVERK völlurinn	2. deild, 2nd
Vestri	Ísafjörður	Kerecisvöllurinn	9th
Völsungur	Húsavík	PCC völlurinn	10th

== History ==
=== Championship history ===
- 1955 ÍBA (Akureyri)
- 1956 ÍBH (Hafnarfjörður)
- 1957 Keflavík (Keflavík)
- 1958 Þróttur R. (Reykjavík)
- 1959 ÍBA (Akureyri)
- 1960 ÍBH (Hafnarfjörður)
- 1961 ÍBÍ (Ísafjörður)
- 1962 Keflavík (Keflavík)
- 1963 Þróttur R. (Reykjavík)
- 1964 ÍBA (Akureyri)
- 1965 Þróttur R. (Reykjavík)
- 1966 Fram (Reykjavík)
- 1967 ÍBV (Vestmannaeyjar)
- 1968 ÍA (Akranes)
- 1969 Víkingur R. (Reykjavík)
- 1970 Breiðablik (Kópavogur)
- 1971 Víkingur R. (Reykjavík)
- 1972 ÍBA (Akureyri)
- 1973 Víkingur R. (Reykjavík)
- 1974 FH (Hafnarfjörður)
- 1975 Breiðablik (Kópavogur)
- 1976 ÍBV (Vestmannaeyjar)
- 1977 Þróttur R. (Reykjavík)
- 1978 KR (Reykjavík)
- 1979 Breiðablik (Kópavogur)
- 1980 KA (Akureyri)
- 1981 Keflavík (Keflavík)
- 1982 Þróttur R. (Reykjavík)
- 1983 Fram (Reykjavík)
- 1984 FH (Hafnarfjörður)
- 1985 ÍBV (Vestmannaeyjar)
- 1986 Völsungur (Húsavík)
- 1987 Víkingur R. (Reykjavík)
- 1988 FH (Hafnarfjörður)
- 1989 Stjarnan (Garðabær)
- 1990 Víðir (Garður)
- 1991 ÍA (Akranes)
- 1992 Fylkir (Reykjavík)
- 1993 Breiðablik (Kópavogur)
- 1994 Grindavík (Grindavík)
- 1995 Fylkir (Reykjavík)
- 1996 Fram (Reykjavík)
- 1997 Þróttur R. (Reykjavík)
- 1998 Breiðablik (Kópavogur)
- 1999 Fylkir (Reykjavík)
- 2000 FH (Hafnarfjörður)
- 2001 Þór (Akureyri)
- 2002 Valur (Reykjavík)
- 2003 Keflavík (Reykjanesbær)
- 2004 Valur (Reykjavík)
- 2005 Breiðablik (Kópavogur)
- 2006 Fram (Reykjavík)
- 2007 Grindavík (Grindavík)
- 2008 ÍBV (Vestmannaeyjar)
- 2009 Selfoss (Selfoss)
- 2010 Víkingur R. (Reykjavík)
- 2011 ÍA (Akranes)
- 2012 Þór (Akureyri)
- 2013 Fjölnir (Reykjavík)
- 2014 Leiknir R. (Reykjavík)
- 2015 Víkingur Ó. (Ólafsvík)
- 2016 KA (Akureyri)
- 2017 Fylkir (Reykjavík)
- 2018 ÍA (Akranes)
- 2019 Grótta (Seltjarnarnes)
- 2020 Keflavík (Reykjanesbær)
- 2021 Fram (Reykjavík)
- 2022 Fylkir (Reykjavík)
- 2023 ÍA (Akranes)
- 2024 ÍBV (Vestmannaeyjar)
- 2025 Þór (Akureyri)

== Number of titles by club ==
Team	Titles	First title	Last title
Þróttur R.	6	1958	1997
Breiðablik	6	1970	2005
Keflavík	5	1957	2020
Fram	5	1966	2021
Víkingur R.	5	1969	2010
Fylkir	5	1992	2022
ÍA	5	1968	2023
ÍBV	5	1967	2024
ÍBA	4	1955	1972
FH	4	1974	2000
Þór A.	3	2001	2025
KA	2	1980	2016
Grindavík	2	1994	2007
ÍBH	2	1956	1960
Valur	2	2002	2004
ÍBÍ	1	1961	1961
KR	1	1978	1978
Völsungur	1	1986	1986
Stjarnan	1	1989	1989
Víðir	1	1990	1990
Selfoss	1	2009	2009
Fjölnir	1	2013	2013
Leiknir R.	1	2014	2014
Víkingur Ó.	1	2015	2015
Grótta	1	2019	2019
