= Ungmennafélagið Skallagrímur =

Icelandic sports club

- Full name: Ungmennafélagið Skallagrímur
- Short name: Skallagrímur
- Founded: 3 December 1916
- Based in: Borgarnes

Ungmennafélagið Skallagrímur (Icelandic pronunciation: [ˈuŋkˌmɛnːaˌfjɛːˌlaijɪð ˈskatlaˌkriːmʏr̥], lit. 'Skallagrímur Youth Club' (Note: Ungmennafélagið is the definite form of Ungmennafélag, meaning "the youth club".)), known as UMF Skallagrímur or just Skallagrímur, is a multi-sports club from Borgarnes, Iceland. It was founded on 3 December 1916. Each sport has its own division with a separate board, football, basketball, badminton, swimming, weightlifting and athletics. Unusually for a sports club, there is a non-sport division, for acting (theatre), with the club staging a play every year.

== Basketball ==
Men's basketball

Skallagrímur men's basketball is the men's basketball department of Ungmennafélagið Skallagrímur.

Women's basketball

Skallagrímur women's basketball is the women's basketball department of Ungmennafélagið Skallagrímur. It won the national championship in 1964. In 2017 it made it to the Icelandic Basketball Cup finals where it lost to Keflavík, 65–62.

== Football ==
=== Men's football ===
The men's football team won the third-tier 2. deild karla in 1983 and 1994. in 1996, the team was promoted to the top-tier Úrvalsdeild karla where it played one season before being relegated back to 1. deild karla.
