= UMF Selfoss =

Sports club in Selfoss, Iceland

- Full name: Ungmennafélag Selfoss
- Nickname: Selfyssingar
- Sport: Athletics Football; Gymnastics; Handball; Judo; Motocross; Weightlifting; Swimming Taekwondo
- Founded: 1 June 1936; 90 years ago
- Team history: UMF Tíbrá (1936-1937); UMF Selfoss (1937-present)
- Chairman: Viktor Stefán Pálsson
- Website: umfs.is

Ungmennafélag Selfoss (Icelandic pronunciation: [ˈuŋkˌmɛnːaˌfjɛːˌlaːɣ ˈsɛlˌfɔsː], lit. 'Selfoss Youth Club'), commonly known as Selfoss or UMF Selfoss, is an Icelandic multisport club, located in the town of Selfoss in the Southern Region. In May 2019, the Selfoss men's handball team won the national handball championship for the first time. In August 2019, the women's football team added the club's second major title in one year when it won the Icelandic Football Cup.

== History ==
Ungmennafélag Selfoss (English: Selfoss' Youth Club) was established on 1 June 1936, as a general sports club for young men and women under the name Ungmennafélagið Tíbrá. On 26 January 1937 its name was changed to Ungmennafélag Selfoss. Today, the club has departments for nine sports activities (gymnastics, athletics, team handball, judo, association football, weightlifting, swimming, taekwondo and motocross).

== Basketball ==
=== Men's basketball ===
==== Notable players ====
- (United States) John Johnson
- (Iceland) Marvin Valdimarsson

=== Women's basketball ===
In 2006, a joint team of Hamar and Selfoss, called Hamar/Selfoss, won the second-tier 1. deild kvenna.

==== Titles ====
- 1. deild kvenna: 2006

== Football ==
=== Men's football ===
The Selfoss men's football team has played in the top-tier Úrvalsdeild karla two times, during the 2010 and 2012 seasons, being relegated both times.

==== Titles ====
- 1. deild karla: 2009
- 2. deild karla: 1966, 1978, 1985, 1993

=== Current squad ===
As of 11 September 2023

Note: Flags indicate national team as defined under FIFA eligibility rules; some limited exceptions apply. Players may hold more than one non-FIFA nationality.

No.	Pos.	Nation	Player
1	GK	ISL	Stefán Þór Ágústsson
2	MF	ISL	Ívan Breki Sigurðsson
3	MF	ISL	Reynir Freyr Sveinsson
4	DF	ISL	Oskar Wasilewski
5	MF	ISL	Jón Vignir Pétursson
6	DF	ESP	Adrián Sánchez
7	MF	ISL	Aron Darri Auðunsson
8	MF	ISL	Ingvi Rafn Óskarsson
10	FW	ENG	Gary Martin
11	MF	UKR	Albert Gatilov
12	GK	ISL	Arnór Elí Kjartansson
14	MF	ISL	Aron Fannar Birgisson

No.	Pos.	Nation	Player
15	MF	ISL	Alexander Vokes
17	MF	ISL	Valdimar Jóhannsson
19	MF	ESP	Gonzalo Zamorano
20	MF	ISL	Guðmundur Tyrfingsson
21	MF	ISL	Aron Einarsson
22	DF	ISL	Þorsteinn Aron Antonsson
23	DF	ISL	Þór Llorens Þórðarson
24	DF	ISL	Elfar Ísak Halldórsson
25	FW	ISL	Sesar Örn Harðarson
28	GK	ISL	Þorkell Ingi Sigurdsson
45	FW	ISL	Þorlákur Breki Þ. Baxter
77	DF	ISL	Hrannar Snær Magnússon
99	MF	ISL	Óliver Þorkelsson

=== Women's football ===
In August 2019, the Selfoss women's football team won its first major trophy when it defeated KR in the Icelandic Cup final.

==== Titles ====
- Icelandic Cup: 2019

== Handball ==
=== Men's handball ===
In 2019, the Selfoss men's handball team won it first Icelandic Championships title when they beat Haukar 3–1 in the championship finals series.

==== Titles ====
- Icelandic champions: 2019
- 1. deild karla: 1998, 2001, 2010
- 2. deild karla: 1987
