= Knattspyrnufélagið Víðir =

Víðir
- Full name: Knattspyrnufélagið Víðir
- Nickname: Víðir Garði
- Founded: 11 May 1936
- Ground: Nesfisk-völlurinn, Garður, Iceland
- Capacity: 2000 (300 seated)
- League: 3. deild karla
- 2025: 2. deild karla, 11th of 12 (relegated)
Home colours	Away colours

Knattspyrnufélagið Víðir (Icelandic pronunciation: [ˈkʰnahtˌspɪ(r)tnʏˌfjɛːˌlaijɪð ˈviːðɪr̥], lit. 'Willow Football Club' (Note: Knattspyrnufélagið is the definite form of Knattspyrnufélag, meaning "the football club".)), commonly known as Víðir or Víðir Garði are an Icelandic sports club from Garður on the Reykjanes peninsula of Iceland. They were founded on 11 May 1936.

== Basketball ==
=== Women's basketball ===
During the 1994–1995 season, Víðir women's basketball team, coached by Helga Eiríksdóttir, won in the second tier 1. deild kvenna after going lossless through the season.

==== Titles ====
- 1. deild kvenna
  - Winners: 1995

== Football ==
=== Men's football ===
Víðir played in the Icelandic top-tier league from 1985 to 1987 and again in 1991, with 7th place being their best finish, in 1986. Víðir reached the final of the Icelandic Cup in 1987 at Laugardalsvöllur but lost against Fram.

==== Titles ====
- Icelandic Cup
  - Runner-up: 1987
- 1. deild karla
  - Winners: 1990
- 2. deild karla
  - Winners: 1982, 1998
- 3. deild karla
  - Winners: 2007

=== Current squad ===
As of 26 July 2025

Note: Flags indicate national team as defined under FIFA eligibility rules; some limited exceptions apply. Players may hold more than one non-FIFA nationality.

No.	Pos.	Nation	Player
—	FW	FRA	Alexis Alexandrenne
—	GK	ISL	Jón Garðar Arnarsson
—	DF	ISL	Einar Örn Andrésson
—	DF	ISL	Róbert Bagguley
—	MF	ESP	Daniel Benéitez
—	MF	USA	Cameron Briggs
—	FW	USA	Dominic Briggs
—	DF	ESP	Pablo Castiello
—	MF	USA	Paolo Gratton
—	GK	ISL	Eyþór Guðjónsson
—	MF	ISL	Þórir Guðmundsson
—	DF	ISL	Erlendur Guðnason
—	DF	ISL	Aron Örn Hákonarson
—	FW	ISL	Valur Þór Hákonarson

No.	Pos.	Nation	Player
—	MF	ISL	Ottó Helgason
—	MF	ISL	Haraldur Smári Ingason
—	FW	SRB	Uroŝ Jemović
—	MF	ISL	Kristófer Snær Jóhannsson
—	MF	ISL	Haraldur Daði Jónsson
—	FW	ISL	Markús Máni Jónsson
—	MF	ISL	Tómas Freyr Jónsson
—	GK	ARG	Joaquin Ketlun
—	MF	ISL	Björgvin Freyr Larsson
—	DF	NGA	Hammed Lawal
—	MF	ISL	Dusan Lukic
—	FW	ISL	Cristovão Martins
—	MF	ESP	Angel Rodríguez Malo
—	FW	ESP	David Toro
