= Íþróttafélagið Völsungur =

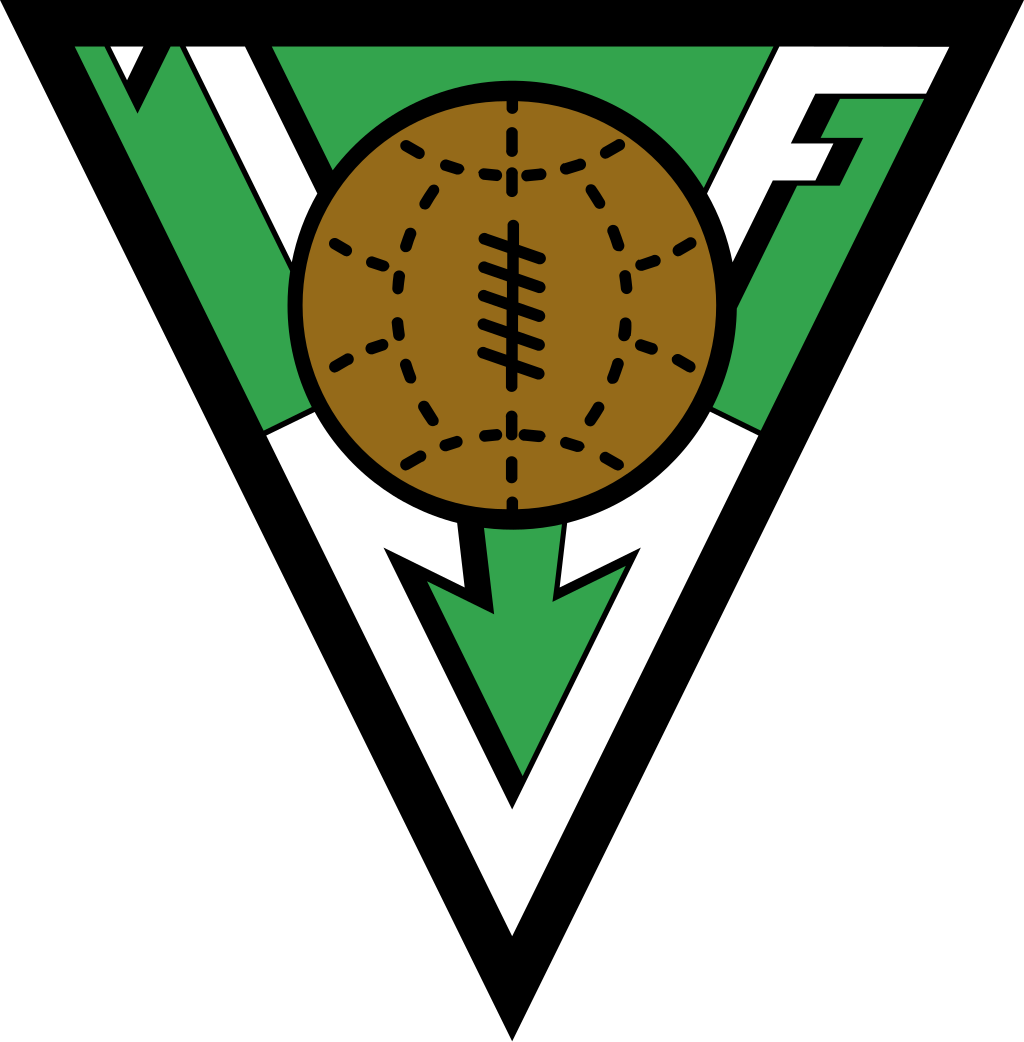
- Sports: Boccia; Cross-country skiing Football; Gymnastics; Handball; Swimming; Volleyball
- Founded: 12 April 1927
- Location: Húsavík, Iceland
- Colors: Green, white
- Website: Volsungur.is

Íþróttafélagið Völsungur (Icelandic pronunciation: [ˈiːˌθrouhtaˌfjɛːˌlaijɪð ˈvœlsuŋkʏr̥], lit. 'Völsungur Sports Club' (Note: Íþróttafélagið is the definite form of Íþróttafélag, meaning "the sports club".)) is an Icelandic multi-sport club from the town of Húsavík located on the north coast of Iceland on the shores of Skjálfandi bay.

== History ==
The club was founded on 12 April 1927 by around 25-28 boys, aged between 11 and 14 years old. The first president of the club was Jakob Hafstein. In 1933, the first girls joined the club.

== Football ==
Íþróttafélagið Völsungur
- Ground: Húsavíkurvöllur, Húsavík
- Capacity: 1,000
- League: 1. deild karla
- 2025: 1. deild karla, 7th of 12
| Home colours | Away colours |

ÍF Völsungur fields both men's and women's senior football teams along with junior teams. They play their home games at the Húsavíkurvöllur.

== Current squad ==
As of 15 August 2026

Note: Flags indicate national team as defined under FIFA eligibility rules; some limited exceptions apply. Players may hold more than one non-FIFA nationality.

| No. | Pos. | Nation | Player |
|---|---|---|---|
| 1 | GK | ISL | Jochum Magnússon (on loan from Víkingur) |
| 4 | DF | ESP | Juan Guardia |
| 5 | DF | ISL | Arnar Pálmi Kristjánsson |
| 6 | DF | ESP | Íñigo Albizuri |
| 7 | MF | ISL | Dagbjartur Búi Davíðsson |
| 8 | MF | ISL | Höskuldur Aegir Jónsson |
| 9 | FW | ISL | Elfar Arni Aðalsteinsson |
| 11 | DF | ISL | Gestur Aron Sörensson |
| 14 | MF | ESP | Xabi Cárdenas |
| 17 | MF | ISL | Aron Bjarki Kristjánsson |
| 18 | FW | ISL | Andri Steingrímsson |

| No. | Pos. | Nation | Player |
|---|---|---|---|
| 19 | MF | ISL | Tryggvi Grani Jóhannsson |
| 21 | MF | SWE | Modoumatarr Mbye |
| 23 | MF | ISL | Elmar Örn Guðmundsson |
| 31 | DF | ISL | Davíð Örn Aðalsteinsson (on loan from Þór Akureyri) |
| 32 | DF | ISL | Elvar Baldvinsson |
| 39 | DF | ISL | Indriði Ketilsson |
| 54 | MF | ESP | Sergio Parla |
| 77 | DF | ISL | Indriði Ketilsson |
| 88 | GK | ESP | Victor Méndez |
| 97 | FW | ISL | Tómas Bjarni Baldursson |
| — | GK | TRI | Javon Sample |
| — | MF | FRA | Walid Abdelali |

=== Out on loan ===
Note: Flags indicate national team as defined under FIFA eligibility rules; some limited exceptions apply. Players may hold more than one non-FIFA nationality.

| No. | Pos. | Nation | Player |

=== Titles ===
- 1. deild karla: 1986
- 2. deild karla: 1968, 1971, 1979, 1995, 2003, 2012
- 3. deild karla: 2009

=== Women's football ===
==== History ====
In 2019, Völsungur women's team won the 2. deild kvenna and achieved promotion to the 1. deild kvenna.

==== Titles ====
- 2. deild kvenna: 2019
