= Knattspyrnufélag Fjallabyggðar =

KF
- Nickname: KF
- Founded: 2010; 16 years ago (formerly two clubs, Leiftur and Knattspyrnufélag Siglufjarðar (KS))
- Ground: Ólafsfjarðarvöllur
- Capacity: 1,200 (306 seated)
- Chairman: Kristján Ragnar Ásgeirsson
- Manager: Slobodan Milišić
- League: 3. deild karla
- 2025: 3. deild karla, 10th of 12
- Website: https://kfbolti.is/
Home colours	Away colours

Knattspyrnufélag Fjallabyggðar (Icelandic pronunciation: [ˈkʰnahtˌspɪ(r)tnʏˌfjɛːˌlaːɣ ˈfjatlaˌpɪɣðar], lit. 'Fjallabyggð Football Club'), abbreviated as KF, is an Icelandic football club from the towns Ólafsfjörður and Siglufjörður who form the municipality Fjallabyggð, currently playing in the 2. deild karla. Their main colours are blue and white as a tertiary.

== History of KS and Leiftur ==
Íþróttafélagið Leiftur, from Ólafsfjörður, having spent most of their history in the lower leagues, were promoted to the Úrvalsdeild karla for the 1988 season, but went straight back down to the 1. deild karla (at the time, the 2.deild). They were promoted again in 1994 to the top league for the 1995 Úrvalsdeild season having missed out by a point in 1993.

Leiftur finished 5th in the Úrvalsdeild in their first season, finishing in 3rd the next two seasons, having some European adventures, the most notable being the 1997 UEFA Intertoto Cup, in which they lost narrowly at home 1–2 to Hamburger SV and won 3–4 away against OB. In 1998 they finished 5th, but were runners-up in the cup to ÍBV who won the league, qualifying the team for the UEFA Cup 1999-00. The team lost to RSC Anderlecht 9–1 on aggregate in the first round, but managed to finish third for the third time in four years, qualifying them for a fourth season of European football.

The year after, in 2000, the team was relegated from the Úrvalsdeild. After a mid-table finish in the 1.deild in 2001, the team merged with the club of neighbouring town Dalvík to become Leiftur/Dalvík, but this did not lead to success on the pitch as the team was relegated into the third tier of Icelandic football in 2003, and to the fourth tier in 2005. After that season Leiftur left the merger and merged with the team of another neighbouring town, Siglufjörður's Knattspyrnufélag Siglufjarðar (Siglufjörður Football Club), KS for short, to remain in the third tier, KS becoming KS/Leiftur. KS had previously had a few seasons in the second tier and produced future international players, but the most recent seasons in the second tier were not successful, with the club mostly staying in the third tier. Their last season in the second tier was a single season in 2005, merging with Leiftur after the season for the 2006 2. deild karla. Their best result in the second tier was a 3rd place in 1984 and a 4th place in 1985.

Although the divisions were expanded from 10 to 12 teams in 2006 and 2007, two teams were not relegated, so KS/Leiftur didn't get off to a good start after the merger. However, KS/Leiftur was never in serious danger of being demoted because the teams that were demoted scored very few points. The next season went better, with the team finishing 3rd and being promoted as an extra team because of the expansion of teams in the top three leagues. Their 2008 season in 1. deild karla (second tier) didn't go too well though, as the team only got 12 points from 22 matches, winning once and drawing nine times, finishing 12 points from safety. After finishing 8th (2009) and 9th (2010) in the 2. deild, the club took the next step and changed its name from KS/Leiftur to the united Knattspyrnufélag Fjallabyggðar, KF.

== Knattspyrnufélag Fjallabyggðar ==
Soon after the clubs of KS and Leiftur merged, their respective towns did effectively the same thing. The towns are connected with a tunnel through a mountain, a mountain that previously made travel between the towns much harder. So on 11 June 2006 Siglufjörður and Ólafsfjörður merged and the municipality of Fjallabyggð was created. Before the 2011 season, KS/Leiftur changed its name to Knattspyrnufélag Fjallabyggðar (Fjallabyggð Football Club), KF for short, and hired former international Lárus Orri Sigurðsson as manager. The team finished 6th after a very close season, where 10 teams out of 12 had a chance of promotion for most of the season. In the 2012 season the club got promoted to the 2013 1. deild karla.

== Current squad ==
As of 30 July 2024

Note: Flags indicate national team as defined under FIFA eligibility rules; some limited exceptions apply. Players may hold more than one non-FIFA nationality.

No.	Pos.	Nation	Player
—	MF	ISL	Auðun Gauti Auðunsson
—	MF	ISL	Grétar Áki Bergsson
—	MF	ISL	Marinó Snær Birgisson
—	DF	ESP	Edu Cruz
—	DF	CTA	Jordan Damachoua
—	FW	TRI	Akil DeFreitas
—	FW	CRO	Ljubomir Delić
—	FW	ISL	Sævar Þór Fylkisson
—	MF	ISL	Alex Máni Garðarsson
—	FW	ISL	Agnar Óli Grétarsson
—	GK	ISL	Halldór Ingvar Guðmundsson

No.	Pos.	Nation	Player
—	DF	ISL	Kjartan Orri Johnsson
—	MF	DEN	Daniel Kristiansen
—	DF	ISL	Aron Elí Kristjánsson
—	MF	ISL	Jón Frímann Kjartansson
—	GK	TRI	Javon Sample
—	FW	ITA	Jonas Schmalbach
—	DF	ISL	Anton Karl Sindrason
—	MF	ISL	Jakob Auðun Sindrason
—	MF	ISL	Þorsteinn Már Þorvaldsson
—	MF	ISL	Vitor Vieira Thomas

== Former players ==
Internationally capped and fully professional players

- (Faroe Islands) Uni Arge
- (Faroe Islands) Jens Martin Knudsen
- (Faroe Islands) John Petersen
- (Serbia) Ede Visinka
- (Iceland) Pétur Marteinsson
- (Iceland) Pétur Björn Jónsson (1992–1997)
- (Iceland) Grétar Rafn Steinsson
- (Scotland) Paul Kinnaird (1997)
- (Iceland) Heiðar Gunnólfsson
- (Iceland) Hákon Leó Hilmarsson
- (Iceland) Arnar Grétarsson
