= Þór Akureyri =

Icelandic sports club

- Full name: Íþróttafélagið Þór
- Nickname: Þórsarar
- Founded: 6 June 1915; 111 years ago
- Chairman: Nói Björnsson

Íþróttafélagið Þór (Icelandic pronunciation: [ˈiːˌθrouhtaˌfjɛːˌlaijɪð ˈθouːr̥], lit. 'Thor Sports Club'; (Note: Íþróttafélagið is the definite form of Íþróttafélag, meaning "the sports club".) commonly known as Þór Akureyri, [ˈθouːr̥ ˈaːkʏrˌeiːrɪ]; shortened to Þór or Thór) is a multi-sport club in Akureyri, in the north of Iceland. It features departments in basketball, football, handball and taekwondo. Its main rival is the local club Knattspyrnufélag Akureyrar (KA).

== Football ==
=== Women's team ===
Since 1999, the women's football team has fielded a joint team with neighbouring club KA under the name Þór/KA in the top-level league Úrvalsdeild. In 2006 the team finished 7th of 8 teams, 8th/9 in 2007, reaching a good 4th/10 in 2008 and then bettering those results with 3rd/10 in 2009 and a second-place finish in 2010. As Iceland was in the top 8 leagues of UEFA, the second place was enough for the team to qualify for the 2011–12 UEFA Women's Champions League. The team entered in the round of 32 but lost 14–2 on aggregate to German team Turbine Potsdam.

In 2010 the team also went to the semi-finals in the Icelandic cup, losing to the eventual winner Valur. In 1989 and 2013 they lost the cup final.

In 2012 Þór/KA finished first in the Úrvalsdeild and secured its first ever Icelandic championship.

On September 29, 2017, the club secured its second national championship by defeating FH, in the last game of the season, 2–0 with goals from Sandra Jessen and Sandra Stephany Mayor.

==== Trophies and achievements ====
- Úrvalsdeild kvenna (1):
  - 2012^{1}, 2017^{1}
- Icelandic Women's Football Cup:
  - Runner-up: 1989^{2}, 2013^{1}
- Icelandic Division I (2):
  - 1983^{2}, 1999^{1}
1. As Þór/KA
2. As Þór Akureyri

== Basketball ==
=== Men's basketball ===
==== Trophies and achievements ====
- Division I (5):
  - 1966–67, 1976–77, 1993–94, 2004–05, 2006–07, 2015–17
- Division II (2):
  - 1981–82, 2002–03

=== Women's basketball ===
==== Trophies and achievements ====
- Icelandic champions (3):
  - 1969, 1971, 1976
- Icelandic Basketball Cup (1):
  - 1975
- Division I (1):
  - 2017

== Handball ==
=== Women's handball ===
- 1. deild kvenna:
  - (gold) Gold medal: 2018
