= 2012 Icelandic Cup =

Tournament details
- Country: Iceland
- Teams: 76

Final positions
- Champions: KR
- Runners-up: Stjarnan

The 2012 Icelandic Cup, also known as the Borgunarbikar for sponsorship reasons, was the 53rd edition of the Icelandic national football cup. It began with the preliminary round on 1 May 2012 and was scheduled to end with the final on 18 August 2012 at Laugardalsvöllur. KR were the reigning champions, having won their twelfth Icelandic Cup the previous year.

== Preliminary round ==
The preliminary round consists of two teams from the lower Icelandic levels. The match were played on 1 May 2012.

Team 1	Score	Team 2
1 May 2012
Kormákur/Hvöt	1−0	Hamrarnir

== First round ==
The first round consisted of the winner from the preview round, 35 teams from the lower Icelandic levels and 10 clubs from the 2. deild karla. The matches were played between 6 May and 8 May 2012.

Team 1	Score	Team 2
4 May 2012
ÍH	2−1	Grundarfjörður
5 May 2012
KFS	2−1	Ármann
Huginn	1−4	Leiknir F.
6 May 2012
Dalvík/Reynir	4−1	Völsungur
HK	3−2 (a.e.t.)	KV
Stál-úlfur	1−4	Afturelding
Hamar	1−1 (a.e.t.); 4−3 (pen)	Hönd Mídasar
Reynir S.	8−0	SR
Njarðvík	10−1	Kjalnesingar
Magni	4−0	Kormákur/Hvöt
Gnúpverjar	0−2	Þróttur V.
KF	5−1	Drangey
8 May 2012
Léttir	2−1	Skínandi
Ísbjörninn	2−4	Ægir
Hvíti riddarinn	4−1	Afríka
Árborg	1−0	Víðir
Þór Þ.	3−1	Stokkseyri
KFR	2−2 (a.e.t.); 5−6 (pen)	KB
Elliði	1−2 (a.e.t.)	Björninn
Hómer	1−3	Augnablik
Kári	6−1	KH
9 May 2012
Berserkir	3−1	Álftanes
Ýmir	6−5	KFG

== Second round ==
The second round included the 23 winners from the previous round, 3 teams from the lower Icelandic leagues, 2 teams from the 2. deild karla and all 12 clubs from the 1. deild karla. The matches were played on 15, 16, 17 and 22 May 2012.

Team 1	Score	Team 2
15 May 2012
Augnablik	2−0	Hamar
16 May 2012
Magni	0−7	KA
Fákur	2−3	Víkingur R.
Fjarðabyggð	4−2	Sindri
Leiknir R.	3−1	HK
Njarðvík	4−2	ÍR
Léttir	0−5	Þróttur R.
Berserkir	1−2	Grótta
Ýmir	0−3	Reynir S.
Árborg	3−3 (a.e.t.); 4−5 (pen)	KB
Snæfell	0−31	Haukar
Ægir	1−4	Víkingur Ó
Höttur	7−1	Leiknir F.
Afturelding	3−0	Kári
Björninn	0−1	Þróttur V.
Dalvík/Reynir	2−0	Tindastóll
17 May 2012
BÍ/Bolungarvík	4−3	ÍH
Þór Þ.	0−6	Fjölnir
Hvíti riddarinn	2−5	KFS
22 May 2012
KF	1−3	Þór

== Third round ==
The third round included the 20 winners from the previous round and the 12 clubs from the Úrvalsdeild. These matches were played on 6, 7, 8 and 12 June 2012.

Team 1	Score	Team 2
6 June 2012
Keflavík	0−1	Grindavik
Fram	1−1 (a.e.t.); 4−3 (pen)	Haukar
Víkingur R.	2−0	Fjölnir
Leiknir R.	1−2	Þróttur R.
KA	2−0	Fjarðabyggð
Augnablik	1−4	Höttur
Dalvík/Reynir	1−3	Reynir S.
7 June 2012
KFS	0−1	KB
Selfoss	2−1	Njarðvík
Stjarnan	4−1	Grótta
Þróttur V.	1−3	Afturelding
8 June 2012
FH	1−1 (a.e.t.); 2−3 (pen)	Fylkir
Þór	1−4	Valur
Breiðablik	5−0	BÍ/Bolungarvík
ÍA	1−2	KR
12 June 2012
Víkingur Ó	0−2	ÍBV

== Fourth round ==
The fourth round consisted of the 16 winners of the previous round. These matches were played on 25 and 26 June 2012.

Team 1	Score	Team 2
21 June 2012
Þróttur R.	2−1 (a.e.t.)	Valur
25 June 2012
ÍBV	6−1	Höttur
KA	2−3	Grindavik
Afturelding	2−3	Fram
Stjarnan	1−0 (a.e.t.)	Reynir S.
Selfoss	4−0	KB
26 June 2012
KR	3−0	Breiðablik
Víkingur R.	2−1	Fylkir

== Quarterfinals ==
This round consisted of the eight winners of the previous round. These matches were played on 8 and 9 July 2012.

Team 1	Score	Team 2
8 July 2012
ÍBV	1–2	KR
Þróttur R.	3–0	Selfoss
Víkingur R.	0–3	Grindavik
9 July 2012
Stjarnan	2–1	Fram

== Semifinals ==
The semifinal matches involved the four winners from the quarter-final round and were played on 1 and 2 August 2012.

1 August 2012
19:15 GMT

Stjarnan	3–0	Þróttur R.
Doninger 25', 66'; Scholz 83'	Report

Stjörnuvöllur, Garðabær
Attendance: 1,197
Referee: Magnús Þórisson

2 August 2012
19:15 GMT

Grindavík	0–1	KR
	Report	Martin 43'

Grindavíkurvöllur, Grindavík
Referee: Erlendur Eiríksson

== Final ==
The final took place at Laugardalsvöllur on 18 August 2012 and was contested between the winners of the previous semi-final matches.

18 August 2012
16:00 GMT

Stjarnan	1–2	KR
Jóhannsson 6'	Report	Martin 32'; Sigurðsson 84'

Laugardalsvöllur, Reykjavík
Attendance: 5,080
Referee: Þóroddur Hjaltalín Jr.
