= 2011 Icelandic Cup =

Tournament details
- Country: Iceland

Final positions
- Champions: KR
- Runners-up: Þór

The 2011 Visa-Bikar was the 52nd season of the Icelandic national football cup. It began on 30 April 2011 and ended with the final in August 2011 at Laugardalsvöllur. FH were the reigning champions, having won their second Icelandic cup last year.

KR won the cup after beating Þór 2-0 in the final. As KR also won the league, they qualified for the 2012–13 UEFA Champions League and Þór will enter the first qualifying round of UEFA Europa League as losing cup finalists.

== First round ==
The First Round consisted of 33 teams from the lower Icelandic levels and five clubs from the 2. deild karla. The matches were played between 30 April and 4 May 2011.

Team 1	Score	Team 2
30 April 2011
UMF Álftanes	0–2	KFS
Dalvík/Reynir	3–2	Magni
1 May 2011
Víðir	7–0	Hómer Reykjavík
KFR	3–1	KB
Ægir	2–4	KV
Hamar	2–0	Carl
Elliði	5–2	Grundarfjörður
Draupnir	3–2	Kormákur
Hvíti riddarinn	0–7	Björninn
Ísbjörninn	5–2	Höfrungur
Vængir Júpiters	1–2	Kári
Afríka	1–7	Árborg
KFG	4–2	Ýmir
2 May 2011
Afturelding	3–0	Gnúpverjar
Berserkir	2–1	Augnablik
3 May 2011
Þróttur Vogum	2–3	UMF Kjalnesinga
Markaregn	1–5	ÍH
4 May 2011
Ármann	4–3	Skallagrímur
KH Hlídarendi	3–0^{1}	Léttir

- ^{1}Original score 3–4. Later awarded 3–0.

== Second round ==
The Second Round included the 19 winners from the previous round as well as 2 clubs from the lower Icelandic levels, 7 clubs from the 2. deild karla and all 12 clubs from the 1. deild karla. The matches were played on 8, 9 and 18 May 2011.

Team 1	Score	Team 2
8 May 2011
Dalvík/Reynir	0–1	KF
Leiknir F.	3–2	UMF Sindri
Elliði	0–1	UMF Kjalnesinga
Vikingur Ó.	1–0	Leiknir R.
KFS	3–0	Árborg
Kári	0–7	Reynir S.
Völsungur	4–3 (a.e.t.)	Tindastóll/Hvöt
Ísbjörninn	0–10	Fjölnir
9 May 2011
Afturelding	0–1	KV
ÍR	6–0	Víðir
Þróttur R.	5–0	Ármann
Höttur	5–2	Fjarðabyggð
Selfoss	2–2 (a.e.t.); 5−4 (pen)	ÍA
Grótta	0–2	Haukar
Draupnir	0–3	KA
KFR	1–4	HK
Björninn	0–1	Njarðvík
KFG	1–3	BÍ/Bolungarvík
ÍH	1–2	Berserkir
18 May 2011
KH Hlídarendi	0–7	Hamar

== Third round ==
The Third round included the 20 winners from the previous round and the 12 clubs from the Úrvalsdeild. These matches were played between 24 and 26 May 2011.

24 May 2011
18:00 GMT

Hamar	2–0	KFS
I. Björgvinsson 24'; R. Sigurjónsson 61'

Grýluvöllur, Hveragerði
Referee: Snorri Páll Einarsson

25 May 2011
18:00 GMT

UMF Kjalnesinga	0–3	ÍBV
		Valdimarsson 16'; Borgþórsson 70' (pen.); Jeffs 79'

Framvöllur, Reykjavík
Referee: Þórður Már Gylfason

25 May 2011
18:00 GMT

BÍ/Bolungarvík	5–1	Reynir S.
Brown 11', 13'; Sverrisson 67'; Grétarsson 89'; Marshall 90'		Þorrsteison 38'

Torfnesvöllur, Skeiðisvöllur
Referee: Valgeir Valgeirsson

25 May 2011
19:15 GMT

Fjölnir	1–0	Selfoss
V. Guðjónsson 13'

Fjölnisvöllur, Reykjavík
Referee: Þóroddur Hjaltalín Jr.

25 May 2011
19:15 GMT

Haukar	2–0	KF
G. Grétarsson 26'; H. Emilsson 45'

Ásvellir, Hafnarfjörður
Referee: Örvar Sær Gíslason

25 May 2011
19:15 GMT

Valur	2–1 (a.e.t.)	Vikingur Ó.
J. Ákason 12'; H. Sigurðsson 115'		B. Kristmundsson 43'

Vodafonevöllurinn, Reykjavík
Referee: Erlendur Eiríksson

25 May 2011
19:15 GMT

Stjarnan	0–3	KR
		V. Arnarsson 45', 71'; D. Snorrason 65'

Stjörnuvöllur, Garðabær
Referee: Þorvaldur Árnason

25 May 2011
19:15 GMT

Njarðvík	0–1	HK
		O. Ómarsson 60'

Njarðtaksvöllurinn, Reykjanesbær
Referee: Garðar Örn Hinriksson

25 May 2011
19:15 GMT

ÍR	1–3 (a.e.t.)	Þróttur R.
K. Björnsson 42'		S. Jónasson 90+2', 107'; H. Hermannsson 115'

ÍR-völlur, Reykjavík
Referee: Kristinn Jakobsson

25 May 2011
19:15 GMT

Berserkir	1–3	Fram
K. Andrésson 73'		T. Leifsson 50'; G. Magnússon 66', 80'

Víkingsvöllur, Reykjavík
Referee: Jan Eric Jessen

25 May 2011
19:15 GMT

KA	1–2	Grindavík
H. Steingrímsson 76'		M. Pospisil 13', 62'

Boginn, Akureyri
Referee: Guðmundur Ársæll Guðmundsson

26 May 2011
17:30 GMT

Höttur	0–5	Keflavík
		H. Guðmundsson 42'; B. Guðmundsson 60'; A. Larsson 79'; J. Guðmundsson 82'; M. Matthíasson 90'

Fellavöllur, Egilsstaðir
Referee: Vilhjálmur Alvar Þórarinsson

26 May 2011
19:15 GMT

Breiðablik	2–1	Völsungur
H. Baldvinsson 10'; V. Illugason 28'		H. Steingrímsson 76'

Kópavogsvöllur, Kópavogur
Referee: Gunnar Jarl Jónsson

26 May 2011
19:15 GMT

KV	0–2	Vikingur R.
		K. Roofe 77'; M. Breim 86'

KR-völlur, Reykjavík
Referee: Leiknir Ágústsson

26 May 2011
19:15 GMT

Þór	5–0	Leiknir F.
O. Reynisson 26'; D. Disztl 36', 87'; G. Guðmundsson 55'; G. Helgason 68'

Boginn, Akureyri
Referee: Bjarni Hrannar Héðinsson

26 May 2011
20:00 GMT

FH	3–2 (a.e.t.)	Fylkir
P. Viðarsson 25'; H. Sigurðsson 67'; F. Bjarnason 97'		G. Einarsson 18'; A. Ingason 34'

Kaplakrikavöllur, Hafnarfjörður
Referee: Magnús Þórisson

== Fourth round ==
This round consisted of the 16 winners of the previous round. These matches were played on 20, 21 and 23 June 2011.

20 June 2011
18:30 GMT

Þór	3–1	Vikingur R.
M. Þormar 23' (o.g.); S. Jónsson 82'; G. Guðmundsson 90+3'		H. Sigurðsson 50'

Þórsvöllur, Akureyri
Referee: Guðmundur Ársæll Guðmundsson

20 June 2011
19:15 GMT

Haukar	1–3	Keflavík
H. Arnarsson 33'		G. Steinarsson 4'; A. Birgisson 22'; B. Guðmundsson 75'

Ásvellir, Hafnarfjörður
Referee: Þorvaldur Árnason

20 June 2011
19:15 GMT

Fjölnir	3–2	Hamar
B. Gunnarsson 30', 55' (pen.); K. Sigurdsson 40'		A. Kristinsson 49'; R. Sigurjónsson 56'

Fjölnisvöllur, Reykjavík
Referee: Jan Eric Jessen

21 June 2011
18:00 GMT

Valur	2–3	ÍBV
G. Lýðsson 40'; C. Mouritsen 50'		T. Guðmundsson 8', 14'; I. Jeffs 32'

Vodafonevöllurinn, Reykjavík
Referee: Örvar Sær Gíslason

21 June 2011
19:15 GMT

Grindavík	2–1	HK
M. Björgvinsson 14', 19'		H. Briem 32'

Grindavíkurvöllur, Grindavík
Referee: Pétur Guðmundsson

21 June 2011
19:15 GMT

Þróttur R.	3–1	Fram
S. Jónasson 9' (pen.), 34' (pen.), 60'		A. Ormarsson 48'

Valbjarnarvöllur, Reykjavík
Referee: Valgeir Valgeirsson

23 June 2011
19:15 GMT

BÍ/Bolungarvík	4–1 (a.e.t.)	Breiðablik
T. Ameobi 73', 115'; S. Gylfason 107', 120+3'		A. Aðalsteinsson 28'

Torfnesvöllur, Skeiðisvöllur
Referee: Þórður Már Gylfason

23 June 2011
20:00 GMT

KR	2–0	FH
G. Jónsson 51'; G. Sigurðsson 87'

KR-völlur, Reykjavík
Referee: Gunnar Jarl Jónsson

== Quarter-finals ==
This round consisted of the 8 winners of the previous round. These matches were played on 2 and 3 July 2011.

2 July 2011
16:00 GMT

Þór	2–1 (a.e.t.)	Grindavík
D. Disztl 20'; I. Hilmarsson 120'		M. Björgvinsson 45'

Þórsvöllur, Akureyri
Referee: Magnús Þórisson

3 July 2011
14:00 GMT

BÍ/Bolungarvík	3–2	Þróttur R.
H. Agnarsson 4'; A. Þórarinsson 9'; N. Deverdics 65'		G. Ómarsson 1'; S. Jónasson 66'

Torfnesvöllur, Skeiðisvöllur
Referee: Kristinn Jakobsson

3 July 2011
17:00 GMT

Fjölnir	1–2	ÍBV
G. Gunnarsson 81'		B. Hughes 76' (pen.); B. Guðjónsson 86'

Fjölnisvöllur, Reykjavík
Referee: Þóroddur Hjaltalín Jr.

3 July 2011
20:00 GMT

KR	3–2	Keflavík
B. Sigurðsson 8'; B. Guðjónsson 41'; G. Baldvinsson 58'		M. Magnússon 5'; A. Birgisson 65'

KR-völlur, Reykjavík
Referee: Valgeir Valgeirsson

== Semi-finals ==
The semi-final matches involve the four winners from the previous quarter-final round on 28 July 2011.

27 July 2011
19:15 GMT

Þór	2–0	ÍBV
Disztl 11'; S. Jónsson 54'

Þórsvöllur, Akureyri
Referee: Kristinn Jakobsson

31 July 2011
16:00 GMT

BÍ/Bolungarvík	1–4	KR
G. Elíasson 45'		H. Sigurðsson 37', 80', 84'; G. Jónsson 90+2'

Torfnesvöllur, Skeiðisvöllur
Referee: Örvar Sær Gíslason

== Final ==
The final took place at Laugardalsvöllur on 13 August 2011 and was contested between the winners of the previous semi-final matches.

13 August 2011
14:00 GMT

Þór	0–2	KR
		G. Guðmundsson 45' (o.g.); B. Sigurðsson 82'

Laugardalsvöllur, Reykjavík
Attendance: 5,327
Referee: Valgeir Valgeirsson
