= Aleksandar Linta =

Serbian footballer (born 1975)

Personal information
- Date of birth: 22 October 1975 (age 51)
- Place of birth: Zemun, SFR Yugoslavia
- Position: Defender

Youth career
- Zemun

Senior career*
Years	Team	Apps	(Gls)
- Balkan Mirijevo
- FK Beograd
1997	ÍA Akranes	12	(0)
1999–2000	Skallagrímur	28	(2)
2001	Zeta	10	(0)
2001	Mladost Apatin		
- Zemun
2003	ÍA Akranes	3	(0)
2003–2005	Víkingur Ólafsvík	37	(4)
2006–2007	KA Akureyri	27	(3)
2008–2011	Þór Akureyri	74	(16)
2012–2013	Grundarfjörður	25	(1)

Managerial career
- 2018: Olimpija Ljubljana (assistant)
- 2018: Olimpija Ljubljana
- 2019–2020: Irtysh Pavlodar (assistant)
- 2020–2021: Radnički Kragujevac
- 2021–2022: Serbia U19
- 2022: Radnik Surdulica
- 2022: Mladost Novi Sad
- 2023: Železničar Pančevo
- 2024–2026: Red Star Belgrade (youth)
- 2026-: ÍBV
- * Club domestic league appearances and goals

Aleksandar Linta (Serbian Cyrillic: Александар Линта; born 22 October 1975) is a Serbian football manager of icelandic Besta deild karla club ÍBV and former player.

== Coaching career ==
In 2018 Linta was the assistant to Ilija Stolica in Olimpija Ljubljana before taking over as head coach in the same year after Stolica left the club. Under his leadership Olimpija Ljubljana advanced in the second qualification round of the UEFA Europa League beating Finnish champions HJK Helsinki 3–0 and 4–1 qualifying for the third round against Spartak Trnava.

In 2019 Linta became assistant coach at Kazakhstani side Irtysh Pavlodar.

In 2020 he was appointed manager of Serbian First League club Radnički Kragujevac.

== Career statistics ==
Appearances and goals by club, season and competition
Club	Season	League			National cup (Note: Includes Icelandic Men's Football Cup.)		Europe		Other		Total	
Club	Season	Division	Apps	Goals	Apps	Goals	Apps	Goals	Apps	Goals	Apps	Goals
Balkan Mirijevo												
Beograd												
IA Akranes	1997	Úrvalsdeild	12	0			1	0			13	0
Skallagrimur	1999	1. deild karla	13	0			–				13	0
Skallagrimur	2000	1. deild karla	15	2			–				15	2
Skallagrimur	Total		28	2			0	0			28	2
Zeta	2000–01	First League of FR Yugoslavia	10	0			–					
Mladost Apatin	2001–02	First League of FR Yugoslavia					–					
Zemun	2002–03						–					
IA Akranes	2003	Úrvalsdeild	3	0			–				3	0
Vikingur	2003	3. deild karla	4	0			–		5 (Note: Appearances in 3. deild karla Úrslit)	1	9	1
Vikingur	2004	2. deild karla	16	3	1	0	–		–		17	3
Vikingur	2005	1. deild karla	17	1	2	1	–		–		19	2
Vikingur	Total		37	4	3	1	0	0	5	1	45	6
KA Akureyri	2006	1. deild karla	10	0	4	0	–		–		14	0
KA Akureyri	2007	1. deild karla	17	3	1	0	–		–		18	3
KA Akureyri	Total		27	3	5	0	0	0	0	0	32	3
Þór Akureyri	2008	1. deild karla	21	6	2	0	–		–		23	6
Þór Akureyri	2009	1. deild karla	17	2	1	0	–		–		18	2
Þór Akureyri	2010	1. deild karla	20	8	2	0	–		–		22	8
Þór Akureyri	2011	1. deild karla	16	0	2	0	–		–		18	0
Þór Akureyri	Total		74	16	7	0	0	0	0	0	81	16
Grundarfjördur	2012	3. deild karla	15	1	0	0	–		1 (Note: Appearance in 3. deild karla Aukakeppni)	0	16	1
Grundarfjördur	2013	3. deild karla	10	0	0	0	–		0	0	10	0
Grundarfjördur	Total		25	1	0	0	0	0	1	0	26	1
Career total			194	26	15	1	1	0	6	1	216	28
