= 2009 2. deild karla =

2. deild karla
- Season: 2009
- Champions: Grótta
- Relegated: Magni; Tindastóll
- Matches: 132
- Goals: 473 (3.58 per match)
- Biggest home win: Reynir S. 5-0 Magni
- Biggest away win: Víðir 0-4 Grótta; Hamar 0-4 KS/Leiftur; Hamar 0-4 Magni
- Highest scoring: Grótta 6-3 Hvöt; Reynir S. 6-3 Víðir; Höttur 4-5 Magni; Hvöt 4-5 Reynir S.

The 2009 season of 2. deild karla is the 44th season of second-tier football in Iceland.

== Stadia and locations ==
Location of teams in the 2. deild karla 2009

Team	Location	Stadium	Stadium capacity
BÍ/Bolungarvík	Ísafjörður/Bolungarvík	Torfnesvöllur	800
Grótta	Seltjarnarnes	Gróttuvöllur	1,500
Hamar	Hveragerði	Grýluvöllur	2,000
Hvöt	Blönduós	Blönduósvöllur	1,000
Höttur	Egilsstaðir	Vilhjálmsvöllur	500
ÍH/HV	Hafnarfjörður	Ásvellir	1,400
KS/Leiftur	Fjallabyggð	Siglufjarðarvöllur	1,000
Magni	Grenivík	Grenivíkurvöllur	1,000
Njarðvík	Reykjanesbær	Njarðtaksvöllurinn	2,880
Reynir S.	Sandgerði	Sparisjóðsvöllur	1,500
Tindastóll	Sauðárkrókur	Sauðárkróksvöllur	300
Víðir	Garður	Garðsvöllur	2,000

== League table ==
Pos	Team	Pld	W	D	L	GF	GA	GD	Pts	Promotion or relegation
1	Grótta (C, P)	22	13	6	3	53	26	+27	45	Promotion to 2010 1. deild karla
2	Njarðvík (P)	22	11	7	4	40	21	+19	40	Promotion to 2010 1. deild karla
3	Reynir S.	22	12	3	7	52	42	+10	39	
4	Hvöt	22	10	5	7	58	49	+9	35	
5	BÍ/Bolungarvík	22	8	9	5	42	36	+6	33	
6	ÍH/HV	22	8	5	9	37	47	−10	29	
7	Höttur	22	7	6	9	32	31	+1	27	
8	KS/Leiftur	22	7	6	9	43	44	−1	27	
9	Víðir	22	7	6	9	27	37	−10	27	
10	Hamar	22	6	5	11	28	54	−26	23	
11	Tindastóll (R)	22	5	5	12	24	38	−14	20	Relegation to 2010 3. deild karla
12	Magni (R)	22	6	1	15	37	48	−11	19	Relegation to 2010 3. deild karla

Source: rsssf.com
Rules for classification: 1) points; 2) goal difference; 3) number of goals scored.
(C) Champions; (P) Promoted; (R) Relegated

== Results ==
Each team play every opponent once home and away for a total of 22 matches.

Home \ Away	BÍB	GRÓ	HAM	HÖT	HVÖ	ÍHH	KSL	MAG	NJA	REY	TIN	VIÐ
BÍ/Bolungarvík		1–1	1–1	1–2	4–2	5–1	0–0	3–2	0–3	3–2	2–1	1–1
Grótta	1–1		4–1	1–0	6–3	4–1	3–2	3–2	3–0	4–2	0–0	2–3
Hamar	4–3	1–4		0–0	2–5	2–2	0–4	0–4	1–0	1–0	1–1	2–1
Höttur	1–1	1–1	1–1		5–3	1–2	2–1	4–5	1–2	1–2	2–0	0–1
Hvöt	1–1	2–3	6–2	3–2		4–1	3–3	3–0	3–2	4–5	1–0	0–0
ÍH/HV	1–2	1–1	3–1	1–2	2–1		2–2	2–1	2–1	2–4	1–1	3–1
KS/Leiftur	2–2	2–1	2–3	0–2	3–2	3–5		2–1	0–2	3–1	3–2	2–2
Magni	1–2	0–3	1–2	1–1	2–3	4–2	3–2		1–3	3–0	1–2	1–2
Njarðvík	1–1	0–0	4–1	2–0	1–1	4–0	2–2	2–1		1–1	0–0	1–0
Reynir S.	4–3	3–1	2–0	0–2	2–2	1–2	4–3	5–0	2–2		3–1	6–3
Tindastóll	2–4	0–3	2–1	2–1	2–4	2–1	1–2	2–0	0–3	1–2		1–1
Víðir	2–1	0–4	4–1	1–1	1–2	0–0	1–0	0–3	1–4	0–1	2–1	

Updated to match(es) played on unknown. Source: rsssf.com
Legend: Blue = home team win; Yellow = draw; Red = away team win.

== Top scorers ==
Scorer	Goals	Team
(Iceland) Ragnar Haukur Hauksson	18	KS/Leiftur
(Bosnia and Herzegovina) Muamer Sadikovic	17	Hvöt
(Iceland) Rafn Markús Vilbergsson	16	Njarðvík
(Iceland) Sigurvin Ólafsson	12	Grótta
(Iceland) Hjörvar Hermannsson	12	Reynir S.
(Iceland) Jóhann Magni Jóhannsson	11	Reynir S.
