= 2011 2. deild karla =

2. deild karla
- Season: 2011
- Champions: Tindastóll/Hvöt
- Promoted: Höttur
- Relegated: Árborg; ÍH
- Matches played: 132
- Goals scored: 544 (4.12 per match)
- Top goalscorer: Jóhann Magni Jóhannsson & Andri Fannar Freysson (17)
- Biggest home win: Hamar 6–0 Dalvík/Reynir; Völsungur 6–0 Árborg; Afturelding 6–0 ÍH
- Biggest away win: ÍH 0–6 Njarðvík
- Highest scoring: KF 7–4 Völsungur

The 2011 2. deild karla was the third tier of Icelandic football in the 2011 season.

== League table ==
Pos	Team	Pld	W	D	L	GF	GA	GD	Pts	Promotion or relegation
1	Tindastóll/Hvöt (C, P)	22	13	3	6	49	36	+13	42	Promotion to 2012 1. deild karla
2	Höttur (P)	22	12	5	5	48	31	+17	41	Promotion to 2012 1. deild karla
3	Njarðvík	22	11	6	5	63	44	+19	39	
4	Afturelding	22	12	3	7	48	32	+16	39	
5	Dalvík/Reynir	22	12	2	8	50	51	−1	38	
6	KF	22	9	7	6	48	35	+13	34	
7	Fjarðabyggð	22	10	4	8	33	36	−3	34	
8	Reynir S.	22	10	2	10	61	57	+4	32	
9	Hamar	22	9	3	10	40	41	−1	30	
10	Völsungur	22	8	2	12	54	56	−2	26	
11	Árborg (R)	22	2	5	15	20	54	−34	11	Relegation to 2012 3. deild karla
12	ÍH (R)	22	2	2	18	30	71	−41	8	Relegation to 2012 3. deild karla

Updated to match(es) played on 17 September 2011. Source: ksi.is (in Icelandic)
Rules for classification: 1) points; 2) goal difference; 3) number of goals scored.
(C) Champions; (P) Promoted; (R) Relegated

== Results grid ==
Home \ Away	AFT	ÁRB	DVR	KFF	HAM	HÖT	ÍH	KF	NJA	REY	TIN	VÖL
Afturelding		5–1	1–4	3–0	2–1	0–3	6–0	3–3	1–2	1–0	5–0	5–2
Árborg	0–1		1–2	1–1	0–1	1–3	2–2	1–1	0–4	2–2	0–3	1–0
Dalvík/Reynir	1–0	4–1		3–0	2–0	2–2	2–0	2–1	1–4	3–1	3–4	0–4
Fjarðabyggð	2–2	2–1	1–2		1–0	0–1	2–1	2–2	1–0	2–1	1–2	3–0
Hamar	2–0	1–1	6–0	4–0		3–2	3–4	2–1	1–2	2–3	2–1	2–2
Höttur	0–2	2–0	4–1	1–2	5–1		2–1	1–1	2–5	5–2	1–0	1–0
ÍH	1–2	1–3	2–2	1–3	1–3	0–2		0–1	0–6	1–5	3–6	4–2
KF	2–0	5–2	0–3	4–1	5–0	1–1	3–2		4–4	1–2	2–0	7–4
Njarðvík	1–1	4–2	1–5	3–3	2–3	1–3	5–3	1–1		6–4	1–1	5–0
Reynir S.	4–5	3–0	6–3	0–4	1–1	2–1	7–2	2–0	6–3		1–4	5–2
Tindastóll/Hvöt	2–1	1–0	5–2	1–2	4–1	1–1	2–1	2–1	1–1	3–2		4–2
Völsungur	1–2	6–0	7–3	3–0	2–1	5–5	2–0	0–2	1–2	6–2	3–2	

Updated to match(es) played on 17 September 2011. Source: ksi.is (in Icelandic)
Legend: Blue = home team win; Yellow = draw; Red = away team win.

== Top goalscorers ==
Name	Goals	Club
Jóhann Magni Jóhannsson	17	Reynir S.
Andri Fannar Freysson	17	Njarðvík
Haraldur Árni Hróðmarsson	15	Hamar
Arnar Sigurðsson	13	Tindastóll/Hvöt
Elfar Árni Aðalsteinsson	13	Völsungur
Ólafur Jón Jónsson	12	Njarðvík
Egill Gautur Steingrímsson	11	Afturelding
Mirnes Smajlovic	11	Fjarðabyggð
Þorsteinn Þorsteinsson	11	Reynir S.
