= 1980 2. deild karla =

Icelandic football league season

The 1980 season of 2. deild karla was the 15th season of third-tier football in Iceland.

== Group A ==
Pos	Team	Played	Points	Notes
1	Reynir S.	12	22	Advanced to final round
2	Leiknir R.	12	17	
3	ÍK	12	14	
4	Léttir	12	13	
5	Óðinn	12	8	
6	Katla	12	6	
7	Hekla	12	4	

== Group B ==
Pos	Team	Played	Points	Notes
1	Grindavík	12	19	Advanced to final round
2	Víðir	12	17	
3	Njarðvík	12	15	
4	Afturelding	12	14	
5	Grótta	12	11	
6	Stjarnan	12	6	
7	Hamar	12	4	

== Group C ==
Pos	Team	Played	Points	Notes
1	Skallagrímur	10	15	Advanced to final round
2	HÞV	10	14	
3	Bolungarvík	10	12	
4	Víkingur Ó.	10	11	
5	Snæfell	10	8	
6	Reynir H.	10	0	

== Group D ==
Pos	Team	Played	Points	Notes
1	HSÞ-b	8	12	Advanced to final round
2	KS	8	10	
3	Magni	8	7	
4	Árroðinn	8	7	
5	Leiftur	8	4	

== Group E ==
Pos	Team	Played	Points	Notes
1	Tindastóll	8	16	Advanced to final round
2	Reynir Á.	8	11	
3	Dagsbrún	8	6	
4	Ungmennasamband Austur-Húnvetninga	8	5	
5	Efling	8	2	

== Group F ==
Pos	Team	Played	Points	Notes
1	Einherji	12	21	Advanced to final round
2	Sindri	12	13	
3	Huginn	12	12	
4	Hrafnkell Freysgoði	12	12	
5	Leiknir F.	12	8	
6	Súlan	12	9	
7	Valur Reyð.	12	6	

== Final round ==
=== Group A ===
Pos	Team	Pld	W	D	L	GF	GA	GD	Pts	Promotion
1	Reynir S.	4	2	2	0	8	5	+3	6	Promoted
2	Einherji	4	1	2	1	9	8	+1	4	
3	HSÞ-b	4	0	2	2	4	8	−4	2	

=== Group B ===
Pos	Team	Pld	W	D	L	GF	GA	GD	Pts	Promotion
1	Skallagrímur	4	1	2	1	8	7	+1	4	Promoted
2	Tindastóll	4	1	2	1	9	8	+1	4	
3	Grindavík	4	1	2	1	3	5	−2	4	

=== Final ===
Team 1	Score	Team 2
Reynir S.	4–2	Skallagrímur

Both Reynir S. and Skallagrímur won promotion to the 1981 1. deild karla.
