= 2005 2. deild karla =

2. deild karla
- Season: 2005
- Champions: Leiknir R.
- Promoted: Stjarnan
- Relegated: Tindastóll; Leiftur/Dalvík
- Matches played: 90
- Goals scored: 308 (3.42 per match)
- Top goalscorer: Þorvaldur Árnason & Guðjón Baldvinsson (14)
- Biggest home win: Huginn 7–1 Leiftur/Dalvík
- Biggest away win: 4 goals (4 occasions)
- Highest scoring: 8 goals (6 occasions)

The 2005 2. deild karla was the 40th season of third-tier football in Iceland. The league began on 16 May and was concluded on 10 September. It was contested by a total of ten clubs.

== Teams ==
The 2005 2. deild karla was contested by ten clubs, six of which had played in the division during the previous season. 2004 champions KS and runners-up Víkingur Ólafsvík were promoted to the second tier; replacing them were Njarðvík and Stjarnan, both relegated from the 1. deild after finishing in the bottom two places at the end of the 2004 campaign. Also joining the division were Fjarðabyggð and Huginn, who were promoted from the 3. deild through the play-offs. Fjarðabyggð had reached the third tier of Icelandic football for the first time in their history after being founded in 2001.

=== Stadia and locations ===
Club name	Location	Stadium
Afturelding	Mosfellsbær	Varmárvöllur
Fjarðabyggð	Fjarðabyggð	Eskifjarðarvöllur
Huginn	Seyðisfjörður	Seyðisfjarðarvöllur
ÍR	Reykjavík	ÍR-völlur
Leiftur/Dalvík	Dalvík/Ólafsfjörður	Dalvíkurvöllur/Ólafsfjarðarvöllur
Leiknir Reykjavík	Reykjavík	Leiknisvöllur
Njarðvík	Njarðvík	Njarðvíkurvöllur
Selfoss	Selfoss	Selfossvöllur
Stjarnan	Garðabær	Stjörnuvöllur
Tindastóll	Sauðárkrókur	Sauðárkróksvöllur

== League table ==
Pos	Team	Pld	W	D	L	GF	GA	GD	Pts	Promotion or relegation
1	Leiknir R. (C, P)	18	11	4	3	38	21	+17	37	Promotion to 2006 1. deild karla
2	Stjarnan (P)	18	9	6	3	42	25	+17	33	Promotion to 2006 1. deild karla
3	Njarðvík	18	9	4	5	34	21	+13	31	
4	Fjarðabyggð	18	8	5	5	31	24	+7	29	
5	Selfoss	18	8	2	8	27	30	−3	26	
6	ÍR	18	6	5	7	27	32	−5	23	
7	Afturelding	18	6	4	8	35	35	0	22	
8	Huginn	18	5	4	9	35	37	−2	19	
9	Tindastóll (R)	18	4	4	10	16	38	−22	16	Relegation to 2006 3. deild karla
10	Leiftur/Dalvík (R)	18	3	4	11	23	45	−22	13	Relegation to 2006 3. deild karla

Updated to match(es) played on 10 September 2005. Source: ksi.is (in Icelandic)
Rules for classification: 1) points; 2) goal difference; 3) number of goals scored.
(C) Champions; (P) Promoted; (R) Relegated

== Results grid ==
Home \ Away	AFT	KFF	HUG	ÍR	L/D	LRE	NJA	SEL	STJ	TIN
Afturelding		5–0	1–3	0–3	2–1	3–5	2–1	6–2	0–0	5–0
Fjarðabyggð	5–0		1–3	2–0	1–1	2–1	0–0	1–3	1–1	4–0
Huginn	1–1	2–3		2–1	7–1	1–2	0–3	3–1	3–5	1–1
Íþróttafélag Reykjavíkur	3–2	1–1	2–1		1–5	1–3	0–4	1–1	0–2	2–2
Leiftur/Dalvík	2–2	0–3	1–1	0–3		0–2	1–1	0–1	2–6	2–1
Leiknir R.	3–2	1–1	2–2	1–1	4–0		3–2	1–0	2–2	4–0
Njarðvík	1–1	0–2	5–1	3–1	1–0	1–2		2–1	2–1	2–1
Selfoss	2–0	2–3	3–2	0–3	2–1	1–0	1–3		0–1	3–0
Stjarnan	3–1	3–1	2–1	2–2	5–0	1–2	3–2	3–3		1–2
Tindastóll	0–2	1–0	2–1	1–2	2–6	1–0	1–1	0–1	1–1	

Updated to match(es) played on 10 September 2005. Source: ksi.is (in Icelandic)
Legend: Blue = home team win; Yellow = draw; Red = away team win.

== Season statistics ==
=== Top goalscorers ===
Two players, Afturelding midfielder Þorvaldur Árnason and Stjarnan forward Guðjón Baldvinsson, each scored 14 league goals in the 2005 2. deild season.

Name	Goals	Club
Þorvaldur Árnason	14	Afturelding
Guðjón Baldvinsson	14	Stjarnan
Marjan Cekic	10	Fjarðabyggð
Dragoslav Stojanovic	10	Stjarnan
Jóhann Björn Valsson	8	Afturelding
Mikael Nikulásson	8	Huginn
Atli Heimisson	7	Afturelding
Helgi Pétur Jóhannsson	7	Leiknir R.
Ómar Valdimarsson	7	Selfoss

=== Scoring ===
- Biggest home win: 6 goals
  - Huginn 7–1 Leiftur/Dalvík (6 August 2005)
- Biggest away win: 4 goals
  - ÍR 0–4 Njarðvík (27 May 2005)
  - ÍR 1–5 Leiftur/Dalvík (11 June 2005)
  - Leiftur/Dalvík 2–6 Stjarnan (30 June 2005)
  - Tindastóll 2–6 Leiftur/Dalvík (7 July 2005)
- Highest scoring game: 8 goals
  - Huginn 7–1 Leiftur/Dalvík (6 August 2005)
  - Afturelding 6–2 Selfoss (10 September 2005)
  - Leiftur/Dalvík 2–6 Stjarnan (30 June 2005)
  - Tindastóll 2–6 Leiftur/Dalvík (7 July 2005)
  - Afturelding 3–5 Leiknir R. (21 July 2005)
  - Huginn 3–5 Stjarnan (20 August 2005)
- Most team home goals scored: 24 – Afturelding
- Fewest team home goals scored: 8 – Leiftur/Dalvík
- Most team away goals: 19 – Stjarnan
- Fewest team away goals: 7 – Tindastóll

=== Discipline ===
- Most yellow cards (team): 40 – Afturelding
- Most yellow cards (player): 6
  - Björn Sigurbjörnsson (Afturelding)
  - Ómar Freyr Rafnsson (Huginn)
- Most red cards (team): 7 – Leiftur/Dalvík
- Most red cards (player): 2
  - Guðmundur Kristinn Kristinsson (Leiftur/Dalvík)

== Awards ==
=== Team of the year ===

KSÍ 2. deild Team of the Year

The KSÍ selected a team of the year, which consisted of 11 players and 5 substitutes.

Goalkeeper
Gísli Eyland Sveinsson (Tindastóll)
Defenders
Bjarki Már Árnason (Tindastóll), Ómar Valdimarsson (Selfoss), Snorri Már Jónsson (Njarðvík), Steinarr Guðmundsson (Leiknir R.)
Midfielders
Goran Lukic (Stjarnan), Haukur Gunnarsson (Leiknir R.), Sverrir Þór Sverrisson (Njarðvík), Vigfús Arnar Jósepsson (Leiknir R.)
Strikers
Guðjón Baldvinsson (Stjarnan), Dragoslav Stojanovic (Stjarnan)
Substitutes
Atli Knútsson (GK, Stjarnan), Gunnar Jarl Jónsson (DF, Leiknir R.), Simon Karkov (MF, Leiknir R.), Arilíus Marteinsson (MF, Selfoss), Jakob Spangsberg (FW, Leiknir R.)

=== Individual awards ===
Award	Winner	Club
Player of the Year	Guðjón Baldvinsson	Stjarnan
Young Player of the Year	Guðjón Baldvinsson	Stjarnan
Manager of the Year	Garðar Ásgeirsson	Leiknir R.
