= 2006 2. deild karla =

2. deild karla
- Season: 2006
- Champions: Fjarðabyggð
- Promoted: Njarðvík, Reynir Sandgerði
- Relegated: Huginn
- Matches played: 90
- Goals scored: 303 (3.37 per match)
- Top goalscorer: Adolf Sveinsson (13)
- Biggest home win: Njarðvík 10–0 Sindri (28 June 2006)
- Biggest away win: Sindri 0–6 Selfoss (24 June 2006)

The 2. deild karla is the third tier of men's football in the Icelandic football league system, and the 2006 season was the 41st edition of the tournament. Fjarðabyggð won the league and were subsequently promoted to the 1. deild karla for the 2007 campaign. Njarðvík and Reynir Sandgerði, also won promotion after finishing second and third respectively. However, Huginn were relegated to the 3. deild karla after finishing bottom of the league.

== Clubs ==
Location of clubs in the 2007 2. deild karla

Club name	Location	Stadium
Afturelding	Mosfellsbær	Varmárvöllur
Fjarðabyggð	Fjarðabyggð	Eskifjarðarvöllur
Reynir Sandgerði	Sandgerði	Sandgerðivöllur
ÍR	Reykjavík	ÍR-völlur
KS/Leiftir	Ólafsfjörður	Ólafsfjarðarvöllur
Huginn	Seyðisfjörður	Seyðisfjarðarvöllur
Njarðvík	Njarðvík	Njarðvíkurvöllur
Selfoss	Selfoss	Selfossvöllur
Sindri	Höfn	Mánavöllur
Völsungur	Húsavík	Húsavíkurvöllur

== League table ==
Pos	Team	Pld	W	D	L	GF	GA	GD	Pts	Promotion or relegation
1	Fjarðabyggð (C, P)	18	14	2	2	39	12	+27	44	Promotion to 2007 1. deild karla
2	Njarðvík (P)	18	13	4	1	46	13	+33	43	Promotion to 2007 1. deild karla
3	Reynir S. (P)	18	9	5	4	37	18	+19	32	Promotion to 2007 1. deild karla
4	Selfoss	18	7	6	5	26	18	+8	27	
5	ÍR	18	8	3	7	36	32	+4	27	
6	Völsungur	18	6	4	8	24	32	−8	22	
7	Afturelding	18	5	3	10	27	41	−14	18	
8	KS/Leiftur	18	4	4	10	24	34	−10	16	
9	Sindri	18	3	3	12	19	60	−41	12	
10	Huginn (R)	18	2	4	12	25	43	−18	10	Relegation to 2007 3. deild karla

Updated to match(es) played on 9 September 2006. Source: 2006 2. deild karla (in Icelandic)
Rules for classification: 1) points; 2) goal difference; 3) number of goals scored.
(C) Champions; (P) Promoted; (R) Relegated

== Results grid ==
Each team played the other nine teams both home and away, resulting in a total of 90 matches.

Home \ Away	AFT	KFF	HUG	ÍR	KSL	NJA	REY	SEL	SIH	VÖL
Afturelding		1–5	1–1	2–0	1–4	1–2	1–4	2–3	5–1	3–0
Fjarðabyggð	4–1		1–0	2–1	3–0	1–0	1–0	0–0	4–0	3–0
Huginn	0–2	2–1		3–1	2–3	1–3	1–4	1–1	2–2	1–3
Íþróttafélag Reykjavíkur	4–1	1–2	3–2		1–1	2–2	0–0	2–0	3–1	
KS/Leiftur	1–2	1–3	3–1	4–5		0–1	1–1	0–1	2–1	1–1
Njarðvík	5–1	1–0	5–3	1–0	2–1		3–0	2–0	10–0	3–0
Reynir S.	3–0	1–2	4–2	2–3	4–1	1–1		2–0	6–0	1–1
Selfoss	1–1	1–1	1–1	2–0	3–0	0–3	0–0		4–1	0–2
Sindri	1–0	1–4	2–0	1–6	1–1	1–1	1–3	0–6		4–1
Völsungur	2–2	1–2	3–2	2–3	1–0	1–1	0–1	0–3	2–1	

Updated to match(es) played on 9 September 2006. Source: 2006 2. deild karla (in Icelandic)
Legend: Blue = home team win; Yellow = draw; Red = away team win.

== Top goalscorers ==
Rank	Player	Club	Goals
1	Adolf Sveinsson	Reynir S.	13
2	Ragnar Hauksson	KS/Leiftur	10
2	Jeppe Opstrup	Huginn	10
4	Marjan Cekic	Fjarðabyggð	9
4	Aron Smárason	Njarðvík	9
6	Eyþór Guðnason	Njarðvík	8
7	Þorvaldur Guðmundsson	ÍR	7
7	Guðmundur Steingrímsson	Völsungur	7
7	Guðfinnur Ómarsson	ÍR	7
7	Elmar Sigþórsson	Fjarðabyggð	7

== Awards ==
=== Player of the year ===
The official 2. deild player of the year for 2006 was the Njarðvík defender Gestur Gylfason. The 37-year-old was a new signing for the 2006 season and his experience was a key factor in helping his team to achieve promotion to the 1. deild.

=== Young player of the year ===
Atli Heimisson, the 19-year-old Afturelding striker, was awarded the young player of the year award for 2006. He scored five goals in eleven matches during his second season of senior league football.

=== Manager of the year ===
Fjarðabyggð coach Þorvaldur Örlygsson was named 2. deild manager of the year for 2006. After being appointed in autumn 2005, he led the team to promotion during his first full campaign in charge, with his side losing only two matches in the league.

=== Team of the year ===

KSÍ 2. deild Team of the Year

The KSÍ also selected a team of the year, which included the best 11 players and 5 substitutes.

Goalkeeper
Albert Sævarsson (Njarðvík)
Defenders
Kristinn Björnsson (Njarðvík), Haukur Sigurbergsson (Fjarðabyggð), Andri Albertsson (Fjarðabyggð), Gestur Gylfason (Njarðvík)
Midfielders
Guðfinnur Ómarsson (ÍR), Guðni Erlendsson (Njarðvík), Ólafur Jónsson (Reynir Sandgerði), Sverrir Sverrisson (Njarðvík)
Forwards
Jeppe Opstrup (Huginn), Adolf Sveinsson (Reynir Sandgerði)
Substitutes
Srdjan Rajkovic (Fjarðabyggð), Jóhann Benediktsson (Fjarðabyggð), Grétar Ómarsson (Fjarðabyggð), Marteinn Guðjónsson (Njarðvík), Ragnar Hauksson (KS/Leiftur)
