= 1977 2. deild karla =

Icelandic football league season

The 1977 season of 2. deild karla was the 12th season of third-tier football in Iceland.

== Group A ==
Pos	Team	Played	Points	Notes
1	Leiknir R.	8	15	Advanced to final round
2	Afturelding	8	13	
3	Þór Þ.	8	6	
4	USVS	8	4	
5	Hekla	8	2	

== Group B ==
Pos	Team	Played	Points	Notes
1	Grindavík	10	16	Advanced to final round
2	Víðir	10	13	
3	ÍK	10	10	
4	Stjarnan	10	10	
5	Njarðvík	10	9	
6	ÍR	10	2	

== Group C ==
Pos	Team	Played	Points	Notes
1	Fylkir	8	15	Advanced to final round
2	Grótta	8	8	
3	Bolungarvík	8	8	
4	Léttir	8	6	
5	Óðinn	8	3	

== Group D ==
Pos	Team	Played	Points	Notes
1	Tindastóll	10	17	Advanced to final round
2	Snæfell	10	12	
3	Víkingur Ó.	10	11	
4	HSS	10	10	
5	USAH	10	6	
6	Skallagrímur	10	4	

== Group E ==
Pos	Team	Played	Points	Notes
1	KS	10	16	Advanced to final round
2	Leiftur	10	12	
3	Árroðinn	10	12	
4	Höfðstrendingur	10	10	
5	Magni	10	9	
6	Dagsbrún	10	1	

== Group F ==
Pos	Team	Played	Points	Notes
1	Austri	12	19	Advanced to final round
2	Einherji	12	18	
3	Hrafnkell Freysgoði	12	15	
4	Huginn	12	12	
5	Leiknir F.	12	11	
6	Sindri	12	7	
7	Höttur	12	2	

== Final round ==
=== Group A ===
Pos	Team	Pld	W	D	L	GF	GA	GD	Pts	Promotion
1	Fylkir	4	2	2	0	6	3	+3	6	Promoted
2	KS	4	1	2	1	5	4	+1	4	
3	Tindastóll	2	0	0	2	0	4	−4	0	

=== Group B ===
Pos	Team	Pld	W	D	L	GF	GA	GD	Pts	Promotion
1	Austri	4	2	1	1	7	3	+4	5	Promoted
2	Leiknir R.	4	2	1	1	8	7	+1	5	
3	Grindavík	4	1	0	3	7	12	−5	2	

=== Promoted teams ===
Both Fylkir and Austri won promotion to the 1978 1. deild karla. No final took place, with Fylkir declared champions.
