= Bjarni Ólafur Eiríksson =

Icelandic footballer (born 1982)

Personal information
- Date of birth: 28 March 1982 (age 44)
- Place of birth: Iceland
- Height: 1.91 m (6 ft 3 in)
- Position: Left back

Youth career
- Valur

Senior career*
Years	Team	Apps	(Gls)
2000–2005	Valur	92	(5)
2005–2007	Silkeborg IF	41	(0)
2007–2009	Valur	52	(3)
2010–2012	Stabæk	87	(4)
2013–2019	Valur	139	(9)
2020	ÍBV	20	(1)

International career
2003	Iceland U-21	2	(0)
2005–2012	Iceland	21	(0)
- * Club domestic league appearances and goals

Bjarni Ólafur Eiríksson (born 28 March 1982) is an Icelandic retired football defender.

== Career ==
He signed for Stabæk Fotball, 2008 winner of the Norwegian Tippeligaen in February 2010 after one week on trial. Stabæk manager Jan Jönsson was highly impressed by the strong left footed defender. After the 2012 season, he rejected having his contract renewed. He rejoined local team Valur before the 2013 season.

He made 21 caps for the Iceland national football team.

== Career statistics ==
Season	Club	Division	League		Cup		Total	
Season	Club	Division	Apps	Goals	Apps	Goals	Apps	Goals
2000	Valur	1. deild karla	3	1	0	0	3	1
2001	Valur	Úrvalsdeild	18	0	2	0	20	0
2002	Valur	1. deild karla	18	2	2	0	20	2
2003	Valur	Úrvalsdeild	17	0	3	1	20	1
2004	Valur	1. deild karla	18	1	2	0	20	1
2005	Valur	Úrvalsdeild	18	1	5	0	23	1
2005–06	Silkeborg IF	Danish Superliga	13	0	0	0	13	0
2006–07	Silkeborg IF	Danish Superliga	28	0	0	0	28	0
2007	Valur	Úrvalsdeild	9	0	1	0	10	0
2008	Valur	Úrvalsdeild	22	2	3	1	25	3
2009	Valur	Úrvalsdeild	21	1	3	1	24	2
2010	Stabæk	Tippeligaen	29	1	3	0	32	1
2011	Stabæk	Tippeligaen	30	1	1	0	31	1
2012	Stabæk	Tippeligaen	28	2	3	0	31	2
2013	Valur	Úrvalsdeild	20	2	1	0	21	2
2014	Valur	Úrvalsdeild	22	1	1	0	23	1
2015	Valur	Úrvalsdeild	19	1	5	1	24	2
2016	Valur	Úrvalsdeild	20	0	6	0	26	0
2017	Valur	Úrvalsdeild	20	5	3	0	23	5
2018	Valur	Úrvalsdeild	12	0	3	1	15	1
Career Total			385	21	47	5	432	26
