= 2001 2. deild karla =

Icelandic football league season

The 2001 season of 2. deild karla was the 36th season of third-tier football in Iceland.

== League table ==
Pos	Team	Pld	W	D	L	GF	GA	GD	Pts	Promotion or relegation
1	Haukar (C, P)	18	14	3	1	61	15	+46	45	Promoted to 2002 1. deild karla
2	Sindri (P)	18	12	2	4	29	9	+20	38	Promoted to 2002 1. deild karla
3	Afturelding (Note: Afturelding promoted due to the merger of 1. deild clubs Dalvík and Leiftur) (P)	18	11	4	3	41	20	+21	37	Promoted to 2002 1. deild karla
4	Selfoss	18	8	4	6	35	25	+10	28	
5	Léttir	18	7	2	9	31	39	−8	23	
6	Skallagrímur	18	7	2	9	31	44	−13	23	
7	Víðir	18	5	4	9	23	33	−10	19	
8	Leiknir R.	18	4	6	8	26	29	−3	18	
9	Nökkvi (R)	18	3	4	11	21	40	−19	13	Relegated to 2002 3. deild karla
10	KÍB (R)	18	3	1	14	27	71	−44	10	Relegated to 2002 3. deild karla

Rules for classification: 1) points; 2) goal difference; 3) number of goals scored.
(C) Champions; (P) Promoted; (R) Relegated

== Top scorers ==
Scorer	Goals	Team
(Iceland) Magnús Ólafsson	23	Haukar
(Iceland) Pétur Jónsson	13	KÍB
(Iceland) Engilbert Friðfinnsson	12	Léttir
(Iceland) Ómar Bendtsen	9	Haukar
(Iceland) Valdimar K. Sigurðsson	9	Skallagrímur
(Iceland) Róbert Arnarson	8	Leiknir
(Iceland) Ásbjörn Jónsson	8	Afturelding
(Iceland) Tómas Ellert Tómasson	8	Selfoss
