= 1998 2. deild karla =

Icelandic football league season

The 1998 season of 2. deild karla was the 33rd season of third-tier football in Iceland.

== League table ==
Pos	Team	Pld	W	D	L	GF	GA	GD	Pts	Promotion or relegation
1	Víðir (C, P)	18	15	1	2	54	19	+35	46	Promoted to 1999 1. deild karla
2	Dalvík (P)	18	9	6	3	40	20	+20	33	Promoted to 1999 1. deild karla
3	Leiknir R.	18	9	5	4	34	20	+14	32	
4	Tindastóll	18	8	4	6	36	30	+6	28	
5	KS	18	7	5	6	27	33	−6	26	
6	Völsungur	18	7	2	9	35	39	−4	23	
7	Ægir	18	6	2	10	40	44	−4	20	
8	Selfoss	18	5	4	9	38	42	−4	19	
9	Reynir S. (R)	18	3	5	10	32	42	−10	14	Relegated to 1999 3. deild karla
10	Fjölnir (R)	18	3	2	13	17	64	−47	11	Relegated to 1999 3. deild karla

Rules for classification: 1) points; 2) goal difference; 3) number of goals scored.
(C) Champions; (P) Promoted; (R) Relegated

== Top scorers ==
Scorer	Goals	Team
(Iceland) Erlendur Þór Gunnarsson	18	Ægir
(Iceland) Sigurður Valur Árnason	16	Reynir S.
(Iceland) Grétar Einarsson	16	Víðir
(Iceland) Jóhann Georg Möller	12	KS
(Iceland) Kári Jónsson	12	Víðir
(Iceland) Arngrímur Arnarsson	11	Völsungur
(Iceland) Hlynur Jóhannsson	11	Víðir
(Iceland) Tómas Ellert Tómasson	11	Selfoss
(Iceland) Örvar Eiríksson	10	Dalvík
