= Sigurvin Ólafsson =

Icelandic footballer

Personal information
- Full name: Sigurvin Ólafsson
- Date of birth: 18 July 1976 (age 50)
- Place of birth: Vestmannaeyjar, Iceland
- Height: 1.80 m (5 ft 11 in)
- Position: Midfielder

Senior career*
Years	Team	Apps	(Gls)
1993–1994	ÍBV	1	(0)
1994–1997	VfB Stuttgart II	55	(11)
1997–1999	ÍBV	18	(6)
1999–2000	Fram	27	(6)
2000–2005	KR	62	(18)
2005–2008	FH	23	(4)
2008–2011	Grótta	31	(13)
2012	Fylkir	4	(0)
2012	→ SR (loan)	5	(1)
2013	KV	8	(3)
2014	KFS	6	(1)

International career
1991	Iceland U17	7	(2)
1993–1994	Iceland U19	10	(5)
1995–1997	Iceland U21	18	(5)
1997–2006	Iceland	7	(0)
- * Club domestic league appearances and goals as of 11 August 2013

Sigurvin Ólafsson (born 18 July 1976) is an Icelandic retired footballer who played as a midfielder. Between 1997 and 2006, he won seven caps for the Iceland national football team. During his career he has won the Úrvalsdeild, the top division in Icelandic football, on five occasions with three clubs, and the Icelandic Cup in 2007.

== Club career ==
Sigurvin began his career with ÍBV and he made his league debut for the club at the age of 16, coming on as a substitute for Steingrímur Jóhannesson in the 2–2 draw with FH on 10 June 1993. He made the bench several times during the 1993 season, but did not make any further first-team appearances. The following year, Sigurvin joined German Oberliga side VfB Stuttgart II. He did not play any matches during his first season with the club, but made 55 appearances over the next two campaigns, scoring 11 goals during that time. On 24 May 1997, he returned to ÍBV and went on to score 5 goals in 14 league games as the team was crowned champions of the Úrvalsdeild. He then made only four appearances during the 1998 campaign as the side won the Icelandic league for the second consecutive year.

In April 1999, Sigurvin joined Reykjavík-based club Fram. He made his debut on 22 July 1999, scoring his team's goal in the 1–3 defeat to Grindavík. During his two seasons with Fram, he made a total of 27 league appearances and scored 6 goals. In March 2000, he had a trial with English club Stoke City, but no offer of a permanent deal was made. On 24 November 2000, Sigurvin was signed by league champions KR. He played his first match for the club in the opening fixture of the 2001 campaign, a 0–1 defeat away at Fylkir. The team started the season disappointingly, losing three of their first four games. Sigurvin netted his first goal for KR in the 2–4 loss to Valur on 25 June 2001, and went on to score twice more during the season as the team ended the campaign in seventh place. During the 2002 season, he scored seven goals in 12 league matches as KR were crowned Úrvalsdeild champions. He went on to score twice in 10 appearances the following campaign as the team successfully defended their league title. Sigurvin spent a total of five seasons with KR, during which time he played 75 first-team games and scored 21 goals. It was announced in October 2005 that he would not be offered a new contract by the club, and that six other clubs were interested in signing him.

Sigurvin signed for Icelandic champions FH in October 2005. On 30 July 2006 he netted the winning goal in a 1–0 away win over ÍA which put the team 12 points clear at the top of the table. He played 14 matches in total during the 2006 season, helping the side to their third consecutive Úrvalsdeild championship. He made nine appearances the following campaign, scoring twice. Sigurvin was offered a new contract by FH at the end of the 2007 season but he rejected it, announcing that he was considering retiring from football in order to spend more time with his family and concentrate on his career as a lawyer. He confirmed on 9 May 2008 that he would not play football during the 2008 season after failing to find his form over the winter break. Nevertheless, the following week he joined newly promoted 2. deild club Grótta.

Sigurvin played only five matches during his first season with Grótta as the club secured their 2. deild status with a seventh-place finish. He became an integral part of the team the following campaign, however, scoring 12 goals in 18 league matches as the side won the division and promotion to the 1. deild. His form during the 2009 campaign led to him being named the 2. deild Player of the Year and he was one of three Grótta players selected in the Team of the Year, along with fellow former Iceland international Kristján Finnbogason. Sigurvin revealed he had enjoyed playing in a lower division more than playing top-tier football due to the relaxed nature of the league. However, while stating his intention to train with Grótta the following season, he would not commit to extending his playing career. He remained contracted to the club for the following two seasons, but played just nine more first-team matches. Sigurvin made his final league appearance for Grótta on 2 June 2011, coming on as a substitute for Andri Björn Sigurðsson in the 1–0 win against BÍ/Bolungarvík.

On 14 May 2012, he signed for Úrvalsdeild side Fylkir, but was immediately loaned to 3. deild outfit SR in order to regain match fitness. He made his debut for SR in the 2–4 defeat to ÍH on 5 June 2012. Sigurvin played five league matches for SR during a two-month loan spell, scoring on his final appearance in the 2–7 home defeat to ÍH on 19 July 2012. He returned to Fylkir the following day for the remainder of the season.

== International career ==
Sigurvin has represented Iceland at all levels from under-17 to the senior team. He made his debut for the under-17 side on 7 August 1991, and scored on debut in a 1–1 draw with Finland. He played a total of seven matches for the team, scoring twice. During the 1993 and 1994 seasons, Sigurvin played 10 matches for the under-19 team. He scored twice in both the 7–0 win against Estonia on 5 October 1993 and the 5–0 victory over China on 3 April 1994. Between 1995 and 1997, he made 18 appearances for the Iceland under-21s, for whom he scored five goals.

On 27 July 1997, Sigurvin won his first senior international cap, coming on as a substitute for Sverrir Sverrison in the 1–0 win over the Faroe Islands. It was more than three years until he was selected again for the national team, when he earned his first start for Iceland in the 1–2 friendly defeat to Uruguay on 11 January 2001. He started again two days later in the 3–0 victory against India. He played three more international matches over the following 14 months, all of which ended in defeat for Iceland. Following a spell of more than four years away from the national team, Sigurvin was recalled for the friendly against Spain on 15 August 2006. He made his final Iceland appearance in the goalless draw, coming on as a late replacement for Arnar Viðarsson.

== Career statistics ==
As of 25 September 2012.

Club performance
Club	Division	Season	League		Cup^{[A]}		Europe^{[B]}		Total	
Club	Division	Season	Apps	Goals	Apps	Goals	Apps	Goals	Apps	Goals
ÍBV	Úrvalsdeild	1993	1	0	0	0	–	–	1	0
VfB Stuttgart II	Oberliga	1994–95	0	0	0	0	–	–	0	0
VfB Stuttgart II	Oberliga	1995–96	28	4	0	0	–	–	28	4
VfB Stuttgart II	Oberliga	1996–97	27	7	0	0	–	–	27	7
ÍBV	Úrvalsdeild	1997	14	5	1	1	2	1	17	7
ÍBV	Úrvalsdeild	1998	4	1	0	0	–	–	4	1
Fram	Úrvalsdeild	1999	9	2	0	0	–	–	9	2
Fram	Úrvalsdeild	2000	18	4	0	0	–	–	18	4
KR	Úrvalsdeild	2001	15	3	2	1	–	–	17	4
KR	Úrvalsdeild	2002	12	7	1	0	–	–	13	7
KR	Úrvalsdeild	2003	10	2	4	1	0	0	14	3
KR	Úrvalsdeild	2004	10	2	3	0	0	0	13	2
KR	Úrvalsdeild	2005	15	4	3	1	–	–	18	5
FH	Úrvalsdeild	2006	14	2	2	0	4	1	20	3
FH	Úrvalsdeild	2007	9	2	5	1	4	1	18	4
Grótta	2. deild	2008	5	1	0	0	–	–	5	1
Grótta	2. deild	2009	18	12	2	1	–	–	20	13
Grótta	1. deild	2010	7	0	1	0	–	–	8	0
Grótta	1. deild	2011	1	0	0	0	–	–	1	0
Fylkir	Úrvalsdeild	2012	4	0	0	0	–	–	3	0
→ SR (loan)	3. deild B	2012	5	1	0	0	–	–	5	1
KV	2. deild	2013	8	3	0	0	–	–	8	3
KFS	4. deild B	2014	6	1	0	0	–	–	6	1
Total			240	63	24	6	10	3	274	72

A. Includes matches in the Icelandic Cup and Icelandic Super Cup.
B. Includes matches in the Cup Winners' Cup and qualifying stages of the UEFA Champions League.

== Honours ==
ÍBV

- Úrvalsdeild: 1997, 1998

KR

- Úrvalsdeild: 2002, 2003
- Icelandic Super Cup: 2003

FH

- Úrvalsdeild: 2006
- Icelandic Cup: 2007
- Icelandic Super Cup: 2007

Grótta

- 2. deild: 2009
