= 1998 1. deild karla =

Icelandic football league season

The 1998 season of 1. deild karla was the 44th season of second-tier football in Iceland.

== League table ==
Pos	Team	Pld	W	D	L	GF	GA	GD	Pts	Promotion or relegation
1	Breiðablik (C, P)	18	13	0	5	44	14	+30	39	Promoted to 1999 Úrvalsdeild
2	Víkingur R. (P)	18	10	4	4	30	18	+12	34	Promoted to 1999 Úrvalsdeild
3	FH	18	10	3	5	30	15	+15	33	
4	Fylkir	18	9	5	4	31	23	+8	32	
5	Skallagrímur	18	7	5	6	37	36	+1	26	
6	Stjarnan	18	7	5	6	18	18	0	26	
7	KA	18	7	4	7	24	28	−4	25	
8	KVA	18	7	3	8	32	31	+1	24	
9	Þór A. (R)	18	2	2	14	19	43	−24	8	Relegated to 1999 2. deild
10	HK (R)	18	2	1	15	19	58	−39	7	Relegated to 1999 2. deild

Rules for classification: 1) points; 2) goal difference; 3) number of goals scored.
(C) Champions; (P) Promoted; (R) Relegated

== Top scorers ==
Scorer	Goals	Team
(Iceland) Atli Kristjánsson	14	Breiðablik
(Iceland) Valdimar K. Sigurðsson	11	Skallagrímur
(Iceland) Hjörtur Hjartarson	10	Skallagrímur
(Iceland) Hörður Magnússon	10	FH
(Iceland) Höskuldur Þórhallsson	10	KA
(Iceland) Bjarki Pétursson	9	Breiðablik
(Iceland) Sumarliði Árnason	9	Víkingur R.
(Serbia and Montenegro) Boban Ristic	8	KVA
(Iceland) Brynjar Þór Gestsson	5	FH
(Iceland) Elmar Eiríksson	5	Þór A.
(Iceland) Guðmundur Sævarsson	5	FH
(Iceland) Ívar Sigurjónsson	5	Breiðablik
(Iceland) Ólafur Þórðarson	5	Fylkir
(Iceland) Steindór Elísson	5	HK
