= 1992 2. deild karla =

Icelandic football league season

The 1992 season of 2. deild karla was the 27th season of third-tier football in Iceland.

== League table ==
Pos	Team	Pld	W	D	L	GF	GA	GD	Pts	Promotion or relegation
1	Tindastóll (C, P)	18	15	2	1	53	23	+30	47	Promoted to 1993 1. deild karla
2	Þróttur N. (P)	18	10	4	4	42	32	+10	34	Promoted to 1993 1. deild karla
3	Grótta	18	9	4	5	31	24	+7	31	
4	Skallagrímur	18	8	4	6	42	29	+13	28	
5	Haukar	18	6	5	7	33	35	−2	23	
6	Magni	18	6	4	8	26	24	+2	22	
7	Völsungur	18	5	5	8	23	33	−10	20	
8	Dalvík	18	5	2	11	28	31	−3	17	
9	Ægir (R)	18	4	5	9	20	40	−20	17	Relegated to 1993 3. deild karla
10	KS (R)	18	3	3	12	21	48	−27	12	Relegated to 1993 3. deild karla

Rules for classification: 1) points; 2) goal difference; 3) number of goals scored.
(C) Champions; (P) Promoted; (R) Relegated
