= 1995 2. deild karla =

Icelandic football league season

The 1995 season of 2. deild karla was the 30th season of third-tier football in Iceland.

== League table ==
Pos	Team	Pld	W	D	L	GF	GA	GD	Pts	Promotion or relegation
1	Völsungur (C, P)	18	12	5	1	37	14	+23	41	Promoted to 1996 1. deild karla
2	Leiknir R. (P)	18	12	2	4	49	24	+25	38	Promoted to 1996 1. deild karla
3	Þróttur N.	18	11	0	7	35	52	−17	33	
4	Selfoss	18	9	1	8	38	41	−3	28	
5	Dalvík	18	6	9	3	32	22	+10	27	
6	Fjölnir	18	7	3	8	34	28	+6	24	
7	Ægir	18	7	2	9	30	35	−5	23	
8	Höttur	18	5	2	11	21	32	−11	17	
9	Haukar	18	4	1	13	23	59	−36	13	Relegated to 1996 3. deild karla
10	BÍ (R)	18	3	3	12	25	47	−22	12	Relegated to 1996 3. deild karla

Rules for classification: 1) points; 2) goal difference; 3) number of goals scored.
(C) Champions; (P) Promoted; (R) Relegated

== Top scorers ==
Scorer	Goals	Team
(Iceland) Róbert Arnþórsson	16	Leiknir R.
(Iceland) Steindór Elísson	13	Leiknir R.
(Iceland) Bjarni Sveinbjörnsson	11	Dalvík
(Iceland) Sævar Þór Gíslason	11	Selfoss
(Iceland) Guðmundur Gunnarsson	9	Ægir
