= 1999 2. deild karla =

Icelandic football league season

The 1999 season of 2. deild karla was the 34th season of third-tier football in Iceland.

== League table ==
Pos	Team	Pld	W	D	L	GF	GA	GD	Pts	Promotion or relegation
1	Tindastóll (C, P)	18	14	2	2	61	12	+49	44	Promoted to 2000 1. deild karla
2	Sindri (P)	18	9	7	2	28	7	+21	34	Promoted to 2000 1. deild karla
3	Selfoss	18	9	4	5	41	32	+9	31	
4	Þór A.	18	9	3	6	33	27	+6	30	
5	Leiknir R.	18	7	6	5	30	27	+3	27	
6	KS	18	8	2	8	19	20	−1	26	
7	HK	18	6	4	8	30	39	−9	22	
8	Léttir	18	4	4	10	27	47	−20	16	
9	Völsungur (R)	18	3	2	13	18	48	−30	11	Relegated to 2000 3. deild karla
10	Ægir (R)	18	1	6	11	22	50	−28	9	Relegated to 2000 3. deild karla

Rules for classification: 1) points; 2) goal difference; 3) number of goals scored.
(C) Champions; (P) Promoted; (R) Relegated

== Top scorers ==
Scorer	Goals	Team
(Iceland) Sverrir Þór Sverrisson	16	Tindastóll
(Iceland) Unnar Sigurðsson	12	Tindastóll
(Iceland) Engilbert Friðfinnsson	9	Léttir
(Iceland) Guðjón Þorvarðarson	9	Selfoss
(Iceland) Arnar Halldórsson	8	Leiknir R.
