= 2007 2. deild karla =

2. deild karla
- Season: 2007
- Champions: Haukar
- Promoted: Selfoss, KS/Leiftur
- Relegated: Sindri
- Matches played: 90
- Goals scored: 291 (3.23 per match)
- Top goalscorer: Sævar Þór Gíslason (20)
- Biggest home win: Selfoss 9–1 Sindri (21 July 2007)
- Biggest away win: Sindri 0–7 ÍR (27 July 2007)

The 2. deild karla is the third tier of men's football in the Icelandic football league system, and the 2007 season was the 42nd edition of the tournament. Haukar won the league, completing the whole season without losing a match, and were subsequently promoted to the 1. deild karla for the 2008 campaign. The second- and third-placed teams, UMF Selfoss and KS/Leiftur, also won promotion. UMF Sindri Höfn finished bottom of the league, having lost all of their away matches, and were relegated to the 3. deild karla.

== Clubs ==
Location of clubs in the 2007 2. deild karla

Ten clubs competed in the 2. deild in 2007. This was the last time the league was played in this format, as it was expanded to 12 teams the following year.

Club name	Location	Stadium
Afturelding	Mosfellsbær	Varmárvöllur
Haukar	Hafnarfjörður	Ásvellir
Höttur	Egilsstaðir	Vilhjálmsvöllur
ÍH	Hafnarfjörður	Kaplakrikavöllur
ÍR	Reykjavík	ÍR-völlur
KS/Leiftur	Ólafsfjörður	Ólafsfjarðarvöllur
Magni	Grenivík	Grenivíkurvöllur
Selfoss	Selfoss	Selfossvöllur
Sindri	Höfn	Mánavöllur
Völsungur	Húsavík	Húsavíkurvöllur

== League table ==
Pos	Team	Pld	W	D	L	GF	GA	GD	Pts	Promotion or relegation
1	Haukar (C, P)	18	12	6	0	46	16	+30	42	Promotion to 2008 1. deild karla
2	Selfoss (P)	18	11	3	4	39	17	+22	36	Promotion to 2008 1. deild karla
3	KS/Leiftur (P)	18	10	6	2	36	17	+19	36	Promotion to 2008 1. deild karla
4	ÍR	18	8	8	2	40	19	+21	32	
5	Afturelding	18	8	2	8	26	23	+3	26	
6	Höttur	18	7	2	9	25	28	−3	23	
7	Völsungur	18	7	2	9	22	26	−4	23	
8	ÍH	18	3	4	11	23	38	−15	13	
9	Magni	18	3	2	13	15	44	−29	11	
10	Sindri (R)	18	3	1	14	20	64	−44	10	Relegation to 2008 3. deild karla

Updated to match(es) played on 15 September 2007. Source: 2007 2. deild karla (in Icelandic)
Rules for classification: 1) points; 2) goal difference; 3) number of goals scored.
(C) Champions; (P) Promoted; (R) Relegated

== Results grid ==
Each team played the other nine teams both home and away, resulting in a total of 90 matches.

Home \ Away	AFT	HAU	HÖT	ÍH	ÍR	KSL	MAG	SEL	SIH	VÖL
Afturelding		1–2	3–0	0–2	1–3	1–2	1–0	0–2	2–0	1–0
Haukar	3–1		5–2	3–0	3–3	1–1	6–1	1–1	7–1	1–0
Höttur	1–0	0–1		2–2	1–2	2–2	1–0	0–1	3–1	4–1
Íþróttafélag Hafnarfjarðar	2–4	2–3	1–2		0–0	0–3	2–1	1–1	5–4	0–2
Íþróttafélag Reykjavíkur	2–2	1–1	3–1	3–1		2–0	1–2	2–1	7–0	2–2
KS/Leiftur	1–1	1–1	2–1	3–2	1–1		4–0	0–2	5–2	3–0
Magni	0–4	0–2	1–3	1–1	0–0	0–1		1–4	3–2	2–5
Selfoss	3–1	0–2	2–1	3–2	3–1	0–0	3–0		9–1	1–2
Sindri	0–1	1–1	0–1	1–0	0–7	0–5	2–3	2–1		1–0
Völsungur	0–2	0–3	1–0	2–0	0–0	1–2	2–0	0–2	4–2	

Updated to match(es) played on 15 September 2007. Source: 2007 2. deild karla (in Icelandic)
Legend: Blue = home team win; Yellow = draw; Red = away team win.

== Top goalscorers ==
Rank	Player	Club	Goals
1	Sævar Þór Gíslason	Selfoss	20
2	Hilmar Rafn Emilsson	Haukar	11
2	Elías Ingi Árnason	ÍR	11
4	Ásgeir Þór Ingólfsson	Haukar	10
4	Ragnar Haukur Hauksson	KS/Leiftur	10
6	Denis Curic	Höttur	9
7	Magnús Ólafsson	ÍR	8
8	Hilmar Geir Eiðsson	Haukar	7
8	Þorsteinn Þorvaldsson	Magni	7
10	Fannar Eðvaldsson	ÍH	6
10	Hallur Kristján Ásgeirsson	ÍH	6
10	Arilíus Marteinsson	Selfoss	6
10	Béres Ferenc	KS/Leiftur	6

== Awards ==
=== Player of the year ===
The 2. deild player of the year for 2007, selected by the KSÍ, was Selfoss striker Sævar Þór Gíslason. He returned to the club in January 2007, having left 10 years previously to join ÍR. Gíslason was the league's top scorer with 20 goals in 18 matches, including a hat-trick against Magni on the final day of the season.

=== Young player of the year ===
Ásgeir Þór Ingólfsson, left-midfielder for Haukar, was awarded the young player of the year award for 2007. Aged just 16 at the start of the season, he scored 10 goals from midfield in his debut campaign in senior football. His performances earned him a call up to the national under-19 side in September.

=== Manager of the year ===
Ragnar Hauksson, player-manager of KS/Leiftur, was named 2. deild coach of the year for 2007. His team had been predicted to finish seventh in the league before the start of the season, but they exceeded expectations and sealed promotion to the 1. deild with a final-day win against Völsungur. His 10 goals for the club during the 2007 season also led to him being selected in the team of the year.

=== Team of the year ===

KSÍ 2. deild Team of the Year

The KSÍ also selected a team of the year, which included the best 11 players and 5 substitutes.

Goalkeeper
Þorvaldur Þorsteinsson (KS/Leiftur)
Defenders
Arnar Hallsson (ÍR), Þórhallur Dan Jóhannsson (Haukar), Dusan Ivkovic (KS/Leiftur), Sandor Forzis (KS/Leiftur)
Midfielders
Hilmar Geir Eiðsson (Haukar), Goran Lukic (Haukar), Denis Curic (Höttur), Ásgeir Þór Ingólfsson (Haukar)
Forwards
Sævar Þór Gíslason (Selfoss), Ragnar Hauksson (KS/Leiftur)
Substitutes
Amir Mehica (Haukar), Jón Sveinsson (Selfoss), Kristján Ómar Björnsson (Haukar), Béres Ferenc (KS/Leiftur), Hilmar Rafn Emilsson (Haukar)
