= 2000 2. deild karla =

Icelandic football league season

The 2000 season of 2. deild karla was the 35th season of third-tier football in Iceland.

== League table ==
Pos	Team	Pld	W	D	L	GF	GA	GD	Pts	Promotion or relegation
1	Þór A. (C, P)	18	17	1	0	58	14	+44	52	Promoted to 2001 1. deild karla
2	KS (P)	18	10	4	4	27	20	+7	34	Promoted to 2001 1. deild karla
3	Selfoss	18	9	3	6	46	25	+21	30	
4	Afturelding	18	8	4	6	33	30	+3	28	
5	Víðir	18	8	3	7	27	22	+5	27	
6	Leiknir R.	18	7	3	8	40	31	+9	24	
7	Léttir	18	5	3	10	27	49	−22	18	
8	KÍB	18	5	1	12	25	49	−24	16	
9	HK (R)	18	3	5	10	26	41	−15	14	Relegated to 2001 3. deild karla
10	KVA (R)	18	3	3	12	28	56	−28	12	Relegated to 2001 3. deild karla

Rules for classification: 1) points; 2) goal difference; 3) number of goals scored.
(C) Champions; (P) Promoted; (R) Relegated

== Top scorers ==
Scorer	Goals	Team
(Iceland) Orri Freyr Hjaltalín	20	Þór A.
(Iceland) Ágúst Daði Guðmundsson	15	Leiknir R.
(Serbia and Montenegro) Marjan Cekic	13	KVA
(Iceland) Kjartan Þór Helgason	9	Selfoss
(Iceland) Sigurður Andrés Þorvarðarson	9	Selfoss
(Iceland) Brynjar Sverrisson	8	Leiknir
(Iceland) Ragnar Haukur Hauksson	8	KS
(Iceland) Pétur Heiðar Kristjánsson	8	Þór A.
(Iceland) Kristján Elí Örnólfsson	7	Þór A.
(Serbia and Montenegro) Goran Nikolic	7	Selfoss
