= 2003 2. deild karla =

Icelandic football league season

The 2003 season of 2. deild karla was the 38th season of third-tier football in Iceland.

== League table ==
Pos	Team	Pld	W	D	L	GF	GA	GD	Pts	Promotion or relegation
1	Völsungur (C, P)	18	15	1	2	63	25	+38	46	Promoted to 2004 1. deild karla
2	Fjölnir (P)	18	12	4	2	60	26	+34	40	Promoted to 2004 1. deild karla
3	Selfoss	18	11	2	5	40	23	+17	35	
4	Víðir	18	8	3	7	30	28	+2	27	
5	ÍR	18	8	2	8	35	34	+1	26	
6	Tindastóll	18	8	1	9	33	35	−2	25	
7	KS	18	6	5	7	32	38	−6	23	
8	KFS	18	5	4	9	37	47	−10	19	
9	Sindri (R)	18	1	5	12	29	44	−15	8	Relegated to 2004 3. deild karla
10	Léttir (R)	18	2	1	15	19	78	−59	7	Relegated to 2004 3. deild karla

Rules for classification: 1) points; 2) goal difference; 3) number of goals scored.
(C) Champions; (P) Promoted; (R) Relegated

== Top scorers ==
Scorer	Goals	Team
(Iceland) Sævar Gunnarsson	17	Sindri
(Serbia and Montenegro) Boban Jovic	14	Völsungur
(Iceland) Andri Valur Ívarsson	13	Völsungur
(Iceland) Davíð Þór Rúnarsson	13	Fjölnir
(Iceland) Ragnar Haukur Hauksson	12	KS
(Iceland) Ívar Björnsson	12	Fjölnir
(Iceland) Sindri Grétarsson	10	KFS
(Iceland) Kristmar Geir Björnsson	10	Tindastóll
(Iceland) Baldur Sigurðsson	10	Völsungur
