= 2010 1. deild karla =

2010 football season in Iceland

1. deild karla
- Season: 2010
- Matches: 132
- Goals: 408 (3.09 per match)
- Biggest home win: Þór A. 9-1 Fjarðabyggð
- Biggest away win: Grótta 1-6 Vikingur R.
- Highest scoring: Þór A. 9-1 Fjarðabyggð

The 2010 season of 1. deild karla is the 56th season of second-tier football in Iceland.

== Stadia and locations ==
Location of teams in the 1. deild karla 2010

Team	Location	Stadium	Stadium capacity
Fjarðabyggð	Fjarðabyggð	Eskifjarðarvöllur	1,000
Fjölnir	Reykjavík	Fjölnisvöllur	1,008
Grótta	Seltjarnarnes	Gróttuvöllur	1,500
HK	Kópavogur	Kópavogsvöllur	5,501
ÍA	Akranes	Akranesvöllur	2,780
ÍR	Reykjavík	ÍR-Völlur	800
KA	Akureyri	Akureyrarvöllur	1,770
Leiknir R.	Reykjavík	Leiknisvöllur	1,300
Njarðvík	Reykjanesbær	Njarðtaksvöllurinn	2,880
Vikingur R.	Reykjavík	Keppnisvöllur	1,249
Þór A.	Akureyri	Þórsvöllur	1,000
Þróttur R.	Reykjavík	Valbjarnarvöllur	5,478

== League table ==
Pos	Team	Pld	W	D	L	GF	GA	GD	Pts	Promotion or relegation
1	Víkingur Reykjavík (C, P)	22	15	3	4	46	23	+23	48	Promotion to Úrvalsdeild
2	Þór A. (P)	22	12	7	3	53	23	+30	43	Promotion to Úrvalsdeild
3	Leiknir R.	22	13	4	5	32	19	+13	43	
4	Fjölnir	22	12	4	6	42	28	+14	40	
5	ÍA	22	9	8	5	44	28	+16	35	
6	ÍR	22	8	6	8	31	38	−7	30	
7	Þróttur Reykjavík	22	8	5	9	32	37	−5	29	
8	HK	22	7	4	11	30	38	−8	25	
9	KA	22	6	6	10	29	43	−14	24	
10	Grótta	22	4	6	12	29	47	−18	18	
11	Fjarðabyggð (R)	22	4	5	13	26	47	−21	17	Relegation to 2011 2. deild
12	Njarðvík (R)	22	3	4	15	14	37	−23	13	Relegation to 2011 2. deild

Updated to match(es) played on 18 September 2010. Source: ksi.is (in Icelandic)
Rules for classification: 1) points; 2) goal difference; 3) number of goals scored.
(C) Champions; (P) Promoted; (R) Relegated

== Results ==
Each team play every opponent once home and away for a total of 22 matches.

Home \ Away	ÍA	KFF	FJÖ	GRÓ	ÍR	KAK	HK	LRE	NJA	ÞÓR	ÞRÓ	VÍK
ÍA		4–2	2–2	6–1	1–1	5–1	1–2	0–1	1–0	1–1	2–4	1–1
Fjarðabyggð	3–2		0–1	1–4	1–2	1–0	2–0	1–1	0–0	1–1	1–3	1–2
Fjölnir	1–1	2–1		1–0	4–0	3–2	0–2	4–3	3–0	2–0	3–0	2–2
Grótta	1–4	3–1	1–2		1–2	4–1	1–2	0–0	1–0	0–2	2–3	1–6
ÍR	0–3	4–1	0–2	2–2		2–1	2–1	2–1	5–1	0–3	1–1	0–4
KA	1–1	2–2	3–2	1–1	3–2		3–3	2–2	2–1	0–2	3–0	0–2
HK	0–2	0–2	1–0	2–2	0–0	0–1		2–2	4–1	3–2	0–1	2–1
Leiknir R.	1–0	1–0	1–3	2–1	2–0	3–0	1–0		2–0	1–0	2–1	2–0
Njarðvík	1–2	1–1	1–0	1–1	1–2	1–1	2–0	0–1		0–1	0–2	1–2
Þór A.	2–2	9–1	1–1	5–0	2–2	3–0	6–3	1–0	4–0		2–1	4–3
Þróttur Reykjavík	2–2	3–2	2–1	2–2	1–1	1–2	3–2	0–2	1–2	1–1		0–1
Víkingur Reykjavík	0–1	2–1	5–3	1–0	2–1	2–0	3–1	2–1	1–0	1–1	3–0	

Updated to match(es) played on 18 September 2010. Source: ksi.is (in Icelandic)
Legend: Blue = home team win; Yellow = draw; Red = away team win.

== Statistics ==
=== Top goalscorers ===
As of 18 September 2010.

Rank	Player	Club	Goals	Matches	Ratio
1	Aron Jóhannsson	Fjölnir	12	18	0.67
2	Ármann Pétur Ævarsson	Þór A.	12	21	0.57
3	Gary John Martin	ÍA	10	9	1.11
4	Aron Már Smárason	Fjarðabyggð	10	18	0.56
5	Pétur Georg Markan	Fjölnir	10	21	0.48
6	Helgi Sigurðsson	Víkingur R.	9	21	0.43
7	Andri Júlíusson	ÍA	8	17	0.47
8	Árni Freyr Guðnason	ÍR	8	19	0.42
8	Jóhann Helgi Hannesson	Þór A.	8	19	0.42
10	Aleksandar Linta	Þór A.	8	20	0.40
11	Kristján Páll Jónsson	Leiknir R.	8	22	0.36

- Aleksandar Linta scored 7 of his 8 goals from the penalty spot.
