= 1999 1. deild karla =

Icelandic football league season

The 1999 season of 1. deild karla was the 45th season of second-tier football in Iceland.

== League table ==
Pos	Team	Pld	W	D	L	GF	GA	GD	Pts	Promotion or relegation
1	Fylkir (C, P)	18	15	0	3	46	20	+26	45	Promoted to 2000 Úrvalsdeild
2	Stjarnan (P)	18	9	2	7	35	31	+4	29	Promoted to 2000 Úrvalsdeild
3	FH	18	8	4	6	41	31	+10	28	
4	ÍR	18	8	2	8	46	35	+11	26	
5	Dalvík	18	7	5	6	27	35	−8	26	
6	KA	18	6	5	7	24	24	0	23	
7	Skallagrímur	18	7	2	9	36	38	−2	23	
8	Þróttur R.	18	6	3	9	27	29	−2	21	
9	Víðir (R)	18	6	3	9	30	44	−14	21	Relegated to 2000 2. deild
10	KVA (R)	18	4	2	12	28	53	−25	14	Relegated to 2000 2. deild

Rules for classification: 1) points; 2) goal difference; 3) number of goals scored.
(C) Champions; (P) Promoted; (R) Relegated

== Top scorers ==
Scorer	Goals	Team
(Iceland) Hjörtur Hjartarson	18	Skallagrímur
(Iceland) Hörður Magnússon	15	FH
(Iceland) Sævar Þór Gíslason	12	ÍR
(Iceland) Atli Viðar Björnsson	11	Dalvík
(Iceland) Kári Jónsson	10	Víðir
(Iceland) Hreinn Hringsson	10	Þróttur R.
