= Hertz-völlurinn =

Stadium in Iceland

(Iceland) Hertz-völlurinn
- Interactive map of (Iceland) Hertz-völlurinn
- Location: Reykjavík, Iceland
- Coordinates: 64.1035498°N 21.8543743°W
- Capacity: 1,500

Tenants
- ÍR; Léttir

Hertz-völlurinn (lit. 'Hertz Field' (Note: völlurinn is the definite form of völlur, meaning "the field".) or more precisely 'Hertz Stadium') is a multi-use stadium in Reykjavík, Iceland. It is currently used mostly for football matches and is the home stadium of Íþróttafélag Reykjavíkur. Its capacity is around 1500.
