= 2011 Úrvalsdeild =

Úrvalsdeild
- Season: 2011
- Dates: 2 May – 1 October 2011
- Champions: KR Reykjavík; 25th title
- Relegated: Þór Akureyri; Víkingur R.
- Champions League: KR Reykjavík
- Europa League: FH; ÍBV; Þór Akureyri
- Matches: 132
- Goals: 401 (3.04 per match)
- Top goalscorer: Garðar Jóhannsson (15)
- Biggest home win: FH 7–2 Grindavik; Þór 6–1 Víkingur R. Stjarnan 5–0 Valur
- Biggest away win: Breiðablik 2–6 Víkingur R.
- Highest scoring: FH 7–2 Grindavik
- Longest winning run: FH, Valur (5 goals each)
- Longest unbeaten run: KR (16 games)
- Longest winless run: Víkingur R. (18 games)
- Longest losing run: Fylkir, Keflavík (4 games each)

The 2011 Úrvalsdeild (also known as the "Pepsi deild" for sponsorship reasons) is the 100th season of top-tier football in Iceland.The season began on 2 May 2011 and concluded on 1 October 2011. Breiðablik are the defending champions, having won their first league championship.

== Teams ==
A total of twelve teams will contest the league, including ten sides from the 2010 season and two promoted teams from the 1. deild karla.

Haukar and Selfoss were relegated from 2010 Úrvalsdeild after finishing the season in the bottom two places of the league table. Both teams were relegated having just achieved promotion the season before.

2010 1. deild karla champions Víkingur R. and runners-up Þór Akureyri secured direct promotion to the Úrvalsdeild.Víkingur returned to the Úrvalsdeild after a three-year absence while Þór return to the top league after an eight-year absence.

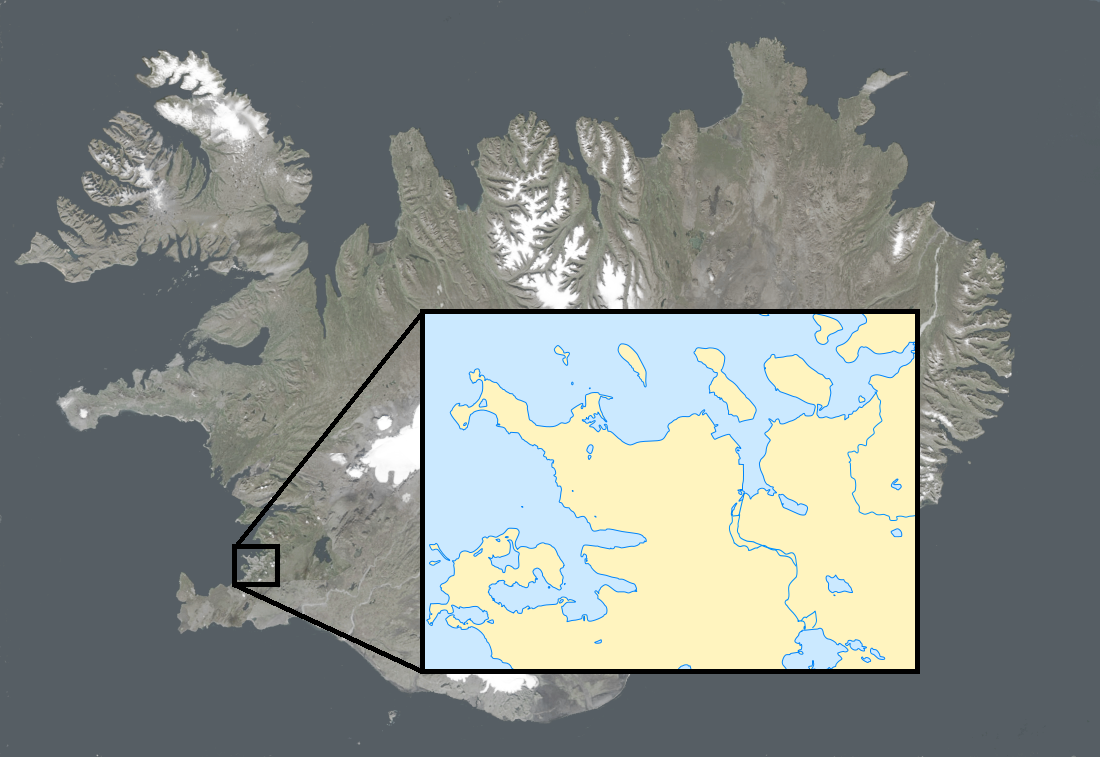

Team	Location	Stadium	Stadium capacity
Breiðablik	Kópavogur	Kópavogsvöllur	5,501
FH	Hafnarfjörður	Kaplakriki	6,738
Fram	Reykjavík	Laugardalsvöllur	15,427
Fylkir	Reykjavík	Fylkisvöllur	2,872
Grindavík	Grindavík	Grindavíkurvöllur	1,750
ÍBV	Vestmannaeyjar	Hásteinsvöllur	2,834
Keflavík	Keflavík	Nettóvöllurinn	4,957
KR	Reykjavík	KR-völlur	3,333
Stjarnan	Garðabær	Stjörnuvöllur	1,292
Valur	Reykjavík	Vodafonevöllurinn	3,000
Víkingur R.	Reykjavík	Víkin	1,249
Þór	Akureyri	Þórsvöllur	1,550

== League table ==
Pos	Team	Pld	W	D	L	GF	GA	GD	Pts	Qualification or relegation
1	KR (C)	22	13	8	1	44	22	+22	47	Qualification for the Champions League second qualifying round
2	FH	22	13	5	4	48	31	+17	44	Qualification for the Europa League first qualifying round
3	ÍBV	22	12	4	6	37	27	+10	40	Qualification for the Europa League first qualifying round
4	Stjarnan	22	10	7	5	51	35	+16	37	
5	Valur	22	10	6	6	28	23	+5	36	
6	Breiðablik	22	7	6	9	34	42	−8	27	
7	Fylkir	22	7	4	11	34	44	−10	25	
8	Keflavík	22	7	3	12	27	32	−5	24	
9	Fram	22	6	6	10	20	28	−8	24	
10	Grindavík	22	5	8	9	26	37	−11	23	
11	Þór Akureyri (Note: Þór qualified for the first qualifying round of UEFA Europa League as losing finalists of the 2011 VISA-bikar competition to Champions League-qualified KR.) (R)	22	6	3	13	28	41	−13	21	Europa League qualifying and relegation to 1. deild karla
12	Víkingur Reykjavík (R)	22	3	6	13	24	39	−15	15	Relegation to 1. deild karla

Source: ksi.is (in Icelandic)
Rules for classification: 1) points; 2) goal difference; 3) number of goals scored.
(C) Champions; (R) Relegated

=== Positions by round ===
Team ╲ Round	1	2	3	4	5	6	7	8	9	10	11	12	13	14	15	16	17	18	19	20	21	22
KR	3	4	1	1	1	1	1	1	1	1	1	1	1	1	1	1	1	1	1	1	1	1
FH	9	5	5	7	8	5	6	5	4	4	5	4	4	3	3	3	3	3	3	3	2	2
ÍBV	5	7	3	5	2	2	3	3	3	3	3	3	2	2	2	2	2	2	2	2	3	3
Stjarnan	11	10	8	3	4	7	5	6	5	5	4	5	5	5	5	5	5	5	5	5	4	4
Valur	5	1	2	6	3	3	2	2	2	2	2	2	3	4	4	4	4	4	4	4	5	5
Breiðablik	7	12	11	9	6	9	8	7	7	6	6	8	9	9	9	7	7	8	8	8	7	6
Fylkir	7	6	6	4	7	4	4	4	6	8	7	6	6	6	6	6	6	6	6	6	6	7
Keflavík	1	2	4	2	5	6	7	8	8	7	8	7	7	7	7	8	10	7	7	7	8	8
Fram	9	11	12	12	12	12	12	12	12	12	12	12	12	12	11	11	11	11	11	11	9	9
Grindavík	3	8	9	10	10	8	9	10	11	9	9	10	10	10	10	10	9	9	10	10	11	10
Þór A.	12	9	10	11	10	11	10	9	9	10	10	9	8	8	8	9	8	10	9	9	10	11
Víkingur Reykjavík	2	3	7	8	9	10	11	11	10	11	11	11	11	11	12	12	12	12	12	12	12	12

Leader
2012–13 UEFA Europa League first qualifying round
Relegation to 1. deild karla

Source: ksi.is

== Results ==
Each team play every opponent once home and away for a total of 22 matches.

Home \ Away	BRE	FRA	FYL	GRI	FH	ÍBV	KEF	KR	STJ	VAL	VÍK	ÞÓR
Breiðablik		1–1	3–1	2–1	0–1	1–2	2–1	2–3	4–3	1–1	2–6	4–1
Fram	1–0		0–0	1–1	1–2	0–2	1–0	1–2	2–5	3–1	2–1	0–1
Fylkir	1–2	0–0		2–3	3–5	1–3	2–1	0–3	2–3	2–1	2–1	1–1
Grindavík	1–1	1–2	1–4		1–3	2–0	0–2	0–3	2–2	0–2	0–0	4–1
FH	4–1	1–1	2–2	7–2		4–2	1–0	2–1	3–0	3–2	1–1	2–0
ÍBV	1–1	1–0	1–2	0–2	3–1		2–1	1–1	2–1	1–1	2–0	3–1
Keflavík	1–1	1–0	1–2	1–2	1–1	0–2		2–3	4–2	0–2	2–1	2–1
KR	4–0	2–1	3–2	1–1	2–0	2–2	1–1		1–1	1–1	3–2	3–1
Stjarnan	3–2	2–2	4–1	2–1	4–0	3–2	2–3	1–1		5–0	0–0	5–1
Valur	2–0	1–0	3–1	1–1	1–0	0–1	0–1	0–0	1–1		2–1	2–1
Víkingur Reykjavík	2–2	0–1	1–3	0–0	1–3	1–3	2–1	0–2	1–1	0–1		2–0
Þór A.	1–2	3–0	2–0	0–0	2–2	2–1	2–1	1–2	0–1	0–3	6–1	

Source: ksi.is (in Icelandic)
Legend: Blue = home team win; Yellow = draw; Red = away team win.

== Top goalscorers ==
Source ksi.net (in Icelandic)

Rank	Player	Club	Goals
1	(Iceland) Garðar Jóhannsson	Stjarnan	15
2	(Iceland) Atli Viðar Björnsson	FH	13
3	(Iceland) Halldór Orri Björnsson	Stjarnan	12
3	(Iceland) Kjartan Finnbogason	KR	12
5	(Iceland) Kristinn Steindórsson	Breiðablik	11
6	(Iceland) Matthías Vilhjálmsson	FH	10
6	(Iceland) Tryggvi Guðmundsson	ÍBV	10
8	(Iceland) Albert Brynjar Ingason	Fylkir	9
9	(Iceland) Guðjón Baldvinsson	KR	8
9	(Iceland) Guðjón Pétur Lýðsson	Valur	8
9	(Iceland) Sveinn Elías Jónsson	Þór	8
