= 2006 1. deild karla =

Icelandic football league season

The 2006 season of 1. deild karla was the 52nd season of second-tier football in Iceland.

== League table ==
Pos	Team	Pld	W	D	L	GF	GA	GD	Pts	Promotion or relegation
1	Fram (C, P)	18	13	2	3	32	14	+18	41	Promoted to 2007 Úrvalsdeild (Note: Due to the 1. deild karla expanding to 12 teams, 2 teams were promoted and only 1 relegated, with 3 teams being promoted from 2. deild karla.)
2	HK (P)	18	10	2	6	30	18	+12	32	Promoted to 2007 Úrvalsdeild
3	Fjölnir	18	8	5	5	23	15	+8	29	
4	Þróttur R.	18	9	2	7	21	18	+3	29	
5	Stjarnan	18	6	6	6	26	23	+3	24	
6	KA	18	6	3	9	22	25	−3	21	
7	Víkingur Ó.	18	4	7	7	16	22	−6	19	
8	Þór A.	18	5	4	9	16	38	−22	19	
9	Leiknir R.	18	4	6	8	21	25	−4	18	
10	Haukar (R)	18	4	5	9	20	29	−9	17	Relegated to 2007 2. deild

Source: rsssf.com
Rules for classification: 1) points; 2) goal difference; 3) number of goals scored.
(C) Champions; (P) Promoted; (R) Relegated

== Top scorers ==
Scorer	Goals	Team
(Iceland) Helgi Sigurðsson	13	Fram
(Iceland) Hreinn Hringsson	9	KA
(Iceland) Jónas Grani Garðarsson	8	Fram
(Iceland) Ómar Hákonarson	8	Fjölnir
(Iceland) Jón Þorgrímur Stefánsson	7	HK
(Iceland) Guðjón Baldvinsson	7	Stjarnan
(Iceland) Ólafur Valdimar Júlíusson	6	HK
(Iceland) Einar Örn Einarsson	6	Leiknir R.
(Iceland) Pétur Örn Svansson	6	Leiknir R.
(Iceland) Jónmundur Grétarsson	5	Haukar
(Iceland) Ómar Karl Sigurðsson	5	Haukar
(Iceland) Hörður Már Magnússon	5	HK
(Iceland) Halldór Arnar Hilmisson	5	Þróttur R.
