= Magni Fannberg Magnússon =

Icelandic football coach

Personal information
- Full name: Magni Fannberg Magnússon
- Date of birth: 12 August 1979 (age 47)
- Place of birth: Iceland
- Height: 1.82 m (6 ft 0 in)

Team information
- Current team: IFK Norrköping (sports director)

Senior career*
Years	Team	Apps	(Gls)
2003	Drangur	7	(0)
Total		7	(0)

Managerial career
- 2001: HK (assistant)
- 2003–2004: HK/Víkingur (assistant)
- 2006: Grindavík (assistant)
- 2006: Grindavík
- 2007–2008: Fjarðarbyggð
- 2011–2014: IF Brommapojkarna U19
- 2015: IF Brommapojkarna
- 2016–2019: SK Brann (development)
- 2019–2022: AIK (development)
- 2022–2023: IK Start (development)
- 2024–: IFK Norrköping (sports director)
- * Club domestic league appearances and goals

Magni Fannberg Magnússon (born 12 August 1979) is an Icelandic football manager and former player who is the sports director of IFK Norrköping.

== Coaching career ==
In 2006, Magni was hired as an assistant coach to Sigurður Jónsson at Grindavík. With two games left of the season, he took over as manager along with Milan Stefán Janković aftur Sigurður left the team. He resigned from the team in October 2006, after the chairman of Grindavík ripped into Magni, Sigurður and Janković in a scathing article posted on the team's official website.

In October 2007, he was hired as the manager of Fjarðarbyggð. He resigned from his post in end of July the same year with the team in 8th place.

From 2009 to 2016, Magni coached at IF Brommapojkarna, including as the manager of the men's team from 2014 to 2015.

He served as the development manager of SK Brann from 2016 to 2019. In March 2019, he was hired as the development manager of AIK. The same year, he served as a scout with the Icelandic men's national team.

In February 2022, he was hired as the development manager of IK Start. He resigned in December 2023, citing turmoil and division at the club as the reason.

Since December 2024 is Magni IFK Norrköping sport director.

== Personal life ==
Magni grew up in Súðavík and Ísafjörður in the Westfjords region of Iceland. In 2009, he moved to Sweden with his partner, Lea Sif Valsdóttir. They have a daughter, Lára Dröfn Fannberg Magnadóttir (born 2010), and a son, Marcus Örn Fannberg Magnason (born 2015).
