= 2002 1. deild karla =

Icelandic football league season

The 2002 season of 1. deild karla was the 48th season of second-tier football in Iceland.

== League table ==
Pos	Team	Pld	W	D	L	GF	GA	GD	Pts	Promotion or relegation
1	Valur (C, P)	18	12	3	3	34	12	+22	39	Promoted to 2003 Úrvalsdeild
2	Þróttur R. (P)	18	10	3	5	40	21	+19	33	Promoted to 2003 Úrvalsdeild
3	Stjarnan	18	10	3	5	37	28	+9	33	
4	Afturelding	18	7	6	5	30	29	+1	27	
5	Víkingur R.	18	7	4	7	29	28	+1	25	
6	Haukar	18	6	6	6	26	22	+4	24	
7	Breiðablik	18	7	2	9	29	31	−2	23	
8	Leiftur/Dalvík (Note: Leiftur and Dalvík merged, resulting in Afturelding being promoted to 1. deild karla after the 2001 season.)	18	4	6	8	25	34	−9	18	
9	ÍR (R)	18	4	4	10	15	39	−24	16	Relegated to 2003 2. deild
10	Sindri (R)	18	3	3	12	14	35	−21	12	Relegated to 2003 2. deild

Source: rsssf.com
Rules for classification: 1) points; 2) goal difference; 3) number of goals scored.
(C) Champions; (P) Promoted; (R) Relegated

== Top scorers ==
Scorer	Goals	Team
(Iceland) Þorvaldur Már Guðmundsson	12	Afturelding
(Iceland) Brynjar Sverrisson	11	Þróttur R.
(Iceland) Sævar Eyjólfsson	9	Haukar
(Iceland) Björgólfur Takefusa	8	Þróttur R.
(Iceland) Magnús Már Lúðvíksson	8	Valur
(Iceland) Sigurbjörn Hreiðarsson	8	Valur
(Iceland) Garðar Jóhannsson	7	Stjarnan
(Iceland) Ívar Sigurjónsson	7	Breiðablik
(Iceland) Þorleifur Árnason	7	Leiftur/Dalvík
