= 2004 2. deild karla =

Icelandic football league season

The 2004 season of 2. deild karla was the 39th season of third-tier football in Iceland.

== League table ==
Pos	Team	Pld	W	D	L	GF	GA	GD	Pts	Promotion or relegation
1	KS (C, P)	18	12	3	3	53	30	+23	39	Promoted to 2005 1. deild karla
2	Víkingur Ó. (P)	18	12	3	3	32	12	+20	39	Promoted to 2005 1. deild karla
3	Leiknir R.	18	11	5	2	42	17	+25	38	
4	Afturelding	18	7	4	7	32	29	+3	25	
5	Selfoss	18	5	6	7	38	37	+1	21	
6	Leiftur/Dalvík	18	6	3	9	32	39	−7	21	
7	Tindastóll	18	5	6	7	35	44	−9	21	
8	ÍR	18	4	6	8	23	33	−10	18	
9	Víðir (R)	18	3	7	8	21	41	−20	16	Relegated to 2005 3. deild karla
10	KFS (R)	18	2	3	13	25	51	−26	9	Relegated to 2005 3. deild karla

Rules for classification: 1) points; 2) goal difference; 3) number of goals scored.
(C) Champions; (P) Promoted; (R) Relegated

== Top scorers ==
Scorer	Goals	Team
(Iceland) Ragnar Haukur Hauksson	17	KS
(Iceland) Þórður Birgisson	13	KS
(Iceland) Arilíus Marteinsson	13	Selfoss
(Denmark) Jakob Spangsberg Jensen	11	Leiknir R.
(Iceland) Hermann Geir Þórisson	10	Víkingur Ó.
(Iceland) Jón Örvar Eiríksson	9	Leiftur/Dalvík
(Iceland) Bjarki Már Flosason	9	KS
