= Hveragerði =

Town in Iceland

Hveragerðisbær
- Municipality
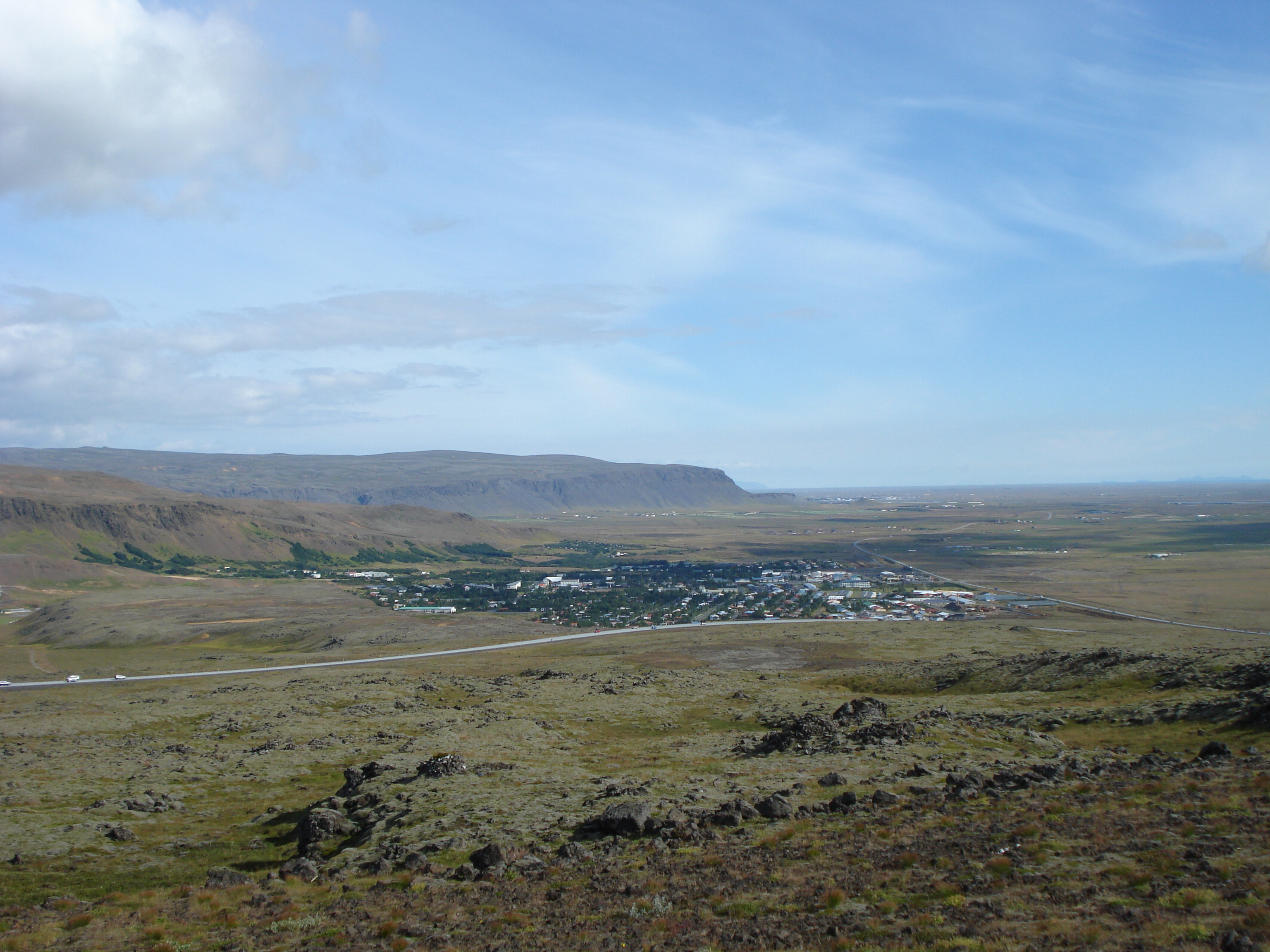
- View from Hellisheiði down over Hveragerði

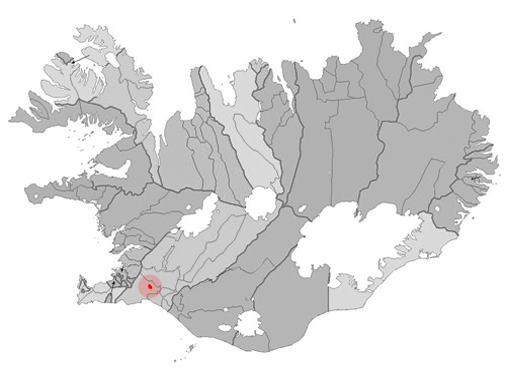
- Location of Hveragerðisbær

- Location within Iceland
- Coordinates: 63.9992211°N 21.2065315°W
- Country: Iceland
- Region: Southern Region
- Constituency: South Constituency

Government
  - Manager: Geir Sveinsson

Area
  - Total: 9 km^{2} (3.5 sq mi)

Population
  - Total: 2,657
  - Density: 295.22/km^{2} (764.6/sq mi)
- Postal code(s): 810
- Municipal number: 8716
- Website: hveragerdi.is

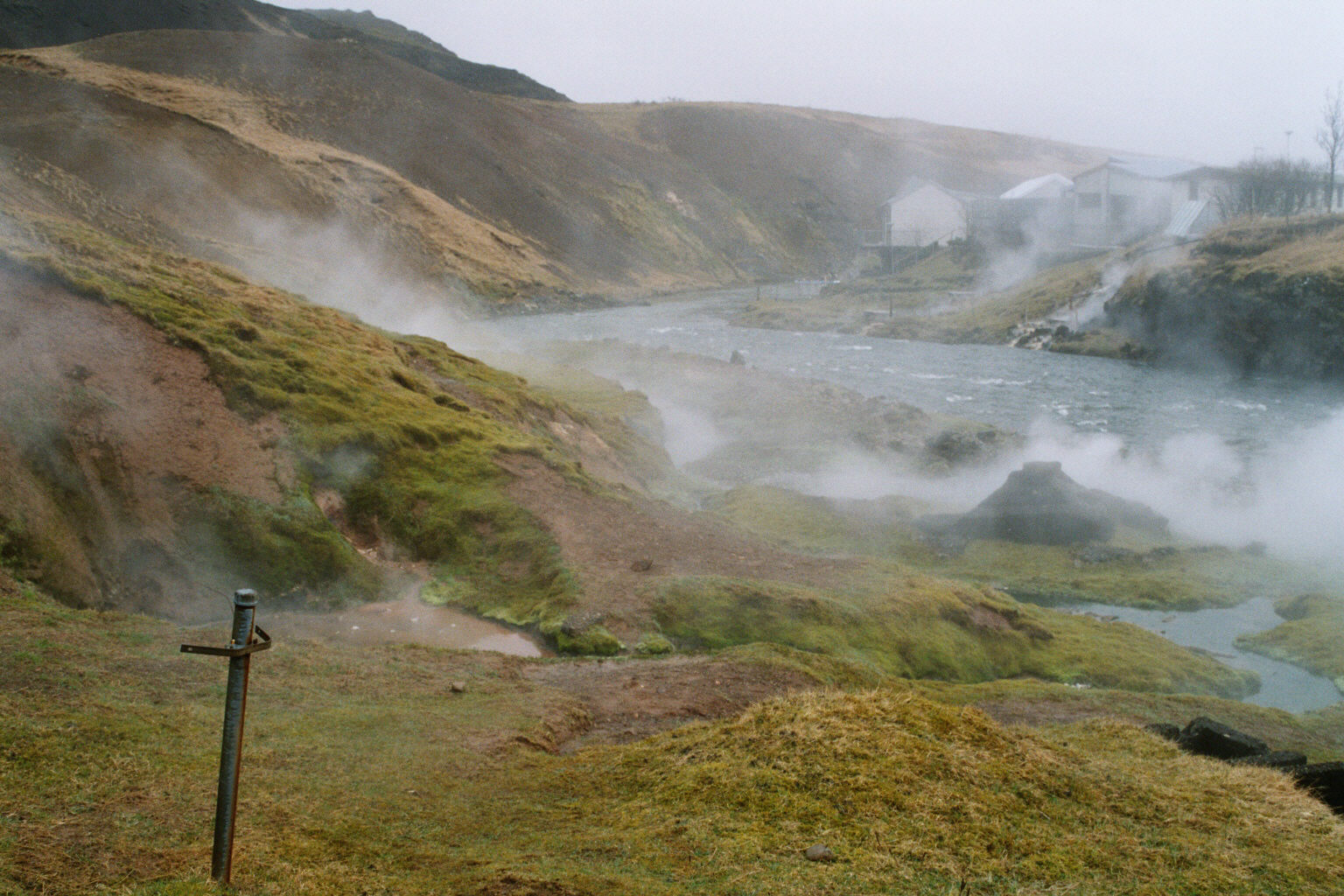
Hot springs in Hveragerði near river Varmá

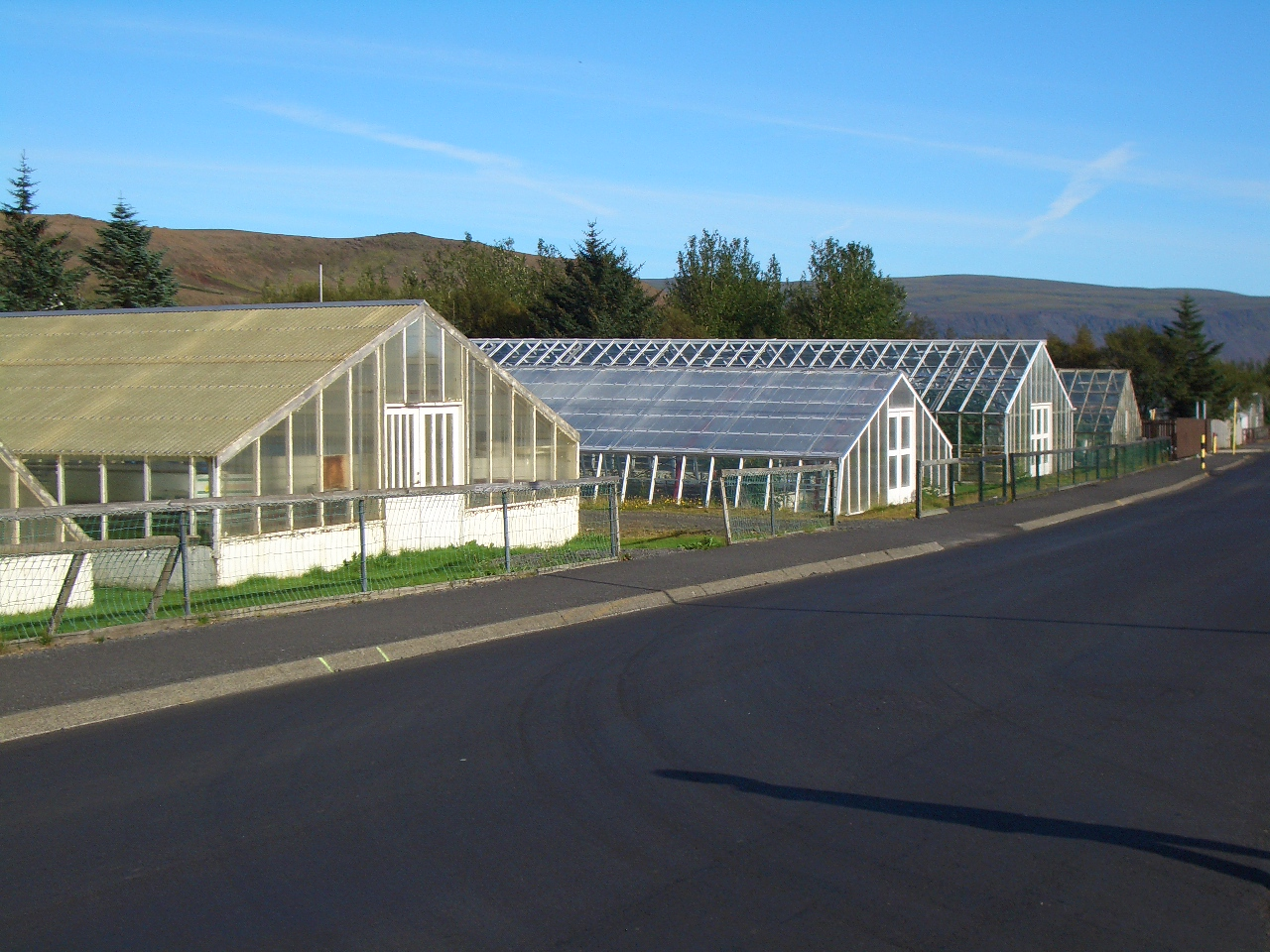
Greenhouses in Hveragerði

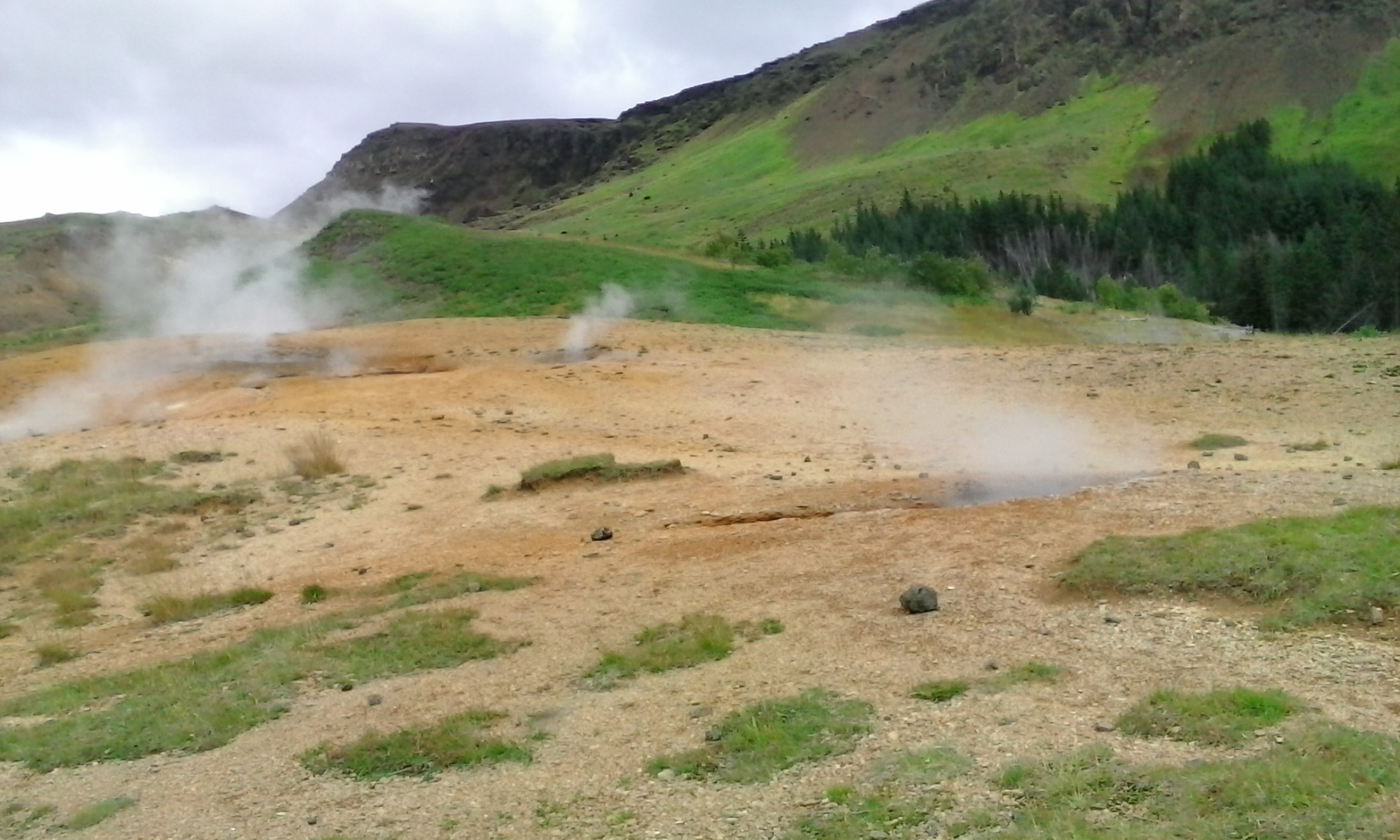
Hot spring area Leirgerður, lively again since 2008

Hveragerði (Icelandic pronunciation: [ˈkʰvɛːraˌcɛrðɪ, ˈxʷɛː-], "hot-spring yard") is a town and municipality in the south of Iceland, 45 km (28 mi) east of Reykjavík on Iceland's main ringroad, Route 1. The river Varmá runs through the town. With an area of 9 square kilometers (3.5 sq mi), Hveragerði is the third smallest municipality in Iceland by size.

== Overview ==
The surrounding area is part of the Hengill central volcano, and is geothermally active and experiences very frequent (usually minor) earthquakes. The town is known for its greenhouses, which are heated by hot water from volcanic hot springs. The first greenhouse was built in 1923. These springs are the site of occurrence of certain extremophile micro-organisms, that are capable of surviving in extremely hot environments. Close to the church is a hot spring called Sandhólshver ([ˈsantˌhoulsˌkʰvɛːr̥, -xʷɛːr̥], "sand hill hot-spring"), formed during the violent South Iceland earthquake of 1896. A fenced-off geothermal area in the town has numerous hot springs and fumaroles.

Hveragerði contains a number of greenhouses and is a hotbed for Icelandic horticulture.

To the south of Hveragerði, there is the small port of Þorlákshöfn, winter point of departure for the ferry to the Westman Islands.

== History ==
Water from hot springs has been used for heating in this area since 1929. Hveragerði had 121 inhabitants in 1940 and 399 in 1946. Hveragerði was awarded municipal status (kaupstaðuréttindi) on 1 July 1987. In 1989 the town had 1.593 inhabitants. On 29 May 2008 people were injured and many buildings in Hveragerði and its surroundings were damaged by a M_{w} 6.3 earthquake.

== Buildings and Culture ==
Hveragerðiskirkja, a modern Protestant church, was built 1967–72. Listasafn Árnesinga is a museum of arts founded in 1963 where about 500 pieces of art are exhibited. The exhibition Skjálftinn 2008 in Sunnumörk shopping centre refers to the earthquake of 2008. The town has one of Iceland's two largest swimming pools, called Laugaskarð, tied with Laugardalslaug in Reykjavik, which has two 50 m long swimming pools.

== Parks ==
Hveragarðurinn is a park with various hot springs and fumaroles and information boards providing explanations on the occurrence. In Lystigarðurinn Fossflöt, a park which was founded in 1983, a hydroelectric power station can be visited which was built as early as 1902 beside the waterfall Reykjafoss.

== Sport ==
The local football club is Hamar, competing in the 4. deild karla, the fifth tier of the Icelandic football league system.

== Twin towns – sister cities ==
Hveragerði is twinned with:

- Äänekoski, Finland
- Ikast-Brande, Denmark
- Örnsköldsvik, Sweden
- Sigdal, Norway
- Tarp, Germany

== Climate ==
Climate data for Reykir í Ölfusi (1981–2000)
Month	Jan	Feb	Mar	Apr	May	Jun	Jul	Aug	Sep	Oct	Nov	Dec	Year
Record high °C (°F)	8.2 (46.8)	9.0 (48.2)	8.6 (47.5)	15.1 (59.2)	19.2 (66.6)	24.0 (75.2)	23.3 (73.9)	21.0 (69.8)	18.5 (65.3)	13.0 (55.4)	10.9 (51.6)	10.5 (50.9)	24.0 (75.2)
Mean daily maximum °C (°F)	2.2 (36.0)	2.2 (36.0)	2.2 (36.0)	5.0 (41.0)	9.3 (48.7)	12.2 (54.0)	14.0 (57.2)	13.2 (55.8)	10.3 (50.5)	6.3 (43.3)	3.8 (38.8)	2.4 (36.3)	6.9 (44.5)
Daily mean °C (°F)	−0.2 (31.6)	−0.1 (31.8)	-0.0 (32.0)	2.2 (36.0)	6.2 (43.2)	9.0 (48.2)	10.8 (51.4)	10.3 (50.5)	7.6 (45.7)	4.3 (39.7)	1.8 (35.2)	0.1 (32.2)	4.3 (39.8)
Mean daily minimum °C (°F)	−2.7 (27.1)	−2.6 (27.3)	−2.6 (27.3)	−0.1 (31.8)	3.8 (38.8)	6.7 (44.1)	8.6 (47.5)	8.3 (46.9)	5.4 (41.7)	2.1 (35.8)	−0.3 (31.5)	−2.1 (28.2)	2.0 (35.7)
Record low °C (°F)	−14.4 (6.1)	−12.7 (9.1)	−14.9 (5.2)	−10.1 (13.8)	−7.3 (18.9)	−1.3 (29.7)	2.1 (35.8)	0.9 (33.6)	−3.1 (26.4)	−7.1 (19.2)	−11.2 (11.8)	−13.7 (7.3)	−14.9 (5.2)
Average precipitation mm (inches)	138.5 (5.45)	139.6 (5.50)	145.6 (5.73)	110.0 (4.33)	127.0 (5.00)	112.7 (4.44)	141.5 (5.57)	159.1 (6.26)	137.8 (5.43)	149.3 (5.88)	133.1 (5.24)	146.2 (5.76)	1,640.4 (64.59)
Mean monthly sunshine hours	18.2	46.4	100.8	147.5	159.0	150.8	142.3	125.2	112.2	81.3	40.3	14.1	1,138.1
Source: Icelandic Met Office

== See also ==
- Volcanism of Iceland
