= 2000 1. deild karla =

Icelandic football league season

The 2000 season of 1. deild karla was the 46th season of second-tier football in Iceland.

== League table ==
Pos	Team	Pld	W	D	L	GF	GA	GD	Pts	Promotion or relegation
1	FH (C, P)	18	13	4	1	47	13	+34	44 (Note: 1 bonus point?)	Promoted to 2001 Úrvalsdeild
2	Valur (P)	18	10	4	4	43	20	+23	34	Promoted to 2001 Úrvalsdeild
3	KA	18	10	4	4	38	23	+15	34	
4	Víkingur R.	18	9	3	6	40	32	+8	30	
5	ÍR	18	7	3	8	31	35	−4	24	
6	Tindastóll	18	6	2	10	29	33	−4	20	
7	Þróttur R.	18	5	5	8	24	31	−7	20	
8	Dalvík	18	6	2	10	32	42	−10	20	
9	Sindri (R)	18	3	9	6	14	20	−6	18	Relegated to 2001 2. deild
10	Skallagrímur (R)	18	3	0	15	18	67	−49	9	Relegated to 2001 2. deild

Source: rsssf.com
Rules for classification: 1) points; 2) goal difference; 3) number of goals scored.
(C) Champions; (P) Promoted; (R) Relegated

== Top scorers ==
Scorer	Goals	Team
(Iceland) Hörður Magnússon	20	FH
(Iceland) Sumarliði Árnason	19	Víkingur R.
(Iceland) Jóhann Hreiðarsson	12	Dalvík
(Iceland) Atli Viðar Björnsson	12	Dalvík
(Iceland) Þorvaldur Makan Sigbjörnsson	11	KA
(Iceland) Pétur Björn Jónsson	10	KA
(Iceland) Arnór Guðjohnsen	10	Valur
