= 2004 1. deild karla =

Icelandic football league season

The 2004 season of 1. deild karla was the 50th season of second-tier football in Iceland.

== League table ==
Pos	Team	Pld	W	D	L	GF	GA	GD	Pts	Promotion or relegation
1	Valur (C, P)	18	11	4	3	35	14	+21	37	Promoted to 2005 Úrvalsdeild
2	Þróttur R. (P)	18	8	6	4	31	23	+8	30	Promoted to 2005 Úrvalsdeild
3	HK	18	9	1	8	28	28	0	28	
4	Breiðablik	18	7	5	6	31	31	0	26	
5	Þór A.	18	5	10	3	19	16	+3	25	
6	Völsungur	18	6	4	8	27	29	−2	22	
7	Fjölnir	18	7	1	10	27	32	−5	22	
8	Haukar	18	4	7	7	27	27	0	19	
9	Njarðvík (R)	18	4	7	7	21	29	−8	19	Relegated to 2005 2. deild
10	Stjarnan (R)	18	5	3	10	28	45	−17	18	Relegated to 2005 2. deild

Source: rsssf.com
Rules for classification: 1) points; 2) goal difference; 3) number of goals scored.
(C) Champions; (P) Promoted; (R) Relegated

== Top scorers ==
Scorer	Goals	Team
(Iceland) Hörður Már Magnússon	9	HK
(Serbia and Montenegro) Dragoslav Stojanovic	9	Stjarnan
(The Gambia) Ibra Jagne	9	Þór A.
(Iceland) Páll Einarsson	9	Þróttur R.
(Iceland) Hermann Aðalgeirsson	9	Völsungur
(Iceland) Pétur Óskar Sigurðsson	8	Breiðablik
(Iceland) Davíð Þór Rúnarsson	8	Fjölnir
(Iceland) Sævar Eyjólfsson	8	Haukar
(Iceland) Hálfdán Gíslason	8	Valur
(Denmark) Sören Hermansen	7	Þróttur
(Iceland) Andri Valur Ívarsson	7	Völsungur
