= Knattspyrnufélag Breiðholts =

- Full name: Knattspyrnufélag Breiðholts
- Founded: January 17, 2007
- Ground: Leiknisvöllur, Reykjavík, Iceland
- Capacity: 1,300
- League: 5. deild karla Group A (2023)

Knattspyrnufélag Breiðholts (Icelandic pronunciation: [ˈkʰnahtˌspɪ(r)tnʏˌfjɛːˌlaːɣ ˈpreiðˌhɔl̥(t)s], lit. 'Breiðholt Football Club'), abbreviated as KB, is an Icelandic football club based in the Breiðholt area of the capital, Reykjavík. KB is used as reserve team for Leiknir Reykjavík and does not run a youth setup. It was founded in 2007.
