= Árborg FC =

- Full name: Knattspyrnufélagið Árborg
- Nickname: Hesta-Jói
- Founded: 2000
- Ground: JÁVERK-völlurinn; Selfoss, Iceland
- Chairman: Hafþór Theodórsson
- Coach: Eiríkur Raphael Elvy
- League: 4. deild karla
- 2025: 4. deild karla, 3rd of 10
Home colours	Away colours

Árborg Football Club (Icelandic: Knattspyrnufélagið Árborg), is an Icelandic football club in the municipality of Árborg, which contains two villages, Stokkseyri and Eyrarbakki, one country side called Sandvíkurhreppur, and a town called Selfoss.

The club's ground is in Selfoss where most of the players come from. Árborg FC currently plays in 4. deild karla (5th level in pyramid). They have been active members of KSÍ since 2001 before that the club was called Lesbískir Mávar (lesbian Seagulls) and played in the Sunnlenska Utandeild (Non division football south). Guðmundur Garðar Sigfússon is Árborg FC's most capped player with over 200 official games.

== Club career ==
Club career by season
Season	Position
2001	4th place in 3. deild karla (group B)
2002	3rd place in 3. deild karla (group A)
2003	4th place in 3. deild karla (group B)
2004	3rd place in 3. deild karla (group A)
2005	6th place in 3. deild karla (group B)
2006	5th place in 3. deild karla (group B)
2007	6th place in 3. deild karla (group A)
2008	3rd place in 3. deild karla (group A)
2009	3rd place in 3. deild karla (group A)
2010	1st place in 3. deild karla (group A), 3rd place overall
2011	2. deild karla 1st. won the league
2012	6th place in 3. deild karla (group A)
2013	5th place in 4. deild karla (group A)
