= Íþróttafélagið Hamar =

Icelandic sports club

- Sports: Badminton; Basketball; Football; Gymnastics; Swimming; Volleyball
- Founded: 1992
- Location: Hveragerði, Iceland
- Colors: Blue, white
- Website: Hamarsport.is

Íþróttafélagið Hamar (Icelandic pronunciation: [ˈiːˌθrouhtaˌfjɛːˌlaijɪð ˈhaːmar̥], lit. 'Hamar Sports Club' (Note: Íþróttafélagið is the definite form of Íþróttafélag, meaning "the sports club".)) is a multi-sports club based in Hveragerði, Iceland. There are six divisions: football, basketball, volleyball, swimming, badminton and gymnastics. The club was founded in 1992.

== Basketball ==
Körfuknattleiksdeild Hamars is the basketball subdivision of Hamar. It was founded on 10 September 1992.

=== Men's basketball ===
Hamar first fielded a men's team during the 1993–94 season when it participated in 2. deild karla. After three seasons in the 2. deild, Hamar won the league in 1997 and was promoted to 1. deild karla. During its first season in 1. deild, the team finished 5th in the league. During the summer, Hamar hired former Icelandic international player Pétur Ingvarsson as its player-coach. Behind his and star player Oleg Krijanovskij play, Hamar finished fourth in the league and made it to the playoffs. In the semi-finals, Hamar defeated Þór Þorlákshöfn 2–1 and advanced to the finals where it faced former Úrvalsdeild powerhouse Íþróttafélag Reykjavíkur. After losing the first game, 102–90, Hamar went on a won the next two for the 1. deild championship and promotion to the top-tier Úrvalsdeild karla.

=== Women's basketball ===
Hamar women's team was the runner-up to the 2010 national championship. The following season it posted the best record in the league. In May 2020, the club announced that they would field a joint women's team with Þór Þorlákshöfn in the 1. deild kvenna for the upcoming season.

== Football ==
=== Men's football ===
Íþróttafélagið Hamar
- Full name: Hamar Hveragerði
- Nicknames: Hamarsmenn; Hvergerðingar
- Founded: 1992; 34 years ago
- Ground: Grýluvöllur Hveragerði
- President: Ágúst Örlaugur Magnússon
- League: 4. deild karla
Home colours	Away colours

The men's football department of Íþróttafélagið Hamar played in the 4. deild karla as of 2020.

=== Women's football ===
In 2020, Hamar fielded a women's football team for the first time when it registered a team in the 2. deild kvenna.
