= Icelandic football league system =

Football league system in Iceland

The Icelandic football league system is a series of interconnected leagues for club football in Iceland. As of 2013 a fifth level was added to the previous men's format of four levels. As of 2019 there are 79 participating men's teams and 27 women's teams in the football league.

== The system ==
Below shows how the current system, as of 2022, works. For each division, its official name and number of clubs is given. Each division promotes to the division(s) that lie directly above them and relegates to the division(s) that lie directly below them.

=== Men's leagues ===
Level	League(s) / Division(s)
1 12	Besta deild karla (Nationwide League); 12 clubs
	↓↑ 2 clubs
2 12	1. deild karla; (Nationwide League); 12 clubs
	↓↑ 2 clubs
3 12	2. deild karla; (Nationwide League); 12 clubs
	↓↑ 2 clubs
4 12	3. deild karla; (Nationwide League); 12 clubs
	↓↑ 2 clubs
5 10	4. deild karla; (Nationwide League); 10 clubs
6 18	5. deild karla; (Nationwide League); 17 clubs divided in 2 groups as of 2025

Before 2023, only two teams were promoted from the fifth-tier 4. deild karla. The top two teams from each group play in a knock-out competition (played home and away) with the final being one match determining the 4. deild champions. Both finalists are promoted to 3. deild karla. The two teams relegated from 3. deild take a place in 4. deild, in one of four groups. The groups can change from year to year based on the number of teams. Football Association of Iceland attempts to distribute the teams evenly between groups.

==== Cup competitions ====
Clubs at all five levels are eligible for cup competitions.

- Bikarkeppni KSÍ (Icelandic cup)
- Deildarbikar karla (League cup)
- Meistarakeppni karla (Men's Super Cup)

=== Women's leagues ===
Level	League(s) / Division(s)
1 10	Besta deild kvenna (Nationwide League); 10 clubs
2 10	1. deild kvenna; (Nationwide League); 10 clubs
3 10	2. deild kvenna; (Nationwide League); 10 clubs
3 10	3. deild kvenna; (Nationwide League); 10 clubs

==== Cup competitions ====
- Bikarkeppni KSÍ (Icelandic cup)
- Deildabikar kvenna (League cup)
- Meistarakeppni kvenna (Women's super cup)
