= Léttir =

- Full name: Léttir Knattspyrnufélag
- Founded: 1979 (Year of foundation)
- Ground: ÍR-völlur; Reykjavík
- Capacity: 800
- Manager: Kristófer Davíð Traustason and Steinar Haraldsson
- League: 5. deild karla Group A
Home colours	Away colours

Léttir (Icelandic pronunciation: [ˈljɛhtɪr̥]) is an Icelandic football club located in Reykjavík. They currently play in the 4. deild karla (fifth tier) league, and participate in the Icelandic Cup. Originally a club based in Laugardalur in Reykjavík before being folded in the beginning of the 21. century.

Léttir was reestablished in 2009 as a “reserve” club for Íþróttafélag Reykjavíkur. Léttir has since played in the lowest tier of the Icelandic football league system.

== Stadium ==
Léttir play their home matches in the astroturf Léttisbúr (Léttir Cage), which is located at ÍR-völlur ground in south-east Reykjavík. Owned by 2. deild karla (third tier) club Íþróttafélag Reykjavíkur. The stadium's capacity is 800.

The name Léttisbúr or the Léttir cage stems from the tall surrounding fence around the pitch.

== Achievements ==
- 3. deild karla:
  - Runners Up (1): 1998–99

== Coaches ==
- Halldór Þ. Halldórsson 2009 - 2010
- Eiður Ottó Bjarnason 2011
- Sigurður H. Höskuldsson 2012
- Ríkarð Óskar Guðnason 2013–2014
- Guðbjartur H. Ólafsson 2015–2016
- Sigmann Þórðarson and Kristján Ari Halldórsson 2017–2019
- Haukur M. Ólafsson and Stefán K. Snorrason 2020
- Kristófer D. Traustason and Steinar Haraldsson 2021–2022
- Andri and Stebbinho 2022-

== See also ==
- Icelandic football league system
- Football in Iceland
