= 2. deild karla =

- Founded: 1997; 29 years ago 1988 (as 3. deild karla); 1966 (as 3. deild karla NA/SV)
- Country: Iceland
- Confederation: UEFA
- Number of clubs: 12
- Level on pyramid: 3
- Promotion to: Lengjudeildin
- Relegation to: 3. deild karla
- Domestic cup(s): Bikarkeppni karla League Cup
- Current champions: Ægir (2025)
- Most championships: Völsungur (6 titles)
- Website: KSÍ.is
- Current: 2025 2. deild karla

2. deild karla (transl. Men's Second Division) is a football league in Iceland. It is the third division in the Icelandic football league system. The current champions are Afturelding from Mosfellsbær, who won their 1st title in 2018.

The division was started in 1966 as third division with two provisional groups, with number of teams varying from 7 to 10 teams in each group. In 1987 it was decided to merge the two groups to form a single nationwide league with 10 teams so at the end of the 1987 season only three teams from each group would stay in the league, the top teams in each group were promoted, all other teams relegated to the 4th division and two teams promoted from the 4th division. In 1997 after a name change, the division became Second division.

In 2008, as a part of a general change in Icelandic football, the number of teams was increased from 10 to 12.

== Current clubs (2027) ==
Team	Location	Stadium	2026 season
Dalvík/Reynir	Dalvík	Dalvíkurvöllur	4th
Fjölnir	Reykjavík (Grafarvogur)	Fjölnisvöllur	6th
Grindavík	Grindavík	Grindavíkurvöllur	1. deild, 11th
Kári	Akranes	Akraneshöllin	3rd
KH	Reykjavík (Hlíðar)	Hlíðarendi	3 deild, 2nd
KFA	Fjarðabyggð	Fjarðabyggðarhöllin	7th
Kormákur/Hvöt	Blönduós	Blönduósvöllur	8th
Magni	Grenivík	Grenivíkurvöllur	9th
Víðir	Garður	Nesfisk-völlurinn	3. deild, 1st
Víkingur Ó.	Ólafsvík	Ólafsvíkurvöllur	5th
Ægir	Þorlákshöfn	Þorlákshafnarvöllur	1. deild, 12th
Þróttur V.	Vogar	Vogaídýfuvöllur	10th

== History ==
=== Championship History ===
- 1966 Selfoss – (Selfoss)
- 1967 FH – (Hafnarfjörður)
- 1968 Völsungur – (Húsavík)
- 1969 Ármann – (Reykjavík)
- 1970 Þróttur N. – (Neskaupstaður)
- 1971 Völsungur – (Húsavík)
- 1972 Þróttur N. – (Neskaupstaður)
- 1973 ÍBÍ – (Ísafjörður)
- 1974 Víkingur Ó. – (Ólafsvík)
- 1975 Þór A. – (Akureyri)
- 1976 Reynir S. – (Sandgerði)
- 1977 Fylkir – (Reykjavík)
- 1978 Selfoss – (Selfoss)
- 1979 Völsungur – (Húsavík)
- 1980 Reynir S. – (Sandgerði)
- 1981 Njarðvík – (Njarðvík)
- 1982 Víðir – (Garður)
- 1983 Skallagrímur – (Borgarnes)
- 1984 Fylkir – (Reykjavík)
- 1985 Selfoss – (Selfoss)
- 1986 Leiftur – (Ólafsfjörður)
- 1987 Fylkir – (Reykjavík)
- 1988 Stjarnan – (Garðabær)
- 1989 KS – (Siglufjörður)
- 1990 Þróttur R. – (Reykjavík)
- 1991 Leiftur – (Ólafsfjörður)
- 1992 Tindastóll – (Sauðárkrókur)
- 1993 Selfoss – (Selfoss)
- 1994 Skallagrímur – (Borgarnes)
- 1995 Völsungur – (Húsavík)
- 1996 Dalvík – (Dalvík)
- 1997 HK – (Kópavogur)
- 1998 Víðir – (Garður)
- 1999 Tindastóll – (Sauðárkrókur)
- 2000 Þór A. – (Akureyri)
- 2001 Haukar – (Hafnarfjörður)
- 2002 HK – (Kópavogur)
- 2003 Völsungur – (Húsavík)
- 2004 KS – (Siglufjörður)
- 2005 Leiknir R. – (Reykjavík)
- 2006 Fjarðabyggð – (Fjarðabyggð)
- 2007 Haukar – (Hafnarfjörður)
- 2008 ÍR – (Reykjavík)
- 2009 Grótta – (Seltjarnarnes)
- 2010 Víkingur Ólafsvík – (Ólafsvík)
- 2011 Tindastóll/Hvöt – (Sauðárkrókur/Blönduós)
- 2012 Völsungur – (Húsavík)
- 2013 HK – (Kópavogur)
- 2014 Fjarðabyggð – (Fjarðabyggð)
- 2015 Huginn – (Seyðisfjörður)
- 2016 ÍR – (Reykjavík)
- 2017 Njarðvík – (Njarðvík)
- 2018 Afturelding – (Mosfellsbær)
- 2019 UMF Leiknir – (Fáskrúðsfjörður)
- 2020 Kórdrengir – (Reykjavík)* – 2020 tournament was stopped due to the COVID-19 pandemic with two games left.
- 2021 Þróttur V. – (Vogar)
- 2022 Njarðvík – (Njarðvík)
- 2023 Dalvík/Reynir – (Dalvík)
- 2024 Selfoss – (Selfoss)
