= Íþróttafélag Hafnarfjarðar =

Icelandic sports club

ÍH
- Full name: Íþróttafélag Hafnarfjarðar
- Founded: 1983
- Ground: Skessan, Hafnarfjörður, Iceland
- Chairman: Pétur Hrafn Friðriksson
- Manager: Bjarni Guðmundsson
- League: 4. deild karla
- 2025: 3. deild karla, 12th of 12 (relegated)

Íþróttafélag Hafnarfjarðar (Icelandic pronunciation: [ˈiːˌθrouhtaˌfjɛːˌlaːɣ ˈhapnarˌfjarðar̥], lit. 'Hafnarfjörður Sports Club'), commonly known as ÍH, is an Icelandic sports club from the town of Hafnarfjörður. It was founded in 1983 as a handball club but later fielded other sports departments, such as in football and basketball.
