= UMFS Dalvík =

Icelandic sports club

UMFS Dalvík (officially named Ungmennafélag Svarfdæla, usually referred to as Dalvík, previously referred to as Svarfdælir) is an Icelandic sports club located in Dalvík. The club has had competitors in various sports in Iceland, most notably football, athletics and basketball. The club currently has no senior football team but is part of the Dalvík/Reynir cooperation and has youth teams playing in national competitions. Dalvík has also had teams playing in national handball and volleyball leagues.

== History ==
UMFS Dalvík was founded in 1909 and was from the start involved in and organized various activities for youth in the Svarfaðardalur area, mostly sports.

In 1978 the club first entered the Icelandic football league, playing in a 3rd division provincial group for two seasons, 1978 and 1979. UMFS Dalvík re-joined the football league in 1982 starting in the newly formed 4th division. The club's sole national honour came in 1996 when it won the 3rd division championship.

=== Leiftur/Dalvík ===
In 2002 UMFS Dalvík joined with rivals ÍF Leiftur from Ólafsfjörður forming a new club, Leiftur/Dalvík ending UMFS Dalvík's direct involvement in the football league. After the 2005 season the Leiftur/Dalvík partnership broke up and Dalvík joined another rivals, Reynir Árskógsströnd, in forming Dalvík/Reynir. At the same time, Leiftur merged with the team of another neighbouring town, Siglufjörður's Knattspyrnufélag Siglufjarðar (Siglufjörður Football Club - KS for short) to remain in the third tier with the new side named KS/Leiftur. They were renamed KF in 2011.

== Honours ==
- 3. deild (level 3)

Winners 1996

== Statistics and records ==
=== League ===
- Best league finishing

1. deild karla 5th in 1999
