= Ungmennafélag Njarðvíkur =

Icelandic sports club

Njarðvík
- Full name: Ungmennafélag Njarðvíkur
- Short name: Njarðvík
- Founded: 1944; 82 years ago
- Chairman: Erlingur Hannesson
- Website: umfn.is

Ungmennafélag Njarðvíkur (Icelandic pronunciation: [ˈuŋkˌmɛnːaˌfjɛːˌlaːɣ ˈnjarðˌviːkʏr̥], lit. 'Njarðvík Youth Club') is an Icelandic multi-sports club based in Njarðvík, Reykjanesbær, on the south-west peninsula of Iceland. It is primarily known for its men's basketball team which has won the national championship 17 times. Its women's basketball team won the national championship and the basketball cup in 2012. The club also fields departments in football, swimming, power lifting, judo and triathlon.

== Colours ==
The original uniform colours of the club were blue and white. In late 1973 the basketball department was in need of new uniforms and due to lack of funds they decided to select a colour that no other team was using, so they wouldn't have to buy two sets of uniforms. There were three colours to choose from but as the three selectors were all Boston Celtics fans they decided to choose green uniforms. The green colour has been in use since then, except for the 1989–90 season when the basketball department played in the orange colour of its biggest sponsor, Hagkaup.

== Basketball ==
=== Men's basketball ===
As of the 2017–2018 season, Njarðvík's men's basketball team plays in the top-tier Úrvalsdeild karla.

==== Trophies and achievements ====
- Icelandic champions: (17):
  - 1952, 1953, 1956, 1958, 1981, 1982, 1984, 1985, 1986, 1987, 1991, 1994, 1995, 1998, 2001, 2002, 2006
- Icelandic Cup: (5):
  - 1987, 1988, 1989, 1990, 1992, 1999, 2002, 2005

=== Women's basketball ===
As of the 2017–2018 season, Njarðvík's women's basketball team plays in the top-tier Úrvalsdeild kvenna.

==== Trophies and achievements ====
- Icelandic champions::
  - 2012, 2022, 2026
- Icelandic Cup:
  - 2012, 2025

== Football ==
=== Men's football ===
Njarðvík men's football team currently plays in the second-tier Inkasso league after winning the third-tier 2. deild karla in 2017.

==== Trophies and achievements ====
- 2. deild karla (Men's Second Division ): (2)
  - 1981
  - 2017
  - 2022
- League Cup B (cup): (1)
  - 2003
  - 2012 (Runner up)
  - 2017 (Runner up)
