= Knattspyrnufélag Fjarðabyggðar =

KFF
- Full name: Knattspyrnufélag Fjarðabyggðar
- Founded: 2001
- Dissolved: 2022
- Ground: Eskifjarðarvöllur, Fjarðabyggð
- 2021: 2. deild karla, 11th of 12th (relegated)
Home colours	Away colours

Knattspyrnufélag Fjarðabyggðar (Icelandic pronunciation: [ˈkʰnahtˌspɪ(r)tnʏˌfjɛːˌlaːɣ ˈfjarðaˌpɪɣðar], lit. 'Fjarðabyggð Football Club'), abbreviated as KFF, was an Icelandic football club from the town of Fjarðabyggð located on the east coast of Iceland.

== History ==
The club was founded in 2001 with a merger of three local clubs, Íþróttafélagið Þróttur Neskaupstað, Ungmennafélagið Austri Eskifirði and Ungmennafélagið Valur Reyðarfirði. The next year, for the first time, Fjarðabyggð sent a women's team to play at league level. In 2010 Ungmennafélagið Súlan Stöðvarfirði came into the merger.

=== Austfjarða ===
In 2022, the club merged with Leiknir Fáskrúðsfjörður to establish the new Knattspyrnufélag Austfjarða.

== Managers ==
- (Iceland) Magni Fannberg Magnússon (2007–2008)
