= Bjarni Felixson =

Icelandic footballer (1936–2023)

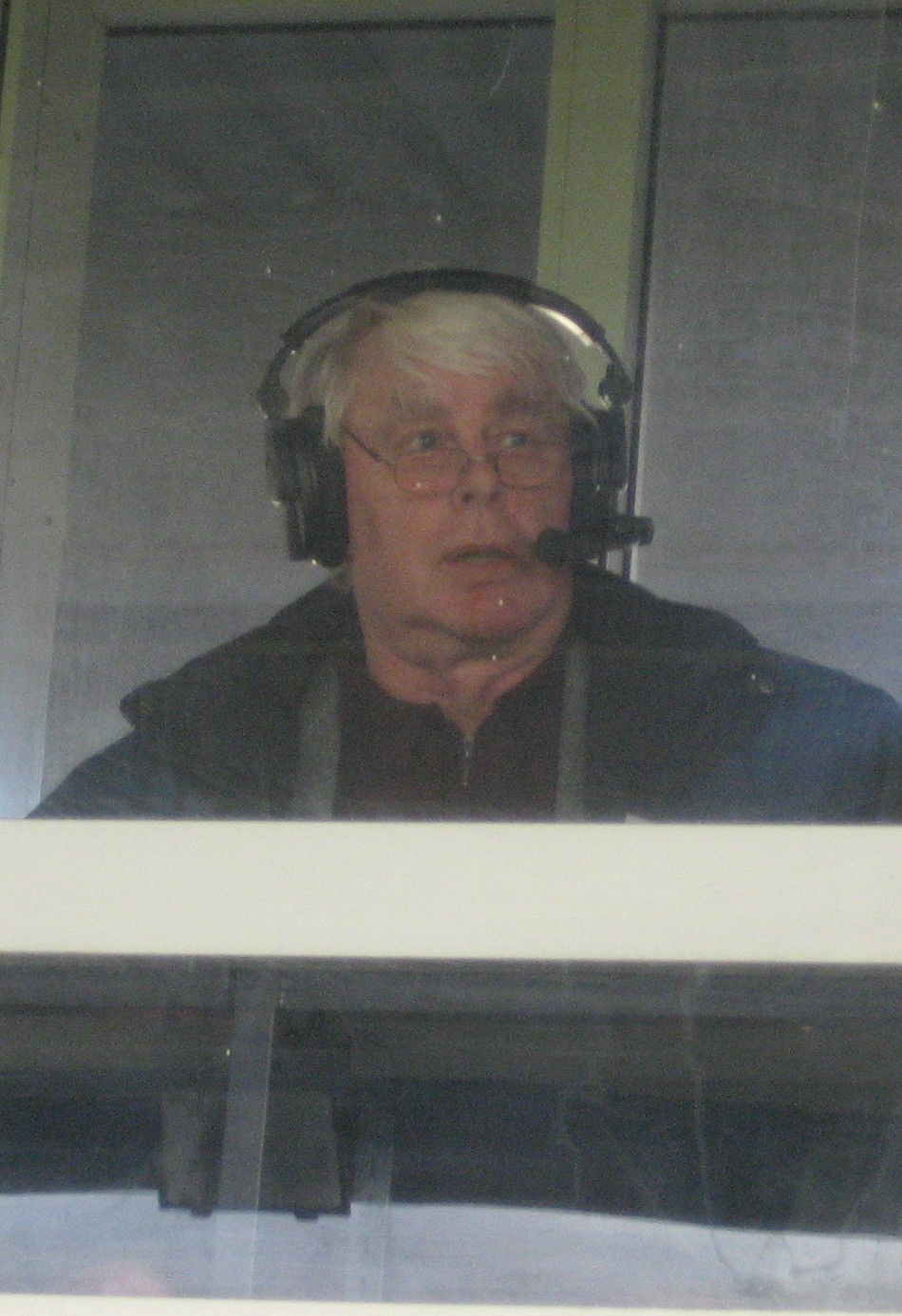
- Born: 27 December 1936; Reykjavík, Iceland
- Died: 14 September 2023 (aged 86); Copenhagen, Denmark
- Other names: Bjarni Fel, The Red Lion
- Occupations: Sports reporter, commentator
Association football career
- Position: Defender
Senior career*
Years	Team	Apps	(Gls)
1956–1968	KR		
International career
1962–1964	Iceland	6	(0)
- * Club domestic league appearances and goals

Bjarni Felixson (27 December 1936 – 14 September 2023), commonly known as Bjarni Fel, was an Icelandic footballer, sports reporter and commentator. Nicknamed The Red Lion due to his red hair, he won six caps for the Iceland national team between 1962 and 1964. He played for Knattspyrnufélag Reykjavíkur for several seasons, winning the national championship five times and the Icelandic Cup seven times. Following his playing career, he became a sports reporter and commentator for RÚV for 42 years.

== Playing career ==
From 1956 to 1968, Bjarni played for Knattspyrnufélag Reykjavíkur. Playing as a defender, he was not known as a great offensive threat and only scored two goals during his career. In a 1997 interview with Morgunblaðið, he stated that after scoring what ended being his last goal, the opposing goalkeeper muttered "I knew I should've retired last season".

== Broadcasting career ==
In 1969, Bjarni was hired by RÚV as a part-time commentator for broadcasts of Premier League matches. In 1972, he was hired fulltime by RÚV where he stayed on as a sports reporter and commentator for 42 years and was the prime factor in bringing English football to the Icelandic audience. He was at Hillsborough Stadium as a commentator during the Hillsborough disaster.

== Personal life and death ==
Bjarni's brothers, Hörður Felixson and Gunnar Felixson, both played with him on KR and the Icelandic national team. In 1963, all three brothers played together for Iceland in two games against England.

In 2008, a sports bar in Reykjavík was named Bjarni Fel Sportsbar in his honour.

Bjarni died on 14 September 2023, at the age of 86, in Copenhagen, Denmark, where he was to attend the funeral of Finn Heiner, the former head of sports of Denmarks radio.

== Honours ==
KR

- Icelandic Championships: 1959, 1961, 1963, 1965, 1968
- Icelandic Cup (7): 1960, 1961, 1962, 1963, 1964, 1966, 1967
