= Ellert Schram =

Icelandic footballer and politician (1939–2025)

6th Chairman of KSÍ
- In office 1973–1989
- Preceded by: Albert Guðmundsson
- Succeeded by: Eggert Magnússon

5th President of ÍSÍ
- In office 1991–2006
- Preceded by: Sveinn Björnsson
- Succeeded by: Ólafur Rafnsson

Personal details
- Born: 10 October 1939 Reykjavík, Kingdom of Iceland
- Died: 24 January 2025 (aged 85)
- Spouse(s): Anna G. Ásgeirsdóttir (divorced); Ágústa Jóhannsdóttir
- Children: 6
- Parent(s): Aldís Þorbjörg Brynjólfsdóttir; Björgvin Schram
- Relatives: Arna Schram (daughter)
- Education: University of Iceland
Association football career
- Full name: Ellert Björgvinsson Schram
- Position: Forward
Senior career*
Years	Team	Apps	(Gls)
1957–1971	KR		(62)
International career
1960–1970	Iceland	23	(6)
Managerial career
- 1973: KR
- * Club domestic league appearances and goals

Ellert Björgvinsson Schram (10 October 1939 – 24 January 2025) was an Icelandic footballer and politician.

== Football career ==
=== Club ===
At club level Ellert played as a forward for Knattspyrnufélag Reykjavíkur and competed at the 1966–67 European Cup, scoring two goals against FC Nantes. He played in the Icelandic top-tier league from 1957 to 1971, scoring 62 goals.

He won the Icelandic Football Cup seven times with KR from 1960 to 1967. He was captain of Knattspyrnufélag Reykjavíkur when they played Liverpool in August 1964 which was Liverpool's first ever European game. KR lost the first game 5–1 and lost 11–1 on aggregate.

=== International ===
Ellert was part of the Iceland national football team between 1959 and 1970. He played 23 matches, scoring 6 goals.

=== Managerial career ===
Ellert was the manager of KR during the 1973 season.

=== Honours ===
- Icelandic championships: 1959, 1961, 1963, 1965, 1968
- Icelandic Football Cup (7): 1960, 1961, 1962, 1963, 1964, 1966, 1967

== Political career ==
After his playing days were over, Ellert served as the chairman of the Football Association of Iceland from 1973 to 1989. He served as a member of Alþingi for the Independence Party, from 1971 to 1979 and again from 1983 to 1987, and for the Social Democratic Alliance from 2007 to 2009.

== Death ==
Ellert died on 24 January 2025, at the age of 85.
