= 1967 Denmark v Iceland football match =

- Event: International friendly
Denmark	Iceland
(Denmark)	(Iceland)
14	2
- Date: 23 August 1967
- Venue: Idrætsparken, Copenhagen
- Referee: Curth Nystrand (Sweden)
- Attendance: 19,500

The 1967 Denmark v Iceland football match was an international friendly association football match between the senior national teams of Denmark and Iceland. The match took place on 23 August 1967 at Idrætsparken in Copenhagen, Denmark. The match finished as a 14–2 win for Denmark and has been called the worst day in the history of Icelandic football.

== Background ==
The Icelandic team consisted mostly of players from the U-23 which had recently won the Norwegian U-23 and played well against Sweden U-23.

== The match ==
23 August 1967

Denmark	14–2	Iceland
John Steen Olsen 7', 40'; Finn Laudrup 7', 28', 85'; Kresten Bjerre 13', 71', 76'; Tom Søndergaard 15'; Ulrik Le Fevre 57', 61', 67'; Erik Dyreborg 60', 65'		Helgi Númason 56'; Hermann Gunnarsson 62'

Idrætsparken, Copenhagen
Attendance: 19,500
Referee: Curth Nystrand (Sweden)

GK	1	Jørgen Henriksen
2	Johnny Hansen
3	John Worbye (c)
5	Henning Boel
4	Kresten Bjerre
6	Erik Sandvad
7	John Steen Olsen	(substituted off) 85'
8	Finn Laudrup
9	Erik Dyreborg
10	Tom Søndergaard
11	Ulrik le Fevre
Substitutes:
4	Keld Bak	(substituted in) 85'
Manager:
(Denmark) Ernst Netuka

GK	1	Guðmundur Pétursson
2	Jóhannes Sandhólm Atlason	(substituted off) 46'
3	Jón Stefánsson
4	Guðni Kjartansson
5	Anton Bjarnason
6	Guðni Jónsson
7	Björn Lárusson
8	Eyleifur Hafsteinsson (c)
9	Hermann Gunnarsson
10	Helgi Númason
11	Kári Árnason
Substitutes:
12	Sigurður Dagsson
13	Baldur Sveinn Scheving
14	Sigurður Albertsson	(substituted in) 46'
15	Þórður Jónsson
16	Ernst Elmar Geirsson
Manager:
(Iceland) Reynir Karlsson

== Aftermath ==
While Denmark was viewed as heavy favorites, the end score caused a shock in Iceland and the selection younger players in place of more experienced was heavily criticised.

== See also ==
- History of the Denmark national football team
