= 1953 Úrvalsdeild =

Icelandic football tournament edition

Úrvalsdeild
- Season: 1953

Statistics of Úrvalsdeild in the 1953 season.

== Overview ==
It was contested by 6 teams, and ÍA won the championship. ÍA's Ríkharður Jónsson was the top scorer with 5 goals.

== Group A ==
Pos	Team	Pld	W	D	L	GF	GA	GD	Pts	ÍA	KR	FRA
1	ÍA (C)	2	2	0	0	8	1	+7	4		4–0	4–1
2	KR	2	1	0	1	3	5	−2	2			3–1
3	Fram	2	0	0	2	2	7	−5	0			

Source: rsssf.com
Rules for classification: 1) points; 2) goal difference; 3) number of goals scored.
(C) Champions

== Group B ==
Pos	Team	Pld	W	D	L	GF	GA	GD	Pts	VAL	VÍK	ÞRÓ
1	Valur	2	2	0	0	8	2	+6	4		3–1	5–1
2	Víkingur	2	1	0	1	6	3	+3	2			5–0
3	Þróttur	2	0	0	2	1	10	−9	0			

Source: rsssf.com
Rules for classification: 1) points; 2) goal difference; 3) number of goals scored.

== Final ==
6 September 1953

ÍA	3–2	Valur
Þórðarson 24'; Jónsson 49'; Hannesson 68'		Guðmundsson 29'; Sigurðsson 45'

Melavöllurinn, Reykjavík
Attendance: c.4,000
Referee: Guðjón Einarsson
