= Erik Dyreborg =

Danish footballer (1940–2013)

Personal information
- Full name: Erik Birger Dyreborg
- Date of birth: 20 January 1940
- Place of birth: Copenhagen, Denmark
- Date of death: 12 November 2013 (aged 73)
- Place of death: Herning, Denmark
- Position: Striker

Senior career*
Years	Team	Apps	(Gls)
1958–1961	BK Frem		
1961– ?	Næstved IF		
1968	Boston Beacons	29	(13)
- Holland Sport
- Avesta AIK

International career
1967	Denmark	6	(8)
- * Club domestic league appearances and goals

Erik Birger Dyreborg (né Poulsen, 20 January 1940 – 12 November 2013) was a Danish footballer who played as a striker. He scored eight goals in his six matches for the Danish national team, before he became professional with Boston Beacons. He is most noted for his five goals in an international match against Norway.

== Career ==
He started his career named Poulsen as an amateur in the Danish club BK Frem, and won silver in the 1958 Danish 1st Division. In 1960, he was travelling with the Danish national B team to Herning. Eight players lost their lives when the plane Dyreborg was supposed to travel with crashed, but Dyreborg had been put on a different plane to make room for a kit basket. In 1961, he transferred to Næstved IF.

Dyreborg made his debut for the Danish national team in the 14–2 smashing against Iceland, where he scored two goals and assisted eight. He was however criticized by the Danish media for not being able to score more goals. In his sixth match for the national team, against Norway on 24 September 1967, he had decided to shoot every time he had the ball, and not pass the ball to teammates with a better chance of scoring. The match ended 5–0, with Dyreborg scoring all the five goals.

After scoring eight goals in six matches for the Danish national team, he turned professional with Boston Beacons in 1968, in the newly formed North American Soccer League, which, put an end to his national team career as professionals was not allowed to play for the national team. Dyreborg was one of many Danish footballers who turned professional in the United States in 1968, and Henning Boel, John Steen Olsen, Jørgen Henriksen, and John Petersen were all playing on Boston Beacons. The league soon became bankrupt and after one season with the Beacons, Dyreborg moved on to Dutch club Holland Sport, before ending his career with Swedish club Avesta AIK.

Dyreborg returned to Denmark after his professional career ended, and played veteran football for his youth club BK Frem. He died in Hornbaek at the age of 73 in 2013, following a brief undisclosed illness.

== Career statistics ==
=== International ===
Appearances and goals by national team and year
National team	Year	Apps	Goals
Denmark	1967	6	8
Total		6	8

Scores and results list Denmark's goal tally first, score column indicates score after each Dyreborg goal.

List of international goals scored by Erik Dyreborg
No.	Date	Venue	Opponent	Score	Result	Competition
1	23 August 1967	Københavns Idrætspark, Copenhagen, Denmark	Iceland	8–1	14–2	Friendly
2	23 August 1967	Københavns Idrætspark, Copenhagen, Denmark	Iceland	10–2	14–2	Friendly
3	24 September 1967	Ullevaal Stadion, Oslo, Norway	Norway	1–0	5–0	1964–67 Nordic Football Championship
4	24 September 1967	Ullevaal Stadion, Oslo, Norway	Norway	2–0	5–0	1964–67 Nordic Football Championship
5	24 September 1967	Ullevaal Stadion, Oslo, Norway	Norway	3–0	5–0	1964–67 Nordic Football Championship
6	24 September 1967	Ullevaal Stadion, Oslo, Norway	Norway	4–0	5–0	1964–67 Nordic Football Championship
7	24 September 1967	Ullevaal Stadion, Oslo, Norway	Norway	5–0	5–0	1964–67 Nordic Football Championship
8	11 October 1967	Zentralstadion, Leipzig, East Germany	East Germany	1–0	2–3	UEFA Euro 1968 qualification
