= 1961 Icelandic Cup =

Bikarkeppni karla

Tournament details
- Country: Iceland

Final positions
- Champions: KR
- Runners-up: Fram

The 1961 Icelandic Cup was the second edition of the National Football Cup.

It took place between 14 August 1961 and 22 October 1961, with the final played at Melavöllur in Reykjavík between KR Reykjavík and IA Akranes. Teams from the Úrvalsdeild karla (1st division) did not enter until the quarter finals. In prior rounds, teams from the 2. Deild (2nd division), as well as reserve teams, played in one-legged matches. In case of a draw, the match was replayed.

== First round ==
Team 1	Team 2	Result
IA Akranes B	Knattspyrnufélagið Þróttur B	2 - 3 (game replayed after 3–3 draw)
Knattspyrnufélagið Þróttur	KR Reykjavík B	6 - 3

== Second round ==
- Entrance of Breiðablik UBK, Víkingur Reykjavík, ÍB Isafjörður, Keflavík ÍF and reserve teams from Fram Reykjavík B and Valur Reykjavík B

Team 1	Team 2	Result
Valur Reykjavík B	Knattspyrnufélagið Þróttur	4 - 2 (game replayed after 1–1 draw)
Fram Reykjavík	Breiðablik UBK	4 - 2
ÍB Isafjörður	Víkingur Reykjavík	6 - 0
Keflavík ÍF	Knattspyrnufélagið Þróttur B	13 - 0

== Third round ==
Team 1	Team 2	Result
ÍB Isafjörður	Fram Reykjavík	forfeit
Keflavík ÍF	Knattspyrnufélagið Þróttur	3 - 2

== Quarter finals ==
- Entrance of 6 clubs from 1. Deild

Team 1	Team 2	Result
Keflavík ÍF	ÍB Akureyri (D1)	2 - 1
KR Reykjavík (D1)	ÍB Hafnarfjörður (D1)	2 - 0
ÍA Akranes (D1)	Fram Reykjavík B	3 - 0
Fram Reykjavík (D1)	Valur Reykjavík (D1)	3 - 0

== Semi finals ==
Team 1	Team 2	Result
KR Reykjavík	Fram Reykjavík	2 - 1
IA Akranes	Keflavík ÍF (D2)	2 - 1

== Final ==
22 October 1961

KR Reykjavík	4–3	Fram Reykjavík
Felixson, Jonsson,	Report	Jonsson, Hakonarsson

Melavöllur, Reykjavík

== See also ==
- 1961 Úrvalsdeild
- Icelandic Cup
