= 1957 Úrvalsdeild =

Úrvalsdeild
- Season: 1957

Statistics of Úrvalsdeild in the 1957 season.

== Overview ==
It was contested by 6 teams, and ÍA won the championship. ÍA's Þórður Þórðarson was the top scorer with 6 goals.

== Final league table ==
Pos	Team	Pld	W	D	L	GF	GA	GD	Pts
1	ÍA (C)	5	5	0	0	14	2	+12	10
2	Fram	5	3	1	1	7	3	+4	7
3	Valur	5	2	2	1	11	7	+4	6
4	ÍBH	5	1	1	3	5	9	−4	3
5	KR	5	0	2	3	3	10	−7	2
6	ÍBA (R)	5	0	2	3	6	15	−9	2

Source: rsssf.com
Rules for classification: 1) points; 2) goal difference; 3) number of goals scored.
(C) Champions; (R) Relegated

== Results ==
Home \ Away	FRA	ÍBA	ÍA	ÍBH	KR	VAL
Fram		2–0	1–2	2–0	1–0	1–1
ÍBA			0–3	2–2	2–2	2–6
ÍA				1–0	4–0	4–1
ÍBH					3–1	0–3
KR						0–0
Valur						
