= 1955 Úrvalsdeild =

Úrvalsdeild
- Season: 1955

The 1955 Úrvalsdeild was the 44th season of league football in Iceland. KR won their 15th title. This was the first season that a team got relegated from the division, and Þróttur was the first team to drop down to the 2. deild karla. ÍA's Ríkharður Jónsson, Þórður Jónsson and Þórður Þórðarson were the joint top scorers with 7 goals.

== Final league table ==
Pos	Team	Pld	W	D	L	GF	GA	GD	Pts
1	KR (C)	5	4	1	0	21	3	+18	9
2	ÍA	5	4	0	1	23	7	+16	8
3	Valur	5	2	2	1	13	6	+7	6
4	Víkingur	5	2	0	3	9	20	−11	4
5	Fram	5	1	1	3	6	11	−5	3
6	Þróttur (R)	5	0	0	5	2	27	−25	0

Source: rsssf.com
Rules for classification: 1) points; 2) goal difference; 3) number of goals scored.
(C) Champions; (R) Relegated

1955 Úrvalsdeild winners
KR
15th title

== Results ==
Home \ Away	FRA	KR	VAL	VÍK	ÞRÓ	ÍA
Fram		0–3	0–0	3–4	3–1	0–3
KR			1–1	7–0	6–1	4–1
Valur				4–0	6–0	2–5
Víkingur					4–0	1–6
Þróttur						0–8
ÍA						
