= 1963 Icelandic Cup =

Sports event

Bikarkeppni karla

Tournament details
- Country: Iceland

Final positions
- Champions: KR
- Runners-up: ÍA

The 1963 Icelandic Cup was the fourth edition of the National Football Cup.

It took place between 10 August 1963 and 6 October 1963, with the final played at Melavöllur in Reykjavík. Teams from the Úrvalsdeild karla (1st division) did not enter until the quarter finals. In prior rounds, teams from the 2. Deild (2nd division), as well as reserve teams, played in one-legged matches. In case of a draw, the match was replayed.

For the fourth consecutive year, KR Reykjavík reached the final, beating IA Akranes 4 - 1.

== First round ==
Team 1	Team 2	Result
þrottur Reykjavík B	KR Reykjavík B	9 - 2
IA Akranes B	Valur Reykjavík B	2 - 0
IB Isafjördur	Breiðablik UBK	2 - 1
Víkingur Reykjavík	Keflavík ÍF B	1 - 0

== Second round ==
- Entrance of þrottur Reykjavík, ÍBV Vestmannaeyjar, ÍB Hafnarfjörður and Fram Reykjavík B.

Team 1	Team 2	Result
ÍB Hafnarfjörður	Fram Reykjavík B	4 - 1 (replayed after 2–2 draw)
ÍBV Vestmannaeyjar	þrottur Reykjavík	5 - 1
IA Akranes B	IB Isafjördur	5 - 0
Víkingur Reykjavík	þrottur Reykjavík B	2- 1

== Third round ==
Team 1	Team 2	Result
ÍB Hafnarfjörður	ÍBV Vestmannaeyjar	1 - 3
IA Akranes B	Víkingur Reykjavík	2 - 1

== Quarter finals ==
- Entrance of 6 clubs from 1. Deild

Team 1	Team 2	Result
ÍB Akureyri (D1)	Keflavík ÍF (D1)	0 - 2
IA Akranes B	KR Reykjavík (D1)	2 - 3
Fram Reykjavík (D1)	IA Akranes (D1)	1 - 4
Valur Reykjavík (D1)	ÍBV Vestmannaeyjar	2 - 0

== Semi finals ==
Team 1	Team 2	Result
KR Reykjavík	Keflavík ÍF	3 - 2
IA Akranes	Valur Reykjavík	6 - 1

== Final ==
6 October 1963

KR Reykjavík	4–1	IA Akranes
Jacobsson, Gudmannsson; Felixson	Report	þordarsson

Melavöllur, Reykjavík

== See also ==
- 1963 Úrvalsdeild
- Icelandic Cup
