= Þórður Þórðarson =

Þórður Þórðarson may refer to:

- Þórður Þórðarson (footballer, born 1930) (1930–2002), Icelandic international footballer who spent his career with ÍA
- Þórður Þórðarson (footballer, born 1972), Icelandic international footballer who is currently the manager of ÍA
