= 1954 Úrvalsdeild =

Úrvalsdeild
- Season: 1954

Statistics of Úrvalsdeild in the 1954 season.

== Overview ==
It was contested by 6 teams, and ÍA won the championship. ÍA's Ríkharður Jónsson was the top scorer with 6 goals.

== Final league table ==
Pos	Team	Pld	W	D	L	GF	GA	GD	Pts
1	ÍA (C)	5	4	1	0	20	4	+16	9
2	KR	5	3	2	0	9	6	+3	8
3	Fram	5	2	1	2	21	11	+10	5
4	Valur	5	1	2	2	4	6	−2	4
5	Þróttur	5	1	1	3	5	22	−17	3
6	Víkingur	5	0	1	4	2	12	−10	1

Source: rsssf.com
Rules for classification: 1) points; 2) goal difference; 3) number of goals scored.
(C) Champions

== Results ==
Home \ Away	FRA	KR	VAL	VÍK	ÞRÓ	ÍA
Fram		2–3	1–1	4–0	12–2	2–5
KR			1–1	2–1	1–0	2–2
Valur				1–0	1–2	0–2
Víkingur					1–1	0–4
Þróttur						0–7
ÍA						
