= 1967–68 FC Basel season =

FC Basel
1967–68 season
- Chairman: Harry Thommen
- Manager: Helmut Benthaus
- Ground: St. Jakob Stadium, Basel
- Nationalliga A: 5th
- Swiss Cup: Round 5
- 1967–68 European Cup: First Round
- Cup of the Alps: 8th
- Top goalscorer: League: Roberto Frigerio (9); Helmut Hauser (9); Dieter Rüefli (9); All: Helmut Hauser (13)
- Highest home attendance: 37,000 on 31 March 1968 vs. Lugano
- Lowest home attendance: 5,000 on 18 May 1968 vs. Bellinzona
- Average home league attendance: 14,753

The 1967–68 season was Fussball Club Basel 1893's 74th season since their foundation. It was their 22nd consecutive season in the top flight of Swiss football following their promotion the season 1945–46. They played their home games in the St. Jakob Stadium. The Chairman of the board was Harry Thommen for the second consecutive year.

== Overview ==
=== Pre-season ===
Helmut Benthaus was the club player-manager for the third consecutive season. He and his team were the defending league champions. There were no big amaêndments to the squad, one reserve goalkeeper left and one reserve goalkeeper advanced to them and defender Manfred Schädler joined from local club FC Birsfelden and striker Dieter Rüefli joined from Winterthur. Basel played a total of 42 matches in this season. 26 of these games were in the domestic league, two were in the Swiss Cup, two were in the European Cup, five were in the Cup of the Alps and seven were friendly matches. Of these seven test games five were won and two ended with a draw.

=== Domestic league ===
There were 14 teams contesting in the 1967–68 Nationalliga A. These were the top 12 teams from the previous 1966–67 season and the two newly promoted teams Luzern and Bellinzona. Basel, as reigning champions, played a mediocre season. Although they were within reach of the table top all the time, they messed everything up towards the end of the season as they lost five games out of seven. Therefore they finished the season in fifth position. They were seven points behind the trio Zürich, Grasshopper Club and Lugano who all ended the season with 38 points. These three team then had to play a championship play-off round and Zürich won both games and became champions. Basel won 13 of the league 26 games, drawing five, losing eight times, and they scored 49 goals conceding 33. The trio Roberto Frigerio, Helmut Hauser and Dieter Rüefli were the team's top goal scorers in the domestic league, each netted nine times.

=== Swiss Cup ===
In the Swiss Cup Basel started in the round of 32 with a home match against lower classed FC Le Locle. But the game had to go into overtime. After Le Locle took the lead just after half time break, Frigerio netted the equaliser shortly before the end. In the overtime player-manager Helmut Benthaus managed the winning goal. In the next round Basel played an away game against FC Zürich, but were defeated 0–1 and this campaign was ended very quickly.

=== European Cup ===
As reigning champions Basel were qualified for the 1967–68 European Cup. In the first round they were drawn against Danish team Hvidovre. The first leg was in the St. Jakob Stadium. Despite an early lead scored by Hauser, the Danes turned the game and won. In the return leg in stadium Idrætsparken in Copenhagen, Hauser again scored the early lead. Again the Dames turned the match and shortly after half time went into a 3–1 lead. This time Basel were fighting against the defeat and drew level at 3–3 but could not manage to score a winning goal, which would have put them through to the next round.

== Players ==
Note: Flags indicate national team as defined under FIFA eligibility rules; some limited exceptions apply. Players may hold more than one non-FIFA nationality.

No.	Pos.	Nation	Player
1	GK	SUI	Marcel Kunz
2	DF	SUI	Markus Pfirter
3	DF	SUI	Bruno Michaud
4	MF	SUI	Peter Ramseier
5	DF	SUI	Hanspeter Stocker
6	MF	SUI	Karl Odermatt
7	MF	SUI	Anton Schnyder
8	MF	GER	Helmut Benthaus
9	FW	GER	Helmut Hauser
9	FW	SUI	Roberto Frigerio
10	FW	SUI	Dieter Rüefli (from Winterthur)
11	FW	SUI	Peter Wenger
—	GK	SUI	Hans-Ruedi Günthardt

No.	Pos.	Nation	Player
—	GK	FRA	Jean-Paul Laufenburger
—	GK	SUI	Herbert Stierli (new)
—	DF	GER	Josef Kiefer
—	DF	SUI	Walter Mundschin
—	DF	SUI	Roland Paolucci
—	DF	SUI	Manfred Schädler (from FC Birsfelden)
—	MF	SUI	Werner Decker (reserve team)
—	MF	SUI	Otto Demarmels
—	FW	HUN	Janos Konrad (reserve team)
—	MF	SUI	Aldo Moscatelli
—	MF	SUI	Urs Siegenthaler
—	MF	SUI	Bruno Rahmen
—	FW	SUI	Hanspeter Vetter

Players who left the squad

Note: Flags indicate national team as defined under FIFA eligibility rules; some limited exceptions apply. Players may hold more than one non-FIFA nationality.

No.	Pos.	Nation	Player
—	GK	SUI	Heini Degen (reserve team)

== Results ==
Legend

Win Draw Loss Postponed

=== Friendly matches ===
==== Pre-season ====
29 July 1967 Pre-season	Karlsruher SC (West Germany)	3–3	(Switzerland) Basel	Wildparkstadion, Karlsruhe
	Kafka 5' (1:0); Hausser 9' (2:1); Zaczyk 23' (3:3)	Summary	7' (1:1) Frigerio; 15' (2:2) Rüefli; 17' (2:3) Odermatt	Attendance: 18,000; Referee: (West Germany) Eisenmann

2 August 1967 Pre-season	SV Schopfheim (West Germany)	1–8	(Switzerland) Basel	Oberfeldstadion, Schopfheim
	Goal	Summary	(4x) Rüefli (2x) Frigerio (1x) Hauser (1x) Odermatt

5 August 1967 Pre-season	Basel (Switzerland)	2–2	(Czech Republic) SK Slavia Prague	St. Jakob Stadium, Basel
20:00	Frigerio 67' (1:1); Hauser 74' (2:1)	Summary	8' (0:1) Novak; 79' (2:2) Vesely	Attendance: 6,500; Referee: (Switzerland) Eugen Boller Bottmingen

==== Winter break and mid-season ====
11 February 1968 Winter break	Basel (Switzerland)	4–0	(Switzerland) St. Gallen	Landhof, Basel
14:30	Rüefli 29' (1:0); Ramseier 59' (2:0); Hauser 70' (3:0); Rüefli 88' (4:0)	Summary		Attendance: 3,000; Referee: (Switzerland) J. Heymann Arlesheim

18 February 1968 Winter break	Basel (Switzerland)	4–0	(Switzerland) Schaffhausen	Landhof, Basel
14:30	Rüefli 6' (1:0); Rüefli 30' (2:0); Mundschin 31' (3:0); Rüefli 85' (4:0)	Summary		Attendance: 1,300; Referee: (Switzerland) H. R. Keller Basel

24 February 1968 Pre-season	Basel (Switzerland)	4–0	(Switzerland) Solothurn	Landhof, Basel
	Ramseier 9' (1:0); Rüefli 10' (2:0); Ramseier 41' (3:0); Odermatt 73' (4:0)	Summary		Attendance: 300; Referee: (Switzerland) Peter Hänggi Aesch

16 March 1968 Mid-season	Thun (Switzerland)	1–4	(Switzerland) Basel	Stadion Lachen, Thun
	Balmer 5' (1:0)	Summary	23' (1:1) Rüefli; 48' (1:2) Hauser; 48' (1:3) Rüefli; 66' (1:4) Hauser	Attendance: 1,000; Referee: (Switzerland) Gerber Langenthal

=== Nationalliga A ===
==== League matches ====
20 August 1967 Round 1	Luzern	4–2	Basel	Stadion Allmend, Luzern
16:00	Richter 1' (1:0); Richter 14' (2:0); Wechselberger 63' (3:2); Bertschi 90+1' (4:2)	Summary	43' (2:1) Hauser; 54' (2:2) Odermatt	Attendance: 13,500; Referee: (Switzerland) Rudolf Scheurer Bettlach

27 August 1967 Round 2	Sion	0–0	Basel	Parc des Sports, Sion
16:00		Summary		Attendance: 5,000; Referee: (Switzerland) Roland Keller Bern

2 September 1967 Round 3	Basel	3–1	Grenchen	St. Jakob Stadium, Basel
20:00	Hauser 39' (1:0); Pfirter 49' (2:0); Rüefli 83' (3:0)	Summary	88' (3:1) Amez-Droz	Attendance: 11,000; Referee: (Switzerland) Luigi Grassi Novazzano

9 September 1967 Round 4	Lugano	4–2	Basel	Cornaredo, Lugano
20:45	Brenna 12' (1:0); Brenna 39' (2:0); Chiesa 42' (3:0); Luttrop 81' (4:1)	Summary	64' (o.g. 3:1) Egli; 85' (pen. 4:2) Hauser	Attendance: 13,500; Referee: (Switzerland) Mario Clematide Zollikofen

16 September 1967 Round 5	Basel	1–0	Young Fellows Zürich	Landhof, Basel
16:00	Demarmels 47' (1:0)	Summary		Attendance: 6,800; Referee: (Switzerland) Roland Marendaz Lausanne

24 September 1967 Round 6	Zürich	1–4	Basel	Letzigrund, Zürich
16:00	Winiger 48' (1:1)	Summary	11' (0:1) Hauser; 76' (1:2) Wenger; 80' (1:3) Wenger; 86' (1:4) Demarmels	Attendance: 9,500; Referee: (Switzerland) A. Ceretti Biel/Bienne

8 October 1967 Round 7	Basel	2–0	Lausanne-Sport	St. Jakob Stadium, Basel
15:00	Frigerio 44' (1:0); Odermatt (yellow card) 79'; Frigerio 80' (2:0)	Summary		Attendance: 16,000; Referee: (Switzerland) Marcel Schneuwly Fribourg

15 October 1967 Round 8	La Chaux-de-Fonds	3–2	Basel	Stade Charrière, La Chaux-de-Fonds
15:00	Zappella 51' (1:1); Jeandupeux 65' (2:2); Clerc 90' (3:2)	Summary	32' (0:1) Frigerio; 54' (1:2) Frigerio	Attendance: 5,000; Referee: (Switzerland) Rudolf Scheurer Bettlach

22 October 1967 Round 9	Basel	4–0	Biel-Bienne	St. Jakob Stadium, Basel
15:00	Hauser 6' (1:0); Odermatt 24' (2:0); Rüefli 33' (3:0); Demarmels 67' (4:0)	Summary		Attendance: 13,000; Referee: (Switzerland) Josef Zibung Luzern

26 October 1967 Round 10	Bellinzona	0–0	Basel	Stadio Comunale Bellinzona
15:00		Summary		Attendance: 9,000; Referee: (Switzerland) Roland Marendaz Lausanne

5 November 1967 Round 11	Basel	4–0	Young Boys	St. Jakob Stadium, Basel
14:45	Frigerio 6' (1:0); Odermatt 12' (2:0); Frigerio 54' (3:0); Benthaus 61' (4:0)	Summary		Attendance: 14,000; Referee: (Switzerland) Marcel Schneuwly Fribourg

26 November 1967 Round 12	Grasshopper Club	1–1	Basel	Hardturm, Zürich
14:30	Aerni 85' (1:1)	Summary	50' (0:1) Hauser	Attendance: 19,000; Referee: (Switzerland) Mario Clematide Zollikofen

3 December 1967 Round 13	Basel	1–0	Servette	St. Jakob Stadium, Basel
14:30	Hauser 64' (pen.); Hauser (yellow card) 85'	Summary	(yellow card) 64' Barlie; (yellow card) 64' Maffiolo; (yellow card) 79' Pazmandy	Attendance: 13,500; Referee: (Switzerland) Roland Keller Bern

3 March 1968 Round 14	Basel	3–0	Luzern	St. Jakob Stadium, Basel
14:30	Wenger 12' (1:0); Benthaus 34' (2:0); Rüefli 64' (3:0)	Summary		Attendance: 12,500; Referee: (Switzerland) Mario Clematide Zollikofen

10 March 1968 Round 15	Basel	2–2	Sion	St. Jakob Stadium, Basel
14:30	Rüefli 22' (1:0); Frigerio 56' (2:1)	Summary	26' (1:1) Savary; 88' (2:2) Bruttin	Attendance: 11,000; Referee: (Switzerland) Marcel Despland Yverdon

24 March 1968 Round 16	Grenchen	0–1	Basel	Stadion Brühl, Grenchen
15:00		Summary	4' (1:0) Rüefli	Attendance: 7,000; Referee: (Switzerland) Roland Marendaz Lausanne

31 March 1968 Round 17	Basel	1–1	Lugano	St. Jakob Stadium, Basel
15:00	Rüefli 75' (1:0)	Summary	76' (1:1) Chiesa	Attendance: 37,000 (new record for Swiss football); Referee: (Switzerland) Gilbert Droz Marin

7 April 1968 Round 18	Young Fellows Zürich	2–4	Basel	Letzigrund, Zürich
14:00	Chiandussi 6' (1:0); Matus 86' (2:3)	Summary	58' (1:1) Wenger; 67' (1:2) Wenger; 75' (1:3) Demarmels; 90' (2:4) Odermatt	Attendance: 8,000; Referee: (Switzerland) Anton Bucheli Luzern

21 April 1968 Round 19	Basel	1–2	Zürich	St. Jakob Stadium, Basel
15:00	Rüefli 15' (1:0)	Summary	40' (1:1) Künzli; 47' (1:2) Künzli	Attendance: 28,000; Referee: (Switzerland) Rudolf Scheurer Bettlach

27 April 1968 Round 20	Lausanne-Sport	3–1	Basel	Olympique de la Pontaise, Lausanne
20:30	Hosp 6' (1:0); Vuilleumier 10' (2:0); Vuilleumier 76' (3:0)	Summary	(yellow card) 65' Benthaus; 78' (pen. 3:1) Frigerio	Attendance: 8,000; Referee: (Switzerland) Marcel Schneuwly Fribourg

4 May 1968 Round 21	Basel	3–1	La Chaux-de-Fonds	St. Jakob Stadium, Basel
20:15	Hauser 13' (1:0); Frigerio 16' (2:0); Benthaus 49' (3:0)	Summary	60' (3:1) Duvoisin; (yellow card) 88' Duvoisin	Attendance: 7,000; Referee: (Switzerland) Mario Clematide Zollikofen

11 May 1968 Round 22	Biel-Bienne	4–1	Basel	Gurzelen Stadion, Biel/Bienne
15:00	Gnägi 1' (1:0); Renfer 15' (2:0); Gnägi 37' (3:1); Matter 90' (4:1)	Summary	36' (2:1) Paolucci; (yellow card) 83' Kiefer	Attendance: 6,500; Referee: (Switzerland) Fernand Burioli Lausanne

18 May 1968 Round 23	Basel	1–0	Bellinzona	St. Jakob Stadium, Basel
20:15	Rüefli 54' (1:0)	Summary		Attendance: 5,000; Referee: (Switzerland) Marcel Despland Yverdon

25 May 1968 Round 24	Young Boys	3–2	Basel	Wankdorf Stadium, Bern
20:15	Grosser 40' (1:0); Guggisberg 33' (2:1); Kellas 82' (3:2)	Summary	32' (1:1) Rüefli; 40' (pen. 2:2) Hauser; (yellow card) Ramseier	Attendance: 5,000; Referee: (Switzerland) Werner Mettler St. Gallen

1 June 1968 Round 25	Basel	0–1	Grasshopper Club	St. Jakob Stadium, Basel
20:15	Kiefer (red card) 3'; Hauser (penalty missed) 62′	Summary	82' (0:1) Grahn	Attendance: 17,000; Referee: (Switzerland) Marcel Schneuwly Fribourg

8 June 1968 Round 26	Servette	0–3	Basel	Charmilles Stadium, Geneva
20:15		Summary	24' (0:1) Demarmels; 51' (0:2) Wenger; 89' (0:3) Demarmels	Attendance: 3,800; Referee: (Switzerland) Mario Clematide Zollikofen

==== League standings ====
Pos	Team	Pld	W	D	L	GF	GA	GD	Pts	Qualification
1	FC Zürich (C)	26	16	6	4	63	27	+36	38	Swiss Champions, qualified for 1968–69 European Cup
2	Grasshopper Club Zürich	26	17	4	5	54	23	+31	38	
3	FC Lugano	26	17	4	5	53	30	+23	38	Swiss Cup winners, qualified for 1968–69 Cup Winners' Cup and entered 1968 Intertoto Cup
4	Lausanne Sports	26	13	6	7	67	43	+24	32	Entered 1968 Intertoto Cup
5	FC Basel	26	13	5	8	49	33	+16	31	
6	FC Lucerne	26	12	4	10	51	58	−7	28	
7	FC Biel-Bienne	26	10	5	11	43	45	−2	25	Entered 1968 Intertoto Cup
8	BSC Young Boys	26	9	7	10	37	43	−6	25	
9	FC Sion	26	7	10	9	31	41	−10	24	
10	FC La Chaux-de-Fonds	26	8	6	12	40	49	−9	22	Entered 1968 Intertoto Cup
11	Servette FC Genève	26	8	5	13	40	42	−2	21	
12	AC Bellinzona	26	8	5	13	26	40	−14	21	Entered 1968 Intertoto Cup
13	Young Fellows Zürich	26	3	6	17	21	58	−37	12	Relegated to Nationalliga B
14	FC Grenchen	26	3	3	20	19	62	−43	9	Relegated to Nationalliga B

Source: rsssf.com
(C) Champions

=== Swiss Cup ===
12 November 1967 Round of 32	Basel	2–1 (a.e.t.)	FC Le Locle	St. Jakob-Park, Basel
15:15	Frigerio 83' (1:1); Benthaus 108' (2:1)	Summary	49' (0:1) Bosset	Attendance: 9,300; Referee: (Switzerland) W. Hardmeier Thalwil

10 December 1967 Round of 16	Zürich	1–0	Basel	Letzigrund, Zürich
14:30	Meyer 52' (1:0)	Summary		Attendance: 15,500; Referee: (Switzerland) Gilbert Droz Marin

=== European Cup ===
First round

20 September 1967 First leg	Basel (Switzerland)	1–2	(Denmark) Hvidovre	St. Jakob Stadium, Basel
20:00	Hauser 17' (1:0)	Report; FCB Summary	58' (1:1) Larsen; 80' (1:2) Sørensen	Attendance: 13,344; Referee: Gyula Emsberger (Hungary)

18 October 1967 Second leg	Hvidovre (Denmark)	3–3	(Switzerland) Basel	Idrætsparken, Copenhagen
19:00	Hansen 18'; Sørensen 39'; Olsen 58'	Report; FCB Summary	2' Hauser; (yellow card) 63' Benthaus; 78' Benthaus; 85' Wenger	Attendance: 9,363; Referee: Ken Dagnall (England)

Hvidovre won 5–4 on aggregate.

=== Cup of the Alps ===
==== Matches ====
14 June 1967 Round 1	Basel (Switzerland)	0–1	(Italy) Torino	St. Jakob Stadium, Basel
20:00		Summary	4' (0:1) Ferrini	Attendance: 8,000; Referee: (Switzerland) Pius Kamber Zürich

20 June 1967 Round 2	Basel (Switzerland)	0–2	(Italy) AS Roma	St. Jakob Stadium, Basel
20:00		Summary	7' (0:1) Barison; 76' (0:2) Barison	Attendance: 8,600; Referee: (Switzerland) Mario Clematide Zollikofen

23 June 1967 Round 3	Basel (Switzerland)	4–4	(West Germany) TSV 1860 Munich	St. Jakob Stadium, Basel
20:00	Hauser 8' (1:0); Rahmen 26' (2:1); Wenger 30' (3:1); Rüefli 33' (4:1)	Summary	19' (1:1) Bründl; 43' (4:2) Bründl; 43' (4:3) Küppers; 54' (4:4) Kohlars	Attendance: 9,000; Referee: (Switzerland) Gottfried Dienst, Basel

27 June 1967 Round 4	Basel (Switzerland)	0–3	(Italy) AC Milan	St. Jakob Stadium, Basel
20:00		Summary	25' (o.g.) Odermatt; 68' (0:2) Fortunato; 69' (0:3) Trapattoni	Attendance: 11,400; Referee: (Switzerland) Rudolf Scheurer Bettlach

15 August 1967 Round 5	Basel (Switzerland)	1–2	(West Germany) Eintracht Frankfurt	St. Jakob Stadium, Basel
20:00	Odermatt 76' (0:1)	Summary	53' (pen. 0:1) Solz; 74' (0:2) Bechtold	Attendance: 14,000; Referee: (Switzerland) Gilbert Droz Marin

==== Final table ====
Pos	Team	Pld	W	D	L	GF	GA	Pts
1	Eintracht Frankfurt	5	4	1	0	22	5	9
2	TSV 1860 Munich	5	2	3	0	11	8	7
3	AS Roma	5	3	0	2	12	10	6
4	Torino	5	1	3	1	3	3	5
5	Servette	5	2	1	2	5	7	5
6	AC Milan	5	1	2	2	3	3	4
7	Zürich	5	1	1	3	6	9	3
8	Basel	5	0	1	4	5	12	1

== See also ==
- History of FC Basel
- List of FC Basel players
- List of FC Basel seasons

== Sources ==
- Rotblau: Jahrbuch Saison 2015/2016. Publisher: FC Basel Marketing AG. ISBN 978-3-7245-2050-4
- Switzerland 1967–68 at RSSSF
- Cup of the Alps 1967 at RSSSF
