= 1958 Úrvalsdeild =

Úrvalsdeild
- Season: 1958

Statistics of Úrvalsdeild in the 1958 season.

== Overview ==
It was contested by 6 teams, and ÍA won the championship. ÍA's Þórður Þórðarson was the top scorer with 10 goals, the first time a player reached double digits in the Úrvalsdeild. This was the final season where single round would decide the championship

== Final league table ==
Pos	Team	Pld	W	D	L	GF	GA	GD	Pts
1	ÍA (C)	5	4	1	0	23	9	+14	9
2	KR	5	3	2	0	12	3	+9	8
3	Valur	5	3	0	2	10	12	−2	6
4	Keflavík	5	0	3	2	6	11	−5	3
5	Fram	5	0	2	3	8	12	−4	2
6	ÍBH (R)	5	0	2	3	7	19	−12	2

Source: rsssf.com
Rules for classification: 1) points; 2) goal difference; 3) number of goals scored.
(C) Champions; (R) Relegated

== Results ==
Home \ Away	FRA	ÍBH	ÍA	ÍBK	KR	VAL
Fram		2–2	4–6	2–2	0–1	0–1
ÍBH			1–3	1–1	0–7	3–6
ÍA				5–1	2–2	7–1
Keflavík					1–1	1–2
KR						1–0
Valur						
