= 1952 Úrvalsdeild =

Úrvalsdeild
- Season: 1952

Statistics of Úrvalsdeild in the 1952 season.

== Overview ==
It was contested by 5 teams, and KR won the championship. ÍA's Ríkharður Jónsson was the top scorer with 6 goals.

== Final league table ==
Pos	Team	Pld	W	D	L	GF	GA	GD	Pts
1	KR (C)	4	3	1	0	7	3	+4	7
2	ÍA	4	3	0	1	12	6	+6	6
3	Fram	4	2	0	2	8	9	−1	4
4	Valur	4	0	2	2	3	5	−2	2
5	Víkingur	4	0	1	3	3	10	−7	1

Source: rsssf.com
Rules for classification: 1) points; 2) goal difference; 3) number of goals scored.
(C) Champions

== Results ==
Home \ Away	FRA	KR	VAL	VÍK	ÍA
Fram		2–3	2–1	1–0	3–5
KR			1–1	2–0	1–0
Valur				1–1	0–1
Víkingur					2–6
ÍA					
