= 1960 Úrvalsdeild =

Úrvalsdeild
- Season: 1960
- Dates: May 26 – September 25
- Champions: ÍA (6th title)
- Relegated: Keflavík
- Matches played: 30
- Goals scored: 146 (4.87 per match)
- Top goalscorer: 15 goals: Ingvar Elísson; Þórólfur Beck

Statistics of Úrvalsdeild in the 1960 season.

== Overview ==
It was contested by 6 teams, and ÍA won the championship. ÍA's Ingvar Elísson and KR's Þórólfur Beck were the joint top scorers with 15 goals.

== Final league table ==
| Pos | Team | Pld | W | D | L | GF | GA | GD | Pts |
|---|---|---|---|---|---|---|---|---|---|
| 1 | ÍA (C) | 10 | 6 | 3 | 1 | 32 | 15 | +17 | 15 |
| 2 | KR | 10 | 6 | 1 | 3 | 41 | 15 | +26 | 13 |
| 3 | Fram | 10 | 4 | 3 | 3 | 21 | 24 | −3 | 11 |
| 4 | Valur | 10 | 3 | 4 | 3 | 14 | 25 | −11 | 10 |
| 5 | ÍBA | 10 | 3 | 0 | 7 | 24 | 35 | −11 | 6 |
| 6 | Keflavík (R) | 10 | 2 | 1 | 7 | 14 | 32 | −18 | 5 |

Source: rsssf.com
Rules for classification: 1) points; 2) goal difference; 3) number of goals scored.
(C) Champions; (R) Relegated

== Results ==
Each team played every opponent once home and away for a total of 10 matches.

| Home \ Away | FRA | ÍA | ÍBA | ÍBK | KR | VAL |
|---|---|---|---|---|---|---|
| Fram | | 3–3 | 3–2 | 2–4 | 3–2 | 2–2 |
| ÍA | 5–1 | | 7–1 | 3–0 | 3–5 | 1–1 |
| ÍBA | 6–3 | 1–3 | | 3–1 | 2–5 | 2–3 |
| Keflavík | 0–2 | 1–4 | 5–2 | | 0–5 | 0–1 |
| KR | 0–0 | 0–1 | 3–5 | 8–1 | | 6–0 |
| Valur | 1–2 | 2–2 | 2–1 | 2–2 | 0–7 | |

Legend: Blue = home team win; Yellow = draw; Red = away team win.
