= Hörður Felixson =

Icelandic footballer and handballer

Personal information
- Date of birth: 25 October 1931
- Place of birth: Reykjavík, Kingdom of Iceland
- Date of death: 29 August 2018 (aged 86)
- Place of death: Reykjavík, Iceland
- Position: Defender

Senior career*
Years	Team	Apps	(Gls)
1949–19??	Knattspyrnufélag Reykjavíkur		

International career
1958–1963	Iceland	11	(0)
- * Club domestic league appearances and goals

Hörður Felixson (25 October 1931 – 29 August 2018) was an Icelandic multi-sport athlete. He was part of the Iceland national football team between 1958 and 1963, playing 11 matches. He was a member of Knattspyrnufélag Reykjavíkur where he won several national championships and Cup titles. Hörður also played handball for several years, both with the Iceland national handball team and KR, where he won the national championship in 1958.

== Personal life and death ==
Hörður's brothers, Gunnar Felixson and Bjarni Felixson, both played with him on KR and the Icelandic national team. In 1963, all three brothers played together for Iceland in two games against England.

== See also ==
- List of Iceland international footballers
