= Manfred Schädler =

Swiss footballer (1944-2014)

Personal information
- Full name: Manfred Schädler
- Date of birth: 8 June 1944
- Date of death: 28 August 2014 (aged 70)
- Position: Defender

Senior career*
Years	Team	Apps	(Gls)
1966–1967	FC Birsfelden		
1967–1969	FC Basel	2	(0)
1969–1970	Concordia Basel		
- * Club domestic league appearances and goals

Manfred Schädler (8 June 1944 – 28 August 2014) was a Swiss footballer who played in the 1960s as midfielder.

Schädler first played for FC Birsfelden and joined FC Basel's first team for their 1967–68 season under player-manager Helmut Benthaus. Schädler played his domestic league debut for the club in the away game on 9 September 1967 as Basel were defeated 2–4 by Lugano.

Between the years 1967 and 1969 Schädler played a total of four games for Basel without scoring a goal. Two of these games were in the Nationalliga A and two were friendly games.

After his time with Basel, Schädler moved on to play for local club Concordia Basel in a lower league.

== Sources ==
- Die ersten 125 Jahre. Publisher: Josef Zindel im Friedrich Reinhardt Verlag, Basel. ISBN 978-3-7245-2305-5
- Verein "Basler Fussballarchiv" Homepage
