= Íþróttabandalag Akraness =

Icelandic sports club

ÍA
- Full name: Íþróttabandalag Akraness
- Nickname: Skagamenn,
- Short name: ÍA
- Founded: 1946; 80 years ago
- Ground: Akranesvöllur, Akranes, Iceland
- Capacity: 6,000 (852 seated)
- Chairman: Eggert Hjelm Herbertsson
- Manager: Lárus Sigurðsson
- League: Besta deild karla
- 2026: Besta deild karla, 4th of 12
- Website: ia.is
Home colours	Away colours

Íþróttabandalag Akraness (Icelandic pronunciation: [ˈiːˌθrouhtaˌpantaˌlaɣ ˈaːkraˌnɛs], lit. 'Akranes Sports Union'), commonly known as ÍA, is an Icelandic sports club founded in 1946 and based in the town of Akranes, Iceland. Among the main sports its members can practice are basketball, football, golf, horsemanship, gymnastics, volleyball, bowling, karate, badminton, swimming and powerlifting. The football team plays in yellow shirts and socks, and black shorts.

== Men's football ==
ÍA's men's football team currently plays in the Besta deild karla, the highest tier of Icelandic football.

ÍA is one of Iceland's most successful football teams with 18 Championships and 9 Cup wins to their name. The club is known for its academy and has produced many of Iceland's greatest talents, including Arnór Sigurðsson, Hákon Haraldsson, Joey Guðjónsson, Ísak Bergmann Jóhannesson, Stefán Teitur Þórðarson and Iceland national team's coach Arnar Bergmann Gunnlaugsson.

=== Honours ===
- Icelandic Championships: 18

1951, 1953, 1954, 1957, 1958, 1960, 1970, 1974, 1975, 1977, 1983, 1984, 1992, 1993, 1994, 1995, 1996, 2001
Runner-up: 1952, 1955, 1959, 1961, 1963, 1964, 1965, 1969, 1978, 1979, 1985, 1997

- Icelandic Cups: 9

1978, 1982, 1983, 1984, 1986, 1993, 1996, 2000, 2003
Runner-up: 1961, 1963, 1964, 1965, 1969, 1974, 1975, 1976, 1999, 2021

- Icelandic League Cups: 3

1996, 1999, 2003

- Icelandic Super Cup: 1

2003

- Division One: 5

1968, 1991, 2011, 2018, 2023

== Players ==
=== Current squad ===
As of 3 September 2026

Note: Flags indicate national team as defined under FIFA eligibility rules; some limited exceptions apply. Players may hold more than one non-FIFA nationality.

No.	Pos.	Nation	Player
1	GK	ISL	Árni Marinó Einarsson
3	DF	SWE	Johannes Vall
5	DF	ISL	Baldvin Þór Berndsen
7	MF	ISL	Haukur Andri Haraldsson
8	DF	ISL	Guðmundur Þórarinsson
9	FW	ISL	Viktor Jónsson
10	MF	ISL	Steinar Þorsteinsson
11	MF	ISL	Gísli Eyjólfsson
12	GK	ISL	Logi Mar Hjaltested
13	DF	NOR	Erik Tobias Sandberg
16	MF	ISL	Rúnar Már Sigurjónsson (captain)
17	FW	ISL	Gísli Laxdal Unnarsson
18	FW	ISL	Rafael Máni Þrastarson

No.	Pos.	Nation	Player
20	DF	ISL	Ísak Máni Guðjónsson
21	DF	ISL	Böðvar Böðvarsson
22	MF	ISL	Ómar Stefánsson
23	DF	ISL	Hilmar Elís Hilmarsson
25	FW	ISL	Markús Páll Ellertsson
26	FW	ISL	Matthías Daði Gunnarsson
27	MF	ISL	Brynjar Óðinn Atlason
28	MF	ISL	Daníel Michal Grzegorzsson
32	MF	ISL	Jón Breki Guðmundsson
44	FW	ISL	Gudmar Gauti Sævarsson
66	DF	ISL	Jón Gísli Eyland Gíslason
87	DF	ISL	Styrmir Ellertsson

=== Out on loan ===
Note: Flags indicate national team as defined under FIFA eligibility rules; some limited exceptions apply. Players may hold more than one non-FIFA nationality.

No.	Pos.	Nation	Player
14	MF	ISL	Breki Þór Hermannsson (at Vestri until 31 January 2027)
19	MF	ISL	Birnir Breki Burknason (at Leiknir Reykjavík until 31 January 2027)
33	MF	ISL	Arnór Valur Ágústsson (at Leiknir Reykjavík until 31 January 2027)

No.	Pos.	Nation	Player
37	GK	ISL	Jón Sölvi Símonarsson (at Lyngby Boldklub until 30 June 2027)
—	DF	ISL	Birkir Hrafn Samúelsson (at Kári until 31 January 2027)

=== Managers ===
- (Iceland) Karl Guðmundsson (1948)
- (Iceland) Ríkharður Jónsson (1951–60)
- (Iceland) Guðjón Finnbogason (1960)
- (Iceland) Ríkharður Jónsson (1961–66)
- (Iceland) Helgi Hannesson (1967–68)
- (Iceland) Ríkharður Jónsson (1969–70)
- (Iceland) Magnús Kristjánsson (1971)
- (Iceland) Ríkharður Jónsson (1972–73)
- (England) George Kirby (1974–75)
- (England) Mike Ferguson (1976)
- (England) George Kirby (1977–78)
- (Germany) Klaus Hilpert (1979)
- (England) George Kirby (1980)
- (England) Steve Fleet (1981)
- (England) George Kirby (1982)
- (Iceland) Hörður Helgason (1983–85)
- (England) Jim Barron (1986)
- (Iceland) Guðjón Þórðarson (1987)
- (Iceland) Sigurður Lárusson (1988–89)
- (England) George Kirby (1990)
- (Iceland) Guðjón Þórðarson (1991–93)
- (Iceland) Hörður Helgason (1994)
- (Iceland) Logi Ólafsson (1995)
- (Iceland) Guðjón Þórðarson (1996)
- (Federal Republic of Yugoslavia) Ivan Golac (1997)
- (Iceland) Logi Ólafsson (1997–99)
- (Iceland) Ólafur Þórðarson (1999–2006)
- (Iceland) Arnar Gunnlaugsson (2006)
- (Iceland) Bjarki Gunnlaugsson (2006)
- (Iceland) Guðjón Þórðarson (July 1, 2007 – July 21, 2008)
- (Iceland) Arnar Gunnlaugsson (July 2008 – July 9)
- (Iceland) Bjarki Gunnlaugsson (July 2008 – July 9)
- (Iceland) Þórður Þórðarson (July 16, 2009 – June 18, 2013)
- (Iceland) Þorvaldur Örlygsson (June 19, 2013 – Sept 28, 2013)
- (Iceland) Gunnlaugur Jónsson (Oct 10, 2013 - Aug 21, 2017)
- (Iceland) Jón Þór Hauksson (Aug 21, 2017 - Oct 1, 2017)
- (Iceland) Joey Guðjónsson (Oct 12, 2017 - Feb 1, 2022)
- (Iceland) Jón Þór Hauksson (Feb 1, 2022-)

=== European competition ===
Season	Competition	Round	Club	Home	Away	Aggregate
1970–71	Inter-Cities Fairs Cup	1R	(Netherlands) Sparta Rotterdam	0–6	0–9	0-15
1971–72	European Cup	1R	(Malta) Sliema Wanderers	0–4	0–0	0-4
1975–76	European Cup	1R	(Cyprus) Omonia	4–0	1–2	5–2
1975–76	European Cup	2R	(Soviet Union) Dynamo Kyiv	0–2	0–3	0-5
1976–77	European Cup	1R	(Turkey) Trabzonspor	1–3	2–3	3-6
1977–78	UEFA Cup Winners' Cup	1R	(Norway) Brann	0–4	0–1	0-5
1978–79	European Cup	1R	(Germany) Köln	1-1	1–4	2-5
1979–80	UEFA Cup Winners' Cup	1R	(Spain) Barcelona	0–1	0–5	0-6
1980–81	UEFA Cup	1R	(Germany) Köln	0–4	0–6	0-10
1983–84	UEFA Cup Winners' Cup	1R	(Scotland) Aberdeen	1–2	1-1	2-3
1984–85	European Cup	1R	(Belgium) Beveren	2-2	0–5	2-7
1985–86	European Cup	1R	(Scotland) Aberdeen	1–3	1–4	2-7
1986–87	UEFA Cup	1R	(Portugal) Sporting	0–9	0–6	0-15
1987–88	UEFA Cup Winners' Cup	1R	(Sweden) Kalmar	0-0	0-1 (aet)	0-1
1988–89	UEFA Cup	1R	(Hungary) Újpest	0-0	1–2	1-2
1989–90	UEFA Cup	1R	(Belgium) RFC Liège	0–2	1–4	1-6
1993–94	UEFA Champions League	PR	(Albania) Partizani	3–0	0-0	3–0
1993–94	UEFA Champions League	1R	(Netherlands) Feyenoord	1–0	0–3	1-3
1994–95	UEFA Cup	PR	(Wales) Bangor City	2–0	2–1	4–1
1994–95	UEFA Cup	1R	(Germany) Kaiserslautern	0–4	1–4	1-8
1995–96	UEFA Cup	PR	(Republic of Ireland) Shelbourne	3–0	3–0	6–0
1995–96	UEFA Cup	1R	(Scotland) Raith Rovers	1–0	1–3	2-3
1996–97	UEFA Cup	PR	(North Macedonia) Sileks	2–0	0–1	2–1
1996–97	UEFA Cup	QR	(Russia) CSKA Moscow	0–2	1–4	1-6
1997–98	UEFA Champions League	1R	(Slovakia) Košice	0–1	0–3	0-4
1998–99	UEFA Cup	1QR	(Lithuania) Žalgiris Vilnius	3–2	0–1	3-3 (a)
1999	UEFA Intertoto Cup	1R	(Albania) Teuta Durrës	5–1	1–2	6–3
1999	UEFA Intertoto Cup	2R	(Belgium) Lokeren	1–3	1–3	2-6
2000-01	UEFA Cup	QR	(Belgium) Gent	0–3	2–3	2-6
2001-02	UEFA Cup	QR	(Belgium) Club Brugge	1–6	0–4	1-10
2002-03	UEFA Champions League	1QR	(Bosnia and Herzegovina) Željezničar	0–1	0–3	0-4
2004-05	UEFA Cup	1QR	(Estonia) TVMK	4–2	2–1	6–3
2004-05	UEFA Cup	2QR	(Sweden) Hammarby	1–2	0–2	1-4
2005	UEFA Intertoto Cup	1R	(Finland) Inter Turku	0–4	0–0	0-4
2006-07	UEFA Cup	1QR	(Denmark) Randers	2–1	0–1	2-2 (a)
2008-09	UEFA Cup	1QR	(Finland) Honka	2–1	0–3	2-4

== Women's football ==
=== Current squad ===
As of 17 April 2022

Note: Flags indicate national team as defined under FIFA eligibility rules; some limited exceptions apply. Players may hold more than one non-FIFA nationality.

No.	Pos.	Nation	Player
1	GK	USA	Brooke Anne Jones
2	DF	ISL	Aníta Sól Ágústsdóttir
3	DF	USA	Jaclyn Árnason
5	DF	ISL	Anna Þóra Hannesdóttir
7	FW	ISL	Erla Karitas Jóhannesdóttir
8	MF	ISL	Lilja Björg Ólafsdóttir
9	FW	ISL	Erna Björt Elíasdóttir
10	MF	ISL	Bryndís Rún Þórólfsdóttir
11	MF	ISL	Dagný Halldórsdóttir
12	GK	ISL	Salka Hrafns Elvarsdóttir
14	MF	ISL	Dagbjört Líf Guðmundsdóttir
15	MF	ISL	Marey Edda Helgadóttir
16	DF	ISL	Arndís Lilja Eggertsdóttir

No.	Pos.	Nation	Player
17	FW	ISL	Unnur Ýr Haraldsdóttir
18	MF	ISL	Sunna Rún Sigurðardóttir
19	FW	ISL	Katrín María Ómarsdóttir
20	DF	ISL	Sandra Ósk Alfreðsdóttir
21	FW	ISL	Ylfa Laxdal Unnarsdóttir
22	DF	ISL	Selma Dögg Þorsteinsdóttir
23	FW	ISL	Andrea Ósk Hermóðsdóttir
25	DF	ISL	Sigrún Egla Unnarsdóttir
26	DF	ISL	Þorgerður Bjarnadóttir
27	DF	ISL	Elvíra Agla Gunnarsdóttir
28	FW	ISL	Thelma Björg Rafnkelsdóttir
29	FW	ISL	Kolfinna Eir Jónsdóttir
99	FW	GHA	Samira Suleman

=== Honours ===
- Icelandic Championships: 3

1984, 1985, 1987
Runner-up: 1981, 1988, 1989, 1992

- Icelandic Cups: 4

1989, 1991, 1992, 1993

== Basketball ==
ÍA's men's team played in the top-tier Úrvalsdeild karla from 1993 to 2000, making the playoffs in 1994, 1997 and 1998. Its women's team played one season in the top-tier Úrvalsdeild kvenna during the 1995–1996 season.
