= Arna Schram =

Icelandic journalist (1968–2022)

- Born: 15 March 1968; Reykjavík, Iceland
- Died: 11 January 2022 (aged 53); Reykjavík, Iceland
- Occupation: Journalist
- Children: Birna Ketilsdóttir Schram
- Relatives: Ellert Schram (father); Arnar Þór Jónsson (half brother)

Arna Schram (15 March 1968 – 11 January 2022) was an Icelandic journalist. She was the first woman to serve as the chairperson of the Union of Icelandic Journalists.

== Early life and education ==
Arna was born in Reykjavík to Ellert Schram and Anna Guðlaug Ásgeirsdóttir. She grew up in Reykjavík where she attended Vesturbæjarskóli and Hagaskóli. In 1988, she graduated from Menntaskólinn í Reykjavík. Arna graduated with a BA degree in political science and philosophy from the University of Iceland and the University of Copenhagen, as well as an MBA degree with an emphasis on management, operations and marketing from Reykjavík University.

== Journalism career ==
She started her journalism career with Dagblaðið Vísir but moved to Morgunblaðið in 1995. There she worked until 2006 as a journalist in the domestic news department, mostly as a parliamentary reporter but also served as evening news director for a while. She was the assistant editor at Krónikan for a short time and later a news editor at Viðskiptablaðið for three years.

Arna held numerous secretarial positions for the Union of Icelandic Journalists and was the vice chairperson of the Union from 2003 to 2005 and chairperson from 2005 to 2009.

== Later life and death ==
In 2010, Arna was hired as Kópavogur's information officer and a year later she became the town's director of cultural affairs. From the spring of 2017 until her death, she worked as the director of the City of Reykjavík's Department of Culture and Tourism.

Arna died at the National University Hospital of Iceland in Reykjavík, on 11 January 2022, at the age of 53.
