= Dieter Rüefli =

Swiss footballer (born 1943)

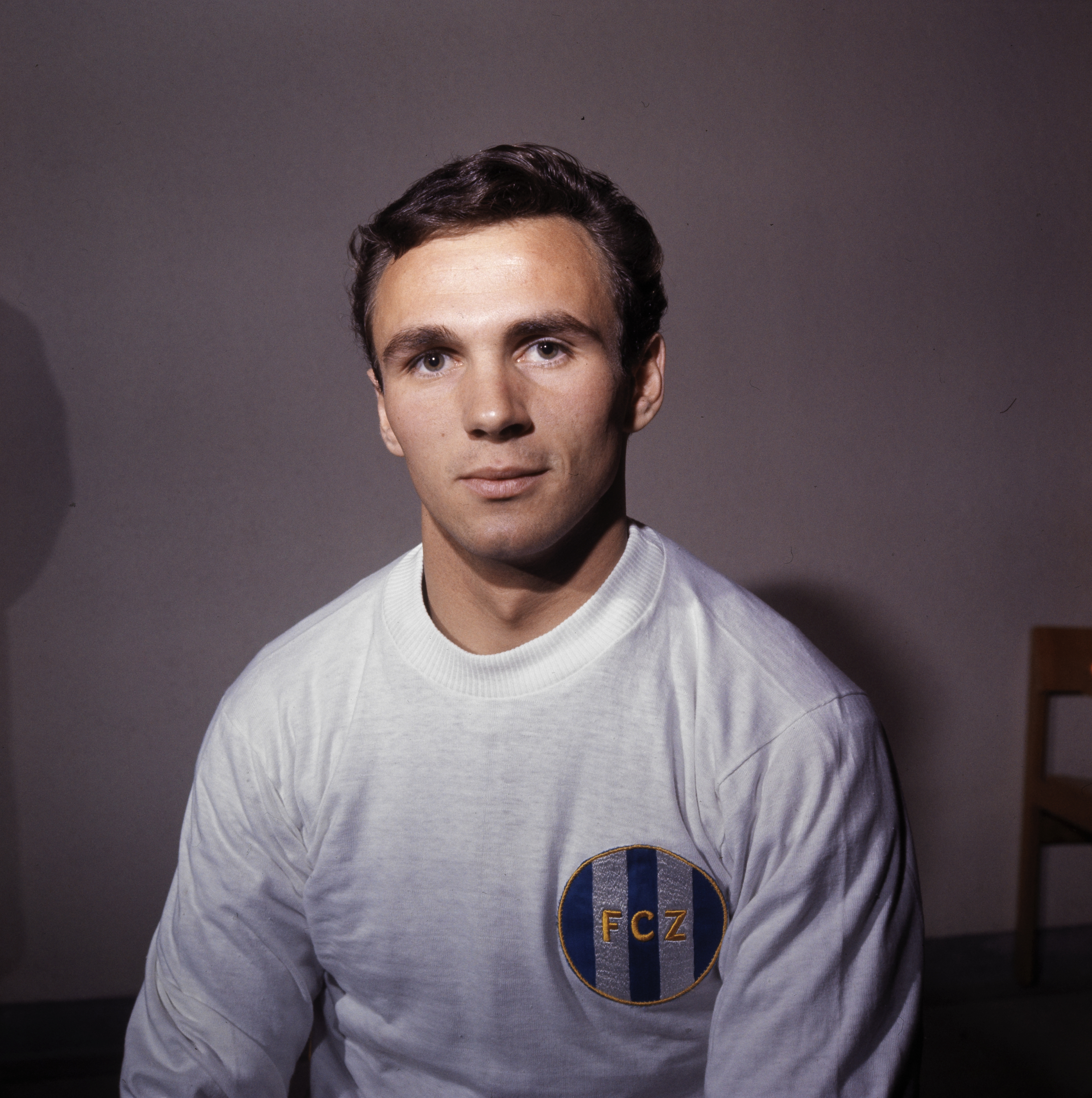
- Dieter Rüefli in 1963

Personal information
- Full name: Dieter Rüefli
- Date of birth: 9 September 1943 (age 83)
- Height: 1.70 m (5 ft 7 in)
- Position: Striker

Youth career
- until 1963: FC Schwamendingen

Senior career*
Years	Team	Apps	(Gls)
until 1963	FC Schwamendingen		
1963–1965	FC Zürich	24	(17)
1965–1967	FC Winterthur	46	(22)
1967–1970	FC Basel	35	(13)
1970–1972	FC St. Gallen	34	(14)
1972–	DJK Konstanz		
- * Club domestic league appearances and goals

Dieter Rüefli (born 9 September 1943) is a Swiss former footballer who played in the 1960s and early 1970s as a striker.

Rüefli played his youth football with FC Schwamendingen and advanced to the first team aged just 15 years.

FC Zürich scouted him and gave him a contract for the 1963–64 Nationalliga A season. His start with his new club was hesitant due to his first meniscus injury and operation. But in this season Rüefli played 12 domestic league matches, scoring 13 league goals. He also played in the European Cup quarter final against PSV Eindhoven and scored the winning goal as Zürich qualified for the semi-final. Rüefli played two seasons for Zürich.

In the summer of 1965 Rüfli moved on to play for Winterthur who had just been relegated to the Nationalliga B (second tier of Swiss football). Rüfli and Winterthur won immediate promotion. Rüefli played two seasons for Winterthur.

In the summer of 1967 Rüfli joined FC Basel's first team for their 1967–68 season under player-manager Helmut Benthaus. After playing in five games in the Cup of the Alps and three test games, Rüfli played his domestic league debut for his new club on 20 August 1967 as Basel lost 4–2 away to Luzern. He scored his first league goal for his club on 2 September in the home game at St. Jakob Stadium as Basel won 3–1 against Grenchen.

In his three seasons with the club Rüfli won the Swiss Championship twice. In his third season he played only a few matches due to another meniscus injury and operation. During this time he played 67 games for Basel scoring 40 goals. 35 of these games were in the Nationalliga A, 11 in the European competitions ( Cup of the Alps and Inter-Cities Fairs Cup), two in the Swiss Cup and 19 were friendly games. He scored 13 goals in the domestic league, one in the Cup of the Alps and the other 26 were scored during the 19 test games.

Following his time with Basel, Schnyder moved on to St. Gallen who had just suffered relegation to the Nationalliga B. Rüfli and St. Gallen won immediate promotion. Rüefli played two seasons for St. Gallen. But because of his recurring injuries he moved on to play for DJK Konstanz and to end his active career in the highest German amateur league.

Rüfli was called up for the Swiss national team once, but did not play for them. The reason is extraordinary: Rüfli dislocated his right shoulder several times during his playing career, which is why he was unable to take side line throw ins. "This handicap was not tolerated by the national coaches", he said himself.

== Sources ==
- Die ersten 125 Jahre. Publisher: Josef Zindel im Friedrich Reinhardt Verlag, Basel. ISBN 978-3-7245-2305-5
- Verein "Basler Fussballarchiv" Homepage
- Dieter Rüefli portrait by dbFCZ online
- tagblatt.ch Ostschweiz
