= Helgi Númason =

Icelandic footballer

Personal information
- Date of birth: 17 September 1946 (age 80)
- Place of birth: Reykjavík, Iceland
- Position: Forward

Senior career*
Years	Team	Apps	(Gls)
1963–?	Fram		

International career
1967	Iceland	2	(1)
- * Club domestic league appearances and goals

Helgi Númason (born 17 September 1946) is an Icelandic former footballer who played as a forward. He was part of the Iceland national football team in 1967. He made two appearances, scoring one goal. On club level, he started his senior team in 1963 with Knattspyrnufélagið Fram. He was the joint topscorer of the 1968 Úrvalsdeild with eight goals, along with Kári Árnason, Ólafur Lárusson and Reynir Jónsson.

== See also ==
- List of Iceland international footballers
