= John Worbye =

Danish footballer (1941–1996)

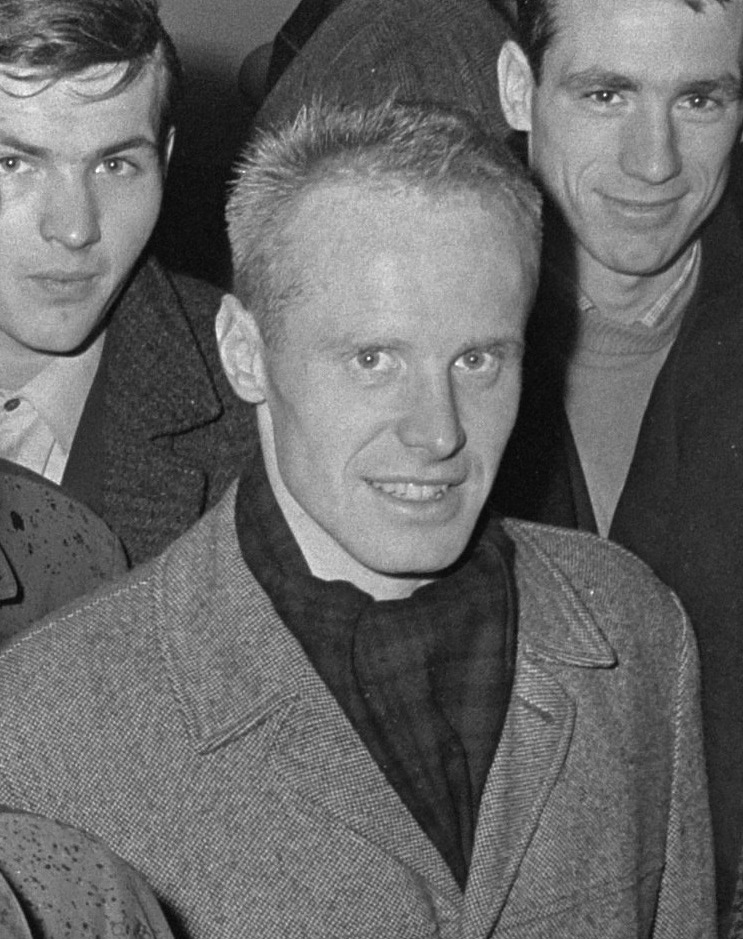
- Worbye in 1966

Personal information
- Full name: John Flemming Worbye
- Date of birth: 27 January 1941
- Place of birth: Frederiksberg, Denmark
- Date of death: 13 September 1996 (aged 55)
- Position: Left-back

Youth career
- Hvidovre

Senior career*
Years	Team	Apps	(Gls)
1963–1967	Hvidovre	105	(0)
1968	Washington Whips	32	(0)
1970–1971	Karlskoga		
1972–1973	Hvidovre	16	(0)
Total		153+	(0)

International career
1966–1967	Denmark	12	(0)
- * Club domestic league appearances and goals

John Flemming Worbye (27 January 1941 – 13 September 1996) was a Danish footballer who played as a left-back.

== Club career ==
Born in Frederiksberg, Worbye spent most of his career at Hvidovre, having played as a goalkeeper for the youth team. When they brought in fellow goalkeeper Jørgen Henriksen from Dalgas, Worbye switched to left back in order to remain in the team, as transferring between clubs was rare in the amateur era of Danish football. Hvidovre had benefitted from the migration of families from central Copenhagen to the western suburbs after World War II, and the club won the league in 1966 with ten players who had been in the youth team. In the 1967–68 European Cup, he was part of the team that eliminated Switzerland's Basel in the first round and held six-time winners Real Madrid 2–2 in the second round before losing 6–3 on aggregate.

In 1968, Worbye played for the Washington Whips of the North American Soccer League. He played all 32 games as the club finished second in the Eastern Conference, and was named in the All-Star Second Team.

== International career ==
Worbye won 12 international caps for Denmark, starting with a 6–0 loss away to Hungary on 21 September 1966 in UEFA Euro 1968 qualifying. He was the captain from his fifth game onwards, including a 14–2 friendly win over Iceland on 23 August 1967 at Københavns Idrætspark.
