= Jack Mansell =

English football player and manager (1927–2016)

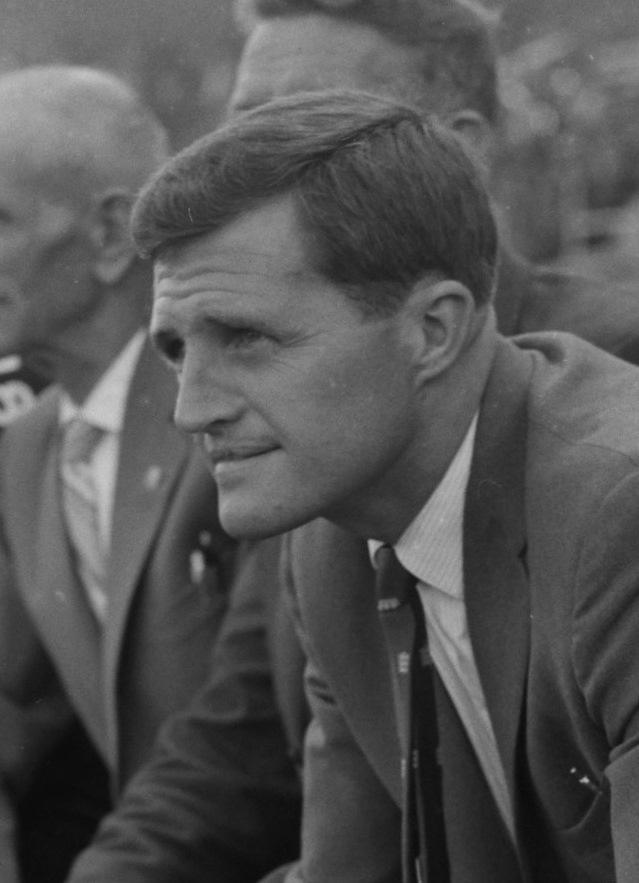
- Mansell in 1961

Personal information
- Full name: Jack Mansell
- Date of birth: 22 August 1927
- Place of birth: Salford, England
- Date of death: 19 March 2016 (aged 88)
- Position: Defender

Youth career
- Manchester United

Senior career*
Years	Team	Apps	(Gls)
1948–1952	Brighton & Hove Albion	116	(9)
1952–1953	Cardiff City	24	(0)
1953–1958	Portsmouth	134	(7)
Total		174	(16)

International career
	England B	2	(0)

Managerial career
- 1961–1962: Blauw-Wit Amsterdam
- 1964–1965: Stormvogels Telstar
- 1965–1967: Rotherham United
- 1968: Boston Beacons
- 1969–1971: Reading
- 1972–1974: Iraklis Thessaloniki
- 1974–1975: Galatasaray
- 1978–1979: Bahrain
- 1980–1981: Israel
- 1982–1983: Maccabi Haifa
- * Club domestic league appearances and goals

Jack Mansell (22 August 1927 – 19 March 2016) was a professional football player and coach. He made 274 appearances in the Football League as a defender for Brighton & Hove Albion, Cardiff City and Portsmouth. After retiring as a player, he joined the coaching staff at Sheffield Wednesday. There, in early April 1964, he became interim manager after the sacking of Vic Buckingham. He coached many clubs with his longest spell being at Reading and had experience overseas with the likes of Blauw-Wit Amsterdam, Boston Beacons and the Israel national team. In 1982, Mansell was chosen to train Maccabi Haifa, after a year at the Israel national team. Mansell died on 19 March 2016.
