= Jørgen Henriksen =

Danish footballer (born 1942)

Personal information
- Date of birth: 16 July 1942 (age 84)
- Place of birth: Frederiksberg, Denmark
- Height: 1.83 m (6 ft 0 in)
- Position: Goalkeeper

Senior career*
Years	Team	Apps	(Gls)
1965–1967	Hvidovre IF		
1968	Boston Beacons	16	(0)
1970–1976	FC Utrecht	146	(0)
1976–1978	Hvidovre IF		

International career
1967–1972	Denmark	5	(0)
- * Club domestic league appearances and goals

Jørgen Henriksen (born 16 July 1942) is a Danish former footballer who played as a goalkeeper. He made five appearances for the Denmark national team from 1967 to 1972.

Henriksen joined Hvidovre from Dalgas at a time when transfers between Danish clubs were rare. John Worbye, who had played as the club's goalkeeper through the youth teams, had to convert to being a left back to remain in the team, eventually becoming a club and international regular in the position.
