= Þórður Þórðarson (footballer, born 1972) =

Icelandic footballer

Personal information
- Full name: Þórður Þórðarson
- Date of birth: 10 April 1972 (age 54)
- Place of birth: Akranes, Iceland
- Height: 1.85 m (6 ft 1 in)
- Position: Goalkeeper

Senior career*
Years	Team	Apps	(Gls)
1994–1998	ÍA	86	(0)
1999–2000	IFK Norrköping	13	(0)
2001	Valur	18	(0)
2002	KA	18	(0)
2003–2006	ÍA	37	(0)

International career
1996	Iceland	1	(0)

Managerial career
- 2009–2013: ÍA
- * Club domestic league appearances and goals

Þórður Þórðarson (born 10 April 1972) is an Icelandic former footballer who played as a goalkeeper. He was most recently the manager of Úrvalsdeild side ÍA, from 2009 to 2013. Þórður won one cap for the Iceland national football team in 1996, coming on as a substitute for Kristján Finnbogason in the 2–1 friendly win against Cyprus.

Þórður spent the majority of his playing career in Iceland with ÍA, KA and Valur, playing more than 150 league matches in total. During the 1999 and 2000 seasons he played in Sweden with IFK Norrköping, where he made 13 appearances.
