= 1959 Úrvalsdeild =

Úrvalsdeild
- Season: 1959

Statistics of Úrvalsdeild in the 1959 season.

== Overview ==
1959 was the 48th league championships in Iceland, six teams played and for the first time teams met both home and away. KR won the championship. KR's Þórólfur Beck was the top scorer with 11 goals.

== Final league table ==
Pos	Team	Pld	W	D	L	GF	GA	GD	Pts
1	KR (C)	10	10	0	0	41	6	+35	20
2	ÍA	10	5	1	4	30	19	+11	11
3	Valur	10	5	1	4	18	25	−7	11
4	Fram	10	4	3	3	19	18	+1	11
5	Keflavík	10	2	1	7	18	30	−12	5
6	Þróttur (R)	10	0	2	8	9	37	−28	2

Source: rsssf.com
Rules for classification: 1) points; 2) goal difference; 3) number of goals scored.
(C) Champions; (R) Relegated

== Results ==
Each team played every opponent once home and away for a total of 10 matches.

Home \ Away	FRA	ÍA	ÍBK	KR	VAL	ÞRÓ
Fram		3–2	3–1	0–1	0–0	2–2
ÍA	2–2		9–0	0–2	3–1	2–1
Keflavík	0–3	2–3		0–3	3–2	8–1
KR	7–0	4–2	3–2		7–1	5–0
Valur	2–1	4–2	2–1	0–6		3–2
Þróttur	1–5	0–5	1–1	1–3	0–3	

Legend: Blue = home team win; Yellow = draw; Red = away team win.
