= Guðjón Finnbogason =

Icelandic footballer

Personal information
- Date of birth: 2 December 1927
- Date of death: 26 February 2017 (aged 89)
- Position: Midfielder

International career
Years	Team	Apps	(Gls)
1953–1958	Iceland	16	(0)

Guðjón Finnbogason (2 December 1927 – 26 February 2017) was an Icelandic footballer. He played in 16 matches for the Iceland national football team from 1953 to 1958.
