= Gunnar Felixson =

Icelandic footballer

Personal information
- Date of birth: 14 March 1940
- Place of birth: Reykjavík, Kingdom of Iceland
- Position: Midfielder

Senior career*
| Years | Team | Apps | (Gls) |
| 1959–1970 | Knattspyrnufélag Reykjavíkur | | |

International career
| 1961–1966 | Iceland | 7 | (2) |
- * Club domestic league appearances and goals

Gunnar Felixson (born 14 March 1940) is an Icelandic former footballer who played as a midfielder. He was part of the Iceland national football team between 1961 and 1966. He played seven matches, scoring two goals. On club level he played for Knattspyrnufélag Reykjavíkur from 1959 to 1970, winning four national championships and six Cup titles. He participated in KR's first European matches and scored a goal against Liverpool F.C. at the 1964–65 European Cup.

Gunnar's brothers, Hörður Felixson and Bjarni Felixson, both played with him on KR and the Icelandic national team. In 1963, all three brothers played together for Iceland in two games against England.

== See also ==
- List of Iceland international footballers
