= 1961 Úrvalsdeild =

Úrvalsdeild
- Season: 1961

Statistics of the 1961 season of Úrvalsdeild, the top level men's football league in Iceland.

== Overview ==
It was contested by 6 teams, and KR won the championship. KR's Þórólfur Beck was the top scorer with 16 goals.

== Final league table ==
Pos	Team	Pld	W	D	L	GF	GA	GD	Pts
1	KR (C)	10	8	1	1	35	11	+24	17
2	ÍA	10	7	1	2	18	12	+6	15
3	Valur	10	5	2	3	18	13	+5	12
4	ÍBA	10	4	1	5	23	23	0	9
5	Fram	10	2	2	6	11	17	−6	6
6	ÍBH (R)	10	0	1	9	6	35	−29	1

Source: rsssf.com
Rules for classification: 1) points; 2) goal difference; 3) number of goals scored.
(C) Champions; (R) Relegated

== Results ==
Each team played every opponent once home and away for a total of 10 matches.

Home \ Away	FRA	ÍA	ÍBA	ÍBH	KR	VAL
Fram		1–2	1–6	3–0	0–2	1–1
ÍA	2–0		4–1	1–1	3–1	1–0
ÍBA	2–1	0–1		6–1	0–5	0–1
ÍBH	1–4	0–2	1–3		1–2	0–2
KR	0–0	4–0	6–3	7–0		5–2
Valur	1–0	3–1	2–2	4–0	2–3	

Legend: Blue = home team win; Yellow = draw; Red = away team win.
