= Þór Beck =

Icelandic footballer

Personal information
- Full name: Þórólfur Beck
- Date of birth: 21 January 1940
- Place of birth: Reykjavík, Iceland
- Date of death: 18 December 1999 (aged 59)
- Place of death: Reykjavík, Iceland
- Position: Striker

Senior career*
Years	Team	Apps	(Gls)
1958–1961	KR	90	(87)
1961–1965	St Mirren	80	(25)
1965–1966	Rangers	11	(2)
1966–1967	Rouen	7	(1)
1967	St. Louis Stars	11	(2)
Total		199	(117)

International career
1959–1969	Iceland	20	(5)

Managerial career
- 1970: IBV
- * Club domestic league appearances and goals

Þórólfur "Þór" Beck (21 January 1940 – 18 December 1999), also known as Thor Beck and Tottie Beck, was an Icelandic professional footballer who played as a striker.

== Biography ==
Þórólfur was born in Reykjavík, the capital city of Iceland, on 21 January 1940, the son of Eiríkur Þórólfsson Beck (1918–1951) and Rósbjörg Hulda Magnúsdóttir (1919–1981). He had one sister, Guðrún Eiríksdóttir Beck, born in 1941. After his football career ended, Þór returned to live in Reykjavík and died in his home in the city on 18 December 1999, at the age of 59.

== Career ==
Þór began his career in his native Iceland with KR, making his senior debut in 1958. He then played in Scotland with St Mirren and Rangers, before moving to France to play with FC Rouen. Þór later played in the National Professional Soccer League in the United States for the St. Louis Stars during the 1967 season.

After retiring as a player, Þór later coached IBV in his native Iceland.
