= 1968 Úrvalsdeild =

Úrvalsdeild
- Season: 1968

Statistics of Úrvalsdeild in the 1968 season.

== Overview ==
It was contested by 6 teams, and KR won the championship. Fram's Helgi Númason, ÍBA's Kári Árnason, KR's Ólafur Lárusson and Valur's Reynir Jónsson were the joint top scorers with 8 goals.

== Final league table ==
Pos	Team	Pld	W	D	L	GF	GA	GD	Pts	Qualification or relegation
1	KR (C)	10	6	3	1	27	16	+11	15	Qualification for the European Cup first round
2	Fram	10	4	4	2	17	15	+2	12	
3	ÍBA	10	3	4	3	17	14	+3	10	Qualification for the Inter-Cities Fairs Cup first round
4	Valur	10	3	4	3	18	15	+3	10	
5	ÍBV	10	4	1	5	16	21	−5	9	Qualification for the Cup Winners' Cup first round
6	Keflavík (O)	10	0	4	6	5	19	−14	4	Qualification for the relegation play-offs

Source: RSSSF
Rules for classification: 1) points; 2) goal difference; 3) number of goals scored.
(C) Champions; (O) Play-off winners

== Results ==
Each team played every opponent once home and away for a total of 10 matches.

Home \ Away	FRA	ÍBA	ÍBV	ÍBK	KR	VAL
Fram		1–1	0–0	2–1	2–2	2–0
ÍBA	1–2		3–0	1–1	2–3	2–2
ÍBV	2–4	4–2		2–0	0–3	3–1
Keflavík	1–1	0–1	0–1		2–2	0–3
KR	3–1	0–3	4–3	6–0		2–1
Valur	4–2	1–1	4–1	0–0	2–2	

Source: RSSSF
Legend: Blue = home team win; Yellow = draw; Red = away team win.
