= John Steen Olsen =

Danish footballer (born 1943)

Personal information
- Date of birth: 4 January 1943 (age 83)
- Place of birth: Copenhagen, Denmark
- Position: Forward

Senior career*
Years	Team	Apps	(Gls)
1961–1968	Hvidovre IF	204	(48)
1968	Boston Beacons	?	(?)
1969–1970	DOS	17	(3)
1969–1974	Utrecht	126	(21)
1974–1975	Feyenoord	15	(3)
1976	Utrecht	15	(5)
1976–1977	IFK Malmö	?	(?)
1977–1978	Hvidovre IF	?	(?)

International career
1966–1973	Denmark	17	(3)
- * Club domestic league appearances and goals

John Steen Olsen (born 4 January 1943) is a Danish former footballer. He played for Hvidovre IF, Boston Beacons, VV DOS, FC Utrecht, Feyenoord and IFK Malmö during his active career.

After his career, he worked as a scout for Ajax in Scandinavia, bringing players such as Zlatan Ibrahimović, Viktor Fischer, Christian Eriksen, Michael Laudrup and Kasper Dolberg to Amsterdam.
