= Kári Árnason (footballer, born 1944) =

Icelandic footballer

Personal information
- Date of birth: 25 February 1944
- Date of death: 2 July 2024 (aged 80)
- Position: Right midfielder

Senior career*
Years	Team	Apps	(Gls)
1960–1975	ÍBA		

International career^{‡}
1961–1971	Iceland	11	(1)
- * Club domestic league appearances and goals as of 30 september 2017 ‡ National team caps and goals as of 30 September 2017

Kári Þorgeir Árnason (1944-2024) was an Icelandic international footballer who played for ÍB Akureyri (ÍBA). Kári played two qualification matches for the Olympics against the amateur national team of Spain in 1967. In the first game, which was played in Iceland, he came on as a substitute in the 40th minute. In the second game, which was played in Spain, he was among the starting 11 as a right midfielder. At half-time, the score was 2–1 in favor of Spain. In the second half, Eyleifur Hafsteinsson scored an equalizer and Kári put Iceland ahead with another goal. However, Iceland then conceded three goals, making the final score 5–3 in favor of Spain.

Kári joined the senior team of ÍBA in 1960. In the 1968 Úrvalsdeild he was one of four joint top scorers. The same year, he was chosen as Akureyri's footballer of the year. He retired in 1975 from Knattspyrnufélag Akureyrar (KA) when ÍBA reverted to the two separate clubs KA and Þór Akureyri. In 1976 he played in the annual game between KA and Víkingur in memory of ÍBA player Jakob Jakobsson, and was hired later that year as assistant manager of the KA senior squad.
