= Football Association of Iceland =

Governing body of association football in Iceland

UEFA
- Founded: 26 March 1947; 79 years ago
- FIFA affiliation: 1947
- UEFA affiliation: 15 June 1954; 72 years ago
- President: Þorvaldur Örlygsson
- Website: https://www.ksi.is/

The Football Association of Iceland (Icelandic: Knattspyrnusamband Íslands, pronounced [ˈkʰnahtˌspɪ(r)tnʏˌsampant ˈistlan(t)s]; KSÍ) is the governing body of football in Iceland. It was founded on 26 March 1947, joined FIFA the same year, and UEFA in 1954. It organises the football league, Úrvalsdeild, and the Iceland men's national football team and Iceland women's national football team. It is based in Reykjavík.

== Presidents ==
- Agnar K. Jónsson (1947–1948)
- Jón Sigurðsson (1948–1952)
- Sigurjón Jónsson (1952–1954)
- Björgvin Schram (1954–1968)
- Albert Guðmundsson (1968–1973)
- Ellert B. Schram (1973–1989)
- Eggert Magnússon (1989–2007)
- Geir Þorsteinsson (2007–2017)
- Guðni Bergsson (2017–2021)
- Vanda Sigurgeirsdóttir (2021–2024)
- Þorvaldur Örlygsson (2024–present)

== National teams ==
- Iceland men's national under-17 football team
- Iceland men's national under-19 football team
- Iceland men's national under-21 football team
- Iceland men's national football team
- Iceland women's national football team
- Iceland national futsal team

== 2021 scandals ==
In 2021, The Football Association of Iceland was shaken by serious scandals. On 13 August, an article titled "On KSÍ and Misogyny" appeared on the Icelandic newsweb Vísir.is, written by activist Hanna Björg Vilhjálmsdóttir, stating that representatives of the Association had actively suppressed news of a gang rape where the perpetrators had been two well-known Icelandic professional footballers. Four days later, a declaration from KSÍ appeared in the media, claiming that the Association had never attempted to silence or suppress cases of violence and assaults. Vilhjálmsdóttir's article was repudiated as "insinuations" ("dylgjur"). On 26 August, Guðni Bergsson, president of KSÍ was interviewed on RÚV, Iceland's national TV, and claimed that the Association totally disapproved of any kind of violence, sexual or other. Additionally, Guðni stated that The Football Association had never received any formal notifications of violence by professional footballers. The following day, Guðni was contradicted by Þórhildur Gyða Arnarsdóttir, an Icelandic woman in her mid-twenties, who had been sexually assaulted by a member of the Icelandic Football Team in 2017. Þórhildur reported the crime to the police, but no action was taken. Six months later, Þórhildur's father realised that his daughter's aggressor had been recruited on the national team for an upcoming match. He consequently reported the incident to the Football Association and received the reply that action would be taken. However, the aggressor remained on the team and KSÍ took no action. Þórhildur additionally claimed that she had been contacted by a lawyer, sent by KSÍ, who offered her a compensation and asked her to sign a confidentiality agreement of the incident. Following the interview with Þórhildur, Guðni Bergsson resigned as president of KSÍ.

Following Guðni's resignation, two players were removed from the national team: Kolbeinn Sigþórsson and Rúnar Már Sigurjónsson. Kolbeinn was subsequently exposed as the perpetrator of the assault on Þórhildur.

The board of KSÍ intended to continue undisturbed after Guðni's renouncement, claiming that the Association would be unfunctional without them. However, a majority of KSÍ's member societies protested and demanded that the board and the manager resign. A number of KSÍ's major sponsors added to the threat by stating that they would rescind their contracts with the Association unless its leaders seriously improved how reports of sexual abuse were treated. Within two days of Bergsson's resignation, the entire board of KSÍ, consisting of 14 men and 2 women, had resigned as well.
