= 1963 Úrvalsdeild =

Úrvalsdeild
- Season: 1963

Statistics of Úrvalsdeild in the 1963 season.

== Overview ==
It was contested by 6 teams, and KR won the championship. ÍA's Skúli Hákonarsson was the top scorer with 9 goals.

== Final league table ==
Pos	Team	Pld	W	D	L	GF	GA	GD	Pts	Qualification or relegation
1	KR (C)	10	7	1	2	27	16	+11	15	Qualification for the European Cup preliminary round
2	ÍA	10	6	1	3	25	17	+8	13	
3	Valur	10	4	2	4	20	20	0	10	
4	Fram	10	4	1	5	11	20	−9	9	
5	Keflavík	10	3	1	6	15	19	−4	7	
6	ÍBA (R)	10	2	2	6	16	22	−6	6	Relegation to 1. deild karla

Source: rsssf.com
Rules for classification: 1) points; 2) goal difference; 3) number of goals scored.
(C) Champions; (R) Relegated

== Results ==
Each team played every opponent once home and away for a total of 10 matches.

Home \ Away	FRA	ÍA	ÍBA	ÍBK	KR	VAL
Fram		2–2	1–0	1–0	2–5	1–0
ÍA	5–2		3–1	4–2	2–1	1–2
ÍBA	1–2	1–3		0–2	1–2	2–1
Keflavík	2–0	2–1	2–4		1–2	1–1
KR	2–0	3–1	2–2	3–2		7–2
Valur	3–0	1–3	4–4	3–1	3–0	

Legend: Blue = home team win; Yellow = draw; Red = away team win.
