= Boston Beacons =

Defunct American soccer club

- Full name: Boston Beacons
- Nickname: Beacons
- Founded: 1968
- Dissolved: 1968; 58 years ago
- Stadium: Fenway Park
- Capacity: 33,375
- League: NASL
- 1968: 5th, Atlantic Division
Home colors	Away colors

The Boston Beacons were an American soccer professional team that competed in the North American Soccer League (NASL) in 1968. The team was based in Boston and played their home games at Fenway Park. Originally intended to be a charter member of the National Professional Soccer League (NPSL) in 1967, the team played its first and only season in the 1968 NASL following the merger of the NPSL and rival United Soccer Association.

== History ==
In 1966, several groups of entrepreneurs were exploring the idea of forming a professional soccer league in United States and Canada. Two of these groups merged to form the National Professional Soccer League (NPSL) and franchise rights were awarded to ten ownership groups. Boston was originally chosen as a team location, but withdrew from the 1967 season as the organization was unable to find a suitable stadium. (Note: The NPSL selected San Francisco to take Boston's place, the team became the Oakland Clippers) The NPSL announced that Boston would join the league in 1968 with a team owned by retired Boston Celtics coach Red Auerbach and Boston Red Sox executive vice president Dick O'Connell. In April 1967, General Manager Joe McKenney announced that the team name of Beacons had been chosen based on fan suggestions and that the team would start play in 1968 at Fenway Park. In June 1967, Jack Mansell was hired as head coach, resigning from Rotherham United to take the position. In preparation to join the league, the organization hosted an exhibition match between the Baltimore Bays and the Chicago Spurs in July 1967.

Following the merger of the NPSL and the United Soccer Association, it was announced that the city of Boston would be represented by one of the 20 teams in the North American Soccer League (NASL) (Note: 17 teams contested the 1968 NASL season with three teams folding before the season began); the Boston Shamrock Rovers of the former USA folded, leaving the New England region to Beacons.

The Beacons opened their season on the road against the Oakland Clippers with a 2–1 loss in front of 5,714 fans, losing due to a botched clearance that bounced off a Beacon player and into the net for the Clipper's winning goal. On July 8, 1968, the Beacons lost by a score of 7–1 to Brazilian team Santos FC, who were touring the United States and playing a series of exhibition matches against NASL and international teams. Santos star Pelé scored a goal and created an assist in the game played before a crowd of 18,431, the largest to attend a Beacons match at Fenway Park. The team finished the season in last place in the Atlantic Division with a record of 9 wins, 17 losses and 6 draws, and an average attendance of 4,004.

During a meeting of NASL officials on October 24, 1968, GM Joe McKenney stated that the team would "100 per cent chance" quit the league. The team officially folded shortly after.

== Media Coverage ==
WCOP radio, which covered some Boston Shamrock Rovers matches the year before, carried 24 of the 32 matches. WSBK-TV covered 7 matches, plus CBS coverage of an away match in August versus Baltimore Bays. WHDH-TV (channel 5), the then-CBS affiliate, was carrying Boston Red Sox games at the time and WSBK picked up all the nationally televised matches.

== Year-by-year ==
Year	League	W	L	T	Pts	Regular season	Playoffs	Avg. attendance
1968	NASL	9	17	6	121	5th, Atlantic Division	Did not qualify	4,004

== See also ==
- Boston Rovers
- Boston Minutemen
- New England Tea Men
