= Ríkharður Jónsson =

Icelandic footballer (1929–2017)

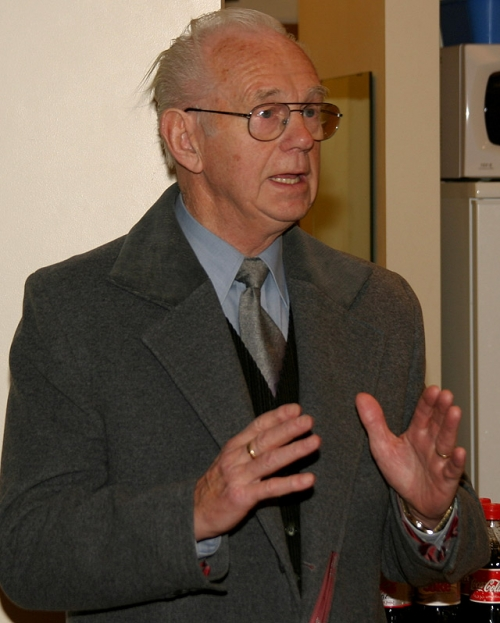
- Ríkharður in 2010

Personal information
- Date of birth: 12 November 1929
- Place of birth: Akranes, Iceland
- Date of death: 14 February 2017 (aged 87)
- Position: Forward

Senior career*
Years	Team	Apps	(Gls)
1947–1950	Fram	22	(15)
1951–1969	ÍA Akranes	185	(139)
Total		207	(154)

International career
1947–1965	Iceland	33	(17)

Managerial career
- 1951–1960: ÍA Akranes
- 1962: Iceland
- 1962–1964: ÍA Akranes
- 1966: ÍA Akranes
- 1967: Keflavík
- 1969–1970: ÍA Akranes
- 1969–1971: Iceland
- 1972–1973: ÍA Akranes
- * Club domestic league appearances and goals

Ríkharður Jónsson (12 November 1929 – 14 February 2017) was an Icelandic football player and manager.

A forward, he made his debut for the Iceland national team in 1947, and got 33 caps and 17 goals until 1965. This made him top goalscorer of the national team. In 2006 the record was equalled by Eiður Guðjohnsen. In 2007, it was broken. After his playing career he also became coach of the national football team from 1969 to 1971. He also managed ÍA Akranes.

He played for Fram and ÍA Akranes.

Ríkharður died on 14 February 2017, aged 87.

== Honours ==
Individual

- Icelandic League top goalscorer: 1955
