= Knattspyrnufélag Reykjavíkur =

Football club based in Reykjavík, Iceland

KR
- Full name: Knattspyrnufélag Reykjavíkur
- Nickname: KR-ingar
- Short name: KR
- Founded: 16 February 1899; 127 years ago
- Ground: KR-völlur, Reykjavík, Iceland
- Capacity: 2,781 (1,541 seated)
- Chairman: Magnús Orri Schram
- Manager: Óskar Hrafn Þorvaldsson
- League: Besta deild karla
- 2026: Besta deild karla, 2nd of 12
- Website: www.kr.is
Home colours	Away colours

Knattspyrnufélag Reykjavíkur (Icelandic pronunciation: [ˈkʰnahtˌspɪ(r)tnʏˌfjɛːˌlaːɣ ˈreiːcaˌviːkʏr̥], lit. 'Reykjavík Football Club'), commonly abbreviated to KR, is an Icelandic football club based in the Vesturbær district of the capital, Reykjavík.

KR is the oldest and most successful club in Icelandic football, having won the Besta deild karla championship 27 times, including the first season in 1912. It is also the most successful club in the Icelandic men's Cup, with 14 titles including the first in 1960 and most recent in 2014. In 1964, KR was also the first Icelandic representative in the European Cup.

== History ==
=== Early history ===
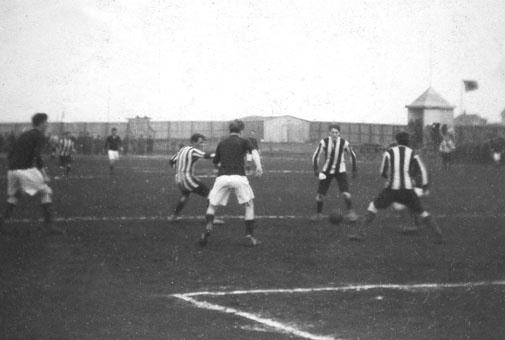
KR playing Fram in the inaugural Icelandic football season in 1912.

KR owe their founding to a Scottish printer, James Ferguson who arrived in Reykjavík in 1895 to work in a large printing house. He soon began to teach the local youngsters the game of football and was so successful that during the next few years the game of association football spread throughout Iceland. In 1899 some of his former pupils formed the Reykjavík Football Club.

KR was established on 16 February 1899, making it the oldest football club in Iceland. It was founded as Fótboltafélag Reykjavíkur (Reykjavík Football Club), before changing to Knattspyrnufélag Reykjavíkur, also meaning Reykjavík Football Club, the change due to "knattspyrna" being considered a more elegant word ("Fótbolti" is literally translated as "football" while "knattspyrna", while translating as "football", is literally "ballkicking"). KR was the only football club in Reykjavík for a decade, but as soon as other clubs were established there were plans for competitions. KR won the inaugural championship in 1912 after a play-off with Fram.

=== 1955–1998 ===
KR won the first title after the Icelandic league was divided into two divisions in 1955, and won again in 1959 when the 1st Division was played on a home-and-away basis for the first time. KR also won the first Icelandic Cup competition in 1960. KR was the first Icelandic club to play in European competition, entering the 1964–65 European Cup. They lost the preliminary round 11–1 on aggregate to Liverpool, who were also playing their first European tie. KR's women's team was also the first Icelandic contender in Europe, entering the inaugural European Competition in 2001.

KR won their 20th title in 1968. They were relegated for the first time to the Second Division in 1977, but narrowly missed winning the first division in 1990, 1996 and 1998, when KR lost out in the title race on the final day; all of which strengthened the solidarity within the club.

=== Recent history ===
In KR's centenary year in 1999 the team ended its long quest for another national title. The team had not won the league title for 31 years despite often being viewed as favourites but they looked favourites all season this time. They clinched the title with a 4–0 win over Víkingur in the penultimate round and then beat ÍA 3–1 in the cup final in front of a capacity crowd at the national stadium. The women's team was equally successful, winning the league and the cup, and KR celebrated its centenary year with an unprecedented double-double.

In total, the men's team has won the league title 26 times and the cup 14 times and during the last decade the women's team has won six league titles and twice won the cup. The men's team has four times won the double, in 1961, 1963, 1999 and in 2011.

KR's best European success was in 2009–10 UEFA Europa League when they defeated AEL (2–0, 1–1) in the second qualifying round, but were eliminated in next round by Basel (2–2, 1–3). In 2011–12 UEFA Europa League, KR eliminated ÍF Fuglafjørður in the first qualifying round and achieved a big win against MŠK Žilina in the next round (3–0) in Reykjavík and though losing 2–0 in Zilina advanced through to the next round where they lost to Dinamo Tbilisi (1–6 on aggregate).

== Jersey ==
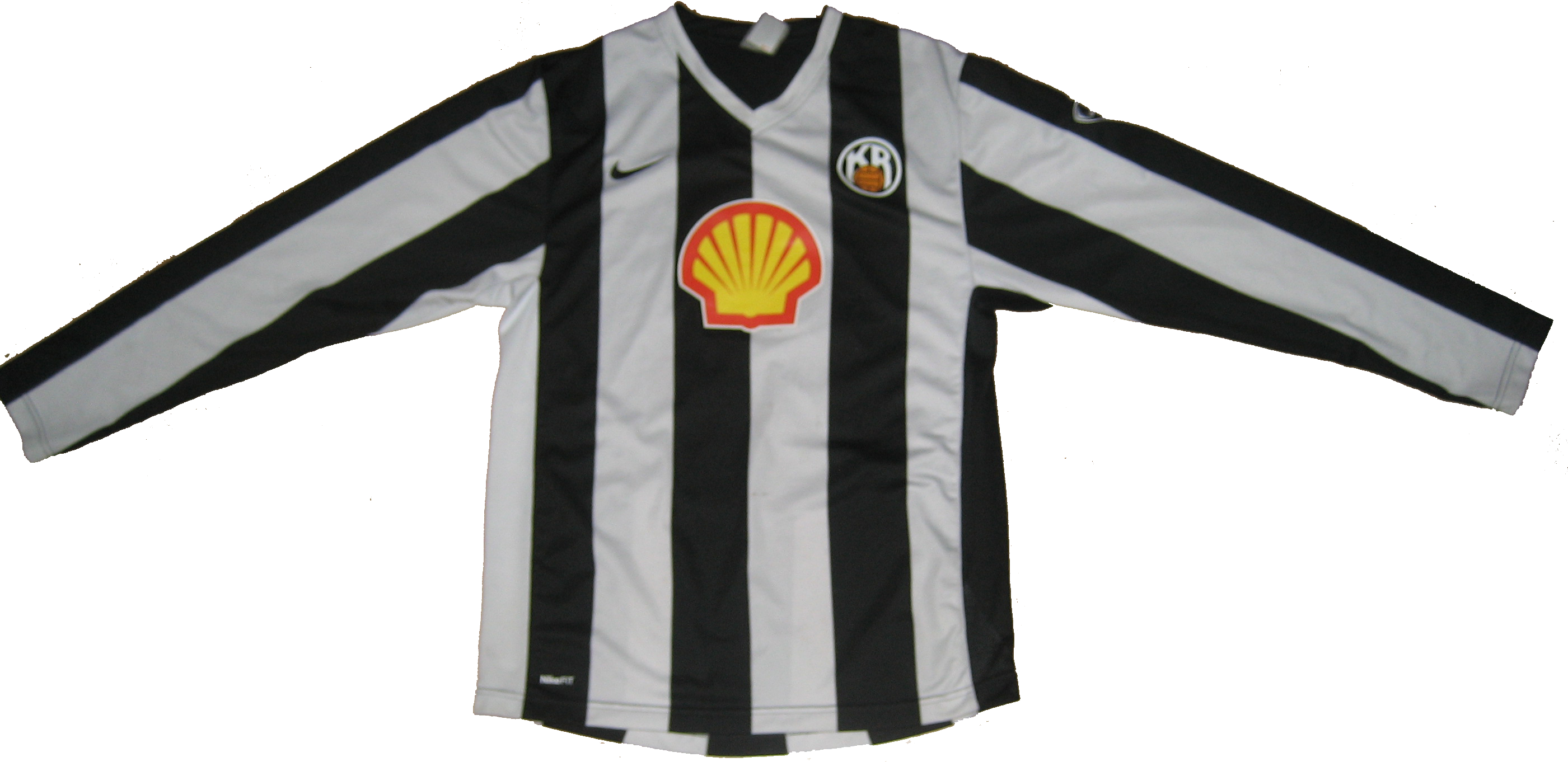
KR's home shirt from 2007 to 2009, manufactured by Nike and sponsored by Shell Oil.

KR play in black and white stripes. This is in tribute to the English club Newcastle United who were the current English champions when KR were formed. The current sponsor of KR is the Icelandic medical company Alvogen. Above the club badge on the shirt, although not featured on replica shirts, there are five stars, each representing 5 of KR's 25 league titles. On 20 October 2006, KR introduced a new deal with sport equipment manufacturer Nike and the team will wear products from Nike for the 2007 season.

The KR shorts are black and white and only carry the logo of Eimskip, Nike the KR badge and the squad number of the player. The KR socks are black and white and are without a club badge.

== Other sports ==
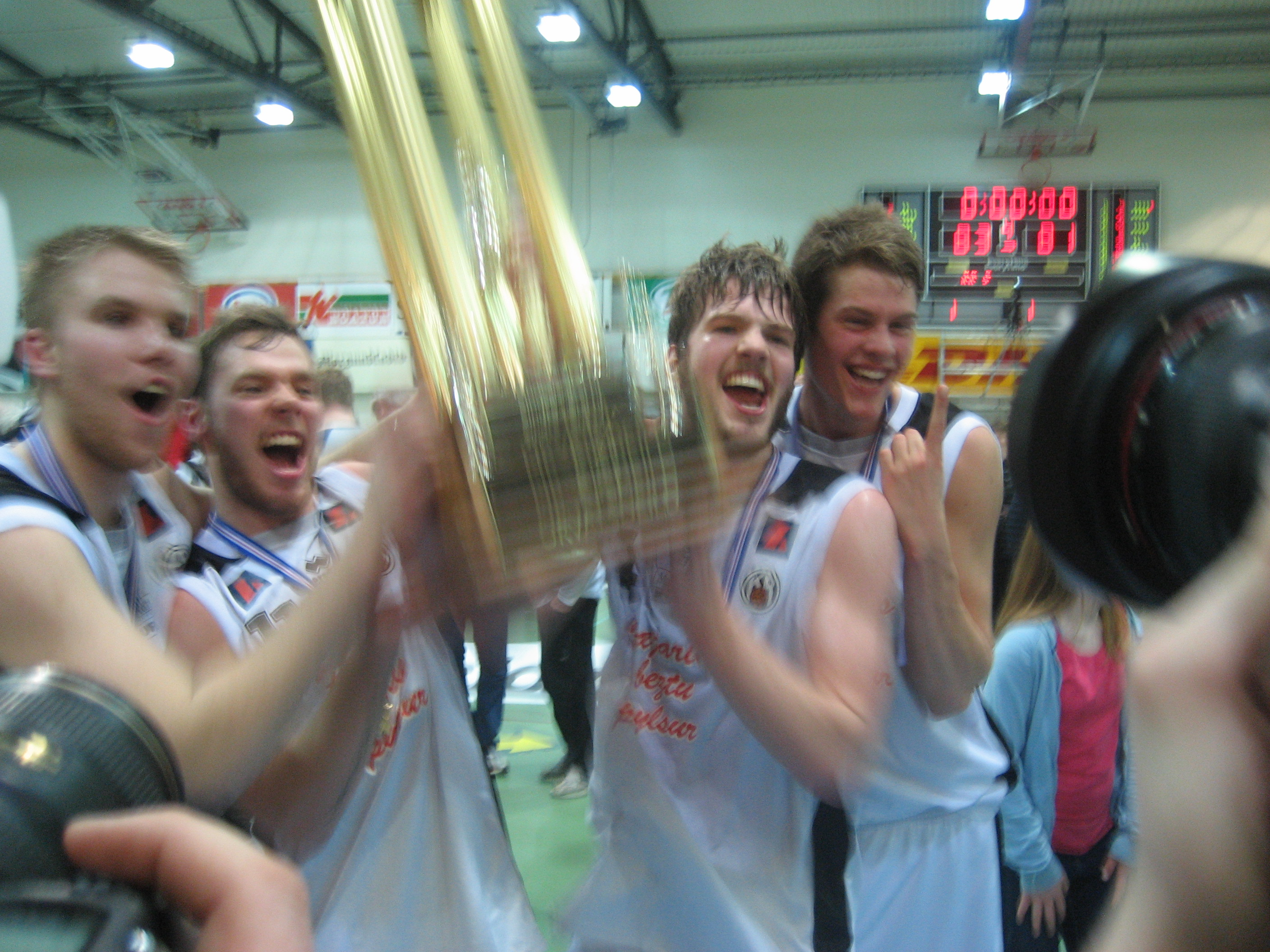
KR won the Icelandic basketball league the 2006–2007 season, their 10th overall title.

Besides football, which is the original sport for which the club was founded, KR today also practices basketball, badminton, table tennis, bowling, darts, team handball, skiing, Icelandic wrestling and swimming.

== Grounds ==
KR have been playing at their own ground, KR-völlur (KR Field) in the west end of Reykjavík, since 1984, having previously played at the national stadium (Laugardalsvöllur) and at the old municipal stadium (Melavöllur). KR has had the highest attendances for the last nine years. Only 376 attended the first match at KR-völlur in 1984 but in the centenary year an average crowd of 2,501 saw KR's home matches: about 0.75% of the Icelandic population.

== Players ==
=== Current squad ===
As of 15 August 2026

Note: Flags indicate national team as defined under FIFA eligibility rules; some limited exceptions apply. Players may hold more than one non-FIFA nationality.

No.	Pos.	Nation	Player
1	GK	ISL	Sigurpáll Sören Ingólfsson
4	DF	GER	Michael Akoto
7	DF	ISL	Finnur Tómas Pálmason
8	FW	ISL	Stefán Árni Geirsson
9	FW	ISL	Eiður Gauti Sæbjörnsson
11	FW	ISL	Aron Sigurðarson (captain)
12	GK	ISL	Halldór Snær Georgsson
14	FW	ISL	Jason Daði Svanþórsson
17	FW	ENG	Luke Rae
21	DF	ISL	Gabríel Hrannar Eyjólfsson

No.	Pos.	Nation	Player
22	DF	ISL	Ástbjörn Þórðarson
23	MF	ISL	Arnór Ingvi Traustason
26	MF	ISL	Hrafn Tómasson
28	DF	ISL	Hjalti Sigurðsson
29	MF	ISL	Aron Þórður Albertsson
30	MF	ISL	Sigurður Kárason
31	GK	ISL	Árnar Freyr Ólafsson
45	FW	ISL	Ásgeir Galdur Guðmundsson
77	MF	ISL	Orri Hrafn Kjartansson
95	DF	ISL	Sölvi Snær Ásgeirsson

=== Out on loan ===
Note: Flags indicate national team as defined under FIFA eligibility rules; some limited exceptions apply. Players may hold more than one non-FIFA nationality.

No.	Pos.	Nation	Player
5	DF	ISL	Birgir Steinn Styrmisson (at HK until 5 February 2027)
6	MF	ISL	Alexander Helgi Sigurðarson (at Njarðvík until 5 February 2027)
15	DF	ISL	Gyrðir Hrafn Guðbrandsson (at Þór Akureyri until 5 February 2027)

No.	Pos.	Nation	Player
90	GK	ISL	Haukur Logi Tryggvason (at Ægir until 5 February 2027)
—	MF	ISL	Róbert Elís Hlynsson (at ÍBV until 5 February 2027)
—	FW	GHA	Fuseini Issah (at KV until 5 February 2027)

== European cups history ==
As of 13 July 2017

=== Overall ===
Competition	Matches	W	D	L	GF	GA
European Cup / UEFA Champions League	21	3	4	14	20	66
UEFA Cup / UEFA Europa League	47	13	11	23	59	81
UEFA Europa Conference League	2	1	0	1	2	4
UEFA Cup Winners' Cup	14	2	2	10	14	37
TOTAL	84	19	17	48	95	188

=== Matches ===
Season	Cup	Round	Nation	Club	Result	Aggregate
1964–65	European Cup	Q	(England)	Liverpool	0–5, 1–6	1–11
1965–66	European Cup Winners' Cup	1R	(Norway)	Rosenborg	1–3, 1–3	2–6
1966–67	European Cup	1R	(France)	Nantes	2–3, 2–5	4–8
1967–68	European Cup Winners' Cup	1R	(Scotland)	Aberdeen	0–10, 1–4	1–14
1968–69	European Cup Winners' Cup	1R	(Greece)	Olympiacos	0–2, 0–2	0–4
1969–70	European Cup	1R	(Netherlands)	Feyenoord	2–12, 0–4	2–16
1984–85	UEFA Cup	1R	(England)	Queens Park Rangers	0–3, 0–4	0–7
1991–92	UEFA Cup	1R	(Italy)	Torino	0–2, 1–6	1–8
1993–94	UEFA Cup	1R	(Hungary)	MTK Budapest	1–2, 0–0	1–2
1995–96	European Cup Winners' Cup	Q	(Luxembourg)	CS Grevenmacher	2–3, 2–0	4–3
1995–96	European Cup Winners' Cup	1R	(England)	Everton	2–3, 1–3	3–6
1996–97	European Cup Winners' Cup	Q	(Belarus)	MPKC Mozyr	2–2, 1–0	3–2
1996–97	European Cup Winners' Cup	1R	(Sweden)	AIK Stockholm	0–1, 1–1	1–2
1997–98	UEFA Cup	1Q	(Romania)	Dinamo Bucharest	2–0, 2–1	4–1
1997–98	UEFA Cup	2Q	(Greece)	OFI	0–0, 1–3	1–3
1999–00	UEFA Cup	Q	(Scotland)	Kilmarnock	1–0, 0–2	1–2
2000–01	UEFA Champions League	1Q	(Malta)	Birkirkara	2–1, 4–1	6–2
2000–01	UEFA Champions League	2Q	(Denmark)	Brøndby	1–3, 0–0	1–3
2001–02	UEFA Champions League	1Q	(Albania)	Vllaznia	2–1, 0–1	2–2
2003–04	UEFA Champions League	1Q	(Armenia)	Pyunik	0–1, 1–1	1–2
2004–05	UEFA Champions League	1Q	(Republic of Ireland)	Shelbourne	2–2, 0–0	2–2
2007–08	UEFA Cup	1Q	(Sweden)	BK Häcken	1–1, 0–1	1–2
2009–10	UEFA Europa League	2Q	(Greece)	AEL	2–0, 1–1	3–1
2009–10	UEFA Europa League	3Q	(Switzerland)	Basel	2–2, 1–3	3–5
2010–11	UEFA Europa League	1Q	(Northern Ireland)	Glentoran	3–0, 2–2	5–2
2010–11	UEFA Europa League	2Q	(Ukraine)	Karpaty Lviv	0–3, 2–3	2–6
2011–12	UEFA Europa League	1Q	(Faroe Islands)	ÍF	3–1, 5–1	8–2
2011–12	UEFA Europa League	2Q	(Slovakia)	MŠK Žilina	3–0, 0–2	3–2
2011–12	UEFA Europa League	3Q	(Georgia (country))	Dinamo Tbilisi	1–4, 0–2	1–6
2012–13	UEFA Champions League	2Q	(Finland)	HJK Helsinki	0–7, 1–2	1–9
2013–14	UEFA Europa League	1Q	(Northern Ireland)	Glentoran	0–0, 3–0	3–0
2013–14	UEFA Europa League	2Q	(Belgium)	Standard Liège	1–3, 1–3	2–6
2014–15	UEFA Champions League	2Q	(Scotland)	Celtic	0–1, 0–4	0–5
2015–16	UEFA Europa League	1Q	(Republic of Ireland)	Cork City	1–1, 2–1 (aet)	3–2
2015–16	UEFA Europa League	2Q	(Norway)	Rosenborg	0–1, 0–3	0–4
2016–17	UEFA Europa League	1Q	(Northern Ireland)	Glenavon	2–1, 6–0	8–1
2016–17	UEFA Europa League	2Q	(Switzerland)	Grasshopper	3–3, 1–2	4–5
2017–18	UEFA Europa League	1Q	(Finland)	SJK Seinäjoki	0–0, 2–0	2–0
2017–18	UEFA Europa League	2Q	(Israel)	Maccabi Tel Aviv	1–3, 0–2	1–5
2019–20	UEFA Europa League	1Q	(Norway)	Molde	1–7, 0–0	1–7
2020–21	UEFA Champions League	1Q	(Scotland)	Celtic	0–6	—N/a
2020–21	UEFA Europa League	2Q	(Estonia)	Flora	1–2	—N/a
2022–23	UEFA Europa Conference League	1Q	(Poland)	Pogoń Szczecin	1–4, 1–0	2–4
2027–28	UEFA Conference League	2Q				

== Club honours ==
- Icelandic Championships
  - Champions (27): 1912, 1919, 1926, 1927, 1928, 1929, 1931, 1932, 1934, 1941, 1948, 1949, 1950, 1952, 1955, 1959, 1961, 1963, 1965, 1968, 1999, 2000, 2002, 2003, 2011, 2013, 2019
  - Runners-up (24): 1916, 1917, 1920, 1923, 1930, 1933, 1935, 1936, 1937, 1943, 1944, 1945, 1954, 1956, 1958, 1960, 1983, 1990, 1992, 1995, 1996, 1998, 2006, 2009
- Icelandic Cup
  - Winners (14): 1960, 1961, 1962, 1963, 1964, 1966, 1967, 1994, 1995, 1999, 2008, 2011, 2012, 2014
- Icelandic League Cup
  - Winners (8): 1998, 2001, 2005, 2010, 2012, 2016, 2017, 2019
- Icelandic Super Cup
  - Winners (6): 1969, 1996, 2003, 2012, 2014, 2020

== Managers ==
- (Iceland) Óli B. Jónsson (1945), (1947–51), (1954–55), (1958– 31 December 1961), (1 January 1969–70)
- (Iceland) Ellert Schram 1973
- (England) Gordon Lee (1985–87)
- (Iceland) Guðjón Þórðarson (1 July 1994 – 30 June 1995)
- (Iceland) Atli Eðvaldsson (1 July 1998–99)
- (Iceland) Pétur Pétursson (2000–01)
- (Scotland) David Winnie 2001
- (Iceland) Willum Þór Þórsson 2002 – 2004
- (Iceland) Magnús Gylfason 2005
- (Iceland) Teitur Þórðarson (2006 – 11 December 2007)
- (Iceland) Logi Ólafsson (1 July 2007 – 20 July 2010)
- (Iceland) Rúnar Kristinsson (20 July 2010 – 10 October 2014)
- (Iceland) Bjarni Gudjonsson (15 October 2014 – 26 June 2016)
- (Iceland) Rúnar Kristinsson (2017– 7 October 2023 )
- (Iceland) Óskar Hrafn Þorvaldsson (14 August 2024 – )
