= Þórður Þórðarson (footballer, born 1930) =

Icelandic footballer

Personal information
- Full name: Þórður Þórðarson
- Date of birth: 26 November 1930
- Place of birth: Iceland
- Date of death: 30 November 2002 (aged 72)
- Position: Forward

Senior career*
Years	Team	Apps	(Gls)
1951–1960	ÍA	?	(?)

International career
1951–1958	Iceland	18	(11)
- * Club domestic league appearances and goals

Þórður Þórðarson (26 November 1930 – 30 November 2002) was an Icelandic footballer who played as a forward. He made his debut for the Iceland national football team on 29 June 1951 in the 4–3 win against Sweden and went on to earn 18 caps over a period of seven years, during which time he scored 11 goals for his country. Þórður spent his entire playing career with ÍA, spending nine seasons with the club from 1951 to 1960.

== International goals ==
Goal	Date	Opponent	Result
1.	29 June 1953	Austria (amateur)	3–4
2.	4 July 1954	Norway	1–0
3.	24 August 1954	Sweden	2–3
4.	25 August 1955	United States	3–2
5.	7 August 1956	England (amateur)	2–3
6.	5 June 1957	Belgium	3–8
7.	5 June 1957	Belgium	3–8
8.	10 July 1957	Denmark	2–6
9.	1 September 1957	France	1–5
10	4 September 1957	Belgium	2–5
11.	11 August 1958	Republic of Ireland	2–3
