= 1997 Icelandic Men's Football League Cup =

Deildarbikar karla

Tournament details
- Country: Iceland
- Teams: 34

Final positions
- Champions: ÍBV
- Runners-up: Valur

The 1997 Icelandic Men's Football League Cup was the second staging of the Icelandic League Cup. It featured 34 teams. The competition started on 13 March 1997 and concluded on 13 May 1997 with ÍBV beating Valur 3–2 in the final.

== Details ==
- The 34 teams were divided into 5 groups of 6 teams and 1 group of 4 teams, with the top two teams from each group qualifying for the second group stage. The second group stage consisted of 4 groups each of 3 teams. The teams played each other once with the top team in each group going through to the semi-finals.

== Group stage ==
=== Group A ===
Pos	Team	Pld	W	D	L	GF	GA	GD	Pts	Qualification
1	Fylkir (Q)	6	4	1	1	15	9	+6	13	Qualification to the Second round
2	Stjarnan (Q)	6	4	0	2	21	9	+12	12	Qualification to the Second round
3	Þróttur R.	6	3	1	2	16	11	+5	10	
4	Afturelding	6	0	0	6	2	25	−23	0	

Rules for classification: 1) points; 2) goal difference; 3) number of goals scored.
(Q) Qualified for the phase indicated

=== Group B ===
Pos	Team	Pld	W	D	L	GF	GA	GD	Pts	Qualification
1	KR (Q)	5	5	0	0	17	1	+16	15	Qualification to the Second round
2	FH (Q)	5	3	0	2	15	12	+3	9	Qualification to the Second round
3	Keflavík	5	2	2	1	13	9	+4	8	
4	Sindri	5	1	1	3	9	13	−4	4	
5	Þróttur N.	5	1	1	3	8	17	−9	4	
6	Njarðvík	5	1	0	4	6	16	−10	3	

Rules for classification: 1) points; 2) goal difference; 3) number of goals scored.
(Q) Qualified for the phase indicated

=== Group C ===
Pos	Team	Pld	W	D	L	GF	GA	GD	Pts	Qualification
1	ÍBV (Q)	5	4	1	0	23	2	+21	13	Qualification to the Second round
2	Breiðablik (Q)	5	4	1	0	18	7	+11	13	Qualification to the Second round
3	Víkingur Reykjavík	5	3	0	2	8	9	−1	9	
4	KS	5	1	0	4	7	16	−9	3	
5	Völsungur	5	1	0	4	6	15	−9	3	
6	Ægir	5	1	0	4	3	16	−13	3	

Rules for classification: 1) points; 2) goal difference; 3) number of goals scored.
(Q) Qualified for the phase indicated

=== Group D ===
Pos	Team	Pld	W	D	L	GF	GA	GD	Pts	Qualification
1	ÍA (Q)	5	5	0	0	20	7	+13	15	Qualification to the Second round
2	Grindavík (Q)	5	4	0	1	24	9	+15	12	Qualification to the Second round
3	Leiknir Reykjavík	5	3	0	2	20	8	+12	9	
4	HK	5	2	0	3	11	12	−1	6	
5	ÍR	5	1	0	4	10	12	−2	3	
6	Víkingur Ólafsvík	5	0	0	5	4	41	−37	0	

Rules for classification: 1) points; 2) goal difference; 3) number of goals scored.
(Q) Qualified for the phase indicated

=== Group E ===
Pos	Team	Pld	W	D	L	GF	GA	GD	Pts	Qualification
1	Fram (Q)	5	4	1	0	15	3	+12	13	Qualification to the Second round
2	Leiftur (Q)	5	4	0	1	23	4	+19	12	Qualification to the Second round
3	KA	5	3	0	2	7	6	+1	9	
4	Haukar	5	1	2	2	11	15	−4	5	
5	Selfoss	5	0	2	3	8	18	−10	2	
6	Reynir Sandgerði	5	0	1	4	2	20	−18	1	

Rules for classification: 1) points; 2) goal difference; 3) number of goals scored.
(Q) Qualified for the phase indicated

=== Group F ===
Pos	Team	Pld	W	D	L	GF	GA	GD	Pts	Qualification
1	Skallagrímur (Q)	5	5	0	0	15	5	+10	15	Qualification to the Second round
2	Valur (Q)	5	4	0	1	16	6	+10	12	Qualification to the Second round
3	Lettir	5	2	1	2	12	14	−2	7	
4	Þór Akureyri	5	1	2	2	9	10	−1	5	
5	Fjölnir	5	1	0	4	6	17	−11	3	
6	Dalvík	5	0	1	4	6	12	−6	1	

Rules for classification: 1) points; 2) goal difference; 3) number of goals scored.
(Q) Qualified for the phase indicated

== Second round ==
=== Group A ===
Pos	Team	Pld	W	D	L	GF	GA	GD	Pts	Qualification
1	Breiðablik (Q)	2	2	0	0	7	3	+4	6	Qualification to the Semi-finals
2	Fram	2	1	0	1	3	3	0	3	
3	Fylkir	2	0	0	2	1	5	−4	0	

Rules for classification: 1) points; 2) goal difference; 3) number of goals scored.
(Q) Qualified for the phase indicated

=== Group B ===
Pos	Team	Pld	W	D	L	GF	GA	GD	Pts	Qualification
1	Grindavík (Q)	2	2	0	0	5	2	+3	6	Qualification to the Semi-finals
2	Skallagrímur	2	1	0	1	3	4	−1	3	
3	KR	2	0	0	2	0	2	−2	0	

Rules for classification: 1) points; 2) goal difference; 3) number of goals scored.
(Q) Qualified for the phase indicated

=== Group C ===
Pos	Team	Pld	W	D	L	GF	GA	GD	Pts	Qualification
1	ÍBV (Q)	2	2	0	0	6	2	+4	6	Qualification to the Semi-finals
2	Leiftur	2	1	0	1	3	3	0	3	
3	Stjarnan	2	0	0	2	1	5	−4	0	

Rules for classification: 1) points; 2) goal difference; 3) number of goals scored.
(Q) Qualified for the phase indicated

=== Group D ===
Pos	Team	Pld	W	D	L	GF	GA	GD	Pts	Qualification
1	Valur (Q)	2	1	1	0	4	0	+4	4	Qualification to the Semi-finals
2	FH	2	0	2	0	0	0	0	2	
3	ÍA	2	0	1	1	0	4	−4	1	

Rules for classification: 1) points; 2) goal difference; 3) number of goals scored.
(Q) Qualified for the phase indicated

== Semi-finals ==
8 May 1997

Grindavík	0–3	ÍBV
		Arnason; Snorrason; Gudmundsson

8 May 1997

Breiðablik	3–4	Valur
Petursson; Hinriksson; Einarsson		Hreidarsson, Johannsson,

== Final ==
13 May 1997

ÍBV	3–2 (a.e.t.)	Valur
Gudmundsson; Larusson; Sigurdsson		Porca; Johannsson

Laugardalsvöllur, Reykjavík
Referee: Eyjolfur Olafsson

== See also ==
- Icelandic Men's Football Cup
- Knattspyrnusamband Íslands - The Icelandic Football Association
- Icelandic First Division League 1997
