= 1996 Icelandic Men's Football League Cup =

Deildarbikar karla

Tournament details
- Country: Iceland
- Teams: 34

Final positions
- Champions: ÍA
- Runners-up: Breiðablik

The 1996 Icelandic Men's Football League Cup was the first staging of the Iceland League Cup. It featured 34 teams. The competition started on 14 March 1996 and concluded on 15 May 1996 with ÍA beating Breiðablik 3–1 in the final.

== Details ==
- The 34 teams were divided into 5 groups of 6 teams and 1 group of 4 teams, with the top two teams from each group qualifying for the quarter-finals. The semi finals then consisted of 2 groups each of 3 teams. The teams played each other once with the top team in each group going through to the final.

== Group stage ==
=== Group A ===
Pos	Team	Pld	W	D	L	GF	GA	GD	Pts	Qualification
1	ÍA (Q)	5	4	1	0	25	5	+20	13	Qualification to the Quarter-finals
2	Stjarnan (Q)	5	4	1	0	25	7	+18	13	Qualification to the Quarter-finals
3	Skallagrímur	5	3	0	2	10	4	+6	9	
4	Ægir	5	1	0	4	9	16	−7	3	
5	Selfoss	5	1	0	4	6	21	−15	3	
6	BI	5	1	0	4	3	25	−22	3	

Rules for classification: 1) points; 2) goal difference; 3) number of goals scored.
(Q) Qualified for the phase indicated

=== Group B ===
Pos	Team	Pld	W	D	L	GF	GA	GD	Pts	Qualification
1	FH (Q)	6	5	1	0	20	4	+16	16	Qualification to the Quarter-finals
2	Valur (Q)	6	4	1	1	19	5	+14	13	Qualification to the Quarter-finals
3	Dalík	6	2	0	4	9	23	−14	6	
4	Völsungur	6	0	0	6	3	19	−16	0	

Rules for classification: 1) points; 2) goal difference; 3) number of goals scored.
(Q) Qualified for the phase indicated

=== Group C ===
Pos	Team	Pld	W	D	L	GF	GA	GD	Pts	Qualification
1	ÍBV (Q)	5	5	0	0	25	1	+24	15	Qualification to the Quarter-finals
2	ÍR (Q)	5	2	2	1	10	14	−4	8	Qualification to the Quarter-finals
3	HK	5	2	0	3	8	8	0	6	
4	Tindastóll	5	1	2	2	6	13	−7	5	
5	KA	5	1	1	3	5	11	−6	4	
6	Haukar	5	1	1	3	2	9	−7	4	

Rules for classification: 1) points; 2) goal difference; 3) number of goals scored.
(Q) Qualified for the phase indicated

=== Group D ===
Pos	Team	Pld	W	D	L	GF	GA	GD	Pts	Qualification
1	Fylkir (Q)	5	5	0	0	17	4	+13	15	Qualification to the Quarter-finals
2	Leiftur (Q)	5	4	0	1	21	3	+18	12	Qualification to the Quarter-finals
3	Þróttur R.	5	2	1	2	13	9	+4	7	
4	Þróttur N.	5	2	0	3	9	11	−2	6	
5	Höttur	5	1	0	4	4	20	−16	3	
6	Lettir	5	0	1	4	3	20	−17	1	

Rules for classification: 1) points; 2) goal difference; 3) number of goals scored.
(Q) Qualified for the phase indicated

=== Group E ===
Pos	Team	Pld	W	D	L	GF	GA	GD	Pts	Qualification
1	Fram (Q)	5	5	0	0	15	5	+10	15	Qualification to the Quarter-finals
2	Grindavík (Q)	5	3	1	1	13	10	+3	10	Qualification to the Quarter-finals
3	Víkingur Reykjavík	5	3	0	2	7	6	+1	9	
4	Víðir	5	2	0	3	7	6	+1	6	
5	Grótta	5	1	0	4	7	14	−7	3	
6	Sindri	5	0	1	4	5	13	−8	1	

Rules for classification: 1) points; 2) goal difference; 3) number of goals scored.
(Q) Qualified for the phase indicated

=== Group F ===
Pos	Team	Pld	W	D	L	GF	GA	GD	Pts	Qualification
1	Breiðablik (Q)	5	5	0	0	29	3	+26	15	Qualification to the Quarter-finals
2	Keflavík (Q)	5	3	0	2	11	5	+6	9	Qualification to the Quarter-finals
3	Þór Akureyri	5	3	0	2	13	9	+4	9	
4	Leiknir Reykjavík	5	3	0	2	8	10	−2	9	
5	Reynir Sandgerði	5	1	0	4	5	20	−15	3	
6	KS	5	0	0	5	4	23	−19	0	

Rules for classification: 1) points; 2) goal difference; 3) number of goals scored.
(Q) Qualified for the phase indicated

== Quarter-finals ==
Team 1	Score	Team 2
1 May 1996
Fram	1–0	Valur
Breiðablik	5–3	ÍR
Fylkir	3–2	Stjarnan
ÍBV	3–0	Keflavík
FH	0–1	Grindavík
ÍA	6–2	Leiftur

== Semi-finals ==
=== Group A ===
Pos	Team	Pld	W	D	L	GF	GA	GD	Pts	Qualification
1	Breiðablik (Q)	2	1	0	1	3	1	+2	3	Qualification to the Final
2	Fylkir	2	1	0	1	3	3	0	3	
3	Grindavík	2	1	0	1	3	5	−2	3	

Rules for classification: 1) points; 2) goal difference; 3) number of goals scored.
(Q) Qualified for the phase indicated

=== Group B ===
Pos	Team	Pld	W	D	L	GF	GA	GD	Pts	Qualification
1	ÍA (Q)	2	1	1	0	6	1	+5	4	Qualification to the Final
2	ÍBV	2	1	1	0	3	1	+2	4	
3	Fram	2	0	0	2	0	7	−7	0	

Rules for classification: 1) points; 2) goal difference; 3) number of goals scored.
(Q) Qualified for the phase indicated

== Final ==
15 May 1996

ÍA	3–1 (a.e.t.)	Breiðablik
Adolfsson 43', 97'; Biberčić 92'		Einarsson 86'

Hafnarfjörður
Referee: Bragi Bergmann

== See also ==
- Icelandic Men's Football Cup
- Knattspyrnusamband Íslands - The Icelandic Football Association
- Icelandic First Division League 1996
