= 2009 Icelandic Men's Football League Cup =

Deildarbikar karla

Tournament details
- Country: Iceland
- Teams: 24

Final positions
- Champions: FH
- Runners-up: Breiðablik

2009 Icelandic Men's Football League Cup was the 14th season of the Icelandic Men's League Cup, a pre-season professional football competition in Iceland. The competition started on 20 February 2009 and concluded on 1 May 2009. FH beat Breiðablik 3–0 in the final and won their fifth League Cup title.

The 24 teams were divided into 4 groups of 6 teams. Every team played every other team of its group once, either home or away. Top 2 teams from each group qualified for the quarter-finals.

== Group stage ==
The games were played from 20 February to 18 April 2009.

=== Group 1 ===
Pos	Team	Pld	W	D	L	GF	GA	GD	Pts	Qualification	BRE	VAL	FJÖ	ÞÓR	KAK	AFT
1	Breiðablik (Q)	5	3	2	0	10	4	+6	11	Qualification to the Quarter-finals	—	0–0	1–0	—	—	6–2
2	Valur (Q)	5	3	2	0	7	1	+6	11	Qualification to the Quarter-finals	—	—	0–0	—	—	3–1
3	Fjölnir	5	3	1	1	11	3	+8	10		—	—	—	3–0	4–1	4–1
4	Þór A.	5	1	2	2	5	8	−3	5		1–1	0–1	—	—	1–1	—
5	KA	5	1	1	3	4	10	−6	4		1–2	0–3	—	—	—	—
6	Afturelding	5	0	0	5	6	17	−11	0		—	—	—	2–3	0–1	—

Source: ksi.is (in Icelandic)
Rules for classification: 1) points; 2) goal difference; 3) number of goals scored.
(Q) Qualified for the phase indicated

=== Group 2 ===
Pos	Team	Pld	W	D	L	GF	GA	GD	Pts	Qualification	GRI	HK	KEF	FRA	ÍR	SEL
1	Grindavík (Q)	5	4	1	0	14	8	+6	13	Qualification to the Quarter-finals	—	—	—	—	3–2	4–3
2	HK (Q)	5	3	1	1	11	9	+2	10	Qualification to the Quarter-finals	2–2	—	3–2	—	—	2–1
3	Keflavík	5	3	0	2	14	11	+3	9		1–3	—	—	4–1	3–2	—
4	Fram	5	2	1	2	10	10	0	7		0–2	3–2	—	—	5–1	—
5	ÍR	5	1	0	4	9	15	−6	3		—	1–2	—	—	—	3–2
6	Selfoss	5	0	1	4	9	14	−5	1		—	—	2–4	1–1	—	—

Source: ksi.is (in Icelandic)
Rules for classification: 1) points; 2) goal difference; 3) number of goals scored.
(Q) Qualified for the phase indicated

=== Group 3 ===
Pos	Team	Pld	W	D	L	GF	GA	GD	Pts	Qualification	STJ	FYL	LRE	KR	VÍK	NJA
1	Stjarnan (Q)	5	4	1	0	16	6	+10	13	Qualification to the Quarter-finals	—	2–2	—	3–2	—	4–0
2	Fylkir (Q)	5	2	3	0	10	8	+2	9	Qualification to the Quarter-finals	—	—	2–2	2–1	—	0–0
3	Leiknir R.	5	2	1	2	8	14	−6	7		1–3	—	—	—	1–0	2–0
4	KR	5	1	2	2	14	9	+5	5		—	—	9–2	—	1–1	—
5	Víkingur Reykjavík	5	1	1	3	9	10	−1	4		1–4	3–4	—	—	—	—
6	Njarðvík	5	0	2	3	1	11	−10	2		—	—	—	1–1	0–4	—

Source: ksi.is (in Icelandic)
Rules for classification: 1) points; 2) goal difference; 3) number of goals scored.
(Q) Qualified for the phase indicated

=== Group 4 ===
Pos	Team	Pld	W	D	L	GF	GA	GD	Pts	Qualification	FH	ÞRÓ	ÍA	ÍBV	HAU	VÓL
1	FH (Q)	5	5	0	0	21	8	+13	15	Qualification to the Quarter-finals	—	—	—	4–3	—	3–0
2	Þróttur Reykjavík (Q)	5	4	0	1	10	5	+5	12	Qualification to the Quarter-finals	0–4	—	—	3–1	1–0	—
3	ÍA	5	2	0	3	11	10	+1	6		3–5	0–1	—	—	—	5–0
4	ÍBV	5	2	0	3	9	10	−1	6		—	—	3–1	—	1–2	—
5	Haukar	5	1	1	3	7	11	−4	4		2–5	—	1–2	—	—	2–2
6	Víkingur Ólafsvík	5	0	1	4	2	16	−14	1		—	0–5	—	0–1	—	—

Source: ksi.is (in Icelandic)
Rules for classification: 1) points; 2) goal difference; 3) number of goals scored.
(Q) Qualified for the phase indicated

== Knockout stage ==
Source: ksi.is (in Icelandic)

=== Quarter-finals ===
The games were played on 22, 23 and 24 April 2009.

Team 1	Score	Team 2
Grindavík	2–3	Fylkir
Breiðablik	1–0 (aet)	Þróttur Reykjavík
Stjarnan	1–6	HK Kópavogs
Valur	0–3	Hafnarfjörður

=== Semi-finals ===
The games were played on 27 April 2009.

Team 1	Score	Team 2
Breiðablik	2–1	HK Kópavogs
Fylkir	1–2	Hafnarfjörður

=== Final ===
1 May 2009
16:00 UTC

Breiðablik	0–3	Hafnarfjörður
		Sverrisson 37'; Vilhjálmsson 65'; Guðnason 83'

Kórinn, Kópavogur
Referee: Jóhannes Valgeirsson
