= 2011 Icelandic Men's Football League Cup =

Deildarbikar karla

Tournament details
- Country: Iceland
- Teams: 24

Final positions
- Champions: Valur
- Runners-up: Fylkir

The 2011 Icelandic Men's Football League Cup was the 16th season of the Icelandic Men's League Cup, a pre-season professional football competition in Iceland. The competition started on 17 February 2011 and concluded on 25 April 2011. KR Reykjavík were the reigning champions, having won their fourth League Cup the year before.

The 24 teams from the Úrvalsdeild karla and 1. deild karla were divided into 3 groups of 8 teams. Every team played every other team of its group once, either home or away. In a change from last year's competition, only four clubs will progress to the knockout stages of the competition. Each group winner and the best group runner-up will enter the semi-finals.

== Group stage ==
The games were played from 17 February to 16 April 2011.

=== Group 1 ===
Pos	Team	Pld	W	D	L	GF	GA	GD	Pts	Qualification	KR	ÍA	KEF	BRE	GRÓ	SEL	ÞÓR	KAK
1	KR (Q)	7	7	0	0	19	5	+14	21	Qualification to the Semi-finals	—	3–1	—	4–0	2–1	2–1	1–0	—
2	ÍA	7	4	1	2	15	7	+8	13		—	—	2–0	—	—	1–2	1–0	—
3	Keflavík	7	3	1	3	15	13	+2	10		2–3	—	—	—	1–1	3–1	—	4–2
4	Breiðablik	7	3	1	3	13	12	+1	10		—	2–2	0–2	—	4–0	—	4–1	—
5	Grótta	7	2	2	3	7	12	−5	8		—	0–3	—	—	—	1–1	—	3–1
6	Selfoss	7	2	2	3	9	16	−7	8		—	—	—	3–0	—	—	—	1–1
7	Þór A.	7	2	0	5	14	13	+1	6		—	—	4–3	—	0–1	8–0	—	1–3
8	KA	7	1	1	5	7	21	−14	4		0–4	0–5	—	0–3	—	—	—	—

Source: ksi.is (in Icelandic)
Rules for classification: 1) points; 2) goal difference; 3) number of goals scored.
(Q) Qualified for the phase indicated

=== Group 2 ===
Pos	Team	Pld	W	D	L	GF	GA	GD	Pts	Qualification	VAL	FRA	ÍBV	FJÖ	LRE	VÓL	VÍK	HK
1	Valur (Q)	7	6	0	1	18	3	+15	18	Qualification to the Semi-finals	—	—	1–0	3–1	—	—	4–1	4–0
2	Fram	7	5	0	2	12	7	+5	15		1–0	—	1–3	1–0	—	3–2	—	3–0
3	ÍBV	7	3	2	2	12	9	+3	11		—	—	—	0–0	—	—	2–1	—
4	Fjölnir	7	3	1	3	14	9	+5	10		—	—	—	—	3–2	0–2	3–1	7–0
5	Leiknir R.	7	3	1	3	12	12	0	10		0–2	2–1	3–1	—	—	—	—	2–1
6	Víkingur Ólafsvík	7	3	1	3	8	12	−4	10		0–4	—	2–2	—	1–0	—	—	—
7	Víkingur Reykjavík	7	2	1	4	11	15	−4	7		—	0–2	—	—	3–3	3–0	—	—
8	HK	7	0	0	7	3	23	−20	0		—	—	1–4	—	—	0–1	1–2	—

Source: ksi.is (in Icelandic)
Rules for classification: 1) points; 2) goal difference; 3) number of goals scored.
(Q) Qualified for the phase indicated

=== Group 3 ===
Pos	Team	Pld	W	D	L	GF	GA	GD	Pts	Qualification	FH	FYL	ÍR	GRI	STJ	BÍB	HAU	ÞRÓ
1	FH (Q)	7	7	0	0	16	3	+13	21	Qualification to the Semi-finals		—	2–0	—	1–0	—	1–0	—
2	Fylkir (Q)	7	5	1	1	11	8	+3	16	Qualification to the Semi-finals	0–2		—	2–1	2–1	—	—	3–2
3	ÍR	7	4	1	2	16	13	+3	13		—	1–1		2–4	—	4–3	2–0	3–0
4	Grindavík	7	4	0	3	12	9	+3	12		1–2	—	—		1–3	2–0	—	—
5	Stjarnan	7	3	0	4	12	11	+1	9		—	—	3–4	—		1–3	3–0	—
6	BÍ/Bolungarvík	7	3	0	4	13	15	−2	9		1–5	0–1	—	—	—		—	—
7	Haukar	7	1	0	6	4	12	−8	3		—	1–2	—	0–1	—	0–3		—
8	Þróttur Reykjavík	7	0	0	7	5	18	−13	0		1–3	—	—	0–2	0–1	2–3	0–3	

Source: ksi.is (in Icelandic)
Rules for classification: 1) points; 2) goal difference; 3) number of goals scored.
(Q) Qualified for the phase indicated

== Knockout stage ==
Source: ksi.is (in Icelandic)

=== Semi-finals ===
The games were played on 20 and 21 April 2011.

Team 1	Score	Team 2
Fylkir	1–0	KR
Valur	2–1	FH

=== Final ===
25 April 2011
16:00 UTC

Fylkir	1–3 (a.e.t.)	Valur
Óskarsson 26'	Report	Lýðsson 70'; Mouritsen 100'; Sveinsson 119'

Kórinn, Kópavogur
Referee: Magnús Þórisson
