= 1999 Icelandic Men's Football League Cup =

Deildarbikar karla

Tournament details
- Country: Iceland
- Teams: 36

Final positions
- Champions: ÍA
- Runners-up: Fylkir

The 1999 Icelandic Men's Football League Cup was the fourth staging of the Icelandic Men's League Cup. It featured 36 teams.

The competition started on 11 March 1999 and concluded on 8 June 1999 with ÍA beating Fylkir 1-0 in the final.

== Details ==
- The 36 teams were divided into 6 groups of 6 teams. Each team plays one match with other teams in the group once. The top 2 teams from each group qualified for the 2nd round along with the best four 3rd placed teams.

== Group stage ==
=== Group A ===
Pos	Team	Pld	W	D	L	GF	GA	GD	Pts	Qualification
1	ÍR (Q)	5	4	1	0	16	2	+14	13	Qualification to the Second round
2	Leiftur (Q)	5	4	1	0	15	1	+14	13	Qualification to the Second round
3	FH (Q)	5	3	0	2	18	11	+7	9	Qualification to the Second round
4	KS	5	1	0	4	5	15	−10	3	
5	Afturelding	5	1	0	4	7	18	−11	3	
6	Selfoss	5	1	0	4	4	18	−14	3	

Rules for classification: 1) points; 2) goal difference; 3) number of goals scored.
(Q) Qualified for the phase indicated

=== Group B ===
Pos	Team	Pld	W	D	L	GF	GA	GD	Pts	Qualification
1	Fram (Q)	5	4	0	1	13	5	+8	12	Qualification to the Second round
2	Þróttur (Q)	5	3	1	1	11	4	+7	10	Qualification to the Second round
3	KA	5	2	2	1	8	5	+3	8	
4	Haukar	5	2	1	2	11	11	0	7	
5	Víðir	5	2	0	3	9	13	−4	6	
6	Völsungur	5	0	0	5	2	16	−14	0	

Rules for classification: 1) points; 2) goal difference; 3) number of goals scored.
(Q) Qualified for the phase indicated

=== Group C ===
Pos	Team	Pld	W	D	L	GF	GA	GD	Pts	Qualification
1	KR (Q)	5	4	1	0	28	6	+22	13	Qualification to the Second round
2	Breiðablik (Q)	5	4	1	0	17	3	+14	13	Qualification to the Second round
3	Stjarnan (Q)	5	3	0	2	15	7	+8	9	Qualification to the Second round
4	Leiknir Reykjavík	5	1	1	3	8	11	−3	4	
5	Reynir Sandgerði	5	1	1	3	6	25	−19	4	
6	Lettir	5	0	0	5	4	26	−22	0	

Rules for classification: 1) points; 2) goal difference; 3) number of goals scored.
(Q) Qualified for the phase indicated

=== Group D ===
Pos	Team	Pld	W	D	L	GF	GA	GD	Pts	Qualification
1	ÍA (Q)	5	4	1	0	17	2	+15	13	Qualification to the Second round
2	Víkingur Reykjavík (Q)	5	3	2	0	20	3	+17	11	Qualification to the Second round
3	Fylkir (Q)	5	3	1	1	34	8	+26	10	Qualification to the Second round
4	Tindastóll	5	2	0	3	14	17	−3	6	
5	Fjölnir	5	1	0	4	3	33	−30	3	
6	Hvöt	5	0	0	5	7	32	−25	0	

Rules for classification: 1) points; 2) goal difference; 3) number of goals scored.
(Q) Qualified for the phase indicated

=== Group E ===
Pos	Team	Pld	W	D	L	GF	GA	GD	Pts	Qualification
1	ÍBV (Q)	5	4	1	0	16	3	+13	13	Qualification to the Second round
2	Skallagrímur (Q)	5	3	1	1	13	9	+4	10	Qualification to the Second round
3	Grindavík (Q)	5	3	0	2	11	8	+3	9	Qualification to the Second round
4	Dalvík	5	0	4	1	6	8	−2	4	
5	Njarðvík	5	1	1	3	4	13	−9	4	
6	Þór Akureyri	5	0	1	4	4	13	−9	1	

Rules for classification: 1) points; 2) goal difference; 3) number of goals scored.
(Q) Qualified for the phase indicated

=== Group F ===
Pos	Team	Pld	W	D	L	GF	GA	GD	Pts	Qualification
1	Valur (Q)	5	4	1	0	16	5	+11	13	Qualification to the Second round
2	Keflavík (Q)	5	4	1	0	13	3	+10	13	Qualification to the Second round
3	KVA	5	2	1	2	15	12	+3	7	
4	Sindri	5	2	0	3	4	7	−3	6	
5	HK	5	1	1	3	8	11	−3	4	
6	Magni	5	0	0	5	2	20	−18	0	

Rules for classification: 1) points; 2) goal difference; 3) number of goals scored.
(Q) Qualified for the phase indicated

== Knockout stage ==
=== Second round ===
Team 1	Score	Team 2
30 April 1999
ÍR	3–2	Stjarnan
ÍBV	2–1	Breiðablik
Fram	1–2	Fylkir
Valur	0–1	Víkingur Reykjavík
KR	4–0	Grindavík
Leiftur	5–0	Skallagrímur
ÍA	3–1	FH
Þróttur	1–0	Keflavík

=== Quarter-finals ===
4 May 1999

ÍR	4–5	ÍBV
Sigurbergsson, Gislason; Steinarsson		Moller,, Gretarsson; Johannesson

4 May 1999

Fylkir	3–0	Víkingur Reykjavík
Helgason; Nikulasson; Own goal

4 May 1999

KR	0–2	Leiftur
		Helgason,

4 May 1999

ÍA	1–0	Þróttur
Hognason

=== Semi-finals ===
11 May 1999

ÍBV	1–2	ÍA
Moller		Hognason; Hauksson

11 May 1999

Fylkir	4–2	Leiftur
Helgason, Tomasson; Steinarsson		Gudmundsson; Dos Santos

=== Final ===
8 June 1999

ÍA	1–0	Fylkir
Haraldsson 88' (pen.)

Laugardalsvöllur, Reykjavík
Referee: Kristinn Jakobsson

== See also ==
- Icelandic Men's Football Cup
- Knattspyrnusamband Íslands - The Icelandic Football Association
- Icelandic First Division League 1999
