= 2013 Icelandic Men's Football League Cup =

Deildarbikar karla

Tournament details
- Country: Iceland
- Teams: 24

Final positions
- Champions: Breiðablik
- Runners-up: Valur

Tournament statistics
- Matches played: 91
- Goals scored: 353 (3.88 per match)
- Top goal scorer: Guðmundur Steinn Hafsteinsson (9)

The 2013 Icelandic Men's Football League Cup was the 18th season of the Icelandic Men's League Cup, a pre-season professional football competition in Iceland. The competition started on 15 February 2013 and concluded on 27 April 2013. KR were the reigning champions, having won their fifth League Cup last year.

The 24 teams from the Úrvalsdeild karla and 1. deild karla were divided into 3 groups of 8 teams. Every team played every other team of its group once, home, away or on a neutral ground for a total of 7 games. Each group winner, each runner-up and the two best third-place finishes entered the quarter-finals.

== Group stage ==
The games were played from 15 February to 20 April 2013.

=== Group 1 ===
Pos	Team	Pld	W	D	L	GF	GA	GD	Pts	Qualification	VÓL	FH	FYL	GRI	ÍBV	FJÖ	BÍB	TIN
1	Víkingur Ólafsvík (Q)	7	6	0	1	18	4	+14	18	Qualification to the Quarter-finals	—	2–1	—	2–1	—	—	3–0	5–0
2	FH (Q)	7	5	0	2	18	11	+7	15	Qualification to the Quarter-finals	—	—	—	2–1	4–3	—	4–0	—
3	Fylkir (Q)	7	4	2	1	14	10	+4	14	Qualification to the Quarter-finals	1–3	3–1	—	3–2	2–2	3–1	1–1	1–0
4	Grindavík	7	3	1	3	15	10	+5	10		—	—	—	—	3–3	1–0	—	4–0
5	ÍBV	7	2	4	1	14	13	+1	10		1–0	—	—	—	—	—	1–0	—
6	Fjölnir	7	1	2	4	7	13	−6	5		0–3	2–4	—	—	2–2	—	0–0	2–0
7	BÍ/Bolungarvík	7	1	2	4	4	12	−8	5		—	—	—	0–3	—	—	—	—
8	Tindastóll	7	0	1	6	2	19	−17	1		—	0–2	—	—	2–2	—	0–3	—

Source: ksi.is (in Icelandic)
Rules for classification: 1) points; 2) goal difference; 3) number of goals scored.
(Q) Qualified for the phase indicated

=== Group 2 ===
Pos	Team	Pld	W	D	L	GF	GA	GD	Pts	Qualification	VAL	BRE	ÍA	FRA	VÍK	SEL	KAK	VÖL
1	Valur (Q)	7	6	0	1	21	9	+12	18	Qualification to the Quarter-finals	—	—	—	—	5–4	3–1	2–0	—
2	Breiðablik (Q)	7	5	1	1	19	8	+11	16	Qualification to the Quarter-finals	2–0	—	—	—	—	3–1	4–1	—
3	ÍA (Q)	7	3	2	2	18	13	+5	11	Qualification to the Quarter-finals	1–3	2–2	—	3–2	—	—	—	7–0
4	Fram	7	3	1	3	13	9	+4	10		1–4	2–0	—	—	—	4–0	—	1–1
5	Víkingur Reykjavík	7	3	0	4	18	17	+1	9		—	1–4	1–2	0–3	—	3–1	—	5–0
6	Selfoss	7	3	0	4	13	16	−3	9		—	—	4–2	—	—	—	2–1	—
7	KA	7	1	2	4	7	14	−7	5		—	—	1–1	1–0	2–4	—	—	—
8	Völsungur	7	0	2	5	3	26	−23	2		0–4	1–4	—	—	—	0–4	1–1	—

Source: ksi.is (in Icelandic)
Rules for classification: 1) points; 2) goal difference; 3) number of goals scored.
(Q) Qualified for the phase indicated

=== Group 3 ===
Pos	Team	Pld	W	D	L	GF	GA	GD	Pts	Qualification	KR	STJ	ÞÓR	LRE	ÞRÓ	KEF	HAU	KF
1	KR (Q)	7	7	0	0	27	5	+22	21	Qualification to the Quarter-finals	—	1–0	8–0	—	4–1	6–2	—	3–0
2	Stjarnan (Q)	7	4	1	2	18	12	+6	13	Qualification to the Quarter-finals	—	—	—	—	—	—	1–0	5–0
3	Þór A.	7	3	2	2	18	20	−2	11		—	3–5	—	—	—	3–1	2–2	4–0
4	Leiknir R.	7	3	1	3	18	16	+2	10		1–3	3–4	2–2	—	2–0	—	3–1	6–0
5	Þróttur Reykjavík	7	3	0	4	14	14	0	9		—	3–1	2–4	—	—	3–0	2–3	3–0
6	Keflavík	7	2	2	3	13	16	−3	8		—	2–2	—	6–1	—	—	1–1	1–0
7	Haukar	7	1	3	3	11	14	−3	6		1–2	—	—	—	—	—	—	3–3
8	KF	7	0	1	6	3	25	−22	1		—	—	—	—	—	—	—	—

Source: ksi.is (in Icelandic)
Rules for classification: 1) points; 2) goal difference; 3) number of goals scored.
(Q) Qualified for the phase indicated

== Knockout stage ==
The final round saw the 8 progressed teams meet in a knockout stage to determine the winner of the 2013 League Cup.

=== Quarter-finals ===
The games were played on 18 and 19 April 2013.

Team 1	Score	Team 2
Valur	2−0	Fylkir
KR	1−3	Breiðablik
ÍA	2−4	Víkingur Ó.
Stjarnan	3−1	FH

=== Semi-finals ===
The games were played on 22 April 2013.

Team 1	Score	Team 2
Víkingur Ó.	1−2	Breiðablik
Valur	2−1	Stjarnan

=== Final ===
27 April 2013
16:00 GMT

Breiðablik	3−2	Valur
Jobe 8' (o.g.); Vilhjálmsson 11'; Aðalsteinsson 32'	Report	Kárason 18'; Williamson 72'

Samsung völlurinn, Garðabær
Attendance: 384
Referee: Gunnar Jarl Jónsson

== Top goalscorers ==
As of 27 April 2013.

Rank	Player	Club	Goals	Matches	Ratio
1	Guðmundur Steinn Hafsteinsson	Víkingur Ó.	9	8	1.13
2	Halldór Orri Björnsson	Stjarnan	8	9	0.89
3	Eggert Kári Karlsson	ÍA	7	7	1.00
4	Atli Guðnason	FH	6	7	0.86
4	Kolbeinn Kárason	Valur	6	9	0.67
4	Elfar Árni Aðalsteinsson	Breiðablik	6	10	0.60
7	Viðar Örn Kjartansson	Fylkir	5	6	0.83
7	Hjörtur Júlíus Hjartarson	Víkingur R.	5	6	0.83
7	Jóhann Þórhallsson	Þór A.	5	6	0.83
7	Ingi Rafn Ingibergsson	Selfoss	5	6	0.83
7	Kristinn Freyr Sigurðsson	Valur	5	7	0.71
