= 1998 Icelandic Men's Football League Cup =

Deildarbikar karla

Tournament details
- Country: Iceland
- Teams: 34

Final positions
- Champions: KR
- Runners-up: Valur

The 1998 Icelandic Men's Football League Cup was the third staging of the Icelandic Men's League Cup. It featured 34 teams.

The competition started on 13 March 1998 and concluded on 26 August 1998 with KR beating Valur 6-5 on penalties in the final.

== Details ==
- The 34 teams were divided into 5 groups of 6 teams and 1 group of 4 teams. In the 4 team group, each team played other teams twice. In the 6 team groups, each team plays one match with other teams in the group once. The top 2 teams from each group qualified for the 2nd round along with the best four 3rd placed teams from the groups with 6 teams.

== Group stage ==
=== Group A ===
Pos	Team	Pld	W	D	L	GF	GA	GD	Pts	Qualification
1	FH (Q)	6	4	2	0	14	4	+10	14	Qualification to the Second round
2	Keflavík (Q)	6	4	1	1	17	6	+11	13	Qualification to the Second round
3	Grindavík	6	1	1	4	9	12	−3	4	
4	Selfoss	6	1	0	5	5	23	−18	3	

Rules for classification: 1) points; 2) goal difference; 3) number of goals scored.
(Q) Qualified for the phase indicated

=== Group B ===
Pos	Team	Pld	W	D	L	GF	GA	GD	Pts	Qualification
1	ÍBV (Q)	5	4	1	0	25	4	+21	13	Qualification to the Second round
2	Valur (Q)	5	4	1	0	21	6	+15	13	Qualification to the Second round
3	Fylkir (Q)	5	2	1	2	14	11	+3	7	Qualification to the Second round
4	Víðir	5	1	2	2	16	14	+2	5	
5	Sindri	5	1	1	3	5	11	−6	4	
6	Þróttur N.	5	0	0	5	3	38	−35	0	

Rules for classification: 1) points; 2) goal difference; 3) number of goals scored.
(Q) Qualified for the phase indicated

=== Group C ===
Pos	Team	Pld	W	D	L	GF	GA	GD	Pts	Qualification
1	Leiftur (Q)	5	4	0	1	18	3	+15	12	Qualification to the Second round
2	ÍR (Q)	5	3	2	0	14	4	+10	11	Qualification to the Second round
3	HK (Q)	5	3	0	2	10	11	−1	9	Qualification to the Second round
4	Þór Akureyri	5	2	1	2	7	4	+3	7	
5	Njarðvík	5	1	0	4	2	17	−15	3	
6	Fjölnir	5	0	1	4	3	15	−12	1	

Rules for classification: 1) points; 2) goal difference; 3) number of goals scored.
(Q) Qualified for the phase indicated

=== Group D ===
Pos	Team	Pld	W	D	L	GF	GA	GD	Pts	Qualification
1	Stjarnan (Q)	5	4	0	1	9	3	+6	12	Qualification to the Second round
2	KR (Q)	5	2	2	1	9	5	+4	8	Qualification to the Second round
3	Leiknir Reykjavík	5	2	1	2	10	8	+2	7	
4	Afturelding	5	2	1	2	5	5	0	7	
5	KA	5	1	1	3	6	10	−4	4	
6	KS	5	1	1	3	6	14	−8	4	

Rules for classification: 1) points; 2) goal difference; 3) number of goals scored.
(Q) Qualified for the phase indicated

=== Group E ===
Pos	Team	Pld	W	D	L	GF	GA	GD	Pts	Qualification
1	Breiðablik (Q)	5	4	0	1	25	7	+18	12	Qualification to the Second round
2	ÍA (Q)	5	4	0	1	18	5	+13	12	Qualification to the Second round
3	Þróttur R. (Q)	5	3	0	2	14	5	+9	9	Qualification to the Second round
4	Völsungur	5	2	0	3	7	12	−5	6	
5	Dalvík	5	2	0	3	5	19	−14	6	
6	Reynir Sandgerði	5	0	0	5	0	21	−21	0	

Rules for classification: 1) points; 2) goal difference; 3) number of goals scored.
(Q) Qualified for the phase indicated

=== Group F ===
Pos	Team	Pld	W	D	L	GF	GA	GD	Pts	Qualification
1	Tindastóll (Q)	5	4	0	1	10	8	+2	12	Qualification to the Second round
2	Fram (Q)	5	3	1	1	18	6	+12	10	Qualification to the Second round
3	Haukar (Q)	5	3	0	2	4	5	−1	9	Qualification to the Second round
4	Skallagrímur	5	2	1	2	14	9	+5	7	
5	Víkingur Reykjavík	5	2	0	3	5	6	−1	6	
6	Ægir	5	0	0	5	3	20	−17	0	

Rules for classification: 1) points; 2) goal difference; 3) number of goals scored.
(Q) Qualified for the phase indicated

== Knockout stage ==
=== Second round ===
Team 1	Score	Team 2
28 April 1998
ÍBV	6–2	HK
29 April 1998
Tindastóll	0–1	KR
FH	2–1	Fylkir
Leiftur	2–2 (a.e.t.); 4−3 (pen)	Þróttur R.
Breiðablik	0–0 (a.e.t.); 4−5 (pen)	ÍR
Keflavík	0–1 (a.e.t.)	ÍA
Valur	1–0	Fram
Stjarnan	2–1	Haukar

=== Quarter-finals ===
2 May 1998

FH	3–1	ÍR
Saevarsson; Gardarsson; Magnusson		A. Davidsson

2 May 1998

Stjarnan	1–4	Valur
Gunnarsson		Hreidarsson, Stefansson; Magnusson

2 May 1998

Leiftur	1–1 (a.e.t.)	ÍA
Ingimundarson		Gislason
Penalties
	5–6

4 May 1998

ÍBV	2–3	KR
Johannesson,		Juliusson; Jakobsson; Benediktsson

=== Semi-finals ===
5 May 1998

FH	1–3	Valur
Gestsson		Stefansson; Magnusson; Juliusson

7 May 1998

KR	0–0 (a.e.t.)	ÍA
Penalties
	4–3

=== Final ===
26 August 1998

KR	2–2 (a.e.t.)	Valur
Haxhiajdini 60'; Hinriksson 95'		Guðjohnsen 30'; Juliusson 109'
Penalties
	6–5

Laugardalsvöllur, Reykjavík
Referee: Gylfi Thor Orrason

== See also ==
- Icelandic Men's Football Cup
- Knattspyrnusamband Íslands - The Icelandic Football Association
- Icelandic First Division League 1998
