= 2000 Icelandic Men's Football League Cup =

Deildarbikar karla

Tournament details
- Country: Iceland
- Teams: 36

Final positions
- Champions: Grindavík
- Runners-up: Valur

The 2000 Icelandic Men's Football League Cup was the fifth staging of the Icelandic Men's League Cup. 36 teams took part.

The competition started on 3 March 2000 and concluded on 4 September 2000 with Grindavík beating Valur 4-0 in the final.

== Details ==
- The 36 teams were divided into six groups of six teams. Each team played one match with other teams in the group once. The top two teams from each group qualified for the second round along with the best four third placed teams.

== Group stage ==
=== Group A ===
Pos	Team	Pld	W	D	L	GF	GA	GD	Pts	Qualification
1	Dalvík	5	5	0	0	14	4	+10	15	Qualification to the Second round
2	Leiftur (Q)	5	4	0	1	14	6	+8	12	Qualification to the Second round
3	Fylkir (Q)	5	3	0	2	12	7	+5	9	Qualification to the Second round
4	Víðir	5	2	0	3	11	10	+1	6	
5	Haukar	5	1	0	4	3	12	−9	3	
6	Lettir	5	0	0	5	4	19	−15	0	

Rules for classification: 1) points; 2) goal difference; 3) number of goals scored.
(Q) Qualified for the phase indicated

=== Group B ===
Pos	Team	Pld	W	D	L	GF	GA	GD	Pts	Qualification
1	Grindavík (Q)	5	4	1	0	18	3	+15	13	Qualification to the Second round
2	Víkingur Reykjavík (Q)	5	3	2	0	18	3	+15	11	Qualification to the Second round
3	Sindri	5	2	1	2	5	8	−3	7	
4	Þróttur	5	1	3	1	9	7	+2	6	
5	Afturelding	5	1	0	4	4	16	−12	3	
6	Huginn/Höttur	5	0	1	4	5	22	−17	1	

Rules for classification: 1) points; 2) goal difference; 3) number of goals scored.
(Q) Qualified for the phase indicated

=== Group C ===
Pos	Team	Pld	W	D	L	GF	GA	GD	Pts	Qualification
1	KR (Q)	5	3	2	0	17	4	+13	11	Qualification to the Second round
2	Tindastóll (Q)	5	3	2	0	11	4	+7	11	Qualification to the Second round
3	FH (Q)	5	2	3	0	19	7	+12	9	Qualification to the Second round
4	Fram	5	2	1	2	12	9	+3	7	
5	KS	5	0	1	4	1	18	−17	1	
6	Njarðvík	5	0	1	4	5	23	−18	1	

Rules for classification: 1) points; 2) goal difference; 3) number of goals scored.
(Q) Qualified for the phase indicated

=== Group D ===
Pos	Team	Pld	W	D	L	GF	GA	GD	Pts	Qualification
1	ÍA (Q)	5	5	0	0	24	3	+21	15	Qualification to the Second round
2	Stjarnan (Q)	5	4	0	1	21	7	+14	12	Qualification to the Second round
3	Skallagrímur (Q)	5	3	0	2	12	17	−5	9	Qualification to the Second round
4	Selfoss	5	2	0	3	18	21	−3	6	
5	Fjölnir	5	1	0	4	13	20	−7	3	
6	KÍB	5	0	0	5	2	22	−20	0	

Rules for classification: 1) points; 2) goal difference; 3) number of goals scored.
(Q) Qualified for the phase indicated

=== Group E ===
Pos	Team	Pld	W	D	L	GF	GA	GD	Pts	Qualification
1	Valur (Q)	5	4	1	0	19	6	+13	13	Qualification to the Second round
2	Breiðablik (Q)	5	4	0	1	19	13	+6	12	Qualification to the Second round
3	KA (Q)	5	2	1	2	18	13	+5	7	Qualification to the Second round
4	HK	5	1	1	3	6	11	−5	4	
5	Hamar/Ægir	5	1	1	3	4	14	−10	4	
6	Þór Akureyri	5	1	0	4	6	15	−9	3	

Rules for classification: 1) points; 2) goal difference; 3) number of goals scored.
(Q) Qualified for the phase indicated

=== Group F ===
Pos	Team	Pld	W	D	L	GF	GA	GD	Pts	Qualification
1	Keflavík (Q)	5	4	1	0	29	3	+26	13	Qualification to the Second round
2	ÍBV (Q)	5	4	1	0	19	5	+14	13	Qualification to the Second round
3	Leiknir Reykjavík	5	2	1	2	8	13	−5	7	
4	ÍR	5	1	2	2	11	8	+3	5	
5	KFS	5	1	1	3	8	17	−9	4	
6	Bruni	5	0	0	5	3	32	−29	0	

Rules for classification: 1) points; 2) goal difference; 3) number of goals scored.
(Q) Qualified for the phase indicated

== Knockout stage ==
=== Second round ===
Team 1	Score	Team 2
1 May 2000
Dalvík	1–5	FH
Keflavík	2–0	Stjarnan
Víkingur Reykjavík	1–3	ÍBV
Grindavík	2–1	Skallagrímur
KR	0–1	KA
ÍA	1–3	Fylkir
Leiftur	2–1	Breiðablik
Valur	2–1	Tindastóll

=== Quarter-finals ===
4 May 2000

KA	2–3	Leiftur
Jonsson,		Dos Santos; Joensen; Da Silva

4 May 2000

Fylkir	2–0	ÍBV
Oskarsson; Sverrisson

4 May 2000

FH	3–5 (a.e.t.)	Valur
Bjarnason; Arnarson; Gardarsson		Vilhjalmsson, Guðjohnsen; Snorrason; Gudmundsson

4 May 2000

Keflavík	1–5	Grindavík
Jonsson		Djuric; McShane, Kekic,

=== Semi-finals ===
7 May 2000

Grindavík	7–1	Leiftur
McShane; Bjarnason; Ramsey,, Sverrisson; Kekić		Johannsson

8 May 2000

Valur	2–2 (a.e.t.)	Fylkir
Sveinsson; Guðjohnsen		Gislason; Helgason
Penalties
	8–7

=== Final ===
4 September 2000

Grindavík	4–0	Valur
Sverrisson 8'; Lukić 35'; Kekić 66'; Bjarnason 89'

Laugardalsvöllur, Reykjavík
Attendance: 511
Referee: Egill Mar Markusson

== See also ==
- Icelandic Men's Football Cup
- Knattspyrnusamband Íslands - The Icelandic Football Association
- Icelandic First Division League 2000
