= 2015 Icelandic Men's Football League Cup =

Deildarbikar karla

Tournament details
- Country: Iceland
- Dates: 13 February – 23 April
- Teams: 24

Final positions
- Champions: Breiðablik (2nd title)
- Runners-up: KA

Tournament statistics
- Matches played: 91
- Goals scored: 317 (3.48 per match)

The 2015 Icelandic Men's Football League Cup was the 20th season of the Icelandic Men's League Cup, a pre-season professional football competition in Iceland. The competition started on 13 February 2015 and concluded on 23 April 2015. FH is the reigning champions, having won their sixth League Cup last year.

The 24 teams from the Úrvalsdeild and 1. deild karla were divided into 3 groups of 8 teams. Every team plays every other team of its group once, home, away or on a neutral ground for a total of 7 games. Each group winner, each runner-up and the two best third-place finishes enter the quarter-finals.

== Group stage ==
The games were played from 13 February to 11 April 2015.

=== Group 1 ===
Pos	Team	Pld	W	D	L	GF	GA	GD	Pts	Qualification	FYL	BRE	FH	HK	ÍBV	ÞRÓ	VÓL	BÍB
1	Fylkir (Q)	7	5	1	1	19	3	+16	16	Qualification to the Quarter-finals	—	0–0	1–2	—	4–0	—	2–0	5–0
2	Breiðablik (Q)	7	5	1	1	15	5	+10	16	Qualification to the Quarter-finals	—	—	3–0	—	0–3 (Note: Breiðablik played with an ineligible player, the original result was 2−0.)	3–1	4–1	4–0
3	FH (Q)	7	5	0	2	13	8	+5	15	Qualification to the Quarter-finals	—	—	—	—	2–0	—	—	1–0
4	HK	7	4	0	3	11	7	+4	12		0–3	0–1	2–1	—	0–2	—	1–0	5–0
5	ÍBV	7	3	1	3	10	12	−2	10		—	—	—	—	—	—	0–1	5–0
6	Þróttur Reykjavík	7	2	0	5	12	14	−2	6		1–4	—	2–3	0–3	5–0	—	—	2–0
7	Víkingur Ólafsvík	7	2	1	4	7	12	−5	7		—	—	0–4	—	—	1–1	—	—
8	BÍ/Bolungarvík	7	1	1	5	0	26	−26	4		—	—	—	—	—	—	0–4	—

Source: ksi.is (in Icelandic)
Legend: Blue = home team win; Yellow = draw; Red = away team win.
Rules for classification: 1) points; 2) goal difference; 3) number of goals scored.
(Q) Qualified for the phase indicated

=== Group 2 ===
Pos	Team	Pld	W	D	L	GF	GA	GD	Pts	Qualification	VÍK	LRE	KR	FJÖ	KAK	SEL	GRÓ	FRA
1	Víkingur Reykjavík (Q)	7	5	1	1	20	12	+8	16	Qualification to the Quarter-finals	—	0–3	4–3	2–0	—	3–1	3–3	—
2	Leiknir R. (Note: Leiknir and KR have decided not to enter in the knockout stages.)	7	5	1	1	16	9	+7	16		—	—	—	1–1	3–2	2–1	4–2	—
3	KR	7	3	2	2	13	9	+4	11		—	2–1	—	0–1	—	—	—	1–0
4	Fjölnir (Q)	7	3	1	3	8	8	0	10	Qualification to the Quarter-finals	—	—	—	—	1–0	2–3	1–0	3–0
5	KA (Q)	7	2	2	3	12	9	+3	8	Qualification to the Quarter-finals	2–3	—	2–2	—	—	—	0–0	2–0
6	Selfoss	7	2	2	3	10	14	−4	8		—	—	1–1	—	0–4	—	1–1	—
7	Grótta	7	1	3	3	9	14	−5	6		—	—	0–4	—	—	—	—	—
8	Fram	7	1	0	6	4	17	−13	3		0–5	1–2	—	—	—	1–3	2–1	—

Source: ksi.is (in Icelandic)
Legend: Blue = home team win; Yellow = draw; Red = away team win.
Rules for classification: 1) points; 2) goal difference; 3) number of goals scored.
(Q) Qualified for the phase indicated

=== Group 3 ===
Pos	Team	Pld	W	D	L	GF	GA	GD	Pts	Qualification	ÍA	VAL	STJ	GRI	KEF	KFF	HAU	ÞÓR
1	ÍA (Q)	7	6	0	1	18	13	+5	18	Qualification to the Quarter-finals	—	—	2–0	3–2	2–1	4–3	4–3	—
2	Valur (Q)	7	5	2	0	18	9	+9	17	Qualification to the Quarter-finals	3–1	—	1–1	3–2	—	—	—	3–2
3	Stjarnan (Note: Stjarnan decided not to enter in the knockout stages.)	7	5	1	1	14	5	+9	16		—	—	—	3–1	—	—	—	1–0
4	Grindavík	7	2	1	4	17	18	−1	7		—	—	—	—	—	1–1	—	—
5	Keflavík	7	2	1	4	13	16	−3	7		—	3–3	0–2	4–2	—	—	1–3	2–1
6	Fjarðabyggð	7	2	1	4	12	18	−6	7		—	0–2	1–6	—	3–2	—	—	1–2
7	Haukar	7	2	0	5	12	17	−5	6		—	1–2 (Note: Haukar played with an ineligible player, the original result was 1−2.)	0–1	2–3	—	1–3	—	—
8	Þór A.	7	1	0	6	10	18	−8	3		1–2	—	—	2–6	—	—	2–3	—

Source: ksi.is (in Icelandic)
Legend: Blue = home team win; Yellow = draw; Red = away team win.
Rules for classification: 1) points; 2) goal difference; 3) number of goals scored.
(Q) Qualified for the phase indicated

== Knockout stage ==
The top two teams of each group and the two best third-place entered the quarterfinals.

=== Quarter-finals ===
Team 1	Score	Team 2
16 April 2015
Víkingur R.	1−1 (4−1 p)	FH
ÍA	5−1	Fjölnir
Fylkir	1−5	KA
Breiðablik	5−1	Valur

=== Semi-finals ===
Team 1	Score	Team 2
19 April 2015
Víkingur R.	0−1	Breiðablik
KA	1−1 (4−2 p)	ÍA

=== Final ===
23 April 2015
19:00

Breiðablik	1–0	KA
Hreinsson 6'	Report

Kórinn, Kópavogur
Attendance: 650
Referee: Garðar Örn Hinriksson
