= 2002 Icelandic Men's Football League Cup =

Deildarbikar karla

Tournament details
- Country: Iceland
- Teams: 16

Final positions
- Champions: FH
- Runners-up: Fylkir

The 2002 Icelandic Men's Football League Cup was the seventh staging of the Icelandic Men's League Cup. It featured all the 2001 Úrvalsdeild karla teams and the top 6 teams from 1. deild karla in 2001.

The competition started on 15 February 2002 and concluded on 7 May 2002 with FH beating Fylkir 4–3 on penalties in the final.

== Details ==
- The 16 teams were divided into 2 groups of 8 teams. Each team plays one match with other teams in the group once. The top 4 teams from each group qualified for the quarter-finals.

== Group stage ==
=== Group A ===
| Pos | Team | Pld | W | D | L | GF | GA | GD | Pts | Qualification |
|---|---|---|---|---|---|---|---|---|---|---|
| 1 | FH (Q) | 7 | 5 | 1 | 1 | 14 | 5 | +9 | 16 | Qualification to the Quarter-finals |
| 2 | Fylkir (Q) | 7 | 4 | 1 | 2 | 15 | 8 | +7 | 13 | Qualification to the Quarter-finals |
| 3 | Breiðablik (Q) | 7 | 4 | 0 | 3 | 15 | 11 | +4 | 12 | Qualification to the Quarter-finals |
| 4 | ÍA (Q) | 7 | 4 | 0 | 3 | 13 | 10 | +3 | 12 | Qualification to the Quarter-finals |
| 5 | KR | 7 | 3 | 1 | 3 | 14 | 9 | +5 | 10 | |
| 6 | Stjarnan | 7 | 3 | 1 | 3 | 10 | 15 | −5 | 10 | |
| 7 | Þór Akureyri | 7 | 1 | 1 | 5 | 10 | 18 | −8 | 4 | |
| 8 | Víkingur Reykjavík | 7 | 1 | 1 | 5 | 7 | 22 | −15 | 4 | |

Rules for classification: 1) points; 2) goal difference; 3) number of goals scored.
(Q) Qualified for the phase indicated

=== Group B ===
| Pos | Team | Pld | W | D | L | GF | GA | GD | Pts | Qualification |
|---|---|---|---|---|---|---|---|---|---|---|
| 1 | KA (Q) | 7 | 5 | 2 | 0 | 16 | 4 | +12 | 17 | Qualification to the Quarter-finals |
| 2 | Fram (Q) | 7 | 4 | 1 | 2 | 16 | 8 | +8 | 13 | Qualification to the Quarter-finals |
| 3 | Keflavík (Q) | 7 | 4 | 0 | 3 | 14 | 10 | +4 | 12 | Qualification to the Quarter-finals |
| 4 | Valur (Q) | 7 | 3 | 2 | 2 | 13 | 7 | +6 | 11 | Qualification to the Quarter-finals |
| 5 | Grindavík | 7 | 3 | 1 | 3 | 14 | 15 | −1 | 10 | |
| 6 | Þróttur | 7 | 2 | 2 | 3 | 7 | 9 | −2 | 8 | |
| 7 | ÍBV | 7 | 2 | 1 | 4 | 8 | 16 | −8 | 7 | |
| 8 | Dalvík | 7 | 0 | 1 | 6 | 7 | 26 | −19 | 1 | |

Rules for classification: 1) points; 2) goal difference; 3) number of goals scored.
(Q) Qualified for the phase indicated

== Knockout stage ==
=== Quarter-finals ===
25 April 2002

| FH | 6–0 | Valur |
|---|---|---|
| Stefansson 15'; Moller 54', 65'; Saevarsson 81', 88'; Gudjonsson 90' |

25 April 2002

| Fram | 0–1 | Breiðablik |
|---|---|---|
| | | Baldurs 49' |

25 April 2002

| Fylkir | 3–1 | Keflavík |
|---|---|---|
| Valdimarsson 20'; Gislasonn 24', 44' | | Steinarsson 13' (pen.) |

25 April 2002

| KA | 0–1 | ÍA |
|---|---|---|
| | | Hjartarson 53' |

=== Semi-finals ===
2 May 2002

| ÍA | 1–2 (a.e.t.) | Fylkir |
|---|---|---|
| Bjornsson 57' | | Gislason 85'; Kolbeinsson 91' |

2 May 2002

| FH | 4–3 (a.e.t.) | Breiðablik |
|---|---|---|
| Gudjonsson 37'; Asthorsson 87', 115'; Gardarsson 105' | | Einarsson 61' (pen.); Thorsteinsson 63'; Sigurdsson 102' |

=== Final ===
7 May 2002

| FH | 2–2 (a.e.t.) | Fylkir |
|---|---|---|
| Stefansson 10'; Gardarsson 20' | | Asbjornsson 2'; Kolbeinsson 57' |
Penalties
| | 4–3 |

Egilshöll, Reykjavík
Referee: Johannes Valgeirsson

== See also ==
- Icelandic Men's Football Cup
- Knattspyrnusamband Íslands - The Icelandic Football Association
- Icelandic First Division League 2002
