= 2012 Icelandic Men's Football League Cup =

Deildarbikar karla

Tournament details
- Country: Iceland
- Teams: 24

Final positions
- Champions: KR
- Runners-up: Fram

Tournament statistics
- Matches played: 91
- Goals scored: 325 (3.57 per match)
- Top goal scorer(s): Mark Doninger (ÍA) (7); Kristinn Ingi Halldórsson (Fram) (7)

The 2012 Icelandic Men's Football League Cup was the 17th season of the Icelandic Men's League Cup, a pre-season professional football competition in Iceland. The competition started on 16 February 2012 and concluded on 28 April 2012. Valur were the reigning champions, having won their second League Cup the year before.

The 24 teams from the Úrvalsdeild karla and 1. deild karla were divided into 3 groups of 8 teams. Every team played every other team of its group once, home, away or on a neutral ground. In a change from last year's competition, eight clubs again progress to the knockout stages of the competition. Each group winner, each group runner-up and the best two third-place finishes will enter the quarter-finals.

Although ÍA qualified for the elimination phase, they had already planned a tour, so they canceled their further participation, which gave Víkingur R. the opportunity to win the trophy. On 18 April it was confirmed that Víkingur used an illegal player at their game against Stjarnan, which originally ended 2−2. FSI awarded a 3-0 victory to Stjarnan, so they played in the quarterfinals.

== Group stage ==
The games were played from 16 February to 15 April 2012.

=== Group 1 ===
Pos	Team	Pld	W	D	L	GF	GA	GD	Pts	Qualification	FRA	KR	BRE	HAU	VÓL	SEL	ÞRÓ	BÍB
1	Fram (Q)	7	7	0	0	21	6	+15	21	Qualification to the Quarter-finals	—	—	—	5–1	3–2	2–0	3–1	3–0
2	KR (Q)	7	5	0	2	16	10	+6	15	Qualification to the Quarter-finals	1–2	—	3–2	0–2	3–2	—	—	4–2
3	Breiðablik (Q)	7	4	1	2	15	8	+7	13	Qualification to the Quarter-finals	1–3	—	—	1–0	1–1	1–0	—	—
4	Haukar	7	3	1	3	9	11	−2	10		—	—	—	—	—	—	3–2	1–1
5	Víkingur Ólafsvík	7	2	3	2	13	13	0	9		—	—	—	2–1	—	2–2	—	2–1
6	Selfoss	7	1	1	5	5	10	−5	4		—	0–1	—	0–1	—	—	—	—
7	Þróttur Reykjavík	7	1	1	5	11	18	−7	4		—	0–4	1–2	—	2–2	2–3	—	3–1
8	BÍ/Bolungarvík	7	1	1	5	6	20	−14	4		—	—	0–7	—	—	1–0	—	—

Source: ksi.is (in Icelandic)
Rules for classification: 1) points; 2) goal difference; 3) number of goals scored.
(Q) Qualified for the phase indicated

=== Group 2 ===
Pos	Team	Pld	W	D	L	GF	GA	GD	Pts	Qualification	KEF	ÍA	STJ	VÍK	KAK	ÍBV	ÍR	TIN
1	Keflavík (Q)	7	6	0	1	20	9	+11	18	Qualification to the Quarter-finals	—	2–1	3–2	—	2–1	—	—	7–0
2	ÍA	7	5	1	1	19	8	+11	16		—	—	3–1	1–1	4–1	—	—	4–1
3	Stjarnan (Q)	7	4	1	2	14	10	+4	13	Qualification to the Quarter-finals	—	—	—	—	—	1–0	—	1–1
4	Víkingur Reykjavík	7	3	2	2	14	9	+5	11		4–2	—	0–3	—	—	2–3	3–0	4–0
5	KA	7	3	1	3	13	10	+3	10		—	—	2–3	0–0	—	—	2–0	5–0
6	ÍBV	7	3	0	4	15	12	+3	9		1–3	1–2	—	—	1–2	—	—	—
7	ÍR	7	1	0	6	6	18	−12	3		0–1	1–4	1–3	—	—	2–4	—	2–1
8	Tindastóll	7	0	1	6	3	28	−25	1		—	—	—	—	—	0–5	—	—

Source: ksi.is (in Icelandic)
Rules for classification: 1) points; 2) goal difference; 3) number of goals scored.
(Q) Qualified for the phase indicated

=== Group 3 ===
Pos	Team	Pld	W	D	L	GF	GA	GD	Pts	Qualification	VAL	FH	ÞÓR	GRI	LRE	FYL	FJÖ	HÖT
1	Valur (Q)	7	6	1	0	24	4	+20	19	Qualification to the Quarter-finals	—	2–0	—	—	—	2–2	4–2	5–0
2	FH (Q)	7	4	2	1	15	7	+8	14	Qualification to the Quarter-finals	—	—	—	—	—	—	—	7–1
3	Þór A. (Q)	7	4	1	2	11	8	+3	13	Qualification to the Quarter-finals	0–4	1–1	—	4–0	3–1	—	—	—
4	Grindavík	7	2	3	2	10	11	−1	9		0–3	0–0	—	—	—	4–1	—	4–1
5	Leiknir R.	7	2	2	3	11	17	−6	8		0–4	1–3	—	1–1	—	—	—	6–5
6	Fylkir	7	2	1	4	11	14	−3	7		—	2–3	0–1	—	0–1	—	—	—
7	Fjölnir	7	1	2	4	10	14	−4	5		—	0–1	1–0	1–1	1–1	2–3	—	—
8	Höttur	7	1	0	6	13	30	−17	3		—	—	1–2	—	—	1–3	4–3	—

Source: ksi.is (in Icelandic)
Rules for classification: 1) points; 2) goal difference; 3) number of goals scored.
(Q) Qualified for the phase indicated

== Knockout stage ==
The eight progressed teams played a knockout-round to determine the winner of the 2012 League Cup.

=== Quarter-finals ===
The games were played on 18 and 19 April 2012.

Team 1	Score	Team 2
Valur	1−2	Stjarnan
Keflavík	1−2 (a.e.t.)	Breiðablik
Fram	4−0	Þór
KR	2–2 (a.e.t.) (5−4 p)	FH

=== Semi-finals ===
The games were played on 23 April 2012.

Team 1	Score	Team 2
Breiðablik	0−2	KR
Fram	2−1 (a.e.t.)	Stjarnan

=== Final ===
28 April 2012
16:00 GMT

KR	1−0	Fram
Ragnarsson 57'	Report

Kórinn, Kópavogur
Attendance: 627
Referee: Guðmundur Ársæll Guðmundsson
