= 2010 Icelandic Men's Football League Cup =

Deildarbikar karla

Tournament details
- Country: Iceland
- Teams: 24

Final positions
- Champions: KR Reykjavík
- Runners-up: Breiðablik

2010 Icelandic Men's Football League Cup was the 15th season of the Icelandic Men's League Cup, a pre-season professional football competition in Iceland. The competition started on 20 February 2010 and concluded on 1 May 2010. KR Reykjavík beat Breiðablik 2–1 in the final and won their fourth League Cup title.

The 24 teams were divided into 3 groups of 8 teams. Every team played every other team of its group once, either home or away. Top 2 teams from each group and the two best third-placed qualified for the quarter-finals.

== Group stage ==
The games were played from 20 February to 18 April 2010.

=== Group 1 ===
Pos	Team	Pld	W	D	L	GF	GA	GD	Pts	Qualification	ÞÓR	GRI	ÍA	STJ	HAU	FYL	KFF	NJA
1	Þór A. (Q)	7	4	1	2	16	9	+7	13	Qualification to the Quarter-finals	—	—	2–0	—	—	3–3	—	5–0
2	Grindavík (Q)	7	4	1	2	13	8	+5	13	Qualification to the Quarter-finals	3–2	—	2–0	3–2	1–2	—	—	—
3	ÍA	7	4	1	2	16	14	+2	13		—	—	—	4–4	—	2–1	3–1	3–1
4	Stjarnan	7	3	1	3	17	14	+3	10		3–1	—	—	—	4–1	—	—	2–0
5	Haukar	7	3	1	3	13	14	−1	10		0–2	—	3–4	—	—	2–1	—	—
6	Fylkir	7	2	3	2	10	9	+1	9		—	0–0	—	3–1	—	—	2–1	—
7	Fjarðabyggð	7	2	0	5	9	17	−8	6		0–1	1–4	—	2–1	1–4	—	—	—
8	Njarðvík	7	1	2	4	5	14	−9	5		—	1–0	—	—	1–1	0–0	2–3	—

Source: ksi.is (in Icelandic)
Rules for classification: 1) points; 2) goal difference; 3) number of goals scored.
(Q) Qualified for the phase indicated

=== Group 2 ===
Pos	Team	Pld	W	D	L	GF	GA	GD	Pts	Qualification	FRA	FH	VAL	SEL	VÍK	FJÖ	LRE	KAK
1	Fram (Q)	7	6	1	0	16	7	+9	19	Qualification to the Quarter-finals	—	1–0	—	3–1	3–2	—	2–1	—
2	FH (Q)	7	5	1	1	20	5	+15	16	Qualification to the Quarter-finals	—	—	—	—	2–0	6–1	3–0	—
3	Valur (Q)	7	4	2	1	12	4	+8	14	Qualification to the Quarter-finals	1–1	0–3	—	3–0	4–0	—	—	—
4	Selfoss	7	4	0	3	8	12	−4	12		—	0–3	—	—	—	2–1	—	1–0
5	Víkingur Reykjavík	7	3	0	4	10	11	−1	9		—	—	—	1–2	—	3–0	1–0	3–0
6	Fjölnir	7	2	0	5	9	19	−10	6		1–2	—	0–3	—	—	—	—	2–0
7	Leiknir R.	7	1	1	5	8	14	−6	4		—	—	0–0	1–2	—	3–4	—	—
8	KA	7	0	1	6	6	17	−11	1		1–4	3–3	0–1	—	—	—	2–3	—

Source: ksi.is (in Icelandic)
Rules for classification: 1) points; 2) goal difference; 3) number of goals scored.
(Q) Qualified for the phase indicated

=== Group 3 ===
Pos	Team	Pld	W	D	L	GF	GA	GD	Pts	Qualification	KR	BRE	KEF	ÍBV	HK	ÍR	ÞRÓ	GRÓ
1	KR (Q)	7	6	0	1	27	7	+20	18	Qualification to the Quarter-finals	—	—	3–2	—	5–1	—	5–0	2–1
2	Breiðablik (Q)	7	6	0	1	13	6	+7	18	Qualification to the Quarter-finals	2–0	—	0–3	—	3–2	—	—	—
3	Keflavík (Q)	7	5	1	1	18	10	+8	16	Qualification to the Quarter-finals	—	—	—	—	5–1	5–4	4–1	3–0
4	ÍBV	7	3	2	2	9	17	−8	11		1–4	0–2	1–1	—	—	—	—	—
5	HK	7	1	3	3	9	10	−1	6		—	—	—	1–1	—	2–1	1–1	—
6	ÍR	7	2	0	5	11	26	−15	6		0–8	0–1	—	0–6	—	—	—	2–1
7	Þróttur Reykjavík	7	1	1	5	10	25	−15	4		—	1–3	—	1–6	—	3–4	—	3–2
8	Grótta	7	0	1	6	6	16	−10	1		—	0–2	—	1–3	1–1	—	—	—

Source: ksi.is (in Icelandic)
Rules for classification: 1) points; 2) goal difference; 3) number of goals scored.
(Q) Qualified for the phase indicated

== Knockout stage ==
Source: ksi.is (in Icelandic)

=== Quarter-finals ===
The games were played on 22 April 2010.

Team 1	Score	Team 2
KR Reykjavík	4–1	FH
Fram	1–1 (4–3 p)	Keflavík
Þór Akureyri	0–0 (2–4 p)	Valur
Grindavík	0–1	Breiðablik

=== Semi-finals ===
The games were played on 25 April 2010.

Team 1	Score	Team 2
Fram	2–2 (3–4 p)	Breiðablik
Valur	0–3	KR Reykjavík

=== Final ===
1 May 2010
16:00 UTC

Breiðablik	1–2	KR Reykjavík
Ársælsson 63'		Takefusa 43'; Rutgers 45'

Kórinn, Kópavogur
Referee: Þóroddur Hjaltalín Jr.
