= 2005 Icelandic Men's Football League Cup =

Deildarbikar karla

Tournament details
- Country: Iceland
- Teams: 16

Final positions
- Champions: KR
- Runners-up: Þróttur

The 2005 Icelandic Men's Football League Cup was the tenth staging of the Icelandic Men's League Cup, a pre-season professional football competition in Iceland. The competition started on 19 February 2005 and concluded on 5 May 2006 with KR beating Þróttur 3-2 in the final.

== Details ==
- The 16 teams were divided into 2 groups of 8 teams. Each team plays one match with other teams in the group once. The top 4 teams from each group qualified for the quarter-finals.

== Group stage ==
=== Group A ===
Pos	Team	Pld	W	D	L	GF	GA	GD	Pts	Qualification
1	ÍA (Q)	7	5	0	2	15	12	+3	15	Qualification to the Quarter-finals
2	Breiðablik (Q)	7	4	2	1	16	9	+7	14	Qualification to the Quarter-finals
3	Valur (Q)	7	4	2	1	17	12	+5	14	Qualification to the Quarter-finals
4	ÍBV (Q)	7	3	2	2	12	8	+4	11	Qualification to the Quarter-finals
5	Þór Akureyri	7	2	2	3	12	14	−2	8	
6	Víkingur Reykjavík	7	2	2	3	12	16	−4	8	
7	Fylkir	7	2	1	4	13	13	0	7	
8	Grindavik	7	0	1	6	6	19	−13	1	

Rules for classification: 1) points; 2) goal difference; 3) number of goals scored.
(Q) Qualified for the phase indicated

=== Group B ===
Pos	Team	Pld	W	D	L	GF	GA	GD	Pts	Qualification
1	KR (Q)	7	5	2	0	14	4	+10	17	Qualification to the Quarter-finals
2	Þróttur (Q)	7	4	1	2	15	7	+8	13	Qualification to the Quarter-finals
3	FH (Q)	7	3	2	2	11	7	+4	11	Qualification to the Quarter-finals
4	Keflavík (Q)	7	2	3	2	10	13	−3	9	Qualification to the Quarter-finals
5	KA	7	2	2	3	12	13	−1	8	
6	Fram	7	2	2	3	7	9	−2	8	
7	HK	7	2	1	4	10	17	−7	7	
8	Volsungur	7	1	1	5	3	12	−9	4	

Rules for classification: 1) points; 2) goal difference; 3) number of goals scored.
(Q) Qualified for the phase indicated

== Knockout stage ==
=== Quarter-finals ===
26 April 2005

KR	2–0	ÍBV
Larusson 42'; Hjartarson 82'

26 April 2005

Þróttur	2–1	Valur
Maruniak 57'; Einarsson 90' (pen.)		Benediktsson 34'

28 April 2005

Breiðablik	3–3 (a.e.t.)	FH
Sigurgeirsson 14' (pen.); Hreinsson 18'; Birgisson 108'		Gudmundsson 38' (pen.), 56'; Asgeirsson 93'
Penalties
	4–2

28 April 2005

ÍA	2–1	Keflavík
Bjornsson 3'; Reynisson 88' (pen.)		Gudmundsson 56'

=== Semi-finals ===
1 May 2005

ÍA	1–2 (a.e.t.)	Þróttur
Jonsson 30'		Tryggvason 14'; Eyjolfsson 118'

1 May 2005

KR	3–0	Breiðablik
Olafsson 30'; Kristjansson 68'; Astvaldsson 84'

=== Final ===
5 May 2005

KR	3–2	Þróttur
Einarsson 45'; Fridgeirsson 74'; Kristjansson 85'		Omarsson 55'; Einarsson 71' (pen.)

Egilshöll, Reykjavík
Referee: Magnus Thorisson

== See also ==
- Icelandic Men's Football Cup
- Knattspyrnusamband Íslands - The Icelandic Football Association
- Icelandic First Division League 2005
