= Bjarni Guðjónsson =

Icelandic footballer (born 1979)

Personal information
- Full name: Bjarni Eggerts Guðjónsson
- Date of birth: 26 February 1979 (age 47)
- Place of birth: Akranes, Iceland
- Height: 1.74 m (5 ft 9 in)
- Position: Midfielder

Senior career*
Years	Team	Apps	(Gls)
1995–1997	ÍA	26	(15)
1997–1998	Newcastle United	0	(0)
1998–2000	Genk	26	(0)
2000–2003	Stoke City	132	(11)
2003–2004	VfL Bochum	4	(1)
2004	→ Coventry City (loan)	18	(3)
2004	Coventry City	10	(0)
2004–2006	Plymouth Argyle	25	(1)
2006–2008	ÍA	45	(12)
2008–2013	KR	108	(9)
Total		394	(52)

International career
1994–1995	Iceland U17	16	(1)
1995–1997	Iceland U19	12	(3)
1996–2001	Iceland U21	19	(4)
1997–2010	Iceland	23	(1)

Managerial career
- 2013–2014: Fram
- 2014–2016: KR
- 2017: Víkingur R. (assistant)
- 2018–2021: KR (assistant)
- 2021-: IFK Norrköping (U19)
Medal record
ÍA
Winner	Úrvalsdeild	1995
Winner	Úrvalsdeild	1996
Winner	Icelandic Cup	1996
Winner	Icelandic League Cup	1996
Genk
Winner	Belgian First Division	1998–99
KR
Winner	Icelandic Cup	2008
Runner-up	Úrvalsdeild	2009
Runner-up	Icelandic Cup	2010
Winner	Icelandic League Cup	2010
Winner	Úrvalsdeild	2011
Winner	Icelandic Cup	2011
Winner	Icelandic Cup	2012
Winner	Icelandic League Cup	2012
- * Club domestic league appearances and goals

Bjarni Eggerts Guðjónsson (born 26 February 1979) is an Icelandic football manager and former player.

A midfielder, he played in Belgium, England and Germany and has two brothers who have also played professional football, Þórður and Jóhannes. All three played together at Genk. He is also the son of former footballer and now manager Guðjón Þórðarson.

== Club career ==
Bjarni was born in Akranes. He began his career at his hometown club ÍA, before moving to English club Newcastle United in 1997 for £500,000. He failed to break into the first team at the club and left a year later for Belgian club Genk before returning to England in 2000 with Stoke City in a £250,000 signing joining up with his father Guðjón Þórðarson who was manager. He became a regular in the first team and made 53 appearances in the 2000–01 season however he was transfer listed at the end of the season as his father felt Bjarni was struggling to deal with being the son of the manager. No transfer away from the club was forthcoming and Bjarni stayed for the 2001–02 season and this time played 54 matches as Stoke gained promotion via the play-offs. Despite gaining promotion his father was sacked by the board. Bjarni stayed at Stoke and helped the club to avoid relegation before he joined his brother Þórður Guðjónsson at VfL Bochum on a free transfer.

He struggled to cement a place in the first team at Bochum and was loaned out to Coventry City in 2004 where he excelled under the management of Eric Black. Coventry signed him on a free later that year however he struggled for game time under new manager Peter Reid and eventually fell out of favour. He was signed on a free by Plymouth Argyle who he stayed with for two years and was a popular character, scoring once against Everton in the FA Cup, before joining ÍA again in 2006. In his second spell at ÍA he stayed for two years, until he was sold to KR in 2008.

== International career ==
Bjarni made his debut for Iceland as a substitute for Helgi Sigurðsson in a friendly match against Slovakia in April 1997 and has been capped 19 more times since, scoring once against Liechtenstein in a World Cup qualifier in 1997, as well as captaining his side in a 2008 fixture.

== Career statistics ==
=== Club ===
Appearances and goals by club, season and competition
Club	Season	League			National cup		League cup		Other (Note: Appearances and goals in the Icelandic Super Cup, Football League play-offs, Football League Trophy, UEFA Champions League and UEFA Europa League)		Total	
Club	Season	Division	Apps	Goals	Apps	Goals	Apps	Goals	Apps	Goals	Apps	Goals
ÍA	1995	Úrvalsdeild	3	0	0	0	0	0	0	0	3	0
ÍA	1996	Úrvalsdeild	17	13	5	4	0	0	1	0	23	17
ÍA	1997	Úrvalsdeild	6	2	0	0	0	0	1	1	7	3
ÍA	Total		26	15	5	4	0	0	2	1	33	20
Newcastle United	1997–98	Premier League	0	0	0	0	0	0	0	0	0	0
Newcastle United	1998–99	Premier League	0	0	0	0	0	0	0	0	0	0
Newcastle United	Total		0	0	0	0	0	0	0	0	0	0
Genk	1998–99	Belgian First Division	7	0	0	0	0	0	0	0	7	0
Genk	1999–2000	Belgian First Division	19	0	0	0	0	0	0	0	19	0
Genk	Total		26	0	0	0	0	0	0	0	26	0
Stoke City	1999–2000	Second Division	8	1	0	0	0	0	5	0	13	1
Stoke City	2000–01	Second Division	42	6	2	0	5	2	5	2	54	10
Stoke City	2001–02	Second Division	46	3	4	1	1	0	3	0	54	4
Stoke City	2002–03	First Division	36	1	3	0	1	0	0	0	40	1
Stoke City	Total		132	11	9	1	7	2	13	2	161	16
VfL Bochum	2003–04	Bundesliga	4	1	1	0	1	0	0	0	6	1
Coventry City	2003–04	First Division	18	3	2	0	0	0	0	0	20	3
Coventry City	2004–05	Championship	10	0	0	0	3	0	0	0	13	0
Coventry City	Total		28	3	2	0	3	0	0	0	33	3
Plymouth Argyle	2004–05	Championship	15	0	1	1	0	0	0	0	16	1
Plymouth Argyle	2005–06	Championship	10	0	0	0	1	0	0	0	11	0
Plymouth Argyle	Total		25	0	1	1	1	0	0	0	27	1
ÍA	2006	Úrvalsdeild	17	5	2	1	4	0	2	1	25	7
ÍA	2007	Úrvalsdeild	17	7	2	0	6	1	0	0	25	8
ÍA	2008	Úrvalsdeild	11	0	1	0	7	2	1	0	20	2
ÍA	Total		45	12	5	1	17	3	3	1	70	17
KR	2008	Úrvalsdeild	7	1	2	0	0	0	0	0	9	1
KR	2009	Úrvalsdeild	21	2	4	0	4	1	5	0	33	3
KR	2010	Úrvalsdeild	20	1	5	0	7	1	4	0	36	2
KR	2011	Úrvalsdeild	21	2	4	1	8	0	4	1	37	4
KR	2012	Úrvalsdeild	21	0	5	0	6	0	3	0	34	0
KR	2013	Úrvalsdeild	18	3	2	0	7	3	4	0	30	6
KR	Total		108	9	21	1	32	5	20	1	182	16
Career total			394	51	45	8	60	10	38	5	537	70

=== International ===
Appearances and goals by national team and year
National team	Year	Apps	Goals
Iceland	1997	4	1
Iceland	1998	2	0
Iceland	1999	1	0
Iceland	2000	1	0
Iceland	2002	4	0
Iceland	2004	3	0
Iceland	2005	2	0
Iceland	2008	3	0
Iceland	2010	3	0
Total		23	1

== Honours ==
ÍA

- Úrvalsdeild: 1995, 1996
- Icelandic Cup: 1996
- Icelandic League Cup: 1996

Genk

- Belgian First Division: 1998–99

Stoke City

- Football League Second Division play-offs: 2002
- Football League Trophy: 1999–2000
