= 2003 Icelandic Men's Football League Cup =

Deildarbikar karla

Tournament details
- Country: Iceland
- Teams: 16

Final positions
- Champions: ÍA
- Runners-up: Keflavík

The 2003 Icelandic Men's Football League Cup was the eighth staging of the Icelandic Men's League Cup. It featured all the 2002 Úrvalsdeild karla teams and the top 6 teams from 1. deild karla in 2002.

The competition started on 21 February 2003 and concluded on 9 May 2003 with ÍA beating Keflavík 4-2 on penalties in the final.

== Details ==
- The 16 teams were divided into 2 groups of 8 teams. Each team plays one match with other teams in the group once. The top 4 teams from each group qualified for the quarter-finals.

== Group stage ==
=== Group A ===
Pos	Team	Pld	W	D	L	GF	GA	GD	Pts	Qualification
1	Keflavík (Q)	7	6	0	1	23	9	+14	18	Qualification to the Quarter-finals
2	ÍA (Q)	7	4	1	2	15	6	+9	13	Qualification to the Quarter-finals
3	Fram (Q)	7	4	1	2	16	10	+6	13	Qualification to the Quarter-finals
4	KR (Q)	7	4	0	3	14	8	+6	12	Qualification to the Quarter-finals
5	Þór Akureyri	7	4	0	3	16	15	+1	12	
6	Afturelding	7	3	0	4	9	20	−11	9	
7	Stjarnan	7	1	1	5	10	21	−11	4	
8	KA	7	0	1	6	4	18	−14	1	

Rules for classification: 1) points; 2) goal difference; 3) number of goals scored.
(Q) Qualified for the phase indicated

=== Group B ===
Pos	Team	Pld	W	D	L	GF	GA	GD	Pts	Qualification
1	Þróttur (Q)	7	4	1	2	23	15	+8	13	Qualification to the Quarter-finals
2	Grindavik (Q)	7	4	1	2	16	8	+8	13	Qualification to the Quarter-finals
3	ÍBV (Q)	7	4	0	3	14	6	+8	12	Qualification to the Quarter-finals
4	Fylkir (Q)	7	3	3	1	11	7	+4	12	Qualification to the Quarter-finals
5	Víkingur Reykjavík	7	3	1	3	10	14	−4	10	
6	Valur	7	3	0	4	11	12	−1	9	
7	Haukar	7	2	1	4	10	20	−10	7	
8	FH	7	1	1	5	8	21	−13	4	

Rules for classification: 1) points; 2) goal difference; 3) number of goals scored.
(Q) Qualified for the phase indicated

== Knockout stage ==
=== Quarter-finals ===
1 May 2003

Keflavík	3–1	Fylkir
Sveinsson 36'; Runarsson 56'; Runarsson 81'		Snorrason 41'

1 May 2003

Grindavik	1–0	Fram
Own goal 78'

1 May 2003

ÍA	2–0	ÍBV
Hjartarson 9' (pen.); Reynisson 72'

1 May 2003

Þróttur	5–11 (a.e.t.)	KR
Sverrisson 7'; Larusson 47', 89'; Hermansen 55', 78'		Gunnarsson 3' (pen.), 64' (pen.); Olafsson 69'; Johannsson 72', 98'; Finnbogason 84', 118'; Astvaldsson 101', 104', 116', 120'

=== Semi-finals ===
4 May 2003

KR	1–4	ÍA
Gunnlaugsson 32'		Sveinsson 3'; Reynisson 26'; Hjartarson 38'; Hjalmsson 76'

4 May 2003

Keflavík	3–1	Grindavik
Kristjansson 26'; Thorsteinsson 66', 88'		Sharpe 55'

=== Final ===
9 May 2003

ÍA	1–1 (a.e.t.)	Keflavík
Haraldsson 8'		Thorsteinsson 13'
Penalties
	4–2

Valbjarnarvöllur, Reykjavík
Referee: Olafur Ragnarsson

== See also ==
- Icelandic Men's Football Cup
- Knattspyrnusamband Íslands - The Icelandic Football Association
- Icelandic First Division League 2003
