= 2001 Icelandic Men's Football League Cup =

Deildarbikar karla

Tournament details
- Country: Iceland
- Teams: 16

Final positions
- Champions: KR
- Runners-up: FH

The 2001 Icelandic Men's Football League Cup was the sixth staging of the Icelandic Men's League Cup. It featured all the 2000 Úrvalsdeild karla teams and the top 6 teams from 1. deild karla in 2000.

The competition started on 15 February 2001 and concluded on 6 May 2001 with KR beating FH 5-3 on penalties in the final.

== Details ==
- The 16 teams were divided into 2 groups of 8 teams. Each team played one match against each of the other teams in the group. The top 4 teams from each group qualified for the quarter-finals.

== Group stage ==
=== Group A ===
Pos	Team	Pld	W	D	L	GF	GA	GD	Pts	Qualification
1	Grindavík (Q)	7	5	1	1	14	5	+9	16	Qualification to the Quarter-finals
2	ÍA (Q)	7	5	0	2	21	13	+8	15	Qualification to the Quarter-finals
3	Fram (Q)	7	4	1	2	14	10	+4	13	Qualification to the Quarter-finals
4	FH (Q)	7	3	2	2	19	9	+10	11	Qualification to the Quarter-finals
5	Fylkir	7	3	1	3	13	14	−1	10	
6	Stjarnan	7	2	1	4	15	17	−2	7	
7	Víkingur Reykjavík	7	1	2	4	15	22	−7	5	
8	Tindastóll	7	1	0	6	5	26	−21	3	

Rules for classification: 1) points; 2) goal difference; 3) number of goals scored.
(Q) Qualified for the phase indicated

=== Group B ===
Pos	Team	Pld	W	D	L	GF	GA	GD	Pts	Qualification
1	Breiðablik (Q)	7	6	1	0	24	8	+16	19	Qualification to the Quarter-finals
2	KR (Q)	7	5	0	2	16	8	+8	15	Qualification to the Quarter-finals
3	Keflavík (Q)	7	4	0	3	22	20	+2	12	Qualification to the Quarter-finals
4	ÍBV (Q)	7	3	1	3	12	11	+1	10	Qualification to the Quarter-finals
5	KA	7	2	2	3	10	10	0	8	
6	Valur	7	2	1	4	10	11	−1	7	
7	ÍR	7	2	1	4	13	22	−9	7	
8	Leiftur	7	1	0	6	7	24	−17	3	

Rules for classification: 1) points; 2) goal difference; 3) number of goals scored.
(Q) Qualified for the phase indicated

== Knockout stage ==
=== Quarter-finals ===
24 April 2001

KR	1–0	Fram
Dagnogo 64'

24 April 2001

Grindavík	4–3 (a.e.t.)	ÍBV
Floventsson 7' (pen.); Lukić 80'; Asgeirsson 98'; Kekić 117'		Ilić 51', 75'; Stefansson 108'

25 April 2001

Breiðablik	0–2	FH
		Bjornsson 5', 58'

26 April 2001

ÍA	1–0	Keflavík
Gislason 49'

=== Semi-finals ===
1 May 2001

FH	5–2 (a.e.t.)	ÍA
Magnusson 82'; Magnusson 89'; Stefansson 93'; Bjornsson 109'; Jakobsson 115'		Hinriksson 26'; Reynisson 45'

1 May 2001

Grindavík	1–2	KR
Floventsson 22' (pen.)		Brekkan 17'; Own goal 72'

=== Final ===
5 May 2001

FH	0–0 (a.e.t.)	KR
Penalties
	3–5

Laugardalsvöllur, Reykjavík
Referee: Garðar Örn Hinriksson

== See also ==
- Icelandic Men's Football Cup
- Knattspyrnusamband Íslands - The Icelandic Football Association
- Icelandic First Division League 2001
