= 2004 Icelandic Men's Football League Cup =

Deildarbikar karla

Tournament details
- Country: Iceland
- Teams: 16

Final positions
- Champions: FH
- Runners-up: KR

The 2004 Icelandic Men's Football League Cup was the ninth staging of the Icelandic Men's League Cup. It featured all the 2003 Úrvalsdeild karla teams and the top 6 teams from 1. deild karla in 2003.

The competition started on 20 February 2004 and concluded on 8 May 2004 with FH beating KR 2-1 in the final.

== Details ==
- The 16 teams were divided into 2 groups of 8 teams. Each team plays one match with other teams in the group once. The top 4 teams from each group qualified for the quarter-finals.

== Group stage ==
=== Group A ===
Pos	Team	Pld	W	D	L	GF	GA	GD	Pts	Qualification
1	KA (Q)	7	5	1	1	17	5	+12	16	Qualification to the Quarter-finals
2	KR (Q)	7	5	1	1	19	9	+10	16	Qualification to the Quarter-finals
3	Fylkir (Q)	7	5	0	2	17	11	+6	15	Qualification to the Quarter-finals
4	Víkingur Reykjavík (Q)	7	3	2	2	12	8	+4	11	Qualification to the Quarter-finals
5	Þór Akureyri	7	3	0	4	8	14	−6	9	
6	UMF Grindavik	7	3	0	4	11	19	−8	9	
7	Haukar	7	1	0	6	13	21	−8	3	
8	Njarðvík	7	1	0	6	9	19	−10	3	

Rules for classification: 1) points; 2) goal difference; 3) number of goals scored.
(Q) Qualified for the phase indicated

=== Group B ===
Pos	Team	Pld	W	D	L	GF	GA	GD	Pts	Qualification
1	Keflavík (Q)	7	5	2	0	23	11	+12	17	Qualification to the Quarter-finals
2	ÍA (Q)	7	5	1	1	17	10	+7	16	Qualification to the Quarter-finals
3	Valur (Q)	7	4	0	3	14	9	+5	12	Qualification to the Quarter-finals
4	FH (Q)	7	4	0	3	17	15	+2	12	Qualification to the Quarter-finals
5	Þróttur	7	3	1	3	13	12	+1	10	
6	Fram	7	2	2	3	15	13	+2	8	
7	ÍBV	7	1	2	4	15	16	−1	5	
8	Stjarnan	7	0	0	7	5	33	−28	0	

Rules for classification: 1) points; 2) goal difference; 3) number of goals scored.
(Q) Qualified for the phase indicated

== Knockout stage ==
=== Quarter-finals ===
28 April 2004

FH	4–3	KA
Gardarsson 23'; Bjornsson 67'; Gardarsson 69'; Leosson 73'		Thorhallsson 11'; Martin 78'; Hringsson 82'

28 April 2004

ÍA	2–1	Fylkir
Gunnlaugsson 50', 52'		Juliusson 88'

29 April 2004

Keflavík	0–0 (a.e.t.)	Víkingur Reykjavík
Penalties
	3–5

30 April 2004

KR	4–0	Valur
Gunnlaugsson 23'; Haflidason 67' (pen.); Sigurgeirsson 72'; Finnbogason 74'

=== Semi-finals ===
2 May 2004

FH	2–0	ÍA
Bjornsson 27', 60'

3 May 2004

KR	1–0	Víkingur Reykjavík
Thorsteinsson 66'

=== Final ===
5 May 2004

FH	2–1	KR
Bjornsson 23'; Finnbogason 75' (o.g.)		Finnbogason 35'

Kaplakriki, Hafnarfjörður
Attendance: 1,200
Referee: Erlendur Magnusson

== See also ==
- Icelandic Men's Football Cup
- Knattspyrnusamband Íslands - The Icelandic Football Association
- Icelandic First Division League 2004
