= David Winnie =

Scottish footballer and manager

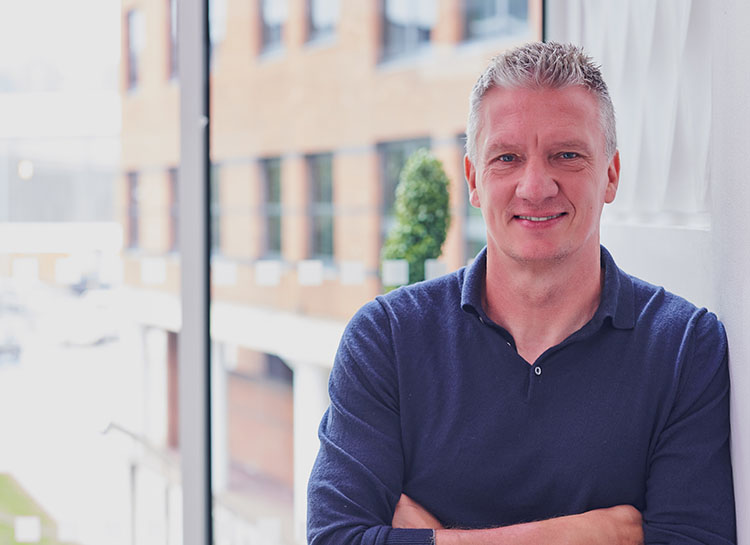
- David Winnie in 2021

Personal information
- Full name: David Peter Winnie
- Date of birth: 26 October 1966 (age 60)
- Place of birth: Glasgow, Scotland
- Height: 6 ft 1 in (1.85 m)
- Position: Defender

Senior career*
Years	Team	Apps	(Gls)
1983–1991	St Mirren	146	(6)
1991–1995	Aberdeen	63	(1)
1994	→ Middlesbrough (loan)	1	(0)
1995–1996	Heart of Midlothian	6	(0)
1996–1997	Dundee	26	(1)
1997–1998	St Mirren	22	(0)
1998	KR Reykjavík	13	(1)
1998–1999	Ayr United	13	(0)
1999	Canberra Cosmos	23	(1)
1999–2000	KR Reykjavík	24	(1)
Total		337	(10)

International career
1987	Scotland U21	1	(0)

Managerial career
- 2001: KR Reykjavík
- 2002–2003: Dumbarton
- * Club domestic league appearances and goals

David Peter Winnie (born 26 October 1966) is a Scottish former football player and manager of Dumbarton. He is presently a Partner in a law firm based in central London.

== Playing career ==
A defender on the field, Winnie was part of St Mirren's 1987 Scottish Cup final-winning team. He also played for Aberdeen, Dundee and Hearts, and was a Scotland U21 international. After leaving Scotland in 1998, he played for KR Reykjavik where he won the Icelandic player of the year. In 1999, Winnie helped KR win the Icelandic Premier League and Cup for the first time in 30 years, following which he went on loan to Canberra Cosmos in Australia for a season before returning to Iceland.

== Coaching and managerial career ==
In 2001, Winnie was then assistant manager at KR before a brief caretaker role saw him steer them from relegation danger. Winnie was then part of the youth academy coaching staff at Livingston and Rangers.

Winnie was manager of Dumbarton from June 2002 until his sacking in March 2003, when the Sons were struggling in the Second Division. He was replaced by Bo'ness United manager Brian Fairley.

== Legal career ==
Winnie trained to become a solicitor at a law firm in St. Albans and qualified in November 2009. He is presently a partner and Head of Sports at Gilson Gray LLP, a Scottish law firm with offices throughout the United Kingdom. Winnie was on the disciplinary panel that considered the "Spygate" case, which resulted in Southampton being expelled from the 2026 EFL play-offs.

== Manager statistics ==
As of March 2003

Team	Nat	From	To	Record				
Team	Nat	From	To	G	W	D	L	Win %
Dumbarton	(Scotland)	June 2002	March 2003	34	11	6	17	32.35

== Football honours ==
St Mirren

- Scottish Cup: 1986–87
- Renfrewshire Cup: 1984–85

Aberdeen

- Scottish Premier League
  - runners up: 1992–93
- Scottish Cup
  - runners-up: 1992–93
- Scottish League Cup
  - runners up: 1992–93

KR Reykjavík

- Icelandic League: 1999, 2000
  - runners-up: 1998
- Icelandic Cup: 1999
- Icelandic League Cups: 1998 2001
