= 1996 Úrvalsdeild =

Úrvalsdeild
- Season: 1996

Statistics of Úrvalsdeild in the 1996 season.

== Overview ==
It was contested by 10 teams, and ÍA won the championship. KR's Ríkharður Daðason was the top scorer with 14 goals.

== Final league table ==
Pos	Team	Pld	W	D	L	GF	GA	GD	Pts	Qualification or relegation
1	ÍA (C)	18	13	1	4	46	19	+27	40	Qualification for the Champions League first qualifying round
2	KR	18	11	4	3	38	16	+22	37	Qualification for the UEFA Cup first qualifying round
3	Leiftur	18	8	5	5	33	28	+5	29	Qualification for the Intertoto Cup group stage
4	ÍBV	18	8	1	9	30	33	−3	25	Qualification for the Cup Winners' Cup qualifying round
5	Valur	18	7	3	8	23	25	−2	24	
6	Stjarnan	18	6	5	7	25	32	−7	23	
7	Grindavík	18	5	4	9	23	34	−11	19	
8	Keflavík	18	4	7	7	16	28	−12	19	
9	Fylkir (R)	18	5	3	10	26	30	−4	18	Relegation to 1. deild karla
10	Breiðablik (R)	18	3	7	8	19	34	−15	16	Relegation to 1. deild karla

Source: RSSSF
Rules for classification: 1) points; 2) goal difference; 3) number of goals scored.
(C) Champions; (R) Relegated

== Results ==
Each team played every opponent once home and away for a total of 18 matches.

Home \ Away	BRE	FYL	GRI	ÍA	ÍBV	ÍBK	KR	LEI	STJ	VAL
Breiðablik		1–6	0–0	0–4	2–3	1–1	1–0	1–1	3–0	1–1
Fylkir	1–0		1–2	0–2	2–3	1–0	0–2	3–2	0–0	0–1
Grindavík	0–0	2–4		0–2	3–2	4–0	0–2	2–2	0–3	2–0
ÍA	0–1	3–2	6–3		2–1	5–0	4–1	0–0	3–1	2–1
ÍBV	4–2	3–2	2–1	3–2		1–1	0–4	1–3	1–2	1–0
Keflavík	1–1	0–0	2–1	0–3	1–0		2–2	1–1	0–1	2–1
KR	5–2	1–1	4–0	1–0	1–0	1–1		2–1	1–1	3–0
Leiftur	3–1	2–1	0–1	4–3	1–4	1–2	2–1		5–3	0–0
Stjarnan	3–3	1–0	2–2	0–2	1–0	2–1	1–4	2–3		2–4
Valur	2–0	5–2	2–0	1–3	3–1	2–1	0–3	0–2	0–0	

Source: RSSSF
Legend: Blue = home team win; Yellow = draw; Red = away team win.

== Top goalscorers ==
Rank	Player	Club	Goals
1	(Iceland) Rikhardur Dadason	KR	14
2	(Iceland) Bjarni Guðjónsson	ÍA	13
3	(Iceland) Guðmundur Benediktsson	KR	9
3	(Iceland) Haraldur Ingólfsson	ÍA	9
5	(Iceland) Tryggvi Guðmundsson	ÍBV	8
6	(Iceland) Kristinn Tómasson	Fylkir	7
6	(Federal Republic of Yugoslavia) Mihajlo Biberčić	ÍA	7
8	(Iceland) Baldur Bjarnason	Stjarnan	6
8	(Iceland) Þórhallur Dan Jóhannsson	Fylkir	6
8	(Slovakia) Rastislav Lazorík	Leiftur	6
8	(Iceland) Sverrir Sverrisson	Leiftur	6
8	(Iceland) Salih Porca	Valur	6

Source: RSSSF
