= Andi Hoti (footballer, born December 2003) =

Icelandic footballer

Personal information
- Full name: Andi Hoti
- Date of birth: 22 December 2003 (age 22)
- Place of birth: Iceland
- Position: Midfielder

Team information
- Current team: Afturelding (on loan from Valur)
- Number: 33

Youth career
- Leiknir Reykjavík

Senior career*
Years	Team	Apps	(Gls)
2018–2022	Leiknir Reykjavík	1	(0)
2021	→ Knattspyrnufélagið Þróttur (loan)	15	(0)
2022–2023	Afturelding	22	(2)
2023–2025	Leiknir Reykjavík	41	(1)
2025–	Valur	10	(0)
2026–	→ Afturelding (Loan)	21	(2)

International career
2021–2022	Iceland U-19	7	(0)
2023	Iceland U-21	2	(0)
- * Club domestic league appearances and goals as of 12 September 2026

Andi Hoti (born 22 December 2003) is an Icelandic football defender, who currently plays for Afturelding on loan from Valur.

== International career ==
Hoti has been involved with the U-19 and U-21 teams of Iceland, he is eligible to play for both Iceland and Albania, due to his Albanian ancestry.

== Honours ==
Valur

- Icelandic League Cup: 2025
