= Pétur Arnþórsson =

Icelandic footballer

Personal information
- Full name: Pétur Wilhelm Arnþórsson
- Date of birth: 8 May 1965 (age 61)
- Position: Midfielder

Senior career*
Years	Team	Apps	(Gls)
1981–1985	Þróttur		
1986	Viking	12	(0)
1987–1993	Fram		
1994–1996	Leiknir		
1997–1998	Fram		

International career
1984–1990	Iceland	15	(1)
- * Club domestic league appearances and goals

Pétur Arnþórsson (born 8 May 1965) is a retired Icelandic football midfielder.
