= Körfuknattleiksdeild Keflavíkur =

Körfuknattleiksdeild Keflavíkur (roughly translating to "Keflavík Basketball Club") is Keflavík ÍF's basketball subdivision and can refer to:

- Keflavík men's basketball
- Keflavík women's basketball
