= Baldur Þór Bjarnason =

Icelandic footballer

Personal information
- Full name: Baldur Þór Bjarnason
- Date of birth: 3 July 1969 (age 57)
- Place of birth: Iceland
- Position: Defender

Senior career*
Years	Team	Apps	(Gls)
1986–1989	Fylkir	63	(19)
1990–1992	Fram	43	(6)
1992–1993	Fylkir	22	(4)
1994–1997	Stjarnan	64	(12)
1998	Fram	18	(3)
2000–2002	Stjarnan	2	(0)
2003–2004	Fram	20	(2)

International career
1988–1989	Iceland U21	7	(4)
1991–1993	Iceland	11	(0)
- * Club domestic league appearances and goals

Baldur Þór Bjarnason (born 3 July 1969) is an Icelandic former footballer who played as a forward. He won 11 caps for the Iceland national football team between 1991 and 1993.
