= Kjartan Einarsson =

Icelandic footballer

Personal information
- Full name: Kjartan Jóhannes Einarsson
- Date of birth: 15 June 1968 (age 58)
- Position: Forward

Senior career*
Years	Team	Apps	(Gls)
1985–1986	ÍB Keflavík		
1987	Reynir Sandgerði		
1988–1989	ÍB Keflavík		
1990	KA		
1991–1995	Keflavík ÍF		
1996–2003	Breiðablik		

International career
- Iceland U21
1990–1991	Iceland	3	(1)
- * Club domestic league appearances and goals

Kjartan Einarsson (born 15 June 1968) is a retired Icelandic football striker.
