= Þórhallur Dan Jóhannsson =

Icelandic footballer

Personal information
- Date of birth: 5 December 1972 (age 53)
- Position: Defender

Senior career*
Years	Team	Apps	(Gls)
1989–1996	Fylkir		
1997	KR		
1997–1999	Vejle BK		
1999–2004	Fylkir		
2005–2006	Fram		
2006	Fylkir		
2006–2010	Haukar		
2011	UMF Álftanes		

International career
1996, 2002	Iceland	2	(0)
- * Club domestic league appearances and goals

Þórhallur Dan Jóhannsson (born 5 December 1972) is an Icelandic former footballer who played as a defender.
