= Icelandic Men's Football League Cup =

- Founded: 1996
- Region: Iceland
- Teams: 24
- Current champions: Valur (5th title)
- Most championships: KR (8 titles)
- 2025

The Icelandic Men's Football League Cup (Icelandic: Deildarbikar karla), also known as the Lengjubikar karla for sponsorship reasons, is a pre-season professional football competition in Iceland. It is considered the third most important competition in Icelandic football.

The pre-season tournament involves the top 22 clubs in Iceland from the previous season and the two clubs promoted from 2. deild, for a total of the 24 teams that will comprise the top two divisions in Iceland the following season. It generally takes place between February and May. The number of teams in the 2008 edition rose from 16 to 24.

== Format ==
The 24 teams are divided into four pools of six teams. Each team meets each other once during the pool stage. The final positions of the group are determined after these 5 games are played. The top two of each group automatically gain entry to the next stage in the competition.

From the quarter final round it is a purely knockout competition where ties take place over 1-leg only. If a tie is not decided in 90 minutes, penalty kicks are taken to decide the game.

Since 2001, two other pre-season tournaments have been arranged in the same format for teams lower down in the Icelandic football league ladder.

== Finals ==
| Year | Winner | Score | Runner-up |
|---|---|---|---|
| 1996 | ÍA | 3–1 (aet) | Breiðablik |
| 1997 | ÍBV | 3–2 (aet) | Valur |
| 1998 | KR | 2–2 (6–5p) | Valur |
| 1999 | ÍA | 1–0 | Fylkir |
| 2000 | Grindavík | 4–0 | Valur |
| 2001 | KR | 0–0 (5–3p) | FH |
| 2002 | FH | 2–2 (4–3p) | Fylkir |
| 2003 | ÍA | 1–1 (4–2p) | Keflavik |
| 2004 | FH | 2–1 | KR |
| 2005 | KR | 3–2 | Þróttur |
| 2006 | FH | 3–2 | Keflavik |
| 2007 | FH | 3–2 (aet) | Valur |
| 2008 | Valur | 4–1 | Fram |
| 2009 | FH | 3–0 | Breiðablik |
| 2010 | KR | 2–1 | Breiðablik |
| 2011 | Valur | 3–1 (aet) | Fylkir |
| 2012 | KR | 1–0 | Fram |
| 2013 | Breiðablik | 3–2 | Valur |
| 2014 | FH | 4–1 | Breiðablik |
| 2015 | Breiðablik | 1−0 | KA |
| 2016 | KR | 2−0 | Víkingur R. |
| 2017 | KR | 4–0 | Grindavík |
| 2018 | Valur | 4–2 | Grindavík |
| 2019 | KR | 2–1 | ÍA |
| 2020 | Cancelled due to COVID-19 pandemic | | |
| 2021 | Cancelled due to COVID-19 pandemic | | |
| 2022 | FH | 2–1 | Víkingur R. |
| 2023 | Valur | 1–1 (4-3 p) | KA |
| 2024 | Breiðablik | 4–1 | ÍA |
| 2025 | Valur | 3–2 | Fylkir |

== Performance by club ==
| Club | Titles | Runners-up | Winning Year(s) |
|---|---|---|---|
| KR | 8 | 1 | 1998, 2001, 2005, 2010, 2012, 2016, 2017, 2019 |
| FH | 7 | 1 | 2002, 2004, 2006, 2007, 2009, 2014, 2022 |
| Valur | 5 | 5 | 2008, 2011, 2018, 2023, 2025 |
| Breiðablik | 3 | 4 | 2013, 2015, 2024 |
| ÍA | 3 | 2 | 1996, 1999, 2003 |
| Grindavík | 1 | 2 | 2000 |
| ÍBV | 1 | 0 | 1997 |
| Fylkir | 0 | 4 | — |
| Keflavík | 0 | 2 | — |
| Fram | 0 | 2 | — |
| Víkingur R. | 0 | 2 | — |
| KA | 0 | 2 | — |
| Þróttur | 0 | 1 | — |
