= Leiknir Reykjavík =

Leiknir R.
- Full name: Leiknir Reykjavík
- Nickname: Ljónin (The Lions)
- Short name: LEI
- Founded: 17 May 1973; 53 years ago
- Ground: Leiknisvöllur, Reykjavík
- Capacity: 1,215
- Chairman: Oscar Clausen
- Manager: Ólafur Hrannar Kristjánsson
- League: 1. deild karla
- 2025: 1. deild karla, 9th of 12
- Website: https://www.leiknir.com/
| Home colours | Away colours |

Íþróttafélagið Leiknir (Icelandic pronunciation: [ˈiːˌθrouhtaˌfjɛːˌlaijɪð ˈleiknɪr̥], lit. 'Leiknir Sports Club' (Note: Íþróttafélagið is the definite form of Íþróttafélag, meaning "the sports club".)), commonly known as Leiknir Reykjavík (Icelandic pronunciation: [ˈleiknɪr̥ ˈreiːcaˌviːk]), is an Icelandic multi-sport club. It is best known for its men's football section, but also fields departments in Badminton, Basketball, Volleyball and Karate. The club was founded in 1973 and is based in Breiðholt neighbourhood of Reykjavík.

Leiknir plays its home matches at Leiknisvöllur, which has a capacity of 1,215 of which 525 seating

The club's motto is "Pride of Breiðholt".

== Facilities ==
The team entrance to Leiknisvöllur, the home field of Leiknir Reykjavik.

The whole Leiknir area is newly renovated and is in excellent condition. In 2008 the club opened its new facilities which replaced the old cabin that had served as the club's office and dressing facility since 1987. The current facilities are a 700 sq m club house, artificial turf with heat, main stadium and total of 4 practice grounds. One practice ground is called Þorsteins-völlur, named on 7 September 2012 in memory of 9-year-old Þorsteinn Björnsson, a former player of the youth department in Leiknir.

The club has access to a swimming pool and a gymnasium located next to the Leiknir area.

== Men's football ==
A view across the pitch during a home match for Leiknir Reykjavik vs. Grotta

=== Seasons ===
Leiknir currently plays in 1. deild karla, the second tier of Icelandic football. In 2014 the men's football team placed 1st in the 1. deild karla and won a promotion to the Úrvalsdeild, for the first time in the clubs history, however after just one season they were relegated to back to the first division. In 2021 they returned to the top flight having finished second in the 2020 season and this time they managed to finish 8th. In 2022 they finished above the relegation spots in the regular season but were relegated after the playoffs.

=== Support ===
The organized supporters of Leiknir are known as Leiknisljónin, translated in English as the Leiknir's Lions. Founded in 2015 they have been the main supporter group of Leiknir. In 2022, Leiknir got its second unofficial faction, a youth faction called Ghetto Boys. The club's anthem is In the Ghetto made famous by Elvis Presley and is played before every home game.

=== Rivalry ===
Leiknir's main rivals are their neighbours ÍR. Leiknir and ÍR are the only football clubs in Breiðholt and they represent two very different areas of the neighbourhood. The match between these two is known as Breiðholtsslagurinn. Those games tend to be very interesting. The club's record against ÍR in more recent times is very favorable.

=== Youth academy ===
The club runs a youth setup in its district for children aged 6–18. The club is renowned for playing many homegrown players and developing young players. Some of the most noticeable home-grown players are Rúnar Kristinsson, Hannes Þór Halldórsson, Hilmar Árni Halldórsson, Sævar Atli Magnússon, Vuk Oskar Dimitrevic, Andi Hoti Shkelzen Veseli and Júlíus Magnússon

=== Honours ===
==== League ====
- 1. deild karla (1st Division)
  - Winners (1): 2014
  - Runners-up (1): 2020
- 2. deild karla (2nd Division)
  - Winners (1): 2005
- 3. deild karla (3rd Division)
  - Runners-up (1): 2003

==== Cups ====
- Reykjavíkurmótið (Reykjavik Cup)
  - Winners (2): 2013 2016
  - Runners up (1): 2015
- Deildarbikarkeppni KSÍ – B deild (League Cup – B division)
  - Winners (1): 2005

=== Players ===
==== Current squad ====
As of 10 August 2026

Note: Flags indicate national team as defined under FIFA eligibility rules; some limited exceptions apply. Players may hold more than one non-FIFA nationality.

| No. | Pos. | Nation | Player |
|---|---|---|---|
| 1 | GK | ISL | Ólafur Íshólm Ólafsson |
| 3 | DF | ISL | Bogdan Bogdanović |
| 4 | DF | RSA | Marko Veselinović |
| 5 | MF | ISL | Daði Bærings Halldórsson (captain) |
| 6 | MF | ISL | Árni Elvar Árnason |
| 7 | MF | ISL | Birnir Breki Burknason (on loan from ÍA) |
| 8 | MF | ISL | Gísli Alexander Ágústsson |
| 9 | FW | ISL | Jóhann Kanfory Tjörvason |
| 12 | GK | POL | Jakub Górski |
| 15 | DF | ISL | Rúrik Gunnarsson |
| 16 | MF | ISL | Viktor Andri Pétursson |
| 17 | DF | ISL | Adam Örn Arnarson |
| 19 | FW | ISL | Axel Freyr Harðarson |

| No. | Pos. | Nation | Player |
|---|---|---|---|
| 20 | FW | ISL | Dagur Ingi Hammer Gunnarsson |
| 21 | MF | ISL | Egill Ingi Benediktsson |
| 22 | MF | ISL | Þorsteinn Emil Jónsson |
| 29 | DF | ISL | Guðjón Pétur Stefánsson |
| 30 | FW | ISL | Axel Örn Kjartansson |
| 32 | DF | ISL | Eiríkur Örn Beck |
| 33 | DF | ISL | Arnór Valur Ágústsson (on loan from ÍA) |
| 43 | MF | ISL | Kári Steinn Hlífarsson |
| 45 | DF | SRB | Đorđe Vladisavljević |
| 50 | DF | ISL | Alexander Rúnar Róbertsson |
| 55 | DF | ISL | Anton Fannar Kjartansson |
| 80 | MF | ISL | Karan Gurung |

=== Managerial history ===
| Name | Nationality | Years |
|---|---|---|
| Pétur Arnþórsson | (Iceland) | 1994–1996 |
| Magnús Pálsson | (Iceland) | 1996–1997 |
| Jóhann Gunnarsson | (Iceland) | 1999–2000 |
| Magnús Einarsson | (Iceland) | 2001–2003 |
| Garðar Ásgeirsson | (Iceland) | 2004–2006 |
| Óli Halldór Sigurjónsson | (Iceland) | 2006–2007 |
| Jesper Tollefsen | (Denmark) | 2007 |
| Garðar Ásgeirsson | (Iceland) | 2007–08 |
| Sigursteinn Gíslason | (Iceland) | 2008–2011 |
| Zoran Miljković | (Serbia) | 2011 |
| Willum Þór Þórsson | (Iceland) | 2011–2012 |
| Davíð Snorri Jónasson and Freyr Alexandersson | (Iceland) (Iceland) | 2012–2015 |
| Kristján Guðmundsson | (Iceland) | 2015–2016 |
| Kristófer Sigurgeirsson | (Iceland) | 2016–2018 |
| Stefán Gíslason | (Iceland) | 2019 |
| Sigurður Heiðar Höskuldsson | (Iceland) | 2019–2022 |
| Vigfús Arnar Jósefsson | (Iceland) | 2023–2024 |
| Ólafur Hrannar Kristjánsson | (Iceland) | 2024– |

== Backroom staff ==
=== Club officials ===
| Position | Staff |
|---|---|
| Chairman | Oscar Clausen |
| Director | Geir Þorsteinsson |
| Board of Directors | Aron Fuego Daníelsson; Brynjar Hlöðvers; Elvar Geir Magnússon; Eyjólfur Tómasson |

Source: Leiknir | Stjórn Leiknis

== Basketball ==
Leiknir's basketball department was founded in 1992. In October 2021, Brynjar Karl Sigurðsson was announced as the new chairman of Leiknir's basketball department.

=== Men's basketball ===
==== Titles ====
- 2. deild karla:
  - Winners (1): 2016
  - Runner up (1): 1993, 2010

=== Women's basketball ===
==== History ====
In March 2022, the team started a collaboration with Aþena basketball club to field a team in the women's second-tier 1. deild kvenna.
