= Íþróttafélag Reykjavíkur =

Icelandic sports club

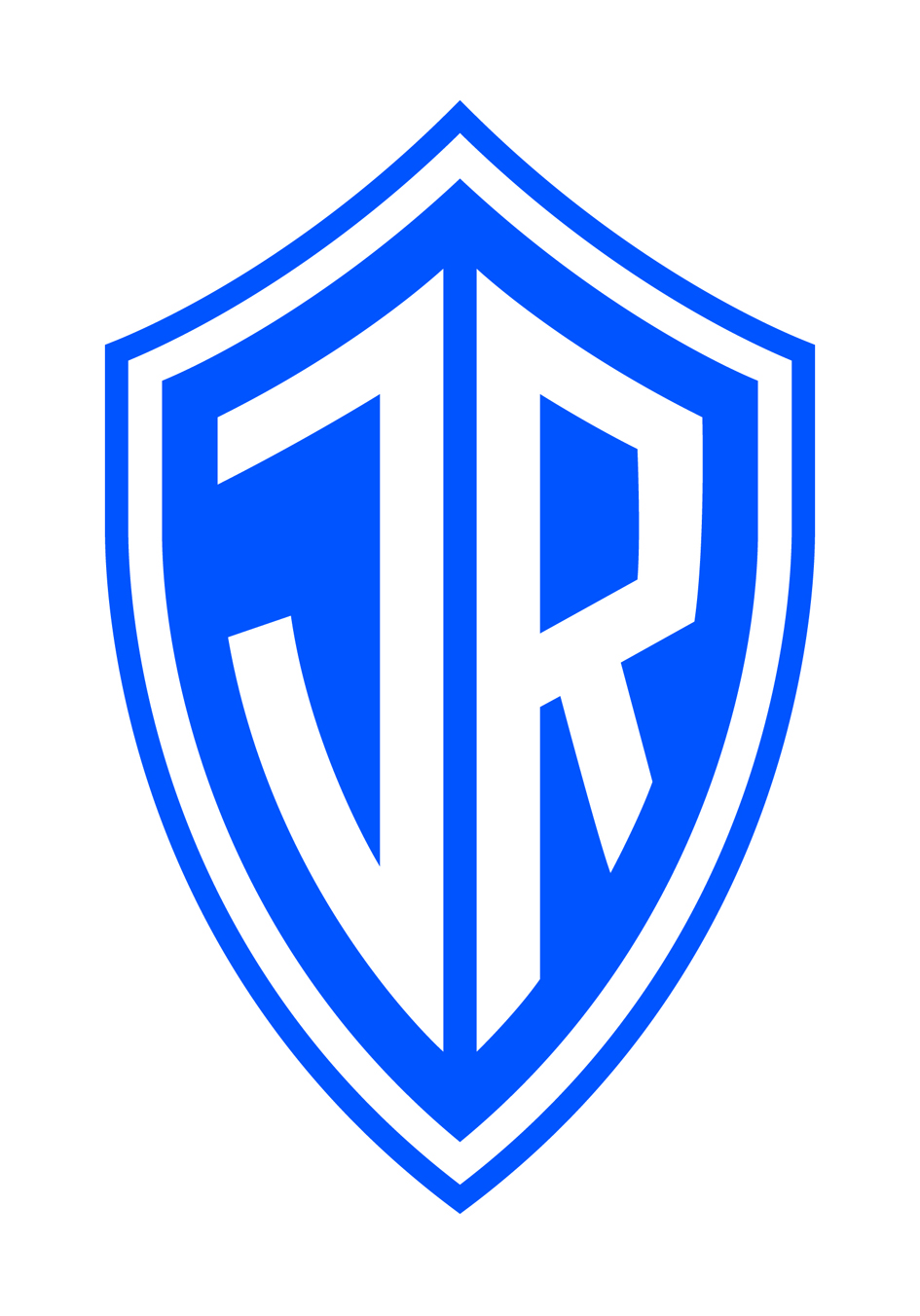
- Sports: Basketball; Bowling; Football; Gymnastics; Handball; Judo; KarateSkiing; Taekwondo; Track and field
- Founded: 11 March 1907; 119 years ago
- Location: Reykjavík, Iceland
- Colors: Blue, white
- Website: ÍRis

Íþróttafélag Reykjavíkur (Icelandic pronunciation: [ˈiːˌθrouhtaˌfjɛːˌlaːɣ ˈreiːcaˌviːkʏr̥], lit. 'Reykjavik Sports Club'), commonly known as ÍR, is an Icelandic multi-sport club, based in the suburb of Breiðholt in Reykjavík. It has teams in football, handball, basketball, athletics, tenpin bowling, skiing, karate, taekwondo and judo.

== Athletics ==
=== Notable athletes ===
- Aníta Hinriksdóttir Iceland national record holder in the women's 800 meters and 2000 meters steeplechase. In 2013, Aníta won the 800 meters at the World Youth Championships in athletics and the European Junior Championships in athletics.
- Finnbjörn Þorvaldsson - A multi-sport athlete who competed in sprinting in the 1948 Summer Olympics.
- Vala Flosadóttir - Former women's pole vault indoor world record holder and third place at the Sydney Olympic games 2000.
- Vilhjálmur Einarsson - Iceland national record holder in the men's triple jump and silver medalist at the Melbourne Olympic games 1956.
- Eiður Smári Guðjohnsen - Record goalscorer for the Icelandic national football team played in the ÍR youth teams.

== Basketball ==
=== Men's basketball ===
The ÍR men's basketball team has won the third most Icelandic championships, after KR and Njarðvík, with 15 titles.

=== Women's basketball ===
ÍR was one of the pioneers of women's basketball in Iceland and one of the founding members of the women's top-tier league. It is also one of the most successful women's teams in the country, winning a total of 11 national championships. After not fielding a team since being relegated from the Úrvalsdeild in 2004, the team was revived in 2017 and registered into Division I for the 2017–2018 season.

== Football ==
=== Men's football ===
Although football was one of the first sports practiced at Íþróttafélag Reykjavíkur, it's football department was not formally founded until 7 March 1939.

=== Women's football ===
==== Trophies ====
- 1. deild kvenna:
  - 2008

== Handball ==
=== Men's handball ===
==== Trophies ====
- Úrvalsdeild karla:
  - 1946
- Icelandic Cup:
  - 2005, 2013

=== Women's handball ===
==== Trophies ====
- Icelandic Cup:
  - 1983
