= Breiðablik (sports club) =

Sports club in Iceland

- Crest of Breiðablik
- Nickname: Blikar
- Sports: Basketball; Chess; Cycling; E-Sports; Football; Power lifting; Running; Skiing; Swimming; Taekwondo; Track and field; Triathlon
- Chairman: Ásgeir Baldurs
- Website: www.breidablik.is

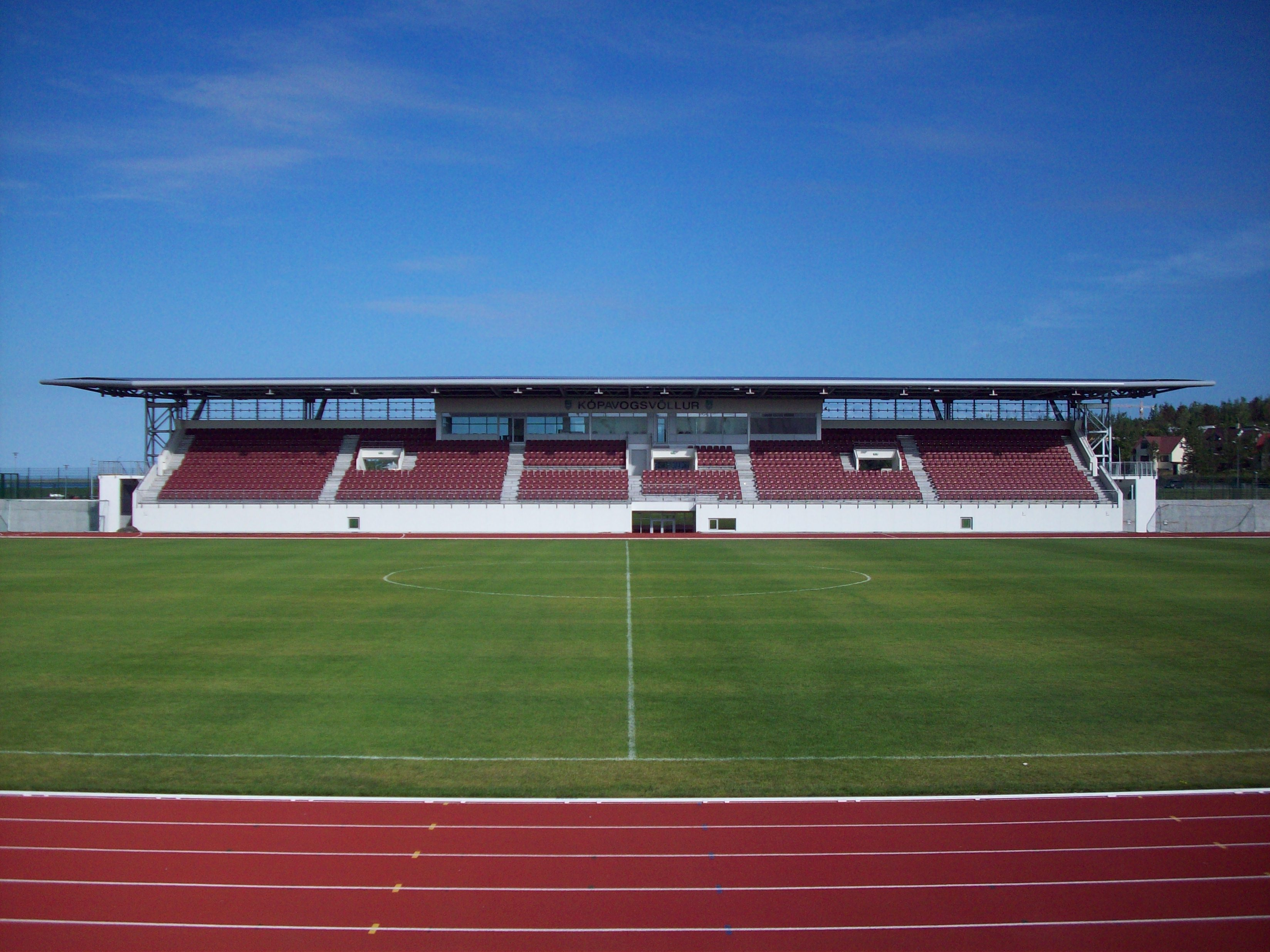
Kópavogsvöllur

Breiðablik is a multi-sports club from Kópavogur, Iceland. The club was founded in 1950 and is the largest sports club in the country. Breiðablik has several sports divisions, both men's and women's, including football, athletics, basketball, karate, dance, skiing and swimming.

== Name ==
The name Breiðablik comes from Norse mythology, where it was the home of Baldur. The nickname Blikar is formed from the second part of that name, meaning splendours or twinkles (like a star). The singular form Bliki is also a name for male ducks.

== Basketball ==
=== Men's basketball ===
As of 2018–2019 season, Breiðablik men's basketball team plays in the top-tier Úrvalsdeild karla

=== Women's basketball ===
Breiðablik women's basketball team won its lone national championship during its first season in the top-tier league in 1995. As of the 2018–2019 season, plays in Úrvalsdeild kvenna.

== Football ==
=== Men's team ===
Breiðablik's men's team first competitive match was played on 12 June 1957, a 1–0 loss against Þróttur Reykjavík. After several years in the lower leagues, Breiðablik reached the top-flight for the first time in 1971.

In recent years, the Breiðablik men's team has established itself as a powerhouse in the Icelandic league, challenging other teams regularly on all fronts. Throughout its history, the team has, however, been notorious for bouncing between the two top leagues in Iceland, getting promoted and relegated regularly. Since being promoted in 2005, and under the guidance of coach Ólafur Kristjánsson since 2006, the team has grown steadily and established itself as a real challenger in the Icelandic top-flight. The team's first big trophy came with a win in the Icelandic Cup in 2009, followed by the team's first Úrvalsdeild title in the 2010. The 2013 season is Breiðablik's 8th consecutive season in the top-flight, a club record. Breiðablik competed in a European competition for the first time in 2010, facing Scottish Premier League side Motherwell in the Europa League. They lost the first leg 1–0 in Scotland, and lost by the same scoreline in the return leg, meaning that the team lost 2–0 on aggregate. A year later, Breiðablik faced Rosenborg in the UEFA Champions League qualifiers, losing out 2–5 on aggregate. The team won away from home in Europe for the first time with a memorable 1–0 victory over Austrian side SK Sturm Graz in the 2013–14 competition.

=== Women's team ===
Breiðablik women's football team currently plays in the Úrvalsdeild kvenna, the top-tier women's football league in Iceland, where they finished second in 2017. They have won the national championship sixteen times and the Women's Cup eleven times in its history. They reached the quarter-finals of the UEFA Women's Cup in 2006-07 which is a joint record in UEFA competitions by any Icelandic team, also achieved by Valur women's team in 2005-06.
