= Grindavík (men's football) =

- Full name: Ungmennafélag Grindavíkur
- Nickname: Grindvíkingar
- Founded: 1935; 91 years ago
- Ground: Grindavíkurvöllur, Grindavík, Iceland
- Capacity: 1,750
- Chairman: Haukur Guðberg Einarsson
- Manager: Ray Jónsson
- League: 1. deild karla
- 2025: 1. deild karla, 10th of 12
- Website: http://www.umfg.is/
Home colours	Away colours

The Grindavík men's football team is the men's football department of the Ungmennafélag Grindavíkur multi-sport club. It is based in Grindavík in south-west Iceland, and currently plays in the Lengjudeildin, the second tier in Icelandic football.

== History ==
The club won its way slowly up the leagues, beginning in the third tier and spending some time there before promotion to the second tier and at last promotion to the first tier in 1994. The club established itself there, and for years was the only side in the top divisions to have never been relegated from any division. Sigurður Jónsson was appointed manager before the 2006 season, after a successful period at Víkingur. In that season, Grindavík got relegated for the first time in their history. In September 2006 with three rounds to go, Sigurður resigned as a manager and his assistants managers, Magni Fannberg Magnússon and Milan Stefán Jankovic took control. They made a draw against Fimleikafélag Hafnarfjarðar, 1:1, in the last round, but it was clear before the game that they needed to win. On September 22, 2007, Grindavík won a promotion back to the Úrvalsdeild after a 6–0 win over Reynir Sandgerði, with still one round unplayed. They managed to stay in the top league from 2008 until 2012, when they were again relegated to 1. deild for the 2013 season.

In 2017, Grindavík finished 5th in the Úrvalsdeild. Andri Rúnar Bjarnason finished as the league's top goalscorer and was named the player of the season.

== Honours ==
- Icelandic League Cup
  - Winners (1): 2000

== Current squad ==
As of 1 September 2026

Note: Flags indicate national team as defined under FIFA eligibility rules; some limited exceptions apply. Players may hold more than one non-FIFA nationality.

No.	Pos.	Nation	Player
1	GK	POL	Robert Błąkała
2	MF	ISL	Friðrik Franz Guðmundsson
4	DF	ISL	Damir Muminovic
5	DF	ISL	Arnór Gauti Úlfarsson
6	DF	ISL	Viktor Guðberg Hauksson
7	MF	ISL	Gunnleifur Gunnleifsson
8	MF	ISL	Stefán Jón Friðriksson
9	FW	ISL	Rúnar Ingi Eysteinsson
10	MF	ISL	Ingi Þór Sigurðsson
11	FW	ISL	Valur Þór Hákonarson
12	GK	ISL	Þórður Davíð Sigurjónsson

No.	Pos.	Nation	Player
13	FW	ISL	Aron Skúli Brynjarsson
14	MF	ISL	Haraldur Björgvin Eysteinsson
17	FW	ISL	Andri Karl Júlíusson Hammer
19	FW	ISL	Arnar Breki Gunnarsson (on loan from ÍBV)
20	MF	ISL	Mikael Máni Þorfinnsson
21	MF	ESP	Ibra Camara
22	MF	ISL	Lárus Orri Ólafsson
23	DF	ISL	Sindri Þór Guðmundsson
26	MF	ISL	Eysteinn Rúnarsson
27	FW	ISL	Heidar Ragnarsson
29	FW	ISL	Lúkas Tómasson
31	GK	ISL	Hjörvar Daði Arnarsson

=== Out on loan ===
Note: Flags indicate national team as defined under FIFA eligibility rules; some limited exceptions apply. Players may hold more than one non-FIFA nationality.

No.	Pos.	Nation	Player
19	FW	POR	Rafael Victor (at Njarðvík until 5 February 2027)
