= Stjarnan =

Icelandic sports club

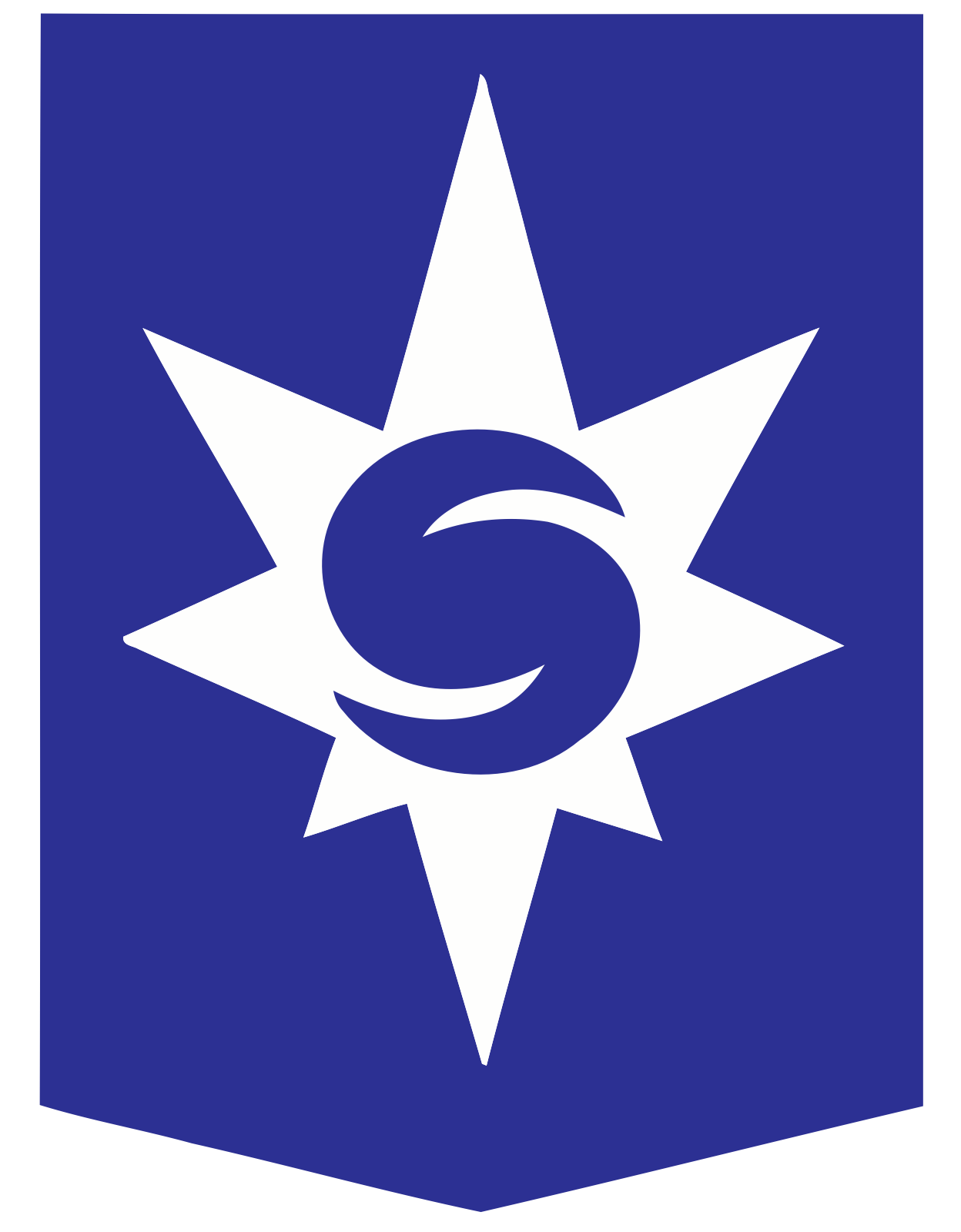
- Full name: Ungmennafélagið Stjarnan
- Short name: Stjarnan
- Sports: Basketball Football; Gymnastics; Handball Volleyball
- Founded: 1960; 66 years ago
- Based in: Garðabær

Ungmennafélagið Stjarnan (Icelandic pronunciation: [ˈuŋkˌmɛnːaˌfjɛːˌlaijɪð ˈstja(r)tnan], lit. 'The Star Youth Club' (Note: Ungmennafélagið is the definite form of Ungmennafélag, meaning "the youth club".)), commonly known as Stjarnan (lit. 'The Star'), is an Icelandic multi-sports club specialising in handball, football, basketball, volleyball and gymnastics located in Garðabær.

The club was founded by educators Rev. Bragi Friðriksson and Vilberg Júlíusson on October 30, 1960; Bragi proposed the idea of a new social outlet for the local youth of the Garðabær area, whose only after-school gathering place at the time was a convenience store. The original logo was made in 1968 by Einar D. G. Gunnlaugsson (b. 1946). The logo has undergone several changes, but remains based on the original by Einar.

== Basketball ==
=== Men's basketball ===
As of the 2017–2018 season, Stjarnan men's basketball team plays in Úrvalsdeild karla.

=== Women's basketball ===
Stjarnan finished first in the women's Division I in 2015 and defeated Njarðvík in the playoffs to win promotion to the top-tier Úrvalsdeild kvenna for the first time in its history. As of the 2017–2018 season, Stjarnan women's team plays in Úrvalsdeild kvenna.

== Football ==
=== Men's football ===
The men's team has played in the top-tier Úrvalsdeild karla since 2009. In 2014, Stjarnan won their first ever Úrvalsdeild karla title by going through the season unbeaten and equalled the Úrvalsdeild point record of 52 points.

=== Women's football ===
Stjarnan women's football team plays in Iceland's top-tier Úrvalsdeild kvenna. In 2011 the team won the championship two weeks before the end. The team also reached the final of the Icelandic Women's Cup in 1993 and 2010, losing 1–3 and 0–1 respectively. The team won the cup eventually in 2012 with a 1–0 win over Valur. In 2013 they won their second league title, winning every single game that season thus not dropping a single point.

== Handball ==
=== Men's handball ===
==== Trophies and achievements ====
- Icelandic Handball Cup (4):
  - 1987, 1989, 2006, 2007
- Division II (2):
  - 1982, 2016
- Division III (3):
  - 1974, 1976, 1981

=== Women's handball ===
==== Trophies and achievements ====
- Icelandic champions (7):
  - 1991, 1995, 1998, 1999, 2007, 2008, 2009
- Icelandic Handball Cup (7):
  - 1989, 1996, 1998, 2005, 2008, 2009, 2016
- Division II (3):
  - 2005^{1}, 2006^{1}, 2007^{1}

^{1} B-team

== Volleyball ==
=== Men's volleyball ===
==== Trophies and achievements ====
- Icelandic champions (5):
  - 2003, 2004, 2006, 2007, 2008
- Icelandic Volleyball Cup (6):
  - 2003, 2004, 2005, 2006, 2007, 2008
