= Knattspyrnufélagið Þróttur =

Icelandic association football club

Þróttur
- Full name: Knattspyrnufélagið Þróttur
- Nickname: Köttarar
- Founded: 5 August 1949
- Ground: Eimskipsvöllurinn; Reykjavík, Iceland
- Capacity: 2,000
- Chairman: Helgi Sævarsson (sports club); Kristján Kristjánsson (football department)
- Manager: Ian jeffs (men's team)
- League: 1. deild karla
- 2025: 1. deild karla, 3rd of 12
| Home colours | Away colours |

Knattspyrnufélagið Þróttur (Icelandic pronunciation: [ˈkʰnahtˌspɪ(r)tnʏˌfjɛːˌlaijɪð ˈθrouhtʏr̥], lit. 'Strength Football Club' (Note: Knattspyrnufélagið is the definite form of Knattspyrnufélag, meaning "the football club".)), also referred to as Þróttur Reykjavík or Throttur, is a professional sports club from Reykjavík in Iceland. The club runs a football department as well as handball, volleyball and tennis departments. The club has enjoyed tremendous success in men's volleyball, winning a total of 14 Icelandic Championships since 1974. The handball department enjoyed great success in the early 1980s, winning its major honour, the Icelandic handball cup, in 1981. Football has been played by the club from start, and is the biggest of the four departments.

== History ==
The club was founded on 5 August 1949. The club was founded in a Nissen hut on the west side of Reykjavík. The club drew support from local area which in the 1950s included large numbers of Nissen huts, an area that was in many ways poverty stricken. The club struggled financially for the first years. The club moved in 1969 to the east side of Reykjavík to a new district that was expanding in the 1960s. The club founded a handball department in the 1950s, and was quite successful in women's handball, winning every available trophy in 1957. A volleyball department was founded in 1974 and has since become the most successful volleyball team in Iceland. The handball department faced financial difficulties in the late 1980s and was disbanded in 1989, but revived in the year 2000. From 1989 the club has also had a Tennis department.

The club moved its headquarters again in 1999 to the nearby area of Laugardalur. Plans to merge the club with neighbors Glímufélagið Ármann did not prove successful, the two clubs now share a location but specialize in different types of sports. Þróttur concentrate more on group sports whereas Ármann focuses more on individual sports, except for basketball.

=== Recent seasons in football ===
The team played in the Úrvalsdeild Karla (men's premier division) in 2005, but it was relegated to the 1. deild karla (men's second league level). They clinched promotion again after the 2007 season. In 2008 the team finished in 10th place, just above the relegation zone. Þróttur was the first to be relegated during the 2009 season, having been sent down after playing only 19 games out of the 22. The 2010 season saw the return of former favorite player, Páll Einarsson, as coach. The season was an overall disappointment and the club finished in mid table in division one. In the following season, the team finished in similar position. The 2012 started off badly, but a mid season turnaround meant that the team made a challenge for promotion, but in the end came in 3rd place. After another poor start to the 2013 season Páll Einarsson was sacked and was replaced by Serbian Zoran Milkjović. Following the 2013 season, Zoran Milkjović left the club, and was replaced by Gregg Ryder who had previously been the assistant coach at ÍBV.

The women's team was promoted to the Úrvalsdeild kvenna (women's top division) in 2010, but got relegated the year after. In 2012 the team got off to bad start but nevertheless managed to win the league and promotion back into the top division.

== Current squad ==
As of 22 July 2026

Note: Flags indicate national team as defined under FIFA eligibility rules; some limited exceptions apply. Players may hold more than one non-FIFA nationality.

| No. | Pos. | Nation | Player |
|---|---|---|---|
| 1 | GK | ISL | Þórhallur Ísak Guðmundsson |
| 2 | MF | ISL | Eiríkur Þórsteinsson Blöndal |
| 3 | DF | ISL | Stefán Þórður Stefánsson |
| 4 | MF | ISL | Njördur Þórhallsson |
| 5 | DF | ISL | Kolbeinn Nói Guðbergsson |
| 6 | MF | ISL | Jakob Ocares Kristjánsson |
| 7 | MF | ISL | Tryggvi Snær Geirsson |
| 8 | MF | ISL | Baldur Hannes Stefánsson |
| 9 | FW | ISL | Adam Árni Róbertsson |
| 10 | FW | ISL | Sigurður Egill Lárusson |
| 11 | MF | ISL | Magnús Þórdarson (on loan from Fram) |

| No. | Pos. | Nation | Player |
|---|---|---|---|
| 12 | GK | ISL | Aron Dagur Birnuson (on loan from Stjarnan) |
| 20 | DF | ISL | Viktor Steinarsson |
| 21 | DF | ISL | Brynjar Gautur Harðarson |
| 22 | MF | ISL | Kári Kristjánsson |
| 25 | MF | ISL | Hlynur Þórhallsson |
| 27 | MF | ISL | Örn Bragi Hinriksson |
| 32 | FW | ISL | Aron Snær Ingason |
| 33 | MF | ISL | Unnar Steinn Ingvarsson |
| 45 | MF | ISL | Vilhjálmur Kaldal Sigurðsson |
| — | GK | ISL | Hilmar Örn Pétursson |

=== Out on loan ===
Note: Flags indicate national team as defined under FIFA eligibility rules; some limited exceptions apply. Players may hold more than one non-FIFA nationality.

| No. / Pos. / Nation / Player; 19 / MF / ISL / Benóný Haraldsson (at Þróttur Vogum until 31 January 2027) | No. / Pos. / Nation / Player; — / MF / ISL / Birgir Halldórsson (at Þróttur Vogum until 31 January 2027) |
