= Breiðablik (men's football) =

Football team from Iceland

- Full name: Breiðablik
- Nickname: Blikar
- Founded: 12 February 1950; 76 years ago
- Ground: Kópavogsvöllur, Kópavogur, Iceland
- Capacity: 3,009 (1,709 seated)
- Chairman: Flosi Eiríksson
- Manager: Ólafur Ingi Skúlason
- League: Besta deild karla
- 2026: Besta deild karla, 5th of 12
- Website: https://breidablik.is/knattspyrna/
| Home colours | Away colours | Third colours |

The Breiðablik men's football team is the men's football department of the Breiðablik multi-sport club. It currently plays in the Besta deild karla, the top-tier men's football league in Iceland; they finished 1st in 2022 and 2024. The team is based in Kópavogur, a large town situated a short distance south of the capital of Reykjavík. Breiðablik is the first Icelandic football club to play in the group stage of a major UEFA-organized European competition, more specifically in the 2023–24 season of UEFA Europa Conference League.

== History ==
Breiðablik's first competitive match was played on 12 June 1957, a 1–0 loss against Þróttur Reykjavík. After several years in the lower leagues, Breiðablik competed in the country's top division, the Úrvalsdeild karla (Úrvalsdeild), for the first time in 1971. From 1971 to 2005, Breiðablik would bounce between the two top leagues in Iceland (Úrvalsdeild and second-tier 1. deild karla), being promoted and relegated on a regular basis.

Since being promoted into the 2006 Úrvalsdeild, Breiðablik men's team has established itself as a powerhouse in Iceland, challenging regularly on all fronts. As of completion of the COVID-19 shortened 2020 Úrvalsdeild, Breiðablik has earned a place in their 17th consecutive season in the Úrvalsdeild.

The team's first major trophy came with a win in the 2009 Icelandic Cup, followed by the team's first Úrvalsdeild champions title in 2010. Their 2009 Icelandic Cup win qualified them for their first ever European competition, entering the second qualifying round of the 2010–11 UEFA Europa League, facing Scottish Premier League side Motherwell. They lost the first leg 1–0 in Scotland, and lost by the same score in the return leg, for a loss of 0–2 on aggregate. Their 2010 Úrvalsdeild title took Breiðablik to their second consecutive European competition, entering the second qualifying round of the 2011–12 UEFA Champions League, facing Norwegian Tippeligaen champion Rosenborg, losing 2–5 on aggregate. Breiðablik won its first match in a European competition in the first qualifying round of the 2013–14 UEFA Europa League, with a 4–0 win in the first leg against Andorran Copa Constitució winner FC Santa Coloma, en route to their first aggregate win (4–0) of a round in a European competition.

With one of the largest youth facilities in Iceland, Breiðablik is almost entirely built on home-grown talent. In the early 2000s, Iceland national football team internationals who came through the Breiðablik youth ranks included: Jóhann Berg Guðmundsson (first senior national team cap in 2008); Guðmundur Kristjánsson (2009); Alfreð Finnbogason and Gylfi Sigurðsson (both in 2010).

== Players ==
=== Current squad ===
As of 15 August 2026

Note: Flags indicate national team as defined under FIFA eligibility rules; some limited exceptions apply. Players may hold more than one non-FIFA nationality.

| No. | Pos. | Nation | Player |
|---|---|---|---|
| 1 | GK | ISL | Anton Ari Einarsson |
| 4 | DF | ISL | Ásgeir Helgi Orrason |
| 5 | DF | ISL | Ívar Örn Árnason |
| 7 | MF | ISL | Höskuldur Gunnlaugsson (captain) |
| 8 | MF | ISL | Viktor Karl Einarsson |
| 9 | DF | ISL | Óli Valur Ómarsson |
| 10 | MF | ISL | Kristinn Steindórsson |
| 11 | FW | ISL | Aron Bjarnason |
| 12 | GK | ISL | Gylfi Berg Snæhólm |
| 13 | MF | ISL | Anton Logi Lúðvíksson |
| 14 | DF | ISL | Hlynur Freyr Karlsson (on loan from IF Brommapojkarna) |

| No. | Pos. | Nation | Player |
|---|---|---|---|
| 17 | MF | ISL | Valgeir Valgeirsson |
| 18 | DF | ISL | Davíð Ingvarsson |
| 19 | DF | ISL | Kristinn Jónsson |
| 21 | DF | ISL | Viktor Örn Margeirsson |
| 22 | FW | ISL | Jónatan Guðni Arnarsson |
| 23 | FW | ISL | Kristófer Kristinsson |
| 29 | DF | ISL | Gabríel Snær Hallsson |
| 30 | MF | ISL | Andri Rafn Yeoman |
| 33 | FW | ISL | Arnar Gunnleifsson |
| 99 | FW | ISL | Thorleifur Úlfarsson |

=== Out on loan ===
Note: Flags indicate national team as defined under FIFA eligibility rules; some limited exceptions apply. Players may hold more than one non-FIFA nationality.

| No. / Pos. / Nation / Player; 20 / MF / ISL / Orri Bjarkason (at ÍR until 5 February 2027) | No. / Pos. / Nation / Player |

== Player records ==
As of match played 25 August 2025 and according to official supporters site Blikar.is Players in bold are still currently playing for Breiðablik.

=== All-time appearances for Breiðablik ===
| # | Name | Career | Appearances | Goals |
|---|---|---|---|---|
| 1 | **(Iceland) Andri Rafn Yeoman** | 2009–present | 488 | 23 |
| 2 | (Iceland) **Damir Muminovic** | 2014–present | 409 | 19 |
| 3 | (Iceland) **Höskuldur Gunnlaugsson** | 2011–present | 373 | 94 |
| 4 | (Iceland) **Kristinn Steindórsson** | 2007–present | 337 | 85 |
| 5 | (Iceland) **Viktor Örn Margeirsson** | 2015–present | 322 | 17 |
| 6 | (Iceland) Olgeir Sigurgeirsson | 2003–15 | 321 | 39 |
| 7 | (Iceland) Elfar Freyr Helgason | 2008–22 | 302 | 11 |
| 8 | (Iceland) Arnar Grétarsson | 1988–10 | 285 | 61 |
| 9 | (Iceland) Kristinn Jónsson | 2007–present | 278 | 19 |
| 10 | (Iceland) Hákon Sverrisson | 1990–04 | 272 | 9 |

=== Most goals scored for Breiðablik ===
| # | Name | Career | Appearances | Goals |
|---|---|---|---|---|
| 1 | (Iceland) Guðmundur Þórðarson | 1965–74 | 173 | 92 |
| 2 | (Iceland) **Höskuldur Gunnlaugsson** | 2011–present | 373 | 94 |
| 3 | (Iceland) Jón Þórir Jónsson* | 1985–99 | 201 | 86 |
| 4 | (Iceland) **Kristinn Steindórsson** | 2007–present | 337 | 85 |
| 5 | (Iceland) Þór Hreiðarsson | 1967–81 | 266 | 76 |
| 6 | (Iceland) Thomas Mikkelsen | 2018–21 | 94 | 72 |
| 7 | (Iceland) Sigurður Grétarsson** | 1979–00 | 159 | 71 |
| 8 | (Iceland) Jón Ingi Ragnarsson | 1958–69 | 139 | 70 |
| 9 | (Iceland) Árni Vilhjálmsson | 2011–14 | 149 | 68 |
| 10 | (Iceland) Kjartan Einarsson | 1996–04 | 170 | 62 |

*Jón Þórir Jónsson played over two periods: 1985–94 and 1998–99
**Sigurður Grétarsson played over two periods: 1979–83 and 1998–00

== Notable players ==
Players from the Breiðablik youth academy who have earned international caps at senior level. Correct as of 1 April 2023.

| Nat. | Player | Date of birth | Current club | Position | International career |
|---|---|---|---|---|---|
| (Iceland) | Einar Þórhallsson | 1 July 1952 (age 74) | retired | Defender | 1976 |
| (Iceland) | Hinrik Þórhallsson | 2 February 1954 (age 72) | retired | Winger | 1976–80 |
| (Iceland) | Sigurður Grétarsson | 2 May 1962 (age 64) | retired | Forward | 1980–92 |
| (Iceland) | Ólafur Björnsson | 7 October 1958 (age 68) | retired | Defender | 1981–84 |
| (Iceland) | Sigurjón Kristjánsson | 5 April 1962 (age 64) | retired | Forward | 1982 |
| (Iceland) | Trausti Ómarsson | 4 November 1962 (age 64) | retired | Midfielder | 1982 |
| (Iceland) | Ómar Rafnsson | 23 June 1962 (age 64) | retired | Midfielder | 1982–83 |
| (Iceland) | Arnar Grétarsson | 20 February 1972 (age 54) | retired | Midfielder | 1991–04 |
| (Iceland) | Kristófer Sigurgeirsson | 19 January 1972 (age 54) | retired | Midfielder | 1994 |
| (Iceland) | Þórhalldur Hinriksson | 10 September 1976 (age 50) | retired | Midfielder | 2000–01 |
| (Iceland) | Kjartan Antonsson | 30 September 1976 (age 50) | retired | Defender | 2001 |
| (Iceland) | Marel Jóhann Baldvinsson | 18 December 1980 (age 45) | retired | Forward | 2001–08 |
| (Iceland) | Guðmann Þórisson | 30 January 1987 (age 39) | retired | Defender | 2008 |
| (Iceland) | Jóhann Berg Guðmundsson | 27 October 1990 (age 36) | (Saudi Arabia) Al-Orobah | Winger | 2008–present |
| (Iceland) | Arnór Sveinn Aðalsteinsson | 26 January 1986 (age 40) | retired | Fullback | 2009–12 |
| (Iceland) | Steinþór Freyr Þorsteinsson | 29 July 1985 (age 41) | (Iceland) Knattspyrnufélag Akureyrar | Midfielder | 2009–14 |
| (Iceland) | Guðmundur Kristjánsson | 1 March 1989 (age 37) | (Iceland) Stjarnan | Midfielder | 2009–14 |
| (Iceland) | Kristinn Jónsson | 4 August 1990 (age 36) | (Iceland) Breiðablik | Wingback | 2009–17 |
| (Iceland) | Gunnar Örn Jónsson | 30 April 1985 (age 41) | retired | Midfielder | 2010 |
| (Iceland) | Alfreð Finnbogason | 1 February 1989 (age 37) | retired | Forward | 2010–present |
| (Iceland) | Gylfi Sigurðsson | 8 September 1989 (age 37) | (Iceland) Víkingur Reykjavík | Midfielder | 2010–present |
| (Iceland) | Elfar Freyr Helgason | 27 July 1989 (age 37) | retired | Defender | 2011 |
| (United States) | Aron Jóhannsson | 10 November 1990 (age 36) | (Iceland) Valur | Forward | 2013–2015 |
| (Iceland) | Oliver Sigurjónsson | 3 March 1995 (age 31) | (Iceland) Afturelding | Midfielder | 2014–present |
| (Iceland) | Sverrir Ingi Ingason | 5 August 1993 (age 33) | (Greece) PAOK FC | Defender | 2014–present |
| (Iceland) | Árni Vilhjálmsson | 9 May 1994 (age 32) | (Lithuania) FK Žalgiris | Forward | 2017–present |
| (Iceland) | Adam Örn Arnarson | 27 August 1995 (age 31) | (Iceland) Leiknir | Defender | 2017 |
| (Iceland) | Alfons Sampsted | 6 April 1998 (age 28) | (Netherlands) Go Ahead Eagles | Defender | 2019–present |
| (Iceland) | Höskuldur Gunnlaugsson | 26 September 1994 (age 32) | (Iceland) Breiðablik | Forward | 2019–present |
| (Iceland) | Willum Þór Willumsson | 23 October 1998 (age 28) | (Netherlands) NEC Nijmegen | Midfielder | 2019–present |
| (Iceland) | Davíð Kristján Ólafsson | 15 May 1995 (age 31) | (Poland) Cracovia | Defender | 2019–present |
| (Iceland) | Elías Rafn Ólafsson | 11 March 2000 (age 26) | (Denmark) FC Midtjylland | Goalkeeper | 2021–present |
| (Iceland) | Andri Fannar Baldursson | 10 January 2002 (age 24) | (Italy) Bologna | Midfielder | 2021–present |
| (Iceland) | Patrik Sigurður Gunnarsson | 15 November 2000 (age 25) | (Norway) Viking FK | Goalkeeper | 2021–present |
| (Iceland) | Gísli Eyjólfsson | 31 May 1994 (age 32) | (Sweden) Halmstads BK | Midfielder | 2021–present |
| (Iceland) | Kolbeinn Þórðarson | 12 March 2000 (age 26) | (Sweden) IFK Göteborg | Midfielder | 2021–present |
| (Iceland) | Viktor Karl Einarsson | 30 January 1997 (age 29) | (Iceland) Breiðablik | Midfielder | 2022–present |

== Honours ==
=== League ===
Besta deild karla (First Division)

- Champions (3): 2010, 2022, 2024
- Runners-up (4): 2012, 2015, 2018, 2021

1. deild karla (Second Division)

- Champions (6): 1970, 1975, 1979, 1993, 1998, 2005

=== Cups ===
Icelandic Cup

- Champions (1): 2009.
- Runners-up (2): 1971, 2018

Icelandic League Cup

- Champions (3): 2013, 2015, 2024
- Runners-up (4): 1996, 2009, 2010, 2014.

Icelandic Super Cup

- Champions (2): 2023, 2025
- Runners-up (3): 2010, 2011, 2022.

== Club records ==
- Record League victory: 13–0 v HK, 1. deild karla 1999
- Record League defeat: 1–10 v ÍA, Úrvalsdeild 1973

== European record ==
| Season | Competition | Round | Opponents | Home | Away | Agg |
|---|---|---|---|---|---|---|
| 2010–11 | UEFA Europa League | Second qualifying round | (Scotland) Motherwell | 0–1 | 0–1 | 0–2 |
| 2011–12 | UEFA Champions League | Second qualifying round | (Norway) Rosenborg | 2–0 | 0–5 | 2–5 |
| 2013–14 | UEFA Europa League | First qualifying round | (Andorra) FC Santa Coloma | 4–0 | 0–0 | 4–0 |
| 2013–14 | UEFA Europa League | Second qualifying round | (Austria) Sturm Graz | 0–0 | 1–0 | 1–0 |
| 2013–14 | UEFA Europa League | Third qualifying round | (Kazakhstan) Aktobe | 1–0 | 0–1 | 1–1 (1–2 p) |
| 2016–17 | UEFA Europa League | First qualifying round | (Latvia) Jelgava | 2–3 | 2–2 | 4–5 |
| 2019–20 | UEFA Europa League | First qualifying round | (Liechtenstein) Vaduz | 0–0 | 1–2 | 1–2 |
| 2020–21 | UEFA Europa League | First qualifying round | (Norway) Rosenborg | 2–4 | | |
| 2021–22 | UEFA Europa Conference League | First qualifying round | Racing Luxembourg | 3–2 | 2–0 | 5–2 |
| 2021–22 | UEFA Europa Conference League | Second qualifying round | Austria Wien | 2–1 | 1–1 | 3–2 |
| 2021–22 | UEFA Europa Conference League | Third qualifying round | (Scotland) Aberdeen | 2–3 | 1–2 | 3–5 |
| 2022–23 | UEFA Europa Conference League | First qualifying round | (Andorra) UE Santa Coloma | 4–1 | 1–0 | 5–1 |
| 2022–23 | UEFA Europa Conference League | Second qualifying round | (Montenegro) Budućnost Podgorica | 2–0 | 1–2 | 3–2 |
| 2022–23 | UEFA Europa Conference League | Third qualifying round | (Turkey) İstanbul Başakşehir | 1–3 | 0–3 | 1–6 |
| 2023–24 | UEFA Champions League | Preliminary round | (San Marino) Tre Penne | 7–1 | | |
| 2023–24 | UEFA Champions League | Preliminary round | (Montenegro) Budućnost Podgorica | 5–0 | | |
| 2023–24 | UEFA Champions League | First qualifying round | (Republic of Ireland) Shamrock Rovers | 2–1 | 1–0 | 3–1 |
| 2023–24 | UEFA Champions League | Second qualifying round | (Denmark) Copenhagen | 0–2 | 3–6 | 3−8 |
| 2023–24 | UEFA Europa League | Third qualifying round | (Bosnia and Herzegovina) Zrinjski Mostar | 1–0 | 2–6 | 3−6 |
| 2023–24 | UEFA Europa Conference League | Play-off round | (North Macedonia) Struga | 1–0 | 1–0 | 2–0 |
| 2023–24 | UEFA Europa Conference League | Group B | (Belgium) Gent | 2–3 | 0–5 | 4th |
| 2023–24 | UEFA Europa Conference League | Group B | (Israel) Maccabi Tel Aviv | 1–2 | 2–3 | 4th |
| 2023–24 | UEFA Europa Conference League | Group B | (Ukraine) Zorya Luhansk | 0–1 | 0–4 | 4th |
| 2024–25 | UEFA Conference League | First qualifying round | (North Macedonia) Tikvesh | 3–1 | 2–3 | 5–4 |
| 2024–25 | UEFA Conference League | Second qualifying round | (Kosovo) Drita | 1–2 | 0–1 | 1–3 |
| 2025–26 | UEFA Champions League | First qualifying round | (Albania) Egnatia | 5–0 | 0–1 | 5–1 |
| 2025–26 | UEFA Champions League | Second qualifying round | (Poland) Lech Poznań | 0–1 | 1–7 | 1–8 |
| 2025–26 | UEFA Europa League | Third qualifying round | (Bosnia and Herzegovina) Zrinjski Mostar | 1–2 | 1–1 | 2–3 |
| 2025–26 | UEFA Conference League | Play-off round | (San Marino) Virtus | 2–1 | 3–1 | 5–2 |
| 2025–26 | UEFA Conference League | League phase | (Switzerland) Lausanne-Sport | —N/a | 3–0 | 30th |
| 2025–26 | UEFA Conference League | League phase | (Finland) KuPS | 1–1 | —N/a | 30th |
| 2025–26 | UEFA Conference League | League phase | (Ukraine) Shakhtar Donetsk | —N/a | 2–0 | 30th |
| 2025–26 | UEFA Conference League | League phase | (Turkey) Samsunspor | 2–2 | —N/a | 30th |
| 2025–26 | UEFA Conference League | League phase | (Republic of Ireland) Shamrock Rovers | 3–1 | —N/a | 30th |
| 2025–26 | UEFA Conference League | League phase | (France) Strasbourg | —N/a | 3–1 | 30th |
| 2027–28 | UEFA Europa League | First qualifying round | | | | |

== Club ranking ==
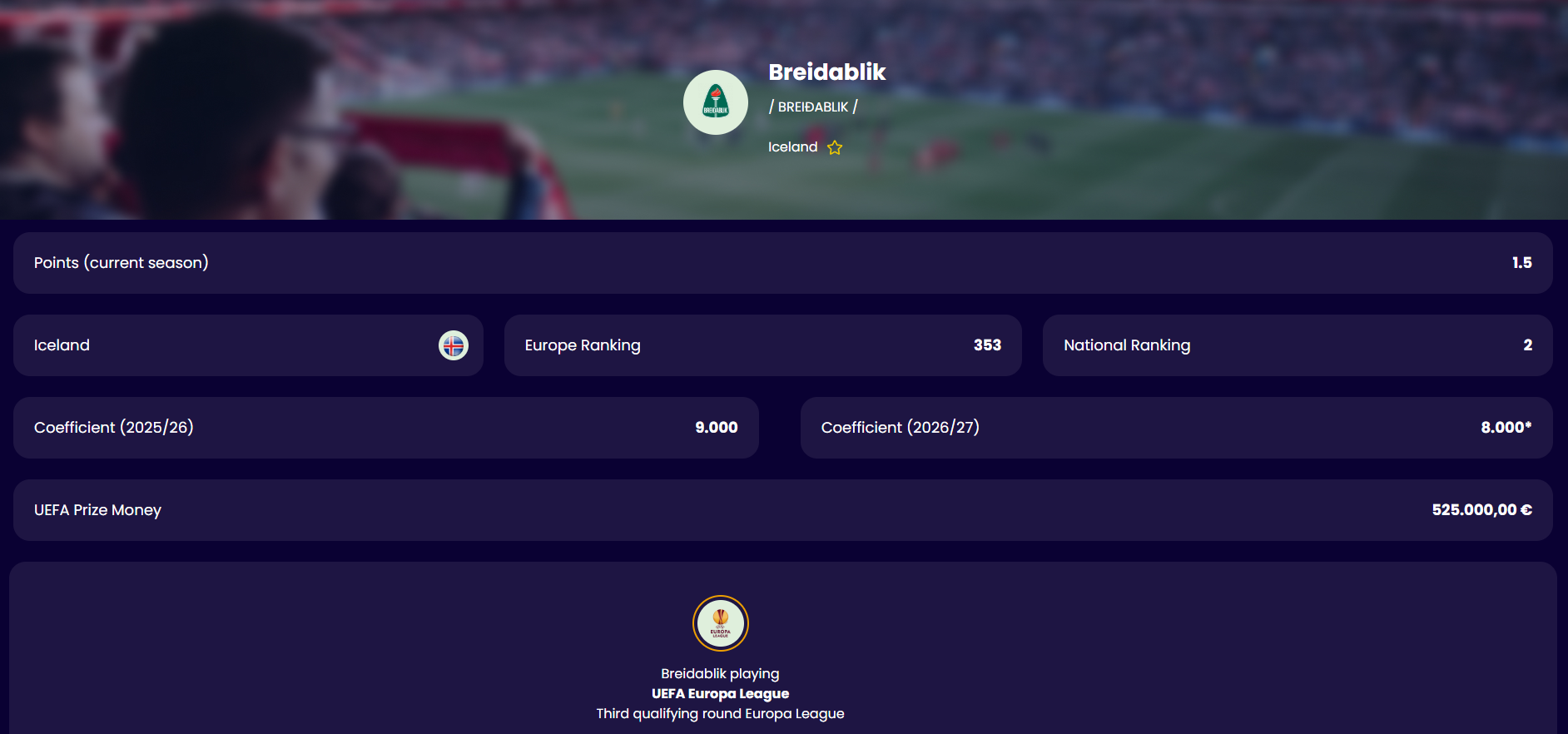

As of the 2025–2026 UEFA season, Breiðablik's coefficient status is as follows: Current UEFA Coefficient (2025/26): 9.000 Projected Coefficient (2026/27): 8.000 Europe Ranking: 353 National Ranking (Iceland): 2

== Domestic results ==
Below is a table with Breiðablik's domestic results since the club's first season in the football league in 1957.

Domestic Results since 1957
| Domestic league | League result | Qualification to | Icelandic Cup season | Cup result |
|---|---|---|---|---|
| 1957 2. deild (South) | 6th | – | – | – |
| 1958 | Did not enter | – | – | – |
| 1959 | Did not enter | – | – | – |
| 1960 2. deild (B) | 4th | – | 1960 | First round |
| 1961 2. deild (A) | 3rd | – | 1961 | Second round |
| 1962 2. deild | 4th | – | 1962 | Third round |
| 1963 2. deild (A) | 2nd | – | 1963 | First round |
| 1964 2. deild (South) | 2nd | – | 1964 | Third round |
| 1965 2. deild (B) | 3rd | – | 1965 | Second round |
| 1966 2. deild (B) | 2nd | – | 1966 | First round |
| 1967 2. deild (B) | 3rd | – | 1967 | First round |
| 1968 2. deild (B) | 2nd | – | 1968 | Second round |
| 1969 2. deild (B) | 2nd | – | 1969 | First round |
| 1970 2. deild | 1st | Úrvalsdeild (promotion) | 1970 | Quarter finals |
| 1971 Úrvalsdeild | 6th | – | 1971 | Final - runners up |
| 1972 Úrvalsdeild | 6th | – | 1972 | Round of 16 |
| 1973 Úrvalsdeild | 8th | 1. deild (relegation) | 1973 | Round of 16 |
| 1974 2. deild | 4th | – | 1974 | Round of 16 |
| 1975 1. deild | 1st | Úrvalsdeild (promotion) | 1975 | Second round |
| 1976 Úrvalsdeild | 5th | – | 1976 | Quarter finals |
| 1977 Úrvalsdeild | 6th | – | 1977 | Round of 16 |
| 1978 Úrvalsdeild | 10th | 1. deild (relegation) | 1978 | Quarter finals |
| 1979 1. deild | 1st | Úrvalsdeild (promotion) | 1979 | Round of 8 |
| 1980 Úrvalsdeild | 5th | – | 1980 | Quarter finals |
| 1981 Úrvalsdeild | 4th | – | 1981 | Round of 16 |
| 1982 Úrvalsdeild | 7th | – | 1982 | Round of 8 |
| 1983 Úrvalsdeild | 3rd | – | 1983 | Quarter finals |
| 1984 Úrvalsdeild | 9th | 1. deild (relegation) | 1984 | Round of 8 |
| 1985 1. deild | 2nd | Úrvalsdeild (promotion) | 1985 | Second round |
| 1986 Úrvalsdeild | 9th | 1. deild (relegation) | 1986 | Round of 8 |
| 1987 1. deild | 3rd | – | 1987 | First round |
| 1988 1. deild | 7th | – | 1988 | First round |
| 1989 1. deild | 5th | – | 1989 | Round of 32 |
| 1990 1. deild | 2nd | Úrvalsdeild (promotion) | 1990 | Quarter-finals |
| 1991 Úrvalsdeild | 5th | – | 1991 | Quarter-finals |
| 1992 Úrvalsdeild | 9th | 1. deild (relegation) | 1992 | Round of 16 |
| 1993 1. deild | 1st | Úrvalsdeild (promotion) | 1993 | Round of 16 |
| 1994 Úrvalsdeild | 7th | – | 1994 | Quarter-finals |
| 1995 Úrvalsdeild | 8th | – | 1995 | Round of 32 |
| 1996 Úrvalsdeild | 10th | 1. deild (relegation) | 1996 | Round of 16 |
| 1997 1. deild | 4th | – | 1997 | Quarter-finals |
| 1998 1. deild | 1st | Úrvalsdeild (promotion) | 1998 | Semi-final |
| 1999 Úrvalsdeild | 5th | – | 1999 | Semi-final |
| 2000 Úrvalsdeild | 7th | – | 2000 | Quarter-finals |
| 2001 Úrvalsdeild | 10th | 1. deild (relegation) | 2001 | Round of 16 |
| 2002 1. deild | 7th | – | 2002 | Quarter-finals |
| 2003 1. deild | 7th | – | 2003 | Round of 32 |
| 2004 1. deild | 4th | – | 2004 | Round of 32 |
| 2005 1. deild | 1st | Úrvalsdeild (promotion) | 2005 | Round of 16 |
| 2006 Úrvalsdeild | 5th | – | 2006 | Round of 16 |
| 2007 Úrvalsdeild | 5th | – | 2007 | Semi-final |
| 2008 Úrvalsdeild | 5th | – | 2008 | Semi-final |
| 2009 Úrvalsdeild | 5th | Europa League (Q2) | 2009 | Winners |
| 2010 Úrvalsdeild | 1st | Champions League (Q2) | 2010 | Third round |
| 2011 Úrvalsdeild | 6th | – | 2011 | Fourth round |
| 2012 Úrvalsdeild | 2nd | Europa League (Q1) | 2012 | Semi-final |
| 2013 Úrvalsdeild | 4th | – | 2013 | Semi-final |
| 2014 Úrvalsdeild | 7th | – | 2014 | Quarter-finals |
| 2015 Úrvalsdeild | 2nd | Europa League (Q1) | 2015 | Fourth round |
| 2016 Úrvalsdeild | 6th | – | 2016 | Quarter-finals |
| 2017 Úrvalsdeild | 6th | – | 2017 | Third round |
| 2018 Úrvalsdeild | 2nd | Europa League (Q1) | 2018 | Final |
| 2019 Úrvalsdeild | 2nd | Europa League (Q1) | 2019 | Semi-final |
| 2020 Úrvalsdeild | 4th | E. Conference League (Q1) | 2020 | Quarter-finals |
| 2021 Úrvalsdeild | 2nd | E. Conference League (Q1) | 2021 | Round of 16 |
| 2022 Úrvalsdeild | 1st | Champions League (PR) | 2022 | Semi-final |
| 2023 Úrvalsdeild | 4th | E. Conference League (Q1) | 2023 | Semi-final |
| 2024 Úrvalsdeild | 1st | E. Conference League (Q2) | 2024 | Round of 32 |
| 2025 Úrvalsdeild | 4th | | 2025 | Round of 16 |
