= Eyleifur Hafsteinsson =

Icelandic footballer (born 1947)

Personal information
- Date of birth: 31 May 1947 (age 79)
- Place of birth: Akranes, Iceland
- Position: Forward

Youth career
- ÍA

Senior career*
Years	Team	Apps	(Gls)
1964–1965	ÍA	20	(17)
1966–1969	KR		(18)
1970–1973	ÍA	41	(19)
1974	ÍA	11	(1)
Total			(37)

International career
1965	Iceland U19	2	(1)
1964–1972	Iceland	26	(4)
- * Club domestic league appearances and goals

Eyleifur Hafsteinsson (born 31 May 1947) is an Icelandic former footballer who played as a forward. He won the Icelandic championship in 1968, 1970 and 1974 and the Icelandic Cup in 1966. He was part of the Iceland national team between 1964 and 1972, playing 26 matches and scoring 4 goals.

== Career ==
After coming up through the junior teams of Íþróttabandalag Akraness (ÍA), he debuted with the senior team in 1964. He became an instant hit, becoming the youngest player ever to score in the Icelandic top-tier league when he did so three days before his 17th birthday. He finished the 1964 season as the league's top goal scorer with 10 goals. The following year he spent three months in Glasgow, Scotland, where he trained with the Glasgow Rangers. He returned to ÍA before the start of the 1965 season where he scored 7 goals. In 1966, he moved to Reykjavík and joined Knattspyrnufélag Reykjavíkur where he played until 1969. In 1970, he returned to ÍA where he finished his career in 1975, at the age of 27.

== Career statistics ==
Appearances and goals by club, season and competition
Club	Season		
Club	Season	Apps	Goals
ÍA	1964	10	10
ÍA	1965	10	7
KR	1966	?	5
KR	1967	?	3
KR	1968	?	6
KR	1969	?	4
ÍA	1970	14	5
ÍA	1971	14	3
ÍA	1972	13	11
ÍA	1974	11	1

== See also ==
- List of Iceland international footballers
