= Jón Ólafur Jónsson =

Icelandic footballer

Personal information
- Date of birth: 5 December 1940 (age 85)
- Place of birth: Ísafjörður, Iceland

Youth career
- –1961: Knattspyrnufélagið Hörður

Senior career*
Years	Team	Apps	(Gls)
1961–1962	ÍBÍ		
1963–1976	ÍBK	154	(31)

International career
1969	Iceland	2	(0)
- * Club domestic league appearances and goals

Jón Ólafur Jónsson (born 5 December 1940) is an Icelandic former footballer who played for the Icelandic men's national football team in 1969. He won the Icelandic championship four times and the Icelandic Cup once as a member of ÍBK.

== Honours ==
- Icelandic Championships: 4

1964, 1969, 1971, 1973

- Icelandic Cup:

1975

== See also ==
- List of Iceland international footballers
