= 2016 Knattspyrnudeild Keflavík season =

Keflavík
2016 season
- Chairman: Jón G. Benediktsson
- Manager: Þorvaldur Örlygsson
- Stadium: Keflavíkurvöllur
- 1. deild karla: Third (ongoing)
- Deildabikar: Semi-finals, lost to KR
- Borgunarbikar: Third round, lost to Fylkir
- Top goalscorer: League: Sigurbergur Elísson (6 goals); All: Sigurbergur Elísson (7 goals)
Home colours	Away colours
- All statistics correct as of 24 August 2016.

The 2016 season is Keflavík 10th season in 1. deild karla and their 1st season in the second-tier of Icelandic football after being relegated in 2015. Along with the 1. deild karla, the club also competed in the Borgunarbikar, where they were knocked out in the third round, and the Deildabikar, where they reached the semi-finals stage before losing to KR 4–0.

== Results & fixtures ==
Win Draw Loss Postponed

=== 1. deild karla ===
6 May 2016 Match 1	HK	1 – 1	Keflavík	Kópavogur, Iceland
19:15	Leósson 62'	KSI report	Elísson 80'	Stadium: Kórinn; Referee: G. Guðmundsson

14 May 2016 Match 2	Keflavík	3 – 0	Selfoss	Keflavík, Iceland
14:00	Matthíasson 16'; Elísson 18'; Sævarsson 59'	KSI report		Stadium: Nettóvöllurinn; Referee: Adolfsson

21 May 2016 Match 3	Fjarðabyggðar	2 – 2	Keflavík	Fjarðabyggð, Iceland
14:00	Pálmason 24'; Guðmundsson 74'	KSI report	Einarsson 82'; Magnússon 88'	Stadium: Fjarðabyggðarhöllin; Referee: Þórleifsson

28 May 2016 Match 4	Keflavík	2 – 0	Grindavík	Keflavík, Iceland
14:00	Matthíasson 2'; Elísson 67' (pen.)	KSI report		Stadium: Nettóvöllurinn; Referee: Kristjánsson

4 Jun 2016 Match 5	KA	1 – 1	Keflavík	Akureyri, Iceland
14:00	Aðalsteinsson 90+1' (pen.)	KSI report	Magnússon 38'	Stadium: Akureyrarvöllur; Attendance: 415; Referee: Jónasson

12 Jun 2016 Match 6	Keflavík	2 – 2	Fram	Keflavík, Iceland
16:00	Elísson 14', 48' (pen.)	KSI report	Magnússon 35', 63'	Stadium: Nettóvöllurinn; Attendance: 351; Referee: J. Guðmundsson

24 Jun 2016 Match 7	Haukar	4 – 3	Keflavík	Hafnarfjörður, Iceland
19:15	A. Jóhannsson 7' (pen.); Barros 27'; Helgason 34', 71'; Guðmundsson (yellow card) 38' (yellow-red card)		Sveinsson 27'; Sævarsson 72'; P. Þorsteinsson 90+3'	Stadium: Ásvellir; Referee: Jóhannsson

2 Jul 2016 Match 8	Keflavík	0 – 0	Huginn	Keflavík, Iceland
14:00		KSI report		Stadium: Nettóvöllurinn; Referee: Jónsson

8 Jul 2016 Match 9	Leiknir F	2 – 3	Keflavík	Fjarðabyggð, Iceland
15:30	Jónsson 40'; Jonsson 65'	KSI report	Matthíasson 15'; Sævarsson 56'; M. Þorsteinsson 90+3'	Stadium: Fjarðabyggðarhöllin; Attendance: 153; Referee: Adolfsson

12 Jul 2016 Match 10	Þór	1 – 2	Keflavík	Akureyri, Iceland
18:00	G. Stefánsson 76'	KSI report	Elísson 7'; Sveinsson 29'	Stadium: Þórsvöllur; Attendance: 497; Referee: Þórleifsson

16 Jul 2016 Match 11	Keflavík	0 – 0	Leiknir R	Keflavík, Iceland
16:00		KSI report	Hlöðversson (yellow card) 90' (yellow-red card)	Stadium: Nettóvöllurinn; Attendance: 250; Referee: Jónasson

21 Jul 2016 Match 12	Keflavík	3 – 2	HK	Keflavík, Iceland
19:15	Matthíasson 15'; Einarsson 67', 88'	KSI report	H. Jónsson 2', 18'	Stadium: Nettóvöllurinn; Attendance: 300; Referee: Huxtable

1 Aug 2016 Match 13	Selfoss	0 – 0	Keflavík	Sefloss, Iceland
19:15		KSI report		Stadium: JÁVERK-völlur; Attendance: 430; Referee: Kristjánsson

6 Aug 2016 Match 14	Keflavík	2 – 1	Fjarðabyggðar	Keflavík, Iceland
14:00	Matthíasson 36'; J. Guðmundsson 61'	KSI report	Željko 90+2'	Stadium: Nettóvöllurinn; Attendance: 220; Referee: Jóhannsson

11 Aug 2016 Match 15	Grindavík	1 – 0	Keflavík	Grindavík, Iceland
19:15	Þorsteinsson 71'	KSI report		Stadium: Grindavíkurvöllur; Referee: G. Guðmundsson

16 Aug 2016 Match 16	Keflavík	0 – 0	KA	Keflavík, Iceland
18:30		KSI report		Stadium: Nettóvöllurinn; Attendance: 390; Referee: P. Guðmundsson

20 Aug 2016 Match 17	Fram	1 – 0	Keflavík	Reykjavík, Iceland
14:00	Bubalo 60'	KSI report		Stadium: Laugardalsvöllur; Referee: Þórleifsson

=== Deildabikar ===
14 Feb 2016 Group 1, Match 1	Keflavík	1 – 0	ÍBV	Reykjanesbær
14:00	G. Magnusson 57'	KSI Report		Stadium: Reykjaneshöllin; Referee: Helgi Mikael Jónasson

4 Mar 2016 Group 1, Match 2	Valur	0 – 0	Keflavík	Reykjavík
17:00		KSI Report		Stadium: Egilshöll; Referee: Sigurdur Oli Þorleifsson

9 Mar 2016 Group 1, Match 3	Keflavík	3 – 2	Stjarnan	Reykjanesbær
19:00	G. Magnusson 34'; Þorsteinsson 55'; Matthíasson 63'	KSI Report	Hansen 32'; Gunnarsson 90+2'	Stadium: Reykjaneshöllin; Referee: Vilhjálmur Alvar Þórarinsson

18 Mar 2016 Group 1, Match 4	Fram Reykjavík	0 – 5	Keflavík	Reykjavík
19:00	Paponja (red card) 5'	KSI Report	Ljubičić 16' (pen.), 68' (pen.); Antoníusson 35'; Matthíasson 42'; Elvarsson 88'	Stadium: Egilshöll; Referee: Garðar Örn Hinriksson

1 Apr 2016 Group 1, Match 5	Keflavík	0 – 1	Huginn	Reykjanesbær
20:30		KSI Report	Stefánsson 70'	Stadium: Reykjaneshöllin; Referee: Frosti Viðar Gunnarsson

8 Apr 2016 Quarter-finals	Keflavík	0 – 0 (4 – 2 p)	FH	Reykjanesbær
18:00		KSI Report		Stadium: Reykjaneshöllin; Attendance: 180; Referee: Pétur Guðmundsson

15 Apr 2016 Semi-finals	KR	4–0	Keflavík	Reykjavík
19:00	Andersen 44', 45'; Friðjónsson 62'; Sigurðsson 90'	KSI Report		Stadium: KR-völlur; Referee: Þóroddur Hjaltalín

=== Borgunarbikar ===
10 May 2016 Second round	Skallagrímur	0 – 2	Keflavík	Borgarnes, Iceland
19:00		KSI Report	Elísson 66'; Gylfason 90+2'	Stadium: Skallagrímsvöllur; Referee: Sveinbjörnsson

25 May 2016 Third round	Keflavík	1 – 2	Fylkir	Keflavík, Iceland
19:15	M. Þorsteinsson 90+2' (pen.)	KSI Report	Sveinsson 37'; Þorvarðarson 41'	Stadium: Nettóvöllurinn; Attendance: 280; Referee: Gunnarsson

== Squad statistics ==
=== Appearances and goals ===
Last updated 23 August 2016

No.	Pos	Nat	Player	Total		1. deild karla		Deildabikar		Borgunarbikar	
No.	Pos	Nat	Player	Apps	Goals	Apps	Goals	Apps	Goals	Apps	Goals
1	GK	(Iceland) ISL	Beitir Ólafsson	16	0	16	0	0	0	0	0
2	DF	(Iceland) ISL	Anton Freyr Hauksson	2	0	2	0	0	0	0	0
3	DF	(Iceland) ISL	Guðjón Árni Antoníusson	13	0	13	0	0	0	0	0
4	DF	(Iceland) ISL	Haraldur Freyr Guðmundsson	17	0	17	0	0	0	0	0
5	DF	(Iceland) ISL	Jónas Guðni Sævarsson	17	3	17	3	0	0	0	0
6	MF	(Iceland) ISL	Einar Orri Einarsson	15	3	15	3	0	0	0	0
7	MF	(Iceland) ISL	Jóhann Guðmundsson	6	1	6	1	0	0	0	0
8	MF	(Iceland) ISL	Bojan Stefán Ljubicic	7	0	7	0	0	0	0	0
9	MF	(Iceland) ISL	Sigurbergur Elísson	15	6	15	6	0	0	0	0
10	FW	(Iceland) ISL	Hörður Sveinsson	8	2	8	2	0	0	0	0
11	MF	(Iceland) ISL	Magnús Sverrir Þorsteinsson	11	1	11	1	0	0	0	0
13	DF	(Scotland) SCO	Marc McAusland	17	0	17	0	0	0	0	0
14	MF	(Iceland) ISL	Haukur Baldvinsson	2	0	2	0	0	0	0	0
15	DF	(Iceland) ISL	Ási Þórhallsson	0	0	0	0	0	0	0	0
16	MF	(Iceland) ISL	Páll Olgeir Þorsteinsson	10	1	10	1	0	0	0	0
17	MF	(Iceland) ISL	Hólmar Örn Rúnarsson	0	0	0	0	0	0	0	0
18	FW	(Scotland) SCO	Craig Reid	7	0	7	0	0	0	0	0
19	MF	(Iceland) ISL	Leonard Sigurðsson	0	0	0	0	0	0	0	0
20	MF	(Iceland) ISL	Magnús Þórir Matthíasson	16	5	16	5	0	0	0	0
21	GK	(Iceland) ISL	Sindri Kristinn Ólafsson	2	0	2	0	0	0	0	0
22	FW	(Iceland) ISL	Guðmundur Magnússon	8	2	8	2	0	0	0	0
23	DF	(Iceland) ISL	Axel Kári Vignisson	16	0	16	0	0	0	0	0
24	MF	(Iceland) ISL	Daníel Gylfason	4	0	4	0	0	0	0	0
25	MF	(Iceland) ISL	Frans Elvarsson	9	0	9	0	0	0	0	0
29	MF	(Iceland) ISL	Fannar Orri Sævarsson	0	0	0	0	0	0	0	0
30	MF	(Iceland) ISL	Samúel Þór Traustason	0	0	0	0	0	0	0	0
32	MF	(Scotland) SCO	Stuart Carswell	7	0	7	0	0	0	0	0
45	MF	(Iceland) ISL	Tómas Óskarsson	11	0	11	0	0	0	0	0
–	FW	(Iceland) ISL	Stefan Alexander Ljubicic	0	0	0	0	0	0	0	0

== Transfers ==
=== Players in ===
Date	Position	No.	Nationality	Name	From	Fee	Ref.
1 March 2016	DF	13	(Scotland)	Marc McAusland	(Scotland) Dunfermline Athletic	Free	
15 July 2016	DF	18	(Scotland)	Craig Reid	(Scotland) Dunfermline Athletic	Free	
15 July 2016	MF	42	(Scotland)	Stuart Carswell	(Scotland) St Mirren	Free	

=== Players out ===
Date	Position	Nationality	Name	To	Fee	Ref.
