= Karl Þórðarson =

Icelandic association football player

Personal information
- Full name: Karl Eðvarð Þórðarson
- Date of birth: 31 May 1955 (age 71)
- Place of birth: Iceland
- Position: Midfielder

Senior career*
| Years | Team | Apps | (Gls) |
| 1972–1978 | ÍA | | |
| 1978–1981 | RAAL | | |
| 1981–1984 | Laval | 98 | (12) |
| 1984–1985 | ÍA | 17+ | (3+) |
| 1988–1991 | ÍA | 70 | (4) |
| 1994 | ÍA | 3 | (0) |

International career
| 1972 | Iceland U-19 | 1 | (0) |
| 1975–1984 | Iceland | 16 | (0) |
- * Club domestic league appearances and goals

Karl Eðvarð Þórðarson (born 31 May 1955) is an Icelandic former footballer who played as a midfielder, most notably for ÍA. Besides Iceland, he has played in Belgium and France. During his career, he won the Icelandic Championship five times and the Icelandic Cup twice with ÍA.

== Club career ==
Karl started his career with ÍA in 1972 and played with the team until December 1978 when he was sold to Belgian side RAAL for 1.5 million ISK. The same year, he was named the Icelandic Footballer of the Year. In 1981, Karl signed for Laval in the French Ligue 1, where he made 98 league appearances and scored 12 goals. On 23 July 1981, he debuted for Laval during a 1–1 draw with Sochaux. On 3 August 1981, Karl scored his first 2 goals for Laval during a 2–0 win over Auxerre. In 1984, he returned to Iceland and signed back with ÍA, helping the team win both the national championship and the national cup. Following the 1985 season, Karl announced his retirement from football. Three years later, he made a comeback with ÍA and played for the team until 1991 when he retired again. He came out of retirement again in 1994, playing a reserve role for ÍA and winning his fifth and last national championship before retiring for the final time.

== International career ==
Karl played for the Iceland men's national football team from 1975 to 1984.

== Titles ==
- Icelandic Championship (5): 1974, 1975, 1977, 1984, 1994
- Icelandic Cup (2): 1978, 1984,
- 1. deild karla: 1991

== Personal life ==
Karl is the son of former international Þórður Jónsson and nephew of footballer and manager Ríkharður Jónsson.
