= 2001 Úrvalsdeild =

Úrvalsdeild
- Season: 2001
- Dates: May 15 – September 23
- Champions: ÍA (18th title)
- Relegated: Valur; Breiðablik
- Champions League: ÍA
- UEFA Cup: ÍBV
- Matches: 90
- Goals: 235 (2.61 per match)
- Top goalscorer: 15 goals: Hjörtur Hjartarson

The 2001 season of Úrvalsdeild was the 90th season of male league football in the top tier division in Iceland. The season was contested by 10 teams, where ÍA won their 18th championship. ÍA's Hjörtur Hjartarson was the top scorer with 15 goals.

== Final league table ==
Pos	Team	Pld	W	D	L	GF	GA	GD	Pts	Qualification or relegation
1	ÍA (C)	18	11	3	4	29	16	+13	36	Qualification for the Champions League first qualifying round
2	ÍBV	18	11	3	4	23	15	+8	36	Qualification for the UEFA Cup qualifying round
3	FH	18	9	5	4	23	16	+7	32	Qualification for the Intertoto Cup first round
4	Grindavík	18	9	0	9	27	29	−2	27	
5	Fylkir	18	7	4	7	26	23	+3	25	Qualification for the UEFA Cup qualifying round
6	Keflavík	18	6	5	7	27	30	−3	23	
7	KR	18	6	4	8	16	20	−4	22	
8	Fram	18	6	2	10	28	28	0	20	
9	Valur (R)	18	5	4	9	19	26	−7	19	Relegation to 1. deild karla
10	Breiðablik (R)	18	4	2	12	17	32	−15	14	Relegation to 1. deild karla

Rules for classification: 1) points; 2) goal difference; 3) number of goals scored.
(C) Champions; (R) Relegated

== Results ==
Each team played every opponent once home and away for a total of 18 matches.

Home \ Away	BRE	FH	FRA	FYL	GRI	ÍA	ÍBV	ÍBK	KR	VAL
Breiðablik		1–2	1–0	0–2	2–4	2–3	1–0	2–4	0–0	2–1
FH	3–0		1–0	0–0	0–2	0–1	0–1	2–2	2–0	1–0
Fram	2–1	1–1		3–0	1–2	1–0	0–1	5–3	0–1	2–3
Fylkir	0–1	0–2	4–2		2–3	2–1	4–0	2–2	1–0	0–0
Grindavík	2–1	1–2	1–3	0–4		3–0	3–1	1–2	0–2	2–0
ÍA	3–1	2–2	1–0	3–0 (Note: The match was interrupted in the 24th minute at 1–0 due to very bad weather and was repeated the next day.)	3–1		0–0	2–0	2–0	2–0
ÍBV	1–0	0–0	1–3	3–1	3–0	2–2		1–0	1–0	2–0
Keflavík	2–1	3–1	2–2	2–1	0–2	0–1	0–2		3–1	1–1
KR	1–1	1–2	2–1	0–0	2–0	2–1	0–2	2–0		0–0
Valur	2–0	1–2	3–2	1–3	1–0	0–2	1–2	1–1	4–2	

Legend: Blue = home team win; Yellow = draw; Red = away team win.

== Top goalscorers ==
Rank	Player	Club	Goals
1	(Iceland) Hjörtur Hjartarson	ÍA	15
2	(Iceland) Ásmundur Arnarsson	Fram	10
3	(Iceland) Grétar Hjartarson	Grindavík	9
3	(Iceland) Þórarinn Kristjánsson	Keflavík	9
5	(Iceland) Tómas Ingi Tómasson	ÍBV	8
6	(Iceland) Kristján Brooks	Breiðablik	7
6	(Federal Republic of Yugoslavia) Siniša Valdimar Kekić	Grindavík	7
6	(Iceland) Haukur Ingi Guðnason	Keflavík	7
9	(Iceland) Grétar Rafn Steinsson	ÍA	6
9	(Iceland) Guðmundur Steinarsson	Keflavík	6
9	(Iceland) Sævar Þór Gíslason	Fylkir	6
