= Hermann Gunnarsson =

Icelandic footballer (1946–2013)

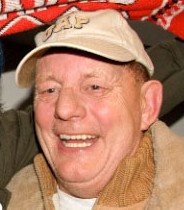
- Hermann in 2009

Personal information
- Full name: Hermann Gunnarsson
- Date of birth: 9 December 1946
- Place of birth: Iceland
- Date of death: 4 June 2013 (aged 66)
- Place of death: Thailand
- Position: Striker

Youth career
- 1955–1956: Víkingur R.
- 1957–1963: Valur

Senior career*
Years	Team	Apps	(Gls)
1963–1968	Valur		
1969	SC Eisenstadt		
1970	ÍBA		(14)
1971–1976	Valur		

International career
1967–1973	Iceland	14	(4)
1967	Iceland Olympic	2	(0)
1966–1968	Iceland amateur	4	(2)

Managerial career
- 1970: ÍBA
- * Club domestic league appearances and goals

Hermann Gunnarsson
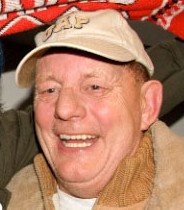

Personal information
- Nationality: Icelandic
- Born: 9 December 1946
- Died: 4 June 2013 (aged 66)

Sport
- Sport: Handball

Senior clubs
- Years: Team
- ca. 1964–1968: Valur
- ca. 1970: Leiknir R.
National team
Years	Team	Apps	(Gls)
–	Iceland	15	(45)

Hermann Gunnarsson (9 December 1946 – 4 June 2013) commonly referred to by his nickname, Hemmi Gunn, was an Icelandic television and radio personality, performer and former football and handball player at an international level. Hermann is known as one of Iceland's greats both in football and handball. He also played basketball at club level (with Valur, as in football and handball), but never played a national game in that sport.

== Media personality ==
Hermann is also famous for hosting the top-rated talk show Á tali hjá Hemma Gunn on the public TV channel Sjónvarpið for many years in the 1980s and 1990s. The show still remains one of the highest rated shows in Icelandic television history.

After spending several years away from the spotlight from the late 1990s until the early 2000s he returned to television in 2005 to host a musical game show on Stöð 2. In fall 2006 he started a new weekly talk show on Stöð 2. Hermann has also released musical albums, hosted a radio show on Bylgjan among other activities. He spent some years in Thailand during his break from the media.

== Football career ==
Hermann was one of Iceland's top football players in the 1960s and 70s and played with the national football team. He played 14 official matches, scoring 4 goals, 4 matches against amateur sides, scoring 2 goals and 2 games against the Spanish amateur team in an Olympic qualifier, not scoring in those matches.

Hermann played with Víkingur R. until he was 10 years old, when he switched to Valur. One summer he scored 62 goals in 15 games for their youth team. Hermann started his senior career in 1963 with Valur, where he played until 1968, when he moved to Austria to play as a professional with SC Eisenstadt, the third Icelander to play as a professional footballer, after Albert Guðmundsson and Þórólfur Beck. He returned home after 6 months, refusing offers from Austria and West Germany. In the 1967–68 European Cup, when Valur reached the last 16 (or less impressively, the 2nd round), he was 5th-7th in the top scorer list, scoring 4 goals, after having jointly-lead with 3 goals after 2 matches with George Best and Paul Van Himst. In 1970, he played with and managed ÍBA (Sport alliance of Akureyri, composed of KA and Þór A.), but returned to Valur before the 1971 season where he spent the remainder of his career, retiring before the 1977 Úrvalsdeild season to become a sports reporter. In total Hermann scored 95 times in the Úrvalsdeild, 81 times with Valur and 14 times with ÍBA.

Hermann was top scorer of the Úrvalsdeild three times, in 1967 with Valur (12 goals in a season with 10 matches), in 1970 with ÍBA (14 goals in a season with 14 matches) and in 1973 with Valur (17 goals in 13 matches).

In 1970 he was the player-manager of ÍBA, 23 years old, the youngest manager in the history of the Úrvalsdeild. The club finished 6th out of 8 teams that year.

== Handball career ==
Hermann also represented the Icelandic national handball team, scoring 45 goals in 15 matches. He claimed in an interview in 1977 to be the (then) world-record holder for goals scored in a national handball game, as he scored 17 goals when Iceland won the United States 41–17 in 1966.

== Basketball ==
Outside of football and handball, Hermann also played for Valur's basketball team in the Icelandic top-tier league. He played his first official senior team game on 24 January 1971, scoring 4 points.
