= 1975 Icelandic Cup =

Bikarkeppni karla

Tournament details
- Country: Iceland

Final positions
- Champions: Keflavík
- Runners-up: ÍA

The 1975 Icelandic Cup was the 16th edition of the National Football Cup.

It took place between 24 June 1975 and 13 September 1975, with the final played at Laugardalsvöllur in Reykjavík. The cup was important, as winners qualified for the UEFA Cup Winners' Cup (if a club won both the league and the cup, the defeated finalists would take their place in the Cup Winners' Cup).

Clubs from the 1. Deild entered in the last 16, with clubs from lower tiers entering in the three preliminary rounds. Teams played one-legged matches. In case of a draw, the match was replayed at the opposition's ground.

Keflavík won their first Icelandic Cup, beating ÍA in the final, who were runners-up for the second consecutive year. The club therefore qualified for Europe.

== First round ==
Team 1	Score	Team 2
25 June 1975
Völsungur	4–1	Leiftur Ólafsfjörður
þór Akureyri	6–1	KS Sarafjörður
þrottur Norðfjörður	9–0	Höttur
Austri Eskifjörður	1–2	Huginn
Valur Reyðarfjörður	3–0	HSK
UMS Skagafjörður	1–3	Reynir Árskógsströnd
9 July 1975
HV	1–0	Bolungarvík

== Second round ==
Team 1	Score	Team 2
24 June 1975
Fylkir	4–1	Grótta
Selfoss	3–0	ÍR
25 June 1975
Breiðablik	1–3	Ármann Reykjavík
Afturelding	0–5	þróttur
9 July 1975
Huginn	1–2	þrottur Norðfjörður
Leiknir F.	4–1	Valur Reyðarfjörður
Reynir Árskógsströnd	3–1	Völsungur
KA Akureyri	1–3	þór Akureyri
ÍBÍ	2–0	Víkingur Ó.
17 July 1975
Grundarfjörður	2–3	HV

== Third round ==
- Entry of eight teams from the 2. Deild

Team 1	Score	Team 2
8 July 1975
Stjarnan	0–2	Selfoss
Leiknir Reykjavík	2–6	Þór Þorlákshöfn
Grindavík	2–1	Víðir
9 July 1975
Ármann Reykjavík	3–0	Fylkir
23 July 1975
Haukar	w/o	þróttur
HV	0–7	ÍBÍ
þór Akureyri	2–0	Reynir Árskógsströnd
þrottur Norðfjörður	1–0	Leiknir F.

== Fourth round ==
- Entry of eight teams from the 1. Deild

Team 1	Score	Team 2
30 July 1975
Haukar	1–5	þór Akureyri
Grindavík	0–3	FH
KR	2–0	Fram
ÍA	3–1	Ármann Reykjavík
Þór Þorlákshöfn	0–2	Víkingur
Keflavík	3–0	ÍBÍ
Valur	8–0	Selfoss
ÍBV	6–0	þróttur

== Quarter-finals ==
Team 1	Score	Team 2
13 August 1975
Víkingur	0–2	Keflavík
þór Akureyri	1–2	KR
Valur	5–1	ÍBV
FH	0–3	ÍA

== Semi-finals ==
Team 1	Score	Team 2
27 August 1975
Keflavík	2–1	KR
ÍA	1–0	Valur

== Final ==
13 September 1975

Keflavík	1–0	ÍA
Gunnarsson	Report

Laugardalsvöllur, Reykjavík
- Keflavík won their second Icelandic Cup and qualified for the 1976–77 European Cup Winners' Cup.

== See also ==
- 1975 Úrvalsdeild
- Icelandic Men's Football Cup
