= 1965 Úrvalsdeild =

Úrvalsdeild
- Season: 1965

In 1965, the Icelandic football tournament was held for the 54th time. KR won its 19th title after defeating ÍA 2–1 in an extra game for the championship after both teams where tied with 13 points at the end of the season. KR's Baldvin Baldvinsson was the top scorer with 11 goals.. Six teams participated; KR, Fram, ÍBA, ÍA, Valur and Keflavík.

== Final league table ==
Pos	Team	Pld	W	D	L	GF	GA	GD	Pts	Qualification or relegation
1	KR (C)	10	5	3	2	22	15	+7	13	Qualification for the European Cup first round
2	ÍA	10	6	1	3	24	16	+8	13	
3	Keflavík	10	4	3	3	18	15	+3	11	
4	ÍBA	10	5	1	4	14	19	−5	11	Qualification for the Cup Winners' Cup preliminary round
5	Valur	10	3	1	6	19	23	−4	7	
6	Fram (R)	10	2	1	7	10	19	−9	5	Relegation to 1. deild karla

Source: rsssf.com
Rules for classification: 1) points; 2) goal difference; 3) number of goals scored.
(C) Champions; (R) Relegated

== Results ==
Each team played every opponent once home and away for a total of 10 matches.

Home \ Away	FRA	ÍA	ÍBA	ÍBK	KR	VAL
Fram		0–1	1–2	1–1	1–2	2–1
ÍA	2–3		2–0	1–2	4–1	3–2
ÍBA	2–1	2–2		2–0	1–3	2–1
Keflavík	5–0	2–1	0–1		1–1	4–3
KR	1–0	2–3	5–0	3–3		3–0
Valur	2–1	2–5	4–2	2–0	2–2	

Legend: Blue = home team win; Yellow = draw; Red = away team win.

== Championship match ==
3 October 1965

KR	2–1	ÍA
Einar Ísfeld 13'; Baldvin Baldvinsson 62'		Skúli Hákonarson 21'; Eyleifur Hafsteinsson (penalty missed)

Laugardalur, Reykjavík
Attendance: 9,600
Referee: Hannes Þ. Sigurðsson
