= Haukur Ingi Guðnason =

Icelandic footballer

Personal information
- Full name: Haukur Ingi Guðnason
- Date of birth: 8 September 1978 (age 48)
- Place of birth: Keflavik, Iceland
- Height: 5 ft 10 in (1.78 m)
- Positions: Winger; forward

Senior career*
Years	Team	Apps	(Gls)
1995–1997	Keflavik	34	(11)
1997–2000	Liverpool	0	(0)
2000	→ KR (loan)	13	(0)
2001–2002	Keflavik	28	(9)
2003–2008	Fylkir	63	(19)
2009–2010	Keflavik	20	(5)
2011	Grindavík	7	(0)
Total		165	(44)

International career
1998–2002	Iceland	8	(0)

Managerial career
- 2012: Fylkir (assistant)
- 2015–: Keflavik
- * Club domestic league appearances and goals

Haukur Ingi Guðnason (born 8 September 1978 in Keflavik) is a retired Icelandic footballer who formerly played for Grindavík.

== Club career ==
Haukur Ingi began his career with Keflavík Football Club, before making a move to the renowned English club Liverpool in 1997. Despite spending three years at Anfield, he was unable to secure a spot in the first team and subsequently returned to Iceland in 2000. He had a loan spell at KR before rejoining Keflavik and later moving to Fylkir in 2003. Haukur remained with Fylkir until the end of 2008, at which point he rejoined his former club, Keflavík. Haukur was known for his pace and versatility, playing as a winger or forward.

== International career ==
Haukur Ingi has represented Iceland and made his debut in a friendly match against South Africa in June 1998.

== Honours ==
Keflavik

- Icelandic Cup: 1997

== Personal life ==
Haukur Ingi's father is Guðni Kjartansson, a former player and coach of both Keflavík Football Club and the Icelandic national team who was named Icelandic Sportsman of the Year in 1973, the first footballer to win the award. Haukur Ingi married Ragnhildur Steinunn Jónsdóttir, a former Miss Iceland and TV personality, in 2018; the couple have been together since 1996 and have four children.
