= Sándor Matus =

Hungarian footballer

Personal information
- Date of birth: 31 October 1976 (age 50)
- Place of birth: Székesfehérvár, Hungary
- Height: 1.87 m (6 ft 2 in)
- Position: Goalkeeper

Senior career*
Years	Team	Apps	(Gls)
	Fehérvár	0	(0)
–1999	Gázszer	17+	(0+)
1999	KTP	4	(0)
1999	Jazz	4	(0)
2000	Pécs	26+	(0+)
2003	RoPS		
2004–2013	KA	204	(0)
2014–2016	Þór	60	(0)
2017	Dalvík/Reynir	12	(0)
2020	ÍH	1	(0)
- * Club domestic league appearances and goals

Sándor Matus (born 31 October 1976) is a Hungarian former professional footballer who played as a goalkeeper.

== Career ==
In 1999, Matus signed for Finnish side KTP. Before the second half of 1999–00, he signed for Pécs in the Hungarian top flight, where he made over 26 league appearances and scored 0 goals. Before the 2003 season, Matus signed for Finnish second tier club RoPS.

Before the 2004 season, he signed for KA in the Icelandic top flight, where he suffered relegation to the Icelandic second tier and helped them reach the 2004 Icelandic Cup final. Before the 2017 season, Matus signed for Icelandic fourth tier team Dalvík/Reynir. In 2020, he signed for ÍH in the Icelandic fifth tier.
