= Iceland national futsal team =

Iceland
- Shirt badge/Association crest
- Nickname(s): Strákarnir okkar (Our boys)
- Association: Knattspyrnusamband Íslands
- Confederation: UEFA (Europe)
- Head coach: (Iceland) Willum Þór Þórsson
- Top scorer: Þórarinn Ingi Valdimarsson (4)
- FIFA code: ISL
- FIFA ranking: NR (29 August 2025)
Home colours	Away colours

First international
- Iceland 4–5 Latvia (Hafnarfjörður, Iceland; 21 January 2011)

Biggest win
- Iceland 6–1 Armenia (Hafnarfjörður, Iceland; 22 January 2011)

Biggest defeat
- Iceland 4–5 Latvia (Hafnarfjörður, Iceland; 21 January 2011)

FIFA World Cup
- Appearances: 0

UEFA Futsal Championship
- Appearances: 0

The Icelandic national futsal team represents Iceland in international futsal competitions such as the FIFA Futsal World Cup and the European Championships and is controlled by the Football Association of Iceland. The team debuted in the UEFA Futsal Euro 2012 Preliminary Round.

== Competition history ==
=== FIFA Futsal World Cup ===
FIFA World Cup Record
Year	Round	Pld	W	D	L	GS	GA
Thailand 2012	Did not enter	–	–	–	–	–	–
Colombia 2016	Did not enter	–	–	–	–	–	–
Lithuania 2021	Did not enter	–	–	–	–	–	–
Uzbekistan 2024	Did not enter	–	–	–	–	–	–
Total	0/4	0	0	0	0	0	0

=== UEFA European Futsal Championship ===
UEFA European Futsal Championship Record
Year	Round	Pld	W	D	L	GS	GA
Croatia 2012	Did not qualify	–	–	–	–	–	–
Belgium 2014	Did not enter	–	–	–	–	–	–
Serbia 2016	Did not enter	–	–	–	–	–	–
Slovenia 2018	Did not enter	–	–	–	–	–	–
Netherlands 2022	Did not enter	–	–	–	–	–	–
Latvia/Lithuania/Slovenia 2026	Did not enter	–	–	–	–	–	–
Total	0/6	–	–	–	–	–	–

== Current squad ==
Squad chosen for the UEFA Futsal Euro 2012 Preliminary Round, 21–24 January 2011

Pos	Name	Club
GK	Albert Sævarsson	ÍBV
GK	Einar Hjörleifsson	Víkingur Ól.
GK	Steinar Örn Gunnarsson	Fjölnir
	Aron Sigurðarson	Fjölnir
	Guðmundur Karl Guðmundsson	Fjölnir
	Illugi Þór Gunnarsson	Fjölnir
	Eiður Aron Sigurbjörnsson	ÍBV
	Tryggvi Guðmundsson	ÍBV
	Þórarinn Ingi Valdimarsson	ÍBV
	Guðmundur Steinarsson	Keflavík
	Haraldur Freyr Guðmundsson	Keflavík
	Magnús Þorsteinsson	Keflavík
	Brynjar Gauti Guðjónsson	Víkingur Ól.
	Heimir Þór Ásgeirsson	Víkingur Ól.
	Þorsteinn Már Ragnarsson	Víkingur Ól.
