= Baldvinsson =

Baldvinsson is an Icelandic patronymic, literally meaning "son of Baldvin". Notable people with the name include:

- Baldvin Baldvinsson (born 1943), Icelandic footballer
- Guðjón Baldvinsson (born 1986), Icelandic footballer
- Marel Baldvinsson (born 1980), Icelandic footballer
- Rógvi Baldvinsson (born 1989), Faroese footballer
