= 2006 Icelandic Cup =

Visa-Bikar

Tournament details
- Country: Iceland

Final positions
- Champions: Keflavík
- Runners-up: KR

The 2006 Visa-Bikar was the 47th season of the Icelandic national football cup. It started on 11 May 2006 and concluded with the final held on 30 September 2006. The winners qualified for the first qualifying round of the 2007–08 UEFA Cup.

== First round ==
The First Round consisted of 34 teams from lower Icelandic divisions. The matches were played on 11, 12 and 13 May 2006.

Team 1	Score	Team 2
11 May 2006
Afturelding	4–2	UMFL
Reynir Sandgerði	4–0	Tunglid
12 May 2006
Dalvík/Reynir	1–6	Tindastoll
GG	1–2	Skallagrimur
Grótta	5–1	Afrika
Hrunamenn	1–7	Árborg
Kari	4–1	Ymir
Neisti Hofsos	0–7	Magni
Lettir	1–2	Kjalnesingar
KE	1–4	Boltfelag Nordfjordur
IH	4–1	Ellidi
13 May 2006
Vinir	6–1	Snortur
Vidir	3–4	Hviti riddarinn
KFS	5–0	Ægir
Hvot	2–0	Hamrarnir
Drangur	2–1	Hamar
Markaregn	3–4	KV

== Second round ==
The Second Round matches were played on 18, 19 and 20 May 2006.

Team 1	Score	Team 2
18 May 2006
Sindri	5–3	Boltfelag Nordfjordur
KA	4–1	KS/Leiftur
Vinir	1–2	Þór Akureyri
Tindastoll	4–0	Volsungur
Skallagrimur	2–3	Afturelding
Selfoss	5–1	KFS
Njardvik	7–1	Kjalnesingar
Reynir Sandgerði	1–2	Drangur
ÍR	2–1	Arborg
Neisti Djupiv.	0–3	KF Fjarðabyggð
19 May 2006
Hottur	2–0	Leiknir Faskrudsfjordur
KV	4–3 (a.e.t.)	Grótta
IH	3–3 (a.e.t.); 6−5 (pen)	Kari
Magni	3–2	Hvot
20 May 2006
BI/Bolungarvik	1–4	Hviti riddarinn

== Third round ==
Third round matches were played on 30, 31 May and 1 June 2006.

Team 1	Score	Team 2
30 May 2006
Fram	4–0	Fjölnir
ÍR	3–0	Stjarnan
31 May 2006
Huginn	2–2 (a.e.t.); 3−4 (pen)	KF Fjarðabyggð
Þróttur	3–1	Vikingur Olafsvik
Þór Akureyri	6–1	Tindastoll
Njardvik	4–1	Selfoss
Drangur	0–5	Haukar
ÍH	2–4	Leiknir Reykjavík
HK	4–0	Hviti riddarinn
1 June 2006
Afturelding	6–1	KV
KA	7–0	Magni
Sindri	3–1	Hottur

== Fourth round ==
The matches were played on 14, 15 and 16 June 2006.

Team 1	Score	Team 2
14 June 2006
KF Fjarðabyggð	3–2	Sindri
15 June 2006
ÍR	0–2	Leiknir Reykjavík
Afturelding	1–2	Njarðvík
Þróttur	1–0	HK
16 June 2006
KA	2–1	Þór Akureyri
Haukar	1–5	Fram

== Fifth round ==
The matches were played on 2, 3 and 6 July 2006.

Team 1	Score	Team 2
2 July 2006
Fram	2–3 (a.e.t.)	ÍA
KF Fjarðabyggð	0–2	Valur
FH	1–2	Víkingur Reykjavík
Njardvik	0–1	KR
KA	3–2	Breiðablik
3 July 2006
Þróttur	2–1	Grindavík
Fylkir	1–2	ÍBV
6 July 2006
Leiknir Reykjavík	0–3	Keflavík

== Quarter-finals ==
The matches were played on 23 and 24 July 2006.

Team 1	Score	Team 2
23 July 2006
ÍA	3–4	Keflavík
KA	1–5	Þróttur
Valur	1–2	Víkingur Reykjavík
24 July 2006
KR	1–1 (a.e.t.); 4−2 (pen)	ÍBV

== Semi-finals ==
The matches were played on 28 and 29 August 2006.

28 August 2006

Víkingur Reykjavík	0–4	Keflavík
		Saevarsson 22'; Steinarsson 72', 90'; Kristjansson 78'

Laugardalsvöllur, Reykjavík
Attendance: 1,306
Referee: Garðar Örn Hinriksson

29 August 2006

Þróttur	0–1 (a.e.t.)	KR
		Fridgeirsson 102'

Laugardalsvöllur, Reykjavík
Attendance: 2,105
Referee: Egill Mar Markusson

== Final ==
30 September 2006

Keflavík	2–0	KR
Antoniusson 21'; Sigurdsson 30'

Laugardalsvollur, Reykjavík
Attendance: 4,699
Referee: Johannes Valgeirsson
