= Þorsteinn Bjarnason =

Icelandic footballer

Personal information
- Date of birth: 22 March 1957 (age 69)
- Place of birth: Iceland
- Position: Goalkeeper

Senior career*
Years	Team	Apps	(Gls)
1976–1978	Keflavík		
1978–1979	R.A.A. Louviéroise		
1980–1989	Keflavík	83+	
1990	FH	5	(0)
1991–1993	Grindavík		
2003–2004	Grindavík	2	(0)

International career
1978–1986	Iceland	28	(0)
- * Club domestic league appearances and goals

Þorsteinn Bjarnason (born 22 March 1957) is an Icelandic former professional footballer who played as a goalkeeper.

== Club career ==
Þorsteinn played most of his career for ÍBK Keflavík and had a brief spell in the Belgian League with R.A.A. Louviéroise.

== International career ==
He made his debut for Iceland in 1978 and went on to win 28 caps.
