= Guðjón Árni Antoníusson =

Icelandic footballer and manager

Personal information
- Full name: Guðjón Árni Antoníusson
- Date of birth: 3 September 1983 (age 43)
- Place of birth: Garður, Iceland
- Height: 1.77 m (5 ft 10 in)
- Position: Defender

Team information
- Current team: Víðir (manager)

Senior career*
Years	Team	Apps	(Gls)
2000	Víðir	11	(1)
2001–2011	Keflavík	170	(10)
2012–2015	FH	33	(6)
2015–2017	Keflavík	32	(0)

International career
2009	Iceland	1	(0)

Managerial career
- 2017–: Víðir
- * Club domestic league appearances and goals

Guðjón Árni Antoníusson (born 3 September 1983) is an Icelandic former footballer who is currently manager of Víðir. A defender, he began his playing career with Víðir before playing for Keflavík (twice) and FH.

== Career ==
=== Playing ===
Born in Garður, he started his career with his hometown club Víðir before joining Keflavík in 2001. After spending a year in the club's reserve team, Guðjón made his league debut for Keflavík in the 2–2 draw with Grindavík on 8 July 2002. Over the following ten seasons, he went on to make more than 200 appearances for the side in all competitions and was involved in both the 2004 and 2006 Icelandic Cup finals, both of which ended in wins for Keflavík. He also gained experience of playing in Europe as the team qualified for the UEFA Cup and the Intertoto Cup. On 22 March 2009, he made his international debut for Iceland in the 1–2 friendly defeat to the Faroe Islands.

Guðjón joined FH ahead of the 2012 season and played every league game as the club won its first Icelandic league title in three years. In 2015 he returned to Keflavík where he spent a further two seasons before retiring from injury in May 2017.

=== Coaching ===
After retiring from football, Antoníusson took charge of 2. deild karla side Víðir in June 2017. After a successful first season, in which the club finished third in the league, he signed a new one-year contract extension in September 2017.

== Career statistics ==
As of 28 September 2013

Club	Season	Division	League		Cup		Europe		Total	
Club	Season	Division	Apps	Goals	Apps	Goals	Apps	Goals	Apps	Goals
Víðir	2000	2. deild karla	11	1	0	0	–	–	11	1
Keflavík	2001	Úrvalsdeild	0	0	0	0	–	–	0	0
Keflavík	2002	Úrvalsdeild	2	0	1	0	–	–	3	0
Keflavík	2003	1. deild karla	15	1	1	0	–	–	16	1
Keflavík	2004	Úrvalsdeild	17	0	5	0	–	–	22	0
Keflavík	2005	Úrvalsdeild	17	1	2	0	3	0	22	1
Keflavík	2006	Úrvalsdeild	18	0	4	1	4	0	26	1
Keflavík	2007	Úrvalsdeild	18	2	2	0	2	0	22	2
Keflavík	2008	Úrvalsdeild	22	2	3	2	–	–	25	4
Keflavík	2009	Úrvalsdeild	20	2	4	1	2	0	26	3
Keflavík	2010	Úrvalsdeild	21	1	2	0	–	–	23	1
Keflavík	2011	Úrvalsdeild	20	1	2	0	–	–	22	1
FH	2012	Úrvalsdeild	22	6	1	0	4	0	27	6
FH	2013	Úrvalsdeild	5	0	1	0	–	–	6	0
Total			208	17	28	4	15	0	251	21

== Honours ==
Keflavík

- Icelandic Cup: 2004, 2006

FH

- Úrvalsdeild: 2012
