= Haraldur Freyr Guðmundsson =

Icelandic footballer and manager

Haraldur Guðmundsson
Personal information
- Full name: Haraldur Freyr Guðmundsson
- Date of birth: 14 December 1981 (age 44)
- Place of birth: Keflavik, Iceland
- Height: 1.89 m (6 ft 2 in)
- Position: Defender

Youth career
- –1999: Keflavík

Senior career*
| Years | Team | Apps | (Gls) |
| 1999–2004 | Keflavík | 62 | (7) |
| 2005–2009 | Aalesunds FK | 88 | (4) |
| 2009 | Apollon Limassol | 12 | (0) |
| 2009–2011 | Keflavík | 44 | (2) |
| 2011 | Start | 9 | (0) |
| 2012–2016 | Keflavík | 94 | (0) |

International career^{‡}
| 1999 | Iceland U-19 | 4 | (0) |
| 2002–2003 | Iceland U-21 | 8 | (0) |
| 2005 | Iceland | 2 | (0) |
| 2011 | Iceland futsal | 3 | (1) |
- * Club domestic league appearances and goals as of 28 September 2013 ‡ National team caps and goals as of 3 April 2013

Haraldur Freyr Guðmundsson (born 14 December 1981) is an Icelandic retired professional footballer who played as a defender. During his career, Guðmundsson played in Norway for Aalesunds FK and Start; in Cyprus for Apollon Limassol; and had three separate spells with his hometown team Keflavík. He is now manager at Reynir Sandgerði and won the 4 Division 2018 with the club, without losing a single game. In 2020 he promoted Reynir to the 2 division. Two promotions in three years.

== Club career ==
He has played for Cypriot team Apollon Limassol. He joined from Norwegian team Aalesunds FK having played there since 2005, when he joined from Icelandic team Keflavík. On 31 August 2011, he signed with Start. However, he switched back to Keflavík before the 2012 season. He played through Keflavík youth academy and then joined the first team in 1999.

Guðmundsson retired from football at the end of the 2016 season.

== International career ==
He has also played for the Iceland national under-21 football team and twice for the Iceland senior side.
