= 1967 Úrvalsdeild =

Úrvalsdeild
- Season: 1967

Statistics of Úrvalsdeild in the 1967 season.

== Overview ==
It was contested by 6 teams, and Valur won the championship. Valur's Hermann Gunnarsson was the top scorer with 12 goals.

== Final league table ==
Pos	Team	Pld	W	D	L	GF	GA	GD	Pts	Qualification or relegation
1	Valur (C)	10	6	2	2	21	17	+4	14	Qualification for the European Cup first round
2	Fram	10	5	4	1	15	11	+4	14	
3	ÍBA	10	6	1	3	21	11	+10	13	
4	Keflavík	10	3	2	5	9	13	−4	8	
5	KR	10	3	1	6	15	18	−3	7	Qualification for the Cup Winners' Cup first round
6	ÍA (R)	10	2	0	8	10	21	−11	4	Relegation to 1. deild karla

Source: rsssf.com
Rules for classification: 1) points; 2) goal difference; 3) number of goals scored.
(C) Champions; (R) Relegated

== Results ==
Each team played every opponent once home and away for a total of 10 matches.

Home \ Away	FRA	ÍA	ÍBA	ÍBK	KR	VAL
Fram		2–1	0–1	1–1	2–1	2–2
ÍA	1–2		1–5	0–1	1–3	1–2
ÍBA	1–2	4–1		3–1	0–0	2–1
Keflavík	0–0	0–1	2–1		2–0	0–2
KR	2–3	0–2	1–3	1–0		5–1
Valur	1–1	1–0	2–1	4–2	4–2	

Legend: Blue = home team win; Yellow = draw; Red = away team win.
