= 2003 1. deild karla =

Icelandic football league season

The 2003 season of 1. deild karla was the 49th season of second-tier football in Iceland.

== League table ==
Pos	Team	Pld	W	D	L	GF	GA	GD	Pts	Promotion or relegation
1	Keflavík (C, P)	18	13	4	1	51	15	+36	43	Promoted to 2004 Úrvalsdeild
2	Víkingur R. (P)	18	9	8	1	28	15	+13	35	Promoted to 2004 Úrvalsdeild
3	Þór A.	18	10	4	4	47	31	+16	34	
4	Stjarnan	18	6	8	4	30	26	+4	26	
5	Haukar	18	6	4	8	26	32	−6	22	
6	Njarðvík	18	5	6	7	36	35	+1	21	
7	Breiðablik	18	6	3	9	24	27	−3	21	
8	HK	16	6	3	7	27	37	−10	21	
9	Afturelding (R)	18	4	2	12	17	42	−25	14	Relegated to 2004 2. deild
10	Leiftur/Dalvík (R)	18	3	2	13	21	47	−26	11	Relegated to 2004 2. deild

Source: rsssf.com
Rules for classification: 1) points; 2) goal difference; 3) number of goals scored.
(C) Champions; (P) Promoted; (R) Relegated

== Top scorers ==
Scorer	Goals	Team
(Iceland) Jóhann Þórhallsson	15	Þór A.
(Iceland) Þórarinn Brynjar Kristjánsson	14	Keflavík
(Iceland) Magnús Sverrir Þorsteinsson	12	Keflavík
(Iceland) Stefán Örn Arnarson	10	Víkingur R.
(Iceland) Eyþór Guðnason	10	Njarðvík
(Sweden) Zeid Yasin	8	Leiftur/Dalvík
(Iceland) Daníel Hjaltason	8	Víkingur R.
(Iceland) Óskar Örn Hauksson	7	Njarðvík
(Iceland) Brynjar Sverrisson	7	Stjarnan
(Serbia and Montenegro) Zoran Panic	7	HK
(Brazil) Alexandre Barreto dos Santos	7	Þór A.
