= 1970 Úrvalsdeild =

Úrvalsdeild
- Season: 1970

Statistics of Úrvalsdeild in the 1970 season.

== Overview ==
It was contested by 8 teams, and ÍA won the championship. ÍBA's Hermann Gunnarsson was the top scorer with 14 goals.

== Final league table ==
Pos	Team	Pld	W	D	L	GF	GA	GD	Pts	Qualification or relegation
1	ÍA (C)	14	8	4	2	24	15	+9	20	Qualification for the European Cup first round
2	Fram	14	8	0	6	28	19	+9	16 (Note: Fram finished second after winning the UEFA Cup play-off match 3–2 over Keflavík on September 4 at Melavöllur. Fram later qualified for the European Cup Winners' Cup via winning the Icelandic Cup which saw the UEFA Cup berth passed down to third-placed Keflavík.)	Qualification for the Cup Winners' Cup preliminary round
3	Keflavík	14	7	2	5	18	15	+3	16	Qualification for the UEFA Cup first round
4	KR	14	5	4	5	18	16	+2	14	
5	Valur	14	5	4	5	23	24	−1	14	
6	ÍBA	14	4	5	5	32	30	+2	13	
7	ÍBV	14	6	1	7	20	25	−5	13	
8	Víkingur (R)	14	3	0	11	18	37	−19	6	Relegation to 1. deild karla

Source: RSSSF
Rules for classification: 1) points; 2) goal difference; 3) number of goals scored.
(C) Champions; (R) Relegated

== Results ==
Each team played every opponent once home and away for a total of 14 matches.

Home \ Away	FRA	ÍA	ÍBA	ÍBV	ÍBK	KR	VAL	VÍK
Fram		1–2	7–1	0–2	1–2	2–0	1–0	3–2
ÍA	2–0		0–0	4–1	4–2	0–0	2–2	2–0
ÍBA	1–2	1–3		1–1	1–1	6–3	2–2	6–2
ÍBV	0–2	3–0	0–3		2–1	0–2	2–3	2–0
Keflavík	2–1	1–2	1–0	1–0		0–0	2–0	1–0
KR	1–2	1–2	1–1	4–0	2–0		1–1	1–0
Valur	3–1	1–1	6–5	0–1	2–1	0–1		2–1
Víkingur	1–5	2–0	1–4	4–6	0–3	2–1	3–1	

Source: RSSSF
Legend: Blue = home team win; Yellow = draw; Red = away team win.
