= Guðmundur Þórðarson =

Icelandic football coach and former footballer

Personal information
- Date of birth: 2 August 1945 (age 81)
- Position: Forward

Managerial career
- Years: Team
- 1981–83: Iceland

Guðmundur Þórðarson is an Icelandic football coach and former footballer who played for Breiðablik, where he scored 92 goals in 173 appearances. He was the first coach of the Iceland women's national football team.
