= 1997 Icelandic Cup =

Coca-Cola bikar

Tournament details
- Country: Iceland

Final positions
- Champions: Keflavík
- Runners-up: ÍBV

The 1997 Coca-Cola bikar was the 38th season of the Icelandic national football cup. It started on 25 May 1997 and concluded with the final replay on 5 October 1997. The winners qualified for the qualifying round of the 1998–99 UEFA Cup Winners' Cup.

== First round ==
Team 1	Score	Team 2
25 May 1997
Neisti D.	1–5	Höttur
26 May 1997
Víkingur Ó.	2–3	Keflavík U23
KR U23	11–0	ÍH
Valur U23	3–0	Njarðvík
Fram U23	0–1	ÍA U23
27 May 1997
Tindastóll	2–5	Hvöt
Breiðablik U23	3–2 (a.e.t.)	Víkingur U23
Neisti H.	0–2	KS
Leiknir Reykjavík	4–0	GG
HK	5–2	Bruni
KVA	7–2	Leiknir F.
29 May 1997
Fjölnir	3–2	Smástund
Framherjar	6–2	FH U23

== Second round ==
Team 1	Score	Team 2
6 June 1997
KVA	2–3	Þróttur Neskaupstað
7 June 1997
HK	3–1	Selfoss
Reynir Sandgerði	4–1	Ægir
Dalvík	1–0	Nökkvi
Víkingur	7–2	KSÁÁ
Leiknir Reykjavík	5–2	Valur U23
KR U23	4–0	Haukar
Fjölnir	5–3	Bolungarvík
ÍA U23	6–0	Grótta
Stjarnan U23	1–2	Víðir
Breiðablik U23	0–3	Keflavík U23
8 June 1997
Afturelding	3–0	Framherjar
Léttir	0–4	ÍR
Sindri	2–1	Höttur
Völsungur	1–0	Hvöt
Magni Grenivík	0–2	KS

== Third round ==
Team 1	Score	Team 2
14 June 1997
ÍA U23	2–3	ÍA
Víðir	0–1	Grindavík
ÍR	1–2	Keflavík
Dalvík	0–2	FH
Reynir Sandgerði	0–2	Stjarnan
Sindri	1–7	Breiðablik
KR U23	0–4	Fram
Þróttur Neskaupstað	3–4	Þróttur
Leiknir Reykjavík	0–4	ÍBV
15 June 1997
Víkingur	1–2	Skallagrímur
Afturelding	1–3	þór Akureyri
KS	0–4	KR
Völsungur	0–3	Fylkir
Keflavík U23	0–2	Valur
HK	1–4	Leiftur
Fjölnir	0–7	KA

== Fourth round ==
Team 1	Score	Team 2
25 June 1997
Þróttur	2–0	þór Akureyri
Valur	2–0	Fylkir
Grindavík	0–1	Breiðablik
Leiftur	1–0	ÍA
26 June 1997
Keflavík	1–0	Fram
KA	1–6	ÍBV
Stjarnan	1–5	KR
FH	1–2 (a.e.t.)	Skallagrímur

== Quarter-finals ==
Team 1	Score	Team 2
8 July 1997
Leiftur	6–3	Þróttur
ÍBV	8–1	Breiðablik
10 July 1997
Skallagrímur	1–5	KR
Valur	1–5	Keflavík

== Semi-finals ==
Team 1	Score	Team 2
9 August 1997
ÍBV	3–0	KR
10 August 1997
Keflavík	1–0 (a.e.t.)	Leiftur

== Final ==
31 August 1997

Keflavík	1–1 (a.e.t.)	ÍBV
Gylfason 120'		Hafsteinsson 99'

Laugardalsvollur, Reykjavík
Referee: Sæmundur Víglundsson

=== Replay ===
5 October 1997

Keflavík	0–0 (a.e.t.)	ÍBV
Penalties
Hauksson (penalty scored); J. B. Guðmundsson (penalty scored); Finnbogason (penalty missed); Gylfason (penalty scored); Oddsson (penalty scored); Guðbrandsson (penalty scored)	5–4	(penalty scored) Sverrisson; (penalty missed) T. Guðmundsson; (penalty scored) Miljković; (penalty scored) Bjarklind; (penalty scored) Lárusson; (penalty missed) Ólafsson

Laugardalsvollur, Reykjavík
Referee: Sæmundur Víglundsson
