= 1994 Úrvalsdeild =

Úrvalsdeild
- Season: 1994

Statistics of Úrvalsdeild in the 1994 season.

== Overview ==
It was contested by 10 teams, and ÍA won the championship. ÍA's Mihajlo Biberčić was the top scorer with 14 goals.

== Final league table ==
Pos	Team	Pld	W	D	L	GF	GA	GD	Pts	Qualification or relegation
1	ÍA (C)	18	12	3	3	35	11	+24	39	Qualification for the UEFA Cup preliminary round
2	FH	18	11	3	4	26	16	+10	36	Qualification for the UEFA Cup preliminary round
3	Keflavík	18	8	7	3	36	24	+12	31	Qualification for the Intertoto Cup group stage
4	Valur	18	8	4	6	25	25	0	28	
5	KR	18	7	6	5	28	20	+8	27	Qualification for the Cup Winners' Cup qualifying round
6	Fram	18	4	8	6	27	30	−3	20	
7	Breiðablik	18	6	2	10	23	35	−12	20	
8	ÍBV	18	4	7	7	22	29	−7	19	
9	Þór (R)	18	3	5	10	27	38	−11	14	Relegation to 1. deild karla
10	Stjarnan (R)	18	2	5	11	18	39	−21	11	Relegation to 1. deild karla

Source: RSSSF
Rules for classification: 1) points; 2) goal difference; 3) number of goals scored.
(C) Champions; (R) Relegated

== Results ==
Each team played every opponent once home and away for a total of 18 matches.

Home \ Away	BRE	FH	FRA	ÍA	ÍBV	ÍBK	KR	STJ	VAL	ÞÓR
Breiðablik		3–4	2–2	0–1	2–0	1–3	0–5	1–2	2–0	1–1
FH	1–0		1–2	0–0	2–1	2–1	1–2	4–1	0–1	1–0
Fram	2–1	1–2		1–2	2–2	1–2	0–3	0–0	3–0	1–1
ÍA	6–0	0–0	2–0		5–1	0–2	1–2	3–0	2–1	2–1
ÍBV	1–0	0–1	2–2	0–2		2–1	1–0	1–2	1–1	6–1
Keflavík	4–0	1–2	2–2	2–1	0–0		2–2	4–1	3–3	2–1
KR	0–1	0–1	3–3	0–0	1–1	1–1		2–0	0–0	3–2
Stjarnan	1–3	1–1	1–2	1–4	2–2	1–1	0–2		1–3	2–3
Valur	1–3	1–0	1–0	0–1	5–1	1–1	2–0	3–2		1–0
Þór	1–3	1–3	3–3	0–3	0–0	3–4	4–2	0–0	5–1	

Legend: Blue = home team win; Yellow = draw; Red = away team win.

== Top goalscorers ==
Rank	Player	Club	Goals
1	(Federal Republic of Yugoslavia) Mihajlo Biberčić	ÍA	14
2	(Iceland) Bjarni Guðmundsson	Þór	11
2	(Iceland) Oli Þór Magnússon	Keflavík	11
4	(Iceland) Hörður Magnússon	FH	10
4	(Iceland) Ragnar Margeirsson	Keflavík	10
6	(Iceland) Ríkharður Daðason	Fram	9
6	(Iceland) Helgi Sigurðsson	Fram	9
8	(Iceland) Sumarliði Arnarson	ÍBV	8
9	(Iceland) Eiður Guðjohnsen	Valur	7
9	(Iceland) Leifur Geir Hafsteinsson	Stjarnan	7
