= Óli Valur Ómarsson =

Icelandic footballer

Personal information
- Date of birth: 9 January 2003 (age 23)
- Place of birth: Iceland
- Height: 1.52 m (5 ft 0 in)
- Position: Right-back

Team information
- Current team: Breiðablik
- Number: 9

Youth career
- –2015: Álftanes
- 2015–2021: Stjarnan

Senior career*
Years	Team	Apps	(Gls)
2019–2022	Stjarnan	37	(1)
2022–2024	Sirius	15	(0)
2024	→ Stjarnan (loan)	22	(5)
2025–	Breiðablik	47	(5)

International career^{‡}
2017–2018	Iceland U15	5	(1)
2019	Iceland U16	2	(0)
2019–2020	Iceland U17	4	(0)
2021–2022	Iceland U19	9	(0)
2022–	Iceland U21	6	(0)
- * Club domestic league appearances and goals as of 1 November 2026 ‡ National team caps and goals as of 7 May 2023

Óli Valur Ómarsson (born 9 January 2003) is an Icelandic footballer who plays as a right-back for Breiðablik.

== Club career ==
He made his debut for Stjarnan as a substitute against ÍBV in the last round of the 2019 season, aged 16. After establishing himself with Stjarnan he was sold to Sirius on 13 July 2022, signing a 5-year contract and making his Allsvenskan debut coming on as a substitute against Degerfors on 17 July 2022.

== International career ==
He has featured for the Icelandic U15, U16, U17, U19 and U21 youth sides.
