= Joe Hooley =

English football manager (1938–2021)

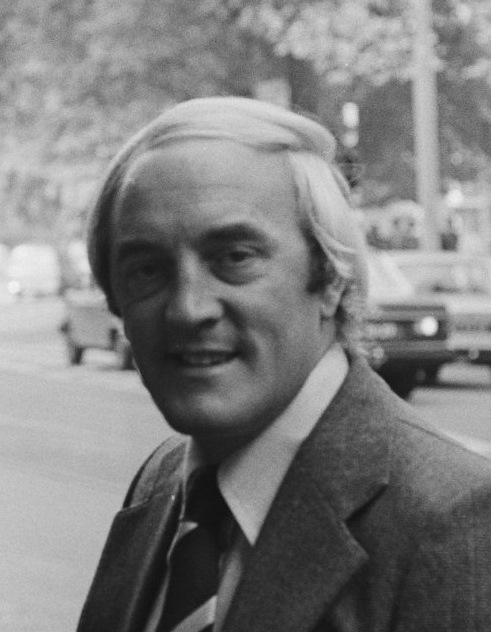
- Hooley in 1977

Personal information
- Full name: Joseph Hooley
- Date of birth: 26 December 1938
- Place of birth: Hoyland, England
- Date of death: January 2021 (aged 82)
- Place of death: Barnsley, England
- Position: Winger

Youth career
- Barnsley

Senior career*
Years	Team	Apps	(Gls)
1956–1957	Barnsley	1	(0)
1957–1958	Sheffield United	0	(0)
1958–1959	Workington	6	(2)
1958-1959	Cambridge City	9	(9)
1959-1960	Holbeach United		
1960	Bradford Park Avenue	13	(4)
1960–1961	Bedford Town		
1961–1962	Accrington Stanley		
1962-19xx	Dover Town		

Managerial career
- 1973: Keflavík
- 1974: Molde FK
- 1975: Keflavík
- 1977–1979: Lillestrøm
- 1981: Bodø/Glimt
- 1984: Molde FK
- 1986: Skeid Fotball
- 1994: Åndalsnes IF
- * Club domestic league appearances and goals

Joseph Hooley (26 December 1938 – January 2021) was an English football player and manager.

A winger, he played for Barnsley, Sheffield United, Workington, Cambridge City, Holbeach United, Bradford Park Avenue, Bedford Town, Accrington Stanley and Dover Town.

After his retirement as a player, Hooley worked several years as a manager in Norway and Iceland, most notably guiding Lillestrøm to the Norwegian League and Cup Double in 1977. He also managed Keflavík, Molde FK, and Bodø/Glimt.
