= Viktor Karl Einarsson =

Icelandic footballer

Personal information
- Date of birth: 30 January 1997 (age 29)
- Place of birth: Kópavogur, Iceland
- Height: 1.76 m (5 ft 9 in)
- Position: Midfielder

Team information
- Current team: Breiðablik
- Number: 8

Youth career
- –2013: Breiðablik
- 2013–2016: AZ Alkmaar

Senior career*
Years	Team	Apps	(Gls)
2016–2018	Jong AZ	45	(3)
2018	IFK Värnamo	14	(0)
2019–	Breiðablik	173	(31)

International career^{‡}
2013	Iceland U-16	7	(1)
2014	Iceland U-17	8	(2)
2014–2016	Iceland U-19	7	(0)
2017	Iceland U-21	8	(2)
2022–	Iceland	4	(0)
- * Club domestic league appearances and goals as of 1 November 2026 ‡ National team caps and goals as of 15:56, 11 November 2022

Viktor Karl Einarsson (born 30 January 1997) is an Icelandic footballer who plays for Breiðablik.

== Club career ==
He made his Eerste Divisie debut for Jong AZ on 18 August 2017 in a game against FC Den Bosch and scored on his debut.

On 24 July 2018, Viktor joined IFK Värnamo in Superettan, Sweden's second tier.
