= 2008 Icelandic Cup =

Visa-Bikar

Tournament details
- Country: Iceland

Final positions
- Champions: KR
- Runners-up: Fjölnir

The 2008 Visa-Bikar was the 49th season of the Icelandic national football cup. It started on 24 May 2008 and concluded with the final held on 4 October 2008. The winners qualified for the second qualifying round of the 2009–10 UEFA Europa League.

== First round ==
The First Round consisted of 32 teams from lower Icelandic divisions. The matches were played between 24 and 27 May 2008.

Team 1	Score	Team 2
24 May 2008
Höfrungur	0–4	Skallagrímur
Garðabæjar	0–1	Augnablik
UMF Snæfell	0–3	UMF Grundarfjarðar
26 May 2008
Völsungur	1–3	Magni
UMF Tindastóll	2–1	Kormáks
Vesturbæjar	3–4	Ýmir
Þróttur Vogum	3–1	UMF Gnúpverja
Ægir	1–2	Elliði
Reyðarfjörður	4–3	Boltafélag Norðfjarðar
UMF Hrunamanna	0–4	Árborgar
Berserkir	3–0	UMF Kjalnesinga
27 May 2008
Leiknir Fáskrúðsfirði	1–3	Spyrnir
Hvíti riddarinn	3–2 (a.e.t.)	UMF Laugdæla
UMF Álftanes	1–3	Hamrarnir/Vinir
Rangæinga	2–4	Breiðholts
Dalvík/Reynir	0–1	UMF Hvöt

== Second round ==
The Second Round included 16 winners from the previous round as well as 24 teams from second and third division. The matches were played between 1 and 3 June 2008.

Team 1	Score	Team 2
1 June 2008
Framherjar-Smástund	2–0	Ýmir
2 June 2008
Þór Akureyri	1–0 (a.e.t.)	KS/Leiftur
Reyðarfjörður	0–17	Fjarðabyggðar
UMF Sindri	6–0	Spyrnir
Hafnarfjarðar	2–4	Stjarnan
Skallagrímur	1–4	Selfoss
Hamrarnir/Vinir	1–7	UMF Hamar
Víkingur	0–1	Grótta
Elliði	2–3	Reynir Sandgerði
Þróttur Vogum	3–0	Hvíti riddarinn
UMF Tindastóll	0–5	UMF Hvöt
Leiknir Reykjavík	8–4	Augnablik
3 June 2008
Höttur	5–1	Huginn
Njarðvík	0–2	Breiðholts
Víkingur Reykjavík	1–0	UMF Afturelding
ÍBV	3–2 (a.e.t.)	ÍR
UMF Grundarfjarðar	1–5	Berserkir
Víðir	6–0	Árborgar
Haukar	12–0	Afríka
Magni	0–3	KA

== Third round ==
At this point in the competition entered 12 clubs from Úrvalsdeild (first level). The matches were played on 18 and 19 June 2008.

Team 1	Score	Team 2
18 June 2008
Víkingur Reykjavík	1–0	Grótta
HK	1–0	ÍA
Víðir	1–0	Þróttur Vogum
ÍBV	2–0	Leiknir Reykjavík
Haukar	2–1	Berserkir
Grindavík	2–1	Höttur
Þróttur Reykjavík	2–2 (a.e.t.); 2−4 (pen)	Fylkir
Reynir Sandgerði	3–0	UMF Sindri
19 June 2008
Breiðablik	1–0	KA
Fjarðabyggð	0–2	FH
UMF Hamar	2–1	Selfoss
Fram	2–1	UMF Hvöt
Fjölnir	6–0	Framherjar-Smástund
Þór Akureyri	0–1	Valur
Keflavík	2–1	Stjarnan
KR	1–0	Breiðholts

== Fourth round ==
The matches were played on 2 and 3 July 2008.

Team 1	Score	Team 2
2 July 2008
Haukar	1–0	HK
Víðir	1–4	Fylkir
Reynir Sandgerði	1–2	Grindavík
Víkingur Reykjavík	3–0	UMF Hamar
Fjölnir	2–1 (a.e.t.)	ÍBV
3 July 2008
Keflavík	3–1	FH
KR	2–0	Fram
Breiðablik	1–0	Valur

== Quarter-finals ==
The matches were played on 24 July 2008.

Team 1	Score	Team 2
24 July 2008
KR	3–2	Grindavík
Breiðablik	3–2	Keflavík
Fjölnir	1–0	Víkingur Reykjavík
Haukar	0–1 (a.e.t.)	Fylkir

== Semi-finals ==
31 August 2008

Fylkir	3–4	Fjölnir
Breiðdal 30'; Hannesson 37'; Jeffs 69'		Guðmundsson 17'; Gíslason 41' (o.g.); Markan 43'; Leifsson 90'

Laugardalsvöllur, Reykjavík
Attendance: 1,709
Referee: Valgeir Valgeirsson

1 September 2008

Breiðablik	1–1 (a.e.t.)	KR
Baldvinsson 96'		Marteinsson 103'
Penalties
	1–4

Laugardalsvöllur, Reykjavík
Attendance: 3,026
Referee: Johannes Valgeirsson

== Final ==
4 October 2008
14:00 GMT

KR	1–0	Fjölnir
Hauksson 89' (o.g.)

Laugardalsvöllur, Reykjavík
Attendance: 4,524
Referee: Magnús Þórisson
