= Ástráður Gunnarsson =

Icelandic footballer

Personal information
- Date of birth: 30 March 1948 (age 78)
- Place of birth: Iceland
- Position: Defender

Senior career*
Years	Team	Apps	(Gls)
1968–1976	Keflavík	74	(0)

International career
1973–1974	Iceland	8	(0)

Managerial career
- 1989: Keflavík
- * Club domestic league appearances and goals

Ástráður Gunnarsson (born 30 March 1948) is an Icelandic former footballer who played as a defender. He won eight caps for the Iceland national football team between 1973 and 1974.
