= Ragnar Margeirsson =

Icelandic footballer

Personal information
- Full name: Ragnar Ingi Margeirsson
- Date of birth: 14 August 1962
- Place of birth: Keflavík, Iceland
- Date of death: 10 February 2002 (aged 39)
- Position: Forward

Senior career*
Years	Team	Apps	(Gls)
1979–1980	Keflavík	32	(9)
1980–1981	FC Homburg	14	(1)
1981–1982	Gent	1	(0)
1982	Keflavík	12	(4)
1982–1983	Cercle Brugge	14	(1)
1983–1985	Keflavík	44	(18)
1985–1987	Thor Waterschei	40	(10)
1987	Fram Reykjavik	12	(4)
1987–1988	1860 Munich	2	(0)
1988	Keflavík	17	(5)
1989	Fram Reykjavik	14	(5)
1989–1990	Sturm Graz	6	(1)
1990–1993	KR Reykjavik	51	(25)
1994–1996	Keflavík	42	(13)
Total		301	(96)

International career
1981–1992	Iceland	46	(5)
- * Club domestic league appearances and goals

Ragnar Ingi Margeirsson (14 August 1962 – 10 February 2002) was an Icelandic professional footballer who played as a forward.

== Club career ==
Ragnar started his career at Keflavík before moving abroad to play for several clubs in Belgium, Germany and Austria. He returned to Iceland to finish his career at the same side where he started.

== International career ==
Ragnar made his debut for Iceland in an August 1981 friendly match against Nigeria and went on to collect 46 caps, scoring 5 goals. He played his last international match in an October 1992 World Cup qualifying match against Russia.
