= 1964 Úrvalsdeild =

Úrvalsdeild
- Season: 1964

Statistics of Úrvalsdeild in the 1964 season.

== Overview ==
It was contested by 6 teams, and Keflavík won the championship. ÍA's Eyleifur Hafsteinsson was the top scorer with 10 goals.

== Final league table ==
Pos	Team	Pld	W	D	L	GF	GA	GD	Pts	Qualification or relegation
1	Keflavík (C)	10	6	3	1	25	13	+12	15	Qualification for the European Cup preliminary round
2	ÍA	10	6	0	4	27	21	+6	12	
3	KR	10	4	3	3	16	15	+1	11	Qualification for the Cup Winners' Cup first round
4	Valur	10	3	2	5	19	24	−5	8	
5	Fram	10	2	3	5	16	20	−4	7	Qualification for the relegation play-offs
6	Þróttur (R)	10	2	3	5	14	24	−10	7	Qualification for the relegation play-offs

Source: rsssf.com
Rules for classification: 1) points; 2) goal difference; 3) number of goals scored.
(C) Champions; (R) Relegated

== Results ==
Each team played every opponent once home and away for a total of 10 matches.

Home \ Away	FRA	ÍA	ÍBK	KR	VAL	ÞRÓ
Fram		2–3	0–0	0–0	0–0	1–0
ÍA	1–4		1–3	4–2	3–1	3–1
Keflavík	6–5	2–0		1–1	5–1	0–0
KR	1–0	1–4	3–2		0–1	4–0
Valur	7–3	3–1	1–4	1–2		2–2
Þróttur	2–1	2–7	1–2	2–2	4–2	

Legend: Blue = home team win; Yellow = draw; Red = away team win.

== Relegation play-offs ==
The match was played on 19 September 1964.

Team 1	Score	Team 2
Fram	4–1	Þróttur
