= Keflavíkurvöllur =

Multi-use stadium in Iceland

(Iceland) Keflavíkurvöllur
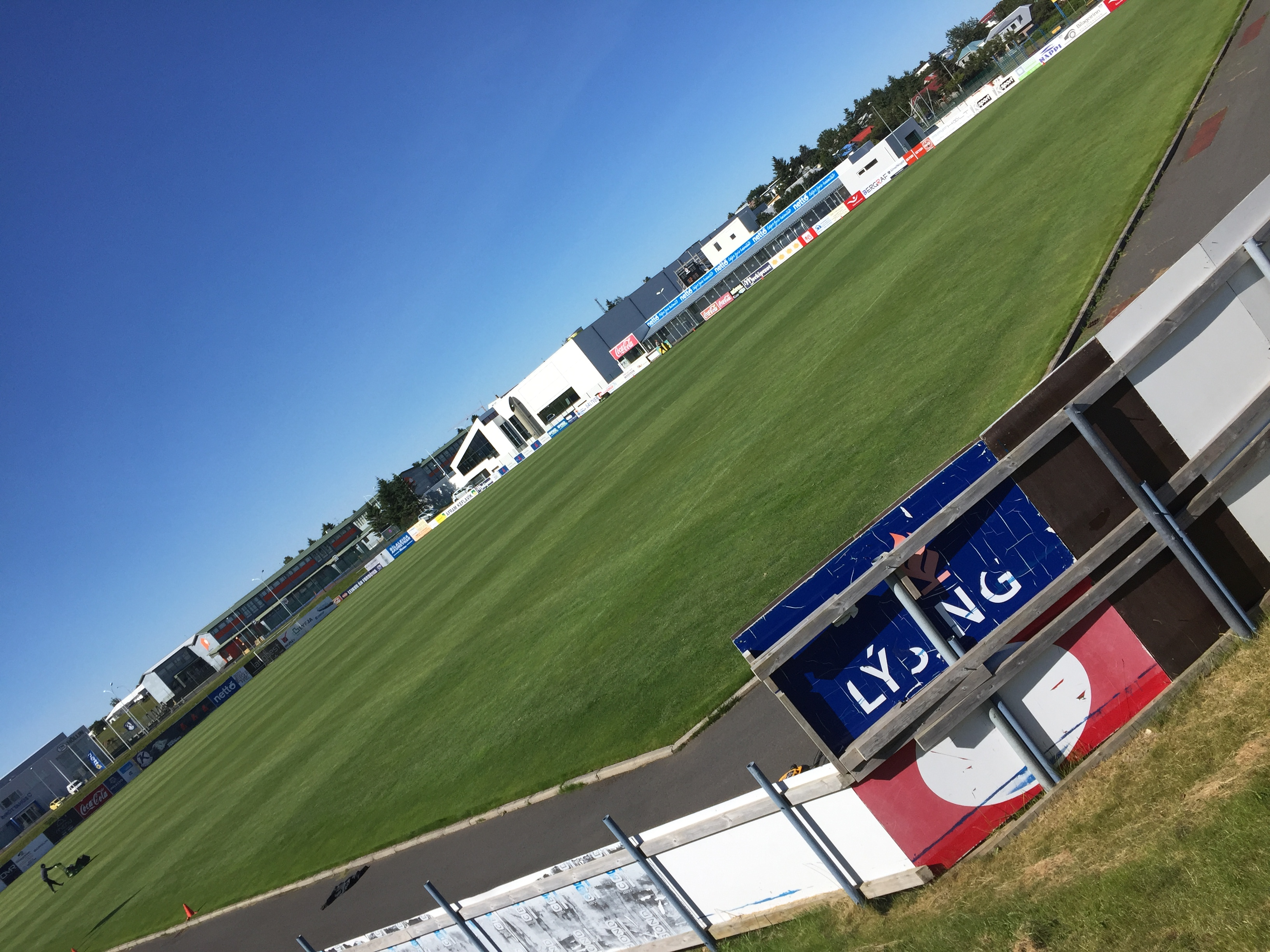
- Interactive map of (Iceland) Keflavíkurvöllur
- Location: Keflavík, Iceland
- Coordinates: 63.9979642°N 22.5611633°W
- Capacity: 4,000

Tenant
- Keflavík

Keflavíkurvöllur (Icelandic pronunciation: [ˈcʰɛplaˌviːkʏrˌvœtlʏr̥], lit. 'Keflavik Field' or more precisely 'Keflavik Stadium') is a multi-use stadium in Keflavík, Iceland. It is currently used mostly for football matches. Keflavík Football Club plays there. The stadium holds 4,000. The stadium is currently called HS-Orku völlurinn.

In October 2009 the grass had to be changed because of its poor condition; if it rained, the grass would change into mud in only a short time.
