= 1975 Úrvalsdeild =

Season of the Icelandic Premier League

Úrvalsdeild
- Season: 1975

Statistics of Úrvalsdeild in the 1975 season.

== Overview ==
It was contested by 8 teams, and ÍA won the championship. ÍA's Matthías Hallgrímsson was the top scorer with 10 goals.

== Final league table ==
Pos	Team	Pld	W	D	L	GF	GA	GD	Pts	Qualification or relegation
1	ÍA (C)	14	8	3	3	29	14	+15	19	Qualification for the European Cup first round
2	Fram	14	8	1	5	20	17	+3	17	Qualification for the UEFA Cup first round
3	Valur	14	6	4	4	20	17	+3	16	
4	Víkingur	14	6	3	5	17	12	+5	15	
5	Keflavík	14	4	5	5	13	13	0	13	Qualification for the Cup Winners' Cup first round
6	FH	14	4	5	5	11	21	−10	13	
7	KR	14	3	4	7	13	18	−5	10	
8	ÍBV (R)	14	2	5	7	11	22	−11	9	Qualification for the relegation play-offs

Source: RSSSF
Rules for classification: 1) points; 2) goal difference; 3) number of goals scored.
(C) Champions; (R) Relegated

== Results ==
Each team played every opponent once home and away for a total of 14 matches.

Home \ Away	FH	FRA	ÍA	ÍBV	ÍBK	KR	VAL	VÍK
FH		1–0	1–0	0–0	1–1	1–0	0–3	0–2
Fram	2–0		3–6	1–0	1–1	2–0	2–3	1–0
ÍA	7–1	2–2		4–0	1–0	0–0	2–1	1–1
ÍBV	1–1	2–0	3–2		0–1	1–2	1–2	0–0
Keflavík	2–2	0–1	1–2	0–0		1–0	0–0	0–1
KR	1–1	2–3	0–1	1–0	2–4		0–0	2–0
Valur	1–2	1–3	1–0	2–2	1–2	2–2		1–0
Víkingur	1–0	0–1	2–2	6–1	1–0	2–1	1–2	

Source: RSSSF
Legend: Blue = home team win; Yellow = draw; Red = away team win.

== Relegation play-offs ==
The match was played on 2 September 1975.

Team 1	Score	Team 2
Þróttur	2–0	ÍBV

Source: RSSSF
