= Guðni Kjartansson =

Icelandic footballer and manager

Personal information
- Date of birth: 10 December 1946 (age 79)
- Place of birth: Iceland
- Position: Defender

Senior career*
Years	Team	Apps	(Gls)
1965–1978	Keflavík		

International career
1967–1973	Iceland	31	(0)

Managerial career
- 1975: Keflavík
- 1976: Keflavík
- 1978: Keflavík
- 1979: Keflavík
- 1980–1981: Iceland
- 1981: Keflavík
- 1983: Keflavík
- 1989: Iceland
- 1991: KR
- * Club domestic league appearances and goals

Guðni Kjartansson (born 10 December 1946) is an Icelandic football manager and former player, who played as a defender. He managed the Iceland national team from 1980 to 1981.

In recognition of his outstanding contributions to sports and education, Guðni was awarded the Knight's Cross of the Icelandic Order of the Falcon in 2020.
