= Baldvin Baldvinsson =

Icelandic former footballer

Personal information
- Full name: Baldvin Baldvinsson
- Date of birth: 29 June 1943
- Place of birth: Iceland
- Date of death: 15 December 1989 (aged 46)
- Position: Midfielder

Senior career*
Years	Team	Apps	(Gls)
- Fram
1965–1976	KR		

International career
1965–1971	Iceland	4	(1)
- * Club domestic league appearances and goals

Baldvin Baldvinsson (29 June 1943 – 15 December 1989) is an Icelandic former footballer who played as a midfielder. He won four caps for the Iceland national football team between 1965 and 1971. He spent his entire domestic playing career with KR.

Baldvin won his first international cap on 6 July 1965 and scored the Iceland goal in a 1–3 defeat to Denmark. Over the next six years, he played three more matches for his country, and made his final appearance in the 0–0 draw with France on 12 May 1971.

== Personal life ==
Baldvinsson was born on 29 June 1943 to Baldvin Baldvinsson (died 1987) and Þrúði Finnbogadóttir.

He had two children out of wedlock who both died young. His daughter Heba died at age 5 after complications from heart surgery, while his son Baldvin Þór died at the age of 2 due to an accident. Afterwards he married Monika Helgadóttir in 1976 with whom he had two daughters, Þórunn born on 27 July 1975 and Hrönn born on 8 November 1983. He and his wife got divorced before his death.

Baldvinsson died of a heart attack on 15 December 1989 at the age of 46.

== International goals ==
Goal	Date	Venue	Opponent	Result
1.	6 July 1965	Laugardalsvöllur, Reykjavík	Denmark	1–3
