= 1973 Úrvalsdeild =

Úrvalsdeild
- Season: 1973

Statistics of Úrvalsdeild in the 1973 season.

== Overview ==
It was contested by 8 teams, and Keflavík won the championship. Valur's Hermann Gunnarsson was the top scorer with 17 goals.

== Final league table ==
Pos	Team	Pld	W	D	L	GF	GA	GD	Pts	Qualification or relegation
1	Keflavík (C)	14	12	2	0	33	9	+24	26	Qualification for the European Cup first round
2	Valur	14	9	3	2	34	20	+14	21	Qualification for the UEFA Cup first round
3	ÍBV	14	8	1	5	27	19	+8	17	
4	Fram	14	5	2	7	18	23	−5	12	Qualification for the Cup Winners' Cup first round
5	ÍA	14	4	3	7	32	27	+5	11	
6	ÍBA	14	4	3	7	15	29	−14	11	
7	KR	14	3	3	8	17	27	−10	9	
8	Breiðablik (R)	14	1	3	10	23	45	−22	5	Relegation to 1. deild karla

Source: RSSSF
Rules for classification: 1) points; 2) goal difference; 3) number of goals scored.
(C) Champions; (R) Relegated

== Results ==
Each team played every opponent once home and away for a total of 14 matches.

Home \ Away	BRE	FRA	ÍA	ÍBA	ÍBV	ÍBK	KR	VAL
Breiðablik		1–2	3–3	4–0	1–3	0–3	1–1	1–3
Fram	2–1		3–2	0–0	0–1	0–1	3–1	2–2
ÍA	10–1	3–1		0–2	1–0	1–2	1–1	0–1
ÍBA	3–1	3–1	2–6		1–6	0–0	2–1	1–2
ÍBV	3–2	1–0	1–0	4–0		0–1	6–3	1–1
Keflavík	4–4	3–1	4–1	1–0	1–0		2–0	4–0
KR	2–0	0–2	3–1	1–1	2–1	2–3		0–2
Valur	6–3	4–1	3–3	2–0	6–0	0–4	2–0	

Source: RSSSF
Legend: Blue = home team win; Yellow = draw; Red = away team win.
