= 1974 Úrvalsdeild =

Úrvalsdeild
- Season: 1974

Following are the results of the Úrvalsdeild, the top tier of the Icelandic football pyramid, in the 1974 season.

== Overview ==
It was contested by 8 teams, and ÍA won the championship. ÍA's Teitur Þórðarson was the top scorer with 9 goals.

== Final league table ==
Pos	Team	Pld	W	D	L	GF	GA	GD	Pts	Qualification or relegation
1	ÍA (C)	14	9	5	0	24	10	+14	23	Qualification for the European Cup first round
2	Keflavík	14	7	5	2	24	12	+12	19	Qualification for the UEFA Cup first round
3	Valur	14	4	6	4	18	18	0	14	Qualification for the Cup Winners' Cup first round
4	ÍBV	14	3	7	4	20	20	0	13	
5	KR	14	4	5	5	16	19	−3	13	
6	Fram	14	3	6	5	19	20	−1	12	
7	Víkingur	14	2	5	7	14	19	−5	9	Qualification for the relegation play-offs
8	ÍBA (R)	14	3	3	8	16	33	−17	9	Qualification for the relegation play-offs

Source: rsssf.com
Rules for classification: 1) points; 2) goal difference; 3) number of goals scored.
(C) Champions; (R) Relegated

== Results ==
Each team played every opponent once home and away for a total of 14 matches.

Home \ Away	FRA	ÍA	ÍBA	ÍBV	ÍBK	KR	VAL	VÍK
Fram		1–1	2–3	1–1	0–1	1–1	2–1	1–2
ÍA	3–1		4–0	2–1	3–1	1–1	0–0	2–1
ÍBA	1–4	1–1		0–3	0–2	3–2	0–1	0–2
ÍBV	2–2	1–2	5–3		1–3	0–0	1–0	1–1
Keflavík	2–1	1–1	3–0	1–1		5–1	0–0	0–0
KR	0–0	1–2	0–1	2–0	1–0		2–2	3–1
Valur	2–2	0–1	3–3	2–2	1–3	2–0		2–1
Víkingur	0–1	0–1	1–1	1–1	2–2	1–2	1–2	

Legend: Blue = home team win; Yellow = draw; Red = away team win.

== Relegation play-offs ==
The match was played on 5 October 1974.

Team 1	Score	Team 2
Víkingur	3–1	ÍBA
