= 1977 Úrvalsdeild =

Iceland soccer championship

Úrvalsdeild
- Season: 1977

Statistics of Úrvalsdeild in the 1977 season.

== Overview ==
It was contested by 10 teams, and ÍA won the championship. ÍA's Pétur Pétursson was the top scorer with 16 goals.

== Final league table ==
Pos	Team	Pld	W	D	L	GF	GA	GD	Pts	Qualification or relegation
1	ÍA (C)	18	13	2	3	35	13	+22	28	Qualification for the European Cup first round
2	Valur	18	11	5	2	38	18	+20	27	Qualification for the Cup Winners' Cup first round
3	ÍBV	18	9	3	6	27	18	+9	21	Qualification for the UEFA Cup first round
4	Keflavík	18	8	4	6	29	28	+1	20	
5	Víkingur	18	6	8	4	22	23	−1	20	
6	Breiðablik	18	7	4	7	27	26	+1	18	
7	FH	18	5	6	7	26	30	−4	16	
8	Fram	18	4	6	8	24	35	−11	14	
9	KR (R)	18	3	4	11	24	34	−10	10	Relegation to 1. deild karla
10	Þór (R)	18	2	2	14	21	48	−27	6	Relegation to 1. deild karla

Source: RSSSF
Rules for classification: 1) points; 2) goal difference; 3) number of goals scored.
(C) Champions; (R) Relegated

== Results ==
Each team played every opponent once home and away for a total of 18 matches.

Home \ Away	BRE	FH	FRA	ÍA	ÍBV	ÍBK	KR	VAL	VÍK	ÞÓR
Breiðablik		1–1	4–1	1–0	1–3	1–1	1–2	4–3	1–1	0–1
FH	0–2		0–3	0–0	2–0	1–2	5–4	1–1	1–4	5–2
Fram	1–4	1–4		1–2	0–2	3–2	1–1	0–0	0–1	3–1
ÍA	2–0	1–0	4–2		3–0	4–1	1–0	1–4	1–1	3–0
ÍBV	0–0	4–1	3–0	0–1		3–2	2–0	0–1	2–2	2–1
Keflavík	3–2	0–0	2–2	0–4	1–0		4–2	1–2	3–0	3–2
KR	1–2	2–2	1–1	0–2	1–2	0–2		0–3	0–2	6–0
Valur	3–0	1–0	3–3	0–2	2–0	0–0	2–1		4–0	4–2
Víkingur	2–0	1–1	0–1	0–3	0–0	1–0	0–0	3–3		3–2
Þór	1–3	1–2	1–1	3–1	0–4	1–2	2–3	0–2	1–1	

Source: RSSSF
Legend: Blue = home team win; Yellow = draw; Red = away team win.
