= 1969 Úrvalsdeild =

Úrvalsdeild
- Season: 1969

Statistics of Úrvalsdeild in the 1969 season.

== Overview ==
It was contested by 7 teams, and Keflavík won the championship. ÍA's Matthías Hallgrímsson was the top scorer with 9 goals.

== Final league table ==
Pos	Team	Pld	W	D	L	GF	GA	GD	Pts	Qualification
1	Keflavík (C)	12	7	1	4	20	12	+8	15	Qualification for the European Cup first round
2	ÍA	12	6	2	4	22	19	+3	14	Qualification for the Inter-Cities Fairs Cup first round
3	KR	12	4	4	4	24	20	+4	12	
4	ÍBV	12	3	6	3	20	20	0	12	
5	Valur	12	4	4	4	18	19	−1	12	
6	Fram	12	2	6	4	8	16	−8	10	
7	ÍBA	12	2	5	5	12	18	−6	9	Qualification for the Cup Winners' Cup first round

Source: RSSSF
Rules for classification: 1) points; 2) goal difference; 3) number of goals scored.
(C) Champions

== Results ==
Each team played every opponent once home and away for a total of 12 matches.

Home \ Away	FRA	ÍA	ÍBA	ÍBV	ÍBK	KR	VAL
Fram		2–2	1–1	1–1	0–1	1–6	1–0
ÍA	0–1		3–1	2–1	2–1	4–0	2–3
ÍBA	1–1	1–2		1–2	1–0	2–1	2–2
ÍBV	0–0	2–3	1–1		3–2	3–3	1–1
Keflavík	2–0	1–1	2–0	2–4		2–1	2–0
KR	0–0	3–1	2–0	1–1	0–3		6–2
Valur	2–0	3–0	1–1	3–1	0–2	1–1	

Source: RSSSF
Legend: Blue = home team win; Yellow = draw; Red = away team win.
