= Guðmundur Steinarsson =

Icelandic footballer

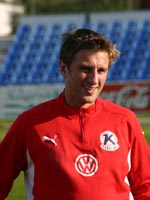

Personal information
- Date of birth: 20 October 1979 (age 47)
- Place of birth: Iceland
- Height: 1.80 m (5 ft 11 in)
- Position: Striker

Team information
- Current team: Fjölnir (assistant manager)

Youth career
- 1990–1995: Keflavík

Senior career*
Years	Team	Apps	(Gls)
1996–2002	Keflavík	82	(28)
1999	→ KA Akureyri (loan)	17	(4)
2002–2004	Brønshøj BK	15	(5)
2003	→ Fram Reykjavik (loan)	11	(0)
2004–2009	Keflavík	87	(36)
2009	FC Vaduz	12	(2)
2009–2012	Keflavík	74	(17)
2013–2015	Njarðvík	0	(0)

International career
1995–1996	Iceland U17	8	(2)
1997	Iceland U19	4	(0)
2000–2001	Iceland U21	7	(1)
2002–2008	Iceland	3	(0)
2011	Iceland futsal	3	(2)

Managerial career
- 2016–: Fjölnir (assistant manager)
- * Club domestic league appearances and goals

Guðmundur Steinarsson (born 20 October 1979) is an Icelandic international former footballer who played as a striker. Steinarsson is currently assistant manager at Fjölnir. He spent the majority of his playing career with Keflavík, where he started his career in 1996, playing more than 250 league games for the club. Guðmundur has also had spells in Denmark and Switzerland with Brønshøj BK and FC Vaduz.

== Career ==
=== Club career ===
Guðmundur began his career in 1996 with Keflavík, and went on to score 28 goals in 82 league matches over the following six years. During the 1999 season, he had a spell on loan at KA Akureyri. Guðmundur left Keflavík in July 2002 in order to move to Denmark to play with Brønshøj BK. He played 15 matches for the Danish club, and spent the 2003 campaign on loan in Iceland with Fram Reykjavik. After two years away, he rejoined Keflavík in 2004 and spent a further five seasons with the club, making a further 105 first-team appearances and scoring 45 goals. In the 2008 season, he was named Players' Player of the Year in the Icelandic league.

On 16 January 2009, Guðmundur signed for FC Vaduz and scored on his debut for the club in the 1–1 draw with FC Aarau. Over the following four months, he played 12 league games for Vaduz before leaving Liechtenstein in the summer of 2009. He subsequently rejoined his former club, Keflavík in July of that year and spent another four seasons with the Úrvalsdeild side, scoring 17 goals in 74 league matches. By the time he left Keflavík at the end of the 2012 campaign, he had become the club's all-time top appearance maker and goalscorer in top-division football with 81 goals in 255 matches. On 17 January 2013, it was announced that he had agreed to play for 2. deild karla outfit Njarðvík for the 2013 season.

=== International career ===
Guðmundur was capped three times playing for Iceland. He made his debut in a friendly match against Brazil on 8 March 2002, where Kaká scored his first international goal when Brazil won 6–1. Six years later, on 6 November 2008, Guðmundur played in Iceland's 2–2 draw against Norway in a 2010 FIFA World Cup qualifying match, before he played his last international match when Malta won 1–0 against Iceland in a friendly match two weeks later.

== Honours ==
=== Individual ===
- Topscorer Icelandic Premier League in 2008 with 16 Goals.
- Keflavík Sports Club Sportsman of the Year in 2008.
