= 2004 Icelandic Cup =

Visa-Bikar

Tournament details
- Country: Iceland

Final positions
- Champions: Keflavík
- Runners-up: KA

The 2004 Visa-Bikar was the 45th season of the Icelandic national football cup. It started on 16 May 2004 and concluded with the final on 2 October 2004. The winners qualified for the first qualifying round of the 2005–06 UEFA Cup.

== Preliminary round ==
Team 1	Score	Team 2
16 May 2004
Boltfelag Nordfjörður	1–5	Leiknir Fáskrúðsfirði

== First round ==
Team 1	Score	Team 2
18 May 2004
Neisti Hofsos	1–0 (a.e.t.)	GKS
ÍH	5–1	Afríka
Neisti D.	1–2	Sindri
Höttur	4–1	KE
UMFH	2–1	Hamar
Magni	2–1	Snörtur
20 May 2004
Reynir Arskogsstrond	0–5	KS
Tindastóll	8–2	Hvöt
Boltfelag Husavik	0–8	Leiftur/Dalvík
KF Fjarðabyggð	3–1 (a.e.t.)	Einherji
Huginn	1–2	Leiknir Fáskrúðsfirði
Freyr	1–0	Tunglid

== Second round ==
Team 1	Score	Team 2
31 May 2004
KFS	9–0	Freyr
HK	3–0	Deiglan
1 June 2004
Höttur	2–4	Sindri
Völsungur	6–2	Leiftur/Dalvík
Tindastóll	7–0	Neisti Hofsos
KS	6–1	Magni
Leiknir Fáskrúðsfirði	1–2	KF Fjarðabyggð
Grótta	3–1 (a.e.t.)	Árborg
Selfoss	3–2	Numi
Breiðablik	13–0	Drangur
Afturelding	4–3	Skallagrímur
Fjölnir	1–1 (a.e.t.); 4−3 (pen)	Leiknir Reykjavík
Víkingur Ólafsvík	0–1	Víðir
Hamar	1–2	Ægir
ÍH	3–0^{1}	ÍR

^{1}The match finished 2–2 (a.e.t.) with ÍR winning 5–4 on penalties. However, ÍH were awarded the match 3–0 after ÍR fielded an ineligible player.

== Third round ==
Team 1	Score	Team 2
12 June 2004
Fram	4–0	Grótta
Fylkir	2–0	ÍH
Afturelding	5–0	Haukar
Reynir Sandgerði	1–0	Þór Akureyri
Fjölnir	1–2	ÍBV
Selfoss	0–2	Grindavík
Breiðablik	0–2	Njarðvík
Tindastóll	0–1	KA
12 June 2004
Völsungur	0–3	Keflavík
Ægir	0–5	FH
HK	1–0	ÍA
KS	1–2	Stjarnan
Sindri	0–7	Víkingur Reykjavík
Víðir	1–3	KR
KF Fjarðabyggð	0–2	Valur
13 June 2004
KFS	2–3	Þróttur

== Fourth round ==
Team 1	Score	Team 2
2 July 2004
Þróttur	0–1	Valur
ÍBV	1–0	Stjarnan
Njarðvík	1–3	KR
HK	1–0	Reynir Sandgerði
Fylkir	4–1	Grindavík
FH	1–0	Afturelding
3 July 2004
Víkingur Reykjavík	2–4	KA
5 July 2004
Fram	0–1	Keflavík

== Quarter-finals ==
Team 1	Score	Team 2
4 August 2004
HK	1–0	Valur
KR	1–3	FH
5 August 2004
Fylkir	0–1	Keflavík
KA	0–0 (a.e.t.); 3−0 (pen)	ÍBV

== Semi-finals ==
25 September 2004

FH	0–1	KA
		Hringsson 31'

Laugardalsvöllur, Reykjavík
Attendance: 1,115
Referee: Gylfi Þór Orrason

26 September 2004

HK	0–1	Keflavík
		Ramsey 13'

Laugardalsvöllur, Reykjavík
Attendance: 1,555
Referee: Jóhannes Valgeirsson

== Final ==
30 September 2004

KA	0–3	Keflavík
		Kristjansson 11' (pen.), 25'; Sveinsson 90'

Laugardalsvollur, Reykjavík
Attendance: 2,049
Referee: Kristinn Jakobsson
