= 1971 Úrvalsdeild =

Úrvalsdeild
- Season: 1971

Statistics of Úrvalsdeild in the 1971 season.

== Overview ==
It was contested by 8 teams, and Keflavík won the championship. Keflavík's Steinar Jóhannsson was the top scorer with 13 goals.

== Final league table ==
Pos	Team	Pld	W	D	L	GF	GA	GD	Pts	Qualification or relegation
1	Keflavík (C)	14	8	4	2	32	17	+15	20 (Note: Keflavík won the championship playoff match 4–0 over ÍBV on September 19 at Laugardalsvöllur after both teams finished level on points.)	Qualification for the European Cup first round
2	ÍBV	14	9	2	3	37	19	+18	20	Qualification for the UEFA Cup first round
3	Fram	14	7	1	6	29	25	+4	15	
4	ÍA	14	6	2	6	27	27	0	14	
5	Valur	14	6	2	6	24	25	−1	14	
6	KR	14	3	4	7	13	20	−7	10	
7	Breiðablik	14	4	2	8	12	31	−19	10	
8	ÍBA (R)	14	4	1	9	21	31	−10	9	Relegation to 1. deild karla

Source: RSSSF
Rules for classification: 1) points; 2) goal difference; 3) number of goals scored.
(C) Champions; (R) Relegated
Notes:

Víkingur qualified for the Cup Winners' Cup as Icelandic Cup winners from a lower division.

== Results ==
Each team played every opponent once home and away for a total of 14 matches.

Home \ Away	BRE	FRA	ÍA	ÍBA	ÍBV	ÍBK	KR	VAL
Breiðablik		2–1	0–5	1–0	0–1	0–3	1–0	2–0
Fram	2–0		1–0	5–2	3–1	2–1	2–0	1–2
ÍA	3–3	0–4		1–0	1–3	3–1	1–1	1–3
ÍBA	2–0	2–2	1–2		1–4	2–3	1–2	1–0
ÍBV	6–0	4–1	5–3	5–1		1–1	2–1	1–1
Keflavík	4–1	3–0	2–1	4–0	5–3		0–0	2–2
KR	0–0	3–2	1–3	2–3	1–0	1–1		1–2
Valur	4–2	5–3	2–3	0–5	0–1	1–2	2–0	

Source: RSSSF
Legend: Blue = home team win; Yellow = draw; Red = away team win.
