= Þórarinn Kristjánsson =

Icelandic footballer

Personal information
- Full name: Þórarinn Brynjar Kristjánsson
- Date of birth: 30 December 1980 (age 45)
- Height: 1.80 m (5 ft 11 in)
- Position: Striker

Team information
- Current team: Klepp

Senior career*
Years	Team	Apps	(Gls)
1996–2001	Keflavík	72	(22)
2001–2002	East Stirlingshire	1	(0)
2002–2004	Keflavík	53	(28)
2004–2005	Aberdeen	3	(0)
2005	Þróttur	16	(2)
2006–2008	Keflavík	41	(12)
2009	Grindavík	18	(0)
2010	Klepp	?	
- * Club domestic league appearances and goals as of 29 December 2009

Þórarinn Brynjar Kristjánsson (born 30 December 1980) is an Icelandic professional football player. He played three times for Aberdeen in the 2004–05 Scottish Premier League season. He retired in 2010 and has not played since.
