= Knattspyrnudeild Keflavík =

Keflavík
- Full name: Knattspyrnudeild Keflavíkur
- Founded: 1929; 97 years ago
- Ground: Keflavíkurvöllur, Iceland
- Capacity: 5,200
- Chairman: Böðvar Jónsson
- Manager: Haraldur Guðmundsson
- League: Besta deild karla
- 2026: Besta deild karla, 6th of 12
- Website: https://www.keflavik.is/Knattspyrna/
Home colours	Away colours	Third colours

Knattspyrnudeild Keflavíkur (Icelandic pronunciation: [ˈkʰnahtˌspɪ(r)tnʏˌteilt ˈcʰɛplaˌviːk], lit. 'Keflavík Football (Sub)Division') mostly commonly referred to simply as Keflavík, is an Icelandic football team and part of Keflavík ÍF (Keflavík, íþrótta- og ungmennafélag), a multi-sports club based in the town of Reykjanesbær in Iceland. The team plays its home games at Nettó-völlur in Keflavík, and currently plays in the Besta deild karla, the highest tier of Icelandic football.

== Competition history ==
Keflavík have played in the Icelandic football league since 1956. The team has also taken part in every year of the Icelandic FA Cup as well as several minor competitions, including the League Cup. Keflavík has played in all the major European competitions, the European Cup, the UEFA Cup, the Cup Winners' Cup and the Intertoto Cup.

=== League history ===
1956–57: Division 2
1958–60: Division 1
1961–62: Division 2
1963–80: Division 1
1981: Division 2
1982–89: Division 1
1990–92: Division 2
1993–02: Division 1 (Renamed Premier League in 1997)
2003: Division 1
2004–15: Premier League
2016–17: Division 1
2018: Premier League
2019–2020: Division 1
2021–2023: Premier League
2024–present: Division 1

Keflavík first played league football when the team joined the newly formed second division in 1956. Keflavík was promoted in 1957 and played in the top flight from 1958 to 1960. The team returned to the second division in 1961 but were promoted again the following year. After narrowly avoiding relegation in 1963 Keflavík won its first title in 1964. The team also won the title in 1969, 1971 and 1973. Since then the team has mostly played in Iceland's top division, Úrvalsdeild, with four spells in the second tier (1981, 1990–92, 2003 and 2016–17.)

=== Cup history ===
The Icelandic FA Cup was established in 1960 and Keflavík entered from the beginning. The team's first cup game ended in a 0–6 defeat by ÍA. Keflavík reached the semi-final of the competition the next three years and had reached seven semis before playing for the first time in the final in 1973. That game ended in a 1–2 defeat by Fram. In 1975 Keflavík won the cup for the first time, beating ÍA by a single goal. The team reached the final again in 1982, 1985, 1988 and 1993 but lost each time. The duck was broken in 1997 when ÍBV were beaten in a penalty-shootout in a replay. Keflavík won the FA Cup again in 2004 and 2006, first by beating KA 3–0 and then KR 2–0.

=== European history ===
Keflavík played its first European game in 1965 after becoming champions the previous year. The team were drawn against Hungarian side Ferencváros in the European Cup. The Hungarians won 9–1 and 4–1 for a 13–2 aggregate win. In the early 1970s Keflavík were the envy of other Icelandic teams when they were drawn against several top sides, including Everton in 1970, Tottenham Hotspur in 1971 and Real Madrid in 1972. Keflavík's first win in European competition came against Swedish side Kalmar FF in the 1979–80 UEFA Cup. Keflavík won the home match 1–0 and progressed to the second round for the first time, winning on away goals. Keflavík played in the UEFA Europa League in 2009–10 after finishing 2nd in the Icelandic Premier League in 2008 and lost to Maltese club Valletta with the aggregate favoring the Maltese 5–2.

== UEFA club competition record ==
Competition	Matches	W	D	L	GF	GA
UEFA Champions League	8	0	0	8	5	35
UEFA Cup Winners' Cup	6	1	1	4	14	19
UEFA Cup/UEFA Europa League	18	4	2	12	18	44
UEFA Intertoto Cup	12	1	4	7	12	25
Total	44	6	7	31	49	123

=== European competition ===
Season	Competition	Round	Club	Home	Away	Aggregate
1965–66	European Cup	PR	(Hungary) Ferencvárosi TC	1–4	1–9	2–13
1970–71	European Cup	1R	(England) Everton F.C.	2–6	0–3	2–9
1971–72	UEFA Cup	1R	(England) Tottenham Hotspur	1–6	0–9	1-15
1972–73	European Cup	1R	(Spain) Real Madrid	0–1	0–3	0–4
1973–74	UEFA Cup	1R	(Scotland) Hibernian	1-1	0–2	1-3
1974–75	European Cup	1R	(Croatia) Hajduk Split	0–2	1–7	1–9
1975–76	UEFA Cup	1R	(Scotland) Dundee United	0–2	0–4	0-6
1976–77	UEFA Cup Winners' Cup	1R	(Germany) Hamburger SV	1-1	0–3	1-4
1979–80	UEFA Cup	1R	(Sweden) Kalmar	1–0	1–2	2-2 (a)
1979–80	UEFA Cup	2R	(Czech Republic) Zbrojovka Brno	1–2	1–3	2-5
1994–95	UEFA Cup Winners' Cup	QR	(Israel) Maccabi Tel Aviv	1–2	1–4	2-6
1995	Intertoto Cup	GS	(France) Metz	1–2		
1995	Intertoto Cup	GS	(Scotland) Partick Thistle		1–3	
1995	Intertoto Cup	GS	(Croatia) Zagreb	0-0		
1995	Intertoto Cup	GS	(Austria) LASK		1–2	
1996	Intertoto Cup	GS	(Sweden) Örebro		1–3	
1996	Intertoto Cup	GS	(Slovenia) Maribor	0-0		
1996	Intertoto Cup	GS	Austria Wien		0–6	
1996	Intertoto Cup	GS	(Denmark) Copenhagen	1–2		
1998–99	UEFA Cup Winners' Cup	QR	(Latvia) Liepājas Metalurgs	1–0	2–4	3-4
2005–06	UEFA Cup	1QR	(Luxembourg) Etzella	2–0	4–0	6-0
2005–06	UEFA Cup	2QR	(Germany) Mainz	0–2	0–2	0-4
2006	UEFA Intertoto Cup	1R	(Northern Ireland) Dungannon Swifts	4–1	0-0	4-1
2006	UEFA Intertoto Cup	2R	(Norway) Lillestrøm	2-2	1–4	3-6
2007–08	UEFA Cup	1QR	(Denmark) Midtjylland	3–2	1–2	4-4 (a)
2009–10	UEFA Europa League	1R	(Malta) Valletta	2-2	0–3	2-5

== Team colours ==
The Keflavík football team originally played in black shirts and white shorts. In 1973, the team changed its strip to yellow shirts and blue shorts. One reason given for the change was the memory of the team's first European away match, against Ferencváros in Budapest. The Keflavík players were playing in floodlights for the first time and had trouble spotting each other in their black shirts.

In 2014 through 2016 Keflavik played in black and white home jerseys and an all-white away jersey in honor of their 100th anniversary. Since 2017, the club has most commonly played in an all-navy blue strip.

== Achievements ==
- Úrvalsdeild karla (Icelandic Championships): 4
  - 1964, 1969, 1971, 1973
- Icelandic Cups: 4
  - 1975, 1997, 2004, 2006
- Icelandic Super Cups: 6
  - 1970, 1972, 1973, 1975, 1976, 1998

== Management ==
=== Club officials ===
==== Coaching staff ====
Position	Name
Manager	(Iceland) Haraldur Freyr Guðmundsson
Assistant manager	(Iceland) Hólmar Örn Rúnarsson
Goalkeeping coach	(Iceland) Ómar Jóhannsson
Physiotherapist & Massage therapist	(Iceland) Óskar Ingi Víglundsson
Photographer	(Iceland) Jón Örvar Arason
Kitman	(Iceland) Þórólfur Þorsteinsson

=== Board ===
Position	Name
Chairman	(Iceland) Böðvar Jónsson

=== Former coaches ===
- (Iceland) Hafsteinn Guðmundsson (1956–60)
- (Iceland) Albert Guðmundsson (1960)
- (Iceland) Högni Gunnlaugsson (1961–62)
- (Iceland) Guðbjörn Jónsson (1962–63)
- (Iceland) Óli B. Jónsson (1964–65)
- (Iceland) Reynir Karlsson (1966)
- (Iceland) Ríkharður Jónsson (1967)
- (Iceland) Reynir Karlsson (1968)
- (Iceland) Hólmbert Friðjónsson (1969–70)
- (Iceland) Einar Helgason (1971–72)
- (England) Joe Hooley (1973)
- (England) George Smith (1974)
- (England) Joe Hooley (1975)
- (Iceland) Guðni Kjartansson & (Iceland) Jón Jóhannsson (1975)
- (Scotland) James Craig (1976)
- (Iceland) Guðni Kjartansson (1976)
- (Iceland) Hólmbert Friðjónsson (1977)
- (Iceland) Guðni Kjartansson (1978)
- (Australia) Ron Smith (1979)
- (Iceland) Kjartan Sigtryggsson (1979)
- (England) Tommy Tranter (1979)
- (Iceland) Guðni Kjartansson (1979)
- (Scotland) John McKernan (1980)
- (Iceland) Guðni Kjartansson (1981)
- (Iceland) Karl Hermannsson (1982)
- (Iceland) Guðni Kjartansson (1983)
- (Iceland) Haukur Hafsteinsson (1984)
- (Iceland) Hólmbert Friðjónsson (1985–86)
- (England) Peter Keeling (1987)
- (England) Frank Upton (1987–88)
- (Iceland) Ástráður Gunnarsson (1989)
- (Iceland) Hólmbert Friðjónsson (1989)
- (Iceland) Þorsteinn Ólafsson (1990)
- (Iceland) Kjartan Másson (1991–93)
- (Scotland) Ian Ross (1994)
- (Iceland) Pétur Pétursson (1994)
- (Iceland) Ingi Björn Albertsson (1995)
- (Iceland) Þórir Sigfússon (1995)
- (Iceland) Kjartan Masson (1996)
- (Iceland) Sigurður Björgvinsson & (Iceland) Gunnar Oddsson (1997–99)
- (Iceland) Kjartan Másson (1999)
- (Iceland) Páll Guðlaugsson (2000)
- (Iceland) Gunnar Oddsson (2000)
- (Iceland) Gústav Adolf Björnsson (2001)
- (Iceland) Kjartan Másson (2002)
- (Serbia) Milan Janković (1 Jan 2003 – 31 Dec 2004)
- (Iceland) Guðjón Þórðarson (Pre-season 2005 – 17 May 2005)
- (Iceland) Kristján Guðmundsson (1 May 2005 – 31 Dec 2009)
- (Iceland) Willum Þór Þórsson (20 Feb 2010 – 31 Dec 2011)
- (Bosnia and Herzegovina) Zoran Daníel Ljubičić (1 Jan 2012 – 19 June 2013)
- (Iceland) Kristján Guðmundsson (19 June 2013 – 5 June 2015)
- (Iceland) Þorvaldur Örlygsson (10 October 2015–4 October 2016)
- (Iceland) Guðlaugur Baldursson (10 October 2016–)
- (Iceland) Eysteinn Húni Hauksson / Sigurður Ragnar Eyjólfsson (2019-2022)

== Players ==
=== Current squad ===
As of 26 August 2026

Note: Flags indicate national team as defined under FIFA eligibility rules; some limited exceptions apply. Players may hold more than one non-FIFA nationality.

No.	Pos.	Nation	Player
1	GK	ISL	Ásgeir Orri Magnússon
2	DF	UGA	Elvis Bwomono
3	DF	ISL	Axel Ingi Jóhannesson
4	DF	ESP	Nacho Heras
6	MF	ISL	Sindri Snær Magnússon
7	FW	ISL	Dagur Ingi Valsson
10	FW	ISL	Stefan Ljubicic
12	GK	ISL	Rúnar Gissurarson
13	DF	SWE	Anton Kralj
14	FW	CRO	Marin Mudražija
15	FW	ISL	Arnór Atli Aðalbjörnsson
17	MF	ISL	Baldur Logi Gudlaugsson
18	MF	ISL	Ernir Bjarnason

No.	Pos.	Nation	Player
20	DF	CRO	Marin Brigić
21	DF	SLE	Alpha Conteh (on loan from Stjarnan)
22	DF	ISL	Ásgeir Páll Magnússon
23	FW	ISL	Eiður Orri Ragnarsson
24	DF	ISL	Viktor Elmar Gautason
25	MF	ISL	Frans Elvarsson
28	MF	ISL	Viktor Árni Traustason
30	GK	SWE	Mirsad Basić
42	MF	ISL	Baldur Logi Brynjarsson
47	DF	ISL	Egill Valur Karlsson
77	FW	ISL	Mihajlo Rajakovac
88	DF	CRO	Mate Šimičić

=== Out on loan ===
Note: Flags indicate national team as defined under FIFA eligibility rules; some limited exceptions apply. Players may hold more than one non-FIFA nationality.

No.	Pos.	Nation	Player
29	GK	ISL	Guðjón Snorri Herbertsson on loan at Reynir

== Player records ==
All current players are in bold.

=== Most league appearances ===
Apps	Player
244	(Iceland) Guðmundur Steinarsson
214	(Iceland) Sigurður Björgvinsson
189	(Iceland) Magnús Sverrir Þorsteinsson
180	(Iceland) Þorsteinn Bjarnason
177	(Iceland) Gunnar Oddsson
177	(Iceland) Óli Þór Magnússon
172	(Iceland) Gestur Gylfason
157	(Iceland) Ómar Jóhannsson
155	(Iceland) Guðjón Árni Antoníusson
154	(Iceland) Jón Ólafur Jónsson
151	(Iceland) Ólafur Júlíusson
149	(Iceland) **Jóhann Birnir Guðmundsson**
149	(Iceland) Þórarinn Kristjánsson
147	(Iceland) Ragnar Margeirsson
147	(Iceland) Karl Hermannsson

=== Most league goals ===
Goals	Player
81	(Iceland) Guðmundur Steinarsson
72	(Iceland) Steinar Jóhannsson
57	(Iceland) Óli Þór Magnússon
49	(Iceland) Ragnar Margeirsson
48	(Iceland) Þórarinn Kristjánsson
44	(Iceland) **Hörður Sveinsson**
39	(Iceland) **Jóhann Birnir Guðmundsson**
31	(Iceland) Jón Ólafur Jónsson
28	(Iceland) Magnús Sverrir Þorsteinsson
27	(Iceland) Friðrik Ragnarsson
26	(Iceland) Ólafur Júlíusson
26	(Iceland) Haukur Ingi Guðnason
24	(Iceland) Jón Jóhannsson
24	(Iceland) Einar Ásbjörn Ólafsson

== Stadium information ==
- Name – HS Orku völlurinn
- City – Keflavík, Reykjanesbær
- Capacity – 5,200
- Built – 1968

== Kit and shirt sponsors ==
Year	Kit Manufacturer	Shirt Sponsor
1973	Unknown	Víkurbær
1974	Unknown	Sunna
1975	Unknown	Víkurbær
1976	Unknown	SpKef
1977	Unknown	SpKef
1978	Unknown	SpKef
1979	Unknown	SpKef
1980	Unknown	SpKef
1981	Unknown	SpKef
1982	Unknown	Fisher
1983	Puma	Fisher
1984	Adidas	Byggingaval
1985	Adidas	Samvinnuferðir Landsýn
1986	Adidas	Samvinnuferðir Landsýn
1987	Adidas	Bylgjan FM989
1988	Adidas	Ragnarsbakarí
1989	Adidas	Útvegsbankinn
1990	Berri	Íslandsbanki
1991	Berri	Íslandsbanki
1992	Berri	Íslandsbanki
1993	Berri	SpKef
1994	Berri	SpKef
1995	Berri	SpKef
1996	Berri	SpKef
1997	Berri	SpKef
1998	Berri	SpKef
1999	Nike	SpKef
2000	Nike	SpKef
2001	Nike	SpKef
2002	Nike	SpKef
2003	Nike	SpKef
2004	Puma	SpKef
2005	Puma	SpKef
2006	Puma	SpKef
2007	Puma	SpKef
2008	Puma	SpKef
2009	Puma	SpKef
2010	Puma	SpKef
2011	Puma	Landsbankinn
2012	Puma	Landsbankinn
2013	Puma	Landsbankinn
2014	Nike	Landsbankinn
2015	Nike	Landsbankinn
2016	Nike	Landsbankinn
2017	Nike	Geysir Car Rental
2018	Nike	Geysir Car Rental
2019	Nike	Geysir Car Rental
2020	Nike	Geysir Car Rental
2021	Nike	Geysir Car Rental
2022	Nike	Geysir Car Rental
2023	Adidas	Blue Car Rental
2024	Adidas	Blue Car Rental
2025	Adidas	Blue Car Rental
