= 2001 Icelandic Cup =

Coca-Cola bikar

Tournament details
- Country: Iceland

Final positions
- Champions: Fylkir
- Runners-up: KA

The 2001 Coca-Cola bikar was the 42nd season of the Icelandic national football cup. It started on 22 May 2001 and concluded with the final on 28 September 2001. The winners qualified for the qualifying round of the 2002–03 UEFA Cup.

== First round ==
Team 1	Score	Team 2
22 May 2001
Þróttur U23	4–1	Barðaströnd
FH U23	7–2	Kári
ÍA U23	1–4	Víkingur Reykjavík U23
Reynir Sandgerði	3–1	Valur U23
Fylkir U23	2–1	Breiðablik U23
HK	1–2	Fram U23
Haukar U23	0–2	Selfoss
KFF	6–1	Boltafélag Norðfjarðar
Njarðvík	0–3	Keflavík U23
GG	2–0	Úlfarnir
Arborg FC	6–1	ÍH
Neisti H.	0–1	Nökkvi
Leiknir F.	3–2 (a.e.t.)	Huginn/Höttur
23 May 2001
Víkingur Ólafsvík	9–0	Tálknafjörður
24 May 2001
ÍR U23	2–0	Ægir
28 May 2001
Hvöt	0–1	Dalvík

== Second round ==
Team 1	Score	Team 2
30 May 2001
Keflavík U23	5–3	KR U23
31 May 2001
Leiknir	2–0	FH U23
Haukar	4–1	Skallagrímur
Magni	1–2	Nökkvi
GG	1–2	Víðir
Selfoss	3–1	Léttir
Sindri	4–0	Neisti D.
Fylkir U23	0–1	Fram U23
Leiknir F.	0–2	KFF
1 June 2001
Víkingur Reykjavík U23	2–0	Afturelding
3 June 2001
KS	2–0	Völsungur
HSH	1–4	Þróttur
4 June 2001
þór Akureyri	1–0	Dalvík
KFS	4–1	ÍR U23
Arborg FC	3–0^{1}	Þróttur U23

^{1}The match finished 2–1 for þróttur U23. However, Arborg FC were awarded the match 3–0 after þróttur U23 fielded an ineligible player.

== Third round ==
Team 1	Score	Team 2
13 June 2001
Leiknir	1–4	Grindavík
14 June 2001
Haukar	1–2	Valur
Þróttur	0–4	KR
Selfoss	0–6	Fram
KS	1–0	Tindastóll
KFF	0–5	Breiðablik
Reynir Sandgerði	0–9	Keflavík
KFS	2–4 (a.e.t.)	Fylkir
Víðir	2–1 (a.e.t.)	ÍR
15 June 2001
Víkingur	4–1	Nökkvi
Víkingur Reykjavík U23	1–2	ÍBV
Arborg FC	1–4 (a.e.t.)	Stjarnan
Þór Akureyri	0–5	ÍA
Sindri	1–0	Leiftur Olafsjördur
Keflavík U23	0–3	KA
Fram U23	0–2	FH

== Fourth round ==
Team 1	Score	Team 2
3 July 2001
Víðir	0–2 (a.e.t.)	KA
4 July 2001
Stjarnan	0–2	FH
Valur	2–3	Fram
KS	1–3	Grindavík
5 July 2001
Víkingur	1–4	ÍA
KR	0–1	Fylkir
Sindri	0–3	Keflavík
ÍBV	3–1	Breiðablik

== Quarter-finals ==
22 July 2001

KA	2–1	Keflavík
Sigþórsson 81'; Sigbjörnsson 88'		Guðnason 78'

KA-völlur, Akureyri
Referee: Bragi Bergmann

22 July 2001

Fram	0–0 (a.e.t.)	ÍA
Penalties
	5–6

Laugardalsvollur, Reykjavík
Referee: Jóhannes Valgeirsson

22 July 2001

FH	1–0	ÍBV
Björnsson 52'

Kaplakrikavöllur, Hafnarfjörður
Referee: Garðar Örn Hinriksson

23 July 2001

Grindavík	1–3	Fylkir
Flóventsson 53'		Stígsson 52'; Pétursson 97'; Jóhannesson 118'

Grindavíkurvöllur, Grindavík
Referee: Eyjólfur Ólafsson

== Semi-finals ==
11 September 2001

FH	0–3 (a.e.t.)	KA
		Hringsson 37'; Bjarklind 49'; Sigbjörnsson 74'

Kaplakrikavöllur, Hafnarfjörður
Attendance: 650
Referee: Egill Már Markússon

12 September 2001

ÍA	0–2	Fylkir
		Óskarsson 32'; Jónsson 75'

Akranesvöllur, Akranes
Attendance: 1,254
Referee: Gísli Hlynur Jóhannsson

== Final ==
28 September 2001

Fylkir	2–2 (a.e.t.)	KA
Sverrisson 48'; Stígsson 69'		Hringsson 33', 56' (pen.)
Penalties
Sverrisson (penalty scored); Jónsson (penalty scored); Bjarnason (penalty scored); Pétursson (penalty scored); Gíslason (penalty scored)	5–4	(penalty scored) Hringsson; (penalty scored) Jóhannsson; (penalty scored) Sigurðsson; (penalty scored) Örlygsson; (penalty missed) Martin

Laugardalsvollur, Reykjavík
Attendance: 2,839
Referee: Gylfi Þór Orrason
