= 2018 Knattspyrnufélag Akureyrar season =

Knattspyrnufélag Akureyrar
2018 season
- Chairman: Eiríkur S. Jóhannsson
- Manager: Srdjan Tufegdzic
- Stadium: Akureyrarvöllur
Home colours	Away colours

The 2018 season was KA's second season back in top tier football in Iceland following their relegation in 2004. This was their 17th season in the top flight of Icelandic football. KA finished the previous season in 7th place.

== Squad ==
As of 25 February 2018

Note: Flags indicate national team as defined under FIFA eligibility rules; some limited exceptions apply. Players may hold more than one non-FIFA nationality.

No.	Pos.	Nation	Player
1	GK	ESP	Cristian Martinez Liberato
3	DF	ENG	Callum Williams
4	MF	ISL	Ólafur Aron Pétursson
5	DF	ISL	Guðmann Þórisson (captain)
6	DF	ISL	Hallgrímur Jónasson
7	DF	ISL	Hjörvar Sigurgeirsson
8	FW	ISL	Steinþór Freyr Þorsteinsson
9	FW	ISL	Elfar Árni Aðalsteinsson
10	FW	ISL	Hallgrímur Mar Steingrímsson
11	FW	ISL	Ásgeir Sigurgeirsson
12	DF	SRB	Milan Joksimović
16	DF	ISL	Brynjar Ingi Bjarnason

No.	Pos.	Nation	Player
18	GK	ISL	Aron Elí Gíslason
20	DF	SRB	Aleksandar Trninic
21	DF	ISL	Ívar Örn Árnason
22	DF	ISL	Hrannar Björn Steingrímsson
24	MF	ISL	Daníel Hafsteinsson
25	MF	ENG	Archange Nkumu
27	FW	ISL	Angantýr Máni Gautason
28	FW	ISL	Sæþór Olgeirsson
30	MF	ISL	Ýmir Már Geirsson
35	FW	ISL	Frosti Brynjólfsson
49	MF	ISL	Áki Sölvason

=== Out on loan ===
Note: Flags indicate national team as defined under FIFA eligibility rules; some limited exceptions apply. Players may hold more than one non-FIFA nationality.

No.	Pos.	Nation	Player
—	GK	ISL	Aron Dagur Jóhannsson (at Völsungur until 1 October 2018)
—	MF	ISL	Bjarni Aðalsteinsson (at Magni until 1 October 2018)

== Transfers ==
=== Winter ===
In: Note: Flags indicate national team as defined under FIFA eligibility rules; some limited exceptions apply. Players may hold more than one non-FIFA nationality.

No.	Pos.	Nation	Player
1	GK	ESP	Cristian Martinez (from (Iceland) Víkingur Ó.)
6	DF	ISL	Hallgrímur Jónasson (from (Denmark) Lyngby BK)
12	DF	SRB	Milan Joksimovic (from (Belarus) FC Gorodeya)
28	FW	ISL	Sæþór Olgeirsson (from (Iceland) Völsungur)

Out: Note: Flags indicate national team as defined under FIFA eligibility rules; some limited exceptions apply. Players may hold more than one non-FIFA nationality.

No.	Pos.	Nation	Player
7	MF	ISL	Almarr Ormarsson (to (Iceland) Fjölnir)
16	DF	ISL	Davíð Rúnar Bjarnason (to (Iceland) Magni)
19	DF	MNE	Darko Bulatovic (to (Serbia) FK Voždovac)
23	GK	SRB	Srdjan Rajkovic (Retired)
26	DF	CRO	Vedran Turkalj (Contract expiration)
28	FW	DEN	Emil Lyng (to (Scotland) Dundee United F.C.)
30	DF	ISL	Bjarki Þór Viðarsson (to (Iceland) Þór)

=== Summer ===
In: Note: Flags indicate national team as defined under FIFA eligibility rules; some limited exceptions apply. Players may hold more than one non-FIFA nationality.

No.	Pos.	Nation	Player

Out: Note: Flags indicate national team as defined under FIFA eligibility rules; some limited exceptions apply. Players may hold more than one non-FIFA nationality.

No.	Pos.	Nation	Player

== Competitions ==
=== Table ===
Pos	Team	Pld	W	D	L	GF	GA	GD	Pts
5	FH	22	10	7	5	36	28	+8	37
6	ÍBV	22	8	5	9	29	31	−2	29
7	KA	22	7	7	8	36	34	+2	28
8	Fylkir	22	7	5	10	31	37	−6	26
9	Víkingur R.	22	6	7	9	29	38	−9	25

Source: KSÍ (in Icelandic), Soccerway
Rules for classification: 1) Points; 2) Goal difference; 3) Goals scored; 4) Head-to-head points; 5) Head-to-head goal difference; 6) Head-to-head goals scored; 7) Head-to-head away goals scored; 8) Play-off (only for deciding champion); 9) Draw.
