= Dean Martin (footballer, born 1972) =

English footballer (born 1972)

Personal information
- Full name: Dean Edward Martin
- Date of birth: 31 August 1972 (age 54)
- Place of birth: Islington, England
- Height: 1.73 m (5 ft 8 in)
- Position: Midfielder

Team information
- Current team: ÍA (assistant coach)

Youth career
- West Ham United

Senior career*
Years	Team	Apps	(Gls)
1990–1991	Fisher Athletic		
1991–1993	West Ham United	2	(0)
1992–1993	→ Colchester United (loan)	8	(2)
1993–1995	Kettering Town	43	(6)
1995	KA	16	(3)
1995–1996	Brentford	19	(1)
1996	KA	15	(1)
1996	Eastern AA		
1996–1997	Hong Kong Rangers		
1997	KA	5	(0)
1997–1998	Hong Kong Rangers		
1998	ÍA	10	(2)
1998	Bohemians	3	(0)
1999	Hereford United	1	(0)
1999	KA	14	(3)
1999–2000	Stevenage Borough	22	(2)
2000	KA	16	(3)
2000–2001	Stevenage Borough	29	(4)
2001–2004	KA	69	(5)
2005–2007	ÍA	28	(2)
2007–2010	KA	60	(5)
2010–2013	ÍA	43	(5)
2013–2014	ÍBV	16	(0)

Managerial career
- 2007–2010: KA (player-manager)
- 2014–2016: Breiðablik U19
- 2016–2017: HK U19
- –2017: Iceland U16
- 2017: Iceland U15
- 2018–2023: Selfoss
- * Club domestic league appearances and goals

Dean Edward Martin (born 31 August 1972) is an English football manager, coach and former player who is assistant coach of ÍA.

A midfielder, Martin spent much of his playing career in Iceland with KA and ÍA and he also played in England, Hong Kong and the Republic of Ireland. He moved into coaching and management whilst still a player and has held senior and youth roles with club and international teams in Iceland.

== Playing career ==
=== Early years ===
A midfielder, Martin began his career in Sunday League football, before moving to Conference club Fisher Athletic. He returned to First Division club West Ham United, with whom he had spent a period as a youth, for a £25,000 fee in May 1991. Martin made three appearances during the second half of the 1991–92 season, which would be his only for the club. He spent the opening month of 1993 on loan at Third Division club Colchester United and was released by the Hammers to join Conference club Kettering Town in September 1993, where he remained until 1995.

=== Iceland ===
Martin moved to Iceland to join 1. deild karla club KA in 1995. Martin's Icelandic career stretched from 1995 to 2014 and he played in the top two divisions, principally for KA and ÍA. He won a promotion from the 1. deild karla with each club and played European football for both. Martin retired at age 42, after spending the 2014 Úrvalsdeild season with ÍBV.

=== Football nomad ===
Between 1995 and 2001, Martin spent the autumn and winter months playing for clubs outside Iceland. He returned to England to play for Brentford (1995–96), Hereford United (1998–99) and Stevenage Borough during the 1999–00 and 2000–01 seasons. He also played in Hong Kong for Eastern AA and Hong Kong Rangers and in the Republic of Ireland for Bohemians.

== Managerial and coaching career ==
Martin completed his KSÍ 'A' coaching badges in 2009 and has a BSc in Sports Science from Reykjavík University. He has held management roles at KA, Breiðablik U19 and HK U19. He has worked as an assistant manager at club sides ÍA, ÍBV and HK. On 26 September 2018, Martin was appointed as manager of newly-relegated 2. deild karla club Selfoss on a two-year contract. He achieved promotion back to the 1. deild karla in 2020, but suffered relegation back to the 2. deild karla in 2023. Martin departed the club in September 2023 and immediately rejoined former club ÍA as an assistant coach.

In international football, Martin has assisted and coached Iceland at youth level and in January 2017 he was appointed the KSÍ's head of talent identification. He departed his roles to become assistant manager of China Women in November 2017, but he left the setup after manager Sigurður Ragnar Eyjólfsson was sacked in May 2018.

== Career statistics ==
Appearances and goals by club, season and competition
Club	Season	League			National cup (Note: Includes FA Cup, Icelandic Cup)		League cup (Note: Includes Football League Cup, Icelandic League Cup)		Europe		Other		Total	
Club	Season	Division	Apps	Goals	Apps	Goals	Apps	Goals	Apps	Goals	Apps	Goals	Apps	Goals
West Ham United	1991–92	First Division	2	0	1	0	0	0	—		—		3	0
Colchester United (loan)	1992–93	Third Division	8	2	—		—		—		—		8	2
KA	1995	1. deild karla	16	3	1	0	—		—		—		17	3
Brentford	1995–96	Second Division	19	1	5	0	—		—		1 (Note: Appearance in Football League Trophy)	0	25	1
KA	1996	1. deild karla	15	1	3	0	—		—		0	0	18	1
KA	1997	1. deild karla	5	0	2	1	—		—		—		7	1
ÍA	1998	Úrvalsdeild	10	2	0	0	—		2 (Note: Appearances in UEFA Cup)	0	—		12	2
Hereford United	1998–99	Conference	1	0	—		—		—		—		1	0
KA	1999	1. deild karla	14	3	0	0	—		—		0	0	14	3
Stevenage Borough	1999-00	Conference	22	2	—		—		—		1 (Note: Appearances in FA Trophy)	0	23	2
KA	2000	1. deild karla	16	3	2	1	0	0	—		0	0	18	4
Stevenage Borough	2000–01	Conference	29	4	2	0	—		—		4	0	35	4
KA	2001	1. deild karla	18	2	5	0	0	0	—		0	0	23	2
KA	2002	Úrvalsdeild	17	1	3	0	8	0	—		0	0	28	1
KA	2003	Úrvalsdeild	16	2	4	1	5	0	2 (Note: Appearances in Intertoto Cup)	0	3 (Note: Appearances in Northern Iceland Cup)	2	30	5
KA	2004	Úrvalsdeild	15	0	5	0	7	1	—		6	0	33	1
KA	Total		66	5	17	1	20	1	2	0	9	2	114	9
ÍA	2005	Úrvalsdeild	14	2	3	0	9	2	2	0	—		28	4
ÍA	2006	Úrvalsdeild	9	0	1	0	6	2	1	0	—		17	2
ÍA	2007	Úrvalsdeild	5	0	1	0	3	0	—		—		9	0
ÍA	Total		28	2	5	0	18	4	3	0	—		54	6
KA	2008	1. deild karla	21	3	1	0	4	0	—		4	1	30	4
KA	2009	1. deild karla	21	1	2	0	5	1	—		2	0	30	2
KA	2010	1. deild karla	18	1	2	0	5	0	—		3	1	28	2
KA	KA total		192	20	28	3	34	2	2	0	18	4	274	29
ÍA	2011	1. deild karla	20	1	1	1	6	0	—		—		27	2
ÍA	2012	Úrvalsdeild	19	4	1	0	6	0	—		—		26	4
ÍA	2013	Úrvalsdeild	4	0	0	0	3	0	—		—		7	0
ÍA	ÍA total		81	9	7	1	33	4	5	0	—		126	14
ÍBV	2014	Úrvalsdeild	16	4	0	0	2	0	—		—		18	4
Career total			370	42	43	4	69	6	7	0	19	4	508	56

== Honours ==
=== As a player ===
ÍA

- 1. deild karla: 2011

KA

- 1. deild karla second-place promotion: 2001

=== As a manager ===
- 2. deild karla second-place promotion: 2020
