= Kristján Örn Sigurðsson =

Icelandic footballer

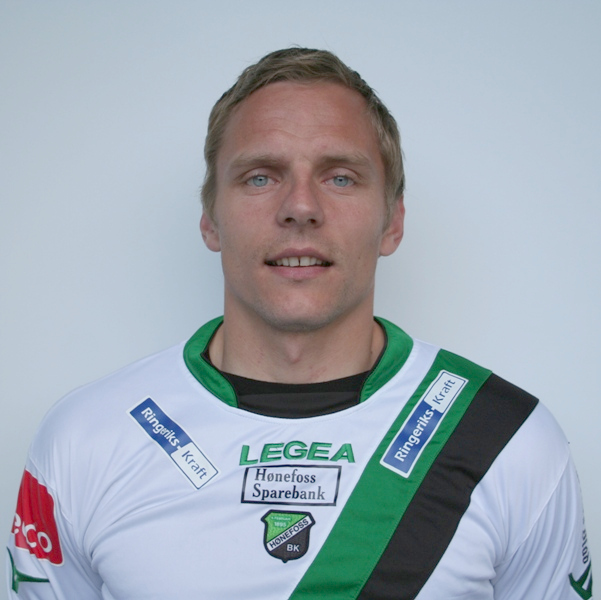
- Sigurðsson with Hønefoss

Personal information
- Date of birth: 7 October 1980 (age 46)
- Place of birth: Akureyri, Iceland
- Height: 1.85 m (6 ft 1 in)
- Position: Defender

Youth career
- 1995: Þór

Senior career*
Years	Team	Apps	(Gls)
1996	Völsungur	15	(0)
1997	KA	15	(0)
1997–2001	Stoke City	0	(0)
2001–2002	KA	34	(3)
2003–2004	KR	33	(1)
2005–2009	Brann	120	(10)
2010–2014	Hønefoss	135	(11)
2017	Þór	18	(2)

International career
1996–1997	Iceland U-17	9	(0)
1998	Iceland U-19	6	(0)
2003–2011	Iceland	53	(4)

Managerial career
- 2017: Þór (assistant manager)
- * Club domestic league appearances and goals

Kristján Örn Sigurðsson (born 7 October 1980 in Akureyri) is an Icelandic footballer who played as a defender. He is a player-assistant manager for Þór.

== Club career ==
He started his career at his local club ÍF Völsungur Húsavik, and moved to Stoke City in England as a teenager. Failing to grab a place on the first team, he returned to Iceland to play for KR. After the 2004 season he moved to SK Brann in Bergen, Norway. He showed acceptable defensive skills, but clear weaknesses in his passing game and general offensive play from his right back position. Before the 2006 season, Kristján was moved into the central defence, after both Ragnvald Soma and Paul Scharner were sold after the 2005 season.

Kristján showed great speed, being tested as the fastest Brann player in the 40 metre dash before the 2006 season. He is also considered to have great strength in the air, even though he is shorter than most players who play in his position. Kristján and his teammate Ólafur Örn Bjarnason started the season excellently and were nicknamed Ørneredet which means Eagle's nest (Örn/Ørn is the Norwegian and Icelandic word for eagle). After several years in Bergen including the 2007 season which ended at the top position in the Norwegian Premier League, his contract with Brann ended after the 2009 season.

Kristján retired after 2014 season. However, he came out of his retirement in 2017 after his brother, Lárus Sigurðsson, took over as manager of Þór.

== International career ==
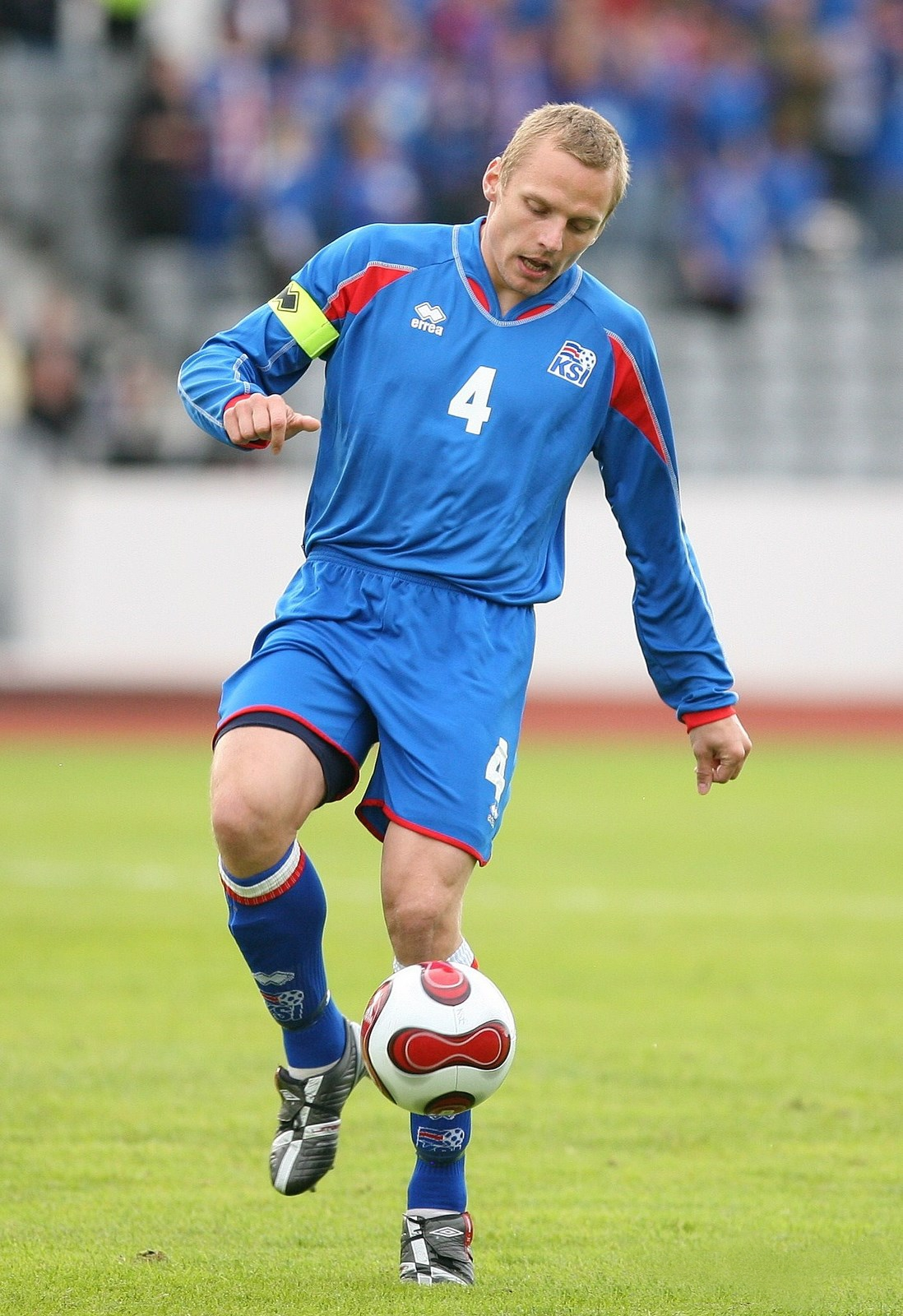
Sigurðsson with the Iceland national team

Kristján made his debut for Iceland in 2003 and went on to earn 53 caps. On 9 February 2012 he announced his retirement from international football.

== Career statistics ==
=== Club ===
Club	Season	League			Cup		Total	
Club	Season	Division	Apps	Goals	Apps	Goals	Apps	Goals
Völsungur	1996	1. deild karla	15	0	—		15	0
KA	1997	1. deild karla	15	0	—		15	0
Stoke City	1997–98	First Division	0	0	0	0	0	0
Stoke City	1998–99	Second Division	0	0	0	0	0	0
Stoke City	1999–2000	Second Division	0	0	0	0	0	0
Stoke City	2000–01	Second Division	0	0	0	0	0	0
Stoke City	Total		0	0	0	0	0	0
KA	2001	1. deild karla	17	2	—		17	2
KA	2002	Úrvalsdeild	17	1	—		17	1
KA	Total		34	3	0	0	34	3
KR	2003	Úrvalsdeild	16	0	—		16	0
KR	2004	Úrvalsdeild	17	1	—		17	1
KR	Total		33	1	0	0	33	1
Brann	2005	Tippeligaen	24	0	5	0	29	0
Brann	2006	Tippeligaen	24	3	4	1	28	4
Brann	2007	Tippeligaen	25	4	3	0	28	4
Brann	2008	Tippeligaen	19	1	1	0	20	1
Brann	2009	Tippeligaen	28	2	4	0	32	2
Brann	Total		120	10	17	1	137	11
Hønefoss	2010	Tippeligaen	27	0	1	0	28	0
Hønefoss	2011	Norwegian First Division	28	6	4	0	32	6
Hønefoss	2012	Tippeligaen	28	3	2	0	30	3
Hønefoss	2013	Tippeligaen	25	1	0	0	25	1
Hønefoss	2014	Norwegian First Division	27	1	0	0	27	1
Hønefoss	Total		135	11	7	0	142	11
Þór	2017	1. deild karla	18	2	—		18	2
Career total			370	27	24	1	394	28

=== International ===
National team	Year	Apps	Goals
Iceland	2003	1	0
Iceland	2004	8	0
Iceland	2005	8	2
Iceland	2006	2	0
Iceland	2007	9	0
Iceland	2008	6	0
Iceland	2009	9	2
Iceland	2010	5	0
Iceland	2011	4	0
Total		52	4

== International goals ==
No.	Date	Venue	Opponent	Score	Result	Competition
2.	4 June 2005	Laugardalsvöllur, Reykjavík, Iceland	Hungary	2–2	2–3	2006 FIFA World Cup qualification
3.	6 June 2009	Laugardalsvöllur, Reykjavík, Iceland	Netherlands	1–2	1–2	2010 FIFA World Cup qualification

== Honours ==
=== Norway ===
- Norwegian Premier League: 2007

=== Iceland ===
- Icelandic Premier League: 2003
