= 2017 KA Fotball season =

Knattspyrnufélag Akureyrar
2017 season
- Chairman: Eiríkur S. Jóhannsson
- Manager: Srdjan Tufegdzic
- Stadium: Akureyrarvöllur
- Úrvalsdeild: 7th
- Icelandic Cup: Third round vs ÍR
- Top goalscorer: League: Elfar Árni Aðalsteinsson, Emil Lyng (9); All: Elfar Árni Aðalsteinsson (10)
- Highest home attendance: 1044 vs. Fjölnir
- Lowest home attendance: 640 vs. Víkingur R.
- Average home league attendance: 791
Home colours	Away colours

The 2017 season was KA's first season back in the Úrvalsdeild following their relegation in 2004, their 16th season in the top flight of Icelandic football. KA finished the previous season in the first place in 1.deild which secured them a place in the 2017 season of the Úrvalsdeild.

== Squad ==
As of 5 January 2018

Note: Flags indicate national team as defined under FIFA eligibility rules; some limited exceptions apply. Players may hold more than one non-FIFA nationality.

No.	Pos.	Nation	Player
1	GK	(Iceland) ISL	Aron Dagur Jóhannsson
2	DF	(Iceland) ISL	Baldvin Ólafsson
3	DF	(England) ENG	Callum Williams
4	MF	(Iceland) ISL	Ólafur Aron Pétursson
5	DF	(Iceland) ISL	Guðmann Þórisson (captain)
6	MF	(Iceland) ISL	Halldór Hermann Jónsson
7	MF	(Iceland) ISL	Almarr Ormarsson
8	FW	(Iceland) ISL	Steinþór Freyr Þorsteinsson
9	FW	(Iceland) ISL	Elfar Árni Aðalsteinsson
10	FW	(Iceland) ISL	Hallgrímur Mar Steingrímsson
11	FW	(Iceland) ISL	Ásgeir Sigurgeirsson
16	DF	(Iceland) ISL	Davíð Rúnar Bjarnason
17	MF	(Iceland) ISL	Kristófer Páll Viðarsson (on loan from Víkingur)

No.	Pos.	Nation	Player
19	DF	(Montenegro) MNE	Darko Bulatovic
20	DF	(Serbia) SRB	Aleksandar Trninic
21	DF	(Iceland) ISL	Ívar Örn Árnason
22	DF	(Iceland) ISL	Hrannar Björn Steingrímsson
23	GK	(Serbia) SRB	Srdjan Rajkovic
24	MF	(Iceland) ISL	Daníel Hafsteinsson
25	MF	(England) ENG	Archange Nkumu
26	DF	(Croatia) CRO	Vedran Turkalj
28	FW	(Denmark) DEN	Emil Lyng
29	MF	(Iceland) ISL	Bjarni Aðalsteinsson
30	DF	(Iceland) ISL	Bjarki Þór Viðarsson
35	FW	(Iceland) ISL	Frosti Brynjólfsson
49	MF	(Iceland) ISL	Áki Sölvason

=== Out on loan ===
Note: Flags indicate national team as defined under FIFA eligibility rules; some limited exceptions apply. Players may hold more than one non-FIFA nationality.

No.	Pos.	Nation	Player
—	MF	(Iceland) ISL	Tómas Veigar Kristjánsson (at KF until 1 October 2017)
—	DF	(Iceland) ISL	Kristján Freyr Óðinsson (at Dalvík/Reynir until 1 October 2017)

== Transfers ==
=== Winter ===
In: Note: Flags indicate national team as defined under FIFA eligibility rules; some limited exceptions apply. Players may hold more than one non-FIFA nationality.

No.	Pos.	Nation	Player
28	FW	(Denmark) DEN	Emil Lyng (from (Denmark) Silkeborg)
19	DF	(Montenegro) MNE	Darko Bulatovic (from (Serbia) Cukaricki)
8	FW	(Iceland) ISL	Steinþór Freyr Þorsteinsson (from (Norway) Sandnes Ulf)
11	FW	(Iceland) ISL	Ásgeir Sigurgeirsson (from (Norway) Stabæk)
5	DF	(Iceland) ISL	Guðmann Þórisson (from (Iceland) FH)

Out: Note: Flags indicate national team as defined under FIFA eligibility rules; some limited exceptions apply. Players may hold more than one non-FIFA nationality.

No.	Pos.	Nation	Player
10	FW	(Croatia) CRO	Juraj Grizelj (to (Iceland) Keflavík)
17	FW	(Iceland) ISL	Pétur Heiðar Kristjánsson (to (Iceland) Magni)

=== Summer ===
In: Note: Flags indicate national team as defined under FIFA eligibility rules; some limited exceptions apply. Players may hold more than one non-FIFA nationality.

No.	Pos.	Nation	Player
26	DF	(Croatia) CRO	Vedran Turkalj (from (Slovenia) NK Aluminij)

Out: Note: Flags indicate national team as defined under FIFA eligibility rules; some limited exceptions apply. Players may hold more than one non-FIFA nationality.

No.	Pos.	Nation	Player
2	DF	(Iceland) ISL	Balvin Ólafsson (to (Iceland) Magni)
6	MF	(Iceland) ISL	Halldór Hermann Jónsson (to (Iceland) Magni)

== Competitions ==
=== Úrvalsdeild ===
==== Results summary ====
Overall								Home						Away					
Pld	W	D	L	GF	GA	GD	Pts	W	D	L	GF	GA	GD	W	D	L	GF	GA	GD
22	7	8	7	37	31	+6	29	4	5	2	23	15	+8	3	3	5	14	16	−2

Last updated: 26 November 2017.
Source: see below

==== Results by round ====
Round	1	2	3	4	5	6	7	8	9	10	11	12	13	14	15	16	17	18	19	20	21	22
Ground	A	A	H	A	H	A	H	A	H	A	H	H	H	A	H	A	H	A	H	A	H	A
Result	W	D	W	L	D	W	D	L	L	L	W	L	D	D	D	W	W	L	D	D	W	L
Position	2	4	3	3	4	4	4	4	6	7	5	6	8	8	9	7	6	6	5	6	5	7

Updated to match(es) played on 26 November 2017. Source: see below
A = Away; H = Home; W = Win; D = Draw; L = Loss

==== Table ====
Pos	Team	Pld	W	D	L	GF	GA	GD	Pts	Qualification or relegation
1	Valur (C)	22	15	5	2	43	20	+23	50	Qualification for the Champions League first qualifying round
2	Stjarnan	22	10	8	4	46	25	+21	38	Qualification for the Europa League first qualifying round
3	FH	22	9	8	5	33	25	+8	35	Qualification for the Europa League first qualifying round
4	KR	22	8	7	7	31	29	+2	31	
5	Grindavík	22	9	4	9	31	39	−8	31	
6	Breiðablik	22	9	3	10	34	35	−1	30	
7	KA	22	7	8	7	37	31	+6	29	
8	Víkingur R.	22	7	6	9	32	36	−4	27	
9	ÍBV	22	7	4	11	32	38	−6	25	Qualification for the Europa League first qualifying round (Note: ÍBV qualified for the Europa League first qualifying round by winning the 2017 Icelandic Cup.)
10	Fjölnir	22	6	7	9	32	40	−8	25	
11	Víkingur Ó. (R)	22	6	4	12	24	44	−20	22	Relegation to 1. deild karla
12	ÍA (R)	22	3	8	11	28	41	−13	17	Relegation to 1. deild karla

Source: KSÍ (in Icelandic), Soccerway
Rules for classification: 1) Points; 2) Goal difference; 3) Goals scored; 4) Head-to-head points; 5) Head-to-head goal difference; 6) Head-to-head goals scored; 7) Head-to-head away goals scored; 8) Play-off (only for deciding champion); 9) Draw.
(C) Champions; (R) Relegated

=== Icelandic cup ===
17 May 2017 Third round	Knattspyrnufélag Akureyrar	1-3	Íþróttafélag Reykjavíkur	Akureyri
18:00 CEST (UTC+2)	Elfar Árni Aðalsteinsson 51'; Ívar Örn Árnason (yellow card) 83'	Report	Jón Gísli Ström 7'; Viktor Örn Guðmundsson (yellow card) 31'; Jóhann Arnar Sigurþórsson (yellow card) 50'; Andri Jónasson 36'; Jón Arnar Barðdal 111 '	Stadium: KA-völlur; Attendance: 241; Referee: Þóroddur Hjaltalín

== Squad statistics ==
As of match played 26 November 2017

=== Appearances and goals ===
No.	Pos	Nat	Player	Total		Úrvalsdeild		Icelandic Cup	
No.	Pos	Nat	Player	Apps	Goals	Apps	Goals	Apps	Goals
1	GK	(Iceland) ISL	Aron Dagur Jóhannsson	2	0	1	0	1	0
3	DF	(England) ENG	Callum Williams	20	0	20	0	0	0
4	MF	(Iceland) ISL	Ólafur Aron Pétursson	16	0	4+11	0	1	0
5	DF	(Iceland) ISL	Guðmann Þórisson	9	0	8+1	0	0	0
7	MF	(Iceland) ISL	Almarr Ormarsson	21	3	19+1	3	1	0
8	FW	(Iceland) ISL	Steinþór Freyr Þorsteinsson	17	0	8+9	0	0	0
9	FW	(Iceland) ISL	Elfar Árni Aðalsteinsson	23	10	19+3	9	0+1	1
10	FW	(Iceland) ISL	Hallgrímur Mar Steingrímsson	23	7	22	7	1	0
11	FW	(Iceland) ISL	Ásgeir Sigurgeirsson	23	5	19+3	5	0+1	0
16	DF	(Iceland) ISL	Davíð Rúnar Bjarnason	9	1	3+6	1	0	0
19	DF	(Montenegro) MNE	Darko Bulatovic	18	1	18	1	0	0
20	MF	(Serbia) SRB	Aleksandar Trninic	20	0	20	0	0	0
21	DF	(Iceland) ISL	Ívar Örn Árnason	7	0	3+3	0	1	0
22	DF	(Iceland) ISL	Hrannar Björn Steingrímsson	20	1	17+2	1	1	0
23	GK	(Serbia) SRB	Srdjan Rajkovic	21	0	21	0	0	0
24	MF	(Iceland) ISL	Daníel Hafsteinsson	9	0	0+8	0	1	0
25	MF	(England) ENG	Archange Nkumu	12	0	6+5	0	1	0
26	DF	(Croatia) CRO	Vedran Turkalj	10	1	10	1	0	0
28	FW	(Denmark) DEN	Emil Lyng	21	9	19+1	9	1	0
30	DF	(Iceland) ISL	Bjarki Þór Viðarsson	11	0	5+5	0	1	0
49	MF	(Iceland) ISL	Áki Sölvason	1	0	0	0	0+1	0
Players who left KA during the season:
2	DF	(Iceland) ISL	Baldvin Ólafsson	5	0	0+4	0	1	0

=== Goal scorers ===
Place	Position	Nation	Number	Name	Úrvalsdeild	Icelandic Cup	Total
1	FW	(Iceland)	9	Elfar Árni Aðalsteinsson	9	1	10
2	FW	(Denmark)	28	Emil Lyng	9	0	9
3	MF	(Iceland)	10	Hallgrímur Mar Steingrímsson	7	0	7
4	FW	(Iceland)	11	Ásgeir Sigurgeirsson	5	0	5
5	MF	(Iceland)	7	Almarr Ormarsson	3	0	3
6	DF	(Iceland)	16	Davíð Rúnar Bjarnason	1	0	1
6	DF	(Montenegro)	19	Darko Bulatovic	1	0	1
6	DF	(Iceland)	22	Hrannar Björn Steingrímsson	1	0	1
6	DF	(Croatia)	26	Vedran Turkalj	1	0	1
				TOTALS	37	1	38

=== Disciplinary record ===
Number	Nation	Position	Name	Úrvalsdeild		Icelandic Cup			
Number	Nation	Position	Name	Booked	Sent off (straight red)	Booked	Sent off (straight red)	Booked	Sent off (straight red)
1	(Iceland)	GK	Aron Dagur Jóhannsson	0	0	0	0	0	0
2	(Iceland)	DF	Baldvin Ólafsson	0	0	0	0	0	0
3	(England)	DF	Callum Williams	2	1	0	0	2	1
4	(Iceland)	MF	Ólafur Aron Pétursson	3	0	0	0	3	0
5	(Iceland)	DF	Guðmann Þórisson	3	1	0	0	3	1
6	(Iceland)	MF	Halldór Hermann Jónsson	0	0	0	0	0	0
7	(Iceland)	MF	Almarr Ormarsson	2	0	0	0	2	0
8	(Iceland)	FW	Steinþór Freyr Þorsteinsson	2	0	0	0	2	0
9	(Iceland)	FW	Elfar Árni Aðalsteinsson	4	0	0	0	4	0
10	(Iceland)	FW	Hallgrímur Mar Steingrímsson	2	0	0	0	2	0
11	(Iceland)	FW	Ásgeir Sigurgeirsson	3	0	0	0	3	0
16	(Iceland)	DF	Davíð Rúnar Bjarnason	0	0	0	0	0	0
19	(Iceland)	DF	Darko Bulatovic	2	0	0	0	2	0
20	(Serbia)	MF	Aleksandar Trninic	6	1	0	0	6	1
21	(Iceland)	DF	Ívar Örn Árnason	1	0	1	0	2	0
22	(Iceland)	DF	Hrannar Björn Steingrímsson	3	0	0	0	3	0
23	(Serbia)	GK	Srdjan Rajkovic	1	0	0	0	1	0
24	(Iceland)	MF	Daníel Hafsteinsson	0	0	0	0	0	0
25	(England)	MF	Archange Nkumu	4	0	0	0	4	0
26	(Croatia)	DF	Vedran Turkalj	2	0	0	0	2	0
28	(Denmark)	FW	Emil Lyng	5	0	0	0	5	0
30	(Iceland)	DF	Bjarki Þór Viðarsson	2	1	0	0	2	1
			TOTALS	47	4	1	0	48	4
