= Gunnleifur Gunnleifsson =

Icelandic footballer

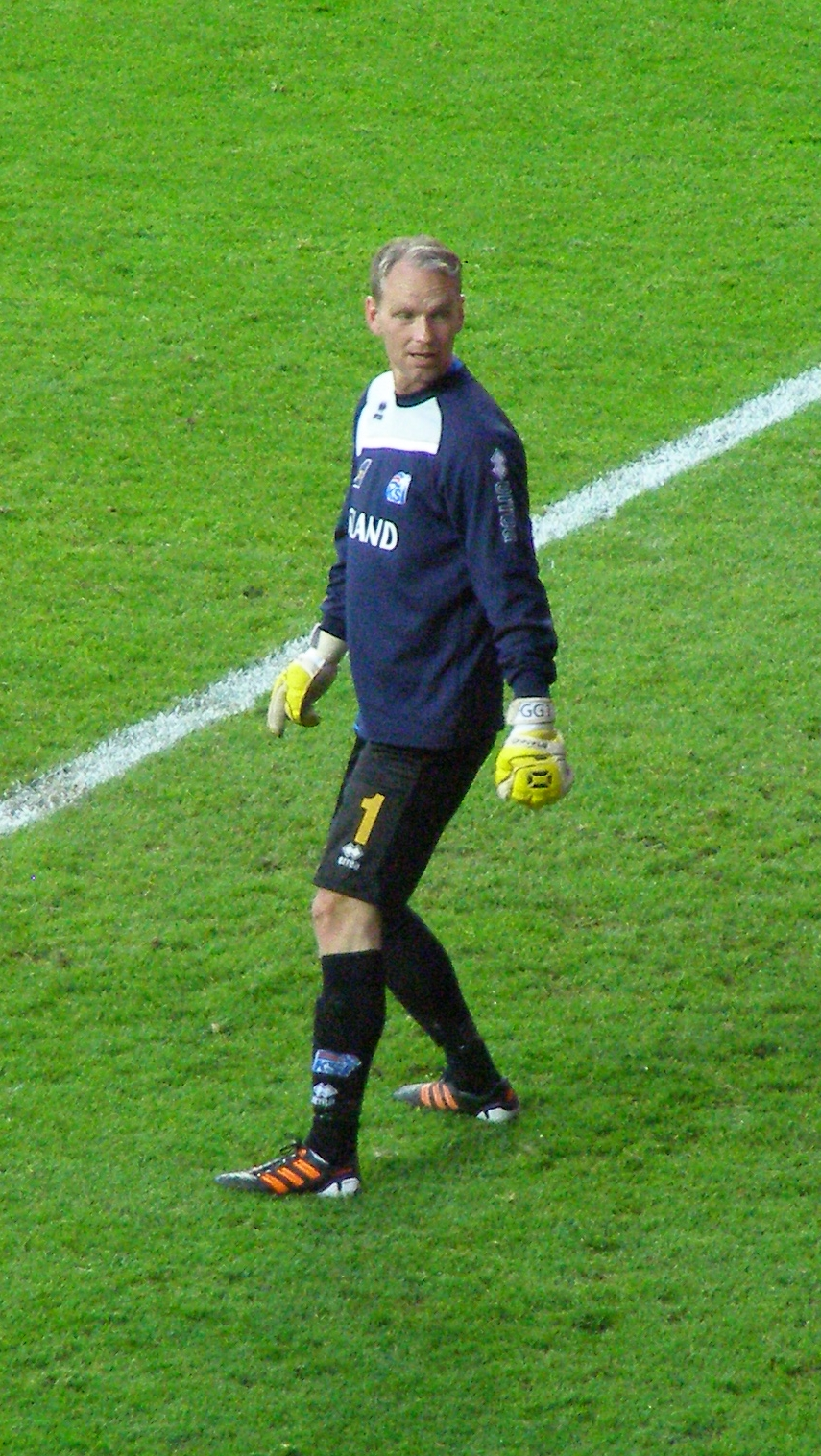
- Gunnleifsson playing for Iceland in 2012

Personal information
- Full name: Gunnleifur Vignir Gunnleifsson
- Date of birth: 14 July 1975 (age 51)
- Place of birth: Reykjavík, Iceland
- Height: 1.91 m (6 ft 3 in)
- Position: Goalkeeper

Youth career
- 1993–1995: HK Kópavogur

Senior career*
Years	Team	Apps	(Gls)
1995	HK Kópavogur	3	(0)
1996	KVA	16	(0)
1997	HK Kópavogur	18	(0)
1998–1999	KR Reykjavík	11	(0)
2000–2001	Keflavík	36	(0)
2002–2009	HK Kópavogur	137	(1)
2009	→ FC Vaduz (loan)	5	(0)
2010–2012	FH	65	(0)
2013–2020	Breiðablik	109	(0)
Total		400	(1)

International career
2000–2014	Iceland	26	(0)
- * Club domestic league appearances and goals

Gunnleifur Vignir Gunnleifsson (born 14 July 1975) is an Icelandic football former goalkeeper, who spent most of his career with Breiðablik and HK.

== Career ==
Gunnleifur started his career with local club HK by making 3 appearances in the 1995 season as the club was relegated from the 1. deild karla to the 2. deild. He joined lower-league club KVA from Eskifjörður and Reyðarfjörður (later known as Fjarðabyggð) and was their 1st choice goalkeeper for the 1996 season as the club was promoted from the lowest league, the 3. deild, to the 2. deild. He then headed back to HK to be their main goalkeeper for the 1997 season in the 2. deild, as the club was promoted to the 1. deild again, along with Gunnleifur's former club KVA.

After impressing in the lower leagues he moved to Úrvalsdeild karla club KR where he played 10 of 18 games in the 1998 Úrvalsdeild, keeping a clean-sheet for seven games in a row, as well as keeping national team goalkeeper (8 games in the last year before that) Kristján Finnbogason out of the team as KR finished 2nd in the league. He only managed one game in the 1999 season where KR won their first Icelandic title for 31 years, moving to fellow Úrvalsdeild outfit Keflavík before the 2000 season as the club finished 6th, 2 points away from relegation, and again as they finished 6th in the 2001 season, this time 4 points away from relegation.

Despite having played every game of both seasons for Keflavík he transferred back to his local club, HK, before the 2002 2. deild season as the club was promoted to the 1. deild karla again. The club won the league by winning 15 of 18 games and only losing once, with Gunnleifur even managing to score in the last game of the season against Selfoss from a penalty in the 70th minute to make the score 6–1, with the game finishing 7–2. He remained the first choice for HK as the club finished 8th in 2003, 3rd in 2004 two points from a promotion place, 7th in 2005 and as the club finished 2nd in 2006 and were promoted to the Úrvalsdeild for the first time.

There he played every game in 2007 as HK finished 9th, two points away from relegation, and every game but one in 2008 as the club was relegated in 11th place. Gunnleifur joined Liechtenstein based Swiss Super League club FC Vaduz on loan on 13 February 2009 in the Icelandic off-season. He didn't return from the loan until late July, in the middle of the Icelandic season, and played 8 games as HK finished 3rd in the 2009 1. deild.

Before the 2010 Úrvalsdeild season, as he was now the main goalkeeper for the national team, he transferred to Icelandic champions FH. The club lost out on the title on goal difference to Breiðablik in his first season and finished 2nd again in the 2011 season, three points behind the champions. In the 2012 season he won his first Icelandic title (besides featuring in one game in a title-winning 1999 season) as FH finished 1st, 13 points ahead of Breiðablik.

After that season, as FH weren't ready to offer him more than a 1-year contract, he transferred to Breiðablik before the 2013 Úrvalsdeild season and signed a 3-year contract. The move wasn't popular with HK fans, as HK and Breiðablik are the two major teams from Kópavogur and as such have a rivalry.

On 20 November 2020, Gunnleifur announced his retirement from football.

== International career ==
During his time with Keflavík he played his first three international games, his debut coming as an 83rd-minute substitute in a 5–0 friendly victory against Malta in July 2000. He featured as the starting goalkeeper in two games in South America in January 2001, against Uruguay and Chile, but didn't feature after that until after his 2008 season with HK. After that he featured in 18 games from his start against the Netherlands in October 2008 until his start against Israel in November 2010, then not featuring in 2011 at all. He played three games in 2012, but was mostly a substitute for Hannes Þór Halldórsson.

== Honours ==
KVA

- 3. deild: 1996

HK

- 2. deild: 1997, 2002

FH

- Icelandic Cup: 2010
- Úrvalsdeild: 2012
