= 2012 2. deild karla =

2. deild karla
- Season: 2012
- Champions: Völsungur
- Promoted: Völsungur; KF
- Relegated: KFR; Fjarðabyggð
- Matches played: 132
- Goals scored: 445 (3.37 per match)
- Top goalscorer: Bessi Víðisson and Þórður Birgisson (18)
- Biggest home win: Dalvík/Reynir 9–0 KFR
- Biggest away win: KFR 1–5 HK; KFR 0–4 KV
- Highest scoring: Dalvík/Reynir 9–0 KFR

The 2012 2. deild karla was the 47th season of third-tier football in Iceland. The league, which was contested by 12 clubs from across Iceland, began on 11 May 2012 and ended on 22 September 2012.

The champions of the 2. deild karla in the 2012 season were Völsungur, who sealed the title on the final day of the season with a 2–1 home win against Njarðvík. Völsungur were consequently promoted to the 1. deild karla for the 2013 season along with runners-up KF, who finished ahead of third-placed HK because of their superior goal difference. At the opposite end of the table KFR, who had been promoted to the 2. deild for the 2012 campaign, finished bottom of the league after winning only one of their 22 matches. Also relegated to the 3. deild karla (which will be played in a new format in 2013) were Fjarðabyggð, who ended the season five points from safety.

There were two joint top goalscorers for the season who both scored 18 goals in the league: KF striker Þórður Birgisson and Bessi Víðisson of Dalvík/Reynir, who reached the tally with a five-goal haul in the 9–0 victory over KFR on the last day of the campaign. Bessi played fewer games though and as such was named as the top scorer.

== Teams ==
A total of 12 clubs contested the 2012 2. deild karla, eight of which had played in the division during the previous campaign. The changes from the 2011 season were:

- Grótta and HK were relegated from the 1. deild karla
- KFR and KV were promoted from the 3. deild karla

=== Club information ===
Location of teams in the 2013 2. deild karla

Team	Location	Stadium	Manager	2011 season
Afturelding	Mosfellsbær	Varmárvöllur	Þorsteinn Magnússon	4th
Dalvík/Reynir	Dalvík/Árskógsströnd	Dalvíkurvöllur	Þórir Áskelsson	5th
Fjarðabyggð	Fjarðabyggð	Eskifjarðarvöllur	Heimir Þorsteinsson	7th
Grótta	Seltjarnarnes	Gróttuvöllur	Sigurður Helgason	1. deild
Hamar	Hveragerði	Grýluvöllur	Salih Porca	9th
HK	Kópavogur	Kópavogsvöllur	Ragnar Gíslason	1. deild
KF	Fjallabyggð	Ólafsfjarðarvöllur	Lárus Sigurðsson	6th
KFR	Hvolsvöllur	Hvolsvöllur	Ómar Valdimarsson	3. deild
KV	Reykjavík	KR-völlur	Halldór Árnason & Páll Kristjánsson	3. deild
Njarðvík	Njarðvík	Njarðtaksvöllurinn	Gunnar Jónsson	3rd
Reynir S.	Sandgerði	N1-völlurinn	Jens Sævarsson	8th
Völsungur	Húsavík	Húsavíkurvöllur	Dragan Stojanovic	10th

== Statistics ==
=== League table ===
Pos	Team	Pld	W	D	L	GF	GA	GD	Pts	Promotion or relegation
1	Völsungur (C, P)	22	14	4	4	36	21	+15	46	Promotion to 2013 1. deild karla
2	KF (P)	22	12	7	3	51	23	+28	43	Promotion to 2013 1. deild karla
3	HK	22	13	4	5	43	27	+16	43	
4	KV	22	12	4	6	43	26	+17	40	
5	Afturelding	22	13	1	8	50	46	+4	40	
6	Dalvík/Reynir	22	11	3	8	38	25	+13	36	
7	Reynir S.	22	9	4	9	35	41	−6	31	
8	Njarðvík	22	8	6	8	31	35	−4	30	
9	Hamar	22	5	6	11	36	41	−5	21	
10	Grótta	22	5	5	12	31	41	−10	20	
11	Fjarðabyggð (R)	22	4	3	15	31	48	−17	15	Relegation to 2013 3. deild karla
12	KFR (R)	22	1	3	18	20	71	−51	6	Relegation to 2013 3. deild karla

Updated to match(es) played on 22 September 2012. Source: ksi.is (in Icelandic)
Rules for classification: 1) points; 2) goal difference; 3) number of goals scored.
(C) Champions; (P) Promoted; (R) Relegated

=== Results ===
Each team play every opponent once home and away for a total of 22 matches.

Home \ Away	AFT	DVR	KFF	GRÓ	HAM	HK	KF	KFR	KV	NJA	REY	VÖL
Afturelding		3–0	3–2	4–2	2–1	1–2	1–3	4–2	3–2	2–2	5–3	1–2
Dalvík/Reynir	1–3		2–0	1–0	4–2	0–3	2–0	9–0	0–1	2–0	4–1	2–0
Fjarðabyggð	2–3	0–1		4–0	3–1	2–5	0–1	1–1	1–4	5–3	2–2	0–1
Grótta	2–5	0–0	5–2		2–0	0–1	1–1	3–1	1–3	4–1	0–0	2–3
Hamar	4–0	2–1	2–2	3–3		1–4	2–2	5–0	1–1	1–0	1–2	2–3
HK	3–1	1–0	2–0	1–0	0–0		0–3	4–2	1–4	1–3	3–1	1–0
KF	3–0	4–1	4–0	4–1	4–1	2–2		1–0	3–1	4–0	4–0	2–2
KFR	4–0	2–4	1–3	1–3	1–1	1–5	3–3		0–4	0–3	0–4	1–4
KV	1–2	1–3	1–0	2–1	2–1	1–1	3–1	4–0		1–1	0–1	2–1
Njarðvík	0–2	1–0	2–1	1–0	2–1	2–2	1–1	3–0	0–0		0–2	2–2
Reynir S.	1–3	1–1	3–1	3–1	1–3	2–1	1–1	1–0	2–5	2–3		2–1
Völsungur	4–2	0–0	1–0	0–0	2–1	1–0	1–0	2–0	2–0	2–1	2–0	

Updated to match(es) played on 22 September 2012. Source: ksi.is (in Icelandic)
Legend: Blue = home team win; Yellow = draw; Red = away team win.

=== Top goalscorers ===
As of 22 September 2012.

Rank	Player	Club	Goals	Matches	Ratio
1	Bessi Víðisson	Dalvík/Reynir	18	19	0.95
2	Þórður Birgisson	KF	18	20	0.90
3	Grétar Ólafur Hjartarson	Reynir S.	11	21	0.52
4	Wentzel Steinarr Kamban	Afturelding	11	22	0.50
4	Birgir Magnússon	HK	11	22	0.50
6	Magnús Bernhard Gíslason	Grótta	9	10	0.90
7	Jónmundur Grétarsson	Grótta	9	13	0.69
8	Aron Már Smárason	Hamar	9	18	0.50
9	Guðmundur Gísli Gunnarsson	Reynir S.	9	22	0.41

== Awards ==
On 5 October 2012, an awards evening was held at which the 2. deild karla Player of the Year, Most Promising Player, Manager of the Year and Team of the Year were announced. The team consisted of eleven players and seven substitutes and was voted for by the managers and captains of each of the clubs in the division.

=== Player of the Year ===
The Player of the Year accolade was awarded to Serbian goalkeeper Dejan Pešić, of Völsungur. The 35-year-old, playing his first season in Icelandic football, appeared in every match for the side as they won the division. Pešić, who played in the UEFA Champions League with Red Star Belgrade during his earlier career, conceded less than a goal per game over the season and was voted one of the best goalkeepers in all of Iceland in 2012.

=== Most Promising Player ===
Hrannar Björn Steingrímsson, the Völsungur midfielder, was named the Most Promising Player of the 2012 season. Aged 20, he was made club captain following the departure of Elfar Árni Aðalsteinsson to Úrvalsdeild side Breiðablik at the end of the previous summer. Despite missing the opening weeks of the campaign through injury, Hrannar returned to the team in the 4–2 win over Afturelding on 2 June and went on to score 6 goals in 19 appearances over the remainder of the season, including a goal direct from a free-kick in the 2–1 final-day victory over Njarðvík that sealed the league title for Völsungur.

=== Manager of the Year ===
Serbian coach Dragan Stojanovic was awarded Manager of the Year after leading Völsungur to the 2. deild karla championship, thereby returning the club to the second tier of Icelandic football for the first time since relegation from the 1. deild karla in 2005. The former Fjarðabyggð, Þór Akureyri and Þór/KA manager brought a number of fellow Serbian players to the club during the close season including Dejan Pešić and Marko Blagojević, and guided the team to victory in nine of their eleven home matches, conceding only four goals in the process.

=== Team of the Year ===
Goalkeeper
Dejan Pešić (Völsungur)
Defenders
Halldór Bogason (KV), Milos Glogovac (KF), Marko Blagojević (Völsungur)
Midfielders
Farid Zato (HK), Hrannar Björn Steingrímsson (Völsungur), Nenad Živanović (KF), Bessi Víðisson (Dalvík/Reynir)
Forwards
Gunnar Kristjánsson (KV), Þórður Birgisson (KF), Wentzel Steinarr Kamban (Afturelding)
Substitutes
Beitir Ólafsson (HK), Aron Bjarnason (HK), Tómas Agnarsson (KV), Hermann Albertsson (Dalvík/Reynir), Halldór Fannar Júlíusson (Völsungur), Birgir Magnússon (HK), Grétar Hjartarson (Reynir S.)
