= 1996 2. deild karla =

Icelandic football league season

The 1996 season of 2. deild karla was the 31st season of third-tier football in Iceland.

== League table ==
Pos	Team	Pld	W	D	L	GF	GA	GD	Pts	Promotion or relegation
1	Dalvík (C, P)	18	11	4	3	47	30	+17	37	Promoted to 1997 1. deild karla
2	Reynir S. (P)	18	10	4	4	45	26	+19	34	Promoted to 1997 1. deild karla
3	Víðir	18	10	2	6	43	32	+11	32	
4	Þróttur N.	18	8	6	4	39	27	+12	30	
5	HK	18	8	3	7	38	36	+2	27	
6	Selfoss	18	7	5	6	39	46	−7	26	
7	Fjölnir	18	5	3	10	28	39	−11	18	
8	Ægir	18	4	5	9	33	36	−3	17	
9	Höttur (R)	18	3	6	9	26	47	−21	15	Relegated to 1997 3. deild karla
10	Grótta (R)	18	3	5	10	32	51	−19	14	Relegated to 1997 3. deild karla

Rules for classification: 1) points; 2) goal difference; 3) number of goals scored.
(C) Champions; (P) Promoted; (R) Relegated

== Top scorers ==
Scorer	Goals	Team
(Iceland) Sævar Þór Gíslason	17	Selfoss
(Iceland) Örvar Eiríksson	17	Dalvík
(Iceland) Steindór Elísson	13	HK
(Iceland) Grétar Ólafur Hjartarson	13	Reynir S.
(Iceland) Marteinn Hilmarsson	12	Þróttur N.
(Iceland) Sigurður Valur Árnason	12	Höttur
