= 2001 1. deild karla =

Icelandic football league season

The 2001 season of 1. deild karla was the 47th season of second-tier football in Iceland.

== League table ==
Pos	Team	Pld	W	D	L	GF	GA	GD	Pts	Promotion or relegation
1	Þór A. (C, P)	18	13	2	3	53	19	+34	41	Promoted to 2002 Úrvalsdeild
2	KA (P)	18	11	4	3	43	21	+22	37	Promoted to 2002 Úrvalsdeild
3	Þróttur R.	18	10	5	3	32	19	+13	35	
4	Stjarnan	18	9	5	4	41	23	+18	32	
5	Leiftur	18	7	2	9	27	30	−3	23	
6	Víkingur R.	18	6	4	8	32	31	+1	22	
7	Dalvík	18	7	1	10	30	42	−12	22	
8	ÍR	18	4	8	6	31	41	−10	21 (Note: 1 bonus point?)	
9	Tindastóll (R)	18	4	4	10	25	44	−19	16	Relegated to 2002 2. deild
10	KS (R)	18	0	3	15	14	58	−44	3	Relegated to 2002 2. deild

Rules for classification: 1) points; 2) goal difference; 3) number of goals scored.
(C) Champions; (P) Promoted; (R) Relegated

== Top scorers ==
Scorer	Goals	Team
(Iceland) Hreinn Hringsson	17	KA
(Iceland) Garðar Jóhannsson	17	Stjarnan
(Iceland) Orri Hjaltalín	16	Þór A.
(Iceland) Jóhann Þórhallsson	13	Þór A.
(Iceland) Sumarliði Árnason	13	Víkingur R.
(Iceland) Arnar Þór Valsson	11	ÍR
(Iceland) Þorvaldur Makan Sigbjörnsson	10	KA
(Iceland) Davíð Þór Rúnarsson	9	Tindastóll
(Iceland) Brynjar Sverrisson	9	Þróttur R.
(Brazil) Alexandre Barreto dos Santos	9	Leiftur
