= Hjartarson =

Hjartarson is a surname of Icelandic origin, meaning son of Hjörtur. In Icelandic names, the name is not strictly a surname, but a patronymic. The name refers to:

- Grétar Hjartarson (born 1977), Icelandic footballer
- Jóhann Hjartarson (born 1963), Icelandic chess grandmaster
- Snorri Hjartarson (1906–1986), Icelandic poet
