= UEFA Euro 2012 qualifying Group H =

Football tournament qualifying stage

This page shows the standings and results for Group H of the UEFA Euro 2012 qualifying tournament.

== Standings ==
Pos	Team	Pld	W	D	L	GF	GA	GD	Pts	Qualification	(Denmark)	(Portugal)	(Norway)	(Iceland)	(Cyprus)
1	Denmark	8	6	1	1	15	6	+9	19	Qualify for final tournament	—	2–1	2–0	1–0	2–0
2	Portugal	8	5	1	2	21	12	+9	16 (Note: Tied on head-to-head results. Overall goal difference was used as the tiebreaker.)	Advance to play-offs	3–1	—	1–0	5–3	4–4
3	Norway	8	5	1	2	10	7	+3	16		1–1	1–0	—	1–0	3–1
4	Iceland	8	1	1	6	6	14	−8	4		0–2	1–3	1–2	—	1–0
5	Cyprus	8	0	2	6	7	20	−13	2		1–4	0–4	1–2	0–0	—

Source: UEFA
Rules for classification: Qualification tiebreakers

== Matches ==
Group H fixtures were to be negotiated between the participants in a meeting held in Copenhagen on 8 March. After that meeting proved inconclusive, the fixture list was determined by a random draw at the XXXIV Ordinary UEFA Congress in Tel Aviv, Israel, on 25 March.

3 September 2010
19:00 UTC±0

Iceland	1–2	Norway
Helguson 38'	Report	Hangeland 59'; Abdellaoue 75'

Laugardalsvöllur, Reykjavík
Attendance: 6,137
Referee: Luca Banti (Italy)
3 September 2010
20:45 UTC+1

Portugal	4–4	Cyprus
Almeida 8'; Meireles 29'; Danny 50'; Fernandes 60'	Report	Aloneftis 3'; Konstantinou 11'; Okkas 57'; Avraam 89'

Estádio D. Afonso Henriques, Guimarães
Attendance: 9,100
Referee: Mark Clattenburg (England)

7 September 2010
20:15 UTC+2

Denmark	1–0	Iceland
Kahlenberg 90+1'	Report

Parken Stadium, Copenhagen
Attendance: 18,908
Referee: Dougie McDonald (Scotland)
7 September 2010
20:30 UTC+2

Norway	1–0	Portugal
Huseklepp 21'	Report

Ullevaal Stadion, Oslo
Attendance: 24,535
Referee: Laurent Duhamel (France)

8 October 2010
21:00 UTC+3

Cyprus	1–2	Norway
Okkas 58'	Report	J. Riise 2'; Carew 42'

Antonis Papadopoulos Stadium, Larnaca
Attendance: 7,648
Referee: Serge Gumienny (Belgium)
8 October 2010
20:45 UTC+1

Portugal	3–1	Denmark
Nani 29', 31'; Ronaldo 85'	Report	Carvalho 80' (o.g.)

Estádio do Dragão, Porto
Attendance: 27,117
Referee: Eric Braamhaar (Netherlands)

12 October 2010
20:15 UTC+2

Denmark	2–0	Cyprus
Rasmussen 47'; Lorentzen 81'	Report

Parken Stadium, Copenhagen
Attendance: 15,544
Referee: César Muñiz Fernández (Spain)
12 October 2010
19:45 UTC±0

Iceland	1–3	Portugal
Helguson 17'	Report	Ronaldo 3'; Meireles 27'; Postiga 72'

Laugardalsvöllur, Reykjavík
Attendance: 9,767
Referee: Thomas Einwaller (Austria)

26 March 2011
20:00 UTC+2

Cyprus	0–0	Iceland
	Report

GSP Stadium, Nicosia
Attendance: 2,088
Referee: Darko Čeferin (Slovenia)
26 March 2011
20:00 UTC+1

Norway	1–1	Denmark
Huseklepp 81'	Report	Rommedahl 27'

Ullevaal Stadion, Oslo
Attendance: 24,828
Referee: Gianluca Rocchi (Italy)

4 June 2011
18:45 UTC±0

Iceland	0–2	Denmark
	Report	Schøne 60'; Eriksen 75'

Laugardalsvöllur, Reykjavík
Attendance: 7,629
Referee: Fırat Aydınus (Turkey)
4 June 2011
21:00 UTC+1

Portugal	1–0	Norway
Postiga 53'	Report

Estádio da Luz, Lisbon
Attendance: 47,829
Referee: Cüneyt Çakır (Turkey)

2 September 2011
20:00 UTC+2

Norway	1–0	Iceland
Abdellaoue 88' (pen.)	Report

Ullevaal Stadion, Oslo
Attendance: 22,381
Referee: Ovidiu Alin Hategan (Romania)
2 September 2011
21:45 UTC+3

Cyprus	0–4	Portugal
	Report	Ronaldo 35' (pen.), 83'; Almeida 84'; Danny 90+2'

GSP Stadium, Nicosia
Attendance: 15,444
Referee: Gianluca Rocchi (Italy)

6 September 2011
20:15 UTC+2

Denmark	2–0	Norway
Bendtner 24', 44'	Report

Parken Stadium, Copenhagen
Attendance: 37,167
Referee: Stéphane Lannoy (France)
6 September 2011
18:45 UTC±0

Iceland	1–0	Cyprus
Sigþórsson 5'	Report

Laugardalsvöllur, Reykjavík
Attendance: 5,267
Referee: Boško Jovanetić (Serbia)

7 October 2011
21:30 UTC+3

Cyprus	1–4	Denmark
Avraam 45+1'	Report	Jacobsen 7'; Rommedahl 11', 22'; Krohn-Dehli 20'

GSP Stadium, Nicosia
Attendance: 2,408
Referee: Marijo Strahonja (Croatia)
7 October 2011
21:00 UTC+1

Portugal	5–3	Iceland
Nani 13', 21'; Postiga 45'; Moutinho 81'; Eliseu 87'	Report	Jónasson 48', 68'; G. Sigurðsson 90+3' (pen.)

Estádio do Dragão, Porto
Attendance: 35,715
Referee: Bas Nijhuis (Netherlands)

11 October 2011
20:15 UTC+2

Norway	3–1	Cyprus
Pedersen 25'; Carew 34'; Høgli 65'	Report	Okkas 42'

Ullevaal Stadion, Oslo
Attendance: 13,490
Referee: William Collum (Scotland)
11 October 2011
20:15 UTC+2

Denmark	2–1	Portugal
Krohn-Dehli 13'; Bendtner 63'	Report	Ronaldo 90+2'

Parken Stadium, Copenhagen
Attendance: 37,012
Referee: Nicola Rizzoli (Italy)

== Goalscorers ==
There were 59 goals scored in 20 matches, for an average of 2.95 goals per match.

5 goals

- (Portugal national football team) Cristiano Ronaldo

4 goals

- (Portugal national football team) Nani

3 goals

- (Cyprus national football team) Ioannis Okkas
- (Denmark national football team) Nicklas Bendtner
- (Denmark national football team) Dennis Rommedahl
- (Portugal national football team) Hélder Postiga

2 goals

- (Cyprus national football team) Andreas Avraam
- (Denmark national football team) Michael Krohn-Dehli
- (Iceland national football team) Heiðar Helguson
- (Iceland national football team) Hallgrímur Jónasson
- (Norway national football team) Mohammed Abdellaoue
- (Norway national football team) John Carew
- (Norway national football team) Erik Huseklepp
- (Portugal national football team) Hugo Almeida
- (Portugal national football team) Danny
- (Portugal national football team) Raul Meireles

1 goal

- (Cyprus national football team) Efstathios Aloneftis
- (Cyprus national football team) Michalis Konstantinou
- (Denmark national football team) Christian Eriksen
- (Denmark national football team) Lars Jacobsen
- (Denmark national football team) Thomas Kahlenberg
- (Denmark national football team) Kasper Lorentzen
- (Denmark national football team) Morten Rasmussen
- (Denmark national football team) Lasse Schöne
- (Iceland national football team) Kolbeinn Sigþórsson
- (Iceland national football team) Gylfi Sigurðsson
- (Norway national football team) Brede Hangeland
- (Norway national football team) Tom Høgli
- (Norway national football team) Morten Gamst Pedersen
- (Norway national football team) John Arne Riise
- (Portugal national football team) Eliseu
- (Portugal national football team) Manuel Fernandes
- (Portugal national football team) João Moutinho

1 own goal

- (Portugal national football team) Ricardo Carvalho (against Denmark)

== Discipline ==
Pos	Player	Country	Yellow card	Red card	Suspended for match(es)	Reason
DF	Siniša Dobrašinović	Cyprus	3	1	vs Iceland (6 September 2011)	Sent off in a UEFA Euro 2012 qualifying match
DF	Eggert Jónsson	Iceland	3	0	vs Denmark (4 June 2011)	Booked in 2 UEFA Euro 2012 qualifying matches
MF	Constantinos Makrides	Cyprus	2	0	vs Norway (11 October 2011)	Booked in 2 UEFA Euro 2012 qualifying matches
DF	Giorgos Merkis	Cyprus	2	0	—	Booked in 2 UEFA Euro 2012 qualifying matches
MF	Savvas Poursaitidis	Cyprus	2	0	vs Iceland (26 March 2011)	Booked in 2 UEFA Euro 2012 qualifying matches
MF	Marinos Satsias	Cyprus	2	0	vs Iceland (26 March 2011)	Booked in 2 UEFA Euro 2012 qualifying matches
MF	Michael Silberbauer	Denmark	2	0	—	Booked in 2 UEFA Euro 2012 qualifying matches
MF	Rúrik Gíslason	Iceland	2	0	vs Cyprus (6 September 2011)	Booked in 2 UEFA Euro 2012 qualifying matches
GK	Stefán Logi Magnússon	Iceland	2	0	vs Cyprus (6 September 2011)	Booked in 2 UEFA Euro 2012 qualifying matches
DF	Kristján Örn Sigurðsson	Iceland	2	0	vs Norway (2 September 2011)	Booked in 2 UEFA Euro 2012 qualifying matches
MF	Ólafur Ingi Skúlason	Iceland	2	0	vs Norway (2 September 2011)	Booked in 2 UEFA Euro 2012 qualifying matches
MF	Brede Hangeland	Norway	2	0	vs Cyprus (11 October 2011)	Booked in 2 UEFA Euro 2012 qualifying matches
DF	Ricardo Costa	Portugal	0	0	vs Cyprus (3 September 2010)	Sent off in a 2010 FIFA World Cup match
