= Steingrímur Jóhannesson =

Icelandic footballer (1973–2012)

Personal information
- Date of birth: 14 June 1973
- Place of birth: Vestmannaeyjar, Iceland
- Date of death: 1 March 2012 (aged 38)
- Place of death: Reykjavík, Iceland
- Height: 1.80 m (5 ft 11 in)
- Position: Forward

Senior career*
Years	Team	Apps	(Gls)
1991–2000	ÍBV	150	(62)
2001–2002	Fylkir	32	(8)
2003–2005	ÍBV	39	(10)
2004	→ KFS (feeder club)	1	(0)
2006	UMF Selfoss	16	(5)
2007–2008	KFS	9	(8)

International career
1994–1995	Iceland U21	2	(0)
1998	Iceland	1	(0)
- * Club domestic league appearances and goals

Steingrímur Jóhannesson (14 June 1973 – 1 March 2012) was an Icelandic international footballer who played as a striker. During a playing career spanning 17 years, he represented ÍBV, Fylkir, Selfoss and KFS. In total, he made 221 appearances in the Icelandic top flight, scoring 80 goals. He was the competition's top goalscorer in the 1998 and 1999 seasons, scoring 16 and 12 goals respectively.

Steingrímur was selected to represent the Iceland national football team on one occasion, coming on as a substitute in the 1–1 draw with South Africa on 6 June 1998. He also made two appearances for the Iceland under-21 team.

Outside of football, Steingrímur worked as an electrician. He was married to Jóna Dís Kristjánsdóttir and the couple had two children, Kristjana María and Jóhanna Rún. Steingrímur died on 1 March 2012 in the Landspítali hospital in Reykjavík following a battle with cancer.

== Honours ==
ÍBV

- Úrvalsdeild: 1997, 1998
- Bikarkeppni: 1998

Fylkir

- Bikarkeppni: 2001, 2002
