= Pétur Björn Jónsson =

Icelandic footballer (born 1971)

Pétur Jónsson
Personal information
- Full name: Pétur Björn Jónsson
- Date of birth: 29 October 1971 (age 55)
- Position: Midfielder

Senior career*
Years	Team	Apps	(Gls)
1991	ÍR	14	(0)
1992–1997	Leiftur	98	(35)
1998–1999	Hammarby	8	(0)
2000	KA	17	(10)
2001	Fylkir	15	(3)
2002–2003	Fjölnir	27	(20)
Total		179	(68)
- * Club domestic league appearances and goals

Pétur Björn Jónsson (born 20 October 1971) is an Icelandic former professional footballer who played as a midfielder.

In 1993, while a member of Leiftur, he led the Icelandic Cup in goals with 10 scored. After several seasons with Leiftur, He joined Hammarby in 1997 and played there to 1999. In November 1999, he joined Knattspyrnufélag Akureyrar.

== Personal life ==
Pétur is the son of former footballer Jón Pétursson who played 26 matches for the Iceland national team.

In 1980, Pétur appeared in the lead role in the Icelandic film Punktur punktur komma strik that was made after the book by Pétur Gunnarsson by the same name.
