= 2011 1. deild karla =

1. deild karla
- Season: 2011
- Champions: ÍA
- Relegated: Grótta & HK
- Matches: 132
- Goals: 389 (2.95 per match)
- Biggest home win: ÍA 6-0 Fjölnir
- Biggest away win: BÍ/Bolungarvík 0-6 ÍA & Þróttur R. 0-6 ÍA
- Highest scoring: Þróttur R. 7-2 Fjölnir

The 2011 season of 1. deild karla was the 57th season of second-tier football in Iceland.

== Stadia and locations ==
Location of teams in the 1. deild karla 2011

Team	Location	Stadium	Stadium capacity
BÍ/Bolungarvík	Ísafjörður	Torfnesvöllur	800
Fjölnir	Reykjavík	Fjölnisvöllur	1,098
Grótta	Seltjarnarnes	Gróttuvöllur	1,500
Haukar	Hafnarfjörður	Ásvellir	1,400
HK	Kópavogur	Kópavogsvöllur	5,501
ÍA	Akranes	Akranesvöllur	2,780
ÍR	Reykjavík	ÍR-Völlur	800
KA	Akureyri	Akureyrarvöllur	1,770
Leiknir R.	Reykjavík	Leiknisvöllur	1,300
Selfoss	Selfoss	Selfossvöllur	2,000
Víkingur Ó.	Ólafsvík	Ólafsvíkurvöllur	800
Þróttur R.	Reykjavík	Valbjarnarvöllur	2,000

== League table ==
Pos	Team	Pld	W	D	L	GF	GA	GD	Pts	Promotion or relegation
1	ÍA (C, P)	22	16	3	3	53	17	+36	51	Promotion to Úrvalsdeild
2	Selfoss (P)	22	15	2	5	44	22	+22	47	Promotion to Úrvalsdeild
3	Haukar	22	10	6	6	33	23	+10	36	
4	Víkingur Ólafsvík	22	10	4	8	35	26	+9	34	
5	Fjölnir	22	8	8	6	34	38	−4	32	
6	BÍ/Bolungarvík	22	9	4	9	27	37	−10	31	
7	Þróttur Reykjavík	22	9	3	10	34	45	−11	30	
8	KA	22	9	2	11	32	40	−8	29	
9	ÍR	22	6	4	12	27	42	−15	22	
10	Leiknir R.	22	5	5	12	31	32	−1	20	
11	Grótta (R)	22	4	8	10	16	29	−13	20	Relegation to 2. deild
12	HK (R)	22	3	7	12	23	38	−15	16	Relegation to 2. deild

Updated to match(es) played on 17 September 2011. Source: ksi.is (in Icelandic)
Rules for classification: 1) points; 2) goal difference; 3) number of goals scored.
(C) Champions; (P) Promoted; (R) Relegated

== Results ==
Each team play every opponent once home and away for a total of 22 matches.

Home \ Away	BÍB	FJÖ	GRÓ	HAU	HK	ÍA	ÍR	KAK	LRE	SEL	VÓL	ÞRÓ
BÍ/Bolungarvík		3–1	1–1	0–0	2–1	0–6	1–2	2–1	1–0	0–1	0–1	2–1
Fjölnir	1–1		0–0	0–0	2–2	1–1	2–3	3–0	4–3	0–1	2–0	3–2
Grótta	1–0	0–2		3–2	0–0	0–2	4–1	0–3	1–1	0–3	1–2	0–1
Haukar	1–2	0–0	0–0		1–1	0–1	3–2	1–2	3–0	2–1	1–0	3–3
HK	3–0	1–1	1–0	0–2		0–3	1–1	3–4	0–3	0–0	0–2	1–2
ÍA	1–2	6–0	2–1	0–2	2–1		3–1	5–0	2–0	2–1	1–1	1–0
ÍR	2–3	0–1	0–0	1–3	0–3	1–1		1–1	3–2	1–3	1–0	0–1
KA	3–0	1–4	1–0	0–2	2–1	1–4	3–0		0–2	1–2	4–3	4–1
Leiknir R.	0–1	3–0	1–2	1–2	1–1	4–1	1–2	0–0		1–1	2–3	5–1
Selfoss	4–3	2–3	4–0	3–2	4–2	1–2	2–1	3–0	1–0		3–1	0–1
Víkingur Ólafsvík	4–1	2–2	1–1	1–2	3–0	0–1	3–1	2–1	0–0	0–1		2–1
Þróttur Reykjavík	2–2	7–2	1–1	2–1	3–1	0–6	1–3	1–0	3–1	0–3	0–4	

Updated to match(es) played on 17 September 2011. Source: ksi.is (in Icelandic)
Legend: Blue = home team win; Yellow = draw; Red = away team win.

== Statistics ==
=== Top goalscorers ===
The top scorers from the 2011 1. deild karla are as follows:

19 goals

- (Iceland) Sveinbjörn Jónasson (Þróttur R.)

16 goals

- (Iceland) Viðar Örn Kjartansson (Selfoss)

15 goals

- (Iceland) Hjörtur Hjartarson (ÍA)

11 goals

- (England) Tomi Ameobi (BÍ/Bolungarvík)

10 goals

- (Iceland) Eyþór Helgi Birgisson (HK)

9 goals

- (England) Gary Martin (ÍA)
- (United States) Daniel Howell (KA)
- (England) Mark Doninger (ÍA)
- (Senegal) (Iceland) Pape Mamadou Faye (Leiknir R.)

Last updated: September 17, 2011
