= KA-Völlur =

Sports venue in Akureyri, Iceland

(Iceland) Greifavöllurinn
- Interactive map of (Iceland) Greifavöllurinn
- Location: Akureyri, Iceland
- Coordinates: 65.6766883°N 18.1167406°W
- Capacity: 1,000

Tenant
- KA

KA-Völlur, also known as Greifavöllurinn, is a multi-use stadium complex in Akureyri, Iceland. It is currently used mostly for football matches and serves as the home stadium of KA. Its capacity is around 1,000.

KA previously played home games at Akureyrarvöllur in the town centre, but moved all home games to the team's main training complex in the Lundarhverfi neighborhood following multiple seasons where poor pitch conditions forced games to regularly be moved to Dalvík.

At present, games take place on the main training pitch, where a temporary 500-seater stand has been erected, while a larger permanent stadium with a 1000-seater stand is currently being constructed on an adjacent pitch. The new stand was first used for two games in the 2026 season against local rivals Þór, and is expected to be taken into full use in 2027.
