= Bjarni Jónsson (footballer) =

Icelandic footballer

Personal information
- Full name: Bjarni Jónsson
- Date of birth: 31 May 1965 (age 61)
- Place of birth: Iceland
- Position: Midfielder

Senior career*
Years	Team	Apps	(Gls)
1982–1990	KA	114	(15)
1991	Stjarnan	18	(0)
1992–1997	KA	93	(16)

International career
1990	Iceland	2	(0)
- * Club domestic league appearances and goals

Bjarni Jónsson (born 31 May 1965) is an Icelandic former footballer who played as a midfielder. He spent the majority of his playing career with KA, making more than 200 league appearances for the club, but also had a short spell with Stjarnan. In 1990, Bjarni won two caps for the Iceland national football team; he made his debut in the 4–0 win against Bermuda on 3 April and made his second and final appearance in the 1–4 defeat to the United States five days later.
