= Srdjan Tufegdžić =

Serbian footballer and manager

Srđan Tufegdžić
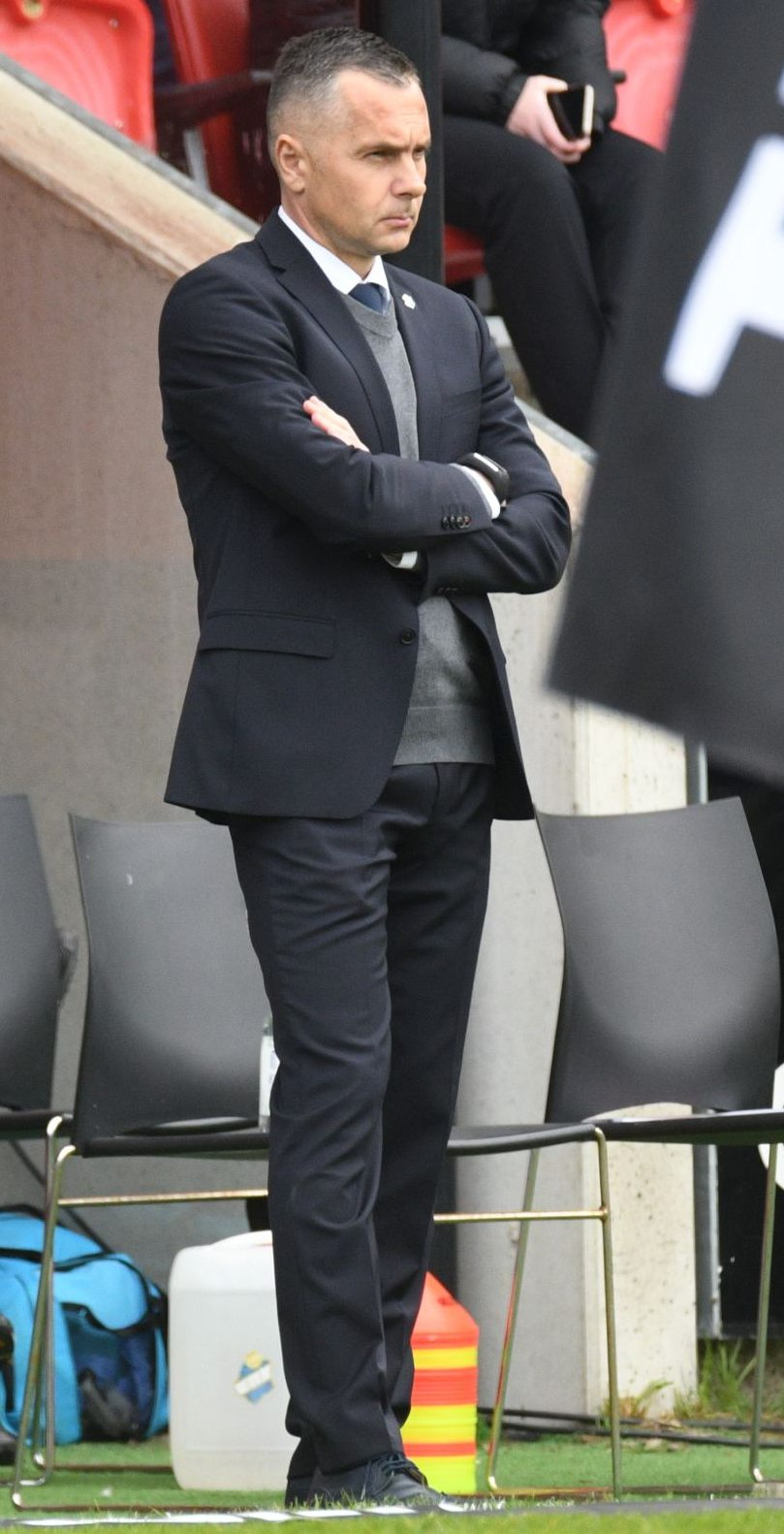

Personal information
- Date of birth: 6 April 1980 (age 46)
- Place of birth: Kruševac, Serbia
- Height: 1.83 m (6 ft 0 in)
- Position: Midfielder

Team information
- Current team: IFK Värnamo (manager)

Senior career*
Years	Team	Apps	(Gls)
1997-1999	Napredak Kruševac		
2000-2001	Novi Pazar		
2001-2002	Dinamo Pančevo		
2002-2004	Mogren	16+	(0+)
2005–2006	INON		
2006–2012	KA	92	(1)
Total		108	(1)

Managerial career
- 2012–2015: KA (assistant)
- 2015–2018: KA
- 2019: Grindavík
- 2020–2021: Valur (assistant)
- 2022–2023: Östers
- 2024: Skövde AIK
- 2024–2025: Valur
- 2026–: IFK Värnamo
- * Club domestic league appearances and goals

Srđan Tufegdžić, commonly known as Tufa, (born 6 April 1980) is a Serbian football manager and former player. He is the manager of IFK Värnamo.

== Managerial career ==
Tufegdžić took charge of Icelandic 1.deild team KA on 11 August 2015 as a caretaker manager, replacing Bjarni Jóhannsson. The club was in 5th place in the league when Tufegdžić took over, but the club managed to challenge for promotion and ended in 3rd place. After good performances under Tufegdžić, winning 5 of the team's 7 games left, he was appointed the head coach for the 2016 season.

In 2016 Tufegdžić managed KA to become 1.deild champions and securing a place in Úrvalsdeild 2017, the club won overall 16 of its 22 games. The 2017 Úrvalsdeildar season KA played their first Úrvalsdeildar game in 13 years and Tufegdžić's men ended in 7th place.

For the 2022 season, Tufegdžić was hired by Öster in the Swedish second-tier Superettan. In 2024, Tufegdžić was hired by Skövde AIK in the Swedish second-tier Superettan. Tufegdžić cited homesickness as a reason for quitting his job an moving back to his adopted home of Iceland in the summer of 2024. 1. August he took charge of Icelandic giants Valur in the Icelandic top tier Besta deild karla.

== Managerial statistics ==
As of 25 October 2025

Includes games played in Icelandic Premier League, Icelandic Cup and Icelandic League Cup.

Team	From	To	Record								
Team	From	To	M	W	D	L	GF	GA	GD	Win %	Sources
KA	11 August 2015	13 September 2018	94	48	20	26	177	110	+67	51.06	
Grindavìk	6 October 2018	28 September 2019	22	3	11	8	17	28	−11	13.64	
Öster	18 April 2022	24 november 2023	64	30	16	18	109	76	+33	46.88	
Skövde	1 December 2023	15 July 2024	17	5	3	9	10	22	−12	29.41	
Valur	1 August 2024	27 October 2025	55	29	12	14	131	84	+47	52.73	
IFK Värnamo	1 January 2026	Present	0	0	0	0	0	o	—	—	
Total			252	115	62	75	444	377	+67	45.63	

== Honours and achievements ==
=== Manager ===
Knattspyrnufélag Akureyrar

- 1. deild (1): winner 2016 Promoted to the Úrvalsdeild

=== Assistant Manager ===
Valur Reykjavík

- Icelandic Champion: 2020
