= Hreiðar Bjarnason =

Icelandic footballer

Personal information
- Date of birth: 29 May 1973 (age 53)
- Position: Defender

Senior career*
Years	Team	Apps	(Gls)
1993–1995	Þróttur		
1996–2000	Breiðablik UBK		
2001–2003	Fylkir		
2003–2004	Breiðablik UBK		

International career
2000–2001	Iceland	2	(0)
- * Club domestic league appearances and goals

Hreiðar Bjarnason (born 29 May 1973) is a retired Icelandic football defender.
