= Dejan Pešić =

Serbian footballer

Personal information
- Date of birth: December 16, 1976 (age 49)
- Place of birth: Vlasotince, SFR Yugoslavia
- Height: 1.89 m (6 ft 2 in)
- Position: Goalkeeper

Youth career
- Vlasina

Senior career*
Years	Team	Apps	(Gls)
1993–1995	Vlasina	33	(0)
1995–1997	Radnički Niš	35	(0)
1997–2002	Red Star Belgrade	6	(0)
1998–1999	→ Spartak Subotica (loan)	7	(0)
2002–2003	BSK Bujanovac	18	(0)
2004	Dubočica		
2004	Radnički Niš		
2005	Brașov	12	(0)
2005–2006	Vaslui	5	(0)
2006–2007	Sileks	4	(0)
2008–2011	Shahin Bushehr	30	(0)
2012	Vlasina		
2012–2013	Völsungur	28	(0)
- * Club domestic league appearances and goals

Dejan Pešić (Serbian Cyrillic: Дејан Пешић; born December 16, 1976) is a Serbian former football goalkeeper.

== Honours ==
Red Star Belgrade

- First League of FR Yugoslavia: 1999–00, 2000–01
- FR Yugoslavia Cup: 1999–00, 2001–02
