= 1996 1. deild karla =

Icelandic football league season

The 1996 season of 1. deild karla was the 42nd season of second-tier football in Iceland.

== League table ==
Pos	Team	Pld	W	D	L	GF	GA	GD	Pts	Promotion or relegation
1	Fram (C, P)	18	12	5	1	55	16	+39	41	Promoted to 1997 Úrvalsdeild
2	Skallagrímur (P)	18	11	4	3	34	17	+17	37	Promoted to 1997 Úrvalsdeild
3	Þróttur R.	18	10	6	2	38	21	+17	36	
4	KA	18	7	5	6	36	33	+3	26	
5	Þór A.	18	7	5	6	28	29	−1	26	
6	FH	18	7	4	7	26	22	+4	25	
7	ÍR	18	5	4	9	22	39	−17	19	
8	Víkingur R.	18	5	3	10	20	33	−13	18	
9	Völsungur (R)	18	4	3	11	25	43	−18	15	Relegated to 1997 2. deild
10	Leiknir R. (R)	18	1	3	14	17	48	−31	6	Relegated to 1997 2. deild

Rules for classification: 1) points; 2) goal difference; 3) number of goals scored.
(C) Champions; (P) Promoted; (R) Relegated

== Top scorers ==
Scorer	Goals	Team
(Iceland) Þorbjörn Atli Sveinsson	16	Fram
(Iceland) Ágúst Ólafsson	14	Fram
(Iceland) Sindri Grétarsson	14	Skallagrímur
(Iceland) Þorvaldur Makan Sigbjörnsson	12	KA
(Iceland) Hreinn Hringsson	10	Þór A.
(Iceland) Heiðar Sigurjónsson	10	Þróttur R.
