= Hallgrímur Jónasson =

Icelandic footballer (born 1986)

Personal information
- Full name: Hallgrímur Jónasson
- Date of birth: 4 May 1986 (age 40)
- Place of birth: Húsavík, Iceland
- Height: 1.84 m (6 ft 1/2 in)
- Position: Centre back

Team information
- Current team: KA
- Number: 6

Senior career*
Years	Team	Apps	(Gls)
2002	Völsungur	26	(3)
2003–2005	Þór A.	35	(3)
2006–2008	Keflavík	49	(4)
2009–2011	GAIS	47	(2)
2011	→ SønderjyskE (loan)	15	(1)
2012–2015	SønderjyskE	78	(4)
2015–2016	OB	48	(0)
2016–2017	Lyngby BK	30	(2)
2018–2023	KA	30	(1)

International career^{‡}
2004	Iceland U-19	4	(0)
2007–2008	Iceland U-21	10	(0)
2008–2017	Iceland	16	(3)
- * Club domestic league appearances and goals as of 23 May 2018 ‡ National team caps and goals as of 16 February 2017

Hallgrímur Jónasson (born 4 May 1986) is an Icelandic footballer who plays for Knattspyrnufélag Akureyrar in the Úrvalsdeild karla.

== Club career ==
Hallgrímur was born in Húsavík and his youth club is Völsungur. With them he managed to play only one season in 2nd division (2002) when he was 16 years old. He then moved to Þór Akureyri and was with them for 3 seasons in 1st division before moving with this coach from Þór to Keflavík who played in the Icelandic Premier league. With Keflavík, Hallgrímur made a name for himself and was used as a left back, central defender, central midfielder and as a right winger. He made his debut with the Icelandic national team on 16 March 2008 against Faroe Islands and played 10 games for the U21 national team and captained the team as well.

=== Völsungur ===
Played with them through their youth system and one season with the first team in 2002, then 16 years old. He played 12 matches and scored 3 goals.

=== Þór Akureyri ===
With Þór, he played for 3 seasons, 35 matches and 3 goals. At Þór his coach was Kristján Guðmundsson who moved on to manage Keflavík and took Hallgrímur with him.

=== Keflavík ===
At Keflavík, Hallgrímur played 49 matches and scored 4 goals. He mainly played as a central defender or midfielder and made a name for himself in Iceland there.

=== GAIS ===
Hallgrímur was signed to GAIS by Magnus Pehrsson who never managed him as he moved on to AaB in Denmark. Hallgrímur had an operation in November 2008 and therefore missed the whole pre-season for the 2009 season. In the end of his first season Hallgrimur secured a place in the starting line up and played 5 matches that season. In the following season, Hallgrímur was ever present in the starting line up and is now considered a key player for the team as a central defender.

== International ==
=== International goals ===
Scores and results list Iceland's goal tally first.

#	Date	Venue	Opponent	Score	Result	Competition
1	7 October 2011	Estádio do Dragão, Porto, Portugal	Portugal	1–3	3–5	UEFA Euro 2012 qualification
2	7 October 2011	Estádio do Dragão, Porto, Portugal	Portugal	2–3	3–5	UEFA Euro 2012 qualification
3	30 May 2012	Gamla Ullevi, Gothenburg, Sweden	Sweden	2–3	2–3	Friendly
