= Þorvaldur Makan Sigbjörnsson =

Icelandic footballer

Þorvaldur Makan
Personal information
- Full name: Þorvaldur Makan Sigbjörnsson
- Date of birth: 26 November 1974 (age 51)
- Place of birth: Iceland
- Position: Midfielder

Senior career*
Years	Team	Apps	(Gls)
1992–1996	KA	61	(24)
1997	Leiftur	14	(8)
1998	Östers IF	5	(1)
1999–2003	KA	69	(27)
2004	Fram	4	(2)
2006	Valur	6	(0)
2007	KA	18	(1)
2009–2010	Carl	0	(0)
Total		133	(53)

International career
1993	Iceland U18	1	(0)
2002	Iceland	1	(0)
- * Club domestic league appearances and goals

Þorvaldur Makan Sigbjörnsson (born 26 November 1974) is an Icelandic former international footballer.

== Club career ==
He played club football for KA Akureyri, Leiftur, Östers IF, KA Akureyri again, Fram Reykjavik and Valur.

In October and November 1997, Þorvaldur underwent a trial at Sheffield United and Stoke City but was not signed. In December, he had a trial with Östers IF and in January 1998, he signed a three-year contract with the club. He left Öster in November 1998, due to their financial situation following their relegation from the Allsvenskan.

In December 1998, he signed with KA.

In June 2004, Þorvaldur collapsed during the middle of a game between Fram and Fylkir due to what was initially thought to be a severe migraine. In July 2004, he announced his retirement from football due to a brain injury caused by several blows to the head over his career. Two years later, he had recovered from the injury and returned to the field with Valur.

== National team career ==
Þorvaldur won one cap for the senior Iceland team, in a 6–1 friendly defeat to Brazil in Brasília on 8 March 2002.

== Personal life ==
Þorvaldur's wife Katrín Jónsdóttir was the captain of the Iceland women's national football team. They were married in August 2009, just before Katrín played at UEFA Women's Euro 2009.
