= 1997 2. deild karla =

Icelandic football league season

The 1997 season of 2. deild karla was the 32nd season of third-tier football in Iceland.

== League table ==
Pos	Team	Pld	W	D	L	GF	GA	GD	Pts	Promotion or relegation
1	HK (C, P)	18	13	2	3	51	29	+22	41	Promoted to 1998 1. deild karla
2	KVA (P)	18	12	3	3	52	30	+22	39	Promoted to 1998 1. deild karla
3	Selfoss	18	12	3	3	45	31	+14	39	
4	Víðir	18	10	2	6	44	33	+11	32	
5	Leiknir R.	18	7	6	5	42	25	+17	27	
6	Völsungur	18	8	2	8	38	37	+1	26	
7	Ægir	18	5	4	9	38	48	−10	19	
8	Fjölnir	18	4	2	12	31	58	−27	14	
9	Þróttur N. (R)	18	4	1	13	35	51	−16	13	Relegated to 1998 3. deild karla
10	Sindri (R)	18	2	1	15	30	64	−34	7	Relegated to 1998 3. deild karla

Rules for classification: 1) points; 2) goal difference; 3) number of goals scored.
(C) Champions; (P) Promoted; (R) Relegated

== Top scorers ==
Scorer	Goals	Team
(Iceland) Sævar Þór Gíslason	19	Selfoss
(Iceland) Jón Þorgrímur Stefánsson	17	HK
(Iceland) Arngrímur Arnarson	16	Völsungur
(Iceland) Steindór Elísson	16	HK
(Iceland) Kári Jónsson	15	KVA
(Iceland) Hlynur Jóhannsson	14	Víðir
(Iceland) Sigurður Andrés Þorvarðarson	10	Selfoss
