= Akureyrarvöllur =

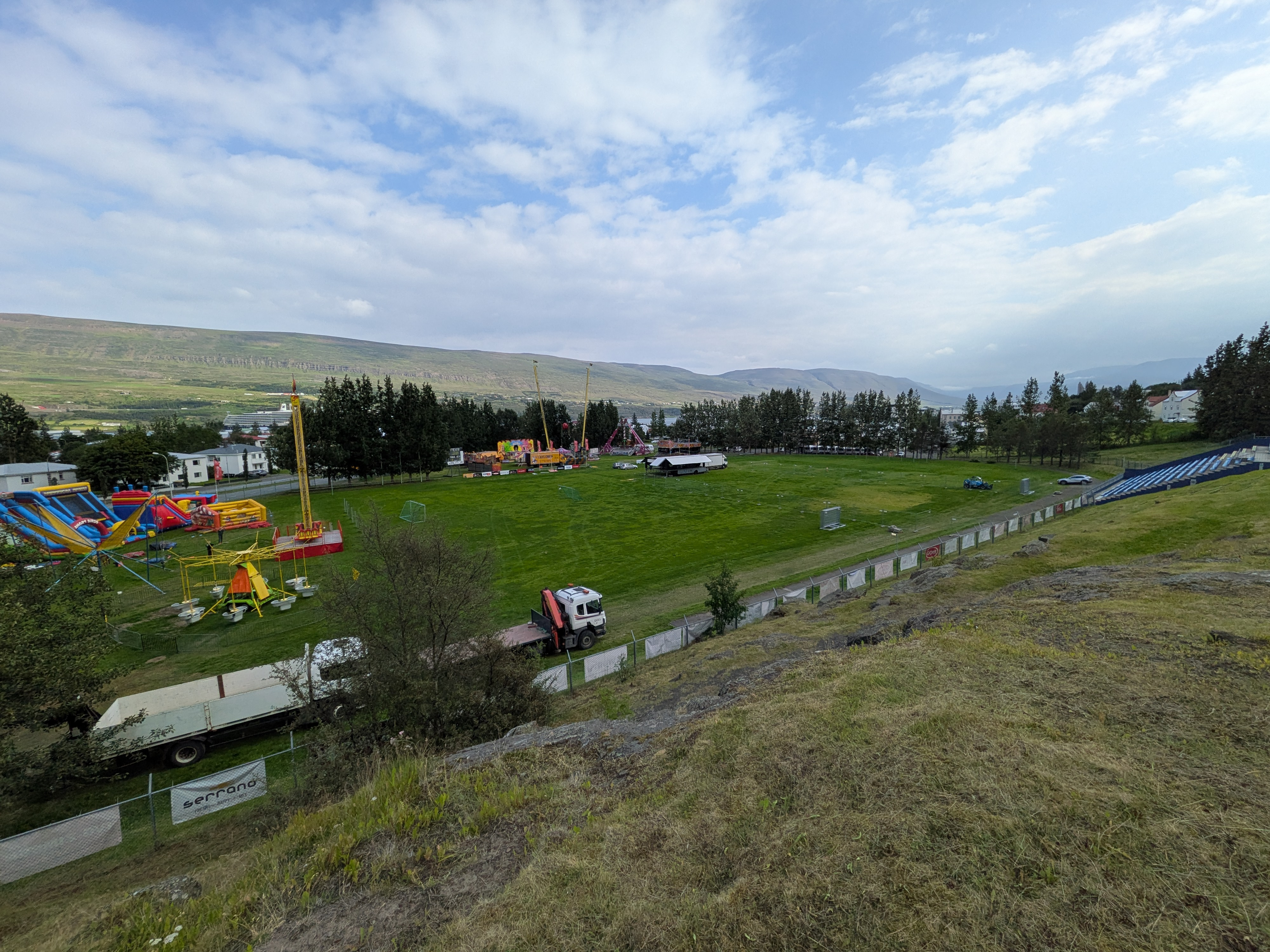
- Interactive map of Akureyrarvöllur
- Location: Glerágata; 600 Akureyri; Iceland
- Coordinates: 65°41′9.9″N 18°5′42.76″W
- Owner: Akureyri
- Capacity: 1,645

Construction
- Opened: 1953; 73 years ago

Akureyrarvöllur (Icelandic pronunciation: [ˈaːkʏrˌeiːrarˌvœtlʏr̥], regionally also [ˈaːkʰʏr-], lit. 'Akureyri Field' or more precisely 'Akureyri Stadium') is a multi-use stadium in Akureyri, Iceland. It is currently used mostly for football matches and is the former home stadium of Knattspyrnufélag Akureyrar. The stadium holds 1,645 spectators (715 seated).

After several years with the pitch in poor condition and games being frequently moved to nearby Dalvík, a decision was taken to leave the stadium and move all home games to the clubs base in the Lundarhverfi neighborhood where a new stadium is being built.
