= 2002 2. deild karla =

Icelandic football league season

The 2002 season of 2. deild karla was the 37th season of third-tier football in Iceland.

== League table ==
Pos	Team	Pld	W	D	L	GF	GA	GD	Pts	Promotion or relegation
1	HK (C, P)	18	15	2	1	47	16	+31	47	Promoted to 2003 1. deild karla
2	Njarðvík (P)	18	13	3	2	52	18	+34	42	Promoted to 2003 1. deild karla
3	KS	18	10	4	4	44	26	+18	34	
4	Völsungur	18	7	5	6	50	36	+14	26	
5	Selfoss	18	8	2	8	36	41	−5	26	
6	Víðir	18	7	3	8	23	25	−2	24	
7	Tindastóll	18	7	1	10	36	39	−3	22	
8	Léttir	18	4	4	10	26	44	−18	16	
9	Leiknir R. (R)	18	4	3	11	27	44	−17	15	Relegated to 2003 3. deild karla
10	Skallagrímur (R)	18	1	1	16	16	68	−52	4	Relegated to 2003 3. deild karla

Rules for classification: 1) points; 2) goal difference; 3) number of goals scored.
(C) Champions; (P) Promoted; (R) Relegated

== Top scorers ==
Scorer	Goals	Team
(Iceland) Ragnar Haukur Hauksson	17	KS
(Iceland) Sævar Gunnarsson	16	Njarðvík
(Iceland) Eyþór Guðnason	16	Njarðvík
(Iceland) Hörður Már Magnússon	13	HK
(Iceland) Sigurður Andrés Þorvarðarson	12	Selfoss
(Iceland) Ásmundur Arnarsson	11	Völsungur
(Iceland) Birkir Vagn Ómarsson	11	Völsungur
(Iceland) Ólafur Valdimar Júlíusson	10	HK
