= Guðmann Þórisson =

Icelandic footballer (born 1987)

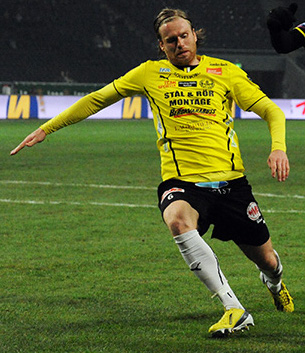

Personal information
- Full name: Guðmann Þórisson
- Date of birth: 30 January 1987 (age 39)
- Place of birth: Iceland
- Position: Centre back

Team information
- Current team: Kórdrengir

Senior career*
Years	Team	Apps	(Gls)
2005–2009	Breiðablik	59	(4)
2010–2012	Nybergsund	34	(1)
2012–2014	FH	34	(5)
2014–2015	Mjällby	11	(0)
2015–2016	FH	7	(0)
2016	→ KA (loan)	18	(2)
2017–2018	KA	18	(0)
2019–	FH	47	(0)
2022–	Kórdrengir	12	(1)

International career
2004	Iceland U-17	2	(0)
2005	Iceland U-19	6	(0)
2006–2008	Iceland U-21	7	(0)
2008	Iceland	1	(0)
- * Club domestic league appearances and goals as of 19 August 2022

Guðmann Þórisson (born 30 January 1987) is an Icelandic football player who currently plays for second level outfit Kórdrengir, after a spell at Fimleikafélag Hafnarfjarðar.

He started his career with Breiðablik, making his senior debut at the age of 18, before joining Norwegian outfit Nybergsund IL-Trysil in 2010. After two seasons in Norway, Guðmann returned to Iceland and joined FH on a two-year contract.
