= 2004 Úrvalsdeild =

Úrvalsdeild
- Season: 2004
- Dates: 15 May – 19 September 2004
- Champions: FH
- Relegated: Víkingur; KA
- Champions League: FH
- UEFA Cup: ÍBV; Keflavík
- Intertoto Cup: ÍA
- Matches played: 90
- Goals scored: 249 (2.77 per match)
- Top goalscorer: Gunnar Heiðar Þorvaldsson (12)

The 2004 season of Úrvalsdeild was the 93rd season of league football in Iceland. FH won their first title. KA and recently promoted Víkingur were relegated.

== Final league table ==
Pos	Team	Pld	W	D	L	GF	GA	GD	Pts	Qualification or relegation
1	FH (C)	18	10	7	1	33	16	+17	37	Qualification for the Champions League first qualifying round
2	ÍBV	18	9	4	5	35	20	+15	31	Qualification for the UEFA Cup first qualifying round
3	ÍA	18	8	7	3	28	19	+9	31	Qualification for the Intertoto Cup first round
4	Fylkir	18	8	5	5	26	20	+6	29	
5	Keflavík	18	7	3	8	31	33	−2	24	Qualification for the UEFA Cup first qualifying round
6	KR	18	5	7	6	21	22	−1	22	
7	Grindavík	18	5	7	6	24	31	−7	22	
8	Fram	18	4	5	9	19	28	−9	17	
9	Víkingur (R)	18	4	4	10	19	30	−11	16	Relegation to 1. deild karla
10	KA (R)	18	4	3	11	13	30	−17	15	Relegation to 1. deild karla

Source: RSSSF.com
Rules for classification: 1) points; 2) goal difference; 3) number of goals scored.
(C) Champions; (R) Relegated

== Results ==
Each team played every opponent once home and away for a total of 18 matches.

Home \ Away	FH	FRA	FYL	GRI	ÍA	ÍBV	KA	ÍBK	KR	VÍK
FH		4–1	1–0	4–1	2–2	2–1	2–2	1–1	1–1	0–0
Fram	1–2		1–1	2–1	0–2	1–2	0–1	1–6	1–0	3–0
Fylkir	1–0	1–0		1–1	2–2	1–2	0–1	2–0	3–1	2–1
Grindavík	0–4	3–2	0–2		1–1	1–1	2–0	3–2	0–0	3–3
ÍA	2–2	0–4	1–1	0–0		2–1	2–1	2–1	0–0	0–2
ÍBV	1–3	1–1	3–1	2–0	0–1		4–0	4–0	2–2	3–0
KA	1–2	0–0	0–2	1–1	0–5	0–1		1–2	3–2	0–2
Keflavík	0–1	1–1	4–2	3–4	0–2	2–5	1–0		3–1	1–0
KR	0–1	3–0	1–1	2–3	1–0	0–0	2–1	1–1		2–1
Víkingur	1–1	0–0	1–3	1–0	1–4	3–2	0–1	2–3	1–2	

Legend: Blue = home team win; Yellow = draw; Red = away team win.

== Top goalscorers ==
Rank	Player	Club	Goals
1	(Iceland) Gunnar Heiðar Þorvaldsson	ÍBV	12
2	(Iceland) Grétar Ólafur Hjartarson	Grindavík	11
3	(Iceland) Þórarinn Brynjar Kristjánsson	Keflavík	10
4	(Denmark) Allan Borgvardt	FH	8
5	(Iceland) Björgólfur Takefusa	Fylkir	7
5	(Iceland) Ríkharður Daðason	Fram	7
5	(Iceland) Arnar Gunnlaugsson	KR	7

2004 Landsbankadeild winners
FH
1st title

== Sources ==
- RSSSF.com
