= 2002 Úrvalsdeild =

Úrvalsdeild
- Season: 2002

The 2002 Úrvalsdeild was contested by 10 teams, and KR won the championship. Grindavík's Grétar Hjartarson was the top scorer with 13 goals.

== Final league table ==
Pos	Team	Pld	W	D	L	GF	GA	GD	Pts	Qualification or relegation
1	KR (C)	18	10	6	2	32	18	+14	36	Qualification for the Champions League first qualifying round
2	Fylkir	18	10	4	4	30	22	+8	34	Qualification for the UEFA Cup qualifying round
3	Grindavík	18	8	5	5	32	26	+6	29	Qualification for the UEFA Cup qualifying round
4	KA	18	6	7	5	18	19	−1	25	Qualification for the Intertoto Cup first round
5	ÍA	18	6	5	7	29	26	+3	23	
6	FH	18	5	7	6	29	30	−1	22	
7	ÍBV	18	5	5	8	23	22	+1	20	
8	Fram	18	5	5	8	29	33	−4	20	
9	Keflavík (R)	18	4	8	6	25	30	−5	20	Relegation to 1. deild karla
10	Þór (R)	18	3	4	11	22	43	−21	13	Relegation to 1. deild karla

Source: RSSSF
Rules for classification: 1) points; 2) goal difference; 3) number of goals scored.
(C) Champions; (R) Relegated

== Results ==
Each team played every opponent once home and away for a total of 18 matches.

Home \ Away	FH	FRA	FYL	GRI	ÍA	ÍBV	KA	ÍBK	KR	ÞÓR
FH		3–1	0–3	3–2	1–1	2–1	0–1	0–0	1–0	5–2
Fram	5–4		2–3	0–3	3–2	1–2	0–1	1–1	2–4	3–1
Fylkir	2–1	3–3		2–0	1–3	1–0	1–1	2–0	1–1	4–2
Grindavík	2–1	1–1	3–1		2–1	3–2	0–0	1–4	0–1	2–4
ÍA	0–0	1–1	2–0	1–3		4–1	1–1	5–2	1–2	0–1
ÍBV	2–0	0–1	0–1	0–0	4–1		1–1	1–2	3–0	3–1
KA	1–1	0–3	0–2	0–1	1–1	1–1		4–1	1–2	1–0
Keflavík	1–1	1–1	3–1	2–2	0–2	1–0	2–3		0–1	2–2
KR	2–2	1–0	1–1	2–2	3–1	1–1	2–0	2–2		5–0
Þór	4–4	2–1	0–1	1–5	0–2	1–1	0–1	1–1	0–2	

Source: RSSSF
Legend: Blue = home team win; Yellow = draw; Red = away team win.

== Top goalscorers ==
Rank	Player	Club	Goals
1	(Iceland) Grétar Hjartarson	Grindavík	13
2	(Iceland) Sævar Þór Gíslason	Fylkir	12
3	(Iceland) Sigurður Ragnar Eyjólfsson	KR	11
3	(Iceland) Gunnar Heiðar Þorvaldsson	ÍBV	11
5	(Iceland) Jóhann Þórhallsson	Þór	10
6	(Iceland) Jónas Grani Garðarsson	FH	8
7	(Iceland) Bjarki Gunnlaugsson	ÍA	7
7	(Iceland) Veigar Páll Gunnarsson	KR	7
7	(Iceland) Óli Stefán Flóventsson	Grindavík	7
7	(Iceland) Sigurvin Ólafsson	KR	7

Source: RSSSF
