= 2005 1. deild karla =

Icelandic football league season

The 2005 season of 1. deild karla was the 51st season of second-tier football in Iceland.

== League table ==
Pos	Team	Pld	W	D	L	GF	GA	GD	Pts	Promotion or relegation
1	Breiðablik (C, P)	18	13	5	0	32	13	+19	44	Promoted to 2006 Úrvalsdeild
2	Víkingur R. (P)	18	10	7	1	41	9	+32	37	Promoted to 2006 Úrvalsdeild
3	KA	18	10	4	4	40	20	+20	34	
4	Fjölnir	18	7	1	10	29	34	−5	22	
5	Víkingur Ó.	18	6	4	8	15	30	−15	22	
6	Þór A.	18	6	3	9	25	34	−9	21	
7	HK	18	4	8	6	18	21	−3	20	
8	Haukar	18	4	5	9	23	33	−10	17	
9	Völsungur (R)	18	4	4	10	17	25	−8	16	Relegated to 2006 2. deild
10	KS (R)	18	2	7	9	14	35	−21	13	Relegated to 2006 2. deild

Source: rsssf.com
Rules for classification: 1) points; 2) goal difference; 3) number of goals scored.
(C) Champions; (P) Promoted; (R) Relegated

== Top scorers ==
Scorer	Goals	Team
(Iceland) Jóhann Þórhallsson	11	KA
(Iceland) Atli Guðnason	10	Fjölnir
(Iceland) Pálmi Rafn Pálmason	10	KA
(Iceland) Tómas Leifsson	8	Fjölnir
(Iceland) Hilmar Rafn Emilsson	7	Haukar
(Iceland) Guðjón Baldvinsson	7	Stjarnan
(Iceland) Hreinn Hringsson	7	KA
(Iceland) Andri Valur Ívarsson	7	Völsungur
(Iceland) Olgeir Sigurgeirsson	6	Breiðablik
(Iceland) Pétur Georg Markan	6	Fjölnir
(Iceland) Daníel Hjaltason	6	Víkingur R.
(Iceland) Davíð Þór Rúnarsson	6	Víkingur R.
(Iceland) Jón Guðbrandsson	6	Víkingur R.
