= Grétar Hjartarson =

Icelandic footballer

Personal information
- Full name: Grétar Ólafur Hjartarson
- Date of birth: 26 November 1977 (age 48)
- Place of birth: Sandgerði, Iceland
- Height: 1.83 m (6 ft 0 in)
- Position: Striker

Senior career*
Years	Team	Apps	(Gls)
1995–1996	Reynir S.	17	(13)
1996–1998	Stirling Albion	17	(5)
1997	Reynir S. (loan)	8	(2)
1998–1999	Grindavík	26	(15)
2000–2001	Lillestrøm S.K.	9	(0)
2000	Landskrona BoIS (loan)	4	(1)
2001–2004	Grindavík	54	(33)
2005–2008	KR	53	(12)
2008–2010	Grindavík	23	(5)
2011	Keflavík	7	(1)
2012	Reynir S.	21	(11)
2014	Reynir S.	6	(0)

International career^{‡}
1999	Iceland U-21	2	(2)
2002	Iceland	1	(0)
- * Club domestic league appearances and goals as of 17 December 2012 ‡ National team caps and goals as of 22 January 2008

Grétar Ólafur Hjartarson (born 26 November 1977 in Sandgerði, Iceland) is an Icelandic former football player who last played for Reynir S.
