= 1997 1. deild karla =

Icelandic football league season

The 1997 season of 1. deild karla was the 43rd season of second-tier football in Iceland.

== League table ==
Pos	Team	Pld	W	D	L	GF	GA	GD	Pts	Promotion or relegation
1	Þróttur R. (C, P)	18	12	4	2	40	21	+19	40	Promoted to 1998 Úrvalsdeild
2	ÍR (P)	18	12	3	3	50	25	+25	39	Promoted to 1998 Úrvalsdeild
3	FH	18	12	3	3	40	17	+23	39	
4	Breiðablik	18	12	3	3	37	14	+23	39	
5	Þór A.	18	6	4	8	22	34	−12	22	
6	Fylkir	18	5	5	8	24	26	−2	20	
7	KA	18	4	6	8	24	31	−7	18	
8	Víkingur R.	18	4	4	10	21	31	−10	16	
9	Dalvík (R)	18	3	3	12	22	41	−19	12	Relegated to 1998 2. deild
10	Reynir S. (R)	18	1	3	14	12	52	−40	6	Relegated to 1998 2. deild

Rules for classification: 1) points; 2) goal difference; 3) number of goals scored.
(C) Champions; (P) Promoted; (R) Relegated

== Top scorers ==
Scorer	Goals	Team
(Iceland) Kristján Carnell Brooks	19	ÍR
(Iceland) Kjartan Einarsson	16	Breiðablik
(Iceland) Brynjar Þór Gestsson	10	FH
(Iceland) Einar Örn Birgisson	10	Þróttur R.
(Iceland) Guðjón Þorvarðarson	8	ÍR
