= Knattspyrnufélag Akureyrar =

Icelandic sports club

KA
- Full name: Knattspyrnufélag Akureyrar
- Short name: KA
- Founded: 1928; 98 years ago
- Ground: KA-Völlur, Akureyri
- Chairman: Hjörvar Maronsson
- Manager: Eiður Guðjohnsen
- League: 1. deild karla
- 2026: Besta deild karla, 11th of 12 (relegated)
- Website: www.ka.is
Home colours	Away colours

Knattspyrnufélag Akureyrar (Icelandic pronunciation: [ˈkʰnahtˌspɪ(r)tnʏˌfjɛːˌlaːɣ ˈaːkʏrˌeiːrar̥], lit. 'Akureyri Football Club'), commonly abbreviated to KA, is an Icelandic multi-sport club based in Akureyri in the north of Iceland. The club was founded in 1928. The football team currently plays in the 1.deild karla, the second tier of Icelandic football, following relegation from the Besta deild karla at the end of the 2026 season. KA has won the top flight once in 1989, and the Icelandic Cup in 2024.

== Club ==
The club offers various sports including football, handball, judo, volleyball and weightlifting.

The club crest features a red shield overlaid on a blue shield. Within the red shield is a golden ball, with the letters 'KA' positioned above it in white. The team colours are yellow shirts and blue shorts.

Its main rival is another sports club in Akureyri, Þór Akureyri. Support for the two clubs is traditionally split along the Glerá river, with KA supporters mostly originating south of the river.

== History ==
=== The early years (1928–1943) ===
KA was founded on January 8, 1928, in the home of Margrét and Axel Schiöth, at Hafnarstræti 23, with the goal of promoting sports in Akureyri.

=== ÍBA (1943–1974) ===
Between 1944 and 1974 the two most prominent football clubs in Akureyri, KA and Þór, sent a united team under the banner of ÍBA to the Icelandic first tier made up of a selection of players from the Akureyri clubs. The club played 17 seasons in the top flight of Icelandic football league, Úrvalsdeild karla.

The first time the two Akureyri clubs, KA and Þór, combined forces was against recent league champions Valur in the middle of July 1942. The teams played twice, the united team from Akureyri won one game but lost the other. The positive results gave impetus to unification ideas and in 1943 for the fourth time a team from Akureyri played in Úrvalsdeild karla. But now it sailed under the flag of Íþróttaráð Akureyrar (In english Akureyri Sports Council) and not KA as in all the previous times.

The subsequent year, in 1944, saw the establishment of ÍB Akureyri. By 1946, a football team representing ÍBA competed in Úrvalsdeild karla, for the first time.

From 1955 to 1974, the ÍBA team always took part in the Icelandic men's football tournament. In 1974, the two respective sports clubs ended their collaboration and started sending teams separately as KA and Þór.

=== Becoming Icelandic Champions (1988–1992) ===
KA won the Icelandic Men’s Football Championship for the first time in the club’s history in 1989, completing one of the most notable title runs in Icelandic football. The achievement challenged the long-standing dominance of Reykjavík-based clubs and is widely regarded as a landmark moment for football in northern Iceland.

Coached by Guðjón Þórðarson, KA were often characterised as a physically strong and highly competitive side rather than a technically elaborate one. While this approach occasionally led to dropped points against lower-ranked teams, KA proved highly effective against title rivals, with decisive results against Fram, Valur, and KR forming the backbone of their championship campaign. The team finished the season unbeaten in their final 11 league matches. After a mixed start to the season, KA gathered momentum with a series of key victories, including dominant home and away wins over established contenders. A crucial turning point came late in the season, when KA moved to the top of the league table for the first time following a 5–1 away victory against Víkingur Reykjavík.

In the penultimate round, KA dropped points in a draw against Valur in a crucial match. With only one round remaining, FH led the league with 32 points, while KA were close behind on 31. FH were widely expected to clinch the title, as they were scheduled to face already relegated Fylkir at home. However, KA secured a 2–0 away win against ÍBK in the final round, while FH suffered a surprise home defeat to Fylkir. The combined results confirmed KA as Icelandic champions, sealing their first league title.

As FH had been expected to secure the championship, the trophy was not immediately available and had to be driven from Hafnarfjörður to Keflavík. Nevertheless, celebrations were extensive. An estimated 1,000 supporters welcomed the team home at Akureyri Airport, followed by official receptions and public festivities.

Forward Þorvaldur Örlygsson was named Iceland’s Player of the Season. His performances during the 1989 campaign were widely recognised as instrumental in KA’s historic triumph and after the season he transferred to Nottingham Forest.

=== Back to the top tier (2015– ) ===
The summer of 2015 was filled with anticipation for KA. Despite losing some key players, the team demonstrated strength during preseason, reaching the final of the Icelandic Men's Football League Cup but ultimately losing to Breiðablik. Good signings, preseason success, and the experienced coach Bjarni Jóhannsson, who took over in 2013, led many pundits to predict that KA would be promoted to the top flight with ease. However, the season failed to meet expectations, and the team finished in 3rd place, prompting the sacking of manager Jóhannsson, with his assistant Srdjan Tufegdzic taking over late in the season.

In 2016, KA finally reached the top flight. Under new management with Tufegdzic at the helm and notable acquisitions like Hallgrímur Mar Steingrímsson, Guðmann Þórisson, and Ásgeir Sigurgeirsson, the team comfortably won the second division. Expectations were high for KA's first match in the top division in thirteen years. The team faced Breiðablik and emerged victorious with a 1–3 scoreline. The first season in the top division since 2004 fared well as the team finished in 7th place.

The following year saw KA once again finish in 7th place, and at the end of the season, the club parted ways with Tufegdzic. Óli Stefán Flóventsson replaced him and managed to guide the team to 5th place, KA's best showing since 2002. Elfar Árni Aðalsteinsson emerged as the team's top scorer with 13 goals. However, the subsequent season did not go as well for Flóventsson, who was let go after managing five games without a win. His replacement, Arnar Grétarsson, led the team to a 7th-place finish, although the season was cut short due to COVID-19. The season was notable for an unusual number of draws, with the team drawing 12 times. The team was praised for its solid defending and the homegrown player Brynjar Ingi Bjarnason had a breakout season.

The 2021 season marked Grétarsson's first full season as head coach, during which significant acquisitions like Jonathan Hendrickx, Dušan Brković, and the return of homegrown player Daníel Hafsteinsson bolstered the team's roster. On 29 May 2021, Bjarnason made his international debut for the Icelandic national team before being sold to Lecce midway through the season. Despite the loss of Bjarnason, KA achieved remarkable success, securing its best result since 2002 with a 4th-place finish. Moving into the 2022 season, KA continued its upward trajectory, clinching its second-best result ever in the Besta deild karla. This achievement qualified them for the UEFA Europa Conference League. Nökkvi Þeyr Þórisson showcased an outstanding performance throughout the season, earning recognition as the league's best player and top scorer with 17 goals. Notably, his remarkable achievements came despite his transfer to K Beerschot VA before the season concluded. Grétarsson's assistant and former KA player, Hallgrímur Jónasson, assumed managerial duties for the team towards the end of the season, following the departure of Grétarsson. Jónasson successfully navigated the team through the playoffs and a second-place finish.

In 2023, KA finished 7th in the league and made it to the cup final against Víkingur R., ultimately losing 3-1. As a result, the team qualified for the UEFA Europa Conference League and in 2024 they had a relatively successful campaign, defeating Connah's Quay Nomads and Dundalk, with their journey coming to an end against Club Brugge.

In 2024, KA would repeat their successful cup run from last year once again facing Víkingur R. in the final. On their way to the final, KA defeated ÍR, Vestri, Fram, and Valur. The final was played at a high tempo, with both teams adopting an attacking approach in the first half. KA proved more incisive going forward and took the lead in the 37th minute following a corner kick, when Viðar Örn Kjartansson forced the ball over the line during a crowded goalmouth situation. In the second half, Víkingur increased their attacking pressure, but KA maintained their intensity and defensive discipline, limiting clear scoring opportunities. Deep into stoppage time, substitute Dagur Ingi Valsson sealed the win for KA. The match ended 2–0, securing KA’s first Icelandic Cup title. KA's victory also meant that they had qualified for the UEFA Conference League, a second time in a row.

== Football ==
=== Men's football ===
KA formerly played at Akureyrarvöllur close to downtown Akureyri but have since moved all games to Greifavöllurinn, a temporary arena at the club's training base, KA-Heimilið in the Lundarhverfi neighborhood where a new permanent stadium is also being built.

==== Current squad ====
As of 15 August 2026

Note: Flags indicate national team as defined under FIFA eligibility rules; some limited exceptions apply. Players may hold more than one non-FIFA nationality.

No.	Pos.	Nation	Player
1	GK	ISL	Ívar Arnbro Þórhallsson
2	DF	ISL	Birgir Baldvinsson
3	DF	ISL	Kári Gautason
4	MF	ESP	Rodri
6	MF	DEN	André Rømer
7	FW	ISL	Adam Pálsson
8	MF	DEN	Jeppe Pedersen
10	FW	ISL	Hallgrímur Mar Steingrímsson
11	FW	ISL	Ásgeir Sigurgeirsson (captain)
13	GK	ISL	Steinþór Már Auðunsson
14	MF	ISL	Danijel Djuric
15	FW	ISL	Oliver Heidarsson
16	FW	ISL	Jakob Hédinn Róbertsson
17	DF	SWE	Samuel Kroon

No.	Pos.	Nation	Player
20	MF	SWE	Diego Montiel
21	MF	ISL	Mikael Breki Þórðarson
23	DF	ISL	Markús Máni Pétursson
25	MF	ISL	Bjarki Fannar Helgason
27	MF	ISL	Árni Veigar Árnason
28	DF	ISL	Hans Viktor Guðmundsson
29	FW	ISL	Jakob Snær Árnason
30	DF	ISL	Guðjón Ernir Hrafnkelsson
44	MF	ISL	Valdimar Sævarsson
75	MF	ISL	Ívar Logi Jóhannsson
91	MF	ISL	Snorri Kristinsson
99	GK	ISL	Jóhann Mikael Ingólfsson
-	FW	FRO	Jóan Símun Edmundsson

==== Out on loan ====
Note: Flags indicate national team as defined under FIFA eligibility rules; some limited exceptions apply. Players may hold more than one non-FIFA nationality.

No.	Pos.	Nation	Player
18	DF	ISL	Hákon Atli Aðalsteinsson (at Dalvík/Reynir until 31 January 2027)
19	DF	ISL	Breki Hólm Baldursson (at HK until 31 January 2027)

No.	Pos.	Nation	Player
—	FW	ISL	Agnar Óli Grétarsson (at KF until 31 January 2027)
—	FW	ISL	Þórhallur Ási Aðalsteinsson (at Huginn until 31 January 2027)

==== European record ====
Competition	Matches	W	D	L	GF	GA
UEFA European Cup	2	1	0	1	1	3
UEFA Cup Winners Cup	2	0	0	2	1	14
UEFA Intertoto Cup	2	0	2	0	2	2
UEFA Europa Conference League	8	3	2	3	16	17
Total	14	4	4	6	18	36

===== Matches =====
Season	Competition	Round	Opponents	1st leg	2nd leg	Aggregate
1970–1971	UEFA Cup Winners' Cup	1R	(Switzerland) Zürich	1–7	0–7	1–14
1990–1991	UEFA European Cup	1R	(Bulgaria) CSKA Sofia	1–0	0–3	1–3
2003	UEFA Intertoto Cup	1R	(Bosnia and Herzegovina) Sloboda Tuzla	1–1	1–1 (a.e.t.)	2–2 (2–3 p)
2023–24	UEFA Europa Conference League	1Q	(Wales) Connah's Quay Nomads	2–0	2–0	4–0
2023–24	UEFA Europa Conference League	2Q	(Republic of Ireland) Dundalk	3–1	2–2	5–3
2023–24	UEFA Europa Conference League	3Q	(Belgium) Club Brugge	1–5	1–5	2–10
2025–26	UEFA Conference League	2Q	(Denmark) Silkeborg	1–1	2–3 (a.e.t.)	3–4 (a.e.t.)

Notes

- PR: Preliminary Round
- 1R: First round
- 1Q: First qualifying round
- 2Q: Second qualifying round
- 3Q: Third qualifying round
- PO: Play-off round

==== Recent history ====
Season		Pos.	Pl.	W	D	L	GS	GA	P	Cup	Notes
1987	Úrvalsdeild	6	18	5	6	7	18	17	21	Fourth round	
1988	Úrvalsdeild	4	18	8	3	7	31	29	27	Fourth round	
1989	Úrvalsdeild	1	18	9	7	2	29	15	34	Fourth round	
1990	Úrvalsdeild	8	18	5	1	12	18	28	16	Fourth round	European Cup
1991	Úrvalsdeild	6	18	7	4	7	21	23	25	Fourth round	
1992	Úrvalsdeild	↓10	18	3	4	11	18	33	13	Final	Relegated to the 1.deild
1993	1.deild	4	18	9	2	7	31	22	29	Fourth round	
1994	1.deild	8	18	5	3	10	26	34	18	Third round	
1995	1.deild	3	18	7	6	5	26	25	27	Second round	
1996	1.deild	4	18	7	5	6	36	33	26	Quarter-finals	
1997	1.deild	7	18	4	6	8	24	31	18	Fourth round	
1998	1.deild	7	18	7	4	7	24	28	25	Third round	
1999	1.deild	6	18	6	5	7	24	24	23	Second round	
2000	1.deild	3	18	10	4	4	38	23	34	Fourth round	
2001	1.deild	↑ 2	18	11	4	3	43	21	37	Final	Promoted to the Úrvalsdeild
2002	Úrvalsdeild	4	18	6	7	5	18	19	25	Semi-finals	
2003	Úrvalsdeild	8	18	6	4	8	29	27	22	Semi-finals	UEFA Intertoto Cup
2004	Úrvalsdeild	↓ 10	18	4	3	11	13	30	15	Final	Relegated to the 1.deild
2005	1. deild	3	18	10	4	4	40	20	34	Fourth round	
2006	1. deild	6	18	6	3	9	22	25	21	Quarter-finals	
2007	1. deild	11	22	5	4	13	14	45	19	Third round	
2008	1. deild	4	22	9	5	8	31	27	32	Third round	
2009	1. deild	5	22	10	5	7	32	24	35	Fourth round	
2010	1. deild	9	22	6	6	10	29	43	24	Quarter-finals	
2011	1. deild	8	22	9	2	11	32	40	29	Third round	
2012	1. deild	4	22	9	6	7	34	30	33	Fourth round	
2013	1. deild	6	22	9	5	8	38	31	32	Second round	
2014	1. deild	8	22	8	7	7	42	33	31	Third round	
2015	1. deild	3	22	12	5	5	42	22	41	Semi-final	
2016	1. deild	↑ 1	22	16	3	3	42	16	51	Third round	Promoted to the Úrvalsdeild
2017	Úrvalsdeild	7	22	7	8	7	37	31	29	Third round	
2018	Úrvalsdeild	7	22	7	7	8	36	34	28	Fourth round	
2019	Úrvalsdeild	5	22	9	4	9	34	34	31	Fourth round	
2020	Úrvalsdeild	7	18	3	12	3	20	21	21	Fourth round	*Season not completed due to COVID-19
2021	Úrvalsdeild	4	22	12	4	6	36	20	40	Fourth round	
2022	Besta deild	2	27	16	5	6	54	30	53	Semi-final	
2023	Besta deild	7	27	12	5	10	42	45	41	Final	UEFA Europa Conference League
2024	Besta deild	7	27	10	7	10	44	48	37	Winner	UEFA Europa Conference League
2025	Besta deild	7	27	11	6	10	45	49	39	Fourth round	

==== Trophies and achievements ====
- Icelandic Champion:
  - Winners: 1989
- Icelandic Cup:
  - Winners: 2024
- Icelandic League Cup:
  - Runners-up: 2015
- Icelandic Super Cup:
  - Champions: 1990

==== Notable former players ====
- (Iceland) Þorvaldur Örlygsson
- (Iceland) Erlingur Kristjánsson
- (Iceland) Þorvaldur Makan Sigbjörnsson
- (Iceland) Hreinn Hringsson
- (England) Dean Martin
- (Hungary) Sandor Matus
- (Iceland) Pálmi Rafn Pálmason
- (Iceland) Atli Sveinn Þórarinsson
- (Iceland) Haukur Heiðar Hauksson
- (Iceland) Brynjar Ingi Bjarnason
- (Iceland) Nökkvi Þeyr Þórisson

==== Player of the Season ====
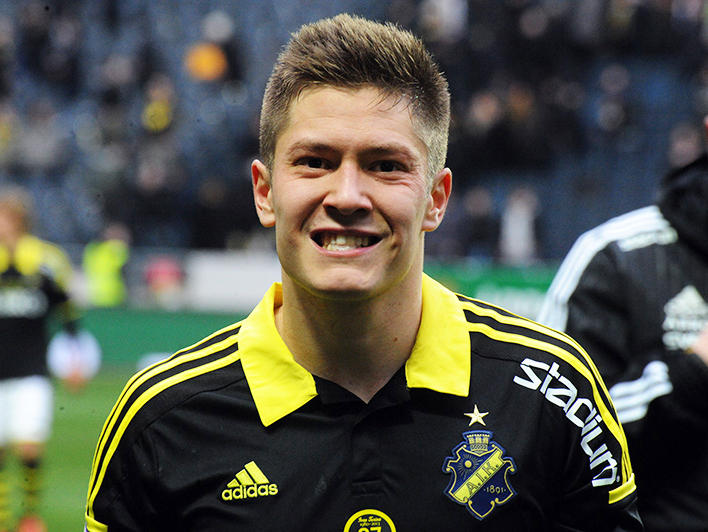
Haukur Heiðar Hauksson, two-time winner of the award

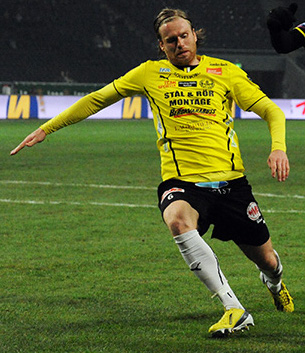
Guðmann Þórisson, won the award in 2016

Season	Name	Nationality	Position	Ref.
2004	Sandor Matus	Hungary	Goalkeeper	
2005	Pálmi Rafn Pálmason	Iceland	Midfielder	
2006	Janez Vrenko	Slovenia	Defender	
2007	Þorvaldur Sveinn Guðbjörnsson	Iceland	Defender	
2008	Arnar Már Guðjónsson	Iceland	Midfielder	
2009	Haukur Heiðar Hauksson	Iceland	Defender	
2010	Sandor Matus (2)	Hungary	Goalkeeper	
2011	Haukur Heiðar Hauksson (2)	Iceland	Defender	
2012	Gunnar Valur Gunnarsson	Iceland	Defender	
2013	Hallgrímur Mar Steingrímsson	Iceland	Midfielder	
2014	Srdjan Rajkovic	Serbia	Goalkeeper	
2015	Callum Williams	England	Defender	
2016	Guðmann Þórisson	Iceland	Defender	
2017	Hallgrímur Mar Steingrímsson (2)	Iceland	Midfielder	
2018	Callum Williams (2)	England	Defender	
2019	Elfar Árni Aðalsteinsson	Iceland	Forward	
2020	Brynjar Ingi Bjarnason	Iceland	Defender	
2021	Steinþór Már Auðunsson	Iceland	Goalkeeper	
2022	Ívar Örn Árnason	Iceland	Defender	
2023	Hallgrímur Mar Steingrímsson (3)	Iceland	Midfielder	
2024	Hans Viktor Guðmundsson	Iceland	Defender	
2025	Hallgrímur Mar Steingrímsson (4)	Iceland	Midfielder	

==== Overall most appearances ====
Rank	Nationality	Name	Years	Appearances
1	(Iceland)	Hallgrímur M. Steingrímsson	2009–14, 2016–	320
2	(Hungary)	Sandor Matus	2004–13	231
3	(England)	Dean Martin	1995–97, 1999–04, 2008–10	214
4	(Iceland)	Hrannar Björn Steingrímsson	2014–	205
5	(Iceland)	Elfar Árni Aðalsteinsson	2015–	198
6	(Iceland)	Ásgeir Sigurgeirsson	2016–	173
7	(Iceland)	Steingrímur Örn Eiðsson	1997–07	168
8	(Iceland)	Andri Fannar Stefánsson	2010, 2019–	166
9	(Iceland)	Bjarni Jónsson	1987–97	166
10	(Iceland)	Þorvaldur M. Sigbjörnsson	1992–96, 1999–03, 2007	160

==== Overall top scorers ====
Rank	Nationality	Name	Years	Goals
1	(Iceland)	Hallgrímur M. Steingrímsson	2009–14, 2016–	98
2	(Iceland)	Hreinn Hringsson	2000–06	73
3	(Iceland)	Elfar Árni Aðalsteinsson	2015–	71
3	(Iceland)	Þorvaldur M. Sigbjörnsson	1992–96, 1999–03, 2007	61
5	(Iceland)	Ásgeir Sigurgeirsson	2016–	42
6	(Hungary)	David Disztl	2009–2010, 2012	32
7	(Iceland)	Nökkvi Þeyr Þórisson	2019–2022	30
8	(Iceland)	Ævar Ingi Jóhannesson	2011–15	28
9	(Iceland)	Þorvaldur Örlygsson	1984–89, 2000–03	25
10	(Iceland)	Jóhann Helgason	2002–05, 2012, 2014–15	24

==== Managerial history ====
- (Iceland) Einar Helgason (1975–76)
- (Iceland) Jóhannes Atlason (1977–79)
- (Scotland) Alex Willoughby (1980–82)
- (Germany) Fritz Kissing (1983)
- (Iceland) Gústaf Baldvinsson (1984–1986)
- (Iceland) Hörður Helgason (1987)
- (Iceland) Guðjón Þórðarson (1988–1990)
- (Iceland) Ormar Örlygsson (1991)
- (Iceland) Gunnar Gíslason (1992)
- (Iceland) Njáll Eiðsson (1993)
- (Iceland) Erlingur Kristjánsson (1994)
- (Iceland) Pétur Ormslev (1995–1996)
- (Iceland) Sigurður Kristján Lárusson (1997)
- (Iceland) Einar Einarsson (1998–1999)
- (Iceland) Þorvaldur Örlygsson (2000–2005)
- (Serbia) Slobodan Milisic (2006–2007)
- (Iceland) Pétur Ólafsson (2007)
- (England) Dean Martin (2008–2010)
- (Iceland) Gunnlaugur Jónsson (2011–2012)
- (Iceland) Bjarni Jóhannsson (2013–2015)
- (Serbia) Srdjan Tufegdzic (2015–2018)
- (Iceland) Óli Stefán Flóventsson (2019–2020)
- (Iceland) Arnar Grétarsson (2020–2022)
- (Iceland) Hallgrímur Jónasson (2022–present)

==== Kit ====
Period	Kit manufacturer
1975–78	Adidas
1979	Hummel
1980–1981	Puma
1982–83	Hummel
1984–98	Adidas
1999–2002	Puma
2003	Henson
2004–2014	Hummel
2015–2019	Diadora
2020–2023	Erreà
2023–	Macron

=== Women's Football ===
Since 1999, KA has fielded a joint women's team with neighbouring club Þór Akureyri under the name Þór/KA in the top-level league Úrvalsdeild. In 2006 the team finished 7th of 8 teams, 8th/9 in 2007, the reaching a good 4th/10 in 2008 and then bettering those results with 3rd/10 in 2009 and a second-place finish in 2010. As Iceland was in the top 8 leagues of UEFA, those second place was enough to qualify for the 2011–12 UEFA Women's Champions League. The team entered in the round of 32 but lost 14–2 on aggregate to German team Turbine Potsdam.

In 2010 the team also went to the semi-finals in the Icelandic cup, losing to the eventual winner Valur. In 1989 and 2013 they lost the cup final.

In 2012 Þór/KA finished first in the Úrvalsdeild and secured its first ever Icelandic championship.

On 29 September 2017, the club secured its second national championship by defeating FH, in the last game of the season, 2–0 with goals from Sandra Jessen and Sandra Stephany Mayor.

==== Trophies and achievements ====
- Úrvalsdeild kvenna (2):
  - 2012^{1}, 2017^{1}
- Icelandic Women's Football Cup:
  - Runner-up: 2013^{1}
- Icelandic Division I (2):
  - 1992^{2}, 1999^{1}
1. As Þór/KA
2. As KA

== Handball ==
=== Men's handball ===
Before the 2006–2007 Icelandic handball season, they merged their handball clubs to form Akureyri Handboltafélag. In 2017, KA left the partnership and reinstated the KA Handball section.

==== Trophies and achievements ====
- Icelandic Championships:
  - (gold) Gold medal: 1997, 2002
- Icelandic Cup:
  - Champions: 1995, 1996, 2004
- Icelandic League Cup:
  - Champions: 1996, 1998, 2001

=== Women's handball ===
==== Trophies and achievements ====
- Icelandic championship:
  - (gold) Gold medal:2021
- Icelandic Cup
  - (gold) Gold medal:2021
- Icelandic Super Cup:
  - (gold) Gold medal:2020
- 1. deild kvenna:
  - (gold) Gold medal: 2018

== Volleyball ==
=== Trophies and achievements ===
==== Men's volleyball ====
- Icelandic Championships:
  - (gold) Gold medal: 1989, 1991, 2010, 2011, 2018, 2019
- Icelandic Cup:
  - Champions: 1991, 1992, 2010, 2011, 2012, 2015, 2016, 2018, 2019
- Icelandic League Cup:
  - Champions: 1989, 1991, 1994, 2010, 2011, 2018, 2019

==== Women's volleyball ====
- Icelandic Championships:
  - (gold) Gold medal: 2019
- Icelandic Cup:
  - Champions: 2019
- Icelandic League Cup:
  - Champions: 2019

== Club officials ==
As of 29 February 2024

=== Current technical body ===
Position	Name	Nationality
Sports director	Sævar Pétursson	(Iceland)
Head coach	Hallgrímur Jónasson	(Iceland)
Assistant coach	Elmar Dan Sigþórsson	(Iceland)
Assistant coach	Steingrímur Örn Eiðsson	(Iceland)
Goalkeeper coach	Michael Charpentier Kjeldsen	(Denmark)
Physiotherapist	Halldór Hermann Jónsson	(Iceland)
Fitness coach	Egill Ármann Kristinsson	(Iceland)
Head of Youth Development	Aðalbjörn Hannesson	(Iceland)
U-21 Coach	Egill Daði Angantýsson	(Iceland)
Kitman	Petar Ivanic	(Serbia)

=== Club Board ===
Position	Name	Nationality
Club Chairman	Eiríkur S. Jóhannsson	(Iceland)
Vice-chairman	Vignir Már Þormóðsson	(Iceland)
Treasurer	Sigríður Jóhannsdóttir	(Iceland)
Board Member	Hjalti Þór Hreinsson	(Iceland)
Board Member	Linda Ívarsdóttir	(Iceland)
Football Chairman	Hjörvar Maronsson	(Iceland)
Handball Chairman	Haddur Júlíus Stefánsson	(Iceland)
Volleyball Chairman	Arnar Már Sigurðsson	(Iceland)
Judo Chairman	Sigmundur Magnússon	(Iceland)
Weightlifting Chairman	Birkir Örn Jónsson	(Iceland)

=== Football Board ===
Position	Name	Nationality
Chairman	Hjörvar Maronsson	(Iceland)
Board Member	Gunnlaugur Eiðsson	(Iceland)
Board Member	Róbert Már Kristinsson	(Iceland)
Board Member	Jóhann Rúnar Sigurðsson	(Iceland)
Board Member	Elmar Dan Sigþórsson	(Iceland)
Board Member	Katrín Vilhjálmsdóttir	(Iceland)
Board Member	Sigurður Skúli Eyjólfsson	(Iceland)
