= Gunnar Einarsson =

Icelandic footballer and manager

Personal information
- Full name: Gunnar Einarsson
- Date of birth: 7 July 1976 (age 50)
- Place of birth: Reykjavík, Iceland
- Height: 1.81 m (5 ft 11 in)
- Positions: Defender; midfielder

Senior career*
Years	Team	Apps	(Gls)
1995–1997	Valur	24	(0)
1997–2000	Roda JC	0	(0)
1997	→ MVV	10	(0)
1997–1998	→ MVV	13	(0)
1998	→ MVV	0	(0)
1999	→ VVV	7	(0)
2000	→ Brentford	2	(0)
2000–2007	KR	96	(1)
2007–2009	Valur	13	(1)
2009–2011	Leiknir Reykjavík	44	(2)
2011	Víkingur	10	(0)
2011–2012	Leiknir Reykjavík	21	(2)

International career
1996–1997	Iceland U21	6	(0)
1998	Iceland	1	(0)

Managerial career
- 2011: Leiknir Reykjavík (joint-caretaker)
- 2012: Leiknir Reykjavík (caretaker)
- 2020: Kári
- 2020–2021: Víkingur Ólafsvík
- 2024–: KR Women (joint-manager)
- * Club domestic league appearances and goals

Gunnar Einarsson (born 7 July 1976) is a retired Icelandic footballer who played as a defender.

Gunnar is probably best remembered for his time as a player with KR and Valur, with whom he won four Úrvalsdeild titles between 2000 and 2007. He was capped by Iceland at international level.

== Club career ==
=== Valur ===
Adept anywhere in defence or as a defensive midfielder, Gunnar began his career at Úrvalsdeild side Valur, alongside fellow young players Eiður Guðjohnsen and Ívar Ingimarsson. He made his debut during the 1995 season, making nine appearances. He played in 15 of Valur's 18 league games during the 1996 season and departed the club in January 1997.

=== Roda JC ===
Gunnar moved to the Netherlands in January 1997 to sign for Eredivisie side Roda JC. He failed to make an appearance for the club and spent most of his contract away on loan. Gunnar was loaned to MVV on three separate occasions between 1997 and 1998. He was a part of the team that finished the 1996–97 season as Eerste Divisie champions and made 24 appearances across his three spells with the club. Gunnar made seven appearances for Eerste Divisie club VVV on loan during the final months of the 1998–99 season. Gunnar made three appearances for English Second Division club Brentford during a three-month loan in the middle of the 1999–2000 season.

=== Return to Iceland ===
Gunnar returned to Iceland to sign for reigning Úrvalsdeild champions KR in April 2000. He won three Úrvalsdeild championships, two League Cups and the 2003 Icelandic Super Cup prior to moving across Reykjavík to return to Valur in January 2007. Gunnar won the 2007 Úrvalsdeild title and then the League Cup and the Icelandic Super Cup during the following season. He made 40 appearances and scored one goal during two seasons with the club.

Gunnar dropped down to the 1. deild karla to sign for Leiknir Reykjavík in a player/assistant manager role May 2009. He made 59 appearances and scored two goals before moving back up to the Úrvalsdeild to sign a contract with Víkingur in July 2011. He made 10 league appearances in what remained of the 2011 season and suffered relegation straight back to the 1. deild karla. Gunnar returned to Leiknir Reykjavík in November 2011, again in a player/assistant manager role. He made 31 appearances and scored three goals during the 2012 season, which was his last in football.

== International career ==
Gunnar made appearances for the Iceland U21 team during their unsuccessful qualification campaign for the 1998 European U21 Championship. Gunnar won his only cap for the senior team in a 1–1 friendly draw with South Africa on 6 June 1998, starting the match at right back and playing the full 90 minutes.

== Management career ==
Gunnar was appointed assistant manager to Sigursteinn Gíslason at Leiknir Reykjavík in May 2009. Early in the 2011 season, Gíslason took sick leave after being diagnosed with cancer and Gunnar and former Leiknir boss Garðar Gunnar Ásgeirsson were installed as interim managers. Gunnar and Garðar were relieved of their duties in July 2011, after Gíslason was replaced by Zoran Miljkovic. Gunnar rejoined Leiknir as assistant manager to Willum Þór Þórsson in November 2011. After Þórsson was sacked in September 2012, Gunnar took over as interim manager until the end of the 2012 season.

Prior to June 2020, Gunnar coached at his former club Valur. In June 2020, Gunnar signed an 18-month contract to manage 2. deild karla club Kári. He presided over a mid-table finish, before departing to sign a two-year contract to manage 1. deild karla club Víkingur Ólafsvík in November 2020. With the club bottom of the division midway through the 2021 season, Gunnar was replaced by Guðjón Þórðarson. After a period as assistant, Gunnar was named as head coach of KR Reykjavík Women on 20 January 2024. One month later, Ívar Ingimarsson was appointed as joint-head coach.

== Career statistics ==
Appearances and goals by club, season and competition
Club	Season	League			National cup (Note: Includes Icelandic Cup, KNVB Cup, FA Cup)		League cup (Note: Includes Icelandic League Cup, Football League Cup)		Europe		Other		Total	
Club	Season	Division	Apps	Goals	Apps	Goals	Apps	Goals	Apps	Goals	Apps	Goals	Apps	Goals
Valur	1995	Úrvalsdeild	9	0	5 (Note: 4 appearances for U23 team, 1 appearance for first team)	0	—		—		—		14	0
Valur	1996	Úrvalsdeild	15	0	4 (Note: 3 appearances for first team, 1 appearance for U23 team)	0	0	0	—		—		19	0
Valur	Total		24	0	9	0	0	0	—		—		33	0
MVV (loan)	1996–97	Eerste Divisie	10	0	—		—		—		—		10	0
MVV (loan)	1997–98	Eredivisie	13	0	1	0	—		—		—		14	0
MVV (loan)	Total		23	0	1	0	—		—		—		24	0
VVV (loan)	1998–99	Eerste Divisie	7	0	—		—		—		—		7	0
Brentford (loan)	1999–00	Second Division	2	0	—		—		—		1 (Note: Appearance in Football League Trophy)	0	3	0
KR	2000	Úrvalsdeild	8	0	2	0	0	0	4 (Note: Appearances in Champions League)	0	—		14	0
KR	2001	Úrvalsdeild	18	0	2	0	9	1	2	0	2 (Note: Appearances in Reykjavik Tournament)	0	33	1
KR	2002	Úrvalsdeild	17	1	2	0	6	0	—		5	0	30	1
KR	2003	Úrvalsdeild	17	0	4	0	8	0	2	0	5 (Note: 4 appearances and 1 goal in Reykjavik Tournament, 1 appearance in Icelandic Super Cup)	1	36	1
KR	2004	Úrvalsdeild	16	0	3	0	7	0	2	0	7 (Note: 6 appearances and 1 goal in Reykjavik Tournament, 1 appearance in Atlantic Cup)	1	35	1
KR	2005	Úrvalsdeild	13	0	2	0	4	1	—		1	0	20	1
KR	2006	Úrvalsdeild	7	0	1	0	7	0	—		3	0	18	0
KR	Total		96	1	16	0	41	2	10	0	23	2	186	5
Valur	2007	Úrvalsdeild	8	1	2	0	7	0	2 (Note: Appearances in Intertoto Cup)	0	4	0	23	1
Valur	2008	Úrvalsdeild	5	0	1	0	6	0	0	0	5 (Note: 4 appearances in Reykjavik Tournament, 1 appearance in Icelandic Super Cup)	0	17	0
Valur	Total		37	1	12	0	13	0	2	0	9	0	73	1
Leiknir Reykjavík	2009	1. deild karla	19	1	1	0	0	0	—		0	0	20	1
Leiknir Reykjavík	2010	1. deild karla	15	1	1	0	6	0	—		1	0	23	1
Leiknir Reykjavík	2011	1. deild karla	10	0	0	0	5	0	—		1	0	16	0
Leiknir Reykjavík	Total		44	2	2	0	11	0	—		2	0	59	2
Víkingur	2011	Úrvalsdeild	10	0	—		—		—		—		10	0
Leiknir Reykjavík	2012	1. deild karla	21	2	2	1	6	0	—		2	0	31	3
Leiknir Reykjavík	Total		65	4	4	1	17	0	—		4	0	90	4
Career total			240	6	33	1	71	2	12	0	37	2	393	11

== Honours ==
MVV

- Eerste Divisie: 1996–97

KR

- Úrvalsdeild: 2000, 2002, 2003
- Icelandic League Cup: 2001, 2005
- Icelandic Super Cup: 2003

Valur

- Úrvalsdeild: 2007
- Icelandic League Cup: 2008
- Icelandic Super Cup: 2008
