= 2021 UEFA European Under-21 Championship squads =

Football team member listings

The following is a list of squads for all sixteen national teams that competed at the 2021 UEFA European Under-21 Championship. Each national team had to submit a final squad of 23 players, three of whom had to be goalkeepers.

Players in boldface were capped at full international level at some point in their career.

== Group stage ==
Age, caps, goals and club as of 24 March 2021.

=== Group A ===
==== Germany ====
Head coach: Stefan Kuntz

The squad was announced on 15 March 2021.

No.	Pos.	Player	Date of birth (age)	Caps	Goals	Club
1	GK	Markus Schubert	12 June 1998 (aged 22)	6	0	(German Football Association) Eintracht Frankfurt
2	DF	**Josha Vagnoman**	12 November 2000 (aged 20)	4	0	(German Football Association) Hamburger SV
3	DF	**David Raum**	22 April 1998 (aged 22)	2	0	(German Football Association) Greuther Fürth
4	DF	**Nico Schlotterbeck**	1 December 1999 (aged 21)	7	3	(German Football Association) Union Berlin
5	DF	Amos Pieper	17 January 1998 (aged 23)	4	0	(German Football Association) Arminia Bielefeld
6	MF	Niklas Dorsch	15 January 1998 (aged 23)	8	1	(Royal Belgian Football Association) Gent
7	FW	**Youssoufa Moukoko**	20 November 2004 (aged 16)	0	0	(German Football Association) Borussia Dortmund
8	MF	Arne Maier	8 January 1999 (aged 22)	12	1	(German Football Association) Arminia Bielefeld
9	FW	**Jonathan Burkardt**	11 July 2000 (aged 20)	5	2	(German Football Association) Mainz 05
10	FW	**Lukas Nmecha**	14 December 1998 (aged 22)	14	8	(Royal Belgian Football Association) Anderlecht
11	FW	**Mërgim Berisha**	11 May 1998 (aged 22)	7	1	(Austrian Football Association) Red Bull Salzburg
12	GK	Finn Dahmen	27 March 1998 (aged 22)	2	0	(German Football Association) Mainz 05
13	MF	**Salih Özcan** (Note: Capped for Turkey)	11 January 1998 (aged 23)	11	1	(German Football Association) 1. FC Köln
14	DF	**Stephan Ambrosius** (Note: Capped for Ghana)	18 December 1998 (aged 22)	1	0	(German Football Association) Hamburger SV
15	DF	**Ismail Jakobs** (Note: Capped for Senegal)	17 August 1999 (aged 21)	4	0	(German Football Association) 1. FC Köln
16	MF	**Malick Thiaw**	8 August 2001 (aged 19)	0	0	(German Football Association) Schalke 04
17	MF	**Anton Stach**	15 November 1998 (aged 22)	0	0	(German Football Association) Greuther Fürth
18	FW	Florian Krüger	13 February 1999 (aged 22)	5	1	(German Football Association) Erzgebirge Aue
19	DF	Lars Lukas Mai	31 January 2000 (aged 21)	1	0	(German Football Association) SV Darmstadt 98
20	MF	Vitaly Janelt	10 May 1998 (aged 22)	6	0	(The Football Association) Brentford
21	DF	**Ridle Baku**	8 April 1998 (aged 22)	8	0	(German Football Association) VfL Wolfsburg
22	MF	Mateo Klimowicz	6 July 2000 (aged 20)	0	0	(German Football Association) VfB Stuttgart
23	GK	Lennart Grill	25 January 1999 (aged 22)	7	0	(German Football Association) Bayer Leverkusen

==== Hungary ====
Head coach: Zoltán Gera

The squad was announced on 15 March 2021.

No.	Pos.	Player	Date of birth (age)	Caps	Goals	Club
1	GK	Martin Auerbach	3 November 2002 (aged 18)	0	0	(Hungarian Football Federation) Puskás Akadémia
2	DF	Benedek Varju	21 May 2001 (aged 19)	0	0	(Hungarian Football Federation) MTK Budapest
3	DF	**Attila Mocsi**	29 May 2000 (aged 20)	0	0	(Hungarian Football Federation) Haladás
4	DF	**Botond Balogh**	6 June 2002 (aged 18)	2	0	(Italian Football Federation) Parma
5	DF	András Huszti	29 January 2001 (aged 20)	0	0	(Hungarian Football Federation) Budafok
6	MF	Martin Palincsár	3 January 1999 (aged 22)	4	0	(Hungarian Football Federation) MTK Budapest
7	FW	**Tamás Kiss**	24 November 2000 (aged 20)	3	1	(Hungarian Football Federation) Puskás Akadémia
8	MF	Szabolcs Mezei	18 October 2000 (aged 20)	2	0	(Hungarian Football Federation) MTK Budapest
9	FW	Bence Bíró	14 July 1998 (aged 22)	1	0	(Hungarian Football Federation) MTK Budapest
10	FW	Adrián Szőke	1 July 1998 (aged 22)	2	1	(Royal Dutch Football Association) Heracles Almelo
11	FW	Alen Skribek	11 April 2001 (aged 19)	0	0	(Hungarian Football Federation) Budafok
12	GK	Balázs Bese	22 January 1999 (aged 22)	1	0	(Hungarian Football Federation) Budafok
13	DF	Olivér Tamás	14 April 2001 (aged 19)	0	0	(Hungarian Football Federation) Paks
14	MF	Kristóf Hinora	5 February 1998 (aged 23)	7	0	(Hungarian Football Federation) Vasas
15	MF	**Mihály Kata**	13 April 2002 (aged 18)	0	0	(Hungarian Football Federation) MTK Budapest
16	MF	Norbert Szendrei	27 March 2000 (aged 20)	1	1	(Hungarian Football Federation) Honvéd
17	FW	**Donát Bárány**	4 September 2000 (aged 20)	1	0	(Hungarian Football Federation) Debrecen
18	DF	**Bendegúz Bolla**	22 November 1999 (aged 21)	5	0	(Hungarian Football Federation) Fehérvár
19	DF	László Deutsch	9 March 1999 (aged 22)	1	0	(Hungarian Football Federation) Puskás Akadémia
20	FW	Csaba Bukta	25 July 2001 (aged 19)	0	0	(Austrian Football Association) Rheindorf Altach
21	MF	András Csonka	1 May 2000 (aged 20)	3	0	(Hungarian Football Federation) Budafok
22	GK	Péter Kovács	10 February 2000 (aged 21)	0	0	(Hungarian Football Federation) Budaörs
23	FW	Márk Kovácsréti	1 September 2000 (aged 20)	4	0	(Hungarian Football Federation) Kisvárda

==== Netherlands ====
Head coach: Erwin van de Looi

The squad was announced on 15 March 2021. On 21 March, it was announced that Lutsharel Geertruida would be replacing Jurriën Timber due to illness.

No.	Pos.	Player	Date of birth (age)	Caps	Goals	Club
1	GK	Kjell Scherpen	23 January 2000 (aged 21)	4	0	(Royal Dutch Football Association) Ajax
2	DF	Deyovaisio Zeefuik	11 March 1998 (aged 23)	11	2	(German Football Association) Hertha BSC
3	DF	Perr Schuurs	26 November 1999 (aged 21)	11	0	(Royal Dutch Football Association) Ajax
4	DF	Sven Botman	12 January 2000 (aged 21)	3	0	(French Football Federation) Lille
5	DF	Mitchel Bakker	20 June 2000 (aged 20)	6	0	(French Football Federation) Paris Saint-Germain
6	MF	**Ferdi Kadıoğlu**	7 October 1999 (aged 21)	14	1	(Turkish Football Federation) Fenerbahçe
7	FW	**Justin Kluivert**	5 May 1999 (aged 21)	9	4	(German Football Association) RB Leipzig
8	MF	**Teun Koopmeiners**	28 February 1998 (aged 23)	17	4	(Royal Dutch Football Association) AZ
9	FW	**Myron Boadu**	14 January 2001 (aged 20)	6	6	(Royal Dutch Football Association) AZ
10	MF	Dani de Wit	28 January 1998 (aged 23)	12	10	(Royal Dutch Football Association) AZ
11	FW	**Noa Lang**	17 June 1999 (aged 21)	6	1	(Royal Belgian Football Association) Club Brugge
12	DF	**Jordan Teze**	30 September 1999 (aged 21)	3	0	(Royal Dutch Football Association) PSV Eindhoven
13	DF	Danilho Doekhi	30 June 1998 (aged 22)	4	0	(Royal Dutch Football Association) Vitesse
14	FW	**Cody Gakpo**	7 May 1999 (aged 21)	9	4	(Royal Dutch Football Association) PSV Eindhoven
15	DF	**Tyrell Malacia**	17 August 1999 (aged 21)	4	0	(Royal Dutch Football Association) Feyenoord
16	GK	**Justin Bijlow**	22 January 1998 (aged 23)	11	0	(Royal Dutch Football Association) Feyenoord
17	MF	Jurgen Ekkelenkamp	5 April 2000 (aged 20)	2	3	(Royal Dutch Football Association) Ajax
18	DF	**Lutsharel Geertruida**	18 July 2000 (aged 20)	0	0	(Royal Dutch Football Association) Feyenoord
19	FW	**Brian Brobbey**	1 February 2002 (aged 19)	0	0	(Royal Dutch Football Association) Ajax
20	MF	Abdou Harroui	13 January 1998 (aged 23)	9	1	(Royal Dutch Football Association) Sparta Rotterdam
21	FW	**Javairô Dilrosun**	22 June 1998 (aged 22)	7	2	(German Football Association) Hertha BSC
22	MF	Ludovit Reis	1 June 2000 (aged 20)	8	0	(German Football Association) VfL Osnabrück
23	GK	**Maarten Paes** (Note: Capped for Indonesia)	14 May 1998 (aged 22)	5	0	(Royal Dutch Football Association) Utrecht

==== Romania ====
Head coach: Adrian Mutu

The squad was announced on 16 March 2021. On 19 March, it was announced that Adrian Petre would be replacing Valentin Costache.

No.	Pos.	Player	Date of birth (age)	Caps	Goals	Club
1	GK	**Andrei Vlad**	15 April 1999 (aged 21)	8	0	(Romanian Football Federation) FCSB
2	DF	Radu Boboc	24 April 1999 (aged 21)	12	0	(Romanian Football Federation) Viitorul Constanța
3	DF	**Raul Opruț**	4 January 1998 (aged 23)	2	0	(Romanian Football Federation) Hermannstadt
4	DF	**Alex Pașcanu**	28 September 1998 (aged 22)	23	0	(Royal Spanish Football Federation) Ponferradina
5	DF	**Radu Drăgușin**	3 February 2002 (aged 19)	2	0	(Italian Football Federation) Juventus
6	MF	Marco Dulca	11 May 1999 (aged 21)	5	0	(Romanian Football Federation) Chindia Târgoviște
7	MF	Alexandru Cîmpanu	8 October 2000 (aged 20)	1	0	(Romanian Football Federation) Universitatea Craiova
8	MF	**Marius Marin**	30 August 1998 (aged 22)	7	0	(Italian Football Federation) Pisa
9	FW	George Ganea	26 May 1999 (aged 21)	7	1	(Romanian Football Federation) Viitorul Constanța
10	MF	**Olimpiu Moruțan**	25 April 1999 (aged 21)	9	1	(Romanian Football Federation) FCSB
11	MF	Andrei Ciobanu	18 January 1998 (aged 23)	15	2	(Romanian Football Federation) Viitorul Constanța
12	GK	Mihai Aioani	7 November 1999 (aged 21)	2	0	(Romanian Football Federation) Chindia Târgoviște
13	DF	**Denis Ciobotariu**	10 June 1998 (aged 22)	3	0	(Romanian Football Federation) CFR Cluj
14	MF	Răzvan Oaidă	2 March 1998 (aged 23)	8	0	(Romanian Football Federation) FCSB
15	DF	Andrei Chindriș	12 January 1999 (aged 22)	7	0	(Romanian Football Federation) Botoșani
16	DF	Denis Haruț	25 February 1999 (aged 22)	5	1	(Romanian Football Federation) FCSB
17	MF	**Octavian Popescu**	27 December 2002 (aged 18)	0	0	(Romanian Football Federation) FCSB
18	MF	Cătălin Itu	26 October 1999 (aged 21)	4	0	(Romanian Football Federation) CFR Cluj
19	DF	Ștefan Vlădoiu	28 December 1998 (aged 22)	2	0	(Romanian Football Federation) Universitatea Craiova
20	MF	Alexandru Mățan	29 August 1999 (aged 21)	8	1	(United States Soccer Federation) Columbus Crew
21	FW	Adrian Petre	11 February 1998 (aged 23)	11	5	(Romanian Football Federation) UTA Arad
22	MF	**Darius Olaru**	3 March 1998 (aged 23)	12	1	(Romanian Football Federation) FCSB
23	GK	Mihai Eșanu	25 July 1998 (aged 22)	0	0	(Romanian Football Federation) Dinamo București

=== Group B ===
==== Czech Republic ====
Head coach: Karel Krejčí

The squad was announced on 15 March 2021.

No.	Pos.	Player	Date of birth (age)	Caps	Goals	Club
1	GK	**Matěj Kovář**	17 May 2000 (aged 20)	0	0	(The Football Association) Manchester United
2	DF	**Martin Vitík**	21 January 2003 (aged 18)	0	0	(Football Association of the Czech Republic) Sparta Prague
3	DF	**Matěj Chaluš**	2 February 1998 (aged 23)	13	0	(Football Association of the Czech Republic) Slovan Liberec
4	DF	Libor Holík	12 May 1998 (aged 22)	12	1	(Football Association of the Czech Republic) Jablonec
5	DF	Dominik Plechatý	18 April 1999 (aged 21)	11	0	(Football Association of the Czech Republic) Sparta Prague
6	MF	**Michal Sadílek**	31 May 1999 (aged 21)	11	0	(Football Association of the Czech Republic) Slovan Liberec
7	MF	Pavel Bucha	11 March 1998 (aged 23)	11	2	(Football Association of the Czech Republic) Viktoria Plzeň
8	MF	Filip Havelka	21 January 1998 (aged 23)	11	0	(Football Association of the Czech Republic) České Budějovice
9	MF	Dominik Janošek	13 June 1998 (aged 22)	13	2	(Football Association of the Czech Republic) Fastav Zlín
10	FW	Ondřej Šašinka	21 March 1998 (aged 23)	11	5	(Football Association of the Czech Republic) Baník Ostrava
11	DF	**Ladislav Krejčí**	20 April 1999 (aged 21)	9	5	(Football Association of the Czech Republic) Sparta Prague
12	FW	**Ondřej Lingr**	7 October 1998 (aged 22)	4	0	(Football Association of the Czech Republic) Slavia Prague
13	MF	Michal Kohút	4 June 2000 (aged 20)	1	0	(Football Association of the Czech Republic) Slovácko
14	MF	Patrik Žitný	21 January 1999 (aged 22)	9	1	(Football Association of the Czech Republic) Teplice
15	DF	Michal Fukala	22 October 2000 (aged 20)	0	0	(Football Association of the Czech Republic) Slovan Liberec
16	GK	Martin Jedlička	24 January 1998 (aged 23)	10	0	(Slovak Football Association) DAC Dunajská Streda
17	MF	Tomáš Ostrák	5 February 2000 (aged 21)	1	0	(Football Association of the Czech Republic) Karviná
18	DF	Denis Granečný	7 September 1998 (aged 22)	13	0	(Royal Dutch Football Association) Emmen
19	MF	**Adam Karabec**	2 July 2003 (aged 17)	1	0	(Football Association of the Czech Republic) Sparta Prague
20	FW	Václav Drchal	25 July 1999 (aged 21)	6	3	(Football Association of the Czech Republic) Mladá Boleslav
21	MF	**Pavel Šulc**	29 December 2000 (aged 20)	4	1	(Football Association of the Czech Republic) Viktoria Plzeň
22	MF	Antonín Vaníček	22 April 1998 (aged 22)	17	1	(Football Association of the Czech Republic) Bohemians 1905
23	GK	Matouš Trmal	2 October 1998 (aged 22)	4	0	(Portuguese Football Federation) Vitória de Guimarães

==== Italy ====
Head coach: Paolo Nicolato

The squad was announced on 15 March 2021. On 19 March, Andrea Pinamonti was replaced by Lorenzo Colombo, because of his unavailability due to COVID-19 quarantine restrictions applied to Inter Milan players. On 23 March, Samuele Ricci withdrew from the squad, with Andrea Pinamonti subsequently returning to the official squad list, though he was not present at the tournament.

No.	Pos.	Player	Date of birth (age)	Caps	Goals	Club
1	GK	Alessandro Plizzari	12 March 2000 (aged 21)	2	0	(Italian Football Federation) Reggina
2	DF	**Raoul Bellanova**	17 May 2000 (aged 20)	3	0	(Italian Football Federation) Pescara
3	DF	Gianluca Frabotta	24 June 1999 (aged 21)	2	0	(Italian Football Federation) Juventus
4	DF	Matteo Gabbia	21 October 1999 (aged 21)	5	0	(Italian Football Federation) Milan
5	DF	Riccardo Marchizza	26 March 1998 (aged 22)	7	1	(Italian Football Federation) Spezia
6	DF	Matteo Lovato	14 February 2000 (aged 21)	2	0	(Italian Football Federation) Hellas Verona
7	MF	**Davide Frattesi**	22 September 1999 (aged 21)	6	2	(Italian Football Federation) Monza
8	MF	**Sandro Tonali**	8 May 2000 (aged 20)	6	0	(Italian Football Federation) Milan
9	FW	Lorenzo Colombo	9 March 2002 (aged 19)	0	0	(Italian Football Federation) Cremonese
10	FW	**Patrick Cutrone**	3 January 1998 (aged 23)	21	8	(Royal Spanish Football Federation) Valencia
11	FW	**Gianluca Scamacca**	1 January 1999 (aged 22)	12	7	(Italian Football Federation) Genoa
12	GK	Marco Carnesecchi	1 July 2000 (aged 20)	8	0	(Italian Football Federation) Cremonese
13	DF	**Luca Ranieri**	23 April 1999 (aged 21)	5	0	(Italian Football Federation) SPAL
14	MF	**Nicolò Rovella**	4 December 2001 (aged 19)	2	0	(Italian Football Federation) Genoa
15	DF	Enrico Del Prato	10 November 1999 (aged 21)	9	1	(Italian Football Federation) Reggina
16	DF	Lorenzo Pirola	20 February 2002 (aged 19)	1	0	(Italian Football Federation) Monza
17	DF	Gabriele Zappa	22 December 1999 (aged 21)	1	0	(Italian Football Federation) Cagliari
18	MF	**Tommaso Pobega**	15 July 1999 (aged 21)	2	2	(Italian Football Federation) Spezia
19	DF	Marco Sala	4 June 1999 (aged 21)	9	0	(Italian Football Federation) SPAL
20	FW	**Giacomo Raspadori**	18 February 2000 (aged 21)	4	2	(Italian Football Federation) Sassuolo
21	MF	Giulio Maggiore	12 March 1998 (aged 23)	5	0	(Italian Football Federation) Spezia
22	GK	Michele Cerofolini	4 January 1999 (aged 22)	2	0	(Italian Football Federation) Reggiana
23	FW	**Andrea Pinamonti**	19 May 1999 (aged 21)	9	2	(Italian Football Federation) Inter

==== Slovenia ====
Head coach: Milenko Ačimovič

No.	Pos.	Player	Date of birth (age)	Caps	Goals	Club
1	GK	**Igor Vekić**	6 May 1998 (aged 22)	4	0	(Football Association of Slovenia) Bravo
2	DF	**Žan Rogelj**	25 November 1999 (aged 21)	10	0	(Austrian Football Association) WSG Tirol
3	DF	Dušan Stojinović	26 August 2000 (aged 20)	7	0	(Football Association of Slovenia) Celje
4	DF	**David Brekalo**	3 December 1998 (aged 22)	11	1	(Football Association of Slovenia) Bravo
5	DF	**Žan Zaletel**	16 December 1999 (aged 21)	10	0	(Football Association of Slovenia) Celje
6	MF	Jan Gorenc	26 July 1999 (aged 21)	3	0	(Football Association of Slovenia) Mura
7	MF	**Tomi Horvat**	24 March 1999 (aged 22)	8	1	(Football Association of Slovenia) Mura
8	MF	**Dejan Petrovič**	12 January 1998 (aged 23)	9	2	(Austrian Football Association) Rapid Wien
9	FW	Žan Medved	14 June 1999 (aged 21)	3	2	(Polish Football Association) Wisła Kraków
10	MF	**Timi Max Elšnik**	29 April 1998 (aged 22)	3	0	(Football Association of Slovenia) Olimpija Ljubljana
11	FW	**Žan Celar**	14 March 1999 (aged 22)	8	1	(Italian Football Federation) Cremonese
12	GK	Martin Turk	21 August 2003 (aged 17)	0	0	(Italian Football Federation) Parma
13	DF	Andraž Žinič	12 February 1999 (aged 22)	0	0	(Football Association of Slovenia) Domžale
14	MF	**Tamar Svetlin**	30 July 2001 (aged 19)	2	0	(Football Association of Slovenia) Domžale
15	MF	Sandi Ogrinec	5 June 1998 (aged 22)	2	0	(Football Association of Slovenia) Bravo
16	MF	**Adam Gnezda Čerin**	16 July 1999 (aged 21)	9	0	(Croatian Football Federation) Rijeka
17	FW	Aljoša Matko	29 March 2000 (aged 20)	3	1	(Football Association of Slovenia) Maribor
18	FW	Dario Kolobarić	6 February 2000 (aged 21)	0	0	(Football Association of Slovenia) Domžale
19	FW	Nik Prelec	10 June 2001 (aged 19)	1	1	(Italian Football Federation) Sampdoria
20	DF	**Sven Karič**	7 March 1998 (aged 23)	0	0	(Football Association of Slovenia) Domžale
21	DF	Aljaž Ploj	30 August 1998 (aged 22)	5	0	(Football Association of Slovenia) Aluminij
22	GK	Žan-Luk Leban	15 December 2002 (aged 18)	0	0	(The Football Association) Everton
23	DF	Žan Kolmanič	3 March 2000 (aged 21)	1	0	(United States Soccer Federation) Austin FC

==== Spain ====
Head coach: Luis de la Fuente

The squad was announced on 15 March 2021. On 19 March, Mateu Morey withdrew injured and was replaced by Yéremy Pino.

No.	Pos.	Player	Date of birth (age)	Caps	Goals	Club
1	GK	**Álvaro Fernández**	13 April 1998 (aged 22)	5	0	(Royal Spanish Football Federation) Huesca
2	DF	Pipa	26 January 1998 (aged 23)	3	0	(The Football Association) Huddersfield Town
3	DF	Adrià Pedrosa	13 May 1998 (aged 22)	7	2	(Royal Spanish Football Federation) Espanyol
4	DF	**Hugo Guillamón**	31 January 2000 (aged 21)	4	1	(Royal Spanish Football Federation) Valencia
5	DF	Jorge Cuenca	17 November 1999 (aged 21)	7	0	(Royal Spanish Football Federation) Almería
6	MF	**Martín Zubimendi**	2 February 1999 (aged 22)	3	0	(Royal Spanish Football Federation) Real Sociedad
7	DF	**Alejandro Pozo**	19 February 1999 (aged 22)	8	0	(Royal Spanish Football Federation) Eibar
8	MF	**Fran Beltrán**	3 February 1999 (aged 22)	9	0	(Royal Spanish Football Federation) Celta Vigo
9	FW	**Abel Ruiz**	28 January 2000 (aged 21)	3	0	(Portuguese Football Federation) Braga
10	MF	**Gonzalo Villar**	23 March 1998 (aged 23)	5	0	(Italian Football Federation) Roma
11	MF	**Marc Cucurella**	22 July 1998 (aged 22)	7	1	(Royal Spanish Football Federation) Getafe
12	DF	**Juan Miranda**	19 January 2000 (aged 21)	3	0	(Royal Spanish Football Federation) Real Betis
13	GK	**Josep Martínez**	27 May 1998 (aged 22)	3	0	(German Football Association) RB Leipzig
14	DF	**Óscar Mingueza**	13 May 1999 (aged 21)	0	0	(Royal Spanish Football Federation) Barcelona
15	MF	Jon Moncayola	13 May 1998 (aged 22)	4	1	(Royal Spanish Football Federation) Osasuna
16	MF	**Manu García**	2 January 1998 (aged 23)	5	2	(Royal Spanish Football Federation) Sporting Gijón
17	MF	**Brahim Díaz** (Note: Capped for Morocco)	3 August 1999 (aged 21)	5	2	(Italian Football Federation) Milan
18	FW	**Javi Puado**	25 May 1998 (aged 22)	5	0	(Royal Spanish Football Federation) Espanyol
19	FW	Dani Gómez	30 July 1998 (aged 22)	6	2	(Royal Spanish Football Federation) Levante
20	MF	Riqui Puig	13 August 1999 (aged 21)	3	0	(Royal Spanish Football Federation) Barcelona
21	FW	**Ander Barrenetxea**	27 December 2001 (aged 19)	2	1	(Royal Spanish Football Federation) Real Sociedad
22	MF	**Yéremy Pino**	20 October 2002 (aged 18)	0	0	(Royal Spanish Football Federation) Villarreal
23	GK	Álex Domínguez	30 July 1998 (aged 22)	0	0	(Royal Spanish Football Federation) Las Palmas

=== Group C ===
==== Denmark ====
Head coach: (Spain) Albert Capellas

The squad was announced on 15 March 2021.

No.	Pos.	Player	Date of birth (age)	Caps	Goals	Club
1	GK	**Oliver Christensen**	22 March 1999 (aged 22)	10	0	(Danish Football Association) OB
2	DF	**Mads Roerslev**	24 June 1999 (aged 21)	5	0	(The Football Association) Brentford
3	DF	Andreas Poulsen	13 October 1999 (aged 21)	14	1	(Austrian Football Association) Austria Vienna
4	DF	Mads Bech Sørensen	7 January 1999 (aged 22)	6	0	(The Football Association) Brentford
5	DF	**Victor Nelsson**	14 October 1998 (aged 22)	31	1	(Danish Football Association) Copenhagen
6	MF	**Nikolas Nartey**	22 February 2000 (aged 21)	10	1	(German Football Association) SV Sandhausen
7	FW	Nikolai Laursen	19 February 1998 (aged 23)	10	4	(Royal Dutch Football Association) Emmen
8	MF	**Jesper Lindstrøm**	29 February 2000 (aged 21)	4	2	(Danish Football Association) Brøndby
9	FW	Nikolai Baden	18 May 2000 (aged 20)	0	0	(Austrian Football Association) WSG Tirol
10	FW	**Jacob Bruun Larsen**	19 September 1998 (aged 22)	21	6	(Royal Belgian Football Association) Anderlecht
11	FW	**Anders Dreyer**	2 May 1998 (aged 22)	17	0	(Danish Football Association) Midtjylland
12	DF	Sebastian Hausner	11 April 2000 (aged 20)	1	0	(Danish Football Association) AGF
13	DF	Frederik Alves	8 November 1999 (aged 21)	5	0	(The Football Association) West Ham United
14	MF	**Morten Hjulmand**	25 June 1999 (aged 21)	7	0	(Italian Football Federation) Lecce
15	DF	Rasmus Carstensen	1 January 2000 (aged 21)	4	0	(Danish Football Association) Silkeborg
16	GK	Peter Vindahl	16 February 1998 (aged 23)	4	0	(Danish Football Association) Nordsjælland
17	FW	**Mohamed Daramy**	7 January 2002 (aged 19)	3	0	(Danish Football Association) Copenhagen
18	MF	Victor Jensen	8 February 2000 (aged 21)	3	2	(Danish Football Association) Nordsjælland
19	FW	**Gustav Isaksen**	19 April 2001 (aged 19)	4	0	(Danish Football Association) Midtjylland
20	MF	Magnus Kofod Andersen	10 May 1999 (aged 21)	21	0	(Danish Football Association) Nordsjælland
21	FW	Carlo Holse	2 June 1999 (aged 21)	14	1	(Norwegian Football Federation) Rosenborg
22	GK	**Mads Hermansen**	11 July 2000 (aged 20)	0	0	(Danish Football Association) Brøndby
23	FW	Wahid Faghir	29 July 2003 (aged 17)	0	0	(Danish Football Association) Vejle

==== France ====
Head coach: Sylvain Ripoll

The squad was announced on 15 March 2021. On 21 March, Houssem Aouar and Moussa Diaby were ruled out due to injury and replaced by Armand Laurienté and Alexis Claude-Maurice.

No.	Pos.	Player	Date of birth (age)	Caps	Goals	Club
1	GK	**Alban Lafont** (Note: Capped for Ivory Coast)	23 January 1999 (aged 22)	11	0	(French Football Federation) Nantes
2	DF	**Pierre Kalulu**	5 June 2000 (aged 20)	0	0	(Italian Football Federation) Milan
3	DF	**Wesley Fofana**	17 December 2000 (aged 20)	2	0	(The Football Association) Leicester City
4	MF	**Boubacar Kamara**	23 November 1999 (aged 21)	8	0	(French Football Federation) Marseille
5	DF	**Benoît Badiashile**	26 March 2001 (aged 19)	4	0	(French Football Federation) Monaco
6	DF	**Ibrahima Konaté**	25 May 1999 (aged 21)	11	0	(German Football Association) RB Leipzig
7	DF	**Adrien Truffert**	20 January 2001 (aged 20)	2	0	(French Football Federation) Rennes
8	FW	Alexis Claude-Maurice	6 June 1998 (aged 22)	0	0	(French Football Federation) Nice
9	FW	**Amine Gouiri** (Note: Capped for Algeria)	16 February 2000 (aged 21)	8	4	(French Football Federation) Nice
10	MF	**Mattéo Guendouzi**	14 April 1999 (aged 21)	17	0	(German Football Association) Hertha BSC
11	FW	**Jonathan Ikoné**	2 May 1998 (aged 22)	14	3	(French Football Federation) Lille
12	DF	**Jules Koundé**	12 November 1998 (aged 22)	5	1	(Royal Spanish Football Federation) Sevilla
13	DF	Colin Dagba	9 September 1998 (aged 22)	13	1	(French Football Federation) Paris Saint-Germain
14	MF	**Aurélien Tchouaméni**	27 January 2000 (aged 21)	0	0	(French Football Federation) Monaco
15	MF	Romain Faivre	14 July 1998 (aged 22)	4	2	(French Football Federation) Brest
16	GK	**Dimitry Bertaud** (Note: Capped for DR Congo)	6 June 1998 (aged 22)	1	0	(French Football Federation) Montpellier
17	MF	**Eduardo Camavinga**	10 November 2002 (aged 18)	1	0	(French Football Federation) Rennes
18	FW	**Randal Kolo Muani**	5 December 1998 (aged 22)	4	1	(French Football Federation) Nantes
19	FW	Armand Laurienté	4 December 1998 (aged 22)	0	0	(French Football Federation) Lorient
20	MF	Boubakary Soumaré	27 February 1999 (aged 22)	10	0	(French Football Federation) Lille
21	DF	Faitout Maouassa	6 June 1998 (aged 22)	3	0	(French Football Federation) Rennes
22	FW	Odsonne Édouard	16 January 1998 (aged 23)	10	15	(Scottish Football Association) Celtic
23	GK	Illan Meslier	2 March 2000 (aged 21)	0	0	(The Football Association) Leeds United

==== Iceland ====
Head coach: Davíð Snorri Jónasson

The squad was announced on 18 March 2021.

No.	Pos.	Player	Date of birth (age)	Caps	Goals	Club
1	GK	Elías Rafn Ólafsson	11 March 2000 (aged 21)	4	0	(Danish Football Association) Fredericia
2	DF	Finnur Tómas Pálmason	12 February 2001 (aged 20)	3	0	(Swedish Football Association) IFK Norrköping
3	DF	Valgeir Lunddal Friðriksson	24 September 2001 (aged 19)	1	0	(Swedish Football Association) BK Häcken
4	DF	Róbert Orri Þorkelsson	3 April 2002 (aged 18)	3	0	(Football Association of Iceland) Breiðablik
5	DF	Ísak Ólafsson	30 June 2000 (aged 20)	8	2	(Danish Football Association) SønderjyskE
6	MF	Alex Þór Hauksson	26 November 1999 (aged 21)	18	1	(Swedish Football Association) Öster
7	MF	Ísak Bergmann Jóhannesson	23 March 2003 (aged 18)	4	0	(Swedish Football Association) IFK Norrköping
8	MF	Andri Baldursson	10 January 2002 (aged 19)	3	0	(Italian Football Federation) Bologna
9	MF	Stefán Teitur Þórðarson	16 October 1998 (aged 22)	14	1	(Danish Football Association) Silkeborg
10	MF	Mikael Anderson	1 July 1998 (aged 22)	13	0	(Danish Football Association) Midtjylland
11	MF	Jón Dagur Þorsteinsson	26 November 1998 (aged 22)	21	5	(Danish Football Association) AGF
12	GK	Hákon Rafn Valdimarsson	13 October 2001 (aged 19)	0	0	(Football Association of Iceland) Grótta
13	GK	Patrik Gunnarsson	15 November 2000 (aged 20)	10	0	(Danish Football Association) Silkeborg IF
14	FW	Brynjólfur Willumsson	12 August 2000 (aged 20)	12	1	(Norwegian Football Federation) Kristiansund
15	FW	Valdimar Þór Ingimundarson	28 April 1999 (aged 21)	8	1	(Norwegian Football Federation) Strømsgodset
16	DF	Hörður Ingi Gunnarsson	14 August 1998 (aged 22)	15	0	(Football Association of Iceland) FH
17	FW	Sveinn Aron Guðjohnsen	12 May 1998 (aged 22)	15	6	(Danish Football Association) OB
18	MF	Willum Þór Willumsson	23 October 1998 (aged 22)	17	3	(Football Federation of Belarus) BATE Borisov
19	FW	Bjarki Steinn Bjarkason	11 May 2000 (aged 20)	2	0	(Italian Football Federation) Venezia
20	MF	Kolbeinn Finnsson	25 August 1999 (aged 21)	15	0	(German Football Association) Borussia Dortmund
21	MF	Þórir Jóhann Helgason	28 September 2000 (aged 20)	6	0	(Football Association of Iceland) FH
22	MF	Kolbeinn Þórðarson	12 March 2000 (aged 21)	6	0	(Royal Belgian Football Association) Lommel
23	DF	Ari Leifsson	19 August 1998 (aged 22)	17	1	(Norwegian Football Federation) Strømsgodset

==== Russia ====
Head coach: Mikhail Galaktionov

The squad was announced on 15 March 2021. On 20 March, Konstantin Kuchayev was ruled out due to an injury and replaced by Konstantin Tyukavin.

No.	Pos.	Player	Date of birth (age)	Caps	Goals	Club
1	GK	Ivan Lomayev	21 January 1999 (aged 22)	1	0	(Russian Football Union) Krylia Sovetov Samara
2	DF	**Nair Tiknizyan** (Note: Capped for Armenia)	12 May 1999 (aged 21)	4	0	(Russian Football Union) CSKA Moscow
3	DF	**Igor Diveyev**	27 September 1999 (aged 21)	10	3	(Russian Football Union) CSKA Moscow
4	DF	**Roman Yevgenyev**	23 February 1999 (aged 22)	12	1	(Russian Football Union) Dynamo Moscow
5	DF	**Danil Krugovoy**	28 May 1998 (aged 22)	6	1	(Russian Football Union) Zenit Saint Petersburg
6	DF	Artyom Golubev	21 January 1999 (aged 22)	9	0	(Russian Football Union) Ufa
7	MF	Aleksandr Lomovitsky	27 January 1998 (aged 23)	14	2	(Russian Football Union) Arsenal Tula
8	FW	**Konstantin Tyukavin**	22 June 2002 (aged 18)	0	0	(Russian Football Union) Dynamo Moscow
9	FW	**Fyodor Chalov**	10 April 1998 (aged 22)	20	10	(Russian Football Union) CSKA Moscow
10	MF	**Ivan Oblyakov**	5 July 1998 (aged 22)	27	6	(Russian Football Union) CSKA Moscow
11	MF	Magomed-Shapi Suleymanov	16 December 1999 (aged 21)	10	3	(Russian Football Union) Krasnodar
12	GK	**Aleksandr Maksimenko**	19 March 1998 (aged 23)	10	0	(Russian Football Union) Spartak Moscow
13	FW	Denis Makarov	18 February 1998 (aged 23)	3	0	(Russian Football Union) Rubin Kazan
14	DF	Pavel Maslov	14 April 2000 (aged 20)	5	0	(Russian Football Union) Spartak Moscow
15	MF	Daniil Kulikov	24 June 1998 (aged 22)	2	0	(Russian Football Union) Lokomotiv Moscow
16	DF	Nikita Kalugin	12 March 1998 (aged 23)	10	1	(Russian Football Union) Neftekhimik Nizhnekamsk
17	FW	Vyacheslav Grulyov	23 March 1999 (aged 22)	11	3	(Russian Football Union) Dynamo Moscow
18	MF	**Daniil Utkin**	12 October 1999 (aged 21)	10	1	(Russian Football Union) Krasnodar
19	MF	Daniil Lesovoy	12 January 1998 (aged 23)	7	1	(Russian Football Union) Dynamo Moscow
20	MF	Nail Umyarov	27 June 2000 (aged 20)	8	1	(Russian Football Union) Spartak Moscow
21	MF	**Danil Glebov**	3 November 1999 (aged 21)	12	2	(Russian Football Union) Rostov
22	MF	**Arsen Zakharyan**	26 May 2003 (aged 17)	0	0	(Russian Football Union) Dynamo Moscow
23	GK	**Denis Adamov**	20 February 1998 (aged 23)	0	0	(Russian Football Union) Sochi

=== Group D ===
==== Croatia ====
Head coach: Igor Bišćan

The squad was announced on 9 March 2021. On 18 March, Joško Gvardiol was ruled out due to an injury and replaced by David Čolina. On 21 March, Luka Sučić was ruled out due to an injury and replaced by Matej Vuk. On 22 March, Borna Sosa was ruled out due to an injury and replaced by Hrvoje Babec.

No.	Pos.	Player	Date of birth (age)	Caps	Goals	Club
1	GK	Adrian Šemper	12 January 1998 (aged 23)	11	0	(Italian Football Federation) Chievo
2	DF	Marin Šverko	4 February 1998 (aged 23)	8	1	(German Football Association) 1. FC Saarbrücken
3	MF	Hrvoje Babec	28 July 1999 (aged 21)	0	0	(Croatian Football Federation) Gorica
4	DF	David Čolina	19 July 2000 (aged 20)	4	0	(Croatian Football Federation) Hajduk Split
5	DF	**Martin Erlić**	24 January 1998 (aged 23)	4	0	(Italian Football Federation) Spezia
6	MF	Darko Nejašmić	25 January 1999 (aged 22)	8	2	(Croatian Football Federation) Hajduk Split
7	MF	**Luka Ivanušec**	26 November 1998 (aged 22)	24	8	(Croatian Football Federation) Dinamo Zagreb
8	MF	**Nikola Moro**	12 March 1998 (aged 23)	20	5	(Russian Football Union) Dynamo Moscow
9	FW	Sandro Kulenović	4 December 1999 (aged 21)	13	6	(Croatian Football Federation) Rijeka
10	MF	**Lovro Majer**	17 January 1998 (aged 23)	16	5	(Croatian Football Federation) Dinamo Zagreb
11	DF	**Domagoj Bradarić**	10 December 1999 (aged 21)	10	0	(French Football Federation) Lille
12	GK	**Dominik Kotarski**	10 February 2000 (aged 21)	2	0	(Royal Dutch Football Association) Ajax
13	MF	Mihael Žaper	11 August 1998 (aged 22)	5	0	(Croatian Football Federation) Osijek
14	FW	Dario Vizinger	6 June 1998 (aged 22)	3	1	(Austrian Football Association) Wolfsberger AC
15	DF	Krešimir Krizmanić	3 July 2000 (aged 20)	2	0	(Croatian Football Federation) Gorica
16	MF	Bartol Franjić	14 January 2000 (aged 21)	1	0	(Croatian Football Federation) Dinamo Zagreb
17	MF	Kristijan Bistrović	9 April 1998 (aged 22)	14	4	(Turkish Football Federation) Kasımpaşa
18	FW	Marko Divković	30 June 1999 (aged 21)	1	0	(Slovak Football Association) DAC Dunajská Streda
19	FW	Matej Vuk	10 June 2000 (aged 20)	1	0	(Croatian Football Federation) Istra 1961
20	FW	**Petar Musa**	4 March 1998 (aged 23)	8	4	(German Football Association) Union Berlin
21	FW	Dario Špikić	22 March 1999 (aged 22)	6	2	(Croatian Football Federation) Gorica
22	DF	Mario Vušković	16 November 2001 (aged 19)	2	0	(Croatian Football Federation) Hajduk Split
23	GK	Ivan Nevistić	31 July 1998 (aged 22)	1	0	(Croatian Football Federation) Rijeka

==== England ====
Head coach: Aidy Boothroyd

The squad was announced on 15 March 2021. On 23 March, Todd Cantwell was called up to replace the injured Mason Greenwood.

No.	Pos.	Player	Date of birth (age)	Caps	Goals	Club
1	GK	**Aaron Ramsdale**	14 May 1998 (aged 22)	9	0	(The Football Association) Sheffield United
2	DF	Max Aarons	4 January 2000 (aged 21)	7	0	(The Football Association) Norwich City
3	DF	Lloyd Kelly	6 October 1998 (aged 22)	7	0	(The Football Association) Bournemouth
4	DF	Ben Godfrey	15 January 1998 (aged 23)	5	1	(The Football Association) Everton
5	DF	**Marc Guéhi**	13 July 2000 (aged 20)	8	0	(Football Association of Wales) Swansea City
6	MF	Tom Davies	30 June 1998 (aged 22)	19	1	(The Football Association) Everton
7	FW	Todd Cantwell	27 February 1998 (aged 23)	3	0	(The Football Association) Norwich City
8	MF	**Conor Gallagher**	6 February 2000 (aged 21)	5	1	(The Football Association) West Bromwich Albion
9	FW	**Eddie Nketiah**	30 May 1999 (aged 21)	10	12	(The Football Association) Arsenal
10	FW	**Callum Hudson-Odoi**	7 November 2000 (aged 20)	4	2	(The Football Association) Chelsea
11	DF	Ryan Sessegnon	18 May 2000 (aged 20)	16	1	(German Football Association) 1899 Hoffenheim
12	DF	Ben Wilmot	4 November 1999 (aged 21)	1	0	(The Football Association) Watford
13	GK	Josef Bursik	12 July 2000 (aged 20)	1	0	(The Football Association) Stoke City
14	DF	Steven Sessegnon	18 May 2000 (aged 20)	3	0	(The Football Association) Bristol City
15	DF	Japhet Tanganga	31 March 1999 (aged 21)	0	0	(The Football Association) Tottenham Hotspur
16	MF	Oliver Skipp	16 September 2000 (aged 20)	5	0	(The Football Association) Tottenham Hotspur
17	MF	**Curtis Jones**	31 January 2001 (aged 20)	3	1	(The Football Association) Liverpool
18	MF	**Emile Smith Rowe**	28 July 2000 (aged 20)	0	0	(The Football Association) Arsenal
19	FW	Rhian Brewster	1 April 2000 (aged 20)	8	0	(The Football Association) Sheffield United
20	MF	**Eberechi Eze**	29 June 1998 (aged 22)	2	0	(The Football Association) Crystal Palace
21	MF	Dwight McNeil	22 November 1999 (aged 21)	3	0	(The Football Association) Burnley
22	GK	Josh Griffiths	5 September 2001 (aged 19)	0	0	(The Football Association) Cheltenham Town
23	MF	**Noni Madueke**	10 March 2002 (aged 19)	0	0	(Royal Dutch Football Association) PSV Eindhoven

==== Portugal ====
Head coach: Rui Jorge

The squad was announced on 15 March 2021. On 19 March 2021, forwards Rafael Leão and Jota Filipe were ruled out of the tournament due to injury, being replaced by Gonçalo Ramos and João Mário.

No.	Pos.	Player	Date of birth (age)	Caps	Goals	Club
1	GK	**Diogo Costa**	19 September 1999 (aged 21)	10	0	(Portuguese Football Federation) Porto
2	DF	Thierry Correia	9 March 1999 (aged 22)	7	0	(Royal Spanish Football Federation) Valencia
3	DF	Diogo Leite	23 January 1999 (aged 22)	16	2	(Portuguese Football Federation) Porto
4	DF	Diogo Queirós	5 January 1999 (aged 22)	10	3	(Portuguese Football Federation) Famalicão
5	DF	**Diogo Dalot**	15 March 1999 (aged 22)	9	0	(Italian Football Federation) Milan
6	MF	Florentino Luís	19 August 1999 (aged 21)	7	0	(French Football Federation) Monaco
7	MF	**Vitinha**	13 February 2000 (aged 21)	11	0	(The Football Association) Wolverhampton Wanderers
8	MF	**Gedson Fernandes**	9 January 1999 (aged 22)	11	1	(Turkish Football Federation) Galatasaray
9	FW	**Gonçalo Ramos**	20 June 2001 (aged 19)	3	1	(Portuguese Football Federation) Benfica
10	MF	Daniel Bragança	27 May 1999 (aged 21)	7	0	(Portuguese Football Federation) Sporting CP
11	FW	Dany Mota	2 May 1998 (aged 22)	11	4	(Italian Football Federation) Monza
12	GK	Luís Maximiano	5 January 1999 (aged 22)	2	0	(Portuguese Football Federation) Sporting CP
13	DF	Tomás Tavares	7 March 2001 (aged 20)	5	0	(Portuguese Football Federation) Farense
14	DF	Pedro Pereira	22 January 1998 (aged 23)	4	0	(Italian Football Federation) Crotone
15	DF	**Tiago Djaló**	9 April 2000 (aged 20)	3	0	(French Football Federation) Lille
16	MF	Filipe Soares	20 May 1999 (aged 21)	1	0	(Portuguese Football Federation) Moreirense
17	FW	**Francisco Trincão**	29 December 1999 (aged 21)	5	1	(Royal Spanish Football Federation) Barcelona
18	MF	**Pedro Gonçalves**	28 June 1998 (aged 22)	5	2	(Portuguese Football Federation) Sporting CP
19	FW	Tiago Tomás	16 June 2002 (aged 18)	0	0	(Portuguese Football Federation) Sporting CP
20	FW	**João Mário**	3 January 2000 (aged 21)	3	1	(Portuguese Football Federation) Porto
21	FW	**Francisco Conceição**	14 December 2002 (aged 18)	0	0	(Portuguese Football Federation) Porto
22	GK	João Virgínia	10 October 1999 (aged 21)	2	0	(The Football Association) Everton
23	MF	Fábio Vieira	30 May 2000 (aged 20)	7	5	(Portuguese Football Federation) Porto

==== Switzerland ====
Head coach: Mauro Lustrinelli

The squad was announced on 15 March 2021. On 20 March, Noah Okafor withdrew injured and was replaced by Kevin Rüegg.

No.	Pos.	Player	Date of birth (age)	Caps	Goals	Club
1	GK	Philipp Köhn	2 April 1998 (aged 22)	4	0	(Swiss Football Association) Wil
2	DF	Jasper van der Werff	9 December 1998 (aged 22)	7	0	(Swiss Football Association) Basel
3	DF	Silvan Sidler	7 July 1998 (aged 22)	13	1	(Swiss Football Association) Luzern
4	DF	Jan Bamert	9 March 1998 (aged 23)	13	1	(Swiss Football Association) Sion
5	DF	**Cédric Zesiger**	24 June 1998 (aged 22)	15	0	(Swiss Football Association) Young Boys
6	MF	**Toni Domgjoni** (Note: Capped for Kosovo)	4 September 1998 (aged 22)	15	0	(Swiss Football Association) Zürich
7	DF	Kevin Rüegg	5 August 1998 (aged 22)	14	0	(Italian Football Federation) Hellas Verona
8	MF	Bastien Toma	24 June 1999 (aged 21)	15	2	(Royal Belgian Football Association) Genk
9	FW	Jérémy Guillemenot	6 January 1998 (aged 23)	14	4	(Swiss Football Association) St. Gallen
10	MF	Petar Pušić	25 January 1999 (aged 22)	15	2	(Swiss Football Association) Grasshopper
11	FW	**Andi Zeqiri**	22 June 1999 (aged 21)	13	11	(The Football Association) Brighton & Hove Albion
12	GK	**Timothy Fayulu**	24 July 1999 (aged 21)	0	0	(Swiss Football Association) Sion
13	MF	**Fabian Rieder**	16 February 2002 (aged 19)	0	0	(Swiss Football Association) Young Boys
14	FW	**Dan Ndoye**	25 October 2000 (aged 20)	9	4	(French Football Federation) Nice
15	DF	**Leonidas Stergiou**	3 March 2002 (aged 19)	1	0	(Swiss Football Association) St. Gallen
16	MF	**Simon Sohm**	11 April 2001 (aged 19)	2	0	(Italian Football Federation) Parma
17	MF	**Kastriot Imeri**	27 June 2000 (aged 20)	6	1	(Swiss Football Association) Servette
18	FW	Filip Stojilković	4 January 2000 (aged 21)	7	2	(Swiss Football Association) Aarau
19	FW	Felix Mambimbi	18 January 2001 (aged 20)	4	0	(Swiss Football Association) Young Boys
20	DF	**Miro Muheim**	24 March 1998 (aged 23)	3	0	(Swiss Football Association) St. Gallen
21	GK	Anthony Racioppi	31 December 1998 (aged 22)	10	0	(French Football Federation) Dijon
22	MF	Alex Jankewitz	25 December 2001 (aged 19)	6	0	(The Football Association) Southampton
23	DF	**Jordan Lotomba**	29 September 1998 (aged 22)	11	1	(French Football Federation) Nice

== Knockout stage ==
Age, caps, goals and club as of 31 May 2021.

=== Croatia ===
Head coach: Igor Bišćan

The squad was announced on 17 May 2021. On 25 May, Luka Sučić, Dario Vizinger and Mihael Žaper withdrew and were replaced by Neven Đurasek, Sandro Kulenović and Matej Vuk.

No.	Pos.	Player	Date of birth (age)	Caps	Goals	Club
1	GK	Adrian Šemper	12 January 1998 (aged 23)	12	0	(Italian Football Federation) Chievo
2	DF	Marin Šverko	4 February 1998 (aged 23)	11	1	(German Football Association) 1. FC Saarbrücken
3	DF	David Čolina	19 July 2000 (aged 20)	6	0	(Croatian Football Federation) Hajduk Split
4	DF	Boško Šutalo	1 January 2000 (aged 21)	10	1	(Italian Football Federation) Atalanta
5	DF	**Martin Erlić**	24 January 1998 (aged 23)	6	0	(Italian Football Federation) Spezia
6	DF	**Joško Gvardiol**	23 January 2002 (aged 19)	5	1	(Croatian Football Federation) Dinamo Zagreb
7	MF	**Luka Ivanušec**	26 November 1998 (aged 22)	27	9	(Croatian Football Federation) Dinamo Zagreb
8	MF	**Nikola Moro**	12 March 1998 (aged 23)	23	6	(Russian Football Union) Dynamo Moscow
9	FW	Sandro Kulenović	4 December 1999 (aged 21)	15	6	(Croatian Football Federation) Rijeka
10	MF	**Lovro Majer**	17 January 1998 (aged 23)	18	5	(Croatian Football Federation) Dinamo Zagreb
11	DF	**Domagoj Bradarić**	10 December 1999 (aged 21)	13	1	(French Football Federation) Lille
12	GK	Ivor Pandur	25 March 2000 (aged 21)	0	0	(Italian Football Federation) Hellas Verona
13	MF	Neven Đurasek	15 August 1998 (aged 22)	4	1	(Croatian Football Federation) Varaždin
14	MF	Hrvoje Babec	28 July 1999 (aged 21)	3	0	(Croatian Football Federation) Gorica
15	DF	Krešimir Krizmanić	3 July 2000 (aged 20)	3	0	(Croatian Football Federation) Gorica
16	DF	Bartol Franjić	14 January 2000 (aged 21)	4	0	(Croatian Football Federation) Dinamo Zagreb
17	MF	Kristijan Bistrović	9 April 1998 (aged 23)	17	4	(Turkish Football Federation) Kasımpaşa
18	FW	Stipe Biuk	26 December 2002 (aged 18)	0	0	(Croatian Football Federation) Hajduk Split
19	FW	Matej Vuk	10 June 2000 (aged 20)	1	0	(Croatian Football Federation) Istra 1961
20	FW	**Petar Musa**	4 March 1998 (aged 23)	10	4	(German Football Association) Union Berlin
21	FW	Dario Špikić	22 March 1999 (aged 22)	9	2	(Croatian Football Federation) Gorica
22	DF	Mario Vušković	16 November 2001 (aged 19)	5	0	(Croatian Football Federation) Hajduk Split
23	GK	Ivan Nevistić	31 July 1998 (aged 22)	1	0	(Croatian Football Federation) Rijeka

=== Denmark ===
Head coach: (Spain) Albert Capellas

The squad was announced on 21 May 2021. On 28 May, Mads Bech Sørensen withdrew injured and was replaced by Simon Graves Jensen.

No.	Pos.	Player	Date of birth (age)	Caps	Goals	Club
1	GK	**Oliver Christensen**	22 March 1999 (aged 22)	13	0	(Danish Football Association) OB
2	DF	**Mads Roerslev**	24 June 1999 (aged 21)	6	0	(The Football Association) Brentford
3	DF	Andreas Poulsen	13 October 1999 (aged 21)	16	1	(Austrian Football Association) Austria Wien
4	DF	Simon Graves Jensen	22 May 1999 (aged 22)	0	0	(Danish Football Association) Randers
5	DF	**Victor Nelsson**	14 October 1998 (aged 22)	33	1	(Danish Football Association) Copenhagen
6	MF	**Nikolas Nartey**	22 February 2000 (aged 21)	12	1	(German Football Association) SV Sandhausen
7	FW	Nikolai Laursen	19 February 1998 (aged 23)	10	5	(Royal Dutch Football Association) Emmen
8	MF	**Jesper Lindstrøm**	29 February 2000 (aged 21)	6	2	(Danish Football Association) Brøndby
9	FW	Nikolai Baden	18 May 2000 (aged 21)	2	0	(Austrian Football Association) WSG Tirol
10	FW	**Jacob Bruun Larsen**	19 September 1998 (aged 22)	27	7	(Royal Belgian Football Association) Anderlecht
11	FW	**Anders Dreyer**	2 May 1998 (aged 23)	19	2	(Danish Football Association) Midtjylland
12	DF	Sebastian Hausner	11 April 2000 (aged 21)	2	0	(Danish Football Association) AGF
13	DF	Frederik Alves	8 November 1999 (aged 21)	6	0	(The Football Association) West Ham United
14	MF	**Morten Hjulmand**	25 June 1999 (aged 21)	9	0	(Italian Football Federation) Lecce
15	DF	Rasmus Carstensen	1 January 2000 (aged 21)	6	0	(Danish Football Association) Silkeborg
16	GK	Peter Vindahl	16 February 1998 (aged 23)	3	0	(Danish Football Association) Nordsjælland
17	FW	**Mohamed Daramy**	7 January 2002 (aged 19)	5	0	(Danish Football Association) Copenhagen
18	DF	**Victor Kristiansen**	16 December 2002 (aged 18)	0	0	(Danish Football Association) Copenhagen
19	FW	**Gustav Isaksen**	19 April 2001 (aged 20)	7	1	(Danish Football Association) Midtjylland
20	MF	Magnus Kofod Andersen	10 May 1999 (aged 22)	23	0	(Danish Football Association) Nordsjælland
21	FW	Carlo Holse	2 June 1999 (aged 21)	16	2	(Norwegian Football Federation) Rosenborg
22	GK	**Mads Hermansen**	11 July 2000 (aged 20)	0	0	(Danish Football Association) Brøndby
23	FW	Wahid Faghir	29 July 2003 (aged 17)	1	0	(Danish Football Association) Vejle

=== France ===
Head coach: Sylvain Ripoll

The squad was announced on 20 May 2021. On 24 May, Randal Kolo Muani and Alban Lafont withdrew due to club obligations, while Wesley Fofana withdrew injured, and were replaced by Axel Disasi, Etienne Green and Arnaud Kalimuendo. On 26 May, Adrien Truffert withdrew injured and was replaced by Nicolas Cozza.

No.	Pos.	Player	Date of birth (age)	Caps	Goals	Club
1	GK	Etienne Green	19 July 2000 (aged 20)	0	0	(French Football Federation) Saint-Étienne
2	DF	**Pierre Kalulu**	5 June 2000 (aged 20)	0	0	(Italian Football Federation) Milan
3	DF	**Axel Disasi**	11 March 1998 (aged 23)	0	0	(French Football Federation) Monaco
4	DF	**Dayot Upamecano**	27 October 1998 (aged 22)	15	0	(German Football Association) RB Leipzig
5	DF	**Benoît Badiashile**	26 March 2001 (aged 20)	6	0	(French Football Federation) Monaco
6	DF	**Ibrahima Konaté**	25 May 1999 (aged 22)	12	0	(German Football Association) RB Leipzig
7	DF	Nicolas Cozza	8 January 1999 (aged 22)	6	0	(French Football Federation) Montpellier
8	MF	**Houssem Aouar**	30 June 1998 (aged 22)	16	4	(French Football Federation) Lyon
9	FW	**Amine Gouiri**	16 February 2000 (aged 21)	11	4	(French Football Federation) Nice
10	MF	Maxence Caqueret	15 February 2000 (aged 21)	4	0	(French Football Federation) Lyon
11	FW	**Jonathan Ikoné**	2 May 1998 (aged 23)	17	4	(French Football Federation) Lille
12	MF	**Youssouf Fofana**	10 January 1999 (aged 22)	1	0	(French Football Federation) Monaco
13	DF	Colin Dagba	9 September 1998 (aged 22)	15	1	(French Football Federation) Paris Saint-Germain
14	MF	**Aurélien Tchouaméni**	27 January 2000 (aged 21)	3	0	(French Football Federation) Monaco
15	MF	Romain Faivre	14 July 1998 (aged 22)	7	2	(French Football Federation) Brest
16	GK	**Dimitry Bertaud**	6 June 1998 (aged 22)	1	0	(French Football Federation) Montpellier
17	MF	**Eduardo Camavinga**	10 November 2002 (aged 18)	4	0	(French Football Federation) Rennes
18	FW	Arnaud Kalimuendo	20 January 2002 (aged 19)	1	0	(French Football Federation) Lens
19	FW	**Moussa Diaby**	7 July 1999 (aged 21)	11	0	(German Football Association) Bayer Leverkusen
20	MF	Boubakary Soumaré	27 February 1999 (aged 22)	13	0	(French Football Federation) Lille
21	DF	Faitout Maouassa	6 July 1998 (aged 22)	5	0	(French Football Federation) Rennes
22	FW	Odsonne Édouard	16 January 1998 (aged 23)	13	17	(Scottish Football Association) Celtic
23	GK	Illan Meslier	2 March 2000 (aged 21)	0	0	(The Football Association) Leeds United

=== Germany ===
Head coach: Stefan Kuntz

The squad was announced on 24 May 2021. On 25 May, Maxim Leitsch withdrew injured and was replaced by Lars Lukas Mai. On 30 May, Janni Serra withdrew injured and was replaced by Shinta Appelkamp.

No.	Pos.	Player	Date of birth (age)	Caps	Goals	Club
1	GK	Markus Schubert	12 June 1998 (aged 22)	6	0	(German Football Association) Eintracht Frankfurt
2	DF	**Josha Vagnoman**	12 November 2000 (aged 20)	7	0	(German Football Association) Hamburger SV
3	DF	**David Raum**	22 April 1998 (aged 23)	5	0	(German Football Association) Greuther Fürth
4	DF	**Nico Schlotterbeck**	1 December 1999 (aged 21)	10	3	(German Football Association) Union Berlin
5	DF	Amos Pieper	17 January 1998 (aged 23)	7	0	(German Football Association) Arminia Bielefeld
6	MF	Niklas Dorsch	15 January 1998 (aged 23)	11	1	(Royal Belgian Football Association) Gent
7	MF	**Florian Wirtz**	3 May 2003 (aged 18)	3	0	(German Football Association) Bayer Leverkusen
8	MF	Arne Maier	8 January 1999 (aged 22)	15	1	(German Football Association) Hertha BSC
9	FW	**Jonathan Burkardt**	11 July 2000 (aged 20)	8	2	(German Football Association) Mainz 05
10	FW	**Lukas Nmecha**	14 December 1998 (aged 22)	17	10	(Royal Belgian Football Association) Anderlecht
11	FW	**Mërgim Berisha**	11 May 1998 (aged 23)	10	1	(Austrian Football Association) Red Bull Salzburg
12	GK	Finn Dahmen	27 March 1998 (aged 23)	5	0	(German Football Association) Mainz 05
13	MF	**Salih Özcan**	11 January 1998 (aged 23)	13	1	(German Football Association) 1. FC Köln
14	DF	Paul Jaeckel	22 July 1998 (aged 22)	1	0	(German Football Association) Greuther Fürth
15	DF	**Ismail Jakobs**	17 August 1999 (aged 21)	7	0	(German Football Association) 1. FC Köln
16	FW	Shinta Appelkamp	1 November 2000 (aged 20)	0	0	(German Football Association) Fortuna Düsseldorf
17	MF	**Anton Stach**	15 November 1998 (aged 22)	2	0	(German Football Association) Greuther Fürth
18	DF	**Karim Adeyemi**	18 January 2002 (aged 19)	0	0	(Austrian Football Association) Red Bull Salzburg
19	DF	Lars Lukas Mai	31 March 2000 (aged 21)	4	0	(German Football Association) Darmstadt 98
20	MF	Vitaly Janelt	10 May 1998 (aged 23)	8	0	(The Football Association) Brentford
21	DF	**Ridle Baku**	8 April 1998 (aged 23)	11	2	(German Football Association) VfL Wolfsburg
22	MF	Mateo Klimowicz	6 July 2000 (aged 20)	3	0	(German Football Association) VfB Stuttgart
23	GK	Lennart Grill	12 June 1998 (aged 22)	7	0	(German Football Association) Bayer Leverkusen

=== Italy ===
Head coach: Paolo Nicolato

The squad was announced on 24 May 2021.

No.	Pos.	Player	Date of birth (age)	Caps	Goals	Club
1	GK	Alessandro Plizzari	12 March 2000 (aged 21)	2	0	(Italian Football Federation) Reggina
2	DF	**Raoul Bellanova**	17 May 2000 (aged 21)	6	0	(Italian Football Federation) Pescara
3	DF	Pietro Beruatto	21 December 1998 (aged 22)	0	0	(Italian Football Federation) Vicenza
4	MF	**Samuele Ricci**	21 August 2001 (aged 19)	3	0	(Italian Football Federation) Empoli
5	DF	Alessandro Vogliacco	14 September 1998 (aged 22)	3	0	(Italian Football Federation) Pordenone
6	DF	Matteo Lovato	14 February 2000 (aged 21)	3	0	(Italian Football Federation) Hellas Verona
7	MF	**Davide Frattesi**	22 September 1999 (aged 21)	9	2	(Italian Football Federation) Monza
8	MF	**Youssef Maleh**	22 August 1998 (aged 22)	5	1	(Italian Football Federation) Venezia
9	FW	**Andrea Pinamonti**	19 May 1999 (aged 22)	9	2	(Italian Football Federation) Internazionale
10	FW	**Patrick Cutrone**	3 January 1998 (aged 23)	24	10	(Royal Spanish Football Federation) Valencia
11	FW	**Gianluca Scamacca**	1 January 1999 (aged 22)	14	8	(Italian Football Federation) Genoa
12	GK	Marco Carnesecchi	1 July 2000 (aged 20)	11	0	(Italian Football Federation) Cremonese
13	DF	**Luca Ranieri**	23 April 1999 (aged 22)	7	0	(Italian Football Federation) SPAL
14	MF	**Nicolò Rovella**	4 December 2001 (aged 19)	4	0	(Italian Football Federation) Genoa
15	DF	Enrico Del Prato	10 November 1999 (aged 21)	11	1	(Italian Football Federation) Reggina
16	DF	Lorenzo Pirola	20 February 2002 (aged 19)	2	0	(Italian Football Federation) Monza
17	DF	Gabriele Zappa	22 December 1999 (aged 21)	3	0	(Italian Football Federation) Cagliari
18	MF	**Tommaso Pobega**	15 July 1999 (aged 21)	5	2	(Italian Football Federation) Spezia
19	DF	Marco Sala	4 June 1999 (aged 21)	11	0	(Italian Football Federation) SPAL
20	FW	**Giacomo Raspadori**	18 February 2000 (aged 21)	7	3	(Italian Football Federation) Sassuolo
21	MF	Giulio Maggiore	12 March 1998 (aged 23)	7	1	(Italian Football Federation) Spezia
22	GK	Michele Cerofolini	4 January 1999 (aged 22)	2	0	(Italian Football Federation) Reggiana
23	FW	Riccardo Sottil	3 June 1999 (aged 21)	11	3	(Italian Football Federation) Cagliari

=== Netherlands ===
Head coach: Erwin van de Looi

The squad was announced on 21 May 2021. On 24 May, Noa Lang and Deyovaisio Zeefuik withdrew injured, while Ludovit Reis withdrew due to club obligations, and were replaced by Mats Knoester and Kaj Sierhuis (thus reducing the squad to 22 players). On 26 May, Brian Brobbey withdrew injured and no replacement was added (thus reducing the squad to 21 players), though he was still included in the official squad list with the number 19 shirt.

No.	Pos.	Player	Date of birth (age)	Caps	Goals	Club
1	GK	**Justin Bijlow**	22 January 1998 (aged 23)	11	0	(Royal Dutch Football Association) Feyenoord
2	DF	**Jordan Teze**	30 September 1999 (aged 21)	8	0	(Royal Dutch Football Association) PSV Eindhoven
3	DF	Perr Schuurs	26 November 1999 (aged 21)	15	1	(Royal Dutch Football Association) Ajax
4	DF	Sven Botman	12 January 2000 (aged 21)	5	1	(French Football Federation) Lille
5	DF	Mitchel Bakker	20 June 2000 (aged 20)	9	0	(French Football Federation) Paris Saint-Germain
6	MF	**Ferdi Kadıoğlu**	7 October 1999 (aged 21)	16	1	(Turkish Football Federation) Fenerbahçe
7	FW	**Justin Kluivert**	5 May 1999 (aged 22)	18	5	(German Football Association) RB Leipzig
8	MF	Abdou Harroui	13 January 1998 (aged 23)	11	1	(Royal Dutch Football Association) Sparta Rotterdam
9	FW	**Myron Boadu**	14 January 2001 (aged 20)	10	9	(Royal Dutch Football Association) AZ
10	MF	Dani de Wit	28 January 1998 (aged 23)	15	11	(Royal Dutch Football Association) AZ
11	FW	**Calvin Stengs**	18 December 1998 (aged 22)	5	3	(Royal Dutch Football Association) AZ
12	FW	Mats Knoester	19 November 1998 (aged 22)	0	0	(Royal Dutch Football Association) Heracles Almelo
13	DF	Danilho Doekhi	30 June 1998 (aged 22)	5	0	(Royal Dutch Football Association) Vitesse
14	DF	**Devyne Rensch**	18 January 2003 (aged 18)	0	0	(Royal Dutch Football Association) Ajax
15	DF	**Tyrell Malacia**	17 August 1999 (aged 21)	5	0	(Royal Dutch Football Association) Feyenoord
16	GK	Kjell Scherpen	23 January 2000 (aged 21)	8	0	(Royal Dutch Football Association) Ajax
17	MF	Jurgen Ekkelenkamp	5 April 2000 (aged 21)	5	3	(Royal Dutch Football Association) Ajax
18	MF	Azor Matusiwa	28 April 1998 (aged 23)	2	0	(Royal Dutch Football Association) Groningen
19	FW	**Brian Brobbey**	1 February 2002 (aged 19)	0	0	(Royal Dutch Football Association) Ajax
20	FW	Kaj Sierhuis	27 April 1998 (aged 23)	12	9	(French Football Federation) Reims
21	FW	**Javairô Dilrosun**	22 June 1998 (aged 22)	11	2	(German Football Association) Hertha BSC
23	GK	**Maarten Paes**	14 May 1998 (aged 23)	6	0	(Royal Dutch Football Association) Utrecht

=== Portugal ===
Head coach: Rui Jorge

The squad was announced on 21 May 2021. On 24 May, Thierry Correia withdrew due to a positive COVID-19 test, while Francisco Trincão withdrew due to quarantine as a close contact, and were replaced by Abdu Conté and Filipe Soares.

No.	Pos.	Player	Date of birth (age)	Caps	Goals	Club
1	GK	**Diogo Costa**	19 September 1999 (aged 21)	13	0	(Portuguese Football Federation) Porto
2	DF	Abdu Conté	24 March 1998 (aged 23)	0	0	(Portuguese Football Federation) Moreirense
3	DF	Diogo Leite	23 January 1999 (aged 22)	19	2	(Portuguese Football Federation) Porto
4	DF	Diogo Queirós	5 January 1999 (aged 22)	13	4	(Portuguese Football Federation) Famalicão
5	DF	**Diogo Dalot**	15 March 1999 (aged 22)	12	0	(Italian Football Federation) Milan
6	MF	Florentino Luís	19 August 1999 (aged 21)	9	0	(French Football Federation) Monaco
7	MF	**Vitinha**	13 February 2000 (aged 21)	14	1	(The Football Association) Wolverhampton Wanderers
8	MF	**Gedson Fernandes**	9 January 1999 (aged 22)	14	2	(Turkish Football Federation) Galatasaray
9	FW	**Rafael Leão**	10 June 1999 (aged 21)	12	1	(Italian Football Federation) Milan
10	MF	Daniel Bragança	27 May 1999 (aged 22)	10	0	(Portuguese Football Federation) Sporting CP
11	FW	Dany Mota	2 May 1998 (aged 23)	13	5	(Italian Football Federation) Monza
12	GK	Luís Maximiano	5 January 1999 (aged 22)	2	0	(Portuguese Football Federation) Sporting CP
13	DF	Tomás Tavares	7 March 2001 (aged 20)	5	0	(Portuguese Football Federation) Farense
14	DF	Pedro Pereira	22 January 1998 (aged 23)	4	0	(Italian Football Federation) Crotone
15	DF	**Tiago Djaló**	9 April 2000 (aged 21)	3	0	(French Football Federation) Lille
16	MF	Romário Baró	25 January 2000 (aged 21)	1	0	(Portuguese Football Federation) Porto
17	MF	Filipe Soares	20 May 1999 (aged 22)	3	0	(Portuguese Football Federation) Moreirense
18	FW	**Gonçalo Ramos**	20 June 2001 (aged 19)	6	1	(Portuguese Football Federation) Benfica
19	FW	Tiago Tomás	16 June 2002 (aged 18)	2	0	(Portuguese Football Federation) Sporting CP
20	FW	Jota	30 March 1999 (aged 22)	15	4	(Royal Spanish Football Federation) Valladolid
21	FW	**Francisco Conceição**	14 December 2002 (aged 18)	3	1	(Portuguese Football Federation) Porto
22	GK	João Virgínia	10 October 1999 (aged 21)	2	0	(The Football Association) Everton
23	MF	Fábio Vieira	30 May 2000 (aged 21)	10	6	(Portuguese Football Federation) Porto

=== Spain ===
Head coach: Luis de la Fuente

The squad was announced on 21 May 2021. On 26 May, Jon Moncayola withdrew injured and was replaced by Antonio Blanco.

No.	Pos.	Player	Date of birth (age)	Caps	Goals	Club
1	GK	**Álvaro Fernández**	13 April 1998 (aged 23)	8	0	(Royal Spanish Football Federation) Huesca
2	DF	**Óscar Mingueza**	13 May 1999 (aged 22)	1	0	(Royal Spanish Football Federation) Barcelona B
3	DF	Adrià Pedrosa	13 May 1998 (aged 23)	8	2	(Royal Spanish Football Federation) Espanyol
4	DF	**Hugo Guillamón**	31 January 2000 (aged 21)	7	1	(Royal Spanish Football Federation) Valencia
5	DF	Jorge Cuenca	17 November 1999 (aged 21)	10	0	(Royal Spanish Football Federation) Almería
6	MF	**Martín Zubimendi**	2 February 1999 (aged 22)	5	0	(Royal Spanish Football Federation) Real Sociedad
7	FW	**Brahim Díaz**	3 August 1999 (aged 21)	6	2	(Italian Football Federation) Milan
8	MF	**Fran Beltrán**	3 February 1999 (aged 22)	13	0	(Royal Spanish Football Federation) Celta Vigo
9	FW	**Abel Ruiz**	28 January 2000 (aged 21)	6	0	(Portuguese Football Federation) Braga
10	MF	**Gonzalo Villar**	23 March 1998 (aged 23)	8	1	(Italian Football Federation) Roma
11	MF	**Marc Cucurella**	22 July 1998 (aged 22)	9	1	(Royal Spanish Football Federation) Getafe
12	DF	**Juan Miranda**	19 January 2000 (aged 21)	5	1	(Royal Spanish Football Federation) Real Betis
13	GK	**Josep Martínez**	27 May 1998 (aged 23)	3	0	(German Football Association) RB Leipzig
14	MF	**Manu García**	2 January 1998 (aged 23)	8	2	(Royal Spanish Football Federation) Sporting Gijón
15	DF	Alejandro Francés	1 August 2002 (aged 18)	0	0	(Royal Spanish Football Federation) Zaragoza
16	MF	**Antonio Blanco**	13 May 1998 (aged 23)	0	0	(Royal Spanish Football Federation) Real Madrid B
17	FW	**Bryan Gil**	11 February 2001 (aged 20)	3	0	(Royal Spanish Football Federation) Eibar
18	FW	**Javi Puado**	25 May 1998 (aged 23)	8	1	(Royal Spanish Football Federation) Espanyol
19	FW	Fer Niño	24 October 2000 (aged 20)	0	0	(Royal Spanish Football Federation) Villarreal
20	FW	**Yeremy Pino**	20 October 2002 (aged 18)	2	0	(Royal Spanish Football Federation) Villarreal
21	MF	**Oihan Sancet**	25 April 2000 (aged 21)	0	0	(Royal Spanish Football Federation) Athletic Bilbao
22	DF	**Óscar Gil**	26 April 1998 (aged 23)	0	0	(Royal Spanish Football Federation) Espanyol
23	GK	Iñaki Peña	2 March 1999 (aged 22)	1	0	(Royal Spanish Football Federation) Barcelona B
