= Harvard University Polo Club =

- Founded: 1883
- Association: United States Polo Association
- Location: Cambridge, Massachusetts
- Colours: Harvard Crimson

The Harvard University Polo Club (also known as the Harvard Polo Club) is the intercollegiate polo program of Harvard University in Cambridge, Massachusetts. Founded in 1883, it is among the oldest collegiate polo organizations in the United States. The club has undergone several cycles of dormancy and revival, and since 2006 has operated continuously, fielding men’s and women’s teams and competing in national and international university-level polo competitions.

== History ==
=== Origins (1883–1900s) ===
Polo was introduced at Harvard in 1883 when a group of undergraduates began playing during summer months in Newport, Rhode Island, and later leased a field and stables in Watertown, Massachusetts. A regulation-size grass field was prepared in 1884 along the Cambridge–Watertown Highway.

In 1885, Harvard won the Newport Championship Cups, defeating the Westchester Polo Club and Meadow Brook Polo Club — the first major tournament victory for a U.S. college team.

=== Intercollegiate competition and early championships ===
As collegiate polo grew, Harvard became a founding member of the Intercollegiate Polo Association (IPA) in 1925. Throughout the 1920s and 1930s, Harvard won multiple intercollegiate championships, including titles in 1925, 1929, and several years during the 1930s.

=== Mid-20th century fluctuations ===
In the mid-20th century, as polo’s popularity and institutional support waned nationally, Harvard’s program experienced periods of inactivity and diminished institutional backing. A revival took place in 1969, supported by the Myopia Hunt Club which provided ponies and practice grounds. Further reorganization efforts occurred through the 1980s.

== Modern history (2000s–present) ==
In 2006 the Harvard Polo Club was revived once more, re-establishing a stable program with men’s and women’s teams under the guidance of coaches and renewed student and alumni interest.

Throughout the 2010s the club consolidated its training base at the Myopia Hunt Club and a dedicated equestrian facility in South Hamilton, Massachusetts, supported by alumni funding and institutional backing.

The club has frequently participated in intercollegiate and exhibition matches, and has worked to raise the profile of collegiate polo through visible events and outreach.

== Atlantic Cup ==
The Atlantic Cup is an annual international university-polo tournament contested by four major university clubs: Oxford University Polo Club, Cambridge University Polo Club, Harvard, and Yale Polo Club. The tournament was inaugurated in 2002 when Yale challenged Oxford and Cambridge; Harvard joined the competition later, expanding the event to a four-way trans-Atlantic contest.

In the 2018 edition — the first Atlantic Cup hosted by Harvard at the Myopia Hunt Club — Harvard finished second overall, behind Oxford. The tournament spanned several days and featured round-robin matches among the four universities.

The Atlantic Cup remains one of the few recurring international university-level polo competitions, offering regular transatlantic competition between leading US and UK university clubs.

== Harvard–Yale Polo Rivalry ==
The varsity polo rivalry between Harvard and Yale is part of the broader historic intercollegiate rivalry between the two universities. The rivalry has been expressed through exhibition and competitive matches in the modern era. For instance, in 2017 Harvard defeated Yale at the inaugural beach-polo event known as the Ocean House Beach Polo Classic in Watch Hill, Rhode Island.

In addition, the clubs have periodically organized alumni matches and charity events. In 2002, the first “Harvard-Yale Polo Cup” was held at the Greenwich Polo Club, pitting alumni from both universities in a charity-fundraiser format, raising money for medical research and supporting the clubs’ programs.

While the rivalry in polo does not have a single longstanding trophy equivalent to “The Game” in football or the rowing regatta, these matches reflect the broader competitive tradition between Harvard and Yale, and contribute to the preservation and visibility of collegiate polo in the United States.

== Teams and Competition ==
Harvard currently fields men’s, women’s, and junior varsity teams competing under the aegis of the United States Polo Association (USPA) Intercollegiate Division. The club’s regular opposition includes Yale, Cornell, Skidmore, the University of Connecticut, and other northeastern institutions.

== Facilities ==
The club trains at a dedicated equestrian facility in South Hamilton, Massachusetts, as well as at Myopia Hunt Club in Hamilton/South Hamilton. The facilities include indoor and outdoor arenas, stables, paddocks, and riding grounds.

== See also ==
- United States Polo Association
- Intercollegiate Polo Association
- Myopia Hunt Club
- Ocean House Beach Polo Classic
- Atlantic Cup
