= 2012 Leiknir R. season =

Leiknir
2011–12 season
- Manager: Willum Þór Þórsson (until 4 March 2012); Gunnar Einarsson (caretaker)
- 1. deild karla: 10th
- Icelandic Cup: Round of 32
- League Cup: Group Stage
- Reykjavik Cup: Group Stage
- Top goalscorer: League: Ólafur Hrannar Kristjánsson (9); All: Ólafur Hrannar Kristjánsson (13)
Home colours	Away colours

The 2012 season was the club's 39th year since its establishment and its 7th consecutive season in the 1st division. The team was predicted to finish in 4th place before the season; after a difficult season the team ended up in 10th place, narrowly avoiding relegation by a win in the last round.

Willum Þór Þórsson was appointed manager at the start of the season, but his association with the club would be broken off in July after a disappointing season. Gunnar Einarsson former assistant manager was appointed interim manager until the end of the season along with Davíð Snorri Jónasson as his assistant.

== Squad ==
=== First team squad ===
Note: Flags indicate national team as defined under FIFA eligibility rules; some limited exceptions apply. Players may hold more than one non-FIFA nationality.

No.	Pos.	Nation	Player
1	GK	ISL	Þorvaldur Rúnarsson
2	DF	ISL	Stefán Jóhann Eggertsson
4	DF	ISL	Damir Muminovic
5	FW	ISL	Gunnar Wigelund
6	FW	ISL	Ólafur Hrannar Kristjánsson
7	FW	ISL	Brynjar Benediktsson
8	MF	ISL	Andri Steinn Birgisson
9	MF	ISL	Birkir Björnsson
10	MF	ISL	Fannar Þór Arnarsson
11	MF	ISL	Brynjar Hlöðversson
14	FW	ISL	Kjartan Andri Baldvinsson
15	MF	ISL	Kristján Páll Jónsson

No.	Pos.	Nation	Player
16	MF	ISL	Sindri Björnsson
17	MF	ISL	Aron Daníelsson
18	FW	USA	Samuel Petrone
20	DF	ISL	Óttar Bjarni Guðmundsson
21	MF	ISL	Hilmar Árni Halldórsson
22	GK	ISL	Eyjólfur Tómasson
23	DF	ISL	Gunnar Einarsson
24	MF	ISL	Vigfús Arnar Jósepsson
26	MF	ISL	Zlatko Krickic
27	DF	ISL	Pétur Már Harðarson
-	GK	ISL	Ásgeir Þór Magnússon

Source : 1st Division squad 2012

== Transfers ==
=== Players In ===
Date.	Pos.	Name	From	Source
25 October 2011	MF	(Iceland) Andri Steinn Birgisson	(Iceland) Keflavík	
30 October 2011	DF	(Iceland) Damir Muminovic	(Iceland) HK	
1 November 2011	DF	(Iceland) Stefán Jóhann Eggertsson	(Iceland) Valur	
19 November 2011	DF	(Iceland) Gunnar Einarsson	(Iceland) Víkingur R.	
10 January 2012	DF	(Iceland) Pétur Már Harðarson	(Iceland) Grótta	
24 February 2012	MF	(Iceland) Gísli Freyr Brynjarsson	(Iceland) Kári	
12 May 2012	MF	(Iceland) Zlatko Krickic	(Iceland) HK	

=== Players Out ===
Pos.	Name	To
DF	(Iceland) Brynjar Óli Guðmundsson	(Iceland) KB
DF	(Iceland) Eggert Rafn Einarsson	(Iceland) KV
FW	(Iceland) Pape Mamadou Faye	(Iceland) Grindavík
DF	(Iceland) Steinarr Guðmundsson	(Iceland) KB
MF	(Iceland) Þórir Guðjónsson(Returning from Loan)	(Iceland) Valur

=== Loans in ===
Date.	Pos.	Name	From	Source
24 March 2012	FW	(Iceland) Jóhann Andri Kristjánsson	(Iceland) Fylkir	
12 May 2012	FW	(Iceland) Brynjar Benediktsson	(Iceland) FH	
20 July 2012	GK	(Iceland) Ásgeir Þór Magnússon	(Iceland) Valur	
26 July 2012	FW	(United States) Samuel Petrone	(Sweden) Mjällby AIF	

=== Loans Out ===
Date.	Pos.	Name	To	Source
24 July 2012	GK	(Iceland) Eyjólfur Tómasson	(Iceland) Valur	

== Pre-season ==
Leiknir started the pre-season with a couple of impressive results in Reykjavik Cup against rather strong teams. In their first match Leiknir defeated Víkingur R. 2–1. Leiknir followed that win by defeating their rivals ÍR 3–0. Next game they lost 6–3 to KR in an exciting match. Their last match against Fram finished 1–1 leaving Leiknir in 3rd place in their group, level on points with KR but with a weaker goal difference and therefore not qualifying from the group. Fram went on to win the cup. Leiknir finished 5th in their group in the League Cup.

== Reykjavik Cup ==
=== Matches ===
12 January 2012 1	Víkingur R.	1–2	Leiknir R.	Reykjavík
19:00 GMT	Kjartan Dige Baldursson 18'	Report	14' Kristján Páll Jónsson; 55' Hilmar Árni Halldórsson; (yellow card) 87' Óttar Bjarni Guðmundsson	Stadium: Egilshöll; Attendance: - Referee: Halldór Breiðfjörð Jóhannsson

25 January 2012 2	Leiknir R.	3–0	ÍR	Reykjavík
19:00 GMT	Goal	Report		Stadium: Egilshöll; Attendance: - Referee: Pétur Guðmundsson

29 January 2012 4	KR	6–3	Leiknir R.	Reykjavík
18:00 GMT	Dofri Snorrason 11,32'; Kjartan Henry Finnbogason 14,60'; Viktor Bjarki Arnarsson (yellow card) 40'; Aron Bjarki Jósepsson (yellow card) 43' (goal) 48'; Haukur Heiðar Hauksson (yellow card) 70'; Óli Pétur Friðþjóðfsson 89'	Report	6,44' Ólafur Hrannar Kristjánsson; 25' Kristján Andri Baldvinsson; (yellow card) 48' (red card) 90' Willum Þór Þórsson; (yellow card) 55' Stefán Jóhann Eggertsson	Stadium: Egilshöll; Attendance: - Referee: Garðar Örn Hinriksson

4 February 2012 5	Leiknir R.	1–1	Fram	Reykjavík
15:00 GMT	Vigfús Arnar Jósepsson 40'; Ólafur Hrannar Kristjánsson (yellow card) 45'; Sigurður H Hallvarðsson (red card) 45'; Óttar Bjarni Guðmundsson (yellow card) 69'	Report	7' (pen.) Samuel Hewson; (yellow card) 55' Hlynur Atli Magnússon; (yellow card) 77' Gunnar Oddgeir Birgisson; (red card) 88' Almarr Ormarsson; (yellow card) 90' Jón Orri Ólafsson	Stadium: Egilshöll; Attendance: - Referee: Valgeir Valgeirsson

== League Cup ==
=== Table ===
Pos	Team	Pld	W	D	L	GF	GA	GD	Pts	Qualification
1	Valur (Q)	7	6	1	0	24	4	+20	19	Qualification to the Quarter-finals
2	FH (Q)	7	4	2	1	15	7	+8	14	Qualification to the Quarter-finals
3	Þór A. (Q)	7	4	1	2	11	8	+3	13	Qualification to the Quarter-finals
4	Grindavík	7	2	3	2	10	11	−1	9	
5	Leiknir R.	7	2	2	3	11	17	−6	8	
6	Fylkir	7	2	1	4	11	14	−3	7	
7	Fjölnir	7	1	2	4	10	14	−4	5	
8	Höttur	7	1	0	6	13	30	−17	3	

Source: ksi.is (in Icelandic)
Rules for classification: 1) points; 2) goal difference; 3) number of goals scored.
(Q) Qualified for the phase indicated

=== Matches ===
17 February 2012 1	Fjölnir	1–1	Leiknir R.	Reykjavík
21:00 GMT	Illugi Þór Gunnarsson 52'	Report	(yellow card) 58' Aron Daníelsson; 86' Óttar Bjarni Guðmundsson; (yellow card) 86' Ólafur Hrannar Kristjánsson	Stadium: Egilshöll; Attendance: - Referee: Vilhjálmur Alvar Þórarinsson

24 February 2012 2	Leiknir R.	1–1	Grindavík	Reykjavík
19:00 GMT	Andri Steinn Birgisson 34'; Óttar Bjarni Guðmundsson (yellow card) 57'	Report	16' Oluwatomiwo Ameobi; (yellow card) 59' Alexander Magnússon; (yellow card) 71' Oluwatomiwo Ameobi; (yellow card) 89' Alex Freyr Hilmarsson	Stadium: Egilshöll; Attendance: - Referee: Leiknir Ágústsson

30 March 2012 3	Leiknir R.	6–5	Höttur	Reykjavík
19:00 GMT	Hilmar Árni Halldórsson 26'; Kristján Páll Jónsson 27'; Vigfús Arnar Jósepsson 38'; Kjartan Andri Baldvinsson (yellow card) 49'; Ólafur Hrannar Kristjánsson (yellow card) 57' (goal) 61'; Andri Steinn Birgisson 71,73' (pen.); Gunnar Einarsson (yellow card) 90'	Report	19,90' (pen.), 90' (pen.) Stefán Þór Eyjólfson; 21, 25' Elvar Þór Ægisson	Stadium: Egilshöll; Attendance: - Referee: Kristinn Jakobsson

15 March 2012 4	Leiknir R.	1–3	FH	Reykjavík
19:00 GMT	Ólafur Hrannar Kristjánsson 20' (yellow card) 52'; Brynjar Hlöðversson (yellow card) 54'; Óttar Bjarni Guðmunddson (yellow card) 72'	Report	22' Ólafur Páll Snorrason; (yellow card) 24' Ingimar Elí Hlynsson; 40' Hólmar Örn Rúnarsson; (yellow card) 51' Einar Karl Ingvarsson; 90' Atli Guðnason	Stadium: Egilshöll; Attendance: - Referee: Magnús Þórisson

25 March 2012 5	Þór	3–1	Leiknir R.	Kópavogur
17:30 GMT	Kristinn Þór Björnsson 10,49' (pen.); Sveinn Elías Jónsson 12'; Sigurður Marinó Kristjánsson (yellow card) 58'; Ingi Freyr Hilmarsson (yellow card) 80'	Report	(yellow card) 45' Birkir Björnsson; (yellow card) 56' Gunnar Einarsson; (yellow card) 62' Stefán Jóhann Eggertsson; 65' Hilmar Árni Halldórsson; (yellow card) 78' Óttar Bjarni Guðmundsson	Stadium: Boginn; Attendance: - Referee: Pétur Guðmundsson

4 April 2012 6	Fylkir	0–1	Leiknir R.	Reykjavík
20:00 GMT		Report	34' Kristján Páll Jónsson	Stadium: Fylkisvöllur; Attendance: - Referee: Kristinn Jakobsson

12 April 2012 7	Leiknir R.	0–4	Valur	Reykjavík
19:00 GMT	Kristján Páll Jónsson (yellow card) 30'; Óttar Bjarni Guðmundsson (yellow card) 33'	Report	34' Haukur Páll Sigurðsson; 38' Kristinn Freyr Sigurðsson; 65' Hörður Sveinsson; (yellow card) 65' Haukur Páll Sigurðsson; 69' Hafsteinn Briem	Stadium: Egilshöll; Attendance: - Referee: Þorvaldur Árnason

== 1st Division ==
=== League table ===
Pos	Team	Pld	W	D	L	GF	GA	GD	Pts	Promotion or relegation
8	Tindastóll	22	8	3	11	34	42	−8	27	
9	BÍ/Bolungarvík	22	6	8	8	31	37	−6	26	
10	Leiknir R.	22	6	7	9	33	36	−3	25	
11	Höttur (R)	22	5	6	11	30	41	−11	21	Relegation to the 2. deild karla
12	ÍR (R)	22	4	2	16	19	52	−33	14	Relegation to the 2. deild karla

Updated to match(es) played on 22 September 2012. Source: ksi.is (Icelandic)
Rules for classification: 1) points; 2) goal difference; 3) number of goals scored.
(R) Relegated

=== Results summary ===
Overall								Home						Away					
Pld	W	D	L	GF	GA	GD	Pts	W	D	L	GF	GA	GD	W	D	L	GF	GA	GD
22	6	7	9	33	36	−3	25	3	5	3	17	16	+1	3	2	6	16	20	−4

Last updated: 22 September 2012.
Source: ksi.is

=== Matches ===
12 May 2012 1	Þór	2–0	Leiknir R.	Akureyri
14:00 GMT	Ingi Freyr Hilmarsson (yellow card) 56'; Sigurður Marinó Kristjánsson 64'; Srdjan Rajkovic (yellow card) 73'; Jóhann Helgi Hannesson 85'	Report	(yellow card) 23' Hilmar Árni Halldórsson; (yellow card) 50' Vigfús Arnar Jósepsson; (yellow card) 73' Óttar Bjarni Guðmundsson	Stadium: Þórsvöllur; Attendance: 677; Referee: Erlendur Eiríksson

19 May 2012 2	Leiknir R.	1–3	KA	Reykjavík
14:00 GMT	Kjartan Andri Baldvinsson 10'; Óttar Bjarni Guðmundsson (yellow card) 55'	Report	29' Gunnar Valur Gunnarsson; 49' Jóhann Helgason; (yellow card) 50' Bjarki Baldvinsson; (yellow card) 83' Srdjan Tufegdzic; 90' Ævar Ingi Jóhannesson	Stadium: Leiknisvöllur; Attendance: - Referee: Garðar Örn Hinriksson

25 May 2012 3	Þróttur R.	3–1	Leiknir R.	Reykjavík
20:00 GMT	Andri Gíslason 30'; Vilhjálmur Pálmason 59'	Report	10,23' (yellow card) 41' Ólafur Hrannar Kristjánsson; (yellow card) 90' Aron Daníelsson	Stadium: Valbjarnarvöllur; Attendance: - Referee: Jan Eric Jessen

31 May 2012 4	Leiknir R.	0–0	Víkingur R.	Reykjavík
20:00 GMT	Fannar Þór Arnarsson (yellow card) 72'; Hilmar Árni Halldórsson (yellow card) 77'; Óttar Bjarni Guðmunddson (yellow card) 83'; Zlatko Krickic (yellow card) 90'	Report	(yellow card) 64' Halldór Smári Sigurðsson; (yellow card) 90' Aron Elís Þrándarson; (yellow card) 90' Sigurður Egill Lárusson; (yellow card) 90' Ólafur Þórðarson	Stadium: Leiknisvöllur; Attendance: - Referee: Þorvaldur Árnason

9 June 2012 5	Haukar	2–1	Leiknir R.	Hafnarfjörður
14:00 GMT	Gunnlaugur Fannar Guðmundsson 53'; Hilmar Trausti Arnarsson 61' (pen.); Enok Eiðsson (yellow card) 78'	Report	(yellow card) 52' Kristján Páll Jónsson; 90' (yellow card) 58' (yellow-red card) 90' Ólafur Hrannar Kristjánsson; (yellow card) 60' Óttar Bjarni Guðmundsson; (yellow card) 81' Zlatko Krickic; (yellow card) 84' Willum Þór Þórsson	Stadium: Schenkervöllurinn; Attendance: - Referee: Halldór Breiðfjörð Jóhannsson

15 June 2012 6	Leiknir R.	0–0	Fjölnir	Reykjavík
20:00 GMT	Stefán Jóhann Eggertsson (yellow card) 16'; Fannar Þór Arnarsson (yellow card) 76'	Report	(yellow card) 08' Guðmundur Karl Guðmundsson; (yellow card) 38' Þórir Guðjónsson; (yellow card) 73' Haukur Lárusson	Stadium: Leiknisvöllur; Attendance: - Referee: Pétur Guðmundsson

22 June 2012 7	Víkingur Ó.	0–1	Leiknir R.	Ólafsvík
20:00 GMT	Björn Pálsson (yellow card) 74'; Fannar Hilmarsson (yellow card) 87'; Tomasz Luba (yellow card) 90'; Guðmundur Steinn Hafsteinsson (yellow card) 90'	Report	45' Stefán Jóhann Eggertsson; (yellow card) 78' Zlatko Krickik; (yellow card) 90' Sindri Björnsson	Stadium: Ólafsvíkurvöllur; Attendance: 120; Referee: Leiknir Ágústsson

30 June 2012 8	Leiknir R.	1–1	Tindastóll	Reykjavík
14:00 GMT	Ólafur Hrannar Kristjánsson 41'; Brynjar Hlöðversson (yellow card) 78'; Willum Þór Þórsson (yellow card) 90' (yellow-red card) 90'; Davíð Snorri Jónasson (yellow card) 90'	Report	(yellow card) 52' Ingvi Hrannar Ómarsson; (yellow card) 59' Björn Anton Guðmundsson; (yellow card) 64' Fannar Örn Kolbeinsson; 90' Ben J. Everson	Stadium: Leiknisvöllur; Attendance: - Referee: Valgeir Valgeirsson

7 July 2012 9	BÍ/Bolungarvík	4–3	Leiknir R.	Ísafjörður
14:00 GMT	Haukur Ólafsson (yellow card) 9'; Andri Rúnar Bjarnason 23'; Gunnar Már Elíasson 25'; Pétur Georg Markan 38'; Dennis rasmussen Nielsen 78' (pen.) (yellow card) 57'; Daniel Osafo-Badu (yellow card) 59'; Jörundur Áki Sveinsson (yellow card) 69'; Sigþór Snorrason (yellow card) 86'	Report	(yellow card) 7' Hilmar Árni Halldórsson; 54' Fannar Þór Arnarsson; (yellow card) 54' Damir Muminovic; (yellow card) 54' Kristján Páll Jónsson; 59' Kjartan Andri Baldvinsson; (yellow card) 64' Óttar Bjarni Guðmundsson; 76' Gunnar Einarsson; (yellow card) 90' Brynjar Benediktsson	Stadium: Torfnesvöllur; Attendance: - Referee: Þórður Már Gylfason

13 July 2012 10	Leiknir R.	6–1	Höttur	Reykjavík
20:00 GMT	Kristján Páll Jónsson 12'; Ólafur Hrannar Kristjánsson 34,39,57'; Kjartan Andri Baldvinsson 44' (pen.); Óttar Bjarni Guðmundsson (yellow card) 75'; Fannar Þór Arnarsson 87'	Report	(red card) 43' Bjarni Viðar Hólmarsson; (red card) 57' Kristopher L. Byrd; 77' Óttar Steinn Magnússon; (yellow card) 88' Elmar Bragi Einarsson	Stadium: Leiknisvöllur; Attendance: - Referee: Valdimar Pálsson

17 July 2012 11	ÍR	2–1	Leiknir R.	Reykjavík
20:00 GMT	Jón Gísli Ström 41'; Guðmundur Gunnar Sveinsson 86'	Report	28' Pétur Már Harðarson; (yellow card) 71' Zlatko Krickic; (red card) 90' Eyjólfur Tómasson	Stadium: Hertz völlurinn Attendance: - Referee: Örvar Sær Gíslason

22 July 2012 12	Leiknir R.	1–5	Þór	Reykjavík
16:00 GMT	Damir Muminovic 15' (pen.); Brynjar Hlöðversson (red card) 70'	Report	(yellow card) 15' (goal) 64' Sveinn Elías Jónsson; 24' Janes Vrenko; 50' Jóhann Helgi Hannesson; 74' (pen.) Ármann Pétur Ævarsson; 85' Halldór Orri Hjaltason	Stadium: Leiknisvöllur; Attendance: - Referee: Valgeir Valgeirsson

27 July 2012 13	KA	1–2	Leiknir R.	Akureyri
18:30 GMT	Brian Gilmour (yellow card) 26'; Gunnar Örvar Stefánsson 83'; Gunnar Valur Gunnarsson (yellow card) 83'	Report	(yellow card) 44' (goal) 16' (pen.) Damir Muminovic; 49' Ólafur Hrannar Kristjánsson; (yellow card) 58' Gunnar Einarsson; (yellow card) 62' Fannar Þór Arnarsson; (yellow card) 90' Samuel Petrone	Stadium: Akureyrarvöllur; Attendance: 257; Referee: Sigurður Óli Þórleifsson

12 August 2012 14	Leiknir R.	1–2	Þróttur R.	Reykjavík
16:00 GMT	Kristján Páll Jónsson 18'; Gunnar Einarsson (yellow card) 48'; Stefán Jóhann Eggertsson (yellow card) 61'; Willum Þór Þórsson (yellow card) 63'	Report	9' Halldór Arnar Hilmisson; 48' (pen.) Helgi Pétur Magnússon; (yellow card) 53' Daniel Guðfinnur Þórir Ómarsson	Stadium: Leiknisvöllur; Attendance: – Referee: Gunnar Sverrir Gunnarsson

9 August 2012 15	Víkingur R.	1–1	Leiknir R.	Reykjavík
19:00 GMT	Sigurður Egill Lárusson 9' (yellow card) 36'; Ólafur Þórðarson (yellow card) 44'; Þorvaldur Sveinn Sveinsson (yellow card) 79'; Tómas Guðmundsson (yellow card) 90'	Report	26' Hilmar Árni Halldórsson; (yellow card) 45' Óttar Bjarni Guðmundsson; (yellow card) 72' Zlatko Krickic; (yellow card) 78' Damir Muminovic	Stadium: Víkingsvöllur; Attendance: - Referee: Vilhjálmur Alvar Þórarinsson

16 August 2012 16	Leiknir R.	2–2	Haukar	Reykjavík
19:00 GMT	Ólafur Hrannar Kristjánsson 42'; Stefán Jóhann Eggertsson (yellow card) 21'; Pétur Már Harðarson 86'	Report	23' (yellow card) 25' Árni Vilhjálmsson; 38' Gunnlaugur Fannar Guðmundsson; (yellow card) 76'Hilmar Trausti Arnarsson	Stadium: Leiknisvöllur; Attendance: 165; Referee: Valdimar Pálsson

21 August 2012 17	Fjölnir	2–1	Leiknir R.	Reykjavík
18:30 GMT	Haukur Lárusson 28'; Guðmundur Karl Guðmundsson 47'; Steinar Örn Gunnarsson (yellow card) 80'; Bergsveinn Ólafsson (yellow card) 83'	Report	9' Hilmar Árni Halldórsson; (yellow card) 29' Pétur Már Harðarson; (yellow card) 52' Samuel Petrone	Stadium: Fjölnisvöllur; Attendance: 289; Referee: Þóroddur Hjaltalín

24 August 2012 18	Leiknir R.	1–1	Víkingur Ó.	Reykjavík
18:30 GMT	Sindri Björnsson (yellow card) 50'; Kristján Páll Jónsson 87'	Report	10' Arnar Sveinn Geirsson; (yellow card) 67' Edin Beslija; (yellow card) 89' Guðmundur Magnússon	Stadium: Leiknisvöllur; Attendance: - Referee: Lars Müller

1 September 2012 19	Tindastóll	2–1	Leiknir R.	Sauðárkrókur
14:00 GMT	Steven Beattie 31,65'; Arnar Skúli Atlason (yellow card) 39'; Loftur Páll Eiríksson (yellow card) 71'	Report	(yellow card) 42' (goal) 49' Andri Steinn Birgisson; (yellow card) 64' Zlatko Krickic	Stadium: Sauðárkróksvöllur; Attendance: - Referee: Jan Eric Jessen

8 September 2012 20	Leiknir R.	2–1	BÍ/Bolungarvík	Reykjavík
14:00 GMT	Damir Muminovic (yellow card) 27'; Hilmar Árni Halldórsson 44'; Óttar Bjarni Guðmundsson 46'	Report	(yellow card) 29' Daniel Osafo-Badu; 83' Alexander Veigar Þórarinsson	Stadium: Leiknisvöllur; Attendance: - Referee: Garðar Örn Hinriksson

15 September 2012 21	Höttur	2–3	Leiknir R.	Egilsstaðir
14:00 GMT	Ragnar Pétursson (yellow card) 52'; Elvar Þór Ægisson 88' (pen.); Friðrik Ingi Þráinsson 90'	Report	6' Samuel Petrone; (yellow card) 8' Sindri Björnsson; (yellow card) 25' Brynjar Hlöðversson; (yellow card) 55' Óttar Bjarni Guðmundsson; 58' Gunnar Einarsson; 71' Pétur Már Harðarson; (red card) 87' Ólafur Hrannar Kristjánsson	Stadium: Vilhjálmsvöllur; Attendance: - Referee: Erlendur Eiríksson

22 September 2012 22	Leiknir R.	2–0	ÍR	Reykjavík
14:00 GMT	Vigfús Arnar Jósepsson 22'; Andri Steinn Birgisson 80'; Brynjar Hlöðversson (yellow card) 90'	Report	(yellow card) 37' Gunnar Hilmar Kristinsson; (yellow card) 53' Nigel Francis Quashie; (yellow card) 64' Trausti Björn Ríkharðsson	Stadium: Leiknisvöllur; Attendance: 420; Referee: Kristinn Jakobsson

Last updated: 22 September 2012
Source: KSI.is

== Icelandic Cup ==
=== Matches ===
16 May 2012 1	Leiknir R.	3–1	HK	Reykjavík
20:00 GMT	Gunnar Einarsson 36'; Fannar Þór Arnarsson 53' (pen.); Kristján Páll Jónsson 87'	Report	(yellow card) 39' Atli Valsson; (yellow card) 40' (goal) 73' Aron Bjarnason; (yellow card) 53' Bjarki Már Sigvaldason	Stadium: Leiknisvöllur; Attendance: 186; Referee: Jóhann Gunnar Guðmundsson

6 June 2012 2	Leiknir R.	1–2	Þróttur	Reykjavík
19:15 GMT	Kristján Páll Jónsson 20'; Brynjar Hlöðversson (yellow card) 55'; Kjartan Andri Baldvinsson (yellow card) 68'; Gunnar Einarsson (yellow card) 70'; Zlatko Krickic (yellow card) 90'	Report	(yellow card) 32' (goal) 70' Guðfinnur Þórir Ómarsson; (yellow card) 38' Erlingur Jack Guðmundsson; (yellow card) 58' Karl Brynjar Björnsson; (yellow card) 77' Halldór Arnar Hilmisson; 86' Oddur Björnsson	Stadium: Leiknisvöllur; Attendance: - Referee: Valgeir Valgeirsson

== Statistics ==
=== Appearances and goals ===
No.	Pos	Nat	Player	Total		1st Division		Icelandic Cup		League Cup		Reykjavik Cup	
No.	Pos	Nat	Player	Apps	Goals	Apps	Goals	Apps	Goals	Apps	Goals	Apps	Goals
1	GK	(Iceland) ISL	Þorvaldur Rúnarsson	2	0	0	0	0	0	0+2	0	0	0
2	DF	(Iceland) ISL	Stefán Jóhann Eggertsson	33	0	19+2	0	2	0	7	0	1+2	0
4	DF	(Iceland) ISL	Damir Muminovic	28	0	17	0	1	0	7	0	3	0
5	FW	(Iceland) ISL	Gunnar Wigelund	4	0	0+1	0	0+1	0	0+2	0	0	0
6	FW	(Iceland) ISL	Ólafur Hrannar Kristjánsson	30	13	20	9	1	0	4+2	2	3	2
7	FW	(Iceland) ISL	Brynjar Benediktsson	5	0	1+3	0	0+1	0	0	0	0	0
8	MF	(Iceland) ISL	Andri Steinn Birgisson	21	5	11	2	1	0	6	3	3	0
9	MF	(Iceland) ISL	Birkir Björnsson	18	0	2+6	0	0	0	3+4	0	3	0
10	MF	(Iceland) ISL	Fannar Þór Arnarsson	11	3	8+1	2	2	1	0	0	0	0
11	MF	(Iceland) ISL	Brynjar Hlöðversson	22	2	8+4	2	1	0	3+4	0	1+1	0
14	FW	(Iceland) ISL	Kjartan Andri Baldvinsson	23	4	6+6	3	2	0	7	0	1+1	1
15	MF	(Iceland) ISL	Kristján Páll Jónsson	33	8	22	3	2	2	6	2	3	1
16	MF	(Iceland) ISL	Sindri Björnsson	18	2	6+7	2	0	0	0+3	0	0+2	0
17	MF	(Iceland) ISL	Aron Daníelsson	11	0	0+8	0	0	0	1+1	0	0+1	0
18	FW	(United States) USA	Samuel Petrone	9	1	8+1	1	0	0	0	0	0	0
20	DF	(Iceland) ISL	Óttar Bjarni Guðmundsson	31	2	20	1	2	0	6	1	3	0
21	MF	(Iceland) ISL	Hilmar Árni Halldórsson	34	6	22	3	2	0	7	2	3	1
22	GK	(Iceland) ISL	Eyjólfur Tómasson	23	0	11	0	2	0	7	0	3	0
23	DF	(Iceland) ISL	Gunnar Einarsson	31	3	21	2	2	1	4+2	0	2	0
24	MF	(Iceland) ISL	Vigfús Arnar Jósepsson	29	3	19	1	1	0	6	1	3	1
26	MF	(Iceland) ISL	Zlatko Krickic	16	0	7+7	0	1+1	0	0	0	0	0
27	DF	(Iceland) ISL	Pétur Már Harðarson	17	3	3+7	3	0+1	0	1+4	0	1	0
30	MF	(Iceland) ISL	Hrannar Bogi Jónsson	0	0	0	0	0	0	0	0	0	0
-	GK	(Iceland) ISL	Ásgeir Þór Magnússon	11	0	11	0	0	0	0	0	0	0

Last updated: 18 March 2012
Source: Match reports in matches

=== Clean sheets ===
Includes all competitive matches.

R	No.	Pos	Nat	Name	1st Division	Cup	League Cup	Reykjavik Cup	Total	Games	Ratio
1	22	GK	(Iceland)	Eyjólfur Tómasson	3	0	0	1	4	23	0,174
2	22	GK	(Iceland)	Ásgeir Þór Magnússon	1	–	–	–	1	11	0,091
3	1	GK	(Iceland)	Þorvaldur Rúnarsson	–	–	1	–	1	0+2	0,5
				TOTALS	4	0	1	1	6	34	0,176

Last updated: 22 September 2012
Source: Match reports in matches

=== Goals Conceded ===
Includes all competitive matches.

R	No.	Pos	Nat	Name	1st Division	Cup	League Cup	Reykjavik Cup	Total Conceded	Games	Ratio
1	22	GK	(Iceland)	Eyjólfur Tómasson	17	3	15	8	43	23	1,87
2	22	GK	(Iceland)	Ásgeir Þór Magnússon	17	–	–	–	17	11	1,55
3	1	GK	(Iceland)	Þorvaldur Rúnarsson	–	–	2	–	2	0+2	1
				TOTALS	36	3	17	8	64	34	1,88

Last updated: 22 September 2012
Source: Match reports in matches

== Overall ==
Games played	35 (22 – 1st Division, 2 Icelandic Cup, 7 League Cup, 4 Reykjavik Cup)
Games won	11 (6 – 1st Division, 1 Icelandic Cup, 2 League Cup, 2 Reykjavik Cup)
Games drawn	10 (7 – 1st Division, 2 Icelandic Cup, 1 Reykjavik Cup)
Games lost	14 (9 – 1st Division, 1 Icelandic Cup, 3 League Cup, 1 Reykjavik Cup)
Goals scored	57 (33 – 1st Division, 4 Icelandic Cup, 11 League Cup, 9 Reykjavik Cup)
Goals conceded	64 (36 – 1st Division 3 Icelandic Cup, 17 League Cup, 8 Reykjavik Cup)
Goal difference	−7 (−3 – 1st Division, +1 Icelandic Cup, −6 League Cup, +1 Reykjavik Cup)
Clean sheets	6 (4 – 1st Division, 1 Icelandic Cup, 1 Reykjavik Cup)
Yellow cards	68 (45 – 1st Division, 4 Icelandic Cup, 15 League Cup, 4 Reykjavik Cup)
Red cards	4 (4 – 1st Division)
Worst discipline	(Iceland) Óttar Bjarni Guðmundsson (14 (yellow card) )
Best result(s)	W 6 – 1 (H) v Höttur – 1st Division – 13 July 2012
Worst result(s)	L 1 – 5 (H) v Þór Akureyri – 1st Division – 22 July 2012
Most appearances	(Iceland) Hilmar Árni Halldórsson with 34 appearances
Top scorer(s)	(Iceland) Ólafur Hrannar Kristjánsson (13 goals)

Last updated: 22 September 2012
Source: Matches

== Key dates ==
- 12 October 2011: Willum Þór Þórsson is appointed as the new manager on a two-year contract
- 25 October 2011: Andri Steinn Birgisson Joins Leiknir from Keflavík.
- 19 November 2011: Gunnar Einarsson rejoins Leiknir as an assistant manager
- 16 January 2012: Sigursteinn Gíslason former manager and a significant person to the club dies of cancer
- 9 May 2012: Leiknir predicted 4th place for the oncoming season by Fotbolti.net
- 12 May 2012: First game of the season is a 2–0 loss to Þór
- 22 June 2012: Leiknir get their first win of the season in the seventh round away against Víkingur Ó. 0–1
- 30 June 2012: Manager Willum Þór Þórsson is shown the red card in a 1–1 draw against Tindastóll, his second of the season.
- 7 July 2012: Leiknir hit bottom of the table after a 4–3 loss against BÍ/Bolungarvík
- 13 July 2012: Ólafur Hrannar Kristjánsson scores a hattrick in a 6–1 win against Höttur.
- 17 July 2012: Away loss against rivals ÍR 2–1. Eyjólfur Tómasson is shown the red card in the 90th minute.
- 1 September 2012: Leiknis faces relegation after a 2–1 away loss against Tindastóll.
- 3 September 2012: Willum Þór Þórsson is sacked after disappointing results, Gunnar Einarsson is appointed interim manager until the end of the season
- 15 September 2012: Leiknir gets out of relegation zone before the final round and gains 1 point advantage on Höttur after defeating them 3–2.
- 22 September 2012: Leiknir secures its place in the 1st division after a 2–0 home win against ÍR in the last round. ÍR is relegated.
