= Atlantic Cup (Europe) =

The Atlantic Cup was a friendly game contested between the champions of the Icelandic Premier League and the champions of the Faroe Islands Premier League.

== History ==
In 1999 the Icelandic Champions from 1998, ÍBV, visited the Faroe Islands to play a match against the Faroese champions from 1998, HB Tórshavn. The match ended in a 2–2 draw, but because it was a cup game, it was decided on penalties (no extra time was played). The Icelandic team scored on all of their attempts, while the Faroese Champions missed their first penalty, and therefore IBV Vestmannaeyar won the shootout 5–3.

But it was HB who probably should have won the match, as they were leading both 1-0 and 2–1, but allowed IBV to equalize twice, the second equalizer was just 2 minutes from time.

HB had taken the lead through an Andrew av Fløtum goal after 27 minutes. The second half was only into the 1st minute before the teams were level again, because of a HB owngoal. However, HB took the lead again in the 70th minute, thanks to a Bjarki Mohr goal. But just 2 minutes from time, IBV were awarded a penalty, which Sindri Grétarsson converted from the spot to make it a 2–2 draw.

At this time, the cup had no name, but both clubs had enjoyed the match and people were talking about making it an annual meeting.

But no match was played for the next 3 years, then in 2002 the Faroe Islands Football Association, the Football Association of Iceland and the fund FITUR (which provides support to the furthering of cooperation between The Faroe Islands and Iceland, in order to promote further relations between the countries), decided to make it an annual event, that the champions of Faroese and Icelandic leagues should meet in what became the Atlantic Cup. The match was played the last weekend in April, alternating every year between the Faroe Islands, and Iceland.

In 2009 the competition was discontinued.

== Matches ==
=== 2002 Atlantic Cup ===
28 April 2002
16:00

B36 Torshavn	1 – 2	ÍA Akranes
Petersen 90'	Report	Björnsson 44'; Steinsson 46'

Gundadalur, Tórshavn (Faroe Islands)
Referee: Lassin Isaksen (Faroe Islands)

=== 2003 Atlantic Cup ===
27 April 2003
17:00

KR Reykjavík	2 – 0	HB Tórshavn
Gunnlaugsson 29' (pen.); Ólafsson 59'	Report

KR-völlur, Reykjavík (Iceland)
Attendance: 500
Referee: Egill Már Markússon (Iceland)

=== 2004 Atlantic Cup ===
24 April 2004
15:00

HB Torshavn	3 – 1	KR Reykjavík
Nolsøe 13'; Mortensen 24'; Rubeksen 40'	Report	Jónasson 90'

Gundadalur, Tórshavn (Faroe Islands)
Referee: Niklas á Liðarenda (Faroe Islands)

=== 2005 Atlantic Cup ===
24 April 2005
17:00

FH Hafnarfjørður	4 – 1	HB Torshavn
Gudmundsson 23' (pen.), 60'; Borgvardt 30'; Ásgeirsson 80'	Report	Leifsson 85'

Egilshöll, Reykjavík (Iceland)
Referee: Kristinn Jakobsson (Iceland)

=== 2006 Atlantic Cup ===
30 April 2006
15:00

B36 Torshavn	2 – 2	FH Hafnarfjørður
Benjaminsen 12'; Sylla 49'	Report	Snorrason 17'; Guðnason 81'
Penalties
Benjaminsen (penalty scored); Thomassen (penalty scored); Matras (penalty missed) dos Santos (penalty scored)	3 – 1	(penalty missed) Björnsson; (penalty missed) Guðnason; (penalty scored) Vilhjálmsson; (penalty missed) Dyring

Gundadalur, Tórshavn (Faroe Islands)
Referee: Dagfinn Forná (Faroe Islands)

=== 2007 Atlantic Cup ===
In 2007, the match between FH Hafnafjørdur and HB Tórshavn was cancelled. It was planned to take place in Reykjavík in March instead of April, but the fund FITUR, who had sponsored the event, closed down.

The trip to Iceland became too expensive for HB Tórshavn. So HB announced that they would not take part in the Atlantic Cup that year.

=== 2008 Atlantic Cup ===
12 April 2008
14:30

Valur	5 – 2	NSÍ Runavík
Sævarsson 18'; Pálmason 40' (pen.), 60'; Aðalsteinsson 50'; Mortensen 61'	Report	Stojković 45'; Elttør 82' (pen.)

Kópavogsvöllur, Kópavogur (Iceland)
Referee: Kristinn Jakobsson (Iceland)
