= Atlantic Cup =

Atlantic Cup may refer to:

- Atlantic Cup (Major League Soccer), a competition in Major League Soccer
- Atlantic Cup (Europe), an association football (soccer) competition between the champions of Iceland and the Faroe Islands
- Atlantic Cup (Portugal), a winter association football (soccer) competition between guest European club football teams
- Atlantic Cup (Canary Islands), an international tournament for U19 soccer teams held on the island of Gran Canaria, Canary Islands
- Taça do Atlântico, a defunct football tournament in South America
- EFAF Atlantic Cup, an American football competition
- Rugby League Atlantic Cup, an international rugby league football tournament
- Atlantic Alliance Cup, a former Australian rules football competition
