= Hendrik Rubeksen =

Faroese footballer

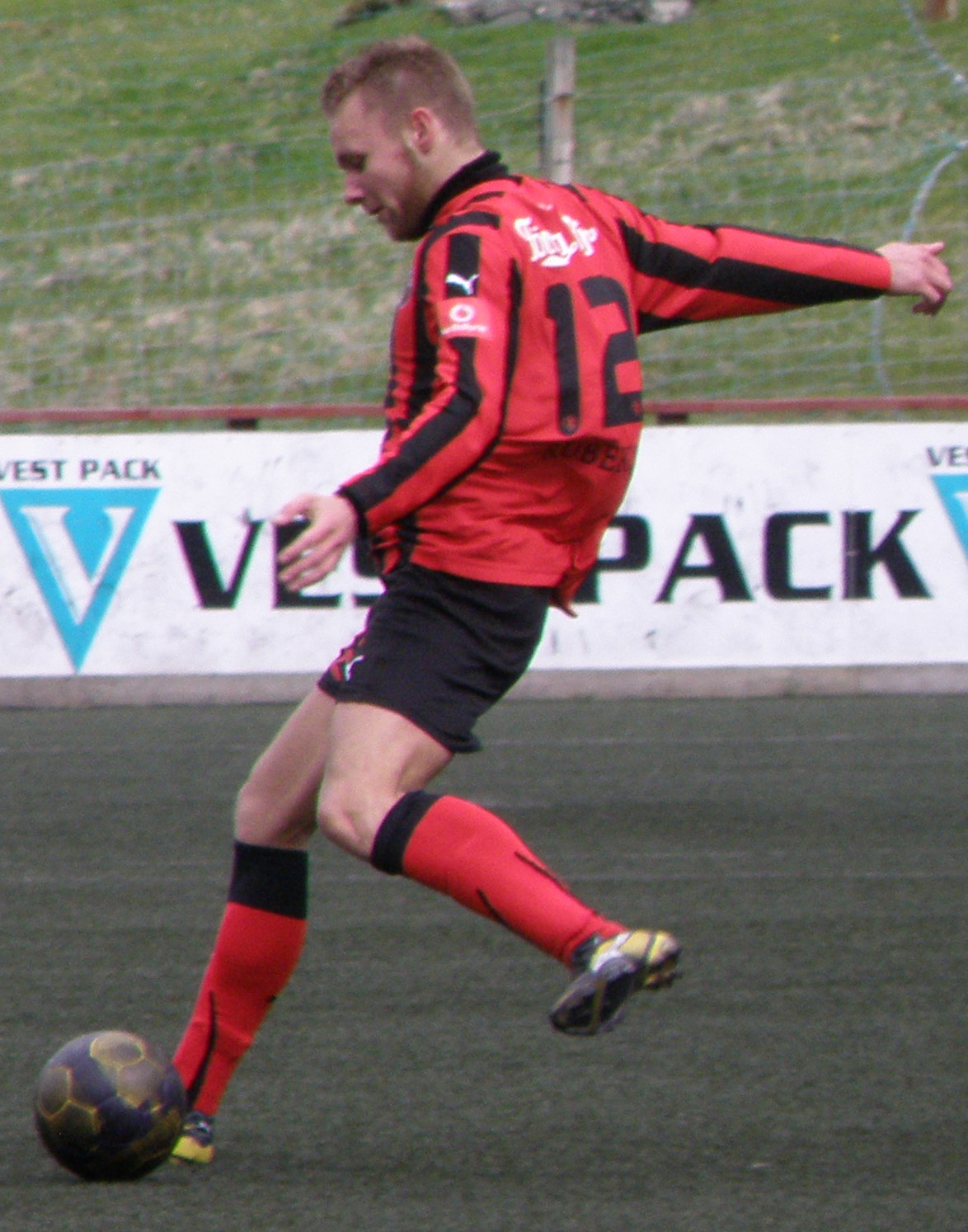
- Hendrik Rubeksen a Faroese Football Player

Personal information
- Date of birth: 1 November 1983 (age 42)
- Place of birth: Tórshavn, Faroe Islands
- Position: Defender

Team information
- Current team: HB Tórshavn

Senior career*
Years	Team	Apps	(Gls)
2004–2006	HB Tórshavn	22	(1)
2006	B68 Toftir	1	(0)
2007	AB Argir	12	(3)
2007	GÍ Gøta	11	(3)
2008	HB Tórshavn	13	(5)
2009	07 Vestur	19	(2)
2010–	HB Tórshavn	23	(3)

International career
2010–	Faroe Islands	4	(0)
- * Club domestic league appearances and goals

Hendrik Rubeksen (born 1 November 1983) is a Faroese international footballer who plays club football for HB Tórshavn, as a defender.

== Career ==
He made his international debut for the Faroe Islands national football team in 2010.
