= Aljaž Ploj =

Slovenian footballer

Personal information
- Date of birth: 30 August 1998 (age 28)
- Position: Defender

Team information
- Current team: USV St. Anna/Aigen
- Number: 21

Youth career
- Pobrežje
- Maribor
- 2013–2017: Aluminij

Senior career*
Years	Team	Apps	(Gls)
2016–2022	Aluminij	80	(0)
2022	Bistrica	9	(0)
2023–	USV St. Anna/Aigen	23	(1)

International career
2019–2021	Slovenia U21	6	(0)
- * Club domestic league appearances and goals as of 1 January 2024

Aljaž Ploj (born 30 August 1998) is a Slovenian footballer who plays for Austrian club USV St. Anna/Aigen as a defender.

== Club career ==
Ploj made his Slovenian PrvaLiga debut for Aluminij on 7 March 2018 in a game against Olimpija Ljubljana.

== International career ==
Ploj was part of the Slovenia under-21 team at the 2021 UEFA European Under-21 Championship, and made one appearance at the tournament.
