= Dejan Stojković =

Serbian footballer

Personal information
- Date of birth: 11 July 1977 (age 49)
- Place of birth: Belgrade, SFR Yugoslavia
- Height: 1.84 m (6 ft 1/2 in)
- Position: Forward

Senior career*
Years	Team	Apps	(Gls)
1996–1997	Rad	4	(0)
1999–2000	Milicionar	17	(2)
2000	Uralan Elista	5	(0)
2000–2001	Milicionar	5	(1)
2001–2002	Železnik	11	(2)
2005	ŁKS Łódź	6	(0)
2007–2008	Sloga Kraljevo	6	(0)
2008	NSÍ Runavík	4	(0)
2008–2009	Radnički Kragujevac		
- * Club domestic league appearances and goals

Dejan Stojković (Serbian Cyrillic: Дејан Стојковић; born 11 July 1977) is a Serbian retired footballer who played as a forward.

== Honours ==
Runavík

- Faroe Islands Super Cup: 2008
