= 1996–97 Eerste Divisie =

41st season of the second-tier football league in Netherlands

Eerste Divisie
- Season: 1996–97
- Champions: MVV
- Promoted: MVV
- Goals: 884
- Average goals/game: 2.88

The Dutch Eerste Divisie in the 1996–97 season was contested by 18 teams. MVV won the championship.

== New entrants ==
Relegated from the 1995–96 Eredivisie

- Go Ahead Eagles

== League standings ==
Pos	Team	Pld	W	D	L	GF	GA	GD	Pts	Promotion or qualification
1	MVV	34	20	10	4	62	30	+32	70	Promotion to Eredivisie
2	Cambuur Leeuwarden	34	20	7	7	65	33	+32	67	Play-offs
3	FC Emmen	34	18	9	7	58	36	+22	63	Play-offs
4	VVV-Venlo	34	16	9	9	55	40	+15	57	Play-offs
5	FC Zwolle	34	15	10	9	52	40	+12	55	Play-offs
6	Go Ahead Eagles	34	16	7	11	58	48	+10	55	Play-offs
7	FC Den Bosch	34	16	6	12	55	43	+12	54	
8	ADO Den Haag	34	14	10	10	48	48	0	52	Play-offs
9	FC Eindhoven	34	14	8	12	53	53	0	50	
10	Veendam	34	13	10	11	44	35	+9	49	
11	TOP Oss	34	13	8	13	46	50	−4	47	
12	Dordrecht '90	34	13	7	14	45	49	−4	46	
13	SC Heracles	34	9	10	15	51	50	+1	37	
14	Helmond Sport	34	10	6	18	46	64	−18	36	
15	RBC Roosendaal	34	10	5	19	41	63	−22	35	
16	Telstar	34	7	7	20	34	68	−34	28	
17	Excelsior	34	6	6	22	37	67	−30	24	
18	HFC Haarlem	34	5	7	22	34	67	−33	22	

Source: rsssf.com

== Promotion/relegation play-offs ==
In the promotion/relegation competition, eight entrants (six from this league and two from the Eredivisie) entered in two groups. The group winners were promoted to the Eredivisie.

Group 1
Pos	Team	Pld	W	D	L	GF	GA	GD	Pts	Qualification
1	RKC Waalwijk	6	5	0	1	19	6	+13	15	Remain in Eredivisie
2	FC Zwolle	6	3	1	2	6	9	−3	10	
3	FC Emmen	6	2	1	3	8	10	−2	7	
4	ADO Den Haag	6	0	2	4	3	11	−8	2	

Source: rsssf.com

Group 2
Pos	Team	Pld	W	D	L	GF	GA	GD	Pts	Qualification
1	NEC Nijmegen	6	5	0	1	19	5	+14	15	Remain in Eredivisie
2	Go Ahead Eagles	6	5	0	1	17	8	+9	15	
3	Cambuur Leeuwarden	6	2	0	4	8	15	−7	6	
4	VVV-Venlo	6	0	0	6	6	22	−16	0	

Source: rsssf.com

== Attendances ==
#	Club	Average
1	Emmen	5,704
2	Cambuur	4,944
3	MVV	4,684
4	Go Ahead	4,458
5	Veendam	4,069
6	Zwolle	3,600
7	ADO	3,279
8	VVV	3,103
9	Oss	2,361
10	Eindhoven	2,203
11	Heracles	2,115
12	Den Bosch	2,087
13	Helmond	2,017
14	Dordrecht	1,700
15	RBC	1,644
16	Haarlem	1,594
17	Telstar	1,376
18	Excelsior	1,049

== See also ==
- 1996–97 Eredivisie
- 1996–97 KNVB Cup
