= Paolo Nicolato =

Italian footballer and manager

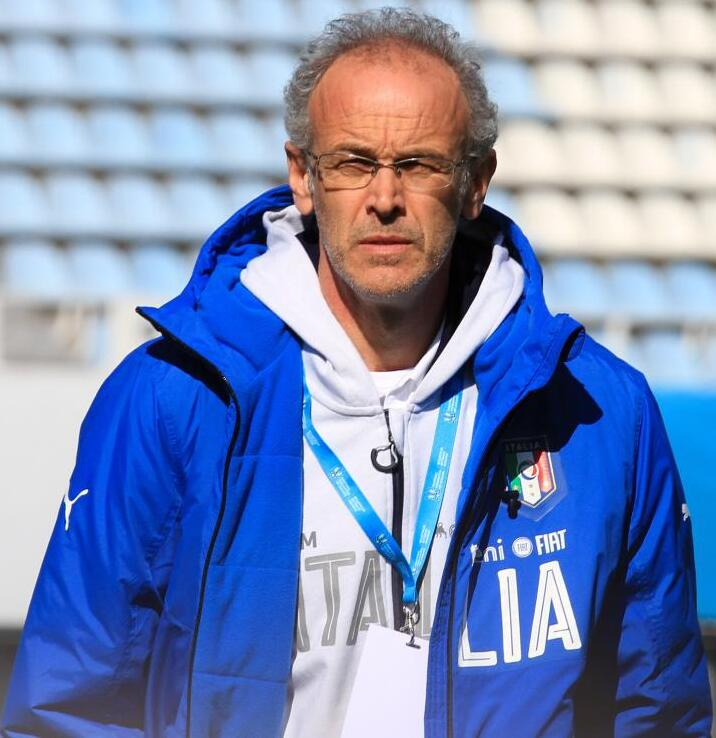
- Nicolato with Italy U18 in 2017

Personal information
- Date of birth: 21 December 1966 (age 59)
- Place of birth: Lonigo, Italy

Managerial career
- Years: Team
- 1999–2014: Chievo (youth)
- 2014: Lumezzane
- 2015: Lumezzane
- 2015–2016: Lumezzane
- 2016–2017: Italy U18
- 2017–2018: Italy U19
- 2018–2019: Italy U20
- 2019–2023: Italy U21
- 2024–2026: Latvia

Paolo Nicolato (born 21 December 1966) is an Italian professional football manager.

== Managerial career ==
A long-time coach with the youth academy of Chievo, Nicolato was appointed the manager of Lumezzane in the Serie C from 2014 to 2016. In 2016 he was appointed the manager of the Italy U18s, and he was subsequently promoted to the U19s, U20s, and then finally the Italy U21s on 3 July 2019.

On 5 February 2024, Nicolato was named the head coach of Latvia national team. In May 2026, the LFF decided to extend his contract for another two years.

== Managerial statistics ==
As of match played 15 November 2026

Managerial record by team and tenure
Team	Nat	From	To	Record							
Team	Nat	From	To	G	W	D	L	GF	GA	GD	Win %
Lumezzane	(Italy)	10 July 2014	30 October 2014	13	2	5	6	12	17	−5	15.38
Lumezzane	(Italy)	12 March 2015	30 June 2015	11	3	4	4	7	8	−1	27.27
Lumezzane	(Italy)	9 December 2015	15 February 2016	8	2	1	5	6	10	−4	25.00
Italy U18	(Italy)	4 August 2016	4 August 2017	9	3	4	2	18	15	+3	33.33
Italy U19	(Italy)	4 August 2017	1 August 2018	18	11	3	4	38	22	+16	61.11
Italy U20	(Italy)	1 August 2018	3 July 2019	15	6	2	7	22	19	+3	40.00
Italy U21	(Italy)	3 July 2019	4 August 2023	20	14	4	2	48	14	+34	70.00
Latvia	(Latvia)	5 February 2024	20 November 2026	30	5	10	15	18	40	−22	16.67
Total				124	46	33	45	169	145	+24	37.10
