= Valur (club) =

Icelandic athletic club

- Full name: Knattspyrnufélagið Valur
- Nickname: Valsarar; Hlíðarendapiltar
- Sports: Basketball, Football, Handball
- Founded: 11 May 1911; 115 years ago
- Home ground: Hlíðarendi; Reykjavík; Iceland
- Chairman: Árni Pétur Jónsson
- Website: www.valur.is

Knattspyrnufélagið Valur (Icelandic pronunciation: [ˈkʰnahtˌspɪ(r)tnʏˌfjɛːˌlaijɪð ˈvaːlʏr̥], lit. 'Gyrfalcon Football Club' (Note: Knattspyrnufélagið is the definite form of Knattspyrnufélag, meaning "the football club".)) is an Icelandic multi-sport club based in Reykjavík, Iceland. The club is situated close to the city center, in the east side of town, on the former farmland of Hlíðarendi. The club was originally formed as part of the local YMCA to play association football, but later incorporated handball and basketball. Valur's handball section reached the EHF Champions League final in 1980. It has won the Icelandic league 22 times, more than any other Icelandic handball team.

In 2019, Valur women's teams won the national championships in basketball, football, and handball, the first time that one club held all three major titles. The Valur women's basketball team also won all four major titles during the year and 47 of their 50 games. For this feat, it was selected as the Icelandic Sports Team of the Year by the Icelandic Association of Sports Journalists in an annual ceremony held by the National Olympic and Sports Association of Iceland.

== History ==
The club was founded on 11 May 1911, as a subdivision of KFUM, the Icelandic YMCA. Later that year its name was changed to Valur, which is an Icelandic word for gyrfalcon. In 1930 the club won its first national title, and it has been amongst the best football teams in the country ever since. In 1939 Valur bought the farmland of Hlíðarendi which retains its name even today, where they now have a football field and an indoor arena.

Originally Valur played only football, but around 1940 the club got involved in more sports, starting with men's handball. They won their first national handball title in 1940, and reached the final of the EHF Champions League in 1980. In the post-war era (1948), a women's handball division was started at Valur, and in the 1970s a women's football division was added. In 1970, Körfuknattleiksfélag Reykjavíkur (Reykjavík Basketball Club, KFR) joined Valur and became their basketball division.

Valur is the most successful sports club in the 3 biggest sports in Iceland with 133 titles across football, handball, and basketball in both men's and women's National and Cup championships. It is the wealthiest sports club in Iceland.

== Stadia ==
The grounds at Hlíðarendi were completely renovated in the years between 2004 and 2007. Valur's football teams currently play their home games at Valsvöllur and basketball and handball teams in the Valshöllin, the first section of the new grounds to be utilized. The football pitch was used for the first time in the 2008 season.

In June 2007 the club signed a 5-year sponsorship deal with Vodafone. In June 2018 the club signed a five-year sponsorship deal with Origo which saw the football stadium being renamed Origovöllurinn and the indoor stadium being renamed Origo-höllin (English: Origo arena).

== Clubs ==
=== Basketball ===
==== Men's ====
The Valur men's basketball team was founded as Gosi on 25 December 1951 and was one of the founding members of the Icelandic men's top division. On 22 December 1957 the club changed its name to Körfuknattleiksfélag Reykjavíkur (Reykjavík Basketball Club) and played under that name until 1970. On 3 October 1970 the club merged into Valur sports club and became its basketball department.

Under the new name it has won the Icelandic Championship three times, 1980,1983 and 2022, and the Icelandic cup four times, 1980, 1981, 1983 and 2023.

===== Titles =====
- Icelandic Championships: 4

- 1980, 1983, 2022, 2024

- Cup Champions: 5

- 1980, 1981, 1983, 2023, 2025

==== Women's ====
Valur first played in the Icelandic top-tier basketball league in 1993. In April 2019, the team won its first ever national championship when it beat Keflavík in the Úrvalsdeild finals 3–0.

=== Football ===
==== Men's ====
The Valur men's football team participated in the Icelandic soccer tournament for the first time in 1915 and became the Icelandic champion for the first time in 1930. In total, it has won the Icelandic championship 23 times, most recently in 2020.

===== Titles =====
Úrvalsdeild

- Champions (23): 1930, 1933, 1935, 1936, 1937, 1938, 1940, 1942, 1943, 1944, 1945, 1956, 1966, 1967, 1976, 1978, 1980, 1985, 1987, 2007, 2017, 2018, 2020*
- Due to the COVID-19 pandemic, the season was cancelled with four games left to play. Valur was awarded the title as the team in first at the time of suspension.

Icelandic Cup

- Champions (11): 1965, 1974, 1976, 1977, 1988, 1990, 1991, 1992, 2005, 2015, 2016

Icelandic League Cup

- Champions (3): 2008, 2011, 2018

Icelandic Super Cup

- Champions (11): 1977, 1979, 1988, 1991, 1992, 1993, 2006, 2008, 2016, 2017, 2018

==== Women's ====
The Valur women's football team has won the Icelandic championship 10 times and the Icelandic Women's Cup 13 times.

===== Titles =====
- Icelandic Championships: 12

- 1978, 1986, 1988, 1989, 2004, 2006, 2007, 2008, 2009, 2010, 2019, 2021

- Cup Champions: 14

- 1984, 1985, 1986, 1987, 1988, 1990, 1995, 2001, 2003, 2006, 2009, 2010, 2011, 2022

=== Handball ===
==== Men's ====
===== Titles =====
- Icelandic Championships: 24

- 1940, 1941, 1942, 1944, 1947, 1948, 1951, 1955, 1973, 1977, 1978, 1979, 1988, 1989, 1991, 1993, 1994, 1995, 1996, 1998, 2007, 2017, 2021, 2022

- Cup Champions: 12

- 1974, 1988, 1990, 1993, 1998, 2008, 2009, 2011, 2016, 2017, 2021, 2022

- Icelandic Super Cup: 1

- 2009

- EHF Champions League:

- Final 1980

- EHF European Cup:
  - Champions : 2023–24

==== Women's ====
===== Titles =====
- Icelandic Championships: 18

- 1962, 1964, 1965, 1966, 1967, 1968, 1969, 1971, 1972, 1973, 1974, 1983, 2010, 2011, 2012, 2014, 2019, 2023

- Cup Champions: 8

- 1988, 1993, 2000, 2012, 2013, 2014, 2019, 2022
