= Birkir Kristinsson =

Icelandic footballer (born 1964)

Personal information
- Date of birth: 15 August 1964 (age 62)
- Place of birth: Vestmannaeyjar, Iceland
- Height: 1.86 m (6 ft 1 in)
- Position: Goalkeeper

Youth career
- ÍBV Vestmannaeyjar

Senior career*
Years	Team	Apps	(Gls)
1983	Einherji	18	(0)
1984	KA Akureyri	2	(0)
1985–1987	ÍA Akranes	54	(0)
1988–1995	Fram Reykjavík	144	(0)
1996–1997	Brann	15	(0)
1996	→ Birmingham City (loan)	0	(0)
1998	IFK Norrköping	3	(0)
1998–1999	Bolton Wanderers	0	(0)
1999–2005	ÍBV Vestmannaeyjar	120	(0)
1999–2000	→ Austria Lustenau (loan)	7	(0)
2000–2001	→ Stoke City (loan)	18	(0)
Total		381	(0)

International career
1988–2004	Iceland	74	(0)
- * Club domestic league appearances and goals

Birkir Kristinsson (born 15 August 1964) is an Icelandic former professional footballer who played as a goalkeeper.

== Club career ==
Birkir started his career with local Vestmannaeyjar team ÍBV, and also played with Einherji from Vopnafjordur, KA from Akureyri, ÍA and Fram in the Icelandic league before moving to Norway with Brann in 1996, where he is still considered as a hero, after his efforts in the cup winner's cup in 1997, where SK Brann reached the quarter-finals. He moved to English club Birmingham City and after failing to make an impression there, he moved on to spells with Swedish side IFK Norrköping, Bolton Wanderers and Austrian club Lustenau before making a return to ÍBV. In December 2000 he moved to Stoke City where his brother Magnús Kristinsson was a member of the Icelandic board at Stoke. He made a decent enough start at Stoke taking over from Gavin Ward until he made a mistake against Northampton Town in February 2001. He did retain his place in the side but after conceding three goals against lowly Cambridge United Ward was reinstated. He didn't make an appearance in 2001–02 and returned to Iceland playing for ÍBV.

== International career ==
Birkir earned 72 caps for the Iceland national team, over a period of sixteen years. His last international match was against Italy in Reykjavík 15 August 2004, where Iceland beat Italy 2–0. Birkir Kristinsson turned 40 that day.

== Career statistics ==
=== Club ===
Appearances and goals by club, season and competition
Club	Season	League			National cup		League cup		Other (Note: Includes Football League Trophy.)		Total	
Club	Season	Division	Apps	Goals	Apps	Goals	Apps	Goals	Goals	Apps	Goals	Apps
Einherji	1983	1. deild karla	18	0	—		—		—		18	0
KA Akureyri	1984	Úrvalsdeild	2	0	—		—		—		2	0
ÍA	1985	Úrvalsdeild	18	0	—		—		—		18	0
ÍA	1986	Úrvalsdeild	18	0	—		—		—		18	0
ÍA	1987	Úrvalsdeild	18	0	—		—		—		18	0
ÍA	Total		54	0	0	0	0	0	0	0	54	0
Fram Reykjavík	1988	Úrvalsdeild	18	0	—		—		—		18	0
Fram Reykjavík	1989	Úrvalsdeild	18	0	—		—		—		18	0
Fram Reykjavík	1990	Úrvalsdeild	18	0	—		—		—		18	0
Fram Reykjavík	1991	Úrvalsdeild	18	0	—		—		—		18	0
Fram Reykjavík	1992	Úrvalsdeild	18	0	—		—		—		18	0
Fram Reykjavík	1993	Úrvalsdeild	18	0	—		—		—		18	0
Fram Reykjavík	1994	Úrvalsdeild	18	0	—		—		—		18	0
Fram Reykjavík	1995	Úrvalsdeild	18	0	—		—		—		18	0
Fram Reykjavík	Total		144	0	0	0	0	0	0	0	144	0
Brann	1996	Tippeligaen	14	0	—		—		—		14	0
Brann	1997	Tippeligaen	1	0	—		—		—		1	0
Brann	Total		15	0	0	0	0	0	0	0	15	0
IFK Norrköping	1998	Allsvenskan	3	0	—		—		—		3	0
ÍBV	1999	Úrvalsdeild	18	0	—		—		—		18	0
ÍBV	2000	Úrvalsdeild	18	0	—		—		—		18	0
ÍBV	2001	Úrvalsdeild	18	0	—		—		—		18	0
ÍBV	2002	Úrvalsdeild	18	0	—		—		—		18	0
ÍBV	2003	Úrvalsdeild	18	0	—		—		—		18	0
ÍBV	2004	Úrvalsdeild	18	0	—		—		—		18	0
ÍBV	2005	Úrvalsdeild	12	0	—		—		—		12	0
ÍBV	Total		120	0	0	0	0	0	0	0	120	0
Austria Lustenau (loan)	1999–2000	Austrian Bundesliga	7	0	—		—		—		7	0
Stoke City (loan)	2000–01	Second Division	18	0	0	0	0	0	4	0	22	0
Stoke City (loan)	2001–02	Second Division	0	0	0	0	0	0	0	0	0	0
Stoke City (loan)	Total		18	0	0	0	0	0	4	0	22	0
Career total			381	0	0	0	0	0	4	0	385	0

=== International ===
Appearances and goals by national team and year
National team	Year	Apps	Goals
Iceland	1990	3	0
Iceland	1991	3	0
Iceland	1992	8	0
Iceland	1993	6	0
Iceland	1994	9	0
Iceland	1995	7	0
Iceland	1996	10	0
Iceland	1998	7	0
Iceland	1999	10	0
Iceland	2000	5	0
Iceland	2001	1	0
Iceland	2002	2	0
Iceland	2004	1	0
Total		72	0
