= Sigursteinn Gíslason =

Icelandic footballer and manager (1968–2012)

Personal information
- Full name: Sigursteinn Davíð Gíslason
- Date of birth: 25 June 1968
- Place of birth: Akranes, Iceland
- Date of death: 16 January 2012 (aged 43)
- Place of death: Reykjavík, Iceland
- Height: 1.75 m (5 ft 9 in)
- Positions: Defender; midfielder

Senior career*
| Years | Team | Apps | (Gls) |
| 1986–1987 | KR | 5 | (0) |
| 1988–1998 | ÍA | 164 | (17) |
| 1999–2003 | KR | 72 | (1) |
| 1999–2000 | → Stoke City (loan) | 8 | (0) |
| 2004 | Víkingur R. | 8 | (0) |
| Total | | 257 | (18) |

International career
| 1993–1999 | Iceland | 22 | (0) |

Managerial career
- 2005: KR (caretaker)
- 2008–2011: Leiknir Reykjavík
- * Club domestic league appearances and goals

Sigursteinn Davíð Gíslason (25 June 1968 – 16 January 2012) was an Icelandic football player and manager. A left-sided defender who could also play in midfield, he spent the majority of his playing career in his home country; he started his career with KR and later had spells with ÍA and Víkingur Reykjavík. During the 1999–2000 season, Sigursteinn joined English club Stoke City and played eight matches in the Football League. Following his retirement from playing, he became a coach at his former club KR and went on to spend three years as the club's assistant manager. In 2008, Sigursteinn was appointed as manager of Leiknir Reykjavík, a position he held for more than two seasons before being forced to retire through illness.

== Playing career ==
=== Club ===
Although born in Akranes, Sigursteinn started his career with KR Reykjavík, where he joined the reserve team in 1985. He was part of the team that beat Þróttur 6–3 in the final of the 1986 Reykjavík Championship, and was a regular for the side over the following two seasons. On 16 August 1987, Sigursteinn made his first-team debut for KR, coming on as a second-half substitute for Gunnar Skúlason in the 0–1 defeat to Keflavík. He was given his first start by manager Gordon Lee five days later as the team suffered another home defeat, losing 2–3 to ÍA. By the end of the 1987 season, he had made five senior appearances for KR.

Ahead of the 1988 campaign, Sigursteinn returned to Akranes to join his hometown club ÍA as one of seven new signings. He was selected in the starting line-up for the first game of the season against Leiftur on 15 May 1988, but was forced to leave the pitch in the tenth minute after sustaining an injury in a clash with an opposition player. He scored his first goal in senior football in the 3–1 win against the same club in the return match on 16 July 1988. In total, he played 12 matches and scored twice during the 1988 campaign. The following year, Sigursteinn scored one goal in 13 appearances as ÍA achieved a sixth-place finish. During the 1990 season, he established himself as a first-team regular, starting every league match. He also netted three goals, which included two in successive matches against FH and Valur in July. However, the season ended in disappointment for ÍA as they won only 3 of their 18 league fixtures and finished bottom of the division and were thereby relegated to the second tier of Icelandic football.

Sigursteinn played 17 matches and scored 5 goals during the 1991 season as the team regained their place in the top division after a one-year absence. He again missed only one match of the 1992 campaign as ÍA were crowned champions of the Úrvalsdeild for the first time since 1984. Over the next four seasons he remained a regular starter as the side won five consecutive league championships, becoming the first club to accomplish the feat since Fram more than 80 years earlier. In 1994, Sigursteinn was awarded Icelandic Player of the Year, the third ÍA player in succession to win the accolade after Luka Kostic and Sigurður Jónsson. That year, he was offered a chance to turn professional by moving to Swedish outfit Örgryte IS, but he declined and went on to stay with ÍA until the end of the 1998 season, making well over 160 appearances in all competitions for the club.

On 14 January 1999, Sigursteinn returned to his first club KR. During his first season back, KR won the Icelandic league for the first time since 1968. He played a total of 20 league and cup matches and scored once, netting the team's fourth goal in the 5–1 win against Valur on 27 May 1999. In November of the same year, he joined English Football League Second Division side Stoke City on loan, along with manager Guðjón Þórðarson and a number of other Icelandic players. Sigursteinn made his debut for Stoke in the 4–0 away win over Wycombe Wanderers on 23 November 1999, although he was substituted for compatriot Einar Daníelsson after suffering a dislocated shoulder. He failed to firmly establish his first-team place during his time in England, starting only four league matches for Stoke and making a further four substitute appearances. He also played four games in the Football League Trophy, a tournament that Stoke went on to win that season.

Sigursteinn returned from his loan spell in time for the new season with KR. The 2000 campaign was another successful one for both him and the team; he played in every match as the side defended their league title. A sixth-place finish followed in 2001, but the next two seasons yielded another two league championships, taking his personal tally to nine Icelandic titles. During his second spell with KR, Sigursteinn played 72 league matches, in addition to several cup appearances, including 10 games in European competitions. He finished his playing career with a short stint as player–assistant manager at Víkingur Reykjavík, where he played eight matches during the 2004 season before retiring to concentrate on his coaching career.

=== International ===
Sigursteinn received his first call-up to the Iceland national team for the friendly international against Tunisia on 17 October 1993, one of four uncapped players selected in the 16-man squad by manager Ásgeir Elíasson. He played the first 58 minutes of the match before being replaced by Ólafur Helgi Kristjánsson. During the 1994 season he appeared in ten matches for Iceland, including three qualifying matches for UEFA Euro 1996 and three consecutive friendly victories against Bolivia, Estonia and the United Arab Emirates. Several of his ÍA team-mates also played for Iceland during this time, including Ólafur Þórðarson, Haraldur Ingólfsson and Sigurður Jónsson. However, Iceland finished bottom of their qualifying group for Euro 1996 with only one win from eight matches. Sigursteinn continued to play for his country for the following three years, although he was not a regular starter for the team. He was dropped following the 0–0 draw with Lithuania on 11 June 1997 and did not appear again for Iceland for over two years.

On 15 August 1999, Sigursteinn was drafted into the Iceland squad for the friendly against the Faroe Islands after Sigurður Jónsson was forced to withdraw due to injury. It was the first time he had been called up to the national team under Guðjón Þórðarson. He entered the match as a first-half substitute, coming on for Auðun Helgason in the 35th minute to win his 22nd and final cap for his country.

== Coaching career ==
Sigursteinn began his coaching career in 1988 when he took charge of the under-14 team at ÍA. During his time with Víkingur, he also served as assistant manager to Sigurður Jónsson. In November 2004 he was hired as reserve team coach at his former club KR, and appointed fellow former Iceland international Einar Daníelsson as his assistant. Following the sacking of the KR first-team manager Magnús Gylfason after the 1–3 home defeat to Keflavík on 24 July 2005, Sigursteinn was appointed caretaker manager for the last six matches of the 2005 season. His first match in charge was the 0–2 defeat away at FH on 7 August 2005. A week later he led the team to a 1–0 home win against ÍBV, the first of four consecutive victories. A last-day loss to ÍA meant that KR ended the campaign in sixth place in the Úrvalsdeild. When Teitur Þórðarson was hired as manager for the 2006 season, Sigursteinn returned to the assistant manager position under the new coach. Teitur was replaced as KR manager two years later by Logi Ólafsson, but Sigursteinn again remained with the club as assistant manager.

At the end of the 2008 season, Sigursteinn was appointed as manager of 1. deild karla side Leiknir Reykjavík on a three-year contract. He replaced Garðar Gunnar Ásgeirsson, who had led the club to a seventh-place finish in 2008. He made several new signings ahead of the 2009 campaign; three players arrived from Leiknir's feeder club KB, while Kristján Páll Jónsson returned from a loan spell with Tindastóll. Sigursteinn also signed his former KR team-mate Gunnar Einarsson from Valur as both a player and as his assistant. A number of players left the club during the close season including Jakob Spangsberg, the top goalscorer in 2008, and first-team captain Vigfús Arnar Jósepsson. Sigursteinn appointed midfielder Halldór Kristinn Halldórsson as captain in his place. In 2008, he led Leiknir to a seventh-placed finish in the 1. deild for the second consecutive year, ending the season with a 3–2 home win over Afturelding.

A number of new signings were again made ahead of the 2010 season, including the return of former captain Vigfús Arnar Jósepsson. Leiknir started the campaign well, winning five of their first six matches. On 14 July 2010, Sigursteinn was given a one-match ban by the KSÍ. He guided the team to a third-place finish at the end of the season, having won 13 out of 22 league matches. The side also reached the third round of the Icelandic Cup before being knocked out by Stjarnan. Sigursteinn declared himself happy with the league campaign, despite having missed out on promotion to the Úrvalsdeild on the last day. Leiknir's 1–3 home defeat to Fjölnir coupled with a 9–1 win for Þór Akureyri over Fjarðabyggð meant that the second promotion spot went to the Akureyri club thanks to their superior goal difference. In the end of season awards, Sigursteinn was named 1. deild Manager of the Year while several Leiknir players were selected in the Team of the Year.

In September 2010, Sigursteinn announced he would continue to manage Leiknir for the 2011 season. He was in charge for the first match of the campaign, a goalless draw with KA on 13 May 2011. The game proved to be his last as manager as four days later he took sick leave after being diagnosed with cancer. He intended to return to coaching after recovering from kidney surgery. Assistant manager Gunnar Einarsson and former Leiknir manager Garðar Gunnar Ásgeirsson were appointed to take joint control of the team in his absence. However, the pair could not guide the team to victory during almost two months in charge, leaving the team in the 1. deild relegation zone. On 11 July 2011 the Leiknir board dismissed Sigursteinn and hired Serbian coach Zoran Miljkovic as manager. In a statement two days later he thanked Leiknir for his time with the club, but claimed that he had been sacked, rather than being asked to step down as manager.

== Personal life and death ==
Sigursteinn was born in Akranes, on the west coast of Iceland, on 25 June 1968. He was the only child of Margrét Teitsdóttir and Gísli Víglundsson, although he also had four half-siblings. He married Anna Elín Daníelsdóttir on 27 November 1994. The couple had two sons, Magnús Sveinn and Teitur Leó, and a daughter, Unnur Elín. Another daughter, Sóley, was born in 1997 but died in infancy. While living in Akranes, Sigursteinn combined football with his job at the town council. In 1999, he and Anna moved to Reykjavík when he joined KR. The following year he started work with the transportation firm TVG-Zimsen and later found employment with shipping company Eimskip, where he worked until his death.

In May 2011, he was diagnosed with terminal cancer of the left kidney and discovered that the disease had also spread to his right kidney and both of his lungs. Two weeks after the diagnosis, he underwent an operation to remove his kidneys and was given a course of medication. Although the cancer was terminal, the surgery was successful in extending his life by several months. On 18 June 2011, a charity match between his former clubs KR and ÍA was held in his honour. The match featured fifteen of the players and coaches who had appeared in the 1996 Icelandic Super Cup Final. A crowd of almost 4,000 spectators watched the 2–2 draw, the fourth highest ever attendance at the Akranesvöllur, the home ground of ÍA.

On 16 January 2012, eight months after being diagnosed with cancer, Sigursteinn died at the National University Hospital in Reykjavík at the age of 43. He was survived by his wife and children. His funeral took place at the Hallgrímskirkja, the largest church in Iceland, on 26 January 2012. Following his death, many Icelandic football players and managers paid tribute to him. Leiknir midfielder Óttar Bjarni Guðmundsson described him as a great coach and a magnificent person who would always help his players. Sigursteinn's manager during his second spell with KR, Willum Þór Þórsson, paid tribute to his positive attitude as a player and praised his leadership abilities, while his former ÍA and Iceland team-mate Ólafur Adolfsson described him as a popular man who always put the interests of the team above his own.

== Career statistics ==
=== Club ===
Appearances and goals by club, season and competition
| Club | Season | League | | | FA Cup | | League Cup | | Other (Note: Includes Icelandic Super Cup and Football League Trophy.) | | Total | |
| Club | Season | Division | Apps | Goals | Apps | Goals | Apps | Goals | Apps | Goals | Apps | Goals |
|---|---|---|---|---|---|---|---|---|---|---|---|---|
| KR | 1987 | Úrvalsdeild | 5 | 0 | 0 | 0 | – | | – | | 5 | 0 |
| ÍA | 1988 | Úrvalsdeild | 12 | 2 | 0 | 0 | – | | – | | 12 | 2 |
| ÍA | 1989 | Úrvalsdeild | 13 | 1 | 0 | 0 | – | | – | | 13 | 1 |
| ÍA | 1990 | Úrvalsdeild | 18 | 3 | 0 | 0 | – | | – | | 18 | 3 |
| ÍA | 1991 | 1. deild karla | 17 | 5 | 0 | 0 | – | | – | | 17 | 5 |
| ÍA | 1992 | Úrvalsdeild | 17 | 2 | 3 | 0 | – | | – | | 20 | 2 |
| ÍA | 1993 | Úrvalsdeild | 15 | 1 | 4 | 0 | – | | 1 | 0 | 20 | 1 |
| ÍA | 1994 | Úrvalsdeild | 17 | 2 | 0 | 0 | – | | 1 | 0 | 18 | 2 |
| ÍA | 1995 | Úrvalsdeild | 18 | 0 | 0 | 0 | – | | – | | 18 | 0 |
| ÍA | 1996 | Úrvalsdeild | 16 | 0 | 0 | 0 | – | | 2 | 0 | 18 | 0 |
| ÍA | 1997 | Úrvalsdeild | 10 | 1 | 0 | 0 | – | | – | | 10 | 1 |
| ÍA | 1998 | Úrvalsdeild | 11 | 0 | 0 | 0 | – | | – | | 11 | 0 |
| KR | 1999 | Úrvalsdeild | 16 | 1 | 0 | 0 | – | | – | | 16 | 1 |
| Stoke City (loan) | 1999–2000 | Second Division | 8 | 0 | 0 | 0 | 0 | 0 | 4 | 0 | 12 | 0 |
| KR | 2000 | Úrvalsdeild | 18 | 0 | 0 | 0 | – | | – | | 18 | 0 |
| KR | 2001 | Úrvalsdeild | 17 | 0 | 2 | 0 | 5 | 0 | – | | 24 | 0 |
| KR | 2002 | Úrvalsdeild | 6 | 0 | 0 | 0 | 3 | 0 | – | | 9 | 0 |
| KR | 2003 | Úrvalsdeild | 15 | 0 | 3 | 0 | 5 | 0 | 1 | 0 | 24 | 0 |
| Víkingur R. | 2004 | Úrvalsdeild | 8 | 0 | 0 | 0 | 7 | 0 | – | | 15 | 0 |
| Career Total | | | 257 | 18 | 12 | 0 | 20 | 0 | 8 | 0 | 297 | 18 |

=== International ===
Appearances and goals by national team and year
| National team | Year | Apps | Goals |
|---|---|---|---|
| Iceland | 1993 | 1 | 0 |
| Iceland | 1994 | 10 | 0 |
| Iceland | 1995 | 3 | 0 |
| Iceland | 1996 | 4 | 0 |
| Iceland | 1997 | 3 | 0 |
| Iceland | 1999 | 1 | 0 |
| Total | | 22 | 0 |
