= Besta deild karla =

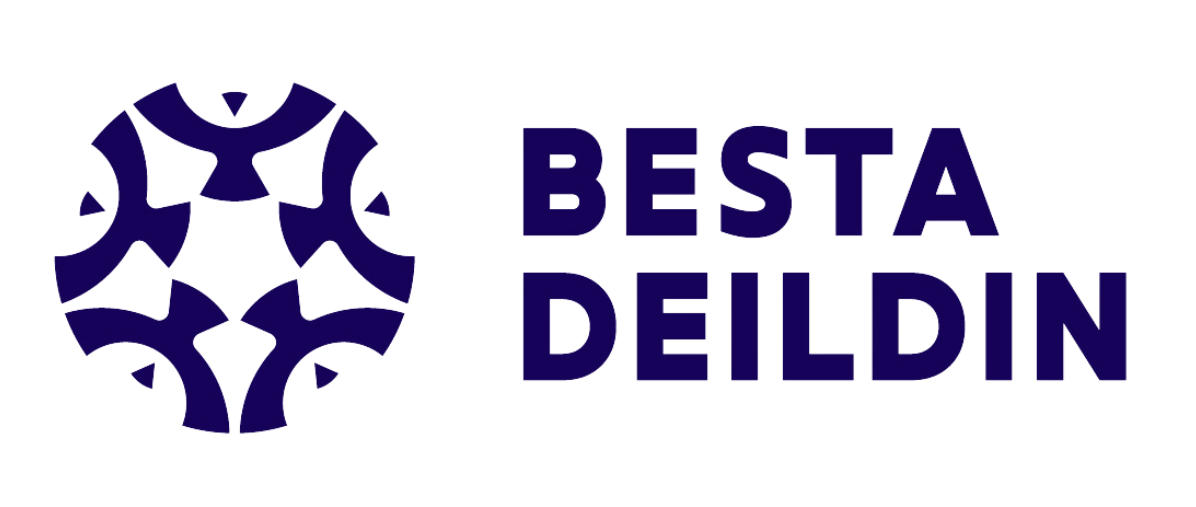
- Founded: 1912; 114 years ago
- Country: Iceland
- Confederation: UEFA
- Number of clubs: 12
- Level on pyramid: 1
- Relegation to: Lengjudeildin
- Domestic cup(s): Mjólkurbikarinn; League Cup; Super Cup
- International cup(s): UEFA Champions League; UEFA Europa League; UEFA Conference League
- Current champions: Víkingur (9th title) (2026)
- Most championships: KR (27)
- Top scorer: (Denmark) Patrick Pedersen (133 goals)
- Broadcasters: Domestic: Sýn Sport; International: Eleven Sports; OneFootball
- Website: ksi.is
- Current: 2026 Besta deild karla

The Besta deild karla (lit. 'Men's Best Division') is a professional association football league in Iceland and the highest level of the Icelandic football league system. The competition was founded in 1912 as the Icelandic Championship. Because of the harsh winters in Iceland, it is generally played in the spring and summer (April to September). It is governed by the Football Association of Iceland (KSÍ) and has 12 teams. By the end of the 2022–23 season, UEFA ranked the league No. 48 in Europe.

It was previously known as Úrvalsdeild karla.

From 27 April 2009 to 2022, the league had an active agreement on the league's name rights with Ölgerðin, the Icelandic franchisee for Pepsi. From the 2019 season to the end of the 2021 season, the league was popularly referred to as Pepsi Max deildin (The Pepsi Max League). On 24 February 2022, the league was rebranded as Besta deild karla.

The clubs play each other home and away. At the end of each season, the two teams with the fewest points are relegated to 1. deild karla (First Division), from which two top point teams promote to the higher tier. The winner of the league enters the European national competition UEFA Champions League in the second qualifying round. The second, third and fourth placed teams qualify for the UEFA Europa League in the first qualifying round.

An effort by KSÍ to strengthen Icelandic football had only one team relegated in the 2007 season to the First Division and three clubs promoted to the premier division, bringing the top flight to the number of clubs it contains currently.

Championship title counts are: KR with 27, Valur with 23, and ÍA and Fram Reykjavík each with 18. FH and Víkingur have 8, Keflavík has 4, IBV and Breiðablik have 3, and KA and Stjarnan with 1.

The current title holders are Víkingur who repeated as champions in 2026.

== Current clubs (2027) ==
Club	Location	Position in 2026	First season in Besta deild	Seasons in Besta deild	First season of current spell in Besta deild	Besta deild titles	First Besta deild title	Last Besta deild title
Afturelding	Mosfellsbær	1st (1. deild karla)	2025	2	2027	0	-	-
Breiðablik	Kópavogur	5th	1971	42	2006	3	2010	2024
FH	Hafnarfjörður	9th	1975	43	2001	8	2004	2016
Fram	Reykjavík (Grafarholt)	3rd	1912	104	2022	18	1913	1990
ÍA	Akranes	4th	1946	73	2024	18	1951	2001
Keflavík	Reykjanesbær (Keflavík)	6th	1958	47	2026	4	1964	1973
KR	Reykjavík (Vesturbær)	2nd	1912	113	1979	27	1912	2019
Stjarnan	Garðabær	7th	1990	25	2009	1	2014	2014
Valur	Reykjavík (Hlíðar/Miðborg)	8th	1915	107	2005	23	1930	2020
Víkingur	Reykjavík (Háaleiti og Bústaðir)	1st (champions)	1918	76	2014	9	1920	2026
Þór	Akureyri	10th	1989	10	2026	0	-	-
Þróttur R.	Reykjavík (Laugardalur)	2nd (1. deild karla)	1955	14	2027	0	-	-

== History ==
=== Championship history ===
The Icelandic league title has been won in its over 100 years existence by 11 teams. KR has the most titles, with 27. Stjarnan are the latest team to join the list, winning their first title in 2014.

The league has been dominated by teams from the Capital Region which contains nearly two thirds of Iceland's population. Only four teams from outside that region have ever won the league: Keflavík, ÍA, ÍBV, and KA. ÍBV (Vestmannaeyjar) and KA (Akureyri) have won four titles between them; these are the clubs farthest from the capital.

Single round

- 1912: KR (Reykjavík)
- 1913: Fram (Reykjavík)*
- 1914: Fram (Reykjavík)*
- 1915: Fram (Reykjavík)
- 1916: Fram (Reykjavík)
- 1917: Fram (Reykjavík)
- 1918: Fram (Reykjavík)
- 1919: KR (Reykjavík)
- 1920: Víkingur (Reykjavík)
- 1921: Fram (Reykjavík)
- 1922: Fram (Reykjavík)
- 1923: Fram (Reykjavík)
- 1924: Víkingur (Reykjavík)
- 1925: Fram (Reykjavík)
- 1926: KR (Reykjavík)
- 1927: KR (Reykjavík)
- 1928: KR (Reykjavík)
- 1929: KR (Reykjavík)
- 1930: Valur (Reykjavík)
- 1931: KR (Reykjavík)
- 1932: KR (Reykjavík)
- 1933: Valur (Reykjavík)
- 1934: KR (Reykjavík)
- 1935: Valur (Reykjavík)
- 1936: Valur (Reykjavík)
- 1937: Valur (Reykjavík)
- 1938: Valur (Reykjavík)
- 1939: Fram (Reykjavík)
- 1940: Valur (Reykjavík)
- 1941: KR (Reykjavík)
- 1942: Valur (Reykjavík)
- 1943: Valur (Reykjavík)
- 1944: Valur (Reykjavík)
- 1945: Valur (Reykjavík)
- 1946: Fram (Reykjavík)
- 1947: Fram (Reykjavík)
- 1948: KR (Reykjavík)
- 1949: KR (Reykjavík)
- 1950: KR (Reykjavík)
- 1951: ÍA (Akranes)
- 1952: KR (Reykjavík)
- 1953: ÍA (Akranes)
- 1954: ÍA (Akranes)
- 1955: KR (Reykjavík)
- 1956: Valur (Reykjavík)
- 1957: ÍA (Akranes)
- 1958: ÍA (Akranes)

Double round

- 1959: KR (Reykjavík)
- 1960: ÍA (Akranes)
- 1961: KR (Reykjavík)
- 1962: Fram (Reykjavík)
- 1963: KR (Reykjavík)
- 1964: Keflavík (Keflavík)
- 1965: KR (Reykjavík)
- 1966: Valur (Reykjavík)
- 1967: Valur (Reykjavík)
- 1968: KR (Reykjavík)
- 1969: Keflavík (Keflavík)
- 1970: ÍA (Akranes)
- 1971: Keflavík (Keflavík)
- 1972: Fram (Reykjavík)
- 1973: Keflavík (Keflavík)
- 1974: ÍA (Akranes)
- 1975: ÍA (Akranes)
- 1976: Valur (Reykjavík)
- 1977: ÍA (Akranes)
- 1978: Valur (Reykjavík)
- 1979: ÍBV (Vestmannaeyjar)
- 1980: Valur (Reykjavík)
- 1981: Víkingur (Reykjavík)
- 1982: Víkingur (Reykjavík)
- 1983: ÍA (Akranes)
- 1984: ÍA (Akranes)
- 1985: Valur (Reykjavík)
- 1986: Fram (Reykjavík)
- 1987: Valur (Reykjavík)
- 1988: Fram (Reykjavík)
- 1989: KA (Akureyri)
- 1990: Fram (Reykjavík)
- 1991: Víkingur (Reykjavík)
- 1992: ÍA (Akranes)
- 1993: ÍA (Akranes)
- 1994: ÍA (Akranes)
- 1995: ÍA (Akranes)
- 1996: ÍA (Akranes)
- 1997: ÍBV (Vestmannaeyjar)
- 1998: ÍBV (Vestmannaeyjar)
- 1999: KR (Reykjavík)
- 2000: KR (Reykjavík)
- 2001: ÍA (Akranes)
- 2002: KR (Reykjavík)
- 2003: KR (Reykjavík)
- 2004: FH (Hafnarfjörður)
- 2005: FH (Hafnarfjörður)
- 2006: FH (Hafnarfjörður)
- 2007: Valur (Reykjavík)
- 2008: FH (Hafnarfjörður)
- 2009: FH (Hafnarfjörður)
- 2010: Breiðablik (Kópavogur)
- 2011: KR (Reykjavík)
- 2012: FH (Hafnarfjörður)
- 2013: KR (Reykjavík)
- 2014: Stjarnan (Garðabær)
- 2015: FH (Hafnarfjörður)
- 2016: FH (Hafnarfjörður)
- 2017: Valur (Reykjavík)
- 2018: Valur (Reykjavík)
- 2019: KR (Reykjavík)
- 2020: Valur (Reykjavík)**
- 2021: Víkingur (Reykjavík)
- 2022: Breiðablik (Kópavogur)
- 2023: Víkingur (Reykjavík)
- 2024: Breiðablik (Kópavogur)
- 2025: Víkingur (Reykjavík)
- 2026: Víkingur (Reykjavík)

* There was no competition in 1913 and 1914, and Fram was awarded the title.
** In 2020 the competition was cut short due to the COVID-19 pandemic, and Valur was awarded the title because they were at the top of the table when the season ended.

== Champions by number of titles ==
Titles won by club (%)
1. KR – 27 23.9 (23.5%)
2. Valur - 23 20.3 (20.0%)
3. Fram - 18 15.9 (15.6%)
4. ÍA - 18 15.9 (15.6%)
5. Víkingur - 9 7.8 (7.68%)
6. FH - 8 7.1 (6.99%)
7. Keflavík - 4 3.5 (3.44%)
8. ÍBV - 3 2.7 (2.66%)
9. Breiðablik - 3 2.7 (2.66%)
10. KA - 1 0.9 (0.89%)
11. Stjarnan - 1 0.9 (0.89%)

Team	Titles	First title	Last title
KR	27	1912	2019
Valur	23	1930	2020
Fram	18	1913	1990
ÍA	18	1951	2001
Víkingur	9	1920	2026
FH	8	2004	2016
Keflavík	4	1964	1973
ÍBV	3	1979	1998
Breiðablik	3	2010	2024
KA	1	1989	1989
Stjarnan	1	2014	2014

Clubs in bold are currently playing in the top-tier.

== Season by season records ==
=== All-time top scorers ===
#	Top scorers name	Goals	Club	Last season
1.	(Denmark) Patrick Pedersen	**133**	Valur	2025
2.	(Iceland) Tryggvi Guðmundsson	**131**	ÍBV, KR, FH, Fylkir	2013
3.	(Iceland) Ingi Björn Albertsson	**126**	Valur, FH	1987

=== Top scorers ===
Season	Top scorer	Goals	Club
1980	(Iceland) Matthias Hallgrimsson	15	Valur
1981	(Iceland) Sigurlás Þorleifsson (Iceland) Larus Gudmundsson	12	ÍBV; Víkingur R.
1982	(Iceland) Sigurlás Þorleifsson (Iceland) Heimir Karlsson	10	ÍBV; Víkingur R.
1983	(Iceland) Ingi Björn Albertsson	14	Valur
1984	(Iceland) Guðmundur Steinsson	10	Fram
1985	(Iceland) Ómar Torfason	13	Fram
1986	(Iceland) Gudmundur Torfason	19	Fram
1987	(Iceland) Petur Ormslev	12	Fram
1988	(Iceland) Sigurjón Kristjánsson	13	Valur
1989	(Iceland) Hörður Magnússon	12	FH
1990	(Iceland) Hörður Magnússon	13	FH
1991	(Iceland) Hörður Magnússon (Iceland) Guðmundur Steinsson	13	FH; Víkingur R.
1992	(Iceland) Arnar Gunnlaugsson	15	ÍA
1993	(Iceland) Þórður Guðjónsson	19	ÍA
1994	(Serbia and Montenegro) Mihajlo Biberčić	14	ÍA
1995	(Iceland) Arnar Gunnlaugsson	15	ÍA
1996	(Iceland) Ríkharður Daðason	14	KR
1997	(Iceland) Tryggvi Guðmundsson	19	ÍBV
1998	(Iceland) Steingrímur Jóhannesson	16	ÍBV
1999	(Iceland) Steingrímur Jóhannesson	12	ÍBV
2000	(Iceland) Guðmundur Steinarsson (Iceland) Andri Sigþórsson	14	Keflavík; KR
2001	(Iceland) Hjörtur Hjartarson	15	ÍA
2002	(Iceland) Grétar Hjartarson	13	Grindavík
2003	(Iceland) Björgólfur Takefusa	10	Þróttur R.
2004	(Iceland) Gunnar Heiðar Þorvaldsson	12	ÍBV
2005	(Iceland) Tryggvi Guðmundsson	16	FH
2006	(Iceland) Marel Baldvinsson	11	Breiðablik
2007	(Iceland) Jónas Grani Garðarsson	13	Fram
2008	(Iceland) Guðmundur Steinarsson	16	Keflavík
2009	(Iceland) Björgólfur Takefusa	16	KR
2010	(Iceland) Atli Viðar Björnsson (Iceland) Alfreð Finnbogason (Gabon) Gilles Mbang Ondo	14	FH; Breiðablik; Grindavík
2011	(Iceland) Garðar Jóhannsson	15	Stjarnan
2012	(Iceland) Atli Guðnason	12	FH
2013	(Iceland) Atli Viðar Björnsson (Iceland) Viðar Örn Kjartansson (England) Gary Martin	13	FH; Fylkir; KR
2014	(England) Gary Martin	13	KR
2015	(Denmark) Patrick Pedersen	13	Valur
2016	(Iceland) Garðar Gunnlaugsson	14	ÍA
2017	(Iceland) Andri Rúnar Bjarnason	19	Grindavík
2018	(Denmark) Patrick Pedersen	17	Valur
2019	(England) Gary Martin	14	Valur/ÍBV
2020	(Scotland) Steven Lennon	17	FH
2021	(Denmark) Nikolaj Hansen	16	Víkingur R.
2022	(Iceland) Nökkvi Þeyr Þórisson (Iceland) Guðmundur Magnússon	17	KA; Fram
2023	(Iceland) Emil Atlason	17	Stjarnan
2024	(Iceland) Benoný Breki Andrésson	21	KR
2025	(Denmark) Patrick Pedersen	18	Valur

=== Player of the Year ===
Season	Player of the Year	Club
1984	(Iceland) Bjarni Sigurðsson	ÍA
1985	(Iceland) Guðmundur Þorbjörnsson	Valur
1986	(Iceland) Guðmundur Torfason	Fram
1987	(Iceland) Pétur Ormslev	Fram
1988	(Iceland) Sigurjón Kristjánsson	Valur
1989	(Iceland) Þorvaldur Örlygsson	KA
1990	(Iceland) Sævar Jónsson	Valur
1991	(Iceland) Guðmundur Steinsson	Víkingur R.
1992	(Iceland) Lúkas Kostic	ÍA
1993	(Iceland) Sigurður Jónsson	ÍA
1994	(Iceland) Sigursteinn Gíslason	ÍA
1995	(Iceland) Ólafur Þórðarson	ÍA
1996	(Iceland) Gunnar Oddsson	Leiftur
1997	(Iceland) Tryggvi Guðmundsson	ÍBV
1998	(Scotland) David Winnie	KR
1999	(Iceland) Guðmundur Benediktsson	KR
2000	(Iceland) Hlynur Stefánsson	ÍBV
2001	(Iceland) Gunnlaugur Jónsson	ÍA
2002	(Iceland) Finnur Kolbeinsson	Fylkir
2003	(Denmark) Allan Borgvardt	FH
2004	(Iceland) Heimir Guðjónsson	FH
2005	(Denmark) Allan Borgvardt	FH
2006	(Iceland) Viktor Bjarki Arnarsson	Víkingur R.
2007	(Iceland) Helgi Sigurðsson	Valur
2008	(Iceland) Guðmundur Steinarsson	Keflavík
2009	(Iceland) Atli Guðnason	FH
2010	(Iceland) Alfreð Finnbogason	Breiðablik
2011	(Iceland) Hannes Þór Halldórsson	KR
2012	(Iceland) Atli Guðnason	FH
2013	(Iceland) Björn Daníel Sverrisson	FH
2014	(Iceland) Ingvar Jónsson	Stjarnan
2015	(Iceland) Emil Pálsson	FH
2016	(Iceland) Kristinn Freyr Sigurðsson	Valur
2017	(Iceland) Andri Rúnar Bjarnason	Grindavík
2018	(Denmark) Patrick Pedersen	Valur
2019	(Iceland) Óskar Örn Hauksson	KR
2020	(Scotland) Steven Lennon	FH
2021	(Denmark) Nikolaj Hansen	Víkingur R.
2022	(Iceland) Nökkvi Þeyr Þórisson	KA
2023	(Iceland) Birnir Snær Ingason	Víkingur R.
2024	(Iceland) Höskuldur Gunnlaugsson	Breiðablik
2025	(Denmark) Patrick Pedersen	Valur

=== Young Player of the Year ===
Caps correct as of 5 August 2025

Season	Player	Club	International caps	International goals
1984	(Iceland) Guðni Bergsson	Valur	80	1
1985	(Iceland) Halldór Áskelsson	Þór Akureyri	24	4
1986	(Iceland) Gauti Laxdal	Fram	0	
1987	(Iceland) Rúnar Kristinsson	KR	104	3
1988	(Iceland) Arnljótur Davíðsson	Fram	3	0
1989	(Iceland) Ólafur Gottskálksson	ÍA	9	0
1990	(Iceland) Steinar Guðgeirsson	Fram	1	0
1991	(Iceland) Arnar Grétarsson	Breiðablik	71	2
1992	(Iceland) Arnar Gunnlaugsson	ÍA	32	3
1993	(Iceland) Þórður Guðjónsson	ÍA	58	13
1994	(Iceland) Eiður Guðjohnsen	Valur	88	26
1995	(Iceland) Tryggvi Guðmundsson	ÍBV	42	12
1996	(Iceland) Bjarni Guðjónsson	ÍA	23	1
1997	(Iceland) Sigurvin Ólafsson	ÍBV	7	0
1998	(Iceland) Ólafur Þór Gunnarsson	ÍR	1	0
1999	(Iceland) Grétar Hjartarson	Grindavík	1	0
2000	(Iceland) Helgi Valur Daníelsson	Fylkir	33	0
2001	(Iceland) Grétar Rafn Steinsson	ÍA	46	4
2002	(Iceland) Gunnar Heiðar Þorvaldsson	ÍBV	24	5
2003	(Iceland) Ólafur Ingi Skúlason	Fylkir	36	1
2004	(Iceland) Emil Hallfreðsson	FH	73	1
2005	(Iceland) Hörður Sveinsson	Keflavik	0	0
2006	(Iceland) Birkir Sævarsson	Valur	103	3
2007	(Iceland) Matthías Vilhjálmsson	FH	15	2
2008	(Iceland) Jóhann Berg Guðmundsson	Breiðablik	99	8
2009	(Iceland) Alfreð Finnbogason	Breiðablik	73	18
2010	(Iceland) Kristinn Steindórsson	Breiðablik	3	2
2011	(Iceland) Þórarinn Ingi Valdimarsson	ÍBV	4	0
2012	(Iceland) Jón Daði Böðvarsson	Selfoss	64	4
2013	(Iceland) Arnór Ingvi Traustason	Keflavík	67	6
2014	(Iceland) Elías Már Ómarsson	Keflavík	9	0
2015	(Iceland) Höskuldur Gunnlaugsson	Breiðablik	8	0
2016	(Iceland) Óttar Magnús Karlsson	Víkingur R.	11	2
2017	(Iceland) Alex Þór Hauksson	Stjarnan	4	0
2018	(Iceland) Willum Þór Willumsson	Breiðablik	18	0
2019	(Iceland) Finnur Tómas Pálmason	KR	1	0
2020	(Iceland) Valgeir Lunddal Friðriksson	Valur	16	0
2021	(Iceland) Kristall Máni Ingason	Víkingur R.	6	0
2022	(Iceland) Ísak Andri Sigurgeirsson	Stjarnan	0	0
2023	(Iceland) Eggert Aron Guðmundsson	Stjarnan	0	0
2024	(Iceland) Benoný Breki Andrésson	KR	0	0
2025	(Iceland) Guðmundur Balvin Nökkvason	Stjarnan	0	0

== Total seasons in Besta deild by club ==
A total of 32 teams have played at least one season in the top division. Teams in bold play in 2026 season.

Seasons counted up to and including the 2025 season.

Club	Location	First season in Besta deild	Last season in in Besta deild	Seasons in Besta deild	Best result in Besta deild	Besta deild titles	First Besta deild title	Last Besta deild title
Afturelding	Mosfellsbær	2025	2025	1	12th	0	-	-
**Breiðablik**	Kópavogur	1971	2026	40	1st	3	2010	2024
**FH** ^{2}	Hafnarfjörður	1975	2026	41	1st	8	2004	2016
Fjölnir	Reykjavík (Grafarvogur)	2008	2020	8	4th	0	-	-
**Fram**	Reykjavík (Grafarholt)	1912	2026	102	1st	18	1913	1990
Fylkir	Reykjavík (Árbær)	1989	2024	26	2nd	0	-	-
Grindavík	Grindavík	1995	2019	20	3rd	0	-	-
Grótta	Seltjarnarnes	2020	2020	1	11th	0	-	-
Haukar ^{2}	Hafnarfjörður	1979	2010	2	10th	0	-	-
HK	Kópavogur	2007	2024	7	9th	0	-	-
**ÍA**	Akranes	1946	2026	71	1st	18	1951	2001
ÍBA^{1}	Akureyri	1943	1974	17	3rd	0	-	-
ÍBH ^{2}	Hafnarfjörður	1957	1961	3	4th	0	-	-
ÍBÍ ^{3}	Ísafjörður	1962	1983	3	6th	0	-	-
**ÍBV**	Vestmannaeyjar	1912	2026	54	1st	3	1979	1998
ÍR	Reykjavík (Breiðholt)	1998	1998	1	10th	0	-	-
**KA** ^{1}	Akureyri	1929	2026	26	1st	1	1989	1989
**Keflavík**	Reykjanesbær (Keflavík)	1958	2026	55	1st	4	1964	1973
**KR**	Reykjavík (Vesturbær)	1912	2026	111	1st	27	1912	2019
Leiftur ^{4}	Ólafsfjörður	1988	2000	7	3rd	0	-	-
Leiknir	Reykjavík (Breiðholt)	2015	2022	3	8th	0	-	-
Selfoss	Selfoss	2010	2012	2	11th	0	-	-
Skallagrímur	Borgarnes	1997	1997	1	9th	0	-	-
**Stjarnan**	Garðabær	1990	2026	23	1st	1	2014	2014
**Valur**	Reykjavík (Hlíðar/Miðborg)	1915	2026	105	1st	23	1930	2020
Vestri ^{3}	Ísafjörður	2024	2025	2	10th	0	-	-
Víðir	Garður	1985	1991	4	7th	0	-	-
Víkingur	Ólafsvík	2013	2017	3	10th	0	-	-
**Víkingur**	Reykjavík (Fossvogur, Háaleiti og Bústaðir)	1918	2026	74	1st	8	1920	2025
Völsungur	Húsavík	1987	1988	2	8th	0	-	-
**Þór** ^{1}	Akureyri	1977	2026	17	3rd	0	-	-
Þróttur	Reykjavík (Laugardalur)	1953	2016	19	5th	0	-	-

^{1} ÍBA stood for "Sports Association of Akureyri", composed of KA and Þór. Disbanded after the 1974 season with KA and Þór fielding their own teams starting from the 1975 season.
^{2} ÍBH stood for "Sports Association of Hafnarfjörður", composed of FH and Haukar. Disbanded after the 1963 season with FH and Haukar fielding their own teams starting from the 1964 season.
^{3} ÍBÍ ran into financial trouble and folded after the 1987 season. Most of the players transferred to BÍ which took over as the main football club in Ísafjörður. BÍ is now known as Vestri.
^{4} Leiftur ran into financial trouble and eventually merged with KS from Siglufjörður before the 2006 season. The teams were disbanded before the 2010 season in favour of forming a new football club for both towns, the new club being called KF.

== See also ==
- Besta deild kvenna (Women's Premier League)
- List of football clubs in Iceland
- List of foreign Úrvalsdeild players
