= Þorvaldur Örlygsson =

Icelandic footballer and manager

11th Chairman of the Football Association of Iceland
- Incumbent
- Assumed office 2024
- Preceded by: Vanda Sigurgeirsdóttir

Personal details
- Born: Þorvaldur Örlygsson; 2 August 1966 (age 60) Odense, Denmark
Association football career
- Height: 1.80 m (5 ft 11 in)
- Position: Midfielder
Senior career*
Years	Team	Apps	(Gls)
1984–1989	KA	89	(20)
1988–1989	→ TuS Paderborn-Neuhaus (loan)	0	(0)
1989–1993	Nottingham Forest	37	(2)
1991	→ Fram (loan)	14	(3)
1993–1995	Stoke City	90	(16)
1995–1999	Oldham Athletic	76	(1)
2000–2003	KA	57	(6)
Total		363	(48)
International career
1987–1995	Iceland	41	(7)
Managerial career
- 2000–2005: KA Akureyri
- 2006–2007: Fjarðabyggð
- 2008–2013: Fram
- 2013: ÍA Akranes
- 2014–2015: HK Kopavogur
- 2015–2016: Keflavík
- 2015–2020: Iceland U-19
- 2021–2024: Stjarnan (co-manager)
- * Club domestic league appearances and goals

Þorvaldur "Toddy" Örlygsson (born 2 August 1966) is an Icelandic former footballer who played as a midfielder. After retiring, he has worked as a manager, with his most recent side being Icelandic club Keflavík. He is the younger brother of former international player Ormarr Örlygsson.

Þorvaldur started at Knattspyrnufélag Akureyrar and played most of his career in England, first in the Premier League for Nottingham Forest and later for First Division clubs Stoke City and Oldham Athletic before returning to Iceland.

On 24 February 2024, Þorvaldur was elected as chairman of the Football Association of Iceland.

== Career ==
"Toddy" arrived at Nottingham Forest in December 1989 for a fee of £175,000 from KA Akureyri after impressing Brian Clough. Þorvaldur took a while to make an impact and it was not until 1992 that he established himself in Forest's line-up. He played in 23 matches during the 1992–93, the first season of the Premier League which saw Forest suffer relegation. New manager Frank Clark decided to release Þorvaldur and in August 1993 he joined Stoke City on a free transfer.

He was signed by manager Lou Macari as a replacement for Kevin Russell. He soon made an impression on the supporters with a fine performance away at his former club Nottingham Forest. A number of fine goals earned him a great rapport with the supporters and he became a popular player at the Victoria Ground. He scored 11 goals in 58 appearances in 1993–94 and hit eight goals in 44 matches in 1994–95. However his relationship with the fans turned sour when he rejected a new contract offer in the summer of 1995 and consequently found himself out of the side and eventually signed for Oldham Athletic for a fee of £180,000 in December 1995. His career in England was cut short by injury in 1999 though he played again for three more years at his first club KA Akureyri as well as a year as player manager. He later became full-time manager of KA Akureyri. In the summers of 2006 and 2007 he managed Fjarðabyggð, during that time he played few games for the legendary team BN´96. In the year 2008 he was appointed manager of Fram. He spent five years with Fram before becoming manager of ÍA Akranes on 19 June 2013.

== International career ==
He made his debut for Iceland in 1987 and went on to win 41 caps, scoring 7 goals. He played his last international match in a November 1995 European Championship qualifying match against Hungary.

== Career statistics ==
=== Club ===
Appearances and goals by club, season and competition
Club	Season	League			FA Cup		League Cup		Other^{[A]}		Total	
Club	Season	Division	Apps	Goals	Apps	Goals	Apps	Goals	Apps	Goals	Apps	Goals
KA	1984	Úrvalsdeild karla	6	0	—		—		—		6	1
KA	1985	1. deild karla	15	0	—		—		—		15	0
KA	1986	1. deild karla	18	1	—		—		—		18	1
KA	1987	Úrvalsdeild	17	4	—		—		—		17	4
KA	1988	Úrvalsdeild	16	9	—		—		—		16	9
KA	1989	Úrvalsdeild	17	6	—		—		—		17	6
KA	Total		89	20	—		—		—		89	20
Nottingham Forest	1989–90	First Division	12	1	1	0	3	0	1	0	17	1
Nottingham Forest	1990–91	First Division	0	0	0	0	0	0	0	0	0	0
Nottingham Forest	1991–92	First Division	5	0	0	0	0	0	0	0	5	0
Nottingham Forest	1992–93	Premier League	20	1	0	0	3	2	0	0	23	3
Nottingham Forest	Total		37	2	1	0	6	2	1	0	45	4
Fram (loan)	1991	Úrvalsdeild	14	3	—		—		—		14	3
Stoke City	1993–94	First Division	45	9	4	1	4	0	5	1	58	11
Stoke City	1994–95	First Division	38	7	2	0	3	1	1	0	44	8
Stoke City	1995–96	First Division	7	0	0	0	0	0	2	0	9	0
Stoke City	Total		90	16	6	1	7	1	8	1	111	19
Oldham Athletic	1995–96	First Division	16	0	3	0	0	0	0	0	19	0
Oldham Athletic	1996–97	First Division	27	1	1	0	5	0	0	0	33	1
Oldham Athletic	1997–98	Second Division	11	0	0	0	1	0	0	0	12	0
Oldham Athletic	1998–99	Second Division	22	0	0	0	2	0	0	0	24	0
Oldham Athletic	Total		76	1	4	0	8	0	0	0	88	1
KA	2000	1. deild karla	17	0	—		—		—		17	0
KA	2001	1. deild karla	17	3	—		—		—		17	3
KA	2002	Úrvalsdeild	9	1	—		—		—		9	1
KA	2003	Úrvalsdeild	14	2	—		—		—		14	2
KA	Total		57	6	—		—		—		57	6
Career Total			363	48	11	1	21	3	9	1	404	53

A. The "Other" column constitutes appearances and goals in the Anglo-Italian Cup, Full Members Cup.

=== International ===
National team	Year	Apps	Goals
Iceland	1987	1	0
Iceland	1988	2	0
Iceland	1989	1	0
Iceland	1990	3	0
Iceland	1991	8	2
Iceland	1992	6	1
Iceland	1993	2	0
Iceland	1994	7	4
Iceland	1995	5	0
Total		35	7
