= James McCrae (footballer) =

Scottish footballer and manager

Personal information
- Full name: James Clark Fulton McCrae
- Date of birth: 2 September 1894
- Place of birth: Bridge of Weir, Scotland
- Date of death: 3 September 1974 (aged 80)
- Place of death: Paisley, Scotland
- Position: Left half

Youth career
- Port Glasgow Rangers

Senior career*
Years	Team	Apps	(Gls)
1912–1919	Clyde	27	(2)
1914–1918	→ Grenadier Guards (wartime)		
1916	→ Rangers (war guest)	3	(0)
1917	→ St Mirren (war guest)	1	(0)
- → West Ham United (war guest)
1919–1920	West Ham United	54	(3)
1920–1923	Bury	84	(10)
1923–1924	Wigan Borough	32	(6)
1924–1925	New Brighton	6	(0)
1925–1926	Manchester United	9	(0)
1926–1927	Watford	2	(0)
1927	→ Third Lanark (loan)		
1927–1928	Clyde	3	(0)
Total		221	(21)

Managerial career
- 1934–1936: Egypt
- 1941: İstanbulspor
- 1946–1948: Fram
- * Club domestic league appearances and goals

James Clark Fulton McCrae (also spelt McRae, McRea, McCray and McCabe; 2 September 1894 – 3 September 1974) was a Scottish football player and manager. His brother was Scottish international player David McCrae.

== Playing career ==
Born in Bridge of Weir, McCrae signed professional forms with Clyde in 1912, but his playing career was interrupted by the First World War. During the War, McCrae joined the Grenadier Guards, playing for their football team, as well as guesting for Clyde, Rangers, and West Ham United. McCrae joined West Ham United permanently in June 1919, playing in their first ever League game. McCrae also played for Bury, Wigan Borough, New Brighton, Manchester United and Watford. He made a total of 187 appearances in the Football League. McCrae later played in Scotland for Third Lanark and his first club, Clyde, before retiring in 1928.

== Coaching career ==
McCrae coached Egypt at the 1934 FIFA World Cup, and also managed İstanbulspor in Turkey and Fram of Iceland.

== Honours ==
Fran

- Icelandic League: 1946, 1947
