= Örlygsson =

Örlygsson is a surname. Notable people with the surname include:

- Gunnar Örn Örlygsson (born 1971), former Icelandic politician, former basketball player
- Örlygur Hnefill Örlygsson (born 1983), (Orly Orlyson), Icelandic filmmaker, hotelier, founder of The Exploration Museum
- Ormarr Örlygsson (born 1962), Icelandic former footballer
- Teitur Örlygsson (born 1967), Icelandic former professional basketball player and coach
- Þorvaldur Örlygsson (born 1966), Icelandic former footballer

== See also ==
- Þorláksson
- Olsson
