= Torfason =

Torfason is an Icelandic patronymic surname, literally meaning "son of Torfi". It may refer to:

- Guðmundur Torfason (born 1961), Icelandic footballer
- Hörður Torfason (born 1945), Icelandic songwriter and activist
- Mikael Torfason (born 1974), Icelandic writer
- Ómar Torfason (born 1959), Icelandic footballer
- Stefán Karel Torfason (born 1994), Icelandic strongman competitor and powerlifter
