= 1983 1. deild karla =

Icelandic football league season

The 1983 season of 1. deild karla was the 29th season of second-tier football in Iceland.

== League table ==
Pos	Team	Pld	W	D	L	GF	GA	GD	Pts	Promotion or relegation
1	Fram (C, P)	18	10	6	2	33	18	+15	26	Promoted to 1984 Úrvalsdeild
2	KA (P)	18	10	5	3	31	21	+10	25	Promoted to 1984 Úrvalsdeild
3	FH	18	6	8	4	28	23	+5	20	
4	Víðir	18	7	6	5	14	12	+2	20	
5	Völsungur	18	7	3	8	19	18	+1	17	
6	Njarðvík	18	7	3	8	18	18	0	17	
7	KS	18	5	7	6	16	18	−2	17	
8	Einherji	18	5	7	6	17	21	−4	17	
9	Fylkir (R)	18	3	5	10	15	25	−10	11	Relegated to 1984 2. deild
10	Reynir S. (R)	18	1	8	9	9	26	−17	10	Relegated to 1984 2. deild

Rules for classification: 1) points; 2) goal difference; 3) number of goals scored.
(C) Champions; (P) Promoted; (R) Relegated

== Top scorers ==
Scorer	Goals	Team
(Iceland) Guðmundur Torfason	11	Fram
(Iceland) Hinrik Þórhallsson	10	KA
(Iceland) Pálmi Jónsson	9	FH
(Iceland) Gunnar Gíslason	8	KA
(Iceland) Jónas Hallgrímsson	8	Völsungur
