= 1991 Úrvalsdeild =

Úrvalsdeild
- Season: 1991

Statistics of Úrvalsdeild in the 1991 season.

== Overview ==
It was contested by 10 teams, and Víkingur won the championship. Víkingur's Guðmundur Steinsson and FH's Hörður Magnússon were the joint top scorers with 13 goals.

== Final league table ==
Pos	Team	Pld	W	D	L	GF	GA	GD	Pts	Qualification or relegation
1	Víkingur (C)	18	12	1	5	36	21	+15	37	Qualification for the Champions League first round
2	Fram	18	11	4	3	29	15	+14	37	Qualification for the UEFA Cup first round
3	KR	18	8	4	6	34	18	+16	28	
4	Valur	18	8	2	8	30	24	+6	26	Qualification for the Cup Winners' Cup first round
5	Breiðablik	18	7	5	6	26	27	−1	26	
6	KA	18	7	4	7	21	23	−2	25	
7	ÍBV	18	7	3	8	28	36	−8	24	
8	FH	18	6	4	8	26	32	−6	22	
9	Stjarnan (R)	18	4	6	8	23	27	−4	18	Relegation to 1. deild karla
10	Víðir (R)	18	2	3	13	17	47	−30	9	Relegation to 1. deild karla

Source: RSSSF
Rules for classification: 1) points; 2) goal difference; 3) number of goals scored.
(C) Champions; (R) Relegated

== Results ==
Each team played every opponent once home and away for a total of 18 matches.

Home \ Away	BRE	FRA	FH	ÍBV	KA	KR	STJ	VAL	VÍÐ	VÍK
Breiðablik		1–1	1–0	2–1	2–0	1–1	0–2	2–3	0–0	1–2
Fram	3–3		2–1	3–0	2–1	1–0	1–0	0–1	4–0	0–2
FH	1–3	1–3		1–1	0–2	2–0	2–0	3–1	4–0	2–4
ÍBV	3–2	0–1	2–2		3–0	3–2	1–1	2–1	2–0	1–3
KA	3–1	1–1	2–1	2–3		3–2	1–0	1–0	1–1	0–1
KR	4–0	2–2	0–0	1–0	1–0		1–1	0–1	7–1	1–2
Stjarnan	0–1	1–0	2–2	3–2	1–1	0–1		0–3	1–1	3–4
Valur	2–2	0–1	8–1	1–2	3–1	0–3	2–2		0–2	1–0
Víðir	1–2	1–2	1–2	5–2	1–2	0–4	0–5	1–3		1–3
Víkingur	0–2	0–2	0–1	6–0	0–0	1–4	4–1	1–0	3–1	

Source: RSSSF
Legend: Blue = home team win; Yellow = draw; Red = away team win.

== Top goalscorers ==
Rank	Player	Club	Goals
1	(Iceland) Hörður Magnússon	FH	13
1	(Iceland) Guðmundur Steinsson	Víkingur	13
3	(Iceland) Leifur Geir Hafsteinsson	ÍBV	12
4	(Iceland) Jón Erling Ragnarsson	Fram	11
5	(Iceland) Atli Eðvaldsson	KR	10
6	(Iceland) Steindór Elíson	Breiðablik	9
7	(Iceland) Jón Grétar Jónsson	Valur	7
7	(Iceland) Ingólfur Ingólfsson	Stjarnan	7
7	(Czechoslovakia) Pavel Vandas	KA	7

Source: RSSSF
