= Halldór Áskelsson =

Icelandic footballer (born 1965)

Personal information
- Full name: Halldór Omar Áskelsson
- Date of birth: 20 April 1965 (age 61)
- Position: Striker

Senior career*
Years	Team	Apps	(Gls)
1983–1988	Þór		
1989–1990	Valur	22	(2)
1991–1998	Þór		
1999	UMFS Dalvík	6	(0)
2000–2002	Þór		

International career
	Iceland U18	2	(0)
	Iceland U21	6	(1)
1984–1989	Iceland	12	(4)

Managerial career
- Þór (assistant)
- * Club domestic league appearances and goals

Halldór Áskelsson (born 18 October 1965) is an Icelandic retired footballer who played as a forward. He was capped for Iceland and spent most of his career in Þór.

He played for Iceland U18 and Iceland U21. He made his debut for Iceland in 1984, playing twice against non-FIFA members Faroe Islands and Greenland. His real debut came in 1985 against Kuwait; he would score three goals gainst Kuwaut and Bahrain in 1986 and 1987. Later international matches included two additional non-FIFA matches, against Sweden Olympic and England B. In his last international match, Halldór Áskelsson scored against the Soviet Union away on Luzhniki Stadium, capturing a 1–1 draw, which was considered very strong for Iceland at the time.

Scoring 9 league goals in 1985, 5 of them came in the same match against FH. He played three periods for Þór, but won his only domestic trophy, the 1990 cup, with Valur.

He was later assistant manager of Þór.
