= 1934 Úrvalsdeild =

Úrvalsdeild
- Season: 1934

Statistics of Úrvalsdeild in the 1934 season.

== Overview ==
It was contested by 5 teams, and KR won the championship.

== Final league table ==
Pos	Team	Pld	W	D	L	GF	GA	GD	Pts
1	KR (C)	4	3	1	0	17	3	+14	7
2	Valur	4	3	0	1	22	5	+17	6
3	Fram	4	2	1	1	11	5	+6	5
4	ÍBV	4	1	0	3	5	15	−10	2
5	Víkingur	4	0	0	4	4	25	−21	0

Source: rsssf.com
Rules for classification: 1) points; 2) goal difference; 3) number of goals scored.
(C) Champions

== Results ==
Home \ Away	FRA	KR	VAL	VÍK	ÍBV
Fram		1–1	1–2	6–1	3–1
KR			3–2	3–1	5–1
Valur				13–1	6–0
Víkingur					1–3
ÍBV					
