= 1950 Úrvalsdeild =

Úrvalsdeild
- Season: 1950

Statistics of Úrvalsdeild in the 1950 season.

== Overview ==
It was contested by 5 teams, and KR won the championship. Fram's Ríkharður Jónsson and Lárus Hallbjörnsson, as well as ÍA's Þórður Þórðarson, Valur's Halldór Halldórsson and Víkingur's Gunnlaugur Lárusson, were the joint top scorers with 3 goals.

== Teams ==
| Team | Home city | Position in 1949 |
|---|---|---|
| Fram | Reykjavík | 2nd |
| Valur | Reykjavík | 3rd |
| ÍA | Akranes | 5th |
| Víkingur | Reykjavík | 4th |
| KR | Reykjavík | 1st |

== Final league table ==
| Pos | Team | Pld | W | D | L | GF | GA | GD | Pts |
|---|---|---|---|---|---|---|---|---|---|
| 1 | KR (C) | 4 | 2 | 2 | 0 | 7 | 3 | +4 | 6 |
| 2 | Fram | 4 | 2 | 1 | 1 | 8 | 4 | +4 | 5 |
| 3 | ÍA | 4 | 0 | 3 | 1 | 6 | 7 | −1 | 3 |
| 4 | Víkingur | 4 | 1 | 1 | 2 | 8 | 11 | −3 | 3 |
| 5 | Valur | 5 | 1 | 1 | 3 | 5 | 9 | −4 | 3 |

Source: icelandfootball.net and rsssf.com
Rules for classification: 1) points; 2) goal difference; 3) number of goals scored.
(C) Champions

== Results ==
| Home \ Away | FRA | KR | VAL | VÍK | ÍA |
|---|---|---|---|---|---|
| Fram | | 0–1 | 4–1 | 4–2 | 0–0 |
| KR | | | 3–0 | 2–2 | 1–1 |
| Valur | | | | 2–0 | 2–2 |
| Víkingur | | | | | 4–3 |
| ÍA | | | | | |
