= 1986 Úrvalsdeild =

Úrvalsdeild
- Season: 1986

Statistics of the Úrvalsdeild league for the 1986 season are as follows:

== Overview ==
It was contested by 10 teams, and Fram won the championship. Fram's Guðmundur Torfason was the top scorer with 19 goals

== Final league table ==
Pos	Team	Pld	W	D	L	GF	GA	GD	Pts	Qualification or relegation
1	Fram (C)	18	11	5	2	39	13	+26	38	Qualification for the European Cup first round
2	Valur	18	12	2	4	31	11	+20	38	Qualification for the UEFA Cup first round
3	ÍA	18	9	3	6	33	22	+11	30	Qualification for the Cup Winners' Cup first round
4	KR	18	7	8	3	21	10	+11	29	
5	Keflavík	18	9	1	8	25	27	−2	28	
6	Þór	18	6	4	8	21	31	−10	22	
7	Víðir	18	5	4	9	21	25	−4	19	
8	FH	18	5	4	9	24	36	−12	19	
9	Breiðablik (R)	18	4	4	10	18	35	−17	16	Relegation to 1. deild karla
10	ÍBV (R)	18	3	3	12	20	43	−23	12	Relegation to 1. deild karla

Rules for classification: 1) points; 2) goal difference; 3) number of goals scored.
(C) Champions; (R) Relegated

== Results ==
Each team played every opponent once home and away for a total of 18 matches.

Home \ Away	BRE	FH	FRA	ÍA	ÍBV	ÍBK	KR	VAL	VÍÐ	ÞÓR
Breiðablik		2–1	0–1	1–4	2–2	1–0	1–2	0–7	0–1	3–0
FH	2–2		1–6	1–4	4–1	2–1	0–0	0–1	2–1	1–0
Fram	2–1	2–2		3–1	3–0	0–1	2–1	0–1	4–1	2–1
ÍA	2–1	1–0	0–0		1–0	1–2	0–2	2–3	0–1	5–1
ÍBV	1–1	3–1	1–5	0–3		1–4	1–1	0–1	3–2	1–2
Keflavík	1–0	3–2	1–1	2–3	1–0		2–1	0–4	2–1	2–3
KR	3–1	1–1	0–0	1–1	4–0	1–0		0–0	0–1	0–0
Valur	0–1	5–0	1–1	1–0	3–1	0–1	0–3		1–0	1–0
Víðir	5–0	1–3	0–4	2–2	1–2	3–0 (Note: Keflavík fielded an unauthorized player, and as a result, the match was verified in favor of the opponents with a change in the score from 0–1 to 3–0.)	0–0	0–1		0–0
Þór	1–1	2–1	0–3	1–3	4–3	3–2	0–1	2–1	1–1	

Legend: Blue = home team win; Yellow = draw; Red = away team win.
