= 1943 Úrvalsdeild =

Úrvalsdeild
- Season: 1943

Statistics of Úrvalsdeild in the 1943 season.

== Overview ==
It was contested by 5 teams, and Valur won the championship. KR's Jón Jónasson was the top scorer with 5 goals.

== Final league table ==
Pos	Team	Pld	W	D	L	GF	GA	GD	Pts
1	Valur (C)	4	4	0	0	12	4	+8	8
2	KR	4	2	0	2	11	9	+2	4
3	Fram	4	2	0	2	10	9	+1	4
4	ÍBA	4	1	1	2	8	9	−1	3
5	ÍBV	4	0	1	3	5	15	−10	1

Source: rsssf.com
Rules for classification: 1) points; 2) goal difference; 3) number of goals scored.
(C) Champions

== Results ==
Home \ Away	VAL	KR	FRA	ÍBA	ÍBV
Valur		2–1	3–1	2–1	5–1
KR			3–1	1–4	6–2
Fram				5–2	3–0
ÍBA					1–1
ÍBV					
