= 1930 Úrvalsdeild =

Úrvalsdeild
- Season: 1930

Statistics of Úrvalsdeild in the 1930 season.

== Overview ==
ÍBA did not enter in 1930 so the number of teams dropped to five again. Valur won the club's first championship.

== Final league table ==
Pos	Team	Pld	W	D	L	GF	GA	GD	Pts
1	Valur (C)	4	4	0	0	18	2	+16	8
2	KR	4	3	0	1	14	4	+10	6
3	ÍBV	4	2	0	2	11	10	+1	4
4	Víkingur	4	0	1	3	3	13	−10	1
5	Fram	4	0	1	3	2	19	−17	1

Source: rsssf.com
Rules for classification: 1) points; 2) goal difference; 3) number of goals scored.
(C) Champions

== Results ==
Home \ Away	FRA	KR	VAL	VÍK	ÍBV
Fram		0–5	0–8	1–1	1–5
KR			1–2	4–0	4–2
Valur				5–0	3–1
Víkingur					2–3
ÍBA					
