= 1990 Úrvalsdeild =

Úrvalsdeild
- Season: 1990

Statistics of Úrvalsdeild in the 1990 season.

== Overview ==
It was contested by 10 teams, and Fram won the championship. FH's Hörður Magnússon was the top scorer with 13 goals.

== Final league table ==
Pos	Team	Pld	W	D	L	GF	GA	GD	Pts	Qualification
1	Fram (C)	18	12	2	4	39	16	+23	38	Qualification for the European Cup first round
2	KR	18	12	2	4	31	17	+14	38	Qualification for the UEFA Cup first round
3	ÍBV	18	11	4	3	39	32	+7	37	
4	Valur	18	10	3	5	29	21	+8	33	Qualification for the Cup Winners' Cup first round
5	Stjarnan	18	8	2	8	25	27	−2	26	
6	FH	18	7	2	9	24	29	−5	23	
7	Víkingur	18	4	7	7	17	24	−7	19	
8	KA	18	5	1	12	18	28	−10	16	
9	Þór (R)	18	4	3	11	13	24	−11	15	Relegation to 1. deild karla
10	ÍA (R)	18	3	2	13	19	36	−17	11	Relegation to 1. deild karla

Source: RSSSF
Rules for classification: 1) points; 2) goal difference; 3) number of goals scored.
(C) Champions; (R) Relegated

== Results ==
Each team played every opponent once home and away for a total of 18 matches.

Home \ Away	FRA	FH	ÍA	ÍBV	KA	KR	STJ	VAL	VÍK	ÞÓR
Fram		2–2	4–0	3–4	4–0	3–0	1–3	3–2	0–1	1–0
FH	2–1		2–1	1–2	1–0	1–3	5–1	0–1	1–1	0–1
ÍA	0–2	2–3		3–4	2–1	1–3	0–0	2–3	0–2	3–1
ÍBV	0–4	2–1	2–1		4–2	2–2	4–3	2–4	2–2	2–0
KA	0–1	4–0	2–1	1–1		0–1	0–3	0–1	2–0	1–2
KR	0–1	3–2	2–0	0–1	2–0		1–0	3–0	2–1	2–0
Stjarnan	1–6	0–1	2–0	1–1	1–3	1–3		2–1	1–0	3–0
Valur	1–2	2–0	1–0	4–1	2–0	2–1	0–1		1–1	0–0
Víkingur	0–1	2–0	2–2	0–4	0–1	1–1	1–0	2–2		0–0
Þór	0–0	1–2	0–1	0–1	2–1	1–2	0–2	1–2	4–1	

Source: RSSSF
Legend: Blue = home team win; Yellow = draw; Red = away team win.

== Top goalscorers ==
Rank	Player	Club	Goals
1	(Iceland) Hörður Magnússon	FH	13
2	(Iceland) Guðmundur Steinsson	Fram	10
2	(Iceland) Ragnar Margeirsson	KR	10
4	(Iceland) Hlynur Stefánsson	ÍBV	9
5	(Iceland) Anthony Karl Gregory	Valur	8
5	(Iceland) Tómas Ingi Tómasson	ÍBV	8
5	(Iceland) Jón Erling Ragnarsson	Fram	8
8	(Iceland) Kjartan Einarsson	KA	7

Source: RSSSF
