= 1988 Úrvalsdeild =

Úrvalsdeild
- Season: 1988

Statistics of Úrvalsdeild in the 1988 season.

== Overview ==
It was contested by 10 teams, and Fram won the championship. Valur's Sigurjón Kristjánsson was the top scorer with 13 goals.

== Final league table ==
Pos	Team	Pld	W	D	L	GF	GA	GD	Pts	Qualification or relegation
1	Fram (C)	18	16	1	1	38	8	+30	49	Qualification for the European Cup first round
2	Valur	18	13	2	3	36	15	+21	41	Qualification for the Cup Winners' Cup first round
3	ÍA	18	9	5	4	32	25	+7	32	Qualification for the UEFA Cup first round
4	KA	18	8	3	7	31	29	+2	27	
5	KR	18	7	3	8	26	25	+1	24	
6	Þór	18	6	6	6	25	28	−3	24	
7	Víkingur	18	5	3	10	20	31	−11	18	
8	Keflavík	18	4	6	8	22	32	−10	18	
9	Leiftur (R)	18	1	6	11	12	26	−14	9	Relegation to 1. deild karla
10	Völsungur (R)	18	2	3	13	13	36	−23	9	Relegation to 1. deild karla

Source: RSSSF
Rules for classification: 1) points; 2) goal difference; 3) number of goals scored.
(C) Champions; (R) Relegated

== Results ==
Each team played every opponent once home and away for a total of 18 matches.

Home \ Away	FRA	ÍA	KA	ÍBK	KR	LEI	VAL	VÍK	VÖL	ÞÓR
Fram		3–2	3–2	2–0	3–0	2–0	1–0	3–0	2–0	1–0
ÍA	0–4		2–2	2–0	2–0	3–1	1–0	4–0	2–1	4–3
KA	1–4	3–2		2–1	3–1	2–1	0–1	2–1	1–0	1–1
Keflavík	1–1	1–1	1–1		1–3	2–1	1–3	3–1	3–1	1–1
KR	1–2	1–1	2–0	3–0		2–1	0–1	2–2	3–0	1–2
Leiftur	0–3	0–0	2–1	1–1	1–1		0–0	0–1	0–1	1–1
Valur	0–1	3–1	4–3	3–1	3–2	1–0		4–0	3–1	4–2
Víkingur	0–2	1–2	0–1	3–1	0–1	2–1	0–0		5–2	3–1
Völsungur	1–0	1–2	0–4	1–2	1–3	1–1	1–3	0–0		0–0
Þór	0–1	1–1	3–2	2–2	2–0	2–1	0–3	2–1	2–1	

Source: RSSSF
Legend: Blue = home team win; Yellow = draw; Red = away team win.

== Top goalscorers ==
Rank	Player	Club	Goals
1	(Iceland) Sigurjón Kristjánsson	Valur	13
2	(Iceland) Guðmundur Steinsson	Fram	12
3	(Iceland) Aðalsteinn Víglundsson	ÍA	9
3	(Iceland) Þorvaldur Örlygsson	KA	9
5	(Iceland) Pétur Ormslev	Fram	8
6	(Iceland) Halldór Áskelsson	Þór	7
6	(Iceland) Sæbjörn Guðmundsson	KR	7
8	(Iceland) Julius Tryggvason	Þór	6
8	(Iceland) Arnljótur Davíðsson	Fram	6
8	(Iceland) Steinar Ingimundarson	Leiftur	6

Source: RSSSF
