= 1920 Úrvalsdeild =

Season of football in Iceland

Úrvalsdeild
- Season: 1920

The 1920 Úrvalsdeild is a season of top-flight Icelandic football.

== Overview ==
It was contested by 3 teams, and Víkingur won the championship.

== Final league table ==
Pos	Team	Pld	W	D	L	GF	GA	GD	Pts
1	Víkingur (C)	2	2	0	0	9	5	+4	4
2	KR	2	1	0	1	5	5	0	2
3	Fram	2	0	0	2	3	7	−4	0

Source: rsssf.com
Rules for classification: 1) points; 2) goal difference; 3) number of goals scored.
(C) Champions

== Results ==
Home \ Away	FRA	VÍK	KR
Fram		3–4	0–3
Víkingur			5–2
KR			
