= Jón Erling Ragnarsson =

Icelandic footballer (born 1964)

Personal information
- Date of birth: 18 May 1964 (age 62)
- Position: Forward

Senior career*
Years	Team	Apps	(Gls)
1982–1985	FH		
1986	Viking	0	(0)
1987–1989	FH	14	(2)
1990–1992	Fram	48	(22)
1993–1995	FH	49	(13)
- * Club domestic league appearances and goals

Jón Erling Ragnarsson (born 18 May 1964) is an Icelandic retired football striker. He also won league titles as a handball player with FH.

Jón Erling joined Norwegian side Viking in 1986 but never played an official match for them.

== Honours ==
- Icelandic League (1):
  - 1990
