= Ellert Sölvason =

Icelandic footballer (1917–2002)

Personal information
- Full name: Ellert D. Sölvason
- Date of birth: 17 December 1917
- Place of birth: Reyðarfjörður, Iceland
- Date of death: 8 March 2002 (aged 84)

Senior career*
Years	Team	Apps	(Gls)
1942	Valur		

International career
1946–1949	Iceland	4	(0)
- * Club domestic league appearances and goals

Ellert D. Sölvason (17 December 1917 – 8 March 2002) was an Icelandic footballer who played as a forward. He was part of the Iceland national team between 1946 and 1949 playing four matches. At club level he played for Valur and was the top scorer of the 1942 Úrvalsdeild with six goals.

== See also ==
- List of Iceland international footballers
