= 1942 Úrvalsdeild =

Úrvalsdeild
- Season: 1942

Statistics of Úrvalsdeild in the 1942 season.

== Overview ==
It was contested by 5 teams, and Valur won the championship. Valur's Ellert Sölvason was the top scorer with 6 goals.

== Final league table ==
Pos	Team	Pld	W	D	L	GF	GA	GD	Pts
1	Valur (C)	4	3	0	1	11	5	+6	6
2	Fram	4	3	0	1	7	7	0	6
3	KR	4	2	0	2	7	6	+1	4
4	Víkingur	4	1	0	3	3	6	−3	2
5	ÍBV	4	1	0	3	4	9	−5	2

Source: rsssf.com
Rules for classification: 1) points; 2) goal difference; 3) number of goals scored.
(C) Champions

== Results ==
Home \ Away	FRA	VÍK	VAL	KR	ÍBV
Fram		3–0	0–6	2–1	2–0
Víkingur			0–1	2–0	1–2
Valur				1–4	4–1
KR					2–1
ÍBV					
