= 1931 Úrvalsdeild =

Úrvalsdeild
- Season: 1931

Statistics of Úrvalsdeild in the 1931 season.

== Overview ==
Four teams participated in the 20th season of Icelandic league football. KR won the championship for the 7th time.

== Final league table ==
Pos	Team	Pld	W	D	L	GF	GA	GD	Pts
1	KR (C)	3	3	0	0	13	1	+12	6
2	Valur	3	2	0	1	6	3	+3	4
3	Víkingur	3	1	0	2	4	11	−7	2
4	Fram	3	0	0	3	3	11	−8	0

Source: rsssf.com
Rules for classification: 1) points; 2) goal difference; 3) number of goals scored.
(C) Champions

== Results ==
Home \ Away	FRA	KR	VAL	VÍK
Fram		1–5	1–2	1–4
KR			2–0	6–0
Valur				4–0
Víkingur				
