= Dóra Takefusa =

Icelandic actress

- Born: 8 January 1971 (age 55); Reykjavík, Iceland
- Occupations: Actress, TV presenter and producer
- Relatives: Björgólfur Takefusa (brother)

Dóra Takefusa (born 8 January 1971) is an Icelandic actress, television presenter and producer. She is known for her film roles and later as a TV presenter on SkjárEinn. She is the half-sister of former footballer Björgólfur Takefusa.

== Early life ==
Dóra was born in Reykjavík, Iceland, to an Icelandic mother and a Japanese father. She grew up in Seyðisfjörður before moving back to Reykjavík as a teenager.
