= 1932 Úrvalsdeild =

Úrvalsdeild
- Season: 1932

The 1932 Úrvalsdeild was contested by 5 teams, and KR won the championship.

== Final league table ==
Pos	Team	Pld	W	D	L	GF	GA	GD	Pts
1	KR (C)	4	3	1	0	15	5	+10	7
2	Valur	4	2	1	1	5	3	+2	5
3	KA	4	2	0	2	6	5	+1	4
4	Fram	4	2	0	2	3	5	−2	4
5	Víkingur	4	0	0	4	1	12	−11	0

Source: rsssf.com
Rules for classification: 1) points; 2) goal difference; 3) number of goals scored.
(C) Champions

== Results ==
Home \ Away	FRA	KR	VAL	VÍK	KA
Fram		1–3	1–0	1–0	0–2
KR			2–2	6–1	4–1
Valur				2–0	1–0
Víkingur					0–3
KA					
