= Ómar Torfason =

Icelandic footballer

Personal information
- Date of birth: 1 February 1959
- Place of birth: Ísafjörður, Iceland
- Position: Midfielder

Senior career*
Years	Team	Apps	(Gls)
1977–1978	ÍBÍ		
1979–1984	Víkingur		
1985	Fram	18	(13)
1985–1987	FC Luzern		
1987–1988	FC Olten		
1988–1989	Fram	25	(5)
1990–1991	Leiftur Ólafsfirði		
1993	Grindavík	9	(1)

International career
1975	Iceland U17	3	(0)
1981–1989	Iceland	39	(1)

Managerial career
- 1990–1991: Leiftur Ólafsfirði
- 1992: Fram (assistant)
- 1993: Grindavík
- 1996: BÍ 88
- 1997: Þór Akureyri
- * Club domestic league appearances and goals

Ómar Torfason (born 1 February 1959) is an Icelandic former professional footballer. He was part of the Icelandic men's national football team between 1981 and 1989. He played 39 matches, scoring 1 goal. He won the Icelandic championship three times, in 1981 and 1982 with Víkingur, and in 1988 with Fram. He won the Icelandic Cup with Fram in 1985 and 1989. In 1985 he was the Úrvalsdeild top scorer with 13 goals.

== Football ==
=== Honours ===
- Icelandic Championships: 3

1981, 1982, 1988

- Icelandic Cup: 2

1985, 1989

== Basketball ==
Ómar played basketball for KFÍ in the Icelandic second-tier league in the late 1970s alongside future national team player and track and field star Jón Oddsson. In September 1979, Ómar joined Úrvalsdeild karla club Valur but did not appear in any league games with them.

== See also ==
- List of Iceland international footballers
