= 1941 Úrvalsdeild =

Úrvalsdeild
- Season: 1941

Statistics of Úrvalsdeild in the 1941 season.

== Overview ==
It was contested by 5 teams, and KR won the championship. KR's Björgvin Schram was the top scorer with 7 goals.

== Final league table ==
Pos	Team	Pld	W	D	L	GF	GA	GD	Pts
1	KR (C)	4	3	1	0	11	5	+6	7
2	Valur	4	2	2	0	14	3	+11	6
3	Víkingur	4	1	1	2	5	5	0	3
4	Fram	4	1	1	2	6	12	−6	3
5	KA	4	0	1	3	6	17	−11	1

Source: rsssf.com
Rules for classification: 1) points; 2) goal difference; 3) number of goals scored.
(C) Champions

== Results ==
Home \ Away	FRA	VÍK	VAL	KR	KA
Fram		2–0	0–5	2–5	2–2
Víkingur			0–0	1–2	4–1
Valur				1–1	8–2
KR					3–1
KA					
