= 1939 Úrvalsdeild =

Úrvalsdeild
- Season: 1939

Statistics of Úrvalsdeild in the 1939 season.

== Overview ==
It was contested by 4 teams, and Fram won the championship. KR's Birgir Guðjónsson and Þorsteinn Einarsson were the joint top scorers with 3 goals.

== Final league table ==
Pos	Team	Pld	W	D	L	GF	GA	GD	Pts
1	Fram (C)	3	2	0	1	5	6	−1	4
2	KR	3	1	1	1	7	5	+2	3
3	Víkingur	3	1	1	1	3	3	0	3
4	Valur	3	0	2	1	3	4	−1	2

Source: rsssf.com
Rules for classification: 1) points; 2) goal difference; 3) number of goals scored.
(C) Champions

== Results ==
Home \ Away	FRA	VÍK	VAL	KR
Fram		2–1	1–0	2–5
Víkingur			1–1	1–0
Valur				2–2
KR				
