= 1912 Úrvalsdeild =

Úrvalsdeild
- Season: 1912
- Champions: KR (1st Icelandic title)
- Matches played: 3
- Goals scored: 5 (1.67 per match)

The 1912 season of Úrvalsdeild was the first season of league football in Iceland. KR won the first ever title. No teams were relegated as there were only three registered at that time. ÍBV Vestmannaeyjar withdrew after 1 match.

== Final league table ==
Pos	Team	Pld	W	D	L	GF	GA	GD	Pts
1	KR (C)	2	1	1	0	4	1	+3	3
2	Fram	2	1	1	0	1	1	0	3
3	ÍBV	1	0	0	1	0	3	−3	0

Source: rsssf.com
Rules for classification: 1) points; 2) goal difference; 3) number of goals scored.
(C) Champions

== Results ==
Home \ Away	FRA	ÍBV	KR
Fram		– (Note: ÍBV had to give up the game against Fram because they only had 7 capable players after the game against KR.)	1–1
ÍBV			0–3
KR			

== Championship play-off ==
2 July 1912
21:00 GMT

KR	3–2	Fram
Konráðsson; Einarsson; Þórðarson	Report	Thorarensen; Thorsteinsson

Íþróttavöllurinn á Melunum, Reykjavík
Attendance: c.500
Referee: Ólafur Rósenkranz
