= 1951 Úrvalsdeild =

Úrvalsdeild
- Season: 1951

The 1951 Úrvalsdeild was the 40th season of the highest association football league in Iceland.

== Overview ==
It was contested by 5 teams, and ÍA won the championship. ÍA's Ríkharður Jónsson was the top scorer with 7 goals.

== Final league table ==
Pos	Team	Pld	W	D	L	GF	GA	GD	Pts
1	ÍA (C)	4	2	2	0	12	8	+4	6
2	Valur	4	2	0	2	9	6	+3	4
3	KR	4	2	0	2	8	8	0	4
4	Víkingur	4	1	1	2	7	6	+1	3
5	Fram	4	1	1	2	5	13	−8	3

Source: rsssf.com
Rules for classification: 1) points; 2) goal difference; 3) number of goals scored.
(C) Champions

== Results ==
Home \ Away	FRA	KR	VAL	VÍK	ÍA
Fram		2–1	1–6	0–4	2–2
KR			2–0	3–1	2–5
Valur				1–0	2–3
Víkingur					2–2
ÍA					
