= 2003 Úrvalsdeild =

Úrvalsdeild
- Season: 2003

Statistics of Úrvalsdeild in the 2003 season.

== Overview ==
It was contested by 10 teams, and KR won the championship. Þróttur's Björgólfur Takefusa was the top scorer with 10 goals.

== Final league table ==
Pos	Team	Pld	W	D	L	GF	GA	GD	Pts	Qualification or relegation
1	KR (C)	18	10	3	5	28	27	+1	33	Qualification for the Champions League first qualifying round
2	FH	18	9	3	6	36	24	+12	30	Qualification for the UEFA Cup first qualifying round
3	ÍA	18	8	6	4	27	21	+6	30	Qualification for the UEFA Cup first qualifying round
4	Fylkir	18	9	2	7	29	24	+5	29	Qualification for the Intertoto Cup first round
5	ÍBV	18	7	3	8	25	25	0	24	
6	Grindavík	18	7	2	9	24	31	−7	23	
7	Fram	18	7	2	9	22	30	−8	23	
8	KA	18	6	4	8	29	27	+2	22	
9	Þróttur (R)	18	7	1	10	27	29	−2	22	Relegation to 1. deild karla
10	Valur (R)	18	6	2	10	24	33	−9	20	Relegation to 1. deild karla

Source: RSSSF
Rules for classification: 1) points; 2) goal difference; 3) number of goals scored.
(C) Champions; (R) Relegated

== Results ==
Each team played every opponent once home and away for a total of 18 matches.

Home \ Away	FH	FRA	FYL	GRI	ÍA	ÍBV	KA	KR	VAL	ÞRÓ
FH		2–3	1–2	2–1	1–1	2–1	3–2	7–0	4–0	1–4
Fram	1–0		1–2	2–0	0–0	2–1	2–3	1–1	2–1	1–0
Fylkir	3–0	3–1		2–0	0–1	3–0	1–0	2–1	6–2	1–5
Grindavík	1–3	3–2	1–1		3–2	0–2	1–1	1–3	1–2	2–1
ÍA	0–0	2–1	1–1	2–1		0–3	1–1	2–3	2–0	3–1
ÍBV	1–3	5–0	1–0	1–0	1–1		2–3	0–0	2–1	1–1
KA	0–0	0–1	2–1	1–2	2–3	3–1		3–0	1–2	3–0
KR	2–1	3–1	4–0	1–2	1–0	0–2	2–1		2–1	2–1
Valur	2–3	2–0	1–0	1–2	1–3	4–1	2–2	1–1		0–1
Þróttur	0–3	2–1	2–1	2–3	1–3	2–0	3–1	1–2	0–1	

Source: RSSSF
Legend: Blue = home team win; Yellow = draw; Red = away team win.

== Top goalscorers ==
Rank	Player	Club	Goals
1	(Denmark) Søren Hermansen	Þróttur	10
1	(Iceland) Gunnar Heiðar Þorvaldsson	ÍBV	10
1	(Iceland) Björgólfur Takefusa	Þróttur	10
4	(Norway) Steinar Tenden	KA	9
5	(Denmark) Allan Borgvardt	FH	8
5	(Iceland) Jóhann Hreiðarsson	Valur	8
7	(Iceland) Stefán Þór Þórðarson	ÍA	7
7	(Iceland) Arnar Gunnlaugsson	KR	7
7	(Iceland) Jónas Grani Garðarsson	FH	7
7	(Iceland) Veigar Páll Gunnarsson	KR	7

Source: RSSSF
