= Háaleiti og Bústaðir =

- District
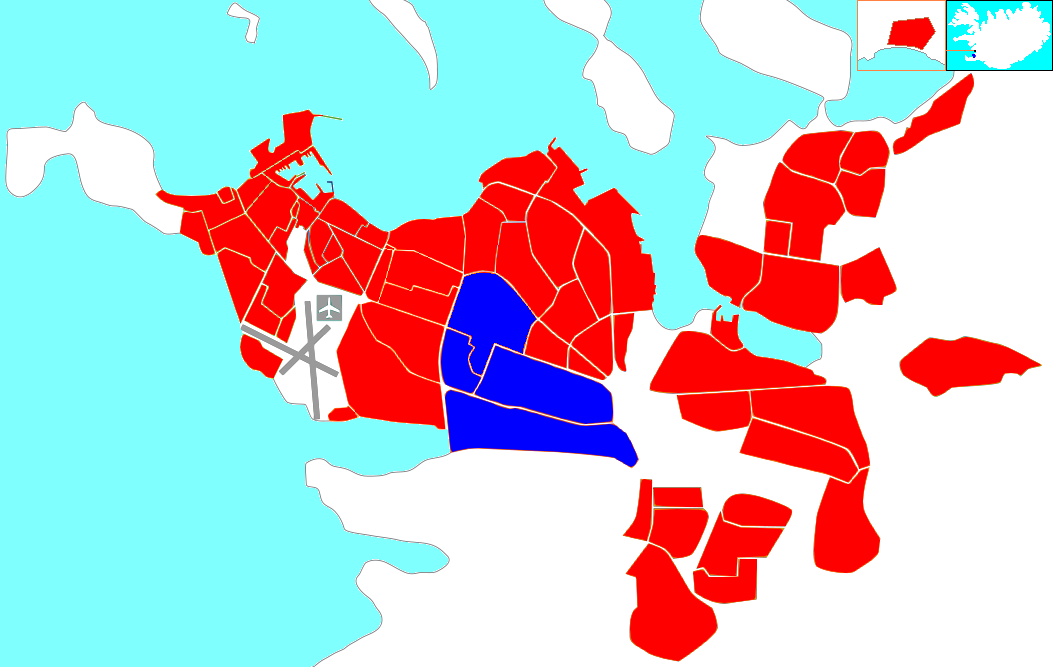
- Coordinates: 64°07′45″N 21°52′47″W
- Country: Iceland
- Region: Capital
- Municipality: Reykjavík

Area
  - Total: 4.3 km^{2} (1.7 sq mi)

Population (2010)
  - Total: 13,700
  - Density: 3,200/km^{2} (8,300/sq mi)
- Postal code: IS-108

Háaleiti og Bústaðir (Icelandic pronunciation: [ˈhauːaˌleiːtɪ ɔːɣ ˈpuːˌstaːðɪr̥]) is a district of Reykjavík, the capital of Iceland. Within the district are four neighbourhoods: Háaleiti proper, Kringla [ˈkʰriŋla], Gerði [ˈcɛrðɪ] and Fossvogur [ˈfɔsːˌvɔːɣʏr̥].
