= Hlíðar =

- District
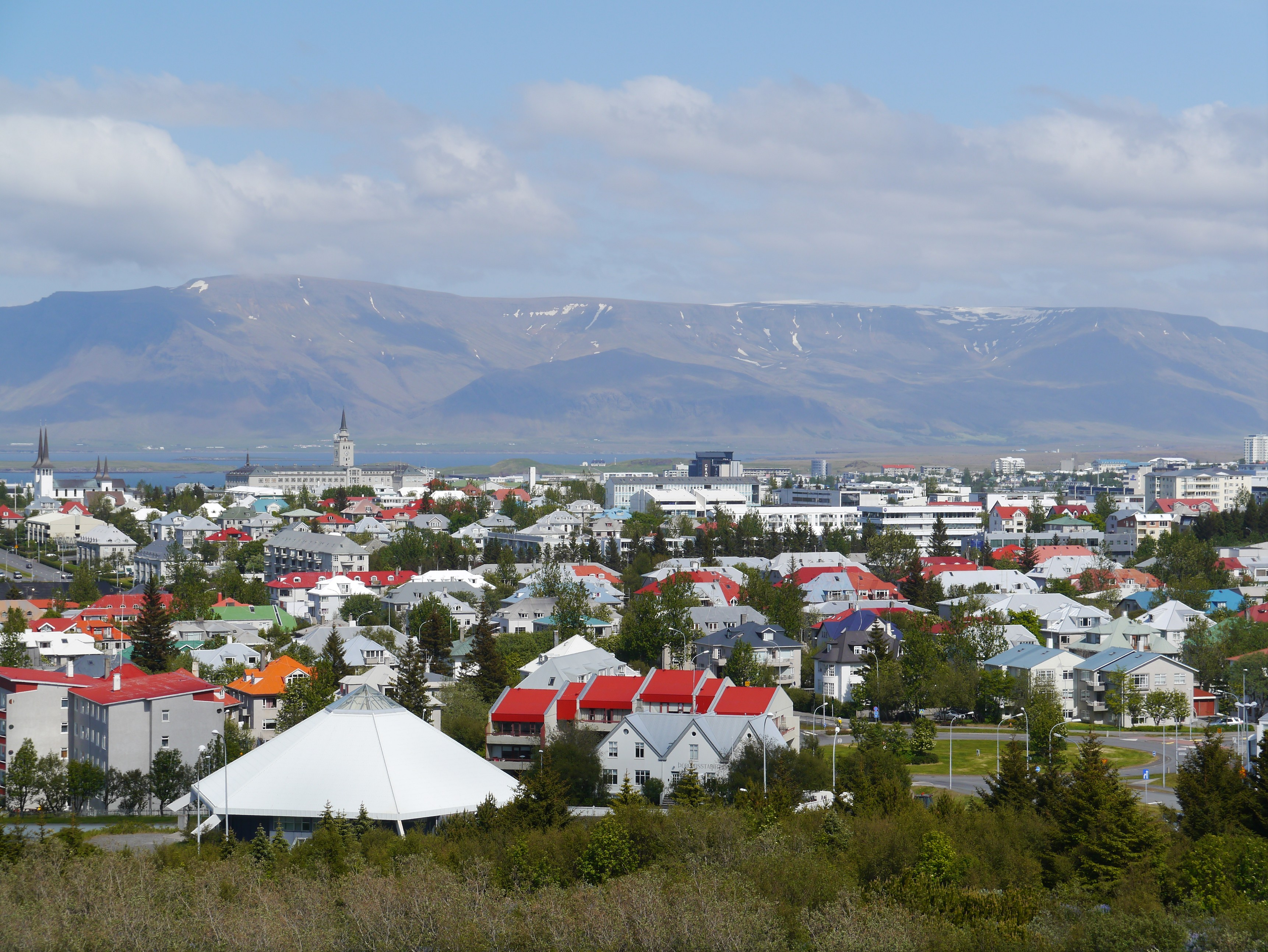
- Skyline of Hlíðar

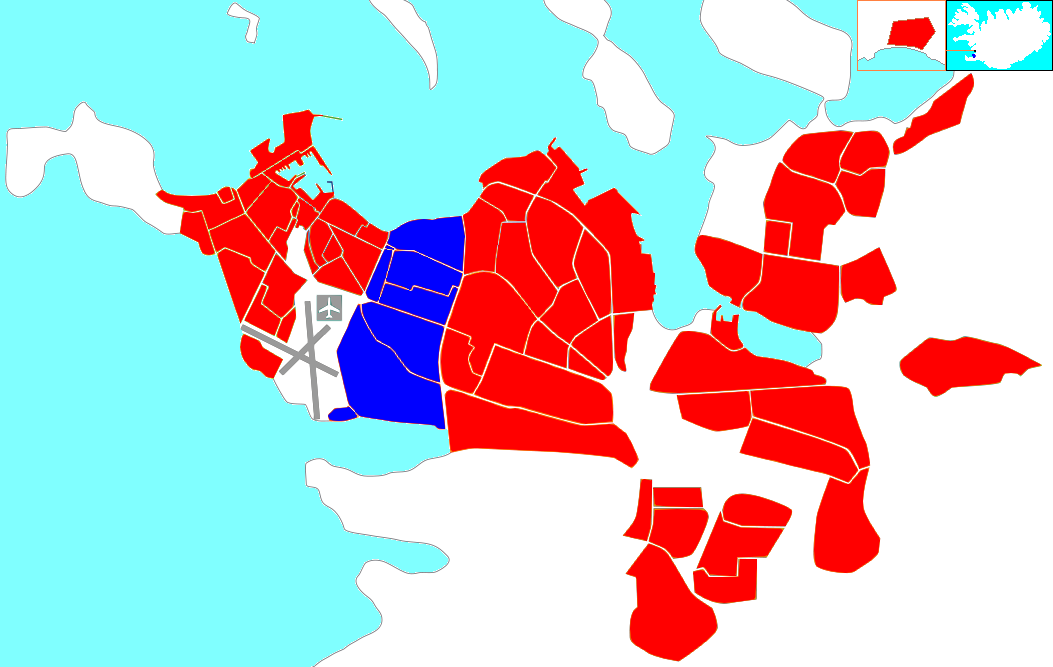
- Coordinates: 64°08′04″N 21°55′08″W
- Country: Iceland
- Region: Capital
- Municipality: Reykjavík

Area
  - Total: 3.3 km^{2} (1.3 sq mi)

Population (2010)
  - Total: 9,600
  - Density: 2,900/km^{2} (7,500/sq mi)
- Postal code: IS-105

Hlíðar (Icelandic pronunciation: [ˈl̥iːðar̥]) or Hlíðahverfi [ˈl̥iːðaˌkʰvɛrvɪ] is a sub-municipal administrational district within Reykjavík, Iceland. It includes six neighbourhoods: Hlíðar proper, Norðurmýri [ˈnɔrðʏrˌmiːrɪ], Holt [ˈhɔl̥t], Hlemmur [ˈl̥ɛmmʏr̥], Suðurhlíðar [ˈsʏːðʏrˌl̥iːðar̥] and Öskjuhlíð [ˈœscʏˌl̥iːθ].
