= 1949 Úrvalsdeild =

Úrvalsdeild
- Season: 1949

Statistics of Úrvalsdeild in the 1949 season.

== Overview ==
It was contested by 5 teams, and KR won the championship. KR's Ólafur Hannesson and Hörður Óskarsson, as well as Fram's Guðmundur Jónsson, were the joint top scorers with 4 goals.

== Final league table ==
Pos	Team	Pld	W	D	L	GF	GA	GD	Pts
1	KR (C)	4	1	3	0	10	8	+2	5
2	Fram	4	2	1	1	12	9	+3	5
3	Valur	4	1	2	1	6	6	0	4
4	Víkingur	4	2	0	2	7	8	−1	4
5	ÍA	4	0	2	2	5	9	−4	2

Source: rsssf.com
Rules for classification: 1) points; 2) goal difference; 3) number of goals scored.
(C) Champions

== Results ==
Home \ Away	FRA	KR	VAL	VÍK	ÍA
Fram		2–2	3–1	2–4	5–2
KR			2–2	3–1	3–3
Valur				3–1	0–0
Víkingur					1–0
ÍA					
