= Björgólfur Hideaki Takefusa =

Icelandic footballer

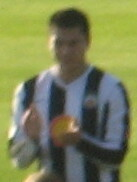

Personal information
- Date of birth: 11 May 1980 (age 46)
- Place of birth: Iceland
- Height: 1.80 m (5 ft 11 in)
- Position: Forward

Senior career*
Years	Team	Apps	(Gls)
1998–2003	Þróttur	60	(24)
2004–2005	Fylkir	28	(13)
2006–2010	KR	88	(51)
2011–2012	Víkingur	14	(7)
2012	→ Fylkir (Loan)	17	(3)
2013	Valur	7	(0)
2014	Fram	8	(0)
2014	→ Þróttur	9	(3)
2015	Þróttur	0	(0)
2018	Ármann	0	(0)
2019–2020	KV	8	(4)
2020	SR	0	(0)

International career^{‡}
2003–2009	Iceland	3	(0)
- * Club domestic league appearances and goals as of 25 March 2017 ‡ National team caps and goals as of 14 March 2010

Björgólfur Hideaki Takefusa (born 11 May 1980) is an Icelandic former professional footballer who played as a forward. He formerly represented the Iceland national team, making three appearances in 2003 and 2009.

== Early life ==
Björgólfur was born 11 May 1980. His father is Kenichi Takefusa, noted in Iceland for teaching karate and founding the company JapÍs, which imported Japanese musical instruments and later became a record label. When Björgólfur was four years old, Kenichi left his family and returned to Japan. Björgólfur's parents divorced when he was five.

== Career ==
His football career started at Þróttur, where he made 37 league appearances. From Þróttur he was signed by Fylkir and played two seasons there. He was signed to KR from Fylkir in October 2005 after having enjoyed a spell there from 2003. Björgólfur moved from KR to Viking in October 2010. The most significant goal he ever scored was in a KR victory against AEL in the 2009–10 UEFA Europa League second qualifying round. This goal sealed a 2–0 victory and a tie against FC Basel in the next qualifying round. He became a league's top scorer in 2009.

Björgólfur played three times for the Icelandic national team, against Mexico in 2003, and Georgia and Iran in 2009.

== Personal life ==
Björgólfur's half-sister is the former TV presenter Dóra Takefusa. He studied finance in Boston.
