= 1938 Úrvalsdeild =

Úrvalsdeild
- Season: 1938

Statistics of Úrvalsdeild in the 1938 season.

== Overview ==
It was contested by 4 teams, and Valur won the championship. Valur's Magnús Bergsteinsson, Fram's Jón Sigurðsson and Víkingur's Björgvin Bjarnason were the joint top scorers with 3 goals.

== Final league table ==
Pos	Team	Pld	W	D	L	GF	GA	GD	Pts
1	Valur (C)	3	2	1	0	11	9	+2	5
2	Víkingur	3	1	1	1	6	6	0	3
3	Fram	3	0	2	1	7	8	−1	2
4	KR	3	0	2	1	5	6	−1	2

Source: rsssf.com
Rules for classification: 1) points; 2) goal difference; 3) number of goals scored.
(C) Champions

== Results ==
Home \ Away	FRA	KR	VAL	VÍK
Fram		1–1	3–4	3–3
KR			4–4	0–1
Valur				3–2
Víkingur				
