= 1935 Úrvalsdeild =

Úrvalsdeild
- Season: 1935

Statistics of Úrvalsdeild in the 1935 season.

== Overview ==
It was contested by 4 teams, and Valur won the championship. KR's Þorsteinn Einarsson and Bjarni Ólafsson, as well as Valur's Magnús Bergsteinsson, were the joint top scorers with 3 goals each.

== Final league table ==
Pos	Team	Pld	W	D	L	GF	GA	GD	Pts
1	Valur (C)	3	2	1	0	6	2	+4	5
2	KR	3	2	0	1	10	2	+8	4
3	Fram	3	1	1	1	6	3	+3	3
4	Víkingur	3	0	0	3	2	17	−15	0

Source: rsssf.com
Rules for classification: 1) points; 2) goal difference; 3) number of goals scored.
(C) Champions

== Results ==
Home \ Away	FRA	KR	VAL	VÍK
Fram		1–3	0–0	5–0
KR			0–1	7–0
Valur				5–2
Víkingur				
