= 1940 Úrvalsdeild =

Úrvalsdeild
- Season: 1940

Statistics of Úrvalsdeild in the 1940 season.

== Overview ==
It was contested by 4 teams, and Valur won the championship. Valur's Sigurpáll Jónsson and Víkingur's Ingólfur Isebarn were the joint top scorers with 4 goals.

== Final league table ==
Pos	Team	Pld	W	D	L	GF	GA	GD	Pts
1	Valur (C)	3	2	1	0	6	4	+2	5
2	Víkingur	3	1	2	0	7	4	+3	4
3	KR	3	1	0	2	6	6	0	2
4	Fram	3	0	1	2	4	9	−5	1

Source: rsssf.com
Rules for classification: 1) points; 2) goal difference; 3) number of goals scored.
(C) Champions

== Results ==
Home \ Away	FRA	VÍK	VAL	KR
Fram		2–2	2–3	0–4
Víkingur			1–1	4–1
Valur				2–1
KR				
