= 1944 Úrvalsdeild =

Úrvalsdeild
- Season: 1944

Statistics of Úrvalsdeild in the 1944 season.

== Overview ==
It was contested by 4 teams, and Valur won the championship. Valur's Sveinn Sveinsson, Sveinn Helgason and Jóhann Eyjólfsson, as well as Víkingur's Eiríkur Bergsson, were the joint top scorers with 2 goals. Íþróttafélag Reykjavíkur had initially participated but withdrew from the tournament after losing the first game 0-8 to Fram.

== Final league table ==
Pos	Team	Pld	W	D	L	GF	GA	GD	Pts
1	Valur (C)	3	2	1	0	6	3	+3	5
2	KR	3	2	0	1	3	2	+1	4
3	Víkingur	3	0	2	1	4	6	−2	2
4	Fram	3	0	1	2	3	5	−2	1

Source: rsssf.com
Rules for classification: 1) points; 2) goal difference; 3) number of goals scored.
(C) Champions

== Results ==
Home \ Away	FRA	VÍK	VAL	KR
Fram		2–2	1–2	0–1
Víkingur			2–2	0–2
Valur				2–0
KR				
