= 1937 Úrvalsdeild =

Úrvalsdeild
- Season: 1937

Statistics of Úrvalsdeild in the 1937 season.

== Overview ==
It was contested by 3 teams, and Valur won the championship. Valur's Óskar Jónsson was the top scorer with 3 goals.

== Final league table ==
Pos	Team	Pld	W	D	L	GF	GA	GD	Pts
1	Valur (C)	2	2	0	0	8	3	+5	4
2	KR	2	1	0	1	3	4	−1	2
3	Fram	2	0	0	2	3	7	−4	0

Source: rsssf.com
Rules for classification: 1) points; 2) goal difference; 3) number of goals scored.
(C) Champions

== Results ==
Home \ Away	VAL	KR	FRA
Valur		3–1	5–2
KR			2–1
Fram			
