= 1936 Úrvalsdeild =

Úrvalsdeild
- Season: 1936

Statistics of Úrvalsdeild in the 1936 season.

== Overview ==
It was contested by four teams, and Valur won the championship. Valur's Óskar Jónsson was the top scorer with five goals.

== Final league table ==
Pos	Team	Pld	W	D	L	GF	GA	GD	Pts
1	Valur (C)	3	2	1	0	10	5	+5	5
2	KR	3	1	2	0	10	4	+6	4
3	Fram	3	1	1	1	8	3	+5	3
4	Víkingur	3	0	0	3	1	17	−16	0

Source: rsssf.com
Rules for classification: 1) points; 2) goal difference; 3) number of goals scored.
(C) Champions

== Results ==
Home \ Away	FRA	KR	VAL	VÍK
Fram		1–1	1–2	6–0
KR			3–3	3–0
Valur				5–1
Víkingur				
