= 1999 Úrvalsdeild =

Úrvalsdeild
- Season: 1999

The 1999 season of Úrvalsdeild was the 88th season of league football in Iceland. KR won their 21st title. Valur and recently promoted Víkingur were relegated. The competition was known as Landssímadeild, due to its sponsorship by the now-defunct company, Landssíminn.

== Final league table ==
Pos	Team	Pld	W	D	L	GF	GA	GD	Pts	Qualification or relegation
1	KR (C)	18	14	3	1	43	13	+30	45	Qualification for the Champions League first qualifying round
2	ÍBV	18	11	5	2	31	14	+17	38	Qualification for the UEFA Cup qualifying round
3	Leiftur	18	6	8	4	22	26	−4	26	Qualification for the Intertoto Cup first round
4	ÍA	18	6	6	6	21	21	0	24	Qualification for the UEFA Cup qualifying round
5	Breiðablik	18	5	6	7	22	24	−2	21	
6	Grindavík	18	5	4	9	25	29	−4	19	
7	Fram	18	4	7	7	23	27	−4	19	
8	Keflavík	18	5	4	9	28	34	−6	19	
9	Valur (R)	18	4	6	8	28	38	−10	18	Relegation to 1. deild karla
10	Víkingur (R)	18	3	5	10	21	38	−17	14	Relegation to 1. deild karla

Source: rsssf.com
Rules for classification: 1) points; 2) goal difference; 3) number of goals scored.
(C) Champions; (R) Relegated

== Results ==
Each team played every opponent once home and away for a total of 18 matches.

Home \ Away	BRE	FRA	GRI	ÍA	ÍBV	ÍBK	KR	LEI	VAL	VÍK
Breiðablik		1–1	4–1	1–3	1–0	2–1	0–3	0–0	2–0	1–1
Fram	2–2		1–3	0–0	0–2	2–0	0–2	2–0	2–2	3–2
Grindavík	1–0	1–1		2–2	1–2	2–0	1–3	0–1	3–1	2–2
ÍA	2–3	1–0	1–0		1–1	2–2	0–2	0–0	0–1	1–1
ÍBV	2–1	1–1	2–1	2–0		1–0	2–1	5–0	2–2	3–0
Keflavík	2–1	2–1	2–3	2–0	1–1		1–3	2–2	4–4	3–2
KR	0–0	3–1	2–1	1–0	3–0	3–2		1–1	5–1	4–1
Leiftur	2–2	3–3	2–1	1–4	0–3	1–0	1–1		0–0	1–0
Valur	2–1	2–1	2–1	1–2	0–0	2–3	1–2	2–4		1–1
Víkingur	1–0	0–2	1–1	1–2	1–2	2–1	0–4	0–3	5–4	

Legend: Blue = home team win; Yellow = draw; Red = away team win.

== Top goalscorers ==
Rank	Player	Club	Goals
1	(Iceland) Steingrímur Jóhannesson	ÍBV	12
2	(Iceland) Bjarki Gunnlaugsson	KR	11
3	(Iceland) Grétar Ólafur Hjartarson	Grindavík	10
3	(Iceland) Kristján Carnell Brooks	Keflavík	10
5	(Iceland) Guðmundur Benediktsson	KR	9
5	(Brazil) Alexandre Barreto Dos Santos	Leiftur	9
5	(Iceland) Sigurbjörn Hreiðarsson	Valur	9
8	(Faroe Islands) Uni Arge	Leiftur	8
9	(Iceland) Hreiðar Bjarnason	Breiðablik	6
9	(Iceland) Kristinn Lárusson	Valur	6

1999 Landssímadeild winners
KR
21st title
