= 1990 Icelandic Cup =

Mjólkurbikarinn

Tournament details
- Country: Iceland

Final positions
- Champions: Valur
- Runners-up: KR

The 1990 Icelandic Cup was the 31st edition of the National Football Cup.

It took place between 22 May 1990 and 27 August 1990, with the final replay played at Laugardalsvöllur in Reykjavík. The cup was important, as winners qualified for the UEFA Cup Winners' Cup (if a club won both the league and the cup, the defeated finalists would take their place in the Cup Winners' Cup).

The 10 clubs from the 1. Deild entered in the last 16, with clubs from lower tiers entering in the three preliminary rounds. Teams played one-legged matches. In case of a draw, a penalty shoot-out took place (there were no replays, unlike in previous years).

For the first time in the history of the competition, the final finished in a draw after extra time. In contrast to other rounds, a replay took place, but this time, a penalty shoot-out took place when that match also ended in a draw. Valur Reykjavík won their sixth Icelandic Cup, and so qualified for Europe.

== First round ==
Team 1	Score	Team 2
22 May 1990
Fylkir	2–1	Grindavík
26 May 1990
Þórshöfn	2–5	Reynir Árskógsströnd
28 May 1990
Ernir	2–3	Keflavík
29 May 1990
Njarðvík	0–1	Ármann
Valur Reyðarfjörður	1–2	þrottur Norðfjörður
Hafnir	0–4	Víðir
Höttur	0–1	Einherji
Leiftur	3–1	Völsungur
TBA	0–2	Magni Grenivík
Dalvík	1–2	KS
Hamar	0–2	BÍ
Víkingur Ó.	0–1	Afturelding
Leiknir F.	4–2	Austri
þróttur	3–0	Ægir
Selfoss	6–0	TBR
Reynir Sandgerði	5–1	Árvakur H.
ÍR	6–0	Vikverji
Skallagrímur	2–1	Leiknir Reykjavík
30 May 1990
Huginn	4–4 (a.e.t.); 3−4 (pen)	Sindri
8 June 1990
Breiðablik	3–0	Snæfell

== Second round ==
Team 1	Score	Team 2
8 June 1990
Neisti H.	0–6	Tindastóll
9 June 1990
Stokkseyri	0–4	Afturelding
Ármann	2–4	Grótta
Hvöt	1–6	KS
Leiknir F.	2–3	Einherji
Reynir Sandgerði	0–1	ÍR
BÍ	1–2	Haukar
Víðir	3–6	Selfoss
Keflavík	3–1	IK
Leiftur	5–0	Magni Grenivík
Sindri	5–4	þrottur Norðfjörður
Fylkir	1–2	þróttur
HSþ	4–2	Reynir Árskógsströnd
11 June 1990
Breiðablik	5–1	Skallagrímur

== Third round ==
Team 1	Score	Team 2
19 June 1990
Grótta	0–3	Breiðablik
HSþ	2–5	KS
Tindastóll	2–1	Leiftur
Selfoss	5–1	Afturelding
Sindri	1–0	Einherji
Haukar	0–2	Keflavík
þróttur	0–3	ÍR

== Intermediary round ==
- 7 teams advanced from the third round, but only six teams qualified for the fourth round. There was therefore a playoff match between two qualifying teams, KS and Tindastóll.

Team 1	Score	Team 2
25 June 1990
KS	5–4	Tindastóll

== Fourth round ==
- Entry of ten teams from the 1. Deild

Team 1	Score	Team 2
5 July 1990
ÍA	2–0	KA
Víkingur	4–1	KS
Keflavík	1–1 (a.e.t.); 5−4 (pen)	ÍBV
Selfoss	3–3 (a.e.t.); 5−4 (pen)	ÍR
Breiðablik	1–0	Þór Akureyri
Sindri	0–2	KR
FH	1–2	Stjarnan
Valur	3–3 (a.e.t.); 4−2 (pen)	Fram

== Quarter-finals ==
Team 1	Score	Team 2
19 July 1990
Víkingur	2–1	Stjarnan
Valur	2–0	Breiðablik
KR	3–0	ÍA
Keflavík	3–2	Selfoss

== Semi-finals ==
Team 1	Score	Team 2
1 August 1990
Valur	2–0	Víkingur
Keflavík	2–4	KR

== Final ==
26 August 1990

KR	1–1 (a.e.t.)	Valur
Kristinsson 20'	Report	Bogason 74'

Laugardalsvöllur, Reykjavík
Attendance: 4,279
Referee: þorvalður Björnsson

=== Replay ===
29 August 1990

Valur	0–0 (a.e.t.)	KR
	Report
Penalties
Jonsson (penalty scored); Adolfsson (penalty scored); Gregory (penalty scored); Hreinsson (penalty missed); Már Másson (penalty scored); Kristjansson (penalty scored)	5–4	(penalty scored) Pétursson; (penalty scored) Margeirsson; (penalty scored) Bjorgvinsson; (penalty missed) Rafnsson; (penalty scored) Edvaldsson; (penalty missed) Skulason

Laugardalsvöllur, Reykjavík
Attendance: 3,422
Referee: þorvalður Björnsson
- Valur won their sixth Icelandic Cup, and qualified for the 1991–92 European Cup Winners' Cup.

== See also ==
- 1990 Úrvalsdeild
- Icelandic Men's Football Cup
