= Ormarr Örlygsson =

Icelandic footballer

Personal information
- Full name: Ormarr Örlygsson
- Date of birth: 24 November 1962 (age 63)
- Position: Defender

Senior career*
Years	Team	Apps	(Gls)
1981–1984	KA		
1985–1988	Fram	63	(4)
1989–1993	KA	78	(17)
1994	Þór	16	(1)

International career
1986–1992	Iceland	9	(0)
- * Club domestic league appearances and goals

Ormarr Örlygsson (born 24 November 1962) is an Icelandic former footballer who played as a defender.

== Club career ==
Ormarr played the majority of his career at hometown club KA Akureyri and had a four-year spell at Fram Reykjavík.

== International career ==
He made his debut for Iceland in a March 1983 friendly match against Bahrain and went on to win 9 caps, scoring no goals. His final international was an April 1992 friendly match against Israel.

== Personal life ==
He is the older brother of former international player and Nottingham Forest winger Þorvaldur Örlygsson. He was appointed branch manager of Íslandsbanki in Reyðarfjörður and Egilsstaðir in 2010 after working for a couple of years in Switzerland for a German chemical company.
