= 1966 Úrvalsdeild =

Úrvalsdeild
- Season: 1966

Statistics of Úrvalsdeild in the 1966 season.

== Overview ==
It was contested by 6 teams, and Valur won the championship. Keflavík's Jón Jóhannsson was the top scorer with 10 goals.

== Final league table ==
Pos	Team	Pld	W	D	L	GF	GA	GD	Pts	Qualification or relegation
1	Valur (C)	10	6	2	2	20	12	+8	14	Qualification for the European Cup first round
2	Keflavík	10	6	2	2	23	12	+11	14	
3	ÍBA	10	4	4	2	20	17	+3	12	
4	KR	10	4	2	4	19	13	+6	10	Qualification for the Cup Winners' Cup first round
5	ÍA	10	2	3	5	13	21	−8	7	
6	Þróttur (R)	10	0	3	7	7	27	−20	3	Relegation to 1. deild karla

Source: rsssf.com
Rules for classification: 1) points; 2) goal difference; 3) number of goals scored.
(C) Champions; (R) Relegated

== Results ==
Each team played every opponent once home and away for a total of 10 matches.

Home \ Away	ÍA	ÍBA	ÍBK	KR	VAL	ÞRÓ
ÍA		2–7	2–1	1–2	1–1	3–1
ÍBA	2–1		0–5	1–0	1–1	5–1
Keflavík	4–1	1–1		2–1	3–2	1–0
KR	1–1	2–2	0–2		1–0	5–0
Valur	1–0	3–0	4–3	3–2		1–0
Þróttur	1–1	1–1	1–1	1–5	1–4	

Legend: Blue = home team win; Yellow = draw; Red = away team win.
