= Arnljótur Davíðsson =

Icelandic footballer

Personal information
- Full name: Arnljótur Davíðsson
- Date of birth: 3 September 1968 (age 58)
- Place of birth: Iceland
- Position: Forward

Senior career*
| Years | Team | Apps | (Gls) |
| 1986–1990 | Fram | 49 | (8) |
| 1991 | ÍBV | 18 | (5) |
| 1992–1993 | Valur | 29 | (3) |
| 1996 | Valur | 16 | (3) |
| 1997–1998 | ÍR | 22 | (5) |
| 1998 | Fram | 8 | (0) |
| 2006 | Fram | 11 | (1) |

International career
| 1983–1985 | Iceland U17 | 11 | (4) |
| 1985 | Iceland U19 | 4 | (0) |
| 1988 | Iceland U21 | 3 | (0) |
| 1988 | Iceland | 3 | (0) |
- * Club domestic league appearances and goals

Arnljótur Davíðsson (born 3 September 1968) is an Icelandic former footballer who played as a forward. He won three caps for the Iceland national football team in 1988.
