= 1933 Úrvalsdeild =

Úrvalsdeild
- Season: 1933

Statistics of Úrvalsdeild in the 1933 season.

== Overview ==
It was contested by 4 teams, and Valur won the championship.

== Final league table ==
Pos	Team	Pld	W	D	L	GF	GA	GD	Pts
1	Valur (C)	3	3	0	0	17	3	+14	6
2	KR	3	2	0	1	11	7	+4	4
3	Fram	3	1	0	2	6	8	−2	2
4	Víkingur	3	0	0	3	0	16	−16	0

Source: rsssf.com
Rules for classification: 1) points; 2) goal difference; 3) number of goals scored.
(C) Champions

== Results ==
Home \ Away	FRA	KR	VAL	VÍK
Fram		1–5	0–3	5–0
KR			3–6	3–0
Valur				8–0
Víkingur				
