= 1947 Úrvalsdeild =

Úrvalsdeild
- Season: 1947

Statistics of Úrvalsdeild in the 1947 season.

== Overview ==
It was contested by 5 teams, and Fram won the championship. Valur's Einar Halldórsson (Valur)and Albert Guðmundsson, as well as ÍA's Ríkharður Jónsson and KR's Hörður Óskarsson, were the joint top scorers with 3 goals. ·

== Final league table ==
Pos	Team	Pld	W	D	L	GF	GA	GD	Pts
1	Fram (C)	4	3	1	0	7	4	+3	7
2	Valur	4	3	0	1	8	2	+6	6
3	KR	4	2	1	1	8	6	+2	5
4	Víkingur	4	0	1	3	4	7	−3	1
5	ÍA	4	0	1	3	3	11	−8	1

Source: rsssf.com
Rules for classification: 1) points; 2) goal difference; 3) number of goals scored.
(C) Champions

== Results ==
Home \ Away	FRA	KR	VAL	VÍK	ÍA
Fram		2–2	1–0	2–1	2–1
KR			0–2	2–1	4–1
Valur				2–1	4–0
Víkingur					1–1
ÍA					
