= 1956 Úrvalsdeild =

Úrvalsdeild
- Season: 1956

Statistics of Úrvalsdeild in the 1956 season.

== Overview ==
It was contested by 6 teams, and Valur won the championship. KR's Sigurður Bergsson and ÍA's Þórður Þórðarson were the joint top scorers with 6 goals.

== Final league table ==
Pos	Team	Pld	W	D	L	GF	GA	GD	Pts
1	Valur (C)	5	4	1	0	14	6	+8	9
2	KR	5	3	2	0	14	8	+6	8
3	ÍA	5	3	1	1	17	6	+11	7
4	Fram	5	2	0	3	10	12	−2	4
5	ÍBA	5	1	0	4	3	13	−10	2
6	Víkingur (R)	5	0	0	5	6	19	−13	0

Source: rsssf.com
Rules for classification: 1) points; 2) goal difference; 3) number of goals scored.
(C) Champions; (R) Relegated

== Results ==
Home \ Away	FRA	KR	VAL	VÍK	ÍBA	ÍA
Fram		2–3	2–5	4–2	2–0	0–2
KR			1–1	4–2	3–0	3–3
Valur				4–1	1–0	3–2
Víkingur					1–3	0–4
ÍBA						0–6
ÍA						
