= Þorláksson =

Þorláksson is a last name of Icelandic origin, meaning son of Þorlákur. In Icelandic names, the last name is not usually a surname, but a patronymic. Notable people with the name include:

- Árni Þorláksson (1237–1298), Icelandic Roman Catholic clergyman; Bishop of Iceland 1269–98
- Guðbrandur Þorláksson (1541–1627), Icelandic mathematician and cartographer; Bishop of Hólar to 1627
- Jón Þorláksson (1877–1935), Icelandic politician; Prime Minister of Iceland 1926–27
- Þórarinn B. Þorláksson (1867–1924), Icelandic painter
