= 1946 Úrvalsdeild =

Úrvalsdeild
- Season: 1946

Statistics of Úrvalsdeild in the 1946 season.

== Overview ==
It was contested by 6 teams, and Fram won the championship. Fram's Valtýr Guðmundsson was the top scorer with 6 goals.

== Final league table ==
| Pos | Team | Pld | W | D | L | GF | GA | GD | Pts |
|---|---|---|---|---|---|---|---|---|---|
| 1 | Fram (C) | 5 | 4 | 1 | 0 | 17 | 10 | +7 | 9 |
| 2 | KR | 5 | 3 | 1 | 1 | 16 | 9 | +7 | 7 |
| 3 | Valur | 5 | 3 | 1 | 1 | 11 | 7 | +4 | 7 |
| 4 | Víkingur | 5 | 0 | 3 | 2 | 11 | 15 | −4 | 3 |
| 5 | ÍA | 5 | 0 | 2 | 3 | 6 | 13 | −7 | 2 |
| 6 | ÍBA | 5 | 0 | 2 | 3 | 6 | 13 | −7 | 2 |

Source: rsssf.com
Rules for classification: 1) points; 2) goal difference; 3) number of goals scored.
(C) Champions

== Results ==
| Home \ Away | FRA | KR | VAL | VÍK | ÍA | ÍBA |
|---|---|---|---|---|---|---|
| Fram | | 3–1 | 2–1 | 5–5 | 4–1 | 3–2 |
| KR | | | 3–3 | 4–1 | 4–1 | 4–1 |
| Valur | | | | 2–1 | 2–1 | 3–0 |
| Víkingur | | | | | 2–2 | 2–2 |
| ÍA | | | | | | 1–1 |
| ÍBA | | | | | | |
