= 1945 Úrvalsdeild =

Úrvalsdeild
- Season: 1945

Statistics of Úrvalsdeild in the 1945 season.

== Overview ==
It was contested by 4 teams, and Valur won the championship. KR's Hörður Óskarsson was the top scorer with 6 goals.

== Final league table ==
Pos	Team	Pld	W	D	L	GF	GA	GD	Pts
1	Valur (C)	3	3	0	0	15	0	+15	6
2	KR	3	2	0	1	10	1	+9	4
3	Fram	3	0	1	2	1	12	−11	1
4	Víkingur	3	0	1	2	1	14	−13	1

Source: rsssf.com
Rules for classification: 1) points; 2) goal difference; 3) number of goals scored.
(C) Champions

== Results ==
Home \ Away	VAL	KR	FRA	VÍK
Valur		1–0	5–0	9–0
KR			6–0	4–0
Fram				1–1
Víkingur				
