= Hörður Magnússon (footballer, born 1966) =

Icelandic footballer

Personal information
- Date of birth: 19 February 1966 (age 60)
- Place of birth: Reykjavík, Iceland
- Position: Forward

Senior career*
Years	Team	Apps	(Gls)
1983–1996	FH		
1997	Valur	15	(3)
1998–2001	FH	70	(47)
2003	ÍR	4	(3)

International career
1990–1993	Iceland	9	(1)
- * Club domestic league appearances and goals

Hörður Magnússon (born 19 February 1966) is an Icelandic former footballer who played as a forward. He was part of the Iceland national team between 1990 and 1993. He played nine matches, scoring one goal.

He became Úrvalsdeild top scorer in 1989, 1990 and 1991.

== Personal life ==
Hörður is the son of Icelandic actor and comedian Magnús Ólafsson and cousin of actor Stefán Karl Stefánsson.
