= 1984 Úrvalsdeild =

Edition of the Icelandic soccer championship

Úrvalsdeild
- Season: 1984

Statistics of Úrvalsdeild in the 1984 season.

== Overview ==
It was contested by 10 teams, and ÍA won the championship. Fram's Guðmundur Steinsson was the top scorer with 10 goals.

== Final league table ==
Pos	Team	Pld	W	D	L	GF	GA	GD	Pts	Qualification or relegation
1	ÍA (C)	18	12	2	4	33	18	+15	38	Qualification for the European Cup first round
2	Valur	18	7	7	4	24	16	+8	28	Qualification for the UEFA Cup first round
3	Keflavík	18	8	3	7	19	22	−3	27	
4	KR	18	6	7	5	20	23	−3	25	
5	Víkingur	18	6	6	6	29	28	+1	24	
6	Fram	18	6	4	8	23	22	+1	22	Qualification for the Cup Winners' Cup first round
7	Þór	18	6	4	8	25	25	0	22	
8	Þróttur	18	5	7	6	19	19	0	22	
9	Breiðablik (R)	18	4	8	6	17	20	−3	20	Relegation to 1. deild karla
10	KA (R)	18	4	4	10	23	39	−16	16	Relegation to 1. deild karla

Source: RSSSF
Rules for classification: 1) points; 2) goal difference; 3) number of goals scored.
(C) Champions; (R) Relegated

== Results ==
Each team played every opponent once home and away for a total of 18 matches.

Home \ Away	BRE	FRA	ÍA	KA	ÍBK	KR	VAL	VÍK	ÞÓR	ÞRÓ
Breiðablik		0–1	1–2	1–0	0–1	3–3	1–2	2–0	2–2	0–0
Fram	0–0		0–1	2–0	1–0	1–2	1–1	1–2	1–0	2–2
ÍA	3–0	1–0		3–1	1–2	2–0	1–0	2–3	3–2	2–0
KA	0–1	0–4	0–2		4–2	2–0	1–4	3–3	1–2	2–2
Keflavík	2–1	2–1	1–2	1–1		0–3	1–0	3–1	1–2	1–0
KR	1–1	3–2	0–0	2–0	1–0		0–0	0–3	2–5	1–0
Valur	1–1	1–1	4–2	1–2	0–0	0–0		3–0	1–0	1–1
Víkingur	2–2	1–3	2–2	6–2	3–0	1–1	1–0		0–2	0–0
Þór	0–1	3–0	0–3	1–1	0–0	3–1	2–3	1–1		0–1
Þróttur	0–0	3–2	2–1	2–3	1–2	0–0	1–2	1–0	3–0	

Source: RSSSF
Legend: Blue = home team win; Yellow = draw; Red = away team win.
