= 1985 Úrvalsdeild =

Úrvalsdeild
- Season: 1985

Statistics of Úrvalsdeild in the 1985 season.

== Overview ==
It was contested by 10 teams, and Valur won the championship. Fram's Ómar Torfason was the top scorer with 13 goals.

== Final league table ==
Pos	Team	Pld	W	D	L	GF	GA	GD	Pts	Qualification or relegation
1	Valur (C)	18	11	5	2	28	12	+16	38	Qualification for the European Cup first round
2	ÍA	18	11	3	4	37	20	+17	36	Qualification for the UEFA Cup first round
3	Þór	18	11	2	5	33	21	+12	35	
4	Fram	18	10	4	4	37	26	+11	34	Qualification for the Cup Winners' Cup first round
5	Keflavík	18	9	2	7	31	23	+8	29	
6	KR	18	8	5	5	32	26	+6	29	
7	FH	18	5	2	11	23	41	−18	17	
8	Víðir	18	4	4	10	21	38	−17	16	
9	Þróttur (R)	18	3	4	11	18	32	−14	13	Relegation to 1. deild karla
10	Víkingur (R)	18	2	1	15	17	38	−21	7	Relegation to 1. deild karla

Source: RSSSF
Rules for classification: 1) points; 2) goal difference; 3) number of goals scored.
(C) Champions; (R) Relegated

== Results ==
Each team played every opponent once home and away for a total of 18 matches.

Home \ Away	FH	FRA	ÍA	ÍBK	KR	VAL	VÍÐ	VÍK	ÞÓR	ÞRÓ
FH		1–5	0–3	1–1	1–1	1–2	2–3	4–3	0–2	2–0
Fram	2–0		2–3	3–1	4–1	2–2	2–1	2–0	2–1	1–1
ÍA	2–3	6–2		1–2	1–3	0–0	7–0	1–0	2–1	1–0
Keflavík	1–3	3–0	2–3		1–1	1–2	4–0	3–1	3–1	2–1
KR	3–1	1–1	1–1	0–2		1–2	1–1	2–1	3–2	4–3
Valur	3–0	0–0	0–0	1–0	1–0		3–1	1–0	3–0	2–1
Víðir	0–1	3–4	0–2	1–2	0–2	1–1		3–0	0–2	3–2
Víkingur	3–2	0–3	2–3	2–3	0–2	2–1	0–1		1–2	1–3
Þór	6–1	2–0	2–0	1–0	3–1	2–1	1–1	2–1		3–2
Þróttur	1–0	0–2	0–1	1–0	1–5	0–3	2–2	0–0	0–0	

Source: RSSSF
Legend: Blue = home team win; Yellow = draw; Red = away team win.
