= 1987 Úrvalsdeild =

Úrvalsdeild
- Season: 1987

Statistics of Úrvalsdeild in the 1987 season.

== Overview ==
It was contested by 10 teams, and Valur won the championship. Fram's Pétur Ormslev was the top scorer with 12 goals.

== Final league table ==
| Pos | Team | Pld | W | D | L | GF | GA | GD | Pts | Qualification or relegation |
|---|---|---|---|---|---|---|---|---|---|---|
| 1 | Valur (C) | 18 | 10 | 7 | 1 | 30 | 10 | +20 | 37 | Qualification for the European Cup first round |
| 2 | Fram | 18 | 9 | 5 | 4 | 33 | 21 | +12 | 32 | Qualification for the Cup Winners' Cup first round |
| 3 | ÍA | 18 | 9 | 3 | 6 | 36 | 30 | +6 | 30 | Qualification for the UEFA Cup first round |
| 4 | Þór | 18 | 9 | 2 | 7 | 33 | 33 | 0 | 29 | |
| 5 | KR | 18 | 7 | 4 | 7 | 28 | 22 | +6 | 25 | |
| 6 | KA | 18 | 5 | 6 | 7 | 18 | 17 | +1 | 21 | |
| 7 | Keflavík | 18 | 5 | 6 | 7 | 22 | 30 | −8 | 21 | |
| 8 | Völsungur | 18 | 4 | 5 | 9 | 20 | 32 | −12 | 17 | |
| 9 | Víðir (R) | 18 | 3 | 8 | 7 | 20 | 33 | −13 | 17 | Relegation to 1. deild karla |
| 10 | FH (R) | 18 | 4 | 4 | 10 | 22 | 34 | −12 | 16 | Relegation to 1. deild karla |

Source: rsssf.com
Rules for classification: 1) points; 2) goal difference; 3) number of goals scored.
(C) Champions; (R) Relegated

== Results ==
Each team played every opponent once home and away for a total of 18 matches.

| Home \ Away | FH | FRA | ÍA | KA | ÍBK | KR | VAL | VÍÐ | VÖL | ÞÓR |
|---|---|---|---|---|---|---|---|---|---|---|
| FH | | 0–1 | 0–1 | 0–0 | 2–1 | 2–1 | 1–3 | 0–0 | 3–3 | 4–1 |
| Fram | 2–1 | | 4–4 | 0–1 | 0–0 | 1–1 | 1–0 | 3–1 | 6–0 | 1–3 |
| ÍA | 1–2 | 1–3 | | 1–0 | 4–2 | 2–1 | 0–2 | 3–4 | 2–1 | 5–2 |
| KA | 2–1 | 0–3 | 0–0 | | 0–0 | 0–1 | 0–1 | 6–0 | 1–1 | 1–2 |
| Keflavík | 1–0 | 0–2 | 2–5 | 1–1 | | 1–1 | 1–2 | 0–0 | 0–1 | 2–0 |
| KR | 3–0 | 3–2 | 2–3 | 2–0 | 0–1 | | 0–2 | 1–1 | 2–0 | 5–0 |
| Valur | 1–1 | 0–0 | 2–1 | 2–1 | 7–1 | 1–1 | | 1–1 | 0–0 | 2–0 |
| Víðir | 5–2 | 1–1 | 0–0 | 0–1 | 1–3 | 2–0 | 1–1 | | 2–3 | 1–3 |
| Völsungur | 4–1 | 1–2 | 1–2 | 1–3 | 2–4 | 1–3 | 0–0 | 0–0 | | 0–1 |
| Þór | 4–2 | 4–1 | 2–1 | 1–1 | 2–2 | 3–1 | 0–3 | 5–0 | 0–1 | |

Legend: Blue = home team win; Yellow = draw; Red = away team win.

== Top goalscorers ==
| Rank | Player | Club | Goals |
|---|---|---|---|
| 1 | (Iceland) Pétur Ormslev | Fram | 12 |
| 2 | (Iceland) Halldór Áskelsson | Þór | 9 |
| 3 | (Iceland) Jónas Hallgrímsson | Völsungur | 8 |
| 3 | (Iceland) Sveinbjörn Hákonarson | ÍA | 8 |
| 3 | (Iceland) Pétur Pétursson | KR | 8 |
| 6 | (Iceland) Björn Rafnsson | KR | 7 |
| 6 | (Iceland) Valgeir Bárðarson | ÍA | 7 |
| 6 | (Iceland) Sigurjón Kristjánsson | Valur | 7 |
| 6 | (Iceland) Óli Þór Magnússon | Keflavík | 7 |
| 6 | (Iceland) Kristján Kristjánsson | Þór | 7 |
