= Guðmundur Torfason =

Icelandic footballer

Personal information
- Full name: Guðmundur Halldór Torfason
- Date of birth: 13 December 1961 (age 64)
- Place of birth: Vestmannaeyjar, Iceland
- Height: 6 ft 01 in (1.85 m)
- Position: Striker

Youth career
- ÍBV
- Ármann
- Fram

Senior career*
Years	Team	Apps	(Gls)
1979–1986	Fram	34	(27)
1986–1987	Beveren	7	(0)
1987–1988	Winterslag	24	(6)
1988	Racing Genk	12	(2)
1988–1989	Rapid Vienna	7	(1)
1989–1992	St Mirren	77	(26)
1992–1994	St Johnstone	38	(9)
1994–1995	Doncaster Rovers	4	(0)
1995	Fylkir	17	(4)
1996	Grindavík	12	(2)

International career
1978	Iceland U-17	1	(0)
1985–1991	Iceland	26	(4)

Managerial career
- 1996–1998: Grindavík
- 2000: Fram
- 2001–2002: ÍR
- * Club domestic league appearances and goals

Guðmundur "Gunni" Torfason (born 13 December 1961, in Vestmannaeyjar) is an Icelandic former footballer and manager.

== Playing career ==
=== Club ===
A striker, he became top goalscorer in the Icelandic league in 1986 with 19 goals when he was also named the Player of the Year. He moved to continental Europe with Belgian sides Beveren and Winterslag who later merged with Waterschei to become Racing Genk. Guðmundur became the first ever goalscorer of the new club when he scored against KV Mechelen. He then had a spell with Austrians Rapid Vienna, before joining St Mirren in 1989. He became club top scorer three seasons in a row. In 1992 Guðmundur left St Mirren for St Johnstone. In 1995, he moved for a brief spell at Doncaster Rovers. He returned to Iceland to play for second division Fylkir and eventually ended his career after spending the 1996 season with Grindavík.

=== International ===
Guðmundur made his debut for Iceland in July 1985 friendly match against the Faroe Islands and has earned a total of 26 caps, scoring 4 goals. He represented his country in 5 FIFA World Cup qualification matches and played his last international match for Iceland in a November 1991 European Championship qualifying match against France.

=== International goals ===
Scores and results list Iceland's goal tally first.

#	Date	Venue	Opponent	Score	Result	Competition
1	26 May 1987	Laugardalsvöllur, Reykjavík, Iceland	Netherlands	1–1	2–2	1988 Olympic Games qualification
2	26 May 1987	Laugardalsvöllur, Reykjavík, Iceland	Netherlands	1–1	2–2	1988 Olympic Games qualification
3	2 September 1987	Laugardalsvöllur, Reykjavík, Iceland	East Germany	1–0	2–0	1988 Olympic Games qualification
4	12 October 1988	İnönü Stadium, Istanbul, Turkey	Turkey	1–0	1–1	1990 FIFA World Cup qualification

== Managerial career ==
Guðmundur was a player-coach for Fylkir during the 1995 season. In November 1995, he was hired as the coach of Grindavík. He coached Fram in 2000.

On 30 October 2011 Guðmundur returned to Scottish football after being appointed as Rangers' Icelandic scout.
