= Pétur Ormslev =

Icelandic footballer

Personal information
- Full name: Pétur Úlfar Ormslev
- Date of birth: 28 July 1958 (age 68)
- Place of birth: Iceland
- Height: 1.75 m (5 ft 9 in)
- Position: Midfielder

Senior career*
| Years | Team | Apps | (Gls) |
| 1975–1981 | Fram | 93 | (32) |
| 1981–1985 | Fortuna Düsseldorf | 28 | (2) |
| 1985–1993 | Fram | 138 | (41) |

International career
| 1979–1991 | Iceland | 41 | (5) |

Managerial career
- 1992: Fram
- 1994–1996: KA
- 1996–1997: FH Hafnarfjörður
- 2001–2002: Fram
- * Club domestic league appearances and goals

Pétur Úlfar Ormslev (born 28 July 1958 in Iceland) is a retired football midfielder.

== Career ==
During his club career, Pétur mainly played for Fram Reykjavík, with three seasons at Fortuna Düsseldorf.

He also amassed 41 caps for the Iceland national team, scoring five goals.

At the end of his career, he acted as manager of Fram.
