= Guðmundur Steinsson =

Icelandic footballer

Personal information
- Date of birth: 18 July 1960 (age 66)
- Place of birth: Iceland
- Position: Forward

Senior career*
Years	Team	Apps	(Gls)
1978–1981	Fram Reykjavík		
1982–1983	Öster		
1984–1986	Fram Reykjavík		
1987	Kickers Offenbach		
1987–1990	Fram Reykjavík	62	(36)
1991–93	Víkingur Reykjavik	47	(21)
1994	Fram Reykjavík	12	(0)
1995–1996	Stjarnan	19	(11)
1996	Fram Reykjavík	8	(1)

International career
	Iceland U21	1	(0)
1980–?	Iceland	19	(8)
- * Club domestic league appearances and goals

Guðmundur Steinsson (born 18 July 1960) is an Icelandic former professional footballer who played as a forward. He made 19 appearances scoring eight goals for the Iceland national team. At club level he played for Knattspyrnufélagið Fram competing in the 1981–82 European Cup Winners' Cup and was the topscorer of the 1984 Úrvalsdeild with ten goals. With Víkingur he became topscorer of the 1991 Úrvalsdeild with 13 goals. He played for Víkingur also in the 1992–93 UEFA Champions League and scored in a match against CSKA Moscow.
