= Íþróttabandalag Vestmannaeyja =

Icelandic multi-sports district association

ÍBV
- Full name: Íþróttabandalag Vestmannaeyja
- Sports: Football; Handball; Basketball
- Founded: 1903; 123 years ago (as KV)
- Chairman: Sæunn Magnúsdóttir

Íþróttabandalag Vestmannaeyja (Icelandic pronunciation: [ˈiːˌθrouhtaˌpantaˌlaɣ ˈvɛstˌmanːaˌeiːja], lit. 'Vestmannaeyjar Sports Union'), commonly known as ÍBV, is an Icelandic multi-sport district association from Vestmannaeyjar off the south coast of Iceland. It was founded in 1903 as Knattspyrnufélag Vestmannaeyja by Björgúlfur Ólafsson, military doctor for the Dutch army. It was soon renamed to Knattspyrnufélag Vestmannaeyja (KV) and then to Íþróttabandalag Vestmannaeyja (ÍBV) héraðssamband in 1945. ÍBV played as KV in the first Icelandic first league tournament in 1912.

Different entities have been part of ÍBV over time. ÍBV-Íþróttafélag was founded in 1996 to manage football and handball when the youth team clubs Þór and Týr, that where subbrands to KV and then ÍBV for the youth coaching only, where merged. Sundfélag ÍBV was founded in 1977 for swimming. Körfuknattleiksfélag ÍBV was founded for basketball in 1995 after 9 years without basketballat the youth club Týr. Blakfélag ÍBV and Frjálsíþróttafélag ÍBV are younger association entities that also use the name of the district sporting association.

== Football ==
=== Men's football ===
ÍBV men's football team won the Icelandic championship in 1979, 1997 and 1998. It currently plays in the top-tier Úrvalsdeild karla.

=== Women's football ===
ÍBV women's football team has played in the top-tier Úrvalsdeild kvenna since 2011. It has won the Icelandic Cup twice, in 2004 and 2017.

== Handball ==
=== Men's handball ===
ÍBV men's handball team won the national championship in 2014 and 2018. On 24 December 2018, the team's goalkeeper, Kolbeinn Aron Arnarson, died at his home at the age of 29.

==== EHF records ====
Competition	M	W	D	L
EHF Cup	2	0	0	2
EHF Challenge Cup	12	8	1	3
EHF Cup Winners' Cup	2	0	0	2

Season	Competition	Round	Country	Opposition	Home	Away	Agg.
1991/92	EHF Cup Winners' Cup	R1	Norway	Runar Sandefjord	19:20	21:14	35:41
2014/15	EHF Cup	QR1	Israel	Maccabi Rishon LeZion	25:30	27:25	50:57
2015/16	EHF Challenge Cup	R2	Israel	Hapoel Ramat Gan	31:22	21:25	56:43
		R3	Portugal	Benfica	26:28	26:34	52:62
2017/18	EHF Challenge Cup	R3	Belarus	HC Gomel	32:27	27:31	63:54
		L16	Israel	Ramhat Hashron HC	32:25	21:21	53:46
		QF	Russia	SKIF Krasnodar	41:28	23:25	66:51
		SF	Romania	AHC Potaissa Turda	31:28	28:24	55:56
2018/19	EHF Cup	QR2	France	Pays d'Aix Université Club	24:23	25:36	49:59

=== Women's handball ===
ÍBV women's handball team has won the national championship four times, in 2000, 2003, 2004 and 2006.

== Basketball ==
=== Men's basketball ===
==== Honors ====
- Division II (2):

1977, 1999^{1}

^{1}As ÍV

==== Notable coaches ====
- (United States) James Booker 1978
