= Thula (disambiguation) =

Thula is a town in Yemen.

Thula may also refer to:

- Thula (poetic genre), a poetic genre
- Thula Thula, a private game reserve in Zululand, KwaZulu-Natal province in South Africa
- Al-Thula airbase, Syria, involved in the Daraa and As-Suwayda offensive (June 2015)

== See also ==
- Thyle
- Thula Baba Box, a maternity package
- Colias tyche thula (thula sulphur), a butterfly
- Brachylomia thula, a moth
- Egretta thula (snowy egret), a small white heron
- Tasmantrix thula, a moth
- Thula-thula, a novel by Annelie Botes
