= Einar Bragi =

Icelandic poet and publisher

- Born: Einar Bragi Sigurðsson; April 7, 1921; Eskifjördur, Iceland
- Died: March 26, 2005 (aged 83); Reykjavík
- Occupations: poet, publisher, translator
- Writing career
- Language: Icelandic
- Period: Post-World War II
- Movement: modernism

Einar Bragi (or Einar Bragi Sigurðsson) (7 April 1921 – 26 March 2005) was an Icelandic poet and publisher. He was a modernist who founded and edited the journal Birtingur, the leading forum for modernism in Iceland at the time.

Einar Bragi published nine books of poetry between 1950 and 1980. He is known as one of the Atom Poets. He also translated poetry into Icelandic.

== Poetry ==
Einar Bragi was born in Eskifjördur. His first two books were published while he was studying in Sweden; he returned to Iceland in 1953. His early writing was often polemic, and in the early stages of his career he felt the need to defend his own poetry and that of the other Atom Poets, arguing that modern poetry was intrinsically different from traditional poetry. Like other poets of his generation, he was influenced by Tómas Guðmundsson, and "even attempted to match Tómas Guðmundsson's polish in style." His subject matter includes love and nature, often joined together, and he is critical of greed and exploitation. His critique of social injustice, according to scholar of Icelandic literature Neijmann, is expressed through sarcasm or the use of imagery derived from nature, and is free from sermonizing.

His forms are highly varied and he employed alliteration and rhyme, but also wrote free verse and prose poetry. Some of his longer poems employ the traditional Icelandic form of the thula.

In the nine slim volumes of poetry he published, Einar Bragi reworks and revisits the same material, "so that in effect the poet was republishing his work over and over again." His prose poems were called "fine," with "a refined sense of poetic diction," and the Columbia dictionary of modern European literature likewise praises his "refined lyrical verse." French scholar Régis Boyer also commented on his admirably rhythmical prose.

In addition to writing poetry, Einar Bragi also translated poetry "from virtually all European languages," including English, French and Scandinavian languages (Swedish, Norwegian, Sami, Greenlandic, etc.), and acquired a reputation as a translator.

== Publishing ventures ==
With the Swiss-German artist Dieter Roth, he founded the publishing company Forlag Editions, which published a number of important books by Roth. In 1953, he founded the journal Birtingur, which became the "main forum for Icelandic modernists" and was published until 1968. Bragi died in Reykjavík.

== Bibliography ==
- Eitt kvöld í júní (1950)
- Svanur á báru (1952)
- Gestaboð um nótt (1953)
- Regn í maí (1957)
- Hreintjarnir (1960, republished 1962)
- Í ljósmálinu (1970)
- Ljóð (1983)
- Ljós í augum dagsins (2000)
