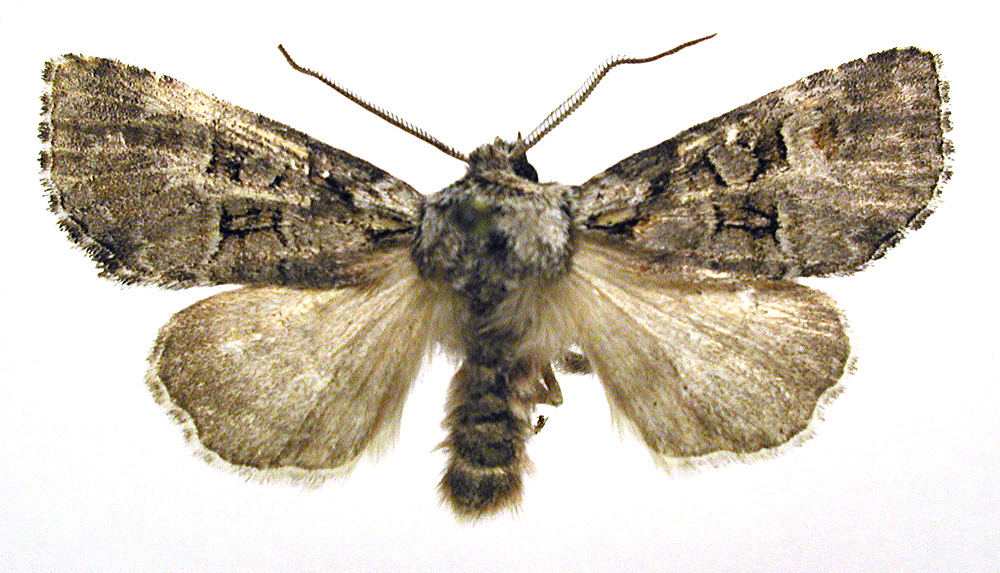
- Brachylomia viminalis

Scientific classification
- Kingdom: Animalia
- Phylum: Arthropoda
- Class: Insecta
- Order: Lepidoptera
- Superfamily: Noctuoidea
- Family: Noctuidae
- Tribe: Xylenini
- Subtribe: Xylenina
- Genus: Brachylomia; Hampson, 1906

Synonyms
- Lomilysis

= Brachylomia =

Genus of moths

Brachylomia is a genus of moths of the family Noctuidae.

== Species ==
- Brachylomia algens (Grote, 1878) (synonym Brachylomia onychina (Guenée, 1852))
- Brachylomia cascadia J.T.Troubridge & Lafontaine, 2007
- Brachylomia chretieni (Rothschild, 1914)
- Brachylomia curvifascia (Smith, 1891)
- Brachylomia discinigra (Walker, 1856)
- Brachylomia discolor Smith, 1904
- Brachylomia elda (French, 1887)
- Brachylomia incerta Köhler, 1952
- Brachylomia obscurifascia J.T.Troubridge & Lafontaine, 2007
- Brachylomia pallida J.T.Troubridge & Lafontaine, 2007
- Brachylomia populi (Strecker, 1898)
- Brachylomia pygmaea (Draudt, 1950)
- Brachylomia rectifascia (Smith, 1891)
- Brachylomia sierra J.T.Troubridge & Lafontaine, 2007
- Brachylomia thula (Strecker, 1898)
- Brachylomia uralensis (Warren, 1910)
- Brachylomia viminalis – minor shoulder-knot (Fabricius, 1777)
