= Daðason =

Daðason is a surname. Notable people with the surname include:

- Ásmundur Einar Daðason, Icelandic politician
- Ríkharður Daðason (born 1972), Icelandic football striker
- Sigfús Daðason, Icelandic poet
- Viktor Daðason (born 2008), Icelandic football forward
