= Ásta Sigurðardóttir =

Icelandic writer and visual artist

- Born: 1 April 1930
- Died: 21 December 1971 (aged 41)
- Cause of death: suicide
- Children: 6

Ásta Sigurðardóttir (1 April 1930 – 21 December 1971) was an Icelandic writer and visual artist recognized for her pioneering contributions to modernist short fiction. Her work is notably characterized by its depiction of urban marginalization in mid-twentieth-century Reykjavík.

Ásta first gained recognition with her short story "Sunnudagskvöld til mánudagsmorguns" (Sunday Evening to Monday Morning), published in the magazine Líf og list in 1951. Her subsequent 1961 collection of the same title later attained the status of a classic within Icelandic literature. She also produced drawings, linocuts, and decorated pottery, and additionally served as a life model for art students on occasion.

Ásta is often critically assessed as a preeminent post-war Icelandic literary figure. However, public reception during her lifetime was reportedly mixed, a phenomenon frequently attributed to the candid social themes and bohemian environment reflected in both her works and her public image.

== Biography ==
Ásta Jóna Sigurðardóttir was born on 1 April 1930, at Litla-Hraun, a farmstead located in Kolbeinsstaðahreppur within the Snæfellsnes region of Iceland. Her early childhood was spent in rural Iceland, where she initially lacked access to formal schooling. The family farm itself was austere, lacking basic amenities such as running water, electricity, and a radio. Books and storytelling served as the primary source of entertainment for the household. Her father's interest in literature is noted as a key factor in nurturing her innate creativity.

At the age of 14, Ásta relocated to Reykjavík to commence a formal education, a decision considered uncommon for a rural girl in mid-century Iceland. After obtaining her secondary school diploma, she enrolled in the Teacher's College (Kennaraskóli Íslands), from which she graduated as a qualified teacher in 1950. However, she never practiced in that profession.

=== Literary career ===
Ásta achieved prominence at the age of 21 when her short story "Sunnudagskvöld til mánudagsmorguns" (Sunday Night to Monday Morning) was published in the avant-garde magazine "Líf og list" (Life and Art) in 1951. The story caused a sensation by describing marginalized figures on the fringes of society, including alcoholics, the homeless, and the promiscuous. The narrative style was characterized by its pithiness, metaphorical depth, and elements of fantasy, employing sensuous, erotic, and partially grotesque language.

The short story collection "Sunnudagskvöld til mánudagsmorguns" was published in 1961 and quickly established itself as a classic. Two years earlier, in 1953, she published "Í hvaða vagni?" ("In What Carriage?"), in the journal Tímarit Máls og Menningar, which is considered one of the earliest modernist short stories in Iceland. Her complete work was later collected in 1985 under the title Sögur og ljóð (Stories and Poems), which included posthumous short stories, poetry, and previously unpublished illustrations.

Ásta is recognized as a pioneering figure in Icelandic modernism who challenged prevailing societal norms. Her stories, frequently described as poetic and hallucinogenically beautiful, often employed the perspective of a naïve girl or young woman. These narratives grappled with violence in mid-twentieth-century Iceland, viewing it through the lens of marginalized voices. She was among the first Icelandic writers to capture, from a vernacular perspective, a distinctly urban discourse stemming from the "raw" experience of the postwar era and a disillusioned view of the expanding bourgeois world.

=== Visual arts career ===
Ásta demonstrated artistic talent in the visual arts alongside her literary pursuits. She worked as a nude model for art students at the art academy, a role that generated considerable controversy within the conservative society of Reykjavík at the time. She is reported to have occasionally taken breaks nude, stating to shocked observers that she was in her "work uniform."

Between 1960 and 1963, Ásta designed a set of playing cards featuring detailed depictions of Icelandic folkloric figures, including sorcerers, witches, and ghosts. Although she died before completing the project, her descendants oversaw the full realization and publication of the cards by the publisher Forlagið in 2022.

== Lifestyle and public image ==
Ásta Sigurðardóttir embraced a bohemian lifestyle and was closely associated with the modernist artistic community in Reykjavík. She was a contemporary of the Atom Poets, a prominent group of modernist poets active during the same era. Her lifestyle and worldview led to her exile from mainstream society. She cultivated a glamorous public image, dressing in fashionable, self-sewn garments, dyeing her chestnut hair black, and applying makeup reminiscent of Hollywood heroines. She occasionally incorporated a pelt into her attire.

== Personal life ==
Ásta had six children from two marriages, both of which concluded in divorce. During her second year at Teacher's College, she became pregnant; it was initially arranged for her mother to care for the child while Ásta completed her studies, and her mother ultimately raised this child. She later underwent a coerced abortion at a time when the procedure was legal only under the narrowest of circumstances. Her grandson, Jón Daði Böðvarsson (born 1992), later became a professional footballer and played for the Icelandic national team. He is the grandson of both Ásta Sigurðardóttir and another prominent Icelandic writer, Þorsteinn frá Hamri.

== Last years ==
Ásta experienced significant poverty and housing instability throughout her life. She struggled for many years with alcoholism and depression. The inherent conflict between her desire for normality, security, and bourgeois acceptance and her need for rebellion and freedom reportedly generated a constant tension that is reflected across her short stories. She died by suicide on December 21, 1971, at the age of 41.

== Legacy ==
Despite her short life, the work of Ásta Sigurðardóttir has achieved a lasting impact on Icelandic literature. According to the writer Sjón, "Ásta Sigurðardóttir's short stories didn't only arrive as a meteor into Icelandic post-war literature of the 50s and 60s, the impact can still be seen in the works of writers three generations later." Her stories have been recognized as a major contribution to the Icelandic literary canon and as a Nordic classic.

Ásta Sigurðardóttir's life has been the subject of further attention. The biography Minn hlátur er sorg (My Laughter is Sorrow), written by Friðrika Benónýs, was published in 1992 and reissued in 2021. In 2018, an art exhibition dedicated to her visual work was presented at the Reykjavík Art Museum. Furthermore, her life has been adapted for the stage by the National Theater of Iceland. Her collected stories were translated into English by Meg Matich and published as Nothing to Be Rescued in the 2020s.

== See also ==
- Icelandic literary
- Atom Poets
