= Akranes =

- Town
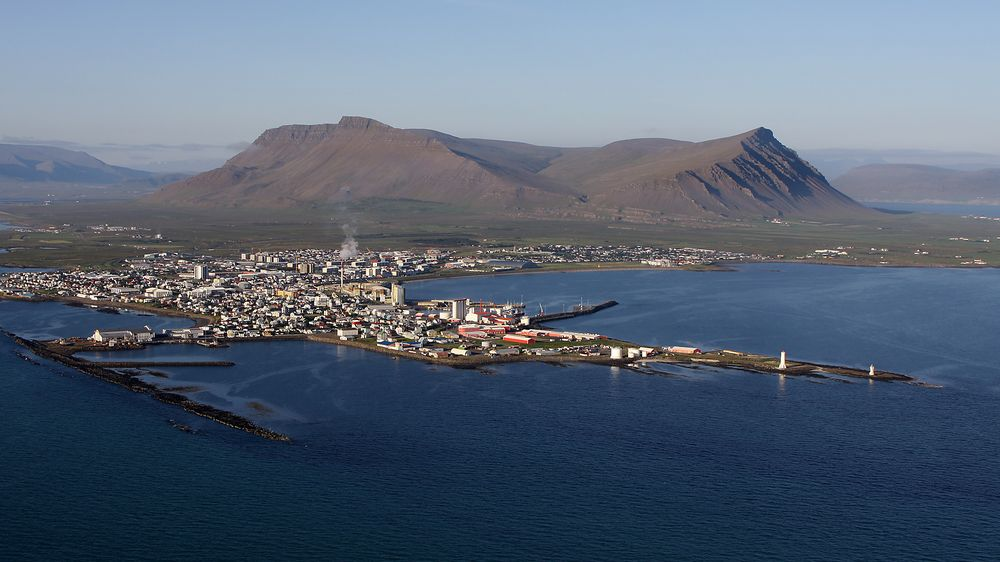
- Interactive map of Akranes
- Location within Iceland
- Country: Iceland
- Region: Western Region
- Constituency: Northwest Constituency
- Municipality: Akraneskaupstaður

Government
  - Mayor: Haraldur Benediktsson

Area
  - Total: 9 km^{2} (3.5 sq mi)

Population (2024)
  - Total: 8,452
  - Density: 823.44/km^{2} (2,132.7/sq mi)
- Postal code(s): 300, 301, 302
- Municipal number: 3000
- Website: akranes.is

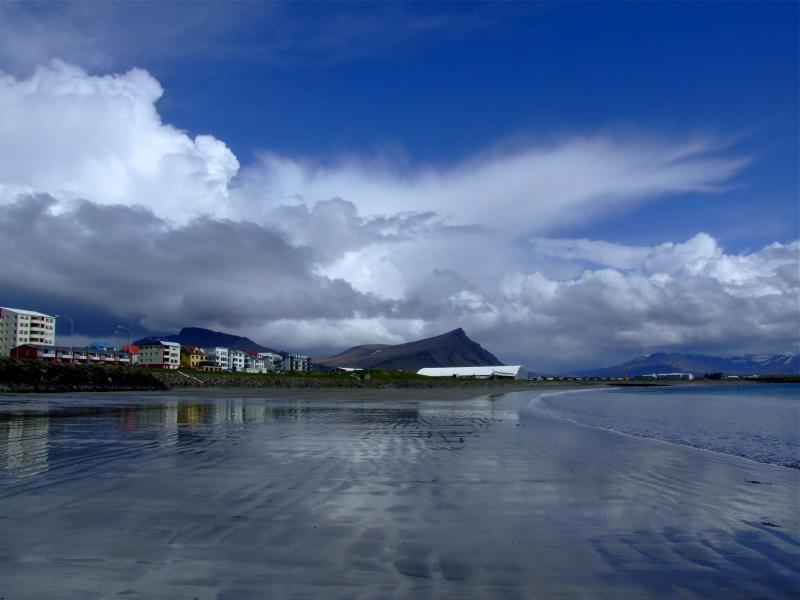
Langisandur in Akranes

Akranes (Icelandic pronunciation: [ˈaːkraˌnɛːs]) is a port town in the municipality of Akraneskaupstaður on the west coast of Iceland, around 50 km (31 mi) north of the capital Reykjavík.

The area where Akranes is located was settled in the 9th century; however, it did not receive a municipal charter until 1942.

== History ==
Akranes was settled in the 9th century by the brothers Þormóður and Ketill, sons of Bresi, who came from Ireland. The town started to form in the mid-17th century as a fishing village. In 1942, it was formally chartered, and in the following years it had the biggest surge in population in its history.

Industry has been a big and growing employer: a cement plant has been operated in the town since the 1950s, and an aluminium smelting plant has been in operation near the town since 1998.

== Economy ==
The fishing industry remains the town's most important source of employment. Akranes also acts as a service center for the large rural region surrounding it.

The town is expected to grow in the coming years because of an increase in industrial activity and improvements in transportation to the Reykjavík area. The 5.77 km-long (3.59 mi) Hvalfjörður Tunnel, opened in 1998, is one of the world's longest underwater road tunnels.

== Notable people ==
Akranes was the birthplace of the Atom poet Jón Óskar, the writer Eva Björg Ægisdóttir and footballers Ríkharður Jónsson, Arnór Sigurðsson and Hakon Arnar Haraldsson.

== Sport ==
Akranes has a strong football tradition. The local team, Íþróttabandalag Akraness (ÍA), which currently plays in the Úrvalsdeild karla, has for many years been among the best of the Icelandic football league system. Ríkharður Jónsson, who was born in the town, is often considered to be one of Iceland's finest footballers. He both played for and managed ÍA. Former Sheffield Wednesday and Arsenal midfielder Siggi Jónsson was also born in Akranes and had three seasons as a player with ÍA. The town is also home to second division club Knattspyrnufélagið Kári.

== Climate ==
Akranes has a subarctic climate (Köppen: Dfc; Trewartha: Eolo), with temperatures rising above 10 °C (50 °F) only in July and August.

Climate data for Akranes, 1961–1990 normals, extremes 1965–1987
Month	Jan	Feb	Mar	Apr	May	Jun	Jul	Aug	Sep	Oct	Nov	Dec	Year
Record high °C (°F)	10.0 (50.0)	9.0 (48.2)	9.9 (49.8)	13.9 (57.0)	16.9 (62.4)	17.9 (64.2)	24.1 (75.4)	21.3 (70.3)	19.4 (66.9)	14.5 (58.1)	12.2 (54.0)	10.7 (51.3)	24.1 (75.4)
Mean daily maximum °C (°F)	2.2 (36.0)	2.7 (36.9)	2.9 (37.2)	5.4 (41.7)	8.8 (47.8)	11.4 (52.5)	13.0 (55.4)	12.7 (54.9)	10.0 (50.0)	6.9 (44.4)	3.6 (38.5)	2.3 (36.1)	6.8 (44.2)
Daily mean °C (°F)	−0.2 (31.6)	0.5 (32.9)	0.6 (33.1)	3.0 (37.4)	5.9 (42.6)	8.8 (47.8)	10.4 (50.7)	10.1 (50.2)	7.6 (45.7)	4.7 (40.5)	1.3 (34.3)	0.1 (32.2)	4.4 (39.9)
Mean daily minimum °C (°F)	−2.8 (27.0)	−2.1 (28.2)	−2.1 (28.2)	0.5 (32.9)	3.3 (37.9)	6.6 (43.9)	8.1 (46.6)	7.8 (46.0)	5.0 (41.0)	2.2 (36.0)	−1.3 (29.7)	−2.5 (27.5)	1.9 (35.4)
Record low °C (°F)	−20.0 (−4.0)	−17.6 (0.3)	−18.0 (−0.4)	−18.0 (−0.4)	−7.7 (18.1)	−0.4 (31.3)	2.5 (36.5)	−1.2 (29.8)	−3.6 (25.5)	−10.7 (12.7)	−11.8 (10.8)	−17.1 (1.2)	−20.0 (−4.0)
Average precipitation mm (inches)	67.2 (2.65)	74.5 (2.93)	76.6 (3.02)	70.9 (2.79)	44.6 (1.76)	56.8 (2.24)	54.0 (2.13)	85.7 (3.37)	72.6 (2.86)	95.4 (3.76)	85.3 (3.36)	81.7 (3.22)	865.3 (34.07)
Source: Icelandic Meteorological Office

== Twin towns – sister cities ==
Akranes is twinned with:

- Bamble, Norway
- Närpes, Finland
- Qaqortoq, Greenland
- Sørvágur, Faroe Islands
- Tønder, Denmark
- Västervik, Sweden

== See also ==
- Akranes Museum Centre

== Gallery ==
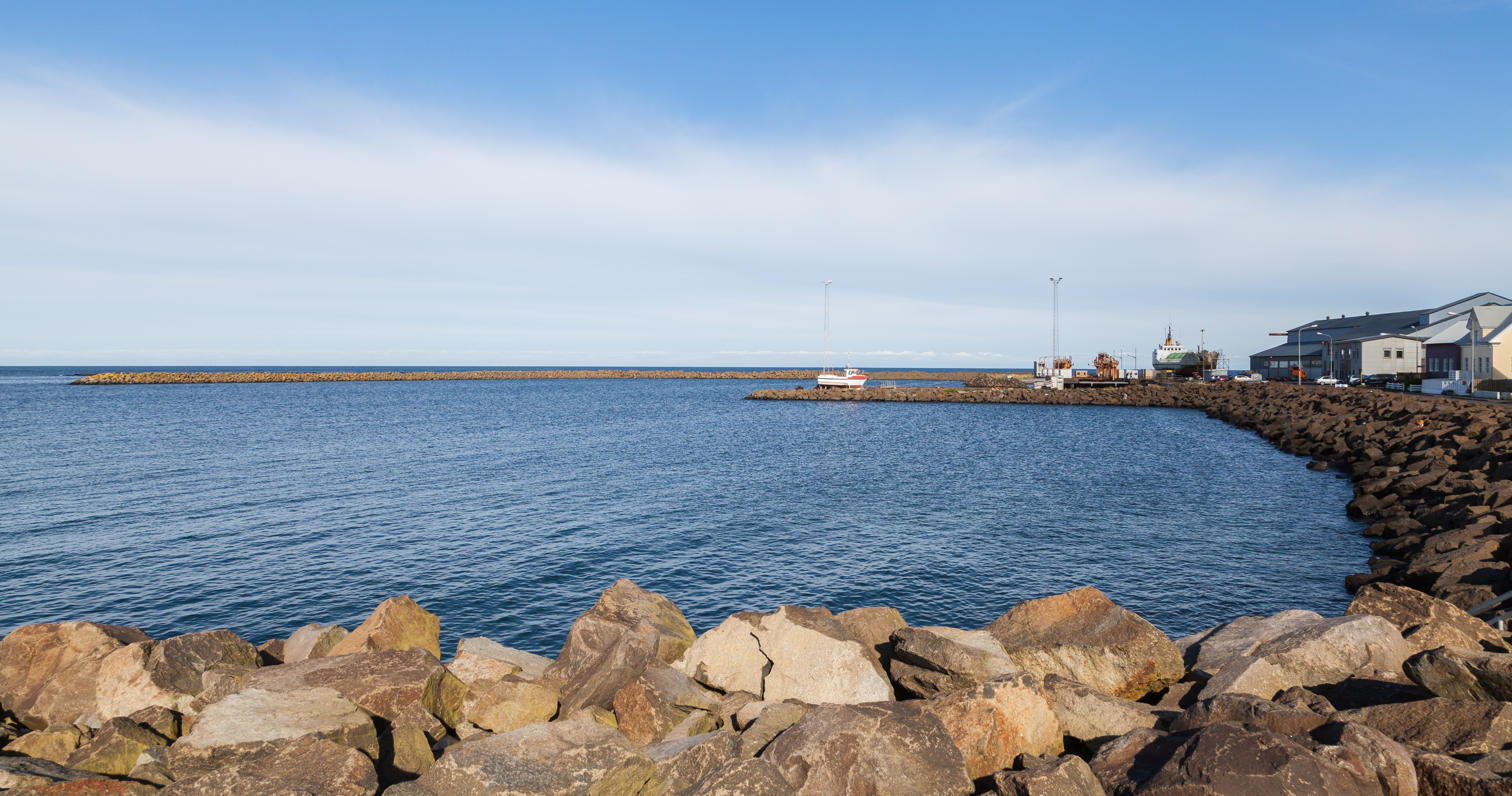
Akranes harbour

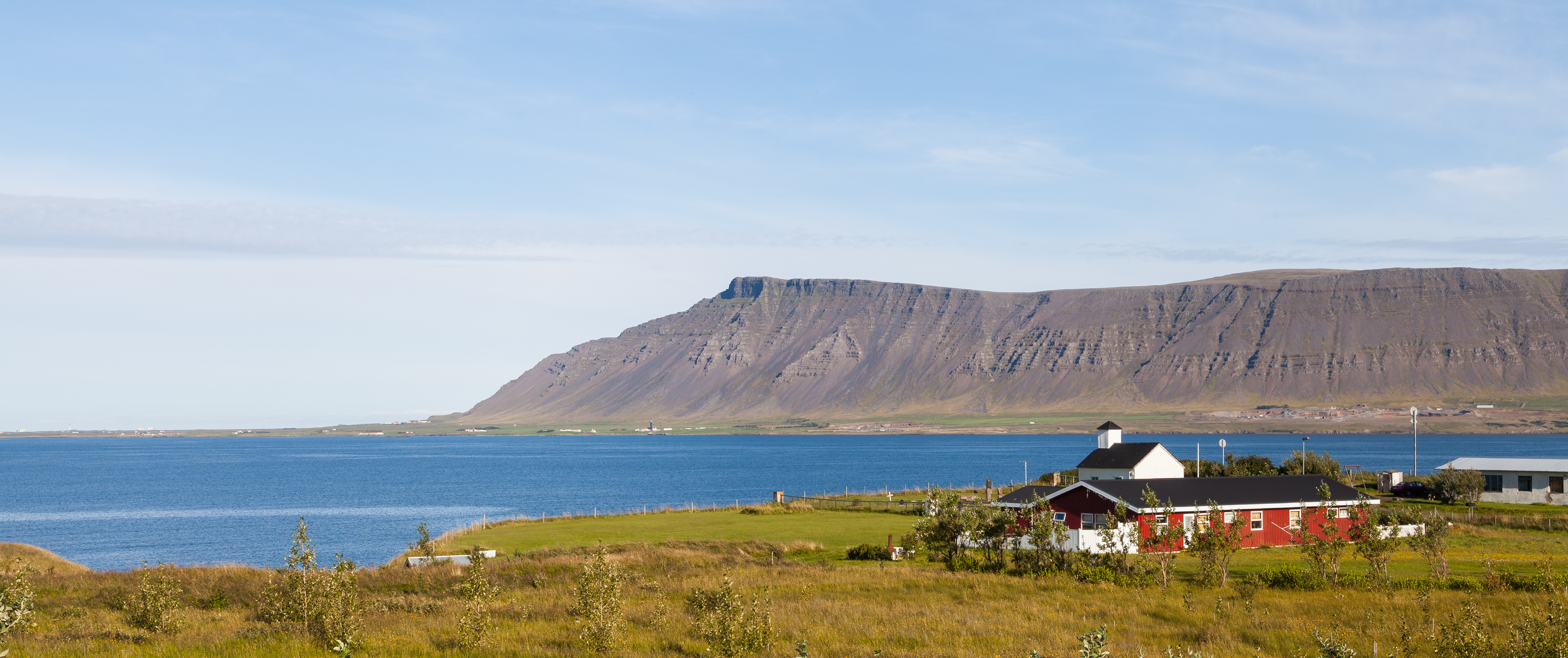
Akrafjall, located nearby

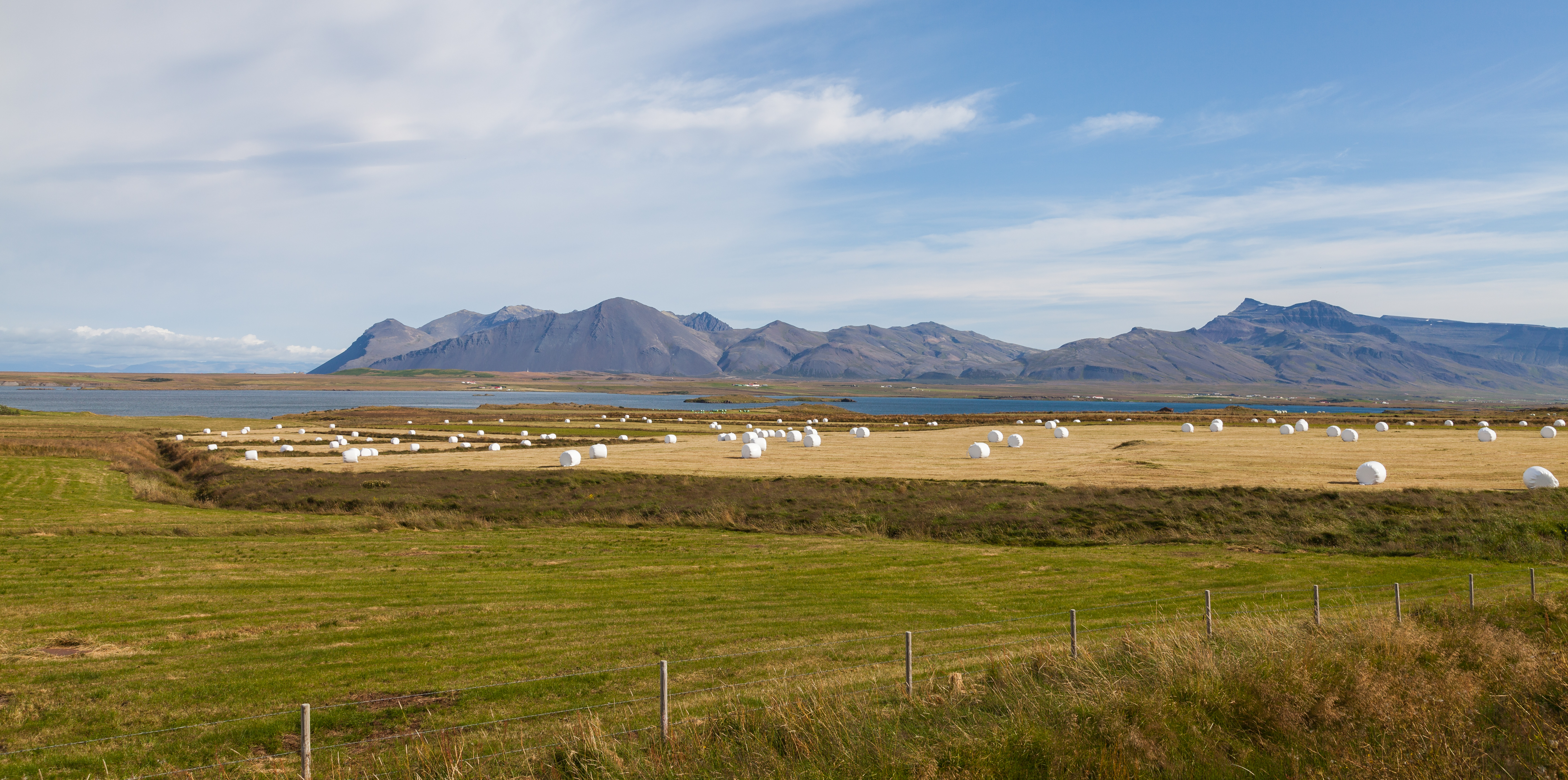
Straw bales near Akranes

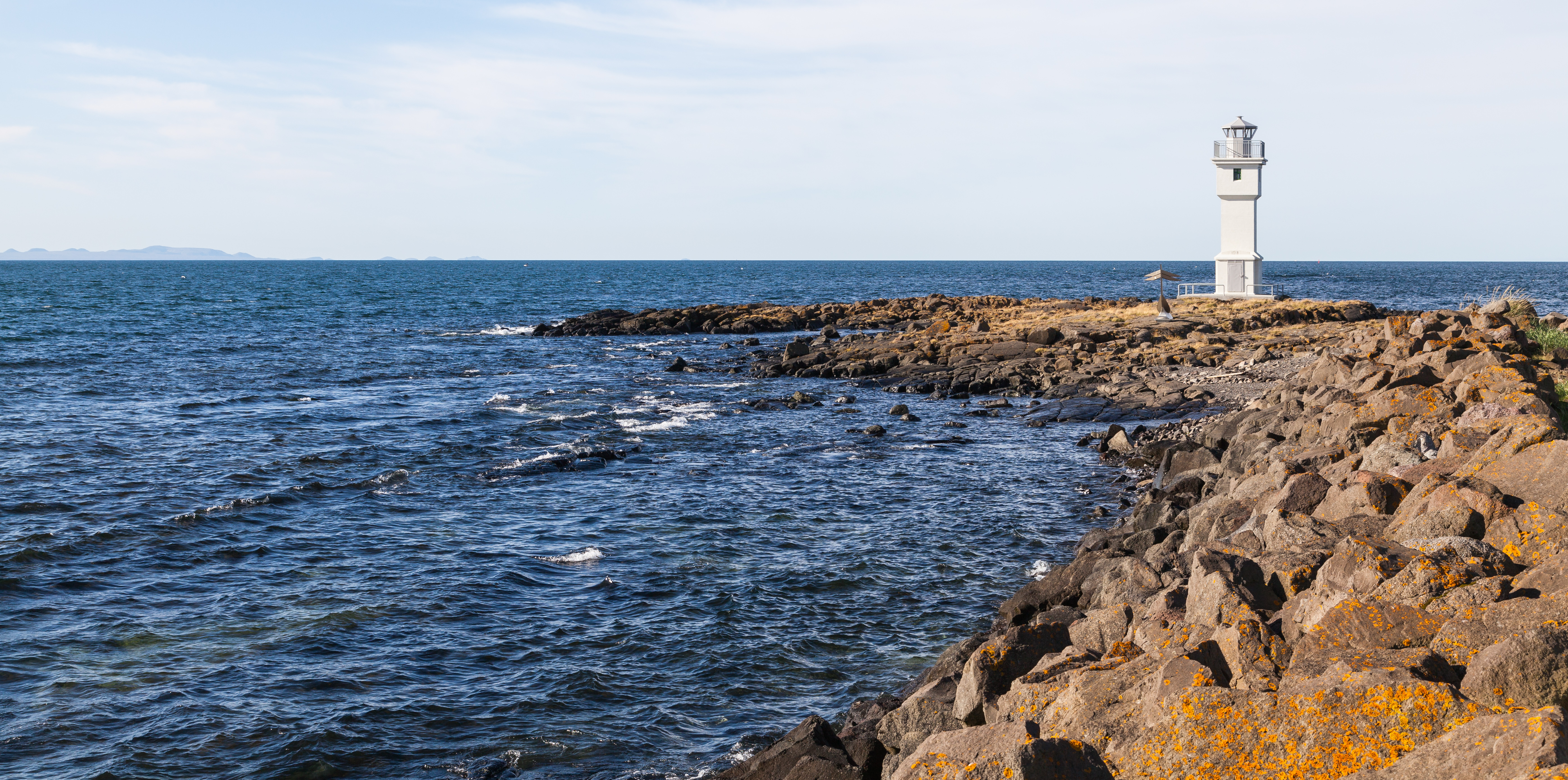
Old lighthouse of Akranes

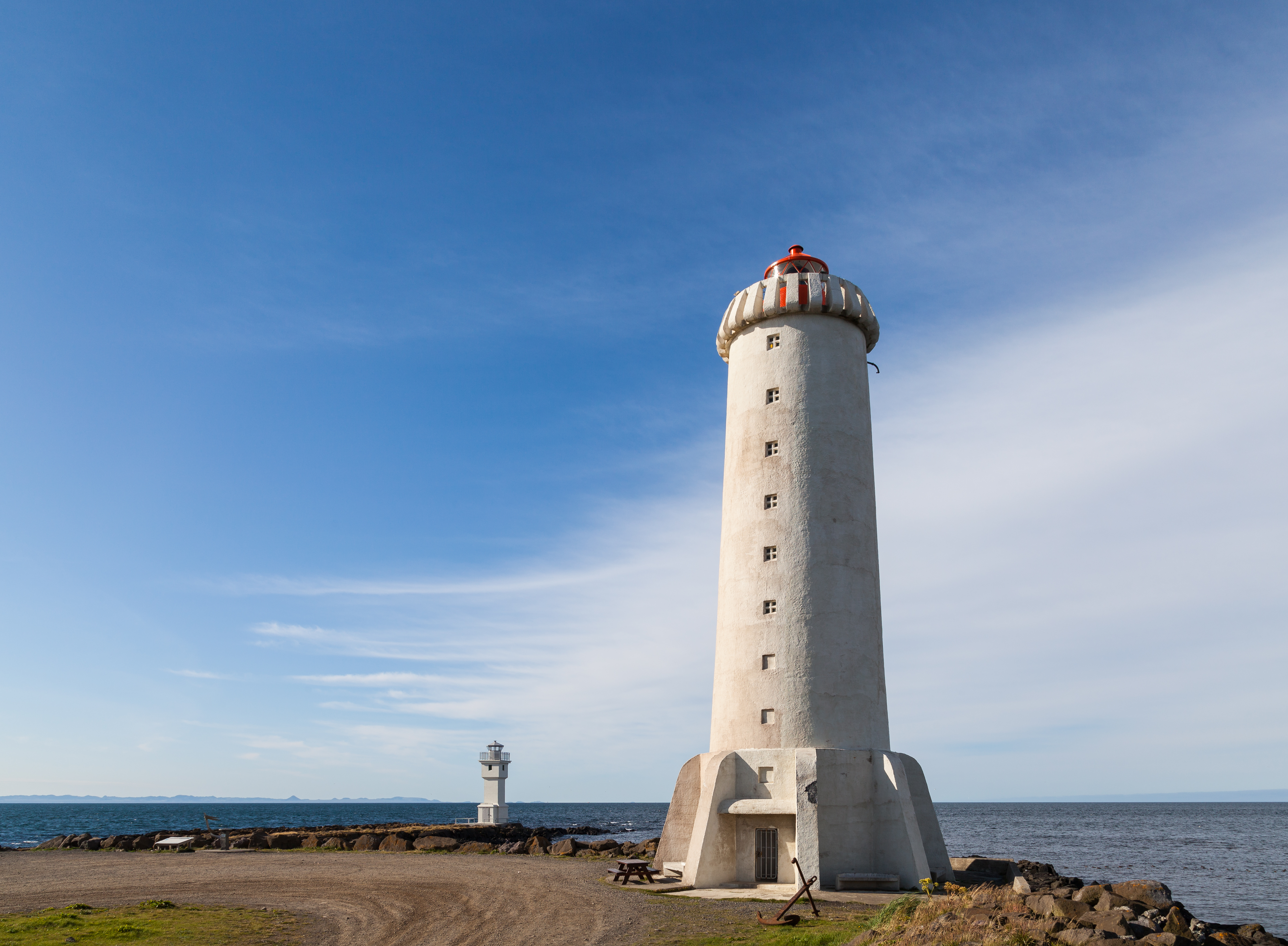
New lighthouse of Akranes
