= Sigfússon =

Sigfússon is an Icelandic and Faroese patronymic, meaning son of Sigfús. The anglicised version is Sigfusson. In Icelandic names, the name is not strictly a surname as it is not a family name. Notable people with this name include:

- Árni Sigfússon (contemporary), Icelandic businessman and local politician
- Hannes Sigfússon (1922–1997), Icelandic poet and writer
- Sæmundr Sigfússon (also Sæmundr fróði, 1056–1133), Icelandic priest and scholar
- Sigfús Sigfússon (1855–1935), Icelandic collector of folktales
- Skuli Sigfusson (1870–1969), Canadian politician from Manitoba; provincial legislator 1915–45
- Steingrímur J. Sigfússon (b. 1955), Icelandic politician; member of the Alþing since 1983; government minister
- Svein Sigfusson (1912–1922), Canadian athlete and entrepreneur
- Þorsteinn Ingi Sigfússon (1954–2019), Icelandic physicist
