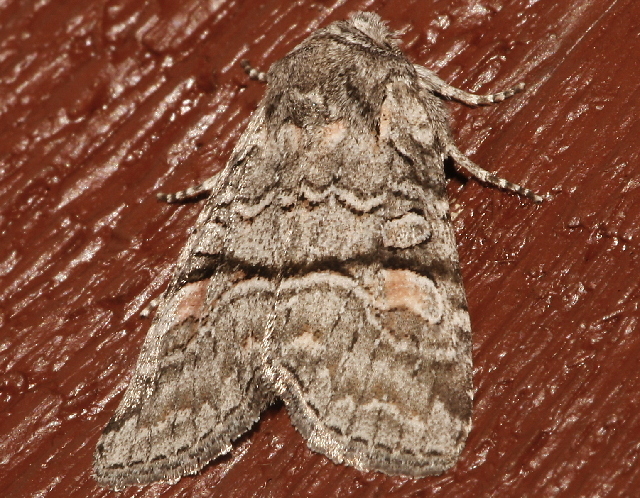

Scientific classification
- Domain: Eukaryota
- Kingdom: Animalia
- Phylum: Arthropoda
- Class: Insecta
- Order: Lepidoptera
- Superfamily: Noctuoidea
- Family: Noctuidae
- Tribe: Xylenini
- Subtribe: Xylenina
- Genus: Brachylomia
- Species: B. cascadia

Binomial name
- Brachylomia cascadia Troubridge & Lafontaine, 2007

= Brachylomia cascadia =

Species of moth

Brachylomia cascadia is a species of cutworm or dart moth in the family Noctuidae. It is found in North America.

The MONA or Hodges number for Brachylomia cascadia is 9995.2.
