= Brachylomia sierra =

Scientific classification
- Domain: Eukaryota
- Kingdom: Animalia
- Phylum: Arthropoda
- Class: Insecta
- Order: Lepidoptera
- Superfamily: Noctuoidea
- Family: Noctuidae
- Genus: Brachylomia
- Species: B. sierra

Binomial name
- Brachylomia sierra Troubridge & Lafontaine, 2007

Species of moth

Brachylomia sierra is a moth in the family Noctuidae, native to North America. The species was first described by James T. Troubridge and J. Donald Lafontaine in 2007.

The MONA or Hodges number for Brachylomia sierra is 9997.1.
