= Brachylomia elda =

Scientific classification
- Kingdom: Animalia
- Phylum: Arthropoda
- Clade: Pancrustacea
- Class: Insecta
- Order: Lepidoptera
- Superfamily: Noctuoidea
- Family: Noctuidae
- Genus: Brachylomia
- Species: B. elda

Binomial name
- Brachylomia elda (French, 1887)

Synonyms
- Homohadena elda French, 1887

Species of moth

Brachylomia elda is a moth of the family Noctuidae first described by George Hazen French in 1887. It is typically found west of the Rocky Mountains, from British Columbia south to California and Nevada. It was first identified at Upper Soda Springs, Siskiyou County, California.

Adults are on wing from June to September.
