= Jón Óskar =

Icelandic poet

Jón Óskar Ásmundsson (18 July 1921, in Akranes – 20 October 1998, in Reykjavík) was an Icelandic poet born in Akranes.

Jón Óskar is typically categorized as one of the Icelandic Atom Poets. In addition to poetry, short stories, literary articles, and a novel, he also produced a multi-volume biography. He was a musician and this influenced the sound of his poetry. Recurring themes in his work are daily life in general but also and in particular 'love'. He also translated some French poetry into Icelandic.
