= Tasmantrix tasmaniensis =

Scientific classification
- Kingdom: Animalia
- Phylum: Arthropoda
- Class: Insecta
- Order: Lepidoptera
- Family: Micropterigidae
- Genus: Tasmantrix
- Species: T. tasmaniensis

Binomial name
- Tasmantrix tasmaniensis Gibbs, 2010

Species of moth

Tasmantrix tasmaniensis is a moth of the family Micropterigidae. It is known from in wet forests of western Tasmania.

The forewing length is 3.7 mm for males.

== Etymology ==
The species name is derived from its geographic location in Tasmania.
