= Brachylomia populi =

Scientific classification
- Domain: Eukaryota
- Kingdom: Animalia
- Phylum: Arthropoda
- Class: Insecta
- Order: Lepidoptera
- Superfamily: Noctuoidea
- Family: Noctuidae
- Genus: Brachylomia
- Species: B. populi

Binomial name
- Brachylomia populi Strecker, 1898

Synonyms
- Cleoceris populi; Brachylomia albidior; Brachylomia contracta

Species of moth

Brachylomia populi is a moth of the family Noctuidae first described by Ferdinand Heinrich Hermann Strecker in 1898. It is found in the inland mountains of western North America, from British Columbia and Alberta and to the south through Colorado and Utah into Arizona.

The wingspan is about 30 mm.

Larvae feed on leaves of cottonwood and aspen in the genus Populus and are also reported on Quercus species.
