= Stefán Hörður Grímsson =

Icelandic writer (1919–2002)

Stefán Hörður Grímsson.

Stefán Hörður Grímsson (31 March 1919, Hafnarfjörður – 18 September 2002, Reykjavík) was an Icelandic modernist, one of the Atom Poets. His first book of poetry came out in 1946, but he gained attention for his second book of poems in 1951; he published four more books between 1970 and 1989.

== Works ==
- Glugginn snýr í norður (1946)
- Svartálfadans (1951)
- Hliðin á sléttunni (1970)
- Farvegir (1981)
- Tengsl (1987)
- Yfir heiðan morgun (1989)

== Legacy ==
In 1989, Stefán Hörður's book Tengsl was nominated for the Nordic Literature Prize. That same year, his book Yfir heiðan morgun won the Icelandic Literary Prize with it being the first book to win the award. His books have been translated into numerous languages including Danish, French, and Swedish. Most recently, his 1970 book Hliðin á sléttunni was translated into English and made available to read online.
