= Tasmantrix phalaros =

Scientific classification
- Kingdom: Animalia
- Phylum: Arthropoda
- Class: Insecta
- Order: Lepidoptera
- Family: Micropterigidae
- Genus: Tasmantrix
- Species: T. phalaros

Binomial name
- Tasmantrix phalaros Gibbs, 2010

Species of moth

Tasmantrix phalaros is a moth of the family Micropterigidae. It is known from eastern Australia in wet, upland eucalypt forests of northern New South Wales from Minyon Falls to Narara.

The species has dark purple forewings with a length of 3.6 mm for males and 3.5 mm for females, and a wingspan of roughly 0.8 cm
