= Lomilysis =

Scientific classification
- Domain: Eukaryota
- Kingdom: Animalia
- Phylum: Arthropoda
- Class: Insecta
- Order: Lepidoptera
- Superfamily: Noctuoidea
- Family: Noctuidae
- Subfamily: Cuculliinae
- Genus: Lomilysis; Franclemont, 1937

Single-species extinct genus of moths

Lomilysis was a genus of moths of the family Noctuidae. It was a monotypic genus. The single species of the genus Lomilysis discolor, is now known as Brachylomia discolor.
