= Brachylomia algens =

Scientific classification
- Kingdom: Animalia
- Phylum: Arthropoda
- Clade: Pancrustacea
- Class: Insecta
- Order: Lepidoptera
- Superfamily: Noctuoidea
- Family: Noctuidae
- Genus: Brachylomia
- Species: B. algens

Binomial name
- Brachylomia algens (Grote, 1878)

Species of moth

Brachylomia algens is a species of cutworm or dart moth in the family Noctuidae. It is found in North America.
