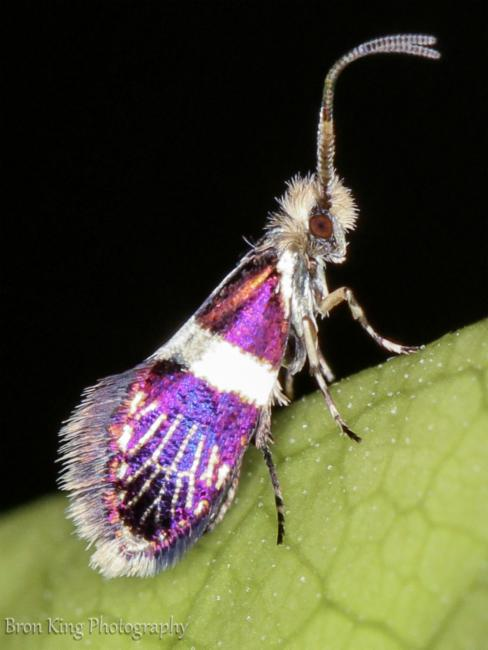

Scientific classification
- Kingdom: Animalia
- Phylum: Arthropoda
- Clade: Pancrustacea
- Class: Insecta
- Order: Lepidoptera
- Family: Micropterigidae
- Genus: Tasmantrix
- Species: T. nigrocornis

Binomial name
- Tasmantrix nigrocornis Gibbs, 2010

= Tasmantrix nigrocornis =

Species of moth

Tasmantrix nigrocornis is a moth of the family Micropterigidae. It is known from eastern Australia, in coastal rainforests of southern New South Wales from Mount Keira to Mount Dromedary.

The forewing length is 3.4 mm for males.

== Etymology ==
The species name is derived from the Latin niger- (meaning black) and -cornis (meaning horn) with reference to the striking black antennae of this species.
