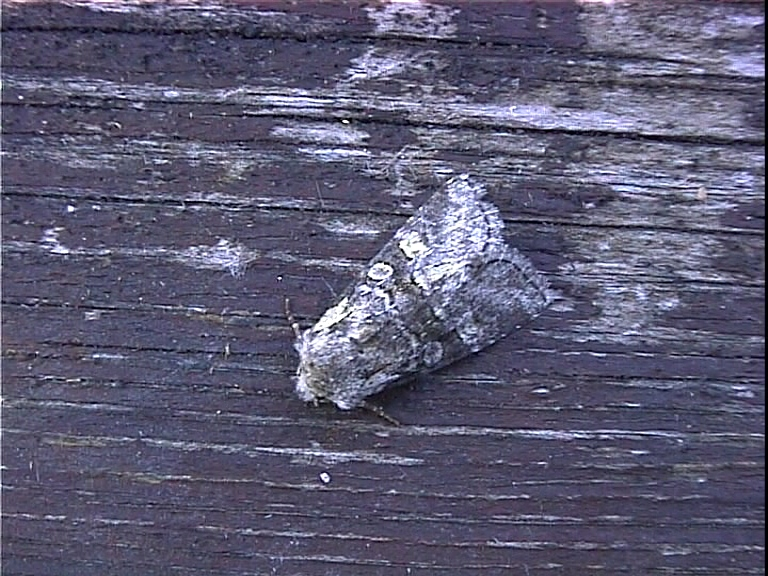

Scientific classification
- Kingdom: Animalia
- Phylum: Arthropoda
- Clade: Pancrustacea
- Class: Insecta
- Order: Lepidoptera
- Superfamily: Noctuoidea
- Family: Noctuidae
- Genus: Brachylomia
- Species: B. viminalis

Binomial name
- Brachylomia viminalis (Fabricius, 1776)

= Minor shoulder-knot =

Species of moth

The minor shoulder-knot (Brachylomia viminalis) is a moth of the family Noctuidae. The species was first described by Johan Christian Fabricius in 1776. It is distributed throughout Europe then east across the Palearctic to Siberia and Japan. It also occurs in Turkey.

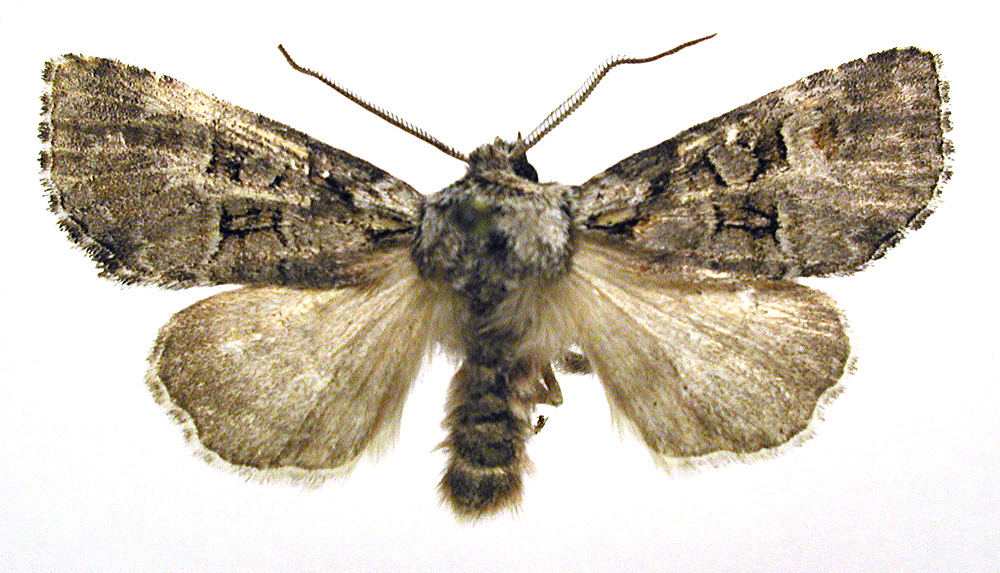
Mounted

This is a fairly small species with a wingspan of 29–34 mm. It usually has pale grey forewings with darker markings towards the base, including the prominent black mark at the root of the wing which gives the species its common name. However this is a variable species and darker forms exist, including examples of industrial melanism which are prevalent in some towns and cities. The characteristic basal markings are not usually apparent on such individuals. The hindwings are pale or dark grey. The species flies at night in July and August and is attracted to light and sugar, as well as various flowers.

== Technical description ==
Forewing dark or pale grey varied with fuscous; the base diffusely darker; the median shade broadly blackish; lines pale, approximating below middle, where they are conversely marked with black; a short black streak on base of submedian fold; claviform stigma long, black-edged, touching or connected with outer line; orbicular and reniform pale, with black outlines, the reniform sometimes white; submarginal line pale, preceded by a rufous grey shade; hindwing brownish grey; fringe pale, often rufous, like the lateral and anal tufts of abdomen; in saliceti Bkh. the inner half of wing is dark, limited by the median shade, the outer half much paler; ab. stricta Esp. is a grey or brown form, with the terminal area only pale, and the costal edge red; a rarer form of which, ab. rufescens ab. nov. [Warren], has the whole forewing and the underside of both wings suffused with rufous; obscura Stgr. is a darker common form, more uniformly dark grey, of which unicolor Tutt, from the north of England, a nearly black form, is an extreme development: scripta Hbn. the commonest form in the south of England, has the ground colour white or grey white; ab. suffusa ab nov. [Warren] is a form with the white forewing suffused with smoky brown obliterating the lines, and leaving only the stigmata with their black outlines visible.

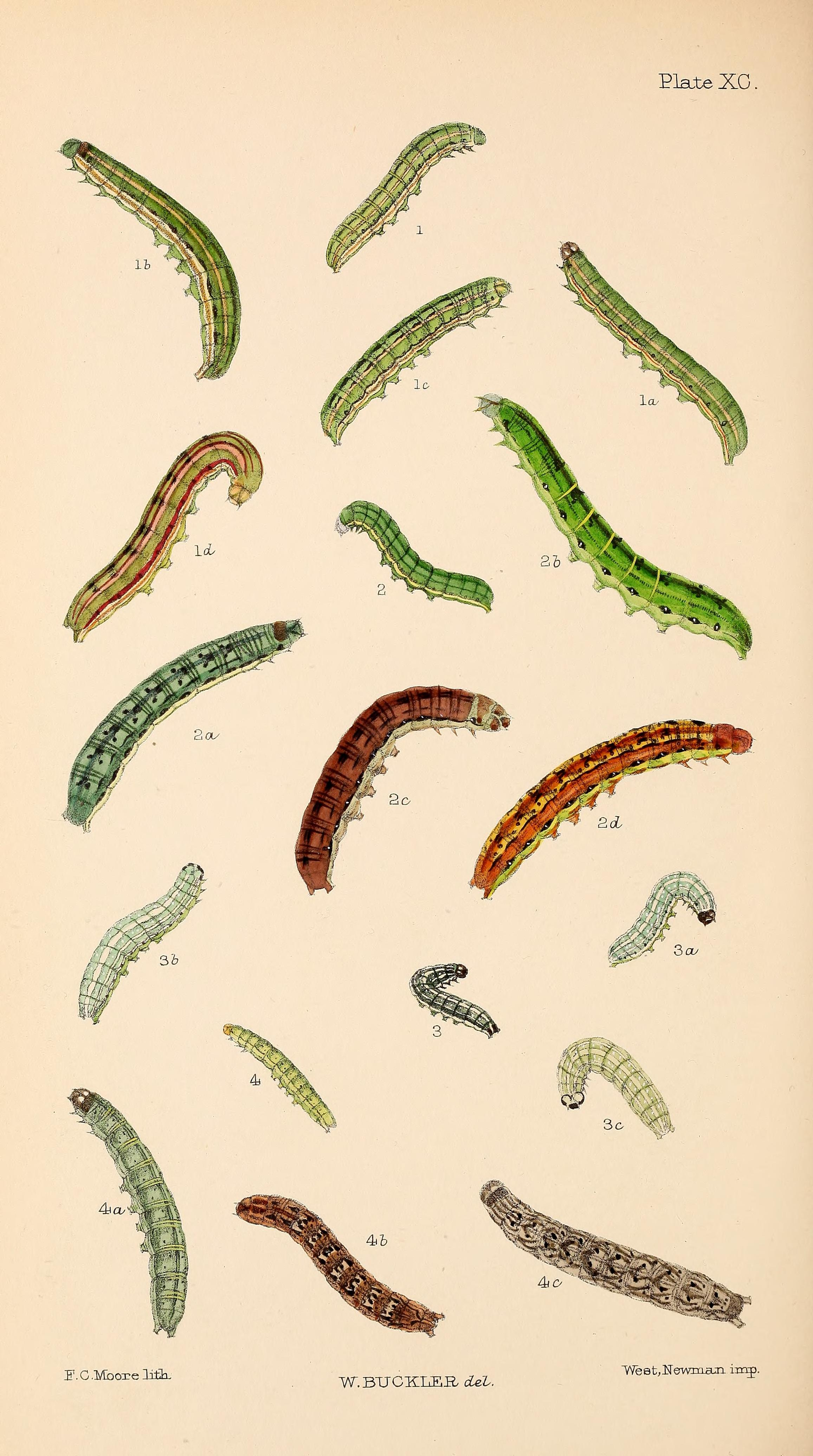
3, 3a, 3b, 3c larvae in various stages of growth

Larva whitish green, with all the lines whiter, and the tubercles whitish. The larva feeds on willows between united leaves spinning leaves together in order to feed undisturbed. The species overwinters as an egg.

1. The flight season refers to the British Isles. This may vary in other parts of the range.
