= Brachylomia rectifascia =

Scientific classification
- Kingdom: Animalia
- Phylum: Arthropoda
- Clade: Pancrustacea
- Class: Insecta
- Order: Lepidoptera
- Superfamily: Noctuoidea
- Family: Noctuidae
- Genus: Brachylomia
- Species: B. rectifascia

Binomial name
- Brachylomia rectifascia Smith, 1891

Synonyms
- Dryobota rectifascia

Species of moth

Brachylomia rectifascia is a moth of the family Noctuidae first described by Smith in 1891. It is found in western North America from British Columbia to central California, east to Colorado.

The wingspan is about 32 mm. The moth flies from August to September depending on the location.

The larvae feed on the leaves of various flowering trees and shrubs.
