= Brachylomia curvifascia =

Scientific classification
- Domain: Eukaryota
- Kingdom: Animalia
- Phylum: Arthropoda
- Class: Insecta
- Order: Lepidoptera
- Superfamily: Noctuoidea
- Family: Noctuidae
- Genus: Brachylomia
- Species: B. curvifascia

Binomial name
- Brachylomia curvifascia Smith, 1891

Synonyms
- Bombycia curvifascia; Dryobota curvifascia

Species of moth

Brachylomia curvifascia is a moth of the family Noctuidae first described by Smith in 1891. It is found in western North America from British Columbia south to California.

Adults are on wing from August to September in California.
