= Tasmantrix fragilis =

Scientific classification
- Domain: Eukaryota
- Kingdom: Animalia
- Phylum: Arthropoda
- Class: Insecta
- Order: Lepidoptera
- Family: Micropterigidae
- Genus: Tasmantrix
- Species: T. fragilis

Binomial name
- Tasmantrix fragilis Gibbs, 2010

Species of moth

Tasmantrix fragilis is a moth of the family Micropterigidae from eastern Australia. It is known only from a single locality in the Shoalhaven catchment in New South Wales.

The forewing length is 2.7 mm for males.
