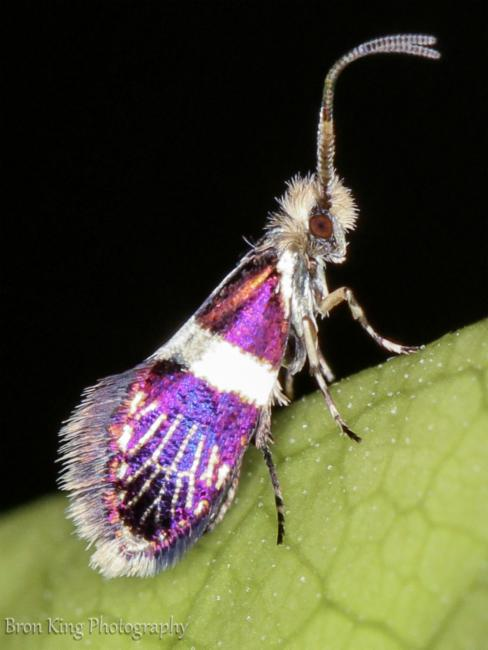

Scientific classification
- Kingdom: Animalia
- Phylum: Arthropoda
- Class: Insecta
- Order: Lepidoptera
- Family: Micropterigidae
- Genus: Tasmantrix
- Species: T. calliplaca

Binomial name
- Tasmantrix calliplaca (Meyrick, 1922)

Synonyms
- Palaeomicra calliplaca Meyrick, 1902; Sabatinca calliplaca

= Tasmantrix calliplaca =

Species of moth

Tasmantrix calliplaca is a moth of the Micropterigidae family. It is known from eastern Australia, in coastal rainforest from Finch Hatton Gorge, Eungella Range in Queensland to Elizabeth Beach in New South Wales.

The forewing length is 2.9 mm for males and 3.3 mm for females.
