= Tasmantrix =

Scientific classification
- Kingdom: Animalia
- Phylum: Arthropoda
- Clade: Pancrustacea
- Class: Insecta
- Order: Lepidoptera
- Family: Micropterigidae
- Genus: Tasmantrix; Gibbs, 2010

Species
- see text.

Genus of moths in family Micropterigidae

Tasmantrix is a genus of small primitive metallic moths in the family Micropterigidae.

== Species ==
- Tasmantrix calliplaca (Meyrick, 1922)
- Tasmantrix fragilis Gibbs, 2010
- Tasmantrix lunaris Gibbs, 2010
- Tasmantrix nigrocornis Gibbs, 2010
- Tasmantrix phalaros Gibbs, 2010
- Tasmantrix tasmaniensis Gibbs, 2010
- Tasmantrix thula Gibbs, 2010
