= Akranes Folk Museum =

Coordinates: 64.3199°N 22.0450°W

- Byggðasafnið í Görðum Akranesi
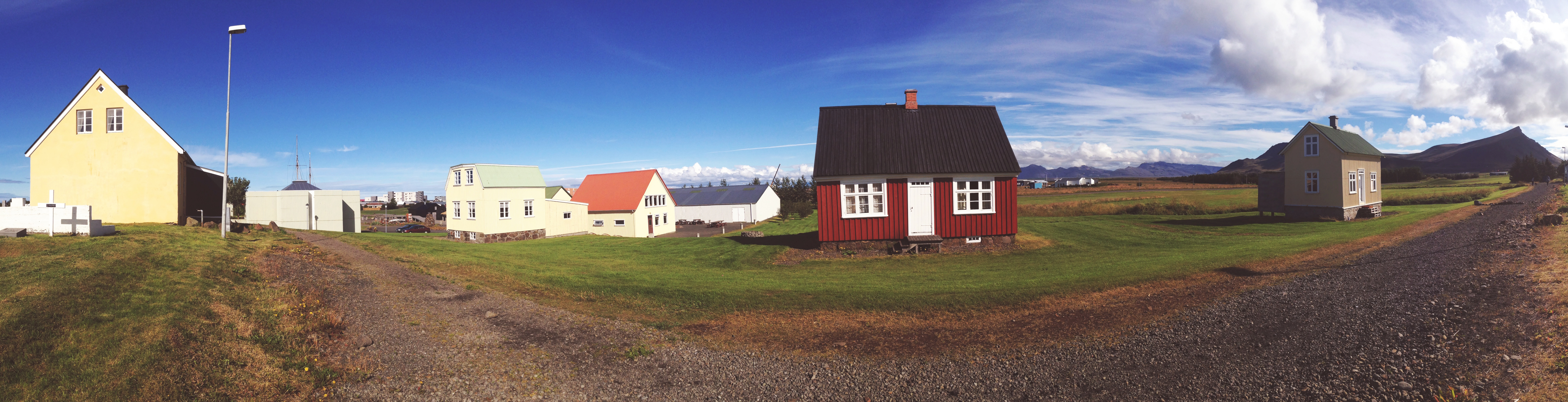
- Former name: Akranes Museum Centre (Safnasvæðið á Akranesi)
- Established: 1959
- Location: Garðaholt 3, Akranes, Iceland
- Type: Museum
- Public transit access: Bus route 57
- Website: www.museum.is

The Akranes Folk Museum (Icelandic: Byggðasafnið í Görðum Akranesi [ˈpɪɣðaˌsapnɪð i ˈkœrðʏm ˈaːkraˌnɛːsɪ]), formerly known as the Akranes Museum Centre (Safnasvæðið á Akranesi [ˈsapnaˌsvaiːðɪð au ˈaːkraˌnɛːsɪ]), consists of a folk museum, an exhibition hall and a few 19th century buildings and boats in Garðar, Akranes, Iceland. The museum houses a few exhibitions, as well as a large open-air museum, which consists mainly of houses and boats, including the old Garðar house and the 86-tonne ketch Sigurfari (Kútter Sigurfari).

The main purpose of the Akranes Folk Museum is to collect, register, preserve, research and display artefacts and other objects of cultural and historical value for the Akranes area and Iceland. The Akranes Folk Museum is located at Garðar in Akranes, near the town's cemetery. It is easily accessible from Reykjavík via car or bus route 57.

== History ==
The history of the Akranes Folk Museum dates back to 1959, when the museum was founded. Ten years prior, local pastor Jón M. Guðjónsson had started collecting artefacts from the Akranes area. By the time the museum was opened he had already collected between 1500 and 2000 artefacts. Originally located in the old Garðar house, the museum moved to a new location in 1974. The old Garðar house is now part of the museum's house collection.

== Attractions ==
The 86-tonne, two masted ketch Sigurfari (Kútter Sigurfari) is arguably the museum's most notable artefact, located outside the main museum building. Sigurfari was built in England in 1885, out of oak. It was used for fishing in Iceland until 1919 and in the Faroe Islands until the 1970s. Sigurfari is the only preserved ship of its kind in Iceland. Formerly open to the public, Sigurfari is now unsafe to board and is in need of restoration.

The Akranes Folk Museum preserves and exhibits examples from the past of everyday life in the Akranes area. The museum's collection includes household items, various tools and machinery used by craftsmen, farmers and fishermen, medical equipment, costumes, part of a turf house, etc.

The museum's house collection consists of several 19th and 20th century houses from the Akranes area. Most of the houses have been relocated to the museum area from their original locations. An exception is the old Garðar house, where the Folk Museum was originally housed. This house was built in 1876 as a parsonage and is the oldest house made of concrete in Iceland. The Garðar house is open to the public, as well as Neðri-Sýrupartur, Sandar-Vestri and the Folk Museum building. Garðar depicts a late 19th to early 20th century upper-class Icelandic home.

The other houses are Sandar-Vestri, a working-class family home built in 1901; Neðri-Sýrupartur, the oldest preserved timber house in Akranes built in 1875; Geirsstaðir, a home and preschool built in 1903; Fróðá, a net and sail workshop built in 1938; Stúkuhúsið, an IOGT meeting house that was originally built as a barn in 1916.

== Opening hours ==
The Akranes Folk Museum is open every day between 10:00 and 17:00 during the Summer (15 May – 15 September) and offers a guided tour on weekdays at 14:00 all year round, including the Winter season (16 September – 14 May). It is possible to book guided tours outside opening hours. An insight into the museum's daily events is available on the Akranes Folk Museum Facebook page.

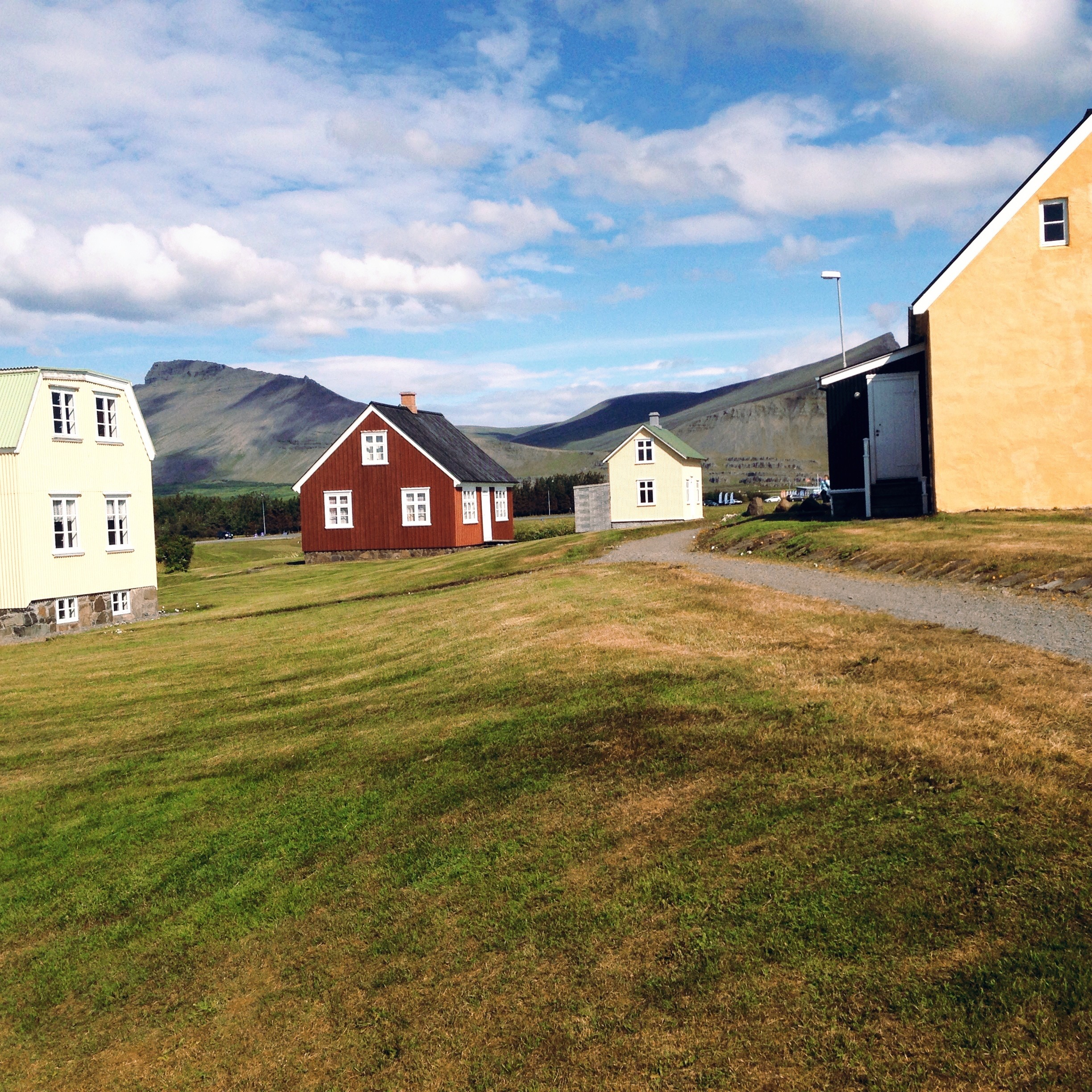
The houses

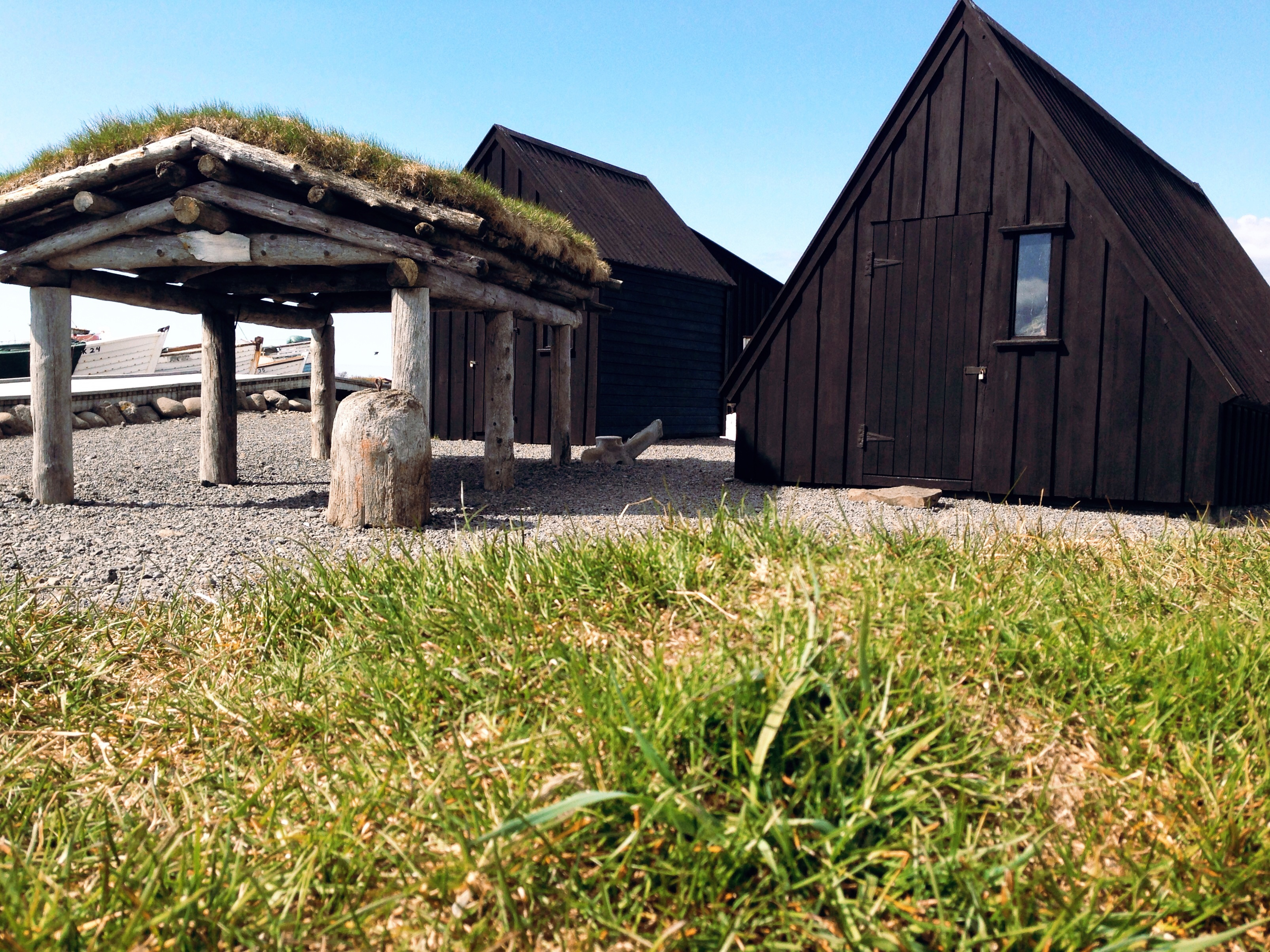
A boathouse and a drying shed

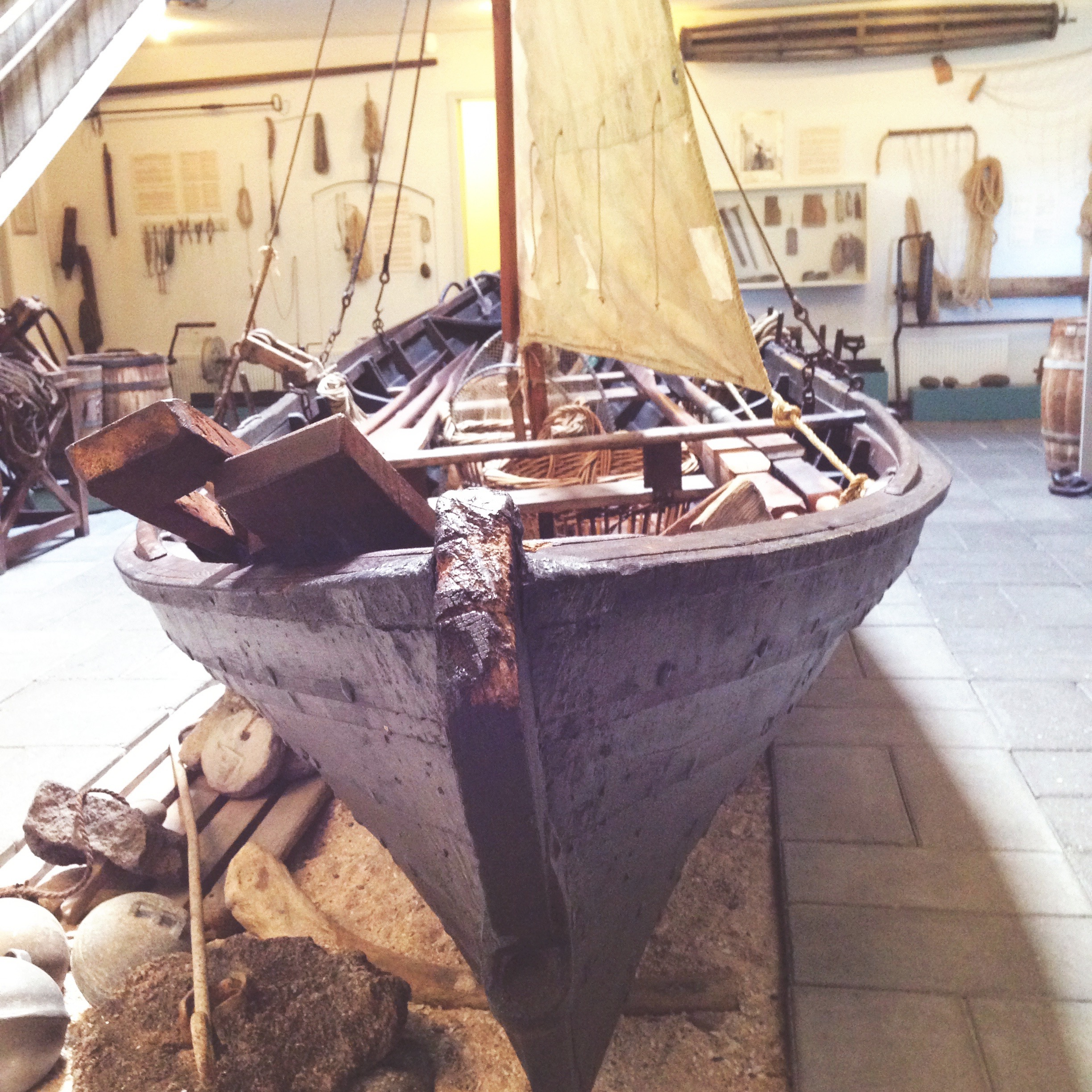
Sæunn the row boat

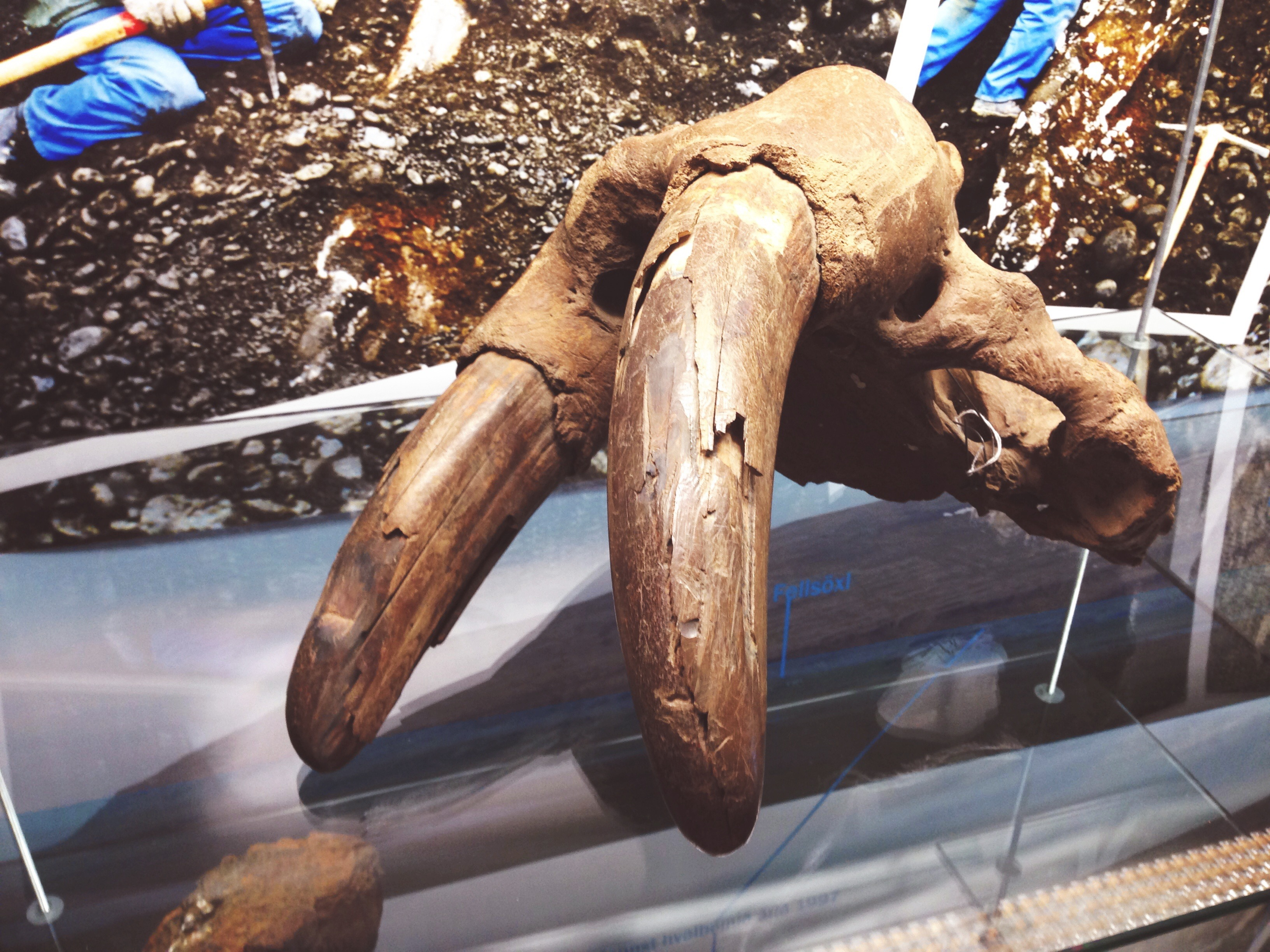
A walrus skull

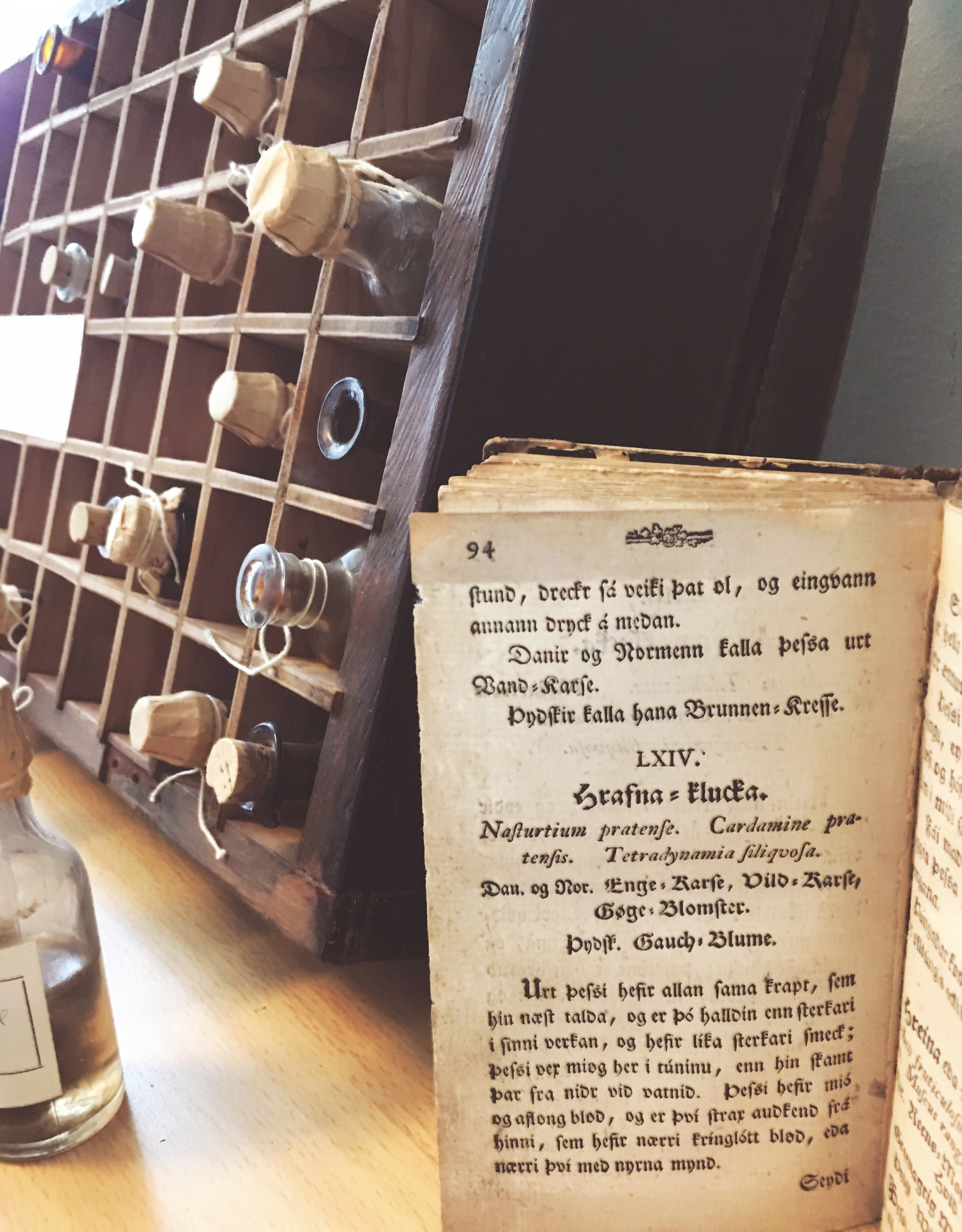
A book of herbal medicine

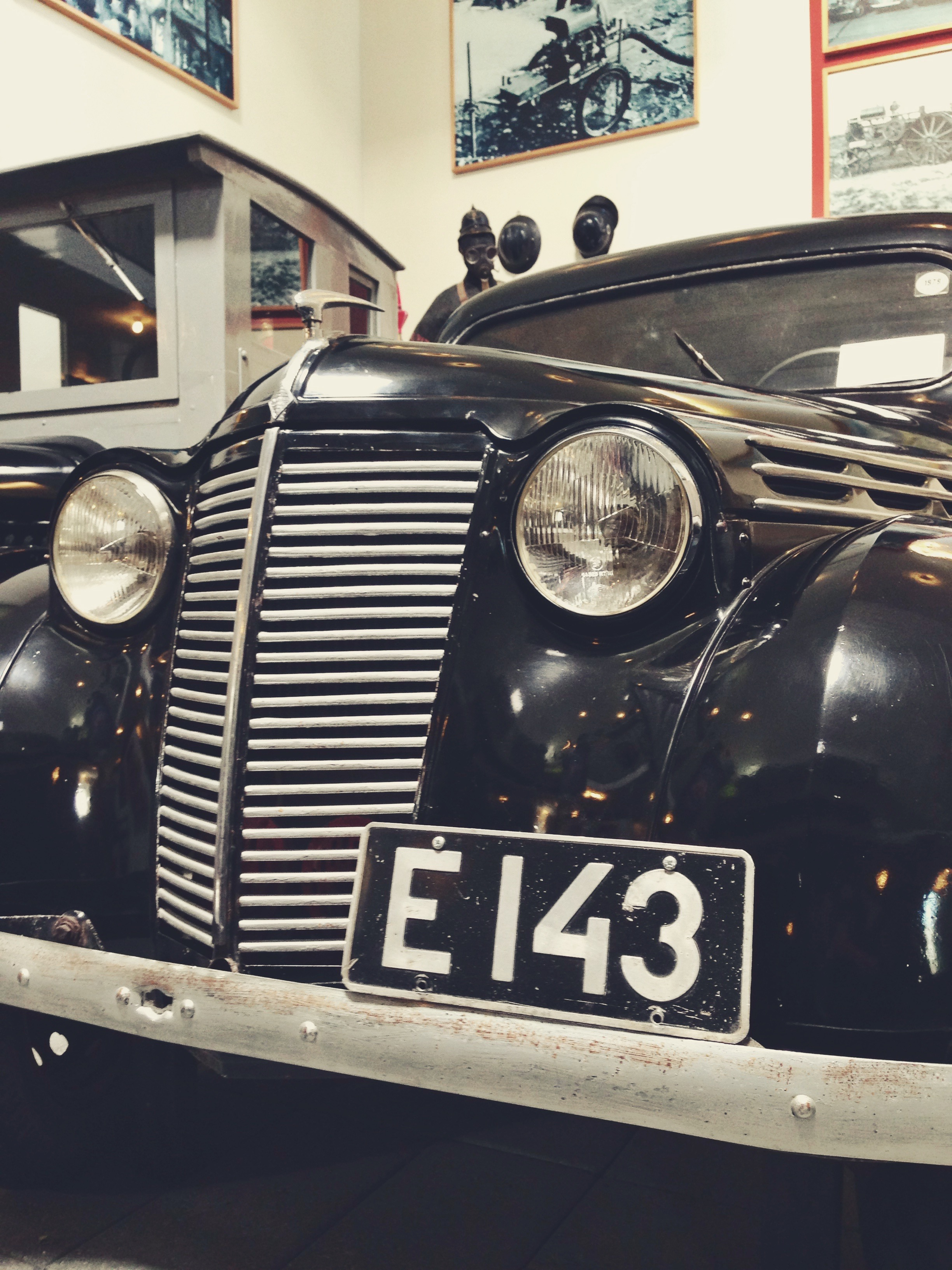
A 1946 Renault

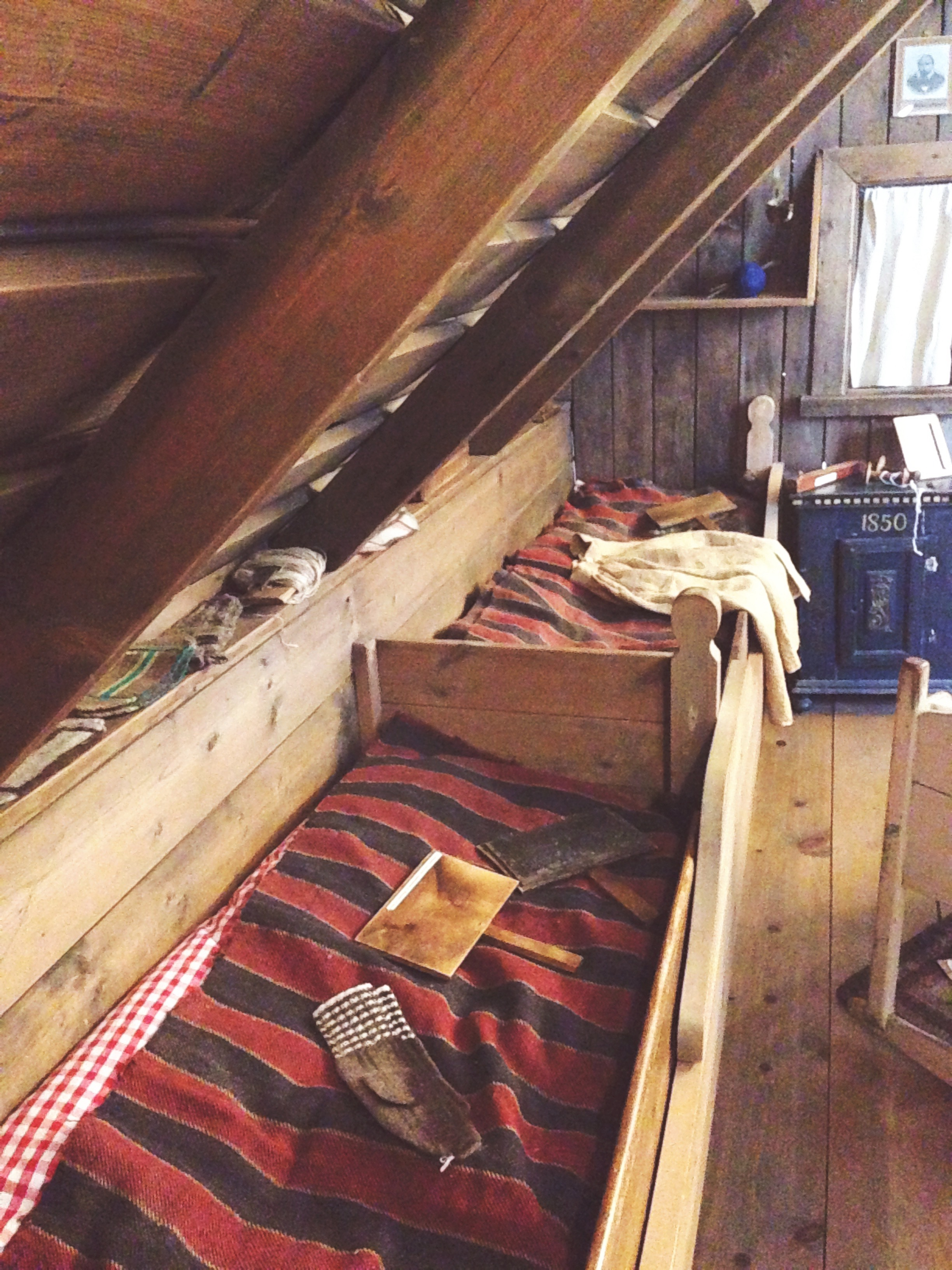
A traditional baðstofa from a turfhouse

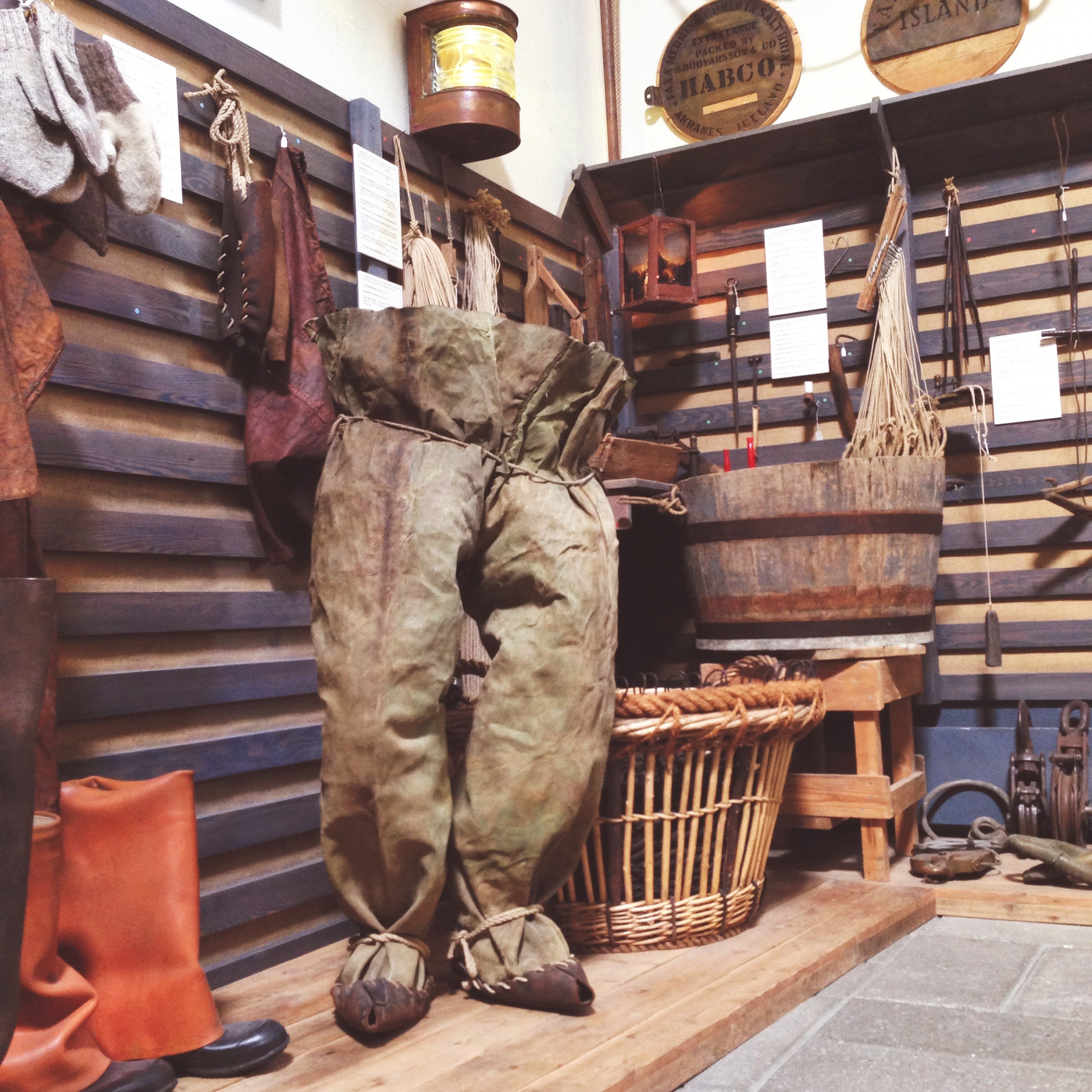
Sheepskin trousers

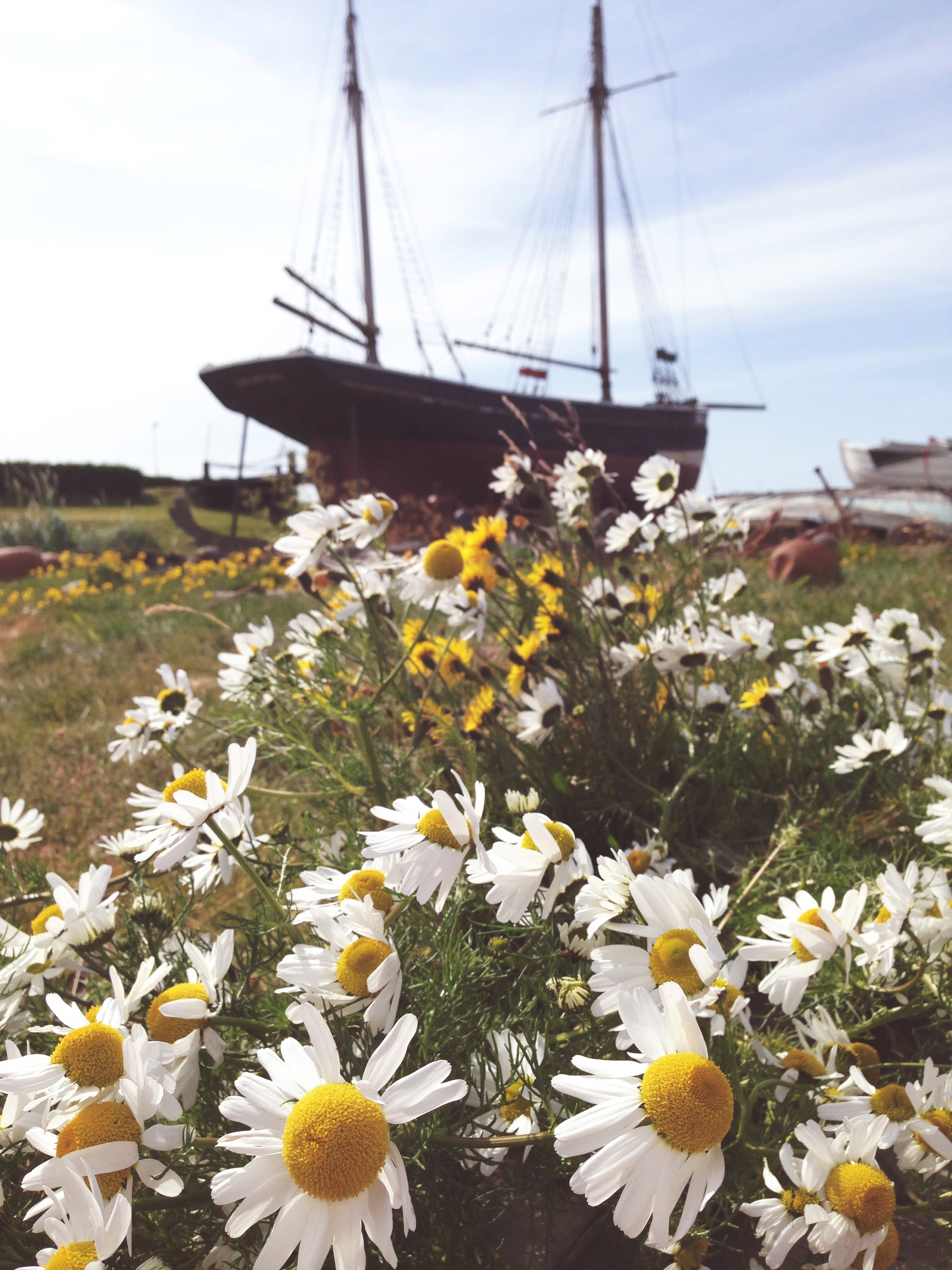
Kútter Sigurfari - Ketch Sigurfari

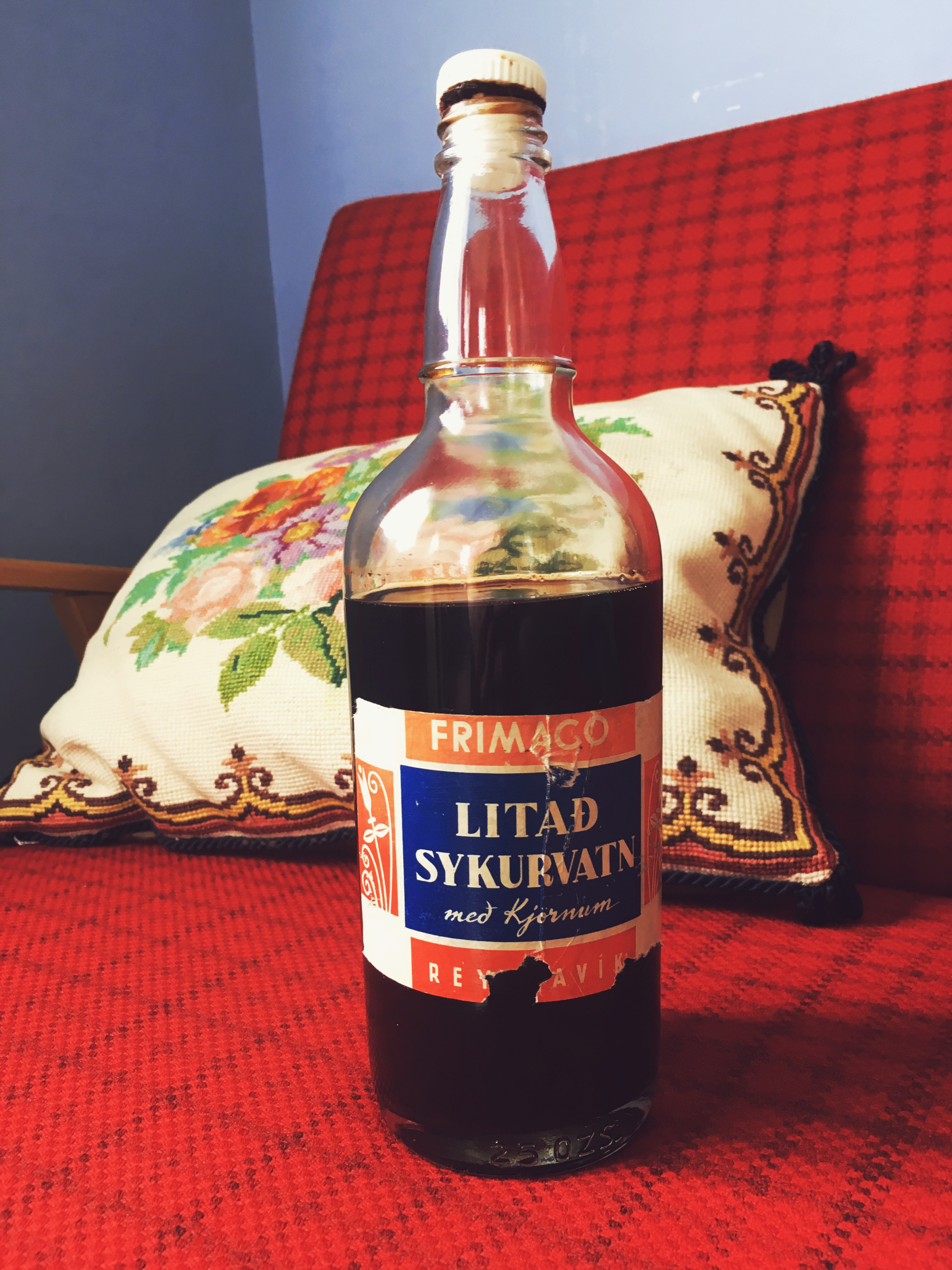
Litað sykurvatn með kjörnum - Dyed sugary water with flavouring

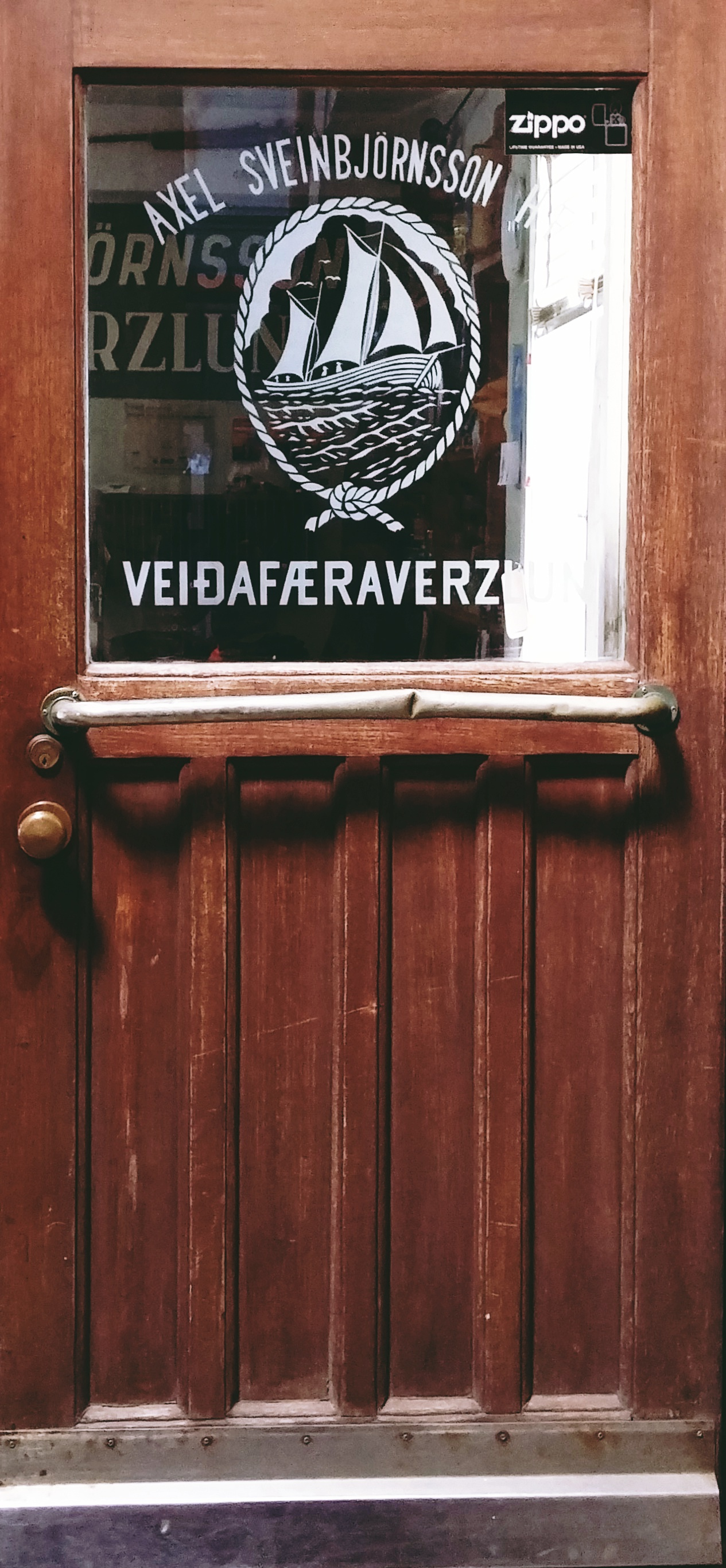
Axelsbúð - Axel's store

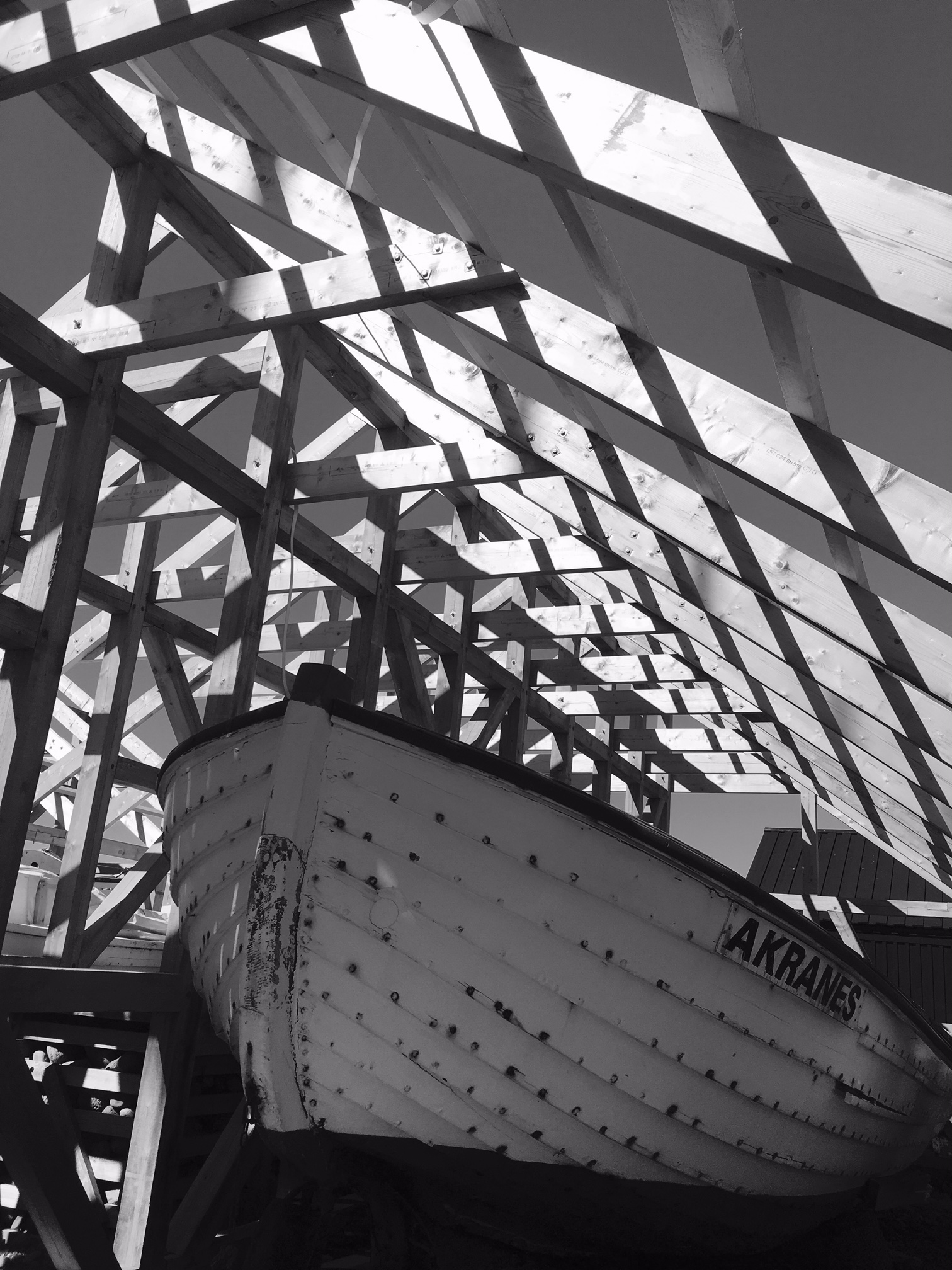
The new boathouse

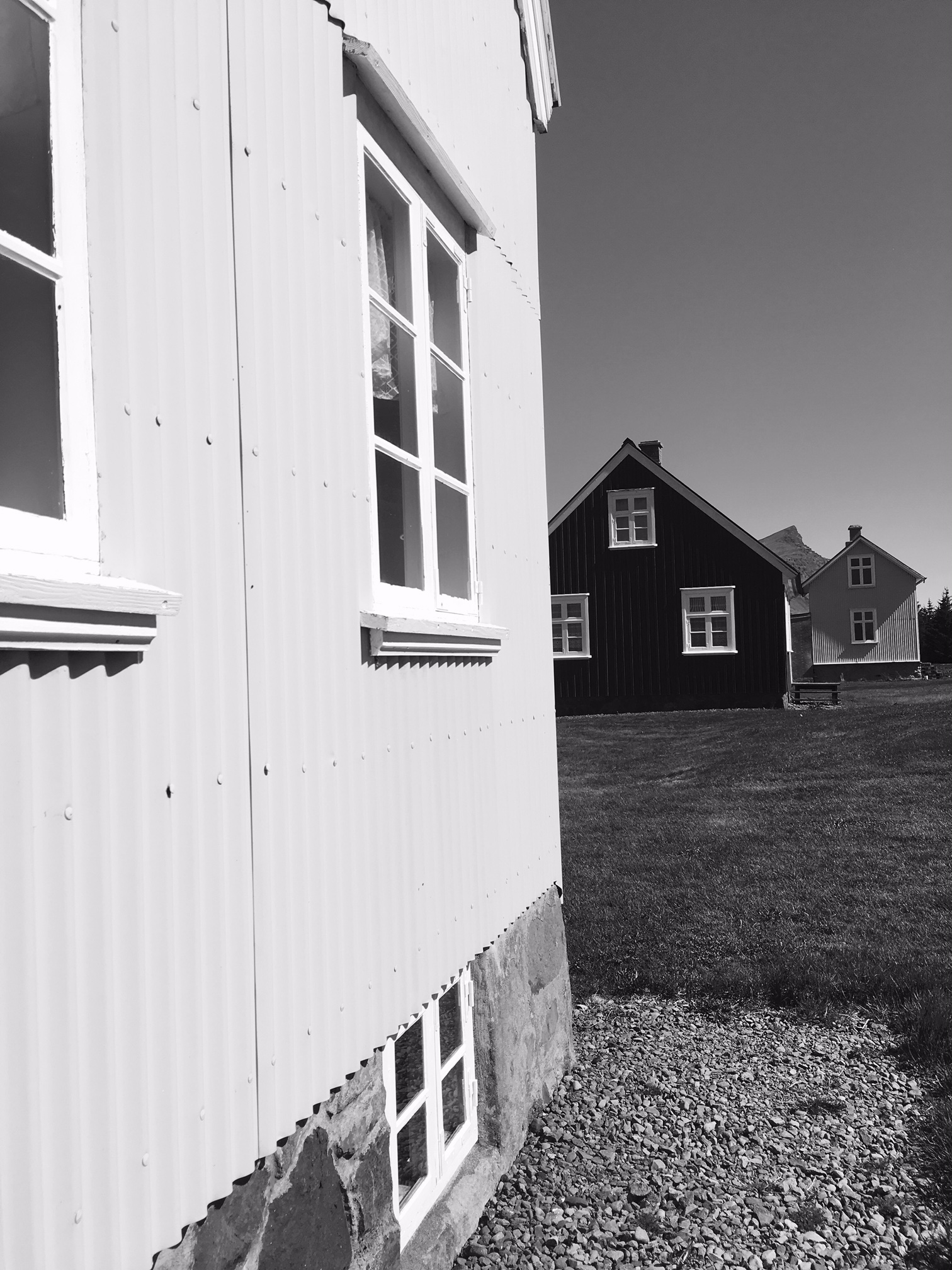
Sandar-Vestri, Neðri-Sýrupartur, Geirsstaðir
