= Tasmantrix lunaris =

Scientific classification
- Domain: Eukaryota
- Kingdom: Animalia
- Phylum: Arthropoda
- Class: Insecta
- Order: Lepidoptera
- Family: Micropterigidae
- Genus: Tasmantrix
- Species: T. lunaris

Binomial name
- Tasmantrix lunaris Gibbs, 2010

Species of moth

Tasmantrix lunaris is a moth of the family Micropterigidae. It is known from eastern Australia, where it is known from two localities in the southern coastal forests of New South Wales.

The forewing length is 3.2 mm for males and 3.1 mm for females.
