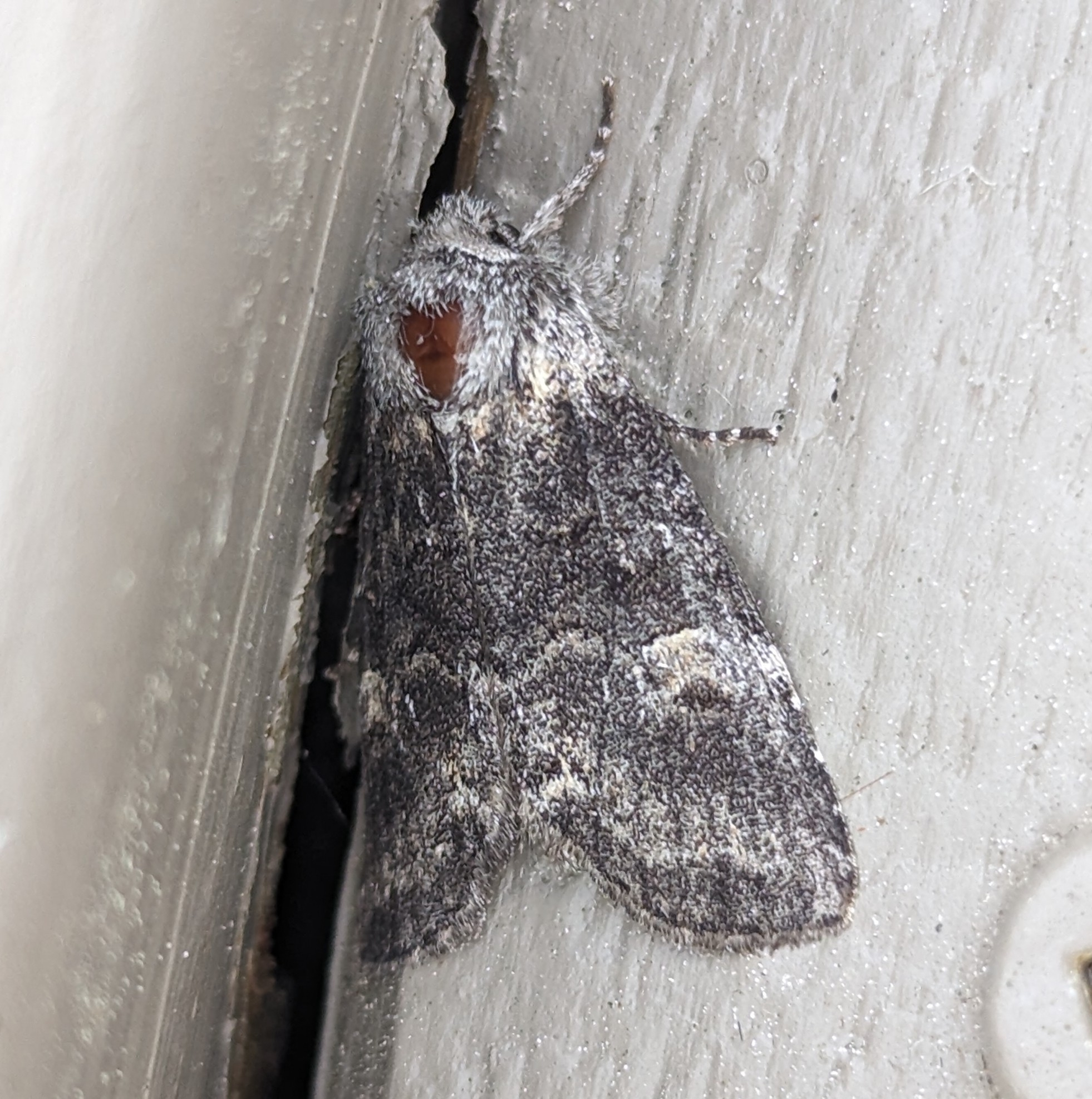

Scientific classification
- Kingdom: Animalia
- Phylum: Arthropoda
- Class: Insecta
- Order: Lepidoptera
- Superfamily: Noctuoidea
- Family: Noctuidae
- Genus: Brachylomia
- Species: B. discinigra

Binomial name
- Brachylomia discinigra Walker, 1856

Synonyms
- Bryophila discinigra; Cleoceris discinigra; Hillia discinigra

= Brachylomia discinigra =

Species of moth

Brachylomia discinigra is a species of moth in the family Noctuidae that was first described by Francis Walker in 1856. It is found across Canada from New Brunswick to British Columbia and in adjacent parts of the United States.

The wingspan is about 31 mm, the species is nocturnal and is active in the late summer to early fall across its habitat range.
