= Brachylomia thula =

Scientific classification
- Domain: Eukaryota
- Kingdom: Animalia
- Phylum: Arthropoda
- Class: Insecta
- Order: Lepidoptera
- Superfamily: Noctuoidea
- Family: Noctuidae
- Genus: Brachylomia
- Species: B. thula

Binomial name
- Brachylomia thula (Strecker, 1898)

Synonyms
- Hadena thula Strecker, 1898

Species of moth

Brachylomia thula is a moth of the family Noctuidae. It is found from British Columbia to southern Oregon in and west of the Cascade Range.
