= Hannes Sigfússon =

Icelandic poet and writer

Hannes Sigfússon (1922–1997) was an Icelandic poet and writer.

He was an editor of Birtingur, the journal of the Atom Poets. In addition to his poetry, Sigfússon published novels and memoirs and was active as a translator.

== Selected works ==
- Dymbilvaka. 1949
- Imbrudagar. 1951
- Strandið : skáldsaga. 1955.
- Sprek á eldinn. 1961
- Kyrjálaheiði. 1995
