= Sigfús Daðason =

Icelandic poet (1928–1996)

Sigfús Daðason (1928–1996) was one of the more notable 20th-century Icelandic poets. It has been claimed that Daðason "changed the poetic landscape in Iceland". He was one of the pioneers of the Modern movement.

Daðason published his first book of poetry in 1957, and followed this a year later with an influential essay, 'Defence of Poetry', on new trends in poetry. He spent eight years in France studying the Latin language, culture, and French and German literature at the Sorbonne. On his return to Iceland, Daðason edited a cultural review and worked as a publisher. He wrote many essays on literature and culture as well as his books of poetry.

Daðason has been categorised as one of the 'Atom Poets'.

== Work ==
- Ljóð (1951)
- Hendur og orð (1959)
- Fáein ljóð (1977)
- Útlínur bak við minnið (1987)
- Maðurinn og skáldið (1987)
- Province í endursýn (1992)
- Og hugleiða steina (1955)
- Ljóð 1947 - 1996 (2008)
