= Thula Baba Box =

South African prototype babycare product

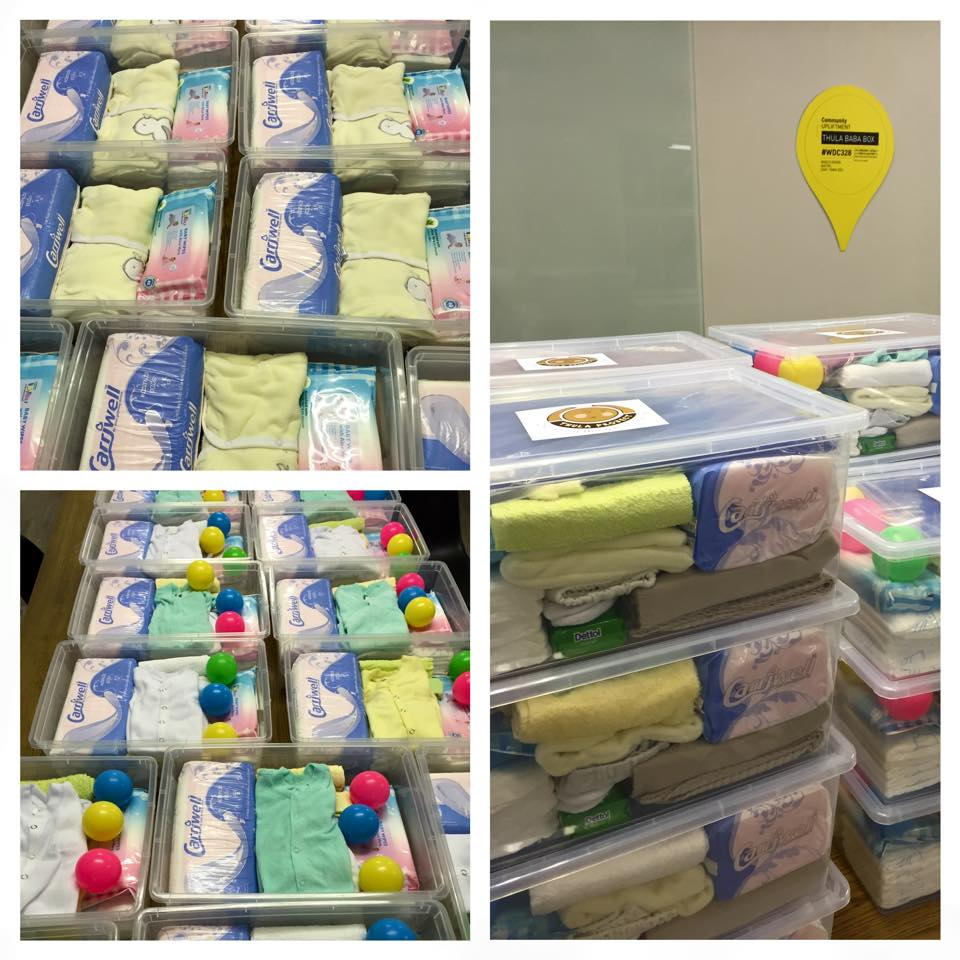

Contents
- Baby products, Information brochures on babies, Baby clothes, Washing Items, Basic medicine and Toys

The Thula Baba Box is a South African prototype product that is inspired by a Maternity Package created in Finland. Although Finland once had high infant mortality rates 50+ years ago, Finland now has one of the lowest infant mortality rates in the world. The Thula Baba Box is inspired by this trend and aims to promote infant health and wellbeing in South Africa.

== History ==
The Thula Baba Box project was initiated by Stellenbosch parents Ernst Hertzog and Frans De Villiers. They came up with the idea to develop a Maternity package, similar to the kit granted by the Finnish social security, and to introduce it into the newly proposed national health insurance system of South Africa by 2020.

== Package ==
The box contains baby products, information brochures on babies, baby clothes, washing items, basic medicine, toys, and other items.

The box further doubles up as a cot the newborn baby can sleep in. It is aimed at providing a safe sleeping environment for the baby. It has been shown that providing the infant with his/her own bed, instead of sleeping with the parent, helps reduce the risk of death due to suffocation or falling in between the mattress and the headboard.

== African relevance ==
Many African women and their newborns do not have access to health care during the early postnatal period, putting them at an increased risk of illness and death. Each year, 310,000 fewer newborns would die in Africa and many maternal deaths could be preventable if coverage of postnatal care reached 90 percent of women and babies. With the Thula Baba Box adapted to the South African context it can serve as solid basis for other African nations to re-invent their own versions.

== South African health targets ==
South African health targets for 2014 include:

- Reducing child mortalities to less than 20 deaths per 1,000 live births
- To decrease the maternal mortality ratio (MMR) to 100 or less per 100 000 live births

The Thula Baba Box has the potential to aid the Health Care system achieving these targets in the future.

== Baby Boxes in popular culture ==
In 2015, the Duke and Duchess of Cambridge, William and Kate, were given a Baby Box by the Finnish government in celebration of the birth of their second born child, Baby Charlotte.

== Future ==
A study into the potential social benefits of rolling out the Thula Baba Box is currently underway in the Western Cape, South Africa. The study, which is funded by the private sector and taken on board by the Department of Economics at the University of Stellenbosch, aims to assess the effects on maternal and infant health. The study focuses on mainly the lower-income families of the Western Cape. Detailed design work are expected to proceed once study work has been concluded. It is expected that the Thula Baba Box will be introduced to new mothers at state funded clinics and hospitals in the Western Cape within the next three to five years.
