= Thyle =

Member of Scandinavian or Anglo-Saxon royal court

Unferth.

A thyle (OE þyle, ON þulr) was a member of the court associated with Scandinavian and Anglo-Saxon royalty and chieftains in the Early Middle Ages, whose precise role is uncertain but probably had to do with the preservation of knowledge of the past and the judging of present statements against it.

Most literary references are found in Icelandic and Old English literature like the Hávamál, where the term Fimbulþulr, "the great thyle", presumably refers to Odin himself, and Beowulf. In Gautreks saga, Starkad is referred to as a þulr after he sacrifices a king. The word also appears on the runic inscription of the Snoldelev Stone. Frederiksberg's original name was Tulehøj ("Thyle Hill").

The Old English term is glossed as Latin histrio "orator" and curra "jester"; þylcræft means "elocution". Zoëga's Concise Dictionary of Old Icelandic defines þulr as "wise-man, sage," cognate to Old Norse þula (verb) "to speak" and þula (noun) "list in poetic form". The Rundata project translates þulr as "reciter". From this it appears that the office of thyle was connected to the keeping and reproducing of orally transmitted lore like the Rígsþula, "Lay of Rígr".

Unferð holds the role of thyle in the poem Beowulf; it has been suggested that he was also the scop who is mentioned reciting poetry at the feast. It might be seen as a legitimate function of a guardian of the knowledge of the past to challenge boasts, judging them against the heroic past. This may have played a role in preserving the luck of the group. Alternatively the thyle's role, including Unferth's, has also been envisaged as part of the comitatus (war-band), channeling rage into concerted action.

Some modern scholars view the role of the thyle as being usurped by monks after Christianization, and being reduced to the modern caricature of the jester (hence the Latin gloss of curra).

== See also ==
- Skald
- Symbel
- Thula
