= Tasmantrix thula =

Scientific classification
- Domain: Eukaryota
- Kingdom: Animalia
- Phylum: Arthropoda
- Class: Insecta
- Order: Lepidoptera
- Family: Micropterigidae
- Genus: Tasmantrix
- Species: T. thula

Binomial name
- Tasmantrix thula Gibbs, 2010

Species of moth

Tasmantrix thula is a moth of the family Micropterigidae. It is known from eastern Australia, where it is known from northern Queensland, from Devils Thumb and Mossman Gorge in the north to Mission Beach and from Herberton State Forest to Mission beach.

The forewing length is 3.2 mm for males and 3.8 mm for females.
