= Brachylomia discolor =

Scientific classification
- Domain: Eukaryota
- Kingdom: Animalia
- Phylum: Arthropoda
- Class: Insecta
- Order: Lepidoptera
- Superfamily: Noctuoidea
- Family: Noctuidae
- Genus: Brachylomia
- Species: B. discolor

Binomial name
- Brachylomia discolor Smith, 1904

Synonyms
- Cleoceris discolor; Lomilysis discolor

Species of moth

Brachylomia discolor is a moth of the family Noctuidae first described by Smith in 1904. It is found in the western United States from southern Idaho and southern Wyoming southward through Utah and Nevada to southern California and New Mexico.
