= Thula (poetic genre) =

Ancient Germanic poetic genre

The thula (/ˈθuːlə/; pl. thulas, from Old Norse: þula pl. þulur: (verb) "to speak", (noun) "list in poetic form") is an ancient poetic genre in the Germanic literatures. Thulas are metrical name-lists or lists of poetic synonyms compiled, mainly, for oral recitation. The main function of thulas is thought to be mnemonic. The Old Norse term was first applied to an English poem, the Old English "Widsith", by Andreas Heusler and Wilhelm Ranisch in 1903. Thulas occur as parts of longer poems, too; Old Norse examples are found in various passages of the poetic and the prose Edda (esp. Skáldskaparmál with the Nafnaþulur, Grímnismál, Alvíssmál), the Rígsþula as well as in the Völuspá. Thulas can be considered as sources of once canonic knowledge, rooted in prehistoric beliefs and rituals. They generally preserve mythological and cosmogonical knowledge, often proper names and toponyms, but also the names of semi-legendary or historical persons. Their language is usually highly formalized, and they make extensive use of mnemonic devices such as alliteration. For a number of archaic words and formulas, some thulas are the only available source. The term and the genre may go back to the function of the Thyle (Old Norse: þulr), who held the function of an orator and was responsible for the cultus.

== Examples ==
The different versions of the Anglo-Saxon Chronicle start off with the names of the English rulers back to Woden in metrical form:

Cymric [wæs] Cerdicing, Cerdic Elesing, Elesa Esling, Esla Gewising, Gewis Wiging, Wig Freawining, Freawine Friðugaring, Friðugar Bronding, Brond Bædæging, Bældæg Wodening

The longest Old English thulas, though, are part of the poem "Widsith", listing, in the first thula, 30 kings, 54 tribes in the second, and 28 men in the third and last thula.

== Outside early medieval literature ==
Lists of names and objects abound in texts other than early Germanic ones, too. In classic Greek and Latin poetry, lists, or catalogues, function as forms of amplificatio (see amplification) and enumeratio. Ovid includes a catalogue of trees in his Metamorphoses (10.90-108). Lists in works by later medieval authors follow the classic models rather than the thulas, even though the poetic effect may be similar. A good example is found in Chaucer's Parlement of Foules, which, among other things, features a list of trees:

The bilder ook, and eek the hardy asshe;
The piler elm, the cofre unto careyne;
The boxtree piper; holm to whippes lasshe;
The sayling firr; the cipres, deth to pleyne;
The sheter ew, the asp for shaftes pleyne;
The olyve of pees, and eek the drunken vyne,
The victor palm, the laurer to devyne.

The "Wood of Error" in Edmund Spenser's The Faerie Queene (I.i.8-9), is a similar catalogue of trees, based on that of Ovid. Among modern authors, James Joyce, for instance, includes numerous lists in his Ulysses and Finnegans Wake, e.g., a list of the books in Leopold Bloom's library. (Ulysses 17.1357ff.)
