= Atom Poets =

The Atom Poets (Icelandic: Atómskáld) were a group of Icelandic modernist poets working in the wake of modernist poets like Steinn Steinarr and Jón úr Vör, the most prominent of whom were Einar Bragi, Hannes Sigfússon, Jón Óskar, Sigfús Daðason, Dagur Sigurðarson and Stefán Hörður Grímsson, who all began their careers in the 1940s and 1950s.

The term was coined by Icelandic's Nobel Prize-winning novelist Halldór Laxness in his 1948 novel The Atom Station: in Daisy Nejmann's summary, "the atom poet in the novel is a bad poet and a less than sympathetic character." The name, at first used pejoratively, stuck, and came to mean all poetry written in a non-traditional manner. In contrast, the atom poets' work is more complex and introspective, requiring more effort from the reader. Influenced by French surrealism (Einar Bragi had translated some of their texts into Icelandic), these poets revolutionized Icelandic poetry, replacing the "old poetic traditions of meter, alliteration, and stylized 'poetic' diction" with "free verse and other features of the 'international' style."

The Atom Poets did not have a manifesto and were never an organized movement, though some of them collaborated on the editorial board of the "main forum for Icelandic modernists," Birtingur, founded in 1953 by Einar Bragi.
