= List of Iceland national football team managers =

== Linear record ==
As of 30 September 2026

Note: this list includes international friendlies.

Manager	Year(s)	Games	Win	Draw	Loss	Goals for	Goals against	Goal diff	Win %	Unbeaten %
(England) Freddie Steele (Scotland) Murdo McDougall	1946	1	0	0	1	0	3	−3	0%	0%
(Sweden) Roland Bergström	1947	1	0	0	1	2	4	−2	0%	0%
(Scotland) Joe Devine	1948	1	1	0	0	2	0	+2	100%	100%
(West Germany) Fritz Buchloh	1949	1	0	0	1	1	5	−4	0%	0%
(Iceland) Óli B. Jónsson	1951	2	1	0	1	5	6	−1	50%	50%
(Austria) Franz Köhler	1953	3	0	0	3	4	11	−7	0%	0%
(Iceland) Karl Guðmundsson	1954–1956	6	2	0	4	9	14	−5	33.3%	33.3%
(Scotland) Alex Weir	1957	6	0	0	6	8	35	−27	0%	0%
(Iceland) Óli B. Jónsson	1958	1	0	0	1	2	3	−1	0%	0%
(Iceland) Karl Guðmundsson	1959	4	1	1	2	5	7	−2	25%	50%
(Iceland) Óli B. Jónsson	1960	3	0	0	3	1	11	−10	0%	0%
(Iceland) Karl Guðmundsson	1961	2	1	0	1	4	4	0	50%	50%
(Iceland) Ríkharður Jónsson	1962	3	0	1	2	4	8	−4	0%	33.3%
(Iceland) Karl Guðmundsson	1963–1965	6	1	0	5	5	19	−14	16.7%	16.7%
(Iceland) Ríkharður Jónsson	1965	1	0	1	0	0	0	0	0%	100%
(Iceland) Karl Guðmundsson	1966	2	0	1	1	3	5	−2	0%	50%
(Iceland) Reynir Karlsson	1967	4	0	1	3	6	23	−17	0%	25%
(Austria) Walter Pfeiffer	1968	2	0	0	2	1	7	−6	0%	0%
(Iceland) Ríkharður Jónsson	1969–1971	15	2	3	10	13	24	−11	13.3%	33.3%
(Scotland) Duncan McDowell	1972	4	1	0	3	5	13	−8	25%	25%
(Iceland) Eggert Jóhannesson	1972	1	0	0	1	1	4	−3	0%	0%
(Iceland) Örn Steinsen	1973	1	1	0	0	4	0	+4	100%	100%
(Denmark) Henning Enoksen	1973	6	0	0	6	2	22	−20	0%	0%
(England) Tony Knapp	1974–1977	26	8	3	15	32	38	−6	30.8%	42.3%
(Soviet Union) Jurí Ilitchev	1978–1979	11	0	2	9	3	24	−21	0%	18.2%
(Iceland) Guðni Kjartansson	1980–1981	15	5	4	6	22	31	−9	33.3%	60%
(Iceland) Jóhannes Atlason	1982–1983	16	4	3	9	20	23	−3	25%	43.8%
(England) Tony Knapp	1984–1985	14	5	3	6	18	13	+5	35.7%	57.1%
(West Germany) Sigfried Held	1986–1989	37	6	8	23	23	59	−36	16.2%	37.8%
(Iceland) Guðni Kjartansson	1989	1	1	0	0	2	1	+1	100%	100%
(Sweden) Bo Johansson	1990–1991	15	6	1	8	23	18	+5	40%	46.6%
(Iceland) Ásgeir Elíasson	1991–1995	35	12	8	15	31	39	−8	34.3%	57.1%
(Iceland) Logi Ólafsson	1996–1997	14	4	3	7	15	26	−11	28.6%	50%
(Iceland) Guðjón Þórðarson	1997–1999	25	11	6	8	37	26	+11	44%	68%
(Iceland) Atli Eðvaldsson	2000–2003	30	11	5	14	38	44	−6	36.7%	51.6%
(Iceland) Ásgeir Sigurvinsson (Iceland) Logi Ólafsson	2003–2005	24	6	5	13	31	47	−16	25%	45.8%
(Iceland) Eyjólfur Sverrisson	2006–2007	14	2	4	8	12	27	−15	14.3%	42.9%
(Iceland) Ólafur Jóhannesson	2007–2011	39	11	9	19	40	50	−10	28.2%	51.3%
(Sweden) Lars Lagerbäck	2011–2013	20	8	3	9	28	30	−2	40%	55%
(Sweden) Lars Lagerbäck (Iceland) Heimir Hallgrímsson	2013–2016	32	13	7	12	50	46	+4	40.6%	63%
(Iceland) Heimir Hallgrímsson	2016–2018	25	12	4	9	40	27	+13	48%	64%
(Sweden) Erik Hamrén	2018–2020	28	9	5	14	29	50	−21	32.14%	50%
(Iceland) Arnar Viðarsson	2020–2023	31	6	13	12	37	49	−12	19.35%	61.29%
(Norway) Åge Hareide	2023–2024	20	8	2	10	29	33	−4	40%	50%
(Iceland) Arnar Gunnlaugsson	2025–	21	7	5	9	36	30	+6	33.33%	57.1%

== Individual records ==
As of 16 November 2026

Note: this list includes international friendlies.

Manager	Year(s)	Games	Win	Draw	Loss	Goals for	Goals against	Goal diff	Win %	Unbeaten %
(Iceland) Heimir Hallgrímsson	2013–2018	57	25	11	21	90	73	+17	43.9%	63.2%
(Sweden) Lars Lagerbäck	2011–2016	52	21	10	21	78	76	+2	40.4%	59.6%
(England) Tony Knapp	1974–1977, 1984–1985	40	13	6	21	50	51	−1	32.5%	47.5%
(Iceland) Ólafur Jóhannesson	2007–2011	39	11	9	19	40	50	−10	28.2%	51.3%
(Iceland) Logi Ólafsson	1996–1997, 2003–2005	38	10	8	20	46	73	−27	26.3%	47.4%
(West Germany) Sigfried Held	1986–1989	37	6	8	23	23	59	−36	16.2%	37.8%
(Iceland) Ásgeir Elíasson	1991–1995	35	12	8	15	31	39	−8	34.3%	57.1%
(Iceland) Arnar Viðarsson	2020–2023	31	6	13	12	37	49	−12	19,35%	61,29%
(Iceland) Atli Eðvaldsson	2000–2003	30	11	5	14	38	44	−6	36.7%	51.6%
(Sweden) Erik Hamrén	2018–2020	28	9	5	14	29	50	−21	32.14%	50%
(Iceland) Guðjón Þórðarson	1997–1999	25	11	6	8	37	26	+11	44%	68%
(Iceland) Ásgeir Sigurvinsson	2003–2005	24	6	5	13	31	47	−16	25%	45.8%
(Iceland) Arnar Gunnlaugsson	2025–	21	7	5	9	36	30	+6	33.33%	57.1%
(Norway) Åge Hareide	2023–2024	20	8	2	10	29	33	−4	40%	50%
(Iceland) Karl Guðmundsson	1954–1956, 1959, 1961, 1963–1965, 1966	20	5	2	13	26	49	−23	25%	35%
(Iceland) Ríkharður Jónsson	1962, 1965, 1969–1971	19	2	5	12	17	32	−15	10.5%	36.8%
(Iceland) Guðni Kjartansson	1980–1981, 1989	16	6	4	6	24	32	−8	37.5%	62.5%
(Iceland) Jóhannes Atlason	1982–1983	16	4	3	9	20	23	−3	25%	43.8%
(Sweden) Bo Johansson	1990–1991	15	6	1	8	23	18	+5	40%	46.6%
(Iceland) Eyjólfur Sverrisson	2006–2007	14	2	4	8	12	27	−15	14.3%	42.9%
(Soviet Union) Jurí Ilitchev	1978–1979	11	0	2	9	3	24	−21	0%	18.2%
(Iceland) Óli B. Jónsson	1951, 1958, 1960	6	1	0	5	8	20	−12	16.7%	16.7%
(Denmark) Henning Enoksen	1973	6	0	0	6	2	22	−20	0%	0%
(Scotland) Alex Weir	1957	6	0	0	6	8	35	−27	0%	0%
(Scotland) Duncan McDowell	1972	4	1	0	3	5	13	−8	25%	25%
(Iceland) Reynir Karlsson	1967	4	0	1	3	6	23	−17	0%	25%
(Austria) Franz Köhler	1953	3	0	0	3	4	11	−7	0%	0%
(Austria) Walter Pfeiffer	1968	2	0	0	2	1	7	−6	0%	0%
(Iceland) Örn Steinsen	1973	1	1	0	0	4	0	+4	100%	100%
(Scotland) Joe Devine	1948	1	1	0	0	2	0	+2	100%	100%
(Sweden) Roland Bergström	1947	1	0	0	1	2	4	−2	0%	0%
(Iceland) Eggert Jóhannesson	1972	1	0	0	1	1	4	−3	0%	0%
(England) Freddie Steele	1946	1	0	0	1	0	3	−3	0%	0%
(Scotland) Murdo McDougall	1946	1	0	0	1	0	3	−3	0%	0%
(West Germany) Fritz Buchloh	1949	1	0	0	1	1	5	−4	0%	0%
