= 2026–27 Győri ETO FC season =

ETO Győr
2026–27 season
- Owner: Oszkár Világi
- Manager: Efraín Juárez (From 19 June 2026)
- Stadium: ETO Park
- Nemzeti Bajnokság I: 1st
- Magyar Kupa: Round of 32
- UEFA Champions League: First qualifying round
- UEFA Conference League: Third qualifying round
- Top goalscorer: League: Đukanović and Kulenović (5 each); All: Đukanović (7)
- Highest home attendance: 8,703; 0–3 v Ferencváros, (3 September 2026, Nemzeti Bajnokság I, Round 3)
- Lowest home attendance: 4,235; 1–1 v Atert Bissen, (30 July 2026, Conf. League Qual., 2nd round)
- Average home league attendance: 5,489
- Biggest win: 4 goals 6–2 v Atert Bissen (A), (Stade de Luxembourg, 21 July 2026, Conf. League Qual., 2nd round); 4–0 v Nyíregyháza (H), (Home, 2 August 2026, Nemzeti Bajnokság I, Round 2)
- Biggest defeat: 3 goals 0–3 v Ferencváros (H), (3 September 2026, Nemzeti Bajnokság I, Round 3)
- All statistics correct as of 21 November 2026.

The 2026–27 season is the 75th season in the history of ETO Győr, and the club's second consecutive season in the Nemzeti Bajnokság I. In addition to the domestic league, the team participates in the Magyar Kupa and the UEFA Champions League after winning the previous Nemzeti Bajnokság I (domestic league) season.

UEFA Champions League

After being eliminated in the first round by Icelandic team Víkingur Reykjavík 3–2 on aggregate, they continued in the second qualifying round of the UEFA Conference League.

UEFA Conference League

In the second qualifying round they faced Luxembourg side Atert Bissen and ETO Győr won 7–3 on aggregate. In the third qualifying round they faced Latvian Higher League champions Riga and Riga won 2–1 on aggregate, therefore ETO Győr's European Cup season ended this season.

== Kits ==
Supplier: Macron • Sponsor: Tippmix

Home	Home alt.	Away	Away alt.	Third

Goalkeeper^{1}	Goalkeeper^{2}

== First team squad ==
As of 14 September 2026
Injured player

Note: Flags indicate national team as defined under FIFA eligibility rules; some limited exceptions apply. Players may hold more than one non-FIFA nationality.

No.	Pos.	Nation	Player
2	DF	ROU	Ștefan Vlădoiu
5	MF	ROU	Paul Anton
7	MF	NGR	Peter Agba (on loan from (Israel) Maccabi Haifa)
9	FW	BIH	Luka Kulenović (on loan from (Netherlands) Heracles)
10	MF	ROU	Claudiu Bumba
11	FW	GAM	Nfansu Njie
14	FW	HUN	Márton Szép
16	GK	HUN	Balázs Megyeri
17	FW	HUN	Szabolcs Schön
19	MF	CRC	Jewison Bennette (on loan from (Ukraine) Cherkasy)
20	DF	HUN	Barnabás Bíró
21	MF	ROU	Efraim Bödő
23	DF	CRO	Daniel Štefulj
24	DF	SRB	Miljan Krpić (captain)
26	DF	HUN	Ádám Umathum
27	DF	NGR	Leon Balogun

No.	Pos.	Nation	Player
29	FW	MDA	Nicolae Rotaru
31	FW	GAM	Modou Lamin Marong
34	FW	MNE	Viktor Đukanović (on loan from (Sweden) Hammarby)
37	DF	SVK	Norbert Urblík
47	MF	HUN	Ádám Décsy
53	DF	HUN	Bálint Selyem
64	GK	HUN	Dániel Brecska
75	DF	HUN	Noel Csorba
76	FW	AUT	Jovan Živković
77	MF	COL	Élan Ricardo (on loan from (Turkey) Beşiktaş)
80	FW	SRB	Željko Gavrić (vice-captain)
88	FW	SUI	Marc Giger (on loan from (Belgium) Union Saint-Gilloise)
90	MF	HUN	Kevin Bánáti
96	FW	HUN	Marcell Huszár
99	GK	SVK	Samuel Petráš

== Board of directors ==
As of 1 July 2026

Position	Name
President	(Slovakia) (Hungary) Bálint Világi
Sporting director	(Belgium) Steven Vanharen
Team manager	(Hungary) Ádám Nagy
PR coordinator	(Hungary) Bence Sallai

=== Management ===
As of 7 July 2026

Position	Name
Head coach	(Mexico) Efraín Juárez
Assistant coach	(Spain) Alex Larrea
Assistant coach	(Mexico) Luis Perez
Assistant coach	(Hungary) Zoltán Lipták
Performance manager	(Italy) Luca Guerra
Sport scientist	(Spain) (Mexico) Guillermo Zaragoza
Player development manager	(Hungary) Szabolcs Csordás

== Transfers ==
=== Summer ===
In
Date	No.	Pos.	Nat.	Player	Moving from	Division	Ref.
6 June 2026	26	DF	Hungary	Ádám Umathum	Csákvár	Nemzeti Bajnokság II	
13 July 2026	18	MF	The Gambia	Modou Lamin Mass	Almasi Football Academy	N/A	
6 August 2026	27	DF	Nigeria	Leon Balogun	Aris Limassol	Cyprus I	
26 August 2026	21	MF	Romania	Efraim Bödő	Csíkszereda	Liga I (Romania I)	
27 August 2026	29	FW	Moldova	Nicolae Rotaru	Petrocub Hîncești	Liga I (Moldova I)	
4 September 2026	TBD	FW	The Gambia	Modou Lamin Marong	Šamorín	2. Liga (Slovakia II)	

On loan
Date	No.	Pos.	Nat.	Player	Loaned from	Division	Until	Ref.
17 July 2026	34	FW	Montenegro	Viktor Đukanović	Hammarby	Sweden I	30 June 2027	
19 August 2026	7	MF	Nigeria	Peter Agba	Maccabi Haifa	Israeli Premier League (Israel I)	30 June 2027	
19 August 2026	19	MF	Costa Rica	Jewison Bennette	Cherkasy	Ukrainian Premier League (Ukraine I)	30 June 2027	
3 September 2026	9	FW	Bosnia and Herzegovina	Luka Kulenović	Heracles Almelo	Eerste Divisie (Netherlands II)	30 June 2027	
4 September 2026	TBD	MF	Colombia	Élan Ricardo	Beşiktaş	Süper Lig (Turkey I)	30 June 2027	
4 September 2026	TBD	FW	Switzerland	Marc Giger	Union Saint-Gilloise	Belgian Pro League	30 June 2027	

Permanently joins from loan
Date	No.	Pos.	Nat.	Player	Returned from	Division	Ref.
6 June 2026	17	MF	Hungary	Szabolcs Schön	Bolton Wanderers	England III	
2 July 2026	21	DF	Hungary	Márk Csinger	DAC 1904	Slovakia I	

Out
Date	No.	Pos.	Nat.	Player	Moving to	Division	Ref.
5 June 2026	25	DF	Romania	Deian Boldor	Kispest-Honvéd	Nemzeti Bajnokság I	
6 June 2026	18	DF	Belgium	Senna Miangué	Aktobe	Kazakhstan Premier League (Kazakhstan I)	
12 June 2026	19	FW	Ukraine	Oleksandr Pyshchur	Girona	La Liga (Spain I)	
6 August 2026	27	FW	Hungary	Milán Vitális (captain)	AEK	Super League (Greece I)	
14 August 2026	21	DF	Hungary	Márk Csinger	Groningen	Netherlands I	
17 August 2026	7	FW	Algeria	Nadhir Benbouali	Pyramids	Egyptian Premier League (Egypt I)	
18 August 2026	6	FW	Hungary	Rajmund Tóth	Konyaspor	Süper Lig (Turkey I)	

Out on loan
Date	No.	Pos.	Nat.	Player	Loaned to	Division	Until	Ref.
28 July 2026	76	FW	Serbia	Jovan Živković	Radnički	Serbian SuperLiga	30 June 2027	
28 August 2026	70	MF	Hungary	Imre Tollár	Gyirmót	Nemzeti Bajnokság II	30 June 2027	
14 September 2026	18	MF	The Gambia	Modou Lamin Mass	Šamorín	2. Liga (Slovakia II)	30 June 2027	

Players participating in a cooperation agreement to loan
Date	No.	Pos.	Nat.	Player	Loaned to	Division	Until	Ref.
1 July 2026	70	MF	Hungary	Imre Tollár	Ajka	Nemzeti Bajnokság II	30 June 2027	
1 July 2026	22	MF	Hungary	Bulcsú Szarka	Ajka	Nemzeti Bajnokság II	30 June 2027	
1 July 2026	75	DF	Hungary	Noel Csorba	Ajka	Nemzeti Bajnokság II	30 June 2027	
1 July 2026	11	FW	Hungary	Ármin Garamszegi-Géczy	Ajka	Nemzeti Bajnokság II	30 June 2027	
1 July 2026	2	DF	Hungary	Bálint Selyem	Ajka	Nemzeti Bajnokság II	30 June 2027	

Note: The cooperation opportunity allows the following players to participate in the ETO FC first division, FC Ajka second division and ETO Academy third division competitions.

=== Contract renewals ===
Date	No.	Pos.	Nat.	Player	Extension to	Ref.
23 June 2026	16	GK	Hungary	Balázs Megyeri	30 June 2027	
23 June 2026	99	GK	Slovakia	Samuel Petráš	30 June 2027	
9 October 2026	24	DF	Serbia	Miljan Krpić	30 June 2029	
5 November 2026	53	DF	Hungary	Bálint Selyem	30 June 2030	
13 November 2026	37	DF	Slovakia	Norbert Urblík	30 June 2029	
15 November 2026	75	DF	Hungary	Noel Csorba	30 June 2029	

=== New contract ===
Date	No.	Pos.	Nat.	Player	Moved from	Ref.
14 August 2026	TBD	GK	Hungary	Botond Hajczinger	ETO Academy	
14 August 2026	TBD	GK	Hungary	Milos Pleszkáts	ETO Academy	
14 August 2026	TBD	GK	Hungary	Huba Lengyel	ETO Academy	
2 September 2026	TBD	MF	Hungary	Valentin Horváth	ETO Academy	
2 September 2026	TBD	FW	Hungary	Csongor Élő	ETO Academy	

=== Managerial changes ===
Outgoing manager	Manner of departure	Date of vacancy	Position in table	Incoming manager	Date of appointment	Ref.
Balázs Borbély	Mutual agreement	23 May 2026	Pre-season	(Mexico) Efraín Juárez	19 June 2026	

== Friendlies ==
Win Draw Loss Fixtures

=== Pre-season ===
Summer training camp in Bad Radkersburg, Austria, from 19 June 2026.

19 June 2026 Friendly	Graz (Austrian I) (Austria)	2–2	ETO Győr	Bad Radkersburg, Austria
17:30 CEST (UTC+02:00)	Michorl 17'; Grosse 71' (pen.)	Report	Umathum 45+1'; Mass 63'	Attendance: 1,100
Note: • ETO Győr 1st half: Petráš — Vlădoiu, Umathum, N. Urblík, Štefulj — Décsy, Bumba, Gavrić — Bánáti, Garamszegi-Géczy, Huszár • ETO Győr 2nd half: Megyeri — Ba. Bíró, Krpić, Szarka, Csorba — Mass, Szép, Tollár — Živković, Njie, Schön (Selyem (substituted on) 75') • Manager: Juárez

24 June 2026 Friendly	Vojvodina (Serbian I) (Serbia)	1–2	ETO Győr	Söchau, Austria
14:00 CEST (UTC+02:00)	Tanjga 14'	Report	Gavrić 5', 54'	Attendance: 100
Note: • ETO Győr until 55th minutes: Petráš — Vlădoiu, Csinger, Krpić, Štefulj — Vitális, R. Tóth, Gavrić — Bumba, Njie, Bánáti • ETO Győr from 55th minutes: Megyeri — Ba. Bíró, Umathum, N. Urblík, Szarka (Selyem (substituted on) 77') — Mass (Tollár (substituted on) 70'), Décsy (Garamszegi-Géczy (substituted on) 77'), Szép — Schön, Huszár, Živković • Manager: Juárez

27 June 2026 Friendly	Csíkszereda (Romanian I) (Romania)	3–1	ETO Győr	Dunajská Streda, Slovakia
	Tajti 30'; Pászka 36'; A. Szabó 43'	Report	Vitális 58' (pen.)	Stadium: [MOL Aréna; Attendance: 250; Referee: Malárik; Assistant referees: Štofík, Pozor
Note: Duna Cup, Semi-final, 2×30 minutes playing time • ETO Győr: Megyeri — Vlădoiu (Štefulj (substituted on) 31'), N. Urblík, Umathum, Ba. Bíró (Živković (substituted on) 41') — R. Tóth (Vitális (substituted on) 31'), Szép (Selyem (substituted on) 41') — Gavrić (Schön (substituted on) 31'), Bumba (Décsy (substituted on) 31'), Bánáti (Garamszegi-Géczy (substituted on) 41') — Huszár (Njie (substituted on) 31') • Manager: Juárez

28 June 2026 Friendly	TSC Topola (Serbian II) (Serbia)	2–3	ETO Győr	Dunajská Streda, Slovakia
	Bosić 14'; Milosavić 53'	Report	Bumba 4'; Njie 30+1'; Gavrić 40'	Stadium: [MOL Aréna; Attendance: 250; Referee: Ruc; Assistant referees: D. Štofík, J. Štofik
Note: Duna Cup, Bronze match, 2×30 minutes playing time • ETO Győr: Megyeri — Vlădoiu (Ba. Bíró (substituted on) 31'), Krpić, Csinger, Štefulj (Csorba (substituted on) 55') — Décsy (Mass (substituted on) 40'), Vitális, Gavrić (Szép (substituted on) 55') — Bumba (Tollár (substituted on) 40'), Njie (Bánáti (substituted on) 45'), Schön (Huszár (substituted on) 60') • Manager: Juárez

Source of fixtures: Soccerway.

=== Mid-season ===
3 October 2026 Friendly	Podbrezová (Slovak I) (Slovakia)	1–1	ETO Győr	Šamorín, Slovakia
	Miljanić 21'	Report	Szép 44'	Attendance: 100
Note: • ETO Győr 1st half: Petráš — Bennette, R. Umathum, Balogun, Krpić, Štefulj — Agba, Ricardo, Szép — Huszár, Kulenović • ETO Győr 2nd half: Petráš (Hajczinger (substituted on) 60') — Ba. Bíró, R. Umathum (Bödő (substituted on) 60'), Krpić (Nagy (substituted on) 75'), Csorba, Méhes — Bánáti, Huszár (Giger (substituted on) 60'), Bumba — Gavrić, Marong • Manager: Juárez

== Competitions ==
=== Overall record ===
In italics, we indicate the Last match and the Final position achieved in competition(s) that have not yet been completed.

Competition	First match	Last match	Starting round	Final position	Record							
Competition	First match	Last match	Starting round	Final position	Pld	W	D	L	GF	GA	GD	Win %
Nemzeti Bajnokság I	26 July 2026	21 November 2026	Matchday 1	1st	14	7	5	2	25	16	+9	50.00
Magyar Kupa	13 September 2026	28 October 2026	Round of 64	Round of 32	2	1	0	1	6	4	+2	50.00
UEFA Champions League	7 July 2026	14 July 2026	First qualifying round	First qualifying round	2	0	1	1	2	3	−1	0.00
UEFA Conference League	21 July 2026	13 August 2026	Third qualifying round	Third qualifying round	4	1	2	1	8	5	+3	25.00
Total					22	9	8	5	41	28	+13	40.91

Last updated: 21 November 2026
Source: Soccerway

=== Nemzeti Bajnokság I ===
==== League table ====
Pos	Team	Pld	W	D	L	GF	GA	GD	Pts	Qualification or relegation
1	ETO Győr	14	7	5	2	25	16	+9	26	Qualification for the Champions League second qualifying round
2	Puskás Akadémia	14	8	0	6	19	17	+2	24	Qualification for the Conference League second qualifying round
3	Ferencváros	13	6	5	2	23	13	+10	23	Qualification for the Conference League second qualifying round
4	Debrecen	13	6	4	3	24	18	+6	22	
5	Paks	13	6	2	5	24	22	+2	20	

Updated to match(es) played on 21 November 2026, Round 14 (3 and 6 matches). Source: Hungarian Football Federation (in Hungarian)
Rules for classification: 1) Points; 2) Matches won; 3) Goal difference; 4) Goals scored (GF); 5) Head-to-head points; 6) Head-to-head goal difference; 7) Fair play ranking; 8) Drawing of lots.

==== Results summary ====
Overall								Home						Away					
Pld	W	D	L	GF	GA	GD	Pts	W	D	L	GF	GA	GD	W	D	L	GF	GA	GD
14	7	5	2	25	16	+9	26	4	1	2	13	8	+5	3	4	0	12	8	+4

Last updated: 21 November 2026.
Source: Soccerway

==== Results by round ====
A = Away; H = Home; W = Win; D = Draw; L = Loss; P = Postponed

Round	1	2	4	5	6	3^{1}	7	8	9	10	11	12	13	14	15	16	17	18	19	20	21	22	23	24	25	26	27	28	29	30	31	32	33
Ground	A	H	A	H	A	H	H	A	H	A	H	H	A	A	H	A	H	A	H	A	H	A	A	H	H	A	H	A	H	A	H	A	H
Result	D	W	D	W	D	L	W	W	L	W	W	D	D	W																			
Position	5	1	5	7	3	4	2	2	3	2	2	1	3	1																			
Points	1	4	5	8	9	9	12	15	15	18	21	22	23	26																			
Manager	J	J	J	J	J	J	J	J	J	J	J	J	J	J																			

Updated to match(es) played on 21 November 2026. Source:
Notes:
Manager: • J Juárez

^{1} Round 3 match (ETO Győr–Ferencváros) has been postponed after Round 6, 3 September 2026.

==== Matches ====
Win Draw Loss Fixtures Postponed

The draw for the 2026/27 season was held on 22 June 2026.

26 July 2026 1	Vasas	2–2	ETO Győr	Budapest
15:45 CEST	Hey (red card) 29'; J. Urblík 71'; Koszta (yellow card) 77'; Csóka 89'	Report	Vitális (yellow card) 30'; Gavrić (yellow card) 55' (goal) 57' (pen.); Schön (yellow card) 62'; Szép (yellow card) 73'; Huszár 80'	Stadium: Illovszky Rudolf Stadion; Attendance: 3,649; Referee: Bence Csonka dr. Assistant referees: Vencel Tóth II, Norbert Bornemissza
Note: • ETO Győr: Petráš — Vlădoiu (Ba. Bíró (substituted on) 84'), Umathum, Krpić, Štefulj — Vitális (c) — Bumba (Décsy (substituted on) 84'), Gavrić — Njie (Szép (substituted on) 64'), Đukanović, Schön (Huszár (substituted on) 71') • Manager: Juárez • Player of the match: Jozef Urblík, Vasas 8.9 • Best player of ETO Győr: Marcell Huszár 7.9

2 August 2026 2	ETO Győr	4–0	Nyíregyháza	Győr
18:00 CEST	N. Urblík 23'; Njie 48'; Umathum (yellow card) 81'; Đukanović 82'; Bánáti 86'	Report	Benczenleitner (yellow card) 21'; L. Katona (yellow card) 66'; Hős (yellow card) 67'; Kvasina (yellow card) 75'; M. Katona (yellow card) 90+1'	Stadium: ETO Park; Attendance: 4,815; Referee: Balázs Berke; Assistant referees: Dániel Szalai, Péter Ország
Note: • ETO Győr: Petráš — Umathum, N. Urblík, Krpić (c) — Selyem, Décsy, Szép, Štefulj (Csorba (substituted on) 56') — Njie (Huszár (substituted on) 64'), Bumba (Schön (substituted on) 64') — Đukanović (Bánáti (substituted on) 83') • Manager: Juárez • Player of the match: Samuel Petráš, ETO Győr 8.7 • Best player of Nyíregyháza: Yuriy Toma 7.1

16 August 2026 4	Debrecen	1–1	ETO Győr	Debrecen
16:30 CEST	Guerrero 50'; Bošković (yellow card) 54'; Dzsudzsák (yellow card) 54'; Mejías (yellow card) 83'	Report	Gavrić 41'; Krpić (yellow card) 62'; Ba. Bíró (yellow card) 90+3'	Stadium: Nagyerdei Stadion; Attendance: 5,074; Referee: Balázs Berke; Assistant referees: Gergő Vígh-Tarsonyi, Bence Belicza
Note: • ETO Győr: Petráš — Umathum, N. Urblík, Krpić (c) — Ba. Bíró, Szép, Décsy (Njie (substituted on) 72'), Gavrić (L. Balogun (substituted on) 85'), Štefulj — Đukanović, Bumba (Huszár (substituted on) 85') • Manager: Juárez (yellow card) 64' • Player of the match: Željko Gavrić, ETO Győr 8.3 • Best player of Debrecen: Balázs Dzsudzsák 8.0

23 August 2026 5	ETO Győr	3–0	Zalaegerszeg	Győr
17:30 CEST	Đukanović (yellow card) 19' (goal) 82'; N. Urblík 25' (yellow card) 29'; Krpić (yellow card) 90'; Huszár 90+2'	Report	Tchicamboud (yellow card) 41'; Peraza (yellow card) 52'; Calderón (yellow card) 77'; Madaki (yellow card) 86'	Stadium: ETO Park; Attendance: 5,183; Referee: Ferenc Karakó; Assistant referees: Vencel Tóth II, Viktor Nagy
Note: • ETO Győr: Petráš — N. Urblík, Umathum, Krpić (c) — Ba. Bíró, Szép (Agba (substituted on) 72'), Gavrić, Bumba (Décsy (substituted on) 83'), Štefulj — Njie (Bennette (substituted on) 56'), Đukanović (Huszár (substituted on) 83') • Manager: Juárez • Player of the match: Daniel Štefulj, ETO Győr 8.5 • Best player of Zalaegerszeg: Joseth Peraza 7.0

30 August 2026 6	Kisvárda	1–1	ETO Győr	Kisvárda
16:30 CEST	Lippai 30'; Soltész (yellow card) 42'; Szőr (yellow card) 67'	Report	Njie 17'; Szép (yellow card) 40'; Agba (yellow card) 48'; N. Urblík (yellow card) 73'; Bennette (yellow card) 84'	Stadium: Várkerti Stadion; Attendance: 1,716; Referee: Bence Hanyecz; Assistant referees: Vencel Tóth II, Gergő Vígh-Tarsonyi
Note: • ETO Győr: Petráš — Selyem (Décsy (substituted on) 66'), L. Balogun, Krpić (c), Štefulj — N. Urblík — Agba (Bennette (substituted on) 66'), Gavrić (Huszár (substituted on) 82'), Bumba (Szép (substituted on) 28'), Đukanović — Njie • Manager: Juárez • Player of the match: Leon Balogun, ETO Győr 7.7 • Best player of Kisvárda: Dominik Soltész 7.0

3 September 2026 3	ETO Győr	0–3	Ferencváros	Győr
19:30 CEST	Szép (yellow card) 31'; Huszár (yellow card) 79'; Kulenović (penalty missed) 90+1'	Report	Bagi 27'; Corbu (yellow card) 49'; Gómez 70'; Lisztes 72'	Stadium: ETO Park; Attendance: 8,703; Referee: Bence Csonka dr. Assistant referees: Ákos Berényi, Dávid Rózsa
Note: • ETO Győr: Petráš — N. Urblík, L. Balogun, Krpić (c) — Ba. Bíró (Selyem (substituted on) 46'), Szép, Agba (Décsy (substituted on) 75'), Štefulj — Đukanović (Bennette (substituted on) 64'), Gavrić (Kulenović (substituted on) 75') — Njie (Huszár (substituted on) 75') • Manager: Juárez • Player of the match: Mariano Gómez, Ferencváros 7.9 • Best player of ETO Győr: Željko Gavrić 7.1

6 September 2026 7	ETO Győr	3–2	Kispest-Honvéd	Győr
20:00 CEST	Štefulj 69'; N. Urblík (yellow card) 63' (goal) 90+1'; Krpić 90+8' (pen.)	Report	Baki (yellow card) 2'; Eddarraj (yellow card) 72' (goal) 75'; Hangya (yellow card) 89'; Csontos (yellow card) 90+2'; Pekár 90+3' (yellow card) 90+5'; Hadžikić (yellow card) 90+6'	Stadium: ETO Park; Attendance: 5,456; Referee: Balázs Katona; Assistant referees: Norbert Bornemissza, Péter Ország
Note: • ETO Győr: Petráš — Umathum (Bánáti (substituted on) 86'), N. Urblík, Krpić (c), Štefulj — Szép (Bödő (substituted on) 86'), Agba, Đukanović (Rotaru (substituted on) 78') — Bennette (Selyem (substituted on) 78'), Kulenović, Njie (Huszár (substituted on) 60') • Manager: Juárez • Player of the match: Daniel Štefulj, ETO Győr 7.9 • Best player of Kispest-Honvéd: Reda Eddarraj 7.4

20 September 2026 8	MTK	1–2	ETO Győr	Budapest
14:45 CEST	Beriashvili (yellow card) 62'; I. Bognár 64'; Kata (yellow card) 80'; Radić (yellow card) 87'	Report	Bumba (yellow card) 19'; Szép 53' (yellow card) 90'; Agba 84'	Stadium: Hidegkuti Nándor Stadion; Attendance: 3,085; Referee: Péter Antal; Assistant referees: Gergely Becséri, József Aradi
Note: • ETO Győr: Petráš — N. Urblík (Selyem (substituted on) 70'), Umathum, Krpić (c) — Bennette, Szép, Agba, Štefulj — Đukanović (Gavrić (substituted on) 70'), Bumba (Ricardo (substituted on) 46') — Kulenović (Rotaru (substituted on) 76') • Manager: Juárez • Player of the match: Peter Agba, ETO Győr 8.1 • Best player of MTK: Mihály Kata 7.8

11 October 2026 9	ETO Győr	0–1	Puskás Akadémia	Győr
19:00 CEST	Krpić (yellow card) 29'	Report	Lukács 11'; Kern (yellow card) 29'; Arutyunyan (yellow card) 45'; Krupa (yellow card) 85'; Orján (yellow card) 89'	Stadium: ETO Park; Attendance: 4,745; Referee: Mihály Káprály; Assistant referees: Bence Belicza, Szabin Topálszki
Note: • ETO Győr: Petráš — L. Balogun, N. Urblík, Krpić (c) — Bennette (Đukanović (substituted on) 61'), Szép, Agba (Marong (substituted on) 75'), Štefulj — Ricardo (Gavrić (substituted on) 46'), Huszár (Selyem (substituted on) 61' (substituted off) 71' (Bumba (substituted on) 71')) — Kulenović • Manager: Juárez (yellow card) 23' • Player of the match: Laros Duarte, Puskás Akadémia 8.0 • Best player of ETO Győr: three players 7.4 each

17 October 2026 10	Paks	1–2	ETO Győr	Paks
17:00 CEST	Papp (yellow card) 8'; Győrfi (yellow card) 41'; Pető 48'; Wiesner (yellow card) 85'	Report	Ricardo (yellow card) 29'; Đukanović 39', 42'; Petráš (yellow card) 90+2'	Stadium: Fehérvári úti Stadion; Attendance: 3,023; Referee: Márton Rúsz; Assistant referees: Gergely Becséri, Levente Balla
Note: • ETO Győr: Petráš — Bennette (Bánáti (substituted on) 74'), N. Urblík, Krpić (c), Štefulj — Agba — Đukanović (Vlădoiu (substituted on) 84'), Szép, Ricardo (Gavrić (substituted on) 65'), Huszár (Umathum (substituted on) 65') — Kulenović (Marong (substituted on) 84') • Manager: Juárez • Player of the match: Viktor Đukanović, ETO Győr 9.9 • Best player of Paks: Márk Gyetván 7.6

24 October 2026 11	ETO Győr	1–0	Újpest	Győr
17:00 CEST	Kulenović 25'; Szép (yellow card) 51'; Krpić (yellow card) 90+1'	Report	Ljujić (yellow card) 24'; Ujváry (yellow card) 46'; N. Szendrei (yellow card) 54'; Mi. Mucsányi (yellow card) 90'	Stadium: ETO Park; Attendance: 6,556; Referee: Marcell Derdák; Assistant referees: Georgiou Theodoros, Ákos Berényi
Note: • ETO Győr: Petráš — Bennette (Vlădoiu (substituted on) 65'), N. Urblík, Krpić (c), Štefulj — Szép, Agba — Đukanović (Bánáti (substituted on) 65'), Ricardo (Gavrić (substituted on) 60'), Huszár (Umathum (substituted on) 75') — Kulenović (Marong (substituted on) 75') • Manager: Juárez • Player of the match: Samuel Petráš, ETO Győr 8.6 • Best player of Újpest: Heitor 8.2

31 October 2026 12	ETO Győr	2–2	Vasas	Győr
19:45 CET	N. Urblík (yellow card) 27'; Kulenović 60', 90'; Bennette (yellow card) 65'; Štefulj (yellow card) 79'; Krpić (yellow card) 86'		J. Urblík 4', 46'; Hey (yellow card) 48'; Molnár (yellow card) 51'; Hidi M (yellow card) 54'; Kovácsréti (yellow card) 79'	Stadium: ETO Park; Attendance: 4,776; Referee: Balázs Berke; Assistant referees: Norbert Bornemissza, Kevin Ring
Note: • ETO Győr: Petráš — Selyem (Huszár (substituted on) 57'), N. Urblík, Krpić (c), Štefulj (Giger (substituted on) 88') — Bánáti, Ricardo (Agba (substituted on) 57'), Gavrić (Bumba (substituted on) 88'), Đukanović (Bennette (substituted on) 62') — Marong, Kulenović • Manager: Juárez • Player of the match: Jozef Urblík, Vasas 9.4 • Best player of ETO Győr: Luka Kulenović 9.3

8 November 2026 13	Nyíregyháza	1–1	ETO Győr	Nyíregyháza
13:15 CET	Hős 46'; M. Kovács (yellow card) 67'; Toma (yellow card) 77'	Report	Đukanović 54'; Gavrić (red card) 76'; Giger (yellow card) 86'	Stadium: Városi Stadion; Attendance: 4,077; Referee: Imre Kovács; Assistant referees: Balázs Szert, Ákos Berényi
Note: • ETO Győr: Petráš — Selyem, N. Urblík, Umathum (Giger (substituted on) 64'), Štefulj (c) — Agba — Bennette, Szép, Bánáti (Csorba (substituted on) 84'), Huszár (Gavrić (substituted on) 64') — Đukanović (Marong (substituted on) 84') • Manager: Juárez • Player of the match: Viktor Đukanović, ETO Győr 7.8 • Best player of Nyíregyháza: Milán Kovács 7.4

21 November 2026 14	Ferencváros	1–3	ETO Győr	Budapest
18:30 CET	Yusuf 56'	Report	Kulenović 1', 68'; Ricardo (yellow card) 77'; Bennette 90+4'	Stadium: Groupama Aréna; Attendance: 11,547; Referee: Bence Csonka dr. Assistant referees: Vencel Tóth II, Norbert Bornemissza
Note: • ETO Győr: Petráš — Bennette, Umathum, Krpić (c) (L. Balogun (substituted on) 53'), N. Urblík, Štefulj — Bánáti (Ricardo (substituted on) 72'), Agba, Szép (Csorba (substituted on) 85') — Đukanović (Huszár (substituted on) 53'), Kulenović (Marong (substituted on) 85') • Manager: Juárez • Player of the match: Luka Kulenović, ETO Győr 9.0 • Best player of Ferencváros: Habib Maïga 7.6

27 November 2026 15	ETO Győr	v	Debrecen	Győr
19:30 CET				Stadium: ETO Park

6 December 2026 16	Zalaegerszeg	v	ETO Győr	Zalaegerszeg
14:15 CET				Stadium: ZTE Arena

12 December 2026 17	ETO Győr	v	Kisvárda	Győr
17:00 CET				Stadium: ETO Park

20 December 2026 18	Kispest-Honvéd	v	ETO Győr	Budapest
13:00 CET				Stadium: Bozsik Aréna

30 January 2027 19	ETO Győr	v	MTK	Győr
TBD				Stadium: ETO Park

6 February 2026 20	Puskás Akadémia	v	ETO Győr	Felcsút
TBD				Stadium: Pancho Aréna

13 February 2027 21	ETO Győr	v	Paks	Győr
TBD				Stadium: ETO Park

20 February 2027 22	Újpest	v	ETO Győr	Budapest
TBD				Stadium: Szusza Ferenc Stadion

27 February 2027 23	Vasas	v	ETO Győr	Budapest
TBD				Stadium: Illovszky Rudolf Stadion

6 March 2027 24	ETO Győr	v	Nyíregyháza	Győr
TBD				Stadium: ETO Park

13 March 2027 25	ETO Győr	v	Ferencváros	Győr
TBD				Stadium: ETO Park

20 March 2027 26	Debrecen	v	ETO Győr	Debrecen
TBD				Stadium: Nagyerdei Stadion

3 April 2027 27	ETO Győr	v	Zalaegerszeg	Győr
TBD				Stadium: ETO Park

10 April 2027 28	Kisvárda	v	ETO Győr	Kisvárda
TBD				Stadium: Várkerti Stadion

17 April 2027 29	ETO Győr	v	Kispest-Honvéd	Győr
TBD				Stadium: ETO Park

24 April 2027 30	MTK	v	ETO Győr	Budapest
TBD				Stadium: Hidegkuti Nándor Stadion

1 May 2027 31	ETO Győr	v	Puskás Akadémia	Győr
TBD				Stadium: ETO Park

15 May 2027 32	Paks	v	ETO Győr	Paks
TBD				Stadium: Fehérvári úti Stadion

22 May 2027 33	ETO Győr	v	Újpest	Győr
TBD				Stadium: ETO Park

Note: Round 3, ETO Győr vs Ferencváros match: On 8th August 2026, Ferencváros will play a friendly match against Real Madrid, so the Competition Committee of Hungarian Football Association has approved postponing the match to a later date.
Source: MLSZ Adatbank

=== Magyar Kupa ===
Win Draw Loss Fixtures Postponed

==== Round of 64 ====
As a second-division team, Karcag is also entering this year's Hungarian Cup season now.

13 September 2026 R64	Karcag (NB II)	1–5	ETO Győr	Karcag
15:00 CEST	Szűcs (yellow card) 23'; Szekszárdi (yellow card) 25'; K. Varga 57' (pen.); Kovalovszki (yellow card) 85'; Győri (yellow card) 90+1'	Report	Rotaru 18'; Bennette 27'; Đukanović 29'; Krpić (yellow card) 38'; Vlădoiu (yellow card) 44'; Huszár 87'; Štefulj 90'	Stadium: Lipcsey Elemér Sporttelep; Attendance: 1,200; Referee: Barnabás Drabon; Assistant referees: Balázs Buzás, István Szécsényi
Note: • ETO Győr: Megyeri — Vlădoiu, Agba (Bödő (substituted on) 46'), Kulenovic, Bennette (Selyem (substituted on) 77'), Štefulj, Krpić (c) (Umathum (substituted on) 46'), Rotaru (Szép (substituted on) 67'), Đukanović (Huszár (substituted on) 81'), N. Urblík, Ricardo • Manager: Juárez

==== Round of 32 ====
28 October 2026 R32	Zalaegerszeg (NB I)	3–1	ETO Győr	Zalaegerszeg
19:00 CET	Alfonso 30' (yellow card) 78'; Gundel-Takács (yellow card) 68'; Tiago 82'; Bumba 90+1' (o.g.)	Report	Štefulj (yellow card) 46'; Bánáti 76' (yellow card) 85'	Stadium: ZTE Arena; Attendance: 2,238; Referee: Gergő Bogár; Assistant referees: Gergő Vígh-Tarsonyi, József Aradi
Note: • ETO Győr: Megyeri — Bennette (Selyem (substituted on) 82'), N. Urblík, Krpić (c), Štefulj — Huszár (Gavrić (substituted on) 59'), Ricardo (Bánáti (substituted on) 46'), Agba (Bumba (substituted on) 74'), Szép — Kulenović, Đukanović (Marong (substituted on) 58') • Manager: Juárez

=== UEFA Champions League ===
ETO Győr will participate in the competition as the winners in the previous Nemzeti Bajnokság I (domestic league) season.

Win Draw Loss Fixtures Postponed

==== First qualifying round ====
The draw for the first qualifying round was held on 16 June 2026.

7 July 2026 1st leg	Víkingur Reykjavík (Football Association of Iceland)	1–0	(Hungarian Football Federation) ETO Győr	Reykjavík, Iceland
21:00 (19:00 UTC)	Ekroth (yellow card) 76'; Hansen 90+2'	Report	Krpić (yellow card) 88'; Csinger (yellow card) 90+3'	Stadium: Víkingsvöllur; Attendance: 1,108; Referee: Romain Lissorgue (France); Assistant referees: Hicham Zakrani, Thomas Luczynski
Note: • ETO Győr: Petráš — Vlădoiu, Csinger, Krpić, Štefulj — Vitális (c), R. Tóth — Bánáti, Gavrić (Schön (substituted on) 72'), Bumba (Ba. Bíró (substituted on) 90') — Njie (Huszár (substituted on) 85') • Manager: Juárez • Player of the match: Oliver Ekroth, Víkingur 8.3 • Best player of ETO Győr: Samuel Petráš 7.8

14 July 2026 2nd leg	ETO Győr (Hungarian Football Federation)	2–2 (2–3 agg.)	(Football Association of Iceland) Víkingur Reykjavík	Győr, Hungary
19:00 CEST (UTC+02:00)	Vitális 38' (pen.); Þorkelsson 45+1' (o.g.)	Report	Hafsteinsson 34', 55'	Stadium: ETO Park; Attendance: 6,183; Referee: Mateo Erceg (Croatia); Assistant referees: Luka Pajić, Stipe Brajković
Note: • ETO Győr: Petráš — Vlădoiu (Bánáti (substituted on) 68'), Csinger, Krpić, Štefulj — R. Tóth (Szép (substituted on) 68'), Vitális (c), Gavrić — Schön, Njie (Huszár (substituted on) 84'), Bumba (Živković (substituted on) 84')• Manager: Juárez • Player of the match: Daníel Hafsteinsson, Víkingur 8.9 • Best player of ETO Győr: Milán Vitális 7.7

Víkingur Reykjavík won 3–2 on aggregate. ETO Győr continues in the second qualifying round of UEFA Conference League.

=== UEFA Conference League ===
ETO Győr will participate in the competition as losers 2026–27 UEFA Champions League qualifying, First qualifying round.

Win Draw Loss Fixtures Postponed

The draw for the second qualifying round was held on 17 June 2026.

==== Second qualifying round ====
21 July 2026 1st leg	Atert Bissen (Luxembourg Football Federation)	2–6	(Hungarian Football Federation) ETO Győr	Bissen, Luxembourg City (Note: Atert Bissen play their home matches at Stade de Luxembourg instead of their regular stadium, Terrain ZAC Klengbousbierg, which does not meet UEFA requirements.)
20:15 CEST (UTC+02:00)	Ferber 20'; Abi (yellow card) 40' (goal) 75'	Report	Bumba 12'; Vitális 24'; R. Tóth (yellow card) 39'; Njie 44', 47'; Đukanović 83'; Bánáti 90+1'	Stadium: Stade de Luxembourg; Attendance: 1,021; Referee: Iwan Arwel Griffith (Wales); Assistant referees: Ceri Louise Williams, Harry Hendricks
Note: • ETO Győr: Petráš — Vlădoiu (Ba. Bíró (substituted on) 56'), Umathum, Krpić, Štefulj — Vitális (c), R. Tóth (Mass (substituted on) 77') — Schön, Gavrić, Bumba (Bánáti (substituted on) 56') — Njie (Đukanović (substituted on) 56') • Manager: Juárez; Player of the match: Nfansu Njie, ETO Győr 8.7 • Best player of Atert Bissen: Roman Ferber 8.2

30 July 2026 2nd leg	ETO Győr (Hungarian Football Federation)	1–1 (7–3 agg.)	(Luxembourg Football Federation) Atert Bissen	Győr, Hungary
19:00 CEST (UTC+02:00)	Njie (yellow card) 35'; Đukanović (penalty missed) 50'; Krpić 76' (pen.); Selyem (yellow card) 81'; Huszár (yellow card) 86'	Report	Ferber 28'; Zeghdane (red card) 31'; Correia (yellow card) 48'; Joel da Cruz (yellow card) 87'	Stadium: ETO Park; Attendance: 4,235; Referee: Dmytro Kubriak (Ukraine); Assistant referees: Nazariy Tsmokanych, Maryna Striletska
Note: • ETO Győr: Megyeri — Ba. Bíró, Krpić, Umathum, Štefulj — Vitális (c) (Szép (substituted on) 46'), Décsy, Bumba (Mass (substituted on) 64') — Schön (Selyem (substituted on) 61') — Đukanović (Bánáti (substituted on) 70'), Njie (Huszár (substituted on) 46') • Manager: Juárez; Player of the match: Ádám Umathum, ETO Győr 7.7 • Best player of Atert Bissen: Roman Ferber 7.5

ETO Győr won 7–3 on aggregate.

==== Third qualifying round ====
6 August 2026 1st leg	Riga (Latvian Football Federation)	1–0	(Hungarian Football Federation) ETO Győr	Riga, Latvia
19:00 CEST (20:00 UTC+3)	B. Selyem 3' (o.g.); Eduardo (yellow card) 18'; Aouani (yellow card) 73'	Report		Stadium: Skonto Stadium; Attendance: 5,194; Referee: Gal Leibovitz (Israel); Assistant referees: Matityahu Yakobov, Rostislav Talis
Note: • ETO Győr: Petráš — Umathum, N. Urblík, Krpić (c) — B. Selyem, Szép, Décsy, Schön (Csorba (substituted on) 90+1') — Bumba (Huszár (substituted on) 63') — Njie (Štefulj (substituted on) 80'), Đukanović • Manager: Juárez; Player of the match: Iago Siqueira Augusto, Riga 7.9 • Best player of ETO Győr: Nfansu Njie and Ádám Umathum 7.1 each

13 August 2026 2nd leg	ETO Győr (Hungarian Football Federation)	1–1 (1–2 agg.)	(Latvian Football Federation) Riga	Győr, Hungary
19:00 CEST	Gavrić 28' (pen.)	Report	Caio Ferreira 88'	Stadium: ETO Park; Attendance: 4,242; Referee: Oliver Reitala (Finland); Assistant referees: Jukka Honkanen, Olli Jantunen

Riga won 2–1 on aggregate.

== Statistics ==
As of match played 21 November 2026

=== Goal scorers ===
Includes all competitions for senior teams. The list is sorted by squad number when season-total goals are equal. Players with no goals not included in the list.
We indicate in parentheses how many of the goals scored by the player from penalties.

Rank	No.	Pos.	Player	Nemzeti Bajnokság I (Domestic league)	Magyar Kupa (Domestic cup)	UEFA Champions League	UEFA Conference League	Season total	Ref.
1	34	FW	(Montenegro) Viktor Đukanović	5	1	0	1	7	
2	9	FW	(Bosnia and Herzegovina) Luka Kulenović	5	0	0	0	5	
3	11	FW	(The Gambia) Nfansu Njie	2	0	0	2	4	
4	37	DF	(Slovakia) Norbert Urblík	3	0	0	0	3	
4	80	FW	(Serbia) Željko Gavrić	2 (1)	0	0	1 (1)	3 (2)	
4	90	MF	(Hungary) Kevin Bánáti	1	1	0	1	3	
4	96	FW	(Hungary) Marcell Huszár	2	1	0	0	3	
8	19	MF	(Costa Rica) Jewison Bennette	1	1	0	0	2	
8	23	DF	(Croatia) Daniel Štefulj	1	1	0	0	2	
8	24	DF	(Serbia) Miljan Krpić	1 (1)	0	0	1 (1)	2 (2)	
8	27	FW	(Hungary) Milán Vitális^{1}	0	0	1 (1)	1	2 (1)	
12	7	MF	(Nigeria) Peter Agba	1	0	0	0	1	
12	10	MF	(Romania) Claudiu Bumba	0	0	0	1	1	
12	14	FW	(Hungary) Márton Szép	1	0	0	0	1	
12	29	FW	(Moldova) Nicolae Rotaru	0	1	0	0	1	
Own goals				0	0	1	0	1	
Total				25 (2)	6 (0)	2 (1)	8 (2)	41 (5)	

^{1} Milán Vitális was transferred to AEK Athens during the summer transfer window.

=== Penalties ===
Date	Penalty Taker	Scored	Opponent	Competition
14 July 2026	(Hungary) Milán Vitális	Yes	(Football Association of Iceland) Víkingur Reykjavík (H)	UEFA Champions League, First qualifying round, Second leg
26 July 2026	(Serbia) Željko Gavrić	Yes	(Hungarian Football Federation) Vasas (A)	Nemzeti Bajnokság I, Round 1
30 July 2026	(Montenegro) Viktor Đukanović	No	(Luxembourg Football Federation) Atert Bissen (H)	UEFA Conference League, Second qualifying round, Second leg
30 July 2026	(Serbia) Miljan Krpić	Yes	(Luxembourg Football Federation) Atert Bissen (H)	UEFA Conference League, Second qualifying round, Second leg
13 August 2026	(Serbia) Željko Gavrić	Yes	(Latvian Football Federation) Riga (H)	UEFA Conference League, Third qualifying round, Second leg
3 September 2026	(Bosnia and Herzegovina) Luka Kulenović	No	(Hungarian Football Federation) Ferencváros (H)	Nemzeti Bajnokság I, Round 3
6 September 2026	(Serbia) Miljan Krpić	Yes	(Hungarian Football Federation) Kispest-Honvéd (H)	Nemzeti Bajnokság I, Round 7

Note: (H) – Home; (A) – Away

== See also ==
- List of Győri ETO FC seasons
- Győri ETO FC in European football
- List of Győri ETO FC managers
