= 2025 Knattspyrnufélagið Víkingur season =

Víkingur Reykjavík
2025 season
- Chairman: (Iceland) Björn Einarsson
- Manager: (Iceland) Sölvi Ottesen
- Stadium: Víkingsvöllur
- Besta deild karla: Winners
- Icelandic Men's Football Cup: Round 3
- UEFA Conference League: Third qualifying round
Home colours	Away colours	Third colours

The 2025 season will be Víkingur Reykjavík 116th season in the clubs history.The club will participate in the following competitions in the following year: Besta deild karla, Icelandic Men's Football Cup, UEFA Conference League.

Víkingur Reykjavík won the league title.

== Men's Football - Current Squad ==
As of 27 February 2026

Note: Flags indicate national team as defined under FIFA eligibility rules; some limited exceptions apply. Players may hold more than one non-FIFA nationality.

No.	Pos.	Nation	Player
1	GK	ISL	Ingvar Jónsson
2	DF	ISL	Sveinn Gísli Þórkelsson
4	DF	SWE	Oliver Ekroth (captain)
5	DF	ISL	Davíð Helgi Aronsson
6	DF	FRO	Gunnar Vatnhamar
7	MF	ISL	Erlingur Agnarsson
8	MF	ISL	Viktor Örlygur Andrason
9	DF	ISL	Helgi Guðjónsson
11	MF	ISL	Daníel Hafsteinsson
15	DF	ISL	Róbert Orri Þorkelsson
16	GK	ISL	Jochum Magnússon
17	FW	ISL	Atli Þór Jónasson
19	FW	ISL	Óskar Borgþórsson

No.	Pos.	Nation	Player
20	MF	DEN	Tarik Ibrahimagic
21	MF	ISL	Aron Elís Þrándarson
22	DF	ISL	Karl Friðleifur Gunnarsson
23	FW	DEN	Nikolaj Hansen
24	DF	ISL	Davíð Örn Atlason
25	FW	ISL	Valdimar Þór Ingimundarson
29	GK	ISL	Aron Snær Friðriksson
30	FW	ISL	Daði Berg Jónsson
32	MF	ISL	Gylfi Sigurðsson
34	FW	ISL	Elías Már Ómarsson
69	FW	ISL	Ármann Ingi Finnbogason
77	FW	ISL	Stígur Diljan Þórðarson
92	MF	ISL	Sveinn Margeir Hauksson

== Competitions ==
=== League Table ===
==== Results summary ====
Overall								Home						Away					
Pld	W	D	L	GF	GA	GD	Pts	W	D	L	GF	GA	GD	W	D	L	GF	GA	GD
27	17	6	4	58	31	+27	57	11	1	2	34	17	+17	6	5	2	24	14	+10

Last updated: 25 October 2025.
Source: worldfootball

===== Results by round =====
Round	1	2	3	4	5	6	7	8	9	10
Ground	H	H	A	A	H	H	A	H	A	A
Result	W	W	L	D	W	W	D	W	W	L
Position	2	1	2	2	1	1	2	1	1	1

Updated to match(es) played on 1 June 2025. Source: worldfootball
A = Away; H = Home; W = Win; D = Draw; L = Loss

==== Matches ====
7 April 2025 1	Víkingur Reykjavík	2-0	ÍBV	Reykjavík
20:00	Andrason (yellow card) 33'; Hafsteinsson (yellow card) 44' (goal) 49'; Sigurðsson (red card) 55'; Vatnhamar 79'	Report	Alex Freyr Hilmarsson (yellow card) 29'	Stadium: Víkingsvöllur; Attendance: 1,209; Referee: (Iceland) Helgi Mikael Jónasson

13 April 2025 2	Víkingur Reykjavík	4-0	KA	Reykjavík
21:15	Ingimundarson 3' 14'; Sveinn Gísli Þórkelsson (yellow card) 21'; Karl Friðleifur Gunnarsson 24'; Vilhjálmsson (yellow card) 45+1'; Helgi Guðjónsson 55'	Report	Edmundsson (yellow card) 45+1'; Guðjón Ernir Hrafnkelsson (yellow card) 50'; Hans Viktor Guðmundsson (yellow card) 74'; Ásgeir Sigurgeirsson (yellow card) 76'	Stadium: Víkingsvöllur; Attendance: 1,108; Referee: (Iceland) Vilhjálmur Alvar Þórarinsson

24 April 2025 3	Afturelding	1-0	Víkingur Reykjavík	Mosfellsbær
20:15	Andrésson (yellow card) 53'; Arnór Gauti Ragnarsson (yellow card) 58'; Hrannar Snær Magnússon 68' (pen.) (yellow card) 90+5'; Magnús Már Einarsson (yellow card) 90'	Report	Ibrahimagic (yellow card) 42'; Karl Friðleifur Gunnarsson (yellow card) 54'; Ekroth (yellow card) 67'	Stadium: Varmárvöllur; Attendance: 984; Referee: (Iceland) Gunnar Oddur Hafliðason

28 April 2025 4	Valur	1-1	Víkingur Reykjavík	Reykjavík
20:15	Pedersen 64' (pen.); Ómarsson (yellow card) 82'; Birkir Heimisson (yellow card) 83'; Lundemo (yellow card) 89'	Report	Helgi Guðjónsson 22' (pen.); Sveinn Gísli Þórkelsson (yellow card) 46'; Stígur Diljan Þórðarson (yellow card) 54'; Vatnhamar (yellow card) 63'; Jónsson (yellow card) 63'	Stadium: Hlíðarendi; Attendance: 1,369; Referee: (Iceland) Sigurður Hjörtur Þrastarson

5 May 2025 5	Víkingur Reykjavík	3-2	Fram	Reykjavík
20:15	Davíð Örn Atlason 18'; Erlingur Agnarsson 27'; Hansen (yellow card) 61'; Sigurðsson 79'; Ibrahimagic (yellow card) 90+5'	Report	Haraldur Ásgrímsson (yellow card) 7'; Vuk Oskar Dimitrijevic 37'; Róbert Hauksson 90+1'	Stadium: Víkingsvöllur; Attendance: 910; Referee: (Iceland) Elías Ingi Árnason

11 May 2025 6	Víkingur Reykjavík	3-1	FH	Reykjavík
20:15	Sveinn Gísli Þórkelsson 20' (yellow card) 22'; Hafsteinsson 37' 66'; Stígur Diljan Þórðarson (yellow card) 55'	Report	Böðvarsson 33'; Arngrímur Bjartur Guðmundsson (yellow card) 82'; Kjartan Kári Halldórsson (yellow card) 90+2'	Stadium: Víkingsvöllur; Attendance: 1,190; Referee: (Iceland) Helgi Mikael Jónasson

19 May 2025 7	Stjarnan	2-2	Víkingur Reykjavík	Garðabær
20:15	Friðjónsson (yellow card) 35'; Atlason (yellow card) 55' (goal) 70'; Örvar Eggertsson 75' (yellow card) 90+2'; Þórri Mar Þórisson (yellow card) 90'; Kjartansson (yellow card) 90+6'	Report	Hafsteinsson 30'; Sigurðsson (yellow card) 41'; Davíð Örn Atlason (yellow card) 70'; Hansen 82'; Ottesen (yellow card) 90'	Stadium: Samsung völlurinn Attendance: 836; Referee: (Iceland) Þórður Þórðarson

24 May 2025 8	Víkingur Reykjavík	2-1	ÍA	Reykjavík
20:15	Stígur Diljan Þórðarson 9'; Helgi Guðjónsson 34'; Hafsteinsson (yellow card) 77'; Ekroth (yellow card) 90+6'	Report	Marko Vardic (yellow card) 35'; Hauksson (yellow card) 35' (red card) 90+3'; Haraldsson 44'; Jón Gísli Eyland Gíslason (yellow card) 56'; Hlynur Sævar Jónsson (yellow card) 58'; Oliver Stefánsson (yellow card) 90+2'	Stadium: Víkingsvöllur; Attendance: 603; Referee: (Iceland) Vilhjálmur Alvar Þórarinsson

29 May 2025 9	Vestri	0-1	Víkingur Reykjavík	Ísafjörður
15:00	Kralj (yellow card) 27'; Gustav Kjeldsen (yellow card) 35'; Sigurbjörnsson (yellow card) 54'; Phete (yellow card) 57'	Report	Davíð Örn Atlason (yellow card) 25'; Andrason 28' (pen.); Ibrahimagic (yellow card) 44'; Vilhjálmsson (yellow card) 90+5'	Stadium: Kerecisvöllurinn; Attendance: 475; Referee: (Iceland) Sigurður Hjörtur Þrastarson

1 June 2025 10	Breiðablik	3-1	Víkingur Reykjavík	Kópavogur
20:15	Lúðvíksson (yellow card) 14'; Thomsen 17' 52' (yellow card) 85'; Margeirsson 32' (yellow card) 70'; Bjarnason (yellow card) 42'	Report	Ibrahimagic (yellow card) 63'; Stígur Diljan Þórðarson (yellow card) 66'; Vilhjálmsson 88'; Jónsson (yellow card) 90+4'	Stadium: Kópavogsvöllur; Attendance: 2,042; Referee: (Iceland) Ívar Orri Kristjánsson

=== Icelandic Men's Football Cup ===
17 April 2025 Round of 32	ÍBV	3-0	Víkingur Reykjavík	Vestmannaeyjar
17:00	Alex Freyr Hilmarsson (yellow card) 31' (goal) 54'; Sowe 47' 68'; Arnar Breki Gunnarsson (yellow card) 58'	Report	Ibrahimagic (yellow card) 10'; Atli Þór Jónasson (yellow card) 45+2'; Sveinn Gísli Þórkelsson (yellow card) 64'	Stadium: Hásteinsvöllur
