= Alex Weir =

Alex Weir may refer to:

- Alex Weir (cricketer) (1921–2006), Australian cricketer
- Alex Weir (musician), American guitarist
- Alex Weir (footballer, born 1916) (1916–2003), Scottish footballer
- Alex Weir (footballer, born 1879), Scottish footballer
- Alex Weir (soccer), Scottish-American soccer player
