= Yuri Illichev =

Soviet footballer and football coach (1927-1988)

Yuri Ilichev
- Yuri Illichev in 1976

Personal information
- Full name: Yuri Petrovich Ilichev
- Date of birth: 8 December 1927
- Place of birth: Moscow, USSR
- Date of death: 10 February 1988 (aged 60)
- Place of death: Moscow, USSR

Senior career*
Years	Team	Apps	(Gls)
- Lokomotiv Moscow
1953	CVSK VMF Moskva		

Managerial career
- 1959–1965: Spartak Kostroma
- 1969–1971: Iraq
- 1973–1974: Valur
- 1976–1978: Valur
- 1978–1979: Víkingur
- 1978–1979: Iceland
- * Club domestic league appearances and goals

Dr. Yuri Ilichev (Russian: Ильичев Юрий Петрович, Icelandic: Júrí Ilitchev; 8 December 1927 – 10 February 1988) was the coach of the national football teams of Iraq and Iceland.

Little is known about the Soviet trainer, one of only a handful of coaches from the USSR that worked outside the Iron Curtain. The trainer from Moscow held a doctorate in Sports science and was appointed as head coach of Spartak Kostroma in November 1959, and spent six years at the club. It has been reported that he worked in Bulgaria, East Germany and Poland, though he may have worked or taught Physical education at universities in those countries. He spent many years in Iraq and Iceland writing up his thesis on youth players and football, which he published in 1975. Only ten years earlier, he had gained a doctorate in Sports pedagogy.

In 1969, the Iraq Football Association appointed the Soviet trainer as head coach of the Iraq national football team, military team and youth team, and managed some impressive results including the 3–0 thrashing of East Germany's national side by the Iraqi youth team (playing under the name of Baghdad Youth XI) on 12 December 1969 with a hat-trick from young outside right Falih Abid Hajim.

The coach continued to build the national side around his youth team players such as Jalal Abdul Rahman, Rahim Karim, Falah Hassan, and Ali Kadhim, with his influential captain and midfield general Douglas Aziz however after a surprising 1–0 defeat to Lebanon in a 1972 Olympic qualifier in Beirut, the coach's contract with the Iraq FA had finished and he returned to Moscow to work as a scientific worker at the Central State Institute of Physical Culture.

In 1973, after an agreement between the Icelandic and the Soviet consul in Iceland, it was agreed that they would send Dr. Ilichev to coach Valur. In only a couple of years, he managed to form a strong selection however after his contract ended the Soviet authorities did not agree to an extension to remain in Iceland, and he returned to teach Physical Education in Moscow. He returned in 1976 and managed the team for two years before moving to Víkingur until the Soviet authorities called the coach back to Moscow. His compatriot Yuri Sedov was offered to Víkingur in his place and he went on to win the league title with the club, with the team that Ilichev had built.

He went on to coach both Iceland and the Icelandic youth team from 1978–1979 and Icelandic clubs Valur (1974–1978) and Víkingur (1978–1979)
