= Kristinn Björnsson (footballer) =

Icelandic footballer

Personal information
- Date of birth: 13 September 1955 (age 71)
- Position: Forward

Senior career*
Years	Team	Apps	(Gls)
1973–1976	Valur		
1977–1980	ÍA		
1981	Vålerenga		
1982–1983	Kvik Halden		
1984	Leiftur		
1985	Valur	6	(0)
1986–1987	Stjarnan		
1989	UMFS Dalvík		

International career
1973–1974	Iceland U-19	8	(3)
1974–1977	Iceland	2	(1)

Managerial career
- 1993–1994: Valur
- 1995: Valur
- 1995–1996: Iceland WNT
- 1997–1999: Valur
- * Club domestic league appearances and goals

Kristinn Björnsson (born 13 September 1955) is an Icelandic former football striker and later manager. He won the Norwegian championship with Vålerenga in 1981.

Following his playing career, he manged Valur men's team and the Iceland women's national team.
