= Axel Andrésson =

Icelandic football pioneer and club founder

Axel Andrésson (November 22, 1895 – June 13, 1961) was a pioneer of Icelandic football and founder of football club Víkingur FC.
He was the son of Andrés Andrésson, a tradesman and Kristin Pálsdóttir, a housewife.

Axel was the mainspring for Víkingur Reykjavik in the club's early years, serving as its first chairman and coach from years 1908-1924 and 1930-1932.
He was the first to become a licensed football referee at ÍSÍ - National Olympic and Sports Association of Iceland.

After being appointed as a coach at ÍSÍ in 1941, Axel held various sports workshops throughout Iceland, focusing upon football and handball intertwined with athletics and other sports. In the workshops, Axel introduced new ideas and specific methods to coaching, later to become synonymous with him as the "Axel-Systems".
