= Efraim Bödő =

Romanian professional footballer

Personal information
- Full name: Efraim Zoltán Bödő
- Date of birth: 1 February 2007 (age 19)
- Place of birth: Valea lui Mihai, Romania
- Height: 1.79 m (5 ft 10 in)
- Position: Attacking midfielder

Team information
- Current team: Győr
- Number: 21

Youth career
- –2021: Unirea Valea lui Mihai
- 2021–2024: FK Csíkszereda

Senior career*
Years	Team	Apps	(Gls)
2024–2026	FK Csíkszereda	57	(3)
2026–	Győr	1	(0)

International career^{‡}
2025	Romania U18	4	(0)
2025–2026	Romania U19	9	(0)
- * Club domestic league appearances and goals as of 6 September 2026 ‡ National team caps and goals as of 31 March 2026

Efraim Zoltán Bödő (born 1 February 2007) is a Romanian professional footballer who plays as an attacking midfielder for Nemzeti Bajnokság I club Győr.

== Club career ==
Bödő made his Liga I debut for FK Csíkszereda in a 2–2 home draw against Dinamo București, on 14 July 2025 managing to score in the 11th minute.

=== Győr ===
On 26 August 2026, he was signed by Nemzeti Bajnokság I club Győr.

== International career ==
Bödő has represented Romania at under-18 level.

== Personal life ==
Bödő is of Hungarian ethnicity.

== Career statistics ==
=== Club ===
As of match played 13 September 2026

Appearances and goals by club, season and competition
Club	Season	League			National cup (Note: Includes Cupa României, Magyar Kupa)		Europe		Other		Total	
Club	Season	Division	Apps	Goals	Apps	Goals	Apps	Goals	Apps	Goals	Apps	Goals
FK Csíkszereda	2024–25	Liga II	21	0	2	0	—		—		23	0
FK Csíkszereda	2025–26	Liga I	32	3	1	0	—		—		33	3
FK Csíkszereda	2026–27	Liga I	4	0	1	0	—		—		5	0
FK Csíkszereda	Total		57	3	4	0	–		–		61	3
ETO Győr	2026–27	Nemzeti Bajnokság I	1	0	1	0	—		—		2	0
Career total			58	3	5	0	—		—		63	3
