= Roland Bergström =

Swedish footballer and manager

Personal information
- Place of birth: Sweden

Managerial career
- Years: Team
- 1947: Iceland

Roland Bergström was a Swedish football manager and former player. He managed the Icelandic national team in 1947.
