= Tarik Ibrahimagic =

Danish footballer (born 2001)

Personal information
- Date of birth: 23 January 2001 (age 25)
- Place of birth: Odense, Denmark
- Height: 1.84 m (6 ft 0 in)
- Position: Midfielder

Team information
- Current team: Víkingur Reykjavik
- Number: 20

Youth career
- 2005–2015: OKS
- 2015–2020: OB

Senior career*
Years	Team	Apps	(Gls)
2020–2022	OB	7	(0)
2022–2023	Næstved	7	(0)
2023–2024	Vestri	28	(0)
2024–	Víkingur Reykjavik	49	(5)

International career
2019–2020	Denmark U19	3	(0)
- * Club domestic league appearances and goals as of 1 November 2026

Tarik Ibrahimagic (born 23 January 2001) is a Danish professional footballer who plays as a midfielder for Icelandic club Víkingur Reykjavik.

== Honours ==
=== Club ===
Víkingur Reykjavik

- Úrvalsdeild (2): 2025, 2026

== Club career ==
=== OB ===
Ibrahimagic played as a youth for OKS, before joining OB as an under-14 player. Ibrahimagic went on a training camp with OB's first team squad in the winter 2020 in Turkey and was subsequently included in the first-team squad the first two Superliga matches. He got his official debut for OB on 1 June 2020 against AGF in the Danish Superliga. Ibrahimagic started on the bench, before replacing Oliver Lund in the 80th minute.

After a good season with 18 games for OB's U19 team - who won the 2019/20 U19 league - Ibrahimagic signed his first two-year professional contract on 11 May 2020, which also included a permanent promotion to the first team squad.

On 22 April 2022 it was confirmed, that Ibrahimagic was one out of a few players, that would leave the club at the end of the season, due to the expiration of their contracts.

=== Næstved ===
On 9 June 2022, Ibrahimagic joined Danish 1st Division side Næstved Boldklub. After just eight official appearances in the shirt, the club confirmed on 15 July 2023, that Ibrahimagic's contract had been terminated by mutual consent.

=== Iceland ===
On 25 July 2023, Ibrahimagic joined Icelandic 1. deild karla club Vestri on a one-year contract. And on his debut in their 3–0 win over Grotta he replaced Benedikt Waren in the 71' minute and got a yellow card in the 81' minute.

In August 2024, Ibrahimagic was bought by Víkingur Reykjavik, where he was given a contract until the end of 2026.

== International career ==
Born in Denmark, Ibrahimagic is of Bosnian descent through his father and mother. He is a youth international for Denmark, having represented the Denmark U19s.

== Career statistics ==
=== Club ===
As of 14 August 2024

Appearances and goals by club, season and competition
Club	Season	League			National Cup		Continental		Total	
Club	Season	Division	Apps	Goals	Apps	Goals	Apps	Goals	Apps	Goals
OB	2019-20	Danish Superliga	2	0	—		—		2	0
OB	2020-21	Danish Superliga	2	0	2	0	—		4	0
OB	2021-22	Danish Superliga	3	0	2	0	—		5	0
OB	Total		7	0	4	0	—		11	0
Næstved	2022-23	1. Division	7	0	1	0	—		8	0
Vestri	2023	1. deild karla	13	0	—		—		13	0
Vestri	2024	Besta deild karla	15	0	1	0	—		16	0
Vestri	Total		28	0	1	0	—		29	0
Víkingur Reykjavik	2024	Besta deild karla	1	0	—		1 (Note: Appearance(s) in UEFA Europa Conference League)	0	2	0
Career Total			43	0	6	0	1	0	50	0
