= Luis Pérez =

Luis Pérez may refer to:

== Sportspeople ==
=== Association football ===
- Luis Pérez (footballer, born 1906) (1906–1963), Mexican footballer
- Luís Alonso Pérez (1922–1972), Brazilian football manager
- Luis Pérez (Colombian footballer) (born 1957), Colombian footballer
- Luis Pérez (footballer, born 1965), Chilean football player and manager
- Luis Pérez (footballer, born 1969), Chilean football player and manager
- Luis Pérez (footballer, born 1971), Spanish footballer
- Luis Ernesto Pérez (born 1981), Mexican footballer
- Luis Pérez (footballer, born 1989), Mexican football midfielder
- Luis Pérez (footballer, born 1995), Spanish footballer

=== Other sports ===
- Luis Pérez-Sala (born 1959), Spanish race-car driver
- Luis Pérez García (born 1966), Spanish racing cyclist
- Luis Alberto Pérez-Rionda (born 1969), Cuban athlete
- Luis Pérez Companc (born 1972), Argentine rally driver
- Luis Deines Pérez (born 1973), Puerto Rican boxer
- Luis Pérez Rodríguez (born 1974), Spanish cyclist
- Luis Alberto Pérez (born 1978), Nicaraguan boxer
- Luis Pérez Romero (born 1980), Spanish cyclist
- Luis Pérez (pitcher) (born 1985), Dominican pitcher
- Luis Pérez (third baseman), Negro leagues baseball player
- Luis Perez (American football) (born 1994), American quarterback

== Others ==
- Luis Eduardo Pérez (1774–1841), interim president of Uruguay
- Luis Guillermo Pérez, Colombian human rights lawyer
- Luis Pérez Fernández (born 1990), Spanish politician and social media personality
- Luis Pérez Ortiz (born 1955), Puerto Rican politician
- Luis Fernando Pérez (born 1977), Spanish classical pianist
