= Valur (men's football) =

Association football club in Reykjavík, Iceland

- Full name: Knattspyrnufélagið Valur
- Nicknames: Valsarar; Hlíðarendapiltar
- Founded: 11 May 1911; 115 years ago
- Ground: Hlíðarendi, Reykjavík
- Capacity: 1,524
- Chairman: Björn Steinar Jónsson
- Manager: Hermann Hreiðarsson
- League: Besta deild karla
- 2026: Besta deild karla, 8th of 12
- Website: www.valur.is/fotbolti
Home colours	Away colours

The Valur men's football team, commonly known as Valur (Icelandic pronunciation: [ˈvaːlʏr̥], lit. 'Gyrfalcon'), is the men's football department of the Knattspyrnufélagið Valur multi-sport club. The club is based in Reykjavík, Iceland, and currently plays in the Besta deild karla, the top league of men's football in Iceland. The team plays its home games at Hlíðarendi, close to downtown Reykjavík. The team's colours are red and white. Valur has spent most of its time in the top-flight of Icelandic football, spending only three seasons outside the top tier. Valur is one of the most successful football clubs in Iceland, with 23 Icelandic championships.

== Early beginnings ==
Football arrived in Iceland before the end of the nineteenth century, and as elsewhere, became popular amongst young people. In 1908, a youth group was founded within the YMCA in Reykjavík, led by Reverend Friðrik Friðriksson. The boys of the group were active in a number of indoor and outdoor activities.

By 1911, several football clubs had been founded in Reykjavík, though the sport was still in its infancy in Iceland. On 11 May 1911, six boys founded the YMCA Football Club, changing the name of the club to Val later the same year. The story goes that when these founders of the club were working on fixing their football field at Melunum in Reykjavík, a falcon hovered over their heads and that's when they got the idea to call the club Val. At the inauguration of the first Valsvallar in Melunum in the fall of 1911, Friðrik gave a speech in which he encouraged the boys to continue on the path they had set out on and also reminded them of honesty in play and work and that peace, love, unity, beauty and energy should reign in the work and nothing indecent and ugly should ever flourish. In 1915, Valur participated for the first time in the Icelandic national championship in football, but in addition to them, Fram and KR competed in the tournament. In 1916, a junior division was founded in the association, called Væringjar, for boys in YMCA up to the age of 15 who from that age joined Valur. In 1919, this group of young Valsmen won the so-called fallmeet, becoming the club's first tournament victory.

== The first championship titles ==
Valur won its first Icelandic championship in 1930, nineteen years after the club was founded, a long-awaited dream had come true. Reverend Friðrik told the newly crowned champions that a victory would certainly be good, but one should not overestimate or show arrogance. Reverend Friðrik always had various advice for the Valsmen about boyish play and pomp. National championships would be sporadic: in 1933, from 1935 to 1938, in 1940 and from 1942 to 1945.

== National champions under the management of Ian Ross ==
In March 1984, the Valur football department signed a contract with Ian Ross, a Scotsman who previously had, among other things, played football for Aston Villa and Liverpool but also had a lot of experience as a coach, meaning that Ross would take over the coaching of the men's football team. Ross quickly proved himself as a coach; the team finished second in the league in his first season. Ross led the team to victory in the top tier in football a year later and repeated the feat in 1987.

== Domestic success ==
Valur participated in the Icelandic men's football tournament for the first time in 1915 and, as stated previously, won the Icelandic championship for the first time in 1930. In total, the club has won the Icelandic championship 23 times, the most recent success being in 2020. This makes Valur the second most decorated club in Iceland.

== Recent history ==
In a reorganization in the fall of 2022, following a disappointing season, Valur appointed Arnar Grétarsson as manager soon after he was sacked as manager of KA Akureyri, after having notable success as manager in the northern capital the Icelandic giants hope to bring stability to their setup. Along with Arnar Grétarsson Valur appointed Sigurður Höskuldsson former manager of Leiknir Reykjavík as assistant manager.

After the 2022/2023 season, Sigurður Höskuldsson and Valur parted ways, with Sigurður taking the manager job at Þór Akureyri. Valur appointed former captain and most capped player Haukur Páll Sigurðsson as assistant manager.

In March 2024 the club signed Icelandic international Gylfi Sigurdsson on a two-year contract, a move widely regarded as the biggest signing of an Icelandic club. This signing signalled the club's intention to pursue a championship in the 2024 season.

In August 2024 the club and Arnar Grétarsson parted ways and Icelandic Serbian Srdjan Tufegdzic took over on a 3 year contract. Knowing the club well, having been a part of a championship winning coaching team of Valur in the 2020 season.

2025 season started with mixed result, although Valur won the league cup in the runup to the league. After the 2025 season concluded, in a major overhaul of backroom staff Túfa, his assistant mangager and goalkeeping coach were let go and a completely new backroom staff under the leadership of former Icelandic national player Hermann Hreiðarsson was brought in. The move sparked major controversy among supporters of the Icelandic giants.

== European competition ==
Valur first competed in Europe at the 1966–67 European Cup Winners' Cup Preliminary Round, drawing 1–1 with Standard Liège but ultimately losing on aggregate 9–2. Since then, the club has participated in European competition twenty times, never advancing beyond the second round of any tournament.

Valur holds the record attendance for a football match in Iceland, with 18,243 spectators in attendance for their match against Benfica in 1968.

Season	Competition	Round	Club	Home	Away	Aggregate
1966–67	UEFA Cup Winners' Cup	Preliminary Round	(Belgium) Standard Liège	1–1	1–8	2–9
1967–68	European Cup	First round	(Luxembourg) Jeunesse Esch	1–1	3–3	4–4(a)
1967–68	European Cup	Second Round	(Hungary) Vasas	0–6	1–5	1–11
1968–69	European Cup	First round	(Portugal) Benfica	0–0	1–8	1–8
1974–75	UEFA Cup	First round	(Northern Ireland) Portadown	0–0	1–2	1–2
1975–76	European Cup Winners' Cup	First round	(Scotland) Celtic	0–2	0–7	0–9
1977–78	European Cup	First round	(Northern Ireland) Glentoran	1–0	0–2	1–2
1978–79	European Cup Winners' Cup	First round	(East Germany) 1. FC Magdeburg	1–1	0–4	1–5
1979–80	European Cup	First round	(Germany) Hamburg	0–3	1–2	1–5
1981–82	European Cup	First round	(England) Aston Villa	0–2	0–5	0–7
1985–86	UEFA Cup	First round	(France) Nantes	2–1	0–3	2–4
1986–87	European Cup	First round	(Italy) Juventus	0–4	0–7	0–11
1987–88	UEFA Cup	First round	(East Germany) Wismut Aue	1–1	0–0	1–1(a)
1988–89	European Cup	First round	(France) Monaco	1–0	0–2	1–2
1989–90	European Cup Winners' Cup	First round	(East Germany) BFC Dynamo	1–2	1–2	2–4
1991–92	European Cup Winners' Cup	First round	(Switzerland) Sion	0–1	1–1	1–2
1992–93	European Cup Winners' Cup	First round	(Portugal) Boavista	0–0	0–3	0–3
1993–94	European Cup Winners' Cup	Qualifying round	(Finland) MyPa	3–1	1–0	4–1
1993–94	European Cup Winners' Cup	First round	(Scotland) Aberdeen	0–3	0–4	0–7
2006–07	UEFA Cup	First qualifying round	(Denmark) Brøndby IF	0–0	1–3	1–3
2008–09	UEFA Champions League	First qualifying round	(Belarus) BATE Borisov	0–1	0–2	0–3
2016–17	UEFA Europa League	First qualifying round	(Denmark) Brøndby IF	1–4	0–6	1–10
2017–18	UEFA Europa League	First qualifying round	(Latvia) Ventspils	1–0	0–0	1–0
2017–18	UEFA Europa League	Second qualifying round	(Slovenia) Domžale	1–2	2–3	3–5
2018–19	UEFA Champions League	First qualifying round	(Norway) Rosenborg	1–0	1–3	2–3
2018–19	UEFA Europa League	Second qualifying round	(Andorra) FC Santa Coloma	3–0	0–1	3–1
2018–19	UEFA Europa League	Third qualifying round	(Moldova) Sheriff Tiraspol	2–1	0–1	2–2 (a)
2019–20	UEFA Champions League	First qualifying round	(Slovenia) Maribor	0–3	0–2	0–5
2019–20	UEFA Europa League	Second qualifying round	(Bulgaria) Ludogorets Razgrad	1–1	0–4	1–5
2021–22	UEFA Champions League	First qualifying round	(Croatia) Dinamo Zagreb	0–2	2–3	2–5
2021–22	UEFA Europa Conference League	Second qualifying round	(Norway) Bodø/Glimt	0–3	0–3	0–6
2024–25	UEFA Conference League	First qualifying round	(Albania) Vllaznia	2−2	4-0	6–2
2024–25	UEFA Conference League	Second qualifying round	(Scotland) St Mirren	0–0	1–4	1–4
2025–26	UEFA Conference League	First qualifying round	(Estonia) Flora	3–0	2−1	5−1
2025–26	UEFA Conference League	Second qualifying round	(Lithuania) Kauno Žalgiris	1−2	1−1	2−3
2026–27	UEFA Conference League	Second qualifying round	(Bosnia and Herzegovina) Zrinjski Mostar	1–0	2–2	3–2
2026–27	UEFA Conference League	Third qualifying round	(Denmark) Nordsjælland	0–2	0–5	0–7

== Players ==
=== Current squad ===
As of 15 August 2026

Note: Flags indicate national team as defined under FIFA eligibility rules; some limited exceptions apply. Players may hold more than one non-FIFA nationality.

No.	Pos.	Nation	Player
1	GK	ISL	Frederik Schram
3	DF	ISL	Hörður Ingi Gunnarsson
4	DF	NOR	Markus Nakkim
5	MF	ISL	Kristófer Dagur Arnarsson
7	MF	ISL	Samúel Friðjónsson
9	FW	DEN	Patrick Pedersen
10	MF	ISL	Jónatan Ingi Jónsson
11	DF	ISL	Ingimar Torbjörnsson Stöle
12	FW	ISL	Tryggvi Hrafn Haraldsson
14	FW	SWE	Albin Skoglund
15	DF	ISL	Hólmar Örn Eyjólfsson (captain)
17	MF	ISL	Lúkas Logi Heimisson

No.	Pos.	Nation	Player
19	FW	ISL	Dagur Orri Garðarsson
20	DF	ISL	Orri Sigurður Ómarsson
21	MF	ISL	Jakob Franz Pálsson
22	MF	ISL	Birkir Heimisson
24	DF	NED	Myles Veldman
25	GK	ISL	Stefán Þor Ágústsson
26	MF	ISL	Emil Sigurbjörnsson
29	MF	ISL	Shkelzen Veseli
45	MF	ISL	Þórður Sveinn Einarsson
66	DF	ISL	Ólafur Flóki Stephensen
95	GK	ISL	Tómas Petersson
97	FW	ISL	Birkir Jakob Jónsson

=== Out on loan ===
Note: Flags indicate national team as defined under FIFA eligibility rules; some limited exceptions apply. Players may hold more than one non-FIFA nationality.

No. / Pos. / Nation / Player; 33 / DF / ISL / Andi Hoti (at Afturelding until 31 December 2026)	No. / Pos. / Nation / Player

== Coaches ==
- (Iceland) Guðmundur H. Pétursson (1930)
- (Iceland) Reidar Sörensen (1933–35)
- (Scotland) Murdo MacDougall (1935–37)
- (Scotland) Murdo MacDougall & (Scotland) Robert Jack (1937–38)
- (Scotland) Murdo MacDougall (1938)
- (Scotland) Joe Devine (1939), (1948)
- (Iceland) Hermann Hermannsson (1955)
- (Iceland) Óli B. Jónsson (1967–31 December 1968)
- (Soviet Union) Yuri Illichev (1 July 1973 – 30 June 1974), (1 July 1976 – 30 June 1978)
- (Hungary) Gyula Nemes (1978–79)
- (Germany) Volker Hofferbert (1980)
- (Germany) Klaus-Jürgen Hilpert (1982)
- (Germany) Claus Peter (1982–83)
- (Scotland) Ian Ross (1 January 1984 – 31 December 1987)
- (Iceland) Hörður Helgason (1 January 1988 – 1 August 1989)
- (Iceland) Guðmundur Þorbjörnsson (1989)
- (Iceland) Ingi Björn Albertsson (1990–92)
- (Iceland) Kristinn Björnsson (1992–94)
- (Iceland) Hörður Hilmarsson (1995)
- (Iceland) Kristinn Björnsson (1995)
- (Iceland) Sigurður Grétarsson (1996–97)
- (Iceland) Kristinn Björnsson (1998–99)
- (Iceland) Ingi Björn Albertsson (1999)
- (Bosnia and Herzegovina) (Iceland) Ejub Purišević (2000–01)
- (Iceland) Þorlákur Árnason (2002–03)
- (Iceland) Njáll Eiðsson (2004)
- (Iceland) Willum Þór Þórsson (1 October 2004 – July 2009)
- (Iceland) Atli Eðvaldsson (4 July 2009 – September 2009)
- (Iceland) Gunnlaugur Jónsson (October 2009 – 31 December 2010)
- (Iceland) Kristján Guðmundsson (1 January 2011 – 31 December 2012)
- (Iceland) Magnús Gylfason (1 January 2013 – 31 October 2014)
- (Iceland) Ólafur Jóhannesson (31 October 2014 – 2019)
- (Iceland) Heimir Guðjónsson (2019–2022)
- (Iceland) Ólafur Jóhannesson (17 July 2022 - 31 Oct 2022)
- (Iceland) Arnar Grétarsson (31 Oct 2022–1 Aug 2024)
- (Serbia) (Iceland) Srdjan Tufegdzic (1 Aug 2024–27 Oct 2025)
- (Iceland) Hermann Hreiðarsson (27 Oct 2025 - Present)

== Honours ==
- Úrvalsdeild
  - Champions (23): 1930, 1933, 1935, 1936, 1937, 1938, 1940, 1942, 1943, 1944, 1945, 1956, 1966, 1967, 1976, 1978, 1980, 1985, 1987, 2007, 2017, 2018, 2020 (Note: Due to the COVID-19 pandemic, the season was cancelled with four games left to play. Valur was awarded the title as the team in first at the time of suspension.)
- Icelandic Cup
  - Champions (11): 1965, 1974, 1976, 1977, 1988, 1990, 1991, 1992, 2005, 2015, 2016
- Icelandic League Cup
  - Champions (5): 2008, 2011, 2018, 2023, 2025
- Icelandic Super Cup
  - Champions (11): 1977, 1979, 1988, 1991, 1992, 1993, 2006, 2008, 2016, 2017, 2018
