= Jóhannes Atlason =

Icelandic footballer and manager

Personal information
- Full name: Jóhannes Sandhólm Atlason
- Date of birth: September 7, 1944 (age 82)
- Place of birth: Iceland
- Position: Right back

Youth career
- 1954–1963: Fram

Senior career*
Years	Team	Apps	(Gls)
1963–1971	Fram		
1972–1973	ÍBA Akureyri		

International career
1966–1972	Iceland	24	(0)

Managerial career
- 1972–1973: ÍBA Akureyri
- 1974–1976: Fram
- 1977–1979: KA
- 1981: Iceland U-19
- 1982–1983: Iceland
- 1984: Fram
- 1985–1988: Þór Akureyri
- 1989–1991: Stjarnan
- 1993: ÍBV
- * Club domestic league appearances and goals

Jóhannes Sandhólm Atlason (born 7 September 1944) is an Icelandic football manager and former player. He played as a defender for Fram Reykjavík from 1964 to 1972 and ÍBA Akureyri in 1973. He managed the Icelandic national team from 1982 to 1983, and ÍB Vestmannaeyja in 1993.
