= Franz Köhler =

Austrian footballer and manager

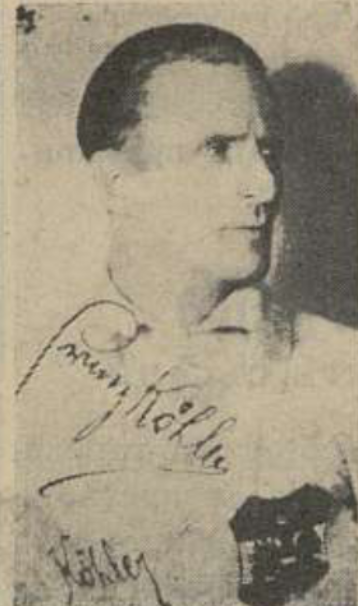

Personal information
- Date of birth: 18 March 1901
- Place of birth: Austria
- Date of death: 20 April 1982 (aged 81)
- Position: Goalkeeper

Senior career*
Years	Team	Apps	(Gls)
1920	Kaisermühlen		
1920–1921	Olympia		
1922–1923	Donau		
1923	Straßenbahn		
1924	Elektra		
1924–1925	Rapid Vienna		
1925–1927	Ostmark		
1927–1933	Brigittenauer AC		
1933	Rasenfreunde		
1934–1935	Austria Aspern		
1935	DFC Wien		
1935–1937	SV Angern		
1937	Austria Aspern		

International career
1926–1927	Austria	3	(0)

Managerial career
- 1938 - 1943: Slavia Sofia
- 1940–1941: Bulgaria
- 1950–1951: Eintracht Osnabrück
- 1953: Iceland
- 1954–1956: Go Ahead Eagles
- * Club domestic league appearances and goals

Franz Köhler (18 March 1901 – 20 April 1982) was an Austrian football manager and former player. He managed the Icelandic national team from 1953 to 1954.

He also coached Bulgaria, Eintracht Osnabrück and Go Ahead Eagles.
