= Alex Weir (footballer, born 1916) =

Scottish footballer and manager

Personal information
- Full name: Alexander Weir
- Date of birth: 20 October 1916
- Place of birth: Bathgate, Scotland
- Date of death: 10 January 2003 (aged 86)
- Place of death: Margate, England
- Position: Striker

Youth career
- Stoneyburn Juniors

Senior career*
Years	Team	Apps	(Gls)
1936	Preston North End		
1936–1938	Waterford United		
1938–1939	Shelbourne		
1939	Glenavon		
1939–1940	Ballymena United		
1940–1944	Glentoran		
- → Hartlepools United (guest)
- → Middlesbrough (guest)
- → Millwall (guest)
- → Tranmere Rovers (guest)
1945–1947	Watford	1	(0)
1947–1948	Northampton Town		
1948	Margate	9	(3)
- Northampton Town

Managerial career
- 1948: Margate
- 1950–1952: FC Bern
- Burma
- 1955: Hayes
- 1956–1958: Letchworth Town
- 1957: Valur
- 1957: Iceland
- 1958–1959: Hendon
- 1959–1960: Hayes
- 1961–1963: St Albans City
Medal record
Men's football
Representing Myanmar (as manager)
Asian Games
Bronze medal – third place	1954
- * Club domestic league appearances and goals

Alexander Weir (20 October 1916 – 10 January 2003) was a Scottish professional footballer born in Bathgate, who played as a striker.

He represented Preston North End, Waterford United, Shelbourne, Glenavon, Ballymena United, Glentoran, Hartlepools United, Middlesbrough, Millwall, Tranmere Rovers, Watford, Northampton Town and Margate.

After his playing career, he became manager of Margate, FC Bern, Burma, Hayes, Letchworth Town, Valur, Iceland, Hendon, Hayes and St Albans City.

== Honours ==
Shelbourne

- FAI Cup: 1938–39

Ballymena United

- Irish Cup: 1939–40
