= Yuri Sedov =

Soviet footballer and manager

Personal information
- Full name: Yuri Sergeyevich Sedov
- Date of birth: March 4, 1929
- Place of birth: Moscow, USSR
- Date of death: April 4, 1995 (aged 66)
- Place of death: Moscow, Russia
- Position: Defender

Senior career*
Years	Team	Apps	(Gls)
1947–1959	FC Spartak Moscow	176	(2)

International career
1954–1955	USSR	3	(0)

Managerial career
- 1965: Volga Kalinin
- 1972–1976: Maaref Kabul (Afghanistan)
- 1977–1979: USSR (assistant)
- 1980–1982: Vikingur
- 1983–1985: USSR U-21 (assistant)
- 1987–1989: Vikingur
- 1990–1992: KS Siglufjörður (Iceland)
- * Club domestic league appearances and goals

Yuri Sergeyevich Sedov (Russian: Юрий Серге́евич Седов; March 4, 1929, in Moscow – April 4, 1995, in Moscow) was a Soviet football player and manager.

== Coaching Honours ==
- Iceland Premier League winner: 1981, 1982

== Player Honours ==
- Soviet Top League winner: 1952, 1953, 1958.
- Soviet Cup winner: 1950

== International career ==
Sedov made his debut for USSR on September 8, 1954 in a friendly against Sweden.
