= Víkingur Reykjavík =

- Full name: Knattspyrnufélagið Víkingur
- Nicknames: Víkingur, Vikes (Víkingar)
- Founded: 21 April 1908; 118 years ago
- Ground: Víkingsvöllur
- Capacity: 1,450
- Club chairman: Björn Einarsson
- FC chairman: Heimir Gunnlaugsson
- Manager: Sölvi Ottesen
- League: Besta deild karla
- 2026: Besta deild karla, 1st of 12 (champions)
- Website: vikingur.is
Home colours	Away colours	European colours

Víkingur Reykjavík, officially named Knattspyrnufélagið Víkingur (Icelandic pronunciation: [ˈkʰnahtˌspɪ(r)tnʏˌfjɛːˌlaijɪð ˈviːciŋkʏr̥], lit. 'Viking Football Club' (Note: Knattspyrnufélagið is the definite form of Knattspyrnufélag, meaning 'the football club'.)) and also known as Vikingur F.C., is a professional Icelandic sports club based in the Fossvogur neighbourhood of Reykjavík. It is one of the oldest sports clubs in Iceland, founded on 21 April 1908. Originally founded as a football club, it is now a multi-sport club that also operates divisions in handball, tennis, table tennis, karate and skiing. All sports include both male and female teams.

Its men's football team currently plays in the top-tier Besta deildin and has won eight national championship titles and five Cup titles.

Víkingur's handball department is one of the most successful ones in Iceland, with its men's team having won eight national championships and the women's handball team having won three national championships.

== Crest and colours ==
=== Club crest ===
Þorbjörn Þórðarson, who was the chairman of the Vikingur in the period of 1943–44, designed the original Víkingur badge.
In the foreground of Vikingur's original crest is a brownish 19th century leather ball framed with white badges and has red and black stripes in the background.

=== Team outfit ===
Víkingur have played in red and black striped outfits since the club's early years.

== Home ground ==
=== Víkin ===
Facilities and home ground are located at Víkin since 1984 when a football pitch was first laid there. The club residence followed in 1988 and indoor facilities were built in 1991, significantly improving the overall facilities. Víkin is located in the district of Fossvogur (Háaleiti & Bústaðir), on the east side of Reykjavík.

=== Víkingsvöllur ===
The sports venue was constructed in 2004 and completed in 2005. Víkingsvöllur holds around 2000 spectators when at maximum capacity using side-stands.

== Youth training ==
The youth training program at Víkin is notable for its contribution to the Iceland national senior and youth teams, providing in recent years players such as Kári Árnason, Sölvi Ottesen, Kolbeinn Sigþórsson, Aron Elís Þrándarson and Óttar Magnús Karlsson.

== Club history ==
=== The Founding Fathers of Víkingur (1908) ===
Víkingur Reykjavik was founded on the 21 April 1908 with the purpose of financing a ball purchase for a group of boys in a Reykjavik neighborhood to play football.
The club's inaugural meeting, with 32 boys present, was held in the basement of Túngata 12 in Reykjavik.

The founding fathers of Víkingur Reykjavik Football Club were:

- Axel Andrésson (12 years old) who initially chaired the board of directors.
- Emil Thoroddsen (9 years old) who served as a secretary.
- Davíð Jóhannesson (11 years old) who took on the role of treasurer.
- Páll Andrésson and Þórður Albertsson.

=== The Unbeaten Decade (1908–1918) ===
In the first 10 years of Vikingur's history, the team failed to win in only a single match. In that period Vikingur scored 58 goals and conceded 16.
However, the team did not win a single title in that time due to them not yet having a regular senior side to play in the Icelandic Championship.

=== First Championship Titles (1918–1947) ===
The Viking's first match in the Championship took place on 9 June 1918 – when the team ensured a 5–0 victory over their rivals Valur.
Two years later the club won its first Championship title. The second Championship title came in 1924. During the first 40 years of Vikingur's history, the club did not to have any actual club facilities.

=== Residence at Suðurgata (1947–1950) ===
Vikingur's first residence was a former "Iglo officers club" in Camp Tripoli at Suðurgata which the club took on lease in the years between 1946 and 1950 by promises of being slotted an area of land south of University of Iceland at Vatnsmýri.
The residence at Camp Tripoli proved to be a true lever for the club for a period of time, since in Víkingur's first decades, meetings were held in various places in Reykjavik and the club did not have any sporting facilities.
Vikingur was later assigned an area of land in conjunction with Íþróttafélag Reykjavíkur at Vatnsmýri.

=== Hæðargarður & First Cup Win (1950–1975) ===
Following the years at Suðurgata, Víkingur continued its search for a suitable club location since the given area at Vatnsmýri was considered too small for the club.

In 1953, building constructions began for a new club house at Hæðargarður in the district of Bústaða- og smáíbúðahverfi Reykjavíkur, which at the time was being organized. However, despite the new club house, the club's working environment was poor as there were no sporting facilities or home pitch. Training continued to take place in various settings in Reykjavik.

Víkingur's first Icelandic Cup title in men's football came in the year 1971, when the team was victorious in the final over rivals UBK Kópavogur, 1–0.

=== Growth in Fossvogur (since 1976) ===
It wasn't until the year 1976 that Víkingur got assigned an area of land in Fossvogur and began to build up its residence and sporting facilities.
In general, the main service area of the club is demarcated by Fossvogsdalur, Kringlumýrarbraut, Miklabraut and Reykjanesbraut.

Much work was done to prepare the grounds in Fossvogur during the years of 1981,1982 and 1983 when the Vikingur team clinched the first consecutive football Championship- and Super Cup titles in the club's history. A couple of years later, in 1984, footballers could start training at Víkin. Construction of the indoor facilities were completed in 1991. Construction began in 2004 on the sports venue at Víkin and was inaugurated in 2005. Víkin seats around 1,200 spectators. In the 2015 season, the men's football team will take part in the UEFA Europa League, having reached the club's highest league position of 4th place since winning the Championship in 1991.

== League history ==
=== Men's football ===
- 1918–56: Division 1
- 1957–69: Division 2
- 1970: Division 1
- 1971: Division 2
- 1972: Division 1
- 1973: Division 2
- 1974–85: Division 1
- 1986–87: Division 2
- 1988–93: Division 1
- 1994: Division 2
- 1995: Division 1
- 1996–98: Division 2
- 1999: Division 1
- 2000–03: Division 2
- 2004: Division 1
- 2005: Division 2
- 2006–07: Division 1
- 2008–10: Division 2
- 2011: Division 1
- 2012–13: Division 2
- 2014–: Division 1

==== 2013 Season ====
After a period of struggle and re-organization at Víkin in the 2012 season, the Víkingur team won promotion to the football Championship.

Aron Elís Þrándarson was chosen both as the 'most promising' and 'best' player in the league.

==== 2014 Season ====
Having regained their place in the football Championship in 2013, the team finished 4th place, achieving the club's highest league position since 1991.

==== 2015 Season ====
Víkingur men's team played their first Europa League qualifiers since 1992, and admit a 2–3 defeat on aggregate against Slovenian team FC Koper.

Arnþór Ingi Kristinsson scored both of Víkingur's goals in the away clash against FC Koper. Ólafur Þórðarson parted ways with the club.

==== 2016 Season ====
Only lacking the temporal difference to challenge for a spot in the Europa League qualification the team's fate was a mid-table finish.

Óttar Magnús Karlsson was the standout player in the team as he was chosen 'most promising player' in the league.

==== 2017 Season ====
The season turned sharply by Miloš Milojević surprise resignation from the gaffers position early in the season.

This event cued the return to home of the then retired multiple championship winner and fans favourite Logi Ólafsson, who steered them to a safe mid-table finish.

==== 2018 Season ====
Memorable for lively supporters match day experiences at Víkin, the 2018 early season performance was however highly affected by sloppy pitch conditions.

Acclaimed Iceland International Sölvi Geir Ottesen made his return to Víkin - now alternatively known as the 'Homeground of Happiness'.

At the end of the season Logi Ólafsson moved back into retirement passing the managerial position to his assistant and former International Arnar Gunnlaugsson.

== Players ==
=== Men's Football - Current Squad ===
As of 7 October 2026

Note: Flags indicate national team as defined under FIFA eligibility rules; some limited exceptions apply. Players may hold more than one non-FIFA nationality.

No.	Pos.	Nation	Player
1	GK	ISL	Ingvar Jónsson
2	DF	ISL	Sveinn Gísli Þórkelsson
4	DF	SWE	Oliver Ekroth (captain)
5	DF	ISL	Sölvi Stéfansson
8	MF	ISL	Viktor Örlygur Andrason
9	DF	ISL	Helgi Guðjónsson
10	MF	ISL	Gylfi Sigurðsson
11	MF	ISL	Daníel Hafsteinsson
15	DF	ISL	Róbert Orri Þorkelsson
18	FW	ISL	Daði Berg Jónsson
19	FW	ISL	Óskar Borgþórsson
20	MF	DEN	Tarik Ibrahimagić
21	MF	ISL	Aron Elís Þrándarson

No.	Pos.	Nation	Player
22	DF	ISL	Karl Friðleifur Gunnarsson
23	FW	DEN	Nikolaj Hansen
24	DF	ISL	Davíð Örn Atlason
25	FW	ISL	Valdimar Þór Ingimundarson
27	FW	ISL	Sveinn Aron Guðjohnsen
28	FW	ISL	Elías Már Ómarsson
29	GK	ISL	Aron Snær Friðriksson
30	MF	ISL	Sveinn Margeir Hauksson
47	GK	ISL	Ögmundur Kristinsson
69	FW	ISL	Ármann Ingi Finnbogason
70	FW	ISL	Hrannar Snær Magnússon
77	FW	ISL	Stígur Diljan Þórðarson
99	GK	ISL	Uggi Jóhann Auðunsson

=== Men's Football - Out on loan ===
Note: Flags indicate national team as defined under FIFA eligibility rules; some limited exceptions apply. Players may hold more than one non-FIFA nationality.

No.	Pos.	Nation	Player
5	DF	ISL	Davíð Helgi Aronsson (at Lyngby Boldklub until 30 June 2027)
14	MF	ISL	Jóhannes Bjarnason (at FH until 5 February 2027)
16	GK	ISL	Jochum Magnússon (at Völsungur until 5 February 2027)

No.	Pos.	Nation	Player
17	FW	ISL	Atli Þór Jónasson (at Fram until 5 February 2027)
47	FW	ISL	Björgvin Brimi Andrésson (at Grótta until 5 February 2027)

== Managerial history – men's football ==
=== 20th century ===
- (Iceland) Axel Andrésson (1908–24)
- (Iceland) Guðjón Einarsson (1935–1938)
- (Germany) Fritz Buchloh (1939–)
- (Iceland) Eggert Jóhannesson (1969)(1971)
- (Iceland) Pétur Bjarnason (1973)
- (England) Billy Haydock (1976–1978)
- (England) Antony Sanders (1974–1975)
- (Soviet Union) Yuri Illichev (1978–79)
- (Soviet Union) Yuri Sedov (1980–82)(87–89)
- (Belgium) Jean-Paul Colonval (1983)
- (Iceland) Björn Árnason (1984–85)
- (Iceland) Hafsteinn Tómasson (1985)
- (Iceland) Logi Ólafsson (1990–92)
- (Iceland) Lárus Guðmundsson (1993)
- (Iceland) Kjartan Másson (1994)
- (Iceland) Pétur Pétursson (1995)
- (Iceland) Aðalsteinn Aðalsteinsson (1996)
- (Iceland) Magnús Þorvaldsson (1997)

=== 21st century ===
- (Croatia) Luka Kostić (1998–00)
- (Iceland) Björn Bjartmarz (2001)
- (Croatia) Luka Kostić (2002)
- (Iceland) Sigurður Jónsson (2003–05)
- (Iceland) Magnús Gylfason (2006–07)
- (Denmark) Jesper Tollefsen (2007–08)
- (Iceland) Leifur Garðarsson (2009–11)
- (Iceland) Andri Marteinsson (2011)
- (Iceland) Bjarnólfur Lárusson (2011)
- (Iceland) Ólafur Þórðarson (2011–15)
- (Serbia) Miloš Milojević (2015–17)
- (Iceland) Logi Ólafsson (2017–18)
- (Iceland) Arnar Gunnlaugsson (2018–25)
- (Iceland) Sölvi Ottesen (2025–present)

== Notable former players ==
Following players have represented Víkingur and either made at least 100 league appearances for the club, or made at least 10 appearances for their national team.

- (Iceland) Helgi Sigurðsson
- (Iceland) Arnór Guðjohnsen
- (Iceland) Kári Árnason
- (Iceland) Sölvi Ottesen
- (Iceland) Kolbeinn Sigþórsson
- (Iceland) Aron Elís Þrándarson
- (Iceland) Óttar Magnús Karlsson
- (Republic of Ireland) Richard Keogh
- (Jamaica) Kemar Roofe

== Player records ==
=== Men's football - Most appearances ===
In the current squad, Halldór Smári is the most capped player for Víkingur with 301 matches followed by Dofri Snorrason with 186.

David Örn Atlason has 142 matches and Sölvi Geir Ottesen has 84 matches to his name. (May 2019)

Caps	Player
351	(Iceland) Magnús Þorvaldsson
314	(Iceland) Jóhannes Bárðarson
300	(Iceland) Halldór Smári Sigurðsson
273	(Iceland) Diðrik Ólafsson
251	(Iceland) Daníel Hjaltason
219	(Iceland) Sigurjón Þorri Ólafsson
212	(Iceland) Egill Atlason
206	(Iceland) Jón Ólafsson
200	(Iceland) Atli Einarsson
193	(Iceland) Björn Bjartmarz
192	(Iceland) Aðalsteinn Aðalsteinsson
192	(Iceland) Gunnar Örn Kristjánsson
192	(Iceland) Ragnar Gíslason
187	(Iceland) Eiríkur Þorsteinsson
187	(Iceland) Hörður Theódórsson
185	(Iceland) Dofri Snorrason
181	(Iceland) Lárus Huldarsson
171	(Iceland) Bjarni Lárus Hall
167	(Iceland) Heimir Karlsson
166	(Iceland) Atli Helgason
166	(Iceland) Jóhann Þorvarðarson
165	(Iceland) Haukur Armin Úlfarsson
160	(Iceland) Ívar Örn Jónsson
160	(Iceland) Kristján Jóhannes Magnússon
159	(Iceland) Gunnar Örn Kristjánsson
154	(Iceland) Ómar Torfason
153	(Iceland) Hafliði Pétursson
153	(Iceland) Þórður Marelsson
151	(Iceland) Milos Glogovac
145	(Iceland) Trausti Ívarsson
142	(Iceland) Kjartan Dige Baldursson
142	(Iceland) Óskar Tómasson
142	(Iceland) Þorvaldur Sveinn Sveinsson
140	(Iceland) Andri Marteinsson
140	(Iceland) Davíð Örn Atlason
134	(Iceland) Sumarliði Árnason
133	(Iceland) Ögmundur Kristinsson
132	(Iceland) Sigurður Egill Lárusson
128	(Iceland) Arnþór Ingi Kristinsson
128	(Iceland) Tómas Guðmundsson
126	(Iceland) Bjarni Gunnarsson
126	(Iceland) Ingvar Þór Kale
126	(Iceland) Stefán Halldórsson
126	(Iceland) Viktor Bjarki Arnarsson
126	(Iceland) Ögmundur Viðar Rúnarsson
124	(Iceland) Marteinn Guðgeirsson
122	(Iceland) Hólmsteinn Jónasson
120	(Iceland) Hörður Sigurjón Bjarnason
119	(Iceland) Höskuldur Eiríksson
119	(Iceland) Valur Adolf Úlfarsson

== European record ==
=== Men's football - European Clashes ===
Season	Competition	Round	Club	Home	Away	Agg.
1972–73	European Cup Winners' Cup	1R	(Poland) Legia Warsaw	0–2	0–9	0–11
1981–82	UEFA Cup	1R	(France) Bordeaux	0–4	0–4	0–8
1982–83	European Cup	1R	(Spain) Real Sociedad	0–1	2–3	2–4
1983–84	European Cup	1R	(Hungary) Rába ETO Győr	0–2	1–2	1–4
1992–93	UEFA Champions League	1R	(Russia) CSKA Moscow	0–1	2–4	2–5
2015–16	UEFA Europa League	1Q	(Slovenia) Koper	0–1	2–2	2–3
2020–21	UEFA Europa League	1Q	(Slovenia) Olimpija Ljubljana	—N/a	1–2 (a.e.t.)	—N/a
2022–23	UEFA Champions League	PR	(Estonia) FCI Levadia	6–1		
2022–23	UEFA Champions League	PR	(Andorra) Inter Club d'Escaldes	1–0		
2022–23	UEFA Champions League	1Q	(Sweden) Malmö FF	3–3	2–3	5–6
2022–23	UEFA Europa Conference League	2Q	(Wales) The New Saints	2–0	0−0	2−0
2022–23	UEFA Europa Conference League	3Q	(Poland) Lech Poznań	1–0	1–4 (a.e.t.)	2–4
2023–24	UEFA Europa Conference League	1Q	(Latvia) Riga	1–0	0–2	1–2
2024–25	UEFA Champions League	1Q	(Republic of Ireland) Shamrock Rovers	0−0	1–2	1–2
2024–25	UEFA Conference League	2Q	(Albania) Egnatia	0–1	2–0	2–1
2024–25	UEFA Conference League	3Q	(Estonia) Flora	1−1	2–1	3–2
2024–25	UEFA Conference League	PO	(Andorra) UE Santa Coloma	5–0	0−0	5–0
2024–25	UEFA Conference League	League phase	(Cyprus) Omonia	—N/a	0–4	19th Place
2024–25	UEFA Conference League	League phase	(Belgium) Cercle Brugge	3–1	—N/a	19th Place
2024–25	UEFA Conference League	League phase	(Bosnia and Herzegovina) Borac Banja Luka	2–0	—N/a	19th Place
2024–25	UEFA Conference League	League phase	(Armenia) Noah	—N/a	0–0	19th Place
2024–25	UEFA Conference League	League phase	(Sweden) Djurgårdens IF	1–2	—N/a	19th Place
2024–25	UEFA Conference League	League phase	(Austria) LASK	—N/a	1–1	19th Place
2024–25	UEFA Conference League	KPO	(Greece) Panathinaikos	2–1	0–2	2–3
2025–26	UEFA Conference League	1Q	(Kosovo) Malisheva	8–0	1–0	9–0
2025–26	UEFA Conference League	2Q	(Albania) Vllaznia	4–2 (a.e.t.)	1–2	5–4
2025–26	UEFA Conference League	3Q	(Denmark) Brøndby	3–0	0–4	3–4
2026–27	UEFA Champions League	1Q	(Hungary) ETO Győr	1–0	2–2	3–2
2026–27	UEFA Champions League	2Q	(Israel) Hapoel Be'er Sheva	2–1	0–2	2–3
2026–27	UEFA Europa League	3Q	(Switzerland) Thun	3–2	0–3	3–5
2026–27	UEFA Conference League	PO	(Bosnia and Herzegovina) Borac Banja Luka	1–3	1–3	2–6
2027–28	UEFA Champions League	1Q				

=== UEFA Club Ranking ===
As of 8 November 2024

Rank	Team	Points
169	(Czech Republic) Jablonec	8.210
170	(Czech Republic) Slovan Liberec	8.210
171	(Iceland) Víkingur Reykjavik	8.000
172	(Kosovo) Ballkani	8.000
173	(Hungary) Fehérvár	8.000

== Achievements & club honours ==
=== Men's football ===
==== League ====
- Icelandic League Championships (9): 1920, 1924, 1981, 1982, 1991, 2021, 2023, 2025, 2026
- First Division Championships (tier II) (5): 1969, 1971, 1973, 1987, 2010

==== Cup ====
- Icelandic Cup (5): 1971, 2019, 2021, 2022, 2023
- Icelandic Super Cup (5): 1982, 1983, 2022, 2024, 2026

=== Men's handball ===
==== League ====
- Icelandic League Championships (7): 1975, 1980, 1981, 1982, 1983, 1986, 1987
- First Division Championships (tier II) (5): 1961, 1966, 1969, 1997, 1999

==== Cup ====
- Icelandic Cup Championships (6): 1978, 1979, 1983, 1984, 1985, 1986

=== Women's handball ===
==== League ====
- Icelandic League Championships (3): 1991, 1992, 1993

==== Cup ====
- Icelandic Cup Championships (2): 1992, 1994

== Supporters ==
=== Club anthem ===
In celebration of the club's centennial anniversary in 2008, Vikingur supporters club held a competition for a new club anthem to be played at home games.
The winning song, Vikingur – 100 years, or simply: Við viljum sigur í dag Víkingar! was composed and performed by Stefán Magnússon and Freyr Eyjólfsson

=== Shirt sponsors ===
Year	Kit Manufacturer	Shirt Sponsor
1918–90	NA	NA
1991–93	Adidas	Bahco
1994–01	Lotto	Kaupthing
2002–05	Lotto	Kaupthing
2006–09	Prostar	Kaupthing
2010–13	Puma	TVG Zimsen
2014–15	Nike	TVG Zimsen
2016–2021	Macron	TVG Zimsen
2022–	Macron	Húsasmiðjan

== Staff & board 2023 ==
=== Men's football ===
- Manager: Arnar Gunnlaugsson
- Assistant Coach: Sölvi Geir Ottesen
- Strength Coach: Guðjón Örn Ingólfsson
- GK Coach: Hajrudin Čardaklija
- Physio: Rúnar Pálmarsson
- Kit Manager: Þórir Ingvarsson
- Managing Director: Haraldur V. Haraldsson
- Sports Director: Kári Árnason
- Stadium Manager: Örn I. Jóhannsson
  - Chairman: Heimir Gunnlaugsson
  - Vice chairman: Sverrir Geirdal
  - Project Manager: Benedikt Sveinsson
  - Boardmember: Hrannar Már Gunnarsson
  - gjaldgeri: Valdimar sigurðursson
  - Boardmember: Tryggvi Björnsson
  - Boardmember: Guðjón Guðmundsson
  - Head of youth development: Elías Hlynur Lárusson
