= Óli B. Jónsson =

Icelandic footballer and manager

Personal information
- Date of birth: 15 November 1918
- Place of birth: Reykjavík, Iceland
- Date of death: 8 February 2005 (aged 86)
- Position: Defender

Senior career*
Years	Team	Apps	(Gls)
1936–1950	KR	147	

International career
1949	Iceland	1	(0)

Managerial career
- 1945: KR
- 1947–1951: KR
- 1951: Iceland
- 1953: Knattspyrnufélagið Þróttur
- 1954–1955: KR
- 1958: Iceland
- 1958–1961: KR
- 1960: Iceland
- 1962: Valur
- 1963: ÍBV
- 1964–1965: Keflavík
- 1967–1968: Valur
- 1969–1970: KR
- 1973–1974: UMF Selfoss
- * Club domestic league appearances and goals

Óli B. Jónsson (18 November 1918 – 8 February 2005) was an Icelandic football manager and player. He managed the Iceland national team in 1951, 1958 and 1960.

He also coached KR, Keflavík, Valur, UMF Selfoss.
