= Karl Guðmundsson =

Icelandic football manager and player

Personal information
- Full name: Karl M. Guðmundsson
- Date of birth: 28 January 1924
- Place of birth: Iceland
- Date of death: 24 June 2012 (aged 88)
- Position: Defender

Senior career*
| Years | Team | Apps | (Gls) |
- Fram

International career
| 1946–1954 | Iceland | 10 | (0) |

Managerial career
- 1948: ÍA
- 1952–1954: Fram
- 1954–1956: Iceland
- 1956: Fram
- 1958: Lillestrøm SK
- 1959: Fram
- 1959: Iceland
- 1960: Lillestrøm SK
- 1961: ÍBH
- 1961: Iceland
- 1962: Sandefjord BK
- 1963–1966: Iceland
- 1964: KR
- 1966–1968: Fram
- * Club domestic league appearances and goals

Karl M. Guðmundsson (28 January 1924 – 24 June 2012) was an Icelandic football manager and former player. He managed the Iceland national team from 1954 to 1956. He also coached Lillestrøm SK, KR, Fram.
