= Norbert Urblík =

Slovak footballer (born 2004)

Personal information
- Date of birth: 18 April 2004 (age 22)
- Place of birth: Šahy, Slovakia
- Height: 1.88 m (6 ft 2 in)
- Position: Centre-back

Team information
- Current team: ETO FC Győr
- Number: 37

Youth career
- –2020: Győr

Senior career*
Years	Team	Apps	(Gls)
2020–2023	Győr	5	(0)
2023–2024	Dunajská Streda	0	(0)
2024	→ Győr (loan)	3	(0)
2025	Győr II	0	(0)
2025–	Győr	0	(0)
2026–	→ ŠTK 1914 Šamorín (loan)	2	(0)
- * Club domestic league appearances and goals

Norbert Urblík (born 18 April 2004) is a Slovak professional footballer who plays as a centre-back for second division side FC ŠTK 1914 Šamorín, on loan from Győri ETO FC.

== Club career ==
=== Youth ===
Urblík began playing football in his native town of Šahy. In 2017, he joined the ETO FC Győr academy, gradually progressing through all categories from U15 to senior. Although he trained with the first team, he mostly played for the B team.

=== Early career ===
On 13 July 2023, it was announced that Urblík would be joining Slovak club FC DAC 1904 Dunajská Streda, signing a four-year contract. After not being able to play a game for Dunajská Streda due to an injury in the ankle, he joined former club Győr on a six-month loan. He permanently returned to the club after his loan. He played in a UEFA Conference League qualifying match against Rapid Wien, coming on off the bench in the 65th minute of a 2–1 defeat. On 22 February 2026, it was announced that Urblík would be joining Slovak 2. Liga side FC ŠTK 1914 Šamorín on a loan until the end of the season. He debuted for the club in a 1–1 draw against Redfox FC Stará Ľubovňa, playing the full match.

== International career ==
Urblík received his first international call-up to the Slovakia national under-17 football team, being nominated as a back-up ahead of two friendly matches against Hungary. In 2023, he was nominated as a back-up for the Slovakia national under-21 football team for matches against the Czech Republic and Denmark.
