= Lucas Correia =

Luxembourgish footballer (born 2002)

Personal information
- Date of birth: 18 April 2002 (age 24)
- Place of birth: Luxembourg
- Height: 1.65 m (5 ft 5 in)
- Position: Winger

Team information
- Current team: Atert Bissen
- Number: 9

Youth career
- Metz

Senior career*
Years	Team	Apps	(Gls)
2019–2023	Fola Esch	67	(12)
2023–2025	Swift Hesperange	38	(8)
2025–2026	Sanjoanense	8	(0)
2026	Virton	3	(0)
2026–	Atert Bissen	8	(0)

International career
2018	Luxembourg U17	5	(0)
2019–2020	Luxembourg U19	6	(0)
2021–2024	Luxembourg U21	12	(0)
- * Club domestic league appearances and goals as of 16 September 2026

Lucas Correia (born 18 April 2002) is a Luxembourgish professional footballer who plays as a winger for Atert Bissen.

== Early life ==
Correia grew up idolizing Brazil international Lucas Moura.

== Education ==
Correia attended the University of Oregon for a month.

== Career ==
In 2019, Correia signed for Luxembourgish side CS Fola Esch, where he was regarded as one of the club's most important players. He helped the club win the league.

== Style of play ==
Correia mainly operates as a midfielder or winger and is known for his speed.

== Personal life ==
Correia is the son of football manager Miguel Correia.
