= Duncan McDowell =

Scottish football manager

Personal information
- Place of birth: Glasgow, Scotland

Managerial career
- Years: Team
- IBV
- FH
- 1972: Iceland
- IBV
- 1975: Caroline Hill
- 1978–1986: Brunei

Duncan McDowell is a Scottish former football manager.

== Career ==
McDowell's early career was spent in Scotland, where he was a coach with Morton, before becoming manager of Icelandic club IBV. McDowell then moved to FH, and also took charge of the Icelandic national team for four matches between May and July 1972. McDowell then went back to Scotland to become assistant to Eric Smith at Hamilton Academical, before returning to IBV in Iceland. McDowell later spent time in the United States and Canada, before taking charge of Hong Kong club Caroline Hill in 1975. McDowell later became the manager of the Brunei national team, a job he held for eight years. After spending time in Canada and Scotland, McDowell joined the Missionaries of Charity in London in the late 1980s.
