= Viktor Örlygur Andrason =

Icelandic footballer

Personal information
- Date of birth: 5 February 2000 (age 26)
- Place of birth: Iceland
- Height: 1.78 m (5 ft 10 in)
- Position: Midfielder

Team information
- Current team: Víkingur Reykjavík
- Number: 8

Youth career
- –2016: Víkingur Reykjavík

Senior career*
| Years | Team | Apps | (Gls) |
| 2016– | Víkingur Reykjavík | 177 | (11) |

International career^{‡}
| 2016 | Iceland U16 | 9 | (1) |
| 2016 | Iceland U17 | 3 | (0) |
| 2017 | Iceland U18 | 3 | (0) |
| 2018 | Iceland U19 | 2 | (1) |
| 2019–2022 | Iceland U21 | 10 | (1) |
| 2022– | Iceland | 4 | (0) |
- * Club domestic league appearances and goals as of 1 November 2026 ‡ National team caps and goals as of 18 March 2023

Viktor Örlygur Andrason (born 5 February 2000) is an Icelandic footballer who plays as a midfielder for Icelandic club Víkingur Reykjavík.

== Club career ==
Viktor made his senior debut with Víkingur Reykjavík in 2016, having come up through their youth sides.

== International career ==
Viktor made his debut with the Iceland national team in the friendly match against Uganda on 12 January 2022, playing the full 90 minutes.

== Honours ==
Víkingur Reykjavík

- Úrvalsdeild: 2021, Úrvalsdeild: 2025
- Icelandic Cup: 2019, 2021
