= Alex Weir (footballer, born 1879) =

Scottish footballer

Personal information
- Full name: Alexander Weir
- Date of birth: 24 February 1879
- Place of birth: Larbert, Scotland
- Position: Half-back

Senior career*
Years	Team	Apps	(Gls)
1897–1898	Heather Rangers		
1898–1899	Denny Juniors		
1899–1905	Stenhousemuir		
1905–1906	Celtic		
1906–1907	Reading		
1907–1909	Glossop	69	(0)
1909–1910	Stockport County	1	(0)
Total		70	(0)
- * Club domestic league appearances and goals

Alexander Weir (24 February 1879–unknown) was a Scottish footballer who played in the Football League for Glossop and Stockport County.
