= Fritz Buchloh =

German footballer and manager

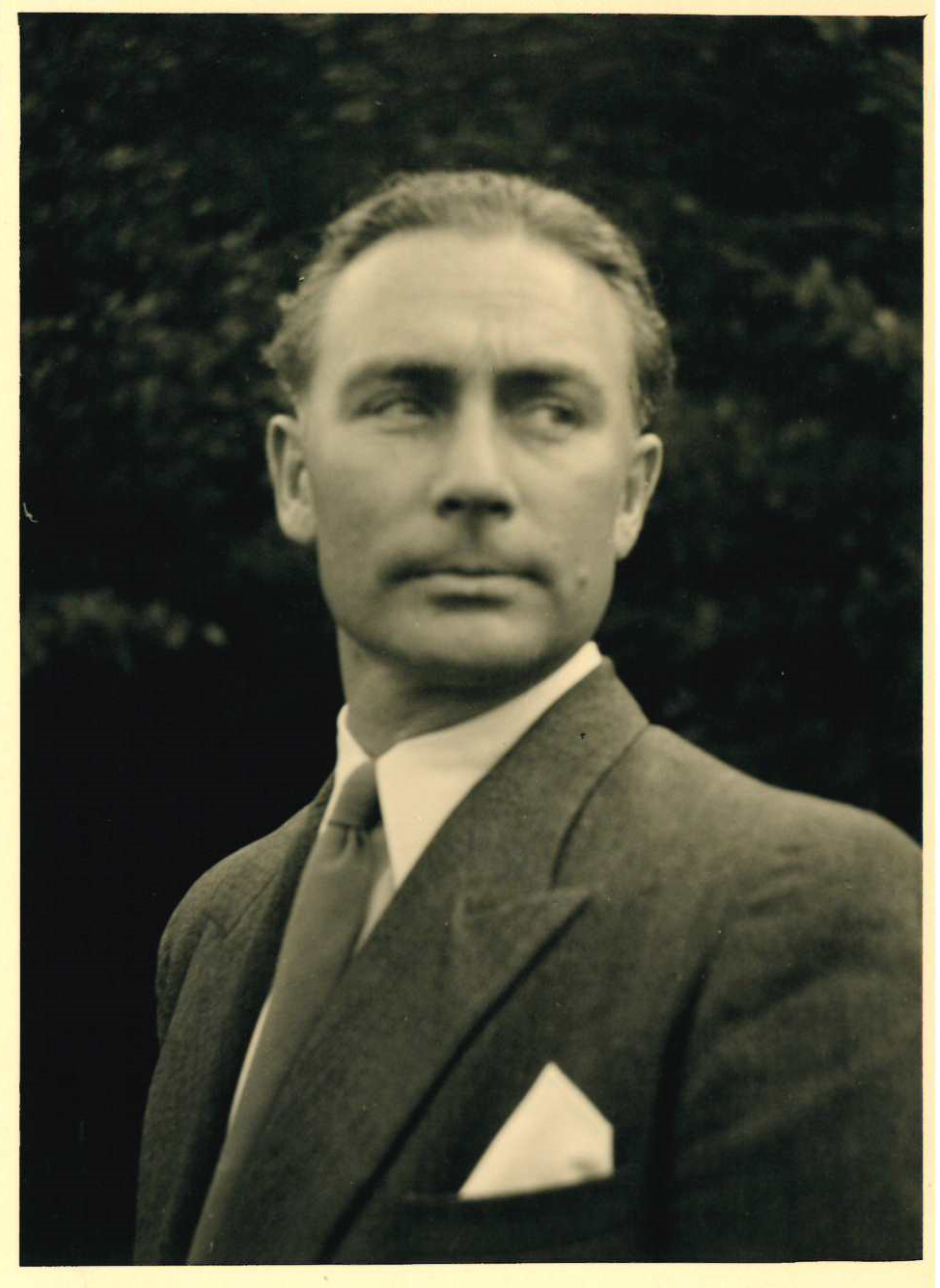

Personal information
- Full name: Friedrich Hermann Buchloh
- Date of birth: 26 November 1909
- Place of birth: Mülheim an der Ruhr, German Empire
- Date of death: 22 July 1998 (aged 88)
- Place of death: Germany
- Position: Goalkeeper

Senior career*
| Years | Team | Apps | (Gls) |
| 1933–1938 | VfB Speldorf | | |
| 1938–1939 | Hertha BSC | | |
| 1939–1945 | Schwarz-Weiß Essen | | |

International career
| 1932–1938 | Germany | 17 | (0) |

Managerial career
- 1939–1940: Víkingur
- 1949: Iceland
- 1952–1954: Schwarz-Weiß Essen
Medal record
Men's football
Representing Germany
FIFA World Cup
| Third place | 1934 Italy |
- * Club domestic league appearances and goals

Friedrich Hermann "Fritz" Buchloh (26 November 1909 – 22 July 1998) was a German football manager and footballer who played as a goalkeeper. He was born in Mülheim an der Ruhr, Germany. Buchloh was the last surviving member of Germany's 1934 World Cup squad.

== Club career ==
In the domestic league he played for VfB Speldorf.

== International career ==
He was a participant in the two World Cups, in 1934 and 1938 but didn't play a single minute in both tournaments. Buchloh won 17 caps for Germany. He was also part of Germany's squad at the 1936 Summer Olympics.

== Coaching career ==
In the year 1949 he managed the Iceland national football team.
