= Eggert Jóhannesson =

Icelandic footballer and manager

Eggert Jóhannesson was an Icelandic football manager and former player. He managed the Icelandic national team in 1972.

== Honours - Manager ==
Víkingur

- Icelandic Cup: 1971
