= Daníel Hafsteinsson =

Icelandic footballer

Personal information
- Full name: Daníel Hafsteinsson
- Date of birth: 12 November 1999 (age 27)
- Place of birth: Akureyri, Iceland
- Height: 1.85 m (6 ft 1 in)
- Position: Attacking midfielder

Team information
- Current team: Víkingur Reykjavík
- Number: 11

Youth career
- –2016: KA

Senior career*
Years	Team	Apps	(Gls)
2016	Dalvík/Reynir	3	(1)
2017–2019	KA	40	(4)
2019–2021	Helsingborgs IF	6	(0)
2020	→ FH (loan)	11	(3)
2021–2024	KA	87	(10)
2025–	Víkingur Reykjavík	45	(10)

International career^{‡}
2015	Iceland U17	3	(0)
2017	Iceland U19	5	(1)
2018–2019	Iceland U21	11	(0)
2022–	Iceland	2	(0)
- * Club domestic league appearances and goals as of 1 November 2026 ‡ National team caps and goals as of 18 March 2026

Daníel Hafsteinsson (born 12 November 1999) is an Icelandic football attacking midfielder, who plays for Víkingur Reykjavík in Úrvalsdeild karla and the Iceland national team.

== Club career ==
=== KA ===
Daníel started his career with local club KA in 2017, after having played 3 games with local feeder club Dalvík/Reynir in 2016. In 2018 he played 20 games for KA in Úrvalsdeild and was voted young player of the season by the club. After 12 games in the league with KA in 2019 he was sold to Helsingborgs IF for undisclosed fee on 17 July 2019.

=== Helsingborgs IF ===
He joined HIF 17 July 2019 and signed a 3.5 years contract. Daníel made his debut for Helsingborgs IF on 29 July in a 1–4 loss against Örebro.

=== Knattspyrnufélag Akureyrar ===
He joined KA Akureyrar on 6 February 2021.

== Career statistics ==
As of match played 22 August 2020

Season	Club	Division	League		Cup		Total	
Season	Club	Division	Apps	Goals	Apps	Goals	Apps	Goals
2016	Dalvík/Reynir	3. deild	3	1	0	0	3	1
2017	KA	Úrvalsdeild	8	0	1	0	9	0
2018	KA	Úrvalsdeild	20	3	2	0	23	3
2019	KA	Úrvalsdeild	12	1	2	1	13	2
KA total			40	4	5	1	45	5
2019	Helsingborg	Allsvenskan	6	0	1	0	7	0
2020	FH	Úrvalsdeild	11	3	2	1	13	4
2021	KA Akureyrar	Úrvalsdeild	0	0	0	0	0	0
Career total			60	8	8	2	68	10
