= Murdo McDougall =

Scottish footballer and manager

Murdo McDougall was a Scottish football manager and former player. He was joint manager of the Icelandic national team in 1946.
