= Oliver Ekroth =

Swedish footballer

Personal information
- Date of birth: 18 January 1992 (age 34)
- Place of birth: Sweden
- Height: 1.86 m (6 ft 1 in)
- Position: Defender

Team information
- Current team: Víkingur
- Number: 4

Youth career
- Rödsle BK

Senior career*
Years	Team	Apps	(Gls)
2012	Oskarshamns AIK	17	(1)
2013–2014	Sandvikens IF	46	(6)
2015–2016	Västerås SK	47	(2)
2017	Kristianstad FC	22	(1)
2018–2021	Degerfors IF	106	(9)
2022–	Víkingur	117	(4)
- * Club domestic league appearances and goals as of 1 November 2026

Oliver Ekroth (born 18 January 1992) is a Swedish football defender who plays for Icelandic club Víkingur.

== Club career ==
On 25 February 2022, Ekroth signed with Víkingur in Iceland.
