= 1924 in Iceland =

- Decades: 1900s; 1910s; 1920s; 1930s; 1940s
- See also: Other events in 1924 · Timeline of Icelandic history

The following lists events that happened in 1924 in Iceland.

== Incumbents ==
- Monarch – Kristján X
- Prime Minister – Sigurður Eggerz, Jón Magnússon

== Events ==
- 22 March – Third cabinet of Jón Magnússon formed
- 1924 Úrvalsdeild

== Births ==
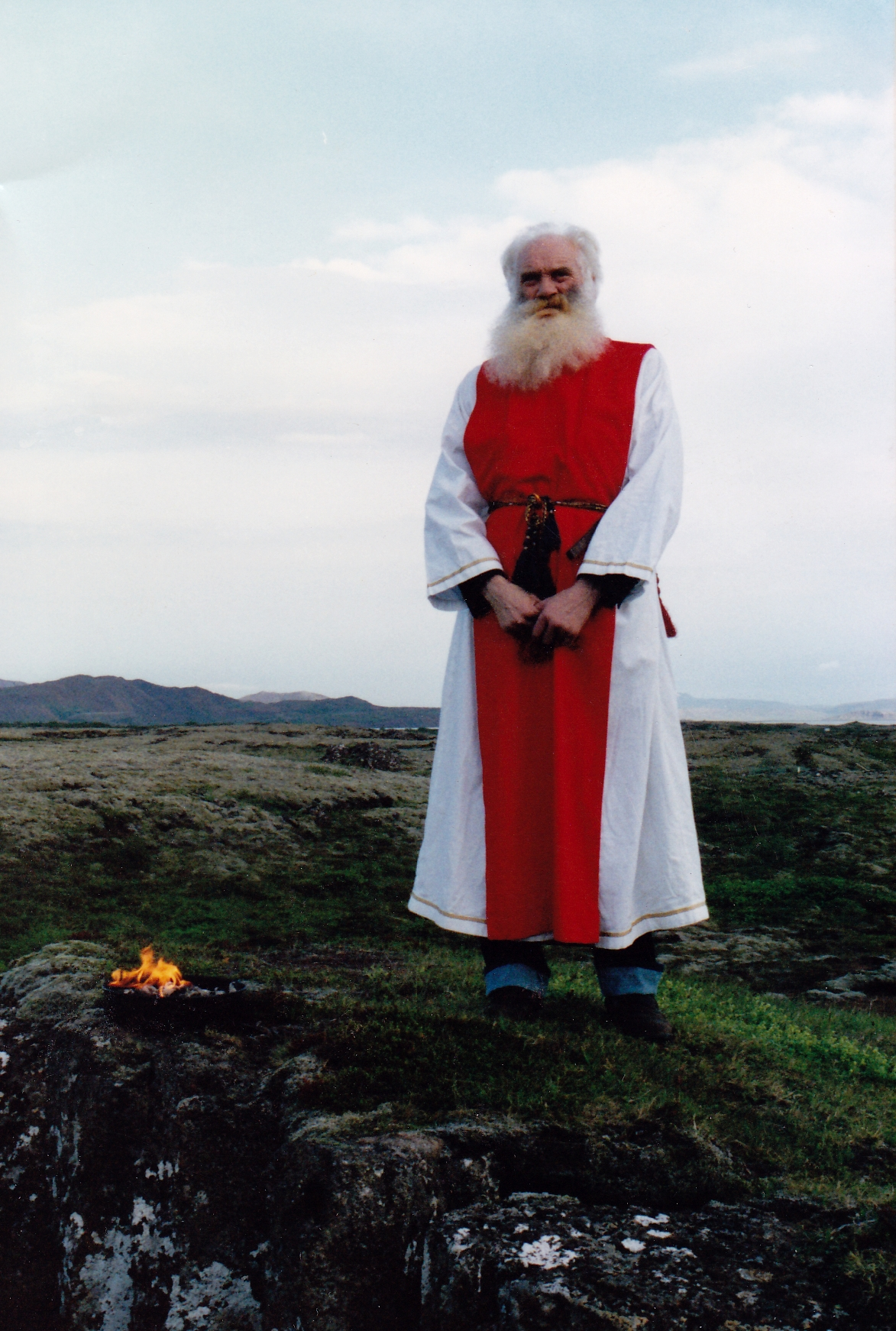
Sveinbjörn Beinteinsson

- 28 January – Karl Guðmundsson, footballer (d. 2012)
- 10 April – Jónas Kristjánsson, scholar and novelist (d. 2014)
- 25 May – Finnbjörn Þorvaldsson, sprinter. (d. 2018)
- 4 July – Sveinbjörn Beinteinsson (d. 1993)
- 7 July – Benedikt Sigurðsson Gröndal, politician (d. 2010)
- 14 July – Matthías Kristjánsson, cross country skier (d. 1998).
- 14 November – Sveinn Helgason, footballer

== Deaths ==
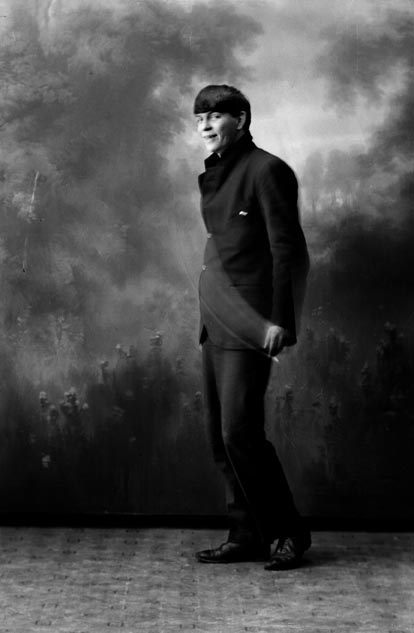
Muggur

- 31 December – Jón Thoroddsen junior, writer (b. 1898)
- 26 July – Muggur, or Guðmundur Pétursson Thorsteinsson, artist and film actor (b. 1891)
