= 1916 in Iceland =

- Decades: 1890s; 1900s; 1910s; 1920s; 1930s
- See also: Other events in 1916 · Timeline of Icelandic history

The following lists events that happened in 1916 in Iceland.

== Incumbents ==
- Monarch – Christian X
- Minister – Einar Arnórsson

== Events ==
- 5 August – Icelandic parliamentary election, August 1916
- 21 October – Icelandic parliamentary election, October 1916
- 21 October – Icelandic community service referendum, 1916
- 1916 Úrvalsdeild

== Births ==
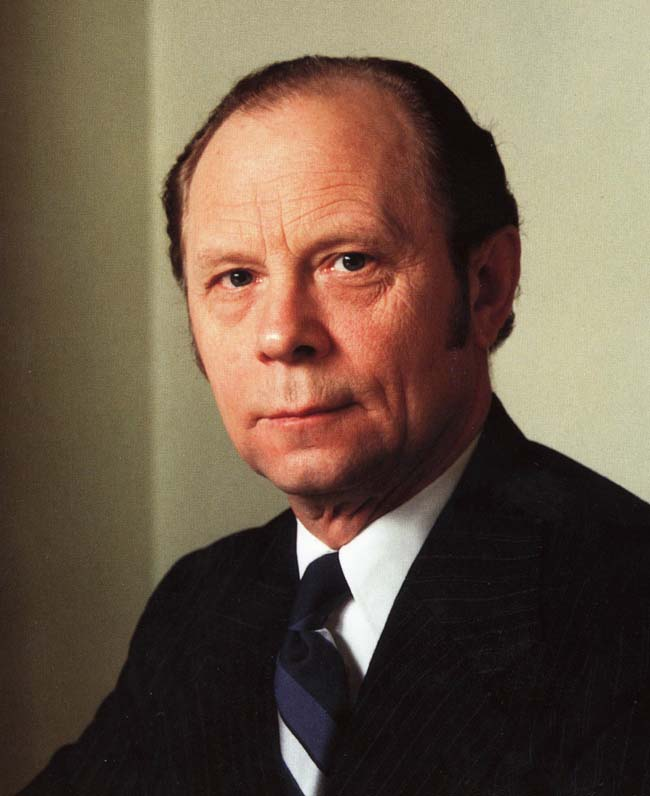
Kristján Eldjárn

- 6 December – Kristján Eldjárn, politician (d. 1982)
- 7 December – Sigurður Ólafsson, footballer (d. 1993)
- 21 December – Brandur Brynjólfsson, footballer (d. 1999)

== Deaths ==
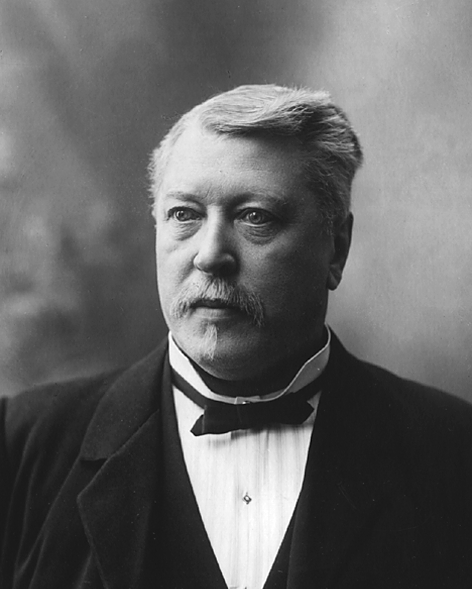
Jón Ólafsson

- 11 July – Jón Ólafsson, editor, journalist, and poet (b. 1850)
- 15 December – Þórhallur Bjarnarson, the sixth Bishop of Iceland, served in office since 1908 (b. 1855)
