= Kristjánsson =

Kristjánsson is an Icelandic patronymic, meaning son of Kristján. In Icelandic names, the name is not strictly a surname as it is not a family name, but a patronymic. Notable people with the name include:

- Albert Kristjansson (1877–1974), Canadian politician from Manitoba; provincial legislator 1920–1922
- Aron Kristjánsson (born 1972), Icelandic handball player and coach
- Ársæll Kristjánsson (born 1958), Icelandic footballer
- Axel Kristjánsson (1892–1942), Icelandic athlete and merchant
- Benedikt Kristjánsson (born 1987), Icelandic tenor
- Björn Kristjánsson, known as Borko, Icelandic musician
- Broddi Kristjánsson (born 1960), Icelandic Olympic badminton player
- Einar Kristjánsson (1934–1996), Icelandic alpine skier
- Guðjón Arnar Kristjánsson (1944–2018), Icelandic politician; member of the Alþing since 1999
- Guðmundur Kristjánsson (born 1989), Icelandic football player
- Guðmundur Kristjánsson (golfer) (born 1992), Icelandic professional golfer and European Tour player
- Hrafn Kristjánsson (born 1972), Icelandic basketball player and coach
- Jón Kristjánsson (1920–1996), Icelandic Olympic cross-country skier
- Jónas Kristjánsson (1924–2014), Icelandic scholar and novelist
- Jónas Kristjánsson (newspaper editor) (1940–2018), Icelandic writer, newspaper journalist and editor
- Kári Kristjánsson (born 1984), Icelandic handball player
- Kristján Kristjánsson, also known as KK (born 1956), Icelandic blues and folk musician
- Kristján Örn Kristjánsson (born 1997), Icelandic handball player
- Logi Jes Kristjánsson (born 1972), Icelandic backstroke swimmer
- Lúðvík Kristjánsson (1887–1958), Icelandic-Canadian poet
- Matthías Kristjánsson (1924–1998), Icelandic Olympic cross-country skier
- Mímir Kristjánsson (born 1986), Norwegian politician
- Ólafur Kristjánsson (born 1968), Icelandic football player and manager
- Sigurður Kári Kristjánsson (born 1973), Icelandic politician; member of the Alþing since 2003
- Snorri Hergill Kristjánsson (born 1974), Icelandic author
- Stefán Kristjánsson (1982–2018), Icelandic chess grandmaster
- Stefán Kristjánsson (alpine skier) (1924–1990), Icelandic alpine skier
- Þórarinn Kristjánsson (born 1980), Icelandic football player
- Þorvaldur Davíð Kristjánsson (born 1983), Icelandic actor
- Tómas Kristjánsson (born 2008), Icelandic professional footballer
- Viggó Kristjánsson (born 1993), Icelandic handball player
- Víkingur Kristjánsson (born 1972), Icelandic actor and screenwriter
