= Gunnar Thorsteinsson =

Icelandic football player

Personal information
- Full name: Gunnar Pétursson Thorsteinsson
- Date of birth: 26 June 1894
- Date of death: 5 March 1921 (aged 26)
- Place of death: Søllerød, Denmark
- Position: Midfielder

Senior career*
Years	Team	Apps	(Gls)
1914–19??	Fram		
- * Club domestic league appearances and goals

Gunnar Pétursson Thorsteinsson (26 June 1894 – 5 March 1921) was an Icelandic footballer. He is considered one of Iceland's first great footballers.

== Early life and family ==
Gunnar was the son of the entrepreneur Pétur J. Thorsteinsson and Ásthildur Guðmundsdóttir. He grew up in Copenhagen and Reykjavík. Among Gunnar's siblings were footballers Friðþjófur Thorsteinsson and Samúel Thorsteinsson and artist Guðmundur "Muggur" Thorsteinsson.

Gunnar joined Fram in 1913, quickly becoming one of their best players. He was the Icelandic tournaments top goal scorer during the 1917 season.

== Death ==
In the fall of 1919, Gunnar fell ill with pulmonary tuberculosis. He died in May 1921 in Søllerød, Denmark, from the illness. At the time of his death, he was engaged to Nína Sæmundsdóttir.

== Honours, trophies and achievements ==
=== Titles ===
- Icelandic Championships (3):
  - 1913, 1914, 1918

=== Individual ===
- Icelandic tournament top goal scorer:
  - 1917
