= 1925 in Iceland =

- Decades: 1900s; 1910s; 1920s; 1930s; 1940s
- See also: Other events in 1925 · Timeline of Icelandic history

The following lists events that happened in 1925 in Iceland.

== Incumbents ==
- Monarch - Kristján X
- Prime Minister – Jón Magnússon

== Events ==
- 1925 Úrvalsdeild

== Births ==
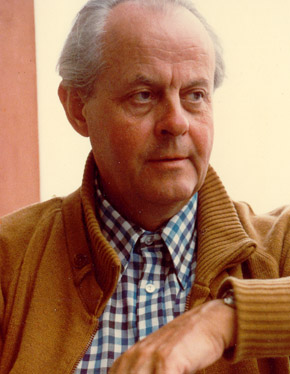
Einar Pálsson

- 26 May – Ragnar Sigtryggsson, footballer (d. 2009)
- 6 July – Eggert Gíslason Þorsteinsson, politician (d. 1995)
- 19 July – Óskar Jónsson, middle-distance runner, Olympian.
- 12 August – Thor Vilhjálmsson, writer (d. 2011)
- 16 December – Geir Hallgrímsson, politician (d. 1990)

=== Full date missing ===
- Einar Pálsson, writer (d. 1996)

== Deaths ==
=== Full date missing ===
- Helgi Jónsson, botanist and phycologist (b. 1867)
