= 1922 in Iceland =

- Decades: 1900s; 1910s; 1920s; 1930s; 1940s
- See also: Other events in 1922 · Timeline of Icelandic history

The following lists events that happened in 1922 in Iceland.

== Incumbents ==
- Monarch – Kristján X
- Prime Minister – Jón Magnússon, Sigurður Eggerz

== Events ==
- 8 July – Icelandic parliamentary election, 1922
- 1922 Úrvalsdeild

== Births ==
- 26 January – Kristján Karlsson, poet (d. 2014)
- 19 February – Sigfús Sigurðsson, athlete (d. 1999)
- 3 September – Björn Th. Björnsson, writer (d. 2007)
- 23 September – Einar Ágústsson, politician (d. 1986).
- 30 September – Magnús Helgi Magnússon, politician (d. 2006).
- 6 October – Alexander Stefánsson, politician (d. 2008)

=== Full date missing ===
- Hannes Sigfússon, poet (d. 1997)

== Deaths ==
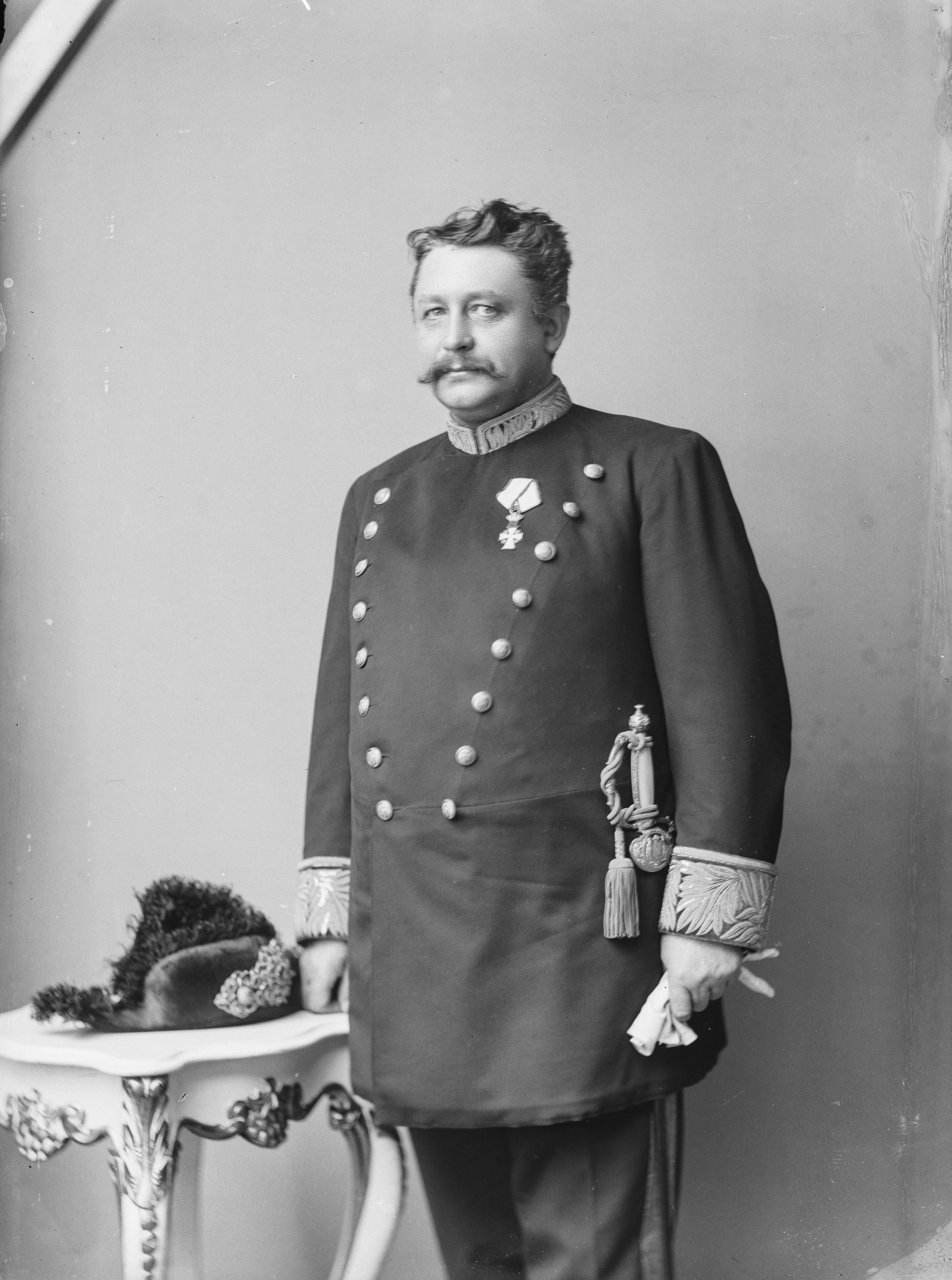
Hannes Hafstein

- 13 December – Hannes Hafstein, politician (b. 1861)
