= 1919 in Iceland =

- Decades: 1890s; 1900s; 1910s; 1920s; 1930s
- See also: Other events in 1919 · Timeline of Icelandic history

The following lists events that happened in 1919 in Iceland.

== Incumbents ==
- Monarch - Kristján X
- Prime Minister – Jón Magnússon

== Events ==
- 15 November – Icelandic parliamentary election, 1919
- 1919 Úrvalsdeild

== Births ==
- 25 February – Magnús Kjartansson, journalist, writer and politician (d. 1981).
- 2 June – Pétur Sigurgeirsson, bishop (d. 2010)
- 21 November – Helgi Hóseasson, carpenter, atheist and socialist (d. 2009)

== Deaths ==
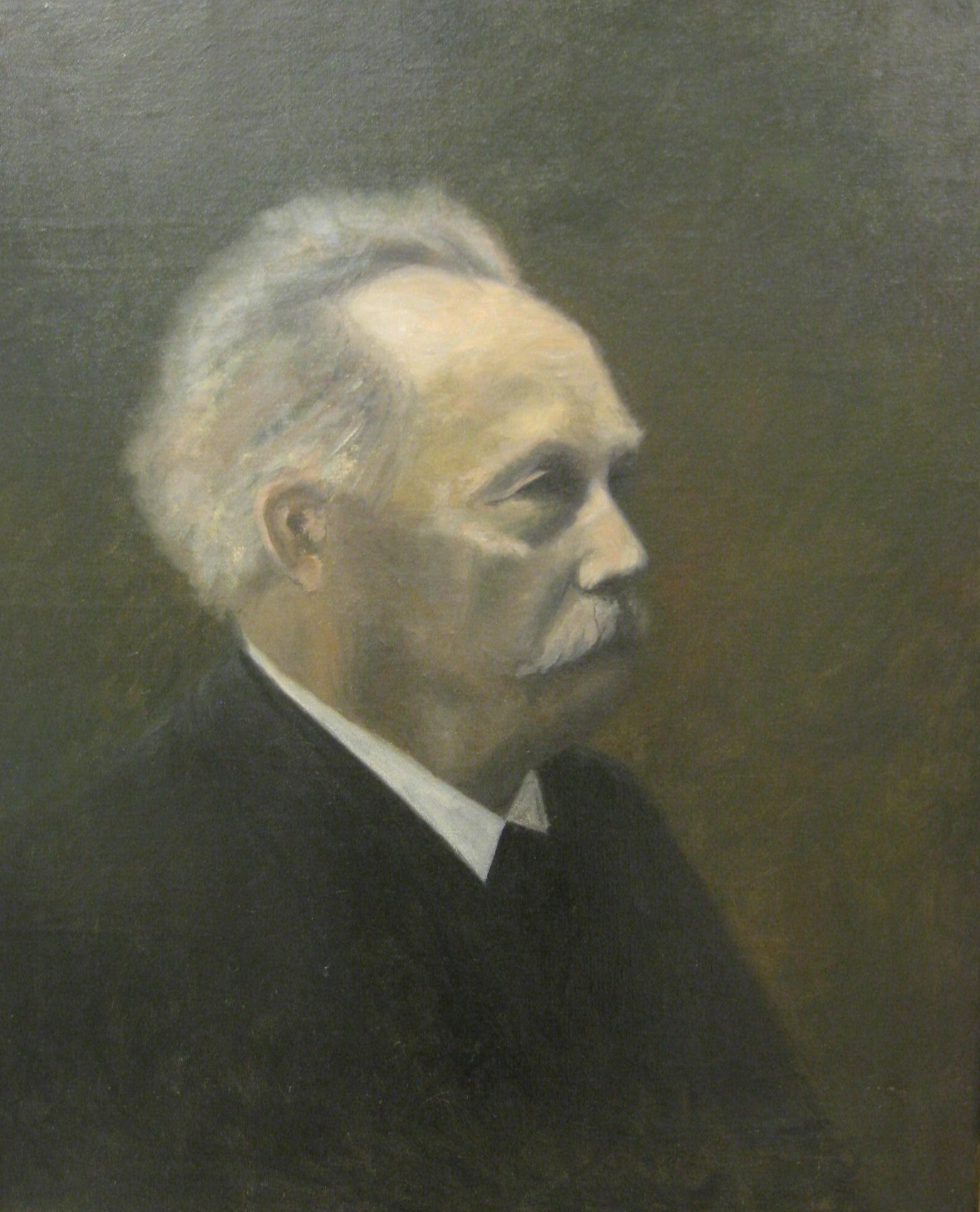
Björn M. Ólsen

- 16 January – Björn M. Ólsen, scholar and politician (b. 1850).
