= Friðþjófur Thorsteinsson =

Icelandic football player and coach

Personal information
- Full name: Friðþjófur Thorsteinsson Pétursson
- Date of birth: 28 August 1895
- Place of birth: Bíldudalur, Iceland
- Date of death: 13 April 1967 (aged 71)
- Position: Forward

Senior career*
Years	Team	Apps	(Gls)
1911–1914	Fram		
1914–1918	Hibernian FC (amateur)		
1918–1921	Fram		
192?–19??	St. Andrews FC		
1934–193?	Fram		

Managerial career
- 1934–1936: Fram
- 1940: Fram
- * Club domestic league appearances and goals

Friðþjófur Thorsteinsson Pétursson (28 August 1895 – 13 April 1967) was an Icelandic footballer, coach and former chairman of Fram. He is considered one of Iceland's first great footballers.

== Early life and family ==
Friðþjófur was the son of the entrepreneur Pétur J. Thorsteinsson and Ásthildur Guðmundsdóttir. He was born in Bíldudalur, Iceland, and later grew up in Copenhagen and Reykjavík. Among Friðþjófur's siblings were Gunnar Thorsteinsson, who for a time was the chairman of Fram and Samúel Thorsteinsson, one of the leading footballers that Iceland has produced and later a member of the Denmark men's national football team. They were all brothers of the artist Guðmundur "Muggur" Thorsteinsson.

== Football career ==
Friðþjófur started participating in football while attending school in Denmark.

After returning to Iceland he joined Knattspyrnufélagið Fram where he immediately established himself as one of the country's best players. He scored both goals for Fram in a famous victory over Fótboltafélag Reykjavíkur at the UMFÍ national tournament at Melavellir on 17 June 1911, a match considered the first official football match in Iceland.

Friðþjófur studied commerce in Edinburgh, Scotland in 1914 and stayed abroad for four years. During that time, he played football with the amateur team of the Scottish Hibernian FC.

In the summer of 1918, Friðþjófur returned to Fram. In the three games that season, he scored 12 of Fram's 14 goals, including six against Knattspyrnufélag Reykjavíkur. The following year he repeated the feat and scored six goals in a 9–0 win against Valur.

Friðþjófur was a key member of the Icelandic select team that competed against Akademisk Boldklub in the first visit of a foreign football team to Iceland in the summer of 1919. He scored two of the four goals of the Icelanders victory in the first game between them.

In 1922, Friðþjófur moved to Canada and lived there for 12 years, where he, among other things, played and coached football, including for St. Andrews FC.

In 1934, Fram was in coaching trouble and the idea arose to see if Friðþjófur would be willing to return home and coach the team. He accepted and coached the team from 1934 to 1936, while also playing a few matches, and again in 1940. He also coached the Icelandic selection team that toured Germany in the summer of 1935. There he played his last official match at the age of 40. The Fram team improved greatly under his direction, as he introduced Icelanders to various innovations in football, including the short play.

Friðþjófur was the chairman of Fram from 1919 and 1920 and again in 1935. On Fram's 30th anniversary in 1938, he was named an honorary member.

== Honours, trophies and achievements ==
=== Titles ===
- Icelandic Championships (4):
  - 1913, 1914, 1918, 1921

=== Individual ===
- Icelandic tournament top goal scorer:
  - 1918, 1919
