= 1918 in Iceland =

- Decades: 1890s; 1900s; 1910s; 1920s; 1930s
- See also: Other events in 1918 · Timeline of Icelandic history

The following lists events that happened in 1918 in Iceland.

== Incumbents ==
- Monarch – Kristján X
- Prime Minister – Jón Magnússon

== Events ==
- 19 October – Icelandic sovereignty referendum, 1918
- 1 December – Danish–Icelandic Act of Union
- 1918 Úrvalsdeild

== Births ==
- 26 September – Ólafur Jóhann Sigurðsson, novelist, short story writer and poet (d. 1988)
- 18 November – Óli B. Jónsson, football player and manager (d. 2005)

== Deaths ==
Torfhildur Þorsteinsdóttir

- 14 November – Torfhildur Þorsteinsdóttir, writer (b. 1845).
