= Muggur =

Icelandic painter

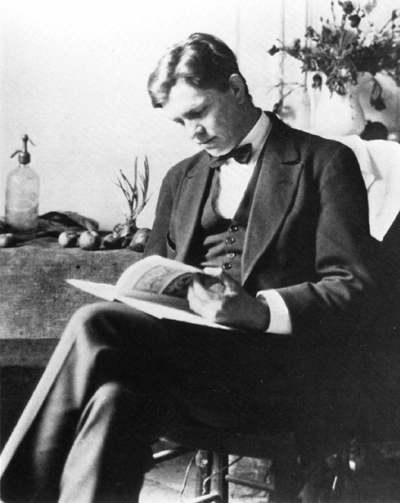
- Muggur in 1924
- Born: Guðmundur Pétursson Thorsteinsson; 5 September 1891; Bíldudalur, Iceland
- Died: 27 July 1924 (aged 32); Søllerød, Denmark
- Education: Royal Danish Academy of Fine Arts
- Occupations: Painter, graphic artist, author and film actor
- Spouse: Inger Naur (divorced)
- Parents: Pétur J. Thorsteinsson (father); Ásthildur Guðmundsdóttir (mother)
- Relatives: Friðþjófur Thorsteinsson (brother); Gunnar Thorsteinsson (brother); Samuel Thorsteinsson (brother)

Guðmundur Pétursson Thorsteinsson (5 September 1891, Bíldudalur – 27 July 1924, Søllerød), better known as Muggur, was an Icelandic painter, graphic artist, author and film actor.

== Biography ==
Muggur was born in Bíldudalur, Iceland. His father, Pétur, was one of the richest men in Iceland and later one of the founders of the fishing company Milljónarfélagið. When he was twelve, the family moved to Copenhagen, but they travelled continuously between there and Iceland. His younger brothers, Samúel, Gunnar and Friðþjófur all became well known football players in Iceland and Denmark.

He studied at the Royal Danish Academy of Fine Arts from 1911 to 1915, but also took study trips to Germany and Italy. In 1915, he made a visit to the United States, where his works had recently been exhibited to good reviews in the Evening Sun.

In addition to his paintings, he wrote and illustrated a children's book, The Story of Dimmalimm, about a young girl and an enchanted swan. It was written in 1921 for a niece, while he was on board a cargo ship sailing from Italy to Iceland, and was published in 1942. Later, Jóhannes úr Kötlum turned it into a verse play and it was also staged as a ballet, with music by Atli Heimir Sveinsson. He created numerous drawings inspired by the Eddas as well and created Iceland's first unique deck of playing cards.

He was also a talented amateur actor and had a major role in one of Iceland's first films, Sons of the Soil (Saga Borgarættarinnar), based on a novel by Gunnar Gunnarsson.

A brief marriage to Inger Naur that ended in divorce led him to drink heavily. In 1923, already in deteriorating health, he was kicked in the back by a horse. After a lengthy stay at a spa in France, he returned to the family estate in Denmark and died of tuberculosis, aged only thirty-two. Most of his works are in the National Gallery of Iceland.

== Selected works ==
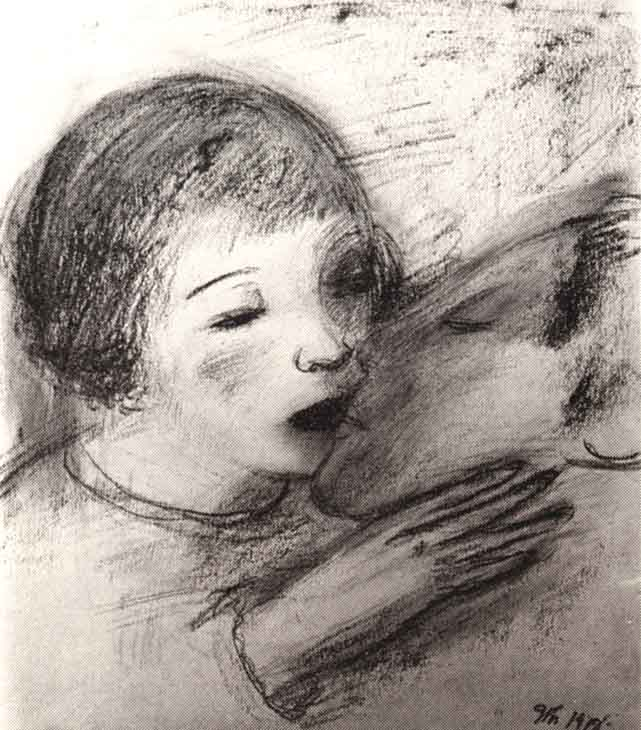
The Kiss, 1918

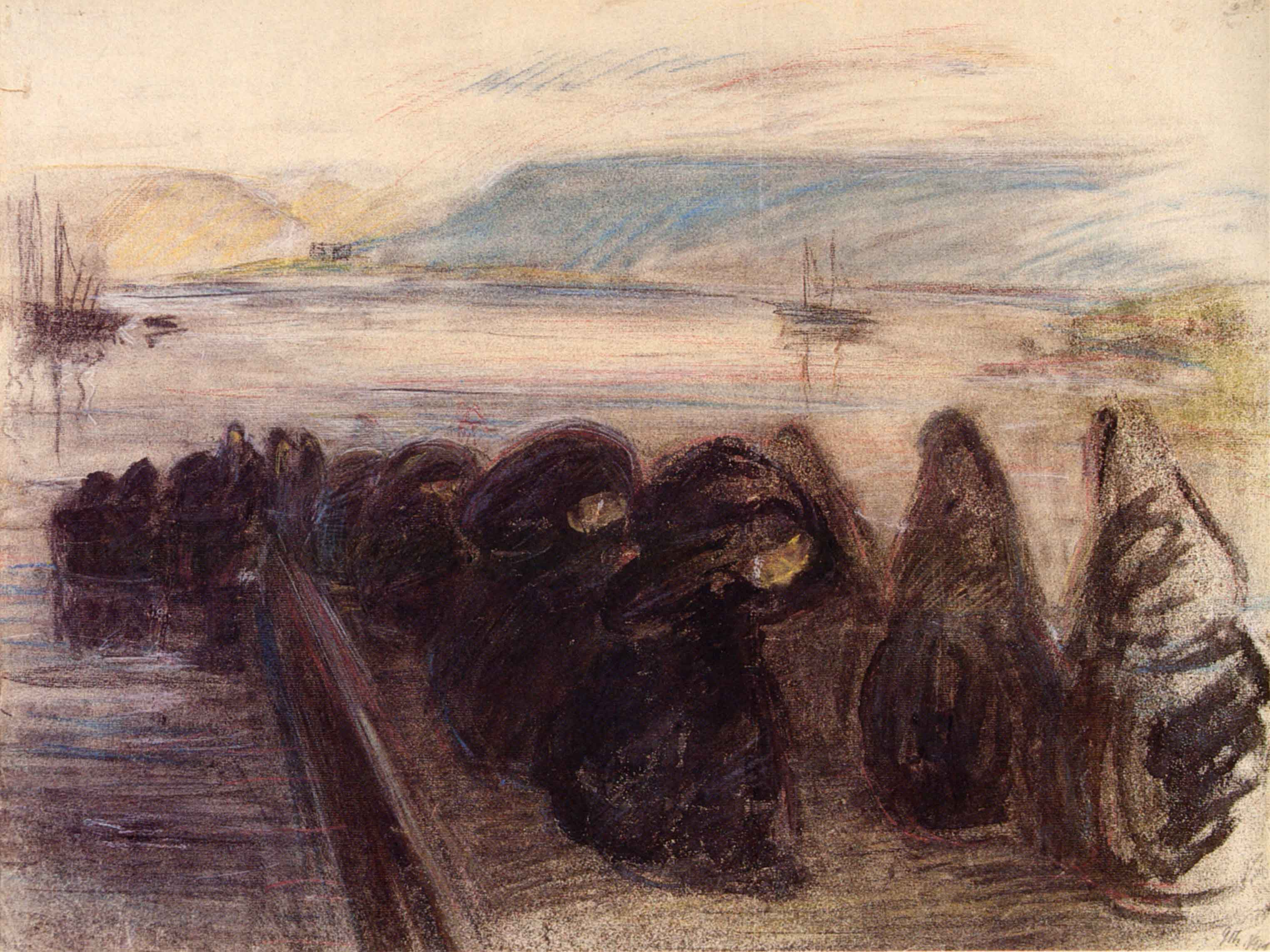
Carrying Coal, 1919

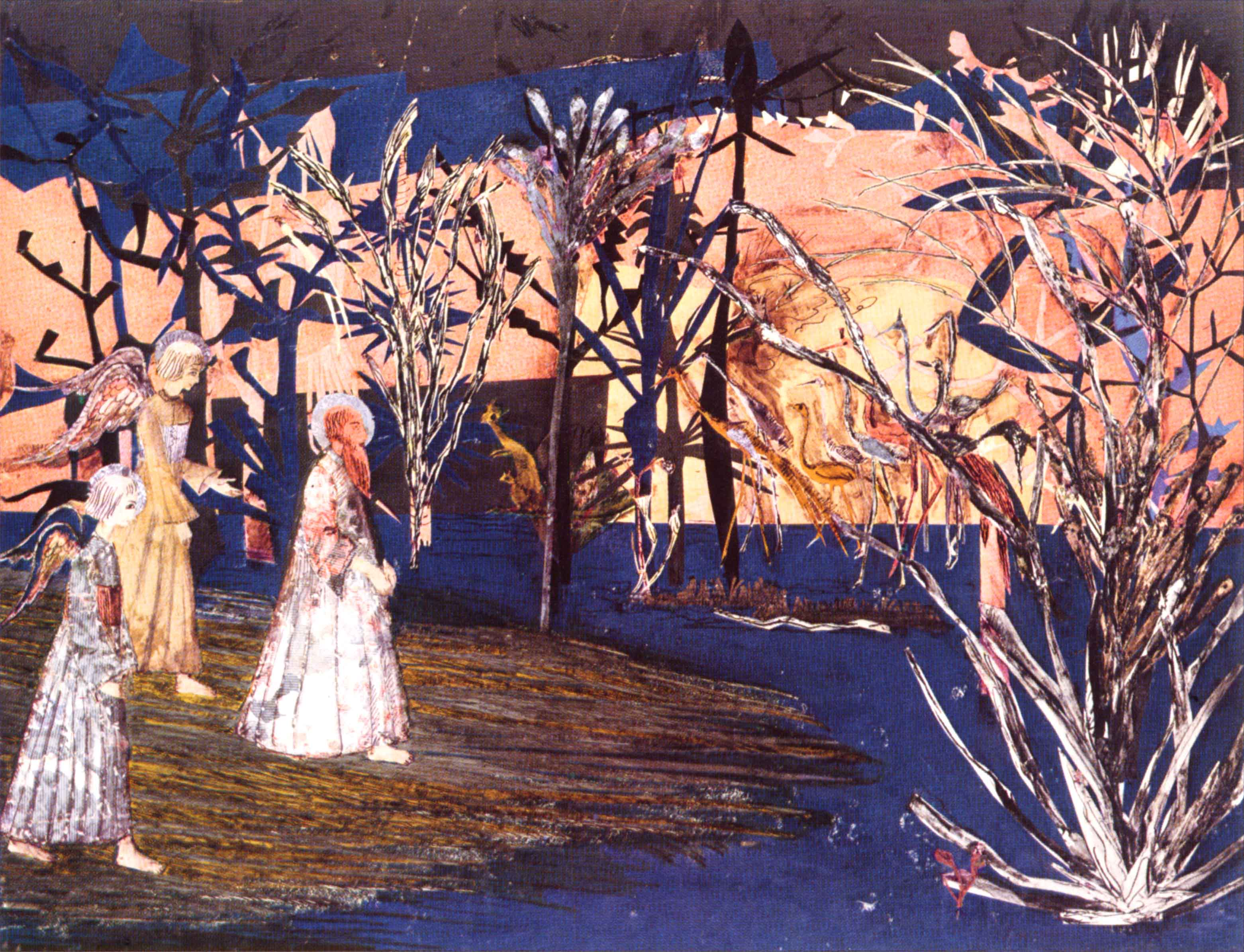
Seventh Day in Paradise, 1920

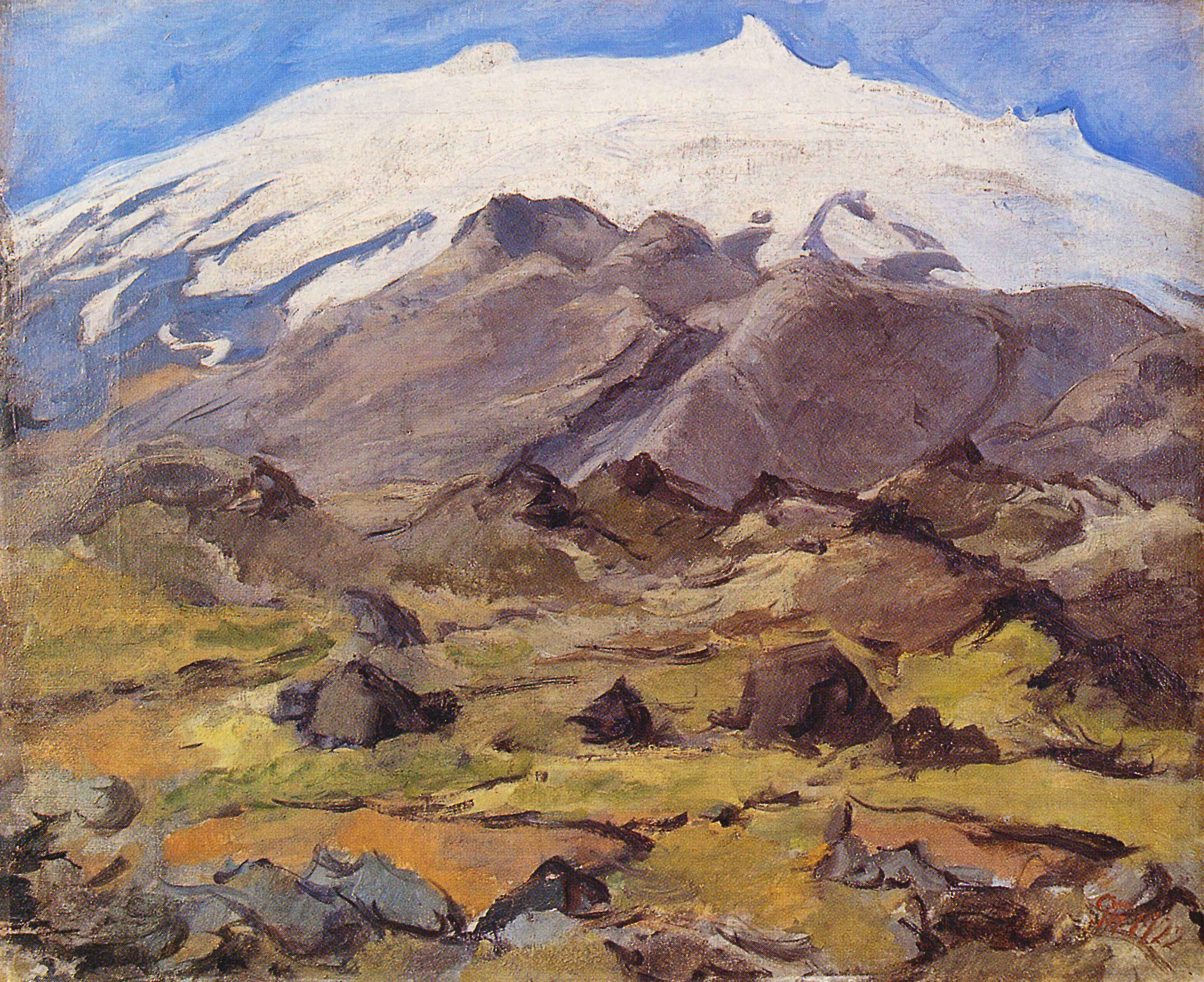
Snæfellsjökull, 1922
