= Samuel Thorsteinsson =

Danish footballer (1893–1956)

Personal information
- Full name: Samúel Pétursson Thorsteinsson
- Date of birth: 1 January 1893
- Place of birth: Bíldudalur, Iceland
- Date of death: 25 November 1956 (aged 63)
- Place of death: Slagelse, Denmark
- Position: Outside forward

Senior career*
Years	Team	Apps	(Gls)
1910	Naples FC		
191?–1912	Akademisk Boldklub		
1912–1913	Naples FC		
191?–192?	Akademisk Boldklub		

International career
1918–1919	Denmark	7	(1)
- * Club domestic league appearances and goals

Samúel Pétursson Thorsteinsson (1 January 1893 – 25 November 1956) was an Icelandic footballer and a physician. He played in seven matches for the Denmark national team in 1918 and 1919.

Playing the right outside forward position, he won the Danish football Championship in 1919 and 1921 as part of Akademisk Boldklub. He also played briefly for the Italian Naples Foot-Ball & Cricket Club, becoming the first Nordic footballer to compete in Italy.

== Family ==
Thorsteinsson was born in Bíldudalur, Iceland, to Icelandic entrepreneur Pétur J. Thorsteinsson and Ásthildur Guðmundsdóttir. He was a younger brother of Icelandic artist Muggur and older brother of footballers Gunnar Thorsteinsson and Friðþjófur Thorsteinsson.
