= Kristján =

Kristján [ˈkʰrɪstjauːn] is an Icelandic masculine given name.

The Icelandic surname Kristjánsson is a patronymic surname meaning son of Kristján. Kristjánsdóttir is a patronymic surname meaning daughter of Kristján.

Notable people Kristján with the name include:

- Kristján Andrésson (born 1981), Icelandic handball player
- Kristján Arason (born 1961), Icelandic handball player
- Kristján Eldjárn (1916–1982), third President of Iceland
- Kristján Emilsson (born 1993), Icelandic footballer
- Kristján Einar (born 1989), Icelandic racing driver
- Kristján Finnbogason (born 1971), Icelandic football goalkeeper
- Kristján Guðmundsson (born 1941), Icelandic conceptual artist
- Kristján Helgason (born 1974), Icelandic snooker player
- Kristján Jóhannsson (born 1948), Icelandic operatic tenor
- Kristján B. Jónasson, Icelandic book publisher
- Kristján Jónsson (politician) (1852–1926), Minister for Iceland
- Kristján Þór Júlíusson (born 1957), Icelandic politician
- Kristján Karlsson (1922–2014), Icelandic poet
- Kristján L. Möller (born 1953), Icelandic politician
- Kristján Örn Sigurðsson (born 1980), Icelandic footballer
- Kristján Þórður Snæbjarnarson (born 1980), Icelandic politician
