= Sigtryggsson =

Sigtryggsson is a surname. Notable people with the surname include:

- Ánláf Sigtryggsson, 10th-century Norse-Gael who was King of Northumbria and Dublin
- Guðrøðr Sigtryggsson (died 951), King of Dublin
- Harald Sigtryggsson (died 940), Viking leader who ruled Limerick
- Olaf Sigtryggsson, son of Sigtrygg Silkbeard, the Hiberno-Norse King of Dublin
- Ragnar Sigtryggsson (1925–2009), Icelandic footballer
- Rúnar Sigtryggsson (born 1972), Icelandic Olympic handball player
