= 1917 in Iceland =

- Decades: 1890s; 1900s; 1910s; 1920s; 1930s
- See also: Other events in 1917 · Timeline of Icelandic history

The following lists events that happened in 1917 in Iceland.

== Incumbents ==
- Monarch – Christian X
- Prime Minister – Jón Magnússon (from 4 January)

== Events ==
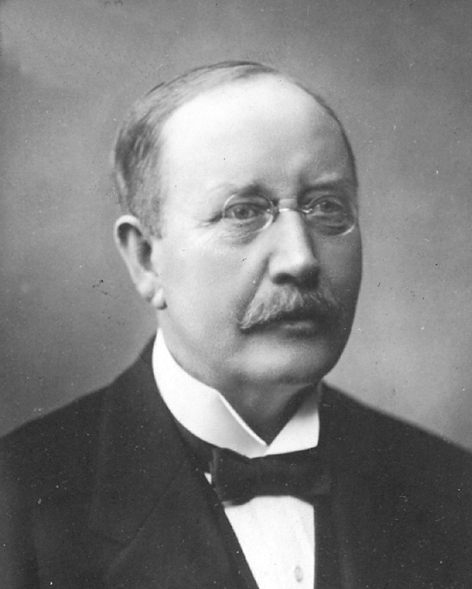
Jón Magnússon, new prime minister

- 4 January – First cabinet of Jón Magnússon
- 1917 Úrvalsdeild
- Jón Helgason became the seventh Bishop of Iceland, following the death of Þórhallur Bjarnarson the previous year.

== Births ==
- 21 January – Jón úr Vör, poet (d. 2000).
- 20 February – Louisa Matthíasdóttir, painter (d. 2000)
- 20 May – Bergur Sigurbjörnsson, magazine editor and politician (d. 2005).
- 17 December – Ellert Sölvason, football player (d. 2002).

== Deaths ==
- Rögnvaldur Ólafsson, architect (b. 1874).
