= 1921 in Iceland =

- Decades: 1900s; 1910s; 1920s; 1930s; 1940s
- See also: Other events in 1921 · Timeline of Icelandic history

The following lists events that happened in 1921 in Iceland.

== Incumbents ==
- Monarch - Kristján X
- Prime Minister – Jón Magnússon

== Events ==
- 1921 Úrvalsdeild

== Births ==
- 1 January – Ottó Jónsson, footballer
- 16 March – Þórhallur Einarsson, footballer
- 7 April – Einar Bragi poet and publisher (d. 2005)
- 26 May – Hermann Pálsson, scholar and translator (d. 2002)
- 18 July – Jón Óskar, poet (d. 1998)
- 15 August – Matthías Bjarnason, politician (d. 2014).

== Deaths ==
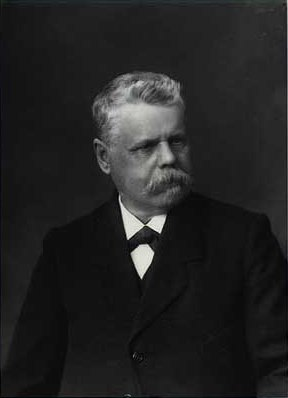
Þorvaldur Thoroddsen

- 28 September – Þorvaldur Thoroddsen, geologist and geographer (b. 1855)
