= 1915 in Iceland =

- Decades: 1890s; 1900s; 1910s; 1920s; 1930s
- See also: Other events in 1915 · Timeline of Icelandic history

The following lists events that happened in 1915 in Iceland.

== Incumbents ==
- Monarch: Christian X
- Danish Minister for Iceland – Sigurður Eggerz (until 4 May); Einar Arnórsson (from 4 May)

== Events ==
- The sports club Þór Akureyri established
- The sports club Magni Grenivík established
- 1915 Úrvalsdeild

== Births ==
- 5 January – Haukur Óskarsson, footballer (d. 1989).
- 19 September – Jóhann Hafstein, politician (d. 1980).

== Deaths ==
- 23 June – Þorgils gjallandi, writer (b. 1851)
