= Heiðar =

Heiðar is a male Icelandic given name. Notable people with the name include:

- Haukur Heiðar Hauksson (born 1991), Icelandic football right back
- Heiðar Helguson (born 1977), Icelandic footballer
- Heiðar Geir Júlíusson (born 1987), football midfielder from Akureyri on Iceland who currently plays for Swedish Division 2 club IFK Uddevalla
- Gunnar Heiðar Þorvaldsson, commonly anglicised as Gunnar Heidar Thorvaldsson (born 1982), Icelandic footballer

== See also ==
- Heiðr
