= 1923 in Iceland =

- Decades: 1900s; 1910s; 1920s; 1930s; 1940s
- See also: Other events in 1923 · Timeline of Icelandic history

The following lists events that happened in 1923 in Iceland.

== Incumbents ==
- Monarch – Kristján X
- Prime Minister – Sigurður Eggerz

== Events ==
- 27 October – Icelandic parliamentary election, 1923
- 1923 Úrvalsdeild

== Births ==
- 5 February – Friðjón Þórðarson, politician (d. 2009).
- 25 February – Jón Örn Jónasson, footballer
- 26 March – Hörður Óskarsson, footballer
- 10 April – Gunnlaugur Lárusson, footballer
- 5 May – Magnús Torfi Ólafsson, politician (d. 1998)
- 2 June – Einar Halldórsson, footballer
- 3 June – Pálmi Jónsson, businessman (d. 1991)
- 29 June – Guðmundur Kjærnested, military officer (d. 2005)
- 21 July – Tómas Árnason, politician (d. 2014).
- 1 October – Hafsteinn Guðmundsson, footballer
- 5 October – Albert Guðmundsson, footballer (d. 1994)
- 4 November – Gunnar Huseby, track and field athlete (d. 1995)
- 24 November – Halldóra Eldjárn, First Lady of Iceland (d. 2008)
