= Milljónarfélagið =

Icelandic fishing company

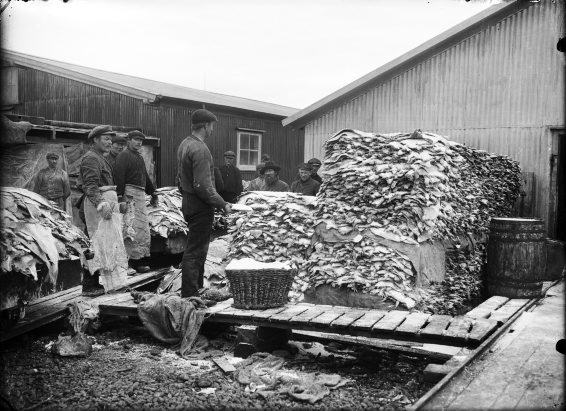
Saltfiskverkun, 1912

Milljónarfélagið was a fishing company, officially named P.J. Thorsteinsson & Co., which was based on the island of Viðey and ran from 1907 to 1914. Viðey was chosen as the main centre for the company because the nearby Reykjavík at the time lacked a harbour, water supply, and electricity.

The company was named Milljónarfélagið ('million-company') because the share value of the company was a million krónur, which was the same as the state income of Iceland in the year of the company's foundation. The key figures in its foundation were Pétur J. Thorsteinsson of Bíldudalur and Thor Jensen of Reykjavík, along with Danish investors. The company established two docks for seagoing ships in Viðey; a fish-processing factory which was linked to the docks by rail; and stores for coal and salt.
