= Ásgeir Elíasson =

Icelandic footballer and manager

Personal information
- Full name: Ásgeir Elíasson
- Date of birth: 22 November 1949
- Place of birth: Reykjavík, Iceland
- Date of death: 9 September 2007 (aged 57)
- Place of death: Reykjavík, Iceland
- Position: Midfielder

Senior career*
Years	Team	Apps	(Gls)
1967–1974	Fram		
1975	Víkingur Ólafsvík		
1976–1979	Fram	64	(6)
1980	FH	17	(1)
1981–1984	Þróttur Reykjavík		
1985	Fram	17	(0)

International career
1966	Iceland U19	5	(0)
1984	Iceland U21	1	(0)
1970–1984	Iceland	32	(1)

Managerial career
- 1974: ÍR
- 1975: Víkingur Ólafsvík
- 1980: FH
- 1981–1984: þróttur
- 1985–1991: Fram
- 1991–1995: Iceland
- 1992–1994: Iceland U21
- 1996–1999: Fram
- 2000–2005: Þróttur
- 2006: Fram
- 2007: ÍR
- * Club domestic league appearances and goals

Ásgeir Elíasson (22 November 1949 – 9 September 2007) was a football manager and coach of the Iceland national football team between 1991 and 1995. He was manager of Fram Reykjavik for twelve years. Ásgeir played games for the Iceland national football team in three sports: football, handball and volleyball, before starting as professional manager.
