= 1919 Úrvalsdeild =

Season of league football in Iceland

Úrvalsdeild
- Season: 1919
- Champions: KR (2nd Icelandic title)
- Matches played: 6
- Goals scored: 19 (3.17 per match)
- Top goalscorer: Friðþjófur Thorsteinsson (7 goals)

The 1919 season of Úrvalsdeild was the eighth season of league football in Iceland. The same four teams entered this season with KR won their second title and breaking the six-year run of Fram.

== Final league table ==
Pos	Team	Pld	W	D	L	GF	GA	GD	Pts
1	KR (C)	3	2	1	0	5	2	+3	5
2	Fram	3	2	0	1	13	4	+9	4
3	Víkingur	3	1	1	1	1	2	−1	3
4	Valur	3	0	0	3	0	11	−11	0

Source: rsssf.com
Rules for classification: 1) points; 2) goal difference; 3) number of goals scored.
(C) Champions

Valur did not show up against Víkingur. The points were awarded to Vikingur with no goals credited to either team.

== Results ==
Home \ Away	FRA	VÍK	VAL	KR
Fram		2–1	9–0	2–3
Víkingur			– (Note: Valur did not appear in the game against Víkingur. Víkingur was therefore determined to be the winner, but - contrary to current practice - no goals were attributed to the two teams.)	0–0
Valur				0–2
KR				
