= 1924 Úrvalsdeild =

Úrvalsdeild
- Season: 1924

The 1924 Úrvalsdeild is a season of top-flight Icelandic football.

== Overview ==
It was contested by 4 teams, and Víkingur won the championship.

== Final league table ==
Pos	Team	Pld	W	D	L	GF	GA	GD	Pts
1	Víkingur (C)	3	3	0	0	10	2	+8	6
2	Fram	3	2	0	1	10	7	+3	4
3	KR	3	0	1	2	2	4	−2	1
4	Valur	3	0	1	2	3	12	−9	1

Source: rsssf.com
Rules for classification: 1) points; 2) goal difference; 3) number of goals scored.
(C) Champions

== Results ==
Home \ Away	FRA	KR	VAL	VÍK
Fram		2–1	7–0	3–4
KR			1–1	0–1
Valur				1–3
Víkingur				
