= 1920 in Iceland =

- Decades: 1900s; 1910s; 1920s; 1930s; 1940s
- See also: Other events in 1920 · Timeline of Icelandic history

The following lists events that happened in 1920 in Iceland.

== Incumbents ==
- Monarch – Kristján X
- Prime Minister – Jón Magnússon

== Events ==
- 1920 Úrvalsdeild

== Births ==
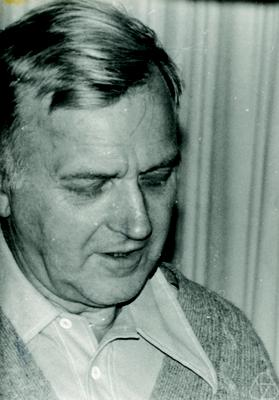
Bjarni Jónsson

- 15 February – Bjarni Jónsson, mathematician and logician (d. 2016)
- 17 May – Jón Kristjánsson, cross country skier (d. 1996).
- 13 November – Sæmundur Gíslason, footballer (d. 2003)

== Deaths ==
- 18 November – Matthías Jochumsson, poet, playwright and translator (b. 1835)
