= Ársæll Kristjánsson =

Icelandic footballer

Personal information
- Full name: Ársæll Kristjánsson
- Date of birth: 5 October 1958 (age 68)
- Place of birth: Iceland
- Position: Defender

Senior career*
Years	Team	Apps	(Gls)
1976–1979	Þróttur Reykjavík	21	(0)
1980	Hrafnkell Freysgoði	?	(?)
1981–1982	Fram	12	(1)
1983–1985	Þróttur Reykjavík	51	(3)
1986	Valur	18	(0)

International career
1976–1977	Iceland U19	2	(0)
1984–1985	Iceland	2	(0)
- * Club domestic league appearances and goals

Ársæll Kristjánsson (born 5 October 1958) is an Icelandic former footballer who played as a defender. He won two caps for the Iceland national football team; his first international appearance came in the 2–1 win against Saudi Arabia on 25 September 1984. Kristjánsson played his second and final match for Iceland in the 1–0 victory over the Faroe Islands on 12 July 1985.
