= Hermann Lindemann =

German football manager (1910–2002)

Personal information
- Date of birth: 29 October 1910
- Place of birth: Philippsthal, German Empire
- Date of death: 23 July 2002 (aged 91)
- Position: Defender

Youth career
- –1928: VfL Philippsthal

Senior career*
Years	Team	Apps	(Gls)
1928–1931	VfL Philippsthal		
1931–1932	FSV Frankfurt		
1932–1933	VfB Leipzig		
1933–1937	Kickers Offenbach		
1937–1939	Eintracht Frankfurt		
1939	VfL Germania 1894		
1939–1942	BSG IG Farben Frankfurt		
1942–1946	Eintracht Frankfurt		
1943–1944	→ WTSV Schweinfurt (loan)		
1946	Union Niederrad		

Managerial career
- 1939: Fram
- 1946–1948: Viktoria Aschaffenburg
- 1948–1949: Sportfreunde Siegen
- 1949–1951: FSV Frankfurt
- 1951–1955: Alemannia Aachen
- 1955–1957: Meidericher SV
- 1957–1960: Fortuna Düsseldorf
- 1960–1961: Eintracht Braunschweig
- 1961–1963: VfL Bochum
- 1963–1964: Duisburger SV
- 1964–1965: Eintracht Duisburg 1848
- 1965–1966: Young Fellows Zürich
- 1966–1967: Hamborn 07
- 1967–1969: Waldhof Mannheim
- 1969–1970: Borussia Dortmund
- 1970: Alemannia Aachen
- * Club domestic league appearances and goals

Hermann Lindemann (29 October 1910 – 23 July 2002) was a German football player and later manager. He played for a number of German club sides, before participating in an all-star team tour of Iceland in the summer of 1938 while playing as a striker for Eintracht Frankfurt. During the trip he was invited to coach the Icelandic side Fram. His managing career continued at Borussia Dortmund, which he managed from 1969 to 1970. He was inducted into the Fram Hall of Fame for helping the club in 1939 win its first champions title in Úrvalsdeild for fourteen years.
