= Hjálmar Þórarinsson =

Icelandic footballer

Personal information
- Date of birth: 16 February 1986 (age 40)
- Place of birth: Reykjavík, Iceland
- Height: 1.83 m (6 ft 0 in)
- Position: Striker

Team information
- Current team: Knattspyrnufélagið Berserkir

Senior career*
Years	Team	Apps	(Gls)
2002–2005	Þróttur	44	(9)
2004–2005	→ Heart of Midlothian	4	(0)
2005–2007	Heart of Midlothian	0	(0)
2006	→ Raith Rovers (loan)	11	(2)
2007–2011	Fram Reykjavik	100	(28)
2012	Berserkir	2	(1)

International career^{‡}
2005–2006	Iceland under-21s	5	(0)
- * Club domestic league appearances and goals as of 7 November 2007 ‡ National team caps and goals as of 4 March 2007

Hjálmar Þórarinsson (born 16 February 1986, in Reykjavík) is an Icelandic footballer currently playing as a striker for Berserkir.

Þórarinsson started his career with Þróttur in his native Iceland before moving to Hearts in October 2004, initially on loan. Displaying a combination of pace and power, he impressed the Tynecastle coaching staff enough in U21 and first team appearances to earn a permanent contract in May 2005. The highlight of this spell for Þórarinsson was a last minute equaliser in the Scottish League Cup semi-final against Motherwell, which Hearts eventually lost 3–2 after extra time.

An influx of established international forwards in the summer of 2005, such as Edgaras Jankauskas and Roman Bednář, ensured Þórarinsson did not feature in the Hearts first team in 2005–06. After a season of U21 football, he moved to Raith Rovers on loan until November 2006. He signed a further loan deal in January 2007, returning to Iceland with Fram until September.
