= Ólafur Thorlacius =

Icelandic merchant

Ólafur Thorlacius (1762-1815) was an Icelandic merchant based in Bíldudalur.

Thorlacius was from Hlíðarhús in Reykjavík, the son of Þórður Sighvatsson and Ingiríður Ólafsdóttir Thorlacius. He received the distinction of Knight of the Dannebrog from the King of Denmark.
