= Einar Pálsson =

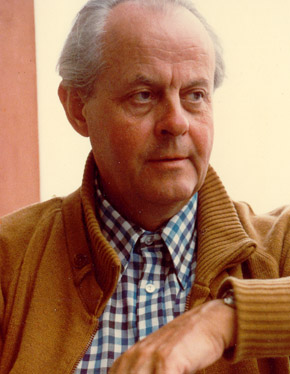
Einar Pálsson.

Einar Pálsson (1925–1996) was an Icelandic writer. He was born in Reykjavík, Iceland. He is best known for his theories about the origin of the Icelandic Saga literature as relict mythology of pagan ritual landscapes. He acquired a cand. phil. degree in 1946, and a BA degree in English and Danish in 1957 (University of Iceland). He graduated from The Royal Academy of Dramatic Art in London in 1948. In 1995 he was awarded The Knight's Cross of the Order of the Falcon by the president of Iceland as recognition of his research into Old Icelandic literature. In 1969 he put forward his theories about the roots of Icelandic culture and developed them further in a series of 11 books. His theories can be grouped into four categories:

== Theories ==
=== The mythology theory of Saga origin ===
The Old Norse (Icelandic) Saga literature has a mythological background. The characters of the Sagas originated as personifications of mythological concepts such as fertility, justice, time, death and the four elements. Einar argued that many of the potential symbols in the Sagas would become meaningful when matched with symbols occurring in Mediterranean and Celtic mythology. In Njáls saga in particular, Kári would become associated with time and air, Njáll with creation, fertility and water, Skarphéðinn with death, justice and fire, Höskuldr with grain and fertility, Gunnar with the Sun, Mörðr with the Earth and Bergthora with the Underworld. The mythology was that of the Norse fertility deities Freyr and Freyja who were based on the same principles as fertility deities in the Mediterranean region, primarily Osiris and Isis. The fertility mythology became part of a local ritual landscape in each main valley of Iceland, - the same geographical unit as that of the Sagas. The establishment of the ritual landscape was, according to Einar's thesis, a vital part of the 9th-10th century settlement process, a way of taming the virgin landscape, - creating cosmos out of chaos. With time this localized mythology merged to a varying degree with historical characters and their actions, to become the material for the Saga writers centuries later.

=== The theory of the allegorical Sagas ===
Some of the Saga writers seem to have reworked their mythological material into full allegories. Njáls Saga, for instance, became a major allegory about the conversion to Christianity. The burning of Njáll at Bergþórshvoll was a conflagration marking the end of the pagan (and Celtic Christian) world and the advent of the new Roman Catholic era. Kári, the wind and time (equivalent to Kairos), who escaped the ordeal like a phoenix, was converted into the Holy Spirit etc. The principal aim of the writer was to Christianize the pagan ritual landscape. Other allegories, like Hrafnkels saga, were more concerned with moral messages.

=== The landscape cosmogram theory ===
The ritual landscape described above had well defined and measured dimensions. Because it was a mirror image of heavenly order and acted as a time reckoning system the most natural geometry was a circle, symbolic of the horizon and the zodiac. The circle had spokes formed by lines defined by solar movements: two of the lines corresponded to the cardinal directions and other two were solstice lines. The dimensions of the system were standardised and measured by the ancients, conforming to a progression of numbers that harmonized distance and time. The circle diameter was an important dimension. In Iceland it was 216,000 Roman feet (about 64 km). Prominent features like hills, rocks and river mouths, aligning with the spokes, were used as landmarks to fix the wheel-shaped cosmogram to the landscape. Apart from the measurements, the system proposed by Einar was similar to the huaca and ceques system of the Incas.

=== The socio-mythological theory ===
The Icelandic pagan society (930 - 1000 C.E.) was thought of as a mirror image of the heavenly organization. The (originally) 36 goðar (the priest-chieftains of the free state) represent the heavenly circle and constituted a king in a mythological sense. The goðar were the vehicles of the mythological knowledge associated with the ritual landscape. Einar assumed that German mythology was, like other neighbouring mythologies, imbued with Pythagorean/Platonic ideas about numbers and proportions as the organizing principles of the cosmos. He extended this idea to include the social organisation of pagan Iceland.

Einar posed all his ideas as hypotheses for further investigations but most of them have remained untested by other scholars. Although other scholars have noticed the mythological elements in some of the Sagas, Einar's hypotheses about the mythological origin of the Sagas remain untested. The most important prediction derived from his hypotheses is that ritual landscapes of certain well defined dimensions should have been present in pagan Europe. Einar's idea about the allegorical element in the Old Norse literature was original. A few studies have been made of allegories in the Old Norse literature since then (e.g. Ciklamini 1984, Tulinius 2004 for Egils saga and Einarsson for Rauðúlfs þáttr). Gunnarsson 1995 and Birgisson 2004, tested hypotheses about the dimensions of human settlement in a ritual landscape, the latter one in Sweden and Denmark. Recent developments in archaeoastronomy and the growing awareness of ritual landscapes have tended to underpin Einar's theories.

== Bibliography ==
Books by Einar Pálsson

In Icelandic

- Baksvið Njálu (The Background of Njáls Saga), 1969. Mímir, Reykjavík.
- Trú og landnám (Religion and the Settlement of Iceland), 1970. Mímir, Reykjavík.
- Tíminn og Eldurinn (Time and Fire), 1972. Mímir, Reykjavík.
- Steinkross (Stone Cross), 1976. Mímir, Reykjavík.
- Rammislagur (Rammislagur), 1978. Mímir, Reykjavík.
- Arfur Kelta (Celtic Heritage), 1981. Mímir, Reykjavík.
- Hvolfþak himins (The Dome of Heaven), 1985. Mímir, Reykjavík.
- Stefið. Heiðinn siður og Hrafnkels saga (The Theme. Paganism and Hrafnkels Saga),1988. Mímir, Reykjavík.
- Egils Saga og Úlfar tveir (Egils Saga and Two Wolves), 1990. Mímir, Reykjavík.
- Alþingi hið forna (The Ancient Althing), 1991. Mímir, Reykjavík.
- Kristnitakan og Kirkja Péturs í Skálaholti (The Conversion to Christianity and the Church of St Peter in Skálaholt), 1995. Mímir, Reykjavík. ISBN 9979-9117-1-9

In English

- The Sacred Triangle of Pagan Iceland, 1993. Mímir, Reykjavík. ISBN 9979-3-0528-2
- Evil and the Earth. The Symbolic Background of Mörðr Valgarðsson in Njáls Saga. A Study in Medieval Allegory, 1994. Mímir, Reykjavík. ISBN 9979-9117-0-0
- Allegory of Njáls Saga and its basis in Pythagorean thought, 1998. Mímir, Reykjavík. ISBN 9979-9117-2-7

== Other related bibliography ==
- Andrén, Anders, Kristina Jennbert, and Catharina Raudvere, eds. 2006. Old Norse Religion in Long-term Perspectives: Origins, Changes and Interactions. Nordic Academic Press. 416 pp. ISBN 978-91-89116-81-8.
