= Heiðar Geir Júlíusson =

Icelandic footballer (born 1987)

Personal information
- Date of birth: August 16, 1987 (age 39)
- Place of birth: Akureyri, Iceland
- Height: 1.74 m (5 ft 9 in)
- Position: Midfielder

Team information
- Current team: Grorud (assistant)

Senior career*
Years	Team	Apps	(Gls)
2005–2007	Fram Reykjavik	65	(7)
2007	Hammarby IF	9	(1)
2008–2009	Fram Reykjavik	55	(6)
2010–2012	Ängelholms FF	34	(5)
2013	Fylkir	6	(0)
2013	IFK Uddevalla	2	(0)
2014	Þróttur	0	(0)
2014	→ Ham Kam (loan)	15	(0)
2015	IK Brage	24	(4)
2016	IK Gauthiod		
2017–	Þróttur	0	(0)

International career
2003–2004	Iceland U17	6	(0)
2004–2005	Iceland U19	7	(0)
2006–2008	Iceland U21	9	(0)

Managerial career
- 2020–2022: Kvik Halden (coach/assistant)
- 2022: Kvik Halden
- 2023: Ørn Horten
- 2024–2025: Tromsdalen (assistant)
- 2026–: Grorud (assistant)
- * Club domestic league appearances and goals as of 2 March 2016

Heiðar Geir Júlíusson (born 16 August 1987) is an Icelandic footballer and manager who played as a midfielder.

He joined the coaching staff of Kvik Halden FK in 2020. In early 2022, he became acting head coach after Jørgen La Cour Strand had to take a health leave. After guiding Kvik Halden through 2022, Júlíusson did not reach an agreement regarding a continued deal. Instead, he signed for FK Ørn Horten as their new head coach. He left Ørn to become assistant manager of Tromsdalen UIL in 2024. Ahead of the 2026 season he assumed the same position in Grorud IL.
