= Pétur J. Thorsteinsson =

Icelandic merchant

- Born: 4 June 1854; Otradalur, Danish Iceland
- Died: 27 July 1929 (aged 75); Hafnarfjörður, Kingdom of Iceland
- Spouse: Ásthildur Guðmundsdóttir

Pétur Jens Thorsteinsson (4 June 1854 – 27 July 1929) was an Icelandic businessman, merchant and entrepreneur. He was one of the key founders of Milljónarfélagið along with Thor Jensen.

== Family ==
Pétur was married to Ásthildur Guðmundsdóttir. Their children include artist Muggur and footballers Samuel Thorsteinsson, Gunnar Thorsteinsson and Friðþjófur Thorsteinsson.
