= Thrainn Sigurdsson =

Icelandic chess player (1912–2004)

Personal information
- Born: 12 November 1912
- Died: 18 August 2004 (aged 91)

Chess career
- Country: Iceland

Thrainn Sigurdsson (12 November 1912 – 18 August 2004) was an Icelandic chess player.

He was one of the strongest chess players in Iceland in the early 1930s.

Sigurdsson played for Iceland in the Chess Olympiad:

- In 1933, at second board in the 5th Chess Olympiad in Folkestone (+2, =3, -9).
