= Sigurður Ólafsson =

Sigurður Ólafsson may refer to:

- Sigurður Ólafsson (footballer) (1916–2009), Icelandic footballer
- Sigurður Ólafsson (swimmer) (born 1954), Icelandic swimmer
