= 1916 Úrvalsdeild =

Úrvalsdeild
- Season: 1916
- Champions: Fram (4th Icelandic title)
- Matches played: 3
- Goals scored: 13 (4.33 per match)

The 1916 season of Úrvalsdeild was the fifth season of league football in Iceland. The same three teams participated that entered last year with Fram winning the championship for a fourth time in a row.

== Final league table ==
Pos	Team	Pld	W	D	L	GF	GA	GD	Pts
1	Fram (C)	2	1	1	0	4	3	+1	3
2	KR	2	0	2	0	5	5	0	2
3	Valur	2	0	1	1	4	5	−1	1

Rules for classification: 1) points; 2) goal difference; 3) number of goals scored.
(C) Champions

== Results ==
Home \ Away	FRA	KR	VAL
Fram		2–2	2–1
KR			3–3
Valur			
