= 1922 Úrvalsdeild =

Úrvalsdeild
- Season: 1922

The 1922 Úrvalsdeild is a season of top-flight Icelandic football.

== Overview ==
It was contested by 3 teams, with Fram winning the championship.

== Final league table ==
Pos	Team	Pld	W	D	L	GF	GA	GD	Pts
1	Fram (C)	2	2	0	0	7	0	+7	4
2	Víkingur	2	0	1	1	1	1	0	1
3	KR	2	0	1	1	1	8	−7	1

Source: rsssf.com
Rules for classification: 1) points; 2) goal difference; 3) number of goals scored.
(C) Champions

== Results ==
Home \ Away	FRA	VÍK	KR
Fram		– (Note: Víkingur went off the field against Fram. Fram was therefore determined to be the winner, however - contrary to current practice - no goals were attributed to the two teams.)	7–0
Víkingur			1–1
KR			
