= 1916 Icelandic community service referendum =

- 21 October 1916

Results
Choice	Votes	%
Yes	1,016	8.24%
No	11,313	91.76%
Valid votes	12,329	87.41%
Invalid or blank votes	1,776	12.59%
Total votes	14,105	100.00%
Registered voters/turnout	28,529	49.44%

A referendum on community service was held in Iceland on 21 October 1916. Voters were asked whether they approved of introduction of compulsory community service. It was rejected by 92% of voters.

== Results ==
Choice	Votes	%
For	1,016	8.24
Against	11,313	91.76
Total	12,329	100.00
Valid votes	12,329	87.41
Invalid/blank votes	1,776	12.59
Total votes	14,105	100.00
Registered voters/turnout	28,529	49.44
Source: Nohlen & Stöver
