= Helgi Hóseasson =

Icelandic activist (1919–2009)

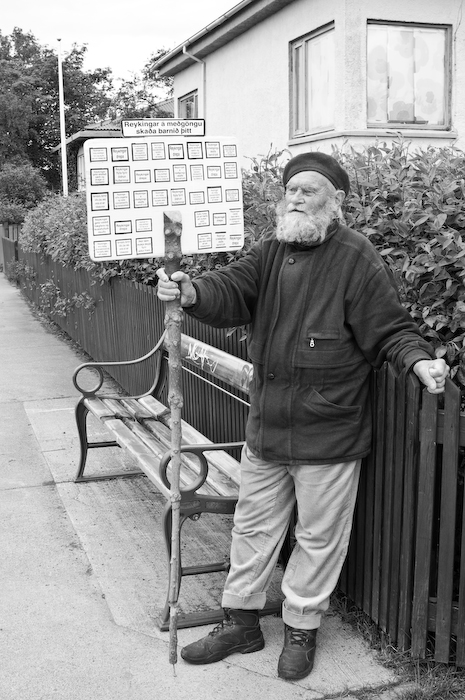
- Born: November 21, 1919; Breiðdalur, Iceland
- Died: September 6, 2009 (aged 89)
- Known for: Human rights advocacy, atheist activist, Skepticism

Helgi Hóseasson (November 21, 1919 – September 6, 2009) was an Icelandic carpenter, atheist and socialist.

== Biography ==
In 1962, he started a campaign to have his baptismal covenant annulled. At first he sought recourse from bishop Sigurbjörn Einarsson who told him that the baptismal covenant was permanent and could not be annulled. Helgi then contacted several other clergymen without getting results to his liking. He then sought legal recourse, pursuing the case through the Icelandic court system and finally appealing to the European Court of Human Rights, all without success. At this point Helgi believed that the only course remaining open to him was direct action. On October 16, 1966, he attended service at the Reykjavík Cathedral. Helgi went to the altar as if to receive communion but instead of consuming the wine and the bread he threw both items into a trash bag and then addressed the congregation, declaring his baptismal covenant annulled and "protesting the hatred of humanity which is the basis of the accursed Christian religion".

After the event at the cathedral, Helgi's quest turned towards getting Statistics Iceland to register the annulment of his baptismal covenant. It quickly became apparent that this was a wish the relevant authorities were not inclined to grant. Helgi then started a campaign of protests and disruptions of church services. In 1972, he decided the time had come for more decisive action. On October 10, the Althing came into session with a traditional procession of members of parliament, the president of the republic, and the bishop of Iceland to the Reykjavík cathedral. Helgi approached the procession and showered it with skyr. He succeeded in getting skyr on most members of parliament before being stopped by the police. The action succeeded in getting Helgi national attention and arousing some, but limited sympathy for his cause. After being arrested by the police, he was involuntarily committed to a psychiatric hospital, where a psychiatrist diagnosed him as probably having querulous paranoia.

Later actions by Helgi included sprinkling tar on Stjórnarráðshúsið, the seat of government, in 1974, breaking windows in the same building in 1976, and sprinkling a chemical mixture on the same building in 1981. In 1982 he was implicated in burning down the church he had received confirmation in. Despite his decades-long campaign and frequent arrests, Helgi was never charged with a crime.
