= 1915 Úrvalsdeild =

Úrvalsdeild
- Season: 1915
- Champions: Fram (3rd Icelandic title)
- Matches played: 6
- Goals scored: 17 (2.83 per match)

The 1915 season of Úrvalsdeild was the fourth season of league football in Iceland and the first for three years. Fram won the championship for a third time in a row.

== Final league table ==
| Pos | Team | Pld | W | D | L | GF | GA | GD | Pts |
|---|---|---|---|---|---|---|---|---|---|
| 1 | Fram (C) | 2 | 2 | 0 | 0 | 7 | 4 | +3 | 4 |
| 2 | KR | 2 | 1 | 0 | 1 | 9 | 6 | +3 | 2 |
| 3 | Valur | 2 | 0 | 0 | 2 | 1 | 7 | −6 | 0 |

Rules for classification: 1) points; 2) goal difference; 3) number of goals scored.
(C) Champions

== Results ==
| Home \ Away | FRA | KR | VAL |
|---|---|---|---|
| Fram | | 5–4 | 2–0 |
| KR | | | 5–1 |
| Valur | | | |
