= Torfhildur Þorsteinsdóttir =

Icelandic author (1845–1918)

Torfhildur Þorsteinsdóttir Hólm

Torfhildur Þorsteinsdóttir, also known as Torfhildur Hólm (2 February 1845 – 14 November 1918) was an Icelandic author who lived for many years in Canada. She was perhaps the first Icelander to make a living as an author, and is frequently cited as the first Icelandic woman novelist.

== Biography ==
Torfhildur was born at Kálfafellsstaður in Skaftafellssýsla (now in Austur-Skaftafellssýsla), where her father, Þorsteinn Einarson, was a clergyman. She went to Reykjavík at age 17 and studied there and in Copenhagen and worked as a private teacher before marrying Jakob Hólm when she was 29. He died a year later and in 1876 she emigrated to Canada, where she lived in New Iceland and Winnipeg for 13 years. After working as a teacher for a number of years, she returned to Iceland in 1889 and two years later was granted a writer's pension by the Althing, the first woman to receive such artistic support; there was disagreement about the appropriateness of the award and it was reduced and ultimately made part of her widow's pension. She died in Reykjavík during the worldwide pandemic of Spanish flu of 1918–1920.

== Work ==
She published her first short story in 1879 in Framfari, the first Icelandic newspaper published in North America. Her first novel, Brynjolfur Sveinsson biskup, was published in Reykjavík in 1882 and was both the first novel and first work by a female author to be formally printed in Iceland. Elding (1889) is a historical novel. Some of her work appeared in a Danish periodical published in Chicago, Illustrered Familjeblad. After her return to Iceland she edited two literary journals, Draupnir and Dvöl, in which her short fiction and two later novels appeared, and a children's magazine, Tíbrá. The folk tales she collected from Icelanders in Canada during her first few years there were published in 1962, and point, according to folklorist David Buchan, to an interesting difference between the Icelandic and the Faroese traditions; in the latter the ballad tradition is one of male public performance, where the Icelandic tradition is found in the female, domestic sphere.

Her writing shows both romantic and realist traits; some of her short stories are fables and allegories, but others deal with contemporary life, with the importance of women's education as a recurring theme. As a historical novelist, she is credited with giving the genre "its most capable treatment" among Icelandic authors.

== List of publications ==
=== Novels ===
- Brynjólfur Sveinsson biskup (1882)
- Kjartan og Guðrún (1886)
- Elding (1889)
- Högni og Ingibjörg (1889)
- Jón biskup Vídalín (Draupnir)
- Jón biskup Arason (Draupnir)

=== Short fiction ===
- "Spekingurinn og heimskinginn" (Framfari, 1878)
- "Andvari" (Illustrered Familjeblad, Chicago, 1878)
- "Guð heyrir börnin" (Framfari, 1878)
- "Stjarnan mín" (Framfari, 1878)
- "Seint fyrnist forn ást" (Framfari, 1879)
- "Tárablómið" (Framfari, 1879)
- "Heiðarbærinn" (Framfari, 1879)
- "Gunnlög og Sigrid" (Illustrered Familjeblad, 1880)
- Sögur og ævintýri (1884; collection)
- Smásögur handa börnum og unglingum (1886; collection of children's stories)
- Barnasögur (1890; collection of children's stories)
- Þjóðsögur og sagnir (1962; ed. Finnur Sigmundsson)
