= 1923 Úrvalsdeild =

Úrvalsdeild
- Season: 1923

The 1923 Úrvalsdeild is a season of top-flight Icelandic football.

== Overview ==
It was contested by 4 teams, and Fram won the championship.

== Final league table ==
Pos	Team	Pld	W	D	L	GF	GA	GD	Pts
1	Fram (C)	3	3	0	0	12	2	+10	6
2	KR	3	2	0	1	8	4	+4	4
3	Valur	3	0	1	2	3	10	−7	1
4	Víkingur	3	0	1	2	2	9	−7	1

Source: rsssf.com
Rules for classification: 1) points; 2) goal difference; 3) number of goals scored.
(C) Champions

== Results ==
Home \ Away	FRA	KR	VAL	VÍK
Fram		3–0	6–1	3–1
KR			3–1	5–0
Valur				1–1
Víkingur				
