= Benedikt Kristjánsson =

Icelandic tenor

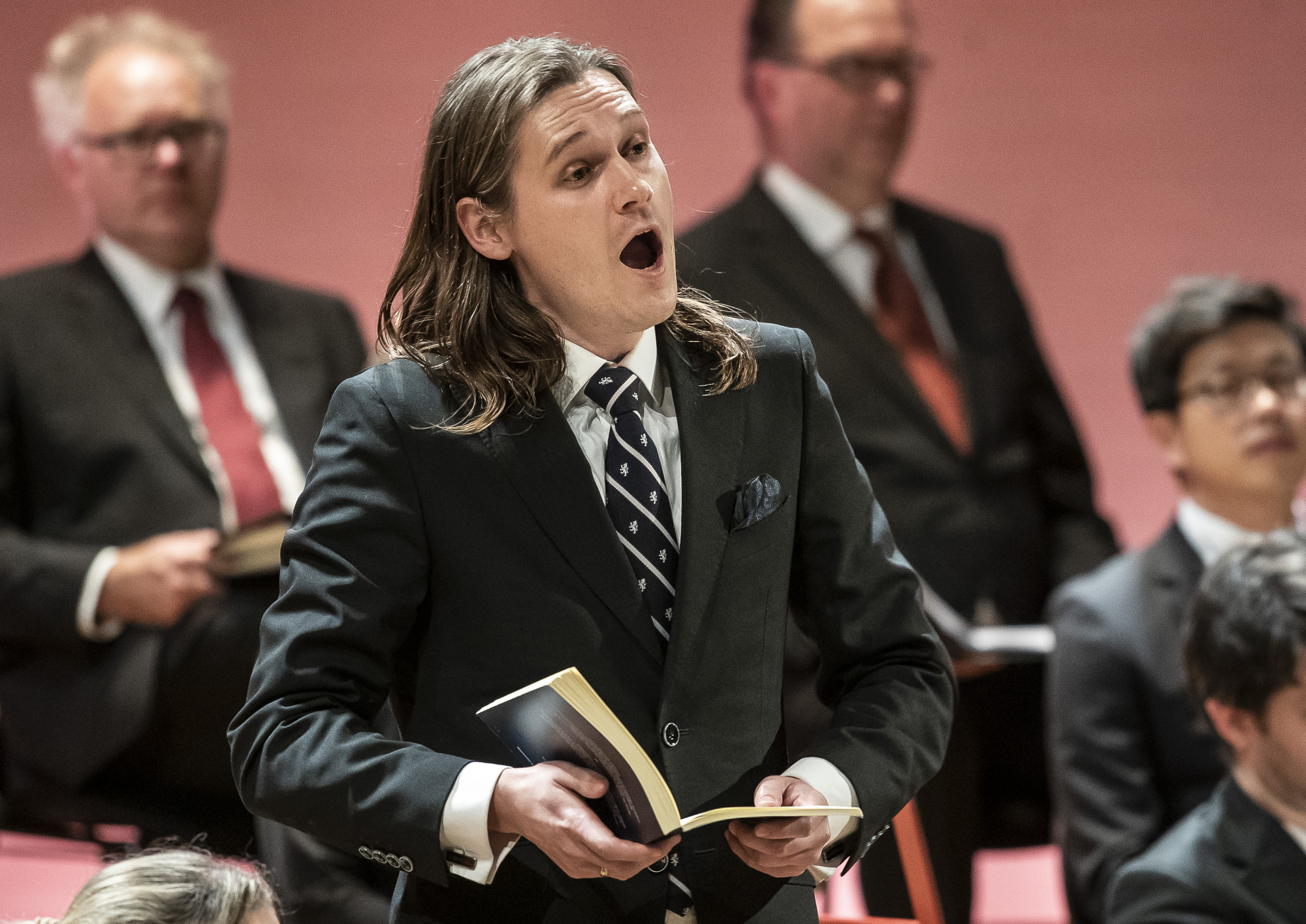
- Benedikt Kristjánsson in 2018
- Born: 23 September 1987 (age 38); Húsavík, Iceland
- Occupation: Operatic tenor
- Awards: International Johann Sebastian Bach Competition
- Website: www.kristjansson-tenor.com

Benedikt Kristjánsson (born 23 September 1987) is an Icelandic operatic and concert tenor who lives in Germany and has appeared internationally. He focuses on baroque music, especially by Johann Sebastian Bach, but has also performed and recorded romantic lieder and contemporary music. He has performed Bach's St John Passion in an arrangement for one singer, keyboard and percussion, in a live broadcast from Bach's resting place at the Thomaskirche on Good Friday in 2020.

== Life ==
Benedikt Kristjánsson was born in Húsavík. He studied first with his mother at the Reykjavik Academy of Singing and Vocal Arts. In 2007, he graduated from the Reykjavík Conservatory of Music. He continued his studies at the Hochschule für Musik Hanns Eisler Berlin with Scot Weir. He took masterclasses with Elly Ameling, Robert Holl, Christa Ludwig, Thomas Quasthoff, Andreas Schmidt and Peter Schreier, and with pianist Helmut Deutsch. He won the first prize at the International Bach Vocal Competition in Greifswald in 2011. In 2012, he was awarded the audience prize of the International Bach Competition.

Benedikt has performed at international festivals such as the Musikfest Stuttgart, Thüringer Bachwochen, Halle Handel Festival, Bachwoche Ansbach and Festival Oude Muziek in Utrecht. He made his debut at the Staatsoper Berlin in the title role of Wolfgang Mitterer's children's opera Das tapfere Schneiderlein. He appeared in three roles in a revival of Lully's Atys at the Theater Kiel in 2014. In 2015, he appeared with the Deutsche Kammerphilharmonie Bremen in a leading role in a community opera (German: Stadtteil-Oper), Sehnsucht nach Isfahan, with music by Handel, Mohammad Reza Mortazavi and Rabih Lahoud.

With others, he arranged Bach's St John Passion for one singer, keyboard and percussion, intended for audience participation in the chorales. Entitled Johannespassion für Tenor allein, Cembalo, Orgel und Schlagwerk (transl. St John Passion for tenor solo, harpsichord, organ and percussion), it was performed in 2019 by Podium Esslingen, with Elina Albach playing harpsichord and organ, and Philipp Lamprecht as the percussionist. The performance was recorded live. It received the Opus Klassik award in the category Most Innovative Concert of the Year. A performance at Bach's resting place at the Thomaskirche on Good Friday 2020 was broadcast on radio and television. Due to the COVID-19 pandemic, there was no audience, and therefore the chorales were added by a vocal ensemble at the church, conducted by Gotthold Schwarz, and choirs from Germany, Switzerland, Canada and Malaysia. The concert was organized by the Bachfest Leipzig festival, while the festival in June, and the traditional performances of Bach's Passion on Good Friday, had to be cancelled. The event was described as "Passion trotz(t) Pandemie" (transl. "Passion, proof against the pandemic"). Jan Brachmann of the Neue Musikzeitung wrote, concerning Benedikt's depiction of Peter's weeping bitterly, that his "first crying is an onomatopoeic picture of the event: through the artistically accomplished singing we listen to a life that was not yet art, but an immediate expression of sound. The second crying, however, is no longer an image painted with sound, but is taken back from the external representation to the innermost." (Note: German: "Sein erstes Weinen ist ein lautmalerisches Bild des Vorgangs: Wir hören durch den künstlerisch vollendeten Gesang hindurch auf ein Leben, das noch nicht Kunst war, sondern unmittelbare Lautäußerung. Das zweite Weinen aber ist kein mit Klang gemaltes Bild mehr, sondern aus der äußerlichen Darstellung ganz zurückgenommen in die Innerlichkeit.") The reviewer regarded the tenor as taking up the inheritance of Peter Schreier as the Evangelist.

== Recordings ==
In 2019, Benedikt recorded lieder by Schubert combined with Icelandic folk songs, entitled Drang in die Ferne, which he also performed in concert, with hornist Tillmann Höfs and pianist Alexander Schmalcz. A reviewer wrote that he sang the folk songs without accompaniment, only one of them with a horn playing parallel fifths. He was the Evangelist in Bach's St Matthew Passion with the Gaechinger Cantorey, conducted by Hans-Christoph Rademann. In 2020, he recorded the first Dublin version of Handel's Messiah with the group, alongside Dorothee Mields, Benno Schachtner and Tobias Berndt. A reviewer described his "lovely focused lyric voice", with excellent English, impressive passage-work and Baroque ornamentation. In 2023, he released the CD Judas, containing arias and recitatives by J.S. Bach, which received positive reviews; a critic for the magazine Gramophone wrote that Benedikt was "less singer, more musician – and I write that as an entirely good thing."
