= 1925 Úrvalsdeild =

Úrvalsdeild
- Season: 1925

The 1925 Úrvalsdeild is a season of top-flight Icelandic football.

== Overview ==
It was contested by 4 teams, and Fram won the championship.

== Final league table ==
Pos	Team	Pld	W	D	L	GF	GA	GD	Pts
1	Fram (C)	3	2	1	0	5	1	+4	5
2	Víkingur	3	1	2	0	6	4	+2	4
3	KR	3	1	1	1	7	4	+3	3
4	Valur	3	0	0	3	2	11	−9	0

Source: rsssf.com
Rules for classification: 1) points; 2) goal difference; 3) number of goals scored.
(C) Champions

== Results ==
Home \ Away	FRA	KR	VAL	VÍK
Fram		2–1	3–0	0–0
KR			4–0	1–1
Valur				3–4
Víkingur				
