= 1918 Úrvalsdeild =

Úrvalsdeild
- Season: 1918
- Champions: Fram (6th Icelandic title)
- Matches played: 6
- Goals scored: 32 (5.33 per match)
- Top goalscorer: Friðþjófur Thorsteinsson (12 goals)

The 1918 season of Úrvalsdeild was the seventh season of league football in Iceland. The league this expanded to four teams with Víkingur joining the league for the first time as Fram won the championship.

== Final league table ==
Pos	Team	Pld	W	D	L	GF	GA	GD	Pts
1	Fram (C)	3	3	0	0	14	5	+9	6
2	Víkingur	3	2	0	1	11	8	+3	4
3	Valur	3	1	0	2	4	7	−3	2
4	KR	3	0	0	3	3	12	−9	0

Rules for classification: 1) points; 2) goal difference; 3) number of goals scored.
(C) Champions

== Results ==
Home \ Away	FRA	VÍK	VAL	KR
Fram		6–3	2–1	6–1
Víkingur			5–0	3–2
Valur				3–1
KR				
