= 1921 Úrvalsdeild =

Úrvalsdeild
- Season: 1921

The 1921 Úrvalsdeild was a season of top-flight Icelandic football.

== Overview ==
It was contested by three teams, all based in Reykjavík, and Fram won the championship, having finished bottom of the table the previous year.

== Final league table ==
Pos	Team	Pld	W	D	L	GF	GA	GD	Pts
1	Fram (C)	2	2	0	0	10	1	+9	4
2	Víkingur	2	1	0	1	3	6	−3	2
3	KR	2	0	0	2	3	9	−6	0

Source: rsssf.com
Rules for classification: 1) points; 2) goal difference; 3) number of goals scored.
(C) Champions

== Results ==
Home \ Away	FRA	VÍK	KR
Fram		4–0	6–1
Víkingur			3–2
KR			
