= Ragnar Sigtryggsson =

Icelandic footballer

Personal information
- Date of birth: 26 May 1925
- Date of death: 31 March 2009 (aged 83)

International career
Years	Team	Apps	(Gls)
1957	Iceland	1	(0)

Ragnar Sigtryggsson (26 May 1925 – 31 March 2009) was an Icelandic footballer. He played in one match for the Iceland national football team in 1957.
