= Matthías Kristjánsson =

Icelandic cross-country skier (1924–1998)

Matthías Kristjánsson (July 14, 1924 – December 23, 1998) was an Icelandic cross-country skier who competed in the 1950s. He finished 33rd in the 50 km event at the 1952 Winter Olympics in Oslo.
