= 1917 Úrvalsdeild =

Úrvalsdeild
- Season: 1917
- Champions: Fram (5th Icelandic title)
- Matches played: 3
- Goals scored: 15 (5 per match)

The 1917 season of Úrvalsdeild was the sixth season of league football in Iceland. The same three teams participated that entered last year with Fram winning the championship for the fifth time in a row.

== Final league table ==
Pos	Team	Pld	W	D	L	GF	GA	GD	Pts
1	Fram (C)	2	2	0	0	7	5	+2	4
2	KR	2	1	0	1	5	5	0	2
3	Valur	2	0	0	2	3	5	−2	0

Rules for classification: 1) points; 2) goal difference; 3) number of goals scored.
(C) Champions

== Results ==
Home \ Away	FRA	KR	VAL
Fram		4–3	3–2
KR			2–1
Valur			
