= Kristján Karlsson =

Icelandic poet and writer

Kristján Karlsson (26 January 1922 – August 5, 2014) was an Icelandic poet and writer born at Eyvík in Tjörnes in Þingeyjarsýsla South. He studied English literature at the University of California, Berkeley in California, graduating with a B.A. degree in 1945. He went to New York City for graduate studies at the Columbia University, completing an M.A. degree in comparative literature in 1947.

Karlsson was a member of the Board of the Icelandic Literary Society in 1979 and the Patriotic Society from 1984 to 1985. He has written poetry, short stories, essays and articles, as well as being a translator. He has also edited several books. He published the poetry collection Kvæði ("Poems") in 1976. He was awarded the Davíðspenninn (the Pen of Davíð) in 1991 for Kvæði 90 ("Poems 90") and The National Broadcasting Service Writer's Award a year later.
