= Knattspyrnufélagið Fram =

Fram Reykjavík
- Full name: Knattspyrnufélagið Fram
- Nicknames: Framarar, The Blues (Icelandic: Þeir Bláu)
- Founded: 1 May 1908; 118 years ago
- Ground: Lambhagavöllur, Úlfarsárdal; Reykjavík, Iceland
- Capacity: 1.650
- Website: www.fram.is
Home colours	Away colours

Knattspyrnufélagið Fram (Icelandic pronunciation: [ˈkʰnahtˌspɪ(r)tnʏˌfjɛːˌlaijɪð ˈfram], lit. 'Fram Football Club' (Note: Knattspyrnufélagið is the definite form of Knattspyrnufélag, meaning "the football club".)) is a professional Icelandic multi-sport club, best known for its football and handball teams. It was founded on 1 May 1908 in Reykjavík. It was based at Safamýri, in the Háaleiti og Bústaðir district near Reykjavík city centre until 2006 when Fram started slowly moving operations to Úlfarsárdalur in the newly established Grafarholt district. Fram has been based fully in Úlfarsárdalur since mid 2022.

The men's football team currently plays in the top division, the Besta deild karla after being promoted in the 2021 season. The women's football team also currently plays in the top division, the Besta deild kvenna after being promoted in the 2024 season

The club also has strong handball teams; the men's team won the Icelandic championship and Icelandic cup in 2025. Both teams play in the top division of icelandic handball.

Other sports offered by the club include taekwondo and skiing.

== Football ==
=== Men's football ===
Men's Team
- Manager: Rúnar Kristinsson
- League: Besta deild karla
- 2026: 3rd out of 12

Fram is one of the most successful clubs in Iceland: it has eighteen national championship titles and seven national cup titles, and it is regarded as one of the biggest teams in Iceland. Fram dominated Icelandic football in the 1980s and early 1990s. They were relegated from the top division in 2005, but after one year in the men's second tier, they returned to the top flight in 2007. They were again relegated to the men's second tier in 2014 but returned to the first division in 2022 after winning the second tier in 2021.

==== Current squad ====
As of 15 August 2026

Note: Flags indicate national team as defined under FIFA eligibility rules; some limited exceptions apply. Players may hold more than one non-FIFA nationality.

No.	Pos.	Nation	Player
1	GK	ISL	Sigurjón Dadi Hardarson
3	DF	ISL	Þorri Stefán Þorbjörnsson
5	DF	USA	Kyle McLagan
7	DF	ISL	Kristófer Konráðsson
8	DF	ISL	Haraldur Einar Ásgrímsson
9	FW	ISL	Róbert Hauksson
10	FW	BRA	Fred Saraiva
12	MF	SWE	Simon Tibbling
14	MF	ISL	Bjarni Páll Runólfsson
15	FW	SWE	Jakob Byström

No.	Pos.	Nation	Player
16	DF	ESP	Israel García
17	FW	ISL	Atli Þór Jónasson (on loan from Víkingur)
18	MF	ISL	Ægir Jarl Jónasson
19	DF	DEN	Kennie Chopart
22	GK	ISL	Viktor Sigurdsson
23	MF	ISL	Már Ægisson
25	MF	ISL	Freyr Sigurdsson
26	DF	ISL	Sigurjón Rúnarsson
27	MF	ISL	Sigfús Gudmundsson
29	FW	ISL	Vuk Oskar Dimitrijevic

==== On loan ====
Note: Flags indicate national team as defined under FIFA eligibility rules; some limited exceptions apply. Players may hold more than one non-FIFA nationality.

No. / Pos. / Nation / Player; 11 / MF / ISL / Magnús Þórdarson (at Þróttur)	No. / Pos. / Nation / Player; 21 / DF / ISL / Óliver Elis Hlynsson (at ÍR)

=== Women's football ===
Women's team
- Manager: Anton Ingi Rúnarsson
- League: Besta deild kvenna
- 2025: 8th out of 10

Fram entered a women's team into competition in 2010, for the first time since 1993. In 2017 Fram joined forces with Afturelding and the entered a joint team, which got promoted to the second tier and played there in 2018. The partnership ended before the 2019 season and Fram did not enter a women's team in 2019. Fram again entered a women's team in 2020 and finished in seventh place in the third tier. Fram then won the third tier in 2022 and got promoted to the second tier. Fram finished second on goal difference in the 2024 season, their second season in the second tier, and earned promotion to the first division. Fram finished 8th in the first division in 2025 and maintained their place in the division.

==== Current squad ====
Note: Flags indicate national team as defined under FIFA eligibility rules; some limited exceptions apply. Players may hold more than one non-FIFA nationality.

No.	Pos.	Nation	Player
1	GK	USA	Ashley Orkus
3	DF	ISL	Olga Ingibjörg Einarsdóttir
4	DF	USA	Emma Kate young

== Basketball ==
In the 1970s and 1980s, Fram men's basketball team won four championships in the second-tier 1. deild karla. Its best season came in 1981–1982 when the team won the Icelandic cup and finished second in the top-tier Úrvalsdeild karla. The clubs basketball program was active from 1970 to 1987 and was discontinued after the ´86–87 season. It had a brief revitalization in the 2010s, playing three seasons the 2. deild karla from 2010 to 2013 and making it to the playoffs in 2012 and 2013. Fram no longer plays basketball

== History ==
=== The first years (1908–1928) ===
The football club was established in spring 1908, in Reykjavík. The club was started by several boys around 13 years old, or almost, living in the area around Tjarnargata, near the centre of Reykjavík. One group member, Peter J. H. Magnusson, had bought a football and the football was used and provided all summer. The first football club was almost in this very informal company. No board was appointed, no written laws and the club did not even have a name. From this was added to the first formal meeting, on 15 March 1909. With the approach of Spring, the local footballers convened a meeting. Soon it got more serious and the boys started meeting more often and in the end the club Fram or Kári like the first name of the club was, became a real Football club. The first name of the club was Kári, but later on the name was changed to Fram which it has been ever since. The first Icelandic championship was in 1912, which KR Reykjavík won. Fram came second in that year.

=== League dominance 1913–1919 ===
From 1913 to 1919 Fram Reykjavík was unbeatable. The 1913 season was the second season of Úrvalsdeild. The 1914–19 proved to be even more fruitful, the club won six consecutive league titles from 1913 through to 1919, Fram Reykjavík won 1913 as the only entrant. It was their first ever title. Fram Reykjavík won again 1914. Three teams took part this season with Valur entering for the first time. Fram Reykjavík won the championship. Fram Reykjavík welcomed once again the title after draw against KR in the last match, with the highest number of points. KR protested a lot against that, and the result was that Fram Reykjavík and KR had to play a final match which Fram eventually won 3–1. In those years Fram Reykjavík was simply unbeatable and it wasn't until 1919 that they lost again. but 1921, 1922, 1923 and, 1925 the club won again. But it was a long wait for the next title. the main striker Friðþjófur Thorsteinsson also moved to Canada and never came back, after the best striker left there was no one to come instead.

=== Doing well despite World War II, 1939–1948 ===
From 1936 to 1939 Hermann Lindemann had been very successful, but it wasn't good enough for the fans as no title had yet come. So in 1939 the German superstar went home to carry on with his own career in Germany which he protested against because of World War II. During that time Fram Reykjavik had a fantastic team especially from 1946 to 1948, with Ríkharður Jónsson in the team. Shortly afterwards the world war stopped play, but in 1939 four teams contested and Fram Reykjavík won the League. Despite having one −1 goal in score they were still number one on the table.

In 1942, after beating Víkingur R at Melavöllur 2–1 in a match played in unusually cold summer weather, Fram Reykjavík came second to Valur by losing in extra time. Ríkharður Jónsson was then studying in Reykjavík and during that time Iceland's most talented soccer player ever played for Fram. The team lineup for this year was the best in Fram Reykjavik's history. the 1950s were nothing compared with 1939–1948.

=== Ups and downs during the 1960s ===
The Fram Reykjavík Handball team became one of Europe's biggest handball clubs, as did the national team. Meanwhile, the football club had done much better and Fram Reykjavík remained a top three club in Iceland, albeit achieving titles less frequently than before. 1962 was different, then Fram Reykjavík managed to win the league and 62–64 the club fought about every single title existing, but it seem like something bad has happened from 1965 to 1967 because it wasn't until then that Fram Reykjavík were number two in the league and showed they were back among the best, and the 1970s and 1980s were to be more successful. Still the team was said to have played very entertaining football. In the years that followed, the club worked more closely with the Youth club. The 1970s and 1980s were maybe Fram Reykjavík's golden age.

=== Successful 1970s ===
In 1970 Fram Reykjavík was no doubt back on top: their player Kristinn Jörundsson scored 10 goals. Fram finished second, four points behind ÍA, and thus qualified for the UEFA Cup.

In 1972 Fram Reykjavík won their first title since 1962. In 1970, 1973 and 1979 Fram Reykjavík won the Visa Cup – on the two last occasions by scoring in the final seconds. In 1975 the club was very unlucky not to win the league again. At that time several of their players were in the national football team. That summer Real Madrid, with players like Günter Netzer, visited Reykjavík and easily beat a Fram side. Guðmundur Torfason, a young Fram player, later had a successful career playing for St Mirren F.C. in Scotland.

In 1973 the Fram Reykjavík basketball team won the first Second Division championship, in the year it was founded by the Icelandic Basketball Federation (Icelandic: Körfuknattleikssamband Íslands – KKÍ).

In the 1974–75 season, Fram Reykjavík achieved the first in their series of wins in the First Division which ended in the 1985–86 season when they won their fourth title.

=== 1986–91 The best Icelandic team ===
1983: The club hired a new coach from Poland, Andrzej Strejlau. Fram Reykjavík was relegated to the men's first division, but next year, they were promoted straight back to the Premier Division. Andrzej was the coach until 1985, when he went to Greece to coach first the Greece Footballs Clubs Associations (Five Division) club Larissa but later on also the national team of Poland. Many still today consider his work with the club a big part in making the team of 1986–1991 so successful. That same year Fram Reykjavík brought in a new coach, Ásgeir Elíasson, who was about to make history. The following years turned out to be the most successful times of the club since the glorious 1913–19 seasons.

In 1986 Fram Reykjavík beat Irish Football League Glentoran in the first round of the Cup Winners' Cup and advanced to the second round, in which they played the Austrian Football Bundesliga team Rapid Vienna. After losing 3–0 in Vienna, Fram Reykjavík made Icelandic footballing history by winning the home match 2–1, thus becoming the first Icelandic football club in history to win a match in a later stage than the first round. In 1985 Fram Reykjavík won the Icelandic Cup and then in 1986 they won their first Icelandic championship since 1972. The next year the club was second in the league, but won the Visa Cup again. In 1988 the team won the league in a dominating fashion, drawing only once and losing one game and scoring a record 49 points. The record was never to be broken in a league of ten clubs, although it was equalled on two occasions. As the number of clubs in Iceland's top flight has now been increased to 12, this record will never be beaten. The titles kept coming in and in 1989 Fram Reykjavík won the Visa Cup. The football summer of 1990 was noted for the two horse race between KR and Fram Reykjavík which Fram eventually won dramatically, beating Valur 3–2 in the crucial last game of the season, after trailing 0–2 at half-time. The year 1990 was also a successful year in the Cup Winners' Cup for Fram Reykjavík. The club beat the Swedish club Djurgårdens IF Fotboll, with a 3–0 home victory in Reykjavik and a 1–1 draw in Sweden. The club played Spanish giants FC Barcelona in the second round. Fram Reykjavík lost the home game 1–2 with the winning goal coming in the final minutes. Barcelona's winning goal was somewhat controversial, as Fram Reykjavík had had strong appeals for a penalty just seconds before the goal. But as the referee waved play on, Barcelona kicked the ball forward and scored the winning goal, although the Icelandic defenders appealed for offside. Barcelona then went on to win 3–0 at Nou Camp and subsequently reached the final, which they lost to Manchester United. Although Fram Reykjavík lost the tie 5–1 on aggregate, the results are widely regarded as an Icelandic football club's best ever success in European competition.

=== 1992–2005 Fram worst years ever ===
Bad years for Fram Reykjavík 1993 Ásgeir Sigurvinsson was hired as coach to build the club again but that failed badly and the club just got worse. 1998–2004 Fram Reykjavík were always among the lowest in Úrvalsdeild and saved themselves on the last second from relegation, the club was relegated twice, in 1995 and 2005. Many coaches tried their best to put Fram Reykjavík back among the best Ólafur Þórðarson (footballer) Pétur Ormslev Guðmundur Torfason, but it wasn't until 2005, when good old Ásgeir Elíasson was hired that the wheels started turning again. He won division one very easily and brought the club back among the best before he quit. Only one year later he died, and Þorvaldur Örlygsson was hired as the new coach with new ideas .

=== 2007–2010: stable years ===
Fram Reykjavík won the second-tier championship of 1. deild karla in 2006 and finished 7th in the Landsbankadeild (the then name for the premier division) in 2007. They bought the Swedish striker Patrik Redo, whom they later had to sell to Keflavík Football Club. In 2008 Fram played their best season in many years when they finished 3rd in the Landsbankadeild. In 2009 the club was number 4, and played in the Icelandic Cup Final but lost to Breiðablik UBK in a penalty shootout. Now it seems as if Fram Reykjavík is back among the best again. Fram's woes continued in the spring of 2006. In 2008 things changed a lot though a new manager came that had been playing for Fram Reykjavík in the famous 86–91 team Þorvaldur Örlygsson. He started by buying Auðun Helgason, a former Icelandic international football player Assistant manager. For the third time in three years, a new coach would take the helm and most of the time it seemed as if nobody could lead Fram Reykjavík out of the dark. This time, however, it was a complete success. Fram Reykjavík won four straight games, gobbling up KR's lead as team number 3 in the table (a qualifying position for the UEFA Cup), and finally overtaking them. Fram Reykjavík against FH Hafnarfjörður where they won away which was for the first time in many years, the team that was supposed to be unbeatable they managed to win. The following weekend, Fram Reykjavík beat Keflavík, securing the club's third position in the league for the first time since 1992. Fram Reykjavík was back in European competition: the team that almost drew at Nou Camp 18 years ago was back, and there was more good news to come, Þorvaldur Örlygsson accepted a new offer to be the manager. The summer of 2009 came out to be not as good as expected in Úrvalsdeild Fram Reykjavík finished 4th, which was an obvious disappointment. And in Visa-Bikar 2009 Fram Reykjavík made it to the finals but lost in penalty kickout against Breiðablik UBK where Paul McShane missed the last penally for Fram Reykjavík, in UEFA Cup 2009 Fram won The New Saints F.C. easily in the first round but in the second round Fram Reykjavík traveled to Czech Republic to play Sigma Olomouc the first match went 1–1 where Sigma scored a goal almost in the last second of the match. The second match Sigma Olomouc won but Fram Reykjavík was told to have played maybe their best matches of the summer there and they showed that on a good day they could play like the big teams in Europe. Before the 2009 season Þorvaldur Örlygsson brought several new players to Fram Reykjavík, one of them being Jón Gunnar Eysteinsson who Þorvaldur Örlygsson knew well from Fjarðabyggð, he was supposed to come instead of Auðun Helgason that went to Grindavík and Some other players like the English brothers which both started their career playing for Chelsea F.C., Joe Tillen and Sam Tillen the team of 2010 was one of the youngest teams ever in Icelandic football, the oldest player was 25 years old. Still it was a summer of disappointment finishing 5th.

=== 2010–2013: Years of struggle ===
After three good mid-table years came a difficult time. In 2011 the team never really got going, but played much better in the later part of the summer after the arrival of the Scottish players Alan Lowing and Steven Lennon and managed to avoid relegation. In 2012 a lot was expected of Fram and the pre-season looked good; some commentators were forecasting Fram to win the league, but the team had difficulties scoring goals. Not much changed in the summer of 2013: in the middle of the summer Þorvaldur Örlygsson quit and Ríkharður Daðason was hired. Ríkharður started very well and in the end he won the VISA Cup, the first big title Fram had won in football for 23 years. After that cup final, however, things went downhill and the team lost most of the remaining games of the season.

=== 2014–: New manager, new team ===
Ríkharður Daðason did not stay long, and after arguments with the Board about money to buy players he decided to quit. He was replaced by Bjarni Guðjónsson. With him came big changes: all the foreign players were sold, along with some of the bigger names in the squad such as Sam Hewson and Hólmbert Friðjónsson. Instead he bought young Icelandic players from other Icelandic teams, and his own brother Jóhannes Karl Guðjónsson.

== European adventures ==
Fram Reykjavik has a long tradition of playing in both UEFA Cup and European Champions League. Still today Fram remains the only Icelandic team ever to play against both Real Madrid C.F. and Barça in European competitions. The first one was in the year of 1971 against Hibernians F.C. from Malta. Both matches were exceptionally played at Malta and Fram lost the first match 3–0 but won the second leg 2–0. In 1973 FC Basel came to Iceland and won very easily in both matches against Fram Reykjavik. In 1974 Fram traveled to Madrid in European Cup to play against Real Madrid C.F. at Santiago Bernabéu Stadium. Madrid won 6–0 but at Laugardalsvöllur it looked almost the whole match as it would end up in draw until on 74th minute when Real scored a goal and again in the last seconds of the match. In 1976 Fram Reykjavik lost against Slovan Bratislava. In 1985 Northern Ireland was Fram next stop when Fram Reykjavik won an easy victory against Glentoran F.C. in round two same the Austrian Bundesliga giants Rapid Vienna which Fram lost overall with only one goal which has to be one of the best performance of Icelandic team ever. In 1986 Fram traveled to Poland to play against Katowice in a very even duel Fram eventually lost. Sparta Prague came to Reykjavík 1987 to play against Fram Reykjavik at Laugardalsvöllur stadium. They were simply too big for the Icelandic team and won 8–0 over all. In 1988 Barça came and unexpectedly the match in Iceland was very even and it wasn't until the end of the match that FC Barcelona secured the win. In 1990 Fram Reykjavik won the Allsvenskan champions Djurgårdens IF Fotboll badly in both away and home matches over all 4–1. In the next round FC Barcelona came to Iceland again and this time Fram Reykjavik scored the first goal and it wasn't until the last 10 minutes of the game that Barcelona scored twice, eventually winning.

== Rivalries ==
=== Rivalries ===
Fram Reykjavík has significant rivalries which date back to 1920s, mainly with two clubs, intercity club KR Reykjavík and Valur. Their most high-profile rivalry is with Valur, another big Úrvalsdeild club also located in Reykjavík city center. . Notably the three sides (Valur, Fram and KR) are the most supported clubs in Reykjavík. There are also rivalries with Breiðablik UBK, FH Hafnarfjörður and Knattspyrnufélagið Víkingur.

=== Stadium ===
Fram Reykjavík played their home games at Laugardalsvöllur, Iceland's national football stadium, until 2017 when they moved to Framvöllur in Safamýri, where the Handball teams played. Fram then moved to their future home in Úlfarsárdalur in mid 2022. There the football teams play at Lambhagavöllurinn while the Handball teams play in the adjacent Lambhagahöllin.

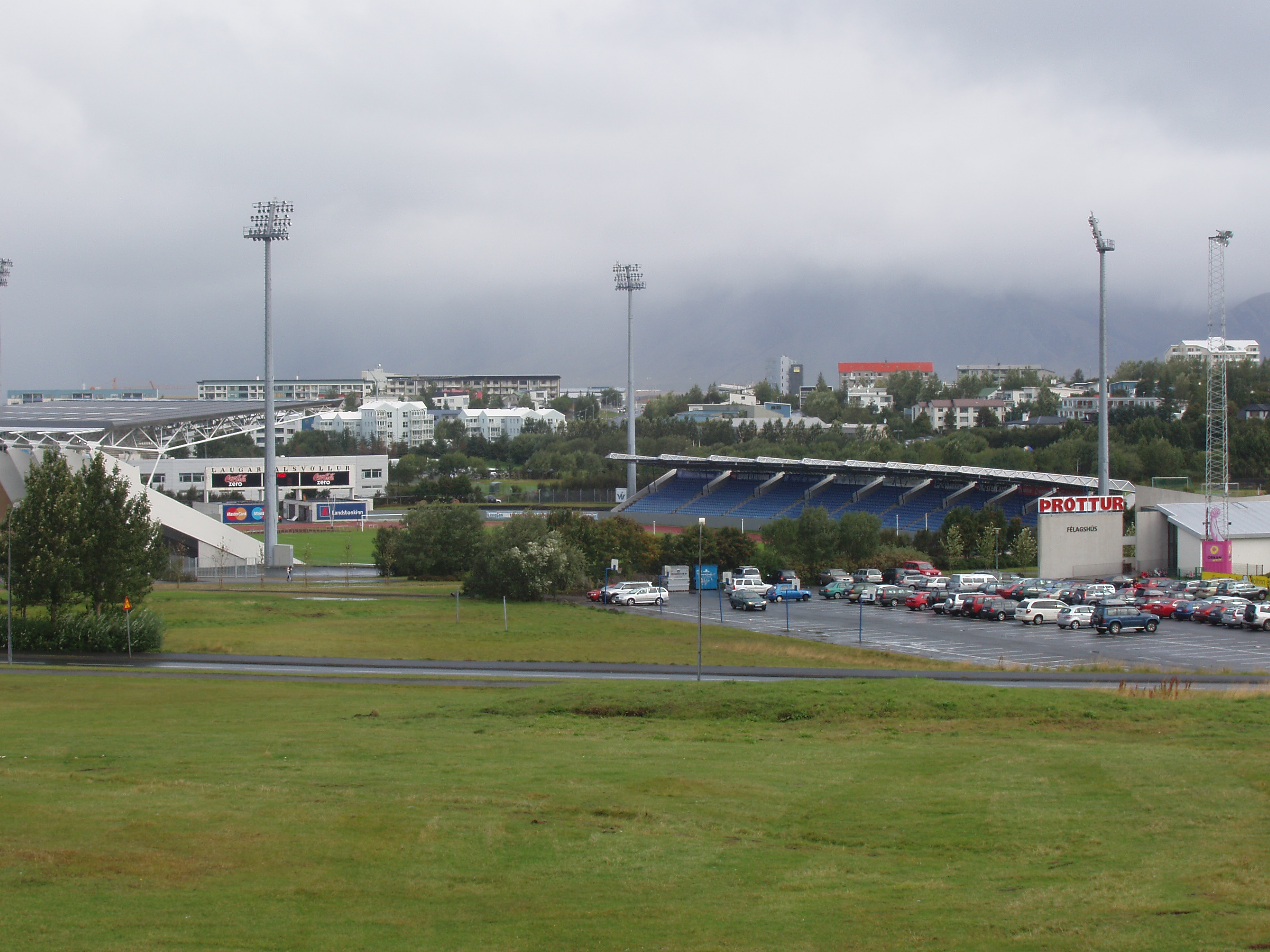
Laugardalsvöllur

== Supporters ==
=== Fram supporters ===
Often called "Geiramenn" and Framherjar, Before the foundation of Fram Reykjavík the dominant club in the Reykjavík area was KR, which was considered a middle class club, and in later years an upper class club,

Demand for Fram Reykjavík tickets in occasional home games held away from Reykjavík is high; suggesting that Fram Reykjavík have strong supports in other parts of the country.

== Youth program ==
=== Youth program ===
The Fram Reykjavík youth set-up has been recognized as one of the best in Iceland for producing young talents. While not all graduates made it to the first team, many have enjoyed successful careers in the Icelandic top flight. Under long-time coach Ásgeir Elíasson, the Fram youth squad enjoyed one of its successful periods, winning all age-group competitions, especially in the 70s, 80s and 90s. The youth system is also notable for its contribution to the Iceland national senior and youth teams, providing such players as Ríkharður Daðason, Pétur Marteinsson and Marteinn Geirsson, Eggert Jónsson, Guðmundur Torfason, Birkir Kristinsson, Hólmbert Friðjónsson, Pétur Ormslev, Valur Fannar Gíslason, which they had to sell to Arsenal F.C., Guðmundur Steinarsson, Jón Guðni Fjóluson, Hörður Björgvin Magnússon and Viktor Bjarki Daðason

== History of the shirts and its emblem ==
=== Colours of shirt and shorts ===
Fram Reykjavík has for almost 100 years played in Blue and White., Although the team originally played in white. For much of Frams's history, their home colours have been blue shirts, with white shorts and blue socks, though white socks are sometimes worn . For the first two years of the club's existence Fram Reykjavík continued to wear shirt, which included white shirt, white shorts and blue socks; this was changed to the more familiar Blue kit in The new colours were adopted because many clubs in the same division as Ithrottafelag Reykjavikur played also in white.

Fram play now in Erreà shirts, but the most famous one is the Adidas shirt they played in the 1980s which had slightly brighter version of blue color, but in 2000–2004 the played in Fila (company). since 2004 they have played in Erreà

=== Kit manufacturers and sponsors ===
Period	Kit manufacturer
1975–1996	Adidas
1996–2001	Fila
2001–present	Erreà

Period	Shirt sponsor (chest)
1975-1996	Sjóvá
1997-2000	Spar Verslun
2001-2007	Unknown
2008	TM
2009-2015	Sjóvá
2016-2019	KIA
2020-2023	GG Verk
2024-present	Michelsen

=== Fram crest: 1908— ===
From 1908 to now Fram Reykjavík has kept its good old crest which contains football from the early 1900s and old spells over it.

From 1908 The current design is blue and white with brownish football under the name, the football on the crest is very similar to the footballs that were used in Europe before the 1900s, echoing the club's home color of Blue in the background of it. The three stars were added above the convex and concave sections of Fram emblem to denote the eighteen championship titles they have won.

== Notable former players ==
Following players have represented Fram and either made at least 100 league appearances for the club, or made at least 10 appearances for their national team.

- (Denmark) Bo Henriksen
- (England) Sam Hewson
- (England) Sam Tillen
- (Faroe Islands) Fróði Benjaminsen
- (Iceland) Lárus Rúnar Grétarsson
- (Iceland) Ingvi Þór Hermannsson
- (Iceland) Ríkharður Daðason
- (Iceland) Arnljótur Davíðsson
- (Iceland) Jón Guðni Fjóluson
- (Iceland) Hólmbert Friðjónsson
- (Iceland) Marteinn Geirsson
- (Iceland) Valur Fannar Gíslason
- (Iceland) Janus Guðlaugsson
- (Iceland) Róbert Gunnarsson (Handball)
- (Iceland) Arnar Gunnlaugsson
- (Iceland) Björgvin Páll Gústavsson (Handball)
- (Iceland) Hannes Þór Halldórsson
- (Iceland) Auðun Helgason
- (Iceland) Björgólfur Hideaki Takefusa
- (Iceland) Ingimundur Ingimundarson (Handball)
- (Iceland) Sverre Andreas Jakobsson (Handball)
- (Iceland) Sæmundur Gíslason
- (Iceland) Ríkharður Jónsson
- (Iceland) Ögmundur Kristinsson
- (Iceland) Heiðar Geir Júlíusson
- (Iceland) Birkir Kristinsson
- (Iceland) Hörður Björgvin Magnússon
- (Iceland) Ragnar Margeirsson
- (Iceland) Pétur Ormslev
- (Iceland) Helgi Sigurðsson
- (Iceland) Guðmundur Steinarsson
- (Iceland) Guðmundur Steinsson
- (Iceland) Hjálmar Þórarinsson
- (Iceland) Friðþjófur Thorsteinsson
- (Iceland) Guðmundur Torfason
- (Russia) Oleg Titov (Handball)
- (Scotland) Jordan Halsman
- (Scotland) Steven Lennon
- (Scotland) Alan Lowing
- (United States) Cody Mizell

== Notable managers ==
- (Iceland) Guðmundur Halldórsson (1929–1932)
- (Norway) Reidar Sörensen (1933)
- (Iceland) Friðþjófur Thorsteinsson (1934–1936)
- (Norway) Reidar Sörensen (1937)
- (Denmark) Peter A. Petersen (1938)
- (Germany) Hermann Lindemann (1939)
- (Iceland) Friðþjófur Thorsteinsson (1940)
- (Iceland) Ólafur K. Þorvarðsson (1941–1942)
- (Iceland) Þráinn Sigurðsson (1943)
- (England) John J. Enwright (1944)
- (Iceland) Þráinn Sigurðsson (1945)
- (England) Mr. Linday (1945)
- (Scotland) James McCrae (1946–48)
- (Poland) Andrzej Strejlau (1982–83)
- (Iceland) Ásgeir Elíasson (1985–91)
- (Iceland) Ásgeir Sigurvinsson (1993)
- (Iceland) Ásgeir Elíasson (1996–99)
- (Iceland) Guðmundur Torfason (2000)
- (Romania) Ion Geolgău (2004)
- (Iceland) Ólafur Kristjánsson (Jan 2004 – 5 Dec)
- (Iceland) Ásgeir Elíasson (2006)
- (Iceland) Þorvaldur Örlygsson (1 January 2008 – 2 June 2013)
- (Iceland) Ríkharður Daðason (3 June 2013 – 9 October 2013)
- (Iceland) Pétur Pétursson (17 May 2015 – 31 December 2015)
- (Portugal) Pedro Hipólito (3 July 2017 – 31 December 2018)
- (Iceland) Guðmundur Guðmundsson (Handball)
- (Russia) Anatoli Fedyukin (Handball)

== European Cups statistics ==
Updated 29 July 2011

Competition	Matches	W	D	L	GF	GA
UEFA Champions League	8	0	2	6	4	28
UEFA Cup/Europa League	32	6	4	22	29	65

== European record ==
Season	Competition	Round	Club	Home	Away	Aggregate
1971–72	European Cup Winners Cup	PR	(Malta) Hibernians	2–0	0–3	2–3
1973–74	UEFA Champions League	1Q	(Switzerland) FC Basel	0–5	2–6	2–11
1974–75	UEFA Cup Winner's Cup	1Q	(Spain) Real Madrid	0–2	0–6	0–8
1976–77	UEFA Europa League	1Q	(Czechoslovakia) Slovan Bratislava	0–3	0–5	0–8
1976–77	UEFA Europa League	1Q	(Norway) Start Kristiansand	0–6	0–2	0–8
1979–80	UEFA Europa League	1Q	(Denmark) Hvidovre IF	0–1	0–2	0–3
1980–81	UEFA Europa League	1Q	(Republic of Ireland) Dundalk F.C.	2–1	0–4	2–5
1982–83	UEFA Europa League	1Q	(Republic of Ireland) Shamrock Rovers F.C.	0–3	0–4	0–7
1986–87	UEFA Europa League	1Q	(Poland) GKS Katowice	0–3	0–1	0–4
1987–88	UEFA Europa League	1Q	(Czech Republic) Sparta Prague	0–2	0–8	0–10
1988–89	UEFA Cup Winners' Cup	1Q	(Spain) FC Barcelona	0–2	0–5	0–7
1989–90	UEFA Champions League	1Q	(Romania) Steaua Bucharest	0–4	0–1	0–5
1990–91	UEFA Cup Winners' Cup	1Q	(Sweden) Djurgårdens IF Fotboll	3–0	1–1	4–1
1990–91	UEFA Cup Winners' Cup	2Q	(Spain) FC Barcelona	1–2	0–3	1–5
1991–92	UEFA Champions League	1Q	(Greece) Panathinaikos	2–2	0–0	2–2
1992–93	UEFA Europa League	1Q	(Germany) 1. FC Kaiserslautern	0–3	0–4	0–7
2009–10	UEFA Europa League	1Q	(Wales) The New Saints F.C.	2–1	2–1	4–2
2009–10	UEFA Europa League	2Q	(Czech Republic) Sigma Olomouc	0–2	1–1	1–3
2014–15	UEFA Europa League	1Q	(Estonia) Nõmme Kalju FC	0–1	2–2	2–3
2027–28	UEFA Conference League	1Q				

== Current squad (football) ==
As of 15 August 2025

== Honours, trophies and achievements ==
=== Football ===
- Icelandic Championships (18):
  - 1913, 1914, 1915, 1916, 1917, 1918, 1921, 1922, 1923, 1925, 1939, 1946, 1947, 1962, 1972, 1986, 1988, 1990
- Icelandic Cup (8):
  - 1970, 1973, 1979, 1980, 1985, 1987, 1989, 2013
- Icelandic Super Cup (6):
  - 1971, 1974, 1981, 1985, 1986, 1989
- First Division (tier 2): (5)
  - 1966, 1983, 1996, 2006, 2021

=== Handball ===
- Icelandic Championships (11):
  - 1950, 1962, 1963, 1964, 1966, 1967, 1970, 1972, 2006, 2013, 2025
- Icelandic Cup (2):
  - 2000, 2025
- Icelandic League Cup (1):
  - 2008

=== Basketball ===
- Icelandic First Division (4):
  - 1974–75, 1978–79, 1980–81, 1985–86
- Icelandic Second Division (1):
  - 1973–74
