= Bíldudalur =

- Village
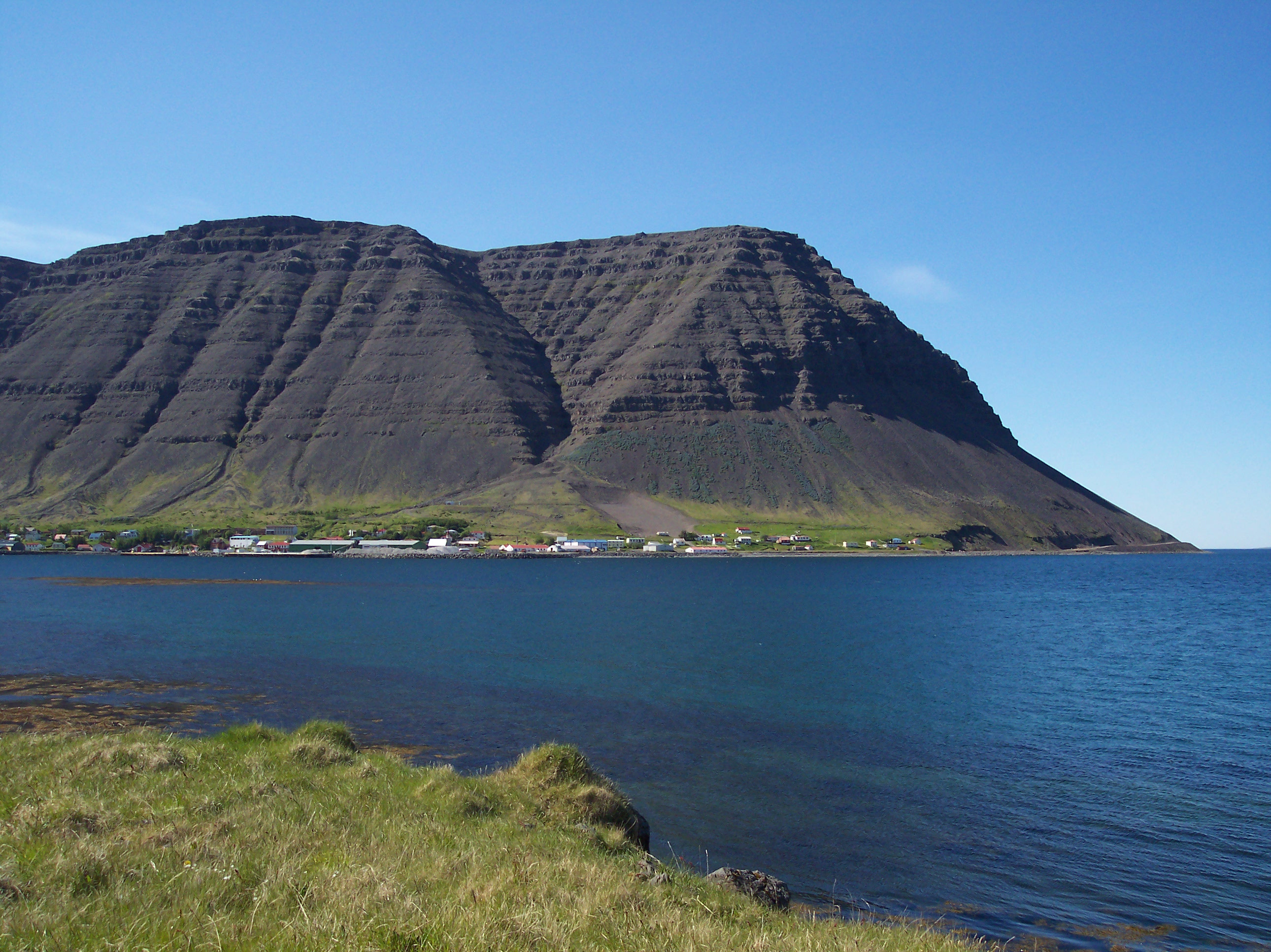
- Bíldudalur

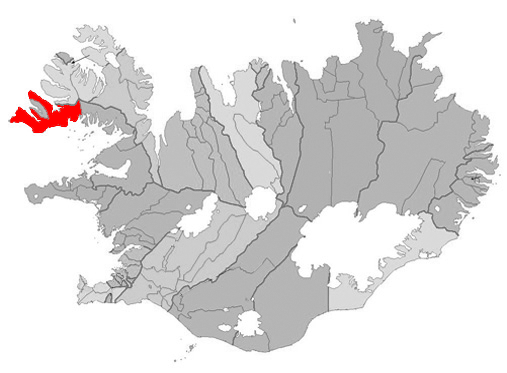
- Location of the Municipality of Vesturbyggð

- Location within Iceland
- Coordinates: 65°40′59″N 23°37′50″W
- Country: Iceland
- Constituency: Northwest Constituency
- Region: Westfjords
- Municipality: Vesturbyggð
- Elevation: 86 m (282 ft)

Population (2021)
  - Total: 238
- Time zone: UTC+0 (GMT)
- Póstnúmer: 465
- Website: Official website

Bíldudalur (Icelandic pronunciation: [ˈpiltʏˌtaːlʏr̥]) is a village situated on the coast of Arnarfjörður, one of the Westfjords in Iceland.

It is situated in the Vesturbyggð municipality and has 238 inhabitants (as of January 2021).

The village prospered in the 19th century thanks to sound business enterprise and the booming fishing industry. Ólafur Thorlacius (1761–1815) set up business in Bíldudalur following the end of the Danish trade monopoly. He was one of the most influential businessmen in Iceland at the beginning of the 19th century. He bought and sold fish, traded goods and ran his own small fishing fleet. One of his successors, Pétur J. Thorsteinsson (1854–1924) successfully continued this operation.

In the late 20th and early 21st centuries, the decline of the fishing industry and the imposition of strict quotas by the Icelandic government led the town to diversify its economy. The village is now home to a factory, which provides employment to many residents, processing a mineral-rich algae found in abundance in the fjord. The village is also becoming a popular tourist destination, especially for fishing trips and for artists seeking to gain inspiration from the spectacular scenery.

Close by the town there is also a fjord of literary significance, Geirþjófsfjörður, where the Icelandic Gísla saga was played out.

== Transport ==
The village and neighbouring area is served by Bíldudalur Airport.
