= Matthías Vilhjálmsson =

Icelandic footballer (born 1987)

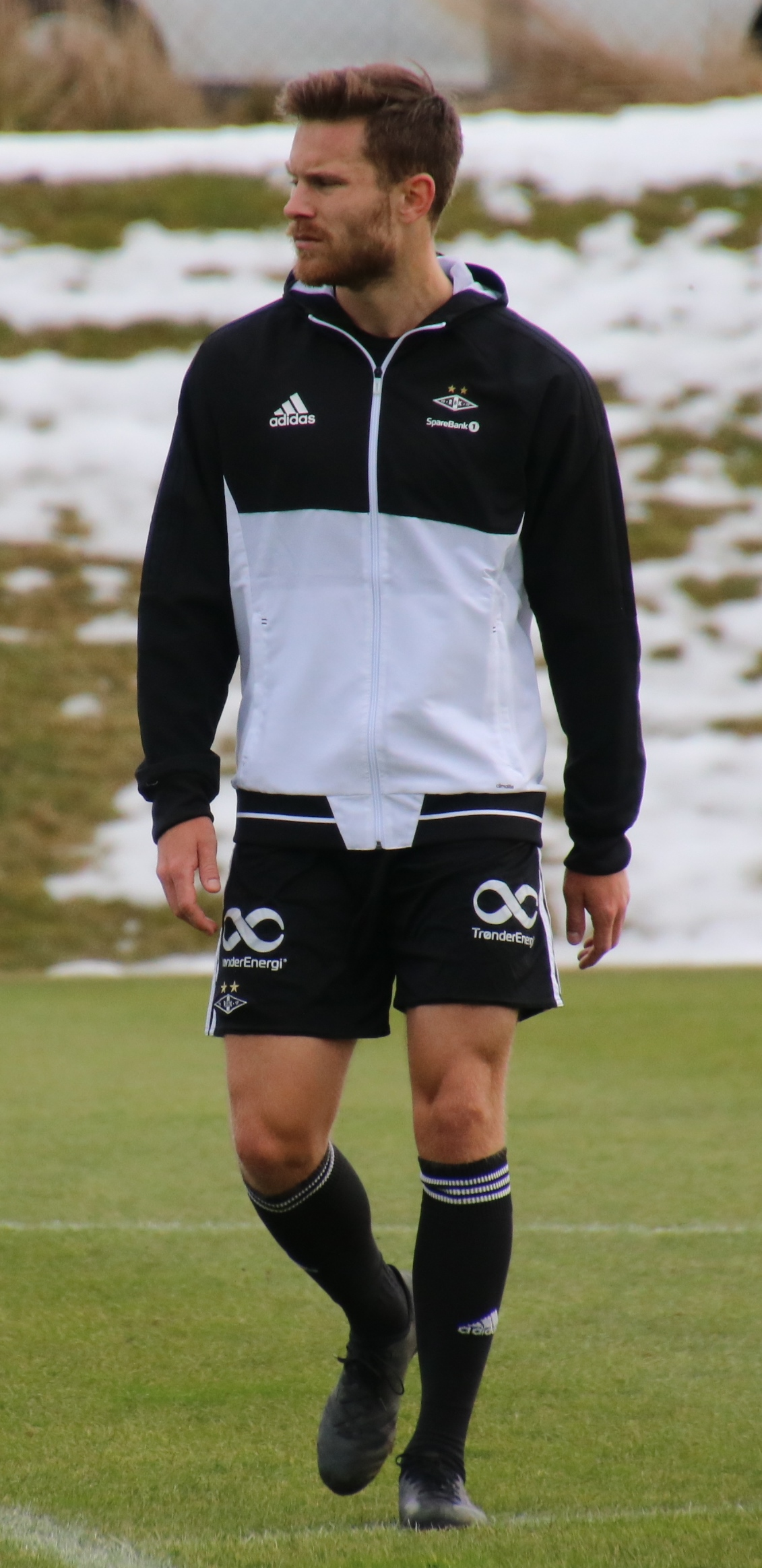

Personal information
- Full name: Matthías Vilhjálmsson
- Date of birth: 30 January 1987 (age 39)
- Place of birth: Reykjavík, Iceland
- Height: 1.86 m (6 ft 1 in)
- Position: Striker

Senior career*
Years	Team	Apps	(Gls)
2002–2003	BÍ	13	(5)
2004–2013	FH	115	(37)
2011	→ Colchester United (loan)	3	(0)
2012	→ Start (loan)	30	(18)
2013–2015	Start	66	(23)
2015–2019	Rosenborg	66	(14)
2019–2020	Vålerenga	57	(11)
2021–2023	FH	48	(16)
2023–2025	Víkingur	52	(8)

International career
2003–2004	Iceland U17	10	(3)
2005	Iceland U19	5	(1)
2006–2008	Iceland U21	8	(0)
2009–2016	Iceland	15	(2)
- * Club domestic league appearances and goals as of 25 October 2025

Matthías Vilhjálmsson (born 30 January 1987) is an Icelandic international footballer who plays as a striker for the Úrvalsdeild club Víkingur. He can as well play as a midfielder. He also played for the Icelandic national football team from 2009 to 2016.

Matthías, also known as Matti Vill, has previously played for the Icelandic clubs BÍ and FH, the English club Colchester United and the Norwegian club Start.

== Career ==
=== Early career ===
Matthías was born in Reykjavík and grew up in Ísafjörður where he played with BÍ until he was 17 years old. He moved to Hafnarfjörður in 2004 to play with FH where he enjoyed early success with the youth teams of FH, winning the cup in 2004 and also the double in 2005, which is the only group in the club who have won the double. Matthías made his first-team debut for FH at the age of 18 in the last match of the 2005 season. He came on as a substitute with 20 minutes were left in the game, after one minute he was awarded a penalty which the team's top goalscorer Tryggvi Guðmundsson converted to complete his hattrick.

Between 2006 and 2010, Matthías won five titles with his team, three league titles and two cups. In 2007, he was voted the best young player in the league by other players. The 2009 season also ended with a league title, and he had most assists in the league and was the player with sixth most goals despite playing as a midfielder or right back. In the spring of 2010 he became one of the youngest captains in the history of FH when he was selected as the club captain for the 2010 season by his manager Heimir Guðjónsson. The same season, Matthías was voted the best midfielder in the league by other players in a survey by the most popular football website in Iceland, www.fotbolti.net. The highlight of the season was when FH won the cup 4–0 against their rivals KR where Matthías scored first two goals from the penalty spot before lifting the trophy after the game.

=== England ===
Matthías joined Colchester United on trial in November 2010. He impressed the manager John Ward enough to earn a loan deal to the end of the season with the option of a permanent deal.

Matthías made his début as an 83rd-minute substitute in a 2–0 defeat against Brighton & Hove Albion where he replaced Dave Mooney, as the club went on to lose 3–0. Matthías made two more appearances for Colchester United, both coming on as a substitute. Due to lack of first team opportunities at the club, he asked Colchester United for his release, which was granted on 3 March 2011 and returned to Iceland.

=== Norway ===
Ahead of the 2012-season, Matthías joined Norwegian First Division club Start on a season-long loan-deal. He scored 18 goals for the team during the season, and became the top goalscorer in the 2012 Norwegian First Division when Start won promotion to Tippeligaen. Ahead of the 2012-season he joined Start on a permanent deal, and signed a two-year contract with the club.

On 25 July 2015, after weeks of speculations, Matthías signed for the Norwegian club Rosenborg on a two-and-a-half-year deal.

=== Return to Iceland ===
Matthías returned to Iceland and joined FH in 2021. In April 2023, he played his 400th match in the Icelandic top-tier league.

== Career statistics ==
=== Club ===
As of match played 25 October 2025

Appearances and goals by club, season and competition
Club	Season	League			National Cup		Europe		Other		Total	
Club	Season	Division	Apps	Goals	Apps	Goals	Apps	Goals	Apps	Goals	Apps	Goals
FH	2005	Úrvalsdeild	1	0	1	0	-		-		2	0
FH	2006	Úrvalsdeild	14	0	1	0	4	0	-		19	0
FH	2007	Úrvalsdeild	17	6	4	1	4	3	-		25	10
FH	2008	Úrvalsdeild	19	5	2	1	4	0	-		25	6
FH	2009	Úrvalsdeild	22	10	3	0	2	0	-		27	10
FH	2010	Úrvalsdeild	21	6	5	4	2	0	-		28	10
FH	2011	Úrvalsdeild	21	10	2	0	2	0	-		25	10
FH	Total		115	37	18	6	18	3	-	-	151	46
Colchester (loan)	2010–11	League One	3	0	0	0	-		-		3	0
Colchester (loan)	Total		3	0	0	0	-	-	-	-	3	0
Start (loan)	2012	Adeccoligaen	30	18	3	1	-		-		33	19
Start	2013	Tippeligaen	29	11	5	3	-		-		34	14
Start	2014	Tippeligaen	22	5	3	4	-		-		25	9
Start	2015	Tippeligaen	15	7	1	0	-		-		16	7
Start	Total		96	41	12	8	-	-	-	-	108	49
Rosenborg	2015	Tippeligaen	12	2	2	2	8	1	-		22	5
Rosenborg	2016	Tippeligaen	29	5	7	2	6	0	-		42	7
Rosenborg	2017	Eliteserien	18	7	5	8	6	1	1	0	30	16
Rosenborg	2018	Eliteserien	7	0	1	0	7	0	-		15	0
Rosenborg	Total		66	14	15	12	27	2	1	0	109	28
Vålerenga	2019	Eliteserien	28	5	2	3	-		-		30	8
Vålerenga	2020	Eliteserien	29	6	0	0	-		-		29	6
Vålerenga	Total		57	11	2	3	-	-	-	-	59	14
FH	2021	Úrvalsdeild	22	7	2	1	4	0	-		28	8
FH	2022	Úrvalsdeild	26	9	5	0	-		-		31	9
FH	Total		48	16	7	1	4	0	-	-	59	17
Víkingur	2023	Besta deild karla	21	5	3	1	2	0	-		26	6
Víkingur	2024	Besta deild karla	13	1	5	0	8	1	-		26	2
Víkingur	2025	Besta deild karla	18	2	1	0	-		-		19	2
Víkingur	Total		52	8	8	1	10	1	-	-	70	10
Career total			437	128	63	31	59	6	1	0	560	165

=== International goals ===
Scores and results list Iceland's goal tally first.

Goal	Date	Venue	Opponent	Score	Result	Competition
1.	21 March 2010	Kórinn, Kópavogur, Iceland	Faroe Islands	2–0	2–0	Friendly
2.	16 January 2015	UCF Soccer and Track Stadium, Orlando, United States	Canada	2–0	2–1	Friendly

== Honours ==
FH

- Úrvalsdeild: 2006, 2008, 2009
- Icelandic Men's Football Cup: 2007, 2010
- Icelandic League Cup: 2006, 2007, 2009, 2022
- Icelandic Super Cup: 2007, 2008, 2010

Rosenborg

- Tippeligaen/Eliteserien: 2015, 2016, 2017, 2018
- Norwegian Football Cup: 2015, 2016, 2018
- Mesterfinalen: 2017

Vikingur

- Besta deild karla: 2023, 2025
- Icelandic Men's Football Cup: 2023
- Icelandic Super Cup: 2024

=== Individual ===
- Norwegian Cup Top goalscorer: 2017
