= 2007 Icelandic Men's Football League Cup =

Deildarbikar karla

Tournament details
- Country: Iceland
- Teams: 16

Final positions
- Champions: FH
- Runners-up: Valur

The 2007 Icelandic Men's Football League Cup was the 12th staging of the Icelandic Men's League Cup, a pre-season professional football competition in Iceland. The competition started on 16 February 2007 and concluded on 1 May 2007 with FH beating Valur 3–2 in the final after extra time.

== Details ==
- The 16 teams were divided into 2 groups of 8 teams. Each team plays one match with other teams in the group once. The top 4 teams from each group qualified for the quarter-finals.

== Group stage ==
=== Group A ===
Pos	Team	Pld	W	D	L	GF	GA	GD	Pts	Qualification
1	FH (Q)	7	6	1	0	21	7	+14	19	Qualification to the Quarter-finals
2	Valur (Q)	7	5	0	2	15	5	+10	15	Qualification to the Quarter-finals
3	HK (Q)	7	3	2	2	6	8	−2	11	Qualification to the Quarter-finals
4	Víkingur Reykjavík (Q)	7	3	1	3	17	11	+6	10	Qualification to the Quarter-finals
5	Fylkir	7	3	1	3	14	13	+1	10	
6	Stjarnan	7	2	1	4	15	14	+1	7	
7	KA	7	1	1	5	6	21	−15	4	
8	Grindavík	7	1	1	5	5	20	−15	4	

Rules for classification: 1) points; 2) goal difference; 3) number of goals scored.
(Q) Qualified for the phase indicated

=== Group B ===
Pos	Team	Pld	W	D	L	GF	GA	GD	Pts	Qualification
1	Breiðablik (Q)	7	7	0	0	27	8	+19	21	Qualification to the Quarter-finals
2	KR (Q)	7	6	0	1	15	5	+10	18	Qualification to the Quarter-finals
3	Keflavík (Q)	7	3	1	3	19	6	+13	10	Qualification to the Quarter-finals
4	Fram (Q)	7	3	1	3	14	12	+2	10	Qualification to the Quarter-finals
5	ÍBV	7	2	1	4	8	13	−5	7	
6	ÍA	7	2	1	4	10	20	−10	7	
7	Fjölnir	7	1	2	4	11	17	−6	5	
8	Þróttur	7	1	0	6	11	24	−13	3	

Rules for classification: 1) points; 2) goal difference; 3) number of goals scored.
(Q) Qualified for the phase indicated

== Knockout stage ==
=== Quarter-finals ===
23 April 2007

FH	3–1	Fram
Vilhjalmsson, Gudnason		Gardarsson

Kaplakriki, Hafnarfjörður

23 April 2007

Valur	3–1	Keflavík
Thorarinsson 39'; Sigurdsson 60'; Saevarsson 90+1'		Sigurdsson 15'

Vodafonevöllurinn, Reykjavík

23 April 2007

KR	1–1 (a.e.t.)	HK
Thorhallsson 3'		Stefansson 39'
Penalties
	7–8

KR-völlur, Reykjavík

23 April 2007

Breiðablik	1–2	Víkingur Reykjavík
Sigurdsson 26'		Sveinbjornsson 67'; Atlasonn 87'

Kópavogsvöllur, Kópavogur

=== Semi-finals ===
27 April 2007

Víkingur Reykjavík	0–1	Valur
		Saevarsson 89'

Reykjavík

27 April 2007

FH	4–1	HK
Olafsson 9', 62'; Vidarsson 52'; Gudnason 83'		Jaeger 55'

Kaplakriki, Hafnarfjörður

=== Final ===
1 May 2007

FH	3–2 (a.e.t.)	Valur
Gunnlaugsson 50'; Dyring 99'; Gudnason 115'		Hjaltason 76', 120'; Hreidarsson (penalty missed)

Garðabær
Referee: Egill Mar Markusson

FH:
GK	(Iceland) Dadi Larusson
DF	(Iceland) Heimir Snaer Gudmundsson
DF	(Iceland) Sverrir Gardarsson
DF	(Denmark) Tommy Nielsen
DF	(Iceland) Hjortur Logi Valgardsson
MF	(Denmark) David Thor Vidarsson
MF	(Iceland) Sigurvin Olafsson		(substituted off) 71'
MF	(Iceland) Bjarki Gunnlaugsson		(substituted off) 75'
MF	(Iceland) Matthias Vilhjalmsson		(substituted off) 71'
FW	(Iceland) Matthias Gudmundsson		(substituted off) 108'
FW	(Iceland) Tryggvi Gudmundsson
Substitutes:
MF	(Iceland) Dennis Siim		(substituted on) 71'
FW	(Iceland) Atli Gudnason		(substituted on) 71'
MF	(Denmark) Allan Dyring	(red card) 118'	(substituted on) 75'
MF	(Iceland) Olafur Pall Snorrason		(substituted on) 108'
Manager:
(Iceland) Olafur David Johannesson

VALUR:
GK		(Iceland) Sigurdur Sigurdsson
DF		(Iceland) Birkir Mar Saevarsson
DF		(Iceland) Gunnar Einarsson
DF		(Iceland) Atli Sveinn Þórarinsson
DF		(Iceland) Rene Carlsen
MF		(Iceland) Baldur Bett	(substituted off) 106'
MF		(Iceland) Palmi Rafn Palmason	(substituted off) 96'
MF		(Iceland) Baldur Ingimar Adalsteinsson
MF		(Iceland) Sigurbjorn Orn Hreidarsson	(substituted off) 59'
FW		(Iceland) Gudmundur Benediktsson	(substituted off) 59'
FW		(Iceland) Helgi Sigurdsson	(substituted off) 46'
Substitutes:
FW		(Iceland) Daniel Hjaltason	(substituted on) 46'
FW		(Iceland) Hafthor Aegir Vilhjalmsson	(substituted on) 59'
FW	(Denmark)	Denins Bo Mortensen	(substituted on) 59'
MF	(Iceland)	Orn Kato Hauksson	(substituted on) 96'
FW	(Iceland)	Kristin Haflidason	(substituted on) 106'
Manager:
(Iceland) Willum Thor Thorsson

== See also ==
- Icelandic Men's Football Cup
- Knattspyrnusamband Íslands - The Icelandic Football Association
- Icelandic First Division League 2007
