= Heimir Guðjónsson (footballer, born 1969) =

Icelandic footballer and manager

Personal information
- Date of birth: 4 March 1969 (age 57)
- Place of birth: Iceland
- Height: 1.87 m (6 ft 2 in)
- Position: Midfielder

Senior career*
Years	Team	Apps	(Gls)
1986–1989	KR	20	(7)
1990	KA	16	(0)
1991–1997	KR	119	(10)
1998–1999	ÍA	33	(1)
2000–2005	FH	97	(4)
Total		269	(22)

International career
1983–1985	Iceland U17	12	(0)
1995	Iceland U19	4	(1)
1989	Iceland U21	2	(0)
1996–1997	Iceland	6	(0)

Managerial career
- 2005–2008: FH (assistant)
- 2008–2017: FH
- 2017–2019: Havnar Bóltfelag
- 2019–2022: Valur
- 2022–2025: FH
- 2025–: Fylkir
- * Club domestic league appearances and goals

Heimir Guðjónsson (born 3 April 1969) is an Icelandic football manager and a former player, currently managing Fylkir. As a player, he was deployed in midfield and represented the Iceland national team. As a manager, he won the Icelandic championship five times with Fimleikafélag Hafnarfjarðar.

== Playing career ==
Heimir played his first senior game as a member of Knattspyrnufélag Reykjavíkur in 1986. He won the Icelandic championship as a member of FH in 2004 and 2005.

== Managerial career ==
Heimir was hired as an assistant manager to FH on 21 September 2005. On 10 October 2007, he took over as manager of FH after Ólafur Jóhannesson resigned and won the Icelandic championship in 2008 and 2009. He won the Icelandic Cup in 2010 and the Icelandic championship again in 2012, 2015 and 2016. For his first nine seasons at the helm, FH finished either first or second in the Úrvalsdeild karla. He was sacked following the 2017 season after the team finished third in the league.

In November 2017, Heimir was hired as the manager of Havnar Bóltfelag. On 23 September he won the Faroe Islands Premier League with HB after defeating second placed KÍ 2–1. With the victory, no team could catch HB even with four matches remaining. After the season he was named the Faroe Islands Coach of the Year. In 2019, he led HB to victory in the Faroese Super Cup and the Faroese Cup.

In 2019, he took over as the manager of Valur and led them to the 2020 championship. In July 2022, he was fired as manager after a rough start of the season.

== Managerial statistics ==
Team	Nation	From	To	Record							
Team	Nation	From	To	G	W	D	L	F	A	Gd	Win %
FH	Iceland	10 October 2007	31 September 2017	365	226	59	78	767	414	+353	61.92
HB	Faroe Islands	November 2017	1 December 2019	69	48	10	11	153	59	+94	69.57
Valur	Iceland	2 December 2019	Present	60	35	8	17	118	75	+43	60.34
Total				494	309	77	106	1,038	548	+490	62.8

As of 11 July 2022

== Honours and achievements ==
=== Player ===
==== Club ====
FH

- Icelandic Champion: 2004, 2005
- Icelandic League Cups: 2002, 2004
- Icelandic Super Cup: 2004
- 1. deild karla: 2000

KA

- Icelandic Super Cup: 1990

KR

- Icelandic Cup: 1994, 1995

=== Manager ===
==== Club ====
FH

- Icelandic Champion: 2006^{1}, 2008, 2009, 2012, 2015, 2016
- Icelandic Cup: 2007^{1}, 2010
- Icelandic League Cups: 2006^{1}, 2007^{1}, 2009, 2014
- Icelandic Super Cup: 2006^{1}, 2008, 2009, 2010, 2013

^{1} Assistant manager

Havnar Bóltfelag

- Faroese Champion: 2018
- Faroe Islands Coach of the Year: 2018
- Faroe Islands Super Cup: 2019
- Faroe Islands Cup: 2019

Valur

- Icelandic Champion: 2020

Fylkir

- Icelandic League Cups: 2026

== See also ==
- List of Iceland international footballers
