= 2008 Icelandic Men's Football League Cup =

2008 Deildabikar
Tournament details
- Country: Iceland
- Teams: 24

Final positions
- Champions: Valur
- Runners-up: Fram

The 2008 Icelandic Men's Football League Cup was the 13th season of the Icelandic Men's League Cup, a pre-season professional football competition in Iceland. The competition started on 22 February 2008 and concluded on 1 May 2008. Valur beat Fram 4–1 in the final to win their first League Cup title.

The 24 teams were divided into 4 groups of 6 teams. Every team played every other team of its group once, either home or away. Top 2 teams from each group qualified for the quarter-finals.

== Group stage ==
The games were played from 22 February to 15 April 2008.

=== Group 1 ===
| Pos | Team | Pld | W | D | L | GF | GA | GD | Pts | Qualification | VAL | BRE | GRI | ÍBV | SEL | VÓL |
|---|---|---|---|---|---|---|---|---|---|---|---|---|---|---|---|---|
| 1 | Valur (Q) | 5 | 5 | 0 | 0 | 19 | 5 | +14 | 15 | Qualification to the Quarter-finals | — | 2–1 | — | 6–0 | — | 3–1 |
| 2 | Breiðablik (Q) | 5 | 4 | 0 | 1 | 19 | 4 | +15 | 12 | Qualification to the Quarter-finals | — | — | — | — | 4–1 | 2–0 |
| 3 | Grindavík | 5 | 2 | 1 | 2 | 7 | 11 | −4 | 7 | | 1–4 | 1–5 | — | 1–0 | — | — |
| 4 | ÍBV | 5 | 1 | 1 | 3 | 6 | 19 | −13 | 4 | | — | 0–7 | — | — | 4–3 | — |
| 5 | Selfoss | 5 | 0 | 2 | 3 | 8 | 14 | −6 | 2 | | 2–4 | — | 1–1 | — | — | — |
| 6 | Víkingur Ólafsvík | 5 | 0 | 2 | 3 | 5 | 11 | −6 | 2 | | — | — | 1–3 | 2–2 | 1–1 | — |

Source: rsssf.org
Rules for classification: 1) points; 2) goal difference; 3) number of goals scored.
(Q) Qualified for the phase indicated

=== Group 2 ===
| Pos | Team | Pld | W | D | L | GF | GA | GD | Pts | Qualification | KR | FH | LRE | FJÖ | VÍK | ÞÓR |
|---|---|---|---|---|---|---|---|---|---|---|---|---|---|---|---|---|
| 1 | KR (Q) | 5 | 5 | 0 | 0 | 16 | 4 | +12 | 15 | Qualification to the Quarter-finals | — | 2–0 | — | — | 4–0 | — |
| 2 | FH (Q) | 5 | 4 | 0 | 1 | 19 | 5 | +14 | 12 | Qualification to the Quarter-finals | — | — | 7–1 | 4–0 | 5–0 | — |
| 3 | Leiknir R. | 5 | 2 | 1 | 2 | 9 | 15 | −6 | 7 | | 1–3 | — | — | 4–3 | — | 1–1 |
| 4 | Fjölnir | 5 | 1 | 1 | 3 | 11 | 15 | −4 | 4 | | 2–3 | — | — | — | 1–1 | — |
| 5 | Víkingur Reykjavík | 5 | 1 | 1 | 3 | 6 | 14 | −8 | 4 | | — | — | 1–2 | — | — | 4–2 |
| 6 | Þór A. | 5 | 0 | 1 | 4 | 9 | 17 | −8 | 1 | | 1–4 | 2–3 | — | 3–5 | — | — |

Source: rsssf.org
Rules for classification: 1) points; 2) goal difference; 3) number of goals scored.
(Q) Qualified for the phase indicated

=== Group 3 ===
| Pos | Team | Pld | W | D | L | GF | GA | GD | Pts | Qualification | FRA | ÍA | KAK | ÞRÓ | HAU | KSL |
|---|---|---|---|---|---|---|---|---|---|---|---|---|---|---|---|---|
| 1 | Fram (Q) | 5 | 4 | 1 | 0 | 10 | 2 | +8 | 13 | Qualification to the Quarter-finals | — | 2–1 | — | — | 4–0 | — |
| 2 | ÍA (Q) | 5 | 4 | 0 | 1 | 9 | 4 | +5 | 12 | Qualification to the Quarter-finals | — | — | 2–1 | — | 2–0 | 2–0 |
| 3 | KA | 5 | 2 | 1 | 2 | 13 | 9 | +4 | 7 | | 1–1 | — | — | 1–0 | — | 7–1 |
| 4 | Þróttur Reykjavík | 5 | 2 | 0 | 3 | 7 | 5 | +2 | 6 | | 0–1 | 1–2 | — | — | 3–0 | — |
| 5 | Haukar | 5 | 2 | 0 | 3 | 7 | 13 | −6 | 6 | | — | — | 5–3 | — | — | 2–1 |
| 6 | KS/Leiftur | 5 | 0 | 0 | 5 | 3 | 16 | −13 | 0 | | 0–2 | — | — | 1–3 | — | — |

Source: rsssf.org
Rules for classification: 1) points; 2) goal difference; 3) number of goals scored.
(Q) Qualified for the phase indicated

=== Group 4 ===
| Pos | Team | Pld | W | D | L | GF | GA | GD | Pts | Qualification | HK | KEF | FYL | KFF | NJA | STJ |
|---|---|---|---|---|---|---|---|---|---|---|---|---|---|---|---|---|
| 1 | HK (Q) | 5 | 4 | 1 | 0 | 9 | 4 | +5 | 13 | Qualification to the Quarter-finals | — | — | 1–0 | — | 1–0 | — |
| 2 | Keflavík (Q) | 5 | 3 | 0 | 2 | 12 | 10 | +2 | 9 | Qualification to the Quarter-finals | 2–4 | — | — | — | — | 3–1 |
| 3 | Fylkir | 5 | 2 | 1 | 2 | 9 | 8 | +1 | 7 | | — | 3–4 | — | — | 0–0 | 3–1 |
| 4 | Fjarðabyggð | 5 | 1 | 3 | 1 | 8 | 8 | 0 | 6 | | 1–1 | 2–1 | 2–3 | — | — | — |
| 5 | Njarðvík | 5 | 1 | 2 | 2 | 4 | 5 | −1 | 5 | | — | 0–2 | — | 1–1 | — | — |
| 6 | Stjarnan | 5 | 0 | 1 | 4 | 6 | 13 | −7 | 1 | | 1–2 | — | — | 2–2 | 1–3 | — |

Source: rsssf.org
Rules for classification: 1) points; 2) goal difference; 3) number of goals scored.
(Q) Qualified for the phase indicated

== Knockout stage ==
=== Quarter-finals ===
18 April 2008

| Valur | 2–0 | Keflavík |
|---|---|---|
| Pálmason 20'; Mortensen 79' |

Vodafonevöllurinn, Reykjavík

18 April 2008

| HK | 1–1 (a.e.t.) | Breiðablik |
|---|---|---|
| Þórsson 16' | | Grétarsson 74' |
Penalties
| | 3–5 |

Kópavogsvöllur, Kópavogur

19 April 2008

| Fram | 2–1 | FH |
|---|---|---|
| McShane 16'; H. Þórarinsson 56' | | Vilhjálmsson 68' |

Laugardalsvöllur, Reykjavík

19 April 2008

| KR | 0–3 | ÍA |
|---|---|---|
| | | Guðjónsson 1'; Sigurðarson 44'; 77' (o.g.) |

KR-völlur, Reykjavík

=== Semi-finals ===
24 April 2008

| Valur | 5–2 | ÍA |
|---|---|---|
| Pálmason 51' (pen.), 62'; Mortensen 70', 84'; Hjaltason 90' | | Guðjónsson 18' (pen.); Magnússon 69' |

Vodafonevöllurinn, Reykjavík

24 April 2008

| Fram | 2–2 (a.e.t.) | Breiðablik |
|---|---|---|
| Grímsson 102'; Júlíusson 114' | | Rajcomar 95', 111' (pen.) |
Penalties
| | 4–2 |

Laugardalsvöllur, Reykjavík

=== Final ===
1 May 2008

| Valur | 4–1 | Fram |
|---|---|---|
| Mortensen 4', 29'; A. S. Þórarinsson 50'; Pálmason 90' | | H. Þórarinsson 33' (pen.) |

Kópavogsvöllur, Kópavogur]
Referee: Eyjolfur M. Kristinsson

VALUR:
| GK | (Iceland) Kjartan Sturluson |
| DF | (Iceland) Birkir Már Sævarsson |
| DF | (Iceland) Gunnar Einarsson |
| DF | (Iceland) Atli Sveinn Þórarinsson |
| DF | (Iceland) Bjarni Ólafur Eiríksson |
| DF | (Denmark) Rene Skovgaard Carlsen |
| MF | (Iceland) Pálmi Rafn Pálmason |
| MF | (Iceland) Baldur Bett |
| FW | (Iceland) Daníel Hjaltason | (substituted off) 82' |
| FW | (Iceland) Guðmundur Benediktsson | (substituted off) 68' |
| FW | (Denmark) Dennis Bo Mortensen |
Substitutes:
| MF | (Iceland) Sigurbjörn Örn Hreiðarsson | (substituted on) 82' |
| FW | (Iceland) Hafþór Ægir Vilhjálmsson | (substituted on) 68' |
Manager:
(Iceland) Willum Þór Þórsson

FRAM:
| GK | (Iceland) Hannes Þór Halldórsson |
| DF | (Iceland) Óðinn Árnason |
| DF | (Iceland) Reynir Leósson |
| DF | (England) Sam Tillen |
| MF | (Iceland) Daði Guðmundsson |
| MF | (Scotland) Paul McShane | (substituted off) 89' |
| MF | (Iceland) Halldór Hermann Jónsson |
| FW | (Iceland) Heiðar Geir Júlíusson |
| FW | (Iceland) Grímur Björn Grímsson | (substituted off) 38' |
| FW | (Iceland) Hjálmar Þórarinsson |
| FW | (Iceland) Ívar Björnsson | (substituted off) 81' |
Substitutes:
| MF | (Iceland) Jón Orri Ólafsson | (substituted on) 38' |
| FW | (Iceland) Guðmundur Magnússon | (substituted on) 81' |
| DF | (Iceland) Kristinn Ingi Halldórsson | (substituted on) 89' |
Manager:
(Iceland) Þorvaldur Örlygsson

== Top goalscorers ==
10 goals

- (Iceland) Tryggvi Guðmundsson (FH)

7 goals

- (Denmark) Dennis Bo Mortensen (Valur)

6 goals

- (Iceland) Almarr Ormarsson (KA)
- (Iceland) Helgi Sigurðsson (Valur)

5 goals

- (Curaçao) Prince Rajcomar (Breiðablik)
- (Iceland) Björgólfur Hideaki Takefusa (KR)
- (Iceland) Gudjon Baldvinsson (KR)
- (Iceland) Daníel Hjaltason (Valur)
- (Iceland) Pálmi Rafn Pálmason (Valur)

4 goals

- (Iceland) Andri Steinn Birgisson (Grindavík)
- (Sweden) Patrik Redo (Keflavík)
- (Iceland) Alfred Elias Johannsson (Víkingur Ólafsvík)
