= Atli Guðnason =

Icelandic footballer

Personal information
- Full name: Atli Guðnason
- Date of birth: 28 September 1984 (age 42)
- Place of birth: Iceland
- Position: Striker

Team information
- Current team: FH
- Number: 11

Senior career*
Years	Team	Apps	(Gls)
2004–2020	FH	285	(67)
2004	→ HK (loan)	8	(3)
2005	→ Fjölnir (loan)	18	(10)

International career^{‡}
2009–2010	Iceland	3	(0)
- * Club domestic league appearances and goals as of 8 January 2021 ‡ National team caps and goals as of 8 January 2021

Atli Guðnason (born 28 September 1984) is a former Icelandic footballer who played as a winger or a striker.

== Club career ==
He made his first team debut for FH in 2004, establishing himself in the side in the 2006 season after spending some time on loan in Iceland's second highest division. He was part of the league-winning sides of 2006, 2008 and 2009, scoring 10 goals in 20 games in the 2009 season, making him the fifth-highest scoring player that season. In addition he won the national cup with FH in 2007 and 2010, so that he won a trophy in his first five full seasons with FH, in addition playing a single league game when the club won the league for the first time in 2004.

In 2012 Atli played well and finished as the top scorer in the Icelandic league, with 12 goals, also topping the assist charts with 13 assists. Atli won his fourth league title with FH that season with three games still to go.

== International career ==
After a good 2009 season Atli was selected for three international friendlies in the Icelandic off-season, playing the first half in a 1–0 loss to Iran in November 2009 and coming on as a late substitute in a 2–0 victory against the Faroe Islands and a 0–0 draw against Mexico in March 2010. In the March games Iceland featured mostly players playing in Iceland, with players in Europe unavailable. Atli had not appeared for the youth teams of Iceland, so these were his first international games.

== Career statistics ==
As of 4 October 2014

Club	Season	League		Cup		League Cup		Europe		Icelandic Super Cup		Total	
Club	Season	Apps	Goals	Apps	Goals	Apps	Goals	Apps	Goals	Apps	Goals	Apps	Goals
FH U23	2002	0	0	3	0	–	–	–	–	-	-	3	0
FH U23	Total	-	-	3	0	–	–	–	–	-	-	3	0
HK (loan)	2004	8	3	2	0	0	0	–	–	-	-	10	3
HK (loan)	Total	8	3	2	0	0	0	–	–	-	-	10	3
FH	2004	1	0	1	3	4	1	0	0	-	-	6	4
FH	2005	0	0	0	0	1	0	0	0	0	0	1	0
Fjölnir (loan)	2005	18	10	2	3	6	5	-	-	-	-	26	18
Fjölnir (loan)	Total	18	10	2	3	6	5	0	0	0	0	26	18
FH	2006	15	3	1	0	6	1	4	2	1	0	27	6
FH	2007	14	1	4	1	10	6	2	0	0	0	30	8
FH	2008	22	4	1	0	6	1	4	2	1	0	34	7
FH	2009	20	10	3	2	6	2	2	0	1	0	32	14
FH	2010	20	2	5	2	6	5	2	0	0	0	33	9
FH	2011	21	5	1	0	5	1	2	0	1	0	30	6
FH	2012	22	12	1	0	7	3	4	2	1	0	35	17
FH	2013	21	5	2	0	7	6	5	0	1	1	36	12
FH	2014	22	10	1	0	10	1	6	4	-	-	39	15
FH	Total	178	52	20	8	68	27	31	10	6	1	303	98
Career total		204	65	27	11	74	32	31	10	6	1	342	119

== Honours ==
=== Club ===
FH

- Icelandic Premier Division: 2006, 2008, 2009, 2012
- Icelandic Cup: 2007, 2010
- Icelandic League Cup: 2004, 2006, 2007, 2009, 2014
- Icelandic Super Cup: 2009, 2011
