= Heimir Hallgrímsson =

Icelandic footballer and coach (born 1967)

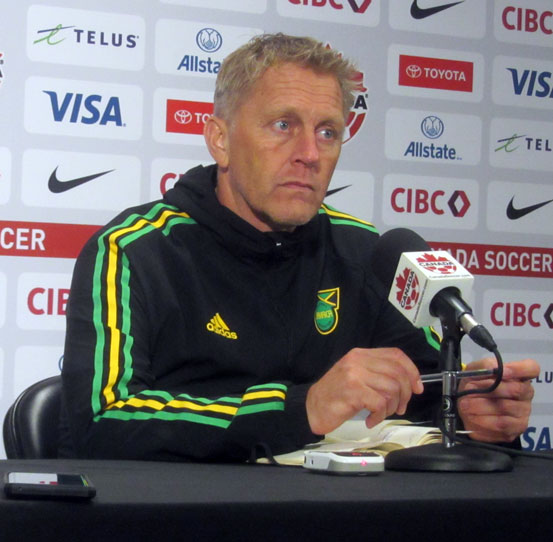
- Heimir with Jamaica in 2023

Personal information
- Full name: Heimir Hallgrímsson
- Date of birth: 10 June 1967 (age 59)
- Place of birth: Vestmannaeyjar, Iceland
- Position: Defender

Team information
- Current team: Republic of Ireland (head coach)

Senior career*
| Years | Team | Apps | (Gls) |
| 1986–1992 | ÍBV | 93 | (0) |
| 1993 | Höttur | 17 | (3) |
| 1994–1996 | ÍBV | 26 | (0) |
| 1996–1997 | Smástund | 20 | (10) |
| 1998–2007 | KFS | 48 | (10) |
| Total | | 204 | (23) |

Managerial career
- 1993: Höttur (women's)
- 1999–2001: ÍBV (women's)
- 2002: ÍBV (men's)
- 2003–2004: ÍBV (women's)
- 2006–2011: ÍBV (men's)
- 2013–2018: Iceland
- 2018–2021: Al-Arabi
- 2022–2024: Jamaica
- 2024–: Republic of Ireland
Medal record
Men's football
Representing Iceland (as manager)
China Cup
| Runner-up | 2017 Nanning |
Representing Jamaica (as manager)
CONCACAF Nations League
| Bronze medal – third place | 2024 United States |
- * Club domestic league appearances and goals

Heimir Hallgrímsson (born 10 June 1967) is an Icelandic professional football manager, former player, and dentist who is the current manager of the Republic of Ireland national football team.

He played football for amateur, semi-professional, and lower-tier regional football clubs. He then coached amateur clubs, Iceland, Al-Arabi in Qatar, and Jamaica, prior to Ireland.

== Early life ==
Heimir was born on 10 June 1967, and grew up in a family of six children on the island of Heimaey. His father ran a business repairing fishing nets. Heimir originally studied computer science at Reykjavík University with the aim of becoming a software engineer, but later qualified in dentistry, and worked as a dentist in Heimaey.

== Career ==
Heimir played for amateur, semi-professional, and lower-tier regional football clubs. He started playing for the men's football department of the ÍBV multi-sport club from his local town Vestmannaeyjar in 1986. He played with them until 1996 except for the 1993 season in which he played for the Höttur sports club in Iceland while managing their women's team. From 1996 until 2007 he played lower league football with another club from Vestmannaeyjar, from 1996 to 1997 he played with Smástund and from 1998 with KFS, the merged team of Smástund and another lower league team from Vestmannaeyjar called Framherjar. From 2002 to 2007 his appearances were sporadic.

Throughout his playing career, he also served as the dentist for his village, and even after taking reign over the Icelandic national team after Euro 2016. In the summer of 2016, he cared for a player who had a tooth knocked out at a local women's game he was attending, going on the pitch and putting the tooth back in place, and then making the tooth repair at his dental office.

== Coaching career ==
=== Club ===
In 1993, while playing with the men's senior team of Höttur, he coached their women's team; the team came first in the second tier and achieved promotion. While working as a dentist in Vestmannaeyjar, he started coaching the town's women's senior team, ÍBV, guiding them towards the top of the Icelandic women's Premier league, gaining places in the table each year. In 2002, he was hired as assistant coach for the men's team of ÍBV, and was their coach for the last games of the season after the previous coach was dismissed; the team finished 7th. In 2003, he again took over the women's team, guiding them to two 2nd-place finishes in the league and two cup finals, with ÍBV winning the second one in 2004.

He did not coach any club in 2005, but again took over as the coach for the ÍBV men's team mid-season in 2006, managing the team in the last 6 matches. He failed to prevent relegation; the team came in 10th. He remained this time as coach and the team was promoted in the 2008 season. They finished 10th out of 12 in the top division in 2009 but achieved two 3rd-place finishes in a row in 2010 and 2011.

=== Iceland ===
On 14 October 2011, KSÍ appointed Heimir as assistant coach of the Iceland national football team alongside Lars Lagerbäck as coach. Iceland qualified for the play-off stage of the 2014 FIFA World Cup qualification. However, Iceland lost there to Croatia.

Heimir faced media and fan skepticism regarding his professional credentials due to his dual career as a practicing dentist. He continued working as a dentist even after joining the national team as an assistant and eventual joint manager.

Iceland reached their first major tournament by qualifying for Euro 2016. In the tournament finals, Iceland recorded 1–1 draws in their first two group stage matches against Portugal and Hungary. They then advanced from their group with a 2–1 victory against Austria. Iceland qualified for the tournament's quarter-finals after a 2–1 upset win over England in the Round of 16, which led to England manager Roy Hodgson resigning immediately after the final whistle. However, they were eliminated by host nation France in the quarter-finals, 5–2.

After Euro 2016, he became the sole coach of Iceland, with Lagerbäck becoming coach of Norway. Iceland qualified for the 2018 World Cup, their first ever appearance in the world championship and their second major tournament overall. Iceland were drawn to play Croatia, Argentina, and Nigeria in a group that was considered by some as the "group of death", in which Iceland did not do well. Despite a challenging group, Iceland were tipped to advance from the group by some journalist websites, based on their performance in Euro 2016. Their maiden match at the World Cup was against 2014 runners-up Argentina, with Iceland holding Argentina to a 1–1 draw. However, their chances of advancing from the group were hurt following a 2–0 loss to Nigeria, with several missed opportunities in the first half and a penalty kick in the second half missed by Gylfi Sigurðsson, putting Iceland in position to play a decisive match against already qualified Croatia. Iceland lost to Croatia in their final group game and were eliminated. Iceland finished at the bottom of the group with a single point.

Heimir resigned on 17 July 2018 after the team's group-stage exit at World Cup.

=== Al-Arabi ===
On 10 December 2018, Heimir was hired as head coach for Al-Arabi in Qatar. His contract was for 2 1/2 years or until summer of 2021. His teams came in 6th, 7th, and 6th in the QNB Stars League.

=== Jamaica ===
In September 2022, the Jamaican Football Federation announced Heimir as the new coach of the Jamaican national team, but he resigned after the Reggae Boyz performed poorly at the 2024 Copa América, even though he had signed a contract to coach the team through the 2026 World Cup qualification campaign.

Oral Tracey of Television Jamaica, one of the biggest networks in the country, said: "I think the coach disrespected Jamaica. He was contracted and agreed to pilot Jamaica’s 2026 World Cup bid. And after two games he was gone. Obviously ... he had one foot in and one foot out. When you look at some of the team selections and substitutions for those two games we have to wonder."

=== Ireland ===
On 10 July 2024, the Football Association of Ireland announced Heimir as the new coach of the Republic of Ireland national team.

On 17 November 2024, his Ireland side suffered a 5–0 defeat to England in the UEFA Nations League at Wembley Stadium, which was an all-time record defeat against their rivals.

In September 2025, the Republic of Ireland opened their 2026 FIFA World Cup qualification campaign with a 2–2 draw at home to 10-man Hungary before losing 2–1 away to Armenia, who were 105th in the FIFA World Rankings. However, the team won three straight victories over all their group opponents, earning a spot in the qualification second round after a last-gasp 3–2 away win against Hungary.

On 26 March 2026, the Republic of Ireland lost 4–3 on penalties after a 2–2 draw against Czechia in the 2026 FIFA World Cup qualification play-off semi-final.

In March 2026, Heimir signed a contact to remain as Republic of Ireland manager until after Euro 2028.

== Managerial statistics ==
As of match played 17 November 2026

Managerial record by team and tenure
| Team | From | To | Record | | | | |
| Team | From | To | P | W | D | L | Win % |
|---|---|---|---|---|---|---|---|
| (Iceland) ÍBV (men's) | 31 August 2002 | 31 December 2002 | 3 | 1 | 1 | 1 | 33.33 |
| (Iceland) ÍBV (men's) | 2 August 2006 | 31 December 2011 | 131 | 71 | 19 | 41 | 54.20 |
| Iceland (joint manager) | 25 November 2013 | 3 July 2016 | 32 | 14 | 7 | 11 | 43.75 |
| Iceland | 3 July 2016 | 17 July 2018 | 25 | 11 | 6 | 8 | 44.00 |
| (Qatar) Al-Arabi | 10 December 2018 | 30 June 2021 | 68 | 24 | 19 | 25 | 35.29 |
| Jamaica | 16 September 2022 | 30 June 2024 | 28 | 10 | 7 | 11 | 35.71 |
| Republic of Ireland | 10 July 2024 | Present | 27 | 11 | 8 | 8 | 40.74 |
| Total | | | 313 | 142 | 67 | 104 | 45.37 |
