= Birkir Már Sævarsson =

Icelandic footballer (born 1984)

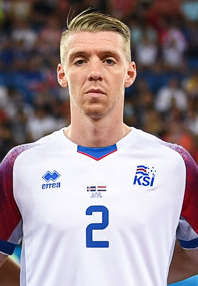
- Sævarsson with Iceland at the 2018 FIFA World Cup

Personal information
- Full name: Birkir Már Sævarsson
- Date of birth: 11 November 1984 (age 42)
- Place of birth: Reykjavík, Iceland
- Height: 1.86 m (6 ft 1 in)
- Position: Defender

Team information
- Current team: Afturelding
- Number: 2

Senior career*
Years	Team	Apps	(Gls)
2003–2008	Valur	67	(2)
2008–2014	Brann	168	(15)
2015–2017	Hammarby IF	84	(3)
2018–2024	Valur	157	(16)
2025	Nacka	22	(2)
2026	KH	0	(0)
2026–	Afturelding	22	(4)

International career
2006	Iceland U21	3	(0)
2007–2021	Iceland	103	(3)

Managerial career
- 2019: KH (assistant)
- * Club domestic league appearances and goals as of 12 September 2026

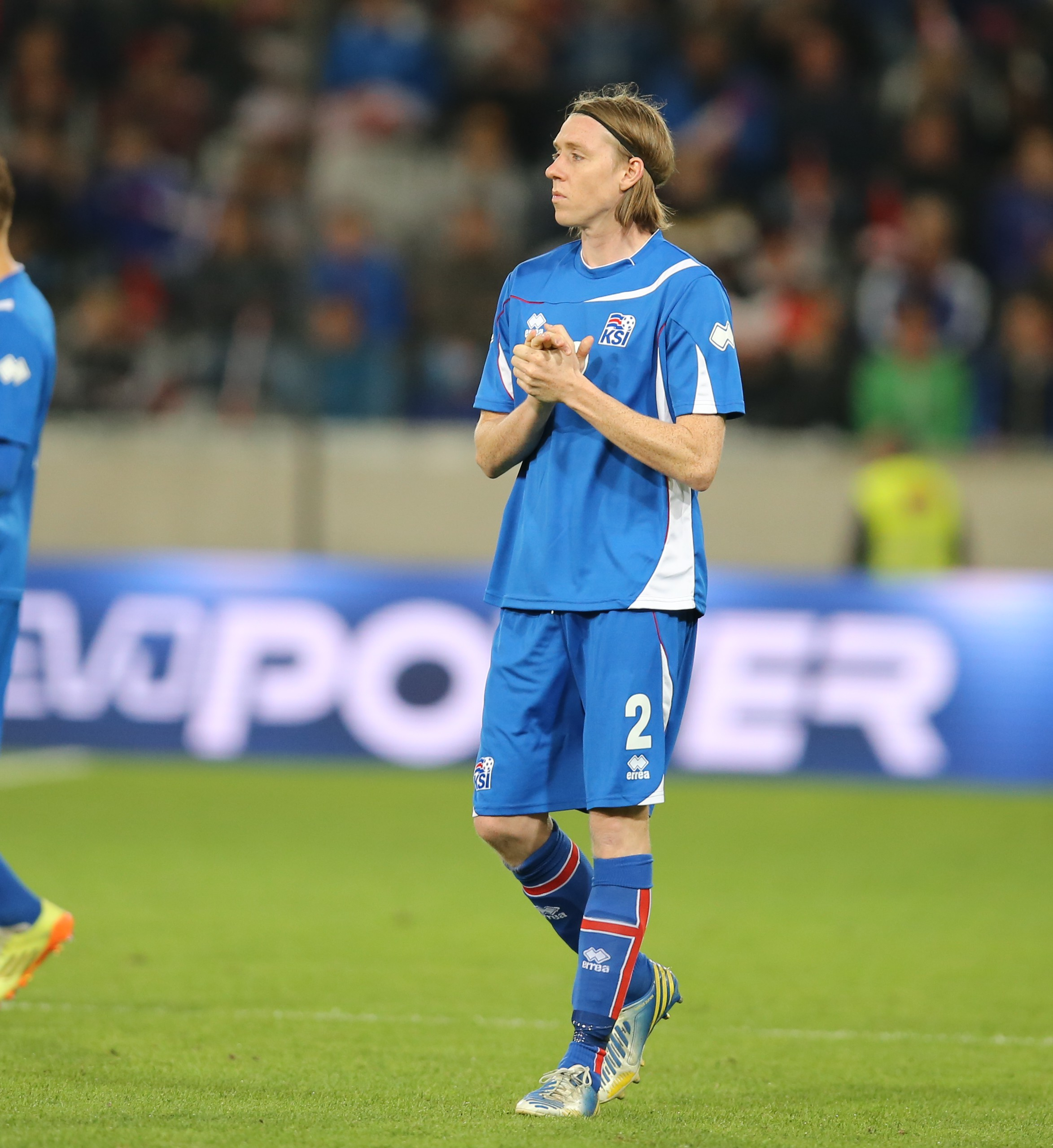
Sævarsson playing for Iceland to Austria in May 2014

Birkir Már Sævarsson (born 11 November 1984) is an Icelandic professional footballer who plays as a defender for Afturelding.

== Club career ==
=== Valur ===
Birkir started his professional career with local team Valur in the Úrvalsdeild, where he made his senior debut in 2003. He went on to play 66 competitive league games for the club, scoring twice, across five seasons. He won the 2007 Úrvalsdeild with Valur.

=== Brann ===
In 2008, at age 23, he joined the Norwegian side SK Brann in Tippeligaen. Before signing for Brann, Sævarsson had a trial with Bryne FK. Being known as a versatile defender, he was originally planned as a right back at Brann, but played almost all the 2009 season on the left back. He was often praised for his stamina, pace, and ability to contribute to the attacking play from his wing-back position. Birkir soon also became known for his scoring ability.

In 2011, his side reached the final in the Norwegian Cup, where Birkir played the whole game as Brann lost 1–2 to Aalesunds FK. Birkir played all minutes in every competitive game during the 2012 and 2013 seasons as right back.

Birkir signed a four-year contract extension with Brann in May 2013. During the reign of Swedish manager Rikard Norling, Birkir however lost his place as a regular starter at Brann. In 2014, Norling opted to play the homegrown youngster Andreas Vindheim instead of the Icelandic international. The season ultimately went horrible for Brann, who got relegated to the second tier after losing against Mjøndalen in qualification play.

The relegation also put an end to Birkir's 6.5-year spell at Brann, who transferred to the Swedish top-tier club Hammarby IF in December 2014. He reportedly left Brann on a free transfer.

=== Hammarby ===
At Hammarby he began the 2015 season as a centre-back, but eventually moved back to his natural position on the right flank after the arrival of Richard Magyar. After putting on impressive performances on both positions, he was voted as the "newcomer of the year" by the supporters. Birkir played 28 league games for his side, scoring twice, as Hammarby finished 11th in Allsvenskan. In 2016, Sævarsson played 27 competitive games, scoring once.

Birkir kept his place as a key player at Hammarby in 2017, as the club placed 9th in Allsvenskan, while providing five assists in 29 appearances. At the end of the year, Birkir sought to leave Hammarby at the expiration of his contract, seeking a new club ahead of the 2018 FIFA World Cup.

=== Return to Valur ===
Before the 2018 season, Birkir moved back to his native country and first professional club Valur. He signed a three-year deal with the reigning champions of Iceland. Birkir teamed up with his younger brother Aron Elí Sævarsson, born in 1997, in the squad. Following the conclusion of the 2024 Besta deild karla, Birkir retired from professional football.

=== Nacka ===
On 3 March 2025, Birkir signed for Nacka.

== International career ==
Birkir made his debut for the Iceland national team on 2 August 2007, in a 1–1 draw against Liechtenstein. Nine years later, on 6 June 2016, he scored his first national goal against the same opposition. Birkir slotted home a volley strike from far distance as Iceland won 4–0 in a friendly.

He played his first tournament at age 31, being selected for the UEFA Euro 2016 in France. In the second group stage game against Hungary, he scored an own goal resulting in a 1–1 draw. Birkir was praised for keeping the Portuguese winger Cristiano Ronaldo at bay in a group stage draw, as well as neutralizing Raheem Sterling in Iceland's sensational 2–1 win against England in the round of 16. Birkir played all minutes for Iceland during the tournament, where his side ultimately got knocked out in the quarter-final following a 5–2 loss against France.

In May 2018 he was named in Iceland's 23-man squad for the 2018 FIFA World Cup in Russia.

Birkir played his last game for the national team against North Macedonia on 14 November 2021.

== Coaching career ==
On 15 April 2019, it was announced that Birkir was appointed as an assistant coach to 3. deild karla club Knattspyrnufélagið Hlíðarendi.

== Career statistics ==
=== Club ===
As of 8 June 2019

Appearances and goals by club, season and competition
Season	Club	Division	League		Cup		Total	
Season	Club	Division	Apps	Goals	Apps	Goals	Apps	Goals
Valur U23	2002	Icelandic Cup	0	0	2	0	2	0
Valur	2003	Úrvalsdeild karla	8	0	0	0	8	0
Valur	2004	1. deild	11	0	2	0	13	0
Valur	2005	Úrvalsdeild karla	1	0	2	0	3	0
Valur	2006	Úrvalsdeild karla	18	0	2	0	20	0
Valur	2007	Úrvalsdeild karla	17	1	2	0	19	1
Valur	2008	Úrvalsdeild karla	11	1	3	0	14	1
Valur	Total		66	2	11	0	77	2
Brann	2008	Tippeligaen	8	1	0	0	8	1
Brann	2009	Tippeligaen	26	2	3	1	29	3
Brann	2010	Tippeligaen	27	2	1	0	28	2
Brann	2011	Tippeligaen	27	4	6	0	33	4
Brann	2012	Tippeligaen	30	2	5	2	35	4
Brann	2013	Tippeligaen	30	3	2	0	30	3
Brann	2014	Tippeligaen	20	1	3	0	23	1
Hammarby	2015	Allsvenskan	28	2	5	0	33	2
Hammarby	2016	Allsvenskan	27	1	5	0	32	1
Hammarby	2017	Allsvenskan	29	0	4	1	33	1
Hammarby	Total		84	3	14	1	98	4
Valur	2018	Úrvalsdeild karla	18	2	2	0	20	2
Valur	2019	Úrvalsdeild karla	7	1	2	0	9	1
Valur	Total		25	3	4	0	29	3
Career total			343	23	51	4	392	25

=== International ===
Appearances and goals by national team and year
National team	Year	Apps	Goals
Iceland	2007	2	0
Iceland	2008	11	0
Iceland	2009	5	0
Iceland	2010	3	0
Iceland	2011	6	0
Iceland	2012	5	0
Iceland	2013	8	0
Iceland	2014	5	0
Iceland	2015	9	0
Iceland	2016	13	1
Iceland	2017	9	0
Iceland	2018	10	0
Iceland	2019	4	0
Iceland	2020	5	1
Iceland	2021	8	1
Total		103	3

Scores and results list Iceland's goal tally first, score column indicates score after each Birkir goal.

List of international goals scored by Birkir Már Sævarsson
No.	Date	Venue	Cap	Opponent	Score	Result	Competition
1	6 June 2016	Laugardalsvöllur, Reykjavík, Iceland	57	Liechtenstein	2–0	4–0	Friendly
2	14 October 2020	Laugardalsvöllur, Reykjavík, Iceland	93	Belgium	1–1	1–2	2020–21 UEFA Nations League A
3	31 March 2021	Rheinpark Stadion, Vaduz, Liechtenstein	97	Liechtenstein	1–0	4–1	2022 FIFA World Cup qualification

== Honours ==
Valur

- Úrvalsdeild: 2007
- Icelandic Cup: 2005
- League Cup: 2008
