= 2006 Icelandic Men's Football League Cup =

Deildarbikar karla

Tournament details
- Country: Iceland
- Teams: 16

Final positions
- Champions: FH
- Runners-up: Keflavík

The 2006 Icelandic Men's Football League Cup was the 11th staging of the Icelandic Men's League Cup, a pre-season professional football competition in Iceland. The competition started on 17 February 2006 and concluded on 3 May 2006 with FH beating Keflavík 3-2 in the final.

== Details ==
- The 16 teams were divided into 2 groups of 8 teams. Each team plays one match with other teams in the group once. The top 2 teams from each group qualified for the semi-finals.

== Group stage ==
=== Group A ===
Pos	Team	Pld	W	D	L	GF	GA	GD	Pts	Qualification
1	FH (Q)	7	5	1	1	21	9	+12	16	Qualification to the Semi-finals
2	ÍBV (Q)	7	4	2	1	11	7	+4	14	Qualification to the Semi-finals
3	Breiðablik	7	3	3	1	17	11	+6	12	
4	Fylkir	7	3	3	1	16	10	+6	12	
5	Fjölnir	7	2	2	3	12	18	−6	8	
6	Grindavík	7	1	3	3	8	10	−2	6	
7	Vikingur Olafsvik	7	1	2	4	7	14	−7	5	
8	Þróttur	7	0	2	5	8	21	−13	2	

Rules for classification: 1) points; 2) goal difference; 3) number of goals scored.
(Q) Qualified for the phase indicated

=== Group B ===
Pos	Team	Pld	W	D	L	GF	GA	GD	Pts	Qualification
1	Keflavík (Q)	7	4	2	1	11	6	+5	14	Qualification to the Semi-finals
2	Þór Akureyri (Q)	7	4	2	1	9	9	0	14	Qualification to the Semi-finals
3	Víkingur Reykjavík	7	4	1	2	11	10	+1	13	
4	ÍA	7	3	3	1	16	10	+6	12	
5	Valur	7	3	2	2	17	7	+10	11	
6	KR	7	2	0	5	17	16	+1	6	
7	Fram	7	1	2	4	10	13	−3	5	
8	KA	7	1	0	6	8	28	−20	3	

Rules for classification: 1) points; 2) goal difference; 3) number of goals scored.
(Q) Qualified for the phase indicated

== Knockout stage ==
=== Semi-finals ===
23 April 2006

FH	2–0	Þór Akureyri
Bjornsson 49'; Gudmundsson 75'

Kaplakriki, Hafnarfjörður

27 April 2006

Keflavík	2–1 (a.e.t.)	ÍBV
Own Goal 72'; Steinarsson 100'		Henriksen 35'

Keflavíkurvöllur, Keflavík

=== Final ===
3 May 2006

FH	3–2	Keflavík
Olafsson 7'; Bjarnason 32'; Gudmundsson 45'		Samuelsen 55'; Runarsson 72'

Stjörnuvöllur, Garðabær
Referee: Kristinn Jakobsson

FH:
GK	(Iceland) Róbert Örn Óskarsson
DF	(Iceland) Hermann Albertsson	(substituted off) 46'
DF	(Iceland) Armann Smari Bjornsson
DF	(Iceland) Gudmundur Saevarsson
DF	(Iceland) Freyr Bjarnason
MF	(Iceland) Asgeir Gunnar Asgeirsson
MF	(Iceland) Olafur Pall Snorrason	(substituted off) 76'
MF	(Iceland) Baldur Bett
MF	(Iceland) Sigurvin Olafsson
MF	(Denmark) Allan Dyring	(substituted off) 82'
FW	(Iceland) Tryggvi Guðmundsson
Substitutes:
DF	(Iceland) Heimir Gudnason	(substituted on) 46'
MF	(Iceland) Ali Vidar Bjornsson	(substituted on) 76'
FW	(Iceland) Atli Gudnason	(substituted on) 82'
Manager:
(Iceland) Olafur David Johannesson

KEFLAVÍK:
GK	(Iceland) Ómar Jóhannsson
DF	(Iceland) Gudmundur Vidar Mete
DF	(Iceland) Guðjón Árni Antoníusson
DF	(Serbia and Montenegro) Branislav Milisevic
DF	(United States) Geoff Miles	(substituted off) 53'
MF	(Lebanon) Buddy Farah
MF	(Australia) Daniel Severino
MF	(Iceland) Holmar Orn Runarsson
MF	(Faroe Islands) Simun Samuelsen
FW	(Iceland) Magnus Sverrir Thorsteinsson	(substituted off) 66'
FW	(Iceland) Gudmundur Steinarsson
Substitutes:
MF	(Iceland) Thorarinn Brynjar Kristjansson	(substituted on) 53'
FW	(Iceland)	Olafur Thor Berry	(substituted on) 66'
Manager:
(Iceland) Kristinn Jakobsson

== See also ==
- Icelandic Men's Football Cup
- Knattspyrnusamband Íslands - The Icelandic Football Association
- Icelandic First Division League 2006
