= Sturluson =

Sturluson is a patronymic surname. Notable people with the patronymic include:

- Kjartan Sturluson (born 1975), Icelandic footballer
- Örlygur Aron Sturluson (1981–2000), Icelandic basketball player
- Sighvatr Sturluson (1170–1238), skaldic poet, goði and member of the Icelandic Sturlungar clan
- Snorri Sturluson (1179–1241), Icelandic historian, poet, and politician
