= Sverrir Garðarsson =

Icelandic footballer (born 1984)

Personal information
- Full name: Sverrir Garðarsson
- Date of birth: 15 September 1984 (age 42)
- Place of birth: Iceland
- Height: 1.89 m (6 ft 2 in)
- Position: Defender

Team information
- Current team: KFS

Senior career*
| Years | Team | Apps | (Gls) |
| 2000 | FH | | |
| 2001–2002 | Molde FK | | |
| 2003–2007 | FH | 50 | (1) |
| 2008–2009 | GIF Sundsvall | 16 | (0) |
| 2009 | FH | 8 | (0) |
| 2012 | ÍBV | 0 | (0) |
| 2012 | Haukar | 15 | (0) |
| 2013– | Fylkir | 12 | (0) |

International career^{‡}
| 2000 | Iceland U-17 | 4 | (2) |
| 2001–2002 | Iceland U-19 | 6 | (0) |
| 2004 | Iceland U-21 | 5 | (0) |
| 2007 | Iceland | 1 | (0) |
- * Club domestic league appearances and goals as of 28 September 2013 ‡ National team caps and goals as of 21 January 2013

Sverrir Garðarsson (born 15 September 1984) is an Icelandic footballer, currently playing for Fylkir in the Icelandic Úrvalsdeild.

Sverrir has previously played in Norway for Molde FK and in Sweden for GIF Sundsvall.

== Club career ==
Sverrir started his career with local club FH before moving abroad to Molde FK. He later returned to FH and played two full seasons with the club before injuring himself, being out for two seasons. He returned for the 2007 season, moving abroad to play with GIF Sundsvall after the season. He returned again to FH in 2009 and played 8 games. He then announced that he had quit football due to a head injury, but announced his intention to start playing again in 2012 and switched to fellow Úrvalsdeild team ÍBV and played with them in the Icelandic League Cup. However, he left the team before the season started and joined 1. deild club Haukar, FH's local rivals, and managed to play 15 games. After the season Fylkir announced that Sverrir would play with them for the 2013 season.
