= Gunnar Örn Jónsson =

Icelandic footballer

Personal information
- Full name: Gunnar Örn Jónsson
- Date of birth: 30 April 1985 (age 41)
- Place of birth: Iceland
- Height: 1.83 m (6 ft 0 in)
- Position: Winger

Team information
- Current team: Augnablik Kópavogur

Senior career*
Years	Team	Apps	(Gls)
2002–2007	Breiðablik	67	(7)
2006	→ Fjölnir (Loan)	6	(1)
2008–2011	KR	72	(11)
2012–2014	Stjarnan	26	(4)
2014–2015	Fylkir	21	(2)
2015–2016	Augnablik Kópavogur	0	(0)

International career^{‡}
2010	Iceland	1	(0)
- * Club domestic league appearances and goals as of 22 August 2013 ‡ National team caps and goals as of 1 February 2011

Gunnar Örn Jónsson (born 30 April 1985) is an Icelandic football player, currently playing for Icelandic football club Augnablik Kópavogur.

== Club career ==
Born in Reykjavík, Jónsson began his career with Úrvalsdeild side Breiðablik, based in Kópavogur in 2002. After good performances with Breiðablik in the 2007 season he was signed by the giants of Icelandic football KR before the 2008 season.

In the 2009 Úrvalsdeild season Jónsson scored 8 goals in 20 league games for KR and was selected by fellow players as member of the "2009 team of the season". In March 2010 Jónsson played his first game for Iceland against Mexico, coming on as substitute in 0–0 draw. After impressive pre-season in 2010 where KR won the official pre-season tournament, Jónsson and his teammates were unable to meet the high expectations and finished only 4th in the 2010 Úrvalsdeild.

On 16 April 2015, Jónsson joined Augnablik Kópavogur.
