= 2007 Icelandic Cup =

Visa-Bikar

Tournament details
- Country: Iceland

Final positions
- Champions: FH
- Runners-up: Fjölnir

The 2007 Visa-Bikar was the 48th season of the Icelandic national football cup. It started on 11 May 2007 and concluded with the Final held on 6 October 2007. The winners qualified for the second qualifying round of the 2008–09 UEFA Cup.

== Preliminary round ==
Ties were played on 11 and 12 May 2007.

| Team 1 | Score | Team 2 |
|---|---|---|
11 May 2007
| Berserkir | 2–0 | UMFL |
| Grundarfjörður | 1–1 (a.e.t.); 5−4 (pen) | Höfrungur |
| Hamrarnir | 5–1 | Snörtur |
| KB | 4–0 | Kjalnesingar |
| KFR | 0–0 (a.e.t.); 2−4 (pen) | Hrunamenn |
12 May 2007
| Álftanes | 3–1 | Augnablik |

== First round ==
The First Round consisted of 32 teams from lower Icelandic divisions. The matches were played on 16 and 17 May 2007.

| Team 1 | Score | Team 2 |
|---|---|---|
16 May 2007
| Ægir | 0–1 | Berserkir |
| Magni | 0–2 | Tindastóll |
| Skallagrímur | 2–1 | KB |
| Ýmir | 3–1 | Hrunamenn |
17 May 2007
| Árborg | 1–4 | Víðir |
| Dalvík/Reynir | 2–2 (a.e.t.); 4−3 (pen) | KS/Leiftur |
| GG | 2–3 | Álftanes |
| Grundarfjörður | 4–3 | Snæfell |
| Hamar | 2–1 | Hvíti riddarinn |
| Hamrarnir | 2–1 | Hvöt |
| Kári | 1–8 | Grótta |
| KV | 8–0 | Afríka |
| Völsungur | 4–0 | Vinir |

== Second round ==
The Second Round matches were played on 31 May and 1 June 2007.

| Team 1 | Score | Team 2 |
|---|---|---|
31 May 2007
| Grótta | 2–0 | Berserkir |
| Hamar | 0–0 (a.e.t.); 3–1 (pen) | Álftanes |
| Höttur | 4–1 (a.e.t.) | Huginn |
| ÍH | 0–1 (a.e.t.) | Ýmir |
| KV | 2–3 | Selfoss |
| Neisti D. | 0–3 | Sindri |
| Tindastóll | 2–2 (a.e.t.); 3−5 (pen) | Völsungur |
1 June 2007
| Afturelding | 10–1 | Grundarfjörður |
| Hamrarnir | 0–4 | Dalvík/Reynir |
| Leiknir Fáskrúðsfirði | 3–0 | Boltfelag Nordfjörður |
| Skallagrímur | 0–5 | Haukar |
| Víðir | 1–3 | ÍR |

== Third round ==
Third round matches were played on 11 and 12 June 2007.

| Team 1 | Score | Team 2 |
|---|---|---|
11 June 2007
| Hamar | 0–5 | Stjarnan |
| Grótta | 1–2 | Reynir Sandgerði |
| ÍBV | 1–0 | Afturelding |
| Þór Akureyri | 1–0 | KA |
12 June 2007
| Fjölnir | 2–1 | Njarðvík |
| Höttur | 0–2 | KF Fjarðabyggð |
| ÍR | 1–3 (a.e.t.) | Grindavík |
| Leiknir Reykjavík | 3–1 | Selfoss |
| Þróttur | 6–1 | Ýmir |
| Víkingur Ólafsvík | 2–2 (a.e.t.); 4−5 (pen) | Haukar |
| Dalvík/Reynir | 1–0 | Völsungur |
| Leiknir Fáskrúðsfirði | 2–1 | Sindri |

== Fourth round ==
The matches were played on 25 and 26 June 2007.

| Team 1 | Score | Team 2 |
|---|---|---|
25 June 2007
| ÍBV | 10–0 | Reynir Sandgerði |
26 June 2007
| Dalvík/Reynir | 0–4 | Þór Akureyri |
| KF Fjarðabyggð | 4–1 | Leiknir Fáskrúðsfirði |
| Haukar | 3–1 (a.e.t.) | Leiknir Reykjavík |
| Þróttur | 1–0 | Grindavík |
| Stjarnan | 2–3 (a.e.t.) | Fjölnir |

== Fifth round ==
The matches were played on 10 and 11 July 2007.

| Team 1 | Score | Team 2 |
|---|---|---|
10 July 2007
| KF Fjarðabyggð | 2–3 | Fjölnir |
| ÍBV | 0–3 | FH |
| ÍA | 2–1 (a.e.t.) | Víkingur Reykjavík |
| KR | 1–1 (a.e.t.); 0−3 (pen) | Valur |
| Haukar | 2–2 (a.e.t.); 4−3 (pen) | Fram |
11 July 2007
| Þróttur | 0–1 | Keflavík |
| Þór Akureyri | 1–4 | Fylkir |
| Breiðablik | 3–1 (a.e.t.) | HK |

== Quarter-finals ==
The matches were played on 12 and 13 August 2007.

| Team 1 | Score | Team 2 |
|---|---|---|
12 August 2007
| Breiðablik | 3–1 | Keflavík |
| Fylkir | 3–1 (a.e.t.) | ÍA |
13 August 2007
| Fjölnir | 4–3 | Haukar |
| Valur | 0–1 | FH |

== Semi-finals ==
The matches were played on 31 August and 1 September 2007.

2 September 2007

| FH | 3–1 (a.e.t.) | Breiðablik |
|---|---|---|
| Asgeirsson 52'; Gudmundsson 100'; Gudnason 120' | | Rajcomar 65' |

Laugardalsvollur, Reykjavík
Attendance: 2,221
Referee: Garðar Örn Hinriksson

3 September 2007

| Fylkir | 1–2 (a.e.t.) | Fjölnir |
|---|---|---|
| Ingason 43' | | Gudmundsson 56' (pen.); Bjornsson 113' |

Laugardalsvollur, Reykjavík
Attendance: 1,924
Referee: Johannes Valgeirsson

== Final ==
6 October 2007

| FH | 2–1 (a.e.t.) | Fjölnir |
|---|---|---|
| Gudmundsson 17', 105' | | Gudmundsson 86' (pen.) |

Laugardalsvollur, Reykjavík
Attendance: 3,739
Referee: Egill Mar Markusson
