= 2010 Icelandic Cup =

Visa-Bikar

Tournament details
- Country: Iceland

Final positions
- Champions: FH
- Runners-up: KR

The 2010 Visa-Bikar was the 51st season of the Icelandic national football cup. It began on 7 May 2010 and ended with the final on 14 August 2010 at Laugardalsvöllur. The winners qualified for the second qualifying round of the 2011–12 UEFA Europa League.

== First round ==
The First Round consisted of 38 teams from the lower Icelandic divisions and eight teams from the third division. The matches were played between 7 and 9 May 2010.

Team 1	Score	Team 2
6 May 2010
Léttir	2–4	Víkingur Ólafsvík
7 May 2010
UMF Gnúpverja	1–4	UMF Kjalnesinga
8 May 2010
Ýmir	0–3	UMF Hamar
Berserkir	1–4	KB
Reynir Sandgerði	2–3	ÍH Hafnarfjördur
KV	3–1	Elliði
Skallagrímur	9–0	Afríka
Augnablik	2–2	Ægir
KFR	5–3	Árborgar
Víðir	4–2	Vængir Júpiters
Höttur	4–6	Leiknir Fáskrúðsfirði
UMF Afturelding	3–0	Grundarfjörður
Magni	1–4	UMF Tindastóll
Spyrnir	2–0	Einherji
Dalvík/Reynir	7–2	Samherjar
9 May 2010
UMFL	1–9	UMF Álftanes
KFG	4–0	Ísbjörninn
Huginn	2–5	UMF Sindri
Þróttur Vogum	3–1	Ármann
Markaregn	0–4	KFK
Draupnir	8–0	Kormákur
10 May 2010
Carl	2–0	Hvíti riddarinn
13 May 2010
KFS	2–1	Björninn

== Second round ==
The Second Round included the 23 winners from the previous round as well as one team from the lower Icelandic divisions (Höfrungur), four teams from the third division and all 12 teams from the second division. The matches were played between 17 and 19 May 2010.

Team 1	Score	Team 2
17 May 2010
KA	2–0	Draupnir
18 May 2010
BÍ/Bolungarvík	12–0	Höfrungur
UMF Hvöt	0–3	Þór Akureyri
Víðir	2–0	ÍH
Afturelding	4–0	Augnablik
Dalvík/Reynir	1–2	Völsungur
Sindri	5–2	Leiknir F.
Hamar	1–1	Grótta
KFS	2–5	Víkingur Ólafsvik
Fjarðabyggð	10–0	Spyrnir
19 May 2010
KFK	2–7	ÍR
KS/Leiftur	2–1	Tindastóll
HK	9–0	Þróttur V.
Njarðvík	2–0	Carl
Skallagrímur)	0–6	Víkingur Reykjavik
Kjalnesingar	1–6	Leiknir Reykjavík
Álftanes	1–4	Þróttur
ÍA	5–0	KFG
KV	0–5	Fjölnir
KB	2–1	KFR

== Third round ==
The Third round included the 20 winners from the previous round and the 12 teams from the Úrvalsdeild. These matches were played on 2 and 3 June 2010. The round saw the demise of the reigning champions Breiðablik come to an end at the hands of FH and a penalty shoot out which saw Breiðablik miss 3 penalty kicks in a row. The round also saw the progression of two 2. deild karla teams to the fourth round, BÍ/Bolungarvík and Vikingur Ó.

2 June 2010
18:00 GMT

Fjarðabyggð	3–2 (a.e.t.)	Njarðvík FC
Þórðarson 28'; Hjálmarsson 57'; Smárason 105'	Report	Freysteinsson 20'; Jónsson 52'

Fjarðabyggðarhöllin, Eskifjörður
Referee: Einar Örn Daníelsson

2 June 2010
19:15 GMT

BÍ/Bolungarvík	2–0	Völsungur
Krivokapic 25'; Bjarnason 70'	Report

Torfnesvöllur, Bolungarvík
Referee: Halldór Breiðfjörð Jóhannsson

2 June 2010
19:15 GMT

Vikingur R.	7–0	Sindri
Guðmundsson 21', 24', 43', 68'; Sveinsson 41'; Guðmundsson 75'; Leifsson 87'	Report

Víkingsvöllur, Reykjavík
Referee: Pétur Guðmundsson

2 June 2010
19:15 GMT

KB	0–1	Vikingur Ó.
	Report	Beslija 89'

Leiknisvöllur, Reykjavík
Referee: Þórður Már Gylfason

2 June 2010
19:15 GMT

ÍBV	0–1	KR
	Report	Finnbogason 55'

Hásteinsvöllur, Vestmannaeyjar
Referee: Gunnar Jarl Jónsson

2 June 2010
19:15 GMT

KA	3–2 (a.e.t.)	HK
Stefánsson 35', 96'; Steingrímsson 92'	Report	Garðarsson 9'; Albertsson 92'

KA-völlur, Akureyri
Referee: Gunnar Sverrir Gunnarsson

2 June 2010
19:15 GMT

Fram	2–1	ÍR
Björnsson 37', 48'	Report	Gunnarsson 88'

Laugardalsvöllur, Reykjavík
Referee: Þorvaldur Árnason

3 June 2010
19:15 GMT

Valur	2–1	Afturelding
Sigurðsson 28'; Illugason 84'	Report	Þrastarson 26'

Vodafonevöllurinn, Reykjavík
Referee: Guðmundur Ársæll Guðmundsson

3 June 2010
19:15 GMT

Leiknir R.	1–3	Stjarnan
Daníelsson 44'	Report	Björnsson 73'; Laxdal 76', 92'

Leiknisvöllur, Reykjavík
Referee: Jóhannes Valgeirsson

3 June 2010
19:15 GMT

Þróttur R.	3–1	Grótta
Hilmisson 37', 80'; Vilhjálmsson 69'	Report	Arnþórsson 36'

Valbjarnarvöllur, Reykjavík
Referee: Örvar Sær Gíslason

3 June 2010
19:15 GMT

Haukar	0–2	Fjölnir
	Report	Guðmundsson 16', 79'

Ásvellir, Hafnarfjörður
Referee: Þóroddur Hjaltalín Jr.

3 June 2010
19:15 GMT

Víðir	0–2	Fylkir
	Report	Þórhallsson 22'; Þorsteinsson 86'

Garðsvöllur, Garður
Referee: Hákon Þorsteinsson

3 June 2010
19:15 GMT

Grindavík	2–1	Þór
Jósefsson 85'; Ondo 88'	Report	Zivanovic 6'

Grindavíkurvöllur, Grindavík
Referee: Kristinn Jakobsson

3 June 2010
19:15 GMT

Keflavík	1–0	KS/Leiftur
Matthíasson 63'	Report

Njarðtaksvöllurinn, Keflavík
Referee: Erlendur Eiríksson

3 June 2010
19:15 GMT

ÍA	2–1	Selfoss
Júlíusson 45'; Alexandersson 79'	Report	Birgisson 50'

Akranesvöllur, Akranes
Referee: Magnús Þórisson

3 June 2010
20:00 GMT

Breiðablik	1–1 (a.e.t.)	FH
Pétursson 71'	Report	Sverrisson 72'
Penalties
Finnbogason (penalty scored); Pétursson (penalty missed); Elísabetarson (penalty missed); Ársælsson (penalty missed)	1–3	(penalty missed) Modland; (penalty missed) Viðar; (penalty scored) Sverrisson; (penalty scored) Vilhjálmsson; (penalty scored) Guðnason

Kópavogsvöllur, Kópavogur
Referee: Valgeir Valgeirsson

== Fourth round ==
This round consisted of the 16 winners of the previous round. These matches were drawn on 7 June at the Football Association of Iceland headquarters in Reykjavík. The draw consisted of 8 teams from the Pepsi-deild karla, 6 from the 1. deild karla and 2 from the 2. deild karla. All matches were played between 23 and 24 June 2010.

23 June 2010
19:15 GMT

Fjölnir	1–2	KR
Markan 49'	Report	Sigurðsson 63'; Takefusa 75'

Fjölnisvöllur, Reykjavík
Attendance: 742
Referee: Valgeir Valgeirsson

23 June 2010
19:15 GMT

ÍA	0–1	Þróttur R.
	Report	Guamundsson 11'

Akranesvöllur, Akranes
Attendance: 691
Referee: Einar Örn Daníelsson

23 June 2010
19:15 GMT

BÍ/Bolungarvík	0–2	Stjarnan
	Report	Finsen 12'; Björnsson 50'

Torfnesvöllur, Hnífsdalur
Referee: Gunnar Jarl Jónsson

23 June 2010
19:15 GMT

Vikingur Ó.	3–2	Fjarðabyggð
Cekulajevs 16', 63'; Luba 56'	Report	Smárason 50'; Eysteinsson 75'

Ólafsvíkurvöllur, Ólafsvík
Attendance: 203
Referee: Örvar Sær Gíslason

23 June 2010
20:00 GMT

Vikingur R.	1–3 (a.e.t.)	Valur
Sveinsson 76'	Report	König 44'; Illugason 109'; Hafsteinsson 115'

Víkingsvöllur, Reykjavík
Referee: Erlendur Eiríksson

24 June 2010
17:30 GMT

Grindavík	1–1 (a.e.t.)	KA
Hjartarson 61'	Report	Disztl 39' (pen.)
Penalties
Helgason (penalty scored); Jónsson (penalty scored); Guðmundsson (penalty scored); Ondo (penalty scored); Hjartarson (penalty missed)	4–5	(penalty scored) Steingrímsson; (penalty scored) Gústafsson; (penalty scored) Steingrímsson; (penalty scored) Hauksson; (penalty scored) Stefánsson

Grindavíkurvöllur, Grindavík
Attendance: 122
Referee: Magnús Þórisson

24 June 2010
19:15 GMT

Keflavík	2–3	FH
McShane 76'; Guðmundsson 85'	Report	Snorrason 45'; Nielsen 71'; Guðnason 80'

Sparisjóðsv, Keflavík
Referee: Kristinn Jakobsson

24 June 2010
19:15 GMT

Fylkir	0–2	Fram
	Report	Þórarinsson 33', 83'

Fylkisvöllur, Reykjavík
Attendance: 511
Referee: Jóhannes Valgeirsson

== Quarter-finals ==
This round consisted of the 8 winners of the previous round. These matches were drawn on 25 June at the Football Association of Iceland headquarters in Reykjavík. The draw consisted of five teams from the Pepsi-deild karla, two from the 1. deild karla and one from the 2. deild karla. All matches were played between 1 and 12 July 2010.

11 July 2010
18:00 GMT

FH	3–0	KA
Snorrason 52', 75'; Vilhjálmsson 68'	Report

Kaplakrikavöllur, Hafnarfjörður
Referee: Gunnar Jarl Jónsson

12 July 2010
19:15 GMT

Fram	3–1	Valur
Jónsson 50'; Leifsson 55'; Tillen 58'	Report	Sigurjónsson 65'

Laugardalsvöllur, Reykjavík
Attendance: 767
Referee: Þóroddur Hjaltalín Jr.

12 July 2010
19:15 GMT

KR	3–2	Þróttur R.
Sigurðsson 12', 72'; Takefusa 30' (pen.)	Report	Vilhjálmsson 86'; Milos Tanasic 90'

KR-völlur, Reykjavík
Attendance: 605
Referee: Jóhannes Valgeirsson

12 July 2010
19:15 GMT

Vikingur Ó.	3–3 (a.e.t.)	Stjarnan
Emilsson 9'; Beslija 85'; Sigurþórsson 92'	Report	Eysteinsson 89'; Hreinsson 90'; Björgvinsson 100'
Penalties
Gonchar (penalty scored); Guðjónsson (penalty scored); Kristmundsson (penalty scored); Luba (penalty missed); Beslija (penalty scored); Ragnarsson (penalty scored)	5–4	(penalty scored) Sturluson; (penalty scored) Eysteinsson; (penalty scored) Björnsson; (penalty scored) Björgvinsson; (penalty missed) Hreinsson; (penalty missed) Laxdal

Ólafsvíkurvöllur, Ólafsvík
Referee: Þorvaldur Árnason

== Semi-finals ==
The semi-final matches involve the four winners from the previous quarter-final round on 28 and 29 July 2010. The draw took place at the Football Association of Iceland headquarters in Reykjavík on 13 July 2010.

28 July 2010
19:15 GMT

FH	3–1	Vikingur Ó.
G. Guðmundsson 40'; A. Björnsson 57'; M. Vilhjálmsson 70' (pen.)	Report	T. Nielsen 42' (o.g.)

Kaplakrikavöllur, Hafnarfjörður
Attendance: 2,073
Referee: Magnús Þórisson

29 July 2010
20:00 GMT

KR	4–0	Fram
Ó. Hauksson 41'; G. Sigurðsson 58'; B. Takefusa 70', 80'	Report

KR-völlur, Reykjavík
Attendance: 1,508
Referee: Gunnar Jarl Jónsson

== Final ==
The final took place at Laugardalsvöllur on 14 August 2010 and was contested between the winners of the previous semi-final matches.

14 August 2010
18:00 GMT

FH	4–0	KR
Vilhjálmsson 35', 41'; Björnsson 75'; Guðnason 86'	Report

Laugardalsvöllur, Reykjavík
Attendance: 5,438
Referee: Erlendur Eiríksson
