= Ásta Árnadóttir =

Icelandic footballer (born 1983)

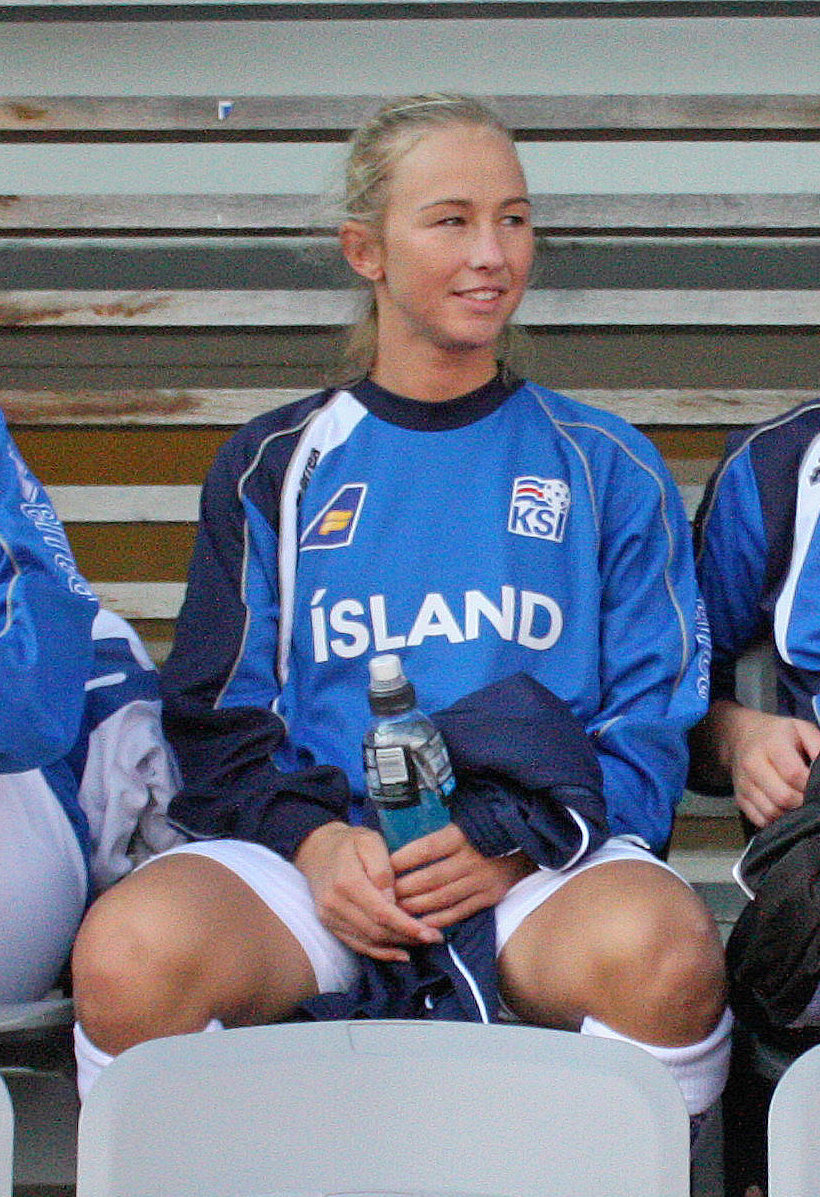
- Ásta in 2009

Personal information
- Full name: Ásta Árnadóttir
- Date of birth: 9 June 1983 (age 43)
- Place of birth: Iceland
- Position: Defender

Senior career*
Years	Team	Apps	(Gls)
1999–2000	Þór/KA	14	(0)
2001–2003	Þór/KA/KS	42	(5)
2004–2008	Valur	74	(1)
2009	Tyresö FF		
2010	Valur	1	(0)
2016	KH	7	(0)
2018–present	Augnablik	25	(4)

International career^{‡}
2000	Iceland U-17	4	(0)
2000–2001	Iceland U-19	13	(1)
2001–2006	Iceland U-21	22	(0)
2004–2009	Iceland	37	(0)

Managerial career
- 2015: Valur (assistant)
- * Club domestic league appearances and goals as of 11 July 2020 ‡ National team caps and goals as of 11 July 2020

Ásta Árnadóttir (born 9 June 1983) is an Icelandic footballer who plays the position of defender. Ásta was part of Iceland's national team and was a member of the squad at UEFA Women's Euro 2009. Ásta has played for Tyresö FF in Sweden. She returned to Iceland to Valur in December 2009 but was undecided on whether she would play any more football. She played one game during the 2010 season, which ended up being the national championship clinching game.

She returned to the field in 2016 when she played for Knattspyrnufélagið Hlíðarendi in the 1. deild kvenna. In 2018 she joined Augnablik and helped the team win the 2. deild kvenna and achieve promotion to the 1. deild kvenna.

She was known for her flick-flack throw-ins and recorded a video for UEFA Training Ground series, demonstrating the technique.

== International career ==
Ásta made her senior international debut for Iceland in a 4–3 defeat by the United States in September 2004.

At UEFA Women's Euro 2009, Ásta was included in the squad but did not play in any of the matches as Iceland were eliminated in the first round.

== Titles ==
- Icelandic Championships: 5

- 2004, 2006, 2007, 2008, 2010

- Icelandic Cup: 1

- 2006

- Icelandic Super Cup: 3

- 2005, 2007, 2008

- 2. deild kvenna: 1

- 2018
