= Knattspyrnufélagið Hlíðarendi =

KH
- Full name: Knattspyrnufélagið Hlíðarendi
- Ground: Hlíðarendi, Reykjavík, Iceland
- Capacity: 1,524
- Chairman: Sindri Rafn Sindrason
- Manager: Hallgrímur Dan Daníelsson
- League: 3. deild karla
- 2025: 4. deild karla, 2nd of 10 (promoted)

Knattspyrnufélagið Hlíðarendi (Icelandic pronunciation: [ˈkʰnahtˌspɪ(r)tnʏˌfjɛːˌlaijɪð ˈl̥iːðarˌɛntɪ], lit. 'Hlíðarendi Football Club' (Note: Knattspyrnufélagið is the definite form of Knattspyrnufélag, meaning "the football club".)), commonly known as KH, is a football club, based in Reykjavík, Iceland. It plays its home games at Hlíðarendi. It fields both men's and women's team and is affiliated with Knattspyrnufélagið Valur.

== Men's football ==
KH men's football team debuted in the Icelandic tournament and the Icelandic Cup in 2011. In 2017, it was promoted to the 3. deild karla after beating Kórdrengir in the promotion playoffs. In 2019, Hallgrímur Dan Daníelsson and Birkir Már Sævarsson were hired as managers of the team.

=== Trophies and achievements ===
- 4. deild karla
  - Winners: 2017
  - Winners: 2021 (undefeated)

=== Notable players ===
- (Iceland) Matthías Guðmundsson
- (Iceland) Sigurbjörn Örn Hreiðarsson

== Women's football ==
The women's team debuted in the 1. deild kvenna during the 2016 season, when it finished 6th in Group A. It did not participate the next four seasons but returned ahead of the 2021 season in cooperation with Valur.

=== Notable players ===
- (Iceland) Ásta Árnadóttir
