= Haukar RC =

- Founded: 2014
- Location: Hafnarfjörður, Iceland
- Ground: Ásvellir
Team kit

Haukar RC is an Icelandic rugby team based in Hafnarfjörður.
