= 2008 Úrvalsdeild =

Úrvalsdeild
- Season: 2008
- Dates: 10 May – 27 September 2008
- Champions: FH
- Relegated: HK; ÍA
- Champions League: FH
- Europa League: Keflavík; Fram; KR
- Matches played: 132
- Goals scored: 412 (3.12 per match)
- Top goalscorer: Guðmundur Steinarsson (16)

The 2008 season of Úrvalsdeild was the 97th season of top-tier football in Iceland. The league, also known as Landsbankadeild for sponsoring reasons, has been expanded from 10 teams to 12 teams in 2008.

== Teams and venues ==
Team	Location	Venue	Capacity
FH	Hafnarfjörður	Kaplakriki	6,000
Keflavík	Reykjanesbær	Keflavíkurvöllur	4,000
Fram	Reykjavík	Laugardalsvöllur	9,800
KR Reykjavík	Reykjavík	KR-völlur	6,000
Valur	Reykjavík	Vodafonevöllurinn	3,000
Fjölnir	Reykjavík	Fjölnisvöllur	1,000
Grindavík	Grindavík	Grindavíkurvöllur	1,500
Breiðablik	Kópavogur	Kópavogsvöllur	5,000
Fylkir	Reykjavík	Fylkisvöllur	4,000
Þróttur	Reykjavík	Valbjarnarvöllur	2,500
HK Kópavogs	Kópavogur	Kópavogsvöllur	5,000
ÍA Akranes	Akranes	Akranesvöllur	850

== Promotion and relegation ==
Víkingur Reykjavík were relegated from Úrvalsdeild after finishing in 10th place the previous season. Their place was taken by 1. deild champions UMF Grindavík. Due to expansion from 10 to 12 teams, 2nd placed Þróttur Reykjavík and 3rd placed Fjölnir Reykjavík were also promoted.

== League table ==
Pos	Team	Pld	W	D	L	GF	GA	GD	Pts	Qualification or relegation
1	FH (C)	22	15	2	5	50	25	+25	47	Qualification for the Champions League second qualifying round
2	Keflavík	22	14	4	4	54	31	+23	46	Qualification for the Europa League first qualifying round
3	Fram	22	13	1	8	31	21	+10	40	Qualification for the Europa League first qualifying round
4	KR	22	12	3	7	38	23	+15	39	Qualification for the Europa League second qualifying round (Note: KR Reykjavík won VISA-bikar 2008 and thereby qualified for the second qualifying round of the UEFA Europa League.)
5	Valur	22	11	2	9	34	28	+6	35	
6	Fjölnir	22	10	1	11	39	33	+6	31	
7	Grindavík	22	9	4	9	29	36	−7	31	
8	Breiðablik	22	8	6	8	41	36	+5	30	
9	Fylkir	22	6	4	12	24	40	−16	22	
10	Þróttur Reykjavík	22	5	7	10	28	46	−18	22	
11	HK (R)	22	5	3	14	26	47	−21	18	Relegation to 1. deild karla
12	ÍA (R)	22	2	7	13	18	46	−28	13	Relegation to 1. deild karla

Source: ksi.is (in Icelandic)
Rules for classification: 1) points; 2) goal difference; 3) number of goals scored.
(C) Champions; (R) Relegated

== Results ==
Each team played every opponent once home and away for a total of 22 matches.

Home \ Away	BRE	FJÖ	FRA	FYL	GRI	FH	HK	ÍA	KEF	KR	VAL	ÞRÓ
Breiðablik		4–1	3–0	2–3	3–6	4–1	2–1	6–1	2–2	1–1	0–2	0–0
Fjölnir	1–2		0–1	1–0	0–1	3–3	3–1	2–0	1–2	2–1	2–3	3–4
Fram	2–1	3–1		3–0	0–1	4–1	2–0	2–0	0–2	0–2	2–1	1–0
Fylkir	0–2	0–3	0–3		0–1	0–2	2–1	2–2	3–3	0–2	2–0	2–3
Grindavík	2–2	0–1	0–2	1–3		0–3	2–2	1–1	0–1	2–1	3–5	2–2
FH	3–0	2–0	2–1	1–2	0–1		4–0	2–0	3–2	2–0	3–0	2–0
HK	2–1	1–6	0–2	1–1	0–2	0–4		1–1	1–2	0–3	4–2	4–0
ÍA	1–1	0–3	1–0	2–3	1–2	2–5	1–2		1–4	0–0	0–0	1–1
Keflavík	3–1	1–2	1–2	2–1	3–0	1–0	3–2	3–1		4–2	5–3	5–0
KR	1–2	2–0	2–0	3–0	3–1	1–2	2–1	2–0	2–2		1–2	5–2
Valur	1–0	2–1	2–0	2–0	3–0	0–1	0–1	0–1	1–1	0–1		2–0
Þróttur Reykjavík	2–2	0–3	1–1	0–0	0–1	4–4	2–1	4–1	3–2	0–1	0–3	

Source: ksi.is (in Icelandic)
Legend: Blue = home team win; Yellow = draw; Red = away team win.

== Top goalscorers ==
Source: ksi.is (in Icelandic)

Rank	Player	Club	Goals
1	(Iceland) Guðmundur Steinarsson	Keflavík	16
2	(Iceland) Björgólfur Hideaki Takefusa	KR	14
3	(Iceland) Tryggvi Guðmundsson	FH	12
4	(Iceland) Atli Viðar Björnsson	FH	11
5	(Iceland) Gunnar Már Guðmundsson	Fjölnir	10
5	(Iceland) Helgi Sigurðsson	Valur	10
7	(Iceland) Guðjón Baldvinsson	KR	9
7	(Iceland) Pétur Georg Markann	Fjölnir	9
7	(Serbia) Nenad Živanović	Breiðablik	9
10	(Iceland) Ívar Björnsson	Fram	8
10	(Iceland) Hjörtur Júlíus Hjartarson	Þróttur	8
