= Atli Sveinn Þórarinsson =

Icelandic footballer

Personal information
- Full name: Atli Sveinn Þórarinsson
- Date of birth: 24 January 1980 (age 46)
- Place of birth: Iceland
- Height: 1.84 m (6 ft 0 in)
- Position: Defender

Senior career*
Years	Team	Apps	(Gls)
1996–1999	KA	43	(3)
2000–2004	Örgryte IS	44	(0)
2004	KA	17	(4)
2005–2012	Valur	157	(8)
2013–2015	KA	47	(6)
2017	Nökkvi	0	(0)
2018	Ármann	0	(0)

International career^{‡}
1998	Iceland U-19	7	(0)
2001	Iceland U-21	4	(0)
2002–2009	Iceland	9	(0)

Managerial career
- 2016: Dalvík/Reynir
- 2020–2021: Fylkir
- 2022–present: Haukar
- * Club domestic league appearances and goals as of 11 December 2022 ‡ National team caps and goals as of 11 December 2022

Atli Sveinn Þórarinsson (born 24 January 1980) is an Icelandic football coach and former player who played as a defender for KA, Valur and Örgryte.

== Club career ==
Atli Sveinn started his senior team career with KA before going on to play for Örgryte IS and Valur. He finished out his career by playing in the Icelandic Cup with Nökkvi and Ármann.

== National team career ==
Atli Sveinn debuted for the national team in 2002.

== Managerial career ==
Atli Sveinn started his manager career with Dalvík/Reynir in 2016. He was later the manager of Fylkir from 2020 to 2021 with Ólafur Stígsson. In September 2021, he was hired as the manager of Haukar.
