= Kristinn Jakobsson =

Icelandic football referee

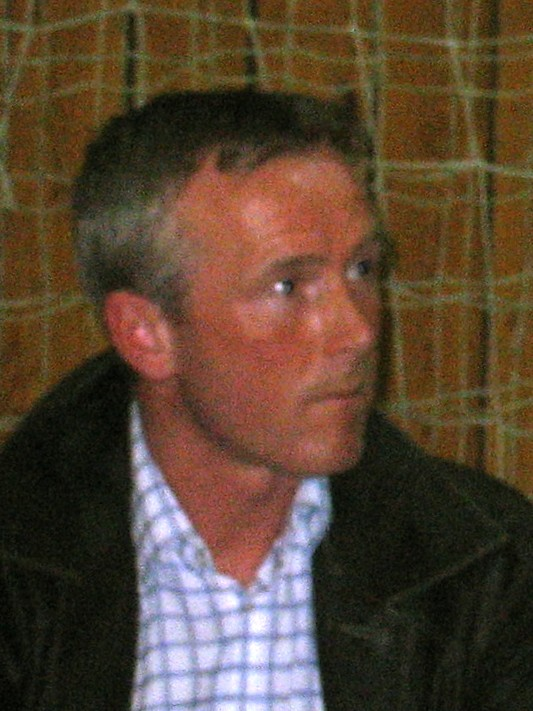
Jakobsson in 2007

Kristinn Jakobsson (born 11 June 1969) is an Icelandic football referee. He has been a FIFA-listed referee since 1997, but did not referee his first UEFA Champions League qualifying match until August 2001, when he took charge of a second qualifying round match between Sloga Jugomagnat and Steaua București. He then refereed a UEFA Cup second round match between Litex Lovech and Union Berlin at the end of October 2001.

In 2008, Jakobsson was named as a fourth official for UEFA Euro 2008, He officiated his first Champions League group stage match on 26 November 2008, taking charge of Shakhtar Donetsk's 5–0 home win over Basel. This made him the first Icelandic referee to officiate in the UEFA Champions League.

When not refereeing, Jakobsson works as the manager/owner of a food company.
