= 2009 Úrvalsdeild =

Úrvalsdeild
- Season: 2009
- Dates: 10 May – 26 September 2009
- Champions: FH
- Relegated: Þróttur; Fjölnir
- Champions League: FH
- Europa League: KR; Fylkir; Breiðablik
- Matches: 132
- Goals: 450 (3.41 per match)
- Top goalscorer: Björgólfur Takefusa (16)
- Biggest home win: Fram 5-0 Keflavík; FH 5-0 ÍBV; Keflavík 6-1 ÍBV
- Biggest away win: Þróttur 0-6 Stjarnan
- Highest scoring: KR 7-3 Stjarnan

The 2009 season of Úrvalsdeild karla was the 98th season of top-tier football in Iceland. It is also known as Pepsideild for sponsoring reasons. It began on 10 May 2009 and ended on 26 September 2009. Defending champions FH earned their second consecutive title. Stjarnan once again joined the elite division of Icelandic football after a 9-year absence, as well as ÍBV who return after a 2-year stint in the 1. deild karla.

== Teams and venues ==
| Club | City | Stadium |
|---|---|---|
| Breiðablik UBK | Kópavogur | Kópavogsvöllur |
| FH Hafnarfjörður | Hafnarfjörður | Kaplakriki |
| Fjölnir | Reykjavík | Fjölnisvöllur |
| Fram | Reykjavík | Laugardalsvöllur |
| Fylkir | Reykjavík | Fylkisvöllur |
| ÍBV Vestmannaeyjar | Vestmannaeyjar | Hásteinsvöllur |
| Keflavík Football Club | Keflavík | Keflavíkurvöllur |
| KR | Reykjavík | KR-völlur |
| Stjarnan | Garðabær | Stjörnuvöllur |
| UMF Grindavík | Grindavík | Grindavíkurvöllur |
| Valur | Reykjavík | Vodafonevöllurinn |
| Þróttur | Reykjavík | Valbjarnarvöllur |

== League table ==
| Pos | Team | Pld | W | D | L | GF | GA | GD | Pts | Qualification or relegation |
|---|---|---|---|---|---|---|---|---|---|---|
| 1 | FH (C) | 22 | 16 | 3 | 3 | 57 | 21 | +36 | 51 | Qualification for the Champions League second qualifying round |
| 2 | KR | 22 | 15 | 3 | 4 | 58 | 31 | +27 | 48 | Qualification for the Europa League first qualifying round |
| 3 | Fylkir | 22 | 13 | 4 | 5 | 41 | 26 | +15 | 43 | Qualification for the Europa League first qualifying round |
| 4 | Fram | 22 | 10 | 4 | 8 | 40 | 32 | +8 | 34 | |
| 5 | Breiðablik | 22 | 10 | 4 | 8 | 38 | 33 | +5 | 34 | Qualification for the Europa League second qualifying round (Note: Breiðablik won the VISA-bikar 2009 competition and have qualified for the second qualifying round of the UEFA Europa League.) |
| 6 | Keflavík | 22 | 8 | 9 | 5 | 38 | 37 | +1 | 33 | |
| 7 | Stjarnan | 22 | 7 | 5 | 10 | 45 | 44 | +1 | 26 | |
| 8 | Valur | 22 | 7 | 4 | 11 | 26 | 43 | −17 | 25 | |
| 9 | Grindavík | 22 | 6 | 4 | 12 | 34 | 44 | −10 | 22 | |
| 10 | ÍBV | 22 | 6 | 4 | 12 | 24 | 45 | −21 | 22 | |
| 11 | Þróttur Reykjavík (R) | 22 | 4 | 4 | 14 | 23 | 48 | −25 | 16 | Relegation to 1. deild karla |
| 12 | Fjölnir (R) | 22 | 3 | 6 | 13 | 27 | 47 | −20 | 15 | Relegation to 1. deild karla |

Source: ksi.is (in Icelandic)
Rules for classification: 1) points; 2) goal difference; 3) number of goals scored.
(C) Champions; (R) Relegated

== Results ==
Each team play every opponent once home and away for a total of 22 matches.

| Home \ Away | BRE | FJÖ | FRA | FYL | GRI | FH | ÍBV | KEF | KR | STJ | VAL | ÞRÓ |
|---|---|---|---|---|---|---|---|---|---|---|---|---|
| Breiðablik | | 0–0 | 3–3 | 1–0 | 3–0 | 2–3 | 3–4 | 4–4 | 0–2 | 2–1 | 0–1 | 2–1 |
| Fjölnir | 0–2 | | 1–2 | 1–3 | 3–2 | 1–4 | 1–3 | 3–3 | 1–2 | 3–1 | 2–0 | 1–3 |
| Fram | 1–1 | 3–1 | | 0–0 | 4–3 | 0–2 | 2–0 | 5–0 | 3–0 | 3–2 | 1–2 | 0–1 |
| Fylkir | 3–1 | 2–2 | 2–1 | | 2–3 | 1–1 | 3–0 | 2–0 | 2–2 | 2–1 | 1–0 | 2–0 |
| Grindavík | 0–1 | 1–1 | 1–3 | 2–3 | | 0–3 | 1–1 | 1–1 | 0–4 | 4–2 | 3–1 | 2–1 |
| FH | 2–1 | 3–0 | 2–1 | 3–2 | 0–3 | | 5–0 | 2–2 | 2–4 | 5–1 | 2–0 | 4–0 |
| ÍBV | 0–1 | 3–1 | 1–1 | 2–3 | 3–1 | 0–3 | | 2–2 | 0–1 | 1–0 | 1–1 | 1–0 |
| Keflavík | 0–3 | 3–1 | 1–0 | 1–0 | 1–0 | 1–0 | 6–1 | | 1–2 | 1–1 | 3–0 | 3–2 |
| KR | 3–2 | 2–1 | 3–1 | 2–4 | 2–0 | 1–2 | 3–0 | 4–1 | | 7–3 | 3–4 | 0–0 |
| Stjarnan | 1–3 | 1–1 | 4–1 | 2–1 | 3–1 | 1–4 | 3–0 | 0–0 | 1–1 | | 3–0 | 5–1 |
| Valur | 0–3 | 3–1 | 1–2 | 0–1 | 1–1 | 0–5 | 2–0 | 2–2 | 2–5 | 3–3 | | 2–1 |
| Þróttur Reykjavík | 4–0 | 1–1 | 1–3 | 1–2 | 1–5 | 0–0 | 2–1 | 2–2 | 1–5 | 0–6 | 0–1 | |

Source: ksi.is (in Icelandic)
Legend: Blue = home team win; Yellow = draw; Red = away team win.

== Top goalscorers ==
| Rank | Player | Club | Goals |
|---|---|---|---|
| 1 | (Iceland) Björgólfur Takefusa | KR | 16 |
| 2 | (Iceland) Atli Viðar Björnsson | FH | 14 |
| 3 | (Iceland) Alfreð Finnbogason | Breiðablik | 13 |
| 4 | (Gabon) Gilles Mbang Ondo | Grindavík | 11 |
| 5 | (Iceland) Atli Guðnason | FH | 10 |
| 5 | (Iceland) Matthías Vilhjálmsson | FH | 10 |
| 7 | (Iceland) Arnar Már Björgvinsson | Stjarnan | 9 |
| 7 | (Iceland) Albert Brynjar Ingason | Fylkir | 9 |
| 9 | (Iceland) Gunnar Örn Jónsson | KR | 8 |
| 9 | (Iceland) Kristinn Steindórsson | Breiðablik | 8 |

Source fotbolti.net (in Icelandic)
