= Kjartan Sturluson =

Icelandic footballer

Personal information
- Full name: Kjartan Sturluson
- Date of birth: 27 December 1975 (age 50)
- Place of birth: Iceland
- Height: 1.95 m (6 ft 5 in)
- Position: Goalkeeper

Senior career*
Years	Team	Apps	(Gls)
1995–2004	Fylkir	175	(0)
2005–2010	Valur	111	(0)

International career
1993	Iceland U19	2	(0)
2002–2008	Iceland	7	(0)
- * Club domestic league appearances and goals

Kjartan Sturluson (born 27 December 1975) is a retired Icelandic international football goalkeeper.
