= 2010 Úrvalsdeild =

Úrvalsdeild
- Season: 2010
- Dates: 10 May – 25 September 2010
- Champions: Breiðablik; 1st title
- Relegated: Haukar; Selfoss
- Champions League: Breiðablik
- Europa League: FH; ÍBV; KR Reykjavík
- Matches: 132
- Goals: 436 (3.3 per match)
- Top goalscorer: 14 goals: Atli Viðar Björnsson; Alfreð Finnbogason; Gilles Mbang Ondo
- Biggest home win: Breiðablik 5–0 Valur (4 August)
- Biggest away win: Haukar 0–5 Stjarnan (16 August)
- Highest scoring: FH 5–3 Keflavík (19 September)
- Longest winning run: 6 games by 2 teams FH (22 August–25 September); KR (25 July–26 August)
- Longest unbeaten run: KR (8 games) (4 July–26 August)
- Longest winless run: Haukar (16 games) (11 May–16 August)
- Longest losing run: 6 games by 2 teams Grindavík (11 May–6 June); Selfoss (31 May–5 July)
- Average attendance: 1205

The 2010 season of Úrvalsdeild was the 99th season of top-tier football in Iceland. It was also known as Pepsideild for sponsoring reasons. It began on 10 May 2010 and ended on 25 September 2010. Breiðablik won their first title, winning the championship on goal difference. Newly promoted sides Haukar and Selfoss were relegated to 1. deild.

== Teams and venues ==
Club	City	Stadium
Breiðablik UBK	Kópavogur	Kópavogsvöllur
FH Hafnarfjörður	Hafnarfjörður	Kaplakriki
Fram	Reykjavík	Laugardalsvöllur
Fylkir	Reykjavík	Fylkisvöllur
Haukar	Hafnarfjörður	Ásvellir / Vodafonevöllurinn
ÍBV Vestmannaeyjar	Vestmannaeyjar	Hásteinsvöllur
Keflavík Football Club	Keflavík	Keflavíkurvöllur
KR	Reykjavík	KR-völlur
Selfoss	Selfoss	Selfossvöllur
Stjarnan	Garðabær	Stjörnuvöllur
UMF Grindavík	Grindavík	Grindavíkurvöllur
Valur	Reykjavík	Vodafonevöllurinn

== League table ==
Pos	Team	Pld	W	D	L	GF	GA	GD	Pts	Qualification or relegation
1	Breiðablik (C)	22	13	5	4	47	23	+24	44	Qualification for the Champions League second qualifying round
2	FH	22	13	5	4	48	31	+17	44	Qualification for the Europa League second qualifying round (Note: FH, winners of the 2010 VISA-bikar competition, will qualify for the second qualifying round of the UEFA Europa League.)
3	ÍBV	22	13	3	6	36	27	+9	42	Qualification for the Europa League first qualifying round
4	KR	22	11	5	6	45	31	+14	38	Qualification for the Europa League first qualifying round
5	Fram	22	9	5	8	35	35	0	32	
6	Keflavík	22	8	6	8	30	32	−2	30	
7	Valur	22	7	7	8	34	41	−7	28	
8	Stjarnan	22	6	7	9	39	42	−3	25	
9	Fylkir	22	7	3	12	36	42	−6	24	
10	Grindavík	22	5	6	11	28	39	−11	21	
11	Haukar (R)	22	4	8	10	29	45	−16	20	Relegation to 1. deild karla
12	Selfoss (R)	22	5	2	15	32	51	−19	17	Relegation to 1. deild karla

Source: ksi.is (in Icelandic)
Rules for classification: 1) points; 2) goal difference; 3) number of goals scored.
(C) Champions; (R) Relegated

== Results ==
Each team play every opponent once home and away for a total of 22 matches.

Home \ Away	BRE	FRA	FYL	GRI	FH	HAU	ÍBV	KEF	KR	SEL	STJ	VAL
Breiðablik		2–2	1–0	2–3	2–0	0–2	1–1	0–1	2–1	3–0	4–0	5–0
Fram	3–1		1–2	2–0	0–3	0–0	2–0	2–1	2–3	3–1	2–1	2–2
Fylkir	2–4	2–2		2–0	2–2	3–0	1–2	1–2	1–4	5–2	3–1	0–1
Grindavík	2–4	3–0	1–2		3–1	1–1	1–2	0–1	3–3	1–1	1–1	1–2
FH	1–1	4–1	4–2	2–1		3–1	2–3	5–3	3–2	2–1	1–3	1–1
Haukar	2–4	2–1	1–1	2–3	0–1		0–3	2–0	3–3	2–3	0–5	2–1
ÍBV	1–1	1–0	2–0	0–1	1–3	3–2		2–1	2–4	3–0	2–1	3–1
Keflavík	0–2	1–1	2–1	1–1	1–1	1–1	4–1		0–1	2–1	2–2	3–1
KR	1–3	2–1	3–0	1–0	0–1	2–2	1–0	0–0		1–2	3–1	1–2
Selfoss	1–3	1–2	1–3	5–2	0–2	3–0	0–2	3–2	0–3		2–2	2–3
Stjarnan	0–0	2–3	2–1	4–0	1–4	2–2	0–2	4–0	2–2	3–2		1–1
Valur	0–2	1–3	5–2	0–0	2–2	2–2	1–1	0–2	1–4	2–1	5–1	

Source: ksi.is (in Icelandic)
Legend: Blue = home team win; Yellow = draw; Red = away team win.

== Top goalscorers ==
Rank	Player	Club	Goals
1	(Iceland) Atli Viðar Björnsson	FH	14
1	(Iceland) Alfreð Finnbogason	Breiðablik	14
1	(Gabon) Gilles Mbang Ondo	Grindavík	14
4	(Iceland) Halldór Orri Björnsson	Stjarnan	13
5	(Iceland) Kristinn Steindórsson	Breiðablik	12
6	(Iceland) Guðjón Baldvinsson	KR	10
7	(Iceland) Tryggvi Guðmundsson	ÍBV	9
7	(Iceland) Jóhann Þórhallsson	Fylkir	9
9	(Iceland) Ívar Björnsson	Fram	8
9	(Iceland) Kjartan Henry Finnbogason	KR	8
9	(Iceland) Arnar Gunnlaugsson	Haukar	8
9	(Iceland) Albert Brynjar Ingason	Fylkir	8
9	(Iceland) Almarr Ormarsson	Fram	8

Source ksi.is (in Icelandic)

== Annual awards ==
As chosen by Úrvalsdeild players in 2010.

2010 Team of the Year
- Player of the year: Alfreð Finnbogason (Breiðablik)
- Young player of the year: Kristinn Steindórsson (Breiðablik)
- Manager of the year: Ólafur Helgi Kristjánsson (Breiðablik)
- Referee of the year: Gunnar Jarl Jónsson
- Fair play team of the year: Breiðablik
- Fair play player of the year: Fjalar Þorgeirsson
- Supporters of the year: Selfoss

=== Team of the Year ===
- Goalkeeper: Ingvar Þór Kale (Breiðablik)
- Defence: Kristinn Jónsson, Elfar Freyr Helgason (both Breiðablik), Jón Guðni Fjóluson ( Fram Reykjavík), James Hurst (ÍBV Vestmannaeyjar)
- Midfield: Ólafur Páll Snorrason (FH), Kristinn Steindórsson, Jökull Elísabetarson (both Breiðablik), Baldur Sigurðsson (KR Reykjavík)
- Attack: Alfreð Finnbogason (Breiðablik), Atli Viðar Björnsson (FH)

== See also ==
- 2010 in Icelandic football
