= Matthías Guðmundsson =

Icelandic footballer

Personal information
- Full name: Matthías Guðmundsson
- Date of birth: 1 August 1980 (age 46)
- Place of birth: Reykjavík, Iceland
- Height: 1.82 m (6 ft 0 in)
- Position: Winger

Youth career
- Valur

Senior career*
Years	Team	Apps	(Gls)
1999–2006	Valur	130	(29)
2006—2009	FH	48	(10)
2009—2014	Valur	65	(9)
2014	Haukar	16	(1)
2017	KH	1	(0)

International career
1996—1997	Iceland U-17	9	(1)
2001	Iceland U-21	3	(0)
2006–2009	Iceland	4	(0)
- * Club domestic league appearances and goals as of 18 April 2018

Matthías Guðmundsson (born 1 August 1980) is an Icelandic former footballer who played as a winger.

== International career ==
Guðmundsson made his debut for Iceland at the age of 26 in an August 2006 friendly match against Spain, coming on as a substitute for Gunnar Heiðar Þorvaldsson. He has been capped four times.
