= 2005 Úrvalsdeild =

Úrvalsdeild
- Season: 2005
- Dates: 19 May – 21 September 2005
- Champions: FH
- Relegated: Fram; Þróttur
- Champions League: FH
- UEFA Cup: Valur; ÍA
- Intertoto Cup: Keflavík
- Matches played: 90
- Goals scored: 265 (2.94 per match)
- Top goalscorer: Tryggvi Guðmundsson (16)

The 2005 season of Landsbankadeildin was the 94th season of league football in Iceland. FH defended their title. Fram and recently promoted Þróttur were relegated.

== Final league table ==
Pos	Team	Pld	W	D	L	GF	GA	GD	Pts	Qualification or relegation
1	FH (C)	18	16	0	2	53	11	+42	48	Qualification for the Champions League first qualifying round
2	Valur	18	10	2	6	29	16	+13	32	Qualification for the UEFA Cup first qualifying round
3	ÍA	18	10	2	6	24	20	+4	32	Qualification for the UEFA Cup first qualifying round
4	Keflavík	18	7	6	5	28	31	−3	27	Qualification for the Intertoto Cup first round
5	Fylkir	18	8	2	8	28	28	0	26	
6	KR	18	8	1	9	22	24	−2	25	
7	Grindavík	18	5	3	10	23	41	−18	18	
8	ÍBV	18	5	2	11	18	30	−12	17	
9	Fram (R)	18	5	2	11	19	32	−13	17	Relegation to 1. deild karla
10	Þróttur (R)	18	4	4	10	21	32	−11	16	Relegation to 1. deild karla

Source: RSSSF.com
Rules for classification: 1) points; 2) goal difference; 3) number of goals scored.
(C) Champions; (R) Relegated

== Results ==
Each team played every opponent once home and away for a total of 18 matches.

Home \ Away	FH	FRA	FYL	GRI	ÍA	ÍBV	ÍBK	KR	VAL	ÞRÓ
FH		3–1	1–2	8–0	2–0	3–0	2–0	2–0	2–0	3–1
Fram	1–5		1–2	0–1	0–0	3–0	2–3	0–4	2–1	3–0
Fylkir	2–5	1–1		2–1	2–3	1–0	0–1	1–2	1–2	0–1
Grindavík	1–5	3–1	3–0		1–3	2–1	2–1	0–0	0–1	1–1
ÍA	2–1	1–2	0–3	3–2		2–0	1–2	2–1	1–2	1–0
ÍBV	0–1	2–0	0–3	5–1	0–2		2–3	2–1	1–0	2–0
Keflavík	0–3	2–1	2–2	1–1	0–1	2–2		2–1	1–5	3–3
KR	0–1	1–0	1–3	3–1	0–2	1–0	1–3		2–0	3–2
Valur	0–1	3–0	3–1	3–1	2–0	1–1	0–0	3–0		1–2
Þróttur	1–5	0–1	1–2	3–2	0–0	4–0	2–2	0–1	0–2	

Legend: Blue = home team win; Yellow = draw; Red = away team win.

== Top goalscorers ==
Rank	Player	Club	Goals
1	(Iceland) Tryggvi Guðmundsson	FH	16
2	(Denmark) Allan Borgvardt	FH	13
3	(Iceland) Hörður Sveinsson	Keflavík	9
4	(Iceland) Garðar Gunnlaugsson	Valur	8
5	(Iceland) Guðmundur Steinarsson	Keflavík	7
5	(Iceland) Matthías Guðmundsson	Valur	7
7	(Iceland) Grétar Hjartarson	KR	6
7	(Iceland) Björgólfur Takefusa	Fylkir	6
7	(Iceland) Hjörtur J. Hjartarson	ÍA	6

2005 Landsbankadeild winners
FH
2nd title
