= Helgi Sigurðsson =

Icelandic footballer and manager (born 1974)

Personal information
- Date of birth: 17 September 1974 (age 52)
- Place of birth: Reykjavík, Iceland
- Height: 1.85 m (6 ft 1 in)
- Position: Forward

Team information
- Current team: Fram (assistant)

Senior career*
| Years | Team | Apps | (Gls) |
| 1990–1992 | Víkingur Reykjavik | 24 | (11) |
| 1993–1994 | Fram | 36 | (23) |
| 1994–1996 | VfB Stuttgart | 2 | (0) |
| 1996–1997 | Tennis Borussia Berlin | 14 | (6) |
| 1997 | Fram | 5 | (1) |
| 1997–1999 | Stabæk | 52 | (26) |
| 1999–2001 | Panathinaikos | 32 | (10) |
| 2001–2003 | Lyn | 52 | (13) |
| 2003–2006 | AGF | 41 | (8) |
| 2006 | Fram | 18 | (13) |
| 2007–2009 | Valur | 56 | (29) |
| 2010–2012 | Víkingur Reykjavik | 49 | (14) |
| 2013 | Fram | 2 | (0) |
| 2013–2014 | Afturelding | 9 | (3) |

International career
| 1990–1991 | Iceland U-16 | 13 | (5) |
| 1991–1993 | Iceland U-18 | 20 | (10) |
| 1992–1995 | Iceland U-21 | 10 | (3) |
| 1993–2008 | Iceland | 62 | (10) |

Managerial career
- 2017–2019: Fylkir
- 2019–2021: ÍBV
- 2023–: Fram (assistant)
- * Club domestic league appearances and goals

Helgi Sigurðsson (born 17 September 1974) is an Icelandic former professional footballer and assistant coach at Fram. A forward, he played for clubs in Iceland, Germany, Norway, Greece, and Denmark and represented Iceland at international level.

== Club career ==
Helgi was born in Reykjavík, Iceland. He started his career at Víkingur Reykjavik and won the Icelandic championship with them in 1991. He then moved to Knattspyrnufélagið Fram before signing for VfB Stuttgart in Germany.

Joined Stabæk in 1997 and won the Norwegian Football Cup final with them in 1998, scoring two of three of Stabæk's goals.

In 1999, he moved to Panathinaikos in Greece, nicknamed the Shark. He played one game in the Champions League for Panathinaikos, coming on as a sub for Nikolaos Lymperopoulos against Valencia.

He signed for Danish club AGF in February 2004. In 2006, he returned to Iceland and signed for Knattspyrnufélagið Fram for the second time in his career. A year later he left Fram and signed for their Reykjavík rivals, Valur.

He was a key player for Valur when in 2007 they won their 20th league title and their first in 20 years. He had a great season, playing all 18 league games and scoring 12 goals. He was picked player of the season in Landsbankadeildin for the 2007 season.

He returned to his youth club, Víkingur Reykjavik before the 2010 season. Before the 2013 season he left Víkingur and became assistant manager at Fram while also playing 2 games for the club. Early in the 2013 season the Fram manager quit and Helgi quit after that.

== International career ==
He made his debut for Iceland in an August 1993 friendly match against the USA as a substitute for Arnór Guðjohnsen and has been capped 62 times since and scored 10 goals. He also scored his first international goal against the US, in April 1994, earning his 4th cap. His last match was a 3–0 friendly win against Faroe Islands in 2008.

== Managerial career ==
In mid-season 2015, Helgi teamed up with his home club Víkingur Reykjavik taking the role of assistant manager alongside manager Miloš Milojević. Helgi then became Icelandic champion with Víkingur U18 team in September 2016. Winning a convincing 1–0 win over Breiðablik in the final.

After the 2016 season, Helgi was released from his post at Víkingur to take the role of manager at Fylkir.
