= Haukar =

Icelandic sports club

- Full name: Knattspyrnufélagið Haukar
- Founded: 12 April 1931; 95 years ago
- Chairman: Magnús Gunnarsson

Knattspyrnufélagið Haukar (Icelandic pronunciation: [ˈkʰnahtˌspɪ(r)tnʏˌfjɛːˌlaijɪð ˈhøyːkar̥], lit. 'Hawks Football Club' (Note: Knattspyrnufélagið is the definite form of Knattspyrnufélag, meaning "the football club".)) is an Icelandic multi-sport club from Hafnarfjörður with divisions in Football, Handball, Basketball, Rugby union, Karate, Skiing & Chess.

== Club history ==
The club was founded on 12 April 1931, when 13 young boys got together in a local KFUM (Icelandic YMCA) house to form a new athletic club in the town. At the club's 3rd meeting, they decided that it would be named Knattspyrnufélagið Haukar.

== Facilities ==
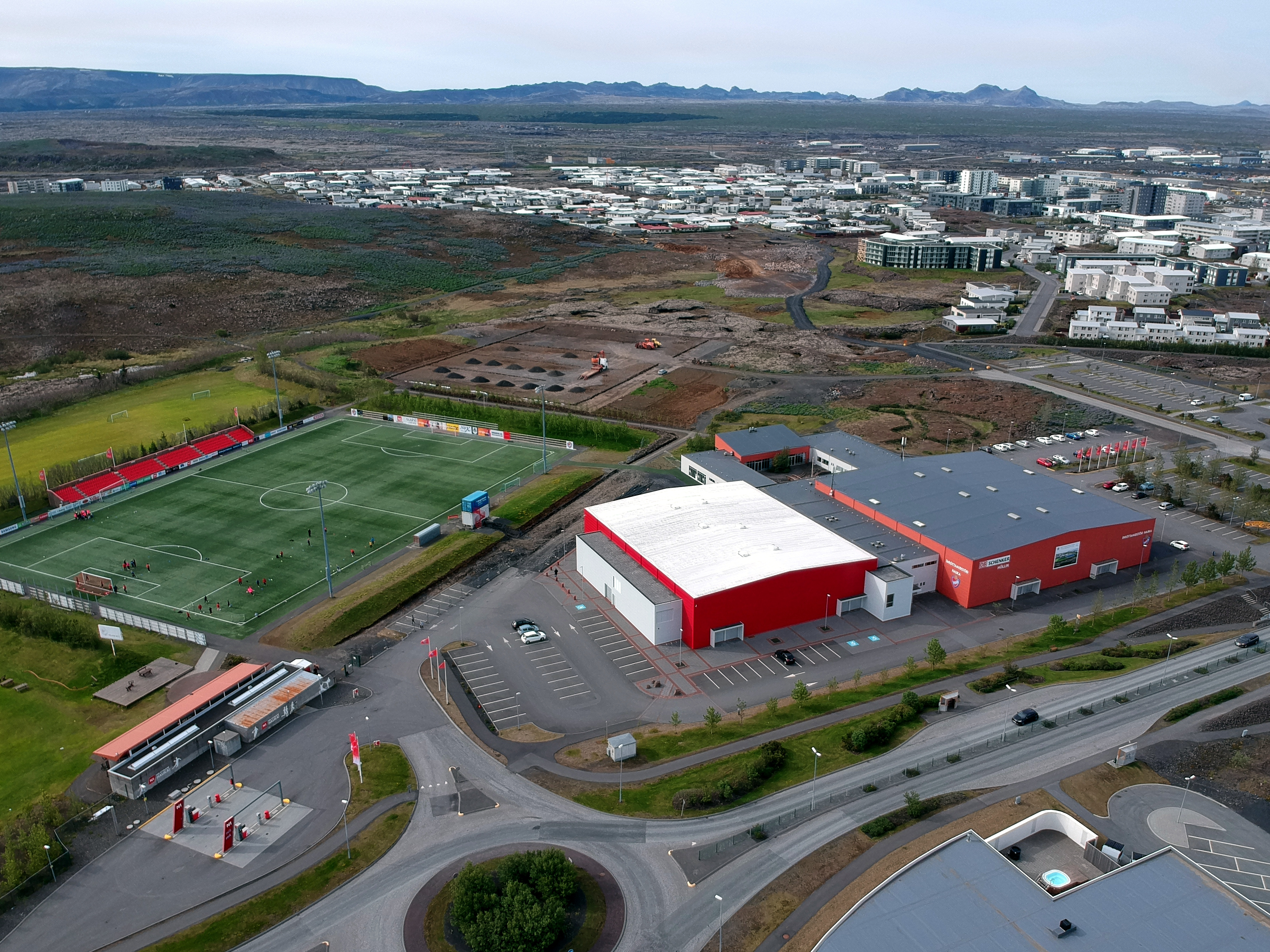
Haukar facilities in Hafnarfjörður.

Haukar's home is Ásvellir which has a purpose-built arena for Handball and Basketball as well as a grass and artificial turf field for the Football team. It was built in 1999.

On 8 October 2009, it was announced that Haukar would play home games in the Pepsi-Deildin at Valur's Vodafonevöllurinn for the next three seasons, to be reviewed at the end of each season.

At the same time it was announced that a stand with seating for 500 would be built at Haukar's artificial turf to meet with the regulations of the female Pepsi-Deildin.

== Basketball ==
=== Men's basketball ===
The Haukar men's basketball team have won one Icelandic championships. They currently play in Úrvalsdeild karla.

=== Women's basketball ===
The Haukar's women's basketball team have won 4 national championships, the last coming in 2018. They currently play in Úrvalsdeild kvenna.

== Football ==
=== Men's football ===
In 2010, Haukar were promoted to the Úrvalsdeild karla for the first time in 31 years. They finished second to last in the league during the 2010 season and were relegated back to 1. deild karla.

=== Women's football ===
The Haukar's women's football team currently plays in the 1. deild kvenna, the second-tier women's football league in Iceland, after being relegated from Úrvalsdeild kvenna in 2017.
