= 2007 Úrvalsdeild =

Úrvalsdeild
- Season: 2007
- Dates: 12 May – 29 September 2007
- Champions: Valur
- Relegated: Vikingur
- Champions League: Valur
- UEFA Cup: FH; ÍA
- Intertoto Cup: Fylkir
- Matches: 90
- Goals: 269 (2.99 per match)
- Top goalscorer: Jónas Grani Garðarsson (13)

The 2007 season of Úrvalsdeild karla was the 96th season of top tier football in Iceland. HK were playing for the first time in Landsbankadeild. The league was expanded from 10 teams to 12 teams after the 2007 season, therefore only one team was relegated and 3 were promoted from the 1. deild karla. The first match day of the season was on 12 May. Valur won the league for the first time in 20 years and Vikingur were relegated to 1. deild karla.

Fram's Jónas Grani Garðarsson was the top scorer with 13 goals.

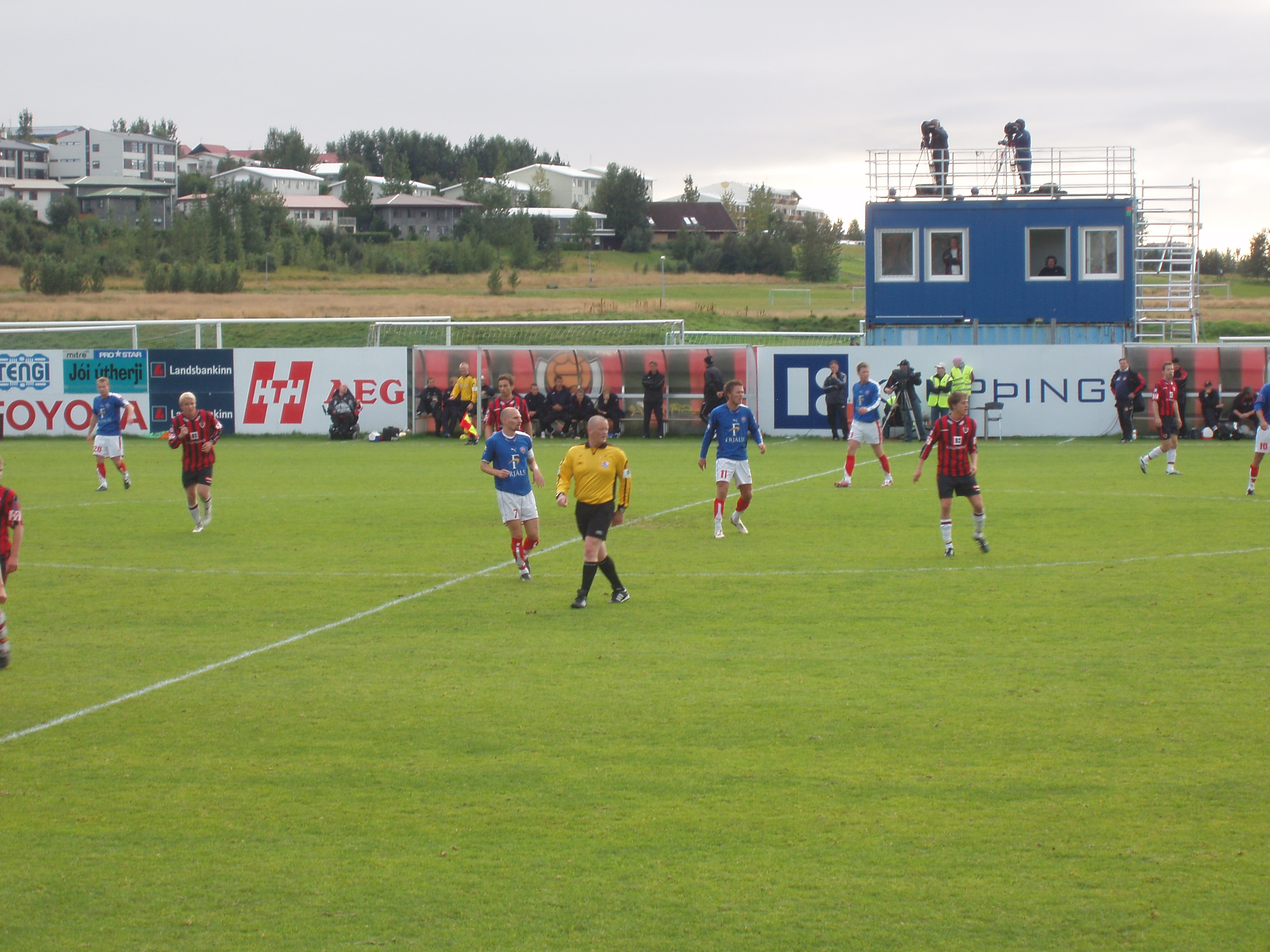
Picture of the Vikingur vs Valur match in August 2007

== Final league table ==
Pos	Team	Pld	W	D	L	GF	GA	GD	Pts	Qualification or relegation
1	Valur (C)	18	11	5	2	41	20	+21	38	Qualification for the Champions League first qualifying round
2	FH	18	11	4	3	42	26	+16	37	Qualification for the UEFA Cup first qualifying round
3	ÍA	18	8	6	4	34	27	+7	30	Qualification for the UEFA Cup first qualifying round
4	Fylkir	18	8	5	5	23	18	+5	29	Qualification for the Intertoto Cup first round
5	Breiðablik	18	5	9	4	29	20	+9	24	
6	Keflavík	18	5	6	7	26	32	−6	21	
7	Fram	18	3	7	8	25	31	−6	16	
8	KR	18	3	7	8	17	30	−13	16	
9	HK	18	4	4	10	17	35	−18	16	
10	Vikingur (R)	18	3	5	10	15	30	−15	14	Relegation to 1. deild karla

Rules for classification: 1) points; 2) goal difference; 3) number of goals scored.
(C) Champions; (R) Relegated

== Results ==
Each team played every opponent once home and away for a total of 18 matches.

Home \ Away	BRE	FH	FRA	FYL	HK	ÍA	ÍBK	KR	VAL	VÍK
Breiðablik		4–3	2–2	0–1	3–0	3–0	2–2	1–1	0–0	1–1
FH	2–1		3–3	0–0	4–0	1–1	3–2	5–1	0–2	4–1
Fram	1–0	0–2		3–1	3–0	2–4	2–2	1–1	0–2	0–2
Fylkir	0–3	1–2	1–1		1–0	2–2	4–0	0–0	1–2	1–0
HK	1–1	2–2	2–1	1–2		1–0	2–1	2–0	1–4	2–2
ÍA	2–1	2–3	2–2	0–2	4–1		2–1	3–1	2–1	1–0
Keflavík	0–3	1–2	2–1	1–0	3–0	3–3		1–1	1–3	0–0
KR	1–1	0–2	2–1	1–1	3–2	1–1	1–2		0–3	1–2
Valur	2–2	4–1	1–1	2–4	1–0	2–2	2–2	2–1		3–1
Vikingur	1–1	1–3	2–1	0–1	0–0	0–3	1–2	0–1	1–5	

Legend: Blue = home team win; Yellow = draw; Red = away team win.

== Top goalscorers ==
Rank	Player	Club	Goals
1	(Iceland) Jónas Grani Garðarsson	Fram	13
2	(Iceland) Helgi Sigurðsson	Valur	12
3	(Iceland) Tryggvi Guðmundsson	FH	8
3	(Serbia) Siniša Valdimar Kekić	Vikingur	8
3	(Iceland) Magnús Páll Gunnarsson	Breiðablik	8
6	(Iceland) Bjarni Guðjónsson	ÍA	7
6	(Croatia) Vjekoslav Svadumović	ÍA	7
6	(Iceland) Hjálmar Þórarinsson	Fram	7
9	(Netherlands) Prince Rajcomar	Breiðablik	6
9	(Iceland) Matthías Vilhjálmsson	FH	6
9	(Iceland) Arnar Gunnlaugsson	FH	6
9	(Faroe Islands) Símun Samuelsen	Keflavík	6
9	(Iceland) Matthías Guðmundsson	FH	6
