= Tryggvi Guðmundsson =

Icelandic footballer

Personal information
- Date of birth: 30 July 1974 (age 52)
- Place of birth: Vestmannaeyjar, Iceland
- Height: 1.75 m (5 ft 9 in)
- Position: Striker

Youth career
- –1991: ÍBV

Senior career*
Years	Team	Apps	(Gls)
1992–1993	ÍBV	23	(12)
1994	KR	13	(3)
1995–1997	ÍBV	52	(41)
1998–2000	Tromsø IL	76	(36)
2001–2003	Stabæk	66	(24)
2004	Örgryte IS	22	(3)
2005–2009	FH	92	(51)
2005	→ Stoke City (loan)	0	(0)
2010–2012	ÍBV	52	(22)
2013	Fylkir	9	(2)
2013	HK	10	(5)
2014–2015	KFS	25	(17)
2015	Njarðvík	10	(3)
2016–2017	KFS	7	(4)
2017–2018	Kórdrengir	3	(0)
Total		460	(223)

International career
1994–1995	Iceland U21	9	(0)
1997–2008	Iceland	41	(12)
2011	Iceland futsal	3	(2)

Managerial career
- 2015: ÍBV (assistant)
- 2019: Vængir Júpiters (assistant)
- 2021: Kormákur/Hvöt
- * Club domestic league appearances and goals

Tryggvi Guðmundsson (born 30 July 1974) is an Icelandic former professional footballer. He is Iceland's all-time top scorer in the Úrvalsdeild. He is the highest scoring male Icelandic footballer of all time in association football with 296 goals credited to his name.

== Club career ==
A prolific striker, Tryggvi started his career at ÍBV before moving abroad to clubs in Norway and Sweden. After an unsuccessful loan spell at Stoke City, he returned to Iceland.

== International career ==
Tryggvi made his debut for Iceland in a July 1997 friendly match against the Faroe Islands, coming on as a second-half substitute for Ríkharður Daðason and scoring the only goal of the match. In 2001, he scored his only hat-trick for his country against India in the Millennium Super Soccer Cup. He has scored twelve goals in 42 appearances, his last appearance coming in a 2–1 away friendly win against Slovakia in March 2008.

== Managerial career ==
Tryggvi was an assistant manager for ÍBV in 2015 and Vængir Júpiters in 2019. In 2021, he was hired as the manager of Kormákur/Hvöt.

== Career statistics ==
=== Club ===
Appearances and goals by club, season and competition
Club	Season	League			Cup		Total	
Club	Season	Division	Apps	Goals	Apps	Goals	Apps	Goals
ÍBV	1992	Úrvalsdeild	6	0	—		6	0
ÍBV	1993	Úrvalsdeild	17	12	—		17	2
ÍBV	Total		23	12	—		23	12
KR	1994	Urvalsdeild	13	3	—		13	3
ÍBV	1995	Urvalsdeild	18	14	—		18	14
ÍBV	1996	Urvalsdeild	16	8	—		16	8
ÍBV	1997	Urvalsdeild	18	19	—		18	19
ÍBV	Total		52	41	—		52	41
Tromsø IL	1998	Tippeligaen	25	8	—		25	8
Tromsø IL	1999	Tippeligaen	26	13	—		26	13
Tromsø IL	2000	Tippeligaen	25	15	—		25	15
Tromsø IL	Total		76	36	—		76	36
Stabæk	2001	Tippeligaen	26	7	—		26	7
Stabæk	2002	Tippeligaen	25	15	—		25	15
Stabæk	2003	Tippeligaen	15	2	—		15	2
Stabæk	Total		66	24	—		66	24
Örgryte IS	2004	Allsvenskan	22	3	—		22	3
FH	2005	Urvalsdeild	17	16	—		17	16
FH	2006	Urvalsdeild	17	8	—		17	8
FH	2007	Urvalsdeild	17	8	—		17	8
FH	2008	Urvalsdeild	21	12	—		21	12
FH	2009	Urvalsdeild	20	7	—		20	7
FH	Total		92	51	—		92	51
Stoke City (loan)	2004–05	Championship	0	0	0	0	0	0
ÍBV	2010	Urvalsdeild	21	9	—		21	9
ÍBV	2011	Urvalsdeild	20	10	—		20	10
ÍBV	2012	Urvalsdeild	11	3	—		11	3
ÍBV	Total		52	22	—		52	22
Fylkir	2013	Urvalsdeild	9	2	—		9	2
HK	2013	2. deild karla	10	5	—		10	5
KFS	2014	4. deild karla	14	15	—		14	15
KFS	2015	3. deild karla	8	2	—		8	2
KFS	Total		22	17	—		22	17
Njarðvík	2015	2. deild karla	10	3	—		10	3
KFS	2016	3. deild karla	7	4	—		7	4
Kórdrengir	2017	4. deild karla	3	0	—		3	0
Career total			457	223	0	0	457	223

=== International ===
Appearances and goals by national team and year
National team	Year	Apps	Goals
Iceland	1997	6	3
Iceland	1998	2	0
Iceland	1999	4	0
Iceland	2000	8	0
Iceland	2001	6	5
Iceland	2002	2	0
Iceland	2003	3	1
Iceland	2004	2	0
Iceland	2005	3	1
Iceland	2008	5	2
Total		41	12

Scores and results list Iceland's goal tally first, score column indicates score after each Guðmundsson goal.

List of international goals scored by Tryggvi Guðmundsson
No.	Date	Venue	Opponent	Score	Result	Competition
1	27 July 1997	Sindravellir, Höfn, Iceland	Faroe Islands	1–0	1–0	Friendly
2	20 August 1997	Sportpark Eschen-Mauren, Eschen, Liechtenstein	Liechtenstein	4–0	4–0	1998 FIFA World Cup qualification
3	11 October 1997	Laugardalsvöllur Reykjavík, Iceland	Liechtenstein	2–0	4–0	1998 FIFA World Cup qualification
4	13 January 2001	Jawaharlal Nehru Stadium, Kochi, India	India	1–0	3–0	Millennium Super Soccer Cup
5	13 January 2001	Jawaharlal Nehru Stadium, Kochi, India	India	2–0	3–0	Millennium Super Soccer Cup
6	13 January 2001	Jawaharlal Nehru Stadium, Kochi, India	India	3–0	3–0	Millennium Super Soccer Cup
7	25 April 2001	Ta' Qali National Stadium, Ta'Qali, Malta	Malta	1–1	4–1	2002 FIFA World Cup qualification
8	2 June 2001	Laugardalsvöllur, Reykjavík, Iceland	Malta	1–0	3–0	2002 FIFA World Cup qualification
9	7 June 2003	Laugardalsvöllur, Reykjavik, Iceland	Faroe Islands	2–1	2–1	UEFA Euro 2004 qualification
10	8 June 2005	Laugardalsvöllur, Reykjavik, Iceland	Malta	3–1	4–1	2006 FIFA World Cup qualification
11	6 February 2008	Ta' Qali National Stadium, Ta'Qali, Malta	Armenia	1–0	2–0	2008 Malta International Football Tournament
12	16 March 2008	Kórinn, Kópavogur, Iceland	Faroe Islands	3–0	3–0	Friendly
