= 2006 Úrvalsdeild =

Úrvalsdeild
- Season: 2006
- Dates: 14 May – 23 September 2006
- Champions: FH
- Relegated: ÍBV
- Champions League: FH
- UEFA Cup: KR; Keflavík
- Intertoto Cup: Valur
- Matches: 90
- Goals: 250 (2.78 per match)
- Top goalscorer: Marel Baldvinsson (11)

The 2006 season of Úrvalsdeild was the 95th season of league football in Iceland. FH defended their title making them the fifth club in Icelandic football history to win the championship three years running. ÍBV were relegated for the first time in 16 years and Grindavík suffered relegation for the first time in the club's history. An attendance record was set this season as 98,026 people saw the 90 matches, an average of 1,089.17 people per match.

== Final league table ==
Pos	Team	Pld	W	D	L	GF	GA	GD	Pts	Qualification or relegation
1	FH (C)	18	10	6	2	31	14	+17	36	Qualification for the Champions League first qualifying round
2	KR	18	9	3	6	23	27	−4	30	Qualification for the UEFA Cup first qualifying round
3	Valur	18	7	8	3	27	18	+9	29	Qualification for the Intertoto Cup first round
4	Keflavík	18	6	6	6	30	20	+10	24	Qualification for the UEFA Cup first qualifying round
5	Breiðablik	18	6	5	7	27	33	−6	23	
6	ÍA	18	6	4	8	27	30	−3	22	
7	Víkingur	18	5	6	7	21	18	+3	21	
8	Fylkir	18	5	6	7	22	25	−3	21	
9	Grindavík (R)	18	4	7	7	24	26	−2	19	Relegation to 1. deild karla
10	ÍBV (R)	18	5	3	10	18	39	−21	18	Relegation to 1. deild karla

Source: RSSSF
Rules for classification: 1) points; 2) goal difference; 3) number of goals scored.
(C) Champions; (R) Relegated

== Results ==
Each team played every opponent once home and away for a total of 18 matches.

Home \ Away	BRE	FH	FYL	GRI	ÍA	ÍBV	ÍBK	KR	VAL	VÍK
Breiðablik		1–1	3–2	2–3	2–2	4–1	2–1	0–1	2–1	1–0
FH	1–1		2–2	2–0	2–1	3–1	2–1	2–0	1–2	4–0
Fylkir	1–1	1–2		2–1	3–3	1–1	2–1	1–2	0–1	1–0
Grindavík	4–2	1–1	1–1		3–2	0–0	1–1	5–0	1–1	1–1
ÍA	2–1	0–1	0–1	2–1		4–2	1–0	1–2	1–1	1–4
ÍBV	0–1	1–1	2–0	2–1	2–1		2–1	2–0	0–3	0–1
Keflavík	5–0	2–1	1–1	2–0	0–1	6–2		3–0	1–1	2–1
KR	3–2	0–3	1–0	3–0	2–3	2–0	2–2		1–1	1–0
Valur	1–1	0–2	3–1	2–1	2–1	5–0	0–0	2–2		0–0
Víkingur	4–1	0–0	0–2	0–0	1–1	5–0	1–1	0–1	3–1	

Source: RSSSF
Legend: Blue = home team win; Yellow = draw; Red = away team win.

== Top goalscorers ==
The player who has scored the most goals at the end of each tournament receives the Icelandic Golden Boot.

Rank	Player	Club	Goals
1	(Iceland) Marel Baldvinsson	Breiðablik	11
2	(Iceland) Björgólfur Hideaki Takefusa	KR	10
2	(Iceland) Jóhann Þórhallsson	Grindavík	10
4	(Iceland) Viktor Bjarki Arnarsson	Víkingur R.	8
4	(Iceland) Tryggvi Guðmundsson	FH	8
6	(Iceland) Stefán Örn Arnarson	Keflavík	6
6	(Iceland) Sævar Þór Gíslason	Fylkir	6
6	(Iceland) Guðmundur Steinarsson	Keflavík	6
6	(Iceland) Pálmi Rafn Pálmason	Valur	6

Source: RSSSF

== Promoted teams ==
These two teams were promoted from 1. deild karla at the start of the season:

- Breiðablik
- Víkingur

These two teams will be promoted from 1. deild karla at the start of next season:

- Handknattleiksfélag Kópavogs (HK)
- Fram

== Relegated teams ==
These two teams were relegated to 1. deild karla at the end of the season:

- ÍBV
- Grindavík

2006 Landsbankadeild winners

3rd title
