= Kaplakriki =

Multi-purpose stadium in Hafnarfjörður, Iceland

Coordinates: 64°04′33″N 21°56′19″W

Kaplakrikavöllur
- Krikinn
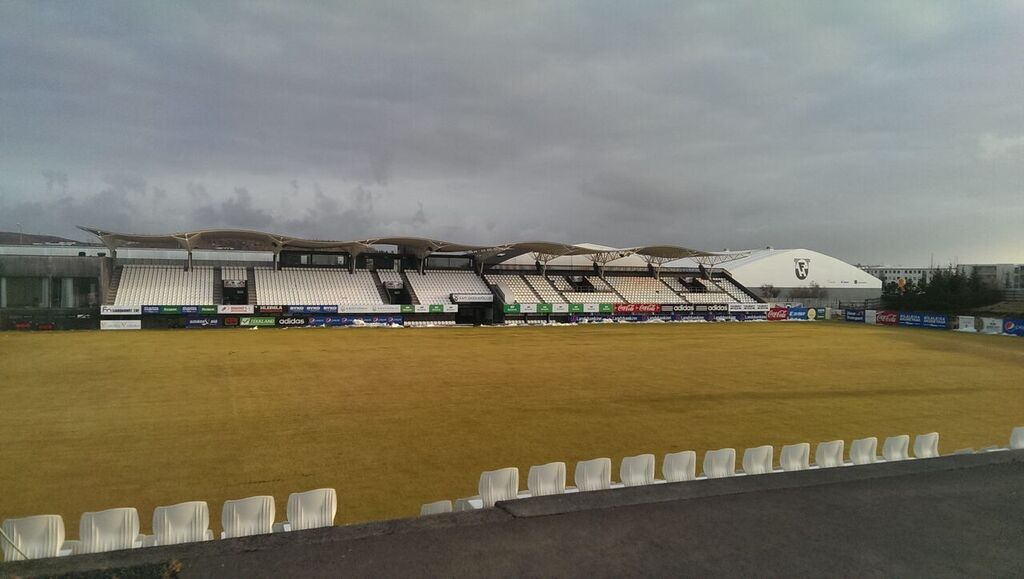
- Stadion des FH Hafnarfjörður
- Interactive map of Kaplakrikavöllur
- Location: Kaplakrika IS-220; Hafnarfjörður, Iceland
- Owner: Fimleikafélag Hafnarfjarðar
- Capacity: 6.450 (3,050 seated)
- Surface: Grass

Construction
- Opened: 1973
- Renovated: 2011

Tenants
- Fimleikafélag Hafnarfjarðar, Iceland national football team Iceland women's national football team Iceland U21; Iceland U19

Kaplakriki is a multi-purpose stadium in Hafnarfjörður, Iceland. It is currently used mostly for football matches and is the home stadium of Fimleikafélag Hafnarfjarðar.

The stadium holds over 6,000 spectators and has offers 3,050 seats. The plan for the stadium development is to expand the seating capacity to over 4,000 seats taking the maximum capacity to over 7,000. Long-term plans though are to make the stadium an all-seater, full square stadium with around 6,000 seats and roofs over the stands.

Kaplakriki Stadium is a part of multi-sport complex which besides a state-of-the-art stadium, includes a multi functional sports arena which mainly is used for handball and as a concert venue. The handball arena holds over 3,000 seated spectators in seats and was one of the venues for the 1995 World Men's Handball Championship and has hosted several national games. A state-of-the-art track and field arena was opened in 2014 and will serve as an all season facility and an expansion to the outdoor track and field course located at Kaplakriki complex.

Kaplakriki is also a large training area which includes an indoor-football facility called Risinn (The Giant) although it is not as big as Fífan or Egilshöll, which are other indoor football facilities located in Kópavogur and Reykjavík.

In the 2016 league season, FH drew an average home attendance of 1,541, the highest in the league.

== See also ==
- List of football stadiums in Iceland
