= 2015 Fimleikafélag Hafnarfjarðar season =

Fimleikafélag Hafnarfjarðar (FH)
2015 season
- Manager: Heimir Guðjónsson
- Stadium: Kaplakriki
- Úrvalsdeild: 1st
- Borgunarbikarinn: Quarter-finals
- Lengjubikarinn: Quarter-finals
- Europa League: Second qualifying round
- Top goalscorer: League: Steven Lennon (9); All: Steven Lennon (17)
Home colours	Away colours

The 2015 season was FH's 31st season in Úrvalsdeild and their 15th consecutive season in top-flight of Icelandic Football.

Along with the Úrvalsdeild, the club competed in the Lengjubikarinn, the Borgunarbikarinn and the 2015–16 UEFA Europa League were they entered in the first qualifying round.

Heimir Guðjónsson head coached the team for the 8th consecutive season after having signed a new 2-year contract on 14 October 2014.

On 26 September FH were crowned champions after a 2–1 win over Fjölnir with one game to spare. This was FH's 7th league title.

== First team ==
=== Current squad ===
As of 24 July 2015. These players competed in Úrvalsdeild, Borgunarbikarinn, Lengjubikarinn, Europa League

Note: Flags indicate national team as defined under FIFA eligibility rules; some limited exceptions apply. Players may hold more than one non-FIFA nationality.

No.	Pos.	Nation	Player
1	GK	(Iceland) ISL	Róbert Örn Óskarsson
4	DF	(England) ENG	Sam Tillen
5	DF	(Iceland) ISL	Pétur Viðarsson
6	DF	(England) ENG	Sam Hewson
7	FW	(Scotland) SCO	Steven Lennon
8	MF	(Iceland) ISL	Emil Pálsson
9	MF	(Iceland) ISL	Þórarinn Ingi Valdimarsson
10	MF	(Iceland) ISL	Davíð Þór Viðarsson (Captain)
11	FW	(Iceland) ISL	Atli Guðnason
12	GK	(Iceland) ISL	Kristján Finnbogason
13	MF	(Iceland) ISL	Bjarni Þór Viðarsson
15	DF	(Iceland) ISL	Guðmann Þórisson
16	DF	(Iceland) ISL	Jón Ragnar Jónsson

No.	Pos.	Nation	Player
17	FW	(Iceland) ISL	Atli Viðar Björnsson
18	FW	(Iceland) ISL	Kristján Flóki Finnbogason
19	MF	(Iceland) ISL	Viktor Helgi Benediktsson
20	DF	(Mali) MLI	Kassim Doumbia
21	DF	(Iceland) ISL	Böðvar Böðvarsson
22	MF	(Belgium) BEL	Jeremy Serwy
23	MF	(Iceland) ISL	Brynjar Ásgeir Guðmundsson
24	MF	(Iceland) ISL	Grétar Snær Gunnarsson
26	DF	(Belgium) BEL	Jonathan Hendrickx
27	MF	(Iceland) ISL	Baldur Búi Heimisson
29	MF	(Iceland) ISL	Eggert Georg Tómasson
30	MF	(Iceland) ISL	Hörður Ingi Gunnarsson

== Transfers and loans ==
=== Transfers in ===
Date	Position	No.	Player	From club	Other	Ref
24 October 2014	MF		(Iceland) Finnur Orri Margeirsson	(Iceland) Breiðablik		
25 November 2014	MF	9	(Iceland) Þórarinn Ingi Valdimarsson	(Iceland) ÍBV		
4 February 2015	MF	13	(Iceland) Bjarni Þór Viðarsson	(Denmark) Silkeborg IF		
4 February 2015	MF	22	(Belgium) Jeremy Serwy	(Hungary) Újpest FC		
4 February 2015	MF	29	(Iceland) Eggert Georg Tómasson	(Iceland) Leiknir F		
20 February 2015	DF	15	(Iceland) Guðmann Þórisson	(Sweden) Mjällby AIF		
11 March 2015	FW	25	(Senegal) Amath Diedhiou	(Moldova) Sheriff Tiraspol		
24 March 2015	FW	18	(Iceland) Kristján Flóki Finnbogason	(Denmark) FC Copenhagen		
25 June 2015	MF	8	(Iceland) Emil Pálsson	(Iceland) Fjölnir	Back from Loan	
23 July 2015	FW	25	(Senegal) Amath Diedhiou	(Iceland) Leiknir R	Back from Loan	
24 July 2015	FW	15	(Iceland) Indriði Áki Þorláksson	(Iceland) Fram	Back from Loan	

=== Transfers out ===
Date	Position	No.	Player	To club	Other	Ref
16 October 2014	MF	25	(Iceland) Hólmar Örn Rúnarsson	(Iceland) Keflavík		
29 October 2014	MF	22	(Iceland) Ólafur Páll Snorrason	(Iceland) Fjölnir		
30 October 2014	MF	7	(Iceland) Ingimundur Níels Óskarsson	(Iceland) Fylkir		
8 November 2014	DF	3	(Iceland) Guðjón Árni Antoníusson	(Iceland) Keflavík		
13 January 2015	DF	2	(United States) Sean Michael Reynolds	(United States) Louisville City FC		
16 January 2015	DF	26	(Iceland) Aron Lloyd Green	(Iceland) Þróttur R		
17 January 2015	MF		(Iceland) Finnur Orri Margeirsson	(Norway) Lillestrom SK		
21 February 2015	DF		(Iceland) Steinar Aron Magnússon	(Iceland) Höttur		
10 March 2015	DF	24	(Iceland) Ási Þórhallsson	(Iceland) Sindri		

=== Loans out ===
Start Date	End Date	Position	No.	Player	To Club	Ref
25 March 2015	25 June 2015	MF	8	(Iceland) Emil Pálsson	(Iceland) Fjölnir	
28 March 2015	16 October 2015	FW	18	(Iceland) Ingvar Ásbjörn Ingvarsson	(Iceland) Austri	
31 March 2015	24 July 2015	FW	15	(Iceland) Indriði Áki Þorláksson	(Iceland) Keflavík	
15 May 2015	23 July 2015	FW	25	(Senegal) Amath Diedhiou	(Iceland) Leiknir R	
23 July 2015	16 October 2015	MF	28	(Iceland) Sigurður Gísli Snorrason	(Iceland) Fram	
24 July 2015	16 October 2015	FW	25	(Senegal) Amath Diedhiou	(Iceland) BÍ/Bolungarvík	
24 July 2015	16 October 2015	FW	15	(Iceland) Indriði Áki Þorláksson	(Iceland) Fram	

== Preseason ==
=== Fótbolti.net Cup ===
FH took part in the 2015 Fótbolti.net Cup, a pre-season tournament for clubs outside of Reykjavík. The team played in Group 1 along with ÍA, Breiðablik and Þróttur R. FH finished second in the group with 6 points, 2 wins and 1 defeat.

FH played Keflavík in the 3rd place final and lost on penalties after the game had ended 1–1.

Date	Round	Opponents	Stadium	Result F–A	Scorers
10 January 2015	Group stage	Breiðablik	Fífan	1–2	Jeremy Serwy 61'
13 January 2015	Group stage	Þróttur R	Egilshöll	7–1	OG 6' Jeremy Serwy 10' Atli Viðar 12' 33' 59' Emil Páls 50' Steven Lennon 84'
24 January 2015	Group stage	ÍA	Akraneshöllin	2–1	Brynjar Ásgeir Guðmundsson ?' ?'
31 January 2015	3rd place final	Keflavík	Reykjaneshöllin	1–1 (5–3)	Atli Viðar 8'

== Lengjubikarinn ==
FH came into the 2015 Lengjubikarinn as defending champions. They were drawn in Group 1 along with Breiðablik, Fylkir, ÍBV, Þróttur R, Víkingur Ó, BÍ/Bolungarvík and HK. FH won 4 and lost 2 of their first 6 games in the group. In the seventh round FH defeated Þróttur R 3–2 and booked their place in the quarter-finals as the third placed team with the best results. Kristján Flóki scored his first goal for the team in the game.

On 16 April FH were eliminated by Víkingur R after a penalty shootout 4–1. The game had finished 1–1 with Kassim Doumbia scoring FH's only goal.

Date	Round	Opponents	Stadium	Result F–A	Scorers
17 February 2015	Group stage	HK	Kórinn	1–2	Atli Guðna 67'(p.)
24 February 2015	Group stage	ÍBV	Akraneshöllin	2–0	Sam Hewson 25' Brynjar Ásgeir 89'
1 March 2015	Group stage	Víkingur Ó	Akraneshöllin	4–0	Guðmann 21' Atli Viðar 37' Steven Lennon 61' 64
7 March 2015	Group stage	BÍ/Bolungarvík	Akraneshöllin	1–0	Atli Guðna 20'
22 March 2015	Group stage	Fylkir	Egilshöll	2–1	Atli Guðna 62'(p.) Steven Lennon 65'
28 March 2015	Group stage	Breiðablik	Fífan	0–3	
10 April 2015	Group stage	Þróttur R	Laugardalur	3–2	Steven Lennon 16' Sigðurður Gísli 40' Kristján Flóki 60'
16 April 2015	Quarter-finals	Víkingur R	Víkingsvöllur	1–1 (1–4p.)	Kassim Doumbia 29'

== Úrvalsdeild ==
=== League table ===
Pos	Team	Pld	W	D	L	GF	GA	GD	Pts	Qualification or relegation
1	FH (C)	22	15	3	4	47	26	+21	48	Qualification for the Champions League second qualifying round
2	Breiðablik	22	13	7	2	34	13	+21	46	Qualification for the Europa League first qualifying round
3	KR	22	12	6	4	36	21	+15	42	Qualification for the Europa League first qualifying round
4	Stjarnan	22	9	6	7	32	24	+8	33	
5	Valur	22	9	6	7	38	31	+7	33	Qualification for the Europa League first qualifying round (Note: Valur qualified for the UEFA Europa League first qualifying round by winning the 2015 Icelandic Cup.)

Source: KSÍ, Soccerway
Rules for classification: 1) Points; 2) Goal difference; 3) Goals scored; 4) Head-to-head points; 5) Head-to-head goal difference; 6) Head-to-head goals scored; 7) Head-to-head away goals scored; 8) Play-off (only for deciding champion); 9) Draw.
(C) Champions

=== Matches ===
Win Draw Loss Upcoming fixture

4 May 2015 1	KR	1–3	FH	Reykjavík
19:15 GMT	Jacob Schoop 50'; Pálmi Rafn Pálmason (yellow card) 37'; Gonzalo Balbi Lorenzo (yellow card) 39'; Skúli Jón Friðgeirsson (yellow card) 45'	Report	Kristján Flóki Finnbogason 73' (yellow card) 89'; Atli Guðnason 85' 90'; Sam Hewson (yellow card) 26'; Bjarni Þór Viðarsson (yellow card) 31'	Stadium: KR-völlur; Attendance: 2558; Referee: Garðar Örn Hinriksson

10 May 2015 2	FH	2–0	Keflavík	Hafnarfjörður
19:15 GMT	Atli Viðar Björnsson 70'; Steven Lennon 82'; Guðmann Þórisson (yellow card) 83'	Report	Sigurbergur Elísson (yellow card) 61'; Sindri Snær Magnússon (yellow card) 79'; Kiko Insa (red card) 83'	Stadium: Kaplakrikavöllur; Attendance: 2014; Referee: Þóroddur Hjaltalín

17 May 2015 3	Valur	2–0	FH	Reykjavík
19:15 GMT	Sigurður Egill Lárusson 59' 66' (yellow card) 85'; Baldvin Sturluson (yellow card) 16'	Report	Pétur Viðarsson (yellow card) 22'	Stadium: Vodafonevöllurinn; Attendance: 1343; Referee: Gunnar Jarl Jónsson

20 May 2015 4	FH	4–1	ÍA	Hafnarfjörður
19:15 GMT	Atli Viðar Björnsson 29'; Brynjar Ásgeir Guðmundsson 39'; Arnór Snær Guðmundsson 56' (o.g.); Jeremy Serwy 73'; Pétur Viðarsson (yellow card) 60'	Report	Arsenij Buinickij 79'; Albert Hafsteinsson (yellow card) 71'	Stadium: Kaplakrikavöllur; Attendance: 1632; Referee: Vilhjálmur Alvar Þórarinsson

26 May 2015 5	Stjarnan	1–1	FH	Garðabær
20:00 GMT	Ólafur Karl Finsen 6'	Report	Kassim Doumbia 60'; Pétur Viðarsson (yellow card) 64'; Sam Hewson (yellow card) 86'; Þórarinn Ingi Valdimarsson (yellow card) 90+3'	Stadium: Samsung völlurinn Attendance: 2264; Referee: Garðar Örn Hinriksson

31 May 2015 6	FH	4–2	Leiknir R	Hafnarfjörður
19:15 GMT	Steven Lennon 6' 29' 93' (pen.); Atli Guðnason 66'; Davíð Þór Viðarsson (yellow card) 31'; Böðvar Böðvarsson (yellow card) 58'; Bjarni Þór Viðarsson (yellow card) 92'	Report	Ólafur Hrannar Kristjánsson 19'; Hilmar Árni Halldórsson 71'; Kristján Páll Jónsson (yellow card) 75'; Eyjólfur Tómasson (yellow card) 93'	Stadium: Kaplakrikavöllur; Attendance: 2034; Referee: Valdimar Pálsson

7 June 2015 7	Víkingur R	0–1	FH	Reykjavík
19:15 GMT	Dofri Snorrason (yellow card) 45'; Tómas Guðmundsson (yellow card) 68'; Igor Taskovic (yellow card) 68'; Arnþór Ingi Kristinsson (yellow card) 78'	Report	Bjarni Þór Viðarsson 51'; Davíð Þór Viðarsson (yellow card) 45'; Kassim Doumbia (yellow card) 58'	Stadium: Víkingsvöllur; Attendance: 1531; Referee: Erlendur Eiríksson

14 June 2015 8	ÍBV	1–4	FH	Vestmannaeyjar
17:00 GMT	Aron Bjarnason 56'; Mees Junior Siers (yellow card) 69'	Report	Kristján Flóki Finnbogason 22' 81' 95' (yellow card) 45'; Steven Lennon 38' (yellow card) 69'; Bjarni Þór Viðarsson (yellow card) 86'; Þórarinn Ingi Valdimarsson (yellow card) 89'	Stadium: Hásteinsvöllur; Attendance: 766; Referee: Vilhjálmur Alvar Þórarinsson

21 June 2015 9	FH	1–1	Breiðablik	Hafnarfjörður
20:00 GMT	Kassim Doumbia 93'; Þórarinn Ingi Valdimarsson (yellow card) 35'; Böðvar Böðvarsson (yellow card) 65'; Jón Ragnar Jónsson (yellow card) 82'; Bjarni Þór Viðarsson (red card) 91'	Report	Arnþór Ari Atlason 69'; Guðjón Pétur Lýðsson (yellow card) 79'	Stadium: Kaplakrikavöllur; Attendance: 2843; Referee: Gunnar Jarl Jónsson

28 June 2015 10	Fjölnir	1–3	FH	Reykjavík
20:00 GMT	Guðmundur Karl Guðmundsson 40'; Ólafur Páll Snorrason (yellow card) 43'; Ragnar Leósson (yellow card) 47'	Report	Þórarinn Ingi Valdimarsson 37'; Jeremy Serwy 76'; Atli Guðnason 83'; Pétur Viðarsson (yellow card) 39'; Böðvar Böðvarsson (yellow card) 85'	Stadium: Fjölnisvöllur; Attendance: 1204; Referee: Eiler Rasmussen

12 July 2015 11	FH	2–2	Fylkir	Hafnarfjörður
19:15 GMT	Böðvar Böðvarsson 57'; Brynjar Ásgeir Guðmundsson 91'; Jeremy Serwy (yellow card) 60'; Jonathan Hendrickx (yellow card) 61'; Davíð Þór Viðarsson (yellow card) 78'	Report	Ásgeir Örn Arnþórsson 47'; Kjartan Ágúst Breiðdal 92'; Ragnar Bragi Sveinsson (yellow card) 45'; Jóhannes Karl Guðjónsson (yellow card) 53'; Hákon Ingi Jónsson (yellow card) 72'	Stadium: Kaplakrikavöllur; Attendance: 1689; Referee: Erlendur Eiríksson

19 July 2014 12	FH	1–3	KR	Hafnarfjörður
20:00 GMT	Emil Pálsson 11'; Sam Tillen (yellow card) 24'; Guðmann Þórisson (yellow card) 48'; Kassim Doumbia (yellow card) 78'; Atli Viðar Björnsson (yellow card) 81'	Report	Hólmbert Friðjónsson 56' (pen.); Gary Martin 58'; Óskar Örn Hauksson 68'; Jónas Guðni Sævarsson (yellow card) 19'; Rasmus Christiansen (yellow card) 48'; Gunnar Þór Gunnarsson (yellow card) 84'	Stadium: Kaplakrikavöllur; Attendance: 2435; Referee: Gunnar Jarl Jónsson

28 July 2015 13	Keflavík	1–2	FH	Keflavík
19:15 GMT	Own goal 44'; Samuel Jimenez Hernandez (yellow card) 45+2'	Report	Emil Pálsson 32'; Atli Viðar Björnsson 74'; Kristján Flóki Finnbogason (yellow card) 36'; Bjarni Þór Viðarsson (yellow card) 70'; Jonathan Hendrickx (yellow card) 72'	Stadium: Nettóvöllurinn; Attendance: 1240; Referee: Valgeir Valgeirsson

5 August 2015 14	FH	2–1	Valur	Hafnarfjörður
19:15 GMT	Atli Viðar Björnsson 45+1'; Bjarni Þór Viðarsson 81'; Emil Pálsson (yellow card) 74'	Report	Sigurður Egill Lárusson 67'; Mathias Schlie (yellow card) 38'; Haukur Páll Sigurðsson (yellow card) 57'	Stadium: Kaplakrikavöllur; Attendance: 1907; Referee: Þóroddur Hjaltalín

10 August 2015 15	ÍA	2–3	FH	Akranes
19:15 GMT	Arnar Már Guðjónsson 4'; Garðar Gunnlaugsson 81'; Ingimar Elí Hlynsson (yellow card) 25'; Ólafur Valur Valdimarsson (yellow card) 65'; Marko Andelkovic (red card) 90+2'	Report	Atli Viðar Björnsson 24' 53'; Emil Pálsson 50'; Jonathan Hendrickx (yellow card) 46'; Kassim Doumbia (yellow card) 51'; Róbert Örn Óskarsson (yellow card) 90+1'	Stadium: Norðurálsvöllurinn; Attendance: 879; Referee: Garðar Örn Hinriksson

17 August 2015 16	FH	4–0	Stjarnan	Hafnarfjörður
18:30 GMT	Atli Viðar Björnsson 11'; Bjarni Þór Viðarsson 23'; Atli Guðnason 49'; Emil Pálsson 67'; Steven Lennon (yellow card) 83'	Report	Þorri Geir Rúnarsson (yellow card) 48'; Halldór Orri Björnsson (yellow card) 76'; Jóhann Laxdal (yellow card) 83'	Stadium: Kaplakrikavöllur; Attendance: 2097; Referee: Erlendur Eiríksson

24 August 2015 17	Leiknir R	0–1	FH	Reykjavík
18:00 GMT	Ólafur Hrannar Kristjánsson (yellow card) 45'; Eyjólfur Tómasson (yellow card) 64'; Brynjar Hlöðversson (yellow card) 66'; Eiríkur Ingi Magnússon (yellow card) 68'	Report	Steven Lennon 90+3'; Þórarinn Ingi Valdimarsson (yellow card) 30'	Stadium: Leiknisvöllur; Attendance: 680; Referee: Ívar Orri Kristjánsson

30 August 2015 18	FH	1–0	Víkingur R	Hafnarfjörður
18:00 GMT	Steven Lennon 40' (pen.); Pétur Viðarsson (yellow card) 45+3'; Davíð Þór Viðarsson (yellow card) 47'; Bjarni Þór Viðarsson (yellow card) 60'; Jonathan Hendrickx (yellow card) 77'; Böðvar Böðvarsson (yellow card) 90'	Report	Viktor Bjarki Arnarsson (yellow card) 45+3'; Vladimir Tufegdzic (yellow card) 62'	Stadium: Kaplakrikavöllur; Attendance: 1236; Referee: Pétur Guðmundsson

13 September 2015 19	FH	3–1	ÍBV	Hafnarfjörður
17:00 GMT	Steven Lennon 25' 79' (pen.); Atli Guðnason 48'; Þórarinn Ingi Valdimarsson (yellow card) 9'	Report	Ian Jeffs 15'; Mees Junior Siers (yellow card) 13'; Stefán Ragnar Guðlaugsson (yellow card) 79'; Jose Enrique Seoane Vergara (yellow card) 87'	Stadium: Kaplakrikavöllur; Attendance: 1487; Referee: Þóroddur Hjaltalín

20 September 2015 20	Breiðablik	2–1	FH	Kópavogur
16:30 GMT	Jonathan Glenn 74'; Damir Muminovic 77' (yellow card) 36'; Arnþór Ari Atlason (yellow card) 50'; Oliver Sigurjónsson (yellow card) 90+4'	Report	Atli Guðnason 72'; Pétur Viðarsson (yellow card) 40'; Jonathan Hendrickx (yellow card) 85'; Kristján Flóki Finnbogason (yellow card) 90+1'; Davíð Þór Viðarsson (yellow card) 90+3'	Stadium: Kópavogsvöllur; Attendance: 1643; Referee: Þorvaldur Árnason

26 September 2015 21	FH	2–1	Fjölnir	Hafnarfjörður
14:00 GMT	Atli Guðnason 50' (yellow card) 60'; Emil Pálsson 79'; Pétur Viðarsson (yellow card) 89'	Report	Kennie Chopart 69'; Bergsveinn Ólafsson (yellow card) 87'	Stadium: Kaplakrikavöllur; Attendance: 1798; Referee: Erlendur Eiríksson

3 October 2015 22	Fylkir	3–2	FH	Reykjavík
14:00 GMT	Andrés Már Jóhannesson 12'; Ingimundur Níels Óskarsson 25'; Tonci Radovinkovic 54'; Ásgeir Börkur Ásgeirsson (yellow card) 66'	Report	Atli Viðar Björnsson 23'; Emil Pálsson 72'; Kristján Flóki Finnbogason (yellow card) 38'	Stadium: Fylkisvöllur; Attendance: 593; Referee: Gunnar Jarl Jónsson

=== Results ===
Overall								Home						Away					
Pld	W	D	L	GF	GA	GD	Pts	W	D	L	GF	GA	GD	W	D	L	GF	GA	GD
22	15	3	4	47	26	+21	48	8	2	1	26	12	+14	7	1	3	21	14	+7

Last updated: 3 October 2015.
Source: KSÍ

=== Points breakdown ===
- Points at home: 26
- Points away from home: 22
- 6 Points: Keflavík, ÍA, Leiknir R, Víkingur R, ÍBV, Fjölnir
- 4 Points: Stjarnan
- 3 Points: KR, Valur
- 2 Points:
- 1 Point: Breiðablik, Fylkir
- 0 Points:

== Borgunarbikarinn ==
FH came into the Icelandic cup, Borgunarbikarinn, in the 32nd-finals and were drawn against HK. FH won the game 2–1 with all the goals coming in the first half. In the 16th finals FH was drawn against Grindavík. FH won the game 2–1 with 2 goals from Steven Lennon, both coming from the penalty spot. In the quarter-finals FH was drawn against KR. FH lost the game 2–1.

Win Draw Loss Upcoming fixture

3 June 2014 32nd-finals	FH	2–1	HK	Hafnarfjörður
19:15 GMT	Steven Lennon 33'; Þórarinn Ingi Valdimarsson 45'	Report	Guðmundur Atli Steinþórsson 5' (pen.); Davíð Magnússon (yellow card) 72'	Stadium: Kaplakrikavöllur; Attendance: 352; Referee: Vilhjálmur Alvar Þórarinsson

18 June 2014 16th-finals	FH	2–1	Grindavík	Hafnarfjörður
19:15 GMT	Steven Lennon 8' (pen.) 35' (pen.); Jeremy Serwy (yellow card) 75'	Report	Hákon Ívar Ólafsson 87'; Óli Baldur Bjarnason (yellow card) 9'; Jósef Kristinn Jósefsson (yellow card) 78'	Stadium: Kaplakrikavöllur; Referee: Valgeir Valgeirsson

5 July 2014 Quarter finals	KR	2–1	FH	Reykjavík
19:15 GMT	Óskar Örn Hauksson 15'; Gary Martin 61'; Pálmi Rafn Pálmason (yellow card) 57'	Report	Kassim Doumbia 17' (yellow card) 89'; Davíð Þór Viðarsson (yellow card) 76'; Emil Pálsson (yellow card) 82'; Sam Tillen (yellow card) 91'	Stadium: Alvogenvöllurinn; Referee: Garðar Örn Hinriksson

== Europa League ==
FH came into the 2015–16 UEFA Europa League in the 1st qualifying round.

On 22 June FH was drawn against the Finnish team SJK Seinäjoki. FH won the first leg, away from home, 1–0. Steven Lennon scored the only goal. In the second leg FH also won 1–0 winning the tie 2–0 on aggregate. Kristján Flóki scored the winning goal on the 91st minute.

In the second qualifying round FH was drawn against Inter Baku PIK from Azerbaijan. In the first leg FH lost 2–1, they started the game well and went ahead on the 39th minute courtesy of a penalty goal from Atli Guðnason, this was Atli's 11th goal in a European competition making him the highest scoring player for an Icelandic team in European competitions. In the second half Róbert Örn got sent off and Inter Baku PIK equalised from the penalty spot, Kristján Finnbogason came on in goal at the age of 44 years. FH couldn't hang on to a draw and Inter Baku PIK scored the winning goal on the 61st minute. In the second leg FH managed to equalise the tie 3–3 with goals from Þórarinn Ingi and Kristján Flóki but lost the game in extra time. As in the first leg FH got a man sent off when Kristján Flóki wrongly got his second yellow card on the 56th minute.

=== First qualifying round ===
2 July 2015 First leg	SJK Seinäjoki (Finland)	0–1	(Iceland) FH	Helsinki, Finland
18:00 CET	Johannes Laaksonen (yellow card) 29'; Mehmet Hetemaj (yellow card) 57'; Cedric Gogoua (yellow card) 62'	Report	Steven Lennon 56'; Pétur Viðarsson (yellow card) 24'	Stadium: Sonera Stadium; Referee: (Croatia) Tihomir Pejin

9 July 2015 Second leg	FH (Iceland)	1–0 (2–0 agg.)	(Finland) SJK Seinäjoki	Hafnarfjörður, Iceland
21:15 CET	Kristján Flóki Finnbogason 91'; Pétur Viðarsson (yellow card) 13'; Davíð Þór Viðarsson (yellow card) 49'	Report	Henri Aalto (yellow card) 62'; Cedric Gogoua (yellow card) 73'; Pavle Milosavljevic (yellow card) 76'	Stadium: Kaplakrikavöllur; Referee: (Northern Ireland) Mervyn Smyth

=== Second qualifying round ===
16 July 2015 First leg	FH (Iceland)	1–2	(Azerbaijan) Inter Baku PIK	Hafnarfjörður, Iceland
21:15 CET	Atli Guðnason 39'; Böðvar Böðvarsson (yellow card) 19'; Jonathan Hendrickx (yellow card) 48'; Róbert Örn Óskarsson (red card) 50'; Davíð Þór Viðarsson (yellow card) 66'; Kassim Doumbia (yellow card) 79'; Kristján Flóki Finnbogason (yellow card) 89'	Report	Nika Kvekveskiri 54'; Dhiego Martins 61'; Fuad Bayramov (yellow card) 39'; Zurab Khizanishvili (yellow card) 48'	Stadium: Kaplakrikavöllur; Referee: (Sweden) Michael Lerjeus

23 July 2015 Second leg	Inter Baku PIK (Azerbaijan)	2–2 (a.e.t.) (3–4 agg.)	(Iceland) FH	Baku, Azerbaijan
18:00 CET	Abbas Huseynov 46'; Rauf Aliyev 91' (yellow card) 101'; Salahat Agayev (yellow card) 112'	Report	Þórarinn Ingi Valdimarsson 47' (yellow card) 84'; Kristján Flóki Finnbogason 52' (yellow card) 40' (yellow card) 55' (red card); Emil Pálsson (yellow card) 79'; Pétur Viðarsson (yellow card) 92'	Stadium: Inter Arena; Referee: (Ukraine) Yaroslav Kozyk

== Statistics ==
=== Goalscorers ===
Includes all competitive matches.

As of match played 3 October 2015

Rank	Pos.	No.	Player	Úrvalsdeild	Borgunarbikar	Lengjubikar	Europa League	Total
1	FW	7	(Scotland) Steven Lennon	9	3	4	1	17
2	FW	11	(Iceland) Atli Guðnason	8	0	3	1	12
3	FW	17	(Iceland) Atli Viðar Björnsson	8	0	1	0	9
4	FW	18	(Iceland) Kristján Flóki Finnbogason	4	0	1	2	7
5	MF	8	(Iceland) Emil Pálsson	6	0	0	0	6
6	DF	20	(Mali) Kassim Doumbia	2	1	1	0	4
7	MF	23	(Iceland) Brynjar Ásgeir Guðmundsson	2	0	1	0	3
8	MF	9	(Iceland) Þórarinn Ingi Valdimarsson	1	1	0	1	3
9	MF	13	(Iceland) Bjarni Þór Viðarsson	3	0	0	0	3
10	MF	22	(Belgium) Jeremy Serwy	2	0	0	0	2
11	DF	15	(Iceland) Guðmann Þórisson	0	0	1	0	1
12	MF	6	(England) Sam Hewson	0	0	1	0	1
13	MF	28	(Iceland) Sigurður Gísli Snorrason	0	0	1	0	1
14	DF	21	(Iceland) Böðvar Böðvarsson	1	0	0	0	1

=== Appearances ===
Includes all competitive matches. Numbers in parentheses are sub-appearances.

As of match played 3 October 2015

No.	Pos.	Player	Úrvalsdeild	Borgunarbikar	Lengjubikar	Europa League	Total
1	GK	(Iceland) Róbert Örn Óskarsson	22	3	8	3	36
4	DF	(England) Sam Tillen	3 (5)	3	3 (3)	1	18
5	DF	(Iceland) Pétur Viðarsson	19	2	5	4	30
6	MF	(England) Sam Hewson	7	1	6 (1)	0	15
7	FW	(Scotland) Steven Lennon	14 (4)	3	5 (3)	2	31
8	MF	(Iceland) Emil Pálsson	12	(1)	3 (2)	4	22
9	MF	(Iceland) Þórarinn Ingi Valdimarsson	10 (8)	2 (1)	6	4	31
10	MF	(Iceland) Davíð Þór Viðarsson	21	3	4 (1)	4	33
11	FW	(Iceland) Atli Guðnason	20 (1)	2	8	4	35
12	GK	(Iceland) Kristján Finnbogason	0	0	(1)	1 (1)	3
13	MF	(Iceland) Bjarni Þór Viðarsson	15 (4)	2	2	2 (2)	27
15	DF	(Iceland) Guðmann Þórisson	6 (1)	1	4	3	15
16	DF	(Iceland) Jón Ragnar Jónsson	9 (4)	(1)	1 (2)	0	17
17	FW	(Iceland) Atli Viðar Björnsson	7 (11)	(2)	4 (2)	(1)	27
18	FW	(Iceland) Kristján Flóki Finnbogason	8 (12)	1 (2)	2	(4)	29
19	MF	(Iceland) Viktor Helgi Benediktsson	0	0	0	0	0
20	DF	(Mali) Kassim Doumbia	14 (1)	3	5 (3)	4	30
21	DF	(Iceland) Böðvar Böðvarsson	19	0	5 (2)	3 (1)	30
22	MF	(Belgium) Jeremy Serwy	18 (3)	3	5 (1)	1	31
23	MF	(Iceland) Brynjar Ásgeir Guðmundsson	7 (5)	3	5 (2)	1 (1)	24
24	MF	(Iceland) Grétar Snær Gunnarsson	0	0	0	0	0
25	FW	(Senegal) Amath Diedhiou	0	0	0	0	0
26	DF	(Belgium) Jonathan Hendrickx	11	0	6	3	20
27	MF	(Iceland) Baldur Búi Heimisson	0	0	(1)	0	1
28	MF	(Iceland) Sigurður Gísli Snorrason	(2)	1	1 (6)	0	10
29	MF	(Iceland) Eggert Georg Tómasson	0	0	(1)	0	1
30	MF	(Iceland) Hörður Ingi Gunnarsson	0	0	0	0	0
	FW	(Iceland) Indriði Áki Þorláksson	0	0	(3)	0	3
	FW	(Iceland) Ingvar Ásbjörn Ingvarsson	0	0	(1)	0	1

=== Disciplinary record ===
Includes all competitive matches.

As of match played 3 October 2015

No.	Pos.	Player	Úrvalsdeild			Borgunarbikar			Lengjubikar			Europa League			Total		
No.	Pos.	Player	Yellow card	Second yellow card	Red card	Yellow card	Second yellow card	Red card	Yellow card	Second yellow card	Red card	Yellow card	Second yellow card	Red card	Yellow card	Second yellow card	Red card
1	GK	(Iceland) Róbert Örn Óskarsson	1	0	0	0	0	0	1	0	0	0	0	1	2	0	1
4	DF	(England) Sam Tillen	1	0	0	1	0	0	0	0	0	0	0	0	2	0	0
5	DF	(Iceland) Pétur Viðarsson	7	0	0	0	0	0	1	0	1	3	0	0	11	0	1
6	MF	(England) Sam Hewson	2	0	0	0	0	0	3	0	0	0	0	0	5	0	0
7	FW	(Scotland) Steven Lennon	2	0	0	0	0	0	2	0	0	0	0	0	4	0	0
8	MF	(Iceland) Emil Pálsson	1	0	0	1	0	0	0	0	0	1	0	0	3	0	0
9	MF	(Iceland) Þórarinn Ingi Valdimarsson	5	0	0	0	0	0	0	0	0	1	0	0	6	0	0
10	MF	(Iceland) Davíð Þór Viðarsson	5	0	0	1	0	0	1	0	0	1	0	0	9	0	0
11	FW	(Iceland) Atli Guðnason	1	0	0	0	0	0	0	0	0	0	0	0	1	0	0
13	MF	(Iceland) Bjarni Þór Viðarsson	5	0	1	0	0	0	1	0	0	0	0	0	6	0	1
15	DF	(Iceland) Guðmann Þórisson	2	0	0	0	0	0	0	0	0	0	0	0	2	0	0
16	DF	(Iceland) Jón Ragnar Jónsson	1	0	0	0	0	0	0	0	0	0	0	0	1	0	0
17	FW	(Iceland) Atli Viðar Björnsson	1	0	0	0	0	0	0	0	0	0	0	0	1	0	0
18	FW	(Iceland) Kristján Flóki Finnbogason	5	0	0	0	0	0	1	0	0	2	1	0	8	1	0
20	DF	(Mali) Kassim Doumbia	3	0	0	1	0	0	1	0	0	1	0	0	6	0	0
21	DF	(Iceland) Böðvar Böðvarsson	4	0	0	0	0	0	3	1	0	1	0	0	8	1	0
22	MF	(Belgium) Jeremy Serwy	1	0	0	1	0	0	1	0	0	0	0	0	3	0	0
26	MF	(Belgium) Jonathan Hendrickx	5	0	0	0	0	0	3	0	0	1	0	0	9	0	0

=== Squad stats ===
Includes all competitive matches; Úrvalsdeild, Borgunarbikar, Lengjubikar and UEFA Europa League.

	Úrvalsdeild	Borgunarbikar	Lengjubikar	Europe	Total
Games played	22	3	8	4	37
Games won	15	2	5	2	24
Games drawn	3	0	1	1	5
Games lost	4	1	2	1	8
Goals scored	47	5	14	5	71
Goals conceded	26	4	9	4	43
Clean sheets	5	0	3	2	10
Yellow cards	52	5	18	13	88
Red cards	1	0	2	2	5

Last updated: 3 October 2015
Source: KSÍ
