= 2015 Fylkir season =

Icelandic sports club season

Fylkir
2015 season
- Manager: Ásmundur Arnarsson (until 6 July 2015); Hermann Hreiðarsson (from 6 July 2015)
- Stadium: Fylkisvöllur
- Borgunarbikarinn: Quarter finals
- Lengjubikarinn: Quarter finals
- Top goalscorer: League: Albert Brynjar Ingason (5); All: Albert Brynjar Ingason (13)
Home colours	Away colours

The 2015 season is Fylkir's 19th season in Úrvalsdeild and their 16th consecutive season in top-flight of Icelandic Football.

To start the season, Fylkir was coached by Ásmundur Arnarsson for the fourth consecutive season after he signed a new three-year contract on 9 October 2014. He was assisted by Reynir Leósson.

Along with the Úrvalsdeild, the club also competed in the Lengjubikarinn and Borgunarbikarinn.

On 6 July Ásmundur Arnarsson, following the 4–0 defeat against ÍBV, left the club by mutual consent. He was replaced with Hermann Hreiðarsson.

On 20 July Albert Brynjar Ingason became the club's all-time top scorer in the Úrvalsdeild scoring his 42nd goal in a 1–0 win against Breiðablik.

== First Team ==
As of 30 July 2015. These players competed in Úrvalsdeild, Borgunarbikarinn, Lengjubikarinn

Note: Flags indicate national team as defined under FIFA eligibility rules; some limited exceptions apply. Players may hold more than one non-FIFA nationality.

No.	Pos.	Nation	Player
1	GK	ISL	Bjarni Þórður Halldórsson
2	DF	ISL	Kristján Hauksson
3	MF	ISL	Ásgeir Börkur Ásgeirsson (Captain)
4	DF	CRO	Tonci Radovnikovic
5	DF	ISL	Ásgeir Eyþórsson
6	MF	ISL	Oddur Ingi Guðmundsson
7	MF	ISL	Ingimundur Níels Óskarsson
8	MF	ISL	Jóhannes Karl Guðjónsson
9	FW	ISL	Ragnar Bragi Sveinsson
10	MF	ISL	Andrés Már Jóhannesson
11	DF	ISL	Kjartan Ágúst Breiðdal
12	GK	ISL	Ólafur Íshólm Ólafsson

No.	Pos.	Nation	Player
13	MF	ISL	Kolbeinn Finnsson
14	FW	ISL	Albert Brynjar Ingason
15	FW	ISL	Hákon Ingi Jónsson
16	DF	ISL	Tómas J. Þorsteinsson
17	MF	ISL	Ásgeir Örn Arnþórsson
19	MF	ISL	Reynir Haraldsson
21	DF	ISL	Daði Ólafsson
23	MF	ISL	Andri Þór Jónsson
24	MF	ISL	Elís Rafn Björnsson
27	FW	ISL	Orri Sveinn Stefánsson
28	MF	ISL	Sigurvin Reynisson

== Transfers and loans ==
=== Transfers in ===
Date	Position	No.	Player	From club	Other	Ref
30 October 2014	MF	7	(Iceland) Ingimundur Níels Óskarsson	(Iceland) FH		
30 October 2014	MF	8	(Iceland) Jóhannes Karl Guðjónsson	(Iceland) Fram		
13 November 2014	MF	3	(Iceland) Ásgeir Börkur Ásgeirsson	(Sweden) GAIS		
20 December 2014	DF	19	(Iceland) Reynir Haraldsson	(Iceland) ÍR		
21 April 2015	DF	4	(Croatia) Tonci Radovinkovic	(Croatia) NK Solin		

=== Transfers out ===
Date	Position	No.	Player	To club	Other	Ref
16 November 2014	DF	4	(Iceland) Finnur Ólafsson	(Iceland) Víkingur R		
21 January 2015	MF	13	(Iceland) Magnús Ottó Benediktsson	(Iceland) HK		
27 February 2015	GK	32	(Iceland) Björn Hákon Sveinsson	(Iceland) Völsungur		
27 February 2015	MF	8	(Iceland) Viktor Örn Guðmundsson	(Iceland) Fjarðabyggð		
16 April 2015	MF	7	(Iceland) Gunnar Örn Jónsson	(Iceland) Augnablik		
28 April 2015	DF	5	(Iceland) Davíð Þór Ásbjörnsson	(Iceland) Þróttur R		

=== Loans out ===
Start Date	End Date	Position	No.	Player	To Club	Ref
17 July 2015	16 October 2015	FW	22	(Iceland) Davíð Einarsson	(Iceland) Fram	
30 July 2015	16 October 2015	DF	20	(Iceland) Stefán Ragnar Guðlaugsson	(Iceland) ÍBV	

== Pre-season ==
=== Reykjavík Cup ===
Fylkir took part in the 2015 Reykjavík Cup, a pre-season tournament for clubs from Reykjavík.

The team played in group A along with Fjölnir, KR and Fram. Fylkir finished third in the group behind Fjölnir and KR with 1 point and did not go through to the semi-finals.

Date	Round	Opponents	Stadium	Result F–A	Scorers
16 January 2015	Group stage	KR	Egilshöll	1–2	Albert Brynjar 26'
25 January 2015	Group stage	Fjölnir	Egilshöll	1–2	Albert Brynjar 87'
29 January 2015	Group stage	Fram	Egilshöll	1–1	Stefán Ragnar 30'

== Lengjubikarinn ==
Fylkir were drawn in group 1 in the Icelandic league cup, Lengjubikarinn, along with FH, Breiðablik, ÍBV, Þróttur R, Víkingur Ó, BÍ/Bolungarvík and HK.

Fylkir finished top of the group with 16 points and went through to the quarter-finals.

In the quarter-finals Fylkir were defeated by KA 5–1 with Albert Brynjar scoring Fylkir's only goal.

Date	Round	Opponents	Stadium	Result F–A	Scorers
14 February 2015	Group stage	ÍBV	Egilshöll	4–0	Andrés Már 18' Albert Brynjar 37'(p.) 72' Oddur Ingi 90'
20 February 2015	Group stage	Breiðablik	Egilshöll	0–0	
1 March 2015	Group stage	BÍ/Bolungarvík	Egilshöll	5–0	Andrés Már 7' 49' Albert Brynjar 34' 40' Kjartan Ágúst 77'
5 March 2015	Group stage	Þróttur R	Egilshöll	4–1	Ingimundur Níels 1' 38' Albert Brynjar 8' Ásgeir Örn 56'
12 March 2015	Group stage	HK	Kórinn	3–0	Ásgeir Örn 28' Ingimundur Níels 29' Ragnar Bragi 72'
22 March 2015	Group stage	FH	Egilshöll	1–2	Ásgeir Örn 51'
10 April 2015	Group stage	Víkingur Ó	Fylkisvöllur	2–0	Kristján Hauks. 39' Albert Brynjar 81'(p.)
10 April 2015	Quarter-finals	KA	Framvöllur	1–5	Albert Brynjar 62'

=== Úrvalsdeild ===
==== League table ====
Pos	Team	Pld	W	D	L	GF	GA	GD	Pts	Qualification or relegation
1	FH (C)	22	15	3	4	47	26	+21	48	Qualification for the Champions League second qualifying round
2	Breiðablik	22	13	7	2	34	13	+21	46	Qualification for the Europa League first qualifying round
3	KR	22	12	6	4	36	21	+15	42	Qualification for the Europa League first qualifying round
4	Stjarnan	22	9	6	7	32	24	+8	33	
5	Valur	22	9	6	7	38	31	+7	33	Qualification for the Europa League first qualifying round (Note: Valur qualified for the UEFA Europa League first qualifying round by winning the 2015 Icelandic Cup.)
6	Fjölnir	22	9	6	7	36	35	+1	33	
7	ÍA	22	7	8	7	31	31	0	29	
8	Fylkir	22	7	8	7	26	31	−5	29	
9	Víkingur Reykjavík	22	5	8	9	32	36	−4	23	
10	ÍBV	22	5	4	13	26	37	−11	19	
11	Leiknir Reykjavík (R)	22	3	6	13	20	34	−14	15	Relegation to 1. deild karla
12	Keflavík (R)	22	2	4	16	22	61	−39	10	Relegation to 1. deild karla

Source: KSÍ, Soccerway
Rules for classification: 1) Points; 2) Goal difference; 3) Goals scored; 4) Head-to-head points; 5) Head-to-head goal difference; 6) Head-to-head goals scored; 7) Head-to-head away goals scored; 8) Play-off (only for deciding champion); 9) Draw.
(C) Champions; (R) Relegated

==== Results summary ====
Overall								Home						Away					
Pld	W	D	L	GF	GA	GD	Pts	W	D	L	GF	GA	GD	W	D	L	GF	GA	GD
22	7	8	7	26	31	−5	29	4	3	4	15	19	−4	3	5	3	11	12	−1

Last updated: 3 October 2015.
Source: Results

==== Results by matchday ====
Matchday	1	2	3	4	5	6	7	8	9	10	11	12	13	14	15	16	17	18	19	20	21	22
Ground	H	A	H	H	A	H	A	H	A	H	A	A	H	A	A	H	A	H	A	H	A	H
Result	D	D	W	L	W	L	D	L	D	W	D	W	L	W	L	D	L	D	L	W	D	W
Position	7	8	3	8	6	8	6	7	7	7	7	5	7	6	7	6	7	7	7	7	8	8

Updated to match(es) played on 3 October 2015. Source: Results
A = Away; H = Home; W = Win; D = Draw; L = Loss

=== Matches ===
7 May 2015 1	Fylkir	1–1	Breiðablik	Reykjavík
19:15 GMT	A.B.Ingason 39'; A.Eyþórsson (yellow card) 62'; J.Guðjónsson (yellow card) 69'	Report	G.P.Lýðsson 48' (pen.); A.S.Aðalsteinsson (yellow card) 69'	Stadium: Fylkisvöllur; Attendance: 2,220; Referee: Gunnar Jarl Jónsson

11 May 2015 2	Fjölnir	1–1	Fylkir	Reykjavík
19:15 GMT	E.Pálsson (yellow card) 29'; G.K.Guðmundsson 35'	Report	O.I.Guðmundsson (yellow card) 50'; A.B.Ásgeirsson (yellow card) 71'; K.Hauksson (yellow card) 78'; T.Radovinkovic 90'	Stadium: Fjölnisvöllur; Attendance: 1,114; Referee: Vilhjálmur Alvar Þórarinsson

17 May 2015 3	Fylkir	3–0	ÍBV	Reykjavík
17:00 GMT	O.I.Guðmundsson 78', 80'; T.Radovinkovic 86'	Report		Stadium: Fylkisvöllur; Attendance: 1,050; Referee: Garðar Örn Hinriksson

20 May 2015 4	Fylkir	1–3	KR	Reykjavík
20:00 GMT	D.Ólafsson (yellow card) 9'; A.B.Ingason 22' (yellow card) 81'; A.M.Jóhannesson (yellow card) 73'; E.R.Björnsson (yellow card) 87'	Report	S.Frederiksen 6' (yellow card) 63'; S.J.Friðgeirsson 35'; G.Lorenzo (yellow card) 77'; Þ.M.Ragnarsson 90'	Stadium: Fylkisvöllur; Attendance: 1,290; Referee: Þóroddur Hjaltalín

25 May 2015 5	Keflavík	1–3	Fylkir	Keflavík
19:15 GMT	Kiko Insa (yellow card) 31'; H.Guðmundsson (yellow card) 42'; Arends (yellow card) 58'; M.S.Þorsteinsson 61'	Report	A.B.Ásgeirsson (yellow card) 8'; A.M.Jóhannesson 53'; A.B.Ingason 58' (pen.); T.Radovinkovic (yellow card) 62'; O.I.Guðmundsson 70'	Stadium: Nettóvöllurinn; Attendance: 827; Referee: Ívar Orri Kristjánsson

31 May 2015 6	Fylkir	0–3	Valur	Reykjavík
19:15 GMT	O.I.Guðmundsson (yellow card) 57'	Report	Pedersen 42'; K.I.Halldórsson 52'; S.E.Lárusson 59'	Stadium: Fylkisvöllur; Attendance: 1,250; Referee: Vilhjálmur Alvar Þórarinsson

7 June 2015 7	ÍA	0–0	Fylkir	Akranes
19:15 GMT	A.S.Guðmundsson (yellow card) 5'; I.E.Hlynsson (yellow card) 19'; Þ.Þ.Þórðarson (yellow card) 39'; A.Hafsteinsson (yellow card) 64'; Andelkovic (yellow card) 70'; A.S.Ólafsson (yellow card) 80'	Report	R.B.Sveinsson (yellow card) 45'; A.B.Ásgeirsson (yellow card) 63'	Stadium: Norðurálsvöllurinn; Attendance: 754; Referee: Pétur Guðmundsson

15 June 2015 8	Fylkir	0–2	Stjarnan	Reykjavík
19:15 GMT	A.M.Jóhannesson (yellow card) 34'	Report	J.A.Barðdal (yellow card) 29' (goal) 42'; H.O.Björnsson 60'; Præst (yellow card) 60'	Stadium: Fylkisvöllur; Attendance: 977; Referee: Guðmundur Ársæll Guðmundsson

22 June 2015 9	Leiknir R	1–1	Fylkir	Reykjavík
19:15 GMT	O.H.Kristjánsson (yellow card) 79' (goal) 89'	Report	A.B.Ásgeirsson (yellow card) 67'; A.B.Ingason 74'	Stadium: Leiknisvöllur; Attendance: 770; Referee: Ívar Orri Kristjánsson

26 June 2015 10	Fylkir	1–0	Víkingur R	Reykjavík
19:15 GMT	J.Guðjónsson (yellow card) 14'; O.I.Guðmundsson (yellow card) 72'; H.I.Jónsson (yellow card) 90'; A.O.Arnþórsson 90+1'	Report	Taskovic (yellow card) 92'	Stadium: Fylkisvöllur; Attendance: 812; Referee: Þóroddur Hjaltalín

12 July 2015 11	FH	2–2	Fylkir	Hafnarfjörður
19:15 GMT	B.Böðvarsson 57'; Serwy (yellow card) 60'; Hendrickx (yellow card) 61'; D.Þ.Viðarsson (yellow card) 78'; B.A.Guðmundsson 90+1'	Report	R.B.Sveinsson (yellow card) 45'; A.O.Arnþórsson 47'; J.Guðjónsson (yellow card) 53'; H.I.Jónsson (yellow card) 72'; K.A.Breiðdal 90+2'	Stadium: Kaplakrikavöllur; Attendance: 1,689; Referee: Erlendur Eiríksson

20 July 2015 12	Breiðablik	0–1	Fylkir	Kópavogur
19:15 GMT	D.Muminovic (yellow card) 90'	Report	R.B.Sveinsson (yellow card) 49'; A.B.Ingason (yellow card) 53' (goal) 70'; J.Guðjónsson (yellow card) 73'; H.I.Jónsson (yellow card) 82'; A.M.Jóhannesson (yellow card) 90'	Stadium: Kópavogsvöllur; Attendance: 1,320; Referee: Garðar Örn Hinriksson

26 July 2015 13	Fylkir	0–4	Fjölnir	Reykjavík
19:15 GMT		Report	Þ.Guðjónsson 5', 36'; Chopart 28'; M.Magee (yellow card) 86' (goal) 89'	Stadium: Fylkisvöllur; Attendance: 1,144; Referee: Þóroddur Hjaltalín

5 August 2015 14	ÍBV	0–1	Fylkir	Vestmannaeyjar
18:00 GMT	H.Briem (yellow card) 45+2'; J.Barden (yellow card) 60'; D.Adams (yellow card) 87'	Report	O.I.Guðmundsson (yellow card) 57'; J.Guðjónsson 60' (yellow card) 63'	Stadium: Hásteinsvöllur; Attendance: 603; Referee: Ívar Orri Kristjánsson

10 August 2015 15	KR	2–0	Fylkir	Reykjavík
19:15 GMT	S.L.Magnússon (yellow card) 25'; A.B.Jósepsson (yellow card) 45+1'; T.M.Ragnarsson 79'; P.R.Pálmason 83'	Report	R.B.Sveinsson (yellow card) 25'; H.I.Jónsson (yellow card) 48'; T.Radovinković (yellow card) 56'; Á.B.Ásgeirsson (yellow card) 87'	Stadium: Alvogenvöllurinn; Attendance: 1,501; Referee: Valdimar Pálsson

17 August 2015 16	Fylkir	3–3	Keflavík	Reykjavík
18:00 GMT	O.I.Óskarsson 11'; A.B.Ingason 19', 21'; A.Eyþórsson (yellow card) 62'	Report	H.O.Rúnarsson 6'; Hummervoll 15'; G.Antoníusson (yellow card) 62'; M.Þ.Matthíasson 76' (pen.)	Stadium: Fylkisvöllur; Attendance: 980; Referee: Vilhjálmur Alvar Þórarinsson

24 August 2015 17	Valur	4–2	Fylkir	Reykjavík
18:00 GMT	Pedersen 9', 37' (pen.); K.I.Halldórsson 54' (yellow card) 83'; E.K.Ingvarsson 65'; B.O.Eiríksson (yellow card) 77'	Report	J.Guðjónsson (yellow card) 17'; A.Eyþórsson 55', 77'; R.B.Sveinsson (yellow card) 84'	Stadium: Hlíðarendi; Attendance: 491; Referee: Iwan Griffith

30 August 2015 18	Fylkir	0–0	ÍA	Reykjavík
18:00 GMT	J.Guðjónsson (yellow card) 12'; T.Radovniković (yellow card) 27'	Report	J.V.Ákason (yellow card) 42'; A.M.Guðjónsson (yellow card) 50' (yellow-red card) 69'; H.Pétursson (yellow card) 55'	Stadium: Fylkisvöllur; Attendance: 1,010; Referee: Þóroddur Hjaltalín

14 September 2015 19	Stjarnan	1–0	Fylkir	Garðabær
19:15 GMT	Punyed 31'; Þ.G.Rúnarsson (yellow card) 42'; G.Baldvinsson (yellow card) 42'; J.Hansen (yellow card) 81'	Report	Á.B.Ásgeirsson (yellow card) 42'; A.Eyþórsson (yellow card) 59'; T.J.Þorsteinsson (yellow card) 76'; T.Radovinković (yellow card) 90+7'	Stadium: Samsungvöllur; Attendance: 836; Referee: Ívar Orri Kristjánsson

20 September 2015 20	Fylkir	3–1	Leiknir R	Reykjavík
16:00 GMT	R.B.Sveinsson 21', 29' (pen.) (yellow card) 35'; J.Guðjónsson 27'; I.N.Óskarsson (yellow card) 53'	Report	E.Tómasson (yellow card) 30'; E.Magnússon (yellow card) 63'; B.Hlöðversson (yellow card) 65'; S.Björnsson 90'	Stadium: Fylkisvöllur; Attendance: 798; Referee: Valdimar Pálsson

26 September 2015 21	Vikingur R	0–0	Fylkir	Reykjavík
14:00 GMT	Tasković (yellow card) 56'; A.D.Sverrisson (yellow card) 75'	Report	K.Hauksson (yellow card) 23'; D.Ólafsson (yellow card) 31'; I.N.Óskarsson (yellow card) 34'; A.Eyþórsson (yellow card) 44'; R.B.Sveinsson (yellow card) 56'	Stadium: Víkin; Attendance: 567; Referee: Guðmundur Ársæll Guðmundsson

3 October 2015 22	Fylkir	3–2	FH	Reykjavík
14:00 GMT	A.M.Jóhannesson 12'; I.N.Óskarsson 25'; T.Radovinković 54'; A.B.Ásgeirsson (yellow card) 66'	Report	A.V.Björnsson 23'; K.K.Finnbogason (yellow card) 38'; E.Pálsson 72'	Stadium: Fylkisvöllur; Attendance: 593; Referee: Gunnar Jarl Jónsson

== Borgunarbikarinn ==
Fylkir came into the Icelandic cup, Borgunarbikarinn, in the 32nd-finals and were drawn against Njarðvík. Fylkir won the game 3–2 after being 0–2 down until the 84th minute. The equalising goal and the winning goal both came in stoppage time.

In the 16th-finals the team was drawn against Stjarnan. Fylkir won the game 3–0.

On 4 July Fylkir lost to ÍBV in the quarter-finals. After a tight first half ÍBV found the net on the 34th minute and took a 1–0 lead to the second half were they dominated Fylkir scoring three more goals.

Win Draw Loss Upcoming fixture

3 June 2015 32nd-finals	Fylkir	3–2	Njarðvík	Reykjavík
19:15 GMT	Ásgeir Örn Arnþórsson 84'; Ragnar Bragi Sveinsson 92'; Davíð Einarsson 94' (yellow card) 94'	Report	Bergþór Ingi Smárason 39'; Own goal 69'; Magnús Þór Magnússon (yellow card) 76'	Stadium: Fylkisvöllur; Referee: Valgeir Valgeirsson

18 June 2015 16th-finals	Stjarnan	0–3	Fylkir	Garðabær
19:15 GMT	Veigar Páll Gunnarsson (yellow card) 86'	Report	Tómas Þorsteinsson 26'; Albert Brynjar Ingason 77'; Ragnar Bragi Sveinsson 87'; Ásgeir Eyþórsson (yellow card) 64'; Ásgeir Börkur Ásgeirsson (yellow card) 86'	Stadium: Samsung völlurinn Attendance: 630; Referee: Garðar Örn Hinriksson

4 July 2015 Quarter finals	ÍBV	4–0	Fylkir	Vestmannaeyjar
16:00 GMT	Bjarni Gunnarsson 34' 70'; Ian Jeffs 54'; Aron Bjarnason 60'	Report		Stadium: Hásteinsvöllur; Attendance: 506; Referee: Vilhjálmur Alvar Þórarinsson

== Squad statistics ==
As of match played 3 October 2015

=== Appearances and goals ===
No.	Pos	Nat	Player	Total		Úrvalsdeild		Bikarkeppni karla		Deildabikar	
No.	Pos	Nat	Player	Apps	Goals	Apps	Goals	Apps	Goals	Apps	Goals
1	GK	(Iceland) ISL	Bjarni Þórður Halldórsson	12	0	8	0	1	0	3	0
2	DF	(Iceland) ISL	Kristján Hauksson	14	1	5+2	0	1	0	6	1
3	MF	(Iceland) ISL	Ásgeir Börkur Ásgeirsson	29	0	20	0	3	0	6	0
4	DF	(Croatia) CRO	Tonči Radovinković	24	3	21	3	3	0	0	0
5	DF	(Iceland) ISL	Ásgeir Eyþórsson	30	2	21	2	2	0	7	0
6	MF	(Iceland) ISL	Oddur Ingi Guðmundsson	22	4	12+3	3	2	0	3+2	1
7	FW	(Iceland) ISL	Ingimundur Níels Óskarsson	29	5	13+7	2	1+1	0	7	3
8	MF	(Iceland) ISL	Joey Guðjónsson	24	2	15+1	2	1	0	7	0
9	FW	(Iceland) ISL	Ragnar Bragi Sveinsson	30	5	15+4	2	2+1	2	0+8	1
10	MF	(Iceland) ISL	Andrés Már Jóhannesson	29	5	19+3	2	2+1	0	4	3
11	DF	(Iceland) ISL	Kjartan Ágúst Breiðdal	17	2	1+8	1	1+1	0	4+2	1
12	GK	(Iceland) ISL	Ólafur Íshólm Ólafsson	21	0	14	0	2	0	5	0
13	MF	(Iceland) ISL	Kolbeinn Birgir Finsson	15	0	3+6	0	1+1	0	1+3	0
14	FW	(Iceland) ISL	Albert Brynjar Ingason	31	15	21	7	2	1	8	7
15	FW	(Iceland) ISL	Hákon Ingi Jónsson	24	0	6+7	0	2+1	0	8	0
16	DF	(Iceland) ISL	Tómas Joð Þorsteinsson	21	1	15	0	3	1	2+1	0
17	FW	(Iceland) ISL	Ásgeir Örn Arnþórsson	30	6	9+11	2	2+1	1	4+3	3
19	MF	(Iceland) ISL	Reynir Haraldsson	7	0	0	0	0	0	4+3	0
20	DF	(Iceland) ISL	Stefán Ragnar Guðlaugsson	18	0	8+1	0	0+1	0	8	0
21	MF	(Iceland) ISL	Daði Ólafsson	10	0	6+2	0	0	0	0+2	0
22	FW	(Iceland) ISL	Davíð Einarsson	5	1	2+1	0	1	1	0+1	0
23	DF	(Iceland) ISL	Andri Þór Jónsson	6	0	3+2	0	1	0	0	0
24	MF	(Iceland) ISL	Elís Rafn Björnsson	9	0	4+3	0	1+1	0	0	0
26	DF	(Iceland) ISL	Ari Leifsson	2	0	0+2	0	0	0	0	0
27	FW	(Iceland) ISL	Orri Sveinn Stefánsson	2	0	0	0	0	0	0+2	0
28	MF	(Iceland) ISL	Sigurvin Reynisson	2	0	0	0	0	0	1+1	0
29	MF	(Iceland) ISL	Axel Andri Antonsson	3	0	1+2	0	0	0	0	0
Players who appeared for Fylkir but left during the season:
7	MF	(Iceland) ISL	Gunnar Örn Jónsson	3	0	0	0	0	0	0+3	0

=== Goal scorers ===
Place	Position	Nation	Number	Name	Úrvalsdeild	Bikarkeppni karla	Deildabikar	Total
1	FW	(Iceland)	14	Albert Brynjar Ingason	7	1	7	15
2	MF	(Iceland)	17	Ásgeir Örn Arnþórsson	2	1	3	6
3	FW	(Iceland)	9	Ragnar Bragi Sveinsson	2	2	1	5
3	MF	(Iceland)	10	Andrés Már Jóhannesson	2	0	3	5
3	MF	(Iceland)	7	Ingimundur Níels Óskarsson	2	0	3	5
6	MF	(Iceland)	6	Oddur Ingi Guðmundsson	3	0	1	4
7	DF	(Croatia)	4	Tonci Radovnikovic	3	0	0	3
8	MF	(Iceland)	8	Joey Guðjónsson	2	0	0	2
8	DF	(Iceland)	5	Ásgeir Eyþórsson	2	0	0	2
8	DF	(Iceland)	11	Kjartan Ágúst Breiðdal	1	0	1	2
11	FW	(Iceland)	22	Davíð Einarsson	0	1	0	1
11	DF	(Iceland)	16	Tómas Joð Þorsteinsson	0	1	0	1
11	DF	(Iceland)	2	Kristján Hauksson	0	0	1	1
				TOTALS	26	6	20	52

=== Disciplinary record ===
Number	Nation	Position	Name	Úrvalsdeild		Bikarkeppni karla		Deildabikar		Total	
Number	Nation	Position	Name	Booked	Sent off (straight red)	Booked	Sent off (straight red)	Booked	Sent off (straight red)	Booked	Sent off (straight red)
2	(Iceland)	DF	Kristján Hauksson	2	0	0	0	0	0	2	0
3	(Iceland)	MF	Ásgeir Börkur Ásgeirsson	7	0	1	0	3	0	11	0
4	(Croatia)	DF	Tonci Radovnikovic	4	0	0	0	0	0	4	0
5	(Iceland)	DF	Ásgeir Eyþórsson	4	0	1	0	0	0	5	0
6	(Iceland)	MF	Oddur Ingi Guðmundsson	4	0	0	0	0	0	4	0
7	(Iceland)	MF	Ingimundur Níels Óskarsson	2	0	0	0	1	0	3	0
8	(Iceland)	MF	Joey Guðjónsson	7	0	0	0	3	1	10	1
9	(Iceland)	FW	Ragnar Bragi Sveinsson	7	0	0	0	0	0	7	0
10	(Iceland)	MF	Andrés Már Jóhannesson	3	0	0	0	0	0	3	0
14	(Iceland)	FW	Albert Brynjar Ingason	2	0	0	0	1	0	3	0
15	(Iceland)	FW	Hákon Ingi Jónsson	4	0	0	0	1	0	5	0
16	(Iceland)	DF	Tómas Joð Þorsteinsson	1	0	0	0	0	0	1	0
20	(Iceland)	DF	Stefán Ragnar Guðlaugsson	0	0	0	0	2	1	2	1
21	(Iceland)	MF	Daði Ólafsson	2	0	0	0	0	0	2	0
22	(Iceland)	FW	Davíð Einarsson	0	0	1	0	0	0	1	0
24	(Iceland)	MF	Elís Rafn Björnsson	1	0	0	0	0	0	1	0
			TOTALS	50	0	3	0	11	2	64	2
