= 2016 Fylkir season =

Fylkir
2016 season
- Manager: Hermann Hreiðarsson
- Stadium: Fylkisvöllur
- Úrvalsdeild: 11th-Relegated
- League Cup: Quarterfinal vs KR
- Top goalscorer: League: Albert Brynjar Ingason (1); All: Albert Brynjar Ingason (1)
Home colours	Away colours

The 2016 season is Fylkir's 20th season in Úrvalsdeild and their 16th consecutive season in top-flight of Icelandic Football.

Along with competing in the Úrvalsdeild, the club will also participate in the Bikarkeppni karla and the League Cup.

== Squad ==
As of 22 August 2016

Note: Flags indicate national team as defined under FIFA eligibility rules; some limited exceptions apply. Players may hold more than one non-FIFA nationality.

No.	Pos.	Nation	Player
1	GK	ISL	Ólafur Íshólm Ólafsson
3	DF	ISL	Ásgeir Börkur Ásgeirsson
4	DF	CRO	Tonci Radovnikovic
5	DF	ISL	Ásgeir Eyþórsson
6	MF	ISL	Oddur Ingi Guðmundsson
7	MF	ISL	Arnar Bragi Bergsson
8	FW	ESP	Jose Sito Seoane
9	FW	ISL	Ragnar Bragi Sveinsson
10	FW	ISL	Andrés Már Jóhannesson
11	FW	ISL	Víðir Þorvarðarson
12	GK	SLO	Marko Pridigar
13	DF	ISL	Gylfi Gestsson

No.	Pos.	Nation	Player
14	FW	ISL	Albert Brynjar Ingason
15	FW	ISL	Garðar Jóhannsson
16	DF	ISL	Tómas Joð Þorsteinsson
17	FW	ISL	Ásgeir Örn Arnþórsson
20	FW	ESP	Álvaro Montejo Calleja
22	MF	ISL	Emil Ásmundsson
23	DF	ISL	Andri Þór Jónsson
24	MF	ISL	Elís Rafn Björnsson
25	DF	ISL	Valdimar Þór Ingimundarson
26	DF	ISL	Ari Leifsson
29	MF	ISL	Axel Andri Antonsson
28	DF	FRO	Sonni Nattestad (loan from FH)

=== Out on loan ===
Note: Flags indicate national team as defined under FIFA eligibility rules; some limited exceptions apply. Players may hold more than one non-FIFA nationality.

No.	Pos.	Nation	Player
18	MF	ISL	Styrmir Erlendsson (at ÍR)
19	DF	ISL	Reynir Haraldsson (at HK)

No.	Pos.	Nation	Player
21	MF	ISL	Daði Ólafsson (at ÍR)
27	DF	ISL	Orri Sveinn Stefánsson (at Huginn)

== Transfers ==
=== In ===
Date	Position	Nationality	Name	From	Fee	Ref.
21 October 2015	FW	(Spain)	Jose Sito Seoane	ÍBV Vestmannaeyjar		
22 February 2016	FW	(Iceland)	Garðar Jóhannsson	Stjarnan		
22 February 2016	FW	(Iceland)	Víðir Þorvarðarson	ÍBV Vestmannaeyjar		
22 February 2016	MF	(Iceland)	Styrmir Erlendsson	ÍR		
3 March 2016	MF	(Iceland)	Emil Ásmundsson	Brighton & Hove Albion		
15 May 2016	FW	(Iceland)	Ragnar Már Lárusson	Brighton & Hove Albion		
27 July 2016	GK	(Slovenia)	Marko Pridigar	Ayia Napa		
3 August 2016	MF	(Iceland)	Arnar Bragi Bergsson	GAIS		
6 August	FW	(Spain)	Álvaro Calleja			

=== Out ===
Date	Position	Nationality	Name	To	Fee	Ref.
6 February 2016	MF	(Iceland)	Kolbeinn Finnsson	FC Groningen		
21 February 2016	GK	(Iceland)	Bjarni Þórður Halldórsson	Afturelding		
22 February 2016	MF	(Iceland)	Joey Guðjónsson	HK		
22 February 2016	DF	(Iceland)	Stefán Ragnar Guðlaugsson	Selfoss		
22 February 2016	FW	(Iceland)	Hákon Ingi Jónsson	HK		
	DF	(Iceland)	Kristján Hauksson	Retired		
4 March 2016	DF	(Iceland)	Sigurvin Reynisson	Grótta		
18 March 2016	MF	(Iceland)	Eiríkur Ari Eiríksson	Ægir		
16 May 2016	MF	(Iceland)	Hinrik Atli Smárason	HK		
16 May 2016	FW	(Iceland)	Davíð Einarsson	Hvíti Riddarinn		
16 July 2016	FW	(Iceland)	Ragnar Már Lárusson	Kári		
16 July 2016	FW	(Iceland)	Ingimundur Níels Óskarsson	Fjölnir		

=== Loans in ===
Date from	Position	Nationality	Name	From	Date to	Ref.
5 May 2016	GK	(England)	Lewis Ward	Reading	26 June 2016	
27 July 2016	DF	(Faroe Islands)	Sonni Nattestad	FH	End of Season	

=== Loans out ===
Date from	Position	Nationality	Name	From	Date to	Ref.
22 February 2016	DF	(Iceland)	Reynir Haraldsson	HK	End of Season	
19 March 2016	DF	(Iceland)	Orri Sveinn Stefánsson	Huginn	End of Season	
16 July 2016	MF	(Iceland)	Styrmir Erlendsson	ÍR	End of Season	
1 August 2016	MF	(Iceland)	Daði Ólafsson	ÍR	End of Season	

== Competitions ==
=== Úrvalsdeild ===
==== League table ====
Pos	Team	Pld	W	D	L	GF	GA	GD	Pts	Qualification or relegation
8	ÍA	22	10	1	11	28	33	−5	31	
9	ÍBV	22	6	5	11	23	27	−4	23	
10	Víkingur Ólafsvík	22	5	6	11	23	38	−15	21	
11	Fylkir (R)	22	4	7	11	25	40	−15	19	Relegation to 1. deild karla
12	Þróttur Reykjavík (R)	22	3	5	14	19	50	−31	14	Relegation to 1. deild karla

Source: KSÍ (in Icelandic), Soccerway
Rules for classification: 1) Points; 2) Goal difference; 3) Goals scored; 4) Head-to-head points; 5) Head-to-head goal difference; 6) Head-to-head goals scored; 7) Head-to-head away goals scored; 8) Play-off (only for deciding champion); 9) Draw.
(R) Relegated

==== Results summary ====
Overall								Home						Away					
Pld	W	D	L	GF	GA	GD	Pts	W	D	L	GF	GA	GD	W	D	L	GF	GA	GD
22	4	7	11	25	39	−14	19	2	3	6	14	24	−10	2	4	5	11	15	−4

Last updated: 1 October 2016.
Source: Results

==== Results by matchday ====
Round	1	2	3	4	5	6	7	8	9	10	11	12	13	14	15	16	17	18	19	20	21	22
Ground	A	H	A	H	A	H	A	A	H	A	H	H	A	H	A	H	A	H	H	A	H	A
Result	L	L	L	L	D	D	L	L	W	W	L	L	D	D	W	L	D	W	L	D	D	L
Position	10	11	12	12	12	12	12	12	12	11	11	11	11	11	11	11	11	11	11	11	11	11

Updated to match(es) played on 1 October 2016. Source: Results
A = Away; H = Home; W = Win; D = Draw; L = Loss

==== Results ====
5 May 2016 1	Stjarnan	2 – 0	Fylkir	Garðabær
19:15 GMT (UTC)	B.Gudjónsson (yellow card) 74'; V.P.Gunnarsson 78', 86'	Summary	A.Eyþórsson (yellow card) 61' (yellow-red card) 77'	Stadium: Samsungvöllur; Attendance: 1,470; Referee: Valdimar Pálsson

8 May 2016 2	Fylkir	1 – 2	Breiðablik	Reykjavík
19:15 GMT (UTC)	T.Radovniković (yellow card) 21'; A.B.Ingason 29'	Summary	A.A.Atlason 12'; Sigurjónsson 81'; D.Muminović (yellow card) 83'	Stadium: Fylkisvöllur; Attendance: 1,522; Referee: Vilhjamur Alvar Thórarinsson

12 May 2016 3	Valur	2 – 0	Fylkir	Reykjavík
19:15 GMT (UTC)	G.Lýdsson 13'; H.P.Sigurðsson 54'	Summary	T.J.Þorsteinsson (yellow card) 73'	Stadium: Hlíðarendi; Attendance: 908; Referee: Thoroddur Hjaltalin

16 May 2016 4	Fylkir	0 – 3	ÍBV Vestmannaeyjar	Reykjavík
17:00 GMT (UTC)	R.B.Sveinsson (yellow card) 50'; A.B.Ingason (yellow card) 76'; D.Ólafsson (yellow card) 76'	Summary	Maigaard 3'; S.S.Magnússon 8'; S.G.Benónýsson 85'	Stadium: Fylkisvöllur; Attendance: 958; Referee: Petur Gudmundsson

21 May 2016 5	ÍA	1 – 1	Fylkir	Akranes
16:00 GMT (UTC)	Gunnlaugsson 36'	Summary	A.B.Ingason 28'; O.I.Guðmundsson (yellow card) 90+2'	Stadium: Akranesvöllur; Attendance: 832; Referee: Vihjalmur Thórarinsson

30 May 2016 6	Fylkir	2 – 2	Fjölnir	Reykjavík
19:15 GMT (UTC)	A.I.Ingason 52'; A.M.Jóhannesson (yellow card) 52'; R.B.Sveinsson (yellow card) 55'; G.Jóhannsson 61'	Summary	M.Pedersen 5'; Salquist 90+3'	Stadium: Fylkisvöllur; Attendance: 1,289; Referee: Ivar Orri Kristjánsson

5 June 2016 7	Víkingur Ólafsvík	1 – 0	Fylkir	Ólafsvík
17:00 GMT (UTC)	Þ.M.Ragnarsson (yellow card) 88'; B.Pálsson 90+3'	Summary	R.B.Sveinsson (yellow card) 10'; E.R.Björnsson (yellow card) 48'	Stadium: Ólafsvíkurvöllur; Attendance: 625; Referee: Petur Gudmundsson

24 June 2016 8	FH	1 – 0	Fylkir	Hafnarfjörður
19:15 GMT (UTC)	Lennon 51'; Doumbia (yellow card) 72'; B.Ólafsson (yellow card) 81'	Summary	A.O.Arnþórsson (yellow card) 35'; E.R.Björnsson (yellow card) 78'	Stadium: Kaplakriki; Attendance: 587; Referee: Valdimar Pálsson

28 June 2016 9	Fylkir	1 – 0	Vikingur Reykjavik	Reykjavík
19:15 GMT (UTC)	T.Radovnikovic (yellow card) 26'; R.B.Sveinsson (yellow card) 58'; O.I.Guðmundsson (yellow card) 61'; J.Seoane 81'	Summary	D.Snorrason (yellow card) 44'	Stadium: Fylkisvöllur; Attendance: 690; Referee: Petur Gudmundsson

11 July 2016 10	Þróttur	1 – 4	Fylkir	Reykjavík
20:00 GMT (UTC)	Thiago 38'	Summary	V.Þorvarðarson 16', 72'; A.M.Jóhannesson (yellow card) 19' (goal) 51'; V.T.Ingimundarson 65'	Stadium: Valbjarnarvöllur; Referee: Helgi Mikael Jónasson

17 July 2016 11	Fylkir	1 – 4	KR	Reykjavík
19:15 GMT (UTC)	T.Radovnikovic 15'; A.B.Ingason (yellow card) 72'; R.B.Sveinsson (yellow card) 85'	Summary	Andersen 2'; A.B.Josepsson 10'; Hauksson 42', 53'; A.Þórðarson (yellow card) 89'	Stadium: Fylkisvöllur; Attendance: 1,642; Referee: Thoroddur Hjaltalin

24 July 2016 12	Fylkir	1 – 2	Stjarnan	Reykjavík
20:00 GMT (UTC)	A.M.Jóhannesson 62'; E.R.Björnsson (yellow card) 78'	Summary	H.A.Halldórsson 88', 90+6'; Laxdal (yellow card) 89'; G.O.Sigurjónsson (yellow card) 90+7'	Stadium: Fylkisvöllur; Attendance: 1,475; Referee: Valdimir Pálsson

3 August 2016 13	Breiðablik	1 – 1	Fylkir	Kópavogur
19:15 GMT (UTC)	O.Sigurjónsson (yellow card) 30'; D.Muminović (yellow card) 53' (goal) 54'	Summary	T.J.Þorsteinsson (yellow card) 49'; E.Ásmundsson 57' (yellow card) 71'	Stadium: Kópavogsvöllur; Attendance: 1,065; Referee: Erlendur Eiriksson

7 August 2016 14	Fylkir	2 – 2	Valur	Reykjavík
19:15 GMT (UTC)	Nattestad (yellow card) 33'; A.M.Jóhannesson (yellow card) 42'; A.B.Ingason 50'; T.Radovinković (yellow card) 78'; G.Jóhannsson 81'	Summary	K.I.Halldórsson 35'; K.F.Sigurðsson 69'	Stadium: Fylkisvöllur; Attendance: 753; Referee: Thoroddur Hjaltalin

18 August 2016 15	ÍBV	1 – 2	Fylkir	Vestmannaeyjar
18:00 GMT (UTC)	E.I.Vignisson 57'; S.Andreasen (yellow card) 61'; Siers (yellow card) 83'; J.Ingason (yellow card) 90+4'	Summary	A.B.Ingason 15', 79'; Nattestad (yellow card) 34'; V.Þorvarðarson (yellow card) 63'	Stadium: Hásteinsvöllur; Attendance: 517; Referee: Gudmundur Gudmundsson

22 August 2016 16	Fylkir	0 – 3	ÍA	Reykjavík
18:00 GMT (UTC)	R.B.Sveinsson (yellow card) 26'; Nattestad (yellow card) 77'; A.B.Ásgeirsson (yellow card) 88'	Summary	A.Hafsteinsson 10'; D.Lough 27'; Gunnlaugsson 57'; H.Flosason (yellow card) 90+2'	Stadium: Fylkisvöllur; Referee: Vilhjálmur Alvar Thórarinsson

28 August 2016 17	Fjölnir	1 – 1	Fylkir	Grafarvogur
18:00 GMT (UTC)	Anton Freyr Ársaelsson 90+5'	Summary	Tonči Radovinković (yellow card) 44'; Álvaro Montejo Calleja 55'; Ragnar Bragi Sveinsson (yellow card) 59'; Andri Þór Jónsson (yellow card) 70'; Jose Sito Seoane Vergara (yellow card) 77'; Ásgeirsson (yellow card) 90'	Stadium: Fjölnisvöllur; Attendance: 880; Referee: (Iceland) Erlendur Eiriksson

11 September 2016 18	Fylkir	2 – 1	Víkingur Ólafsvík	Reykjavík
18:00 GMT (UTC)	Jose Sito Seoane Vergara 8'; Andri Þór Jónsson (yellow card) 14'; Ásgeirsson (yellow card) 29'; Arnar Bragi Bergsson 64' (pen.); Álvaro Montejo Calleja (yellow card) 65'	Summary	Kramar (yellow card) 24'; Alfreð Már Hjaltalín (yellow card) 41'; Emir Dokara (yellow card) 55' (yellow-red card); Alexis Egea Acame (yellow card) 62'; Papa Mamadou Faye 83'; Þorsteinn Már Ragnarsson (yellow card) 90+3'	Stadium: Fylkisvöllur; Attendance: 942; Referee: (Iceland) Petur Gudmundsson

15 September 2016 19	Fylkir	2 – 3	FH	Reykjavík
18:00 GMT (UTC)	Ragnar Bragi Sveinsson 18'; Albert Brynjar Ingason 45+1'; Jóhannsson (yellow card) 88'; Ásgeirsson (red card) 90+2'	Summary	Doumbia 22'; Viðarsson (yellow card) 45+1' (goal) 74'; Bartalsstovu (yellow card) 48'; Kristján Flóki Finnbogason 59'	Stadium: Fylkisvöllur; Attendance: 608; Referee: (Iceland) Ívar Orri Kristjánsson

18 September 2016 20	Vikingur Reykjavik FC	2 – 2	Fylkir	Reykjavík
17:00 GMT (UTC)	Tufegdžić 8'; Tasković (yellow card) 77'; Fuček 83'	Summary	Jóhannsson 22'; Tonči Radovinković (yellow card) 41'; Emil Ásmundsson (yellow card) 43'; Oddur Ingi Guðmundsson 72'; Nattestad (yellow card) 86'	Stadium: Víkin; Attendance: 788; Referee: (Iceland) Erlendur Eiriksson

25 September 2016 21	Fylkir	2 – 2	Þróttur	Reykjavík
15:00 GMT (UTC)	Jóhannsson 19'; Ragnar Bragi Sveinsson 21'; Arnar Bragi Bergsson (yellow card) 66'	Summary	Karl Brynjar Björnsson 13' (yellow card) 81'; Gudmundur Fridriksson 60'; Rafn Andri Haraldsson (yellow card) 84'	Stadium: Fylkisvöllur; Attendance: 958; Referee: (Iceland) Vilhjálmur Alvar Thórarinsson

1 October 2016 22	KR	3 – 0	Fylkir	Reykjavík
15:00 GMT (UTC)	Denis Fazlagic 6'; Morten Beck 42'; Hauksson 80'	Summary	Andri Þór Jónsson (yellow card) 76'; Ásgeirsson (yellow card) 89'	Stadium: KR-völlur; Attendance: 1,555; Referee: (Iceland) Gunnar Jónsson

=== Bikarkeppni karla ===
25 May 2016 Third Round	Keflavík	1 – 2	Fylkir	Keflavík
19:15 GMT (UTC)	H.Guðmundsson (yellow card) 7' (yellow-red card) 90+5'; E.Einarsson (yellow card) 82'; M.Þorsteinsson 90+2' (pen.)	Summary	R.B.Sveinsson 37'; V.Þorvarðarson 41'; A.O.Arnþórsson (yellow card) 73'	Stadium: Keflavíkurvöllur; Referee: Gunnar Gunnarsson

8 June 2016 Fourth Round	Grindavíkur	0 – 2	Fylkir	Keflavík
19:15 GMT (UTC)	M.V.Stefánsson (yellow card) 40'; M.O.Fridriksson (yellow card) 76'	Summary	Þorvarðarson 5'; J. Seoane 31'; E. Ásmundsson (yellow card) 45'	Stadium: Keflavíkurvöllur; Referee: Gunnar Jarl Jónsson

3 July 2016 Quarterfinal	Valur	5 – 0	Fylkir	Reykjavík
16:00 GMT (UTC)	Toft 4'; Hansen 20', 38'; B.Sturluson (yellow card) 40'; K.F.Sigurðsson 71', 74'; Christiansen (yellow card) 86'	Summary	R.B.Sveinsson (yellow card) 10'; E.Ásmundsson (yellow card) 48'	Stadium: Hlíðarendi; Referee: Ivar Orri Kristjánsson

=== Deildabikar ===
==== Group stage ====
Pos	Team	Pld	W	D	L	GF	GA	GD	Pts	Qualification
1	Fylkir (Q)	5	4	1	0	16	7	+9	13	Qualification to the Quarter-finals
2	Breiðablik (Q)	5	3	1	1	8	7	+1	10	Qualification to the Quarter-finals
3	Víkingur Ólafsvík	5	2	3	0	10	6	+4	9	
4	KA	5	2	1	2	13	7	+6	7	
5	UMF Selfoss	5	1	0	4	7	9	−2	3	
6	Fjarðabyggðar	5	0	0	5	2	21	−19	0	

Updated to match(es) played on 4 April 2016. Source: Group 2
Rules for classification: 1) points; 2) goal difference; 3) number of goals scored.
(Q) Qualified for the phase indicated

13 February 2016 1	Breiðablik	1 – 3	Fylkir	Kópavogur
11:15 GMT (UTC)	A.A.Atlason 21' (yellow card) 50'; D.Muminovic (yellow card) 36'; V.O.Margeirsson (yellow card) 36'; Helgason (yellow card) 67'	Summary	R.B.Sveinsson 16'; Jóhannesson 31' (yellow card) 42'; S.Erlendsson (yellow card) 62'; J.Seoane 78'	Stadium: Kópavogsvöllur; Referee: Guðmundur Ársæll Guðmundsson

20 February 2016 2	Fylkir	2 – 2	Víkingur Ólafsvík	Reykjavík
17:15 GMT (UTC)	J.Seoane 43'; R.B.Sveinsson 86'; Jóhannsson (yellow card) 90+3'	Summary	K.Turudija (yellow card) 29'; Tokić 32' (pen.); A.M.Hjaltalín 53'; V.S.Stefánsson (yellow card) 90+1'	Stadium: Fylkisvöllur; Referee: Helgi Mikael Jónasson

3 March 2016 3	Fylkir	4 – 1	Selfoss	Reykjavík
21:00 GMT (UTC)	R.B.Sveinsson 36', 48' (pen.); V.Þorvarðarson (yellow card) 64'; Á.B.Ásgeirsson (yellow card) 64'; Ó.Í.Ólafsson (yellow card) 65'; S.Erlendsson (yellow card) 85'; I.N.Óskarsson 83', 87'	Summary	S.R.Guðlaugsson (yellow card) 48'; A.G.Ragnarsson (yellow card) 70' (yellow-red card) 79'; G.Pantano (yellow card) 77'	Stadium: Fylkisvöllur; Referee: Gunnar Sverrir Gunnarsson

19 March 2016 4	Fjarðabyggðar	1 – 3	Fylkir	Reyðarfjörður
13:00 GMT (UTC)	C.Puscas (yellow card) 46'; V.P.Einarsson (yellow card) 74'; V.Pálmason 90+2' (pen.)	Summary	J.Seoane 20'; T.Þorsteinsson 32'; R.B.Sveinsson (yellow card) 74'; D.Ólafsson 84'	Stadium: Fjarðabyggðarhöllin; Referee: Tómas Orri Hreinsson

4 April 2016 5	Fylkir	4 – 2	Knattspyrnufélag Akureyrar	Reykjavík
19:00 GMT (UTC)	O.I.Guðmundsson 23'; J.Seoane 26'; Jóhannsson 32', 53'	Summary	H.M.Steingrímsson 12', 56'; Á.Sigurgeirsson (yellow card) 84'	Stadium: Valsvöllur; Attendance: 110; Referee: Gunnar Jarl Jónsson

==== Knockout stage ====
8 April 2016 Quarterfinal	Fylkir	0 – 3	KR	Reykjavík
18:00 GMT (UTC)	J.Seoane (yellow card) 32'; E.Ásmundsson (yellow card) 45+1'; T.Þorsteinsson (yellow card) 90+2'	KSI Report	Andersen 50', 66'; Hauksson 56'	Stadium: Vodafonevöllurinn; Referee: Gudmundur Gudmundsson Ársæll

== Squad statistics ==
As of match played 22 August 2016

=== Appearances and goals ===
No.	Pos	Nat	Player	Total		Úrvalsdeild		Bikarkeppni karla		Deildabikar	
No.	Pos	Nat	Player	Apps	Goals	Apps	Goals	Apps	Goals	Apps	Goals
1	GK	(Iceland) ISL	Ólafur Íshólm Ólafsson	22	0	13	0	3	0	6	0
3	MF	(Iceland) ISL	Ásgeir Börkur Ásgeirsson	12	0	4+2	0	0	0	6	0
4	DF	(Croatia) CRO	Tonči Radovinković	22	1	16	1	3	0	3	0
5	DF	(Iceland) ISL	Ásgeir Eyþórsson	20	0	11	0	3	0	6	0
6	MF	(Iceland) ISL	Oddur Ingi Guðmundsson	16	1	10	0	2+1	0	2+1	1
7	MF	(Iceland) ISL	Arnar Bragi Bergsson	2	0	1+1	0	0	0	0	0
8	FW	(Spain) ESP	Jose Sito Seoane	23	6	7+7	1	3	1	6	4
9	FW	(Iceland) ISL	Ragnar Bragi Sveinsson	19	5	11+1	0	3	1	4	4
10	MF	(Iceland) ISL	Andrés Már Jóhannesson	22	3	16	2	1	0	5	1
11	FW	(Iceland) ISL	Víðir Þorvarðarson	20	4	7+4	2	2+1	2	5+1	0
14	FW	(Iceland) ISL	Albert Brynjar Ingason	18	6	15+1	6	0+1	0	0+1	0
15	FW	(Iceland) ISL	Garðar Jóhannsson	20	4	10+4	2	1	0	2+3	2
16	DF	(Iceland) ISL	Tómas Joð Þorsteinsson	23	1	13+1	0	3	0	5+1	1
17	FW	(Iceland) ISL	Ásgeir Örn Arnþórsson	20	0	7+4	0	2+1	0	4+2	0
18	FW	(Iceland) ISL	Styrmir Erlendsson	7	0	1+1	0	0	0	1+4	0
20	DF	(Spain) ESP	Álvaro Calleja	3	0	0+3	0	0	0	0	0
21	MF	(Iceland) ISL	Daði Ólafsson	4	1	1+1	0	0	0	1+1	1
22	MF	(Iceland) ISL	Emil Ásmundsson	19	1	9+3	1	2+1	0	2+2	0
23	DF	(Iceland) ISL	Andri Þór Jónsson	17	0	9+2	0	1+1	0	4	0
24	MF	(Iceland) ISL	Elís Rafn Björnsson	11	0	5+3	0	3	0	0	0
25	MF	(Iceland) ISL	Valdimar Þór Ingimundarson	4	1	1+2	1	0+1	0	0	0
26	DF	(Iceland) ISL	Ari Leifsson	2	0	0	0	0+1	0	0+1	0
27	DF	(Iceland) ISL	Orri Sveinn Stefánsson	1	0	0	0	0	0	1	0
28	DF	(Faroe Islands) FRO	Sonni Nattestad	4	0	4	0	0	0	0	0
29	MF	(Iceland) ISL	Axel Andri Antonsson	7	0	0+4	0	0	0	0+3	0
Players who appeared for Fylkir but left during the season:
7	FW	(Iceland) ISL	Ingimundur Níels Óskarsson	11	2	2+2	0	1+1	0	3+2	2
12	GK	(England) ENG	Lewis Ward	3	0	3	0	0	0	0	0

=== Goal scorers ===
Place	Position	Nation	Number	Name	Úrvalsdeild	Bikarkeppni karla	Deildabikar	Total
1	FW	(Iceland)	14	Albert Brynjar Ingason	6	0	0	6
1	FW	(Spain)	8	Jose Sito Seoane	1	1	4	6
2	FW	(Iceland)	9	Ragnar Bragi Sveinsson	0	1	4	5
3	FW	(Iceland)	11	Víðir Þorvarðarson	2	2	0	4
5	FW	(Iceland)	15	Garðar Jóhannsson	2	0	2	4
6	MF	(Iceland)	10	Andrés Már Jóhannesson	2	0	1	3
7	FW	(Iceland)	7	Ingimundur Níels Óskarsson	0	0	2	2
8	MF	(Iceland)	25	Valdimar Þór Ingimundarson	1	0	0	1
8	DF	(Croatia)	4	Tonči Radovinković	1	0	0	1
8	MF	(Iceland)	22	Emil Ásmundsson	1	0	0	1
8	DF	(Iceland)	16	Tómas Joð Þorsteinsson	0	0	1	1
8	MF	(Iceland)	21	Daði Ólafsson	0	0	1	1
8	MF	(Iceland)	6	Oddur Ingi Guðmundsson	0	0	1	1
				TOTALS	16	4	16	36

=== Disciplinary record ===
Number	Nation	Position	Name	Úrvalsdeild		Bikarkeppni karla		Deildabikar		Total	
Number	Nation	Position	Name	Yellow card	Red card	Yellow card	Red card	Yellow card	Red card	Yellow card	Red card
1	(Iceland)	GK	Ólafur Íshólm Ólafsson	0	0	0	0	1	0	1	0
3	(Iceland)	DF	Ásgeir Börkur Ásgeirsson	1	0	0	0	1	0	1	0
4	(Croatia)	DF	Tonci Radovnikovic	3	0	0	0	0	0	3	0
5	(Iceland)	DF	Ásgeir Eyþórsson	2	1	0	0	0	0	2	1
6	(Iceland)	MF	Oddur Ingi Guðmundsson	2	0	0	0	0	0	2	0
8	(Spain)	FW	Jose Sito Seoane	0	0	0	0	1	0	1	0
9	(Iceland)	FW	Ragnar Bragi Sveinsson	6	0	1	0	1	0	7	0
10	(Iceland)	FW	Andrés Már Jóhannesson	3	0	0	0	1	0	4	0
11	(Iceland)	FW	Víðir Þorvarðarson	1	0	0	0	1	0	2	0
14	(Iceland)	FW	Albert Brynjar Ingason	2	0	0	0	0	0	2	0
15	(Iceland)	FW	Garðar Jóhannsson	0	0	0	0	1	0	1	0
16	(Iceland)	DF	Tómas Joð Þorsteinsson	2	0	0	0	1	0	3	0
17	(Iceland)	FW	Ásgeir Örn Arnþórsson	1	0	1	0	0	0	2	0
18	(Iceland)	MF	Styrmir Erlendsson	0	0	0	0	2	0	2	0
21	(Iceland)	MF	Daði Ólafsson	1	0	0	0	0	0	1	0
22	(Iceland)	DF	Emil Ásmundsson	1	0	2	0	1	0	4	0
24	(Iceland)	MF	Elís Rafn Björnsson	3	0	0	0	0	0	3	0
28	(Faroe Islands)	DF	Sonni Nattestad	3	0	0	0	0	0	2	0
			TOTALS	28	1	4	0	11	0	43	1
