= Viðarsson =

Viðarsson is an Icelandic surname. Notable people with the surname include:

- Arnar Viðarsson (born 1978), Icelandic footballer, Brother of Bjarni and Davíð
- Bjarni Viðarsson (born 1988), Icelandic footballer, Brother of Arnar and Davíð
- Davíð Viðarsson (born 1984), Icelandic footballer, Brothher of Arnar and Bjarni
- Elliði Snær Viðarsson (born 1998), Icelandic handballer
