= Francesco D'Onofrio =

Francesco D'Onofrio may refer to:

- François D'Onofrio (born 1990), Belgian football player
- Francesco D'Onofrio (politician) (born 1939), Italian politician and academic
