= Sverrir Sverrisson =

Icelandic footballer

Personal information
- Date of birth: 31 December 1969 (age 56)
- Place of birth: Sauðárkrókur, Iceland
- Position: Midfielder

Senior career*
Years	Team	Apps	(Gls)
1985–1990	Tindastóll	?	(?)
1991	KA	18	(4)
1992–1993	Tindastóll	17+	(7+)
1994–1996	Leiftur	49	(19)
1997	ÍBV	18	(7)
1998–1999	Malmö FF	31	(7)
2000–2003	Fylkir	67	(17)
2004	Breiðablik	17	(0)

International career
1985	Iceland U-17	2	(0)
1996–2001	Iceland	17	(0)

Managerial career
- 2005: Fylkir (caretaker)
- 2008: Fylkir (caretaker)
- * Club domestic league appearances and goals

Sverrir Sverrisson (born 31 December 1969) is an Icelandic former footballer who played as a midfielder. His brother is former captain and later manager of the Icelandic national football team, Eyjólfur Sverrisson.
