= Viðar Halldórsson =

Icelandic footballer (born 1953)

Personal information
- Date of birth: May 23, 1953 (age 73)
- Place of birth: Hafnarfjörður, Iceland
- Position: Defender

Youth career
- FH

Senior career*
Years	Team	Apps	(Gls)
1970–1987	FH		

International career
1976–1983	Iceland	27	(0)
- * Club domestic league appearances and goals

Viðar Halldórsson (born 23 May 1953) is an Icelandic former footballer who played as a defender for FH and the Iceland national team. After his retirement, he returned to his home club in an administrative role, currently serving as chairman.

== Playing career ==
=== Club career ===
Viðar spent his entire career with his hometown club FH, making his first-team debut in 1970 and playing in over 400 matches. He helped them achieve promotion to the Úrvalsdeild karla three different times, including two first-place finishes in the second-tier 1. deild karla in 1974 and 1984.

Apart from football, he played handball at the youth level for FH and a stint at the senior level for Stjarnan.

=== International career ===
Viðar earned 27 caps with the Iceland national team, making his senior international debut on 16 June 1976 in a friendly against Faroe Islands, although it is not officially recognized since their opponent was not a FIFA member at the time. Two months later he replaced Ólafur Sigurvinsson during a 3–1 win over Luxembourg that marked his first FIFA-sanctioned international appearance.

He went on to represent his country in the 1978 and 1982 FIFA World Cup qualification campaigns as well as UEFA Euro 1984 qualifying, wearing the captain armband on six occasions. His last appearance came in a 3–0 defeat to Ireland in 1983.

== Business and administrative career ==
During his playing career, Viðar studied business and accounting at the University of Iceland. He entered the shipping and real estate industries, holding executive positions at multiple companies.

He returned to FH in 1990 as vice-chairman of the football department, and in 2008 was elected chairman of the club as a whole. He also presides on the board of the European Club Association.

== Personal life ==
He married Guðrún Bjarney Bjarnadóttir in 1976; all three of their sons (Arnar, Davíð and Bjarni) became professional footballers who went on to represent Iceland internationally.

== Career statistics ==
=== International ===
Appearances and goals by national team and year
National team	Year	Apps	Goals
Iceland	1976	2	0
Iceland	1977	2	0
Iceland	1978	0	0
Iceland	1979	1	0
Iceland	1980	3	0
Iceland	1981	5	0
Iceland	1982	8	0
Iceland	1983	6	0
Total		27	0

== Honours ==
=== Club ===
FH

- 1. deild karla: 1974, 1984

== See also ==
- List of one-club men in association football
