= Þórarinn Ingi Valdimarsson =

Icelandic footballer

Personal information
- Full name: Þórarinn Ingi Valdimarsson
- Date of birth: 23 April 1990 (age 36)
- Place of birth: Vestmannaeyjar, Iceland
- Height: 1.75 m (5 ft 9 in)
- Positions: Defender; midfielder

Youth career
- 2002–2007: ÍBV

Senior career*
Years	Team	Apps	(Gls)
2007–2014	ÍBV	117	(18)
2013–2014	→ Sarpsborg 08 (loan)	39	(2)
2015–2018	FH	56	(4)
2018–2024	Stjarnan	83	(1)

International career
2007	Iceland U17	3	(0)
2008	Iceland U19	5	(0)
2010–2012	Iceland U21	7	(0)
2011	Iceland futsal team	3	(4)
2012–2016	Iceland	4	(0)
- * Club domestic league appearances and goals

Þórarinn Ingi Valdimarsson (anglicized Thorarinn Ingi Valdimarsson; born 23 April 1990) is a retired Icelandic footballer.

== Club career ==
Þórarinn was born and raised in the town of Vestmannaeyjar, and had his debut for Íþróttabandalag Vestmannaeyja (ÍBV) in 2007 and played 12 games for the team in the 1. deild karla (men's 1st division).

Þórarinn scored 2 goals in 19 games when ÍBV won promotion to the Úrvalsdeild (Premier division) after winning the 2008 1. deild karla, and was named as the most promising player of the squad at the end of the season. The same year he played 5 games for the Iceland U19 national team. Þórarinn was on a one-month trial with Belgian team KV Mechelen in January 2009.

Þórarinn scored 1 goal in 19 matches in 2009 when ÍBV were again playing in the Icelandic top league, after five years of absence. The next season, he scored 5 goals in 21 matches when ÍBV finished third in the 2010 Úrvalsdeild. On 5 December 2010 he signed a new three-year contract with ÍBV. He was later selected for Iceland's first Futsal team.

Þórarinn started 21 matches and scored 5 goals in 2011, when ÍBV again finished third in the league. He also played four matches in the Icelandic Cup, scoring one goal. At the end of the season he was elected "young player of the year" by the players in Úrvalsdeild, joining famous players such as Guðni Bergsson, Rúnar Kristinsson and Eiður Guðjohnsen. The same year, Þórarinn played three matches for the under-21 team and was called up for the senior team at the end of the year, in a squad consisting of players from the Scandinavian leagues. In November 2011 he was on trials with English clubs Crewe Alexandra and Portsmouth.

He was in January 2012 offered a trial with Danish Superliga side Silkeborg IF. Þórarinn made his debut for the Icelandic national team when he started the friendly match against Japan in February 2012.

== Honours ==
=== Team ===
FH

- Besta deild: 2015, 2016

Stjarnan

- Icelandic Cup: 2018

=== Individual ===
ÍBV

- Besta deild karla - Young Player of the Year: 2011
