= Garðar Jóhannsson =

Icelandic footballer

Personal information
- Date of birth: 1 April 1980 (age 46)
- Place of birth: Garðabær, Iceland
- Height: 1.90 m (6 ft 3 in)
- Position: Forward

Senior career*
Years	Team	Apps	(Gls)
1999–2002	Stjarnan	50	(28)
2003–2006	KR Reykjavík	38	(4)
2006	Valur	6	(4)
2006–2009	Fredrikstad	58	(18)
2010	Hansa Rostock	14	(3)
2010	Strømsgodset	6	(1)
2011–2015	Stjarnan	76	(29)
2016	Fylkir	19	(4)
2017	KR Reykjavík	13	(0)
2018	KFG Garðabær	5	(0)

International career
2008–2012	Iceland	8	(2)
- * Club domestic league appearances and goals

Garðar Jóhannsson (born 1 April 1980) is an Icelandic former professional footballer who played as a forward.

== Career ==
Garðar was born in Garðabær. Fredrikstad bought him for 2 million NOK in August 2006, only a month after he was bought for 100.000 NOK by an Icelandic club. Because Garðar had played for KR Reykjavík and Valur after 1 July 2006, he had to wait almost one year before he could play matches for Fredrikstad.

Garðar made his debut in Tippeligaen against Vålerenga on 26 May 2007, where he scored the only goal of the match. He scored 18 goals in 58 matches for Fredrikstad. On 22 January 2010, he joined 2. Bundesliga club Hansa Rostock.

Garðar later played for Strømsgodset, where he played six matches and scored one goal in the 2010 season.
