= Ásgeir Börkur Ásgeirsson =

Icelandic footballer

Personal information
- Full name: Ásgeir Börkur Ásgeirsson
- Date of birth: 16 April 1987 (age 39)
- Place of birth: Reykjavík, Iceland
- Height: 1.77 m (5 ft 10 in)
- Position: Midfielder

Team information
- Current team: ÍR

Youth career
- 1995–2006: Fylkir

Senior career*
Years	Team	Apps	(Gls)
2007–2013	Fylkir	88	(1)
2007	→ UMF Selfoss (loan)	14	(5)
2008	→ UMF Selfoss (loan)	10	(1)
2013	→ Sarpsborg (loan)	8	(0)
2014	GAIS	16	(0)
2015–2018	Fylkir	71	(0)
2019–2021	HK	57	(1)
2022	Fylkir	12	(0)
2023	ÍR	21	(0)
- * Club domestic league appearances and goals as of 18 September 2023

Ásgeir Börkur Ásgeirsson (born 16 April 1987) is an Icelandic former footballer who played as a midfielder for ÍR, whom he joined from Fylkir.

== Club career ==
Ásgeirsson was born in Reykjavík, and played for Fylkir's youth teams, before joining lower leagues team UMF Selfoss on loan for two consecutive years in 2007 and 2008. He made his debut for Fylkir in 2008, before going on to make 79 league appearances for the team. During his senior career in Iceland, Ásgeirsson was sent off 4 times and shown 52 yellow cards.

In April 2013, Ásgeirsson signed for Norwegian club Sarpsborg 08 FF on loan for 3 months.

On 18 September 2023, Ásgeir announced his retirement from football.

== Career statistics ==
=== Club ===
As of match played 27 September 2017.

Appearances and goals by club, season and competition
Club	Season	League			National Cup		League Cup		Continental		Other		Total	
Club	Season	Division	Apps	Goals	Apps	Goals	Apps	Goals	Apps	Goals	Apps	Goals	Apps	Goals
Fylkir	2007	Úrvalsdeild	0	0	0	0	2	0	-		-		2	0
Fylkir	2008	Úrvalsdeild	4	0	1	1	3	0	-		-		8	1
Fylkir	2009	Úrvalsdeild	20	0	3	0	7	0	-		-		30	0
Fylkir	2010	Úrvalsdeild	18	1	2	0	7	0	2	0	-		29	1
Fylkir	2011	Úrvalsdeild	18	0	1	0	8	0	-		-		27	0
Fylkir	2012	Úrvalsdeild	19	0	2	0	7	0	-		-		28	0
Fylkir	2013	Úrvalsdeild	9	0	0	0	5	0	-		-		14	0
Fylkir	Fylkir Total		88	1	9	1	39	0	2	0	0	0	138	2
UMF Selfoss (loan)	2007	2. deild karla	14	5	1	0	0	0	-		-		15	5
UMF Selfoss (loan)	2008	1. deild karla	10	1	0	0	0	0	-		-		10	1
Sarpsborg 08 (loan)	2013	Tippeligaen	9	0	2	0	-		-		-		11	0
Loan Total		33	6	3	0	0	0	0	0	0	0	36	6	
GAIS	2014	Superettan	16	0	5	0	-		-		-		21	0
Fylkir	2015	Úrvalsdeild	20	0	2	0	6	0	-		-		28	0
Fylkir	2016	Úrvalsdeild	11	0	0	0	10	0	-		-		21	0
Fylkir	2017	1. deild karla	20	0	4	0	9	0	-		-		33	0
Fylkir	Fylkir Total		51	0	6	0	25	0	0	0	0	0	82	0
Career total			188	7	23	1	64	0	2	0	0	0	277	8

== Other ==
Ásgeirsson is a former member of a heavy metal band, and likes to listen to rock music when preparing for games.
