= François D'Onofrio =

Belgian footballer (born 1990)

Personal information
- Date of birth: 6 October 1990 (age 36)
- Place of birth: Liège, Belgium
- Height: 1.80 m (5 ft 11 in)
- Position: Full-back

Youth career
- 2008–2009: Standard Liège

Senior career*
| Years | Team | Apps | (Gls) |
| 2009–2011 | Standard Liège B | | |
| 2010 | Standard Liège | 1 | (0) |
| 2012–2013 | Olhanense | 6 | (0) |
| 2014–2016 | Seraing | 41 | (1) |
| 2016–2017 | Penafiel | 0 | (0) |
| 2018–2020 | Lierse Kempenzonen | 20 | (0) |
| 2020–2022 | Seraing | 8 | (0) |
- * Club domestic league appearances and goals

François D'Onofrio (born 6 October 1990), also known as Francesco D'Onofrio, is a Belgian former professional footballer who played as a full-back. He also holds Italian citizenship.

== Career ==
D'Onofrio made his professional debut in the Belgian First Division A for Standard Liège on 27 November 2010 in a game against Lierse.

In the summer 2018, D'Onofrio joined Lierse Kempenzonen. In January 2020, he was sent down to Lierse's B-team alongside Kassim Doumbia.

D'Onofrio retired from playing in November 2022.
