= Richard Arends =

Dutch footballer (born 1990)

Personal information
- Date of birth: 5 September 1990 (age 36)
- Place of birth: Opheusden, Netherlands
- Height: 1.87 m (6 ft 2 in)
- Position: Goalkeeper

Youth career
- DFS
- N.E.C.

Senior career*
Years	Team	Apps	(Gls)
2009–2014	FC Oss	72	(0)
2014–2015	DFS		
2015	Keflavík	7	(0)
2015–2017	Spakenburg	5	(0)
2017–2021	Kozakken Boys	68	(0)
- * Club domestic league appearances and goals as of 28 March 2022

Richard Arends (born 5 September 1990) is a Dutch footballer who last played as a goalkeeper for Kozakken Boys in the Dutch Tweede Divisie.

== Club career ==
He played for FC Oss, SV DFS and moved abroad for a spell in Iceland with Keflavík FC. He returned to Holland in summer 2015 to join SV Spakenburg. From the 2017–18 season, Arends began playing for Kozakken Boys. In January 2021, it was announced that he would leave at the end of the season.
