= Hörður Ingi Gunnarsson =

Icelandic footballer

Personal information
- Full name: Hörður Ingi Gunnarsson
- Date of birth: 14 August 1998 (age 28)
- Place of birth: Reykjavík, Iceland
- Height: 1.84 m (6 ft 0 in)
- Position: Left-back

Team information
- Current team: Valur
- Number: 3

Youth career
- –2014: FH

Senior career*
Years	Team	Apps	(Gls)
2014–2018	FH	0	(0)
2017	→ Víkingur Ólafsvík (loan)	7	(0)
2017	→ HK (loan)	10	(0)
2018–2019	ÍA	41	(2)
2020–2021	FH	38	(0)
2022	Sogndal	23	(2)
2023–2024	FH	8	(1)
2024–	Valur	44	(1)

International career^{‡}
2014	Iceland U16	4	(0)
2015	Iceland U17	2	(0)
2016	Iceland U19	5	(0)
2017–2021	Iceland U21	18	(0)
2021–	Iceland	2	(0)
- * Club domestic league appearances and goals as of 16 November 2026 ‡ National team caps and goals as of 15:22, 11 November 2022 (UTC)

Hörður Ingi Gunnarsson (born 14 August 1998) is an Icelandic footballer who plays as a left-back for Valur and the Iceland national team.

== Career ==
Gunnarsson made his international debut for Iceland on 29 May 2021 in a friendly match against Mexico in Arlington, Texas.

== Career statistics ==
=== International ===
As of 11 November 2022

Iceland
Year	Apps	Goals
2021	1	0
2022	1	0
Total	2	0
