= Arnar Viðarsson =

Icelandic footballer and manager (born 1978)

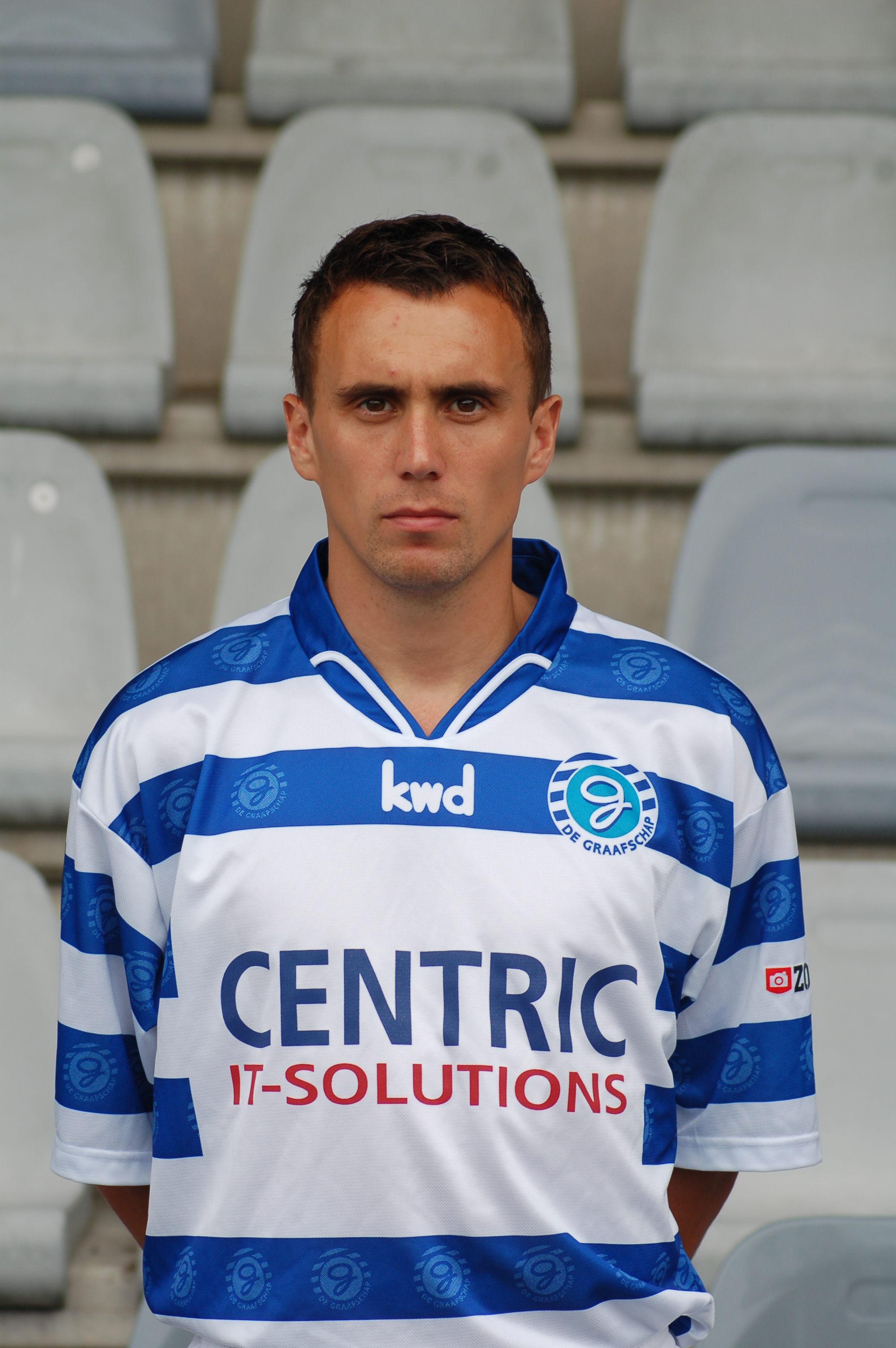
- Viðarsson with De Graafschap in 2007

Personal information
- Full name: Arnar Þór Viðarsson
- Date of birth: 15 March 1978 (age 48)
- Place of birth: Reykjavík, Iceland
- Height: 1.77 m (5 ft 10 in)
- Positions: Defensive midfielder; left-back

Senior career*
Years	Team	Apps	(Gls)
1996–1997	FH	35	(3)
1997–2006	Lokeren	235	(6)
1997	→ Lillestrøm (loan)	6	(0)
1998	→ FH (loan)	4	(0)
1998	→ Genk (trial)	0	(0)
2006–2008	Twente	11	(0)
2007–2008	→ De Graafschap (loan)	32	(1)
2008–2014	Cercle Brugge	157	(0)
Total		480	(10)

International career
1993	Iceland U16	8	(0)
1993–1994	Iceland U17	7	(0)
1995–1996	Iceland U19	11	(0)
1996–1999	Iceland U21	17	(0)
1998–2007	Iceland	52	(2)

Managerial career
- 2014: Cercle Brugge (assistant)
- 2014–2015: Cercle Brugge
- 2015–2018: Lokeren (assistant and U21)
- 2018: Lokeren (caretaker)
- 2018–2019: Lokeren (assistant and U21)
- 2019–2020: Iceland U21
- 2020–2023: Iceland
- * Club domestic league appearances and goals

Arnar Þór Viðarsson (transliterated as Arnar Thor Vidarsson; born 15 March 1978) is an Icelandic football coach and a former player who played as a midfielder.

He last played for Belgian Pro League side Cercle Brugge, where he was also employed as head coach. He was the head coach of Iceland men's national team from 2020 to 2023. He became the sporting director of KAA Gent at the end of the 2023–24 season

== Club career ==
Arnar started his career in FH, and moved to Belgium to play for Sporting Lokeren. He returned to FH for a short period and he also had a loan spell at Lillestrøm SK and a trial at then Cup holders Genk, appearing as a substitute for the club in the Belgian Supercup against reigning champions Club Brugge in August 1998. Genk lost the match 2–1. However, he was passed on by Genk after that window.

He has played for Sporting Lokeren from October 1998 until 2006, playing as a left-back in his early years. In his fourth season at Daknam, he was steadily modified into a defensive midfielder by then coach Paul Put. He became club captain in the summer of 2001, following Chris Janssens's departure to Dutch Willem II. Upon his arrival, the club signed many Icelandic players such as midfielder Rúnar Kristinsson who holds the Icelandic record for most international caps.

Arnar's biggest achievement as a Lokeren player was finishing in third place in the 2002–03 season, behind champions Club Brugge and runners-up Anderlecht. Lokeren's midfield triangle was all-Icelandic consisting of himself, Rúnar Kristinsson and Arnar Grétarsson. Two seasons earlier, they had already managed to finish in fourth.

In 2006, he transferred to FC Twente, where he signed a contract until 2009. For the 2007–08 season he was loaned out to newly promoted De Graafschap, before eventually returning to Belgium, playing for Cercle Brugge, where he ended his career as a player in the summer of 2014, becoming assistant under head coach Lorenzo Staelens. Following the sacking of Staelens on October of that same year, Arnar was appointed head coach.

== International career ==
Arnar was capped 52 times for Iceland, scoring 2 goals, as well as 41 times at youth level. He made his debut for the seniors in a June 1998 friendly match against South Africa.

== Personal life ==
Arnar is the brother of fellow Icelandic midfielders Bjarni and Davíð, and the son of Icelandic footballer Viðar Halldórsson.

== Managerial statistics ==
As of match played 30 March 2023

Team	From	To	Record				
Team	From	To	G	W	D	L	Win %
Cercle Brugge	6 October 2014	18 March 2015	25	6	3	16	24.00
Lokeren (caretaker)	28 October 2018	1 November 2018	1	0	1	0	0.00
Iceland U21	4 January 2019	21 December 2020	13	8	1	4	61.54
Iceland	22 December 2020	30 March 2023	31	6	13	12	19.35
Total			70	20	18	32	28.57
