= Jonathan Hendrickx =

Belgian footballer (born 1993)

Personal information
- Full name: Jonathan Kevin C. Hendrickx
- Date of birth: 25 December 1993 (age 32)
- Place of birth: Court-Saint-Étienne, Belgium
- Height: 1.72 m (5 ft 7 1/2 in)
- Position: Right-back

Team information
- Current team: Tubize-Braine
- Number: 15

Youth career
- Standard Liège

Senior career*
Years	Team	Apps	(Gls)
2012–2014	Fortuna Sittard	40	(0)
2014–2017	FH	49	(0)
2017	Leixões	2	(0)
2018–2019	Breiðablik	29	(2)
2019–2021	Lommel	36	(8)
2021	KA Akureyri	9	(1)
2021–2022	Lierse Kempenzonen	24	(2)
2022–2023	URSL Visé	28	(6)
2023–2025	Tubize-Braine	59	(9)
2025–2026	Union Rochefortoise	10	(1)
2026–	Tubize-Braine	13	(2)
- * Club domestic league appearances and goals as of 28 June 2026

Jonathan Kevin C. Hendrickx (born 25 December 1993) is a Belgian professional footballer who plays as a right back for Tubize-Braine.

== Club career ==
On 1 February 2021, after a year-and-a-half in Belgium, Hendrickx moved to Iceland for a third time, joining Úrvalsdeild side KA Akureyri.

== Personal life ==
Jonathan is the older brother of fellow professional footballer Gaëtan Hendrickx.
