= Bjarni Viðarsson =

Icelandic footballer

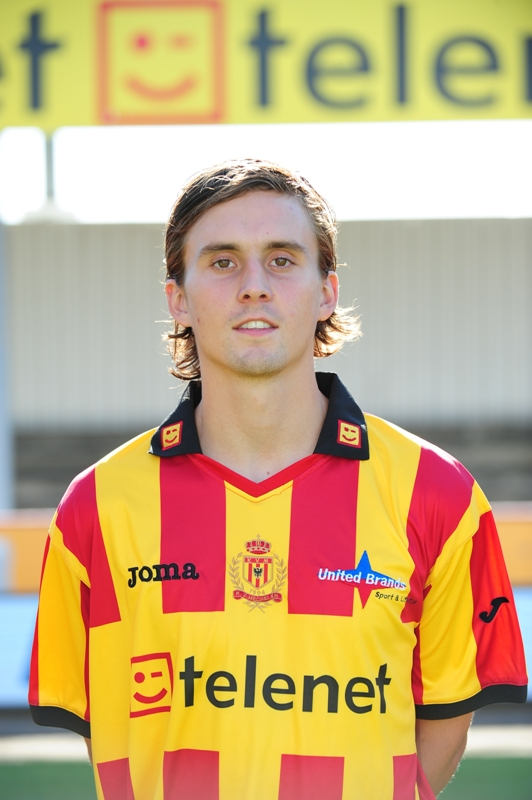

Personal information
- Full name: Bjarni Þór Viðarsson
- Date of birth: 5 March 1988 (age 38)
- Place of birth: Reykjavík, Iceland
- Height: 1.87 m (6 ft 2 in)
- Position: Midfielder

Youth career
- FH

Senior career*
Years	Team	Apps	(Gls)
2004–2008	Everton	0	(0)
2007	→ AFC Bournemouth (loan)	6	(1)
2008	→ Twente (loan)	0	(0)
2008–2009	Twente	0	(0)
2009–2010	Roeselare	24	(6)
2010–2012	Mechelen	16	(0)
2012–2014	Silkeborg IF	28	(1)
2015–2018	FH	47	(4)
Total		121	(12)

International career
2003–2004	Iceland U17	16	(2)
2005–2007	Iceland U19	16	(8)
2005–2011	Iceland U21	26	(6)
2008	Iceland	1	(0)
- * Club domestic league appearances and goals

Bjarni Þór Viðarsson (transliterated as Bjarni Thor Vidarsson; born 5 March 1988) is an Icelandic former footballer who played as a midfielder. He played in England, the Netherlands, Belgium and Denmark during his career and was also a full international.

== Club career ==
Bjarni Viðarsson joined Everton from Icelandic side FH Hafnarfjörður in the summer of 2004. He has spent the majority of his time with the academy side and the reserves, before training with the first team. He was an unused substitute in the 2–0 defeat to Newcastle United at St. James' Park in late February 2006. One month later he signed his first professional contract at Everton, signing a two-year deal.

On 5 February 2007 he joined AFC Bournemouth on loan for a month. Bjarni was deployed not in his natural center midfield position, by manager Kevin Bond, but on the left of midfield. He scored one goal against Oldham Athletic in his spell with Bournemouth before he was recalled by Everton because of an injury to Tim Cahill.

Bjarni made his senior debut for Everton on 20 December 2007 as a substitute in the UEFA Cup, away to AZ.

On 29 January 2008, it was announced that Bjarni would join Dutch side FC Twente on loan.

On 14 May 2008, he signed for Twente on a permanent basis.

In the summer of 2009, Bjarni signed a four-year deal to sign for Belgium Jupiler League Team Roeselare, making his debut in a 5–1 defeat to Gent.

He once again transferred, this time to KV Mechelen in Summer 2010.

On 3 August 2012, he signed a four-year deal with the Danish club, Silkeborg IF.

== International ==
Bjarni Viðarsson made his international debut for the Iceland U17s in July 2003 and progressed through the youth setup. At only eighteen years of age, he played for the U21s in several qualifiers for the 2007 European Championships. He became a regular during qualification for the 2009 edition and eventually captained the U21s. In February 2008, he made his one and only appearance for Iceland at senior level, playing in a 2–0 loss to Belarus.

== Personal life ==
Bjarni Viðarsson is from a footballing family; his brothers Arnar and Davíð have both represented Iceland internationally. Their father, Viðar Halldórsson was also a professional footballer.
