= Jérémy Serwy =

Belgian footballer

Personal information
- Date of birth: 4 June 1991 (age 35)
- Place of birth: Liège, Belgium
- Height: 1.72 m (5 ft 8 in)
- Position: Midfielder

Senior career*
Years	Team	Apps	(Gls)
2010–2011	Charleroi	27	(3)
2011–2013	Zulte Waregem	23	(3)
2013	→ White Star Woluwe (loan)	14	(2)
2013–2014	Borussia Dortmund II	6	(0)
2014–2015	Újpest	0	(0)
2015–2016	FH	34	(4)
2017–2018	Virton	25	(1)
2019	US Hostert	12	(1)
2021–2023	FC Wiltz 71	8	(0)
- * Club domestic league appearances and goals as of 23:11, 7 July 2022 (UTC)

Jérémy Serwy (born 4 June 1991) is a professional footballer who plays as a midfielder.
