= Kassim Doumbia =

Malian footballer

Personal information
- Full name: Kassim Doumba
- Date of birth: 6 October 1990 (age 36)
- Place of birth: Bamako, Mali
- Height: 1.83 m (6 ft 0 in)
- Position: Centre back

Team information
- Current team: Roeselare

Youth career
- –2008: ASKO

Senior career*
Years	Team	Apps	(Gls)
2009–2011	Gent	0	(0)
2010–2011	→ Brussels (loan)	29	(3)
2011–2014	Waasland-Beveren	43	(2)
2014–2017	FH	72	(9)
2018–2019	Maribor	0	(0)
2019–	Lierse Kempenzonen	9	(1)
- * Club domestic league appearances and goals as of 25 September 2019

Kassim Doumbia (born 6 October 1990) is a Malian footballer who plays as a defender for Roeselare.

He has previously played for ASKO, Gent, Brussels, Waasland-Beveren, FH, and Maribor.

== Career ==
Kassim Doumbia started playing football on the streets of the Malian capital Bamako. His first club in his home country was ASKO. In the winter of the 2008–09 season, he signed a contract with the Belgian club Gent, where he spent his first half of the season in Gent's B team.

In his second season, the club promoted him to the first team. He did not, however, play any official matches during the 2009–10 season. In 2010, he was put out on a year-long loan to the second division side Brussels.

In June 2011, he signed a contract with Waasland-Beveren for the next two seasons, and at the beginning of his time with the club, they were promoted to the Belgian Pro League. On 22 December 2012 he scored his first goal for his club in a 2–2 away tie against Cercle Brugge.

In April 2014, he signed a two-year contract with the Icelandic club FH Hafnarfjörður and prolonged his contract for two more years until the end of 2017. With FH, he won two Icelandic championships.

In December 2017, he signed with the Slovenian club Maribor. In January 2019, he left the club without making a single appearance in official matches after his contract was mutually terminated. Doumbia then joined Belgian club Lierse Kempenzonen in the summer 2019. In January 2020, he was sent down to Lierse's B-team alongside François D'Onofrio.
