= Fylkisvöllur =

Sports venue in Reykjavík, Iceland

(Iceland) Fylkisvöllur
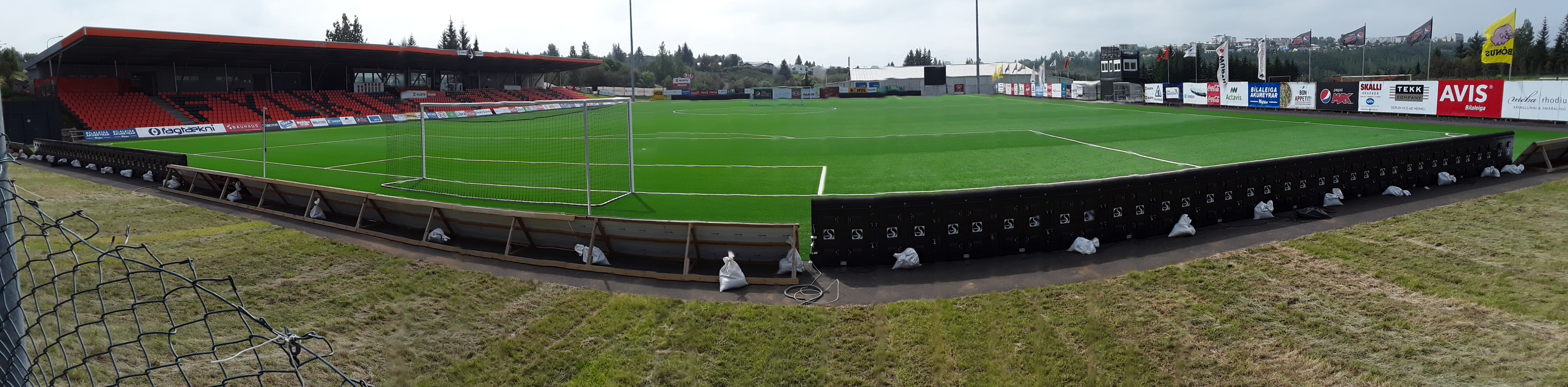
- Interactive map of (Iceland) Fylkisvöllur
- Location: Árbær, Reykjavík, Iceland
- Coordinates: 64.1133964°N 21.7954589°W
- Capacity: 1,800

Tenants
- Fylkir; FC Árbær; Ellíði

Fylkisvöllur (Icelandic pronunciation: [ˈfɪl̥cɪsˌvœtlʏr̥], lit. 'Fylkir Field' or more precisely 'Fylkir Stadium') is a multi-use stadium in Reykjavík, Iceland. It is currently used mostly for football matches.

The stadium holds roughly 1800 spectators seated. The name for the stadium was changed to Flórídana völlurinn in 2015 and Würth völlurinn in 2019 due to sponsorship reasons
