= Andrés Már Jóhannesson =

Icelandic footballer (born 1988)

Personal information
- Date of birth: 21 December 1988 (age 37)
- Place of birth: Reykjavík, Iceland
- Height: 1.77 m (5 ft 10 in)
- Position: Midfielder

Senior career*
Years	Team	Apps	(Gls)
2005–2011	Fylkir	87	(6)
2011–2014	Haugesund	17	(0)
2013	→ Fylkir (loan)	10	(4)
2014–2020	Fylkir	115	(7)
Total		229	(17)

International career
2006–2007	Iceland U-19	3	(0)
2007–2011	Iceland U-21	11	(0)
2016	Iceland	1	(0)
- * Club domestic league appearances and goals

Andrés Már Jóhannesson (born 21 December 1988) is an Icelandic former professional footballer who played as a midfielder.

== Club career ==
Andrés was born in Reykjavík. He made his debut for Haugesund on 3 August 2011 against Sogndal, in a 4–0 win.

In 2013, he was loaned out to his former club Fylkir but Haugesund recalled him back in August. In 2014, he completed a permanent move back to Fylkir signing a two-year contract.

== Career statistics ==
As of 16 January 2016

Season	Club	Division	League		Cup		Total	
Season	Club	Division	Apps	Goals	Apps	Goals	Apps	Goals
2005	Fylkir	Úrvalsdeild	1	0	0	0	1	0
2006	Fylkir	Úrvalsdeild	1	0	0	0	1	0
2007	Fylkir	Úrvalsdeild	16	0	3	1	19	1
2008	Fylkir	Úrvalsdeild	19	1	3	0	22	1
2009	Fylkir	Úrvalsdeild	18	0	3	1	21	1
2010	Fylkir	Úrvalsdeild	20	4	1	0	21	4
2011	Fylkir	Úrvalsdeild	12	1	1	0	13	1
2011	Haugesund	Tippeligaen	7	0	0	0	7	0
2012	Haugesund	Tippeligaen	10	0	4	2	14	2
2013	Fylkir (loan)	Úrvalsdeild	10	4	2	0	12	4
2014	Fylkir	Úrvalsdeild	18	1	1	0	17	1
2015	Fylkir	Úrvalsdeild	22	2	3	0	25	2
Career Total			154	13	21	4	173	17
