= Fylkir =

Multi-sport club in Árbær, Reykjavík, Iceland

- Full name: Íþróttafélagið Fylkir
- Nickname: Fylkismenn
- Short name: FYL
- Founded: 28 May 1967; 59 years ago (as KSÁ)
- Ground: Fylkisvöllur, Reykjavík, Iceland
- Capacity: 5,000 (1,900 seated)
- Club Chairman: Björn Gíslason
- Football Chairman: Ragnar Páll Bjarnason
- Manager: Heimir Guðjónsson
- League: 1. deild karla
- 2025: 1. deild karla, 8th of 12
- Website: fylkir.is
Home colours	Away colours

Íþróttafélagið Fylkir (Icelandic pronunciation: [ˈiːˌθrouhtaˌfjɛːˌlaijɪð ˈfɪl̥cɪr̥], lit. 'Fylkir Sports Club' (Note: Íþróttafélagið is the definite form of Íþróttafélag, meaning "the sports club".)) is a multi-sport club in Árbær, in the eastern part of Reykjavík, the capital of Iceland. It features departments in football, handball, volleyball, gymnastics and karate.

== Kit ==
The Fylkir official home kit is combined of an orange jersey, black shorts and orange socks. The away kit is combined of a blue jersey and shorts and white socks. The original kit is combined of a white and blue shirt, white shorts and white socks (alternatively blue socks).

== History ==
Fylkir was founded in 1967 on May 28 in a newly established suburb of Reykjavik, Árbær, by young and enthusiastic footballers who wanted to train and play football in their own neighbourhood. From the start, the club has emphasized the importance of youth development and for the first years Fylkir did not field a senior team. The original name of the club was KSÁ (Knattspyrnufélag Seláss og Árbæjar), the name was considered inconvenient and thus after a member vote, it was changed to Fylkir.

The senior team took first part in a national competition in 1972 and became that year second in their heat in the Icelandic 3. division. That was not enough to for Fylkir to gain promotion and for five successive years the team played in Division Three. All these years Fylkir was on the edge of promotion but it was not until 1977 that the dream came true. Fylkir earned a promotion to the 2. division after a historical Third Division Final in which Fylkir had to field its B-team because the majority of the normally starting eleven had gone to Spain on a long before pre-paid holiday!

The next six years, Fylkir played in Division Two, only once being close to gaining promotion. From 1984 to 1988, Fylkir roller-coasted between the Second and the Third Division and it was not until 1989 that Fylkir played its first season in Division One – the top league in Iceland at that time. The season was no success, Fylkir became ninth and was relegated, but the season is nevertheless an interesting one as three players – Kristinn Tómasson, Þórhallur Dan Jóhannsson and Finnur Kolbeinsson – who are now legends at the club, played their first season at a top level.

The next time Fylkir earned a promotion to Division One was in 1993, but just as in 1989 the team became ninth and was relegated. In 1996, history reapeted itself for the third successive time, Fylkir occupied the club's seemingly beloved ninth place and was once again relegated to Division Two.

In the year 1999, Fylkir was promoted to the top league – now called the Premier League – for the fourth time. The following year of 2000 Fylkir was only two points from winning the league, in its first year after promotion. The second place earned the club its first games in a European competition.

In 2001, Fylkir won the Icelandic Cup for the first time, but finished fifth in the Premier League after leading the competition for the first two-thirds of it. In the UEFA cup, Fylkir won Pogoń Szczecin from Poland 2–1 in the club's first European game. In Poland, Fylkir equalized in the last minute of the game to the euphoria of its 200 dedicated supporters who had travelled to Poland to support their team. 3–2 in aggregate and Fylkir were through to the second Qualifying Round. The opponents, Roda JC Kerkrade from the Netherlands, proved to be stronger than the Poles. Roda won the first game in the Netherlands, 3–0, a game in which football played a side role as it took place September 11. In Iceland, Fylkir scored the first goal, but the Dutch side the next three, ending the European adventure for Fylkir.

The Cup victory in 2001 earned Fylkir a spot in the UEFA cup for the second successive year, the opponents this time being Royal Excelsior Mouscron from Belgium. The teams drew 1–1 in Iceland and Mouscron won the game in Belgium 3–1. In the Icelandic Premier League 2002, Fylkir became second after a last minute battle with KR. Fylkir repeated the Cup success and won the competition for the second year in a row.

Forty years after its establishment, Fylkir is still a club with strong roots in its neighbourhood and the majority of its players and staff are born and bred in Arbaer. The club is now one of the bigger clubs in Iceland and the senior side has established itself as a prominent Premier League team after years of constant travelling between divisions.

In the season of 2006, Fylkir was not a big success. They finished 8th, staying in the Premier League by only two points. Instead, Grindavík were relegated after getting a 1–1 draw against the Icelandic Champions, FH, when they needed to win.

2007 proved to be a good year for Fylkir, after sitting firmly at the middle of the table all season, Fylkir ended up in 4th place, earning a spot in the UEFA Intertoto Cup in 2008. Fylkir also reached the VISA-Cup semi-final but a shocking loss to 1st Division team Fjölnir ended their hopes for a third Cup win during the decade.

2007 was also a good year for Fylkir U20 team as they won the Icelandic division for U20 teams for the first time in the club's history.

2008 proved to be a rather difficult season for Fylkir. They started the season with two defeats, but then followed three victories and things were starting to look good. But then the troubles really begun, a terrible run of games sent Fylkir into the relegation zone. On 28 August 2008 Fylkir sacked manager Leifur Garðarsson and Sverrir Sverrisson stepped in as caretaker manager for the rest of the season. Fylkir managed to stay out of relegation and ended up in 9th place with 22 points. The 2008 season in Iceland was the first one with 12 teams. Fylkir reached the VISA-Cup semi-final but lost to Fjölnir for a second time in a row. They lost 3–4 after a thrilling match which was very hard for the supporters to take.

In the first round of the 2008 Intertoto Cup, Fylkir managed a 2–1 first leg victory in Latvia against FK Rīga. However, the visiting club won the return leg 2–0, taking the tie 3–2 on aggregate.

At the start of October 2008 Fylkir announced Ólafur Þórðarson as their new manager. Ólafur had worked for the club before, he was a player/manager for two seasons 1998 and 1999. His first season in 2009 proved very successful as Fylkir finished 3rd in the league, only 8 points behind champions FH, which gave the club a spot in the Europa League. So there were good expectations before the season in 2010 but the team failed to repeat the success from the earlier season. Fylkir finished 9th and stayed out of relegation with two wins in the last two home games against two bottom half teams Grindavík and Haukar who eventually got relegated.

In the first round of the 2010 Europa League, Fylkir was drawn against Torpedo-BelAZ Zhodino from Belarus. The Eastern Europe team dominated the tie and won comfortably 6–1 on aggregate.

In 2011 Fylkir ended the season in 7th place in a season who had many ups and downs. The team managed to stay out of the relegation battle, which was a step up from the earlier season. But things got tougher as the club sold one of their key players when Andrés Már Jóhannesson signed for Norwegian club FK Haugesund in the beginning of August. Also many senior players had injuries in the second half of the season, which meant that the team average age was relatively low in the last games of the season. Club legend Gylfi Einarsson returned after 10 years as a professional footballer. Gylfi scored in the first match, but struggled with injuries and was forced to retire from football at the end of the season. Ólafur Þórðarson left his job as a manager after the season, and Ásmundur Arnarsson was appointed manager in October. Ásmundur had managed neighbour club Fjölnir for seven years before joining Fylkir, and as mentioned earlier had knocked Fylkir out of the cup semi-finals in 2007 and 2008.

The new manager had a difficult start with some bad results in pre-season. Some Icelandic football experts predicted that Fylkir would have a very difficult season, and named them as one of the favourites to get relegated. But the 2012 season turned out to be fine as the team finished 7th and where actually only few seconds away from reaching 6th, but Grindavik equaliser against Fylkir in the 95-minute of the last game prevented that from happening. Ingimundur Níels Óskarsson gave a big contribution with 10 league goals and the only foreigner in the team Irish center half David Elebert gave the team a much needed defensive stability.

2013 season started dreadfully as Fylkir had their worst start in the club's history. After the first half of the season (11 matches) the team only had 4 points, with 7 losses, 4 draws and not a single win. But a remarkable second round saw the club slowly reaching out of the relegation spots and get into a more comfortable position. The big turnaround is largely thanks to the board's decision to keep Ásmundur Arnarsson as a manager and some player changes made in the transfer window. Local hero Ásgeir Börkur Ásgeirsson returned after a loan spell at Norwegian club Sarpsborg 08 FF and made an instant impact with an explosive performance against Valur in his first game. That was Fylkir's twelfth game and their long waited first win of the season. Andrés Már Jóhannesson who came on loan from FK Haugesund at the end of May, got back to his best form after being injured for a long period, and produced some brilliant performances in the following games, before heading back to Norway in the middle of August. But undoubtedly the best player of the season was striker Viðar Örn Kjartansson who finished one of the league top scorer with 13 goals. The team once again finished in 7th place, the third year in a row.

Fylkir had been a top division side for 16 consecutive years (since 2000) until relegation in 2016 and had the second longest run in the top division, with KR being the only team with a longer stay (since 1979).

== Achievements/Honours ==
=== Football ===
Men:

- Bikarkeppni karla (Domestic cup): 2

2001, 2002

- Úrvalsdeild karla (League) (tier 1): 0

Best achievement: Runners-up: 2000, 2002

- 1.deild karla (League) (tier 2): 5

1992, 1995, 1999, 2017, 2022

- 2.deild karla (League) (tier 3): 3

1977, 1984, 1987

Women:

- Úrvalsdeild kvenna (League) (tier 1): 0

Best achievement: 5th place (3) 2009, 2010, 2014

- 1.deild kvenna (League) (tier 2): 3

2005, 2013, 2018

- Bikarkeppni kvenna (Domestic cup): 0

Best achievement: Semi Finals (7) 2009, 2011, 2013, 2014, 2015, 2018, 2009

== European games ==
As of 1 April 2020

Competition	Matches	W	D	L	GF	GA
UEFA Europa League	10	1	3	6	7	19
UEFA Intertoto Cup	4	1	0	3	3	6
TOTAL	14	2	3	9	10	25

=== UEFA Europa League ===
- 2001: Fylkir – (Poland) Pogoń Szczecin (2–1)
- 2001: Pogoń Szczecin – Fylkir (1–1)
- 2001: (Netherlands) Roda JC Kerkrade – Fylkir (3–0)
- 2001: Fylkir – Roda JC Kerkrade (1–3)
- 2002: Fylkir – (Belgium) Royal Excelsior Mouscron (1–1)
- 2002: Royal Excelsior Mouscron – Fylkir (3–1)
- 2003: (Sweden) AIK – Fylkir (1–0)
- 2003: Fylkir – AIK (0–0)
- 2010: (Belarus) Torpedo-BelAZ Zhodino – Fylkir (3–0)
- 2010: Fylkir – Torpedo-BelAZ Zhodino (1–3)

=== Intertoto Cup ===
- 2004: Fylkir – (Belgium) KAA Gent (0–1)
- 2004: KAA Gent – Fylkir (2–1)
- 2008: (Latvia) FK Rīga – Fylkir (1–2)
- 2008: Fylkir – FK Rīga (0–2)

== Sports played ==
Besides football, Fylkir participates in volleyball, handball, gymnastics, and karate.

== Stadium ==
The Fylkir stadium is called Fylkisvöllur meaning simply "Fylkir Stadium." Up until Fylkir's promotion to Premier League in 1999, Fylkir had no stadium seats but a comfortable grass hill was sufficient to the thousands of dedicated supporters who followed the team. After the promotion, concrete stands were put in, merely to make it a legal stadium for the Premier League. Since then the Icelandic Football Association has changed the rules, which left Fylkir with a stadium that met no requirements. Fylkir and Reykjavik City Council reached an agreement in January 2013 regarding the reconstruction of the stadium. In the 2014 season Fylkir's supporters finally got a fully comprehensive stadium with a roof. The seated capacity also enlarged from 830 to 1854.

== Official supporters club ==
Fylkir's official supporters club is called Kiddi Tomm, named after a former Fylkir player, Kristinn Tomasson, who was a leading striker for Fylkir all his career except playing for Fram one season. The club was formed before the 2007 season, following several previous supporters clubs of Fylkir. The club voted defender Kristjan Valdimarsson as their player of the year for the 2007 season. Their website is fylkismenn.is

== Local pub ==
The local pub is called Blásteinn (e. Blue Stone). Fylkir supporters gather at Blásteinn before and after matches, sometimes being joined by Fylkir players and coaches.

== Sponsors ==
=== Kit sponsors from 1989 ===
- 1989:Henson
- 1990-1991:Adidas
- 1992–1994:ABM
- 1995: Errea
- 1996–1998:Berri
- 1999–2002:Lotto
- 2003–2010:Umbro
- 2011–2014:Hummel
- 2015–2018:Jako
- 2019–present: Macron

=== Official sponsors from 1989 ===
- 1989: Volvo
- 1990-1991: Laser Personal Computer
- 1992–2004: Nóatún
- 2005–2016: Bónus
- 2017–2019: Würth
- 2020–present: Eykt

== Current squad ==
As of 22 July 2026

Note: Flags indicate national team as defined under FIFA eligibility rules; some limited exceptions apply. Players may hold more than one non-FIFA nationality.

No.	Pos.	Nation	Player
1	GK	ISL	Ólafur Kristófer Helgason
3	DF	ISL	Arnór Breki Ásþórsson
4	DF	ISL	Hlynur Sævar Jónsson
5	DF	ISL	Orri Sveinn Stefánsson
6	MF	ISL	Guðfinnur Þór Leósson
7	FW	ISL	Máni Austmann Hilmarsson
9	FW	ISL	Eyþór Aron Wöhler
10	FW	ISL	Benedikt Daríus Garðarsson
11	FW	ISL	Magnús Daði Ottesen
13	DF	ISL	Þórður Ingi Ingimundarson
14	MF	ISL	Tumi Fannar Gunnarsson

No.	Pos.	Nation	Player
17	MF	ISL	Birkir Eyþórsson
18	MF	ISL	Nikulás Val Gunnarsson
20	MF	ISL	Theodór Ingi Óskarsson
23	DF	ISL	Aron Snær Gudbjörnsson
24	DF	ISL	Sigurbergur Áki Jörundsson
25	DF	ISL	Jóel Baldursson
30	GK	ISL	Kristófer Sigtryggsson
70	FW	ISL	Gudmundur Tyrfingsson
77	DF	ISL	Bjarki Steinsen Arnarsson
92	FW	ISL	Kári Sigfússon

=== Out on loan ===
Note: Flags indicate national team as defined under FIFA eligibility rules; some limited exceptions apply. Players may hold more than one non-FIFA nationality.

No.	Pos.	Nation	Player

=== Coaching staff ===
Position	Name
Head coach	(Iceland) Heimir Guðjónsson
Assistant coach	(Iceland) Kristófer Sigurgeirsson
Goalkeeping coach	(Iceland) Björn Metúsalem Aðalsteinsson
Fitness coach	(Iceland) Arnór Gauti Brynjólfsson
Physio	(Iceland) Ólafur Engilbert Árnason
Masseur	(Iceland) Óðinn Svansson
Kit manager	(Iceland) Halldór Steinsson
Kit manager	(Iceland) Ágúst Aron Gunnarsson

=== Fylkismenn.is supporters player of the year award ===
- 2007 – Kristján Valdimarsson
- 2008 – Valur Fannar Gíslason
- 2009 – Andrés Már Jóhannesson
- 2010 – Andrés Már Jóhannesson
- 2011 – Albert Brynjar Ingason
- 2012 – David Elebert
- 2013 – Viðar Örn Kjartansson
- 2014 – Kristján Valdimarsson
- 2015 – Albert Brynjar Ingason
- 2016 – Garðar Jóhannsson

=== Player of the year award ===
- 2017 – Ásgeir Börkur Ásgeirsson
- 2018 – Ólafur Ingi Skúlason
- 2019 – Helgi Valur Daníelsson

=== Managerial history ===
Name	Years
(Iceland) Óskar Sigurðsson	1972–73
(Iceland) Theodór Guðmundsson	1974–76
(Iceland) Axel Axelsson	1977
(Iceland) Theodór Guðmundsson	1978–79
(Iceland) Gylfi Gíslason	1980
(Iceland) Theodór Guðmundsson	1981
(Iceland) Lárus Loftsson	1982
(Iceland) Axel Axelsson	1983
(Iceland) Ólafur Magnússon	1984–85
(Iceland) Marteinn Geirsson	1986–91
(Iceland) Magnús Jónatansson	1992–93
(Iceland) Bjarni Jóhannsson	1994
(Iceland) Magnús Pálsson	1995–96
(Iceland) Margeir Þórir Sigfússon (Caretaker)	1996
(Iceland) Atli Eðvaldsson	1997
(Iceland) Ólafur Þórðarson	1998–99
(Iceland) Bjarni Jóhannsson	2000–01
(Iceland) Aðalsteinn Víglundsson	2002–03
(Iceland) Þorlákur Árnason	2004–05
(Iceland) Sverrir Sverrisson (Iceland) Jón Sveinsson (Caretakers)	2005
(Iceland) Leifur Garðarsson	2006–08
(Iceland) Sverrir Sverrisson (Caretaker)	2008
(Iceland) Ólafur Þórðarson	2009–11
(Iceland) Ásmundur Arnarsson	2012–15
(Iceland) Hermann Hreiðarsson	2015–16
(Iceland) Helgi Sigurðsson	2016–19
(Iceland) Atli Sveinn Þórarinsson (Iceland) Ólafur Ingi Stígsson	2019-2021
(Iceland) Rúnar Páll Sigmundsson	2021-2024
(Iceland) Árni Freyr Guðnason	2024-2025
(Iceland) Arnar Grétarsson	2025
(Iceland) Heimir Guðjónsson	2025
