= Davíð Viðarsson =

Icelandic footballer

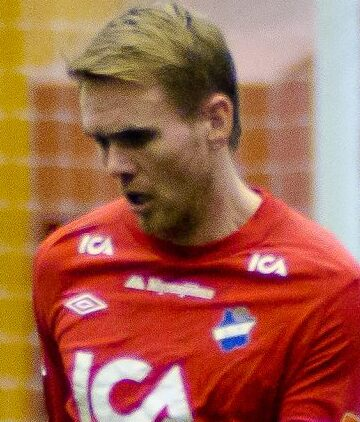
- Viðarsson with Öster in 2012

Personal information
- Full name: Davíð Þór Viðarsson
- Date of birth: 24 April 1984 (age 42)
- Place of birth: Reykjavík, Iceland
- Height: 1.85 m (6 ft 1 in)
- Position: Midfielder

Senior career*
Years	Team	Apps	(Gls)
2000–2001	FH	19	(1)
2002–2004	Lillestrøm	13	(0)
2004–2009	FH	95	(8)
2006–2007	→ Lokeren (loan)	2	(0)
2010–2012	Öster	72	(7)
2012–2013	Vejle Kolding	23	(0)
2013–2019	FH	124	(2)

International career^{‡}
1999–2000	Iceland U17	11	(1)
2001–2002	Iceland U19	9	(2)
2002–2006	Iceland U21	16	(0)
2007–2017	Iceland	9	(0)
- * Club domestic league appearances and goals as of 11 August 2019 ‡ National team caps and goals as of 8 February 2017

Davíð Þór Viðarsson (born 24 April 1984) is an Icelandic former footballer who played as a midfielder for FH and the Iceland national team.

He was the club captain of Úrvalsdeild club FH Hafnarfjörður. He had previously played in the Norwegian Premier League with Lillestrøm SK and has represented his country on 9 occasions.

He signed for Swedish Superettan club Östers IF on a three-year contract in December 2009 .

On 14 August 2012, Davíð joined Danish 1st Division side Vejle Boldklub Kolding on a two-year contract.

== Personal life ==
Davíð is the brother of fellow Icelandic midfielders Arnar and Bjarni. Their father, Viðar Halldórsson, was also a professional footballer.

He is a candidate for the Independence Party in the 2017 election.
