= 2014 Fimleikafélag Hafnarfjarðar season =

FH
2014 season
- Manager: Heimir Guðjónsson
- Stadium: Kaplakrikavöllur
- Úrvalsdeild: 2nd
- Borgunarbikarinn: 32nd-finals
- Lengjubikarinn: 1st
- Top goalscorer: League: Atli Guðnason (10); All: Ingimundur Níels (15); Atli Guðnason (15); Kristján Gauti (15)
Home colours	Away colours

The 2014 season was FH's 30th season in Úrvalsdeild and their 14th consecutive season in top-flight of Icelandic Football.

Heimir Guðjónsson head coached the team for the 7th consecutive season and after a trophyless season in 2013 FH went into the season as one of the favorites for the title.

On 25 April FH won the Lengjubikarinn after a convincing win over Breiðablik 4–1

FH went through the 2014 league unbeaten until the last game where they met Stjarnan, who were also unbeaten, in a final for the title. FH lost the game on an injury time penalty and ended the season as runners-up in the league.

FH were defeated in the 32nd-finals of the Borgunarbikarinn by eventual winners KR on 28 May.

After a 2nd-place finish in 2013 FH earned a place in the Europa League Qualification. FH was drawn against Glenavon F.C. from N.Ireland in round 1. FH won the tie 6–2 and were drawn against FC Neman Grodno, from Belarus, in round 2. FH came on top with a 3–1 victory over the two legged tie. In the 3rd round FH were drawn against the Swedish team IF Elfsborg. FH lost the tie 5–3.

== First team ==
As of 23 October 2014. These players competed in Úrvalsdeild, Borgunarbikarinn, Lengjubikarinn, Europa League

Note: Flags indicate national team as defined under FIFA eligibility rules; some limited exceptions apply. Players may hold more than one non-FIFA nationality.

No.	Pos.	Nation	Player
1	GK	(Iceland) ISL	Róbert Örn Óskarsson
2	DF	(United States) USA	Sean Michael Reynolds
3	DF	(Iceland) ISL	Guðjón Árni Antoníusson (Captain)
4	DF	(England) ENG	Sam Tillen
5	DF	(Iceland) ISL	Pétur Viðarsson
6	DF	(England) ENG	Sam Hewson
7	MF	(Iceland) ISL	Ingimundur Níels Óskarsson
8	MF	(Iceland) ISL	Emil Pálsson
9	MF	(Iceland) ISL	Hákon Atli Hallfreðsson
10	MF	(Iceland) ISL	Davíð Þór Viðarsson (Third-captain)
11	FW	(Iceland) ISL	Atli Guðnason
12	GK	(Iceland) ISL	Kristján Finnbogason
13	FW	(Iceland) ISL	Kristján Gauti Emilsson (Joined NEC Nijmegen in July)
14	FW	(Iceland) ISL	Albert Brynjar Ingason (Joined Fylkir in July on loan)
14	FW	(Iceland) ISL	Indriði Áki Þorláksson

No.	Pos.	Nation	Player
16	DF	(Iceland) ISL	Jón Ragnar Jónsson
17	FW	(Iceland) ISL	Atli Viðar Björnsson
18	MF	(Iceland) ISL	Einar Karl Ingvarsson (Joined Fjölnir in July on loan)
19	FW	(Scotland) SCO	Steven Lennon
20	DF	(Mali) MLI	Kassim Doumbia
21	DF	(Iceland) ISL	Böðvar Böðvarsson
22	MF	(Iceland) ISL	Ólafur Páll Snorrason (Vice-captain)
23	MF	(Iceland) ISL	Brynjar Ásgeir Guðmundsson
24	DF	(Iceland) ISL	Ási Þórhallsson
25	MF	(Iceland) ISL	Hólmar Örn Rúnarsson
26	DF	(Belgium) BEL	Jonathan Hendrickx
26	DF	(Iceland) ISL	Aron Lloyd Green (Joined Þróttur in May on loan)
28	MF	(Iceland) ISL	Sigurður Gísli Snorrason
—	DF	(Iceland) ISL	Steinar Aron Magnússon

=== Transfers in ===
Date	Position	No.	Player	From club	Ref
17 October 2013	MF	6	(England) Sam Hewson	(Iceland) Fram	
1 November 2013	GK	12	(Iceland) Kristján Finnbogason	(Iceland) Fylkir	
8 January 2014	DF	2	(United States) Sean Michael Reynolds	(United States) VSI Tampa Bay	
8 January 2014	FW	-	(Iceland) Steinar Aron Magnússon	(Iceland) Höttur	
23 April 2014	DF	20	(Mali) Kassim Doumbia	(Belgium) Waasland-Beveren	
8 July 2014	DF	26	(Belgium) Jonathan Hendrickx	(Netherlands) Fortuna Sittard	
25 July 2014	FW	19	(Scotland) Steven Lennon	(Norway) Sandnes Ulf	
29 July 2014	FW	14	(Iceland) Indriði Áki Þorláksson	(Iceland) Valur	

=== Transfers out ===
Date	Position	No.	Player	To club	Ref
9 August 2013	MF	10	(Iceland) Björn Daníel Sverrisson	(Norway) Viking FK	
28 September 2013	DF	5	(Iceland) Freyr Bjarnason	Retired	
1 October 2013	GK	12	(Iceland) Daði Lárusson	Retired	
31 October 2013	DF	15	(Iceland) Guðmann Þórisson	(Sweden) Mjällby AIF	
17 November 2013	MF	26	(Iceland) Viktor Örn Guðmundsson	(Iceland) Fylkir	
19 December 2013	MF	–	(Iceland) Ingimar Elí Hlynsson	(Iceland) ÍA	
24 February 2014	MF	24	(England) Dominic Furness	(Sweden) Ljungskile SK	
23 July 2014	FW	13	(Iceland) Kristján Gauti Emilsson	(Netherlands) NEC Nijmegen	

Björn Daníel signed for Viking FK on 9 August 2013 but he finished the 2013 season with FH before joining.

=== Loans Out ===
Start Date	End Date	Position	No.	Player	To Club	Ref
19 March 2014	29 July 2014	MF	18	(Iceland) Einar Karl Ingvarsson	(Iceland) Fjölnir	
13 May 2014	16 October 2014	DF	26	(Iceland) Aron Lloyd Green	(Iceland) Þróttur	
20 July 2014	16 October 2014	FW	14	(Iceland) Albert Brynjar Ingason	(Iceland) Fylkir	

== Pre-season ==
=== Fótbolti.net Cup ===
FH took part in Fótbolti.net Cup, a pre-season tournament for clubs outside of Reykjavík, in January. The team was drawn in Group 1 in A-deild with 3 other teams; Keflavik, Breiðablik and Grindavík. FH finished top of the group with 2 wins and 1 defeat. They played Stjarnan in the final which they lost 3–1.

Date	Round	Opponents	Stadium	Result F–A	Scorers
10 January 2014	Group stage	Grindavík	Reykjaneshöllin	7–1	Ingimundur Níels 9' Emil Páls 13' 17' Atli Guðna 54' Kristján Gauti 60' 71' 91'
18 January 2014	Group stage	Keflavík	Reykjaneshöllin	1–3	Davíð Þór 64'
25 January 2014	Group stage	Breiðablik	Fífan	3–0	Guðjón Árni 65' Pétur Viðars 85' Ingimundur Níels 92'
28 January 2014	Final	Stjarnan	Kórinn	1–3	Emil Páls 69'

=== Atlantic Cup ===
FH played in The Atlantic Cup, a pre-season friendly tournament held in Algarve, Portugal. The tournament was contested of 8 teams from 6 countries. FH played 3 games against Örebro SK, FC Spartak Moscow and SV Mattersburg and lost all three. FH ended in 8th and last place.

Date	Opponents	Stadium	Result F–A	Scorers
5 February 2014	Örebro SK	Estádio Algarve	1–4	Davíð Þór 44'
9 February 2014	FC Spartak Moscow	Estádio Albufeira	1–3	Atli Guðna 10'
11 February 2014	SV Mattersburg	Estádio da Nora	2–4	Atli Viðar 34' Ingimundur Níels 35'

Pos	Team	Pld	W	D	L	GF	GA	GD	Pts
1	(Denmark) F.C. Copenhagen	3	3	0	0	11	0	+11	9
2	(Sweden) Örebro SK	3	3	0	0	8	2	+6	9
3	(Russia) FC Spartak Moscow	3	2	0	1	5	7	−2	6
4	(Iceland) Breiðablik UBK	3	1	1	1	3	4	−1	5
5	(Austria) SV Mattersburg	3	1	1	1	6	5	+1	4
6	(Czech Republic) FC Slovan Liberec	3	1	0	2	2	7	−5	3
7	(Denmark) FC Midtjylland	3	0	0	3	3	6	−3	0
8	(Iceland) FH Hafnarfjarðar	3	0	0	3	4	11	-7	0

== Lengjubikar ==
Lengjubikarinn, the Icelandic league cup, was held from 14 February to 25 April. It was played in 3 groups and FH were drawn in Group 2 along with 7 other teams. FH came second in the group and went through to the quarter-finals where they won Stjarnan. In the semi-finals they defeated KR on penalties and in the finals they won Breiðablik 4–1, with a hattrick from Ingimundur Níels, thus becoming Lengjubikar champions. This was FH's 6th league cup.

=== Matches ===
Date	Round	Opponents	Stadium	Result F–A	Scorers
16 February 2014	Group stage	KA	Akraneshöllin	3–0	Albert Brynjar 43' Ingimundur Níels 67' Emil Páls 82'
21 February 2014	Group stage	Fylkir	Egilshöll	3–1	Emil Páls 46' Sam Tillen 62' Ingimundur Níels 78'
3 April 2014	Group stage	Fjölnir	Egilshöll	0–3	
16 March 2014	Group stage	Leiknir R	Egilshöll	3–1	Kristján Gauti 20' 53' Ingimundur Níels 23'
21 March 2014	Group stage	HK	Kórinn	10–1	Davíð Þór 6' Kristján Gauti 25' 29' 30' 74' Ingimundur Níels 36' 59' Atli Viðar 51' 77' Atli Guðna 88'
28 March 2014	Group stage	Þróttur R	Gervigrasvöllur Laugardal	1–0	Atli Viðar 5'
11 April 2014	Group stage	Þór	Boginn	0–1	
16 April 2014	Quarter-finals	Stjarnan	Samsung-völlur	2–1	Ingimundur Níels 66' Sam Hewson 69'
21 April 2014	Semi-finals	KR	KR-völlur	1–1(4–2 pen)	Emil Páls 6'
25 April 2014	Final	Breiðablik	Samsung-völlur	4–1	Ingimundur Níels 22' 64' 86' Hólmar Örn 90'

FH played with an ineligible player against Fjölnir, the original result was 3–2.

== Borgunarbikar ==
FH came into the Borgunarbikar, Icelandic cup, in the 3rd round (32nd finals) where they were drawn against KR. FH lost the game 1–0.

=== Matches ===
Date	Round	Opponents	Stadium	Result F–A	Scorers
28 May 2014	32nd-finals	KR	KR-völlur	0–1	

== Úrvalsdeild ==
After a good preseason and winning the Lengjubikar FH came into the season with good confidence. FH started the season with a home game against Breiðablik, ending in a draw 1–1. FH went through the season unbeaten until the last game of the season, where they met Stjarnan in a final for the title. Both team were unbeaten but FH needed just a draw to secure the title. Stjarnan took the lead on 40th minute through a controversial goal. FH came back and equalised on 64th minute through a goal from Steven Lennon. On 59th minute Veigar Páll got sent off for Stjarnan and FH took control of the game but missed some good chances. They were made to pay, in stoppage time Kassim Doumbia fouled Ólafur Karl of Stjarnan inside FH's penalty area and the referee pointed to the spot. Ólafur Karl scored from the penalty spot securing Stjarnan first ever Úrvalsdeild title.

=== Table ===
Pos	Team	Pld	W	D	L	GF	GA	GD	Pts	Qualification or relegation
1	Stjarnan (C)	22	15	7	0	42	21	+21	52	Qualification for the Champions League second qualifying round
2	FH	22	15	6	1	46	17	+29	51	Qualification for the Europa League first qualifying round (Note: The 2014 Icelandic Cup winner, KR, qualifies for 2015–16 UEFA Europa League first qualifying round.)
3	KR	22	13	4	5	40	24	+16	43	Qualification for the Europa League first qualifying round
4	Víkingur Reykjavík	22	9	3	10	25	29	−4	30	Qualification for the Europa League first qualifying round
5	Valur	22	8	4	10	31	36	−5	28	
6	Fylkir	22	8	4	10	34	40	−6	28	
7	Breiðablik	22	5	12	5	36	33	+3	27	
8	Keflavík	22	6	7	9	29	32	−3	25	
9	Fjölnir	22	5	8	9	33	36	−3	23	
10	ÍBV	22	5	7	10	28	38	−10	22	
11	Fram (R)	22	6	3	13	30	48	−18	21	Relegation to 1. deild karla
12	Þór A. (R)	22	3	3	16	24	44	−20	12	Relegation to 1. deild karla

Source: KSÍ
Rules for classification: 1) points; 2) goal difference; 3) number of goals scored.
(C) Champions; (R) Relegated

=== Matches ===
Win Draw Loss Upcoming fixture

5 May 2014 1	FH	1–1	Breiðablik	Hafnarfjörður
19:15 GMT	Hólmar Örn Rúnarsson 35'	Report	Tómas Óli Garðarsson 3'	Stadium: Kaplakrikavöllur; Attendance: 1869; Referee: Kristinn Jakobsson

8 May 2014 2	FH	3–0	Fylkir	Hafnarfjörður
19:15 GMT	Atli Guðnason 17'; Kristján Gauti Emilsson 46'; Kassim Doumbia 78'	Report		Stadium: Kaplakrikavöllur; Attendance: 1136; Referee: Erlendur Eiríksson

12 May 2014 3	KR	0–1	FH	Reykjavík
20:30 GMT		Report	Kristján Gauti Emilsson 39'	Stadium: Gervigrasvöllur Laugardal; Attendance: 2055; Referee: Garðar Örn Hinriksson

18 May 2014 4	FH	1–0	ÍBV	Hafnarfjörður
17:00 GMT	Atli Viðar Björnsson 90+5'	Report		Stadium: Kaplakrikavöllur; Attendance: 1408; Referee: Þóroddur Hjaltalín

22 May 2014 5	Keflavík	1–1	FH	Keflavík
20:00 GMT	Elías Már Ómarsson 3'	Report	Atli Viðar Björnsson 83'	Stadium: Nettóvöllurinn; Attendance: 1150; Referee: Vilhjálmur Alvar Þórarinsson

1 June 2014 6	FH	1–0	Víkingur R	Hafnarfjörður
19:15 GMT	Atli Viðar Björnsson 74'	Report		Stadium: Kaplakrikavöllur; Attendance: 1167; Referee: Örvar Sær Gíslason

11 June 2014 7	Fjölnir	0–1	FH	Reykjavík
19:15 GMT		Report	Atli Guðnason 17'	Stadium: Fjölnisvöllur; Attendance: 784; Referee: Erlendur Eiríksson

15 June 2014 8	FH	1–1	Þór	Hafnarfjörður
17:00 GMT	Kristján Gauti Emilsson 13'	Report	Jóhann Helgi Hannesson 56'	Stadium: Kaplakrikavöllur; Attendance: 644; Referee: Valgeir Valgeirsson

23 June 2014 9	Fram	0–4	FH	Reykjavík
19:00 GMT		Report	Kristján Gauti Emilsson 7' 48'; Atli Viðar Björnsson 58'; Own Goal 87'	Stadium: Laugardalsvöllur; Attendance: 567; Referee: Þóroddur Hjaltalín

27 June 2014 10	FH	2–1	Valur	Hafnarfjörður
19:15 GMT	Atli Guðnason 22' 90+2 (pen)'	Report	Own Goal 58'	Stadium: Kaplakrikavöllur; Attendance: 1476; Referee: Kristinn Jakobsson

13 July 2014 11	Stjarnan	2–2	FH	Garðabær
16:00 GMT	Arnar Már Björgvinsson 34'; Veigar Páll Gunnarsson 82'	Report	Atli Viðar Björnsson 23'; Own Goal 67'	Stadium: Samsungvöllur; Attendance: 1213; Referee: Garðar Örn Hinriksson

21 July 2014 12	Breiðablik	2–4	FH	Kópavogur
19:15 GMT	Árni Vilhjálmsson 11'; Arnór Sveinn Aðalsteinsson 44'	Report	Ingimundur Níels Óskarsson 10'; Atli Viðar Björnsson 31'; Kassim Doumbia 39'; Jón Ragnar Jónsson 90'	Stadium: Kópavogsvöllur; Attendance: 1240; Referee: Þorvaldur Árnason

27 July 2014 13	Fylkir	0–2	FH	Reykjavík
19:15 GMT		Report	Ingimundur Níels Óskarsson 79'; Emil Pálsson 86'	Stadium: Lautin; Attendance: 987; Referee: Örvar Sær Gíslason

18 September 2014 14	FH	1–1	KR	Hafnarfjörður
17:00 GMT	Atli Guðnason 65'	Report	Gary Martin 83'	Stadium: Kaplakrikavöllur; Attendance: 1934; Referee: Þóroddur Hjaltalín

10 August 2014 15	ÍBV	1–1	FH	Vestmannaeyjar
17:00 GMT	Jonathan Ricardo Glenn 41'	Report	Steven Lennon 33'	Stadium: Hásteinsvöllur; Attendance: 403; Referee: Garðar Örn Hinriksson

20 August 2014 16	FH	2–0	Keflavík	Hafnarfjörður
18:00 GMT	Own Goal 15'; Steven Lennon 63'	Report		Stadium: Kaplakrikavöllur; Attendance: 1393; Referee: Þóroddur Hjaltalín

25 August 2014 17	Víkingur R	2–3	FH	Reykjavík
18:00 GMT	Michael Maynard Abnett 49'; Stefán Bjarni Hjaltested 90+3'	Report	Ingimundur Níels Óskarsson 50'; Atli Viðar Björnsson 85'; Own Goal 88'	Stadium: Víkingsvöllur; Attendance: 785; Referee: Þorvaldur Árnason

31 August 2014 18	FH	4–0	Fjölnir	Hafnarfjörður
18:00 GMT	Ingimundur Níels Óskarsson 55'; Atli Guðnason 61'; Steven Lennon 64' 74'	Report		Stadium: Kaplakrikavöllur; Attendance: 937; Referee: Gunnar Jarl Jónsson

14 September 2014 19	Þór	0–2	FH	Akureyri
17:00 GMT		Report	Kassim Doumbia 61' 64'	Stadium: Þórsvöllur; Attendance: 503; Referee: Garðar Örn Hinriksson

21 September 2014 20	FH	4–2	Fram	Hafnarfjörður
16:00 GMT	Atli Guðnason 3'; Emil Pálsson 14'; Sam Hewson 60'; Atli Viðar Björnsson 86'	Report	Orri Gunnarsson 57'; Aron Bjarnason 73'	Stadium: Kaplakrikavöllur; Attendance: 734; Referee: Vilhjálmur Alvar Þórarinsson

28 September 2014 21	Valur	1–4	FH	Reykjavík
14:00 GMT	Magnús Már Lúðvíksson 16'	Report	Atli Guðnason 17' 47' 70'; Steven Lennon 54'	Stadium: Vodafonevöllurinn; Attendance: 1071; Referee: Garðar Örn Hinriksson

4 October 2014 22	FH	1–2	Stjarnan	Hafnarfjörður
16:00 GMT	Steven Lennon 64'	Report	Ólafur Karl Finsen 40' 90+2 (pen)'	Stadium: Kaplakrikavöllur; Attendance: 6450; Referee: Kristinn Jakobsson

=== Results ===
Overall								Home						Away					
Pld	W	D	L	GF	GA	GD	Pts	W	D	L	GF	GA	GD	W	D	L	GF	GA	GD
22	15	6	1	46	17	+29	51	7	3	1	21	8	+13	8	3	0	25	9	+16

Last updated: 30 October 2014.
Source: KSÍ

=== Points breakdown ===
- Points at home: 24
- Points away from home: 27
- 6 Points: Valur, Fylkir, Víkingur R, Fjölnir, Fram
- 4 Points: Breiðablik, Keflavík, Þór, KR, ÍBV
- 1 Points: Stjarnan

== Europa League ==
FH played in the Europa League qualification from 3 July to 7 August, they came into the tournament in the 1st round. They were drawn against the N.Ireland team Glenavon and they won the tie 6–2, 3–0 in the first leg at home and 3–2 in the second leg. In the 2nd round FH were drawn against Neman Grodno from Belarus. The tie ended 3–1 for FH, 1–1 away and 2–0 at home. FH then got eliminated in the 3rd round against the Swedish team Elfsborg 5–3, 2–1 at home and 1–4 away.

These 6 games took FH's total appearances in Europe to a total of 29. Atli Guðnason scored 4 goals in these games and he now has 10 goals in European cup games.

=== Matches ===
Date	Round	Leg	Opponents	Stadium	Result F–A	Scorers
3 July 2014	Round 1	Home	Glenavon	Kaplakrikavöllur	3–0	Ingimundur Níels 82' Atli Guðna 90' 93'
10 July 2014	Round 1	Away	Glenavon	Mourneview Park	3–2	Ingimundur Níels 3' Emil Páls 37' 69'(pen)
17 July 2014	Round 2	Away	Neman Grodno	Neman Stadium	1–1	Kristján Gauti 55'
24 July 2014	Round 2	Home	Neman Grodno	Kaplakrikavöllur	2–0	Atli Guðna 42' Atli Viðar 80'
31 July 2014	Round 3	Away	IF Elfsborg	Borås Arena	1–4	Steven Lennon 61'
7 August 2014	Round 3	Home	IF Elfsborg	Kaplakrikavöllur	2–1	Atli Guðna 17' Kassim Doumbia 76'

== Statistics ==
=== Appearances ===
Includes all competitive matches; Úrvalsdeild, Borgunarbikar, Lengjubikar and Europa League.

Numbers in parentheses are sub appearances.

No.	Pos.	Nation	Name	Úrvalsdeild	Icelandic Cup	League Cup	Europa League	Total
1	GK	(Iceland)	Róbert Örn Óskarsson	22	1	8	6	37
2	DF	(United States)	Sean Reynolds	7 (3)	1	5 (3)	1 (1)	21
3	DF	(Iceland)	Guðjón Árni Antoníusson	3 (3)	0	2 (3)	0	11
4	DF	(England)	Sam Tillen	0	0	4	0	4
5	DF	(Iceland)	Pétur Viðarsson	20	0	8	5	33
6	MF	(England)	Sam Hewson	12 (8)	1	7 (2)	4 (1)	35
7	MF	(Iceland)	Ingimundur Níels Óskarsson	14 (6)	1	8 (2)	1 (4)	36
8	MF	(Iceland)	Emil Pálsson	12 (9)	1	6 (2)	4 (2)	36
10	MF	(Iceland)	Davíð Þór Viðarsson	18 (2)	1	9	5	35
11	FW	(Iceland)	Atli Guðnason	18 (4)	(1)	4 (6)	5 (1)	39
12	GK	(Iceland)	Kristján Finnbogason	0	0	2 (1)	0	3
13	FW	(Iceland)	Kristján Gauti Emilsson	7 (2)	0	3 (2)	3	17
14	FW	(Iceland)	Albert Brynjar Ingason	2 (3)	1	4 (2)	(1)	13
16	DF	(Iceland)	Jón Ragnar Jónsson	18 (2)	1	10	6	37
17	FW	(Iceland)	Atli Viðar Björnsson	8 (10)	(1)	5 (3)	1 (1)	29
18	MF	(Iceland)	Einar Karl Ingvarsson	0	0	(1)	0	1
19	FW	(Scotland)	Steven Lennon	9 (1)	0	0	2	12
20	DF	(Mali)	Kassim Doumbia	18	0	0	6	24
21	DF	(Iceland)	Böðvar Böðvarsson	10 (1)	1	4 (3)	3	22
22	MF	(Iceland)	Ólafur Páll Snorrason	17 (3)	1	9	6	36
23	DF	(Iceland)	Brynjar Ásgeir Guðmundsson	2 (2)	0	0	(1)	5
24	DF	(Iceland)	Ási Þórhallsson	0	0	(1)	0	1
25	MF	(Iceland)	Hólmar Örn Rúnarsson	14 (6)	1	10	5 (1)	37
26	DF	(Belgium)	Jonathan Hendrickx	11	0	0	3	14
26	DF	(Iceland)	Aron Lloyd Green	0	0	2 (3)	0	5
28	MF	(Iceland)	Sigurður Gísli Snorrason	0	0	(4)	0	4
–	MF	(Iceland)	Steinar Aron Magnússon	0	0	(1)	0	1

=== Squad Stats ===
Includes all competitive matches; Úrvalsdeild, Borgunarbikar, Lengjubikar and Europa League.

	Úrvalsdeild	Borgunarbikar	Lengjubikar	Europa League	Total
Games played	22	1	10	6	39
Games won	15	0	8	4	27
Games drawn	6	0	0	1	7
Games lost	1	1	2	1	5
Goals scored	46	0	30	12	88
Goals conceded	17	1	10	8	36
Clean sheets	10	0	2	2	14
Yellow cards	34	4	15	9	62
Red cards	4	1	2	1	8

Last updated: 31 October
Source: KSÍ

=== Goal scorers ===
Includes all competitive matches; Úrvalsdeild, Borgunarbikar, Lengjubikar and Europa League.

No.	Pos.	Nation	Name	Úrvalsdeild	Borgunarbikar	Lengjubikar	Europa League	Total
7	MF	(Iceland)	Ingimundur Níels Óskarsson	4	0	9	2	15
11	FW	(Iceland)	Atli Guðnason	10	0	1	4	15
13	FW	(Iceland)	Kristján Gauti Emilsson	5	0	7	3	15
17	FW	(Iceland)	Atli Viðar Björnsson	8	0	3	1	12
8	MF	(Iceland)	Emil Pálsson	2	0	5	0	7
19	FW	(Scotland)	Steven Lennon	6	0	0	1	7
20	DF	(Mali)	Kassim Doumbia	4	0	0	1	5
6	MF	(England)	Sam Hewson	1	0	1	0	2
25	MF	(Iceland)	Hólmar Örn Rúnarsson	1	0	1	0	2
2	DF	(England)	Sam Tillen	0	0	1	0	1
10	MF	(Iceland)	Davíð Þór Viðarsson	0	0	1	0	1
14	FW	(Iceland)	Albert Brynjar Ingason	0	0	1	0	1
16	DF	(Iceland)	Jón Ragnar Jónsson	1	0	0	0	1
Own Goals				4	0	0	0	4
TOTAL				46	0	30	12	88

Last updated: 31 October
Source: KSÍ

=== Disciplinary record ===
Includes all competitive matches; Úrvalsdeild, Borgunarbikar, Lengjubikar and Europa League.

N	P	Nat.	Name	Úrvalsdeild			Borgunarbikar			Lengjubikar			Europa League			Total			Notes
N	P	Nat.	Name	Yellow card	Second yellow card	Red card	Yellow card	Second yellow card	Red card	Yellow card	Second yellow card	Red card	Yellow card	Second yellow card	Red card	Yellow card	Second yellow card	Red card	Notes
2	DF	(United States)	Sean Reynolds							2						2			
3	DF	(Iceland)	Guðjón Árni Antoníusson	1								1				1		1	
5	DF	(Iceland)	Pétur Viðarsson	4	2					1						5	2		
6	MF	(England)	Sam Hewson	3						2		1				5		1	
7	MF	(Iceland)	Ingimundur Níels Óskarsson	2												2			
8	MF	(Iceland)	Emil Pálsson	2			1						1			4			
10	MF	(Iceland)	Davíð Þór Viðarsson	5			1			3			3			12			
11	FW	(Iceland)	Atli Guðnason	3												3			
13	FW	(Iceland)	Kristján Gauti Emilsson	1												1			
16	DF	(Iceland)	Jón Ragnar Jónsson	4					1	1			2			7		1	
17	FW	(Iceland)	Atli Viðar Björnsson	1			1									2			
19	FW	(Scotland)	Steven Lennon	1												1			
20	DF	(Mali)	Kassim Doumbia	5	2								1			6	2		
21	DF	(Iceland)	Böðvar Böðvarsson	1			1			1			1			4			
22	MF	(Iceland)	Ólafur Páll Snorrason							4			1			5			
25	MF	(Iceland)	Hólmar Örn Rúnarsson	4						1			1			6			
26	DF	(Belgium)	Jonathan Hendrickx	1									1		1	2		1	

Last updated: 31 October 2014
Source: KSÍ
Ordered by (red card) , (second yellow card) and (yellow card)
(yellow card) = Number of bookings; (second yellow card) = Number of sending offs after a second yellow card; (red card) = Number of sending offs by a direct red card.
