= List of foreign Besta deild karla players =

This is a list of foreign players in the men's top-tier football league in Iceland, currently named the Besta deild karla, which commenced play in 1912. The following players must meet both of the following two criteria:

1. Have played at least one Besta deild game. Players who were signed by Besta deild clubs, but only played in lower league, cup and/or European games, or did not play in any competitive games at all, are not included.
2. Are considered foreign, determined by the following:

A player is considered foreign if he is not eligible to play for Iceland national football team, more specifically:
- If a player has been capped on international level, the national team is used; if he has been capped by more than one country, the highest level (or the most recent) team is used.
- If a player has not been capped on international level, his country of birth is used, except those who were born abroad from Icelandic parents or moved to Iceland at a young age, and those who clearly indicated to have switched his nationality to another nation.

== Australia ==
- Dylan Macallister – Breiðablik – 2011

== Belgium ==
- Jérémy Serwy – FH – 2015–2016
- Jonathan Hendrickx – FH, Breiðablik – 2014–2017, 2018
- Muhammed Mert – Víkingur R. – 2017
- Danny Schreurs – Leiknir R. – 2015

== Bosnia-Herzegovina (Bosnia and Herzegovina) ==
- Kristijan Jajalo – Grindavík – 2017–
- Emir Dokara – Vikingur Ólafsvík – 2013, 2016–2017
- Kenan Turudija – Vikingur Ólafsvík – 2016–2017
- Izzy Tandir – Breiðablik – 2015
- Eldar Masic – Vikingur Ólafsvík – 2013
- Edin Beslija – Þór Akureyri – 2013
- Amir Mehica – Haukar – 2010

== Brazil ==
- Daniel Bamberg – Breiðablik – 2016
- Thiago Pinto Borges – Þróttur R. – 2016

== Bulgaria ==
- Iliyan Garov – Víkingur R. – 2014
- Ventsislav Ivanov – Víkingur R. – 2014
- Todor Hristov – Víkingur R. – 2014

== Cameroon ==
- Charley Roussel Fomen – Leiknir R. – 2015

== DR Congo (Democratic Republic of the Congo) ==
- Michee Efete – Breiðablik – 2017

== Croatia ==
- Mario Tadejević – Fjölnir – 2016–
- Igor Jugović – Fjölnir – 2016–
- Marko Perković – Víkingur R. – 2016
- Josip Fuček – Víkingur R. – 2016
- Matija Dvorneković – FH – 2017
- Hrvoje Tokić – Vikingur Ólafsvík, Breiðablik – 2016–
- Vedran Turkalj – KA – 2017
- Ivica Džolan – Fjölnir – 2017
- Tonči Radovniković – Fylkir – 2015–2016
- Mario Brlečić – ÍBV – 2015
- Zoran Stamenić – Grindavík – 2008–2009
- Marinko Skaričić – Grindavík, Fjölnir – 2008–2009
- Žankarlo Šimunić – Grindavík – 2008

== Curaçao ==
- Prince Rajcomar – Breiðablik, KR – 2007–2009

== Czech Republic ==
- Michal Pospíšil – Grindavík – 2011

== Denmark ==
- Jeppe Hansen – Stjarnan, KR, Keflavík – 2014–2016, 2018
- Denis Fazlagic – KR – 2016
- Kennie Chopart – Stjarnan, Fjölnir, KR – 2012–2013, 2015–
- Michael Præst – Stjarnan, KR – 2012–2013, 2015–
- Morten Beck Andersen – KR – 2016–2017
- Morten Beck – KR – 2016–
- Martin Lund Pedersen – Fjölnir, Breiðablik – 2016–2017
- Tobias Salquist – Fjölnir – 2016
- Marcus Solberg – Fjölnir – 2016–2017
- Rasmus Christiansen – ÍBV, KR, Valur – 2010–2012, 2015–
- Rolf Toft – Stjarnan, Víkingur R., Valur – 2014–2016
- Andreas Albech – Valur – 2016
- Kristian Gaarde – Valur – 2016
- Nikolaj Hansen – Valur, Víkingur R. – 2016–
- Martin Svensson – Vikingur Reykjavik, Vikingur Ólafsvík – 2016
- Søren Andreasen – ÍBV – 2016
- Simon Smidt – ÍBV, Grindavík – 2016–2017
- Mikkel Maigaard – ÍBV – 2016–2017
- Nicolas Bøgild – Valur – 2017
- Patrick Pedersen – Valur – 2013–2015, 2017–
- Nicolaj Køhlert – Valur – 2017
- Tobias Thomsen – KR, Valur – 2017–
- André Bjerregaard – KR – 2017–
- Emil Lyng – KA – 2017
- Sebastian Svärd – Þróttur R. – 2016
- Christian Sørensen – Þróttur R. – 2016
- Søren Frederiksen – KR – 2015
- Thomas Guldborg Christensen – Valur – 2015
- Jacob Schoop – KR – 2015
- Mathias Schlie – Valur – 2015
- Kristian Larsen – Þróttur R. – 2016
- Niclas Vemmelund – Stjarnan – 2014
- Martin Rauschenberg – Stjarnan – 2013–2014
- Sead Gavranovic – ÍBV – 2015
- Thomas Nielsen – Víkingur R. – 2015
- Mads Nielsen – Valur – 2014
- Nichlas Rohde – Breiðablik – 2012–2013
- Mark Tubæk – Þór Akureyri – 2013
- Thomas Sørensen – ÍA – 2013
- Christian Olsen – ÍBV – 2012
- Mads Laudrup – Stjarnan – 2012
- Alexander Scholz – Stjarnan – 2012
- Jesper Jensen – Stjarnan, ÍA – 2011–2012
- Tommy Nielsen – FH – 2003–2011
- Nikolaj Hagelskjær – Stjarnan – 2011
- Jacob Neestrup – FH – 2010
- Martin Pedersen – Valur – 2010
- Danni König – Valur – 2010
- Lasse Jörgensen – Keflavík – 2009–2010
- Nicolai Jörgensen – Keflavík – 2007–2009
- Dennis Danry – Þróttur R., Stjarnan – 2008–2010
- Morten Smidt – Þróttur R. – 2009
- Dennis Siim – FH – 2005–2009
- Henrik Forsberg Bödker – Þróttur R. – 2009
- Rasmus Hansen – Valur – 2008
- Henrik Eggerts – Fram, Valur – 2007–2008
- Hans Mathiesen – Fram, Keflavík – 2005, 2007–2008
- René Carlsen – Valur – 2007–2008
- Casper Jacobsen – Breiðablik – 2007–2008
- Allan Dyring – FH, Fylkir – 2006–2008
- Peter Gravesen – Fylkir – 2006–2008
- Allan Borgvardt – FH – 2003–2005

== El Salvador ==
- Pablo Punyed – Fylkir, Stjarnan, ÍBV, KR – 2013–
- Derby Carrillo – ÍBV – 2016–

== England ==
- Gary Martin – ÍA, KR, Víkingur Reykjavík – 2010–2017
- Sam Hewson – Fram, FH, Grindavík – 2011–
- Darren Lough – ÍA – 2015–2016
- Charles Vernam – ÍBV – 2016
- Ian Jeffs – ÍBV, Fylkir, Valur – 2003–2005, 2008–2016
- Jonathan Barden – ÍBV – 2015–2016
- Archange Nkumu – KA – 2017–
- Callum Williams – KA – 2017–
- David Atkinson – ÍBV – 2017
- Matt Garner – ÍBV – 2004, 2006, 2009–2014, 2017
- Rashid Yussuff – ÍA – 2017
- Callum Brittain – Þróttur R. – 2016
- Kabongo Tshimanga – Þróttur R. – 2016
- Dean Morgan – Þróttur R. – 2016
- Lewis Ward – Fylkir – 2016
- Sam Tillen – Fram, FH – 2008–2013, 2015
- Paul Bignot – Keflavík – 2015
- James Hurst – ÍBV, Valur – 2010, 2013–2014
- Michael Abnett – Víkingur Reykjavík – 2014
- Dean Martin – ÍA, KA, ÍBV – 1998, 2002–2007, 2012–2014
- Danny Racchi – Valur – 2013
- Dominic Furness – FH – 2013
- David James – ÍBV – 2013
- David Preece – Keflavík – 2013
- Theodore Eugene Furness – ÍA – 2012–2013
- Bradley Simmonds – ÍBV – 2013
- Aaron Spear – ÍBV – 2011–2013
- Danny Thomas – FH – 2012
- Jake Gallagher – ÍBV – 2012
- George Baldock – ÍBV – 2012
- Ben Everson – Breiðablik – 2012
- Mark Doninger – ÍA, Stjarnan – 2012
- Joe Tillen – Fram, Valur, Selfoss – 2008–2010, 2012
- Tomi Ameobi – Grindavík – 2012
- Jordan Edridge – Grindavík – 2012
- Bryan Hughes – ÍBV – 2011
- Kelvin Mellor – ÍBV – 2011
- Jordan Connerton – ÍBV – 2011
- Mark Redshaw – Fram – 2011
- Clark Keltie – Þór Akureyri – 2011
- Jack Giddens – Grindavík – 2011
- Cameron Gayle – Víkingur R. – 2011
- Kemar Roofe – Víkingur R. – 2011
- Sam Mantom – Haukar – 2010
- A-Jay Leitch-Smith – ÍBV – 2009
- Chris Clements – ÍBV – 2009
- Ben Ryan Long – Grindavík – 2009
- Sam Malsom – Þróttur R. – 2009
- Stewart Beards – Valur – 1995

== Faroe Islands ==
- Hallur Hansson – KR– 2022
- Patrik Johannesen – Keflavík – 2022
- Gunnar Nielsen – Stjarnan, FH – 2015–
- Kaj Leo í Bartalsstovu – FH, ÍBV, Valur, ÍA – 2016–
- Sonni Nattestad – FH, Fylkir – 2016
- René Joensen – Grindavík – 2017–
- Jónas Tór Næs – Valur, ÍBV – 2011–2013, 2017
- Pól Jóhannus Justinussen – Valur – 2011
- Christian Mouritsen – Valur – 2011
- Símun Samuelsen – Keflavík – 2005–2009
- Uni Arge – Leiftur, ÍA – 1998–2000
- Fróði Benjaminsen – Fram – 2004
- Hans Fróði Hansen – Fram – 2004
- Jens Martin Knudsen – Leiftur – 1998–2000

== Finland ==
- Jan Berg – ÍA – 2013
- Denis Abdulahi – Víkingur R. – 2011

== France ==
- Cédric D'Ulivo – FH – 2017–
- Yacine Si Salem – Grindavík – 2011
- Sylvain Soumare – Grindavík – 2009

== Gabon ==
- Loic Ondo – Grindavík – 2010, 2012
- Gilles Mbang Ondo – Grindavík – 2008–2010

== Gambia (The Gambia) ==
- Matarr Jobe – Valur – 2012–2014

== Ghana ==
- Eric Kwakwa – Vikingur Ólafsvík – 2017

== Guam ==
- Shawn Nicklaw – Þór Akureyri – 2014

== Hungary ==
- Sandor Matus – KA, Þór Akureyri – 2004, 2014
- Dávid Disztl – Þór Akureyri – 2011

== Iran ==
- Shahab Zahedi – ÍBV – 2017–2018

== Ireland (Republic of Ireland) ==
- David Elebert – Fylkir – 2012
- Diarmuid O'Carroll – Valur – 2010
- Ross McLynn - Fram - 2005
- Brian O'Callaghan - Keflavík - 2005
- Richard Keogh - Víkingur R. - 2004
- Charles McCormick - Throttur - 2003

== Italy ==
- Giuseppe Funicello – Þór Akureyri – 2013

== Ivory Coast ==
- Jean Stéphane Yao Yao – Selfoss – 2010

== Jamaica ==
- Duwayne Kerr – Stjarnan – 2016

== Kosovo ==
- Avni Pepa – ÍBV – 2015–2017
- Benis Krasniqi – Keflavík – 2013

== Latvia ==
- Kaspars Ikstens – Vikingur Ólafsvík – 2013
- Maksims Rafaļskis – ÍA – 2013

== Lithuania ==
- Eivinas Zagurskas – Vikingur Ólafsvík – 2017
- Gabrielius Zagurskas – Vikingur Ólafsvík – 2017
- Arsenij Buinickij – ÍA – 2015

== Macedonia (North Macedonia) ==
- Daniel Ivanovski – Fjölnir – 2015–2016
- Goran Jovanovski – Grindavík – 2011
- Gjorgi Manevski – Grindavík – 2010
- Fikret Alomerović – Valur – 2001

== Malaysia ==
- Kiko Insa – Vikingur Ólafsvík, Keflavík – 2013, 2015

== Mali ==
- Kassim Doumbia – FH – 2014–2017

== Montenegro ==
- Darko Bulatović – KA – 2017

== Netherlands ==
- Mees Siers – ÍBV, Fjölnir – 2015–2017
- Geoffrey Castillion – Víkingur R., FH, Fylkir 2017–2019
- Richard Arends – Keflavík – 2015
- Renee Troost – Breiðablik – 2012–2013
- Mark Rutgers – KR, Víkingur R. – 2009–2011

== New Zealand ==
- Che Bunce – Breiðablik – 1999, 2001

== Nicaragua ==
- Renato Punyed – ÍBV – 2017

== Northern Ireland ==
- Brian McLean – ÍBV – 2017
- Albert Watson - KR - 2018

== Norway ==
- Martin Hummervoll – Keflavík, ÍA – 2015–2016
- Robert Sandnes – Selfoss, Stjarnan, KR – 2012–2013, 2017
- Fredrik Michalsen – Fjölnir – 2017
- Ivar Furu – KR – 2014
- Tom Skogsrud – ÍBV – 2015
- Endre Ove Brenne – Selfoss, Keflavík – 2012–2014
- Jonas Grønner – KR – 2013
- Steffen Haugland – Fram – 2013
- Jon André Røyrane – Selfoss, Fram – 2012–2013
- Petar Rnkovic – Breiðablik – 2012
- Bernard Brons – Selfoss – 2012
- Ivar Skjerve – Selfoss – 2012
- Markus Hermo – Selfoss – 2012
- Torger Motland – FH – 2010
- Lars Ivar Moldskred – KR – 2010
- Alexander Søderlund – FH – 2009
- André Hansen – KR – 2009
- Tor Erik Moen – Grindavík – 2009

== Philippines ==
- Ray Anthony Jónsson – Grindavík, Keflavík – 1999–2006, 2008–2014

== Poland ==
- Tomasz Jaworek – Víkingur – 1993
- Tomasz Łuba – Vikingur Ólafsvík – 2013, 2016–2017
- Maciej Majewski – Grindavík – 2017
- Maciej Makuszewski – Leiknir – 2022
- Robert Menzel – ÍA – 2017
- Patryk Stefański – ÍA – 2017
- Tomasz Stolpa – Grindavík – 2008
- Marcel Zapytowski – ÍBV – 2025–

== Portugal ==
- Ismael Silva Francisco – Þróttur R. – 2008

== São Tomé and Príncipe ==
- Jordão Diogo – KR – 2008–2011

== Romania ==
- Constantin Stănici – Valur – 2000–2001

== Scotland ==
- Alan Lowing – Fram, Víkingur R. – 2011–
- Steven Lennon – Fram, FH – 2011–
- Iain Williamson – Grindavík, Valur, ÍA, Víkingur R. – 2012–2016
- Robbie Crawford – FH – 2017–
- Jordan Halsman – Fram, Breiðablik – 2013–2014
- Harry Monaghan – Víkingur R. – 2014
- Ian Paul McShane – Grindavík, Fram, Keflavík – 1998–2006, 2008–2012, 2014
- Josh Watt – ÍA – 2013
- Gavin Morrison – Grindavík – 2012
- Scott Mckenna Ramsay – Grindavík, Keflavík – 1998–2002, 2004, 2008–2012
- Derek Young – Grindavík – 2011
- Jamie McCunnie – Haukar, Grindavík – 2010–2011
- Robbie Winters – Grindavík – 2011
- Colin Marshall – Víkingur R. – 2011
- Greg Ross – Valur – 2010
- Barry Smith – Valur – 2006–2008
- David Hannah – Grindavík, Fylkir – 2006–2008
- Jim Bett – Valur, KR – 1978, 1994

== Senegal ==
- Amath Diedhiou – Leiknir R. – 2015
- Abdoulaye Ndiaye – Selfoss – 2012
- Babacar Sarr – Selfoss – 2012
- Moustapha Cissé – Selfoss – 2012

== Serbia ==
- Vladimir Tufegdžić – Víkingur R. – 2015–
- Igor Tasković – Víkingur R., Fjölnir – 2014–2017
- Miloš Žeravica – Grindavík – 2017
- Dino Dolmagić – Breiðablik – 2017
- Aleksandar Trninić – KA – 2017–
- Miloš Ožegović – Víkingur R. – 2017–
- Ivica Jovanović – Víkingur R. – 2017
- Srđan Rajković – Þór Akureyri, KA – 2011, 2013, 2017
- Marko Anđelković – ÍA – 2015
- Miloš Živković – Víkingur R. – 2015
- Marjan Jugović – Keflavík – 2013
- Aleksandar Linta – ÍA, Þór Akureyri – 1997, 2011
- Miloš Milojević – Víkingur R. – 2011
- Srđan Gašić – Breiðablik – 2006–2008
- Nenad Živanović – Breiðablik – 2006–2008
- Nenad Petrović – Breiðablik – 2007–2008
- Dušan Ivković – Þróttur R. – 2009
- Miloš Tanasić – Keflavík, Þróttur R. – 2007, 2009

== Sierra Leone ==
- Kwame Quee – Vikingur Ólafsvík – 2017

== Slovenia ==
- Denis Kramar – Vikingur Ólafsvík – 2016
- Marko Pridigar – Fylkir – 2016
- Janez Vrenko – Þór Akureyri – 2011, 2013–2014
- Fuad Gazibegović – Keflavík – 2013
- Jernej Leskovar – Vikingur Ólafsvík – 2013
- Denis Selimović – Keflavík – 2012
- Gregor Mohar – Keflavík – 2012
- Alen Sutej – Keflavík – 2009–2010
- Aljoša Gluhovič – Grindavík – 2008

== South Africa ==
- Danien Justin Warlem – ÍBV – 2010

== Spain ==
- Juan Manuel Ortiz Jiménez – Grindavík – 2017–
- Rodrigo Gomes Mateo – Grindavík – 2017–
- Francisco Eduardo Cruz Lemaur – Grindavík – 2017–
- Álvaro Montejo – Fylkir, ÍBV – 2016–2017
- Alexis Egea – Vikingur Ólafsvík – 2016–2017
- Alonso Sanchez Gonzalez – Vikingur Ólafsvík – 2017
- Cristian Martinez Liberato – Vikingur Ólafsvík, KA – 2016–
- Ignacio Heras Anglada – Vikingur Ólafsvík – 2017
- William Dominguez Da Silva – Vikingur Ólafsvík – 2016
- Sito Seoane – ÍBV, Fykir – 2015–2016
- Jonatan Neftalí – Fjölnir – 2015
- Samuel Jimenez Hernandez – Vikingur Ólafsvík – 2013, 2015
- Toni Espinosa – Vikingur Ólafsvík – 2013
- Juanma Torres – Vikingur Ólafsvík – 2013
- Sergio Lloves – Vikingur Ólafsvík – 2013
- Jorge Corella Garcia – ÍA – 2013
- Hector Pena – ÍA – 2013
- Alexandre Garcia Canedo – Haukar – 2010

== Sweden ==
- Johannes Vall – Valur, ÍA – 2021, 2022
- Viktor Adebahr – ÍBV – 2017
- Linus Olsson – Fjölnir – 2017
- Mirza Mujčić – Vikingur Ólafsvík – 2017
- Pontus Nordenberg – Vikingur Ólafsvík – 2016
- Billy Berntsson – Valur – 2014
- Lucas Ohlander – Valur – 2013–2014
- Sadmir Zekovic – Fylkir – 2014
- Jonas Sandqvist – Keflavík – 2014
- Isak Nylén – ÍBV – 2014
- Emil Berger – Fylkir, Leiknir Reykjavík – 2013, 2021–2022
- Joakim Wrele – ÍA – 2013
- Mikael Eklund – Grindavík – 2012
- Ismet Duracak – Selfoss – 2012
- Adam Larsson – Keflavík – 2011
- Martin Dohlsten – Selfoss – 2010
- Patrik Redo – Fram, Keflavík – 2007–2008
- Kenneth Gustafsson – Keflavík – 2005–2008
- Eric Gustavsson – Fylkir– 2005

== Switzerland ==
- Guy Eschmann – Fylkir – 2013

== Togo ==
- Farid Zato-Arouna – Vikingur Ólafsvík, KR, Keflavík – 2013– 2017

== Trinidad and Tobago ==
- Jonathan Glenn – ÍBV, Breiðablik, Fylkir – 2014–2016, 2018
- Dominic Adams – ÍBV – 2014–2015

== Uganda ==
- Tony Mawejje – ÍBV, Valur, Þróttur R. – 2009–2014, 2016
- Abel Dhaira – ÍBV – 2011–2012, 2014–2015
- Aziz Kemba – ÍBV – 2013
- Andrew Mwesigwa – ÍBV – 2006, 2009
- Augustine Nsumba – ÍBV – 2009

== Ukraine ==
- Denis Sytnik – ÍBV – 2010–2011

== United States of America ==
- Dion Acoff – Þróttur R., Valur – 2016–
- William Daniels – Grindavík – 2017–
- Mark Magee – Fjölnir – 2014–2015
- Chukwudi Chijindu – Þór Akureyri, Keflavík – 2013–2015
- Sean Reynolds – FH – 2014
- Ryan Maduro – Fylkir – 2014
- Andrew Sousa – Fylkir – 2014
- Matthew Ratajczak – Fjölnir – 2014
- Chris Tsonis – Fjölnir – 2014
- Josh Wicks – Þór Akureyri – 2013
- Evan Schwartz – Breiðablik – 2009

== Uruguay ==
- Gonzalo Balbi – KR – 2014–2015

== Wales ==
- Rhys Weston – KR – 2012
- Richard Hurlin – Stjarnan – 2009

== Sources ==
- ksi.is
