= 2015 Ungmennafélagið Fjölnir season =

Fjölnir
2015 season
- Manager: Ágúst Gylfason
- Stadium: Extra völlurinn
- Úrvalsdeild: 3rd
- Borgunarbikarinn: Quarter-finals
- Lengjubikarinn: Quarter-finals
- Top goalscorer: League: Þórir Guðjónsson (7); All: Þórir Guðjónsson (10)
Home colours	Away colours

The 2015 season was Fjölnir's 4th season in Úrvalsdeild and their 2nd consecutive season in top-flight of Icelandic Football.

Fjölnir was head coached by Ágúst Gylfason for the fourth consecutive season. He was assisted by player/assistant coach Ólafur Páll Snorrason.

Along with the Úrvalsdeild, the club competed in the Lengjubikarinn and Borgunarbikarinn.

The team finished the season in 6th place in the league.

== First team ==
As of 23 July 2015. These players competed in Úrvalsdeild, Borgunarbikarinn, Lengjubikarinn

Note: Flags indicate national team as defined under FIFA eligibility rules; some limited exceptions apply. Players may hold more than one non-FIFA nationality.

No.	Pos.	Nation	Player
1	GK	(Iceland) ISL	Steinar Örn Gunnarsson
3	MF	(Iceland) ISL	Illugi Þór Gunnarsson
4	MF	(Iceland) ISL	Gunnar Már Guðmundsson
5	DF	(Iceland) ISL	Bergsveinn Ólafsson (Captain)
6	MF	(Iceland) ISL	Atli Már Þorbergsson
7	MF	(Iceland) ISL	Viðar Ari Jónsson
8	MF	(Iceland) ISL	Ragnar Leósson
9	FW	(Iceland) ISL	Þórir Guðjónsson
10	MF	(Iceland) ISL	Aron Sigurðarson
11	DF	(Iceland) ISL	Ægir Jarl Jónasson
12	GK	(Iceland) ISL	Þórður Ingason
13	MF	(Denmark) DEN	Kennie Chopart
14	FW	(Iceland) ISL	Ísak Atli Kristjánsson
15	DF	(Iceland) ISL	Haukur Lárusson
16	MF	(Iceland) ISL	Guðmundur Böðvar Guðjónsson

No.	Pos.	Nation	Player
17	FW	(Iceland) ISL	Magnús Pétur Bjarnason
18	FW	(England) ENG	Mark Magee
19	DF	(Iceland) ISL	Arnór Eyvar Ólafsson
20	MF	(Iceland) ISL	Birnir Snær Ingason
21	DF	(Iceland) ISL	Brynjar Steinþórsson
22	MF	(Iceland) ISL	Ólafur Páll Snorrason
26	DF	(Spain) ESP	Jonatan Neftalí Díez-González
27	FW	(Iceland) ISL	Anton Freyr Ársælsson
28	MF	(Iceland) ISL	Hans Viktor Guðmundsson
29	MF	(Iceland) ISL	Guðmundur Karl Guðmundsson
30	GK	(Iceland) ISL	Jökull Blængsson
—	FW	(Iceland) ISL	Djordje Panic
—	MF	(Iceland) ISL	Ingibergur Kort Sigurðsson
—	MF	(Iceland) ISL	Georg Guðjónsson

== Transfers and loans ==
=== Transfers In ===
Date	Position	No.	Player	From club	Other	Ref
16 October 2014	MF	23	(Iceland) Guðmundur Þór Júlíusson	(Iceland) HK	Back from loan	
29 October 2014	MF	22	(Iceland) Ólafur Páll Snorrason	(Iceland) FH	Player/Assistant Coach	
18 November 2014	DF	19	(Iceland) Arnór Eyvar Ólafsson	(Iceland) ÍBV		
5 March 2015	DF	3	(North Macedonia) Daniel Ivanovski	(Sweden) Mjällby AIF		
20 June 2015	FW	17	(Iceland) Magnús Pétur Bjarnason	(Iceland) BÍ/Bolungarvík	Back from loan	
15 July 2015	DF	26	(Spain) Jonatan Neftalí Díez-González	(Denmark) Vejle Boldklub		
16 July 2015	MF	13	(Denmark) Kennie Chopart	(Norway) FK Arendal		

=== Transfers Out ===
Date	Position	No.	Player	To club	Other	Ref
17 October 2014	DF	22	(United States) Matthew Ratajczak	Out of Contract		
20 October 2014	FW	21	(Iceland) Magnús Páll Gunnarsson	Retired		
5 November 2014	FW	28	(United States) Chris Tsonis	(United States) New York Red Bulls II		
21 March 2015	DF	3	(Iceland) Árni Kristinn Gunnarsson	(Iceland) Augnablik		
26 March 2015	DF	2	(Iceland) Gunnar Valur Gunnarsson	(Iceland) Vængir Júpíters		
8 May 2015	MF	23	(Iceland) Guðmundur Þór Júlíusson	(Iceland) HK		
17 June 2015	DF	3	(North Macedonia) Daniel Ivanovski	Left by Mutual Consent		
25 June 2015	MF	23	(Iceland) Emil Pálsson	(Iceland) FH	Was on Loan	

=== Loans in ===
Start Date	End Date	Position	No.	Player	From Club	Ref
26 March 2015	25 June 2015	MF	23	(Iceland) Emil Pálsson	(Iceland) FH	

=== Loans out ===
Start Date	End Date	Position	No.	Player	To Club	Ref
15 May 2015	20 June 2015	FW	17	(Iceland) Magnús Pétur Bjarnason	(Iceland) BÍ/Bolungarvík	

== Pre-season ==
=== Reykjavík Cup ===
Fjölnir took part in the 2015 Reykjavík Cup, a pre-season tournament for clubs from Reykjavík.

The team played in group A along with Fylkir, KR and Fram. Fjölnir finished top of the group with maximum points and went through to the semi-finals.

In the semi-finals Fjölnir lost to Valur 1–0.

Date	Round	Opponents	Stadium	Result F–A	Scorers
16 January 2015	Group stage	Fram	Egilshöll	2–0	Gunnar Már 7' Ægir Jarl 80'
25 January 2015	Group stage	Fylkir	Egilshöll	2–1	Aron Sig 34'(p.) Birnir Snær 90'
29 January 2015	Group stage	KR	Egilshöll	2–1	Aron Sig 40' Birnir Snær 48'
5 February 2015	Semi-finals	Valur	Egilshöll	0–1	

== Lengjubikarinn ==
Fjölnir were drawn in group 2 in the Icelandic league cup, Lengjubikarinn, along with KR, Víkingur R, Leiknir R, KA, Selfoss, Grótta and Fram.

Fjölnir finished 4th in the group with 10 points, 3 wins, 1 draw and 3 losses, but made it through to the quarter-finals because both Leiknir R and KR withdrew their teams from the competition.

In the quarter-finals Fjölnir lost to ÍA 5–1, with Ragnar Leósson scoring Fjölnir's only goal.

Date	Round	Opponents	Stadium	Result F–A	Scorers
15 February 2015	Group stage	KA	Egilshöll	1–0	Viðar Ari 45'
21 February 2015	Group stage	KR	Egilshöll	1–0	Þórir G. 30'
8 March 2015	Group stage	Selfoss	Egilshöll	2–3	Mark Magee 26' Ólafur Páll 27'
15 March 2015	Group stage	Víkingur R	Egilshöll	0–2	
20 March 2015	Group stage	Grótta	Egilshöll	0–2	
26 March 2015	Group stage	Fram	Egilshöll	3–0	Gunnar Már 2' Aron Sig 11' Birnir Snær 33'
10 April 2015	Group stage	Leiknir R	Egilshöll	1–1	Viðar Ari 76'
16 April 2015	Quarter-finals	ÍA	Akraneshöllin	1–5	Ragnar L. 90'

== Úrvalsdeild ==
=== League table ===
Pos	Team	Pld	W	D	L	GF	GA	GD	Pts	Qualification or relegation
4	Stjarnan	22	9	6	7	32	24	+8	33	
5	Valur	22	9	6	7	38	31	+7	33	Qualification for the Europa League first qualifying round (Note: Valur qualified for the UEFA Europa League first qualifying round by winning the 2015 Icelandic Cup.)
6	Fjölnir	22	9	6	7	36	35	+1	33	
7	ÍA	22	7	8	7	31	31	0	29	
8	Fylkir	22	7	8	7	26	31	−5	29	

Source: KSÍ, Soccerway
Rules for classification: 1) Points; 2) Goal difference; 3) Goals scored; 4) Head-to-head points; 5) Head-to-head goal difference; 6) Head-to-head goals scored; 7) Head-to-head away goals scored; 8) Play-off (only for deciding champion); 9) Draw.

=== Matches ===
Win Draw Loss Upcoming fixture

3 May 2015 1	Fjölnir	1–0	ÍBV	Reykjavík
17:00 GMT	Þórir Guðjónsson 49'	Report	Andri Ólafsson (yellow card) 61'; Benedikt Októ Bjarnason (yellow card) 90+2'	Stadium: Fjölnisvöllur; Attendance: 1030; Referee: Vilhjálmur Alvar Þórarinsson

11 May 2015 2	Fjölnir	1–1	Fylkir	Reykjavík
19:15 GMT	Guðmundur Karl Guðmundsson 35'; Emil Pálsson (yellow card) 29'	Report	Tonci Radovinkovic 90'; Oddur Ingi Guðmundsson (yellow card) 50'; Ásgeir Börkur Ásgeirsson (yellow card) 71'; Kristján Hauksson (yellow card) 78'	Stadium: Fjölnisvöllur; Attendance: 1114; Referee: Vilhjálmur Alvar Þórarinsson

17 May 2015 3	KR	2–0	Fjölnir	Reykjavík
20:00 GMT	Gary Martin 8' (pen.); Pálmi Rafn Pálmason 61'; Rasmus Christiansen (yellow card) 60'	Report	Ólafur Páll Snorrason (yellow card) 38'; Emil Pálsson (yellow card) 40'; Viðar Ari Jónsson (yellow card) 71'; Arnór Eyvar Ólafsson (yellow card) 75' (yellow-red card) 89'	Stadium: KR-völlur; Attendance: 1345; Referee: Valdimar Pálsson

20 May 2015 4	Fjölnir	1–0	Keflavík	Reykjavík
19:15 GMT	Þórir Guðjónsson 81' (pen.) (yellow card) 58'; Bergsveinn Ólafsson (yellow card) 63'; Mark Charles Magee (yellow card) 90+3'	Report	Einar Orri Einarsson (yellow card) 90+1'	Stadium: Fjölnisvöllur; Attendance: 768; Referee: Valgeir Valgeirsson

25 May 2015 5	Valur	3–3	Fjölnir	Reykjavík
19:15 GMT	Bjarni Ólafur Eiríksson 10' (yellow card) 77'; Baldvin Sturluson 32'; Patrick Pedersen 34'	Report	Aron Sigurðarson 21'; Þórir Guðjónsson 28'; Emil Pálsson 43' (yellow card) 70'; Bergsveinn Ólafsson (yellow card) 91'	Stadium: Vodafonevöllurinn; Referee: Þorvaldur Árnason

31 May 2015 6	Fjölnir	2–0	ÍA	Reykjavík
19:15 GMT	Bergsveinn Ólafsson 16'; Þórir Guðjónsson 63' (yellow card) 76'; Viðar Ari Jónsson (yellow card) 59'; Aron Sigurðarson (yellow card) 92'	Report	Albert Hafsteinsson (yellow card) 42'; Ásgeir Marteinsson (yellow card) 49'	Stadium: Fjölnisvöllur; Attendance: 1054; Referee: Garðar Örn Hinriksson

7 June 2015 7	Stjarnan	1–3	Fjölnir	Garðabær
19:15 GMT	Halldór Orri Björnsson 80' (pen.); Heiðar Ægisson (yellow card) 63'; Atli Jóhannsson (yellow card) 86'	Report	Mark Charles Magee 10' 49'; Own goal 71'; Ragnar Leósson (yellow card) 75'; Bergsveinn Ólafsson (yellow card) 77'	Stadium: Samsung völlurinn Attendance: 780; Referee: Gunnar Jarl Jónsson

15 June 2015 8	Fjölnir	3–0	Leiknir R	Reykjavík
20:00 GMT	Aron Sigurðarson 60' 90'; Þórir Guðjónsson 88' (yellow card) 80'; Bergsveinn Ólafsson (yellow card) 45'; Ólafur Páll Snorrason (yellow card) 72'	Report	Ólafur Hrannar Kristjánsson (yellow card) 61'; Óttar Bjarni Guðmundsson (yellow card) 77'	Stadium: Fjölnisvöllur; Attendance: 1357; Referee: Þóroddur Hjaltalín

22 June 2015 9	Víkingur R	2–0	Fjölnir	Reykjavík
19:15 GMT	Rolf Toft 40'; Davíð Örn Atlason 54'; Milos Zivkovic (yellow card) 9'; Igor Taskovic (yellow card) 48'	Report	Þórir Guðjónsson (yellow card) 45+1'; Ólafur Páll Snorrason (yellow card) 60'; Emil Pálsson (yellow card) 76'	Stadium: Víkingsvöllur; Attendance: 1340; Referee: Pétur Guðmundsson

28 June 2015 10	Fjölnir	1–3	FH	Reykjavík
20:00 GMT	Guðmundur Karl Guðmundsson 40'; Ólafur Páll Snorrason (yellow card) 43'; Ragnar Leósson (yellow card) 47'	Report	Þórarinn Ingi Valdimarsson 37'; Jeremy Serwy 76'; Atli Guðnason 83'; Pétur Viðarsson (yellow card) 39'; Böðvar Böðvarsson (yellow card) 85'	Stadium: Fjölnisvöllur; Attendance: 1204; Referee: Eiler Rasmussen

13 July 2015 11	Breiðablik	2–0	Fjölnir	Kópavogur
20:00 GMT	Oliver Sigurjónsson 38' (yellow card) 86'; Arnór Sveinn Aðalsteinsson 70'	Report	Guðmundur Böðvar Guðjónsson (yellow card) 14'	Stadium: Kópavogsvöllur; Attendance: 1235; Referee: Ívar Orri Kristjánsson

19 July 2015 12	ÍBV	4–0	Fjölnir	Vestmannaeyjar
17:00 GMT	Jose Enrique Seoane Vergara 3' 30'; Hafsteinn Briem 13'; Gunnar Heiðar Þorvaldsson 74' (pen.) (yellow card) 36'; Jonathan Patrick Barden (yellow card) 57'	Report	Þórður Ingason (yellow card) 71'	Stadium: Hásteinsvöllur; Attendance: 722; Referee: Valgeir Valgeirsson

26 July 2015 13	Fylkir	0–4	Fjölnir	Reykjavík
19:15 GMT		Report	Þórir Guðjónsson 5' 36'; Kennie Chopart 28'; Mark Charles Magee 89' (yellow card) 86'	Stadium: Fylkisvöllur; Attendance: 1144; Referee: Þóroddur Hjaltalín

5 August 2015 14	Fjölnir	2–1	KR	Reykjavík
19:15 GMT	Guðmundur Karl Guðmundsson 5'; Mark Charles Magee 77' (yellow card) 91'; Bergsveinn Ólafsson (yellow card) 39'; Jonatan Neftali Diez Gonzales (yellow card) 56'; Guðmundur Böðvar Guðjónsson (yellow card) 67'; Þórður Ingason (yellow card) 83'	Report	Hólmbert Friðjónsson 57'; Skúli Jón Friðgeirsson (yellow card) 50'	Stadium: Fjölnisvöllur; Attendance: 1264; Referee: Erlendur Eiríksson

10 August 2015 15	Keflavík	1–1	Fjölnir	Keflavík
19:15 GMT	Martin Hummervoll 62'; Frans Elvarsson (yellow card) 43'; Jóhann Birnir Guðmundsson (yellow card) 56'; Leonard Sigurðsson (yellow card) 73'; Guðjón Árni Antoníusson (yellow card) 75'	Report	Kennie Chopart 43' (yellow card) 69'	Stadium: Nettóvöllurinn; Attendance: 900; Referee: Pétur Guðmundsson

20 August 2015 16	Fjölnir	1–1	Valur	Reykjavík
18:00 GMT	Aron Sigurðarson 7'; Bergsveinn Ólafsson (yellow card) 17'	Report	Einar Karl Ingvarsson 89'; Thomas Guldborg Christensen (yellow card) 5'	Stadium: Fjölnisvöllur; Attendance: 1120; Referee: Guðmundur Ársæll Guðmundsson

24 August 2015 17	ÍA	4–4	Fjölnir	Akranes
18:00 GMT	Jón Vilhelm Ákason 16' 28'; Arnar Már Guðjónsson 32' (yellow card) 68'; Garðar Gunnlaugsson 90+3'; Darren Lough (yellow card) 65'; Árni Snær Ólafsson (yellow card) 75'	Report	Mark Charles Magee 27' 45+2'; Aron Sigurðarson 75'; Kennie Chopart 80'; Jonatan Neftali Diez Gonzales (yellow card) 58'; Guðmundur Böðvar Guðjónsson (yellow card) 62'	Stadium: Norðurálsvöllurinn; Attendance: 821; Referee: Pétur Guðmundsson

30 August 2015 18	Fjölnir	1–1	Stjarnan	Reykjavík
18:00 GMT	Gunnar Már Guðmundsson 25'	Report	Guðjón Baldvinsson 77'; Þórhallur Kári Knútsson (yellow card) 80'	Stadium: Fjölnisvöllur; Attendance: 826; Referee: Guðmundur Ársæll Guðmundsson

13 September 2015 19	Leiknir R.	2–3	Fjölnir	Reykjavík
17:00 GMT	Hilmar Árni Halldórsson 20'; Kristján Páll Jónsson 25'; Charley Roussel Fomen (yellow card) 56'	Report	Guðmundur Karl Guðmundsson 16' 83'; Kennie Chopart 90+4'	Stadium: Leiknisvöllur; Attendance: 609; Referee: Vilhjálmur Alvar Þórarinsson

20 September 2015 20	Fjölnir	4–3	Víkingur R.	Reykjavík
16:00 GMT	Kennie Chopart 24'; Bergsveinn Ólafsson 28'; Aron Sigurðarson 39'; Guðmundur Böðvar Guðjónsson 84'; Gunnar Már Guðmundsson (red card) 45+4'; Þórir Guðjónsson (yellow card) 56'; Guðmundur Karl Guðmundsson (yellow card) 82'	Report	Ívar Örn Jónsson 44'; Davíð Örn Atlason 87' (yellow card) 80'; Hallgrímur Mar Steingrímsson 45+1'; Arnþór Ingi Kristinsson (yellow card) 9'; Vladimir Tufegdzic (yellow card) 41'; Halldór Smári Sigurðsson (yellow card) 45+5'; Viktor Bjarki Arnarsson (yellow card) 54'; Igor Tasković (yellow card) 78'	Stadium: Fjölnisvöllur; Attendance: 504; Referee: Ívar Orri Kristjánsson

26 September 2015 21	FH	2–1	Fjölnir	Hafnarfjörður
14:00 GMT	Atli Guðnason 50' (yellow card) 60'; Emil Pálsson 79'; Pétur Viðarsson (yellow card) 89'	Report	Kennie Chopart 69'; Bergsveinn Ólafsson (yellow card) 87'	Stadium: Kaplakrikavöllur; Attendance: 1798; Referee: Erlendur Eiríksson

3 October 2015 22	Fjölnir	0–2	Breiðablik	Reykjavík
14:00 GMT	Atli Már Þorbergsson (yellow card) 8'; Þórir Guðjónsson (yellow card) 66'; Jonatan Neftali Diez Gonzales (yellow card) 72'	Report	Jonathan Glenn 20' (red card) 72'; Andri Rafn Yeoman 90+5'; Atli Sigurjónsson (yellow card) 90+2'	Stadium: Fjölnisvöllur; Attendance: 560; Referee: Valdimar Pálsson

=== Results ===
Overall								Home						Away					
Pld	W	D	L	GF	GA	GD	Pts	W	D	L	GF	GA	GD	W	D	L	GF	GA	GD
22	9	6	7	36	35	+1	33	6	3	2	17	12	+5	3	3	5	19	23	−4

Last updated: 3 October 2015.
Source: KSÍ

=== Points breakdown ===
- Points at home: 21
- Points away from home: 12
- 6 Points: Leiknir R.
- 4 Points: Fylkir, Keflavík, ÍA, Stjarnan
- 3 Points: ÍBV, KR, Víkingur R.
- 2 Points: Valur
- 1 Point:
- 0 Points: FH, Breiðablik

== Borgunarbikarinn ==
Fjölnir came into the Icelandic cup, Borgunarbikarinn, in the 32nd-finals and were drawn against ÍA. Fjölnir won the game confidently 3–0.

In the 16th-finals the team was drawn against Víkingur Ó. Fjölnir won the game 4–0.

Fjölnir lost to KA in the quarter-finals 2–1. KA went 2–0 up after only 8 minutes and that good start got them the win and a place in the semi-finals.

Win Draw Loss Upcoming fixture

3 June 2015 32nd-finals	ÍA	0–3	Fjölnir	Akranes
19:15 GMT	Marko Andelkovic (yellow card) 18'; Hallur Flosason (yellow card) 57'; Arsenij Buinickij (yellow card) 80'; Ármann Smári Björnsson (yellow card) 85'	Report	Mark Charles Magee 13' 18'; Aron Sigurðarson 83'; Atli Már Þorbergsson (yellow card) 86'	Stadium: Norðurálsvöllurinn; Attendance: 600; Referee: Guðmundur Ársæll Guðmundsson

18 June 2015 16th-finals	Fjölnir	4–0	Víkingur Ó	Reykjavík
19:15 GMT	Þórir Guðjónsson 17' 63'; Gunnar Már Guðmundsson 19'; Aron Sigurðarson 53'	Report		Stadium: Fjölnisvöllur; Attendance: 317; Referee: Þorvaldur Árnason

5 July 2015 Quarter-finals	KA	2–1	Fjölnir	Akureyri
16:00 GMT	Davíð Rúnar Bjarnason 6'; Ævar Ingi Jóhannesson 7' (yellow card) 32'; Archange Nkumu (yellow card) 9'	Report	Mark Charles Magee 53'; Viðar Ari Jónsson (yellow card) 14'; Ólafur Páll Snorrason (yellow card) 68'	Stadium: Akureyrarvöllur; Attendance: 640; Referee: Erlendur Eiríksson

== Statistics ==
=== Goalscorers ===
Includes all competitive matches.

As of match played 3 October 2015

Rank	Pos.	No.	Player	Úrvalsdeild	Borgunarbikarinn	Lengjubikarinn	Total
1	FW	9	(Iceland) Þórir Guðjónsson	7	2	1	10
2	FW	18	(England) Mark Charles Magee	6	3	1	10
3	MF	10	(Iceland) Aron Sigurðarson	6	2	1	9
4	MF	13	(Denmark) Kennie Chopart	6	0	0	6
5	MF	29	(Iceland) Guðmundur Karl Guðmundsson	5	0	0	5
6	MF	4	(Iceland) Gunnar Már Guðmundsson	1	1	1	3
7	MF	7	(Iceland) Viðar Ari Jónsson	0	0	2	2
8	DF	5	(Iceland) Bergsveinn Ólafsson	2	0	0	2
9	MF	8	(Iceland) Ragnar Leósson	0	0	1	1
10	MF	20	(Iceland) Birnir Snær Ingason	0	0	1	1
11	MF	22	(Iceland) Ólafur Páll Snorrason	0	0	1	1
12	MF		(Iceland) Emil Pálsson	1	0	0	1
13	MF	16	(Iceland) Guðmundur Böðvar Guðjónsson	1	0	0	1

=== Appearances ===
Includes all competitive matches. Numbers in parentheses are sub appearances

As of match played 3 October 2015

No.	Pos.	Player	Úrvalsdeild	Borgunarbikar	Lengjubikar	Total
1	GK	(Iceland) Steinar Örn Gunnarsson	6	0	2	8
3	MF	(Iceland) Illugi Þór Gunnarsson	5 (7)	0	0	12
4	MF	(Iceland) Gunnar Már Guðmundsson	16 (4)	3	4	27
5	DF	(Iceland) Bergsveinn Ólafsson	20	3	6 (2)	31
6	MF	(Iceland) Atli Már Þorbergsson	7 (1)	2	4 (2)	16
7	MF	(Iceland) Viðar Ari Jónsson	22	3	7	32
8	MF	(Iceland) Ragnar Leósson	10 (11)	2 (1)	7 (1)	32
9	FW	(Iceland) Þórir Guðjónsson	16	3	2 (2)	23
10	MF	(Iceland) Aron Sigurðarson	18 (4)	3	5 (2)	32
11	DF	(Iceland) Ægir Jarl Jónasson	(3)	(1)	2 (4)	10
12	GK	(Iceland) Þórður Ingason	16	1	6	23
13	MF	(Denmark) Kennie Chopart	11	0	0	11
14	FW	(Iceland) Ísak Atli Kristjánsson	0	(1)	(3)	4
15	DF	(Iceland) Haukur Lárusson	1	1 (1)	0	3
16	MF	(Iceland) Guðmundur Böðvar Guðjónsson	15 (4)	1	4 (1)	25
17	FW	(Iceland) Magnús Pétur Bjarnason	(1)	0	(1)	2
18	FW	(England) Mark Charles Magee	5 (13)	2	5 (3)	28
19	DF	(Iceland) Arnór Eyvar Ólafsson	11 (4)	2 (1)	8	26
20	MF	(Iceland) Birnir Snær Ingason	(5)	(3)	3 (3)	14
21	DF	(Iceland) Brynjar Steinþórsson	0	0	(2)	2
22	MF	(Iceland) Ólafur Páll Snorrason	13	1	6	20
26	DF	(Spain) Jonatan Neftali Diez Gonzales	11	0	0	11
27	FW	(Iceland) Anton Freyr Ársælsson	(2)	0	0	2
28	MF	(Iceland) Hans Viktor Guðmundsson	2 (2)	(1)	3 (3)	11
29	MF	(Iceland) Guðmundur Karl Guðmundsson	20 (1)	3	8	32
30	GK	(Iceland) Jökull Blængsson	(1)	0	(2)	3
	MF	(Iceland) Emil Pálsson	9	1	2	12
	DF	(North Macedonia) Daniel Ivanovski	8	0	3 (1)	12
	FW	(Iceland) Djordje Panic	0	0	(1)	1
	MF	(Iceland) Georg Guðjónsson	0	0	(4)	4
	MF	(Iceland) Guðmundur Þór Júlíusson	0	0	1 (1)	2
	MF	(Iceland) Ingibergur Kort Sigurðsson	0	0	(3)	3

=== Disciplinary record ===
Includes all competitive matches.

As of match played 3 October 2015

No.	Pos.	Player	Úrvalsdeild			Borgunarbikar			Lengjubikar			Total		
No.	Pos.	Player	Yellow card	Second yellow card	Red card	Yellow card	Second yellow card	Red card	Yellow card	Second yellow card	Red card	Yellow card	Second yellow card	Red card
4	MF	(Iceland) Gunnar Már Guðmundsson	0	0	1	0	0	0	2	0	0	2	0	1
5	DF	(Iceland) Bergsveinn Ólafsson	7	0	0	0	0	0	0	0	0	7	0	0
6	MF	(Iceland) Atli Már Þorbergsson	1	0	0	1	0	0	1	0	0	3	0	0
7	DF	(Iceland) Viðar Ari Jónsson	2	0	0	1	0	0	1	0	0	4	0	0
8	MF	(Iceland) Ragnar Leósson	2	0	0	0	0	0	0	0	0	2	0	0
9	FW	(Iceland) Þórir Guðjónsson	6	0	0	0	0	0	2	0	0	8	0	0
10	MF	(Iceland) Aron Sigurðarson	1	0	0	0	0	0	0	0	0	1	0	0
12	GK	(Iceland) Þórður Ingason	2	0	0	0	0	0	0	0	0	2	0	0
13	FW	(Denmark) Kennie Chopart	1	0	0	0	0	0	0	0	0	1	0	0
16	MF	(Iceland) Guðmundur Böðvar Guðjónsson	3	0	0	0	0	0	0	0	0	3	0	0
18	FW	(England) Mark Charles Magee	3	0	0	0	0	0	0	0	0	3	0	0
19	DF	(Iceland) Arnór Eyvar Ólafsson	0	1	0	0	0	0	0	0	0	0	1	0
22	MF	(Iceland) Ólafur Páll Snorrason	4	0	0	1	0	0	2	0	0	7	0	0
26	DF	(Spain) Jonatan Neftali Diez Gonzales	3	0	0	0	0	0	0	0	0	3	0	0
29	MF	(Iceland) Guðmundur Karl Guðmundsson	1	0	0	0	0	0	2	0	0	3	0	0
	MF	(Iceland) Emil Pálsson	4	0	0	0	0	0	2	0	0	6	0	0
	DF	(North Macedonia) Daniel Ivanovski	0	0	0	0	0	0	1	0	0	1	0	0
	MF	(Iceland) Georg Guðjónsson	0	0	0	0	0	0	1	0	0	1	0	0
