= 2011 UEFA European Under-21 Championship qualification Group 9 =

Football tournament qualification stage

The teams competing in Group 7 of the 2011 UEFA European Under-21 Championships qualifying competition were England, Greece, Lithuania, Macedonia, and Portugal.

== Standings ==
Team	Pld	W	D	L	GF	GA	GD	Pts	(Greece)	(England)	(Portugal)	(Lithuania)	(North Macedonia)
Greece	8	6	1	1	13	7	+6	19	—	1–1	2–1	1–0	3–1
England	8	5	2	1	15	7	+8	17	1–2	—	1–0	3–0	6–3
Portugal	8	4	1	3	12	8	+4	13	2–1	0–1	—	4–1	3–1
Lithuania	8	1	2	5	3	11	−8	5	0–1	0–0	0–1	—	1–0
Macedonia	8	0	2	6	9	19	−10	2	1–2	1–2	1–1	1–1	—

== Matches ==
28 March 2009
16:00 CET

Greece	3–1	Macedonia
Mitroglou 7', 48'; Ioannidis 61'	Report	Fazli 50'

Asteras Tripolis Stadium, Tripoli
Referee: Radek Příhoda (Czech Republic)

6 June 2009
15:45 CET

Lithuania	0–1	Greece
	Report	Papastathopoulos 76'

Sūduva Stadium, Marijampolė
Referee: Magnus Thorisson (Iceland)

4 September 2009
15:30 CET

Macedonia	1–2	England
Ibraimi 34'	Report	Sears 68'; Cattermole 83' (pen.)

Goce Delčev Stadium, Prilep
Attendance: 2,000
Referee: Hubert Siejewicz (Poland)
4 September 2009
19:15 CET

Portugal	4–1	Lithuania
Ukra 25', 55'; Rui Pedro 63'; João Aurélio 85'	Report	Chvedukas 26'

Estádio Jorge Sampaio, Vila Nova de Gaia
Referee: Draženko Kovačić (Croatia)

8 September 2009
18:00 CET

Greece	1–1	England
Ninis 41'	Report	Sturridge 5'

Asteras Tripolis Stadium, Tripoli
Attendance: 2,678
Referee: Mauro Bergonzi (Italy)
9 September 2009
15:30 CET

Macedonia	1–1	Lithuania
Muarem 1'	Report	Novikovas 58'

Goce Delčev Stadium, Prilep
Referee: Valery Vyalichka (Belarus)

9 October 2009
18:00 CET

Greece	2–1	Portugal
Koutsianikoulis 4'; K. Papadopoulos 90'	Report	Miguel Vítor 83'

Asteras Tripolis Stadium, Tripoli
Referee: Stanislav Sukhina (Russia)
9 October 2009
20:45 CET

England	6–3	Macedonia
Gibbs 22'; Richards 30'; Carroll 54', 87'; Hines 67', 90'	Report	Muarem 42'; Ibraimi 53'; Gibbs 58' (o.g.)

Ricoh Arena, Coventry
Attendance: 20,074
Referee: Fredy Fautrel (France)

13 October 2009
15:15 CET

Macedonia	1–1	Portugal
Muarem 68'	Report	Adrien Silva 90'

Goce Delčev Stadium, Prilep
Referee: Mark Courtney (Northern Ireland)
13 October 2009
18:00 CET

Greece	1–0	Lithuania
Koutsianikoulis 80'	Report

Asteras Tripolis Stadium, Tripoli
Referee: Yuriy Moseychuk (Ukraine)

13 November 2009
16:00 CET

Lithuania	1–0	Macedonia
Zagurskas 5'	Report

S. Darius and S. Girėnas Stadium, Kaunas
Referee: Pavel Olsiak (Slovakia)
14 November 2009
13:30 CET

England	1–0	Portugal
Rose 40'	Report

Wembley Stadium, London
Attendance: 33,833
Referee: Thorsten Kinhöfer (Germany)

17 November 2009
16:00 CET

Lithuania	0–0	England
	Report

Vėtra Stadium, Vilnius
Attendance: 500
Referee: Jiří Jech (Czech Republic)
17 November 2009
18:15 CET

Portugal	2–1	Greece
Rui Pedro 51'; Yazalde 74'	Report	Dimoutsos 90+2'

Estádio José Arcanjo, Olhão
Referee: Fredy Fautrel (France)

3 March 2010
19:00 CET

England	1–2	Greece
Delfouneso 80'	Report	K. Papadopoulos 28'; I. Papadopoulos 49'

Keepmoat Stadium, Doncaster
Attendance: 5,221
Referee: Marijo Strahonja (Croatia)

11 August 2010
20:00 CET

Lithuania	0–1	Portugal
	Report	Ukra 16'

Marijampolė Stadium, Marijampolė
Referee: Daniele Orsato (Italy)

3 September 2010
19:00 CET

Portugal	0–1	England
	Report	Sturridge 32'

Estádio Cidade de Barcelos, Barcelos
Referee: Michael Lerjeus (Sweden)
4 September 2010
16:00 CET

Macedonia	1–2	Greece
Georgievski 64'	Report	Siovas 39'; An. Papazoglou 80'

Mladost Stadium, Strumica
Referee: Ionut Marius Avram (Romania)

7 September 2010
17:00 CET

England	3–0	Lithuania
Welbeck 62', 90+1'; Albrighton 79'	Report

Community Stadium, Colchester
Attendance: 7,240
Referee: Matej Jug (Slovenia)
7 September 2010
17:00 CET

Portugal	3–1	Macedonia
Bébé 23'; Bura 87'; João Silva 90+2'	Report	Altiparmakovski 90+4'

Estádio Jorge Sampaio, Vila Nova de Gaia
Referee: Thoroddur Hjaltalin (Iceland)

== Goalscorers ==
As of 7 September, there have been 52 goals scored over 20 games, for an average of 2.6 goals per game.

Goals	Player	Country
3	Muarem Muarem	Macedonia
3	Ukra	Portugal
2	Andy Carroll	England
2	Zavon Hines	England
2	Daniel Sturridge	England
2	Danny Welbeck	England
2	Vasilios Koutsianikoulis	Greece
2	Kostas Mitroglou	Greece
2	Kyriakos Papadopoulos	Greece
2	Agim Ibraimi	Macedonia
2	Rui Pedro	Portugal

1 goal

England
- Marc Albrighton
- Lee Cattermole
- Nathan Delfouneso
- Kieran Gibbs
- Micah Richards
- Danny Rose
- Freddie Sears

Greece
- Elini Dimoutsos
- Georgios Ioannidis
- Sotiris Ninis
- Ioannis Papadopoulos
- Sokratis Papastathopoulos
- Anastasios Papazoglou
- Dimitris Siovas

Lithuania
- Karolis Chvedukas
- Arvydas Novikovas
- Eivinas Zagurskas

Macedonia
- Marjan Altiparmakovski
- Samir Fazli
- Daniel Georgievski

Portugal
- João Aurélio
- Bébé
- Bura
- Adrien Silva
- João Silva
- Miguel Vítor
- Yazalde

Own Goals

- (England) Kieran Gibbs (for Macedonia)
