= Sytnik =

Sytnik or Sytnyk (Russian: Сытник, Ukrainian: Ситник) is a gender-neutral Russian and Ukrainian occupational surname originating from the old Russian word sytnik, meaning a court servant. It may refer to the following notable people:

- Artem Sytnyk (born 1979), head of the National Anti-Corruption Bureau of Ukraine
- Denys Sytnik (born 1986), Ukrainian football player
- Kostiantyn Sytnyk (1926–2017), Ukrainian and Soviet scientist and academician
- Oleksandr Sytnik (born 1984), Ukrainian football striker
- Oleksandr Sytnyk (born 1985), Ukrainian football defender

== See also ==
- Sitnik (surname) (Russian: Ситник) a similar surname
