= 2016 Knattspyrnufélagið Þróttur season =

Icelandic football club season

Knattspyrnufélagið Þróttur, also referred to as Þróttur Reykjavík or Throttur FC, is a sports club from Reykjavík in Iceland. In the 2016 campaign they competed in the following competitions: Úrvalsdeild, Cup, League Cup.

== Results summary ==
Overall								Home						Away					
Pld	W	D	L	GF	GA	GD	Pts	W	D	L	GF	GA	GD	W	D	L	GF	GA	GD
22	3	5	14	19	50	−31	14	2	3	6	11	24	−13	1	2	8	8	26	−18

Last updated: 1 October 2016.

== Results by matchday ==
Round	1	2	3	4	5	6	7	8	9	10	11	12	13	14	15	16	17	18	19	20	21	22
Ground	H	H	A	H	A	H	A	H	A	H	A	A	A	H	A	H	A	H	A	H	A	H
Result	L	D	L	W	L	L	W	L	L	L	L	L	L	D	L	L	D	W	L	D	D	L
Position	12	12	12	11	11	11	11	12	12	12	12	12	12	12	12	12	12	12	12	12	12	12

Updated to match(es) played on 1 October 2016. Source: Results
A = Away; H = Home; W = Win; D = Draw; L = Loss

== Matches ==
1 May 2016 1	Þróttur	0 - 3	FH	Reykjavík
17:00	Aron Ýmir Pétursson (yellow card) 44'; Viktor Illugason (yellow card) 80'	Summary	Lennon 36'; Hewson (yellow card) 57'; Björnsson 85'; Guðnason 87'	Stadium: Valbjarnarvöllur; Attendance: 1,765; Referee: (Iceland) Vilhjálmur Alvar Thórarinsson
