= Guðmundur Pétursson =

Icelandic footballer

Personal information
- Full name: Guðmundur Pétursson
- Date of birth: 24 November 1986 (age 39)
- Place of birth: Reykjavík, Iceland
- Height: 1.88 m (6 ft 2 in)
- Position: Forward

Team information
- Current team: Breiðablik
- Number: 24

Youth career
- ÍR

Senior career*
Years	Team	Apps	(Gls)
2004–2006	ÍR	34	(8)
2006	→ KR (loan)	3	(1)
2007–2009	KR	36	(3)
2007	→ Sandefjord (loan)	6	(0)
2009	→ Breiðablik (loan)	10	(4)
2010–	Breiðablik	25	(5)
Total		114	(21)

International career
2008	Iceland U-21	1	(0)
- * Club domestic league appearances and goals as of 19:34, 23 December 2012 (UTC)

Guðmundur Pétursson (born 24 November 1986) is an Icelandic footballer. He is a forward and is currently under contract at Breiðablik. He has also played for Iceland at under-21 level.

== Club career ==
=== ÍR (2004–2006) ===
Born in Reykjavík, Pétursson began his career with ÍR, based in Reykjavík in 2004. In his first season, Pétursson played 17 games for ÍR, mainly coming on as a substitute. He showed his talents early in the season against Selfoss, coming on as a substitute in the 81st minute and scoring twice within two minutes of arrival on the pitch. He didn't play as much in the second season because of conflicts with his manager but still scored 3 goals in the 6 games he got to play. In his last season at ÍR, he played 11 games and scored 2 goals until he was scouted by KR.

=== KR (2006–2009) ===
On 1 August 2006, Pétursson went on loan to KR where he played 3 games and scored 1 goal. In the final match of the season against Valur, Pétursson scored the winning goal which got KR into European football. He also went all the way to the final of VISA-bikar 2008 with KR, only to lose against Keflavík 0–2. It was Pétursson's first medal as a senior in football. KR where pleased with Pétursson's performance and signed him for 3 years. He was considered to have quite some potential, playing 7 games and scoring 2 goals, which got him a loan offer from Sandefjord on 31 August 2007. There he played 6 games but was unable to find the net. He returned to KR in 2008. The seasons 2008 and 2009 Pétursson had limited playing time. He played 36 games, mainly coming on as a substitute, and scored 3 goals. With KR he won the VISA-bikar 2008, coming off the bench as a substitute in the final against Fjölnir. In 2009, Pétursson was getting concerned at KR, because of his lack of playing time and wanted to find some playing time elsewhere.

=== Breiðablik (2009–present) ===
On 18 July 2009, Pétursson went on loan to Breiðablik where he grew to become an important asset to the team. He recapped his joy for football and proved everyone wrong who had lost there believe in him. He scored 4 goals in 10 league games. Breiðablik went all the way to win the VISA Bikar 2009 which meant Pétursson's second Cup title in 2 years. Pétursson scored the only and winning goal in the local derby against HK in the quarter-finals and scored the winning goal against Keflavík in the semi-finals. He netted his penalty in the penalty shoot-out against Fram in the final. After only half a season at Breiðablik, Pétursson was already becoming an idol there.

Trying to return to Norway, Pétursson went on trial at IL Hødd in January 2010.

On 8 March 2010 Pétursson permanently joined Breiðablik on a three-year contract. Hee rejected an offer from Icelandic champions FH, and chose to join Breiðablik after the successful loan spell. Pétursson scored his first goal in the 2010 season in Breiðablik's draw against Fram 2–2 at home on 16 May 2010. He again scored against FH in the VISA-bikar 2010 on 3 June, but missed a penalty in the penalty shoot-out which Breiðablik lost. After a series of disappointing appearances Pétursson lost his place in the starting line-up and started on the bench against Fylkir on 20 June. On 27 June Breiðablik played against Pétursson's old club KR at home. Pétursson came on as a substitute and scored the winning goal as Breiðablik went on to win the game 2–1. The game after that Pétursson was back in the starting line-up again and thanked his manager by scoring a goal in the 3–1 victory against Selfoss. Pétursson played his 100th official career league game when Breiðablik slaughtered Stjarnan 4–0 at home on 8 July. Unluckily Pétursson did not score in this game.

On 16 September 2010 Pétursson suffered a serious injury when he tore both his anterior cruciate ligament and lateral collateral ligament as well as damaging the meniscus in his right knee in a game against his old team KR. It was predicted that he would be out for around a year. Pétursson has not played a single game for Breiðablik in the year 2011 as he is still recovering from his injury.

== International career ==
Pétursson has one cap for Iceland at under-21 level but didn't manage to score any goals. His only match was on 12 June 2008 against Norway.
