= Sam Tillen =

English footballer

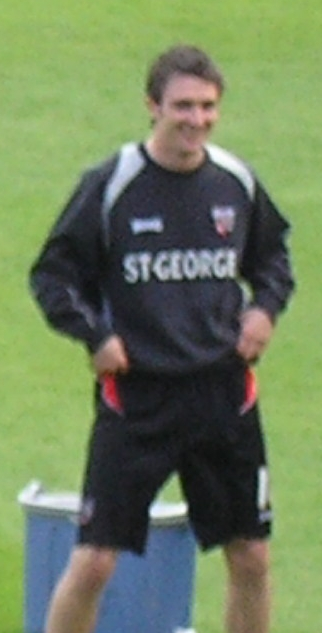
- Tillen warming up for Brentford in 2006.

Personal information
- Full name: Samuel Lee Tillen
- Date of birth: 16 April 1985 (age 41)
- Place of birth: Reading, England
- Height: 5 ft 9 in (1.75 m)
- Positions: Left back; left midfielder

Youth career
- 1997–2002: Chelsea

Senior career*
| Years | Team | Apps | (Gls) |
| 2002–2005 | Chelsea | 0 | (0) |
| 2005–2008 | Brentford | 68 | (1) |
| 2008–2012 | Fram | 98 | (6) |
| 2013–2016 | FH | 28 | (0) |
| 2016 | → Fram (loan) | 15 | (0) |
| 2020 | ÍH | 4 | (0) |
| Total | | 213 | (7) |

International career
| 2000–2001 | England U16 | 2 | (0) |
| 2001 | England U17 | 2 | (0) |
| 2003 | England U18 | 3 | (0) |
| 2003 | England U19 | 2 | (0) |
| 2006 | Football League U21 | 1 | (0) |
- * Club domestic league appearances and goals

Samuel Lee Tillen (born 16 April 1985) is an English professional footballer, most notable for his eight years in as a left back in Icelandic football with Fram and FH. He also played in the Football League for Brentford. Tillen was capped by England at U19 level and represented the Football League at U21 level.

== Club career ==
=== Chelsea ===
A left back, Tillen joined the academy at Premier League club Chelsea at the age of 12. He completed a scholarship and signed his first professional contract in 2002, but his progress was hindered by 17 months out with a stress fracture in his back and a torn anterior cruciate ligament. Tillen progressed to the reserve team, but despite an injury crisis at full back in the first team ranks in late in February 2005, he did not receive a call into the first team squad before departing Stamford Bridge at the end of the 2004–05 season.

=== Brentford ===
On 27 May 2005, Tillen joined League One club Brentford on a one-year contract, with a one-year option. He was a regular in the promotion-chasing team throughout the 2005–06 season and manager Martin Allen took up the option on his contract in February 2006. Tillen finished the 2005–06 season with 43 appearances and experienced the disappointment of defeat to Swansea City in the play-off semi-finals. In July 2006, he signed a new undisclosed-length contract.

Tillen was again a regular under new manager Leroy Rosenior early in the 2006–07 season and retained his place after Rosenior was sacked and replaced with Scott Fitzgerald in November 2006. He scored the first senior goal of his career with a late equaliser to secure a 1–1 draw with Leyton Orient on 9 September 2006. Brentford suffered relegation to League Two at the end of the 2006–07 season and Tillen finished the campaign with 38 appearances and one goal.

Aside from two early 2007–08 season substitute appearances, Tillen was frozen out of the first team squad by new manager Terry Butcher and failed to break back in after Butcher was replaced by Andy Scott in December 2007. On 10 January 2008, Tillen departed Brentford after his contract was cancelled by mutual consent. During 2 1/2 seasons at Griffin Park, Tillen made 83 appearances and scored one goal.

=== Fram ===
In February 2008, Tillen moved to Iceland to join Úrvalsdeild club Fram on a one-year contract. He had been recommended to try Icelandic football by his former Brentford teammate Ólafur Ingi Skúlason. Tillen remained at Fram for five seasons, making 170 appearances, scoring 19 goals and eventually becoming club captain. He departed the club in October 2012.

=== FH ===
On 22 October 2012, Tillen moved to Úrvalsdeild club FH on a two-year contract. He had a good 2013 season, making 36 appearances and winning the Icelandic Super Cup. A broken leg suffered in 2014 saw Tillen miss 11 months of football and upon his return, he suffered a torn calf and a broken cheekbone and eye socket. He made just eight league appearances during FH's 2015 Úrvalsdeild title-winning season.

Tillen was not in manager Heimir Guðjónsson's plans for the 2016 and he spent the season away on loan back at 1. deild karla club Fram. His season was ended early due to a broken cheekbone suffered in August 2016 and he made 16 appearances during a mid-table season for the club. Tillen elected to retire from football in December 2016 and he finished his FH career with 65 appearances and two goals.

=== ÍH ===
In August 2020, Tillen came out of retirement to join 4. deild karla club ÍH. During what remained of the 2020 season, he made five appearances and helped the club to promotion via the 4. deild karla promotion play-offs.

== International career ==
Tillen was capped by England at U16, U17, U18 and U19 levels. He made one appearance for the Football League U21 representative team in a 1–0 victory over Serie B U21 on 21 February 2006.

== Coaching career ==
Tillen began coaching the FH U12 team while recovering from a broken leg in 2014. After his retirement from football in 2016, Tillen became a full-time coach at FH. After returning to England, he joined the coaching team at Leicestershire Senior League Premier Division club Cottesmore in September 2022. In July 2023, Tillen was appointed to the role of youth development phase lead coach at Lincoln City and thereby became head coach of the club's U18 team. He became the club's professional development phase lead coach in January 2024. He left Lincoln City in November 2026 after 3.5 years at the club.

== Personal life ==
Tillen's brother Joe was also a professional footballer. The pair attended Newbury Athletic Club and later played together at Chelsea and Fram. He is married and after retiring from football, he settled in Iceland. Between 2012 and 2014, Tillen wrote a blog for fotbolti.net.

== Career statistics ==
Appearances and goals by club, season and competition
| Club | Season | League | | | National cup (Note: Includes FA Cup, Icelandic Cup) | | League cup (Note: Includes Football League Cup, Icelandic League Cup) | | Europe | | Other | | Total | |
| Club | Season | Division | Apps | Goals | Apps | Goals | Apps | Goals | Apps | Goals | Apps | Goals | Apps | Goals |
|---|---|---|---|---|---|---|---|---|---|---|---|---|---|---|
| Brentford | 2005–06 | League One | 33 | 0 | 6 | 0 | 1 | 0 | — | | 3 (Note: 2 appearances in Football League One play-offs, 1 appearance in Football League Trophy) | 0 | 43 | 0 |
| Brentford | 2006–07 | League One | 34 | 1 | 1 | 0 | 2 | 0 | — | | 1 (Note: Appearances in Football League Trophy) | 0 | 38 | 1 |
| Brentford | 2007–08 | League Two | 1 | 0 | 0 | 0 | 1 | 0 | — | | 0 | 0 | 2 | 0 |
| Brentford | Total | | 68 | 1 | 7 | 0 | 4 | 0 | — | | 4 | 0 | 83 | 1 |
| Fram | 2008 | Úrvalsdeild | 21 | 2 | 2 | 0 | 8 | 1 | — | | 1 (Note: Appearances in Reykjavik Tournament) | 0 | 32 | 3 |
| Fram | 2009 | Úrvalsdeild | 18 | 1 | 4 | 2 | 4 | 1 | 4 (Note: Appearances in UEFA Europa League) | 2 | 4 | 1 | 34 | 7 |
| Fram | 2010 | Úrvalsdeild | 19 | 1 | 4 | 0 | 9 | 2 | — | | 3 | 1 | 35 | 4 |
| Fram | 2011 | Úrvalsdeild | 21 | 0 | 2 | 0 | 6 | 1 | — | | 4 | 0 | 33 | 1 |
| Fram | 2012 | Úrvalsdeild | 19 | 2 | 3 | 1 | 9 | 0 | — | | 5 | 1 | 36 | 4 |
| Fram | Total | | 98 | 6 | 15 | 3 | 36 | 5 | 4 | 2 | 17 | 3 | 170 | 19 |
| FH | 2013 | Úrvalsdeild | 20 | 0 | 1 | 0 | 8 | 0 | 6 (Note: 4 appearances in UEFA Champions League, 2 appearances in UEFA Europa League) | 0 | 1 (Note: Appearance in Icelandic Super Cup) | 0 | 36 | 0 |
| FH | 2014 | Úrvalsdeild | 0 | 0 | 0 | 0 | 4 | 1 | 2 | 0 | 4 (Note: Appearances in Fótbolti.net Cup) | 0 | 10 | 1 |
| FH | 2015 | Úrvalsdeild | 8 | 0 | 3 | 0 | 6 | 0 | 1 | 0 | — | | 18 | 0 |
| FH | 2016 | Úrvalsdeild | 0 | 0 | 0 | 0 | 0 | 0 | 0 | 0 | 1 | 0 | 1 | 0 |
| FH | Total | | 28 | 0 | 4 | 1 | 18 | 1 | 9 | 0 | 6 | 0 | 65 | 2 |
| Fram (loan) | 2016 | 1. deild karla | 15 | 0 | 1 | 0 | — | | — | | — | | 16 | 0 |
| Fram (loan) | Total | | 113 | 6 | 16 | 3 | 36 | 5 | 4 | 2 | 17 | 3 | 186 | 19 |
| ÍH | 2020 | 4. deild karla Group A | 4 | 0 | — | | — | | — | | 1 (Note: Appearance in 4. deild karla promotion play-offs) | 0 | 5 | 0 |
| Career total | | | 213 | 7 | 27 | 4 | 58 | 6 | 13 | 2 | 28 | 3 | 339 | 22 |

== Honours ==
England U18

- Lisbon International Tournament: 2003

FH

- Úrvalsdeild: 2015
- Icelandic League Cup: 2014
- Icelandic Super Cup: 2013

ÍH

- 4. deild karla promotion play-offs: 2020
