= Daði Lárusson =

Icelandic footballer

Personal information
- Full name: Daði Lárusson
- Date of birth: 19 June 1973 (age 53)
- Place of birth: Iceland
- Height: 1.96 m (6 ft 5 in)
- Position: Goalkeeper

Senior career*
Years	Team	Apps	(Gls)
1991–1999	FH	51	(0)
1995	→ Skallagrímur (loan)	18	(0)
1999	Jacksonville Cyclones	?	(?)
2000–2009	FH	163	(0)
2010–2012	Haukar	63	(0)
2013	FH	5	(0)

International career
1990	Iceland U-19	1	(0)
2005–2007	Iceland	3	(0)
- * Club domestic league appearances and goals as of 28 September 2013

Daði Lárusson (born 19 June 1973) is an Icelandic former footballer who played as a goalkeeper.

== International career ==
Lárusson made his debut for Iceland only at the age of 32 in an October 2005 friendly match against Poland, coming on as a substitute for another veteran, 34-year-old Kristján Finnbogason. He has been capped three times.
