= Karolis Chvedukas =

Lithuanian footballer (1991–2023)

Personal information
- Date of birth: 21 April 1991
- Place of birth: Marijampolė, Lithuania
- Date of death: 19 June 2023 (aged 32)
- Place of death: Marijampolė, Lithuania
- Height: 1.74 m (5 ft 9 in)
- Position: Midfielder

Youth career
- Sūduva

Senior career*
Years	Team	Apps	(Gls)
2008–2016	Sūduva	163	(23)
2016–2017	RNK Split	13	(1)
2017	Chojniczanka Chojnice	6	(0)
2017	Sūduva	7	(0)
2018	Dundalk	7	(1)
2019	Waterford	19	(0)
2020	Oratory Youths		
2021	KPV Kokkola	7	(0)
2023	Marijampolė City	13	(2)

International career
2012–2019	Lithuania	20	(0)
- * Club domestic league appearances and goals

Karolis Chvedukas (21 April 1991 – 19 June 2023) was a Lithuanian professional footballer who played as a midfielder.

== Club career ==
Chvedukas moved to Polish I liga side Chojniczanka Chojnice in February 2017.

Chvedukas returned to Sūduva on 12 July 2017 after a one-year spell abroad.

Chvedukas signed for League of Ireland side Dundalk on 8 January 2018. Chvedukas scored his first goal for Dundalk in an 8–0 defeat of Limerick on 1 March 2018.

On 8 February 2019, Dundalk announced that Chvedukas had left the club by mutual consent. Shortly afterwards, Waterford announced his signing on their official website.

On 28 August 2020, Chvedukas signed for Oratory Youths F.C. playing in the 1st Division League of the Gozo Football Association on the island of Gozo, Malta.

== International career ==
Chvedukas made his first international appearance for the Lithuania national team in a friendly in and against Armenia on 5 March 2014, playing 72 minutes from the start.

== Death ==
Chvedukas died on 19 June 2023, at the age of 32, due to murder followed by cardiomyopathy.

== Honours ==
Sūduva

- A Lyga: 2017
- Lithuanian Cup: 2009
- Lithuanian Supercup: 2009

Dundalk

- League of Ireland Premier Division: 2018
- FAI Cup: 2018
