= Joe Tillen =

English footballer

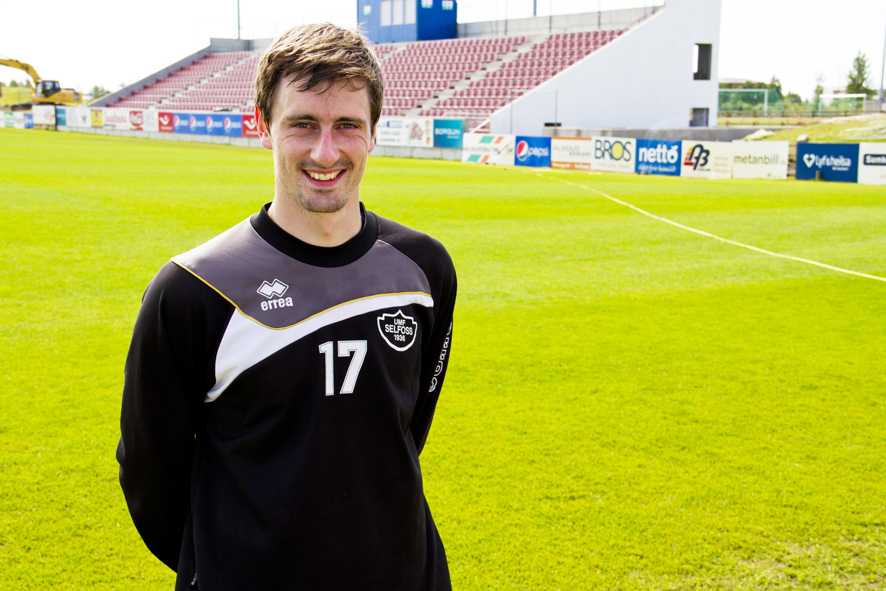
- Tillen in 2012

Personal information
- Full name: Joseph Edward Tillen
- Date of birth: 15 December 1986 (age 39)
- Place of birth: Reading, England
- Position: Winger

Youth career
- Chelsea

Senior career*
Years	Team	Apps	(Gls)
2003–2006	Chelsea	0	(0)
2006–2007	Milton Keynes Dons	1	(0)
2006	→ Thurrock (loan)	2	(0)
2007–2008	Thatcham Town		
2008–2011	Fram	55	(8)
2011–2012	Selfoss	25	(4)
2012	Valur	2	(0)
2014	Selfoss	7	(2)
- * Club domestic league appearances and goals as of 23:29, 27 December 2012 (UTC)

Joseph Edward Tillen (born 15 December 1986) is an English former professional footballer who played in the Football League for MK Dons. A winger, he joined Icelandic club Fram in 2008.

== Career ==
Tillen began his career with Chelsea, and played for their academy and reserve teams before joining League Two club MK Dons on a free transfer at the end of the 2005–06 season. Manager Martin Allen described him as "an attacking left sided player with good pace". He made his debut in the League Cup, and came on as an 84th-minute substitute in the 2–1 league defeat at home to Chester City on 23 September 2006. Tillen then spent a month on loan to Thurrock of the Conference South, where he made two league appearances, before his contract with MK Dons was terminated in January 2007. He took time out of football before signing for Southern League club Thatcham Town, managed by his father, in December 2007.

On 14 May 2008, Tillen joined Icelandic club Fram, where his older brother Sam was already playing. He made his debut as a substitute in the Landsbankadeildin a match against IA Akranes on 20 May. He scored his first two goals for the club in the 3–0 victory over Fylkir on 22 July, and scored the winner against Valur at the Laugardalsvöllur. Tillen finished his first season with the club by helping them secure qualification for the 2009–10 UEFA Europa League after a win away at then top-of-the-table Keflavik.

== Personal life ==
In July 2018, Tillen was appointed Head of Football at Stephen Perse Foundation.
