= Gunnar Már Guðmundsson =

Icelandic footballer

Personal information
- Full name: Gunnar Már Guðmundsson
- Date of birth: 15 December 1983 (age 42)
- Place of birth: Iceland
- Height: 1.93 m (6 ft 4 in)
- Position: Midfielder

Team information
- Current team: Fjölnir (staff)

Senior career*
Years	Team	Apps	(Gls)
2001–2009	Fjölnir	151	(32)
2010–2011	FH	12	(3)
2011	Þór (loan)	20	(1)
2012–2013	ÍBV	26	(5)
2014–2017	Fjölnir	82	(11)

International career
2009	Iceland	1	(0)

Managerial career
- 2018–: Fjölnir (staff)
- * Club domestic league appearances and goals

Gunnar Már Guðmundsson (born 15 December 1983) is an Icelandic retired footballer, currently working for Fjölnir as a part of the staff.
