= 2020 4. deild karla =

4. deild karla
- Season: 2020
- Dates: 16 June 2020 –

The 2020 4. deild karla season was the 8th since its establishment. A total of 29 teams, were split into four groups of 7 or 8 teams based on a regional basis. The top two from each group will progress to the second phase of the campaign.

The season started on 16 June.

== League table ==
=== Group A ===
Pos	Team	Pld	W	D	L	GF	GA	GD	Pts	Qualification
1	ÍH	5	5	0	0	21	3	+18	15	Qualification to Second phase
2	Ýmir	6	4	0	2	33	8	+25	12	Qualification to Second phase
3	KFS	5	4	0	1	20	4	+16	12	
4	Léttir	7	4	0	3	13	22	−9	12	
5	GG	5	3	0	2	0	0	0	9	
6	Vatnaliljur	7	2	0	5	16	22	−6	6	
7	Uppsveitir	6	2	0	4	8	15	−7	6	
8	Afríka	7	0	0	7	2	39	−37	0	

Updated to match(es) played on 23 July 2020. Source: Soccerway
Rules for classification: 1) Points; 2) Goal difference; 3) Goals scored; 4) Head-to-head points; 5) Head-to-head goal difference; 6) Head-to-head goals scored; 7) Fewer away goals conceded; 8) Home goals scored; 9) Fewer home goals conceded; 10) Play-off; 11) Draw

=== Group B ===
Pos	Team	Pld	W	D	L	GF	GA	GD	Pts	Qualification
1	SR	4	4	0	0	17	7	+10	12	Qualification to Second phase
2	Stokkseyri	6	3	1	2	16	11	+5	10	Qualification to Second phase
3	KFR	4	2	2	0	12	4	+8	8	
4	Björninn	5	2	2	1	6	4	+2	8	
5	Kormákur/Hvöt	4	2	1	1	11	3	+8	7	
6	Álafoss	6	0	1	5	5	15	−10	1	
7	Snæfell	5	0	1	4	4	27	−23	1	
8	Skandinavía	0	0	0	0	0	0	0	0	

Updated to match(es) played on 23 July 2020. Source: Soccerway
Rules for classification: 1) Points; 2) Goal difference; 3) Goals scored; 4) Head-to-head points; 5) Head-to-head goal difference; 6) Head-to-head goals scored; 7) Fewer away goals conceded; 8) Home goals scored; 9) Fewer home goals conceded; 10) Play-off; 11) Draw

=== Group C ===
Pos	Team	Pld	W	D	L	GF	GA	GD	Pts	Qualification
1	KÁ Ásvellir	7	5	2	0	24	11	+13	17	Qualification to Second phase
2	Hamar	6	5	0	1	19	10	+9	15	Qualification to Second phase
3	Skallagrímur	7	4	1	2	18	9	+9	13	
4	Ísbjörninn	7	3	3	1	14	9	+5	12	
5	Samherjar	5	2	1	2	10	12	−2	7	
6	Berserkir	6	2	0	4	16	9	+7	6	
7	KFB	7	1	1	5	15	22	−7	4	
8	KM	7	0	0	7	4	38	−34	0	

Updated to match(es) played on 21 July 2020. Source: Soccerway
Rules for classification: 1) Points; 2) Goal difference; 3) Goals scored; 4) Head-to-head points; 5) Head-to-head goal difference; 6) Head-to-head goals scored; 7) Fewer away goals conceded; 8) Home goals scored; 9) Fewer home goals conceded; 10) Play-off; 11) Draw

=== Group D ===
Pos	Team	Pld	W	D	L	GF	GA	GD	Pts	Qualification
1	Kría	6	4	2	0	22	13	+9	14	Qualification to Second phase
2	KH	5	4	0	1	12	4	+8	12	Qualification to Second phase
3	Hvíti Riddarinn	6	4	0	2	17	11	+6	12	
4	Árborg	5	3	1	1	14	7	+7	10	
5	Smári	6	2	0	4	7	15	−8	6	
6	Mídas	6	1	2	3	13	17	−4	5	
7	KB	6	1	1	4	13	20	−7	4	
8	Hörður Í.	6	1	0	5	6	17	−11	3	

Updated to match(es) played on 19 July 2020. Source: Soccerway
Rules for classification: 1) Points; 2) Goal difference; 3) Goals scored; 4) Head-to-head points; 5) Head-to-head goal difference; 6) Head-to-head goals scored; 7) Fewer away goals conceded; 8) Home goals scored; 9) Fewer home goals conceded; 10) Play-off; 11) Draw

== Second phase ==
The top two from each group will enter this phase of the campaign.
