= Böðvar Böðvarsson =

Icelandic footballer (born 1995)

Personal information
- Date of birth: 9 April 1995 (age 31)
- Place of birth: Hafnarfjörður, Iceland
- Height: 1.86 m (6 ft 1 in)
- Position: Defender

Team information
- Current team: ÍA
- Number: 21

Youth career
- FH

Senior career*
Years	Team	Apps	(Gls)
2013–2018	FH	73	(1)
2016	→ FC Midtjylland (loan)	0	(0)
2018–2020	Jagiellonia Białystok	43	(0)
2021	Helsingborg	27	(0)
2022–2023	Trelleborg	50	(1)
2024–2025	FH	49	(2)
2026–	ÍA	26	(0)

International career
2014	Iceland U19	2	(0)
2015–2016	Iceland U21	11	(0)
2017–2019	Iceland	5	(0)
- * Club domestic league appearances and goals as of 1 November 2026

Böðvar Böðvarsson (born 9 April 1995) is an Icelandic professional footballer who plays as a defender for ÍA.

== Club career ==
On 5 February 2018, Böðvarsson signed a three-and-a-half-year contract with Jagiellonia Białystok.

He signed for Trelleborg in January 2022 after a year with Helsingborg.

== International career ==
Böðvar has been involved with the U-19 and U-21 teams, and made his senior team debut against China at the 2017 China Cup.

== Honours ==
FH

- Úrvalsdeild: 2015, 2016
- Icelandic Football League Cup: 2014
