= Sitnik (surname) =

Sitnik is a gender-neutral Slavic surname and toponym. Notable people with the surname include:

- Ksenia Sitnik (born 1995), Belarusian singer
- Marek Sitnik (born 1975), Polish wrestler
