= Hans Mathiesen =

Danish footballer (born 1983)

Personal information
- Full name: Hans Yoo Eun Suk Mathiesen
- Date of birth: 13 August 1983 (age 43)
- Position: Midfielder

Youth career
- –1998: FC Copenhagen
- 1999–2002: Brøndby IF

Senior career*
Years	Team	Apps	(Gls)
2002–2004	Brøndby IF		
2004–2005	AC Horsens		
2005–2007	Knattspyrnufélagið Fram	35	(1)
2008	Knattspyrnudeild Keflavík	20	(1)
2009–2010	Brønshøj Boldklub	6	(0)
2011	Stenløse BK		
2012–2013	SC Egedal		
- * Club domestic league appearances and goals

Hans Yoo Eun Suk Mathiesen (born 13 August 1983) is a Danish former footballer who played as a midfielder.

== Early life ==
Mathiesen was born in 1983. He grew up in Vesterbro, Denmark.

== Career ==
Mathiesen began his career at Danish club Brøndby IF. In 2004, he moved to another Danish side, AC Horsens. In 2005, he signed with Maldivian side Victory Sports Club where he played a key role in winning the 2005 President's Cup. He then joined Icelandic club Knattspyrnufélagið Fram, helping the team achieve promotion. In 2008, he transferred to another Icelandic club Knattspyrnudeild Keflavík.

In 2009, Mathiesen returned to Denmark, signing with Danish club Brønshøj Boldklub, where he again helped achieve promotion. In 2011, he joined Danish side Stenløse BK. before moving to SC Egedal in 2012.

== Style of play ==
Mathiesen mainly operated as a midfielder. He was known for his strength on the field.

== Personal life ==
Mathiesen is of South Korean descent.
