= Kristján Emilsson =

Icelandic footballer

Personal information
- Full name: Kristján Gauti Emilsson
- Date of birth: 26 April 1993 (age 33)
- Place of birth: Gothenburg, Sweden
- Height: 1.86 m (6 ft 1 in)
- Position: Forward

Youth career
- –2009: FH Hafnarfjörður
- 2009–2012: Liverpool

Senior career*
Years	Team	Apps	(Gls)
2009	FH Hafnarfjörður	3	(0)
2012–2014	FH Hafnarfjörður	34	(6)
2014–2016	NEC	14	(2)
2020	FH Hafnarfjörður	2	(0)

International career
2009	Iceland U-17	7	(5)
2009–2010	Iceland U-19	11	(2)
2013–2014	Iceland U-21	8	(1)
- * Club domestic league appearances and goals as of 12 June 2020 (UTC)

Kristján Gauti Emilsson (born 26 April 1993) is an Icelandic footballer who plays as a forward.

== Career ==
In 2009, Kristján made his debut for FH Hafnarfjörður in the highest Icelandic league. After an internship with Liverpool, he signed a three-year deal with the club and played in the youth academy until mid 2012. He returned to this former team where he made his real break through. On 23 July 2014, it was announced that Kristján had signed a three-year deal with Dutch Eerste Divisie side NEC. In January 2016, Emilsson ended his professional career because of personal reasons. On 12 June 2020 he signed for his boyhood club FH Hafnarfjörður after 4 years in retirement.

== International career ==
Kristján played for several Icelandic youth squads and was called for the national team in June 2014 but did not play for them.

== Honours ==
=== Club ===
NEC

- Eerste Divisie (1): 2014–15

FH

- Icelandic Men's Football League Cup (1): 2014
