= Stewart Beards =

English footballer

Personal information
- Date of birth: 15 August 1967 (age 59)
- Place of birth: Lichfield, England
- Position: Striker

Senior career*
Years	Team	Apps	(Gls)
1991–1992	RoPS	46	(25)
1993–1994	TPS	42	(15)
1995	Valur	15	(4)
- * Club domestic league appearances and goals

Stewart Beards (born 15 August 1967) is an English retired professional footballer.

Beards played four seasons in the Finnish Veikkausliiga for RoPS Rovaniemi and TPS Turku and one season in the Icelandic Úrvalsdeild for Valur.
