= Jean Stéphane Yao Yao =

Ivorian footballer

Jean-Stéphane Yao Yao
Personal information
- Full name: Jean-Stéphane Yao Yao
- Date of birth: 6 October 1990 (age 36)
- Place of birth: Bouaké, Ivory Coast
- Height: 1.61 m (5 ft 3 1/2 in)
- Position: Central midfielder

Team information
- Current team: CSS Richard-Toll
- Number: 14

Youth career
- Academie de Sefa

Senior career*
Years	Team	Apps	(Gls)
2008	Academie de Sefa	25	(10)
2009–2010	Lyn	3	(0)
2010–2011	Selfoss	7	(0)
2012–	CSS Richard-Toll	1	(0)
- * Club domestic league appearances and goals

Jean-Stéphane Yao Yao (born 6 October 1990 in Bouaké) is an Ivorian footballer, who currently plays as a midfielder for CSS Richard-Toll.

== Career ==
Yao began his career with the Academie de Sefa and went to Norway in January 2009, where he signed his first professional contract with FC Lyn Oslo and made his senior debut on 18 October 2009 against Strømsgodset IF, as a substitute in the 82nd minute. He played one more game in 2009, against Odd Grenland. After FC lyn Oslo went bankrupt, Yao Yao signed for Icelandic club UMF Selfoss. On 6. April 2012 left Europe and signed for Senegalese topclub CSS Richard-Toll.
