= Denys Sytnik =

Ukrainian footballer

Personal information
- Full name: Denys Leonidovych Sytnik
- Date of birth: 14 October 1986 (age 40)
- Place of birth: Kyiv, Ukrainian SSR
- Height: 1.78 m (5 ft 10 in)
- Position: Striker

Senior career*
Years	Team	Apps	(Gls)
2007	Komunalnyk Luhansk	13	(0)
2008	Svitanok		
2009	Hirnyk-Sport Horishni Plavni	16	(1)
2010–2011	Íþróttabandalag Vestmannaeyja	27	(6)
2012	FC Petrolul Ploiești	3	(0)
2013	Ungmennafélag Grindavíkur	7	(1)
2013	→ Knattspyrnufélagið Þróttur (loan)	4	(0)
2014	Tytan Donetsk	7	(0)
2014–2015	Marsaskala F.C.	22	(20)
2015	UMF Selfoss	14	(2)
2015–2016	Marsaskala F.C.	7	(7)
2016	Senglea Athletic F.C.	11	(1)
2016–2017	Luqa St. Andrew's F.C.	5	(3)
2017	Victoria Hotspurs F.C.		
Total		136	(41)
- * Club domestic league appearances and goals

Denys Leonidovych Sytnik (Ukrainian: Денис Леонідович Ситнік; born 14 October 1986) is a Ukrainian retired footballer who last played for Victoria Hotspurs in Malta.

== Career ==
Sytnik started his senior career with Komunalnyk Luhansk. In 2012, he signed for Petrolul Ploiești in the Romanian Liga I, where he made three league appearances and scored zero goals. After that, he played for Ungmennafélag Grindavíkur, Knattspyrnufélagið Þróttur, Tytan Donetsk, Marsaskala, Senglea Athletic, Luqa St. Andrew's, and Victoria Hotspurs before retiring.
