= Atli Viðar Björnsson =

Icelandic footballer

Atli Björnsson
Personal information
- Full name: Atli Viðar Björnsson
- Date of birth: 4 January 1980 (age 46)
- Place of birth: Iceland
- Height: 1.80 m (5 ft 11 in)
- Position: Striker

Team information
- Current team: FH

Senior career*
Years	Team	Apps	(Gls)
1997–2000	Dalvík	39	(23)
2001–2018	FH	264	(113)
2007	→ Fjölnir (loan)	17	(14)

International career
2009	Iceland	4	(0)
- * Club domestic league appearances and goals

Atli Viðar Björnsson (born 4 January 1980) is an Icelandic retired footballer, who mostly played for FH. Since joining FH in 2001, he played more than 300 matches for the club in all competitions. During the 2007 season, Atli spent four months on loan at 1. deild karla side Fjölnir where he scored 14 goals in 17 league appearances. He notably scored an equalising goal against English Premier League side Aston Villa in a 2008 UEFA Cup match, earning the Icelandic outfit a memorable draw away at Villa Park.

On 20 May 2015 Atli became the fourth player to score 100 goals in the Icelandic top division and only the second to score 100 goals for the same club. Atli's 100th goal was the opening goal against Íþróttabandalag Akraness and came in the 29th minute of the match.
