= Ólafur Páll Snorrason =

Icelandic footballer and coach

Personal information
- Date of birth: 22 April 1982 (age 44)
- Place of birth: Reykjavík, Iceland
- Height: 1.77 m (5 ft 10 in)
- Position: Right winger

Senior career*
Years	Team	Apps	(Gls)
1998	Valur	2	(0)
1998–2000	Bolton Wanderers	0	(0)
2000	Valur	5	(0)
2000–2001	Bolton Wanderers	0	(0)
2001	Fjölnir	4	(4)
2001–2002	Stjarnan	23	(7)
2003–2004	Fylkir	29	(2)
2005–2006	FH	28	(3)
2007	Fjölnir	6	(0)
2007	FH	2	(0)
2008	Fjölnir	19	(6)
2009	Valur	12	(3)
2009–2014	FH	77	(11)
2015–2016	Fjölnir	31	(0)
2017	FH	0	(0)
Total		258	(36)

International career
1996–1998	Iceland U17	25	(8)
1999	Iceland U19	6	(0)
2003	Iceland U21	1	(0)
2010	Iceland	1	(0)

Managerial career
- 2018: Fjölnir
- * Club domestic league appearances and goals

Ólafur Páll Snorrason (born 22 April 1982) is an Icelandic football coach and former player.

== Playing career ==
Born in Reykjavík, Ólafur played as a right winger for Valur, Bolton Wanderers, Fjölnir, Stjarnan, Fylkir and FH. When he joined English club Bolton Wanderers he became the fourth Icelandic player at the club.

After playing for them at youth level, he made one international appearance for Iceland in 2010.

== Coaching career ==
He left his role as Fjölnir manager in October 2018, after one season with the club.
