= Jonatan Neftalí =

Spanish footballer

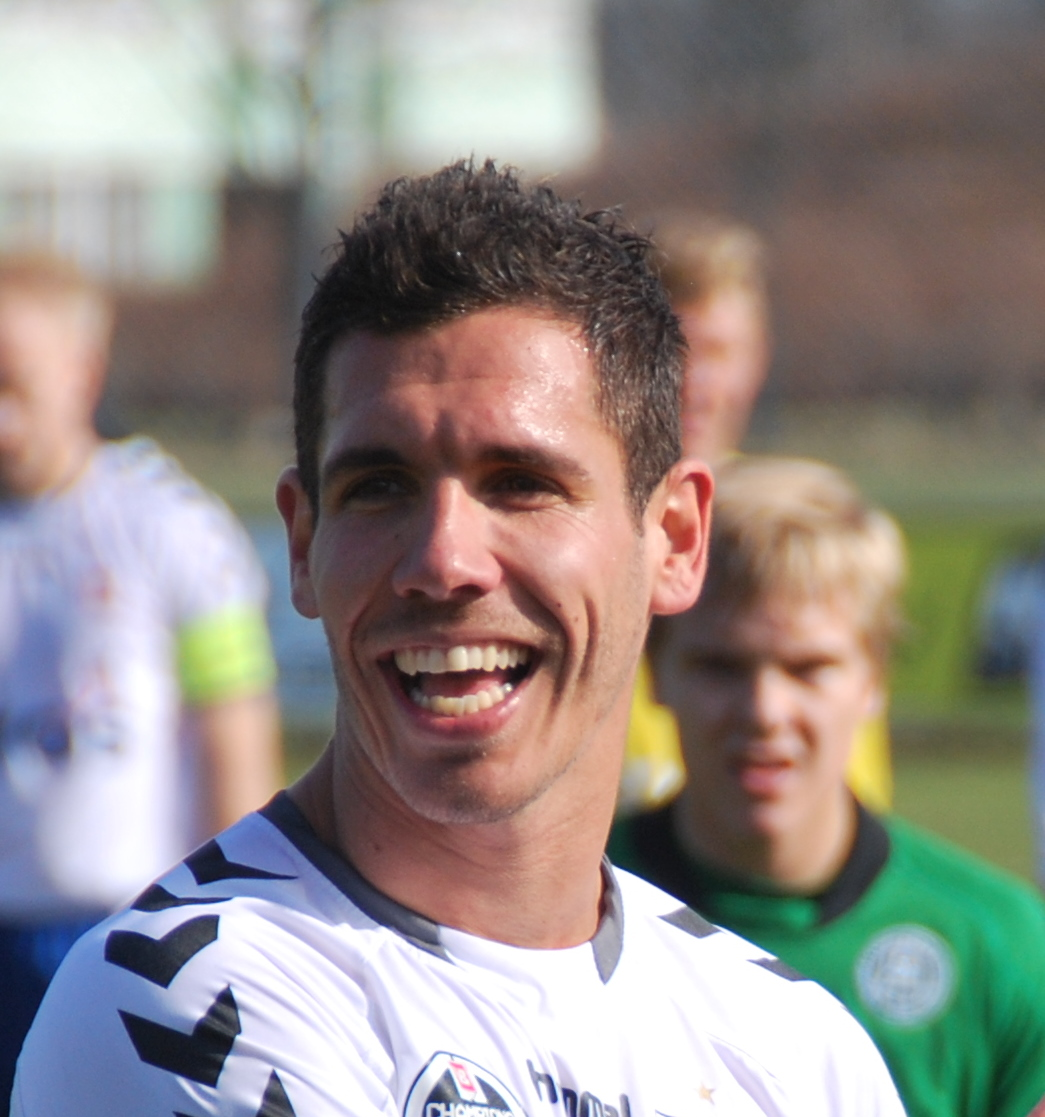
- Neftalí in 2012

Personal information
- Full name: Jonatan Neftalí Díez-González
- Date of birth: 26 August 1984 (age 42)
- Place of birth: Alicante, Spain
- Height: 1.90 m (6 ft 3 in)
- Position: Centre back

Team information
- Current team: Benidorm

Youth career
- 1993–1998: GCD Sant Joan d'Alacant
- 1998–2000: Hércules
- 2000–2003: Alicante

Senior career*
Years	Team	Apps	(Gls)
2003–2006	Alicante B	82	(5)
2005–2007	Alicante	2	(0)
2006–2007	→ Baza (loan)	21	(2)
2007–2008	Alcalá	27	(0)
2008–2010	Santa Eulàlia	67	(13)
2010–2011	Vejle Boldklub	29	(1)
2011–2013	Vejle Kolding	49	(3)
2013–2015	Vejle Boldklub	52	(0)
2015	Fjölnir	11	(0)
2016–2018	Jumilla	80	(6)
2018–2021	La Nucía	88	(4)
2021–2023	Torrellano	55	(3)
2023–	Benidorm	6	(0)
- * Club domestic league appearances and goals as of 13 October 2024

Jonatan Neftalí Díez-González (born 26 August 1984) is a Spanish footballer who plays for Benidorm as a central defender.

== Club career ==
Born in Alicante, Valencian Community, Neftalí played youth football in his native region, mainly with Hércules CF and Alicante CF. He made his debuts as a professional with the latter club during the 2004–05 season, being sent off in both of his Segunda División B appearances, against CF Badalona and Levante UD B.

Neftalí continued competing in the third level in the following three years, being relegated with CD Alcalá and PD Santa Eulàlia. After the latter campaign he went on trial with Grasshopper Club Zürich from Switzerland, but nothing came of it and he continued playing with Santa Eulalia in Tercera División.

In 2009–10, Neftalí scored a career-best ten goals. Subsequently, Vejle Boldklub manager Mats Gren – a former assistant with Grasshoppers – declared interest in signing the player, and a two-year contract was signed in late May 2010. In his first season he only missed one match as his team finished in third position, being the first place outside of the Danish Superliga promotion zone.

In March 2012, Neftalí extended his link with Vejle Boldklub Kolding (the club was renamed in 2011, and returned to its original denomination two years later), with the new deal running until the summer of 2015.
