= Daniel Ivanovski =

Macedonian football player (born 1983)

Personal information
- Full name: Daniel Ivanovski; Даниел Ивановски
- Date of birth: 27 June 1983 (age 43)
- Place of birth: Socialist Republic of Macedonia
- Height: 1.84 m (6 ft 1/2 in)
- Position: Defender

Team information
- Current team: Sölvesborgs GoIF

Senior career*
Years	Team	Apps	(Gls)
2001–2005	Sileks	78	(2)
2005–2006	Vardar	32	(0)
2006–2014	Mjällby	140	(1)
2015	Fjölnir	8	(0)
2015	Mjällby	11	(0)
2016	Fjölnir	10	(0)
2017	Mjällby	6	(0)
2018–	Sölvesborg	0	(0)

International career^{‡}
	Macedonia U21	12	(0)
2005	Macedonia (unofficial)	1	(0)
2005–2013	Macedonia (official)	4	(0)
- * Club domestic league appearances and goals ‡ National team caps and goals as of 30 December 2017

Daniel Ivanovski (Macedonian: Даниел Ивановски) (born 27 June 1983) is a Macedonian football player who plays for Sölvesborgs GoIF.

== Club career ==
Ivanovski began his career with Sileks before he then transferred to the most famous Macedonia club, FK Vardar. After a successful season, he moved to Sweden with Mjällby. Ivanovski plays as a central defender.

== International career ==
He made his senior debut for Macedonia in a November 2005 friendly match against Iran and has earned a total of 5 caps, scoring no goals. His final international was an August 2013 friendly against Bulgaria.
