= Sam Hewson =

English footballer (born 1988)

Personal information
- Full name: Sam Hewson
- Date of birth: 28 November 1988 (age 37)
- Place of birth: Farnworth, England
- Height: 5 ft 8 in (1.73 m)
- Position: Centre midfielder

Team information
- Current team: KFK Kópavogur

Youth career
- 1996–1998: AFC Bolton
- 1998–2008: Manchester United

Senior career*
Years	Team	Apps	(Gls)
2007–2010	Manchester United	0	(0)
2009	→ Hereford United (loan)	10	(3)
2010	→ Bury (loan)	7	(0)
2010–2011	Altrincham	19	(1)
2011–2013	Fram	51	(1)
2014–2016	FH	39	(1)
2017–2018	Grindavík	38	(6)
2019–2020	Fylkir	31	(2)
2021–2024	Þróttur Reykjavík	36	(18)
2024–	KFK Kópavogur	0	(0)

International career
2007	England U19	5	(0)
- * Club domestic league appearances and goals as of 10 November 2023

Sam Hewson (born 28 November 1988) is an English footballer who plays as a centre midfielder for KFK Kópavogur. He represented England at youth international level.

== Club career ==
=== Early career ===
Born in Farnworth, near Bolton, Hewson began his career at his local club, AFC Bolton, at the age of eight. He played two matches for the team before being spotted by Manchester United's youth scouts. He was then offered a place in the Manchester United Academy a year later, and started training with the club before he had even reached ten years of age.

Hewson started playing for the Manchester United under-17 team during the 2003–04 season, and scored in his second game. The following season, he only played one game for the under-18 side, in which he was substituted by Jamie Mullan. He signed a trainee contract with United in the summer of 2005, and became a regular in the under-18 team during the following season, playing in 28 matches including four in the FA Youth Cup. He also made his debut for the reserves on 26 September 2005, coming on as a substitute for Markus Neumayr against Newcastle United.

In 2006–07, Hewson was named as the captain of the Manchester United under-18 side, and made 26 appearances for the team, including eight appearances in the FA Youth Cup, his five goals helping United to the final, where they lost to Liverpool. The following season, he signed his first professional contract and became a regular in the reserve team, playing in 22 matches in all competitions. After being handed a first team squad number (43), he also received his first taste of first team action on 12 December 2007, when he was named as an unused substitute for United's final Champions League group stage match away to Roma. He also helped the reserve team to the finals of both the Manchester Senior Cup and the Lancashire Senior Cup, beating Bolton Wanderers in the former and Liverpool in the latter.

Despite being given a new first team squad number (33), he continued in the reserve team in 2008–09, and was ever-present in the side until January 2009, when he went on loan to Hereford United for three months. He made his Hereford debut in a 5–0 home win over Oldham Athletic on 17 January 2009, but was substituted in the 79th minute. He scored his first goal for Hereford in a 4–1 defeat to Stockport County. In the next game, he scored twice as Hereford beat Cheltenham 3–2. Hewson made a total of 10 appearances for Hereford before returning to Manchester United at the end of the season.

In February 2010, Hewson joined Bury on loan until the end of the 2009–10 season. Hewson returned to Manchester United at the end of the season, but his contract was not renewed and he was allowed to leave the club on a free transfer. In August 2010, he was given a trial by Grimsby Town and played in a reserves match against Lincoln City on 25 August.

=== Altrincham ===
He signed for Conference National club Altrincham in September 2010. Having made 19 Conference appearances for Altrincham, Hewson was released in March 2011.

=== Iceland ===
In August 2011, Hewson joined Icelandic club Fram. After two and a half seasons he joined FH where he won two Úrvalsdeild titles. In 2017 he moved to Grindavík.

On 11 October 2018, after two seasons with Grindavík, Hewson moved on to fellow top-flight Icelandic side Fylkir.

On 15 November 2020, Hewson agreed to join 1. deild karla side Þróttur Reykjavík as a player/coach, signing a four-year deal.

In April 2024, after three seasons with Þróttur, Hewson joined 3. deild karla side KFK Kópavogur.

== International career ==
In February 2007, Hewson made his debut for the England U19 squad for the friendly against Poland's U19 side. He has since made further appearances for the England U19 team, playing against Turkey and Austria, as well as playing in the 2007 UEFA European Under-19 Football Championship Elite Qualifying Group against Russia and the Czech Republic.

== Honours ==
=== Club ===
Fram

- Icelandic Cup winner: 2013

FH

- Icelandic League Cup winner: 2014
- Úrvalsdeild winner: 2015, 2016
- Icelandic Super Cup winner: 2016
