= Kristján Finnbogason =

Icelandic footballer

Personal information
- Full name: Kristján Finnbogi Finnbogason
- Date of birth: 8 May 1971 (age 55)
- Place of birth: Iceland
- Height: 1.85 m (6 ft 1 in)
- Position: Goalkeeper

Youth career
- Grótta

Senior career*
Years	Team	Apps	(Gls)
1988–1990	KR	3	(0)
1991–1993	ÍA Akranes	54	(0)
1994–1997	KR	71	(0)
1997–1998	Ayr United	9	(0)
1998–1999	KR	26	(0)
1999–2000	SK Lommel	1	(0)
2000–2008	KR	118	(0)
2009–2011	Grótta	60	(0)
2012–2013	Fylkir	3	(0)
2014–2016	FH	0	(0)
Total		345	(0)

International career^{‡}
1993–2005	Iceland	20	(0)
- * Club domestic league appearances and goals as of 23 March 2017 ‡ National team caps and goals as of 23 March 2017

Kristján Finnbogason (born 8 May 1971) is an Icelandic former footballer who played as a goalkeeper. He is best remembered for his time at Úrvalsdeild side KR.

== Honours ==
=== Club ===
FH

- Icelandic Premier Division: 2015, 2016

Grótta

- Icelandic Second Division: 2009

ÍA

- Icelandic Premier Division: 1992, 1993
- Icelandic Cup: 1993

KR

- Icelandic Premier Division: 1999, 2000, 2002, 2003
- Icelandic Cup: 1994, 1995, 1999, 2008
