= Eivinas Zagurskas =

Lithuanian footballer

Personal information
- Full name: Eivinas Zagurskas
- Date of birth: 9 September 1989 (age 37)
- Place of birth: Kėdainiai, Soviet Union
- Height: 1.88 m (6 ft 2 in)
- Position: Midfielder

Team information
- Current team: AFK Vilnius

Senior career*
Years	Team	Apps	(Gls)
2005	Vilkmergė Ukmergė		
2006	FC Vilnius-2		
2006	Vilkmergė Ukmergė		
2007–2008	FC Vilnius		
2009	Sūduva	21	(0)
2010	Nielba Wągrowiec	15	(1)
2010–2011	Bogdanka Łęczna	16	(1)
2010–2011	Bogdanka Łęczna II	7	(0)
2011–2012	Wisła Płock	18	(1)
2013	Paniliakos	9	(0)
2013–2014	Žalgiris	22	(0)
2014–2015	Banga Gargždai	11	(1)
2015–2017	Egersunds IK	32	(4)
2017	Víkingur Ólafsvík	8	(1)
2018	Snæfell	10	(3)
2018	Sindri	7	(1)
2019	Snæfell	2	(0)
2019	FK Vilnius (2019)	6	(3)
2021–	AFK Vilnius		

International career
	Lithuania U17	3	(0)
	Lithuania U19	3	(0)
2009–2010	Lithuania U21	9	(2)
2011	Lithuania B	1	(1)
- * Club domestic league appearances and goals as of 9 September 2024

Eivinas Zagurskas (born 9 September 1989) is a Lithuanian professional footballer who plays as a midfielder for AFK Vilnius.

== Career ==
=== Club ===
In the summer of 2010, he joined Bogdanka Łęczna on a one-year contract.

In July 2011, he signed a contract with Wisła Płock.

In January 2013, he signed a contract with Paniliakos.

=== International ===
He was also a part of the Lithuania under-21 team.

== Honours ==
Sūduva

- Lithuanian Cup: 2008–09

Žalgiris

- A Lyga: 2013
- Lithuanian Cup: 2013–14
