= Hólmar Örn Rúnarsson =

Icelandic footballer

Personal information
- Full name: Hólmar Örn Rúnarsson
- Date of birth: 10 December 1981 (age 44)
- Place of birth: Sandgerði, Sólheimar
- Height: 1.76 m (5 ft 9 in)
- Position: Midfielder

Youth career
- Keflavík

Senior career*
Years	Team	Apps	(Gls)
2000–2006	Keflavík	104	(16)
2006–2008	Silkeborg	44	(4)
2008–2010	Keflavík	55	(6)
2010–2014	FH	43	(8)
2014–2018	Keflavík	64	(8)
2019–2021	Víðir	2	(0)
2021–2023	Njarðkvík	1	(0)

International career
2003	Iceland U21	1	(0)
- * Club domestic league appearances and goals as of 16:30, 12 June 2026 (UTC)

Hólmar Örn Rúnarsson (born 10 December 1981) is an Icelandic former footballer who played as a midfielder. He has been selected for the Iceland national football team four times without making an appearance.

== Career ==
Rúnarsson began his career as a youth player with Keflavík, before moving on to play for their senior team. In 2006, he moved to Danish club Silkeborg, where he spent two years before returning to Keflavík in 2008. He left the side in 2010, signing for Úrvalsdeild champions FH, where he spent four years. In 2014, he signed for Keflavík for a third time on a two-year contract.

In 2019, Rúnarsson joined Víðir.
