= 2014 Icelandic Men's Football League Cup =

Deildarbikar karla

Tournament details
- Country: Iceland
- Dates: 14 February – 25 April
- Teams: 24

Final positions
- Champions: FH (6th title)
- Runners-up: Breiðablik

Tournament statistics
- Matches played: 91
- Goals scored: 317 (3.48 per match)
- Top goal scorer: Ingimundur Níels Óskarsson (9)

The 2014 Icelandic Men's Football League Cup was the 19th season of the Icelandic Men's League Cup, a pre-season professional football competition in Iceland. The competition started on 15 February 2014 and concluded on 25 April 2014. Breiðablik were the reigning champions, having won their first League Cup last year.

The 24 teams from the Úrvalsdeild karla and 1. deild karla were divided into 3 groups of 8 teams. Every team played every other team of its group once, home, away or on a neutral ground for a total of 7 games. Each group winner, each runner-up and the two best third-place finishes entered the quarter-finals.

== Group stage ==
The games will be played from 15 February to 12 April 2014.

=== Group 1 ===
Pos	Team	Pld	W	D	L	GF	GA	GD	Pts	Qualification	KR	BRE	KEF	ÍA	GRI	FRA	BÍB	AFT
1	KR (Q)	7	5	1	1	19	6	+13	16	Qualification to the Quarter-finals	—	—	—	3–0	5–0	3–4	4–0	2–1
2	Breiðablik (Q)	7	4	3	0	15	8	+7	15	Qualification to the Quarter-finals	0–0	—	—	—	2–1	4–3	1–1	4–0
3	Keflavík (Q)	7	3	2	2	15	12	+3	11	Qualification to the Quarter-finals	1–2	1–2	—	—	2–0	—	—	3–1
4	ÍA	7	2	4	1	11	10	+1	10		—	2–2	4–4	—	—	—	3–0	1–1
5	Grindavík	7	3	1	3	8	11	−3	10		—	—	—	0–0	—	—	2–1	—
6	Fram	7	2	0	5	12	17	−5	6		—	—	2–3	0–1	0–2	—	0–3 (Note: Fram played with an ineligible player, the original result was 3−0.)	3–1
7	BÍ/Bolungarvík	7	1	2	4	8	14	−6	5		—	—	1–1	—	—	—	—	—
8	Afturelding	7	1	1	5	8	18	−10	4		—	—	—	—	1–3	—	3–2	—

Source: ksi.is (in Icelandic)
Rules for classification: 1) points; 2) goal difference; 3) number of goals scored.
(Q) Qualified for the phase indicated

=== Group 2 ===
Pos	Team	Pld	W	D	L	GF	GA	GD	Pts	Qualification	ÞÓR	FH	FYL	FJÖ	KAK	LRE	ÞRÓ	HK
1	Þór A. (Q)	7	5	2	0	12	3	+9	17	Qualification to the Quarter-finals	—	1–0	—	2–1	2–1	—	0–0	—
2	FH (Q)	7	5	0	2	20	7	+13	15	Qualification to the Quarter-finals	—	—	—	—	3–0	—	—	—
3	Fylkir (Q)	7	3	2	2	15	13	+2	11	Qualification to the Quarter-finals	1–1	1–3	—	4–3	—	1–1	—	—
4	Fjölnir	7	3	1	3	14	10	+4	10		—	3–0 (Note: FH played with an ineligible player, the original result was 2−3.)	—	—	1–1	—	1–0	3–0
5	KA	7	3	1	3	11	11	0	10		—	—	4–0	—	—	2–1	—	3–2
6	Leiknir R.	7	2	2	3	11	17	−6	8		0–5	1–3	—	3–2	—	—	3–2	—
7	Þróttur Reykjavík	7	1	1	5	7	12	−5	4		—	0–1	0–3	—	2–0	—	—	—
8	HK	7	1	1	5	10	27	−17	4		0–1	1–10	1–5	—	—	2–2	4–3	—

Source: ksi.is (in Icelandic)
Rules for classification: 1) points; 2) goal difference; 3) number of goals scored.
(Q) Qualified for the phase indicated

=== Group 3 ===
Pos	Team	Pld	W	D	L	GF	GA	GD	Pts	Qualification	STJ	VÍK	ÍBV	VAL	SEL	KV	VÓL	HAU
1	Stjarnan (Q)	7	5	2	0	18	6	+12	17	Qualification to the Quarter-finals	—	—	—	2–1	3–2	—	4–0	5–0
2	Víkingur Reykjavík (Q)	7	5	2	0	15	5	+10	17	Qualification to the Quarter-finals	2–2	—	0–0	1–0	4–0	—	—	2–1
3	ÍBV	7	3	2	2	7	5	+2	11		0–1	—	—	—	—	—	—	—
4	Valur	7	3	1	3	15	10	+5	10		—	—	0–1	—	—	5–2	3–2	4–0
5	Selfoss	7	2	1	4	10	15	−5	7		—	—	0–1	2–2	—	—	1–3	—
6	KV	7	2	1	4	9	20	−11	7		1–1	0–3 (Note: KV played with an ineligible player, the original result was 2−2.)	1–3	—	2–0	—	2–1	—
7	Víkingur Ólafsvík	7	2	0	5	10	17	−7	6		—	2–3	2–1	—	1–3	—	—	—
8	Haukar	7	1	1	5	12	18	−6	4		—	—	1–1	—	2–3	7–1	1–2	—

Source: ksi.is (in Icelandic)
Rules for classification: 1) points; 2) goal difference; 3) number of goals scored.
(Q) Qualified for the phase indicated

== Knockout stage ==
The top two teams of each group and the two best third-place entered the quarterfinals.

=== Quarter-finals ===
The games were played on 16 and 17 April.

Team 1	Score	Team 2
Þór	2−2 (4−3 p)	Keflavík
Breiðablik	1−0	Víkingur R.
Stjarnan	1−2	FH
KR	3−1	Fylkir

=== Semi-finals ===
The games were played on 21 April.

Team 1	Score	Team 2
KR	1−1 (2−4 p)	FH
Þór	1−2	Breiðablik

=== Final ===
25 April 2014
19:00 GMT

Breiðablik	1−4	FH
Eyjólfsson 78'	Report	Óskarsson 21', 64', 86'; Rúnarsson 90+3'

Samsung völlurinn, Garðabær
Attendance: 489
Referee: Vilhjálmur Alvar Þórarinsson

== Top goalscorers ==
Rank	Player	Team	Goals
1	(Iceland) Ingimundur Níels Óskarsson	FH	9
2	(Iceland) Kristján Gauti Emilsson	FH	7
3	(Iceland) Veigar Páll Gunnarsson	Stjarnan	6
4	(Iceland) Aron Bjarki Jósepsson	KR	5
4	(Iceland) Árni Vilhjálmsson	Breiðablik	5
4	(Iceland) Emil Pálsson	FH	5
4	(Iceland) Ragnar Leósson	Fjölnir	5
4	(Iceland) Hilmar Árni Halldórsson	Leiknir	5
4	(Iceland) Andri Björn Sigurðsson	Þróttur	5
