= 2013 Icelandic Cup =

Borgunarbikar

Tournament details
- Country: Iceland
- Teams: 72

Final positions
- Champions: Fram (8th title)
- Runners-up: Stjarnan

Tournament statistics
- Matches played: 71
- Goals scored: 320 (4.51 per match)

The 2013 Icelandic Cup, also known as the Borgunarbikar for sponsorship reasons, was the 54th edition of the Icelandic national football cup. It began with the first round on 30 April 2013 and ended on 17 August 2013. The final was played at Laugardalsvöllur, the Icelandic national stadium, and was won by Fram, who beat Stjarnan in a penalty shoot-out after the match had finished 3–3. It was Fram's eighth Icelandic Cup triumph, and their first since 1989.

== First round ==
The First Round consisted of 38 teams from the lower Icelandic levels and 6 clubs from the 2. deild karla. The 20 matches were played between 30 April and 4 May 2013. Two teams, Stál-úlfur and Fjarðabyggð, were given walkovers after their opponents withdrew from the competition.

30 April 2013	Gnúpverjar	1–9	Elliði	Víkingsvöllur, Reykjavík
21:00	Einar Sigurðsson 59'	Report	Bergur Logi Lúðvíksson 32'; Davíð Teitsson 33', 55', 61', 88', 90'; Jóhann Andri Kristjánsson 34', 64'; Guðni Rúnar Ólafsson 86'	Attendance: 7 Referee: Garðar Örn Hinriksson

1 May 2013	Berserkir	6–2	KFS	Víkingsvöllur, Reykjavík
16:00	Marteinn Briem 13'; Gunnar Hauksson 18', 44'; Ólafur Guðmundsson 33'; Arnar Þórarinsson 51'; Daníel Freyr Sigurðarson 71'	Report	Sæþór Jóhannesson 54'; Aron Hugi Helgason 80'	Attendance: 30; Referee: Bryngeir Valdimarsson

3 May 2013	Njarðvík	8–0	Mídas	Njarðvíkurvöllur, Njarðvík
19:00	Garðar Sigurðsson 20', 24', 58', 85', 88'; Lukasz Malesa 56'; EyÞór Ingi Einarsson 65'; Guðmundur Steinarsson 69'	Report		Referee: Sigurður Óli Þórleifsson

3 May 2013	KFG	1–5	Skínandi	Stjörnuvöllur, Garðabær
19:00	Arnar Þór Ingason 65'	Report	Atli Freyr Ottesen Pálsson 26', 43', 62'; Aron Rúnarsson Heiðdal 36'; Jón Arnar Barðdal 52'	Referee: Þorvaldur Árnason

3 May 2013	Grótta	3–0	KH	Gróttuvöllur, Seltjarnarnes
19:00	Enok Eiðsson 9', 52'; Pétur Theódór Árnason 44' (pen.)	Report		Referee: Örvar Sær Gíslason

3 May 2013	Hvíti riddarinn	0–3	Árborg	Varmárvöllur, Mosfellsbær
19:00		Report	Guðmundur Sigurðsson 29', 34', 42'	Attendance: 20; Referee: Bryngeir Valdimarsson

3 May 2013	ÍH	1–2	Álftanes	Kórinn, Kópavogur
20:00	Haukar Ólafsson 86'	Report	Ingólfur Örn Ingólfsson 68'; Andri Janusson 85'	Referee: Estanislao Plantada Siurans

3 May 2013	Þróttur V.	3–2	Víðir	Reykjaneshöllin, Reykjanesbær
21:00	Reynir Þór Valsson 3', 90+3'; Colin Thompson 82'	Report	Ómar Þröstur Hjaltason 35'; Tómas Pálmason 73' (pen.)	Attendance: 100; Referee: Jóhann Atli Hafliðason

4 May 2013	Afríka	2–5 (a.e.t.)	Ýmir	Leiknisvöllur, Reykjavík
14:00	Anbari Faycal 1'; Baba Bangoura 11' (pen.)	Report	Eyjólfur Örn Eyjólfsson 23'; Andri Valgeirsson 44'; Sigurður Víðisson 94'; Stefán Örn Stefánsson 105'; Hreinn Bergs 114' (pen.)	Referee: Aðalbjörn Heiðar Þorsteinsson

4 May 2013	KFR	3–2	Léttir	SS-völlurinn, Hvolsvöllur
14:00	Guðmundur Garðar Sigfússon 7'; Reynir Óskarsson 23'; Jóhann Guðmundsson 33'	Report	Bjarki Þór Steinarsson 57', 66'	Referee: Karel Fannar Sveinbjörnsson

4 May 2013	Leiknir F.	0–3	Einherji	Fellavöllur, Egilsstaðir
14:00		Report	Sigurður Donys Sigurðsson 2', 67'; Víglundur Páll Einarsson 31'	Referee: Húnbogi Sólon Gunnþórsson

4 May 2013	Ísbjörninn	1–6	Hamar	Kórinn, Kópavogur
14:00	Bjarni Jóhannsson 14'	Report	Kristján Valur Sigurjónsson 39'; Eiríkur Raphael Elvy 43'; Óskar Smári Haraldsson 62'; Ingþór Björgvinsson 64'; Atli Hjaltested 80'; Ingimar Guðmundsson 86'	Referee: Geir Eggertsson

4 May 2013	Reynir S.	11–1	Vatnaliljur	N1-völlurinn, Sandgerði
14:00	Hjörleifur Þórðarson 18'; Hörður Ingþór Harðarson 25' (o.g.); Guðmundur Gísli Gunnarsson 42'; Ásgeir Harðarson 44' (o.g.); Gunnar Skaptason 45' (o.g.); Birkir Freyr Sigurðsson 58'; Gunnar Wigelund 64', 80', 84', 86'; Pétur Þór Jaidee 66'	Report	Theódór Óskarsson 34'	Attendance: 15; Referee: Ingi Björn Ágústsson

4 May 2013	Ægir	1–0	KB	Þorlákshafnarvöllur, Þorlákshöfn
14:00	Aco Pandurević 46'	Report		Attendance: 50; Referee: Gunnar Helgason

4 May 2013	Kóngarnir	1−4	Grundarfjörður	Framvöllur, Reykjavík
14:00	Guðjón Þór Valsson 22'	Report	Dalibor Lazić 27'; Ingólfur Örn Kristjánsson 48', 61', 65'	Attendance: 49; Referee: Snorri Páll Einarsson

4 May 2013	Snæfell/Geislinn	1–5	Ármann	Stykkishólmsvöllur, Stykkishólmur
14:00	Stefán Þór Halldórsson 86'	Report	Jón Andri Helgason 29'; Eiríkur Gunnar Helgason 36', 40'; Hans Sævar Sævarsson 45'; Baldvin Örn Ólafsson 47'	Referee: Ívar Orri Kristjánsson

4 May 2013	Kormákur/Hvöt	0–9	Magni	Boginn, Akureyri
15:00		Report	Hreggviður Heiðberg Gunnarsson 10', 45', 66'; Kristján Sindri Gunnarsson 29', 67'; Garðar Stefán Sigurgeirsson 36'; Lars Óli Jessen 51', 54'; Siniša Pavlica 90'	Attendance: 50; Referee: Valdimar Pálsson

4 May 2013	Augnablik	5–0	Kári	Kórinn, Kópavogur
16:30	Höskuldur Gunnlaugsson 26'; Jón Viðar Guðmundsson 28'; Gísli Eyjólfsson 65', 81'; Hörður Snævar Jónsson 86'	Report		Referee: Erlendur Eiríksson

4 May 2013	Hómer	4–2	Stokkseyri	Framvöllur, Reykjavík
16:30	Karl Magnús Grönvold 1', 25'; Óskar Þór Hilmarsson 30', 44'	Report	Valdimar Gylfason 51'; Bjarki Gylfason 86'	Attendance: 9 Referee: Sigurður Schram

4 May 2013	Dalvík/Reynir	6–0	Hamrarnir	Boginn, Akureyri
17:15	Ingólfur Árnason 48'; Viktor Daði Sævaldsson 73'; Pétur Heiðar Kristjánsson 74', 86'; Kristján Steinn Magnússon 81'; Viktor Már Jónasson 88'	Report		Referee: Jan Eric Jessen

== Second round ==
The Second Round consisted of the 20 winning teams of the First Round, Stál-úlfur and Fjarðabyggð who had walkovers in the First Round, the remaining 6 teams from the 2. deild karla and the 12 teams from the 1. deild karla. The 20 matches were played between 10 May and 14 May 2013.

10 May 2013	Árborg	1–3	Ármann	Selfossvöllur, Selfoss
19:00	Hafþór Ingi Ragnarsson 19'	Report	Stefan Mickael Sverisson 12'; Jón Andri Helgason 18'; Baldvin Örn Ólafsson 67'	Attendance: 31; Referee: Ívar Orri Kristjánsson

12 May 2013	BÍ/Bolungarvík	7–1	Augnablik	Torfnesvöllur, Ísafjörður
14:30	Andri Rúnar Bjarnason 2'; Ben Everson 5', 90'; Nigel Quashie 12'; Sigurgeir Sveinn Gíslason 17'; Dennis Rasmussen Nielsen 67'; Guðbrandur Snær Benediktsson 83' (o.g.)	Report	Daníel Rögnvaldsson 89'	Referee: Bryngeir Valdimarsson

13 May 2013	KA	1–2	Magni	Boginn, Akureyri
18:00	Bjarki Baldvinsson 84'	Report	Hreggviður Heiðberg Gunnarsson 3'; Lars Oli Jessen 26'	Attendance: 220; Referee: Valdimar Pálsson

13 May 2013	ÍR	2–5	Selfoss	Hertzvöllurinn, Reykjavík
19:00	Arnor Björnsson 85', 86'	Report	Ingi Rafn Ingibergsson 19', 57'; Joseph David Yoffe 27', 79', 87'	Referee: Örvar Sær Gíslason

13 May 2013	KV	2–1	Fjölnir	KR-völlur, Reykjavík
19:00	Brynjar Orri Bjarnason 41'; Davíð Steinn Sigurðarson 89'	Report	Aron Sigurðarson 64' (pen.)	Referee: Estanislao Plantada Siurans

13 May 2013	Þróttur R.	4–2	Afturelding	Gervigrasvöllur Laugardals, Reykjavík
19:00	Halldór Arnar Hilmisson 7'; Karl Brynjar Björnsson 45'; Aron Bjarnason 74'; Andri Björn Sigurðsson 83'	Report	Elvar Ingi Vignisson 12'; Wentzel Steinarr Kamban 47'	Attendance: 111; Referee: Valgeir Valgeirsson

13 May 2013	Leiknir R.	6–0	Njarðvík	Leiknisvöllur, Reykjavík
19:00	Hilmar Árni Halldórsson 11', 59', 77'; Aron Daníelsson 37'; Dánjal á Lakjuni 46'; Ólafur Hrannar Kristjánsson 90'	Report		Attendance: 100; Referee: Gunnar Helgason

13 May 2013	Víkingur R.	2–0	Haukar	Víkingsvöllur, Reykjavík
19:00	Hjörtur Július Hjartarson 37'; Igor Taskovic 79' (pen.)	Report		Referee: Garðar Örn Hinriksson

13 May 2013	Ýmir	3–1	KFR	Fagrilundur, Kópavogur
19:00	Hreinn Bergs 3', 16'; Stefán Örn Stefánsson 21'	Report	Hjörvar Sigurðsson 32' (pen.)	Referee: Oddur Helgi Guðmundsson

13 May 2013	Stál-úlfur	1–2	Grótta	Kórinn, Kópavogur
19:00	Ruben Filipe 10'	Report	Pétur Theódór Árnason 22'; Jónmundur Grétarsson 54'	Attendance: 25; Referee: Karel Fannar Sveinbjörnsson

13 May 2013	Skínandi	1–2	HK	Stjörnuvöllur, Garðabær
20:00	Þórhallur Kári Knútsson 45'	Report	Guðmundur Atli Steinþórsson 43' (pen.); Ásgeir Marteinsson 68'	Referee: Geir Eggertsson

13 May 2013	KF	1–3	Völsungur	Boginn, Akureyri
20:30	Nenad Zivanovic 38' (pen.)	Report	Ásgeir Sigurgeirsson 40', 90'; Gunnar Sigurður Jósteinsson 87'	Attendance: 250; Referee: Vilhelm Adolfsson

14 May 2013	Þróttur V.	3–0	Hómer	Vogavöllur, Vogar
19:00	Reynir Þór Valsson 12'; Bragi Bergmann Ríkharðsson 20'; Arnar Freyr Smárason 30' (pen.)	Report		Referee: Svanlaugur Þorsteinsson

14 May 2013	Álftanes	3–0	Elliði	Bessastaðavöllur, Álftanes
19:00	Guðbjörn Alexander Sæmundsson 8', 25'; Andri Janusson 62'	Report		Referee: Einar Freyr Jónsson

14 May 2013	Berserkir	1–2	Hamar	Víkingsvöllur, Reykjavík
19:00	Ólafur Guðmundsson 56'	Report	Hermann Ágúst Björnsson 45'; Atli Hjaltested 90'	Referee: Aðalbjörn Heiðar Þorsteinsson

14 May 2013	Reynir S.	7–0	Grundarfjörður	Sandgerðisvöllur, Sandgerði
19:00	Guðmundur Gísli Gunnarsson 18'; Gunnar Wigelund 23', 32', 44'; Pétur Þór Jaidee 36'; Egill Jóhansson 61'; Deividas Leskys 78'	Report		Attendance: 32; Referee: Bryngeir Valdimarsson

14 May 2013	Ægir	3–4	Grindavík	Þorlákshafnarvöllur, Þorlákshöfn
19:00	Haukur Már Ólafsson 31', 75'; Gunnar Marteinsson 68'	Report	Stefán Þór Pálsson 6', 50'; Daníel Leó Grétarsson 30'; Juraj Grizelj 36' (pen.)	Referee: Leiknir Ágústsson

14 May 2013	Sindri	3–3 (a.e.t.) (4–3 p)	Fjarðabyggð	Sindravellir, Höfn
19:00	Fijad Mehanovic 43'; Hilmar Þór Kárason 55'; Anel Besilja 88'	Report	Fannar Árnason 5'; Víkingur Pálmason 20'; Tadas Jocys 90'	Referee: Jóhann Óskar Þórólfsson

14 May 2013	Dalvík/Reynir	1–5	Tindastóll	Boginn, Akureyri
20:00	Kristján Steinn Magnússon 83'	Report	Christopher Tsonis 27', 59'; Elvar Páll Sigurðsson 43'; Steven Beattie 48'; Atli Arnarson 74'	Referee: Jan Eric Jessen

14 May 2013	Höttur	3–0	Einherji	Fellavöllur, Egilsstaðir
20:10	Jonathan Taylor 9'; Högni Helgason 15', 56'	Report		Attendance: 50; Referee: Guðmundur Arnar Guðmundsson

== Third round ==
The Third Round consisted of the 20 winning teams of the Second Round and the 12 teams from the Úrvalsdeild. The 16 matches were played on 29 May and 30 May 2013.

29 May 2013	Sindri	4–0	Ýmir	Sindravellir, Höfn
18:00	Hilmar Þór Kárason 5'; Atli Haraldsson 11'; Þorsteinn Jóhannsson 34'; Fijad Mehanović 75'	Report		Referee: Valgeir Valgeirsson

29 May 2013	Þróttur R.	1–5	ÍBV	Valbjarnarvöllur, Reykjavík
18:00	Andri Björn Sigurðsson 53'	Report	Aaron Spear 23'; Gunnar Már Guðmundsson 81', 87'; Ian Jeffs 85'; Víðir Þorvarðarson 90+3'	Referee: Magnús Þórisson

29 May 2013	Fylkir	2–0	Völsungur	Fylkisvöllur, Reykjavík
18:15	Viðar Örn Kjartansson 82', 90'	Report		Referee: Vilhjálmur Alvar Þórarinsson

29 May 2013	Leiknir R.	3–0	Ármann	Leiknisvöllur, Reykjavík
19:15	Sævar Freyr Alexandersson 43'; Ólafur Hrannar Kristjánsson 68'; Hilmar Árni Halldórsson 90+1'	Report		Attendance: 200; Referee: Aðalbjörn Heiðar Þorsteinsson

29 May 2013	ÍA	2–1 (a.e.t.)	Selfoss	Akranesvöllur, Akranes
19:15	Jóhannes Karl Guðjónsson 81'; Garðar Bergmann Gunnlaugsson 108'	Report	Sigurður Eyberg Guðlaugsson 87'	Attendance: 706; Referee: Guðmundur Ársæll Guðmundsson

29 May 2013	Grótta	3–1	Höttur	Gróttuvöllur, Seltjarnarnes
19:15	Grímur Björn Grímsson 12'; Pétur Theódór Árnason 63'; Hjörvar Hermannsson 86'	Report	Högni Helgason 24'	Attendance: 62; Referee: Jan Eric Jessen

29 May 2013	Hamar	1–2	Tindastóll	Grýluvöllur, Hveragerði
19:15	Atli Hjaltested 90+1'	Report	Atli Arnarson 51', 62'	Referee: Valdimar Pálsson

29 May 2013	BÍ/Bolungarvík	3–3 (a.e.t.) (3–1 p)	Reynir S.	Torfnesvöllur, Ísafjörður
19:15	Alexander Veigar Þórarinsson 72', 95'; Max Touloute 77'	Report	Gunnar Wigelund 67'; Björn Ingvar Björnsson 90+2'; Pétur Þór Jaidee 107' (pen.)	Referee: Halldór Breiðfjörð Jóhannsson
	Penalties
	Nigel Quashie (penalty scored); Ben Everson (penalty scored); Dennis Rasmussen Nielsen (penalty scored)		Egill Jóhannsson (penalty missed); Björn Ingvar Björnsson (penalty missed); Ásgrímur Gunnarsson (penalty scored); Hannes Kristinn Kristinnsson (penalty missed)

29 May 2013	Magni	2–0	Þróttur V.	Boginn, Akureyri
19:15	Agnar Darri Sverrisson 38'; Hreggviður Heiðberg Gunnarsson 43'	Report		Referee: Vilhelm Adolfsson

29 May 2013	KV	0–0 (a.e.t.) (6–7 p)	Víkingur R.	KR-völlur, Reykjavík
19:15		Report		Attendance: 250; Referee: Þóroddur Hjaltalín
	Penalties
	Tómas Agnarsson (penalty scored); Davíð Birgisson (penalty missed); Einar Bjarni Ómarsson (penalty scored); Vilhjálmur Darri Einarsson (penalty scored); Atli Jónasson (penalty scored); Halldór Bogason (penalty scored); Eyjólfur Fannar Eyjólfsson (penalty scored); Skúli Jónsson (penalty missed)		Kristinn Jóhannes Magnússon (penalty scored); Marko Pavlov (penalty scored); Ágúst Freyr Hallsson (penalty missed); Igor Tasković (penalty scored); Axel Kári Vignisson (penalty scored); Ingvar Þór Kale (penalty scored); Tómas Ingi Urbančić (penalty scored); Stefán Bjarni Hjaltested (penalty scored)

30 May 2013	Álftanes	1–2	Vikingur Ó.	Bessastaðavöllur, Álftanes
19:15	Guðbjörn Alexander Sæmundsson 24' (pen.)	Report	Stefán Ingi Björnsson 20' (o.g.); Guðmundur Steinn Hafsteinsson 71'	Attendance: Leiknir Ágústsson

30 May 2013	KR	3–1	Grindavík	KR-völlur, Reykjavík
19:15	Atli Sigurjónsson 30'; Baldur Sigurðsson 69'; Jónas Guðni Sævarsson 76'	Report	Jósef Kristinn Jósefsson 63'	Referee: Garðar Örn Hinriksson

30 May 2013	HK	0–4	Breiðablik	Kópavogsvöllur, Kópavogur
19:15		Report	Sverrir Ingi Ingason 30' (pen.); Nichlas Rohde 54'; Árni Vilhjálmsson 83'; Ellert Hreinsson 90'	Attendance: 1,360; Referee: Þorvaldur Árnason

30 May 2013	Þór A.	3–3 (a.e.t.) (3–4 p)	Stjarnan	Þórsvöllur, Akureyri
19:15	Jóhann Helgi Hannesson 27', 90+2'; Jóhann Þórhallsson 117' (pen.)	Report	Halldór Orri Björnsson 23'; Baldvin Sturluson 60'; Veigar Páll Gunnarsson 95'	Attendance: 581; Referee: Gunnar Jarl Jónsson
	Penalties
	Jóhann Þórhallsson (penalty missed); Mark Tubæk (penalty missed); Chukwudi Chijindu (penalty scored); Jóhann Helgi Hannesson (penalty scored); Sveinn Elías Jónsson (penalty scored); Srdjan Rajkovic (penalty missed)		Ólafur Karl Finsen (penalty scored); Veigar Páll Gunnarsson (penalty scored); Halldór Orri Björnsson (penalty scored); Martin Rauschenberg (penalty missed); Atli Jóhannsson (penalty missed); Baldvin Sturluson (penalty scored)

30 May 2013	FH	3–2	Keflavík	Kaplakrikavöllur, Hafnarfjörður
19:15	Atli Viðar Björnsson 22', 50'; Kristján Gauti Emilsson 90'	Report	Haraldur Freyr Guðmundsson 44'; Magnús Þór Magnússon 90+4'	Referee: Erlendur Eiríksson

30 May 2013	Valur	1–2	Fram	Hlíðarendi, Reykjavík
20:00	Rúnar Már Sigurjónsson 49' (pen.)	Report	Almarr Ormarsson 29'; Hólmbert Aron Friðjónsson 77'	Referee: Kristinn Jakobsson

== Round of 16 ==
The draw for the last 16 was made on 3 June 2013 at the headquarters of the KSÍ.

13 June 2013	BÍ/Bolungarvík	0–1	ÍBV	Torfnesvöllur, Ísafjörður
18:00		Report	Aaron Spear 33'	Referee: Vilhjálmur Alvar Þórarinsson

19 June 2013	Grótta	3–2	Magni	Gróttuvöllur, Seltjarnarnes
19:15	Pétur Theódór Árnason 27'; Jónmundur Grétarsson 52'; Örlygur Þór Helgason 81' (o.g.)	Report	Hreggviður Heiðberg Gunnarsson 73'; Anton Ástvaldsson 80' (o.g.)	Attendance: 123; Referee: Valgeir Valgeirsson

19 June 2013	Sindri	0–3	Fylkir	Sindravellir, Höfn
19:15		Report	Viðar Örn Kjartansson 53'; Heiðar Geir Júlíusson 58'; Árni Freyr Guðnason 90+1'	Attendance: 161; Referee: Sigurður Óli Þórleifsson

19 June 2013	Víkingur R.	2–1	Tindastóll	Víkingsvöllur, Reykjavík
19:15	Aron Elís Þrándarson 2'; Hjörtur Júlíus Hjartarson 8' (pen.)	Report	Christopher Tsonis 22'	Attendance: 328; Referee: Garðar Örn Hinriksson

19 June 2013	Leiknir R.	0–3	KR	Leiknisvöllur, Breiðholt
19:15		Report	Óskar Örn Hauksson 39'; Kjartan Finnbogason 55'; Aron Bjarki Jósepsson 67'	Attendance: 650; Referee: Guðmundur Ársæll Guðmundsson

19 June 2013	Víkingur Ó.	1–1 (a.e.t.) (4–5 p)	Fram	Ólafsvíkurvöllur, Ólafsvík
19:15	Fannar Hilmarsson 70'	Report	Almarr Ormarsson 29'	Attendance: 410; Referee: Gunnar Jarl Jónsson
	Penalties
	Damir Muminovic (penalty missed); Brynjar Kristmundsson (penalty scored); Guðmundur Magnússon (penalty scored); Emir Dokara (penalty scored); Francisco Insa Bohigues (penalty scored); Alfreð Már Hjaltalín (penalty missed)		Steven Lennon (penalty scored); Hólmbert Aron Friðjónsson (penalty scored); Haukur Baldvinsson (penalty missed); Jordan Halsman (penalty scored); Bjarni Hólm Aðalsteinsson (penalty scored); Alan Lowing (penalty scored)

20 June 2013	ÍA	0–3 (a.e.t.)	Breiðablik	Akranesvöllur, Akranes
19:15		Report	Elfar Árni Aðalsteinsson 103'; Ellert Hreinsson 114'; Tómas Óli Garðarsson 119'	Attendance: 832; Referee: Magnús Þórisson

20 June 2013	Stjarnan	3–1	FH	Stjörnuvöllur, Garðabær
20:00	Garðar Jóhannsson 33', 37', 90'	Report	Björn Daníel Sverrisson 8'	Attendance: 1,130; Referee: Þóroddur Hjaltalín

== Quarter-finals ==
7 July 2013	ÍBV	0–3	KR	Hásteinsvöllur, Vestmannaeyjar
17:00		Report	Óskar Örn Hauksson 73'; Kjartan Finnbogason 76', 84'	Attendance: 908; Referee: Magnús Þórisson

7 July 2013	Fylkir	2–3 (a.e.t.)	Stjarnan	Fylkisvöllur, Reykjavík
19:15	Viðar Örn Kjartansson 39', 73'	Report	Garðar Jóhannsson 84'; Tryggvi Sveinn Bjarnason 90', 105'	Attendance: 540; Referee: Garðar Örn Hinriksson

7 July 2013	Víkingur R.	1–5	Breiðablik	Víkingsvöllur, Reykjavík
20:00	Arnþór Ingi Kristinsson 74'	Report	Nichlas Rohde 8', 79'; Elfar Árni Aðalsteinsson 34'; Ellert Hreinsson 50'; Kristinn Jónsson 66'	Attendance: 655; Referee: Erlendur Eiríksson

8 July 2013	Grótta	1–2 (a.e.t.)	Fram	Gróttuvöllur, Seltjarnarnes
19:15	Jónmundur Grétarsson 79'	Report	Almarr Ormarsson 23'; Steven Lennon 119' (pen.)	Attendance: 530; Referee: Kristinn Jakobsson

== Semi-finals ==
1 August 2013	Stjarnan	2–1 (a.e.t.)	KR	Samsung völlurinn, Garðabær
20:00	Halldór Orri Björnsson 87'; Garðar Jóhannsson 111'	Report	Gary Martin 90+5'	Attendance: 1,853; Referee: Erlendur Eiríksson

4 August 2013	Fram	2–1	Breiðablik	Laugardalsvöllur, Reykjavík
20:00	Kristinn Ingi Halldórsson 9'; Hólmbert Aron Friðjónsson 40' (pen.)	Report	Árni Vilhjálmsson 71'	Attendance: 1,027; Referee: Garðar Örn Hinriksson

== Final ==
17 August 2013	Stjarnan	3–3 (a.e.t.) (1–3 p)	Fram	Laugardalsvöllur, Reykjavík
16:00	Halldór Orri Björnsson 5' (pen.), 72'; Veigar Páll Gunnarsson 39'	Report	Hólmbert Aron Friðjónsson 53'; Almarr Ormarsson 64', 88'	Attendance: 4,318; Referee: Kristinn Jakobsson
	Penalties
	Ólafur Karl Finsen (penalty scored); Garðar Jóhannsson (penalty missed); Halldór Orri Björnsson (penalty missed); Gunnar Örn Jónsson (penalty missed)		Hólmbert Aron Friðjónsson (penalty scored); Sam Hewson (penalty scored); Jordan Halsman (penalty scored); Alan Lowing (penalty missed)
