= 2017 Fótbolti.net Tournament =

Tournament details
- Country: Iceland
- Dates: 10 January – 5 February 2017
- Teams: 8

Final positions
- Champions: FH
- Runners-up: Stjarnan

Tournament statistics
- Matches played: 16
- Goals scored: 64 (4 per match)
- Top goal scorers: Guðjón Baldvinsson; Kristján Flóki Finnbogason; Hólmbert Friðjónsson; (4 goals)
- All statistics correct as of 4 February 2017.

The 2017 Fótbolti.net Cup is the 7th season of Iceland's annual pre-season tournament. The tournament involves eight clubs from the top two leagues in Iceland, Úrvalsdeild and 1. deild, and uses a combination of group and knockout rounds to determine each team's final position in the competition. The tournament began on 10 January 2017 and concluded on 5 February 2017.

ÍBV are the defending champions, having defeated KR 2–1 in the previous year's final on 1 February 2016.

== Groups ==
=== Group A ===
Pos	Team	Pld	W	D	L	GF	GA	GD	Pts	Qualification
1	Stjarnan	3	2	1	0	9	3	+6	7	Qualification to Final phase
2	ÍA	3	2	0	1	12	8	+4	6	Qualification to Third place phase
3	Grindavík	3	0	2	1	4	9	−5	2	Qualification to Fifth place phase
4	Víkingur Ólafsvík	3	0	1	2	3	8	−5	1	Qualification to Seventh place phase

Updated to match(es) played on 28 January 2017. Source: KSI

==== Matches ====
10 January 2017	Stjarnan	6–2	ÍA	Kópavogur
20:15	Baldvinsson 4', 26'; Friðjónsson 23', 32'; Guðmundsson 65'; Jósefsson 70'	KSI report	Gunnlaugsson 37' (pen.); Lárusson 72'	Stadium: Kórinn; Referee: Vilhjálmur Alvar Þórarinsson

14 January 2017	Grindavík	2–2	Víkingur Ólafsvík	Reykjanesbær
14:00	Þorsteinsson 38'; Þórarinsson 42'	KSI report	Hjaltalín 17'; Birgisson 32'	Stadium: Reykjaneshöllin; Referee: Sigurður Óli Þórleifsson

21 January 2017	ÍA	6–1	Grindavík	Akranes
13:00	Haraldsson 8', 23' (pen.); Þorsteinsson 38'; Þórðarson 55'; Valdimarsson 81'; Hafsteinsson 85'		Bjarnason 35'	Stadium: Akranesvöllur; Referee: Ívar Orri Kristjánsson

24 January 2017	Stjarnan	1–1	Grindavík	Kópavogur
20:15	Friðjónsson 42'	KSI report	Bjarnason 30'	Stadium: Kórinn; Referee: Erlendur Eiríksson

28 January 2017	ÍA	4–1	Víkingur Ólafsvík	Akranes
11:00	Þorsteinsson 16'; Valdimarsson 19'; Lárusson 80'; Gunnlaugsson 90'	KSI report	Hafsteinsson 36'	Stadium: Akranesvöllur; Referee: Valgeir Valgeirsson

31 January 2017	Stjarnan	2–0	Víkingur Ólafsvík	Kópavogur
20:15	Baldvinsson 51'; Hilmarsson 59'	KSI report		Stadium: Kórinn; Referee: Þorvaldur Árnason

=== Group B ===
Pos	Team	Pld	W	D	L	GF	GA	GD	Pts	Qualification
1	FH	3	3	0	0	10	2	+8	9	Qualification to Final phase
2	ÍBV	3	2	0	1	6	5	+1	6	Qualification to Third place phase
3	Breiðablik	3	1	0	2	8	8	0	3	Qualification to Fifth place phase
4	Keflavík	3	0	0	3	1	10	−9	0	Qualification to Seventh place phase

Updated to match(es) played on 28 January 2017. Source: KSI

==== Matches ====
14 January 2017	Breiðablik	2–3	ÍBV	Kópavogur
10:00	Sampsted 57'; Gunnlaugsson 58'	KSI report	í Bartalsstovu 7'; Gunnarsson 24'; Vignisson 90'	Stadium: Fífan; Referee: Guðmundur Ársæll Guðmundsson

14 January 2017	Keflavík	0–3	FH	Reykjanesbær
10:15	Einarsson (red card) 29'	KSI report	Lennon 50'; Björnsson 59'; Gunnarsson 84'	Stadium: Reykjaneshöllin; Referee: Helgi Mikael Jónasson

21 January 2017	Keflavík	1–4	Breiðablik	Reykjanesbær
12:15	Guðmundsson 13'	KSI Report	Atlason 8'; McAusland 23' (o.g.); Leifsson 38'; Sigurjónsson 74'	Stadium: Reykjaneshöllin; Referee: Einar Ingi Jóhannsson

21 January 2017	FH	3–0	ÍBV	Akranes
15:00	Flóki Finnbogason 20'; Ólafsson 33'; Lennon 45'	KSI Report		Stadium: Akranesvöllur; Referee: Valgeir Valgeirsson

27 January 2017	Breiðablik	2–4	FH	Kópavogur
19:00	Eyjólfsson 21'; Leifsson 79'	KSI Report	Guðnason 8'; Flóki Finnbogason 21', 78' (pen.); Björnsson 87'	Stadium: Fífan; Referee: Þorvaldur Árnason

28 January 2017	Keflavík	0–3	ÍBV	Reykjanesbær
10:15		KSI Report	Óskarsson 6'; Sigurðsson 26'; S. Ólafsson 36' (o.g.)	Stadium: Reykjaneshöllin; Referee: Elías Ingi Árnason

== Knockout phase ==
=== Seventh place ===
4 February 2017	Keflavík	2–0	Víkingur Ólafsvík	Reykjanesbær
10:15	Nikolic 14'; J. Sævarsson 36'	KSI Report		Stadium: Reykjaneshöllin

=== Fifth place ===
3 February 2017	Breiðablik	1–1 (3–4 p)	Grindavík	Kópavogur
19:20	Friðriksson 66'	KSI Report	Þórarinsson 70'	Stadium: Fífan

=== Third place ===
4 February 2017	ÍA	0–2	ÍBV	Akranes
11:00		KSI Report	Calleja 49'; Ragnarsson 90'	Stadium: Akranesvöllur; Referee: Valgeir Valgeirsson

=== Final ===
4 February 2017
12:10

Stjarnan	2–2	FH
Baldvinsson 24'; Friðjónsson 37'	KSI Report	Lennon 11'; Finnbogason 18'
Penalties
Hilmarsson (penalty scored); Árnason (penalty missed); Baldvinsson (penalty scored); Konráðsson (penalty missed)	2–4	Finnbogason (penalty scored); Gunnarsson (penalty scored); Böðvarsson (penalty scored); Ólafsson (penalty scored)

Kórinn, Kópavogur
Referee: Þorvaldur Árnason
