= 2018 Fótbolti.net Tournament =

Tournament details
- Country: Iceland
- Dates: 12 January – 3 February 2018
- Teams: 8

Final positions
- Champions: Stjarnan
- Runner-up: Grindavík

Tournament statistics
- Matches played: 14
- Goals scored: 43 (3.07 per match)
- All statistics correct as of 3 February 2018.

The 2018 Fótbolti.net Cup is the 8th season of Iceland's annual pre-season tournament. The tournament involves eight clubs from the top two leagues in Iceland, Úrvalsdeild karla and 1. deild karla, and uses a combination of group and knockout rounds to determine each team's final position in the competition. The tournament began on 12 January 2017 and will conclude at the beginning of February 2018.

Stjarnan were crowned champions after beating Grindavík in the final.

== Groups ==
=== Group A ===
Pos	Team	Pld	W	D	L	GF	GA	GD	Pts	Qualification
1	Stjarnan	3	3	0	0	7	1	+6	9	Qualification to Final phase
2	Breiðablik	2	1	0	1	4	1	+3	3	Qualification to Third place phase
3	ÍA	3	1	0	2	3	7	−4	3	Qualification to Fifth place phase
4	ÍBV	2	0	0	2	2	7	−5	0	

Updated to match(es) played on 27 January 2018. Source: ksi.is

==== Matches ====
13 January 2018	ÍA	3–1	ÍBV	Akranes
11:00	Þ. Þórðarson 13'; Þorsteinsson 18'; S. Þórðarson 67'	ksi.is	Björnsson 72'	Stadium: Akraneshöllin; Referee: Steinar Berg Sævarsson

13 January 2018	Breiðablik	0–1	Stjarnan	Kópavogur
12:30		ksi.is fotbolti.net	Baldvinsson 53'	Stadium: Kórinn; Referee: Einar Ingi Jóhannsson

16 January 2018	Stjarnan	2–0	ÍA	Kópavogur
20:00	Konráðsson 41', 55'	ksi.is		Stadium: Kórinn; Referee: Vilhjálmur Alvar Þórarinsson

20 January 2018	Breiðablik	cancelled	ÍBV	Reykjavík
15:15				Stadium: KR-völlur; Referee: Sigurður Óli Þórleifsson

27 January 2018	ÍA	0–4	Breiðablik	Akranes
11:00		ksi.is fotbolti.net	Flosason 20' (o.g.); Willumsson 34'; Eyjólfsson 51'; Margeirsson 90'	Stadium: Akraneshöllin; Referee: Jónas Geirsson

27 January 2018	Stjarnan	4–1	ÍBV	Kópavogur
12:30	Sigurðsson 20'; Hafsteinsson 28'; Pétursson 70'; Halldórsson 83'	ksi.is	Lárusson 71'	Stadium: Kórinn; Referee: Egill Arnar Sigurþórsson

=== Group B ===
Pos	Team	Pld	W	D	L	GF	GA	GD	Pts	Qualification
1	Grindavík	3	2	1	0	6	2	+4	7	Qualification to Final phase
2	HK	3	2	0	1	5	4	+1	6	Qualification to Third place phase
3	FH	3	1	1	1	5	4	+1	4	Qualification to Fifth place phase
4	Keflavík	3	0	0	3	2	8	−6	0	

Updated to match(es) played on 26 January 2018. Source: ksi.is

==== Matches ====
12 January 2018	HK	2–1	Keflavík	Kópavogur
18:15	Gunnarsson 34' (pen.); Sófusson 80'	ksi.is fotbolti.net	Róbertsson 28'	Stadium: Kórinn; Referee: Helgi Mikael Jónasson

14 January 2018	FH	1–1	Grindavík	Akranes
15:00	Lennon 81'	ksi.is	Hannesson 36'	Stadium: Akraneshöllin; Referee: Valgeir Valgeirsson

17 January 2018	Keflavík	0–3	Grindavík	Reykjanesbær
17:30		ksi.is	Gunnarsson 6', 52'; Hannesson 80'	Stadium: Reykjaneshöllin; Referee: Guðmundur Ársæll Guðmundsson

19 January 2018	HK	2–1	FH	Kópavogur
18:00	Jónasson 51', 66'		Valdimarsson 5'	Stadium: Kórinn; Referee: Aðalbjörn Heiðar Þorsteinsson

24 January 2018	Keflavík	1–3	FH	Reykjanesbær
17:30	Hansen 44'	ksi.is fotbolti.net	Gunnarsson 7'; Kristjánsson 62'; Björnsson 75'	Stadium: Reykjaneshöllin; Referee: Erlendur Eiríksson

26 January 2018	HK	1–2	Grindavík	Kópavogur
18:00	Marteinsson 90+2'	Report	Joensen 12', 60'	Stadium: Kórinn; Referee: Pétur Guðmundsson

== Knockout phase ==
=== Fifth place ===
3 February 2018	ÍA	1–2	FH	Akranes
11:00	Þorsteinsson 36'	ksi.is	H. Björnsson 22'; A. Björnsson 90'	Stadium: Akraneshöllin; Referee: Helgi Ólafsson

=== Third place ===
3 February 2018	HK	2–3	Breiðablik	Kópavogur
11:00	Jónasson 66', 78' (pen.)	ksi.is fotbolti.net	Ólafsson 16'; Tokić 24'; Atlason 52'	Stadium: Kórinn; Referee: Egill Arnar Sigurþórsson

=== Final ===
3 February 2018	Stjarnan	1–0	Grindavík	Kópavogur
13:00	Ragnarsson 26'; Jósefsson (yellow card) 60' (red card)	ksi.is fotbolti.net		Stadium: Kórinn; Referee: Helgi Mikael Jónasson
