= 2016 Íþróttabandalag Akraness season =

Íþróttabandalag Akraness (ÍA)
2016 season
- Manager: Gunnlaugur Jónsson
- Stadium: Norðurálsvöllur
- Lengjubikarinn: Group Stages
- Top goalscorer: League: Garðar Gunnlaugsson (3); All: Garðar Gunnlaugsson (7)
| Home colours | Away colours |

The 2016 season will be ÍA's 64th season in the top-flight of Icelandic football.

Gunnlaugur Jónsson will head coach the team for the third season running. He will be assisted by Jón Þór Hauksson.

Along with Úrvalsdeild, ÍA will compete in the Lengjubikarinn and Borgunarbikarinn.

== First Team ==
As of 16 May 2016. These players competed in Úrvalsdeild, Borgunarbikarinn, Lengjubikarinn

Note: Flags indicate national team as defined under FIFA eligibility rules; some limited exceptions apply. Players may hold more than one non-FIFA nationality.

| No. | Pos. | Nation | Player |
|---|---|---|---|
| 1 | GK | ISL | Páll Gísli Jónsson |
| 4 | DF | ISL | Arnór Snær Guðmundsson |
| 5 | DF | ISL | Ármann Smári Björnsson (C) |
| 6 | MF | SCO | Iain Williamson |
| 7 | FW | NOR | Martin Hummervoll |
| 8 | MF | ISL | Hallur Flosason |
| 9 | FW | ISL | Garðar Bergmann Gunnlaugsson |
| 10 | MF | ISL | Jón Vilhelm Ákason |
| 11 | MF | ISL | Arnar Már Guðjónsson |
| 12 | GK | ISL | Árni Snær Ólafsson |
| 14 | MF | ISL | Ólafur Valur Valdimarsson |
| 15 | DF | ISL | Hafþór Pétursson |

| No. | Pos. | Nation | Player |
|---|---|---|---|
| 16 | MF | ISL | Þórður Þorsteinn Þórðarson |
| 17 | FW | ISL | Tryggvi Hrafn Haraldsson |
| 18 | MF | ISL | Albert Hafsteinsson |
| 19 | FW | ISL | Eggert Kári Karlsson |
| 20 | DF | ISL | Gylfi Veigar Gylfason |
| 21 | MF | ISL | Arnór Sigurðsson |
| 22 | MF | ISL | Steinar Þorsteinsson |
| 23 | MF | ISL | Ásgeir Marteinsson |
| 25 | DF | ISL | Andri Geir Alexandersson |
| 27 | DF | ENG | Darren Lough |
| 28 | DF | ISL | Aron Ingi Kristinsson |
| 31 | FW | ISL | Stefán Teitur Þórðarson |

== Transfers and loans ==
=== Transfers in ===
| Date | Position | No. | Player | From club | Other | Ref |
|---|---|---|---|---|---|---|
| 16 October 2015 | DF | | (Iceland) Hákon Ingi Einarsson | (Iceland) Kári | Was on loan | |
| 16 October 2015 | DF | | (Iceland) Sverrir Mar Smárason | (Iceland) Kári | Was on loan | |
| 9 November 2015 | DF | 25 | (Iceland) Andri Geir Alexandersson | (Iceland) HK | | |
| 12 January 2016 | DF | 28 | (Iceland) Aron Ingi Kristinsson | (Iceland) Kári | | |
| 12 October 2016 | FW | 31 | (Iceland) Stefán Teitur Þórðarson | (Iceland) Kári | | |
| 14 January 2016 | DF | 15 | (Iceland) Hafþór Pétursson | (Iceland) Kári | | |
| 14 January 2016 | MF | 22 | (Iceland) Steinar Þorsteinsson | (Iceland) Kári | | |

=== Transfers out ===
| Date | Position | No. | Player | To club | Other | Ref |
|---|---|---|---|---|---|---|
| 17 October 2015 | FW | 13 | (Lithuania) Arsenij Buinickij | (Lithuania) FK Utenis Utena | | |
| 27 October 2015 | MF | 6 | (Iceland) Ingimar Elí Hlynsson | (Iceland) HK | | |
| 25 November 2015 | DF | 15 | (Iceland) Teitur Pétursson | (Iceland) HK | | |
| 1 January 2016 | FW | 3 | (Iceland) Ragnar Már Lárusson | (England) Brighton | Was on loan | |
| 13 February 2016 | MF | 31 | (Serbia) Marko Andelkovic | Released | | |
| 22 February 2016 | GK | 30 | (Iceland) Marteinn Örn Halldórsson | (Iceland) Leiknir R. | | |
| 23 February 2016 | DF | | (Iceland) Hákon Ingi Einarsson | (Iceland) Þór | | |
| 23 February 2016 | DF | | (Iceland) Sverrir Mar Smárason | (Iceland) Fjarðabyggð | | |

=== Loans in ===
| Start Date | End Date | Position | No. | Player | From Club | Ref |
|---|---|---|---|---|---|---|
| 7 April 2016 | 16 October 2016 | FW | 7 | (Norway) Martin Hummervoll | (Norway) Viking FK | |
| 16 May 2016 | 16 October 2016 | MF | 6 | (Scotland) Iain Williamson | (Iceland) Víkingur R. | |

== Pre-season ==
=== Fótbolti.net Cup ===
ÍA took part in the 2016 Fótbolti.net Cup, a pre-season tournament. The team played in Group 1 along with KR, FH and Þróttur R. ÍA finished second in the group and played Stjarnan for the third place. ÍA won the game 6–1 with Steinar Þorsteinsson scoring a hattrick, earning them the bronze.

| Date | Round | Opponents | Stadium | Result F–A | Scorers |
|---|---|---|---|---|---|
| 9 January 2015 | Group Stage | Þróttur R | Akraneshöllin | 3–1 | Jón Vilhelm 45' Arnar Már 90+3' Stefán Teitur 90+5' |
| 16 January 2015 | Group Stage | FH | Akraneshöllin | 2–1 | Arnór Snær 80' Steinar Þ 90' |
| 23 January 2015 | Group Stage | KR | Akraneshöllin | 2–4 | Garðar Gunnl. 5' Jón Vilhelm 40' |
| 28 January 2015 | 3rd place final | Stjarnan | Samsung-völlurinn | 6–1 | Hallur 20' Arnar Már 40' 55' Steinar Þ 44' 71' 80'(pen.) |

== Lengjubikarinn ==
ÍA were drawn in group 3 in the Icelandic league cup, Lengjubikarinn, along with Víkingur R., KR, HK, Grindavík and Haukar. ÍA finished the group in 3rd place and did not qualify for the knockout stages.

| Date | Round | Opponents | Stadium | Result F–A | Scorers |
|---|---|---|---|---|---|
| 14 February 2016 | Group Stage | Grindavík | Akraneshöllin | 5–0 | Ásgeir M. 14' Garðar G. 49' 59' 88' Stefán Teitur 90' |
| 5 March 2016 | Group Stage | Haukar | Akraneshöllin | 3–3 | Darren 30' Garðar G. 43' Steinar Þ. 68' |
| 19 March 2016 | Group Stage | HK | Akraneshöllin | 4–2 | Albert H. 6' Ásgeir M. 33' Arnór Snær 45' Ármann Smári 79' |
| 23 March 2016 | Group Stage | KR | Akraneshöllin | 0–4 | |
| 31 March 2016 | Group Stage | Víkingur R. | Egilshöll | 3–2 | Albert 39' Arnar Már 84' Steinar 90+3' |

== Úrvalsdeild ==
=== League table ===
| Pos | Team | Pld | W | D | L | GF | GA | GD | Pts |
|---|---|---|---|---|---|---|---|---|---|
| 6 | Breiðablik | 22 | 10 | 5 | 7 | 27 | 20 | +7 | 35 |
| 7 | Víkingur Reykjavík | 22 | 9 | 5 | 8 | 29 | 32 | −3 | 32 |
| 8 | ÍA | 22 | 10 | 1 | 11 | 28 | 33 | −5 | 31 |
| 9 | ÍBV | 22 | 6 | 5 | 11 | 23 | 27 | −4 | 23 |
| 10 | Víkingur Ólafsvík | 22 | 5 | 6 | 11 | 23 | 38 | −15 | 21 |

Source: KSÍ (in Icelandic), Soccerway
Rules for classification: 1) Points; 2) Goal difference; 3) Goals scored; 4) Head-to-head points; 5) Head-to-head goal difference; 6) Head-to-head goals scored; 7) Head-to-head away goals scored; 8) Play-off (only for deciding champion); 9) Draw.

=== Matches ===
Win Draw Loss Upcoming fixture

| 1 May 2015 1 | ÍBV | 4–0 | ÍA | Vestmannaeyjar |
| 17:00 GMT | Simon Kollerud Smidt 9'; Aron Bjarnason 15'; Sindri Snær Magnússon 36' (yellow card) 38'; Charles Vernam 82'; Jonathan Patrick Barden (yellow card) 39'; Hafsteinn Briem (yellow card) 60'; Mees Siers (yellow card) 90+5' | Report | Darren Lough (yellow card) 16'; Arnór Snær Guðmundsson (yellow card) 36'; Arnar Már Guðjónsson (yellow card) 65'; Þórður Þorsteinn Þórðarson (yellow card) 90' | Stadium: Hásteinsvöllur; Attendance: 914; Referee: Pétur Guðmundsson |

| 8 May 2015 2 | FH | 2–1 | ÍA | Hafnarfjörður |
| 19:15 GMT | Bjarni Þór Viðarsson 41'; Atli Viðar Björnsson 87'; Atli Guðnason (yellow card) 22'; Steven Lennon (red card) 57'; Emil Pálsson (yellow card) 66'; Kristján Flóki Finnbogason (yellow card) 83' | Report | Jón Vilhelm Ákason 82' (yellow card) 80'; Albert Hafsteinsson (yellow card) 90' | Stadium: Kaplakrikavöllur; Attendance: 1789; Referee: Valdimar Pálsson |

| 12 May 2015 3 | ÍA | 1–0 | Fjölnir | Akranes |
| 19:15 GMT | Garðar Gunnlaugsson 17'; Eggert Kári Karlsson (yellow card) 27' | Report | Viðar Ari Jónsson (yellow card) 30'; Gunnar Már Guðmundsson (yellow card) 45+1'; Mario Tadejevic (yellow card) 71' | Stadium: Norðurálsvöllurinn; Attendance: 987; Referee: Vilhjálmur Alvar Þórarinsson |

| 16 May 2015 4 | Víkingur Ó. | 3–0 | ÍA | Ólafsvík |
| 20:00 GMT | William Dominguez Da Silva 6'; Hrvoje Tokic 37'; Aleix Egea Acame 83'; Emir Dokara (yellow card) 75'; Pontus Nordenberg (yellow card) 85'; Óttar Ásbjörnsson (yellow card) 89' | Report | Ólafur Valur Valdimarsson (yellow card) 71' | Stadium: Ólafsvíkurvöllur; Referee: Gunnar Sverrir Gunnarsson |

| 21 May 2015 5 | ÍA | 1–1 | Fylkir | Akranes |
| 16:00 GMT | Garðar Gunnlaugsson 36' | Report | Albert Brynjar Ingason 28'; Oddur Ingi Guðmundsson (yellow card) 90+2' | Stadium: Norðurálsvöllurinn; Attendance: 832; Referee: Vilhjálmur Alvar Þórarinsson |

| 29 May 2015 6 | Víkingur R. | 3–2 | ÍA | Reykjavík |
| 19:15 GMT | Vladimir Tufegdzic 4' (yellow card) 59'; Óttar Magnús Karlsson 55'; Ívar Örn Jónsson 90+2'; Viktor Bjarki Arnarsson (yellow card) 90' | Report | Jón Vilhelm Ákason 2'; Garðar Gunnlaugsson 5' (yellow card) 82' | Stadium: Víkingsvöllur; Attendance: 1050; Referee: Helgi Mikael Jónasson |

| 5 June 2015 7 | ÍA | 0–1 | Þróttur R. | Akranes |
| 19:15 GMT | Ármann Smári Björnsson (yellow card) 44'; Iain Williamson (yellow card) 90'; Þórður Þorsteinn Þórðarson (yellow card) 90' | Report | Aron Þórður Albertsson 90'; Viktor Unnar Illugason (yellow card) 47'; Aron Lloyd Green (yellow card) 72' | Stadium: Norðurálsvöllurinn; Attendance: 1030; Referee: Valdimar Pálsson |

| 23 June 2015 8 | KR | v | ÍA | Reykjavík |
| 19:15 GMT | | | | Stadium: Alvogenvöllurinn |

| 29 June 2015 9 | ÍA | v | Stjarnan | Akranes |
| 19:15 GMT | | | | Stadium: Norðurálsvöllurinn |

| 10 July 2015 10 | Breiðablik | v | ÍA | Kópavogur |
| 16:00 GMT | | | | Stadium: Kópavogsvöllur |

| 17 July 2015 11 | ÍA | v | Valur | Akranes |
| 19:15 GMT | | | | Stadium: Norðurálsvöllurinn |

=== Results by matchday ===
| Matchday | 1 | 2 | 3 | 4 | 5 | 6 | 7 | 8 | 9 | 10 | 11 | 12 | 13 | 14 | 15 | 16 | 17 | 18 | 19 | 20 | 21 | 22 |
|---|---|---|---|---|---|---|---|---|---|---|---|---|---|---|---|---|---|---|---|---|---|---|
| Ground | A | A | H | A | H | A | H | A | H | A | H | H | H | A | H | A | H | A | H | A | H | A |
| Result | L | L | W | L | D | L | L | | | | | | | | | | | | | | | |
| Position | 12 | 12 | 9 | 10 | 10 | 10 | 11 | | | | | | | | | | | | | | | |

Updated to match(es) played on 5 June 2016. Source:
A = Away; H = Home; W = Win; D = Draw; L = Loss

=== Results ===
| Overall | | | | | | | | Home | | | | | | Away | | | | | |
| Pld | W | D | L | GF | GA | GD | Pts | W | D | L | GF | GA | GD | W | D | L | GF | GA | GD |
|---|---|---|---|---|---|---|---|---|---|---|---|---|---|---|---|---|---|---|---|
| 7 | 1 | 1 | 5 | 5 | 14 | −9 | 4 | 1 | 1 | 1 | 2 | 2 | 0 | 0 | 0 | 4 | 3 | 12 | −9 |

Last updated: 5 June 2016.

=== Points breakdown ===
- Points at home: 4
- Points away from home: 0
- 6 Points:
- 4 Points:
- 3 Points:
- 2 Points:
- 1 Point:
- 0 Points:

== Borgunarbikarinn ==
ÍA was drawn against 1. deild karla team KV in the Round of 32 in the Icelandic Cup, Borgunarbikarinn. ÍA dominated the game but only scored one goal through Þórður Þorsteinn Þórðarson.

=== Matches ===
| 25 May 2016 Round of 32 | ÍA | 1–0 | KV | Akranes |
| 19:15 GMT | Þórður Þorsteinn Þórðarson 4'; Darren Lough (yellow card) 45+1'; Albert Hafsteinsson (penalty missed) 80' | Report | Hugi Jóhannesson (yellow card) 79' | Stadium: Norðurálsvöllurinn; Attendance: 496; Referee: Þorvaldur Árnason |

== Squad statistics ==
=== Goalscorers ===
Includes all competitive matches.

As of match played 5 June 2016

| Rank | Pos. | No. | Player | Úrvalsdeild | Borgunarbikar | Lengjubikar | Total |
|---|---|---|---|---|---|---|---|
| 1 | FW | 9 | (Iceland) Garðar Gunnlaugsson | 3 | 0 | 4 | 7 |
| 2 | MF | 23 | (Iceland) Ásgeir Marteinsson | 0 | 0 | 2 | 2 |
| 3 | MF | 22 | (Iceland) Steinar Þorsteinsson | 0 | 0 | 2 | 2 |
| 4 | MF | 18 | (Iceland) Albert Hafsteinsson | 0 | 0 | 2 | 2 |
| 5 | MF | 10 | (Iceland) Jón Vilhelm Ákason | 2 | 0 | 0 | 2 |
| 6 | FW | 31 | (Iceland) Stefán Teitur Þórðarson | 0 | 0 | 1 | 1 |
| 7 | DF | 27 | (England) Darren Lough | 0 | 0 | 1 | 1 |
| 8 | DF | 4 | (Iceland) Arnór Snær Guðmundsson | 0 | 0 | 1 | 1 |
| 9 | DF | 5 | (Iceland) Ármann Smári Björnsson | 0 | 0 | 1 | 1 |
| 10 | MF | 11 | (Iceland) Arnar Már Guðjónsson | 0 | 0 | 1 | 1 |
| 11 | DF | 16 | (Iceland) Þórður Þorsteinn Þórðarson | 0 | 1 | 0 | 1 |

=== Goalkeeping ===
Includes all competitive matches.

As of match played 5 June 2016

| Pos. | No. | Player | Clean Sheets | Goals Against | Penalties Saved |
|---|---|---|---|---|---|
| GK | 1 | (Iceland) Páll Gísli Jónsson | 0 | 2 | 0 |
| GK | 12 | (Iceland) Árni Snær Ólafsson | 3 | 24 | 0 |

=== Appearances ===
Includes all competitive matches. Numbers in parentheses are sub-appearances.

As of match played 5 June 2016

| No. | Pos. | Player | Úrvalsdeild | Borgunarbikar | Lengjubikar | Total |
|---|---|---|---|---|---|---|
| 1 | GK | (Iceland) Páll Gísli Jónsson | 0 | 0 | 1 | 1 |
| 4 | DF | (Iceland) Arnór Snær Guðmundsson | 7 | 0 | 4 | 11 |
| 5 | DF | (Iceland) Ármann Smári Björnsson | 7 | 0 | 4 | 11 |
| 6 | MF | (Scotland) Iain Williamson | 2 (1) | 1 | 0 | 4 |
| 7 | FW | (Norway) Martin Hummervoll | 4 | 1 | 0 | 5 |
| 8 | MF | (Iceland) Hallur Flosason | 1 (1) | (1) | 1 (1) | 5 |
| 9 | FW | (Iceland) Garðar Gunnlaugsson | 7 | (1) | 2 (1) | 11 |
| 10 | MF | (Iceland) Jón Vilhelm Ákason | 3 (3) | 1 | 1 (2) | 10 |
| 11 | MF | (Iceland) Arnar Már Guðjónsson | 4 | 0 | 4 | 8 |
| 12 | GK | (Iceland) Árni Snær Ólafsson | 7 | 1 | 4 | 12 |
| 14 | MF | (Iceland) Ólafur Valur Valdimarsson | 2 (2) | 1 | 2 (1) | 8 |
| 15 | DF | (Iceland) Hafþór Pétursson | 0 | 0 | 1 | 1 |
| 16 | MF | (Iceland) Þórður Þorsteinn Þórðarsson | 7 | 1 | 4 (1) | 13 |
| 17 | FW | (Iceland) Tryggvi Hrafn Haraldsson | 1 | 0 | 0 | 1 |
| 18 | MF | (Iceland) Albert Hafsteinsson | 6 | (1) | 5 | 12 |
| 19 | FW | (Iceland) Eggert Kári Karlsson | 4 (3) | 0 | 1 (2) | 10 |
| 20 | DF | (Iceland) Gylfi Veigar Gylfason | 3 (2) | 1 | 3 | 9 |
| 21 | MF | (Iceland) Arnór Sigurðsson | (1) | 1 | 2 | 4 |
| 22 | MF | (Iceland) Steinar Þorsteinsson | 2 (3) | 1 | 4 (1) | 11 |
| 23 | MF | (Iceland) Ásgeir Marteinsson | 3 (2) | 0 | 5 | 10 |
| 25 | DF | (Iceland) Andri Geir Alexandersson | 0 | 1 | 1 (1) | 3 |
| 27 | DF | (England) Darren Lough | 6 | 1 | 3 | 10 |
| 28 | DF | (Iceland) Aron Ingi Kristinsson | 1 (2) | 0 | 2 (3) | 8 |
| 31 | FW | (Iceland) Stefán Teitur Þórðarson | (1) | 0 | 1 (3) | 5 |

=== Disciplinary ===
Includes all competitive matches.

As of match played 5 June 2016

| No. | Pos. | Player | Yellow card | Second yellow card | Red card |
|---|---|---|---|---|---|
| 4 | DF | (Iceland) Arnór Snær Guðmundsson | 1 | 0 | 0 |
| 5 | DF | (Iceland) Ármann Smári Björnsson | 2 | 0 | 0 |
| 6 | MF | (Scotland) Iain Williamson | 1 | 0 | 0 |
| 9 | FW | (Iceland) Garðar Gunnlaugsson | 1 | 0 | 0 |
| 10 | MF | (Iceland) Jón Vilhelm Ákason | 1 | 0 | 0 |
| 11 | MF | (Iceland) Arnar Már Guðjónsson | 3 | 1 | 0 |
| 14 | MF | (Iceland) Ólafur Valur Valdimarsson | 2 | 1 | 0 |
| 16 | DF | (Iceland) Þórður Þorsteinn Þórðarson | 3 | 0 | 0 |
| 18 | MF | (Iceland) Albert Hafsteinsson | 1 | 0 | 0 |
| 18 | FW | (Iceland) Eggert Kári Karlsson | 1 | 0 | 0 |
| 21 | MF | (Iceland) Arnór Sigurðsson | 1 | 0 | 0 |
| 27 | DF | (England) Darren Lough | 3 | 0 | 0 |
| 28 | DF | (Iceland) Aron Ingi Kristinsson | 1 | 0 | 0 |

=== Squad Stats ===
Includes all competitive matches; Úrvalsdeild, Borgunarbikar and Lengjubikar.

| | Úrvalsdeild | Borgunarbikar | Lengjubikar | Total |
|---|---|---|---|---|
| Games played | 7 | 1 | 5 | 13 |
| Games won | 1 | 1 | 3 | 5 (39%) |
| Games drawn | 1 | 0 | 1 | 2 (15%) |
| Games lost | 5 | 0 | 1 | 6 (46%) |
| Goals scored | 5 | 1 | 15 | 21 |
| Goals conceded | 14 | 0 | 11 | 25 |
| Clean sheets | 1 | 1 | 1 | 3 |
| Yellow cards | 12 | 1 | 7 | 20 |
| Red cards | 0 | 0 | 2 | 2 |

Last updated: 5 June 2016
