= 2016 Fótbolti.net Tournament =

Tournament details
- Country: Iceland
- Dates: 8 January – 3 February 2016
- Teams: 8

Final positions
- Champions: ÍBV
- Runners-up: KR

Tournament statistics
- Matches played: 16
- Goals scored: 51 (3.19 per match)
- Top goal scorer(s): Mikkel Maigaard (5 goals)

The 2016 Fótbolti.net Cup was the 6th season of Iceland's annual pre-season tournament. The tournament involved eight clubs from the top two leagues in Iceland, Úrvalsdeild karla and 1. deild, and used a combination of group and knockout rounds to determine each team's final position in the competition. The tournament began on 8 January 2016 and concluded on 3 February 2016.

ÍBV won the competition after they defeated KR 2–1 in the final on 1 February 2016.

== Groups ==
=== Group A ===
Team	Pld	W	D	L	GF	GA	GD	Pts
KR	3	3	0	0	8	3	+5	9
ÍA	3	2	0	1	7	6	+1	6
FH	3	0	1	2	2	4	−2	1
Þróttur Reykjavík	3	0	1	2	1	5	−4	1

==== Matches ====
8 January 2016	KR	2–1	FH	KR-völlur, Seltjarnarnes
23:00	Martin 77'; Ormarsson 90'		Lennon 43'	Referee: Þorvaldur Árnason

9 January 2016	ÍA	3–1	Þróttur Reykjavíkk	Akranesvöllur, Akranes
13:00	Ákason 45'; Guðjónsson 90+3'; Þórðarson 90+6'		Ásþórsson 45'	Referee: Halldór Breiðfjörð Jóhannsson

12 January 2016	Þróttur Reykjavík	0–2	KR	Egilshöll, Reykjavík
21:45			Tryggvason 8', 64'	Referee: Pétur Guðmundsson

16 January 2016	ÍA	2–1	FH	Akraneshöllin, Akranes
13:00	Guðmundsson 80'; Þorsteinsson 90'		Lennon 3'	Attendance: 117; Referee: Valgeir Valgeirsson

19 January 2016	Þróttur Reykjavík	0–0	FH	Egilshöll, Reykjavík
21:45				Referee: Vilhjálmur Alvar Þórarinsson

23 January 2016	ÍA	2–4	KR	Akraneshöllin, Akranes
13:00	Gunnlaugsson 5'; Ákason 40'		Pálmason 23'; Ormarsson 26'; Hauksson 45'; Tryggvason 90+2'	Attendance: 250; Referee: Ívar Orri Kristjánsson

=== Group B ===
Team	Pld	W	D	L	GF	GA	GD	Pts
ÍBV	3	2	1	0	7	3	+4	7
Stjarnan	3	2	1	0	7	5	+2	7
Breiðablik	3	1	0	2	3	5	−2	3
Víkingur Ólafsvík	3	0	0	3	4	8	−4	0

==== Matches ====
9 January 2016	Breiðablik	0–2	ÍBV	Kópavogsvöllur, Kópavogur
13:15			Bjarnason 32'; Þorvaldsson 43'	Referee: Guðmundur Ársæll Guðmundsson

12 January 2016	Stjarnan	3–2	Víkingur Ólafsvík	Kórinn, Kópavogur
22:00	Sigurðarson 6'; Halldórsson 26' (pen.); Björgvinsson 36'		Kubat 31' (pen.); Ragnarsson 38'	Referee: Erlendur Eiríksson

16 January 2016	Breiðablik	1–0	Víkingur Ólafsvík	Fífan, Kópavogur
13:15	Sigurjónsson 41' (pen.)			Referee: Þorvaldur Árnason

17 January 2016	ÍBV	1–1	Stjarnan	Kórinn, Kópavogur
15:00	Elíasson 87'		Baldvinsson 58'	Referee: Pétur Guðmundsson

20 January 2016	Stjarnan	3–2	Breiðablik	Fífan, Kópavogur
21:00	Björgvinsson 26'; Jóhannesson 46'; Baldvinsson 65'		Margeirsson 36'; Eyjólfsson 82'

23 January 2016	Víkingur Ólafsvík	2–4	ÍBV	Akraneshöllin, Akranes
15:00	Turudija 41'; Mbang Ondo 82'		Maigaard 16', 20', 74'; Pepa 45'	Referee: Valgeir Valgeirsson

== Knockout phase ==
=== Seventh place ===
2 February 2016	Þróttur Reykjavík	0–1	Víkingur Ólafsvík	Þróttarvöllur, Reykjavík
22:00			Turudija 56'	Referee: Helgi Mikael Jónasson

=== Fifth place ===
29 January 2016	Breiðablik	0–1	FH	Fífan, Kópavogur
12:30	Helgason (yellow card) 73'		Lennon 49'; Pálsson (yellow card) 49'; Þórisson (yellow card) 73'; Gunnarsson (yellow card) 90+3'	Referee: Guðmundur Ársæll Guðmundsson

=== Third place ===
28 January 2016	Stjarnan	1–6	ÍA	Stjörnuvöllur, Garðabær
20:00	Hansen 18'		Guðjónsson 20', 55'; Flosason 40'; Þorsteinsson 44', 73', 81' (pen.)	Attendance: 51; Referee: Gunnar Helgason

=== Final ===
1 February 2016
22:00

KR	1–2	ÍBV
Tryggvason 78'; Michaelsson (yellow card) 82' (yellow-red card)		Maigaard 25', 34'; Punyed (red card) 68'

Egilshöll, Reykjavík
Referee: Þorvaldur Árnason
