= 2015 Fótbolti.net Tournament =

Tournament details
- Country: Iceland
- Dates: 10 January – 6 February
- Teams: 8

Final positions
- Champions: Breiðablik UBK
- Runners-up: Stjarnan

Tournament statistics
- Matches played: 16
- Goals scored: 64 (4 per match)

In 2015 the Fótbolti.net Cup, a football competition in Iceland, was won by the Breiðablik UBK team from Kópavogur.

== Groups ==
=== Group A ===
Team	Pld	W	D	L	GF	GA	GD	Pts
Breiðablik UBK	3	2	1	0	8	4	+4	7
FH	3	2	0	1	10	4	+6	6
IA Akranes	3	1	0	2	4	6	−2	3
Trottur Reykjavik	3	0	1	2	5	13	−8	1

10 January 2015	Breiðablik UBK	2–1	FH	Fífan, Kópavogur
12:30	Aðalsteinsson 45+2' (pen.), 82'	Report	Serwy 61'	Attendance: 200; Referee: Pétur Guðmundsson

10 January 2015	IA Akranes	3–1	Trottur Reykjavik	Akraneshöllin, Akranes
13:15	Hafsteinsson 25'; Guðjónsson 59'; Gunnlaugsson 87'	Report	Jónsson 10'	Referee: Valgeir Valgeirsson

13 January 2015	Trottur Reykjavik	1–7	FH	Valbjarnarvöllur, Reykjavík
20:35	Dion 86'		K. Björnsson 6' (o.g.); Serwy 9'; A. Björnsson 12', 34', 59'; Pálsson 50'; Lennon 84'

17 January 2015	Breiðablik UBK	3–0	IA Akranes	Kópavogsvöllur, Kópavogur
12:30	Hreinsson 42'; Atlason 57'; Ólafsson 67'

20 January 2015	Trottur Reykjavik	3–3	Breiðablik UBK	Egilshöll, Reykjavík
20:30

24 January 2015	IA Akranes	1–2	FH	Akraneshöllin, Akranes
13:15	Gunnlaugsson 85'		Gudmundsson 53', 90'

=== Group B ===
Team	Pld	W	D	L	GF	GA	GD	Pts
Stjarnan	3	2	0	1	6	4	+2	6
Keflavík ÍF	3	1	2	0	7	6	+1	5
IBV Vestmannaeyjar	3	1	1	1	11	8	+3	4
UMF Grindavík	3	0	1	2	4	10	−6	1

10 January 2015	Keflavík ÍF	1–1	UMF Grindavík	Reykjaneshöllin, Keflavík
12:30	Sveinsson 15'	Report	Björgvinsson 46'	Attendance: 143; Referee: Aðalbjörn Heiðar Þorsteinsson

13 January 2015	Stjarnan	3–1	UMF Grindavík	Samsung völlurinn, Garðabær
22:15	Barðdal 15'; Gudjónsson 41'; Knútsson 55'	Report	Jugovic 36'	Referee: Garðar Örn Hinriksson

17 January 2015	Keflavík ÍF	4–4	IBV Vestmannaeyjar	Reykjaneshöllin, Reykjanesbær
14:00	Rúnarsson 29' (pen.); Elísson 83', 90+1'; Matthíasson 90+3' (pen.)		Bjarnason 3', 45'; Þorvarðarson 25'; Þorvarðarson 43'

21 January 2015	Stjarnan	1–2	Keflavík ÍF	Kórinn, Kópavogur
22:10	Björgvinsson 12'		Rúnarsson 49'; Guðmundsson 90'

25 January 2015	IBV Vestmannaeyjar	6–2	UMF Grindavík	Akraneshöllin, Akranes
18:00	Gunnarsson 5', 43'; Bjarnason 8', 42', 67'; Ólafsson 26'		Smárason 38'; Bjarnason 78'	Attendance: 46; Referee: Gunnar Sverrir Gunnarsson

27 January 2015	IBV Vestmannaeyjar	1–2	Stjarnan	Kórinn, Kópavogur
21:15	Gunnarsson 16'		Knutsso 37'; Björgvinsson 80'	Attendance: 46

== Third place ==
31 January 2015	Keflavík ÍF	1–1 (5–3 p)	FH	Reykjaneshöllin, Reykjanesbær
12:30	Sveinsson 29'		Björnsson 8'

== Fifth place ==
1 February 2015	IA Akranes	2–2 (4–1 p)	IBV Vestmannaeyjar	Akraneshöllin, Akranes
15:30	Flosason 74'; Gunnlaugsson 83'		Óskarsson 9'; Friðriksson 62'

== Final ==
3 February 2015	Stjarnan	1–2	Breiðablik UBK	Kórinn, Kópavogur
15:30	Gunnarsson 58'		Atlason 35'; Aðalsteinsson 64'
