= Shahab Zahedi =

Iranian footballer (born 1995)

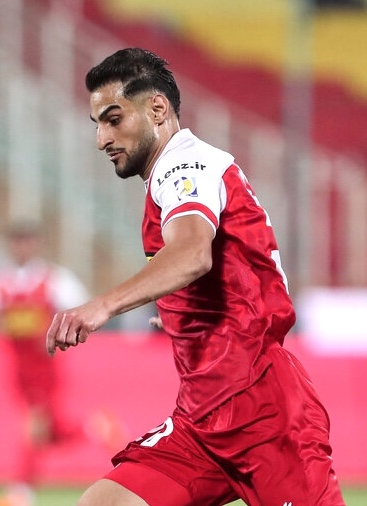
- Zahedi with Persepolis in 2023

Personal information
- Full name: Shahab Zahedi Tabar
- Date of birth: 18 August 1995 (age 31)
- Place of birth: Malayer, Iran
- Height: 1.87 m (6 ft 2 in)
- Positions: Striker; winger

Team information
- Current team: Johor Darul Ta'zim
- Number: 7

Youth career
- 2009–2013: Paykan
- 2013–2016: Persepolis
- 2013–2014: → Moghavemat Tehran (loan)

Senior career*
Years	Team	Apps	(Gls)
2014–2017	Persepolis	4	(0)
2017	→ Machine Sazi (loan)	12	(0)
2017–2019	ÍBV	23	(8)
2019	Suwon Samsung Bluewings	0	(0)
2019–2021	Olimpik Donetsk	34	(14)
2021–2025	Zorya Luhansk	28	(8)
2022–2023	→ Puskás Akadémia (loan)	36	(12)
2023–2024	→ Persepolis (loan)	16	(6)
2024	→ Avispa Fukuoka (loan)	31	(9)
2025	Avispa Fukuoka	21	(0)
2026–	Johor Darul Ta'zim	5	(7)

International career^{‡}
2023–	Iran	2	(0)
Medal record
Representing Iran
CAFA Nations Cup
Winner	2023 Kyrgyzstan – Uzbekistan	Team
- * Club domestic league appearances and goals as of 27 September 2025 ‡ National team caps and goals as of 29 September 2026

Shahab Zahedi Tabar (Persian: شهاب زاهدی, born 18 August 1995) is an Iranian professional footballer who plays as a forward for Malaysia Super League club Johor Darul Ta'zim and also Iran national team.

== Club career ==
=== Youth teams ===
Shahab Zahedi joined Persepolis Youth Academy in 2013 from Paykan before joining Moghavemat Tehran F.C. Academy on loan. He played for Persepolis in the AFC Vision Asia U-21 Tehran Premier League.

=== Persepolis ===
Following good performances with the U21 side, Zahedi was promoted to the Persepolis first team in October 2014 by Hamid Derakhshan. He made his debut for Persepolis in a Hazfi Cup match against Kargar Boneh Gaz Bushehr as a substitute for Mehdi Taremi. He made his professional debut for the club in 1–0 loss against Saipa on 21 October 2004. He made five appearances in total for Persepolis in the 2014–2015 season. In 2015, while playing for the Persepolis youth team, Zahedi received a two-year suspension after failing a doping test.

=== Machine Sazi ===
On 5 January 2017, Zahedi joined Iranian football club Machine Sazi on loan for the duration of the 2016–2017 Iranian football season. His debut came three days later, coming off the bench in a 3–3 draw at home against Saipa FC on 8 January 2017. His first start came on 18 January 2017 in an away game against Gostaresh FC. In total he made 12 appearances for Machine Sazi who were relegated to the Azadegan league.

=== ÍBV Vestmannaeyjar ===
On 16 July 2017, Zahedi joined Icelandic club ÍBV Vestmannaeyjar on a one-year deal, becoming the first Iranian player to play football in Iceland. He won the 2017 Icelandic Cup on 12 August 2017. On 30 November 2017, Zahedi extended his contract with ÍBV by three years following strong performances. ÍBV also announced the signing of Persepolis academy players Parsa Zarmian and Ehsan Sarbazi. In an interview with Fotboli.net in March 2018, ÍBV coach Kristján Guðmundsson disclosed an agreement made between ÍBV and Persepolis to develop specific youth players, citing Shahab Zahedi as an example. Zahedi made his UEFA debut on 12 July 2018 in the 2018–19 UEFA Europa League.

=== Suwon Samsung Bluewings ===
On January 16, 2019, Zahedi joined South Korean club Suwon Samsung Bluewings on undisclosed terms. Zahedi's doping history was quickly publicized in Korean sports media, leading the Suwon Bluewings and Zahedi to agree to a mutual termination of the contract only one day following the deal's announcement. The fiasco created some controversy in Korea, prompting criticism of the Suwon Bluewings leadership and leaving Shahab Zahedi without a club until August.

=== Olimpik Donetsk ===
Zahedi signed for Ukrainian club FC Olimpik Donetsk on 4 August 2019 as a free agent, following an extended period without any professional football. Zahedi established himself as a key player in his first season in Ukraine, playing 24 games and scoring 6 goals for Olimpik Donetsk across the Ukrainian Premier League and the Ukrainian Cup. Zahedi finished as Olimpik's top scorer in all competitions for the 2019–2020 season. In his second season with Olimpik Donetsk, Zahedi exceeded his first season's total goal tally on 6 December 2020, following a brace against Rukh Lviv, topping the Ukrainian Premier League's goalscorer charts in the process and generating speculation of a transfer to Ukrainian heavyweight Dynamo Kyiv.

=== Zorya Luhansk ===
On 8 February 2021 FC Zorya Luhansk announced the signing of Shahab Zahedi on a four-year deal. Ukrainian sports media reported that Zorya had paid a transfer fee of around 360 thousand euros to Olimpik Donetsk and that Zahedi had turned down an offer from Portuguese club Rio Ave. Zorya Luhansk's press service commemorated the announcement by publishing a video highlight reel of Zahedi's performances over his time in Ukraine. He made his debut for Zorya on February 20, 2021, scoring the only goal in a 1–0 win over FC Mariupol. He played alongside his Iranian teammate Allahyar Sayyadmanesh. Zahedi finished the 2020–21 Ukrainian Premier League season with 10 goals between his two clubs. Zahedi began to stake his place in the 2021–22 Ukrainian Premier League, finishing the first half of the season with 6 goals in 922 minutes played over 16 matches. Zahedi had also come off the bench in the second leg of a Europa League Qualifying round against SK Rapid Wien, scoring his first goal in continental competition, but it was not enough to see Zorya into the next round. Zahedi then made his debut in the inaugural season of the UEFA Europa Conference League against AS Roma, coming off the bench in a 3–0 loss. He scored his first Conference League goal in a 2–0 victory over CSKA Sofia. However, Zahedi's season was interrupted by the sudden commencement of the Russo-Ukrainian War in late February, during the league's winter break, leading to an imposition of martial law in Ukraine and the indefinite suspension of the league schedule.

=== Puskás Akadémia FC ===
On 10 March 2022, Zahedi signed with Puskás Akadémia FC until the end of the season. On 23 April 2022, he scored twice against Fehérvár FC at the MOL Aréna Sóstó. On 30 April 2022, he scored again twice against Mezőkövesd in Nemzeti Bajnokság I at the Pancho Aréna in Felcsút. On 2 July 2022 he signed a new contract on loan until 2024.

=== Avispa Fukuoka ===
On 7 March 2024, Zahedi joined J1 League club Avispa Fukuoka on loan until the end of the season, becoming the first Iranian national to play in the J1 League.

== International career ==
Zahedi received his first national team call up in January 2022 for World Cup qualifiers. He made his debut against Kyrgyzstan on 16 June 2023.

=== International ===
As of match played 29 September 2026

Appearances and goals by national team and year
National team	Year	Apps	Goals
Iran
Iran	2023	1	0
Iran	2026	1	0
Total		2	0

== Personal life ==
On 13 January 2026, Zahedi came out in support of the 2025–2026 Iranian protests on his Instagram by criticizing the Islamic government, saying "You stifled the protest, cut off the internet, and silenced the streets with the blood of the people. From this blood, Iran will rise again".

== Career statistics ==
As of 27 September 2025

Club	Division	Season	League		Cup		League Cup		Continental		Other		Total	
Club	Division	Season	Apps	Goals	Apps	Goals	Apps	Goals	Apps	Goals	Apps	Goals	Apps	Goals
Persepolis	Pro League	2014–15	4	0	1	0	–		0	0	–		5	0
Persepolis	Pro League	2015–16	0	0	0	0	–		0	0	–		0	0
Persepolis	Pro League	2016–17	0	0	1	0	–		0	0	–		1	0
Machine Sazi (loan)	Pro League	2016–17	12	0	0	0	–		–		–		12	0
Total			16	0	2	0	0		0	0	0		18	0
ÍBV	Úrvalsdeild	2017	9	4	0	0	0	0	–		–		9	4
ÍBV	Úrvalsdeild	2018	14	4	2	2	4	0	2	0	1	0	23	6
Total			23	8	2	2	4	0	2	0	1	0	32	10
Olimpik Donetsk	UPL	2019–20	23	6	1	0	–		–		–		24	6
Olimpik Donetsk	UPL	2020–21	11	8	1	0	–		–		–		12	8
Total			34	14	2	0	–		–		–		36	14
Zorya Luhansk	UPL	2020–21	12	2	3	0	–		0	0	–		15	2
Zorya Luhansk	UPL	2021–22	16	6	1	2	–		7	2	–		24	10
Total			28	8	4	2	–		7	2	–		39	12
Puskás Akadémia (loan)	Nemzeti Bajnokság I	2021–22	8	4	0	0	_		0	0	_		8	4
Puskás Akadémia (loan)	Nemzeti Bajnokság I	2022–23	28	9	3	2	_		2	0	_		33	11
Total			36	13	3	2	_		2	0	_		41	15
Persepolis (loan)	Pro League	2023–24	16	6	0	0	–		6	1	_		22	7
Avispa Fukuoka (loan)	J1 League	2024	31	9	1	0	–		–		2	2	34	11
Avispa Fukuoka	J1 League	2025	21	0	2	0	2	1	–		0	0	25	1
Total			52	9	3	0	2	1	–		2	2	59	12
Career total			205	58	16	6	6	1	17	3	3	2	247	70

== Honours ==
=== Club ===
ÍBV

- Icelandic Cup: 2017

Zorya Luhansk

- Ukrainian Cup: Runner-Up 2020–21

Iran

- CAFA Nations Cup: 2023

Johor Darul Ta'zim

- Malaysian Charity Shield: 2026
