= 2022 Fótbolti.net Tournament =

Tournament details
- Country: Iceland
- Dates: 8 January – 29 January 2022
- Teams: 8

Final positions
- Champions: Stjarnan
- Runners-up: Breiðablik
- All statistics correct as of 2 December 2022.

The 2022 Fótbolti.net Cup was the 12th season of Iceland's annual pre-season tournament. The tournament involves eight clubs from the top two leagues in Iceland, Úrvalsdeild karla and 1. deild karla, and uses a combination of group and knockout rounds to determine each team's final position in the competition.

== Fotbolti.net Cup A ==
=== Group A ===
Pos	Team	Pld	W	D	L	GF	GA	GD	Pts	Qualification or relegation
1	Breiðablik	3	3	0	0	10	3	+7	9	Qualification to Final phase
2	Leiknir	3	2	0	1	7	4	+3	6	Qualification to Third place phase
3	Keflavík	3	1	0	2	8	10	−2	3	Qualification to Fifth place phase
4	HK	3	0	0	3	3	11	−8	0	Qualification to Seventh place phase

Updated to match(es) played on 5 January 2022. Source: https://www.ksi.is/mot/stakt-mot/?motnumer=43847

=== Group B ===
Pos	Team	Pld	W	D	L	GF	GA	GD	Pts	Qualification or relegation
1	Stjarnan	3	3	0	0	13	2	+11	9	Qualification to Final phase
2	ÍA	3	2	0	1	8	10	−2	6	Qualification to Third place phase
3	FH	2	0	0	2	4	8	−4	0	Qualification to Fifth place phase
4	ÍBV	2	0	0	2	2	7	−5	0	Qualification to Seventh place phase

Updated to match(es) played on 5 January 2022. Source: https://www.ksi.is/mot/stakt-mot/?motnumer=43843

== Fotbolti.net Cup B ==
=== Group A ===
Pos	Team	Pld	W	D	L	GF	GA	GD	Pts	Qualification or relegation
1	Kórdrengir	0	0	0	0	0	0	0	0	Qualification to Final phase
2	Njarðvík	0	0	0	0	0	0	0	0	Qualification to Third place phase
3	Selfoss	0	0	0	0	0	0	0	0	Qualification to Fifth place phase
4	Þróttur Vogum	0	0	0	0	0	0	0	0	Qualification to Seventh place phase

Updated to match(es) played on 5 January 2022. Source:

=== Group B ===
Pos	Team	Pld	W	D	L	GF	GA	GD	Pts	Qualification or relegation
1	KV	1	1	0	0	3	2	+1	3	Qualification to Final phase
2	Grindavík	0	0	0	0	0	0	0	0	Qualification to Third place phase
3	Víkingur Reykjavík	0	0	0	0	0	0	0	0	Qualification to Fifth place phase
4	Afturelding	1	0	0	1	2	3	−1	0	Qualification to Seventh place phase

Updated to match(es) played on 5 January 2022. Source:

== Fotbolti.net Cup C ==
=== Group A ===
Pos	Team	Pld	W	D	L	GF	GA	GD	Pts	Qualification or relegation
1	Augnablik	0	0	0	0	0	0	0	0	Qualification to Final phase
2	Reynir	0	0	0	0	0	0	0	0	Qualification to Third place phase

Updated to match(es) played on 5 January 2022. Source:

=== Group B ===
Pos	Team	Pld	W	D	L	GF	GA	GD	Pts	Qualification or relegation
1	Haukar	0	0	0	0	0	0	0	0	Qualification to Final phase
2	Kári	0	0	0	0	0	0	0	0	Qualification to Third place phase

Updated to match(es) played on 5 January 2022. Source:
