= Stál-úlfur =

Sports club in Kópavogur, Iceland

- Sports: Basketball, Football, Volleyball
- Founded: 2010
- League: 2. deild karla (basketball); 4. deild karla (football)
- Based in: Kópavogur, Iceland
- Arena: Kórinn (basketball)
- Colours: green, white, gold
- Chairman: Algirdas Slapikas

Íþróttafélagið Stál-úlfur is a multi-sports club in Kópavogur, Iceland. They are currently field men's teams in basketball, volleyball and football. The club was founded in 2010 by Lithuanian immigrants in Iceland.

== Basketball ==
=== Notable players ===
Note: Flags indicate national team eligibility at FIBA-sanctioned events. Players may hold other non-FIBA nationalities not displayed.

Criteria

To appear in this section a player must have either:

- Set a club record or won an individual award while at the club
- Played at least one official international match for their national team at any time
- Played at least one official NBA match at any time.

- (Lithuania) Mantas Mockevičius

== Volleyball ==
In the 2022–2023 season, Stál-úlfur fielded a team in the top-tier Úrvalsdeild karla.
