= Fótbolti.net Cup =

Fótbolti.net Tournament
- Founded: 2011
- Region: Iceland
- Teams: 8
- Current champions: FH (1st title)
- Most championships: Breiðablik (3 titles)
- Broadcaster: SportTV

Fótbolti.net Cup is an annual pre-season tournament in Iceland. The tournament involves eight clubs from the top two leagues in Iceland, Úrvalsdeild and 1. deild, and uses a combination of group and knockout rounds to determine each team's final position in the competition. Matches begin in January, with the tournament concluding at the beginning of February.

FH are the defending champions, having defeated Stjarnan 4–2 on penalties, after the sides drew 2–2 in the 2017 final.

In December 2022, it was announced that the 2023 edition would not be played after the Association of League Referees terminated its cooperation with the tournament due to its dissatisfaction with the coverage of Fótbolti.net of their work, especially the way certain employees of the media have accused referees of dishonesty or outright cheating.

== Champions ==
=== By year ===
Finals by year
| Season | Winner | Runner-up | Third place |
|---|---|---|---|
| 2011 | Keflavík | ÍBV | ÍA |
| 2012 | Breiðablik | Stjarnan | Grindavík |
| 2013 | Breiðablik | Keflavík | FH |
| 2014 | Stjarnan | FH | Keflavík |
| 2015 | Breiðablik | Stjarnan | Keflavík |
| 2016 | ÍBV | KR | ÍA |
| 2017 | FH | Stjarnan | ÍBV |
| 2018 | Stjarnan | UMF Grindavík | Breiðablik |

=== B Deild ===
Finals by year
| Season | Winner | Runner-up | Third place |
|---|---|---|---|
| 2015 | UMF Víkingur Ólafsvík | HK Kópavogur | UMF Selfoss |
| 2016 | HK Kópavogur | Keflavík ÍF | Grótta |
| 2017 | HK Kópavogur | Afturelding | Grótta |
| 2018 | Grótta | Vestri | Njarðvík |

=== By club ===
A total of 6 clubs have appeared in the final, of whom 5 have won the competition. The most successful club in terms of wins and appearances in the final is Breiðablik with 3 wins from 3. Stjarnan have finished runners-up on more occasions than any other club with 3 defeats in the final. The most recent winner is FH, who defeated Stjarnan 4–2 on penalties, after the sides drew 2–2 in the 2017 final.

Final appearances by club
| Club | Wins | Last final won | Runners-up | Last final lost | Total final appearances |
|---|---|---|---|---|---|
| Breiðablik | 3 | 2015 | — | — | 3 |
| Stjarnan | 1 | 2014 | 3 | 2017 | 4 |
| Keflavík | 1 | 2011 | 1 | 2013 | 2 |
| ÍBV | 1 | 2016 | 1 | 2011 | 2 |
| FH | 1 | 2017 | 1 | 2014 | 2 |
| KR | — | — | 1 | 2016 | 1 |
