= Nichlas Rohde =

Danish footballer (born 1992)

Personal information
- Date of birth: 1 January 1992 (age 34)
- Place of birth: Roskilde, Denmark
- Position: Forward

Youth career
- Jyllinge FC
- Brøndby
- 2009–2011: Nordsjælland

Senior career*
Years	Team	Apps	(Gls)
2011–2014	Nordsjælland	5	(1)
2012	→ Breiðablik (loan)	10	(6)
2013–2014	→ Breiðablik (loan)	17	(5)
2014	→ AB (loan)	14	(7)
2014–2020	AB	117	(35)
2020–2021	B.1908	9	(3)
2021	Skovshoved	4	(1)
2021	Liria FK	5	(1)
- * Club domestic league appearances and goals

Nichlas Rohde (born 1 January 1992) is a Danish former professional footballer who played as a forward.

== Career ==
Born in Roskilde, Rohde started playing football at a youth level with Jyllinge FC, Ølstykke FC and Brøndby, until he was picked up by FC Nordsjælland in January 2009. He played the 2010–11 season for FCN's under-19 squad, helping the team to a 3rd-place finish, and ending the season as league top scorer with 20 goals.

Rohde made his league debut on 7 August 2011, coming on as a substitute for Matti Lund Nielsen against Silkeborg. He scored an equalizing goal within 12 minutes of coming off the bench, bringing the score to 1–1, FCN eventually winning the game 2–1. Having made two league appearances and one in Europe against Sporting Lisbon, Rohde was rewarded with a 3 1/2-year contract on 23 August 2011.

== Style of play ==
Rohde has been described as a mentally strong and direct attacker, who is brave when fighting for the ball.

== Career statistics ==
Appearances and goals by club, season and competition
Club	Season	League		Cup		Continental		Other		Total	
Club	Season	Apps	Goals	Apps	Goals	Apps	Goals	Apps	Goals	Apps	Goals
F.C. Nordsjælland	2011–12	5	1	1	0	2	0	0	0	8	1
Breiðablik (loan)	2012	10	6	0	0	0	0	0	0	10	6
Breiðablik (loan)	2013	17	6	4	3	6	0	2	0	29	9
Career total		32	13	5	3	8	0	2	0	47	16

== Honours ==
FC Nordsjælland

- Danish Superliga: 2011-12

Breiðablik

- Icelandic League Cup: 2013
- Úrvalsdeild runner-up: 2012
