= Fótbolti.net =

Icelandic football website

- Available in: Icelandic
- Owner: Fótbolti ehf.
- Editor: Elvar Geir Magnússon
- CEO: Maté Dalmay
- Website: fotbolti.net
- Launched: April 15, 2002; 24 years ago

Fótbolti.net is an Icelandic website that focuses on football. Headquartered in Reykjavík, it was founded in 2002 by Hafliði Breiðfjörð and quickly established itself as one of the most popular websites in Iceland.

== Ownership ==
Fótbolti ehf., the company behind the website was origilly 95% owned by Hafliði Breiðfjörð. The remaining 5% are owned by Magnús Már Einarsson. In March 2025, Maté Dalmay along with four others bought all shares in the company.
