= Halldór Orri Björnsson =

Icelandic footballer

Personal information
- Date of birth: 2 March 1987 (age 39)
- Place of birth: Reykjavík, Iceland
- Height: 1.85 m (6 ft 1 in)
- Position: Attacking midfielder

Youth career
- Stjarnan

Senior career*
Years	Team	Apps	(Gls)
2004–2013	Stjarnan	161	(58)
2010	→ SC Pfullendorf (loan)	7	(0)
2014	Falkenbergs FF	11	(0)
2015–2016	Stjarnan	40	(9)
2017–2019	FH	42	(3)
2020–2021	Stjarnan	27	(2)

International career
2012–2014	Iceland	2	(0)
- * Club domestic league appearances and goals

Halldór Orri Björnsson (born 2 March 1987) is an Icelandic retired footballer who played as a midfielder.

== Career ==
Halldór played club football in Iceland, Germany and Sweden for Stjarnan, SC Pfullendorf, Falkenbergs FF and FH.

He earned two international caps for Iceland between 2012 and 2014.

He retired from football in September 2021.
