= Norðurálsvöllurinn =

Multi-use stadium in Akranes, Iceland

Coordinates: 64°19′3.56″N 22°3′35.11″W

Akranesvöllur
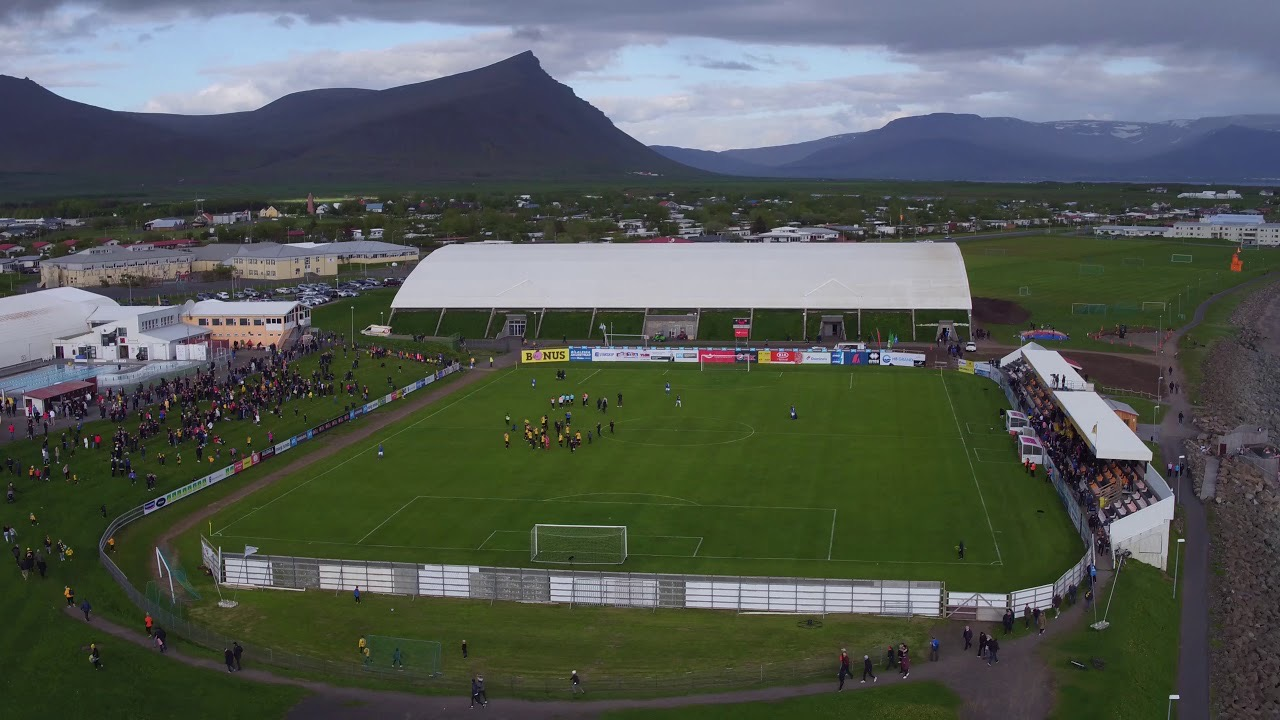
- Interactive map of Akranesvöllur
- Location: Akranes
- Capacity: 5550
- Surface: Grass

Construction
- Opened: 1935

Tenant
- ÍA

Akranesvöllur (Icelandic pronunciation: [ˈaːkraˌnɛsˌvœtlʏr̥], lit. 'Akranes Field' or more precisely 'Akranes Stadium') (Known as ELKEM völlurinn for sponsorship purposes) is a football stadium in Akranes, Iceland. It is currently used for football matches.

== Overview ==
The stadium is situated on the coastline of Akranes, overlooking both its adjacent beach and the cityscape of Reykjavik.

The stadium has a maximum capacity of 5,524. It has a maximum seat capacity of 1,812, but a section of "grassy terrace" allows that capacity to exceed to past that.

The stadium has a field size of 105m x 67m, of which it has natural grass surface.

== History ==
The stadium was built in 1935, and would only obtain its current tenants, Íþróttabandalag Akraness, until 1946.

In 2013, the stadium's naming rights were obtained by Norðurál; switching from its previous name of 'Akranesvöllur' to 'Norðurálsvöllurinn'.
