= Kórinn =

Auditorium in Kópavogur, Iceland

(Iceland) Kórinn
- Interactive map of (Iceland) Kórinn
- Location: Kópavogur, Iceland
- Coordinates: 64.0825912°N 21.8261433°W
- Capacity: 2,050

Construction
- Opened: 2007

Tenants
- HK; Augnablik; KM Reykjavik

Kórinn (Icelandic pronunciation: [ˈkʰouːrɪn]) is an indoor multipurpose auditorium located in Kópavogur and built in 2007. It includes an indoor football stadium which meets all the international standards set by the International Football Association FIFA.

The auditorium covers an area of 14,457 m^{2} and has a seating capacity of 2000 spectators plus an additional 50 honor places.

The auditorium is designed to accommodate concert acoustics and has a total standing capacity of up to 19,000 visitors.

Canadian recording artist, singer-songwriter Justin Bieber performed 2 sold-out shows at the arena on September 8 and 9, 2016 as a part of his Purpose World Tour.

In 2026, Icelandic musician Laufey performed 2 sold out shows at the arena on March 14 and 15 respectively as part of the European leg of the A Matter of Time Tour.
