= Steven Lennon =

Scottish footballer

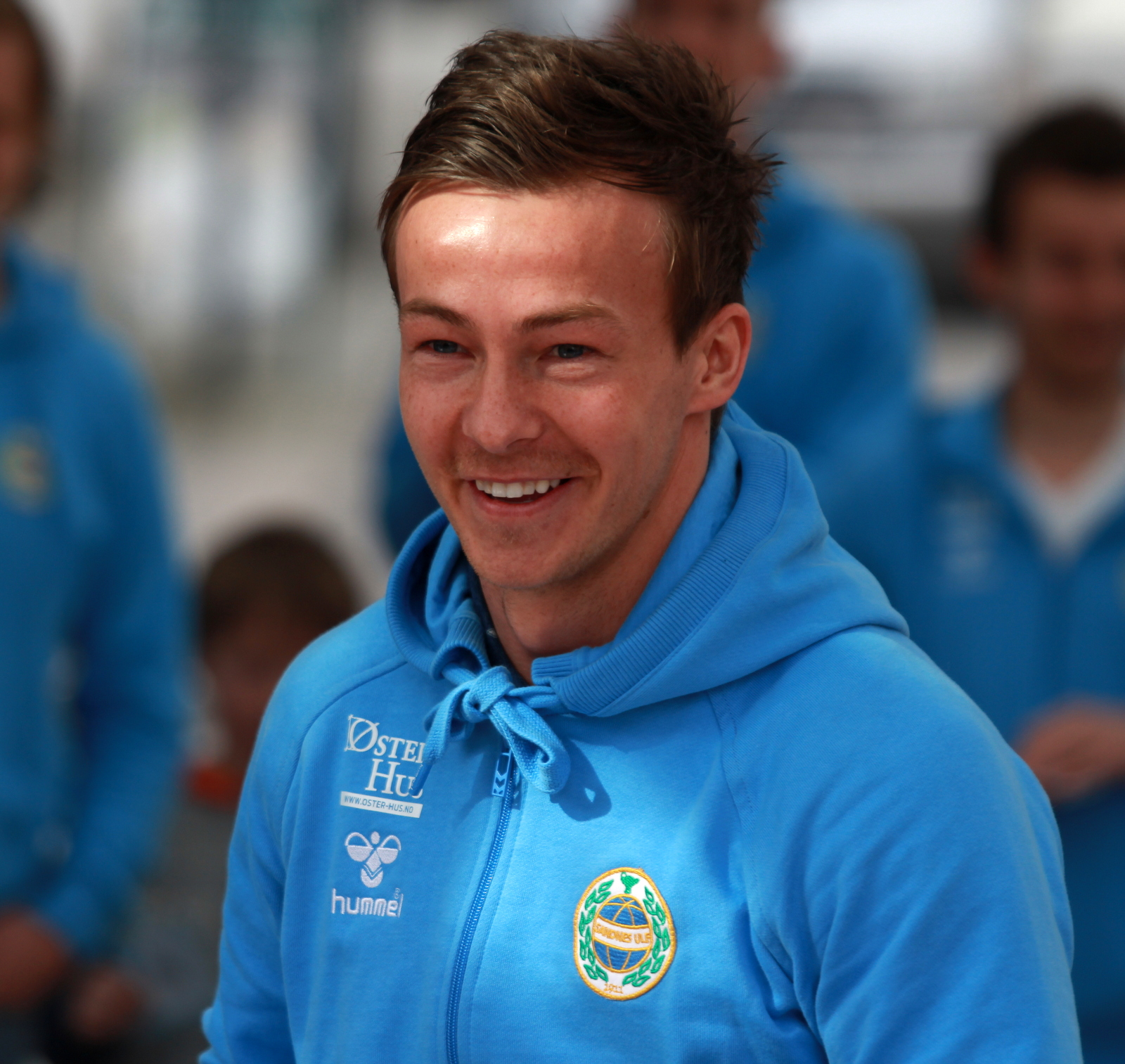
- Lennon in 2014

Personal information
- Full name: Steven Lennon
- Date of birth: 20 January 1988 (age 38)
- Place of birth: Irvine, Scotland
- Position: Striker

Team information
- Current team: Þróttur Reykjavík (loan)
- Number: 7

Senior career*
Years	Team	Apps	(Gls)
2006–2010	Rangers	3	(0)
2008–2009	→ Partick Thistle (loan)	8	(0)
2010	→ Lincoln City (loan)	19	(3)
2010	Dundalk	9	(0)
2011	Newport County	9	(0)
2011–2013	Fram	37	(14)
2013–2014	Sandnes Ulf	28	(3)
2014–2023	FH	176	(88)
2023–	→ Þróttur Reykjavík (loan)	6	(2)

International career^{‡}
2006–2007	Scotland U19	4	(0)
2008	Scotland U21	6	(0)
- * Club domestic league appearances and goals as of 10 November 2023 ‡ National team caps and goals as of 13:56, 1 February 2010 (UTC)

Steven Lennon (born 20 January 1988) is a Scottish footballer who plays as a forward for Þróttur Reykjavík, on loan from Besta-deild karla side FH.

He has previously played for Rangers, Partick Thistle, Lincoln City, Dundalk, Newport County, Fram Reykjavík and Sandnes Ulf.

== Career ==
=== Rangers ===
Lennon was born in Irvine, North Ayrshire. He started off his career as a midfielder but changed to a striker, becoming a regular for the Rangers reserve team. He made his debut for the Rangers first team in a Scottish Premier League match against Inverness on 27 December 2006, coming on as a substitute for Nacho Novo.

Lennon became known as a prolific goalscorer, scoring numerous goals for Rangers' under-19s in the 2006–07 season including a hat-trick in a 3–3 draw with Dundee United. He then scored a hat-trick in Rangers' 5–0 defeat of rivals Celtic in the Scottish Youth Cup final on 26 April 2007.

On 3 December 2007, Lennon signed a new contract that was to have seen him tied to the club until at least 2010.

Lennon joined Partick Thistle on loan on 16 August 2008. The deal lasted until 26 January 2009.

Lennon subsequently joined English club Lincoln City on loan on 1 February 2010. The loan deal covered the period until the end of the 2009–10 season. Lennon was offered a permanent deal at Lincoln at the end of the season and despite stating he would be delighted to sign for the Imps on a permanent basis, he complained that he could not find anywhere to live in the City and missed Chris Sutton's deadline. Sutton withdrew the offer and Lennon returned to Rangers, where he was released at the end of his contract.

=== Dundalk ===
In July 2010 Lennon signed for Dundalk until the end of the Irish season, although he broke his foot less than a month into the deal.

=== Newport County ===
In February 2011 Lennon signed for Newport County, where he was reunited with former Dundalk players Wayne Hatswell and Tom Miller. He rejected a contract offer in May 2011.

=== Fram Reykjavik ===
In July 2011 he joined Fram who play in Iceland's premier league Úrvalsdeild. He marked his debut for the club by scoring the only goal in their 1–0 victory at Víkingur on 18 July 2011. He signed a new one-year contract with the club in October 2012.

=== Sandnes Ulf ===
In July 2013 he joined Sandnes Ulf, agreeing a two-and-a-half-year contract with the club. The move arose after the club had been recommended to Lennon by his one-time Rangers teammate Thomas Kind Bendiksen.

=== FH ===
In July 2014, Lennon returned to the Úrvalsdeild, signing a three-year contract with FH.

== Career statistics ==
=== Club ===
As of match played 27 September 2020

Appearances and goals by club, season and competition
Club	Season	League			National Cup		League Cup		Continental		Other		Total	
Club	Season	Division	Apps	Goals	Apps	Goals	Apps	Goals	Apps	Goals	Apps	Goals	Apps	Goals
Rangers	2006–07	Scottish Premier League	3	0	0	0	0	0	0	0	-		3	0
Rangers	2007–08	Scottish Premier League	0	0	0	0	0	0	0	0	-		0	0
Rangers	2008–09	Scottish Premier League	0	0	0	0	0	0	0	0	-		0	0
Rangers	2009–10	Scottish Premier League	0	0	0	0	0	0	0	0	-		0	0
Rangers	Total		3	0	0	0	0	0	0	0	-	-	3	0
Partick Thistle (loan)	2008–09	Scottish First Division	8	0	0	0	1	0	–		–		9	0
Lincoln City (loan)	2009–10	League Two	19	3	0	0	0	0	–		–		19	3
Dundalk	2010	League of Ireland Premier Division	9	0	0	0	–		2	0	–		11	0
Newport County	2010–11	Conference	9	0	0	0	–		–		0	0	9	0
Fram	2011	Úrvalsdeild	12	6	0	0	0	0	-		-		12	6
Fram	2012	Úrvalsdeild	13	5	3	2	9	4	-		-		25	11
Fram	2013	Úrvalsdeild	12	3	3	1	3	0	-		-		18	4
Fram	Total		37	14	6	3	12	4	-	-	-	-	55	21
Sandnes Ulf	2013	Tippeligaen	13	1	0	0	-		-		-		13	1
Sandnes Ulf	2014	Tippeligaen	15	2	1	0	-		-		-		16	2
Sandnes Ulf	Total		28	3	1	0	-	-	-	-	-	-	29	3
FH	2014	Úrvalsdeild	10	6	0	0	0	0	2	1	-		12	7
FH	2015	Úrvalsdeild	18	9	3	3	8	4	2	1	-		31	17
FH	2016	Úrvalsdeild	20	6	4	3	6	0	2	1	1	0	33	10
FH	2017	Úrvalsdeild	22	15	4	1	7	2	6	1	1	0	40	19
FH	2018	Úrvalsdeild	21	9	2	0	0	0	4	1	0	0	27	10
FH	2019	Úrvalsdeild	19	13	4	5	0	0	0	0	0	0	23	18
FH	2020	Úrvalsdeild	18	17	3	2	0	0	1	0	0	0	22	19
FH	Total		128	75	20	14	21	6	17	5	2	0	188	100
Career total			241	95	27	17	34	10	19	5	2	0	323	127
