= 2014 Icelandic Cup =

Borgunarbikar

Tournament details
- Country: Iceland
- Teams: 72

Final positions
- Champions: KR (14th title)
- Runners-up: Keflavík

Tournament statistics
- Matches played: 54
- Goals scored: 272 (5.04 per match)

The 2014 Icelandic Cup, also known as Borgunarbikar for sponsorship reasons, was the 55th edition of the Icelandic national football cup. KR defeated Keflavík in the final to win the competition.

== First round ==
2 May 2014	Leiknir F.	4–2	Höttur	Fjarðabyggðarhöllin, Fjarðabyggð
21:00 CET	Bjartþórsson 63', 68'; Árnason 90'; Munoz Rodriguez 90+2'		Emilsson 73', 78'	Referee: Sveinn Þórður Þórðarson

3 May 2014	KFS	3–1	Grótta	Helgafellsvöllur, Vestmannaeyjar
14:00 CET	Ólafsson 48'; Þorvarðarson 65'; Guðmundsson 90'		Harðarson 37'	Referee: Snorri Páll Einarsson

3 May 2014	Árborg	1–1 (2–4 p)	Víðir	Selfossvöllur, Selfoss
16:00 CET	Sigurjónsson 61' (pen.)		Ármannsson 20'	Referee: Örvar Sær Gíslason

3 May 2014	Midas	1–2	Afturelding	Framvöllur, Reykjavík
16:00 CET	Hauksson 16'		Theódórsson 14'; Marteinsson 49'	Referee: Einar Ingi Jóhannsson

3 May 2014	Hamar	6–1	UMF Snæfell	Grýluvöllur, Hveragerði
16:00 CET	Kjartansson 30', 54', 90+1'; Hassing 45', 70'; Björgvinsson 81'		Sigurbjörnsson 57' (pen.)	Referee: Sigurður Ingi Magnússon

3 May 2014	Völsungur	11–0	Nökkvi	Húsavíkurvöllur, Húsavík
16:00 CET	Jónmundsson 11'; Odrobéna 19', 62'; Einarsson 22'; Friðriksson 36', 82', 83'; Jósteinsson 47'; Kristjánsson 61'; Smárason 63', 89'			Referee: Jan Eric Jessen

3 May 2014	KH	6–3	Kóngarnir	Hlíðarendi, Reykjavík
16:00 CET	Sigurðsson 8'; Georgsson 9', 42'; Eiríksson 62', 63'; Þorvaldsson 90'		Ormslev 31'; Gústavsson 75'; Heimisson 90+1'	Referee: Jóhann Atli Hafliðason

3 May 2014	KFR	2–0	UMF Alftanes	SS-völlurinn
16:00 CET	Axelsson 87'; Ármannsson 90+4'			Referee: Pétur Guðmundsson

3 May 2014	Augnablik	7–1	Léttir	Fagrilundur, Reykjavík
16:00 CET	Valgeirsson 2'; Bergs 16'; Eggertsson 26', 53'; Guðmundsson 65'; Sveinsson 69'; Jónsson 77'		Ólafsson 33'	Referee: Erlendur Eiríksson

3 May 2014	Fjarðabyggð	5–1	Einherji	Norðfjarðarvöllur, Neskaupstaður
16:00 CET	Jónasson 6'; A. Jónasson 9', 25', 53'; Jónsson 17'		Sigurðsson 34'	Referee: Jóhann Óskar Þórólfsson

3 May 2014	Elliði	2–1	Örninn	Fylkisvöllur, Reykjavík
16:00 CET	Teitsson 77'; Einarsson 90+2'		Silva Santos 70'	Referee: Jóhann Ingi Jónsson

3 May 2014	UMF Njarðvík	3–1	KB	Njarðtaksvöllurinn, Njarðvík
16:00 CET	Grudzinski 33'; Kjartansson 47'; Róbertsson 72'		Geirsson 38'	Referee: Aðalbjörn Heiðar Þorsteinsson

3 May 2014	Kría	1–3	Vængir Júpiters	Gróttuvöllur, Seltjarnarnes
16:00 CET	Ali Khan 8'		Ásgeirsson 15'; Hákonarson 89' (pen.); Skaptason 90'	Referee: Valdimar Pálsson

3 May 2014	Skínandi	11–0	Afríka	Samsung völlurinn, Garðabær
17:00 CET	Björnsson 19', 29', 57', 74', 88', 90'; Örvarsson 50'; Hansen 59', 78' (pen.); G. Kristinsson 89'; A. Kristinsson 90+1'			Referee: Steinar Stephensen

3 May 2014	Magni	9–1	Hamrarnir/Vinir	KA-völlur, Akureyri
18:00 CET	Björnsson 13' (o.g.); Jessen 16', 51'; Halldórsson 49', 82', 90'; Magnússon 54'; Rúnarsson 62'; Baldvinsson 90+2'		Jóhannsson 4'	Referee: Vilhelm Adolfsson

3 May 2014	Stokkseyri	0–1	Ármann	Selfossvöllur, Selfoss
18:30 CET			Böðvarsson 6' (o.g.)	Referee: Estanislao Plantada Siurans

3 May 2014	Grundarfjörður	5–1	Vatnaliljur	Akraneshöllin, Akranes
19:00 CET	Hjartarson 14', 37'; Guðmundsson 23'; Einarsson 86'; Viðarsson 89'		Harðarson 35'	Referee: Valgeir Valgeirsson

3 May 2014	ÍH	3–1	Ísbjörninn	Schenkervöllurinn, Hafnarfjörður
19:00 CET	Kúld 11', 43'; Ástþórsson 88'		Marinósson 86'	Referee: Jónas Geirsson

3 May 2014	KFG	4–0	Gnúpverjar	Samsung völlurinn, Garðabær
21:00 CET	Kristjánsson 5'; Ívarsson 25', 37'; Pálmason 84'			Referee: Gunnar Helgason

Skallagrímur	w/o	Kári Akranes

4 May 2014	Stál-úlfur	0–8	Þróttur Vogum	Kórinn, Kópavogur
14:00 CET			Valsson 1', 16'; Guðmundsson 5'; Símonarson 8'; Brynjarsson 83', 86', 89'; Wissler 88'	Referee: Gunnar Helgason

4 May 2014	Reynir S.	2–3	Ægir	N1-völlurinn, Sandgerði
16:00 CET	Þorsteinsson 66', 72'		Hallsson 59'; Matejic 77', 83'

4 May 2014	Hvíti Riddarinn	1–4 (a.e.t.)	ÍR	Tungubakkavöllur, Mosfellsbær
16:00 CET	Eyþórsson 32'		Magnússon 65'; Björnsson 102', 120'; Harðarson 105' (o.g.)	Referee: Halldór Breiðfjörð Jóhannsson

4 May 2014	Lumman	3–6	Berserkir	Kórinn, Kópavogur
17:00 CET	Magnússon 44'; Sæmundsson 46'; Kristinsson 90'		Sigurðsson 5'; D. Sigurðarson 12'; Guðnason 67', 88'; Ágústsson 77'; Briem 86'	Referee: Andri Vigfússon

== Second round ==
13 May 2014	Berserkir	2–8	BÍ/Bolungarvík	Víkingsvöllur, Reykjavík
18:00	Sigurðsson 65'; Ágústsson 85'		Spear 10' (pen.), 26', 69', 73', 90'; Bjarnason 54', 63', 64'

13 May 2014	Kári Akranes	0–4	KV	KR-Völlur, Reykjavík
18:00			Lúðvíksson 25'; Leifsson 38', 76'; Gíslason 61'

13 May 2014	Hamar	1–0	KFR	Grýluvöllur, Hveragerði
18:45	Kjartansson 22'			Attendance: 40; Referee: Jóhann Ingi Jónsson

13 May 2014	Ægir Þorlákshöfn	0–4	Afturelding	Þorlákshafnarvöllur, Þorlákshöfn
19:15			Marteinsson 20'; Vignisson 28'; Helgason 52'; Órmarsson 58'

13 May 2014	Ellidi	0–2	Haukar	Fylkisvöllur, Reykjavík
19:15			Birgisson 39' (pen.)

13 May 2014	KA Akureyri	7–0	Magni	Akureyrarvöllur, Akureyri
19:15	Jóhannesson 16', 20', 78' þórarinsson 34', 81'; Steingrímsson 39'; Buinickij 45+1'

13 May 2014	KH	1–3	Selfoss	Hlíðarendi, Reykjavík
19:15	Sigurðsson 90+3'		Barros 37', 44'; Einarsson 86'

13 May 2014	Leiknir Fáskrúdsfjördur	1–3	Fjarðabyggð	Búđagrund, Fáskrúðsfjörður
19:15	Rodriguez 76'		Eysteinsson 23'; Sófusson 32', 61'

13 May 2014	Leiknir Reykjavík	1–3	ÍR	Leiknisvöllur, Reykjavík
19:15	Bjarni 10'		Sveinsson 43'; Ström 70'

13 May 2014	Skínandi	0–4	Víðir	Samsung Völlurinn, Garðabær
19:15			Palmason 30'; Sigurðsson 41'; Jónsson 81'; Hólmbergsson 90'

13 May 2014	Thróttur Reykjavík	5–0	KFS Vestmennaeyjar	Valbjarnarvöllur, Reykjavík
19:15	Bergsteinsson 4' (o.g.); Pétursson 7'; Eliason 39'; Hauksson 61'; Jakobsson 85'

13 May 2014	Thróttur Vogar	3–4 (a.e.t.)	KFG Gardabær	Vogabæjarvöllur, Vogar
19:15	Guðmundsson 45'; Símonarson 71', 71'		Pálmason 45'; Ingason 45'; Símonarson 85' (o.g.)

13 May 2014	UMF Grindavík	4–1	ÍA Akranes	Grindavíkurvöllur, Grindavík
19:15	Grizelj 4', 37'; Björgvinsson 76', 78'		Hjartarson 60'

13 May 2014	UMF Sindri Höfn	4–3 (a.e.t.)	Huginn	Sindravellir, Höfn
19:15	Kárason 11'; Ceho 79'; Hasecic 84'; Haraldsson 110'		Alvaro 48'; Nikolić 57', 73'

13 May 2014	Vængir Júpiters	0–3	Augnablik	Fjölnisvöllur Gervigras, Reykjavík
19:15			Steinþórsson 9' (pen.); Guðmundsson 31' (o.g.); Bergs 84'

13 May 2014	KF Fjallabyggð	2–0	Völsungur	Ólafsfjarđarvöllur, Ólafsfjörður
20:30	Gunnarsson 61'; Reynisson 84'

13 May 2014	Víkingur Ólafsvík	0–2	HK	Ólafsvíkurvöllur, Ólafsvík
20:30			Magnússon 54'; Lárusson 90+2'

14 May 2014	Tindastóll	1–2	Dalvík/Reynir	Sauđárkróksvöllur, Sauðárkrókur
19:15	Gunnlaugarson 52'		Ólafsson 11'; Auðunsson 38' (pen.)

14 May 2014	Grundarfjördur	2–6	Njarðvík	Grundarfjarđarvöllir, Grundarfjörður
20:00	Einarsson 68'; Valgeirsson 73'		Jóhannesson 43', 55'; Svansson 48'; Sigurðsson 60' (pen.), 63' (pen.); Róbertsson 90'

14 May 2014	ÍH	1–0	Ármann	Kaplakrikavöllur, Hafnarfjörður
20:30	Magnússon 20'

== Third round ==
26 May 2014	HK	1–2	Breiðablik	Kórinn, Kópavogur
21:15	Magnússon 74'		Vilhjálmsson 65'; Halsman 80'	Referee: Vilhjálmur Alvar Thórarinsson

27 May 2014	Fram	1–0	KA	Framvöllur Úlfarsárdal, Reykjavík
19:30	Thorláksson 67'			Referee: Kristinn Jakobsson

27 May 2014	ÍBV	3–0	Haukar	Hásteinsvöllur, Vestmannaeyjar
20:00	Gudjónsson 14'; Þorvarðarson 41', 76' (pen.)			Referee: Valgeir Valgeirsson

27 May 2014	Sindri Höfn	0–2	KV	Sindravellir, Höfn
20:00			Lúðvíksson 3'; Leifsson 56'	Referee: Jóhann Atli Haflidason

27 May 2014	ÍH	1–5	Þór Akureyri	Kaplakriki, Hafnarfjörður
21:00	Guðmundsson 16'		Jónsson 3', 90+3'; Björnsson 37'; Birgisson 80'; Ævarsson 90+1'	Referee: Adalbjörn Heidar Thorsteinsson

27 May 2014	Víðir	0–1	Valur	Garðskagavöllur, Garður
21:15			Þorláksson 81'	Referee: Jan Eric Jessen

27 May 2014	Fylkir	3–1	UMF Njarðvík	Fylkisvöllur, Reykjavík
21:15	Sveinsson 62'; Björnsson 66'; Benediktsson 73'		Rúnarsson 13'	Referee: Thoroddur Hjaltalin

27 May 2014	Hamar	3–2	KF	Grýluvöllur, Hveragerði
21:15	Björgvinsson 53' (pen.); Kjartansson 55', 71'		Beslija 65', 88'	Referee: Örvar Sær Gíslason

28 May 2014	Stjarnan	6–0	UMF Selfoss	Samsung völlurinn, Garðabær
20:00	Sturluson 3', 64'; Finsen 15', 67'; Præst Møller 57'; Pálsson 84'			Referee: Gardar Hinriksson

28 May 2014	Fjölnir	1–0	Dalvík/Reynir	Egilshöll, Reykjavík
21:15	Tsonis 39'			Referee: Thorvaldur Arnason

28 May 2014	BÍ/Bolungarvík	4–2	Fjarðabyggð	Torfnesvöllur, Ísafjörður
21:15	Tubæk 26' (pen.), 46'; Bjarnason 51'; Pachipis 53'		Sófusson 19'; Pálmasson 70' (pen.)	Referee: Ívar Orri Kristjánsson

28 May 2014	Afturelding	1–1 (a.e.t.) (4–5 p)	ÍR	N1-völlurinn Varmá, Mosfellsbær
21:15	Davorsson 13'		Sigthorsson 57'	Referee: Petur Gudmundsson
	Penalties
	Sigurðsson (penalty scored); Jónsson (penalty scored); Vignisson (penalty scored); Davorsson (penalty scored)		Haraldsson (penalty scored); Sveinsson (penalty scored); Magnússon (penalty scored); Segatta (penalty scored); Halldórsson (penalty scored)

28 May 2014	KR	1–0	FH	KR-völlur, Reykjavík
21:15	Sigurðsson 38'			Referee: Gunnar Jarl Jónsson

28 May 2014	Víkingur Reykjavík	4–1 (a.e.t.)	UMF Grindavík	Víkingsvöllur, Reykjavík
22:30	Sverrisson 19'; Hristov 95'; Þrándarson 108'; Faye 111'		Mišura 4'	Referee: Erlendur Eiriksson

28 May 2014	KFG	0–4	Þróttur Reykjavík	Samsung völlurinn, Garðabær
22:30			Sigurðsson 9' (pen.), 41', 86'; Sigurðsson 12'	Referee: Halldór Breidfjörd Jóhannsson

28 May 2014	Augnablik	0–5	Keflavík ÍF	Versalavöllur, Kópavogur
22:30			Halldórsson 5', 10'; Elvarsson 16'; Þorsteinsson 47', 54'	Referee: Valdimar Pálsson

== Fourth round ==
17 June 2014	BÍ/Bolungarvík	5–2 (a.e.t.)	ÍR	Torfnesvöllur, Ísafjörður
18:00	Stefánsson 1', 94', 111', 116'; Mbang Ondo 90+1'		Hróbjartsson 44'; Hróðmarsson 72'	Referee: Erlendur Eiriksson

18 June 2014	ÍBV Vestmannaeyjar	3–0	Valur	Hásteinsvöllur, Vestmannaeyjar
21:00	Lúdvíksson 47' (o.g.); Glenn 53', 81'			Referee: Ívar Orri Kristjánsson

18 June 2014	KV	3–5	Fram Reykjavík	Egilshöll, Reykjavík
22:15	Leifsson 39'; Gíslason 82'; Jónasson 90+2'		Baldvinsson 6'; Albertsson 43' (pen.); Þorláksson 63', 73', 76'	Referee: Valdimar Pálsson

18 June 2014	Víkingur Reykjavík	5–1	Fylkir	Víkingsvöllur, Reykjavík
22:15	Gudmundsson 7'; Kristinsson 11', 22'; Jónsson 78'; Þrándarson 88'		Sousa 28'	Referee: Vilhjálmur Alvar Thórarinsson

18 June 2014	Stjarnan	0–1 (a.e.t.)	Þróttur Reykjavík	Samsung völlurinn, Garðabær
22:15			Eliason 93'	Referee: Guðmundur Arnar Guðmundsson

19 June 2014	Keflavík ÍF	6–1	Hamar	Nettóvöllurinn, Keflavík
23:00	Freysson 13'; Þorsteinsson 22', 52', 85'; Einarsson 70'; Halldórsson 90+3'		Kjartansson 76'

19 June 2014	KR	4–2	Fjölnir	KR-völlur, Reykjavík
23:00	Sigurðarson 34'; Martin 41', 60'; Balbi 74'		Guðjónsson 39'; Guðmundsson 56'

19 June 2014	Breiðablik	3–1 (a.e.t.)	Þór Akureyri	Kópavogsvöllur, Kópavogur
23:00	Lýðsson 63'; Helgason 99'; Vilhjálmsson 114'		Hannesson 71'

== Quarter-finals ==
6 July 2014	Fram Reykjavík	1–3	Keflavík ÍF	Laugardalsvöllur, Reykjavík
22:15	Takefusa 90+1'		Sveinsson 23'; Magnússon 58'; Matthíasson 75'

6 July 2014	Breiðablik	0–2	KR	Kópavogsvöllur, Kópavogur
23:00			Hauksson 14'; Sigurðsson 34'

7 July 2014	BÍ/Bolungarvík	0–3	Víkingur Reykjavík	Torfnesvöllur, Ísafjörður
21:00			Snorrason 54'; Jónsson 60', 90+1'

7 July 2014	Þróttur Reykjavík	0–1 (a.e.t.)	ÍBV Vestmannaeyjar	Valbjarnarvöllur, Reykjavík
21:00			Jeffs 113'

== Semi-finals ==
30 July 2014	Keflavík ÍF	0–0 (a.e.t.) (4–2 p)	Víkingur Reykjavík	Nettóvöllurinn, Keflavík
21:15				Attendance: 930; Referee: Þorvaldur Árnason
	Penalties
	Guðmundsson (penalty scored); Ljubičić (penalty scored); Ómarsson (penalty scored); Guðmundsson (penalty scored)		Magnússon (penalty scored); Jónsson (penalty scored)

31 July 2014	ÍBV Vestmannaeyjar	2–5	KR	Hásteinsvöllur, Vestmannaeyjar
20:00	Glenn 47'; Ólafsson 86'		Finnbogason 31', 64'; Sigurðsson 45'; Balbi 76'; Hauksson 83'	Referee: Gunnar Jarl Jónsson

== Final ==
16 August 2014	KR	2–1	Keflavík	Laugardalsvöllur, Reykjavík
16:00	Sigurðsson 17'; Finnbogason 90+1'	Report	Sveinsson 13'	Attendance: 4,694; Referee: Garðar Örn Hinriksson
