= 2014 1. deild karla =

1. deild karla
- Season: 2014
- Champions: Leiknir R
- Promoted: Leiknir; ÍA
- Relegated: KV; Tindastóll
- Matches: 132
- Goals: 421 (3.19 per match)
- Top goalscorer: 19 Goals: Garðar Gunnlaugsson
- Biggest home win: Grindavík 5-1 Tindastóll; Víkingur Ó 5-1 KV
- Biggest away win: BÍ/Bolungarvík 0-6 ÍA; Selfoss 0-6 HK
- Highest scoring: Tindastóll 4-6 BÍ/Bolungarvík

The 2014 1. deild karla (English: Men's First Division) was the 60th season of second-tier Icelandic football. Twelve teams contested the league; play began on 9 May and was concluded on 20 September. Leiknir R were crowned champions on 20. Sept 2014 for the first time and earned their first ever promotion to Úrvalsdeild.

== Teams ==
The league will be contested by twelve clubs. Eight remained in the division from the 2013 season, while four new clubs joined the 1. deild karla:

- ÍA and Víkingur Ólafsvík were relegated from the 2013 Úrvalsdeild, replacing Fjölnir and Víkingur Reykjavík who were promoted to the 2014 Úrvalsdeild
- HK and KV were promoted from the 2013 2. deild karla, in place of KF and Völsungur who were relegated to the 2014 2. deild karla

=== Club information ===
Location of teams in the 2014 1. deild karla

Team	Location	Stadium	2013 season
BÍ/Bolungarvík	Ísafjörður/Bolungarvík	Torfnesvöllur	5th
Grindavík	Grindavík	Grindavíkurvöllur	4th
Haukar	Hafnarfjörður	Schenkervöllurinn	3rd
HK	Kópavogur	Kópavogsvöllur	2. deild, 1st
ÍA	Akranes	Akranesvöllur	Úrvalsdeild, 12th
KA	Akureyri	Akureyrarvöllur	6th
KV	Reykjavík	KR-völlur	2. deild, 2nd
Leiknir R.	Reykjavík	Leiknisvöllur	7th
Selfoss	Selfoss	Selfossvöllur	8th
Tindastóll	Sauðárkrókur	Sauðárkróksvöllur	9th
Víkingur Ó.	Ólafsvík	Ólafsvíkurvöllur	Úrvalsdeild, 11th
Þróttur R.	Reykjavík	Valbjarnarvöllur	10th

== League table ==
Pos	Team	Pld	W	D	L	GF	GA	GD	Pts	Promotion or relegation
1	Leiknir R. (C, P)	22	14	6	2	43	19	+24	48	Promotion to the 2015 Úrvalsdeild
2	ÍA (P)	22	14	1	7	46	24	+22	43	Promotion to the 2015 Úrvalsdeild
3	Þróttur R.	22	11	4	7	35	27	+8	37	
4	Víkingur Ó.	22	11	3	8	38	32	+6	36	
5	Grindavík	22	10	5	7	39	24	+15	35	
6	HK	22	9	7	6	34	28	+6	34	
7	Haukar	22	9	5	8	37	32	+5	32	
8	KA	22	8	7	7	42	33	+9	31	
9	Selfoss	22	7	5	10	24	33	−9	26	
10	BÍ/Bolungarvík	22	7	4	11	34	45	−11	25	
11	KV (R)	22	5	3	14	34	53	−19	18	Relegation to the 2015 2. deild karla
12	Tindastóll (R)	22	0	4	18	15	71	−56	4	Relegation to the 2015 2. deild karla

Updated to match(es) played on 4 October 2014. Source:
Rules for classification: 1) points; 2) goal difference; 3) number of goals scored.
(C) Champions; (P) Promoted; (R) Relegated

== Results grid ==
Each team plays every opponent once home and away for a total of 22 matches per club, and 132 matches altogether.

Home \ Away	BÍB	GRI	HAU	HK	ÍA	KAK	KV	LRE	SEL	TIN	VÓL	ÞRÓ
BÍ/Bolungarvík		1–1	3–2	1–2	0–6	1–3	0–5	2–3	2–1	4–0	1–1	1–2
Grindavík	3–0		1–1	1–2	3–2	4–1	2–0	2–2	4–1	5–1	0–1	1–1
Haukar	3–1	1–0		4–1	1–3	0–3	3–2	2–3	1–1	1–1	2–1	1–4
HK	1–0	1–2	1–1		2–1	1–1	1–1	2–2	1–1	2–1	4–2	0–0
ÍA	1–0	2–0	0–2	2–0		2–4	0–1	2–1	1–0	5–2	2–3	3–1
KA	1–1	1–2	0–0	1–2	2–2		5–3	0–0	2–0	4–0	2–3	0–1
KV	0–3	3–2	1–4	2–3	0–2	2–2		0–1	1–3	3–2	3–2	1–3
Leiknir R.	2–0	1–0	2–0	3–2	0–1	2–1	2–1		1–1	4–0	2–0	2–1
Selfoss	0–1	0–0	0–2	0–6	0–1	2–4	3–1	2–2		3–0	0–2	0–1
Tindastóll	4–6	0–3	0–5	0–0	0–5	0–2	2–2	0–5	0–2		0–3	2–2
Víkingur Ólafsvík	2–4	0–2	3–1	1–0	1–3	2–2	5–1	0–0	0–1	1–0		2–1
Þróttur Reykjavík	2–2	2–1	1–0	1–0	0–1	3–1	3–1	0–3	1–2	4–0	1–3	

Updated to match(es) played on unknown. Source:
Legend: Blue = home team win; Yellow = draw; Red = away team win.

== Top goalscorers ==
As of 18 October 2014.

Rank	Player	Club	Goals	Matches	Ratio
1	Garðar Bergmann Gunnlaugsson	ÍA	19	21	0.90
2	Sindri Björnsson	Leiknir R	13	21	0.62
3	Eyþór Helgi Birgisson	Víkingur Ó	11	18	0.61
4=	Arsenij Buinickij	KA	10	21	0.48
4=	Guðmundur Atli Steinþórsson	HK	10	21	0.48
6	Hilmar Árni Halldórsson	Leiknir R	10	22	0.45
7	Hilmar Rafn Emilsson	Haukar	9	14	0.64
8	Viktor Unnar Illugason	HK	9	20	0.45
9	Hallgrímur Mar Steingrímsson	KA	9	21	0.43
10	Juraj Grizelj	Grindavík	8	19	0.42
