= 2015 1. deild karla =

1. deild karla
- Season: 2015
- Champions: Víkingur Ólafsvík (1st title)
- Promoted: Víkingur Ólafsvík; Þróttur Reykjavík
- Relegated: BÍ/Bolungarvík; Grótta
- Matches: 132
- Goals: 400 (3.03 per match)
- Top goalscorer: Björgvin Stefánsson (20 goals)
- Biggest home win: Þróttur Reykjavík 5–0 BÍ/Bolungarvík) (16 May 2015); Þór 6–1 BÍ/Bolungarvík) (29 July 2015); Grindavík 5–0 Selfoss) (6 August 2015); Grindavík 7–2 Fram) (19 September 2015)
- Biggest away win: Grindavík 2–7 Víkingur Ólafsvík) (1 September 2015)
- Highest scoring: Grindavík 2–7 Víkingur Ólafsvík) (1 September 2015); Grindavík 7–2 Fram) (19 September 2015)

The 2015 1. deild karla (English: Men's First Division) was the 61st season of second-tier Icelandic football. Twelve teams contested the league which began on 8 May and concluded on 19 September.

== Teams ==
The league was contested by twelve clubs. Eight remained in the division from the 2014 season, while four new clubs joined the 1. deild karla:

- Fram and Þór were relegated from the 2014 Úrvalsdeild, replacing Leiknir R. and ÍA who were promoted to the 2015 Úrvalsdeild.
- Fjarðabyggð and Grótta were promoted from the 2014 2. deild karla, in place of KV and Tindastóll who were relegated to the 2015 2. deild karla.

=== Club information ===
Location of teams in the 2016 1. deild karla

Team	Location	Stadium	2014 season
BÍ/Bolungarvík	Ísafjörður/Bolungarvík	Torfnesvöllur	10th
Fjarðabyggð	Fjarðabyggð	Eskjuvöllur	2. deild, 1st
Fram	Reykjavík	Framvöllur - Úlfarsárdal	Úrvalsdeild, 11th
Grindavík	Grindavík	Grindavíkurvöllur	5th
Grótta	Seltjarnarnes	Gróttuvöllur	2. deild, 2nd
Haukar	Hafnarfjörður	Schenkervöllurinn	7th
HK	Kópavogur	Kópavogsvöllur	6th
KA	Akureyri	Akureyrarvöllur	8th
Selfoss	Selfoss	Selfossvöllur	9th
Víkingur Ó.	Ólafsvík	Ólafsvíkurvöllur	4th
Þór	Akureyri	Þórsvöllur	Úrvalsdeild, 12th
Þróttur R.	Reykjavík	Valbjarnarvöllur	3rd

== League table ==
Pos	Team	Pld	W	D	L	GF	GA	GD	Pts	Promotion or relegation
1	Víkingur Ó. (C, P)	22	17	3	2	53	14	+39	54	Promotion to the 2016 Úrvalsdeild
2	Þróttur R. (P)	22	14	2	6	45	21	+24	44	Promotion to the 2016 Úrvalsdeild
3	KA	22	12	5	5	42	22	+20	41	
4	Þór	22	12	2	8	40	34	+6	38	
5	Grindavík	22	11	3	8	41	30	+11	36	
6	Haukar	22	10	4	8	32	28	+4	34	
7	Fjarðabyggð	22	9	4	9	35	37	−2	31	
8	HK	22	10	1	11	26	33	−7	31	
9	Fram	22	5	6	11	34	45	−11	21	
10	Selfoss	22	5	5	12	20	38	−18	20	
11	Grótta (R)	22	4	3	15	10	39	−29	15	Relegation to the 2016 2. deild karla
12	BÍ/Bolungarvík (R)	22	2	4	16	22	59	−37	10	Relegation to the 2016 2. deild karla

Updated to match(es) played on 19 September 2015. Source:
Rules for classification: 1) points; 2) goal difference; 3) number of goals scored.
(C) Champions; (P) Promoted; (R) Relegated

== Results grid ==
Each team plays every opponent once home and away for a total of 22 matches per club; 132 matches altogether.

Home \ Away	BÍB	KFF	FRA	GRI	GRÓ	HAU	HK	KAK	SEL	VÓL	ÞÓR	ÞRÓ
BÍ/Bolungarvík		2–2	1–2	1–3	2–1	2–2	2–1	0–4	2–2	1–5	1–3	1–4
Fjarðabyggð	3–0		3–3	0–3	2–3	2–0	0–4	0–1	2–0	1–0	2–2	1–0
Fram	3–1	0–1		1–1	4–1	3–0	1–2	1–1	1–2	0–4	2–3	1–0
Grindavík	1–0	1–3	7–2		2–0	2–2	2–0	2–1	5–0	2–7	1–2	0–1
Grótta	2–1	0–3	0–0	1–0		1–3	0–2	0–1	0–0	0–0	0–1	0–5
Haukar	2–2	3–1	2–1	1–0	4–0		2–0	2–1	3–0	0–2	1–0	1–2
Handknattleiksfélag Kópavogs	2–1	1–3	1–0	0–2	1–0	2–0		3–2	4–0	0–2	2–3	0–3
KA	2–0	2–1	3–3	1–3	1–0	3–1	3–0		2–2	1–1	1–0	4–1
Selfoss	2–0	2–2	2–1	1–1	2–0	0–1	0–1	0–4		0–2	2–3	2–0
Víkingur Ólafsvík	2–1	6–2	4–0	2–0	4–0	1–0	3–0	0–0	1–0		2–1	3–2
Þór A.	6–1	2–0	4–3	2–3	0–1	2–1	0–0	0–3	2–1	1–2		2–1
Þróttur Reykjavík	5–0	2–1	2–2	2–0	1–0	1–1	4–0	2–1	1–0	2–0	4–1	

Updated to match(es) played on 19 September 2015. Source:
Legend: Blue = home team win; Yellow = draw; Red = away team win.

== Top goalscorers ==
As of 8 March 2016

Rank	Player	Club	Goals
1	(Iceland) Björgvin Stefánsson	Haukar	20
2	(Iceland) Viktor Jónsson	Þróttur R.	19
3	(Iceland) Guðmundur Atli Steinþórsson	HK	14
4	(Croatia) Hrvoje Tokić	Víkingur Ó.	12
4	(Iceland) Elfar Árni Aðalsteinsson	KA	12
4	(Iceland) Alfreð Már Hjaltalín	Víkingur Ó.	12
7	(Iceland) Jóhann Helgi Hannesson	Þór	11
8	(Iceland) Ævar Ingi Jóhannesson	KA	9
8	(Iceland) Brynjar Jónasson	Fjarðabyggð	9
10	(Brazil) William Dominguez da Silva	Víkingur Ó.	8
