= Aron Sigurðarson =

Icelandic footballer (born 1993)

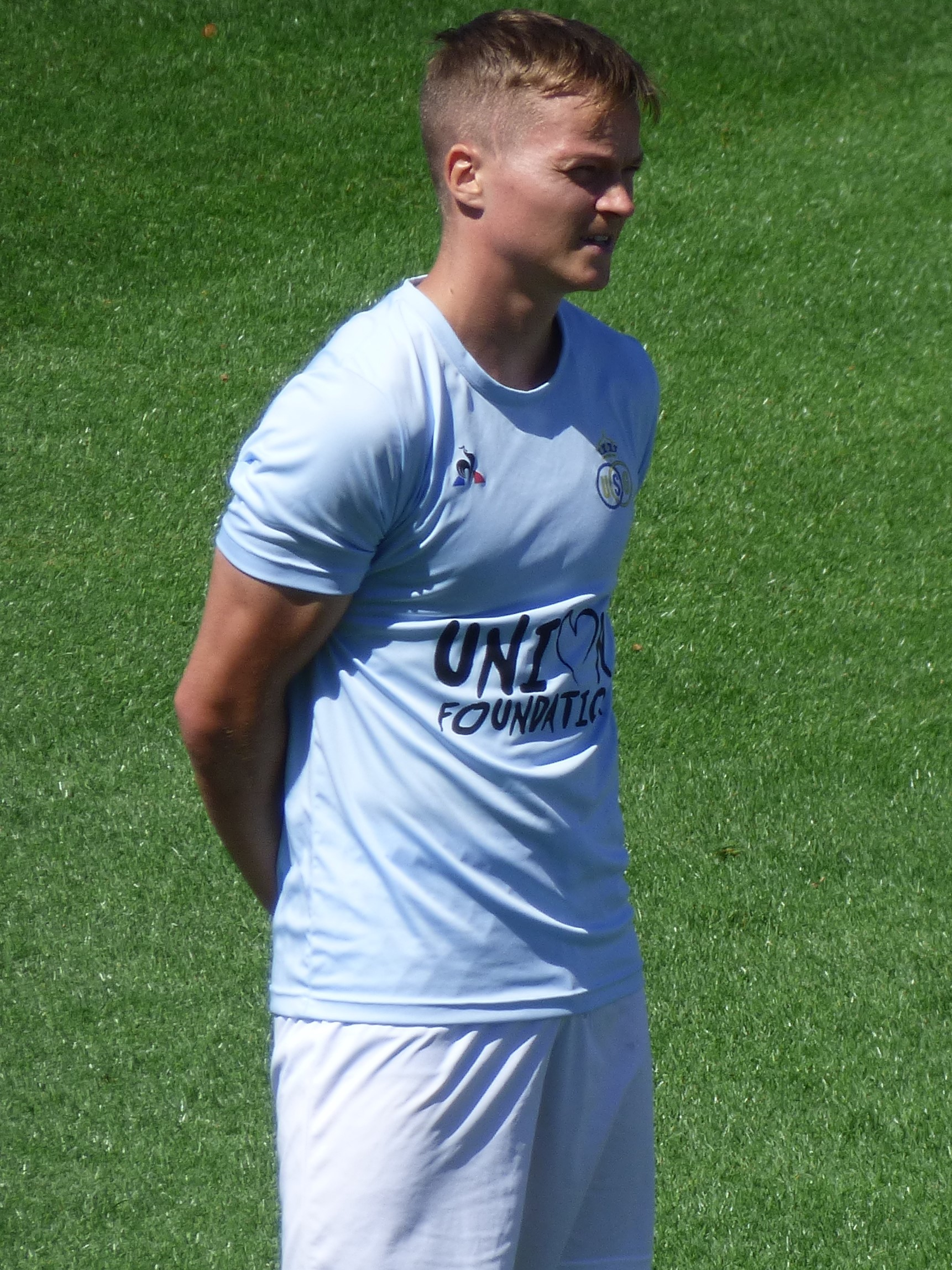
- Union Saint-Gilloise, 2020

Personal information
- Date of birth: 8 October 1993 (age 33)
- Place of birth: Reykjavík, Iceland
- Height: 1.78 m (5 ft 10 in)
- Position: Winger

Team information
- Current team: KR Reykjavík
- Number: 11

Senior career*
Years	Team	Apps	(Gls)
2010–2015	Fjölnir	94	(20)
2016–2018	Tromsø	45	(6)
2018–2019	Start	47	(14)
2020–2021	Union SG	23	(7)
2021–2024	Horsens	77	(15)
2024–	KR Reykjavík	70	(42)

International career
2011	Iceland futsal	1	(0)
2014	Iceland U21	1	(0)
2016–2023	Iceland	8	(2)
- * Club domestic league appearances and goals as of 1 November 2026

Aron Sigurðarson (born 8 October 1993) is an Icelandic professional footballer who plays as a left winger for KR Reykjavík and the Iceland national team. He previously played for Horsens, Union SG, Start, Tromsø and Fjölnir.

== Club career ==
On 12 February 2016, Aron signed a three-year contract with Norwegian Tippeligaen side Tromsø IL. In February 2018, he joined Norwegian Tippeligaen side Start. On 16 December 2019 Sigurdarson signed a 2,5 year contract with Belgium side Union SG.

On 9 August 2021, Sigurðarson joined Danish 1st Division club AC Horsens on a deal until June 2024. In January 2024, Sigurðarson returned to his homeland, signing with KR Reykjavík.

== International career ==
Aron made his debut for Iceland on 31 January 2016, in a friendly match against the United States in California, during which he also scored his first goal for his country.

== Career statistics ==
=== Club ===
As of match played 1 December 2023

Appearances and goals by club, season and competition
Club	Season	League			National Cup		League Cup		Continental		Other		Total	
Club	Season	Division	Apps	Goals	Apps	Goals	Apps	Goals	Apps	Goals	Apps	Goals	Apps	Goals
Fjölnir	2010	1. deild	3	0	2	0	6	0	—		—		11	0
Fjölnir	2011	1. deild	15	1	1	0	6	1	—		—		22	2
Fjölnir	2012	1. deild	15	0	0	0	6	0	—		—		21	0
Fjölnir	2013	1. deild	22	10	0	0	5	1	—		—		27	11
Fjölnir	2014	Úrvalsdeild	18	3	1	0	1	0	—		—		20	3
Fjölnir	2015	Úrvalsdeild	22	6	3	2	7	1	—		—		32	9
Fjölnir	Total		95	20	7	2	31	3	—		—		133	25
Tromsø	2016	Tippeligaen	24	3	3	0	—		—		—		27	3
Tromsø	2017	Eliteserien	21	3	1	1	—		—		—		22	4
Tromsø	Total		45	6	4	1	0	0	—		—		49	7
Start	2018	Eliteserien	17	1	4	3	—		—		—		21	4
Start	2019	OBOS-ligaen	29	13	1	0	—		—		—		30	13
Start	Total		46	14	5	3	0	0	—		—		51	17
Union SG	2019–20	Proximus League	8	3	0	0	—		—		—		8	3
Union SG	2020–21	Proximus League	15	4	3	1	—		—		—		18	5
Union SG	Total		23	7	3	1	0	0	—		—		26	8
Horsens	2021–22	1. Division	28	4	3	4	—		—		—		31	8
Horsens	2022–23	Superliga	31	7	2	0	—		—		—		33	7
Horsens	2023–24	1. Division	18	4	1	0	—		—		—		31	8
Horsens	Total		77	15	6	4	—		—		—		83	19
Career total			286	62	25	11	31	3	—		—		342	76

=== International ===
Iceland national team
Year	Apps	Goals
2016	1	1
2017	4	1
2018	1	0
2019	0	0
2020	0	0
2021	0	0
2022	0	0
2023	2	0
Total	8	2

Statistics accurate as of match played 1 April 2017

=== International goals ===
#	Date	Venue	Opponent	Score	Result	Competition	Ref
1.	31 January 2016	StubHub Center, Carson, California, United States	United States	2–1	2–3	Friendly match	
2.	10 January 2017	Guangxi Sports Center, Nanning, China	China	2–0	2–0	2017 China Cup	
