= Ævar Ingi Jóhannesson =

Icelandic footballer (born 1995)

Personal information
- Date of birth: 31 January 1995 (age 31)
- Place of birth: Akureyri, Iceland
- Positions: Midfielder; forward

Youth career
- –2014: KA

Senior career*
Years	Team	Apps	(Gls)
2011–2015	KA	75	(22)
2016–2020	Stjarnan	49	(7)

International career
2011–2012	Iceland U17	11	(1)
2012–2014	Iceland U19	12	(1)
2015–2016	Iceland U21	8	(0)
2016	Iceland	1	(0)
- * Club domestic league appearances and goals

Ævar Ingi Jóhannesson (born 31 January 1995) is a retired Icelandic footballer who last played for Stjarnan.

== Career statistics ==
Season	Club	Division	League		Cup		Other		Total	
Season	Club	Division	Apps	Goals	Apps	Goals	Apps	Goals	Apps	Goals
2011	KA	1.deild	2	0	0	0	0	0	2	0
2012	KA	1.deild	17	3	2	0	0	0	19	3
2013	KA	1.deild	17	4	1	0	0	0	18	4
2014	KA	1.deild	20	6	1	3	0	0	21	9
2015	KA	1.deild	19	9	4	3	0	0	23	12
Total			75	22	8	6	0	0	83	28
2016	Stjarnan	Úrvalsdeild	21	3	2	0	5 (Note: Appearances in Icelandic League Cup)	0	28	3
2017	Stjarnan	Úrvalsdeild	7	1	1	0	4	0	12	1
2018	Stjarnan	Úrvalsdeild	14	1	4	0	2	0	20	1
2019	Stjarnan	Úrvalsdeild	6	2	0	0	6 (Note: 3 appearances in Icelandic League Cup, 2 appearances in UEFA Europa League qualifying phase and 1 appearance in Icelandic Super Cup)	0	12	2
2020	Stjarnan	Úrvalsdeild	1	0	0	0	3	0	4	0
Total			49	7	7	0	20	0	76	7
Career total			124	29	15	6	20	0	159	35
