= 2015 2. deild karla =

2. deild karla
- Season: 2015
- Champions: Huginn
- Promoted: Huginn; Leiknir F.
- Relegated: Tindastóll; Dalvík/Reynir
- Matches played: 132
- Goals scored: 425 (3.22 per match)
- Top goalscorer: Alexander Már Þorláksson (KF) (18 goals)
- Biggest home win: Leiknir F. 6–0 Njarðvík (6 June 2015)
- Biggest away win: Afturelding 0–7 Tindastóll (11 July 2015)
- Highest scoring: Sindri 4–3 KV (9 May 2015); Ægir 3–4 Dalvík/Reynir (27 June 2015); Ægir 4–3 Sindri (8 August 2015); Dalvík/Reynir 1–6 KV (14 August 2015); KF 3–4 Höttur (30 August 2015); Afturelding 2–5 Sindri (6 September 2015); Leiknir F. 6–1 Ægir (12 September 2015)

The 2015 2. deild karla (English: Men's Second Division) was the 50th season of third-tier football in Iceland. Twelve teams contest the league. Play began on 9 May and concluded on 19 September.

== Teams ==
The league is contested by twelve clubs, eight of which played in the division during the 2014 season. There are four new clubs from the previous campaign:

- KV and Tindastóll were relegated from the 2014 1. deild karla, replacing Fjarðabyggð and Grótta who were promoted to the 2015 1. deild karla
- Höttur and Leiknir F. were promoted from the 2014 3. deild karla, in place of Völsungur and Reynir S. who were relegated to the 2015 3. deild karla

=== Club information ===
Location of teams in the 2015 2. deild karla

Team	Location	Stadium	2014 season
Afturelding	Mosfellsbær	Varmárvöllur	10th
Dalvík/Reynir	Dalvík	Dalvíkurvöllur	6th
Huginn	Seyðisfjörður	Seyðisfjarðarvöllur	4th
Höttur	Egilsstaðir	Vilhjálmsvöllur	1st in 3. deild
ÍR	Reykjavík	Hertzvöllurinn	3rd
KF	Fjallabyggð	Ólafsfjarðarvöllur	7th
KV	Reykjavík	KR-völlur	11th in 1. deild
Leiknir F.	Fáskrúðsfjörður	Búðagrund	2nd in 3. deild
Njarðvík	Njarðvík	Njarðtaksvöllurinn	8th
Sindri	Höfn	Sindravellir	5th
Tindastóll	Sauðárkrókur	Sauðárkróksvöllur	12th in 1. deild
Ægir	Þorlákshöfn	Þorlákshafnarvöllur	9th

== League table ==
Pos	Team	Pld	W	D	L	GF	GA	GD	Pts	Promotion or relegation
1	Huginn (C, P)	22	15	4	3	41	18	+23	49	Promotion to the 2016 1. deild karla
2	Leiknir F. (P)	22	14	6	2	51	22	+29	48	Promotion to the 2016 1. deild karla
3	ÍR	22	14	3	5	42	21	+21	45	
4	KV	22	10	4	8	44	36	+8	34	
5	Höttur	22	11	1	10	32	26	+6	34	
6	Afturelding	22	9	5	8	33	30	+3	32	
7	KF	22	8	4	10	39	27	+12	28	
8	Sindri	22	6	6	10	36	44	−8	24	
9	Ægir	22	7	3	12	34	44	−10	24	
10	Njarðvík	22	6	5	11	25	42	−17	23	
11	Tindastóll (R)	22	6	4	12	25	41	−16	22	Relegation to the 2016 3. deild karla
12	Dalvík/Reynir (R)	22	2	3	17	23	74	−51	9	Relegation to the 2016 3. deild karla

Updated to match(es) played on 19 September 2015. Source:
Rules for classification: 1) points; 2) goal difference; 3) number of goals scored.
(C) Champions; (P) Promoted; (R) Relegated

== Results ==
Each team plays every opponent once home and away for a total of 22 matches per club, and 132 matches altogether.

Home \ Away	AFT	DVR	HUG	HÖT	ÍR	KF	KV	LEF	NJA	SIH	TIN	ÆGR
Afturelding		1–0	2–1	1–4	0–0	2–1	1–2	1–2	1–1	2–5	1–2	2–0
Dalvík/Reynir	0–4		1–4	1–3	2–4	0–7	1–6	2–3	3–2	1–1	0–5	0–3
Huginn	2–0	3–1		1–0	2–1	1–0	1–0	2–2	0–1	1–1	5–0	4–2
Höttur	0–0	5–0	0–2		2–0	0–2	3–0	3–1	0–1	1–0	1–3	0–2
Íþróttafélag Reykjavíkur	1–4	4–2	2–1	4–0		1–0	2–2	2–1	1–0	1–0	4–0	3–0
Knattspyrnufélag Fjallabyggðar	1–1	5–1	0–1	3–4	2–1		0–1	1–2	4–0	1–2	2–2	2–1
Knattspyrnufélag Vesturbæjar	2–2	3–1	2–3	1–0	2–0	1–2		1–3	1–0	3–2	4–0	1–3
Leiknir F.	2–1	4–0	0–0	1–0	0–0	2–1	2–2		6–0	4–1	3–0	6–1
Njarðvík	1–0	2–2	0–1	0–2	0–1	0–2	3–3	1–1		3–2	3–1	0–3
Sindri	2–4	1–1	1–1	1–0	1–4	2–1	4–3	1–3	3–3		1–2	1–0
Tindastóll	1–2	1–0	0–2	1–2	0–2	1–1	2–1	1–2	1–2	1–1		0–1
Ægir	0–1	3–4	2–3	1–2	0–4	1–1	1–3	1–1	4–2	4–3	1–1	

Updated to match(es) played on 19 September 2015. Source:
Legend: Blue = home team win; Yellow = draw; Red = away team win.
