= 2014 Úrvalsdeild =

Úrvalsdeild karla
- Season: 2014
- Dates: 4 May – 4 October 2014
- Champions: Stjarnan (1st title)
- Relegated: Fram; Þór
- Champions League: Stjarnan
- Europa League: FH; KR; Víkingur R.
- Matches played: 132
- Goals scored: 398 (3.02 per match)
- Top goalscorer: Gary Martin (13)

The 2014 Úrvalsdeild karla, also known as Pepsi-deild karla for sponsorship reasons, was the 103rd season of top-flight Icelandic football. Twelve teams contested the league; the defending champions were KR, who won their twenty-sixth league title in 2013.

On 4 October Stjarnan won their first Úrvalsdeild karla title. Stjarnan went through the season unbeaten in the league and equalled the point record of 52 points.

== Teams ==
Location of teams in the 2014 Úrvalsdeild

The 2014 Úrvalsdeild will be contested by twelve clubs, ten of which played in the division the previous year. The changes from the 2013 campaign are:

- Víkingur Ó. and ÍA were relegated from the 2013 Úrvalsdeild to the 2014 1. deild karla.
- Fjölnir and Víkingur R. were promoted from the 2013 1. deild karla to the 2014 Úrvalsdeild.

=== Club information ===
Team	Location	Stadium	2013 season
Breiðablik	Kópavogur	Kópavogsvöllur	4th
FH	Hafnarfjörður	Kaplakrikavöllur	2nd
Fjölnir	Reykjavík	Fjölnisvöllur	1st, 1. deild
Fram	Reykjavík	Laugardalsvöllur	10th
Fylkir	Reykjavík	Fylkisvöllur	7th
ÍBV	Vestmannaeyjar	Hásteinsvöllur	6th
Keflavík	Keflavík	Keflavíkurvöllur	8th
KR	Reykjavík	KR-völlur	1st
Stjarnan	Garðabær	Stjörnuvöllur	3rd
Þór	Akureyri	Þórsvöllur	9th
Valur	Reykjavík	Hlíðarendi	5h
Víkingur	Reykjavík	Víkin	2nd, 1. deild

== League table ==
Pos	Team	Pld	W	D	L	GF	GA	GD	Pts	Qualification or relegation
1	Stjarnan (C)	22	15	7	0	42	21	+21	52	Qualification for the Champions League second qualifying round
2	FH	22	15	6	1	46	17	+29	51	Qualification for the Europa League first qualifying round (Note: The 2014 Icelandic Cup winner, KR, qualifies for 2015–16 UEFA Europa League first qualifying round.)
3	KR	22	13	4	5	40	24	+16	43	Qualification for the Europa League first qualifying round
4	Víkingur Reykjavík	22	9	3	10	25	29	−4	30	Qualification for the Europa League first qualifying round
5	Valur	22	8	4	10	31	36	−5	28	
6	Fylkir	22	8	4	10	34	40	−6	28	
7	Breiðablik	22	5	12	5	36	33	+3	27	
8	Keflavík	22	6	7	9	29	32	−3	25	
9	Fjölnir	22	5	8	9	33	36	−3	23	
10	ÍBV	22	5	7	10	28	38	−10	22	
11	Fram (R)	22	6	3	13	30	48	−18	21	Relegation to 1. deild karla
12	Þór A. (R)	22	3	3	16	24	44	−20	12	Relegation to 1. deild karla

Source: KSÍ
Rules for classification: 1) points; 2) goal difference; 3) number of goals scored.
(C) Champions; (R) Relegated

=== Positions by round ===
Team ╲ Round	1	2	3	4	5	6	7	8	9	10	11	12	13	14	15	16	17	18	19	20	21	22
Stjarnan	4	3	4	2	2	2	2	2	2	2	2	2	2	2	1	1	2	2	2	2	2	1
FH	5	4	3	1	1	1	1	1	1	1	1	1	1	1	2	2	1	1	1	1	1	2
KR	9	5	8	6	6	6	6	4	4	3	3	3	4	4	3	3	3	3	3	3	3	3
Víkingur Reykjavík	12	7	7	9	7	7	7	5	5	5	4	4	3	3	4	4	4	4	4	4	4	4
Valur	3	6	5	5	5	4	4	6	6	6	6	6	5	5	5	5	6	5	5	5	5	5
Fylkir	10	12	9	7	8	8	8	9	9	10	9	10	10	9	9	8	5	6	6	6	6	6
Breiðablik	5	8	11	10	11	11	10	10	10	8	7	8	8	8	8	6	8	7	7	7	7	7
Keflavík	2	2	1	3	3	3	3	3	3	4	5	5	6	6	6	7	9	9	10	10	8	8
Fjölnir	1	1	2	4	4	5	5	7	7	7	8	9	7	7	7	10	10	11	9	9	10	9
ÍBV	5	8	10	11	12	12	12	12	12	11	10	7	9	10	11	9	7	8	8	8	9	10
Fram	5	8	5	8	9	9	9	8	8	9	11	12	12	11	10	11	11	10	11	11	11	11
Þór A.	11	11	12	12	10	10	11	11	11	12	11	11	12	12	12	12	12	12	12	12	12	12

Leader
2015–16 UEFA Europa League first qualifying round
Relegation to 1. deild karla

Source: KSÍ

== Results ==
Each team plays every opponent once home and away for a total of 22 matches per club, and 132 matches all together.

Home \ Away	BRE	FH	FJÖ	FRA	FYL	ÍBV	KEF	KR	STJ	ÞÓR	VAL	VÍK
Breiðablik		2–4	2–2	3–0	2–2	1–1	4–4	1–2	1–1	3–2	3–0	4–1
FH	1–1		4–0	4–2	3–0	1–0	2–0	1–1	1–2	1–1	2–1	1–0
Fjölnir	1–1	0–1		1–4	3–3	3–0	1–1	1–1	0–0	4–1	1–1	3–0
Fram	1–1	0–4	1–3		4–3	1–1	1–1	1–2	1–2	1–0	1–0	0–3
Fylkir	1–1	0–2	2–1	2–0		3–1	2–4	0–4	1–3	4–1	2–0	1–1
ÍBV	1–1	1–1	4–2	2–0	1–3		0–2	2–3	1–2	2–0	2–2	1–2
Keflavík	2–0	1–1	1–1	2–4	0–1	1–2		0–1	2–2	3–1	1–2	2–0
KR	1–1	0–1	1–0	3–2	1–0	3–3	2–0		2–3	4–1	1–2	2–0
Stjarnan	2–2	2–2	2–1	4–0	1–0	2–0	2–0	2–1		2–1	1–1	0–0
Þór A.	2–0	0–2	1–2	0–2	5–2	1–1	0–0	2–0	3–4		0–1	0–1
Valur	1–2	1–4	4–3	5–3	1–0	3–0	0–1	1–4	1–2	2–0		1–2
Víkingur Reykjavík	1–0	2–3	1–0	2–1	1–2	1–2	3–1	0–1	0–1	3–2	1–1	

Source: KSÍ
Legend: Blue = home team win; Yellow = draw; Red = away team win.

== Top goalscorers ==
As of 4 October 2014.

Rank	Player	Club	Goals
1	(England) Gary Martin	KR	13
2	(Trinidad and Tobago) Jonathan Glenn	ÍBV	12
3	(Iceland) Ólafur Karl Finsen	Stjarnan	11
4	(Iceland) Árni Vilhjálmsson	Breiðablik	10
4	(Iceland) Hörður Sveinsson	Keflavík	10
4	(Iceland) Atli Guðnason	FH	10
7	(Iceland) Atli Viðar Björnsson	FH	8
7	(Iceland) (Senegal) Pape Mamadou Faye	Víkingur R.	8
9	(Iceland) Guðjón Pétur Lýðsson	Breiðablik	7
9	(Iceland) Jóhann Helgi Hannesson	Þór Akureyri	7
