= Rúnar Kristinsson =

Icelandic footballer (born 1969)

Personal information
- Date of birth: 5 September 1969 (age 57)
- Place of birth: Reykjavík, Iceland
- Height: 1.78 m (5 ft 10 in)
- Position: Midfielder

Youth career
- 1979–1986: KR Reykjavík

Senior career*
| Years | Team | Apps | (Gls) |
| 1986–1994 | KR Reykjavík | 126 | (21) |
| 1995–1997 | Örgryte IS | 59 | (13) |
| 1997–2000 | Lillestrøm | 71 | (14) |
| 2000–2007 | Lokeren | 189 | (37) |
| 2007 | KR Reykjavík | 14 | (0) |
| Total | | 459 | (85) |

International career
| 1984–1985 | Iceland U17 | 18 | (9) |
| 1987 | Iceland U19 | 11 | (1) |
| 1987–1991 | Iceland U21 | 10 | (3) |
| 1987–2004 | Iceland | 104 | (3) |

Managerial career
- 2010–2014: KR Reykjavík
- 2014–2016: Lillestrøm
- 2016–2017: Lokeren
- 2017–2023: KR Reykjavík
- 2023–: Fram Reykjavík
- * Club domestic league appearances and goals

Rúnar Kristinsson (born 5 September 1969) is an Icelandic former professional footballer who played for Lokeren, Lillestrøm SK, Örgryte IS and KR Reykjavík. He is the current manager of Fram. His son, Rúnar Alex Rúnarsson, is a goalkeeper, playing for Danish side F.C. Copenhagen.

== Club career ==
Rúnar first tried out football at the small club Leiknir, before he started practicing at KR Reykjavík, Iceland's oldest and most successful club, where he spent his youth career. His performances at the country's highest level attracted foreign clubs, and he was eventually transferred to Örgryte IS in Sweden. Halfway in the 1997 season, he moved across the border to Lillestrøm SK of Norway. Rúnar was a success there, thus in 2000, he moved to K.S.C. Lokeren in Belgium where he was very successful.

In May 2007, he returned to his former club KR Reykjavík in Iceland to finish his career. He took over as head coach at KR halfway through the 2010 season and managed the team for four whole seasons after that, resulting in two league titles (2011 and 2013) and three cup titles (2011, 2012 and 2014). Rúnar left KR November 2014, to manage his former club Lillestrøm SK.

== International career ==
Rúnar has been capped 104 times for Iceland, scoring three goals in the process, which was a long-standing record until Birkir Bjarnason broke it in 2021. He was captain of the team in 11 matches, but retired from international duties in 2004.

== Honours ==
=== Player ===
KR Reykjavík

- Icelandic Cup: 1994

=== Manager ===
KR Reykjavík

- Úrvalsdeild: 2011, 2013, 2019
- Icelandic Cup: 2011, 2012, 2014
- League Cup: 2012, 2019
- Icelandic Super Cup: 2012, 2014, 2020

== See also ==
- List of footballers with 100 or more caps
