= Ben Everson =

English footballer (born 1987)

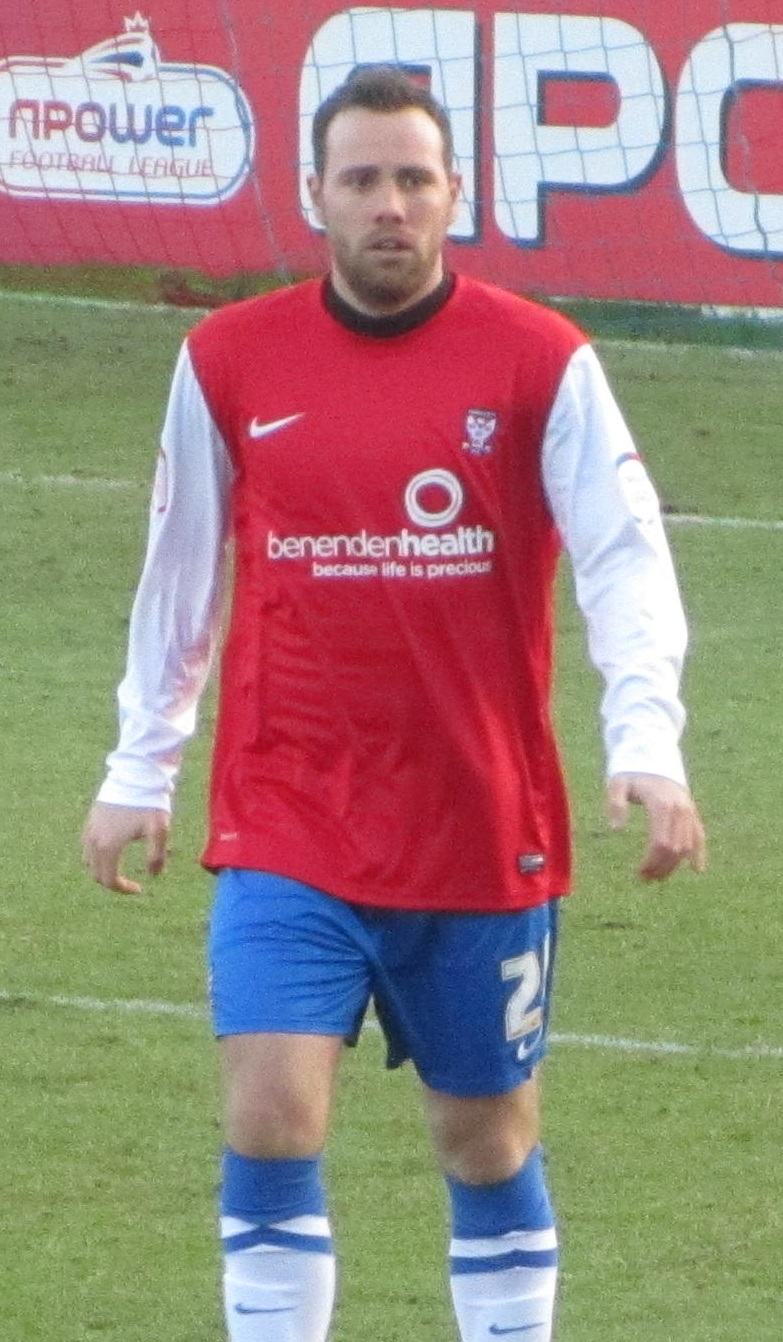
- Everson playing for York City in 2013

Personal information
- Full name: Benjamin James Everson
- Date of birth: 11 February 1987 (age 39)
- Place of birth: Middlesbrough, England
- Height: 5 ft 11 in (1.80 m)
- Position: Striker

Team information
- Current team: Dandenong City

College career
Years	Team	Apps	(Gls)
2007–2010	West Texas A&M Buffaloes		

Senior career*
Years	Team	Apps	(Gls)
?–2005	Norton & Stockton Ancients		
2005–2006	Shildon		
2006–2007	Guisborough Town		
2008	El Paso Patriots	8	(1)
2009	Bradenton Academics	6	(2)
2009–2011	West Texas United Sockers	23	(10)
2012	Tindastóll	10	(7)
2012	Breiðablik	9	(1)
2013	York City	2	(0)
2013	→ Gateshead (loan)	11	(2)
2013–2014	BÍ/Bolungarvík	20	(10)
2014–2015	AFC United	10	(0)
2015	KA Akureyri	21	(3)
2016	Hawke's Bay United	3	(1)
2017	Nakhon Pathom United		
2018–	Dandenong City	28	(15)
- * Club domestic league appearances and goals as of 18 December 2016

Benjamin James Everson (born 11 February 1987) is an English footballer who plays for Dandenong City as a striker. He previously played for Norton & Stockton Ancients, Shildon, Guisborough Town, El Paso Patriots, Bradenton Academics, West Texas United Sockers, Tindastóll, Breiðablik, York City, Gateshead, AFC United and KA Akureyri.

== Career ==
=== Early career ===
Born in Middlesbrough, North Yorkshire, Everson attended Newlands School FCJ and Middlesbrough College, graduating in 2005 after helping the college team win two National Championships in three appearances at the National Finals. He then became a student at Teesside University, based in Middlesbrough. Everson played for a number of local non-League sides, first playing for Norton & Stockton Ancients before joining Shildon in February 2005. During the summer he agreed to stay at the club for the 2005–06 season, before playing for Guisborough Town the following season. Everson also played futsal for Middlesbrough Futsal Club in 2007, helping them win the York Futsal Open the day after the club was founded. He played for Middlesbrough in the FA Futsal Cup finals, scoring 10 goals in five appearances, and competed in the Futsal Premier League as the team finished in second place.

=== United States ===
Everson earned a three-year football scholarship with West Texas A&M University in Canyon, Texas in 2007, having undergone trials with several universities in the United States. He scored on his collegiate debut with West Texas' first goal of the season, in a 2–1 victory over the University of Texas of the Permian Basin. He finished the 2007 season with 14 goals, equalling the sixth-highest number of goals scored in a season for West Texas. His 31 points was the highest of any player in the team that season, and is the eighth highest recorded by a West Texas player in a season. As a result of his contributions, he was named a member of the NSCAA All-Midwest Region first team, in addition to being named the SSC Freshman of the Year.

He was named the SSC Preseason Offensive Player of the Year ahead of the 2008 season, which he began with two successive goals in a 6–0 win over Northeastern State University. Later in the season he scored a hat-trick in West Texas' 5–0 win over the University of Texas of the Permian Basin. After scoring 13 goals and recording 28 points in the 2008 season, Everson was named the SSC Offensive Player of the Year and was included in the NSCAA NCAA Division II Men's all-South Central Region Team. Everson also played for USL Premier Development League side the El Paso Patriots during the 2008 season, scoring one goal in eight appearances.

His 15 goals and one assist in the 2009 season helped West Texas to their highest national ranking in the team's 19-year history. For the second time in three seasons, he recorded more points than any other player in the team, with 31. Everson earned the LSC Offensive Player of the Week award after scoring twice in a 7–1 win over the University of Texas of the Permian Basin. Following the season's close he was named the LSC Offensive Player of the Year for the second consecutive season, as well as being selected for the all-LSC first team. In addition, he was named the South Central Region Player of the Year and the all-American second team, before being included in the NSCAA South Central Region team. He left West Texas in top place in the LSC Men's Soccer leaderboards in goals (42) and shots (214).

Everson continued his football career in the United States with the Bradenton Academics of the USL Premier Development League, joining at the start of the 2009 season. Having scored twice in six games for the Academics, he signed for league rivals West Texas United Sockers late into the team's inaugural 2009 season and scored five goals in six league appearances. Everson also scored in the Sockers' 2–1 Divisional Semifinal win over Austin Aztex U23 on 22 July 2009, before playing in their 1–0 defeat to the Laredo Heat in the Divisional Final on 25 July. He finished the season with eight appearances and six goals for the Sockers.

Everson returned to Middlesbrough Futsal Club for the 2010 season, having briefly returned in early 2009 to play in a friendly match. After making two appearances for Middlesbrough, in which he scored six goals, he resumed his studies and football career at West Texas A&M University. He was named the LSC Preseason Offensive Player of the Year, having led the LSC in shots (77), points (31) and goals (19) in the 2010 season. He graduated in 2010, having spent a total of four years at West Texas, before attending graduate school at the University of Texas of the Permian Basin. He returned to play for the Sockers for the 2010 season, and having finished the season with two goals in six outings was invited to take part in a training camp with Major League Soccer side the San Jose Earthquakes in January 2011. Everson stayed with the Sockers and played for them during the 2011 season, making 11 appearances and scoring three goals.

=== Iceland ===
He signed with Icelandic 1. deild karla side Tindastóll in April 2012, making his debut after starting a 2–0 defeat away at Haukar on 12 May 2012. His first goal came with Tindastóll's second goal in a 4–2 home defeat to ÍR on 2 June 2012. Having scored seven goals in 11 appearances for Tindastóll, Everson signed for Breiðablik of the Úrvalsdeild in July 2012. He made his debut as a 64th minute substitute for Haukur Baldvinsson in a 1–0 victory at home to ÍBV on 29 July 2012. Everson scored on his second appearance with the winning goal in the first minute of stoppage time, securing his team a 4–3 away win at Valur on 8 August 2012. He finished the 2012 season with one goal in nine appearances for Breiðablik, as they qualified for the 2013–14 UEFA Europa League First qualifying round after finishing second in the league.

=== York City ===
Everson returned to England after signing for League Two side York City on a contract until the end of the 2012–13 season on 15 January 2013. He made his debut on 19 January 2013 as a 71st-minute substitute for Jamie Reed in a 0–0 home draw with Aldershot Town. Having struggled for opportunities in the team, Everson joined Conference Premier side Gateshead on a one-month loan on 21 February 2013. He made his Gateshead debut the following day as a 66th-minute substitute for James Brown in a 4–0 win at Macclesfield Town. Everson scored on his next appearance, in a 2–1 home defeat to Braintree Town on 2 March 2013. The loan was later extended until the end of the season, which he completed with two goals in 11 appearances. Having made two appearances for York he was released by the club on 30 April 2013.

=== Return to Iceland ===
Everson agreed a return to Iceland on 3 May 2013, signing for 1. deild karla club BÍ/Bolungarvík ahead of the 2013 season. He made his debut in a 1–0 away win at Íþróttafélagið Völsungur on 9 May 2013, before scoring his first goal in the following match, a 2–1 home win over Þróttur on 18 May.

=== Dandenong City ===
In February 2018, Everson joined National Premier Leagues Victoria 2 side Dandenong City, where he scored 15 times in 28 games.

== Style of play ==
Everson plays as a centre forward, and York manager Gary Mills described his style of play saying: "He likes to score goals and has done that wherever he's been. He works very hard and gets in good areas".

== Career statistics ==
As of match played 21 September 2013

Appearances and goals by club, season and competition
Club	Season	League			National cup		League cup		Other		Total	
Club	Season	Division	Apps	Goals	Apps	Goals	Apps	Goals	Apps	Goals	Apps	Goals
El Paso Patriots	2008	USL PDL	8	1	—		—		—		8	1
Bradenton Academics	2009	USL PDL	6	2	—		—		—		6	2
West Texas United Sockers	2009	USL PDL	6	5	—		—		2 (Note: Appearances in USL Premier Development League playoffs)	1	8	6
West Texas United Sockers	2010	USL PDL	6	2	—		—		—		6	2
West Texas United Sockers	2011	USL PDL	11	3	—		—		—		11	3
West Texas United Sockers	Total		23	10	—		—		2	1	25	11
Tindastóll	2012	1. deild karla	10	7	1	0	0	0	—		11	7
Breiðablik	2012	Úrvalsdeild	9	1	0	0	0	0	—		9	1
York City	2012–13	League Two	2	0	0	0	0	0	0	0	2	0
Gateshead (loan)	2012–13	Conference Premier	11	2	0	0	—		0	0	11	2
BÍ/Bolungarvík	2013	1. deild karla	20	10	2	2	0	0	—		22	12
Career total			89	33	3	2	0	0	2	1	94	36
