= 2013 2. deild karla =

2. deild karla
- Season: 2013
- Champions: HK
- Promoted: HK; KV
- Relegated: Hamar; Höttur
- Matches played: 132
- Goals scored: 422 (3.2 per match)
- Top goalscorer: 17 goals: Guðmundur Atli Steinþórsson (HK)
- Biggest home win: Afturelding 6–1 Hamar; Afturelding 5–0 Ægir
- Biggest away win: Ægir 0–4 KV; Dalvík/Reynir 2–6 HK; Dalvík/Reynir 2–6 Njarðvík
- Highest scoring: 8 goals: Dalvík/Reynir 2–6 HK; Dalvík/Reynir 2–6 Njarðvík; Hamar 3–5 ÍR; Njarðvík 4–4 Reynir S.
- Longest winning run: 4 matches: Afturelding (6 June – 29 June); Reynir S. (2 July – 19 July); ÍR (29 August – 21 September)
- Longest unbeaten run: 7 matches: KV (6 July – 13 August); Njarðvík (18 July – 22 August)
- Longest winless run: 16 matches: Höttur (11 May – 13 August)
- Longest losing run: 10 matches: Hamar (20 July – 14 September)

The 2013 2. deild karla (English: Men's Second Division) is the 48th season of third-tier football in Iceland. Twelve teams will contest the league, which as of 2013 is no longer the lowest national division in Iceland following the restructuring of the league pyramid. The fixtures for the 2013 campaign were released by the KSÍ on 10 November 2012; play began on 10 May and concluded on 21 September.

The league champions were HK, who finished ahead of second-placed KV on goal difference. Both clubs were therefore promoted to the 1. deild for the 2014 season. At the other end of the table, Hamar and Höttur were both relegated to the 2014 3. deild karla.

== Teams ==
The league will be contested by twelve clubs, eight of which played in the division during the 2012 season. There are four new clubs from the previous campaign:

- Höttur and ÍR were relegated from the 2012 1. deild karla, replacing KF and Völsungur who were promoted to the 2013 1. deild karla
- Ægir and Sindri were promoted from the 2012 3. deild karla, in place of Fjarðabyggð and KFR who were relegated to the 2013 3. deild karla

=== Club information ===
Location of teams in the 2013 2. deild karla

Team	Location	Stadium	2012 season
Afturelding	Mosfellsbær	Varmárvöllur	5th
Dalvík/Reynir	Dalvík	Dalvíkurvöllur	6th
Grótta	Seltjarnarnes	Gróttuvöllur	10th
Hamar	Hveragerði	Grýluvöllur	9th
HK	Kópavogur	Kópavogsvöllur	3rd
Höttur	Egilsstaðir	Vilhjálmsvöllur	1. deild, 11th
ÍR	Reykjavík	Hertzvöllurinn	1. deild, 12th
KV	Reykjavík	KR-völlur	4th
Njarðvík	Njarðvík	Njarðvíkurvöllur	8th
Reynir S.	Sandgerði	Sandgerðisvöllur	7th
Sindri	Höfn	Sindravellir	3. deild, 1st
Ægir	Þorlákshöfn	Þorlákshafnarvöllur	3. deild, 2nd

== League table ==
Pos	Team	Pld	W	D	L	GF	GA	GD	Pts	Promotion or relegation
1	HK (C, P)	22	12	4	6	50	30	+20	40	Promotion to the 2014 1. deild karla
2	KV (P)	22	11	7	4	45	30	+15	40	Promotion to the 2014 1. deild karla
3	Afturelding	22	11	6	5	49	32	+17	39	
4	ÍR	22	12	3	7	42	32	+10	39	
5	Grótta	22	11	5	6	30	21	+9	38	
6	Njarðvík	22	8	7	7	43	35	+8	31	
7	Dalvík/Reynir	22	8	6	8	32	37	−5	30	
8	Reynir S.	22	8	3	11	34	41	−7	27	
9	Sindri	22	7	5	10	31	38	−7	26	
10	Ægir	22	6	5	11	25	40	−15	23	
11	Höttur (R)	22	4	7	11	25	39	−14	19	Relegation to the 2014 3. deild karla
12	Hamar (R)	22	3	4	15	17	48	−31	13	Relegation to the 2014 3. deild karla

Rules for classification: 1) points; 2) goal difference; 3) number of goals scored.
(C) Champions; (P) Promoted; (R) Relegated

== Results ==
Each team plays every opponent once home and away for a total of 22 matches per club, and 132 matches altogether.

Home \ Away	AFT	DVR	GRÓ	HAM	HK	HÖT	ÍR	KV	NJA	REY	SIH	ÆGR
Afturelding		3–3	1–2	6–1	4–2	3–1	1–2	2–3	3–1	3–0	3–2	5–0
Dalvík/Reynir	1–3		0–0	1–1	2–6	1–3	2–3	2–1	2–6	0–3	4–0	1–0
Grótta	2–0	1–0		0–0	1–3	4–0	1–1	1–3	1–1	3–2	2–0	3–0
Hamar	0–1	1–0	0–1		1–1	0–1	3–5	2–1	1–4	0–1	2–4	0–1
HK	4–1	0–2	2–0	4–0		2–2	1–0	1–1	3–1	5–1	0–1	2–0
Höttur	1–1	1–1	1–2	0–1	2–0		1–1	1–4	0–0	3–2	2–3	1–2
ÍR	1–2	1–2	1–0	5–1	1–3	4–1		3–0	1–0	3–1	2–2	2–1
KV	1–1	0–0	1–1	3–0	4–2	2–1	5–2		2–2	1–0	2–0	1–1
Njarðvík	1–1	1–2	2–0	5–1	1–3	1–0	3–1	3–3		4–4	2–1	1–2
Reynir S.	1–1	1–3	1–2	2–1	1–4	2–2	1–0	3–0	1–0		1–2	2–1
Sindri	1–2	1–2	2–0	1–1	0–0	2–0	1–1	2–3	2–2	2–0		1–1
Ægir	2–2	1–1	0–3	1–0	4–2	1–1	0–1	0–4	1–2	1–4	5–1	

Updated to match(es) played on unknown. Source:
Legend: Blue = home team win; Yellow = draw; Red = away team win.
