= 2013 Úrvalsdeild =

Úrvalsdeild
- Season: 2013
- Dates: 5 May – 28 September 2013
- Champions: KR (26th title)
- Relegated: ÍA; Víkingur Ó.
- Champions League: KR
- Europa League: Fram (via Icelandic Cup); FH; Stjarnan
- Matches: 132
- Goals: 412 (3.12 per match)
- Top goalscorer: 13 goals: Atli Viðar Björnsson (FH); Viðar Örn Kjartansson (Fylkir); Gary John Martin (KR)
- Biggest home win: Valur 4–0 Keflavík; FH 4–0 Stjarnan
- Biggest away win: ÍA 0–5 Víkingur Ó. Víkingur Ó. 0–5 Valur
- Highest scoring: 10 goals: Valur 6–4 ÍA
- Longest winning run: 7 matches: KR (28 July – 16 September)
- Longest unbeaten run: 12 matches: Breiðablik (28 May – 25 August)
- Longest winless run: 11 matches: Fylkir (6 May – 15 July)
- Longest losing run: 6 matches: ÍA (26 May – 3 July)
- Highest attendance: 3,034; ÍBV 1–2 FH (3 August)
- Lowest attendance: 315; Víkingur Ó. 0–5 Valur (28 September)
- Average attendance: 1,057

The 2013 Úrvalsdeild karla (English: Men's Premier League), also known as the Pepsi-deild for sponsorship reasons, was the 102nd edition of top-flight Úrvalsdeild karla football in Iceland. Twelve teams contested the league

FH unsuccessfully defended its sixth league 2012 title. KR successfully pursued its 26th Úrvalsdeild title.

The fixtures for the 2013 campaign were released by the KSÍ on 10 November 2012, while the season is scheduled to run from 5 May until 28 September.

== Teams ==
The 2013 Úrvalsdeild was contested by twelve clubs, ten of which played in the division the previous season. The changes from the 2012 campaign were:

- Grindavík and Selfoss were relegated from the 2012 Úrvalsdeild to the 2013 1. deild karla.
- Þór A. and Víkingur Ó. were promoted from the 2012 1. deild karla to the 2013 Úrvalsdeild.

=== Club information ===
Team	Location	Stadium	Turf	2012 season
Breiðablik	Kópavogur	Kópavogsvöllur	Natural	2nd
FH	Hafnarfjörður	Kaplakrikavöllur	Natural	1st
Fram	Reykjavík	Laugardalsvöllur	Natural	10th
Fylkir	Reykjavík	Fylkisvöllur	Natural	7th
ÍA	Akranes	Akranesvöllur	Natural	6th
ÍBV	Vestmannaeyjar	Hásteinsvöllur	Natural	3rd
Keflavík	Keflavík	Keflavíkurvöllur	Natural	9th
KR	Reykjavík	KR-völlur	Natural	4th
Stjarnan	Garðabær	Stjörnuvöllur	Artificial	5th
Valur	Reykjavík	Hlíðarendi	Natural	8th
Víkingur Ó.	Ólafsvík	Ólafsvíkurvöllur	Natural	1. deild, 2nd
Þór A.	Akureyri	Þórsvöllur	Natural	1. deild, 1st

=== Iceland Map ===
Location of teams in the 2013 Úrvalsdeild

== League table ==
Pos	Team	Pld	W	D	L	GF	GA	GD	Pts	Qualification or relegation
1	KR (C)	22	17	1	4	50	27	+23	52	Qualification for the Champions League second qualifying round
2	FH	22	14	5	3	47	22	+25	47	Qualification for the Europa League first qualifying round
3	Stjarnan	22	13	4	5	34	25	+9	43	Qualification for the Europa League first qualifying round
4	Breiðablik	22	11	6	5	37	27	+10	39	
5	Valur	22	8	9	5	45	31	+14	33	
6	ÍBV	22	8	5	9	26	28	−2	29	
7	Fylkir	22	7	5	10	33	33	0	26	
8	Keflavík	22	7	3	12	33	47	−14	24	
9	Þór A.	22	6	6	10	31	44	−13	24	
10	Fram	22	6	4	12	26	37	−11	22	Qualification for the Europa League first qualifying round (Note: Fram Reykjavík qualified for the 2014–15 UEFA Europa League first qualifying round by winning the 2013 Icelandic Cup.)
11	Víkingur Ólafsvík (R)	22	3	8	11	21	35	−14	17	Relegation to 1. deild karla
12	ÍA (R)	22	3	2	17	29	56	−27	11	Relegation to 1. deild karla

Rules for classification: 1) points; 2) goal difference; 3) number of goals scored.
(C) Champions; (R) Relegated

== Results ==
Each team plays every opponent once home and away for a total of 22 matches per club, and 132 matches all together.

Home \ Away	BRE	FRA	FYL	FH	ÍA	ÍBV	KEF	KR	STJ	VAL	VÓL	ÞÓR
Breiðablik		1–2	1–4	0–1	4–1	3–1	3–2	3–0	2–1	1–0	2–0	4–1
Fram	1–1		1–1	0–2	1–0	0–1	2–3	2–1	0–1	0–4	3–4	4–1
Fylkir	0–1	3–0		0–1	1–1	0–1	3–0	2–3	0–1	1–2	2–1	1–4
FH	0–0	2–1	2–1		2–0	1–1	2–1	2–4	4–0	3–3	2–2	1–0
ÍA	2–2	2–0	1–3	2–6		2–1	2–3	3–1	1–3	1–3	0–5	1–2
ÍBV	4–1	1–0	3–1	1–2	1–0		1–1	0–2	1–0	0–2	1–1	1–2
Keflavík	1–2	1–2	2–2	0–4	5–4	4–2		0–2	0–2	2–0	2–0	1–3
KR	1–1	2–1	4–1	3–1	4–2	3–1	3–0		2–1	3–1	2–1	3–0
Stjarnan	3–2	3–2	1–2	2–1	1–0	1–0	1–0	3–1		1–1	3–2	3–1
Valur	1–1	1–1	1–3	1–1	6–4	1–1	4–0	1–2	1–1		0–0	2–2
Víkingur Ólafsvík	0–0	1–2	0–0	0–4	1–0	0–0	1–3	0–1	1–1	0–5		1–1
Þór A.	1–2	1–1	2–2	0–3	1–0	1–3	2–2	1–3	1–1	3–5	1–0	

Legend: Blue = home team win; Yellow = draw; Red = away team win.

== Top goalscorers ==
As of 28 September 2013.

Rank	Player	Club	Goals
1	(Iceland) Atli Viðar Björnsson	FH	13
1	(Iceland) Viðar Örn Kjartansson	Fylkir	13
1	(England) Gary John Martin	KR	13
4	(United States) Chukwudi Chijindu	Þór	10
4	(Iceland) Hólmbert Friðjónsson	Fram	10
6	(Iceland) Halldór Orri Björnsson	Stjarnan	9
6	(Iceland) Björn Daníel Sverrisson	FH	9
6	(Iceland) Árni Vilhjálmsson	Breiðablik	9
6	(Iceland) Hörður Sveinsson	Keflavík	9
