= 2013 1. deild karla =

1. deild karla
- Season: 2013
- Champions: Fjölnir
- Promoted: Fjölnir; Víkingur R.
- Relegated: KF; Völsungur
- Matches: 132
- Goals: 454 (3.44 per match)
- Top goalscorer: 14 goals: Aron Elís Þrándarson (Víkingur R.)
- Biggest home win: Víkingur R. 16–0 Völsungur
- Biggest away win: KF 0–7 Grindavík; Völsungur 0–7 Haukar
- Highest scoring: 16 goals: Víkingur R. 16–0 Völsungur
- Longest winning run: 6 matches: Grindavík (17 May – 22 June)
- Longest unbeaten run: 10 matches: Víkingur R. (24 May – 19 July)
- Longest winless run: 22 matches: Völsungur (whole season)
- Longest losing run: 16 matches: Völsungur (22 June – 21 September)

The 2013 1. deild karla (English: Men's First Division) was the 59th season of second-tier Icelandic football. Twelve teams were due to contest the league. The fixtures for the 2013 campaign were released by the KSÍ on 10 November 2012. Play began on 9 May and was scheduled to conclude on 21 September.

== Teams ==
The league was to be contested by twelve clubs, eight of which had played in the 2012 season. There were four new clubs from the previous campaign:

- Grindavík and Selfoss were relegated from the 2012 Úrvalsdeild, replacing Þór A. and Víkingur Ó. who were promoted to the 2013 Úrvalsdeild
- KF and Völsungur were promoted from the 2012 2. deild karla, in place of ÍR and Höttur who were relegated to the 2013 2. deild karla

=== Club information ===
Location of teams in the 2013 1. deild karla

Team	Location	Stadium	2012 season
BÍ/Bolungarvík	Ísafjörður/Bolungarvík	Torfnesvöllur	9th
Fjölnir	Reykjavík	Fjölnisvöllur	7th
Grindavík	Grindavík	Grindavíkurvöllur	Úrvalsdeild, 12th
Haukar	Hafnarfjörður	Schenkervöllurinn	5th
KA	Akureyri	Akureyrarvöllur	4th
KF	Fjallabyggð	Ólafsfjarðarvöllur	2. deild, 2nd
Leiknir R.	Reykjavík	Leiknisvöllur	10th
Selfoss	Selfoss	Selfossvöllur	Úrvalsdeild, 11th
Tindastóll	Sauðárkrókur	Sauðárkróksvöllur	8th
Víkingur R.	Reykjavík	Víkin	6th
Völsungur	Húsavík	Húsavíkurvöllur	2. deild, 1st
Þróttur R.	Reykjavík	Valbjarnarvöllur	3rd

== League table ==
Pos	Team	Pld	W	D	L	GF	GA	GD	Pts	Promotion or relegation
1	Fjölnir (C, P)	22	13	4	5	38	24	+14	43	Promotion to the 2014 Úrvalsdeild
2	Víkingur R. (P)	22	12	6	4	56	28	+28	42	Promotion to the 2014 Úrvalsdeild
3	Haukar	22	12	6	4	49	29	+20	42	
4	Grindavík	22	13	3	6	51	32	+19	42	
5	BÍ/Bolungarvík	22	13	1	8	47	39	+8	40	
6	KA	22	9	5	8	38	31	+7	32	
7	Leiknir R.	22	9	5	8	36	31	+5	32	
8	Selfoss	22	8	3	11	44	38	+6	27	
9	Tindastóll	22	6	7	9	29	40	−11	25	
10	Þróttur R.	22	7	2	13	26	36	−10	23	
11	KF (R)	22	5	6	11	25	41	−16	21	Relegation to the 2014 2. deild karla
12	Völsungur (R)	22	0	2	20	15	85	−70	2	Relegation to the 2014 2. deild karla

Rules for classification: 1) points; 2) goal difference; 3) number of goals scored.
(C) Champions; (P) Promoted; (R) Relegated

== Results ==
Each team plays every opponent once home and away for a total of 22 matches per club, and 132 matches altogether.

Home \ Away	BÍB	FJÖ	GRI	HAU	KAK	KF	LRE	SEL	TIN	VÍK	VÖL	ÞRÓ
BÍ/Bolungarvík		1–2	3–1	2–2	4–2	2–1	3–2	4–3	2–0	0–2	4–1	2–1
Fjölnir	2–4		0–0	4–1	0–1	2–1	1–0	3–0	2–2	2–5	2–1	1–3
Grindavík	6–1	0–4		1–1	2–1	2–0	3–2	1–3	4–1	1–2	4–2	2–1
Haukar	4–3	1–0	0–1		4–2	4–0	1–1	2–1	3–1	2–1	5–1	1–2
KA	1–0	1–1	2–2	1–2		1–1	0–1	4–3	5–1	0–1	2–0	3–1
KF	0–3	0–1	0–7	1–1	4–1		0–1	2–1	1–1	2–2	3–1	0–1
Leiknir R.	3–2	1–3	1–2	0–0	2–1	1–1		3–2	1–1	2–2	3–0	3–0
Selfoss	0–2	1–2	3–0	2–3	0–1	2–3	4–2		1–0	6–1	6–1	2–2
Tindastóll	0–2	0–1	0–2	2–1	2–2	3–1	4–3	1–1		0–3	1–1	3–0
Víkingur Reykjavík	3–0	0–2	4–2	2–2	0–0	1–1	1–0	1–2	1–1		16–0	3–1
Völsungur	0–1	1–3	1–5	0–7	0–6	1–2	0–3	0–0	2–3	1–3		1–3
Þróttur Reykjavík	3–2	0–0	0–3	1–2	0–1	2–1	0–1	0–1	1–2	1–2	3–0	

Updated to match(es) played on unknown. Source:
Legend: Blue = home team win; Yellow = draw; Red = away team win.

== Top goalscorers ==
As of 31 August 2013.

Rank	Player	Club	Goals	Matches	Ratio
1	Aron Elís Þrándarson	Víkingur R.	10	12	0.83
1	Stefán Þór Pálsson	Grindavík	10	19	0.53
3	Ben Everson	BÍ/Bolungarvík	9	16	0.56
3	Hilmar Árni Halldórsson	Leiknir R.	9	19	0.47
3	Aron Sigurðarson	Fjölnir	9	19	0.47
6	Javi Zurbano	Selfoss	8	19	0.42
