= 2014 2. deild karla =

49th season of third-tier football in Iceland

2. deild karla
- Season: 2014
- Champions: Fjarðabyggð
- Promoted: Fjarðabyggð; Grótta
- Relegated: Völsungur; Reynir S.
- Matches played: 132
- Goals scored: 439 (3.33 per match)
- Top goalscorer: 19 goals: Brynjar Jónasson (Fjarðabyggð)
- Biggest home win: ÍR 8–1 Völsungur
- Biggest away win: Grótta 0–4 Njarðvík
- Highest scoring: 9 goals: ÍR 8–1 Völsungur

The 2014 2. deild karla (English: Men's Second Division) is the 49th season of third-tier football in Iceland. Twelve teams will contest the league. Play began on 10 May and concluded on 20 September.

The league champions were newly promoted Fjarðabyggð, who finished 7 points ahead of second-placed Grótta. Both clubs were therefore promoted to the 1. deild for the 2015 season. At the other end of the table, Völsungur and Reynir S. were both relegated to the 2015 3. deild karla.

== Teams ==
The league was contested by twelve clubs, eight of which played in the division during the 2012 season. There were four new clubs from the previous campaign:

- KF and Völsungur were relegated from the 2013 1. deild karla, replacing HK and KV who were promoted to the 2014 1. deild karla
- Fjarðabyggð and Huginn were promoted from the 2013 3. deild karla, in place of Höttur and Hamar who were relegated to the 2014 3. deild karla

=== Club information ===
Location of teams in the 2014 2. deild karla

Team	Location	Stadium	2013 season
Afturelding	Mosfellsbær	Varmárvöllur	3rd
Dalvík/Reynir	Dalvík	Dalvíkurvöllur	7th
Fjarðabyggð	Fjarðabyggð	Eskjuvöllur/Norðfjarðarvöllur	1st in 3. deild
Grótta	Seltjarnarnes	Gróttuvöllur	5th
Huginn	Seyðisfjörður	Seyðisfjarðarvöllur	2nd in 3. deild
ÍR	Reykjavík	Hertzvöllurinn	4th
KF	Fjallabyggð	Ólafsfjarðarvöllur	11th in 1. deild
Njarðvík	Njarðvík	Njarðvíkurvöllur	6th
Reynir S.	Sandgerði	Sandgerðisvöllur	8th
Sindri	Höfn	Sindravellir	9th
Völsungur	Húsavík	Húsavíkurvöllur	12th in 1. deild
Ægir	Þorlákshöfn	Þorlákshafnarvöllur	10th

== League table ==
Pos	Team	Pld	W	D	L	GF	GA	GD	Pts	Promotion or relegation
1	Fjarðabyggð (C, P)	22	15	6	1	53	20	+33	51	Promotion to the 2015 1. deild karla
2	Grótta (P)	22	14	2	6	49	36	+13	44	Promotion to the 2015 1. deild karla
3	ÍR	22	11	7	4	41	24	+17	40	
4	Huginn	22	11	4	7	47	37	+10	37	
5	Sindri	22	9	3	10	34	37	−3	30	
6	Dalvík/Reynir	22	7	6	9	28	33	−5	27	
7	KF	22	8	3	11	29	39	−10	27	
8	Njarðvík	22	6	6	10	36	42	−6	24	
9	Ægir	22	7	3	12	22	35	−13	24	
10	Afturelding	22	6	4	12	35	36	−1	22	
11	Völsungur (R)	22	6	4	12	35	51	−16	22	Relegation to the 2015 3. deild karla
12	Reynir S. (R)	22	6	4	12	30	49	−19	22	Relegation to the 2015 3. deild karla

Rules for classification: 1) points; 2) goal difference; 3) number of goals scored.
(C) Champions; (P) Promoted; (R) Relegated

== Results ==
Each team plays every opponent once home and away for a total of 22 matches per club, and 132 matches altogether.

Home \ Away	AFT	DVR	KFF	GRÓ	HUG	ÍR	KF	NJA	REY	SIH	VÖL	ÆGR
Afturelding		0–0	3–2	1–2	1–2	1–2	4–1	3–1	2–3	4–0	3–1	0–0
Dalvík/Reynir	1–1		0–0	2–0	1–3	0–2	1–0	2–1	1–2	2–2	3–0	2–1
Fjarðabyggð	3–2	3–2		3–1	1–1	2–2	4–0	3–0	3–2	2–0	2–0	2–0
Grótta	4–1	1–1	2–3		4–3	2–2	5–1	0–4	6–2	4–3	1–0	1–0
Huginn	1–0	2–2	1–1	0–2		2–1	3–1	2–4	5–1	1–0	4–2	4–1
ÍR	2–1	1–0	0–0	0–1	4–3		1–0	2–1	3–1	1–2	8–1	2–1
KF	3–0	3–1	0–3	3–4	2–1	2–1		3–1	2–1	2–1	2–1	2–2
Njarðvík	1–0	2–0	0–3	4–2	2–2	1–1	1–1		1–3	2–4	2–2	2–3
Reynir S.	2–2	1–2	2–2	0–3	0–2	0–3	1–0	1–1		0–3	2–2	2–0
Sindri	2–1	3–0	1–4	0–3	3–1	2–2	0–0	2–1	2–0		1–3	1–2
Völsungur	3–2	3–2	1–4	3–0	2–3	0–0	2–1	3–3	3–4	1–0		1–2
Ægir	0–3	2–3	0–3	0–1	2–1	1–1	1–0	0–1	1–0	1–2	2–1	

Updated to match(es) played on unknown. Source:
Legend: Blue = home team win; Yellow = draw; Red = away team win.
