= 2012 1. deild karla =

1. deild karla
- Season: 2012
- Champions: Þór
- Promoted: Þór; Víkingur Ó.
- Relegated: ÍR; Höttur
- Matches: 132
- Goals: 387 (2.93 per match)
- Top goalscorer: Guðmundur Steinn Hafsteinsson (10)
- Biggest home win: Þróttur R. 6–0 Tindastóll
- Biggest away win: ÍR 0–5 Fjölnir
- Highest scoring: Tindastóll 6–2 Höttur; Víkingur R. 2–6 Fjölnir

The 2012 season of the 1. deild karla (English: Men's First Division) was the 58th season of second-tier football in Iceland and ran from 12 May 2012 until 22 September 2012. The league title was won by Þór Akureyri, who ended the campaign with a record of 16 wins, 2 draws and 4 defeats, giving them a total of 50 points. The Akureyri club, who had been relegated from the Úrvalsdeild in 2011, thereby achieved promotion back to the top level of Icelandic football at the first attempt. Also promoted to the Úrvalsdeild for the 2013 season were runners-up Víkingur Ólafsvík, who finished nine points clear of third-placed Þróttur Reykjavík.

At the other end of the table, ÍR finished bottom of the division after taking only 14 points from their 22 league matches and were thereby relegated to the 2. deild karla. Höttur were also relegated on the final day of the season after losing 0–1 away at Þór.

The top goalscorer for the 2012 season was Víkingur Ólafsvík midfielder Guðmundur Steinn Hafsteinsson, who netted 10 goals in 20 league appearances. Four other players were one behind on nine goals. In total, 387 goals were scored during the campaign at an average of 2.93 per match.

== Club information ==
Location of teams in the 2012 1. deild karla

The league was contested by 12 clubs, eight of which had played in the 2011 season. There were four new clubs from the previous campaign:

- Þór Akureyri and Víkingur Reykjavík were relegated from the Úrvalsdeild
- Tindastóll and Höttur were promoted from the 2. deild karla

== Locations and stadia ==
Team	Location	Stadium	Stadium capacity
BÍ/Bolungarvík	Ísafjörður/Bolungarvík	Torfnesvöllur	2,000
Fjölnir	Reykjavík	Fjölnisvöllur	2,000
Haukar	Hafnarfjörður	Ásvellir	3,000
Höttur	Egilsstaðir	Vilhjálmsvöllur	500
ÍR	Reykjavík	Hertzvöllurinn	1,500
KA	Akureyri	Akureyrarvöllur	2,000
Leiknir R.	Reykjavík	Leiknisvöllur	300
Tindastóll	Sauðárkrókur	Sauðárkróksvöllur	2,500
Víkingur Ó.	Ólafsvík	Ólafsvíkurvöllur	800
Víkingur R.	Reykjavík	Víkin	1,152
Þór A.	Akureyri	Þórsvöllur	984
Þróttur R.	Reykjavík	Valbjarnarvöllur	5,478

== Statistics ==
=== League table ===
Pos	Team	Pld	W	D	L	GF	GA	GD	Pts	Promotion or relegation
1	Þór A. (C, P)	22	16	2	4	40	20	+20	50	Promotion to the Úrvalsdeild
2	Víkingur Ólafsvík (P)	22	13	3	6	36	21	+15	42	Promotion to the Úrvalsdeild
3	Þróttur Reykjavík	22	9	6	7	34	26	+8	33	
4	KA	22	9	6	7	34	30	+4	33	
5	Haukar	22	9	6	7	23	25	−2	33	
6	Víkingur Reykjavík	22	8	7	7	34	31	+3	31	
7	Fjölnir	22	7	8	7	39	26	+13	29	
8	Tindastóll	22	8	3	11	34	42	−8	27	
9	BÍ/Bolungarvík	22	6	8	8	31	37	−6	26	
10	Leiknir R.	22	6	7	9	33	36	−3	25	
11	Höttur (R)	22	5	6	11	30	41	−11	21	Relegation to the 2. deild karla
12	ÍR (R)	22	4	2	16	19	52	−33	14	Relegation to the 2. deild karla

Updated to match(es) played on 22 September 2012. Source: ksi.is (Icelandic)
Rules for classification: 1) points; 2) goal difference; 3) number of goals scored.
(C) Champions; (P) Promoted; (R) Relegated

=== Results ===
Each team played every opponent once home and away for a total of 22 matches.

Home \ Away	KAK	BÍB	FJÖ	HAU	HÖT	ÍR	LRE	VÓL	ÞÓR	ÞRÓ	TIN	VÍK
KA		2–2	2–1	2–2	4–1	5–1	1–2	0–4	3–2	1–0	2–2	1–1
BÍ/Bolungarvík	0–0		2–2	0–0	3–1	2–1	4–3	1–2	1–2	2–0	2–5	0–0
Fjölnir	3–1	2–2		4–0	1–2	3–0	2–1	1–2	0–0	1–3	2–0	1–1
Haukar	0–2	3–0	1–0		0–0	2–1	2–1	0–2	1–0	0–3	2–0	2–0
Höttur	2–0	0–0	0–0	0–0		5–1	2–3	0–3	1–2	0–0	2–3	5–2
ÍR	3–2	1–5	0–5	0–2	2–1		2–1	0–1	1–2	0–0	0–4	0–3
Leiknir R.	1–3	2–1	0–0	2–2	6–1	2–0		1–1	1–5	1–2	1–1	0–0
Víkingur Ólafsvík	0–1	4–0	1–1	2–0	1–0	1–0	0–1		1–2	2–1	2–1	3–3
Þór A.	1–0	3–2	1–0	2–1	1–0	2–2	2–0	2–1		3–1	4–0	0–2
Þróttur Reykjavík	2–1	1–1	3–3	1–1	1–3	1–0	2–2	4–1	1–0		6–0	0–1
Tindastóll	0–0	0–1	2–1	0–1	6–2	2–4	2–1	0–1	0–1	3–1		3–1
Víkingur Reykjavík	0–1	3–0	2–6	3–1	2–2	1–0	1–1	2–1	1–3	0–1	5–0	

Source: See below
Legend: Blue = home team win; Yellow = draw; Red = away team win.

== Top goalscorers ==
As of 22 September 2012.

Rank	Player	Club	Goals	Matches	Ratio
1	Guðmundur Steinn Hafsteinsson	Víkingur Ó.	10	20	0.50
2	Hjörtur Július Hjartarson	Víkingur R.	9	20	0.45
2	Ólafur Hrannar Kristjánsson	Leiknir R.	9	20	0.45
2	Ármann Pétur Ævarsson	Þór A.	9	21	0.43
2	Sigurður Egill Lárusson	Víkingur R.	9	21	0.43
6	Elvar Þór Ægisson	Höttur	8	22	0.36
7	Ben Everson	Tindastóll	7	10	0.70
7	Helgi Pétur Magnússon	Þróttur	7	16	0.44
7	Davíð Einarsson	Höttur	7	17	0.41
7	Hallgrímur Mar Steingrímsson	KA	7	21	0.33
