= 2014 3. deild karla =

3. deild karla
- Season: 2014
- Champions: Höttur
- Promoted: Höttur; Leiknir F.
- Relegated: ÍH; Hamar
- Matches played: 90
- Goals scored: 387 (4.3 per match)
- Top goalscorer: Kristófer Páll Viðarsson (Leiknir F.) (14)
- Biggest home win: Leiknir F. 6-0 ÍH
- Biggest away win: ÍH 2-6 Hamar; Einherji 0-4 Leiknir F.
- Highest scoring: Hamar 3-6 Leiknir F. Magni 7-2 KFR

The 2014 3. deild karla (English: Men's Third Division) was the 33rd season of fourth-tier football in Iceland. Ten teams contested the league, which as of 2013 is no longer the lowest division in Iceland following the restructuring of the league pyramid. The fixtures for the 2014 campaign were released by the KSÍ on their website; play began on 17 May and concluded on 13 September.

== Teams ==
The league was contested by ten clubs, six of which played in the division during the 2013 season.

- Höttur and Hamar were relegated from the 2013 2. deild karla, replacing Fjarðabyggð and Huginn who were promoted to the 2014 2. deild karla
- Grundarfjörður, ÍH, KFR, Leiknir F., Magni and Víðir competed in the division the previous season.
- Einherji and Berserkir were promoted from the 4. deild karla in the 2013 season, replacing Augnablik and Kári who were relegated to the 2014 season of the 4. deild.

=== Club information ===
Location of teams in the 2014 3. deild karla

Team	Location	Stadium	2013 season
Berserkir	Reykjavík	Víkingsvöllur	2nd in 4. deild karla
Einherji	Vopnafjörður	Vopnafjarðarvöllur	1st in 4. deild karla
Grundarfjörður	Grundarfjörður	Grundarfjarðarvöllur	7th in 3. deild karla
Hamar	Hveragerði	Grýluvöllur	12th in 2. deild karla
Höttur	Egilsstaðir	Vilhjálmsvöllur	11th in 2. deild karla
ÍH	Hafnarfjörður	Kaplakrikavöllur	5th in 3. deild karla
KFR	Hella/Hvolsvöllur	SS-völlurinn	3rd in 3. deild karla
Leiknir F.	Fáskrúðsfjörður	Búðagrund	6th in 3. deild karla
Magni	Grenivík	Grenivíkurvöllur	8th in 3. deild karla
Víðir	Garður	Garðsvöllur	4th in 3. deild karla

== Statistics ==
=== League table ===
Pos	Team	Pld	W	D	L	GF	GA	GD	Pts	Promotion or relegation
1	Höttur (P)	18	13	2	3	42	26	+16	41	Promotion to the 2015 2. deild karla
2	Leiknir F. (P)	18	12	4	2	55	23	+32	40	Promotion to the 2015 2. deild karla
3	Berserkir	18	9	3	6	43	40	+3	30	
4	Víðir	18	7	4	7	48	41	+7	25	
5	KFR	18	8	1	9	39	40	−1	25	
6	Grundarfjörður	18	7	4	7	35	40	−5	25	
7	Magni	18	8	1	9	35	40	−5	25	
8	Einherji	18	5	5	8	24	33	−9	20	
9	ÍH (R)	18	5	3	10	32	49	−17	18	Relegation to the 2015 4. deild karla
10	Hamar (R)	18	2	1	15	34	55	−21	7	Relegation to the 2015 4. deild karla

Updated to match(es) played on 13 September 2014. Source:
Rules for classification: 1) points; 2) goal difference; 3) number of goals scored.
(P) Promoted; (R) Relegated

=== Results ===
Each team plays every opponent once home and away for a total of 18 matches per club, and 90 matches altogether.

Home \ Away	BER	EIN	GRU	HAM	HÖT	ÍH	KFR	LEF	MAG	VIÐ
Berserkir		0–0	5–3	3–0	2–5	3–3	5–2	2–2	3–0	4–3
Einherji	1–2		1–1	1–0	1–1	1–1	1–0	0–4	1–2	5–2
Grundarfjörður	2–1	2–3		5–1	2–3	1–0	2–1	1–1	2–1	3–2
Hamar	2–5	1–2	3–0		2–3	0–2	2–4	3–6	2–3	3–3
Höttur	4–1	2–1	2–1	2–1		4–2	1–2	2–2	2–0	4–3
Íþróttafélag Hafnarfjarðar	2–3	2–1	2–2	2–6	0–1		3–1	1–3	1–2	5–2
Knattspyrnufélag Rangæinga	3–2	2–2	6–1	3–1	0–2	6–1		2–0	0–1	3–2
Leiknir F.	3–0	5–0	3–1	4–2	3–2	6–0	3–2		5–1	2–2
Magni	0–2	4–3	2–3	4–3	0–2	3–4	7–2	0–2		2–2
Víðir	5–0	2–0	3–3	3–2	3–0	4–1	4–0	2–1	1–3	

Updated to match(es) played on unknown. Source:
Legend: Blue = home team win; Yellow = draw; Red = away team win.

=== Top goalscorers ===
As of 13 September 2014.

Rank	Player	Club	Goals	Matches	Ratio
1	Kristófer Páll Viðarsson	Leiknir F.	14	10	1.40
2	Helgi Ármannsson	KFR	13	17	0.76
3	Hilmar Ástþórsson	ÍH	11	13	0.84
4	Tómas Pálmason	Víðir	11	16	0.69
5	Samúel Arnar Kjartansson	Hamar	10	14	0.71
6	Bragi Emilsson	Höttur	10	15	0.67
7	Elvar Þór Ægisson	Höttur	10	16	0.63
8	Einar Guðnason	Berserkir	9	9	1.00
9	Andrés Vilhjálmsson	Magni	9	16	0.56
10	Sigurður Donys Sigurðsson	Einherji	9	18	0.50
10	Andri Steinn Hauksson	Berserkir	9	18	0.50
