= 2013 3. deild karla =

3. deild karla
- Season: 2013
- Champions: Fjarðabyggð
- Promoted: Fjarðabyggð; Huginn
- Relegated: Augnablik; Kári
- Matches played: 90
- Goals scored: 396 (4.4 per match)
- Top goalscorer: Almar Daði Jónsson (Leiknir F.) (19)
- Biggest home win: Fjarðabyggð 11-1 ÍH
- Biggest away win: Kári 1-9 Leiknir F.
- Highest scoring: Magni 10-4 Augnablik

The 2013 3. deild karla (English: Men's Third Division) was the 32nd season of fourth-tier football in Iceland. Ten teams contested the league, which as of 2013 is no longer the lowest division in Iceland following the restructuring of the league pyramid. The fixtures for the 2013 campaign were released by the KSÍ on 10 November 2012; play began on 17 May and concluded on 14 September.

== Previous season ==
The previous season the division was the lowest one in Iceland, but starting this season the 4. deild will be beneath the 3. deild. As a result, the 30 teams competing in the division last season were not just competing for two promotion places to 2. deild, but also for eight offered places in the 2013 season of the 3. deild. As a result, the remaining 20 teams were "relegated" to the new 4. deild for the 2013 season, although a couple of teams quit and a few new ones joined, as had always been the case with the 3. deild when it was the lowest division in Iceland.

== Teams ==
The league was contested by ten clubs, eight of which played in the division during the 2012 season. There are two new clubs from the previous campaign, with eight remaining of the 30 teams that competed last year, with those not mentioned below either competing in the new 4. deild or not competing this season.

- Fjarðabyggð and KFR were relegated from the 2012 2. deild karla, replacing Sindri and Ægir who were promoted to the 2013 2. deild karla
- Huginn, ÍH, Kári, Leiknir F., Magni and Víðir reached the playoffs for a place in the 2. deild karla in the 2012 3. deild karla season, but were all beaten. They stayed on in the division on virtue of having reached the playoffs. To fill the two remaining places in the division the four teams in third place in the four groups last season competed in extra playoffs to see which teams stayed on in the division. Augnablik and Grundarfjörður won their opponents and won a place in the 2013 3. deild karla.

=== Club information ===
Location of teams in the 2013 3. deild karla

Team	Location	Stadium	2012 season
Augnablik	Kópavogur	Versalavöllur	Extra playoffs in 3. deild karla
Fjarðabyggð	Fjarðabyggð	Eskifjarðarvöllur	11th in 2. deild karla
Grundarfjörður	Grundarfjörður	Grundarfjarðarvöllur	Extra playoffs in 3. deild karla
Huginn	Seyðisfjörður	Seyðisfjarðarvöllur	Reached playoffs in 3. deild karla
ÍH	Hafnarfjörður	Kaplakrikavöllur	Reached playoffs in 3. deild karla
Kári	Akranes	Norðurálsvöllurinn	Reached playoffs in 3. deild karla
KFR	Hella/Hvolsvöllur	SS-völlurinn	12th in 2. deild karla
Leiknir F.	Fáskrúðsfjörður	Búðagrund	3rd in playoffs in 3. deild karla
Magni	Grenivík	Grenivíkurvöllur	4th in playoffs in 3. deild karla
Víðir	Garður	Garðsvöllur	Reached playoffs in 3. deild karla

== Statistics ==
=== League table ===
Pos	Team	Pld	W	D	L	GF	GA	GD	Pts	Promotion or relegation
1	Fjarðabyggð (P)	18	15	0	3	67	14	+53	45	Promotion to the 2014 2. deild karla
2	Huginn (P)	18	15	0	3	55	27	+28	45	Promotion to the 2014 2. deild karla
3	KFR	18	9	1	8	38	40	−2	28	
4	Víðir	18	7	3	8	36	36	0	24	
5	ÍH	18	8	0	10	34	56	−22	24	
6	Leiknir F.	18	7	1	10	37	37	0	22	
7	Grundarfjörður	18	6	3	9	37	32	+5	21	
8	Magni	18	6	2	10	33	41	−8	20	
9	Augnablik (R)	18	6	0	12	37	57	−20	18	Relegation to the 2014 4. deild karla
10	Kári (R)	18	5	2	11	22	56	−34	17	Relegation to the 2014 4. deild karla

Updated to match(es) played on 14 September 2013. Source:
Rules for classification: 1) points; 2) goal difference; 3) number of goals scored.
(P) Promoted; (R) Relegated

=== Results ===
Each team plays every opponent once home and away for a total of 18 matches per club, and 90 matches altogether.

Home \ Away	AUG	KFF	GRU	HUG	ÍH	KÁR	KFR	LEF	MAG	VIÐ
Augnablik		1–0	1–5	1–4	6–2	4–0	3–5	0–2	6–1	1–2
Fjarðabyggð	6–1		2–1	4–0	11–1	9–0	4–0	4–0	3–0	4–1
Grundarfjörður	4–1	1–2		3–2	9–1	1–1	1–2	4–1	1–1	0–2
Huginn	4–2	1–2	2–0		7–0	4–1	4–0	3–1	3–2	3–2
ÍH	1–3	1–0	6–0	2–3		2–1	0–2	1–2	3–1	4–1
Kári	0–1	3–1	1–0	2–5	1–2		0–5	1–9	1–1	0–3
KFR	3–0	2–5	2–4	2–3	4–3	1–3		2–1	3–1	2–2
Leiknir F.	5–0	1–5	2–1	1–2	0–3	5–0	1–2		3–0	2–2
Magni	10–4	0–4	2–1	1–2	0–2	1–2	3–0	3–0		2–0
Víðir	3–2	0–1	1–1	1–3	5–0	2–5	2–1	4–1	3–4	

Updated to match(es) played on unknown. Source:
Legend: Blue = home team win; Yellow = draw; Red = away team win.

=== Top goalscorers ===
As of 14 September 2013.

Rank	Player	Club	Goals	Matches	Ratio
1	Almar Daði Jónsson	Leiknir F.	19	16	1.19
2	Jerson dos Santos	Fjarðabyggð	15	17	0.88
3	Eiríkur Viljar H Kúld	ÍH	13	16	0.81
4	Tómas Pálmason	Víðir	12	15	0.80
5	Hreggviður Heiðberg Gunnarsson	Magni	10	18	0.56
6	Einar Óli Þorvarðarson	Huginn	9	15	0.60
7	Friðjón Gunnlaugsson	Huginn	9	17	0.53
8	Marko Nikolic	Huginn	9	18	0.50
9	Darko Vidanovic	Huginn	8	12	0.67
10	Hákon Þór Sófusson	Fjarðabyggð	8	16	0.50
10	Ólafur Ívar Jónsson	Víðir	8	16	0.50
12	Víkingur Pálmason	Fjarðabyggð	8	18	0.44
