= Juraj Grizelj =

Croatian footballer (born 1986)

Personal information
- Date of birth: 3 May 1986 (age 40)
- Place of birth: Croatia
- Height: 1.81 m (5 ft 11 in)
- Position: Midfielder

Senior career*
Years	Team	Apps	(Gls)
2003–2004	Hajduk		
2004–2005	KSC		
2005–2006	Istra		
2006–2008	Šibenik	46	(0)
2008–2009	Trogir		
2009	Mosor		
2009–2011	RNK Split	18	(0)
2011–2012	Solin	9	(2)
2012	Mosor	25	(6)
2013–2014	Grindavík	40	(18)
2015–2016	KA	37	(7)
2017–2018	Keflavík	25	(1)
- * Club domestic league appearances and goals

Juraj Grizelj (born 3 May 1986) is a Croatian former footballer who played as a midfielder.

== Early life ==
Grizelj started his career with Croatian side Hajduk. He was described as a "great hope" while playing for the club.

== Playing career ==
In 2004, Grizelj signed for German side KSC. In 2005, he signed for Croatian side Istra. In 2006, he signed for Croatian side Šibenik. In 2008, he signed for Croatian side Trogir. In 2009, he signed for Croatian side Mosor. After that, he signed for Croatian side RNK Split. He helped the club achieve promotion. In 2011, he signed for Croatian side Solin. In 2012, he signed for Croatian side Mosor. In 2013, he signed for Icelandic side Grindavík. He was regarded as one of the club's most important players. In 2015, he signed for Icelandic side KA. In 2017, he signed for Croatian side Keflavík.

== Post-playing career ==
After retiring from professional football, Grizelj worked as a director of a Croatian futsal club.

== Personal life ==
Grizelj has been married. He has twin children.
