= 2012 Úrvalsdeild =

Úrvalsdeild
- Season: 2012
- Dates: 6 May – 29 September 2012
- Champions: FH
- Relegated: Grindavík; Selfoss
- Champions League: FH
- Europa League: KR; Breiðablik; ÍBV
- Matches: 132
- Goals: 425 (3.22 per match)
- Top goalscorer: Atli Guðnason (12)
- Biggest home win: FH 8–0 Fylkir
- Biggest away win: ÍA 2–7 FH
- Highest scoring: ÍA 2–7 FH
- Highest attendance: 3,054 (ÍA 3–2 KR, 10 May 2012)
- Lowest attendance: 202 (Grindavík 2–2 KR, 20 September 2012)
- Average attendance: 1,034

The 2012 Úrvalsdeild (also known as the "Pepsi-deild" for sponsorship reasons) is the 101st season of top-tier football in Iceland. The season began on 6 May 2012 and concluded 29 September 2012. The league was won by FH, the club's sixth Icelandic league title, while defending champions KR finished as runners-up, some 13 points behind FH. At the other end of the table, Grindavík and Selfoss ended the campaign in the bottom two and were thereby relegated to the 2013 1. deild karla.

== Teams ==
A total of twelve teams will contest the league, including ten sides from the 2011 season and two promoted teams from the 1. deild karla.

Þór Akureyri and Víkingur R. were relegated from 2011 Úrvalsdeild after finishing the season in the bottom two places of the league table. Both teams were relegated having just achieved promotion the season before.

2011 1. deild karla champions ÍA Akranes and runners-up Selfoss secured direct promotion to the Úrvalsdeild. ÍA returned to the Úrvalsdeild after a three-year absence while Selfoss return immediately to the top league after a one-year absence.

Location of teams in the 2012 Úrvalsdeild

Team	Location	Stadium	Stadium capacity
Breiðablik	Kópavogur	Kópavogsvöllur	5,501
FH	Hafnarfjörður	Kaplakriki	6,738
Fram	Reykjavík	Laugardalsvöllur	15,427
Fylkir	Reykjavík	Fylkisvöllur	2,872
Grindavík	Grindavík	Grindavíkurvöllur	1,750
ÍA	Akranes	Akranesvöllur	4,850
ÍBV	Vestmannaeyjar	Hásteinsvöllur	2,834
Keflavík	Keflavík	Nettóvöllurinn	4,957
KR	Reykjavík	KR-völlur	3,333
Selfoss	Selfoss	Selfossvöllur	2,000
Stjarnan	Garðabær	Stjörnuvöllur	1,292
Valur	Reykjavík	Vodafonevöllurinn	3,000

== League table ==
Pos	Team	Pld	W	D	L	GF	GA	GD	Pts	Qualification or relegation
1	FH (C)	22	15	4	3	51	23	+28	49	Qualification for the Champions League second qualifying round
2	Breiðablik	22	10	6	6	32	27	+5	36	Qualification for the Europa League first qualifying round (Note: KR, winners of the 2012 Icelandic Cup, will qualify for the first qualifying round of the UEFA Europa League.)
3	ÍBV	22	10	5	7	36	21	+15	35	Qualification for the Europa League first qualifying round
4	KR	22	10	5	7	39	32	+7	35	Qualification for the Europa League first qualifying round
5	Stjarnan	22	8	10	4	44	38	+6	34	
6	ÍA	22	9	5	8	32	36	−4	32	
7	Fylkir	22	8	7	7	30	39	−9	31	
8	Valur	22	9	1	12	34	34	0	28	
9	Keflavík	22	8	3	11	35	38	−3	27	
10	Fram	22	8	3	11	31	36	−5	27	
11	Selfoss (R)	22	6	3	13	30	44	−14	21	Relegation to 1. deild karla
12	Grindavík (R)	22	2	6	14	31	57	−26	12	Relegation to 1. deild karla

Source: ksi.is (in Icelandic)
Rules for classification: 1) points; 2) goal difference; 3) number of goals scored.
(C) Champions; (R) Relegated

=== Positions by round ===
Team ╲ Round	1	2	3	4	5	6	7	8	9	10	11	12	13	14	15	16	17	18	19	20	21	22
FH	8	4	2	2	3	2	1	1	1	1	1	1	1	1	1	1	1	1	1	1	1	1
Breiðablik	11	10	7	8	10	8	5	5	5	6	9	7	6	5	6	8	9	6	5	5	4	2
ÍBV	10	9	11	11	11	11	8	8	4	4	4	4	4	3	3	3	3	4	2	2	2	3
KR	4	8	6	4	2	3	2	2	2	2	2	2	2	2	2	2	2	2	3	3	5	4
Stjarnan	5	6	4	3	4	5	4	4	3	3	3	3	3	4	5	4	5	3	4	4	3	5
ÍA	2	2	1	1	1	1	3	3	6	7	5	6	9	7	4	6	4	5	6	6	7	6
Fylkir	6	7	10	9	7	9	7	7	7	8	6	5	5	8	9	7	8	9	8	8	6	7
Valur	3	1	3	5	9	4	6	6	8	9	8	9	8	9	8	9	6	7	9	9	8	8
Keflavík	9	3	5	7	5	6	9	9	9	5	7	8	7	6	7	5	7	8	7	7	9	9
Fram	12	12	8	10	8	10	11	11	11	10	10	10	10	10	10	10	10	10	10	10	10	10
Selfoss	1	5	9	6	6	7	10	10	10	11	11	11	11	11	11	11	11	11	11	11	11	11
Grindavík	7	11	12	12	12	12	12	12	12	12	12	12	12	12	12	12	12	12	12	12	12	12

Leader
2013–14 UEFA Europa League first qualifying round
Relegation to 1. deild karla

Source: ksi.is

== Results ==
Each team play every opponent once home and away for a total of 22 matches.

Home \ Away	BRE	FRA	FYL	GRI	FH	ÍA	ÍBV	KEF	KR	SEL	STJ	VAL
Breiðablik		0–2	1–1	2–0	0–1	0–1	1–0	0–4	2–1	1–1	2–0	1–0
Fram	3–2		4–0	4–3	0–1	2–0	2–1	0–2	1–2	0–2	1–1	0–1
Fylkir	1–1	1–0		2–1	0–1	0–1	0–4	1–1	3–2	2–0	3–3	3–1
Grindavík	2–4	2–2	2–2		0–1	2–2	1–3	0–4	2–2	0–4	1–4	2–0
FH	3–0	1–0	8–0	1–1		2–1	2–0	3–0	1–3	5–2	2–2	2–1
ÍA	1–1	0–1	2–1	2–1	2–7		0–4	3–2	3–2	4–0	1–2	1–1
ÍBV	0–0	3–2	1–1	2–1	2–2	0–0		0–1	2–0	1–0	4–1	2–0
Keflavík	2–3	5–0	0–2	2–1	2–4	2–3	1–0		1–1	2–2	0–1	0–4
KR	0–4	1–1	2–1	4–1	2–0	2–0	3–2	3–0		3–1	2–2	2–3
Selfoss	0–2	4–2	1–2	3–3	0–1	1–3	2–1	2–1	1–0		1–3	0–1
Stjarnan	1–1	4–2	2–2	3–4	2–2	1–1	1–1	1–3	1–1	4–2		3–2
Valur	3–4	0–2	1–2	4–1	3–1	2–1	0–3	4–0	0–1	3–1	0–2	

Source: ksi.is (in Icelandic)
Legend: Blue = home team win; Yellow = draw; Red = away team win.

== Top goalscorers ==
Source ksi.is (in Icelandic)

As of 29 September 2012

Rank	Player	Club	Goals
1	(Iceland) Atli Guðnason	FH	12
2	(Iceland) Kristinn Ingi Halldórsson	Fram	11
3	(Iceland) Ingimundur Níels Óskarsson	Fylkir	10
4	(Iceland) Björn Daníel Sverrisson	FH	9
4	(Denmark) Christian Olsen	ÍBV	9
4	(Iceland) Garðar Gunnlaugsson	ÍA	9
7	(Iceland) Kjartan Finnbogason	KR	8
7	(Iceland) Garðar Jóhannsson	Stjarnan	8
