= Hörður Sveinsson =

Icelandic footballer

Personal information
- Date of birth: 24 March 1983 (age 43)
- Height: 1.85 m (6 ft 1 in)
- Position: Forward

Team information
- Current team: Njarðvík

Youth career
- –2000: Keflavík

Senior career*
Years	Team	Apps	(Gls)
2000	Víðir	13	(1)
2001–2005	Keflavík	67	(19)
2006–2007	Silkeborg	34	(9)
2007	→ Tromsø (loan)	2	(0)
2008–2010	Keflavík	49	(14)
2011–2012	Valur	29	(2)
2012–2017	Keflavík	77	(30)
2018–2022	Reynir Sandgerði	55	(24)
2022-	Njarðvík	2	(0)
Total		312	(93)

International career
2001	Iceland u-19	3	(0)
2004–2005	Iceland u-21	10	(3)
- * Club domestic league appearances and goals as of 20 February 2021

Hörður Sveinsson (born 24 March 1983) is an Icelandic football striker that plays for Njarðvík.
