= Knattspyrnufélag Rangæinga =

KFR
- Full name: Knattspyrnufélag Rangæinga
- Founded: 1997
- Ground: SS-völlurinn, Hvolsvöllur
- League: 5. deild karla Group B
- 2024: 3rd

Knattspyrnufélag Rangæinga (Icelandic pronunciation: [ˈkʰnahtˌspɪ(r)tnʏˌfjɛːˌlaːɣ ˈrauŋkˌaiːjiŋka], lit. 'Rangárþing Football Club'), abbreviated as KFR, is an Icelandic football club from the towns of Hella and Hvolsvöllur, in Rangárvallasýsla.

The club represents a united team for Rangárþing (Rangárþing eystra and Rangárþing ytra). Prior to KFR's foundation the football clubs in the two towns in Rangárþing, Hekla from Hella and Baldur from Hvolsvöllur occasionally took part in the Icelandic leagues. In the years prior to KFR's foundation the clubs often fielded a merged team, calling themselves Hekla/Baldur or HB. KFR was the next step.

KFR hasn't fielded a team every season since its foundation but they've started to compete more regularly. The team achieved promotion from 3. deild in 2011 and competed in the 2012 2. deild karla, where they got relegated to 3. deild again, although this time the 3. deild isn't the lowest league in the Icelandic system following the restructuring of the league pyramid.
