= Ungmennafélagið Víkingur =

Icelandic sports club

U.M.F. Víkingur
- Full name: Ungmennafélagið Víkingur
- Nickname: The Black And Blues
- Founded: 6 October 1928; 97 years ago
- Ground: Ólafsvíkurvöllur, Ólafsvík
- Capacity: 1,130
- Chairman: Jóhann Pétursson
- Manager: Brynjar Kristmundsson
- League: 2. deild karla
- 2025: 2. deild karla, 8th of 12
Home colours	Away colours

Ungmennafélagið Víkingur (Icelandic pronunciation: [ˈuŋkˌmɛnːaˌfjɛːˌlaijɪð ˈviːciŋkʏr̥], lit. 'Viking Youth Club' (Note: Ungmennafélagið is the definite form of Ungmennafélag, meaning "the youth club".)), also known as U.M.F. Víkingur or Víkingur Ólafsvík, is an Icelandic multi-sport club from the town of Ólafsvík located on the west coast of Iceland situated on the western end of the Snæfellsnes. It was founded on 6 October 1928.

== Football ==
=== Men's football ===
Víkingur men's football team played in the Úrvalsdeild karla, the Icelandic top tier, for the first time in 2013.

==== History ====
- 1928 : Foundation of club
- 1974 : 2. deild karla [champions]
- 2003 : 3. deild karla [champions]
- 2004 : 2. deild karla [promoted]
- 2010 : 2. deild karla [champions]
- 2012 : 1. deild karla [promoted]
- 2015 : 1. deild karla [champions]

The team has spent most of its history in the lowest league, but were promoted to the second tier for the 1975 season, but were instantly relegated back to the third tier, then the lowest tier. They didn't participate every season until recently, sending a merged team with other clubs from Snæfellsnes on occasion, and were last part of such a merger in the 2002 season. They sent a team under their name for the 2003 season and were instantly promoted to 2. deild karla, where they played in 2004 and were promoted again. They finished the 2005 1. deild karla season in a respectable fifth and stayed in that division until 2009, when they were relegated. They won the 2. deild in 2010 to bounce straight back up, finishing 4th, their best ever, in 2011. In the 2012 season Víkingur finished 2nd in the league, 9 points ahead of 3rd, to be promoted to the top tier for the first time. They played in the Úrvalsdeild for the first time in 2013. The team got relegated the following season but will play again in the top division in 2016, after having won the 2015 1. deild karla.

=== Current squad ===
As of 26 July 2025

Note: Flags indicate national team as defined under FIFA eligibility rules; some limited exceptions apply. Players may hold more than one non-FIFA nationality.

No.	Pos.	Nation	Player
—	MF	ISL	Björn Darri Ásmundsson
—	FW	ISL	Asmer Begić
—	MF	BIH	Anel Crnac
—	MF	ESP	Luis Diez "Tato"
—	GK	ISL	Jón Kristinn Elíasson
—	FW	ISL	Hektor Bergmann Garðarsson
—	FW	ISL	Ellert Gauti Heiðarsson
—	DF	ISL	Kristófer Áki Hlinason
—	MF	ISL	Reynir Már Jónsson

No.	Pos.	Nation	Player
—	DF	ISL	Daði Kárason
—	MF	ISL	Björn Henry Kristjánsson
—	DF	ESP	Ivan López Cristobal
—	MF	SLE	Kwame Quee
—	MF	ESP	Luis Romero Jorge
—	MF	ISL	Ingólfur Sigurðsson
—	DF	ISL	Gabriel Þór Þórðarson
—	MF	ISL	Ingvar Freyr Þorsteinsson
—	MF	ENG	Luke Williams

For details of current and former players, see Category:Ungmennafélagið Víkingur players.

== Basketball ==
=== Men's basketball ===
Víkingur men's basketball team last played in the 2. deild karla during the 2012–2013 season when it finished last in Group A.

=== Seasons ===
Results of league and cup competitions by season
Season	Division	P	W	L	PTS	F	A	Pos	Playoffs	Icelandic Cup
Season	League								Playoffs	Icelandic Cup
2010-2011	2. deild Group B	14	6	8	12	1013/	1142	5th	DNQ	R2
2011-2012	2. deild Group A	16	8	8	16	1093	1125	1st	R1	R2
2012-2013	2. deild Group A	14	0	14	0	687	1109	1st	DNQ	N/A
