= Valbjarnarvöllur =

Football stadium in Reykjavík, Iceland

Eimskipsvöllurinn
- Interactive map of Eimskipsvöllurinn
- Former names: Þróttarvöllur
- Location: Reykjavík, Iceland
- Coordinates: 64°8′36.92″N 21°52′33.64″W
- Owner: Þróttur Reykjavík
- Operator: Þróttur Reykjavík
- Capacity: 5,478
- Surface: Artificial grass

Tenant
- Þróttur Reykjavík

Valbjarnarvöllur (Icelandic pronunciation: [ˈvalˌpja(r)tnaˌvœtlʏr̥], lit. 'Valbjörn Field' or more precisely 'Valbjörn Stadium', named after the track and field athlete Valbjörn Þorláksson), also known as Eimskipsvöllurinn ([ˈeimˌscɪpsˌvœtlʏrɪn], lit. 'Eimskip Field' (Note: völlurinn is the definite form of völlur, meaning "the field".) or 'Eimskip Stadium') for sponsorship reasons, is a football stadium in Reykjavík, Iceland. It is the home stadium of Þróttur Reykjavík who play in the Úrvalsdeild. The stadium has a capacity of 5,478 fans.

In December 2016, Þróttur Reykjavík announced a three-year sponsorship deal with local shipping company Eimskip until 2019, which would see the stadium name changed to Eimskipsvöllurinn for the duration of the deal.
