= Grindavíkurvöllur =

Sports venue in Grindavík, Iceland

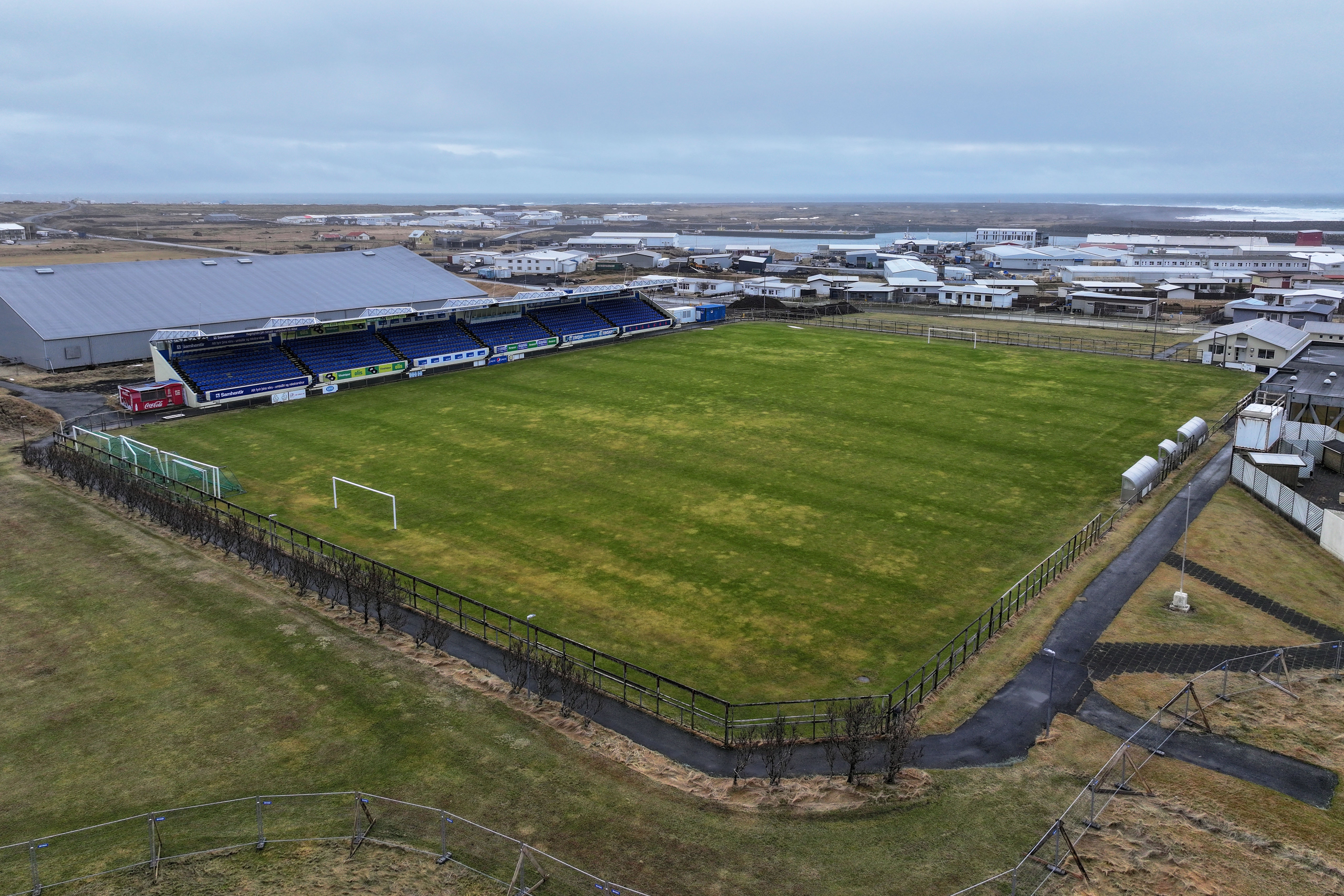
- Interactive map of Grindavíkurvöllur
- Location: Grindavík
- Coordinates: 63°50′40.69″N 22°25′46.66″W
- Operator: Ivan Jugovic
- Capacity: 1450
- Surface: Grass

Tenant
- Knattspyrnudeild UMFG

Grindavíkurvöllur (Icelandic pronunciation: [ˈkrɪntaˌviːkʏrˌvœtlʏr̥], lit. 'Grindavík Field' or more precisely 'Grindavík Stadium') is a multi-use stadium in Grindavík, Iceland. It is currently used mostly for football matches and is the home stadium of Knattspyrnudeild UMFG. It has a capacity of about 1,450 people.
