= Torfnesvöllur =

Icelandic football stadium

Coordinates: 66°04′23″N 23°08′10″W

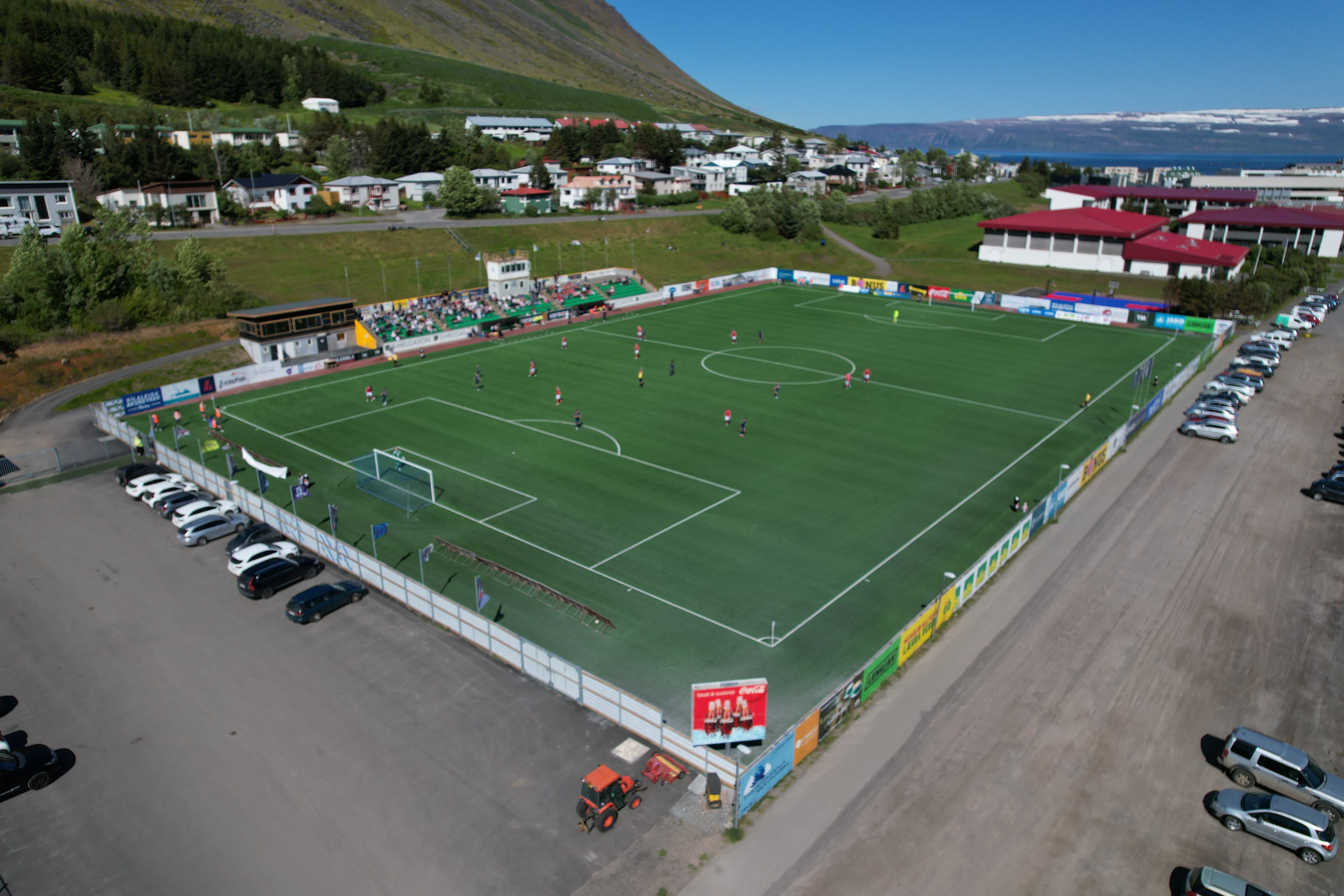
- Interactive map of Torfnesvöllur
- Location: Torfnes, Ísafjarðarbær; Iceland
- Owner: Ísafjarðarbær
- Operator: Vestri
- Capacity: 1.596
- Surface: Grass
- Field size: 105 × 70 m

Construction
- Groundbreaking: 1963
- Opened: 18 July 1964

Tenants
- ÍBÍ (1964–1988); Vestri (1986-present); Hörður (2014-present)

Torfnesvöllur (Icelandic pronunciation: [ˈtʰɔrvˌnɛsˌvœtlʏr̥], lit. 'Torfnes Field' or more precisely 'Torfnes Stadium'), known as Kerecisvöllurinn (lit. 'Kerecis Field' (Note: völlurinn is the definite form of völlur, meaning "the field".) or 'Kerecis Stadium') for sponsorship reasons, is a football stadium in Ísafjörður, Iceland and the home of Vestri and Knattspyrnufélagið Hörður. It broke ground in 1963 and was opened on 18 July 1964.

== Sponsorship names ==
The stadium was known as Olísvöllurinn (lit. 'Olís Field' or 'Olís Stadium') from 2018 to 2024. In February 2024, Icelandic biotech company Kerecis bought the naming rights for the stadium.
