= Ólafsvík =

- Town
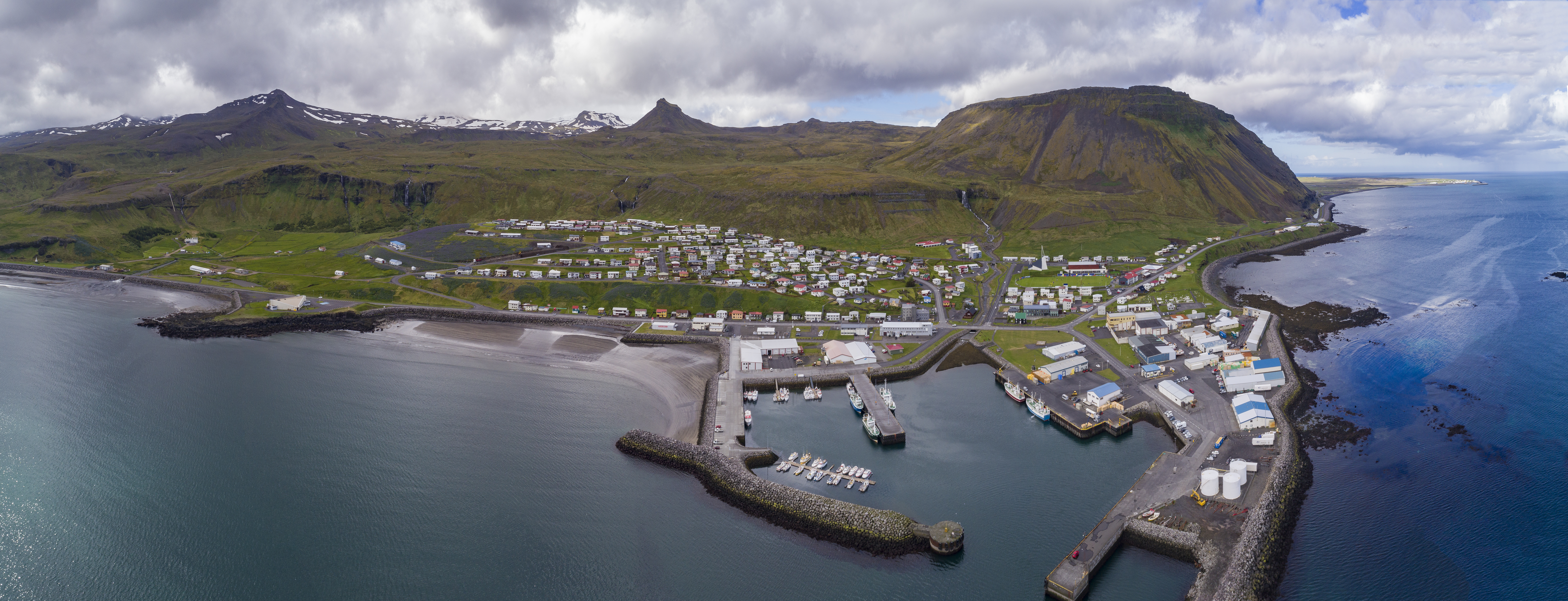
- Aerial panorama of the town in 2017

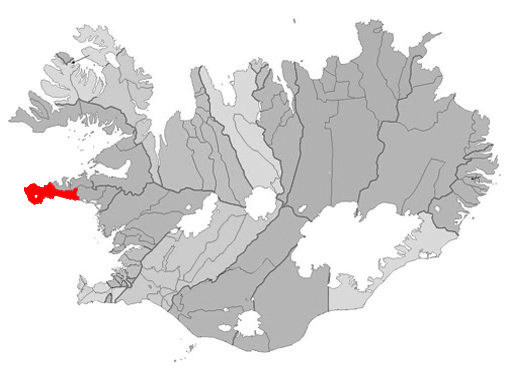
- Location of the Municipality of Snæfellsbær

- Location in Iceland
- Coordinates: 64°53′N 23°42′W
- Country: Iceland
- Constituency: Northwest Constituency
- Region: Western Region
- Municipality: Snæfellsbær

Population (2011)
  - Total: 1,010
- Time zone: UTC+0 (GMT)

Ólafsvík (Icelandic pronunciation: [ˈouːˌlafsˌviːk]) is a small town in Iceland on the northern side of the Snæfellsnes Peninsula. At one point in the 17th and 18th centuries, commercial vessels sailed between Ólafsvík and Denmark, and the village was one of the larger trading ports in Iceland. Ólafsvík became a certified trading place, authorized by the Danish King and Danish authorities, in 1687.

It is situated near the western end of the Snæfellsnes peninsula, on the north coast of the peninsula. It is on route 54, between Grundarfjörður and Hellissandur. At 23 degrees 42 minutes West, it is the westernmost settlement of its size in Europe.

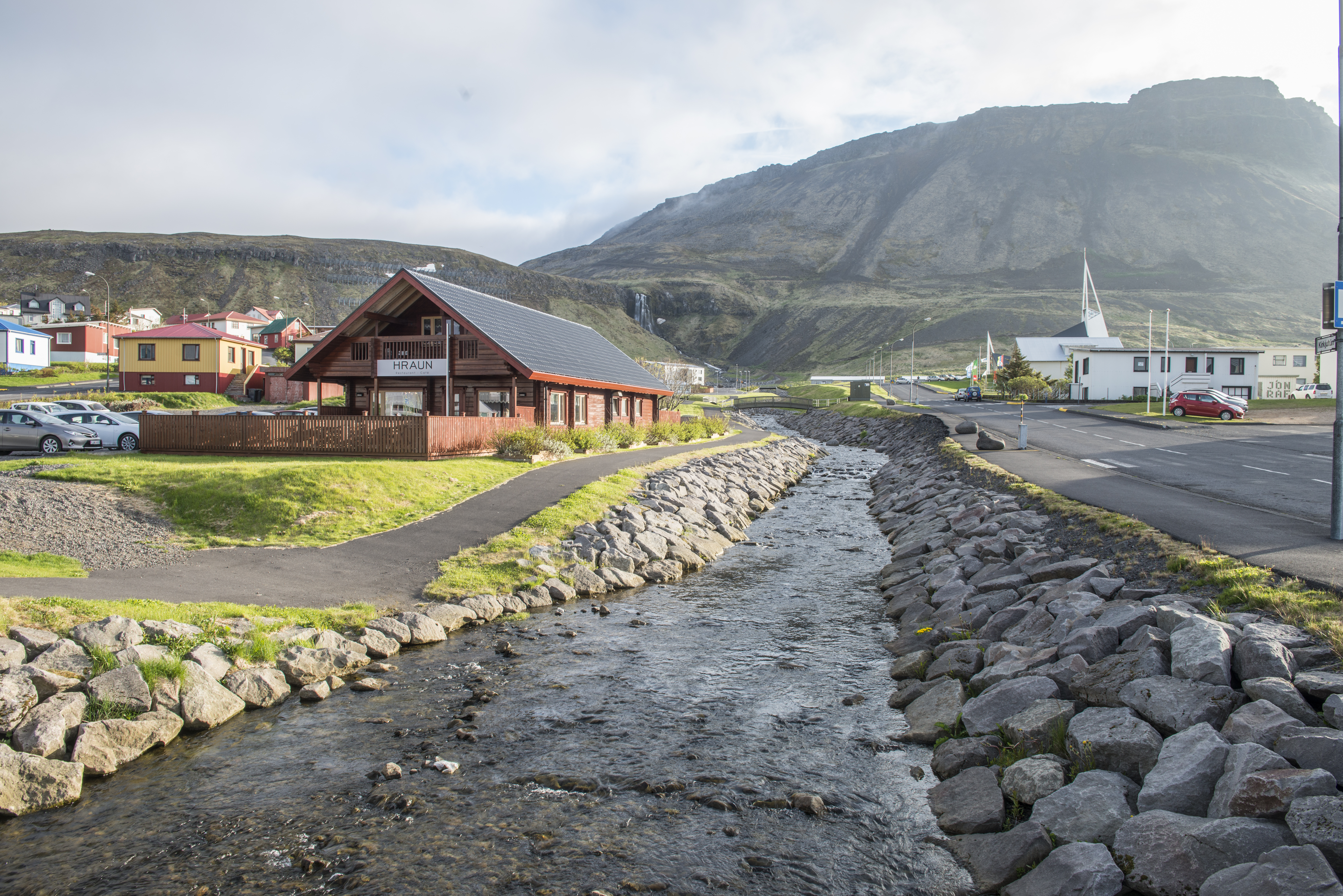
Olafsvik, a township in Snaefellsnes, Iceland.

Administratively it is in the Western Region and it is the administrative centre of the municipality of Snæfellsbær which also includes the tiny villages of Arnarstapi, Hellnar, Rif and Hellissandur.

As of 1 January 2011, it had 1,010 inhabitants.

== Overview ==
Ólafsvík Church

Perhaps because of its situation on the bay of Breiðafjörður, the village was the first in Iceland to receive a commercial licence from the King of Denmark, in the 17th century. Ólafsvík's economy is based on fishing industry and commerce, and provision of services for farmers in the area.

The area of Ólafsvík provides many opportunities for tourists, such as birdwatching, hiking trails, long sandy beaches, and snowmobiling on the Snæfellsjökull glacier, just 10 km away (although the road is closed for much of the year).

At nearby Hellissandur is the tallest structure in Western Europe, the Gufuskálar radio mast, 412 metres high.

== See also ==
- List of cities and towns in Iceland
- Volcanism of Iceland
