= Ungmennafélagið Tindastóll =

Multi-sport club in Iceland

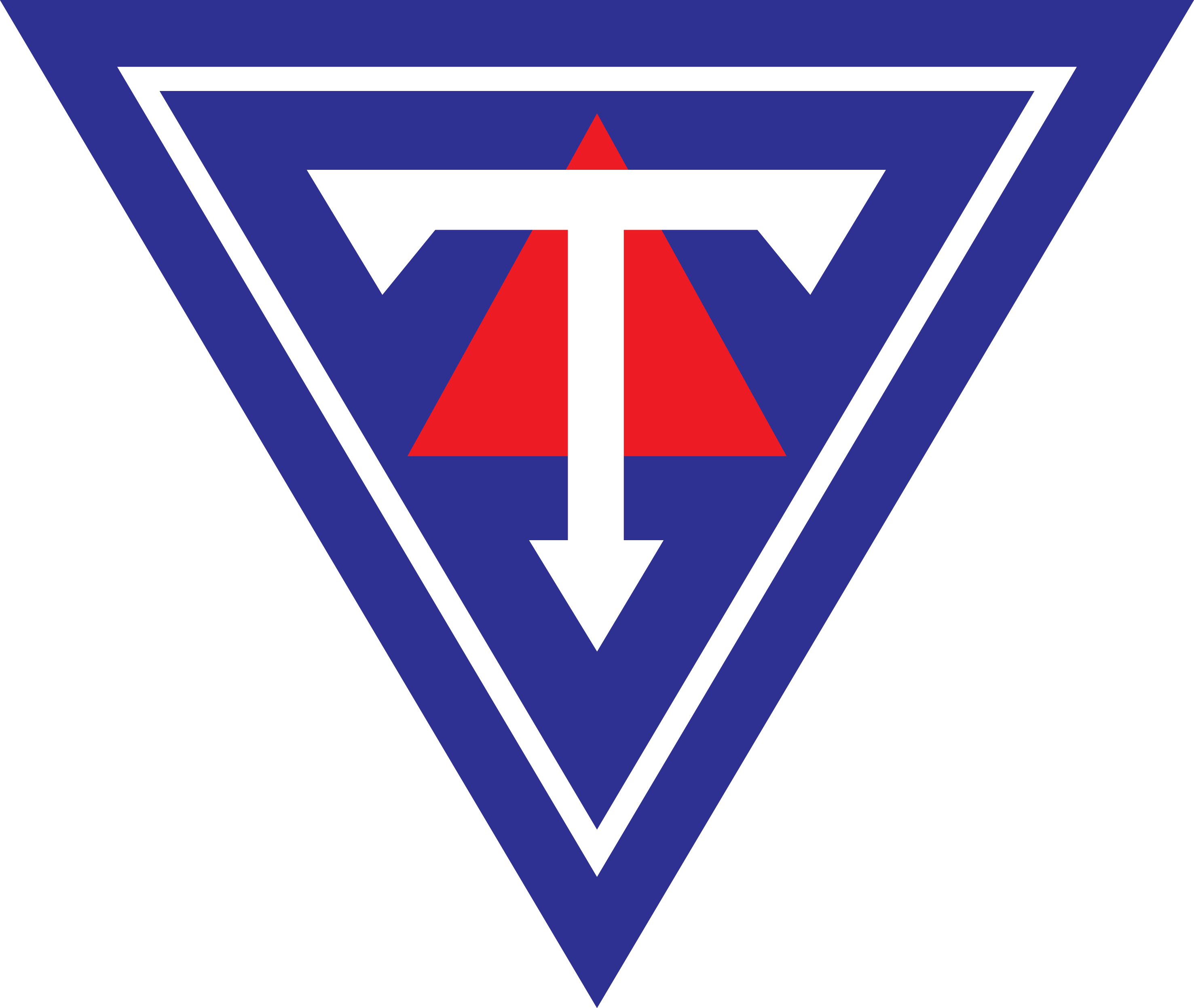
- Full name: Ungmennafélag Tindastóll
- Short name: Tindastóll
- Founded: 1907
- Based in: Sauðárkrókur
- Colours: Blue, Red, White
- Website: tindastóll.is

Ungmennafélagið Tindastóll (Icelandic pronunciation: [ˈuŋkˌmɛnːaˌfjɛːˌlaijɪð ˈtʰɪntaˌstoutl̥], lit. 'Tindastóll Youth Club' (Note: Ungmennafélagið is the definite form of Ungmennafélag, meaning "the youth club".)), commonly known as Tindastóll, is an Icelandic sports club founded in 1907 and based in Sauðárkrókur. Tindastóll is a multisport club and is best known for its men's basketball team which plays in the top-tier Úrvalsdeild karla.

== Basketball ==
Tindastóll men's basketball team advanced to the Úrvalsdeild karla Finals in 2015 and 2018, losing to KR both times. On January 13, 2018, the club won its first major title when it beat KR in the Icelandic Basketball Cup finals.

== Football ==
Tindastóll's football department fields teams in both the men's and women's league. In September 2020, Tindastóll women's team achieved promotion to the top-tier Úrvalsdeild kvenna for the first time in its history.
