= 2020 Icelandic Cup =

Icelandic Cup - Mjólkurbikarinn

Tournament details
- Country: Iceland
- Date: 5 June – 10 September 2020 (Remaining matches cancelled)

Final positions
- Champions: Not awarded

Tournament statistics
- Matches played: 28
- Goals scored: 121 (4.32 per match)

The 2020 Icelandic Cup, also known as Mjólkurbikarinn for sponsorship reasons, was the 61st edition of the Icelandic national football cup.

The competition was abandoned on 30 October 2020 before the semi-finals due to the COVID-19 pandemic in Iceland.

== First round ==
56 clubs competed in the first round. The matches were played from 5–8 June 2020.

5 June 2020	ÍR (3)	3–1	Knattspyrnufélagið Ásvellir (5)	Hertz-völlurinn, Reykjavík
19:15

5 June 2020	UMF Selfoss (3)	5–0	Snæfell (5)	JÁVERK-völlur, Selfoss
19:15	Tyrfingsson 21', 45', 49', 81' (pen.), 86' (pen.)

5 June 2020	Smári (5)	0–4	Njarðvík (3)	Fagrilundur Gervigras, Kópavogur
19:15

6 June 2020	Hvíti Riddarinn (5)	2–1	KFS (5)	Fagverksvöllurinn Varmá, Mosfellsbær
13:00

6 June 2020	Vængir Júpiters (4)	3–1	KH (5)	Fjölnisvöllur, Grafarvogur
13:00

6 June 2020	Haukar (3)	3–1	Elliði (4)	Ásvellir, Hafnarfjörður
13:00	Ásgeirsson 3'; Gíslason 80'; Ingason 84'		Óskarsson 62'

6 June 2020	KV (4)	0–3 (a.e.t.)	Kári (3)	KV-Park við Frostaskjól, Reykjavík
13:00

6 June 2020	Hörður Ísafirði (5)	1–4	Vestri (2)	Olísvöllurinn, Hnífsdalur
14:00	Gudmundsson 61'		Fall 4'; Bjarnason 12', 58'; Júlíusson 51'

6 June 2020	Dalvík/Reynir (3)	1–2	KF (3)	Dalvíkurvöllur, Dalvík
14:00

6 June 2020	Höttur (4)	2–1 (a.e.t.)	Sindri (4)	Vilhjálmsvöllur, Egilsstaðir
14:00	Magnússon 58'

6 June 2020	Kría (5)	2–3	Hamar (5)	Vivaldivöllurinn, Seltjarnarnes
14:00

6 June 2020	Mídas (5)	4–1	KM Reykjavík (5)	Víkingsvöllur, Reykjavík
14:00

6 June 2020	Skallagrímur (5)	0–2	Ýmir Kópavogur (5)	Skallagrímsvöllur, Borgarnes
14:00

6 June 2020	Vatnaliljur (5)	0–12	Afturelding (2)	Fagrilundur Gervigras, Kópavogur
14:00			Svanthórsson 17', 31', 37', 44', 82'; Jónasson 22', 79'; Davorsson 30'; Davorsson 57', 71'

6 June 2020	Álftaness (4)	0–4	Fram Reykjavík (2)	Bessastaðavöllur, Álftanes
14:00			þorláksson 18', 41'; Saraiva 28', 39'

6 June 2020	Þróttur Vogum (3)	2–1	Ægir Þorlákshöfn (4)	Vogabæjarvöllur, Vogar
14:00

6 June 2020	KFG (4)	7–1	KB (5)	Stjörnuvöllur, Garðabær
16:00

6 June 2020	Þróttur Reykjavík (2)	1–0	Álafoss (5)	Valbjarnarvöllur, Reykjavík
18:00

7 June 2020	Tindastóll (4)	2–1	Kormákur/Hvöt (5)	Sauðárkróksvöllur, Sauðárkrókur
14:00

7 June 2020	Samherjar (5)	3–0	KF Nökkvi (6)	Hrafnagilsvöllur, Hrafnagil
14:00

7 June 2020	KFB (5)	1–5	Víðir (3)	Bessastaðavöllur, Álftanes
14:00

7 June 2020	Ísbjörninn (5)	4–5	Skautafélagið Björninn (5)	Kórinn Gervigrasvöllur, Kópavogur
14:00

7 June 2020	KFR (5)	0–2	GG (5)	Hvolsvöllur, Hvolsvöllur
14:00

7 June 2020	SR (5)	2–0	Uppsveitir (5)	Eimskipsvöllurinn, Reykjavík
14:00

7 June 2020	UMF Stokkseyri (5)	3–1	Afrík Reykjavík (5)	Stokkseyrarvöllur, Stokkseyri
16:00

7 June 2020	Árborg (5)	0–0 (8–7 p)	Augnablik (4)	Selfossvöllur, Selfoss
17:00

7 June 2020	Léttir (5)	1–9	Reynir Sandgerði (4)	ÍR-völlur, Reykjavík
19:00

8 June 2020	Íþróttafélag Hafnarfjarðar (5)	3–1	Knattspyrnufélagið Berserkir (5)	Ásvellir, Hafnarfjörður
20:00	Friðiksson 65'; Leifsson 74', 90+3' (pen.)		Þrándarson 80'

== Second round ==
A total of forty teams competed in the second round. Ties were played from 12–14 June.

12 June 2020	Hvíti Riddarinn (5)	0–1	UMF Selfoss (3)	Fagverksvöllurinn Varmá, Mosfellsbær
19:15

12 June 2020	Völsungur (3)	2–2 (a.e.t.) (4–5 p)	Þór Akureyri (2)	Húsavíkurvöllur, Húsavík
19:15

12 June 2020	Leiknir Reykjavík (2)	5–0	Kári (3)	Leiknisvöllur, Reykjavík
19:15	Hilmarsson 31'; Matthíasson 58', 86', 89' (pen.); Magnússon 60'

12 June 2020	Kórdrengir (3)	6–0	Hamar (5)	Framvöllur, Reykjavík
19:15

12 June 2020	Keflavík (2)	5–0	Björninn (5)	Keflavíkurvöllur, Keflavík
19:15	Gibbs 5'; Heras 48', 68', 90+4'; Arnarsson 85'

12 June 2020	Ýmir Kópavogur (5)	1–4	ÍR Reykjavík (3)	Versalavöllur, Kópavogur
19:15

12 June 2020	Mídas (5)	0–4	SR (5)	Víkingsvöllur, Reykjavík
23:00

12 June 2020	IH (5)	3–0	GG (5)	Ásvellir, Hafnarfjörður
23:30

13 June 2020	Haukar (3)	1–2 (a.e.t.)	Fram Reykjavík (2)	Ásvellir, Hafnarfjörður
14:00	Þórðarson 62'		Bjartþórsson 23'; Guðjónsson 103'

13 June 2020	Tindastóll (4)	2–1	Samherjar (5)	Sauðárkróksvöllur, Sauðárkrókur
14:00	Rae 63'; Ólafsson 90+1'		Gunnarsson 30' (pen.)

13 June 2020	KFG (4)	0–5	Afturelding (2)	Stjörnuvöllur, Garðabær
14:00			Sigurðarson 9'; Svanthórsson 10'; Jónasson 11', 83'; Hlífarsson 31'

13 June 2020	Leiknir Fáskrúðsfirði (2)	3–1	Einherji (4)	Búðagrund, Fáskrúðsfjörður
14:00	Krasnovskis 45'; Magnússon 59'; Mourad 76'

13 June 2020	UMF Stokkseyri (5)	2–8	Reynir Sandgerði (4)	Stokkseyrarvöllur, Stokkseyri
14:00			Pajic 18', 88'; Magnússon 21'; Wiktorowicz 29'; Johansson 67'; Renato 72'; Björnsson 77', 90'

13 June 2020	Vængir Júpiters (4)	2–1	Víðir (3)	Fjölnisvöllur, Grafarvogur
14:00

13 June 2020	Þróttur Reykjavík (2)	3–1	Vestri (2)	Valbjarnarvöllur, Reykjavík
14:00	Bjarnason 47', 73'; Panic 80'		Benónýsson 45+1'

13 June 2020	Grindavík (2)	1–5	IBV (2)	Grindavíkurvöllur, Grindavík
16:00	Johannsson 90+3'		Martin 1', 51', 85' (pen.); Telmo 8', 62'

13 June 2020	Þróttur Vogum (3)	1–2	Víkingur Ólafsvík (2)	Vogabæjarvöllur, Vogar
16:00			Zamorano 27', 74'

13 June 2020	Njarðvík (3)	1–1 (a.e.t.) (3–4 p)	Árborg (5)	Rafholtsvöllurinn, Njarðvík
17:00

14 June 2020	KF (3)	2–2 (5–6 p)	Magni Grenivík (2)	Ólafsfjarðarvöllur, Ólafsfjörður
14:00	Þórðarson 81'; Einarsson 116'		Þórisson 47'; Rósbergsson 120+1' (pen.)

14 June 2020	Höttur (4)	2–1	Fjarðabyggðar (3)	Vilhjálmsvöllur, Egilsstaðir
14:00	Magnússon 57'; Bjarkason 84'		Sakaluk 3'

== Third round (round of 32) ==
A total of 32 teams competed in this round of the competition, with the clubs from the Úrvalsdeild entering at this stage. Ties were played from 23–25 June.

23 June 2020	Fram (2)	3–1	ÍR (3)	Laugardalsvöllur, Reykjavík
18:00	Ingason 23'; Adalsteinsson 36'; Thordason 90+5'	Report	Agustsson 22'

23 June 2020	ÍBV (2)	7–0	Tindastóll (4)	Hásteinsvöllur, Vestmannaeyjar
18:00	Ingason 5', 52'; Martin 68', 87', 90+2'; Elíasson 71'; Sigurdsson 82'	Report

23 June 2020	SR (5)	0–3	Valur (1)	Eimskipsvöllurinn, Reykjavík
19:15		Report	Lárusson 33'; Petry 53'; Bjarnason 90+2'

23 June 2020	Vængir Júpiters (4)	1–8	KR (1)	Fjölnisvöllur, Grafarvogur
19:15	Morina 6'	Report	Finnbogason 4'; Geirsson 31'; Jónasson 50', 81' (pen.), 90'; Punyed 66'; Bjarnason 90+2'; Chopart 90+3'

23 June 2020	Afturelding (2)	3–0	Árborg (5)	Varmárvollur, Mosfellsbær
19:15	Zambrano 54' (pen.); Kristjánsson 59' (o.g.); Svansson 63'	Report

23 June 2020	Grótta (1)	3–0	Höttur/Huginn (4)	Vivaldivöllurinn, Seltjarnarnes
20:15	Sigurðarson 24'; Árnason 66'; Eyjólfsson 86'	Report

24 June 2020	KA (1)	6–0	Leiknir Reykjavík (2)	Akureyrarvöllur, Akureyri
18:00	Þórisson 6', 74'; Qvist 40'; H. M. Steingrímsson 54'; G. Stefánsson 61'; Þorsteinsson 90'	Report

24 June 2020	Magni (2)	1–2	HK (1)	Grenivíkurvöllur, Grenivík
18:00	Gautason 17'	Report	Ingason 72'; Arnarson 87' (pen.)

24 June 2020	Þór Akureyri (2)	2–1 (a.e.t.)	Reynir Sandgerði (4)	Þórsvöllur, Akureyri
20:00	Sverrisson 78'; Kristjánsson 117' (pen.)	Report	Fufura 18'

24 June 2020	Knattspyrnufélagið Þróttur (2)	1–2	FH (1)	Valbjarnarvöllur, Reykjavík
19:15	Panić 31'	Report	Beck 5', 55'

24 June 2020	Kórdrengir (3)	2–3 (a.e.t.)	ÍA (1)	Framvöllur, Reykjavík
19:15	Matthíasson 9'; E. Einarsson 81'	Report	V. Jónsson 69'; H. Jónsson 85'; Þórðarson 110'

24 June 2020	Fjölnir (1)	3–2	Selfoss (3)	Fjölnisvöllur, Reykjavík
19:15	Sigurðsson 24'; Hafþórsson 31'; Ström 68'	Report	Tyrfingsson 12'; Jóhannsson 29'

24 June 2020	ÍH (5)	0–8	Fylkir (1)	Ásvellir, Hafnarfjörður
20:00		Report	Guðjohnsen 26', 36' (pen.); Stefánsson 29'; Ragnarsson 32' (pen.), 42'; Gunnarsson 40' (o.g.); H. Jónsson 78'; A. Jónsson 90+1'

24 June 2020	Stjarnan (1)	3–0	Leiknir Fáskrúðs (2)	Stjörnuvöllur, Garðabær
20:15	Atlason 55'; Brorsen 58'; Konráðsson 77'	Report

25 June 2020	Víkingur Ólafsvík (2)	1–1 (4–5 p)	Víkingur Reykjavík (1)	Ólafsvíkurvöllur, Ólafsvík
19:15	Zamorano 42'	Report	Guðjónsson 90+1'

25 June 2020	Breiðablik (1)	3–2	Keflavík (2)	Kópavogsvöllur, Kópavogur
19:15	Sigurðarson 32'; Steindórsson 81', 86'	Report	Sigurgeirsson 50'; Williams 66'

== Fourth round (round of 16) ==
A total of sixteen teams competed in the fourth round, with matches played on 30 and 31 July.

30 July 2020	KA (1)	1–3 (a.e.t.)	ÍBV (2)	Akureyrarvöllur, Akureyri
17:30	H. M. Steingrímsson 20'	Report	Vergara 8'; Þórvarðarson 98'; Martin 120+1'	Referee: Helgi Mikael Jónasson

30 July 2020	FH (1)	3–1	Þór (2)	Kaplakriki, Hafnarfjörður
18:00	Hafsteinsson 2'; Helgason 61'; Lennon 68'	Report	Sigþórsson 89'	Referee: Einar Ingi Jóhannsson

30 July 2020	Breiðablik (1)	3–0	Grótta (1)	Kópavogsvöllur, Kópavogur
19:15	Quee 45+2'; Eyjólfsson 66'; Willumsson 85'	Report		Referee: Sigurður Hjörtur Þrastarson

30 July 2020	KR (1)	2–0	Fjölnir (1)	KR-völlur, Reykjavík
19:15	Hauksson 54'; Finnbogasson 62'	Report		Referee: Egill Arnar Sigurþórsson

30 July 2020	Fram (2)	1–1 (4–3 p)	Fylkir (1)	Laugardalsvöllur, Reykjavík
19:15	Saraiva 90+4'	Report	Hafþórsson 45'	Referee: Kristinn Friðrik Hrafnsson
	Penalties
	Hafsteinsson (penalty scored); Guðjónsson (penalty scored); Þórðarson (penalty missed); Ólafsson (penalty scored); Saraiva (penalty scored)		Hewson (penalty scored); Ingimundarson (penalty scored); Stefánsson (penalty scored); Ólafsson (penalty missed); Eythórsson (penalty missed)

30 July 2020	HK (1)	6–2	Afturelding (2)	Kórinn, Kópavogur
19:15	Júlíusson 15', 77'; Arnarson 19'; Ljubicic 45'; Gissurarson 89'; Sigurpálsson 90'	Report	Jónasson 3'; Davorsson 52'	Referee: Erlendur Eiríksson

30 July 2020	Víkingur R. (1)	1–2	Stjarnan (1)	Víkingsvöllur, Reykjavík
20:00	Hansen 58'	Report	Atlason 1'; Halldórsson 54'	Referee: Þorvaldur Árnason

31 July 2020	Valur (1)	3-1	ÍA (1)	Hlíðarendi, Reykjavík
19:15	1-0 Goal 12' 2-0 Goal 69' 3-1 Goal 90+3'	Report	2-1 Goal 74'

== Quarter-finals (round of 8) ==
A total of eight teams competed in the quarter-finals, with matches played on 25 August and 10 September.

25 August 2020	ÍBV (2)	2–1	Fram (2)	Hásteinsvöllur, Vestmannaeyjar
17:15	Kjartansson 60'; Eysteinsson 90+1'	Report	Saraiva 20'	Referee: Sigurður Hjörtur Þrastarson

10 September 2020	FH (1)	3–0	Stjarnan (1)	Kaplakrikavöllur, Hafnarfjörður
16:30	Lennon 24'; Finsen 45+1'; Helgason 57'	Report		Referee: Helgi Mikael Jónasson

10 September 2020	Breiðablik (1)	2–4	KR (1)	Kópavogsvöllur, Kópavogur
19:15	Willumsson 69'; Sigurðarson 84'	Report	Jónasson 42', 52'; Sigurjónsson 45+2'; Finnbogason 82'	Referee: Einar Ingi Jóhannsson

10 September 2020	Valur (1)	2–1 (a.e.t.)	HK (1)	Hlíðarendi, Reykjavík
19:15	Bartalsstovu 6'; Lárusson 102'	Report	Gunnarsson 88'	Referee: Erlendur Eiríksson

== Semi-finals (round of 4) ==
A total of four teams were originally scheduled to compete in the semi-finals, with matches played on 4 November.

4 November 2020	Valur (1)	Cancelled	KR (1)	Hlíðarendi, Reykjavík
19:15		Report

4 November 2020	ÍBV (2)	Cancelled	FH (1)	Hásteinsvöllur, Vestmannaeyjar
19:15		Report

== Final ==
Two teams were originally scheduled to contest the final, with the match played on 8 November.

8 November 2020	Valur (1) / KR (1)	Cancelled	ÍBV (2) / FH (1)
		Report
