= 2024 3. deild karla =

3. deild karla
- Season: 2024
- Champions: Kári
- Promoted: Kári; Víðir
- Relegated: Ellíði; Vængir Júpiters

The 2024 3. deild karla (English: Men's Third Division) was the 70th season of fourth-tier Icelandic football. The season began on 3 May and finished on 14 September 2024.

The title winners (Kári) and runners-up (Víðir) were promoted to the 2025 2. deild karla, whilst the bottom two teams (Ellíði and Vængir Júpiters) were relegated to the 2025 4. deild karla.

== Teams ==
The league consisted of twelve teams; eight teams remaining from the previous season, two teams promoted from the 4. deild karla, and two teams relegated from the 2. deild karla.

The promoted teams were 2023 4. deild karla champions Vængir Júpiters and runners-up KFK Kópavogur (replacing the 2023 3. deild karla relegated teams KFS and Ýmir). The relegated teams were 2023 2. deild karla bottom two teams KV and Sindri (replacing the 2023 3. deild karla promoted teams Hvöt Blönduós and Reynir).

=== Stadia and locations ===
Team	Location	Stadium
Augnablik	Kópavogur	Kópavogsvöllur
Ellíði	Reykjavík (Árbær)	Würth völlurinn
Hvíti Riddarinn	Mosfellsbær	Varmárvöllur
KFK Kópavogur	Kópavogur	Fagrilundur Gervigras
KV	Reykjavík	KV-Park við Frostaskjól
Magni	Grenivík	Grenivíkurvöllur
Sindri	Höfn	Sindravellir
Vængir Júpiters	Grafarvogur	Fjölnisvöllur
Víðir	Garður	Nesfisk-völlurinn
Árbær	Reykjavík	Würth völlurinn
ÍH	Hafnarfjörður	Skessan

== League table ==
Pos	Team	Pld	W	D	L	GF	GA	GD	Pts	Promotion or relegation
1	Kári (C, P)	22	14	5	3	63	25	+38	47	Promotion to 2. deild karla
2	Víðir (P)	22	13	6	3	54	25	+29	45	Promotion to 2. deild karla
3	Árbær	22	14	3	5	47	32	+15	45	
4	Augnablik	22	12	4	6	46	30	+16	40	
5	Magni	22	9	6	7	35	38	−3	33	
6	Hvíti Riddarinn	22	8	2	12	45	49	−4	26	
7	ÍH	22	7	4	11	61	63	−2	25	
8	KV	22	8	1	13	36	50	−14	25	
9	KFK Kópavogur	22	8	1	13	39	59	−20	25	
10	Sindri	22	7	3	12	40	49	−9	24	
11	Ellíði (R)	22	7	2	13	32	54	−22	23	Relegation to 4. deild karla
12	Vængir Júpiters (R)	22	5	3	14	37	61	−24	18	Relegation to 4. deild karla

Source: Soccerway
Rules for classification: 1) Points; 2) Goal difference; 3) Goals scored; 4) Head-to-head points; 5) Head-to-head goal difference; 6) Head-to-head goals scored; 7) Head-to-head away goals scored; 8) Play-off (only for deciding champion); 9) Draw.
(C) Champions; (P) Promoted; (R) Relegated

== Results ==
Each team played each other twice (22 matches each), once at home and once away.

Home \ Away	AUG	ELL	HVÍ	KÁR	KÓP	KVR	MAG	SIN	VÆN	VÍĐ	ÁRB	ÍHH
Augnablik	—	3–0	2–1	2–5	4–1	2–0	2–0	2–2	3–1	1–1	1–1	3–5
Ellíði	1–0	—	3–4	0–3	2–1	3–2	1–1	3–2	1–0	1–2	0–1	3–5
Hvíti Riddarinn	1–4	1–3	—	0–2	5–0	0–3	1–2	1–1	2–3	0–1	2–3	3–4
Kári	1–1	4–0	1–2	—	7–3	4–0	1–1	0–1	5–5	1–1	3–0	5–2
KFK Kópavogur	0–2	2–1	1–2	0–3	—	2–6	3–0	3–0	1–4	2–3	1–3	3–8
KV	0–3	2–0	0–2	0–2	1–3	—	2–3	3–4	2–5	1–0	2–0	2–1
Magni	2–1	1–1	2–1	0–4	1–1	2–1	—	3–1	8–1	0–1	1–1	2–2
Sindri	0–3	4–2	4–7	1–2	1–2	1–4	2–3	—	0–1	0–2	0–3	4–1
Vængir Júpiters	1–3	0–2	1–5	0–4	2–3	2–2	3–1	1–3	—	1–2	3–6	1–2
Víðir	3–0	7–1	6–1	0–2	3–2	8–0	2–0	1–1	1–1	—	1–2	4–3
Árbær	2–1	3–1	1–2	3–1	1–2	1–0	5–0	1–5	1–0	2–2	—	4–2
ÍH	2–3	6–3	2–2	3–3	0–3	2–3	1–2	1–3	4–1	3–3	2–3	—

Source: Soccerway
Legend: Blue = home team win; Yellow = draw; Red = away team win.
