= 2020 2. deild karla =

2. deild karla
- Season: 2020

The 2020 2. deild karla is the 55th season of third-tier football in Iceland. Twelve teams contest the league. The season began on 18 June 2020.

== Teams ==
=== Club information ===
Location of teams in the 2018 2. deild karla

Team	Location	Stadium	Capacity
Dalvík/Reynir	Dalvík	Dalvíkurvöllur	2,000
KF	Ólafsfjörður	Ólafsfjarðarvöllur	2,100
Haukar	Hafnarfjörður	Ásvellir	2,120
Fjarðabyggð	Fjarðabyggð	Eskifjarðarvöllur	2,100
Kári	Akranes	Akraneshöllin	5,550
Kórdrengir	Reykjavík	Framvöllur	1,200
Njarðvík	Njarðvík	Njarðtaksvöllurinn	1,400
Selfoss	Selfoss	JÁVERK-völlur	750
Víðir	Garður	Nesfisk-völlurinn	2,000
Völsungur	Húsavík	Húsavíkurvöllur	2,000
Þróttur V.	Vogar	Vogabæjarvöllur	1,200
ÍR	Reykjavík	Hertz-völlurinn	1,500

== League table ==
Pos	Team	Pld	W	D	L	GF	GA	GD	Pts	Promotion or relegation
1	Kórdrengir	20	14	4	2	45	13	+32	46	Promotion to 2021 1. deild karla
2	Selfoss	20	14	1	5	36	25	+11	43	Promotion to 2021 1. deild karla
3	Þróttur Vogum	20	12	5	3	39	19	+20	41	
4	Njarðvík	20	12	4	4	39	26	+13	40	
5	Haukar	20	12	0	8	43	28	+15	36	
6	KF	20	8	2	10	33	39	−6	26	
7	Kári	20	7	4	9	33	31	+2	25	
8	Fjarðabyggð	20	7	3	10	30	36	−6	24	
9	ÍR Reykjavík	20	6	1	13	31	39	−8	19	
10	Völsungur	20	5	2	13	25	49	−24	17	
11	Víðir	20	5	1	14	24	52	−28	16	Relegation to 2021 3. deild karla
12	Dalvík/Reynir	20	2	5	13	25	46	−21	11	Relegation to 2021 3. deild karla

Updated to match(es) played on 3 October 2020. Source: Soccerway
Rules for classification: 1) Points; 2) Goal difference; 3) Goals scored; 4) Head-to-head points; 5) Head-to-head goal difference; 6) Head-to-head goals scored; 7) Head-to-head away goals scored; 8) Play-off (only for deciding champion); 9) Draw.

== Results ==
Home \ Away	DAL	FJA	HAU	KF	KÁR	KÓR	NJA	SEL	VÍÐ	VÖL	ÍR	ÞRÓ
Dalvík/Reynir		1–3	2–3	2–4	1–2	1–2	1–1		1–2	3–3	3–2	1–1
Fjarðabyggðar	1–0		2–1	2–4	1–0	1–6		0–1	6–1	0–1	4–1	1–3
Haukar	3–0	2–1		1–2		1–2	1–2	1–2	6–1	2–1	3–1	3–2
KF	3–1		0–3		3–2	0–1	2–4	2–1	0–1	1–2	3–2	1–1
Kári	1–0	5–2	1–2	2–2		0–0	2–3	3–4	5–0		1–0	1–2
Kórdrengir	3–0	1–0	2–1		1–1		3–0	3–1	3–1	4–1	3–1	1–1
Njarðvík	1–1	2–1		2–1	2–0	1–1		1–3	3–0	3–1	2–3	0–1
Selfoss	3–1	0–0	2–1	3–2	1–0	1–0	1–2			2–1	3–1	1–4
Víðir	2–2	5–2	0–2	2–0	3–1	0–3	1–2	1–4		0–2	0–3	
Völsungur		2–2	2–4	2–3	2–3	0–6	0–4	0–1	2–1		1–0	1–2
ÍR Reykjavík	3–4	0–1	2–1	1–0	1–2		1–1	1–2	2–1	5–1		1–3
Þróttur Vogum	3–0	0–0	1–2	4–0	1–1	1–0	2–3	1–0	3–2	3–0		

Updated to match(es) played on 3 October 2020. Source: Soccerway
Legend: Blue = home team win; Yellow = draw; Red = away team win.
