= 2025 2. deild karla =

2. deild karla
- Season: 2025
- Champions: Ægir
- Promoted: Ægir; Grótta
- Relegated: Höttur/Huginn; Víðir

The 2025 2. deild karla (English: Men's Second Division) was the 60th season of third-tier Icelandic football.

== Teams ==
The league consisted of twelve teams; eight teams remaining from the previous season, two teams promoted from the 3. deild karla, and two teams relegated from the 1. deild karla.

The promoted teams were the 2024 3. deild karla champions Kári and runners-up Víðir. They replaced the 2024 2. deild karla bottom two teams KF and Reynir.

The relegated teams were the 2024 1. deild karla bottom two teams Dalvík/Reynir and Grótta. They replaced the 2024 2. deild karla champions Selfoss and runners-up Völsungur.

=== Stadiums and locations ===
Locations of the 2025 2. deild karla teams

Team	Location	Stadium
Ægir	Þorlákshöfn	Þorlákshafnarvöllur
Dalvík/Reynir	Dalvík	Dalvíkurvöllur
Grótta	Seltjarnarnes	Vivaldivöllurinn
Haukar	Hafnarfjörður	Ásvellir
Höttur/Huginn	Egilsstaðir	Vilhjálmsvöllur
Kári	Akranes	Akraneshöllin
KFA	Fjarðabyggð	Fjarðabyggðarhöllin
KFG	Garðabær	Samsung völlurinn
Kormákur/Hvöt	Blönduós/Hvammstangi	Blönduósvöllur / Sjávarborgarvöllurinn
Víðir	Garður	Nesfisk-völlurinn
Víkingur Ólafsvík	Ólafsvík	Ólafsvíkurvöllur
Þróttur Vogum	Vogar	Vogabæjarvöllur

== League table ==
Pos	Team	Pld	W	D	L	GF	GA	GD	Pts	Promotion or relegation
1	Ægir (C, P)	22	14	2	6	60	35	+25	44	Promotion to the 1. deild karla
2	Grótta (P)	22	13	5	4	47	25	+22	44	Promotion to the 1. deild karla
3	Þróttur Vogum	22	13	3	6	32	24	+8	42	
4	Kormákur/Hvöt	22	11	2	9	35	37	−2	35	
5	Dalvík/Reynir	22	10	4	8	38	26	+12	34	
6	KFA	22	9	5	8	53	45	+8	32	
7	Haukar	22	9	4	9	36	40	−4	31	
8	Víkingur Ólafsvík	22	8	4	10	42	40	+2	28	
9	Kári	22	8	0	14	32	55	−23	24	
10	KFG	22	6	5	11	38	52	−14	23	
11	Víðir (R)	22	5	5	12	33	41	−8	20	Relegation to the 3. deild karla
12	Höttur/Huginn (R)	22	4	5	13	27	53	−26	17	Relegation to the 3. deild karla

Source: Soccerway
Rules for classification: 1) Points; 2) Goal difference; 3) Goals scored; 4) Head-to-head points; 5) Head-to-head goal difference; 6) Head-to-head goals scored; 7) Head-to-head away goals scored; 8) Play-off (only for deciding champion); 9) Draw.
(C) Champions; (P) Promoted; (R) Relegated

== Results ==
Each team plays each other twice (22 matches each), once at home and once away.

Home \ Away	ÆGI	DAL	GRÓ	HAU	HÖT	KÀR	KFA	KFG	KOR	VID	VÍK	ÞRÓ
Ægir	—	2–1	1–3	2–0	4–1	6–1	1–2	6–3	3–1	2–0	4–2	1–2
Dalvík/Reynir	0–2	—	0–1	1–1	4–0	2–0	1–1	2–1	0–1	3–5	3–1	3–0
Grótta	3–3	2–0	—	2–0	1–1	1–2	4–2	3–0	1–2	0–2	3–2	2–0
Haukar	0–4	2–2	0–6	—	3–2	4–1	2–1	1–2	2–1	2–1	1–1	0–1
Höttur/Huginn	3–1	0–4	0–2	0–2	—	1–2	1–1	0–0	2–4	1–3	2–1	2–2
Kári	0–4	1–3	1–2	2–1	1–4	—	3–2	4–3	2–3	2–1	1–4	1–2
KFA	4–3	3–4	2–3	3–2	6–1	2–1	—	5–2	8–1	2–0	1–1	0–3
KFG	0–0	1–1	2–5	1–4	5–0	3–1	2–2	—	2–1	2–1	0–2	4–3
Kormákur/Hvöt	3–2	0–1	2–0	2–2	0–3	1–0	5–1	3–1	—	2–0	0–2	0–2
Víðir	2–3	1–0	1–1	2–4	2–2	4–1	1–2	2–2	1–1	—	1–1	0–2
Víkingur Ólafsvík	3–4	0–3	2–2	1–3	3–0	2–4	3–2	4–1	0–1	4–2	—	2–0
Þróttur Vogum	1–2	1–0	0–0	2–0	2–1	0–1	1–1	2–1	2–1	2–1	2–1	—

Source: Soccerway
Legend: Blue = home team win; Yellow = draw; Red = away team win.
