= 2024 2. deild karla =

2. deild karla
- Season: 2024
- Champions: Selfoss
- Promoted: Selfoss; Völsungur
- Relegated: KF; Reynir

The 2024 2. deild karla (English: Men's Second Division) was the 59th season of third-tier Icelandic football. The season began on 4 May and finished on 14 September 2024.

The title winners (Selfoss) and runners-up (Völsungur) were promoted to the 2025 1. deild karla. The bottom two teams (KF and Reynir) were relegated to the 2025 3. deild karla.

== Teams ==
The league consisted of twelve teams; eight teams remaining from the previous season, two teams promoted from the 3. deild karla, and two teams relegated from the 1. deild karla.

The promoted teams were 2023 3. deild karla champions Reynir and runners-up Kormákur/Hvöt (replacing the 2023 2. deild karla relegated teams KV and Sindri). The relegated teams were 2023 1. deild karla bottom two teams Ægir and Selfoss (replacing the 2023 2. deild karla promoted teams Dalvík/Reynir and ÍR).

=== Stadiums and locations ===
Locations of the 2024 2. deild karla teams

Team	Location	Stadium
Haukar	Hafnarfjörður	Ásvellir
Höttur/Huginn	Múlaþing	Vilhjálmsvöllur
KF	Fjallabyggð	Ólafsfjarðarvöllur
KFA	Fjarðabyggð	Fjarðabyggðarhöllin
KFG	Garðabær	Samsung völlurinn
Kormákur/Hvöt	Blönduós/Hvammstangi	Blönduósvöllur / Sjávarborgarvöllurinn
Reynir Sandgerði	Sandgerði	BLUE-Völlurinn
Selfoss	Selfoss	JÁVERK-völlur
Vogum	Vogar	Vogabæjarvöllur
Víkingur Ólafsvík	Ólafsvík	Ólafsvíkurvöllur
Völsungur	Húsavík	PCC völlurinn
Ægir	Þorlákshöfn	Þorlákshafnarvöllur

== League table ==
Pos	Team	Pld	W	D	L	GF	GA	GD	Pts	Promotion or relegation
1	Selfoss (C, P)	22	16	3	3	51	27	+24	51	Promotion to 1. deild karla
2	Völsungur (P)	22	13	4	5	50	29	+21	43	Promotion to 1. deild karla
3	Þróttur Vogum	22	13	3	6	58	33	+25	42	
4	Víkingur Ólafsvík	22	12	6	4	50	30	+20	42	
5	KFA	22	11	2	9	52	46	+6	35	
6	Haukar	22	9	3	10	40	42	−2	30	
7	Höttur/Huginn	22	9	3	10	41	50	−9	30	
8	Ægir	22	6	7	9	29	35	−6	25	
9	KFG	22	6	5	11	38	43	−5	23	
10	Kormákur/Hvöt	22	5	4	13	19	42	−23	19	
11	KF (R)	22	5	3	14	26	50	−24	18	Relegation to 3. deild karla
12	Reynir (R)	22	4	3	15	28	55	−27	15	Relegation to 3. deild karla

Source: Soccerway
Rules for classification: 1) Points; 2) Goal difference; 3) Goals scored; 4) Head-to-head points; 5) Head-to-head goal difference; 6) Head-to-head goals scored; 7) Head-to-head away goals scored; 8) Play-off (only for deciding champion); 9) Draw.
(C) Champions; (P) Promoted; (R) Relegated

== Results ==
Each team plays each other twice (22 matches each), once at home and once away.

Home \ Away	HAU	HÖT	KFJ	KFA	KFG	KOR	REY	SEL	VÍK	VÖL	ÆGI	ÞRÓ
Haukar	—	4–0	5–1	3–1	0–4	5–1	3–2	1–2	0–3	1–3	1–1	3–5
Höttur/Huginn	1–3	—	1–0	3–4	3–2	3–1	1–3	0–1	1–3	0–1	2–0	4–1
KF	2–0	2–3	—	4–0	1–1	0–3	2–1	1–3	4–1	1–1	2–0	0–5
KFA	3–1	8–2	3–0	—	1–2	3–0	7–3	0–1	2–2	3–8	3–3	2–0
KFG	0–1	2–5	2–0	4–1	—	1–1	5–4	1–3	4–4	1–2	1–2	3–3
Kormákur/Hvöt	1–1	1–2	4–1	1–3	1–0	—	1–3	0–2	1–1	1–3	0–1	0–5
Reynir	0–0	0–3	1–1	3–1	1–2	0–1	—	1–4	1–1	0–5	0–3	0–2
Selfoss	1–2	5–0	3–2	2–1	2–2	1–0	2–1	—	2–1	3–4	2–2	6–1
Víkingur Ólafsvík	3–2	4–2	2–0	2–0	4–0	3–1	2–1	2–2	—	3–0	3–1	2–0
Völsungur	3–0	2–2	4–1	0–2	2–1	4–0	4–0	0–1	1–0	—	1–2	2–2
Ægir	2–4	2–2	3–1	0–1	1–0	0–0	1–2	1–2	2–2	0–0	—	2–3
Þróttur Vogum	3–0	1–1	5–0	2–3	1–0	0–1	4–1	4–1	3–2	5–0	3–0	—

Source: Soccerway
Legend: Blue = home team win; Yellow = draw; Red = away team win.
