= 2023 1. deild karla =

1. deild karla
- Season: 2023
- Champions: ÍA
- Promoted: ÍA; Vestri
- Relegated: Ægir; Selfoss

The 2023 1. deild karla (English: Men's First Division) was the 69th season of second-tier Icelandic football. The season began on 5 May 2023 and finished on 16 September 2023.

Twelve teams contested the league. The champions (ÍA) and play-off winners (Vestri) were promoted to the 2024 Besta deild karla. The bottom two teams (Ægir and Selfoss) were relegated to the 2024 2. deild karla.

== Teams ==
=== Team changes ===
Dissolved	Promoted from 2022 2. deild karla	Promoted to 2023 Besta deild karla	Relegated from 2022 Besta deild karla	Relegated to 2023 2. deild karla
Kórdrengir	Ægir; Njarðvík; Þróttur Reykjavík	Fylkir; HK	ÍA; Leiknir Reykjavík	KV; Þróttur Vogum

=== Stadia and locations ===
Team	Location
Ægir	Þorlákshöfn
Afturelding	Mosfellsbær
Fjölnir	Reykjavík
Grindavík	Grindavík
Grótta	Seltjarnarnes
ÍA	Akranes
Leiknir Reykjavík	Reykjavík
Njarðvík	Njarðvík
Selfoss	Selfoss
Vestri	Ísafjörður
Þór	Akureyri
Þróttur Reykjavík	Reykjavík

== League table ==
Pos	Team	Pld	W	D	L	GF	GA	GD	Pts	Promotion, qualification or relegation
1	ÍA (C, P)	22	15	4	3	54	31	+23	49	Promotion to Besta deild karla
2	Afturelding	22	13	4	5	60	33	+27	43	Qualification for 1. deild karla play-offs
3	Fjölnir	22	12	6	4	55	32	+23	42	Qualification for 1. deild karla play-offs
4	Vestri (O, P)	22	11	6	5	37	26	+11	39	Qualification for 1. deild karla play-offs
5	Leiknir Reykjavík	22	11	2	9	47	37	+10	35	Qualification for 1. deild karla play-offs
6	Grindavík	22	8	4	10	27	38	−11	28	
7	Þór	22	8	3	11	27	39	−12	27	
8	Þróttur Reykjavík	22	7	5	10	45	46	−1	26	
9	Grótta	22	6	8	8	34	37	−3	26	
10	Njarðvík	22	6	5	11	36	47	−11	23	
11	Selfoss (R)	22	7	2	13	37	49	−12	23	Relegation to 2. deild karla
12	Ægir (R)	22	2	3	17	23	67	−44	9	Relegation to 2. deild karla

Source: ksí.is
Rules for classification: 1) Points; 2) Goal difference; 3) Goals scored; 4) Head-to-head points; 5) Head-to-head goal difference; 6) Head-to-head goals scored; 7) Head-to-head away goals scored; 8) Play-off (only for deciding champion); 9) Draw.
(C) Champions; (O) Play-off winners; (P) Promoted; (R) Relegated

=== Results ===
Each team played each other twice (22 matches each), once at home and once away.

Home \ Away	ÆGI	AFT	FJÓ	GRI	GRÓ	ÍA	LER	NJA	SEL	VES	ÞÓR	ÞRÓ
Ægir	—	1–4	0–1	1–3	2–2	0–1	0–5	1–0	1–3	0–5	2–3	2–2
Afturelding	5–0	—	4–3	1–2	1–1	2–5	0–2	7–2	9–0	3–1	1–0	1–0
Fjölnir	5–1	4–2	—	5–1	2–2	0–1	4–1	4–0	2–4	1–1	6–0	3–3
Grindavík	7–2	0–3	0–1	—	0–0	0–2	1–0	1–0	2–1	1–1	1–1	1–2
Grótta	2–1	2–3	3–3	2–0	—	1–3	5–1	1–1	1–0	2–2	1–0	2–2
ÍA	4–0	1–1	1–2	0–2	4–1	—	1–5	2–1	1–0	1–1	4–0	6–3
Leiknir Reykjavík	3–2	2–2	1–2	2–2	2–1	2–3	—	3–0	2–3	1–2	1–0	3–2
Njarðvík	2–2	1–2	1–1	4–1	1–3	2–4	2–4	—	1–1	2–0	2–2	3–1
Selfoss	3–1	1–3	1–2	2–0	1–0	3–4	2–4	2–3	—	1–2	2–2	2–1
Vestri	1–2	2–2	3–1	0–2	3–0	2–2	1–0	2–0	2–1	—	1–0	2–1
Þór	3–1	1–3	0–1	3–0	3–1	2–3	1–0	0–3	2–1	2–1	—	2–1
Þróttur Reykjavík	3–1	2–1	2–2	5–0	2–1	1–1	1–3	3–5	4–3	1–2	3–0	—

Source: ksí.is
Legend: Blue = home team win; Yellow = draw; Red = away team win.

== 1. deild karla play-offs ==
Teams placed 2nd-5th qualified for the play-offs, with the winners earning promotion to the 2024 Besta deild karla.

=== Semi-finals ===
==== First leg ====
20 September 2023	Leiknir Reykjavík (5th)	1–2	Afturelding (2nd)	Leiknisvöllur, Reykjavík
17:30 BST	Sowe 85'		Christiansen 13'; Marteinsson 76'

20 September 2023	Vestri (4th)	1–0	Fjölnir (3rd)	Olísvöllurinn, Ísafjörður
17:30 BST	Songani 29'

==== Second leg ====
24 September 2023	Afturelding (2nd)	3–0 (5–1 agg.)	Leiknir Reykjavík (5th)	Varmárvollur, Mosfellsbær
15:00 BST	Ragnarsson 17'; Jensen 19'; Braz 25'

24 September 2023	Fjölnir (3rd)	1–1 (1–2 agg.)	Vestri (4th)	Fjölnisvöllur, Reykjavík
15:00 BST	Guðmundsson 49'		Tufegdžić 38'

=== Final ===
30 September 2023	Vestri (4th)	1–0 (a.e.t.)	Afturelding (2nd)	Laugardalsvöllur, Reykjavík
17:00 BST	Hernández 103'
