= 2024 1. deild karla =

1. deild karla
- Season: 2024
- Dates: 1 May 2024 – 27 September 2024
- Champions: ÍBV
- Promoted: Afturelding; ÍBV
- Relegated: Dalvík/Reynir; Grótta
- Matches: 137
- Goals: 441 (3.22 per match)
- Top goalscorer: Oliver Heiðarsson (14 goals)
- Biggest home win: ÍBV 6-0 Keflavík (7 September 2024)
- Biggest away win: Dalvík/Reynir 1-7 Keflavík (24 August 2024)
- Highest scoring: Dalvík/Reynir 1-7 Keflavík (24 August 2024)
- All statistics correct as of 27 September 2024.

The 2024 1. deild karla (English: Men's First Division) was the 70th season of second-tier Icelandic football. The season began on 1 May 2024 and finished on 14 September 2024.

== Teams ==
The league consisted of twelve teams; eight teams remaining from the previous season, two teams promoted from the 2. deild karla, and two teams relegated from the Besta deild karla.

The promoted teams were 2023 2. deild karla champions Dalvík/Reynir and runners-up ÍR (replacing the 2023 1. deild karla relegated teams Ægir and Selfoss). The relegated teams were 2023 Besta deild karla bottom two teams ÍBV and Keflavík (replacing the 2023 1. deild karla promoted teams ÍA and Vestri).

=== Stadia and locations ===
Locations of the 2024 1. deild karla teams

Team	Location
Afturelding	Mosfellsbær
Dalvík/Reynir	Dalvík
Fjölnir	Reykjavík
Grindavík	Grindavík
Grótta	Seltjarnarnes
Keflavík	Keflavík
Leiknir Reykjavík	Reykjavík
Njarðvík	Njarðvík
Þróttur Reykjavík	Reykjavík
Þór	Akureyri
ÍBV	Vestmannaeyjar
ÍR	Reykjavík

== League table ==
Pos	Team	Pld	W	D	L	GF	GA	GD	Pts	Promotion, qualification or relegation
1	ÍBV (C, P)	22	11	6	5	50	27	+23	39	Promotion to Besta deild karla
2	Keflavík	22	10	8	4	37	24	+13	38	Qualification for the 1. deild karla play-offs
3	Fjölnir	22	10	7	5	34	28	+6	37	Qualification for the 1. deild karla play-offs
4	Afturelding (O, P)	22	11	3	8	39	36	+3	36	Qualification for the 1. deild karla play-offs
5	ÍR	22	9	8	5	30	28	+2	35	Qualification for the 1. deild karla play-offs
6	Njarðvík	22	8	9	5	34	29	+5	33	
7	Þróttur Reykjavík	22	8	6	8	37	31	+6	30	
8	Leiknir Reykjavík	22	8	4	10	33	34	−1	28	
9	Grindavík	22	6	8	8	40	46	−6	26	
10	Þór	22	6	8	8	32	38	−6	26	
11	Grótta (R)	22	4	4	14	31	50	−19	16	Relegation to 2. deild karla
12	Dalvík/Reynir (R)	22	2	7	13	23	49	−26	13	Relegation to 2. deild karla

Source: ksí.is
Rules for classification: 1) Points; 2) Goal difference; 3) Goals scored; 4) Head-to-head points; 5) Head-to-head goal difference; 6) Head-to-head goals scored; 7) Head-to-head away goals scored; 8) Play-off (only for deciding champion); 9) Draw.
(C) Champions; (O) Play-off winners; (P) Promoted; (R) Relegated

== Results ==
Each team plays each other twice (22 matches each), once at home and once away.

Home \ Away	AFT	DAL	FJÖ	GRI	GRÓ	KEF	LER	NJA	ÍBV	ÍR	ÞRÓ	ÞÓR
Afturelding	—	4–3	0–1	1–1	1–1	1–3	1–1	4–1	0–3	3–0	1–0	0–3
Dalvík/Reynir	1–3	—	0–0	1–7	2–2	0–0	0–1	0–0	3–1	1–1	2–5	1–3
Fjölnir	2–0	1–1	—	5–1	5–2	0–0	1–0	4–2	1–5	1–2	3–1	1–0
Grindavík	0–3	3–1	2–3	—	2–2	2–2	3–3	2–2	3–1	1–1	2–2	3–0
Grótta	1–4	2–3	2–1	3–1	—	1–0	4–3	2–3	0–3	1–3	1–1	1–2
Keflavík	3–0	3–1	4–0	2–1	2–1	—	5–0	1–1	3–2	1–2	1–1	3–2
Leiknir Reykjavík	0–1	2–1	0–1	2–3	3–1	0–0	—	1–2	1–1	1–0	3–1	5–1
Njarðvík	2–5	3–0	0–0	0–1	1–0	0–0	3–2	—	0–0	3–0	1–1	5–1
ÍBV	2–3	1–0	2–2	6–0	2–1	5–0	1–0	2–1	—	2–2	4–2	1–1
ÍR	3–0	1–1	3–1	3–0	2–1	0–1	1–0	1–1	2–2	—	1–0	1–1
Þróttur Reykjavík	1–2	4–1	0–0	1–0	3–1	3–2	2–3	0–1	2–1	5–0	—	1–1
Þór	4–2	2–0	1–1	2–2	3–1	1–1	1–2	2–2	0–3	1–1	0–1	—

Source: ksí.is
Legend: Blue = home team win; Yellow = draw; Red = away team win.

== 1. deild karla play-offs ==
Teams placed 2nd-5th qualified for the 1. deild karla play-offs, with the winners earning promotion to the 2025 Besta deild karla.

=== Semi-finals ===
==== First leg ====
18 September 2024	ÍR (5th)	1–4	Keflavík (2nd)	Reykjavík
17:45 BST				Stadium: Gimli-völlurinn

19 September 2024	Afturelding (4th)	3–1	Fjölnir (3rd)	Mosfellsbær
20:15 BST				Stadium: Varmárvollur

==== Second leg ====
22 September 2024	Keflavík (2nd)	2–3 (6–4 agg.)	ÍR (5th)	Keflavík
15:00 BST				Stadium: Keflavíkurvöllur

23 September 2024	Fjölnir (3rd)	0–0 (1–3 agg.)	Afturelding (4th)	Reykjavík
16:45 BST				Stadium: Fjölnisvöllur

=== Final ===
28 September 2024	Keflavík (2nd)	0–1	Afturelding (4th)	Reykjavík
17:00 BST				Stadium: Laugardalsvöllur
