= 2023 2. deild karla =

2. deild karla
- Season: 2023
- Champions: Dalvík/Reynir
- Promoted: Dalvík/Reynir; ÍR
- Relegated: KV; Sindri

The 2023 2. deild karla (English: Men's Second Division) was the 58th season of third-tier Icelandic football. The season began on 5 May 2023 and finished on 16 September 2023.

Twelve teams contested the league. The title winners (Dalvík/Reynir) and runners-up (ÍR) were promoted to the 2024 1. deild karla. The bottom two teams (KV and Sindri) were relegated to the 2024 3. deild karla.

== Teams ==
=== Team changes ===
Promoted from 2022 3. deild karla	Promoted to 2023 1. deild karla	Relegated from 2022 1. deild karla	Relegated to 2023 3. deild karla
Dalvík/Reynir; KFG; Sindri	Ægir; Njarðvík; Þróttur Reykjavík	KV; Þróttur Vogum	Magni; Reynir

=== Stadia and locations ===
Team	Location	Stadium
Dalvík/Reynir	Dalvík	Dalvíkurvöllur
Haukar	Hafnarfjörður	Ásvellir
Höttur/Huginn	Múlaþing	Vilhjálmsvöllur
ÍR	Reykjavík (Breiðholt)	ÍR-völlur
KF	Fjallabyggð	Ólafsfjarðarvöllur
KFA	Fjarðabyggð	Fjarðabyggðarhöllin
KFG	Garðabær	Samsung völlurinn
KV	Reykjavík (Vesturbær)	KV Park
Sindri	Höfn	Sindravellir
Víkingur Ólafsvík	Ólafsvík	Ólafsvíkurvöllur
Völsungur	Húsavík	PCC völlurinn
Þróttur Vogum	Vogar	Vogaídýfuvöllur

== League table ==
Pos	Team	Pld	W	D	L	GF	GA	GD	Pts	Promotion or relegation
1	Dalvík/Reynir (C, P)	22	13	6	3	45	23	+22	45	Promotion to 1. deild karla
2	ÍR (P)	22	13	2	7	55	28	+27	41	Promotion to 1. deild karla
3	KFA	22	11	8	3	45	24	+21	41	
4	Þróttur Vogum	22	11	5	6	42	30	+12	38	
5	Víkingur Ólafsvík	22	11	5	6	42	34	+8	38	
6	Höttur/Huginn	22	10	3	9	34	38	−4	33	
7	Haukar	22	9	4	9	36	36	0	31	
8	KFG	22	9	3	10	41	40	+1	30	
9	Völsungur	22	8	1	13	33	38	−5	25	
10	KF	22	8	1	13	36	49	−13	25	
11	Sindri (R)	22	4	5	13	25	53	−28	17	Relegation to 3. deild karla
12	KV (R)	22	2	3	17	18	59	−41	9	Relegation to 3. deild karla

Source: ksí.is
Rules for classification: 1) Points; 2) Goal difference; 3) Goals scored; 4) Head-to-head points; 5) Head-to-head goal difference; 6) Head-to-head goals scored; 7) Head-to-head away goals scored; 8) Play-off (only for deciding champion); 9) Draw.
(C) Champions; (P) Promoted; (R) Relegated

=== Results ===
Each team played each other twice (22 matches each), once at home and once away.

Home \ Away	DAL	HAU	HÓT	ÍR	KF	KFA	KFG	KV	SIN	VÍK	VÓL	ÞRÓ
Dalvík/Reynir	—	1–1	4–2	3–1	1–2	2–2	1–0	5–1	2–1	3–0	3–2	3–1
Haukar	1–1	—	3–1	1–3	3–1	0–2	1–3	3–2	1–1	0–3	2–0	4–1
Höttur/Huginn	1–3	4–2	—	0–5	2–2	2–1	4–1	1–0	1–0	0–0	2–1	3–1
ÍR	0–0	1–2	2–0	—	3–1	4–2	1–2	5–1	5–1	7–0	3–0	1–3
KF	0–2	2–1	3–1	1–4	—	1–3	3–2	0–1	2–3	1–2	3–2	3–2
KFA	1–0	3–2	1–1	2–1	6–1	—	2–1	2–0	5–1	3–1	1–2	1–1
KFG	1–2	1–3	2–1	3–5	2–0	0–0	—	5–2	3–0	1–4	3–1	2–4
KV	1–4	1–1	3–4	0–2	0–4	0–4	1–3	—	2–1	0–0	1–3	0–2
Sindri	0–0	1–2	0–2	1–1	3–1	2–2	1–0	3–1	—	3–3	0–1	1–3
Víkingur Ólafsvík	3–1	2–0	3–0	0–1	3–2	0–0	2–2	4–1	7–1	—	3–2	2–1
Völsungur	0–2	0–2	1–0	2–0	2–3	1–1	1–3	3–0	5–1	1–0	—	1–2
Þróttur Vogum	2–2	2–1	0–2	3–0	1–0	1–1	1–1	0–0	4–0	4–0	3–2	—

Source: ksí.is
Legend: Blue = home team win; Yellow = draw; Red = away team win.
