= 2023 3. deild karla =

3. deild karla
- Season: 2023
- Champions: Reynir
- Promoted: Hvöt Blönduós; Reynir
- Relegated: KFS; Ýmir

The 2023 3. deild karla (English: Men's Third Division) was the 69th season of fourth-tier Icelandic football. The season began on 4 May 2023 and finished on 16 September 2023.

Twelve teams contested the league. The title winners (Reynir) and runners-up (Hvöt Blönduós) were promoted to the 2024 2. deild karla. The bottom two teams (KFS and Ymir) were relegated to the 2024 4. deild karla.

== Teams ==
=== Team changes ===
Promoted from 2022 4. deild karla	Promoted to 2023 2. deild karla	Relegated from 2022 2. deild karla	Relegated to 2023 4. deild karla
Arbær; Hvíti Riddarinn; Ýmir	Dalvík/Reynir; KFG; Sindri	Magni; Reynir	KH; Vængir Júpiters

=== Stadia and locations ===
Team	Location	Stadium
Arbær	Reykjavík (Árbær)	Fylkisvöllur
Augnablik	Kópavogur	Kópavogsvöllur
Ellíði	Reykjavík (Árbær)	Würth völlurinn
Hvíti Riddarinn	Mosfellsbær	Varmárvöllur
Hvöt Blönduós	Blönduós	Blönduósvöllur
ÍH	Hafnarfjörður	Skessan
Kári	Akranes	Akraneshöllin
KFS	Vestmannaeyjar	Týsvöllur
Magni	Grenivík	Grenivíkurvöllur
Reynir	Sandgerði	Brons-völlurinn
Víðir	Garður	Nesfisk-völlurinn
Ýmir	Kópavogur	Kórinn

== League table ==
Pos	Team	Pld	W	D	L	GF	GA	GD	Pts	Promotion or relegation
1	Reynir (C, P)	22	15	2	5	61	30	+31	47	Promotion to 2. deild karla
2	Hvöt Blönduós (P)	22	14	3	5	49	27	+22	45	Promotion to 2. deild karla
3	Arbær	22	13	3	6	53	37	+16	42	
4	Víðir	22	13	2	7	40	29	+11	41	
5	Kári	22	9	5	8	38	36	+2	32	
6	Augnablik	22	9	4	9	34	33	+1	31	
7	Magni	22	7	7	8	42	39	+3	28	
8	Ellíði	22	8	3	11	44	49	−5	27	
9	Hvíti Riddarinn	22	7	2	13	30	47	−17	23	
10	ÍH	22	5	6	11	44	58	−14	21	
11	KFS (R)	22	6	3	13	25	48	−23	21	Relegation to 4. deild karla
12	Ýmir (R)	22	4	4	14	34	61	−27	16	Relegation to 4. deild karla

Source: ksí.is
Rules for classification: 1) Points; 2) Goal difference; 3) Goals scored; 4) Head-to-head points; 5) Head-to-head goal difference; 6) Head-to-head goals scored; 7) Head-to-head away goals scored; 8) Play-off (only for deciding champion); 9) Draw.
(C) Champions; (P) Promoted; (R) Relegated

=== Results ===
Each team played each other twice (22 matches each), once at home and once away.

Home \ Away	ARB	AUG	ELL	HVÍ	HVÓ	ÍH	KÁR	KFS	MAG	REY	VÍÓ	ÝMI
Arbær	—	1–1	3–2	4–0	1–3	7–1	2–1	2–1	3–3	1–4	3–2	3–1
Augnablik	1–0	—	4–1	4–2	2–1	1–2	1–2	0–1	4–1	2–1	1–0	2–3
Ellíði	2–3	2–2	—	2–4	1–2	3–3	1–3	2–2	1–4	2–1	2–1	6–2
Hvíti Riddarinn	1–2	1–2	1–2	—	1–0	1–5	2–1	1–0	3–1	0–4	1–2	2–1
Hvöt Blönduós	3–2	3–0	1–3	2–0	—	5–0	4–2	3–1	2–1	0–0	3–2	7–0
ÍH	2–2	2–2	3–2	3–2	1–2	—	1–1	5–0	0–3	1–2	2–3	4–4
Kári	1–0	1–2	2–3	2–1	1–1	4–1	—	1–1	2–0	4–3	2–3	2–1
KFS	0–5	3–1	0–3	0–2	1–2	2–0	1–0	—	2–2	0–1	0–3	4–0
Magni	3–0	1–0	1–2	2–2	2–2	2–2	3–3	6–2	—	1–3	0–1	3–2
Reynir	2–3	2–1	4–1	4–1	3–2	4–2	4–1	6–1	2–1	—	1–1	5–1
Víðir	2–4	2–0	1–0	3–1	3–0	2–1	0–1	2–1	1–1	1–0	—	4–1
Ýmir	1–2	1–1	2–1	1–1	0–1	4–3	1–1	1–2	0–1	3–5	4–1	—

Source: ksí.is
Legend: Blue = home team win; Yellow = draw; Red = away team win.
