= 2017 4. deild karla =

4. deild karla
- Season: 2017
- Champions: KH
- Promoted: KH; Augnablik
- Matches played: 254
- Goals scored: 1,376 (5.42 per match)
- Top goalscorer: Samúel Arnar Kjartansson (44 goals)
- Biggest home win: Ýmir 19–0 Kóngarnir (17 August 2017)
- Biggest away win: Kóngarnir 0–14 Ýmir (26 June 2017)
- Highest scoring: Ýmir 19–0 Kóngarnir (17 August 2017)
- Longest winning run: 8 matches Álftanes
- Longest unbeaten run: 12 matches Ýmir
- Longest winless run: 14 matches Snæfell/UDN; Kóngarnir
- Longest losing run: 14 matches Snæfell/UDN
- All statistics correct as of 16 September 2017.

The 2017 4. deild karla season was the 5th since its establishment. The first match of the season was played on 19 May and the season concluded on 16 September with the promotion play-off final. KH and Augnablik were promoted to 2018 3. deild karla

== Overview before the season ==
33 teams are participating in the league, including two relegated from the 2016 3. deild karla.

Relegated from 2016 3. deild karla

- KFR
- KFS

New teams that didn't participate during 2016 4. deild karla

- Álafoss
- Drangey
- Elliði
- Hrunamenn
- Kórdrengir
- SR
- Úlfarnir

== Group A ==
Locations of the 2017 4. deild karla - Group A teams

=== Stadium and locations ===
Team	Home city	Stadium
GG	Grindavík	Grindavíkurvöllur
Hamar	Hveragerði	Grýluvöllur
Hvíti riddarinn	Mosfellsbær	Tungubakkavöllur
Hörður Í.	Ísafjörður	Torfnesvöllur
Ísbjörninn	Kópavogur	Kórinn
Kórdrengir	Reykjavík	Framvöllur
Kría	Seltjarnarnes	Vivaldi-völlurinn
Snæfell/UDN	Stykkishólmur/Búðardalur	Stykkishólmsvöllur

=== League table ===
Pos	Team	Pld	W	D	L	GF	GA	GD	Pts	Qualification or relegation
1	Kórdrengir	14	11	1	2	41	19	+22	34	Qualification to playoffs
2	Hvíti riddarinn	14	10	1	3	67	17	+50	31	Qualification to playoffs
3	Hamar	14	9	1	4	56	21	+35	28	
4	Kría	14	8	0	6	56	29	+27	24	
5	Hörður Í.	14	7	3	4	64	38	+26	24	
6	GG	14	5	2	7	37	33	+4	17	
7	Ísbjörninn	14	2	0	12	18	59	−41	6	
8	Snæfell/UDN	14	0	0	14	12	135	−123	0	

Updated to match(es) played on 26 August 2017. Source: ksí.is
Rules for classification: 1) points won; 2) total goal difference; 3) total goals scored; 4) points in head-to-head matches; 5) goal difference in hth matches; 6) goals scored in hth matches; 7) away goals in hth matches; 8) play-off (only for deciding the promotion play-offs participation); 9) draw.

=== Results ===
Home \ Away	GG	Hamar	Hvíti riddarinn	Hörður Í.	Ísbjörninn	Kórdrengir	Kría	Snæfell/UDN
GG	—	2–5	0–4	2–2	2–1	1–2	2–1	11–2
Hamar	2–1	—	1–2	2–2	4–1	3–1	2–4	14–0
Hvíti riddarinn	2–2	1–0	—	7–3	1–0	1–2	2–1	18–0
Hörður Í.	4–2	3–6	1–2	—	12–0	2–2	2–1	14–1
Ísbjörninn	1–2	1–6	0–9	4–8	—	1–3	1–2	2–0
Kórdrengir	3–1	1–0	2–1	3–2	2–1	—	2–1	6–0
Kría	3–2	1–2	5–3	4–5	7–1	4–1	—	9–1
Snæfell/UDN	1–7	1–9	0–13	2–4	1–4	1–11	2–13	—

Updated to match(es) played on 26 August 2017. Source: ksi.is
Legend: Blue = home team win; Yellow = draw; Red = away team win.

== Top goalscorers ==
As of matches played on 26 August 2017

Rank	Player	Club	Goals
1	(Wales) Jordan Follows	Hamar	12
1	(Iceland) Eiríkur Þór Bjarkason	Hvíti riddarinn	12
3	(England) Sam Malsom	Hamar	10
3	(Iceland) Hrannar Einarsson	Hamar	10
5	(Iceland) Axel Fannar Sveinsson	Kría	9
6	(Iceland) Magnús Ingi Einarsson	Hörður Í.	8
6	(Iceland) Pétur Theódór Árnason	Kría	8
6	(Iceland) Viðar Þór Sigurðsson	Kría	8
6	(Iceland) Tómas Ingvi Hassing	Hamar	8
6	(Iceland) Felix Rein Grétarsson	Hörður Í.	8

== Group B ==
Locations of the 2017 4. deild karla - Group B teams

=== Stadium and locations ===
Team	Home city	Stadium
Afríka	Reykjavík	Leiknisvöllur
Augnablik	Kópavogur	Fagrilundur
Elliði	Reykjavík	Fylkisvöllur
ÍH	Hafnarfjörður	Kaplakrikavöllur
KFR	Hvolsvöllur	SS-völlurinn
KFS	Vestmannaeyjar	Týsvöllur
SR	Reykjavík	Þróttarvöllur
Stokkseyri	Stokkseyri	Stokkseyrarvöllur
Vatnaliljur	Kópavogur	Fagrilundur

=== League table ===
Pos	Team	Pld	W	D	L	GF	GA	GD	Pts	Qualification or relegation
1	Augnablik (P)	16	12	2	2	62	23	+39	38	Qualification to playoffs
2	ÍH	16	12	1	3	56	26	+30	37	Qualification to playoffs
3	KFS	16	11	0	5	52	24	+28	33	
4	KFR	16	8	2	6	35	25	+10	26	
5	Vatnaliljur	16	7	3	6	30	34	−4	24	
6	Elliði	16	5	2	9	34	43	−9	17	
7	SR	16	5	1	10	40	44	−4	16	
8	Stokkseyri	16	4	1	11	27	60	−33	13	
9	Afríka	16	2	0	14	17	74	−57	6	

Updated to match(es) played on 26 August 2017. Source: ksí.is
Rules for classification: 1) points won; 2) total goal difference; 3) total goals scored; 4) points in head-to-head matches; 5) goal difference in hth matches; 6) goals scored in hth matches; 7) away goals in hth matches; 8) play-off (only for deciding the promotion play-offs participation); 9) draw.
(P) Promoted

=== Results ===
Home \ Away	Afríka	Augnablik	Elliði	ÍH	KFR	KFS	SR	Stokkseyri	Vatnaliljur
Afríka	—	1–6	1–5	0–5	0–3	0–5	3–1	1–2	1–3
Augnablik	4–1	—	2–3	5–1	1–1	1–0	4–3	5–1	6–2
Elliði	1–2	2–7	—	1–4	3–2	1–4	1–2	8–0	4–2
ÍH	9–0	2–2	3–2	—	3–4	2–1	3–2	2–1	2–1
KFR	7–1	1–3	6–1	0–2	—	0–2	2–0	1–0	1–1
KFS	7–1	2–1	1–0	3–2	2–1	—	6–4	6–1	2–3
SR	10–4	2–7	1–1	2–3	1–2	1–0	—	5–0	3–2
Stokkseyri	4–0	0–5	5–0	2–9	3–4	2–8	4–2	—	1–1
Vatnaliljur	2–1	1–3	1–1	0–4	2–0	4–3	2–1	3–1	—

Updated to match(es) played on 26 August 2017. Source: ksi.is
Legend: Blue = home team win; Yellow = draw; Red = away team win.

== Top goalscorers ==
As of matches played on 26 August 2017.

Rank	Player	Club	Goals
1	(Iceland) Hjörtur Júlíus Hjartarson	Augnablik	18
2	(Iceland) Andri Magnússon	ÍH	13
3	(Iceland) Magnús Stefánsson	ÍH	10
4	(Iceland) Guðmundur Pétursson	Augnablik	9
5	(Iceland) Ásgeir Elíasson	KFS	8
6	(Iceland) Dagur Harðarson	SR	7
6	(Iceland) Hreinn Bergs	Augnablik	7
6	(Iceland) Guðmundur Gunnar Guðmundsson	KFR	7
6	(Iceland) Hjörvar Sigurðsson	KFR	7
10	(Iceland) Breki Ómarsson	KFS	6
10	(Iceland) Anton Bjarnason	KFS	6
10	(Iceland) Hrafn Ingi Jóhannsson	SR	6
10	(Iceland) Erik Ragnar Gíslason Ruiz	KFS	6

== Group C ==
Locations of the 2017 4. deild karla - Group C teams

=== Stadium and locations ===
Team	Home city	Stadium
Árborg	Selfoss	JÁVERK-völlurinn
Hrunamenn	Flúðir	Flúðavöllur
Kormákur/Hvöt	Hvammstangi/Blönduós	Hvammstangavöllur
Kóngarnir	Reykjavík	Þróttarvöllur
Léttir	Reykjavík	Hertz völlurinn
Skallagrímur	Borgarnes	Skallagrímsvöllur
Úlfarnir	Reykjavík	Framvöllur - Úlfarsárdal
Ýmir	Kópavogur	Versalavöllur

=== League table ===
Pos	Team	Pld	W	D	L	GF	GA	GD	Pts	Qualification or relegation
1	Ýmir	14	11	2	1	89	14	+75	35	Qualification to playoffs
2	Árborg	14	9	3	2	44	17	+27	30	Qualification to playoffs
3	Léttir	14	9	2	3	58	20	+38	29	
4	Skallagrímur	14	9	2	3	58	24	+34	29	
5	Kormákur/Hvöt	14	7	1	6	38	28	+10	22	
6	Úlfarnir	14	3	1	10	44	57	−13	10	
7	Hrunamenn	14	1	2	11	16	83	−67	5	
8	Kóngarnir	14	0	1	13	12	116	−104	1	

Updated to match(es) played on 26 August 2017. Source: ksí.is
Rules for classification: 1) points won; 2) total goal difference; 3) total goals scored; 4) points in head-to-head matches; 5) goal difference in hth matches; 6) goals scored in hth matches; 7) away goals in hth matches; 8) play-off (only for deciding the promotion play-offs participation); 9) draw.

=== Results ===
Home \ Away	Árborg	Hrunamenn	Kormákur/Hvöt	Kóngarnir	Léttir	Skallagrímur	Úlfarnir	Ýmir
Árborg	—	2–1	2–1	8–0	2–2	1–1	4–1	1–3
Hrunamenn	0–5	—	0–4	4–0	0–5	3–9	1–1	1–12
Kormákur/Hvöt	2–4	8–0	—	5–0	2–1	0–4	4–2	2–2
Kóngarnir	0–5	3–3	1–5	—	1–14	2–12	3–7	0–14
Léttir	2–2	4–1	3–1	9–1	—	3–0	2–1	0–1
Skallagrímur	1–4	5–0	5–0	6–0	2–0	—	6–2	1–4
Úlfarnir	0–4	11–1	2–3	5–1	5–10	4–5	—	0–8
Ýmir	3–0	14–1	2–1	19–0	1–3	1–1	5–3	—

Updated to match(es) played on 26 August 2017. Source: ksi.is
Legend: Blue = home team win; Yellow = draw; Red = away team win.

== Top goalscorers ==
As of matches played on 26 August 2017.

Rank	Player	Club	Goals
1	(Iceland) Samúel Arnar Kjartansson	Ýmir	44
2	(Iceland) Viktor Ingi Jakobsson	Skallagrímur	16
3	(Iceland) Steinar Haraldsson	Úlfarnir	14
4	(Iceland) Andri Magnús Eysteinsson	Léttir	11
5	(Iceland) Daníel Ingi Birgisson	Árborg	10
6	(Iceland) Ólafur Már Sigurðsson	Úlfarnir	9
6	(Iceland) Guðni Albert Kristjánsson	Skallagrímur	9
6	(Iceland) Birgir Magnússon	Ýmir	9
6	(Iceland) Sölvi Víðisson	Ýmir	9
10	(Iceland) Ingvi Rafn Ingvarsson	Kormákur/Hvöt	8
10	(Iceland) Hrannar Karlsson	Léttir	8

== Group D ==
Locations of the 2017 4. deild karla - Group D teams

=== Stadium and locations ===
Team	Home city	Stadium
Álafoss	Mosfellsbær	Tungubakkavöllur
Álftanes	Álftanes	Bessastaðavöllur
Drangey	Sauðárkrókur	Sauðárkróksvöllur
Geisli A.	Aðaldalur	Geislavöllur
KB	Reykjavík	Leiknisvöllur
KH	Reykjavík	Valsvöllur
Mídas	Reykjavík	Víkingsvöllur
Stál-úlfur	Kópavogur	Kórinn

=== League table ===
Pos	Team	Pld	W	D	L	GF	GA	GD	Pts	Qualification or relegation
1	Álftanes	14	12	1	1	57	11	+46	37	Qualification to playoffs
2	KH (C, P)	14	9	3	2	66	16	+50	30	Qualification to playoffs
3	Mídas	14	8	3	3	42	23	+19	27	
4	Stál-úlfur	14	7	4	3	35	18	+17	25	
5	Drangey	14	4	3	7	19	42	−23	15	
6	Geisli A.	14	3	2	9	14	52	−38	11	
7	KB	14	3	1	10	18	49	−31	10	
8	Álafoss	14	1	1	12	11	51	−40	4	

Updated to match(es) played on 26 August 2017. Source: ksí.is
Rules for classification: 1) points won; 2) total goal difference; 3) total goals scored; 4) points in head-to-head matches; 5) goal difference in hth matches; 6) goals scored in hth matches; 7) away goals in hth matches; 8) play-off (only for deciding the promotion play-offs participation); 9) draw.
(C) Champions; (P) Promoted

=== Results ===
Home \ Away	Álafoss	Álftanes	Drangey	Geisli A.	KB	KH	Mídas	Stál-úlfur
Álafoss	—	1–3	1–2	0–3	2–0	0–7	1–6	0–0
Álftanes	10–0	—	6–0	11–0	2–1	3–3	2–1	2–1
Drangey	3–2	1–3	—	3–2	3–2	0–5	1–5	2–2
Geisli A.	1–0	0–3	1–1	—	1–3	0–6	1–1	1–2
KB	3–0	0–7	2–2	1–3	—	1–4	4–1	0–6
KH	6–0	0–2	6–0	10–0	9–1	—	2–2	4–4
Mídas	3–2	1–3	3–1	8–1	3–0	3–2	—	4–2
Stál-úlfur	4–2	2–0	2–0	3–0	6–0	0–2	1–1	—

Updated to match(es) played on 26 August 2017. Source: ksi.is
Legend: Blue = home team win; Yellow = draw; Red = away team win.

== Top goalscorers ==
As of matches played on 26 August 2017

Rank	Player	Club	Goals
1	(Iceland) Alexander Lúðvígsson	KH	18
2	(Lithuania) Ramunas Macezinskas	Stál-úlfur	12
2	(Iceland) Sveinn Ingi Einarsson	KH	12
2	(Iceland) Sigurjón Björn Grétarsson	Mídas	12
5	(Iceland) Andri Janusson	Álftanes	10
6	(Iceland) Hreiðar Ingi Ársælsson	Álftanes	7
7	(Iceland) Bragi Þór Kristinsson	Álftanes	6
7	(Iceland) Ríkarður Már Ellertsson	Mídas	6
7	(Serbia) Danijel Smiljkovic	KH	6
10	(Iceland) Finn Axel Hansen	Álftanes	5
10	(Iceland) Guðni Þór Einarsson	Drangey	5
10	(Iceland) Vilhjálmur Herrera Þórisson	KH	5
10	(Iceland) Kristófer Örn Kristjánsson	Álftanes	5
10	(Iceland) Guðbjörn Alexander Sæmundsson	Álftanes	5

== Promotion playoffs ==
The top two teams from each of the four groups qualify for the promotion playoffs. There are three rounds of matches, quarter-finals, semi-finals and the final. There's also a play-off to decide third and fourth place. The quarter-finals and semi-finals are two-legged knockout stages, i.e. winners are decided over two legs. Tie-breakers for the knockout matches over two legs are: 1) aggregate score from the two legs, 2) away goals, 3) extra time, 4) penalties. The two semi-final winners, and the finalists, will gain promotion to 2018 3. deild karla. The final winner will become champion of 4. deild karla.

Quarter-finals
Árborg	0	3	3
Augnablik	2	2	4
Hvíti riddarinn	2	0	2
Álftanes	0	4	4
ÍH	2	0	2
Kórdrengir	1	2	3
KH	6	2	8
Ýmir	0	2	2

Semi-finals
Augnablik	2	3	5
Álftanes	2	0	2
Kórdrengir	0	1	1
KH	1	1	2

Final
Augnablik	0
KH	3
Third place
Álftanes	9
Kórdrengir	1

=== Quarter-finals ===
First leg

2 September 2017
13:00

Árborg	0-2	Augnablik
	ksi.is	Ellert Hreinsson 49'; Hjörvar Hermannsson 51'

JÁVERK-völlurinn, Selfoss
Referee: Elías Ingi Árnason
2 September 2017
13:00

Hvíti riddarinn	2-0	Álftanes
Kristján Steinn Magnússon 67'; Haukur Eyþórsson 88' (pen.)	ksi.is	Kristófer Örn Kristjánsson (red card) 42'

Tungubakkavöllur, Mosfellsbær
Referee: Guðmundur Ársæll Guðmundsson
2 September 2017
13:00

ÍH	2-1	Kórdrengir
Andri Magnússon 63'; Magnús Stefánsson 74'	ksi.is	Magnús Már Lúðvíksson 90+3'

Kaplakrikavöllur, Hafnarfjörður
Attendance: 73
Referee: Jóhann Ingi Jónsson
2 September 2017
13:00

KH	6-0	Ýmir
Alexander Lúðvígsson 12', 68'; Aron Skúli Brynjarsson 72', 89', 90+3'; Kristján Einar Auðunsson 80'	ksi.is

Valsvöllur, Reykjavík
Attendance: 56
Referee: Pétur Guðmundsson

Second leg

6 September 2017
17:15

Augnablik	2-3	Árborg
Ellert Hreinsson 32'; Hjörtur Júlíus Hjartarson 80' (pen.)	ksi.is	Daníel Ingi Birgisson 15'; Ísak Eldjárn Tómasson 70'; Hálfdán Helgi Hálfdánarson 90'

Fagrilundur, Kópavogur
Attendance: 50
Referee: Arnar Þór Stefánsson

Augnablik won 4-3 on aggregate.

6 September 2017
17:15

Álftanes	4-0 (a.e.t.)	Hvíti riddarinn
Hörður Steinar Harðarson 35' (o.g.); Guðbjörn Alexander Sæmundsson 72'; Hreiðar Ingi Ársælsson 105'; Úlfar Hrafn Pálsson 106'	ksi.is

Bessastaðavöllur, Álftanes
Referee: Bryngeir Valdimarsson

Álftanes won 4-2 on aggregate.

6 September 2017
17:15

Ýmir	2-2	KH
Brynjar Orri Briem 40'; Hörður Magnússon 44'	ksi.is	Aron Elí Sævarsson 74'; Danijel Smiljkovic 76'

Versalavöllur, Kópavogur
Referee: Sigurður Óli Þórleifsson

KH won 8-2 on aggregate.

6 September 2017
19:30

Kórdrengir	2-0	ÍH
Ásgeir Frank Ásgeirsson 75'; Viktor Unnar Illugason 83' (pen.)	ksi.is

Framvöllur, Reykjavík
Referee: Gunnþór Steinar Jónsson

Kórdrengir won 3-2 on aggregate.

=== Semi-finals ===
First leg

10 September 2017
14:00

Augnablik	2-2	Álftanes
Hrannar Bogi Jónsson 32'; Ellert Hreinsson 70'	ksi.is	Andri Janusson 3'; Guðbjörn Alexander Sæmundsson 16'

Fagrilundur, Kópavogur
Attendance: 103
Referee: Aðalbjörn Heiðar Þorsteinsson
10 September 2017
17:00

Kórdrengir	0-1	KH
	ksi.is	Aron Skúli Brynjarsson 15'

Framvöllur, Reykjavík
Referee: Egill Arnar Sigurþórsson

Second leg

13 September 2017
17:00

Álftanes	0-3	Augnablik
	ksi.is	Kári Ársælsson 11'; Hjörvar Hermannsson 45+1'; Hjörtur Júlíus Hjartarson 87'

Bessastaðavöllur, Álftanes
Attendance: 260
Referee: Egill Arnar Sigurþórsson

Augnablik won 5-2 on aggregate

13 September 2017
20:00

KH	1-1	Kórdrengir
Alexander Lúðvígsson 39'	ksi.is	Eyþór Helgi Birgisson 4'

Valsvöllur, Reykjavík
Attendance: 300
Referee: Aðalbjörn Heiðar Þorsteinsson

KH won 2-1 on aggregate

=== Third place match ===
16 September 2017
14:00

Álftanes	9-1	Kórdrengir
Hilmar Rafn Emilsson 7'; Páll Halldór Jóhannesson 14'; Hreiðar Ingi Ársælsson 21'; Björgvin Júlíus Ásgeirsson 32', 36', 42', 45'; Kristján Lýðsson 45+1'; Guðbjörn Alexander Sæmundsson 75'	ksi.is	Sigurjón Daði Valdimarsson 65'

Bessastaðavöllur, Álftanes
Attendance: 85
Referee: Birkir Sigurðarson

=== Final ===
16 September 2017
14:00

Augnablik	0-3	KH
	ksi.is	Hreinn Þorvaldsson 44', 50'; Alexander Lúðvígsson 70'

Kópavogsvöllur, Kópavogur
Referee: Helgi Ólafsson

KH and Augnablik were both promoted to 3. deild karla
