= 2023 Besta deild karla =

- Season: 2023
- Dates: 10 April – 8 October 2023
- Champions: Víkingur Reykjavík
- Relegated: ÍBV; Keflavík
- Champions League: Víkingur Reykjavík
- Conference League: Breiðablik; Stjarnan; Valur
- Matches: 119
- Goals: 404 (3.39 per match)
- Top goalscorer: Emil Atlason (17 goals)
- Biggest home win: Víkingur Reykjavík 6–0 ÍBV (7 May 2023)
- Biggest away win: Fylkir 1–6 Valur (3 May 2023)
- Highest scoring: Stjarnan 5–4 HK (24 April 2023); Breiðablik 5–4 Fram (28 April 2023)
- Longest winning run: 8 matches Víkingur Reykjavík
- Longest unbeaten run: 11 matches Víkingur Reykjavík
- Longest winless run: 19 matches Keflavík
- Longest losing run: 5 matches KR; ÍBV
- All statistics correct as of 24 August 2023.

The 2023 Besta deild karla was the 112th season of top-flight Icelandic football. It was the second season of the league after it was rebranded as Besta deild karla.

The winners (Víkingur Reykjavík) qualified for the 2024–25 Champions League first qualifying round. The second, third, and fourth-placed teams (Breiðablik, Stjarnan, and Valur) qualified for the 2024–25 Conference League first qualifying round. The bottom two teams (ÍBV and Keflavík) were relegated to the 2024 1. deild karla.

== Teams ==
The league consisted of twelve teams; the top ten teams from the previous season, and two teams promoted from 1. deild karla. Breiðablik entered the season as defending champions.

=== Team changes ===
Promoted from 2022 1. deild karla	Relegated to 2023 1. deild karla
Fylkir; HK	ÍA; Leiknir Reykjavík

=== Stadia and locations ===
Locations of the 2023 Besta deild karla teams

Team	Location	Stadium	Capacity
Breiðablik	Kópavogur	Kópavogsvöllur	3,009
FH	Hafnarfjörður	Kaplakriki	6,450
Fram	Reykjavík	Laugardalsvöllur	9,800
Fylkir	Reykjavík	Floridana völlurinn	1,854
HK	Kópavogur	Kórinn	1,452
ÍBV	Vestmannaeyjar	Hásteinsvöllur	2,300 (534 seated)
KA	Akureyri	Akureyrarvöllur (Note: Due to pitch issues, KA held home games at Dalvíkurvöllur in Dalvík.)	1,645
Keflavík	Reykjanesbær	Keflavíkurvöllur	5,200
KR	Reykjavík	Alvogenvöllurinn	3,333
Stjarnan	Garðabær	Samsung völlurinn	1,440
Valur	Reykjavík	Valsvöllur	2,465
Víkingur Reykjavík	Reykjavík	Víkingsvöllur	2,023

== Regular season ==
Pos	Team	Pld	W	D	L	GF	GA	GD	Pts	Qualification
1	Víkingur Reykjavík	22	19	2	1	65	20	+45	59	Qualification for the Championship Round
2	Valur	22	14	3	5	53	25	+28	45	Qualification for the Championship Round
3	Breiðablik	22	11	5	6	44	36	+8	38	Qualification for the Championship Round
4	Stjarnan	22	10	4	8	45	25	+20	34	Qualification for the Championship Round
5	FH	22	10	4	8	41	44	−3	34	Qualification for the Championship Round
6	KR	22	9	5	8	29	36	−7	32	Qualification for the Championship Round
7	KA	22	8	5	9	31	39	−8	29	Qualification for the Relegation Round
8	HK	22	6	7	9	37	48	−11	25	Qualification for the Relegation Round
9	Fylkir	22	5	6	11	29	45	−16	21	Qualification for the Relegation Round
10	Fram	22	5	4	13	32	47	−15	19	Qualification for the Relegation Round
11	ÍBV	22	5	4	13	24	43	−19	19	Qualification for the Relegation Round
12	Keflavík	22	1	9	12	20	42	−22	12	Qualification for the Relegation Round

Source: KSI (in Icelandic), Soccerway
Rules for classification: 1) Points; 2) Goal difference; 3) Goals scored; 4) Head-to-head points; 5) Head-to-head goal difference; 6) Head-to-head goals scored; 7) Head-to-head away goals scored; 8) Play-off (only for deciding champion); 9) Draw.

=== Results ===
Each team plays each other twice (22 matches each), once at home and once away.

Home \ Away	BRE	FH	FRA	FYL	HK	ÍBV	KA	KEF	KR	STJ	VAL	VÍK
Breiðablik	—	0–2	5–4	5–1	3–4	3–1	2–0	2–1	3–4	1–1	1–0	2–2
FH	2–2	—	4–0	2–4	4–3	2–1	0–3	2–1	3–0	1–0	3–2	1–3
Fram	0–1	2–2	—	1–1	3–2	3–1	2–1	4–1	1–2	2–1	1–3	2–3
Fylkir	1–2	4–2	3–1	—	0–0	2–1	1–1	1–2	3–3	0–4	1–6	1–3
HK	5–2	2–2	1–1	1–0	—	2–2	1–2	3–1	1–1	1–1	0–5	1–2
ÍBV	2–1	2–3	1–0	0–1	3–0	—	2–0	1–1	2–2	0–2	0–3	0–1
KA	1–1	4–2	4–2	2–1	1–1	3–0	—	0–0	1–1	2–1	0–4	0–4
Keflavík	0–0	2–3	0–0	1–1	0–2	1–3	3–4	—	0–2	1–1	1–1	3–3
KR	0–1	1–0	3–2	2–0	0–1	1–1	2–0	2–0	—	1–0	0–4	1–2
Stjarnan	0–2	5–0	4–0	2–2	5–4	4–0	4–0	3–0	3–1	—	2–0	0–2
Valur	0–2	1–1	1–0	2–1	4–1	2–1	4–2	0–0	5–0	3–2	—	0–4
Víkingur Reykjavík	5–3	2–0	3–1	2–0	6–1	6–0	1–0	4–1	3–0	2–0	2–3	—

Source: KSI (in Icelandic), Soccerway
Legend: Blue = home team win; Yellow = draw; Red = away team win.

== Championship Round ==
=== League table ===
Pos	Team	Pld	W	D	L	GF	GA	GD	Pts	Qualification
1	Víkingur Reykjavík (C)	27	21	3	3	76	30	+46	66	Qualification for the Champions League first qualifying round
2	Valur	27	17	4	6	66	35	+31	55	Qualification for the Conference League first qualifying round (Note: The 2023 Icelandic Cup winners also qualified for the Conference League first qualifying round. Since the cup winners (Víkingur Reykjavík) qualified based on league position, the Conference League spot was passed to the fourth-placed team.)
3	Stjarnan	27	14	4	9	55	29	+26	46	Qualification for the Conference League first qualifying round
4	Breiðablik	27	12	5	10	52	49	+3	41	Qualification for the Conference League first qualifying round
5	FH	27	12	4	11	49	54	−5	40	
6	KR	27	10	7	10	38	48	−10	37	

Source: Soccerway
Rules for classification: 1) Points; 2) Goal difference; 3) Goals scored; 4) Head-to-head points; 5) Head-to-head goal difference; 6) Head-to-head goals scored; 7) Head-to-head away goals scored; 8) Play-off (only for deciding champion); 9) Draw.
(C) Champions

=== Results ===
Each team plays each other once (5 matches), either at home or away.

Home \ Away	BRE	FH	KR	STJ	VAL	VÍK
Breiðablik	—	0–2	—	0–2	—	3–1
FH	—	—	3–1	1–3	—	—
KR	4–3	—	—	—	2–2	—
Stjarnan	—	—	2–0	—	—	3–1
Valur	4–2	4–1	—	2–0	—	—
Víkingur Reykjavík	—	2–1	2–2	—	5–1	—

Legend: Blue = home team win; Yellow = draw; Red = away team win.

== Relegation Round ==
=== League table ===
Pos	Team	Pld	W	D	L	GF	GA	GD	Pts	Relegation
1	KA	27	12	5	10	42	45	−3	41	
2	Fylkir	27	7	8	12	43	55	−12	29	
3	HK	27	6	9	12	41	55	−14	27	
4	Fram	27	7	6	14	40	56	−16	27	
5	ÍBV (R)	27	6	7	14	31	50	−19	25	Relegation to 1. deild karla
6	Keflavík (R)	27	2	10	15	27	54	−27	16	Relegation to 1. deild karla

Source: Soccerway
Rules for classification: 1) Points; 2) Goal difference; 3) Goals scored; 4) Head-to-head points; 5) Head-to-head goal difference; 6) Head-to-head goals scored; 7) Head-to-head away goals scored; 8) Play-off (only for deciding champion); 9) Draw.
(R) Relegated

=== Results ===
Each team plays each other once (5 matches), either at home or away.

Home \ Away	FRA	FYL	HK	ÍBV	KA	KEF
Fram	—	—	—	—	1–0	3–1
Fylkir	5–1	—	—	2–2	2–4	—
HK	1–1	2–2	—	0–1	—	—
ÍBV	2–2	—	—	—	—	1–1
KA	—	—	1–0	2–1	—	4–2
Keflavík	—	1–3	2–1	—	—	—

Legend: Blue = home team win; Yellow = draw; Red = away team win.

== Top scorers ==
As of 20 August 2023

Rank	Player	Club	Goals
1	(Iceland) Tryggvi Hrafn Haraldsson	Valur	11
2	(Iceland) Birnir Snær Ingason	Víkingur Reykjavik	10
2	(Denmark) Nikolaj Hansen	Víkingur Reykjavik	10
2	(Iceland) Stefán Ingi Sigurðarson	Breiðablik	10
5	(Iceland) Emil Atlason	Stjarnan	9
6	(Iceland) Adam Pálsson	Valur	8
6	(Brazil) Fred Saraiva	Fram	8
6	(Iceland) Kjartan Finnbogason	FH	8
9	(Iceland) Danijel Djuric	Víkingur Reykjavik	7
9	(Iceland) Gísli Eyjólfsson	Breiðablik	7
9	(Iceland) Ulfur Björnsson	FH	7
