= Alejandro Zambrano =

Spanish footballer

Álex Zambrano
Personal information
- Full name: Alejandro Zambrano Martín
- Date of birth: 4 August 1991 (age 35)
- Place of birth: Huelva, Spain
- Height: 1.79 m (5 ft 10 in)
- Position: Midfielder

Team information
- Current team: Hvíti Riddarinn

Youth career
- 2002–2009: Recreativo

Senior career*
Years	Team	Apps	(Gls)
2009–2011	Recreativo B	26	(7)
2011–2012	Recreativo	19	(0)
2012–2013	Villarreal B	17	(1)
2013–2014	Sporting Gijón B	26	(2)
2014–2015	San Roque	31	(3)
2015–2018	Recreativo	67	(3)
2018–2019	Don Benito	33	(2)
2019–2020	Afturelding	25	(1)
2021	Yeclano	16	(1)
2021–2022	Internacional Madrid	27	(0)
2022–2023	Antequera	18	(0)
2024–2025	Dalvík/Reynir	37	(0)
2026–	Hvíti Riddarinn	7	(0)
- * Club domestic league appearances and goals as of 14 October 2026

Alejandro 'Álex' Zambrano Martín (born 4 August 1991) is a Spanish footballer who plays for Icelandic club Hvíti Riddarinn as a midfielder.

== Club career ==
Born in Huelva, Andalusia, Zambrano was a product of Recreativo de Huelva's youth system. He made his senior debut with their reserves in the 2009–10 season, in the Tercera División.

Zambrano was promoted to the first team for the 2011–12 campaign, with the Andalusians in the Segunda División. He made his league debut on 27 August, starting and being booked in a 1–0 away loss against Deportivo de La Coruña.

On 25 August 2012, Zambrano terminated his contract with Recre and signed for Villarreal CF B in the same league. He moved to another reserve team in July 2013, Sporting de Gijón B from Segunda División B.

On 18 August 2014, Zambrano joined CD San Roque de Lepe also in the third tier. On 16 July of the following year, he returned to his first club Recreativo after agreeing to a two-year deal.

Zambrano left the Estadio Nuevo Colombino in the summer of 2018, signing with third-division side CD Don Benito. He remained in the lower leagues subsequently, and also played in Iceland with Ungmennafélagið Afturelding and Dalvík/Reynir; additionally, still before his retirement, he worked at the latter's academy.

== Personal life ==
Zambrano's father and uncle, respectively Manuel and Antonio, were also footballers. They too represented Recreativo professionally; during his spell there, the former also acted as the club's president.
