= Guðmundur Mete =

Icelandic footballer

Personal information
- Full name: Guðmundur Viðar Mete
- Date of birth: 2 April 1981 (age 45)
- Place of birth: Norðfjörður, Iceland
- Height: 1.87 m (6 ft 1 1/2 in)
- Position: Defender

Youth career
- 1987–1999: Malmö FF

Senior career*
Years	Team	Apps	(Gls)
2000–2002	Malmö FF	34	(0)
2001	→ FC Midtjylland (loan)	1	(0)
2003–2004	IFK Norrköping	27	(1)
2005–2008	Keflavík	48	(0)
2009	Valur	12	(0)
2010–2012	Haukar	26	(0)
2013	Afturelding	5	(0)
Total		153	(1)

International career
1997–1998	Iceland U17	9	(1)
1998–1999	Iceland U19	9	(0)
2000–2003	Iceland U21	11	(0)

Managerial career
- 2013: Hvíti Riddarinn
- * Club domestic league appearances and goals as of 15:27, 15 April 2020 (UTC)

Guðmundur Viðar Mete (born 2 April 1981) is an Icelandic former footballer who played as a defender.

Guðmundur started his career in the Swedish leagues with Malmö FF, playing 34 league matches between 2000 and 2002. During this time, he also had a short loan spell in Denmark with FC Midtjylland in 2001. After leaving Malmö, Guðmundur spent two seasons with Superettan club IFK Norrköping, before returning to his home country with Keflavík in 2005. He played 54 league and cup matches in four years with the club, and later had spells with Valur and Haukar before joining Afturelding ahead of the 2013 season.

Upon his arrival at Afturelding, Guðmundur was also installed as manager of the club's feeder team Hvíti Riddarinn.
