= John Andrews (footballer, born 1978) =

Irish footballer

Personal information
- Full name: John Henry Andrews
- Date of birth: 27 September 1978 (age 48)
- Place of birth: Cork, Ireland
- Position: Defender

Senior career*
Years	Team	Apps	(Gls)
1996–1998	Coventry City	0	(0)
1998	Shepshed Dynamo	?	(?)
1998–1999	Grantham Town	29	(1)
1999–2002	Mansfield Town	38	(1)
2001–2002	→ Hucknall Town (loan)	?	(?)
2002–2003	Cork City		
2003	→ Cobh Ramblers (loan)		
2003–2004	Cobh Ramblers		
2008–2012	Afturelding	84	(8)

Managerial career
- 2008–2010: Hvíti Riddarinn
- 2010–: Afturelding (women's team)
- 2019–2025: Víkingur
- 2025–: KR
- * Club domestic league appearances and goals

John Andrews (born 27 September 1978) is an Irish football coach and former player.

He is former coach of the women's team at Icelandic club Afturelding, with whom he spent five seasons as a player between 2008 and 2012. Andrews made appearances in the Football League for Mansfield Town and also spent time in English non-League football. Between 2002 and 2004, he had spells in his native Ireland with both Cobh Ramblers and his hometown club Cork City. He has now taken on the task of Assistant Manager and head of Strength and Conditioning for Dsk Shivajians and the Liverpool International Academy in India.

== Playing career ==
Andrews started his senior career with Coventry City, but did not make any first-team appearances for the club and left in May 1998. He then had unsuccessful short spells with several Football League clubs, including Reading. He joined Shepshed Dynamo in time for the 1998–99 season before being signed by Southern League Premier Division side Grantham Town in November 1998. Andrews went on to play 29 league matches for Grantham and scored his only goal for the club in the 3–0 win against Rothwell Town on 27 February 1999.

In August 1999, Andrews joined Football League Third Division club Mansfield Town on a free transfer. He made his professional debut on 6 November 1999 in the 5–2 victory over Lincoln City at Field Mill. He was an almost ever-present for the side during the second half of the 1999–2000 season and scored his first and only goal for the club in the 2–2 draw with Plymouth Argyle on the final day of the campaign. He made a handful of appearances in the first three months of the following season, but was following a 0–4 defeat to Peterborough United in an FA Cup first round replay on 28 November 2000 and never played for the club again. He was sent out on loan to Northern Premier League outfit Hucknall Town for the duration of the 2001–02 campaign before being released by Mansfield in May 2002 at the end of his contract. In total, he played 46 first-team games for the club, 38 of them in the league.

Following his release by Mansfield, Andrews returned to his hometown to join Cork City. He spent one season with Cork but failed to secure a regular starting berth and subsequently moved on loan to Cobh Ramblers in 2003, a move which was later made permanent. Andrews left Cobh in 2004 to move to the United States, where he played collegiate football with the Martin Methodist RedHawks. On 26 October 2007, it was announced that Andrews had agreed to join Icelandic 2. deild karla club Afturelding for the 2008 season. He made his first appearance for Afturelding on 16 May 2008, coming on as a late substitute for Wentzel Kamban in the 2–2 draw away at ÍH and went on to play 22 first-team matches during the season as the side won promotion to the 1. deild karla. At the end of the campaign, he was one of four Afturelding players awarded a place in the Team of the Year by the KSÍ along with Rannver Sigurjónsson, Tómas Jorsteinsson and Paul Clapson.

Andrews netted his first goal in Icelandic football in the 1–4 defeat to Þór Akureyri on 12 September 2009. The 2009 season ended in disappointment as Afturelding returned to the 2. deild karla after only one season in the second tier. Andrews cemented his place in the starting line-up over the following two years, and had amassed 70 league appearances for Afturelding by the end of the 2011 campaign. The 2012 season proved to be his last as a player as he scored four goals in 23 matches in all competitions, before announcing his retirement at the end of the campaign to concentrate on management.

== Coaching career ==
During his time at the Martin Methodist College, Andrews spent time as an assistant coach of the women's soccer team in the 2007–08 season. When his transfer to Afturelding was announced in October 2007, it was confirmed that Andrews would also train the men's reserve team and act as assistant manager to fellow Irishman Gareth O'Sullivan, with whom he had worked during his time in America, in the club's women's team. During the 2008 season Andrews was appointed manager of the reserve side Hvíti Riddarinn, the main feeder club to Afturelding, and he led the team to a fifth-place finish in their return to league football. In November 2008, Andrews confirmed that he would continue to train the side for the following campaign. He took Hvíti Riddarinn to the promotion play-offs in 2009, and the side progressed to the semi-finals before losing 2–5 to Völsungur at the Húsavíkurvöllur.

On 23 July 2010, Andrews was appointed manager of the Afturelding women's team until the end of the season following the departure of former coach Ásgrímur Helgi Einarsson. Nevertheless, he retained his position as the head coach of both Hvíti Riddarinn and the Afturelding reserve side, which meant he would coach three teams in addition to his role as a player. He guided the women's team to an eighth-place finish in the Úrvalsdeild kvenna, securing their place in the top division for another season. In November 2010, Andrews left his post at Hvíti Riddarinn and signed a two-year contract as manager of the women's side. He again guided the team to safety in the 2011 season and in October of the same year he was offered a one-year extension to his contract, taking him through to the end of the 2013 campaign. On 21 September 2012, Andrews signed a new two-year contract with Afturelding after leading the team to a seventh-placed finish in the Úrvalsdeild kvenna that summer.
