= Þróttur =

Þróttur may refer to:

- Knattspyrnufélagið Þróttur, also known as Þróttur Reykjavík, a sports club based in Reykjavík, Iceland.
- Þróttur Neskaupstað, a multi-sport club based in Fjarðarbyggð, Iceland.
- Ungmennafélagið Þróttur, also known as Þróttur Vogum, a sports club based in Vogar, Iceland.
