= Kostyantyn Pikul =

Ukrainian footballer

Personal information
- Full name: Kostyantyn Vitaliyovych Pikul
- Date of birth: 3 June 1995 (age 31)
- Place of birth: Zhovtneve, Ukraine
- Height: 1.86 m (6 ft 1 in)
- Position: Centre-back

Team information
- Current team: Þróttur V.

Youth career
- 2008–2012: VIK-Volyn Volodymyr-Volynskyi

Senior career*
Years	Team	Apps	(Gls)
2012	Shakhtar Novovolynsk	0	(0)
2013–2015	Burevisnyk Kremenets	1	(0)
2016–2018	Nyva Ternopil	47	(2)
2018–2022	Alians Lypova Dolyna	83	(9)
2022–2023	Þróttur R.	39	(1)
2024–	Þróttur V.	48	(0)
- * Club domestic league appearances and goals as of 14 October 2026

Kostyantyn Vitaliyovych Pikul (Ukrainian: Костянтин Віталійович Пікуль; born 3 June 1995) is a Ukrainian professional footballer who plays as a centre-back for Þróttur Vogum.
