= Manolo Zambrano =

Spanish footballer and manager

Personal information
- Full name: Manuel Zambrano Díaz
- Date of birth: 8 March 1960 (age 66)
- Place of birth: Huelva, Spain
- Height: 1.81 m (5 ft 11 1/2 in)
- Position: Midfielder

Youth career
- Recreativo

Senior career*
Years	Team	Apps	(Gls)
1978–1984	Recreativo	162	(17)
1984–1985	Málaga	33	(1)
1985–1987	Sevilla	59	(2)
1987–1990	Celta	76	(8)
1990–1992	Murcia	37	(3)
Total		367	(31)

International career
1979	Spain U19	3	(0)
1979	Spain U20	1	(0)

Managerial career
- 1999–2001: Olont
- 2001–2002: Ayamonte
- 2002–2004: San Fernando
- 2004–2007: Cartaya
- 2007–2008: Recreativo B
- 2008: Recreativo
- * Club domestic league appearances and goals

Manuel "Manolo" Zambrano Díaz (born 8 March 1960) is a Spanish former football midfielder and manager.

== Playing career ==
Born in Huelva, Andalusia, Zambrano finished his youth career at Recreativo de Huelva, and made his first-team – and La Liga – debut on 3 September 1978 at the age of only 18, coming on as a second-half substitute in a 3–0 home win against Real Zaragoza. On 18 May 1980 he scored his first professional goal, the last in a 3–1 away victory over Getafe Deportivo in the Segunda División.

Zambrano signed for neighbouring CD Málaga in summer of 1984, and scored his first goal in the top division on 30 March of the following year, opening a 1–1 home draw with RCD Español. His team was eventually relegated at the end of the season, and he signed with fellow league club Sevilla FC shortly after.

After 72 competitive matches at the Ramón Sánchez Pizjuán Stadium (three goals), Zambrano joined RC Celta de Vigo in 1987. He retired with Real Murcia CF in 1992 at the age of 32, mainly due to hernia injuries.

== Coaching career ==
Zambrano started working as a coach with amateurs Olont CF, and also had lower league spells at Ayamonte CF, CD San Fernando and AD Cartaya. In 2007, he returned to his first club Recreativo, being appointed manager of the reserves.

On 4 February 2008, Zambrano replaced the fired Víctor Muñoz at the helm of the main squad. After narrowly avoiding top-flight relegation he renewed his contract on 23 May, but was dismissed on 7 October.

On 6 October 2016, Zambrano was elected Recreativo's new president.

== Personal life ==
Zambrano's brother and son, respectively Antonio and Alejandro, were also footballers. They too represented Recreativo professionally.

== Managerial statistics ==
As of 20 August 2017

Managerial record by team and tenure
Team	Nat	From	To	Record								Ref
Team	Nat	From	To	G	W	D	L	GF	GA	GD	Win %	Ref
Olont	(Spain)	1 July 1999	30 June 2001	68	36	16	16	99	64	+35	52.94	
Ayamonte	(Spain)	1 July 2001	30 June 2002	38	18	9	11	39	32	+7	47.37	
San Fernando	(Spain)	1 July 2002	30 June 2004	82	34	18	30	115	99	+16	41.46	
Cartaya	(Spain)	1 July 2004	30 June 2007	102	42	31	29	152	124	+28	41.18	
Recreativo B	(Spain)	1 July 2007	4 February 2008	23	15	7	1	51	11	+40	65.22	
Recreativo	(Spain)	4 February 2008	7 October 2008	22	7	5	10	24	41	−17	31.82	
Career Total				335	152	86	97	480	371	+109	45.37	—
