= Oliver Bjerrum Jensen =

Danish association football player (born 2002)

Personal information
- Full name: Oliver Bjerrum Jensen
- Date of birth: 30 April 2002 (age 24)
- Place of birth: Sunds, Denmark
- Position: Midfielder

Team information
- Current team: Thisted
- Number: 18

Youth career
- –2015: Sunds IF
- 2015–2017: Midtjylland
- 2017–2022: Randers

Senior career*
Years	Team	Apps	(Gls)
2019–2024	Randers	2	(0)
2023	→ Afturelding (loan)	24	(4)
2024	Afturelding	24	(1)
2025–	Thisted	45	(0)

International career
2019–2020	Denmark U18	5	(0)
2020	Denmark U19	1	(0)
- * Club domestic league appearances and goals as of 18 June 2026

Oliver Bjerrum Jensen (born 30 April 2002) is a Danish professional footballer who plays as a midfielder for Danish 2nd Division club Thisted FC.

== Career ==
=== Randers ===
Bjerrum Jensen played for Sunds IF and FC Midtjylland, before he joined Randers FC as a U17 player. In April 2019, he signed a three-year youth contract with Randers.

Bjerrum Jensen made his official debut for Randers on 30 October 2019 against Viby IF in the Danish Cup. On 28 June 2020, Bjerrum Jensen made his Danish Superliga debut against AC Horsens. He started on the bench, but replaced Tosin Kehinde in the 86th minute. Those two games were his only professional appearances in the 2019–20 season.

In the 2020–21 season, Bjerrum Jensen only played for Randers' U19 side. On 3 May 2022, Bjerrum Jensen signed a two-year contract extension with Randers and was promoted to the first team squad. After limited playing time in Randers, Jensen went on trial with Norwegian IK Start in January 2023.

On 12 April 2023, Bjerrum Jensen was loaned out to Icelandic Lengjudeild club Afturelding until end of 2023.

After returning to Randers, the club confirmed on 2 February 2024 that they had terminated Bjerrum Jensen's contract. After leaving Randers, Jensen continued in Afturelding, where he played until the end of 2024.

On March 29, 2025, Jensen was suddenly on the team card of Danish 2nd Division club Thisted FC. However, the move was not confirmed until April 4, 2025, when it was announced that Jensen had signed until the end of the season.

On 1 June 2026, Hvidovre IF from the Danish 1st Division announced the signing of Jensen from the upcoming season.
