= KFB =

KFB can refer to:

- Air Botnia O/Y, former name of Finnish airline Blue1; see List of defunct airlines of Finland
- Fukushima Broadcasting, in Fukushima, Japan
- Kaifeng North railway station, in Kaifeng, Henan Province, China
- KF Besëlidhja Prishtinë, former football club in Pristina, Kosovo
- KFB mode of a block cipher, in cryptography
- Knit front and back, knitting technique
- Kolami, Central Dravidian language of India
- Korean Franciscan Brotherhood, Franciscan community in Korea
- WKFB, a radio station in Jeannette, Pennsylvania, U.S.

== See also ==
- Megan Jean and the KFB, American folk punk band
