= Knattspyrnufélag Austfjarða =

KFA
- Full name: Knattspyrnufélag Austfjarða
- Nickname
- Founded: 2022
- Ground: Fjarðabyggðarhöllin, Reyðarfjörður, Fjarðabyggð
- Manager: Brynjar Skúlason
- League: 2. deild karla
- 2025: 2. deild karla, 6th of 12
Home colours

Knattspyrnufélag Austfjarða (Icelandic pronunciation: [ˈkʰnahtˌspɪ(r)tnʏˌfjɛːˌlaːɣ ˈœystˌfjarða], lit. 'Eastfjords Football Club'), commonly known as just KFA, is an Icelandic football club from the municipality of Fjarðabyggð located on the east coast of Iceland.

The club was founded in 2022 with a merger of two clubs, Leiknir Fáskrúðsfjörður and Fjarðabyggð and was named Eastfjords (Austfjarða) Football Club.

== History ==
KFA is composed of the following clubs in Fjarðabyggð:

- Íþróttafélagið Þróttur (Neskaupsstaður)
- Ungmennafélagið Austri (Eskifjörður)
- Ungmennafélagið Valur (Reyðarfjörður)
- Ungmennafélagið Leiknir (Fáskrúðsfjörður)
- Ungmennafélagið Súlan (Stöðvarfjörður) and
- Ungmennafélagið Hrafnkell Freysgoði (Breiðdalsvík).

With the establishment of KFA all the main sports clubs in the municipality have banded together in fielding a football team.

== Current squad ==
As of 25 July 2025

Note: Flags indicate national team as defined under FIFA eligibility rules; some limited exceptions apply. Players may hold more than one non-FIFA nationality.

No.	Pos.	Nation	Player
—	MF	ISL	Arnar Bjarki Björgvinsson
—	FW	ALG	Jawed Boumeddane
—	GK	LBN	Danny El-Hage
—	DF	BRA	Matheus Bissi
—	MF	ISL	Patrekur Aron Grétarsson
—	DF	POL	Arkadiusz Grzelak
—	DF	ISL	Adam Örn Guðmundsson
—	FW	ISL	Hrafn Guðmundsson
—	MF	ISL	Nenni Þór Guðmundsson
—	DF	ISL	Ólafur Bernharð Hallgrímsson
—	MF	ISL	Unnar Ari Hansson

No.	Pos.	Nation	Player
—	GK	MNE	Milan Jelovac
—	MF	ISL	Eggert Gunnþór Jónsson
—	FW	FRA	Jacques Bayo
—	FW	ESP	Javi Montserrat
—	DF	ISL	Geir Sigurbjörn Ómarsson
—	MF	ISL	Birkir Ingi Óskarsson
—	FW	ISL	Heiðar Snær Ragnarsson
—	DF	ISL	Þór Sigurjónsson
—	MF	ISL	Nikola Kristinn Stojanovic
—	FW	ISL	Marteinn Már Sverrisson
—	MF	ESP	Imanol Vergara
