= Grafarvogur =

Coordinates: 64°08′50″N 21°47′0″W

- District
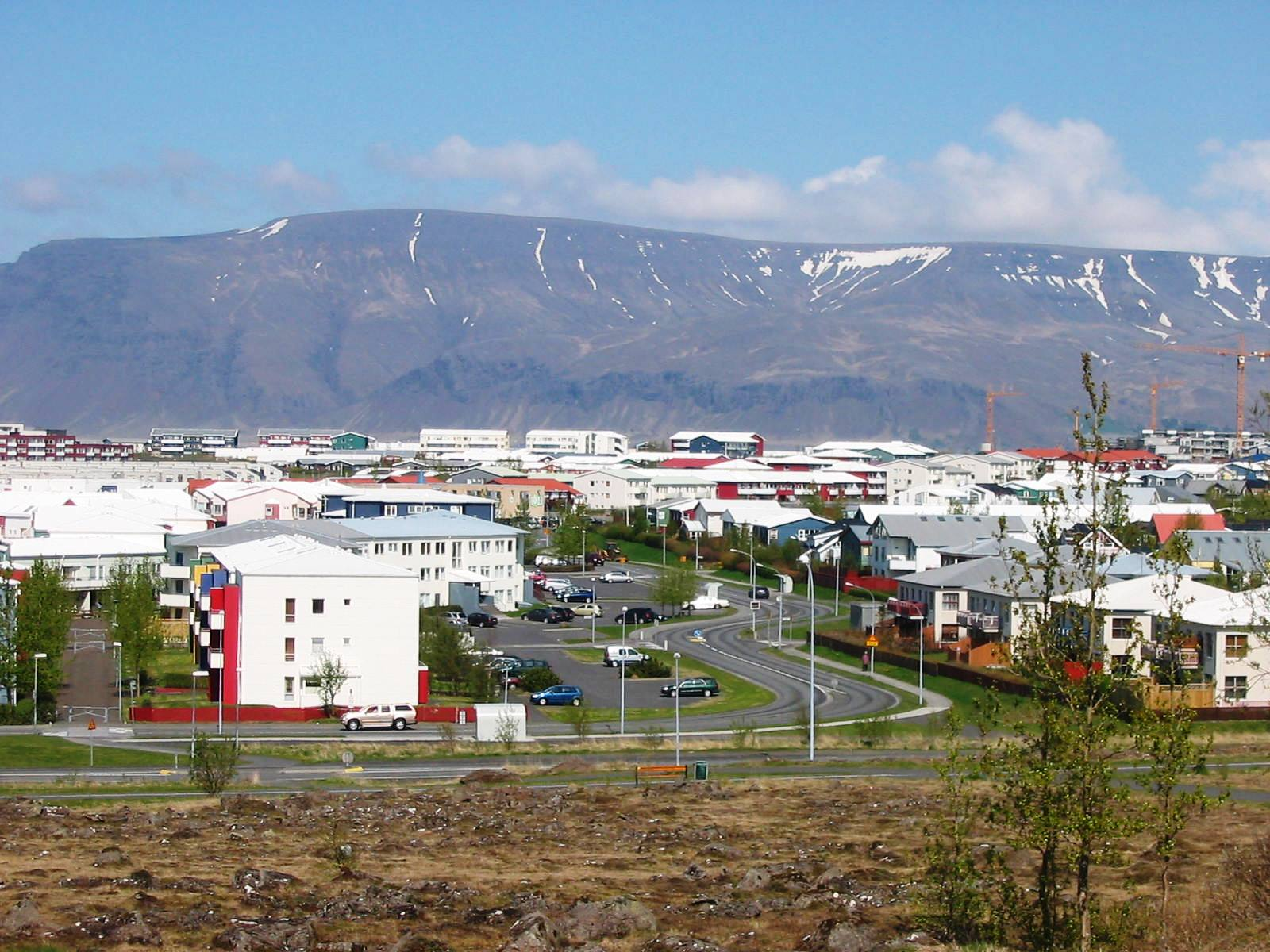
- View towards Rimahverfi

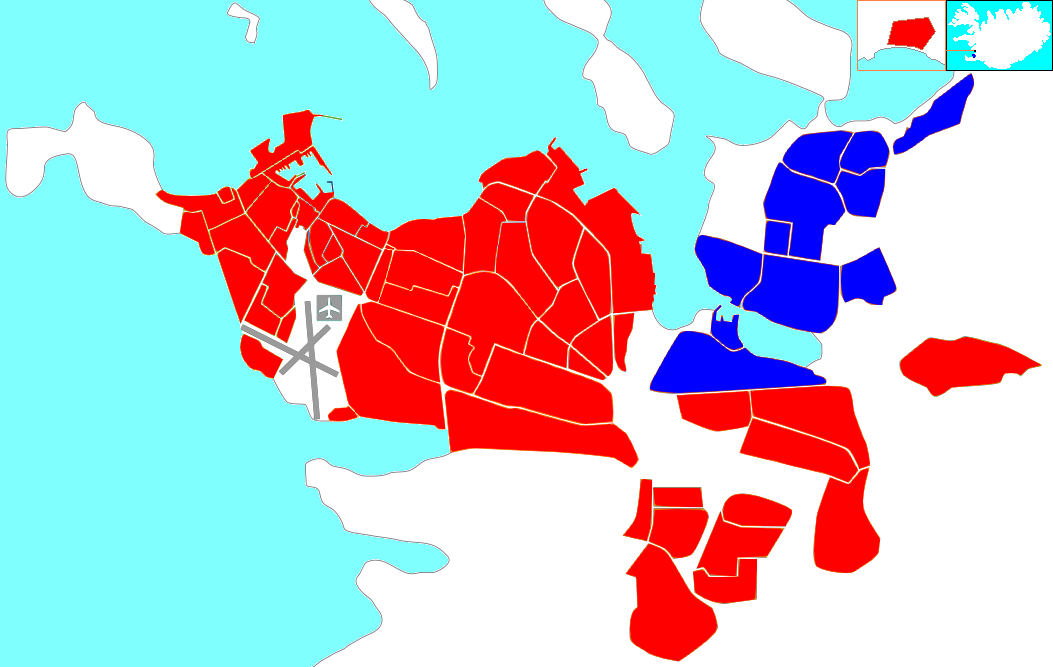
- Country: Iceland
- Municipality: Reykjavík

Area
  - District: 14 km^{2} (5.4 sq mi)
  - Urban: 7.7 km^{2} (3.0 sq mi)

Population (2010)
  - District: 18,000
  - Density: 1,300/km^{2} (3,300/sq mi)
- Postal code: IS-112

Grafarvogur (Icelandic pronunciation: [ˈkraːvarˌvɔːɣʏr̥]) is among the largest residential districts of Reykjavík, Iceland. It is a relatively new neighbourhood and is located on the eastern-most side of Reykjavík. Major construction began in the late 1980s and continued well into the 1990s.

== Neighbourhoods ==
The district includes 15 neighbourhoods: Hamrar [ˈhamrar̥], Foldir [ˈfɔltɪr̥], Hús [ˈhuːs], Rimar [ˈrɪːmar̥], Borgir [ˈpɔrcɪr̥], Víkur [ˈviːkʏr̥], Engi [ˈeiɲcɪ], Spöng [ˈspœyŋk], Staðir [ˈstaːðɪr̥], Höfðar [ˈhœvðar̥], Bryggjuhverfi [ˈprɪccʏˌkʰvɛrvɪ], Geirsnef [ˈceir̥sˌnɛːf], Gufunes [ˈkʏːvʏˌnɛːs], Keldur, and Geldinganes [ˈcɛltiŋkaˌnɛːs]. Of those, five (Rimar, Hamrar, Borgir, Víkur and Foldir) fall within the boundaries of the historic Gufunes estate.

== Shopping ==
Grafarvogur currently has one medium-sized shopping centre called Spöngin. It's not a mall in itself but a cluster of shops, Hagkaup being the largest. Also, there are small clusters of shops in Hverafold, in Víkurvegur and Langirimi Streets. These shopping centres are much smaller and contain only a few shops, the supermarkets being the largest.
