= Fjölnisvöllur =

Stadium in Iceland

(Iceland) Fjölnisvöllur
- Interactive map of (Iceland) Fjölnisvöllur
- Location: Grafarvogur, Reykjavík, Iceland
- Coordinates: 64.1384527°N 21.7907599°W
- Capacity: 1,200

Tenants
- Fjölnir; Vængir Júpíters

Fjölnisvöllur (Icelandic pronunciation: [ˈfjœlnɪsˌvœtlʏr̥], lit. 'Fjölnir Field' or more precisely 'Fjölnir Stadium') is a football stadium in Iceland. It is located in Grafarvogur, Reykjavík, and seats 700 individuals in one stand, but can hold about 500 standing spectators additionally. It is the home stadium for Icelandic football team Fjölnir.
