= Varmárvöllur =

Multi-use stadium in Mosfellsbær, Iceland

(Iceland) Varmárvöllur
- Interactive map of (Iceland) Varmárvöllur
- Location: Mosfellsbær, Iceland
- Coordinates: 64.1691253°N 21.6916982°W
- Capacity: 2,500

Tenants
- Afturelding; Hvíti Riddarinn

Varmárvöllur (lit. 'Varmá Field' or more precisely 'Varmá Stadium') is a multi-use stadium in Mosfellsbær, Iceland. It is currently used mostly for football matches and is the home stadium of Ungmennafélagið Afturelding. Its capacity is around 2.500.
