= Dalvíkurvöllur =

Sports venue in Dalvík, Iceland

(Iceland) Dalvíkurvöllur
- Interactive map of (Iceland) Dalvíkurvöllur
- Location: Dalvík, Iceland
- Coordinates: 65.9667147°N 18.5377611°W
- Capacity: 2,000

Tenant
- Dalvík/Reynir

Dalvíkurvöllur (lit. 'Dalvík Field' or more precisely 'Dalvík Stadium') is a multi-use stadium in Dalvík, Iceland. It is currently used mostly for football matches and is the home stadium of Dalvík/Reynir. Its capacity is around 2000.
