= Hvíti Riddarinn =

- Full name: Hvíti Riddarinn
- Sport: Football; Handball; Basketball
- Founded: 14 May 1998; 28 years ago
- Based in: Mosfellsbær
- Colours: Black, White
- Affiliation: Afturelding

Hvíti Riddarinn
- Full name: Hvíti Riddarinn
- Ground: Varmárvöllur, Mosfellsbær, Iceland
- Capacity: 2,500
- Chairman: Guðbjörn Smári Birgisson
- Manager: Sindri Snær Ólafsson
- League: 2. deild karla
- 2025: 3. deild karla, 1st of 12 (champions; promoted)

Hvíti Riddarinn (English: The White Knight) is a multi-sport club based in Mosfellsbær, Iceland. It was founded on 14 August 1998 and through its history has fielded departments in football, handball and basketball.

== Football ==
=== Men's football ===
The club has fielded a men's football team since 2001. It has played in the Icelandic football tournament since 2005.

==== Notable coaches ====
- John Andrews
- Guðmundur Viðar Mete

=== Women's football ===
In 2015, the club fielded a women's football team for the first time when it participated in the Icelandic second-tier 1. deild kvenna.
