= Knattspyrnufélagið Kári =

Kári
- Full name: Knattspyrnufélagið Kári
- Founded: 22 May 1922; 103 years ago 13 April 2011; 14 years ago (reformed)
- Ground: Akraneshöllin, Akranes, Iceland
- Capacity: 5,550 (852 seated)
- Chairman: Sveinbjörn Geir Hlöðversson
- Manager: Aron Ýmir Pétursson, Andri Júlíusson, Alexander Aron Davorsson
- League: 2. deild karla
- 2025: 2. deild karla, 9th of 12
Home colours	Away colours

Knattspyrnufélagið Kári (Icelandic pronunciation: [ˈkʰnahtˌspɪ(r)tnʏˌfjɛːˌlaijɪð ˈkʰauːrɪ], lit. 'Kári Football Club' (Note: Knattspyrnufélagið is the definite form of Knattspyrnufélag, meaning "the football club".)), commonly known as Kári, is an Icelandic football club from the town of Akranes. The club's football team is playing in the third tier of Icelandic football.

== Current squad ==
As of 25 July 2025

Note: Flags indicate national team as defined under FIFA eligibility rules; some limited exceptions apply. Players may hold more than one non-FIFA nationality.

No.	Pos.	Nation	Player
—	DF	ISL	Finnbogi Laxdal Aðalgeirsson
—	MF	ISL	Marinó Hilmar Ásgeirsson
—	MF	ISL	Sigurjón Logi Bergþórsson
—	MF	ISL	Benedikt Ísar Björgvinsson
—	MF	ISL	Máni Berg Ellertsson
—	MF	ISL	Hektor Bergmann Garðarsson
—	FW	ISL	Matthías Daði Gunnarsson
—	DF	ISL	Sveinn Svavar Hallgrímsson
—	DF	ISL	Mikael Hrafn Helgason

No.	Pos.	Nation	Player
—	MF	ISL	Kristian Mar Marenarson
—	DF	ISL	Benjamín Mehic
—	DF	ISL	Gísli Fannar Ottesen
—	DF	ISL	Birkir Hrafn Samúelsson
—	FW	ISL	Börkur Bernharð Sigmundsson
—	GK	ISL	Kristján Hjörvar Sigurkarlsson
—	MF	ISL	Marteinn Theodórsson
—	DF	ISL	Þór Llorens Þórðarson
—	FW	ISL	Sigurður Hrannar Þorsteinsson
—	MF	ISL	Tómas Týr Tómasson
—	DF	POL	Oskar Wasilewski
