= Haukar (men's football) =

- Full name: Knattspyrnufélagið Haukar
- Founded: 12 April 1931; 95 years ago
- Ground: Ásvellir, Hafnarfjörður, Iceland
- Capacity: 2,120
- Head Coach: Guðjón Pétur Lýðsson
- League: 2. deild karla
- 2026: 2. deild karla, 1th of 12
- Website: http://www.haukar.is/knattspyrna/
Home colours	Away colours

The Haukar men's football (Icelandic pronunciation: [ˈhøyːkar̥]) team is the men's football department of the Haukar multi-sport club. It is based in Hafnarfjörður, Iceland, and currently plays in the 2. deild karla, the third-tier men's football league in Iceland. In 2010, the team was promoted to the top-tier Úrvalsdeild karla for the first time in 31 years. They finished second to last in the league during the 2010 season and were relegated back to 1. deild karla. On May 16, 2012, Haukar defeated Snæfell 31–0 in the Icelandic Football Cup.

== Current squad ==
As of 25 July 2025

Note: Flags indicate national team as defined under FIFA eligibility rules; some limited exceptions apply. Players may hold more than one non-FIFA nationality.

No.	Pos.	Nation	Player
—	GK	ISL	Þorsteinn Ómar Ágústsson
—	DF	ISL	Eiríkur Örn Beck
—	DF	ISL	Tómas Atli Björgvinsson
—	DF	ISL	Bjarki Viðar Björnsson
—	MF	ISL	Birkir Brynjarsson
—	MF	ISL	Fannar Óli Friðleifsson
—	FW	ISL	Theodór Ernir Geirsson
—	MF	ISL	Óliver Steinar Guðmundsson
—	GK	ISL	Sveinn Óli Guðnason
—	MF	ISL	Magnús Ingi Halldórsson
—	GK	ISL	Heiðar Máni Hermannsson
—	FW	ISL	Guðmundur Axel Hilmarsson
—	FW	ISL	Daði Snær Ingason

No.	Pos.	Nation	Player
—	DF	ISL	Andri Steinn Ingvarsson
—	MF	ISL	Baltasar Trausti Ingvarsson
—	MF	ISL	Ísak Jónsson
—	MF	ISL	Guðjón Pétur Lýðsson
—	MF	ISL	Haukur Darri Pálsson
—	MF	ISL	Ævar Daði Segatta
—	DF	ISL	Daníel Smári Sigurðsson
—	DF	ISL	Máni Mar Steinbjörnsson
—	MF	ISL	Óliver Þorkellsson
—	DF	ISL	Hallur Húni Þorsteinsson
—	MF	ISL	Alexander Aron Tómasson
—	MF	UKR	Kostyantyn Yaroshenko

== Honors ==
2. deild karla

- Winners (2): 2001, 2007, 2026

3. deild karla

- Winners (2): 1989, 2000
