= Þróttur Vogum =

- Full name: Ungmennafélagið Þróttur
- Short name: Þróttur V.
- Sport: Basketball; Football; Judo; Swimming
- Founded: 23 October 1932; 93 years ago
- Based in: Vogar
- Website: throtturvogum.is

Ungmennafélagið Þróttur (Icelandic pronunciation: [ˈuŋkˌmɛnːaˌfjɛːˌlaijɪð ˈθrouhtʏr̥], lit. 'Strength Youth Club' (Note: Ungmennafélagið is the definite form of Ungmennafélag, meaning "the youth club".)), commonly known as Þróttur Vogum (Icelandic pronunciation: [ˈθrouhtʏr̥ ˈvɔːɣʏm]), is an Icelandic sports club from the town of Vogar.

== Basketball ==
=== Men's basketball ===
In 2007, Þróttur men's team won the 2. deild karla and were promoted to the second-tier 1. deild karla. The following season, it finished last in the 1. deild karla and were relegated back to 2. deild karla. After not fielding a team for several seasons, Þróttur returned to the national tournament in 2020 and registered a team in the 3. deild karla. In 2022, the team finished as the runner-up in the 2. deild karla. The following season, Þróttur went undefeated through the regular season and playoffs, winning the league and achieving promotion to the second-tier 1. deild karla.

==== Notable players ====
Note: Flags indicate national team eligibility at FIBA-sanctioned events. Players may hold other non-FIBA nationalities not displayed.

Criteria

To appear in this section a player must have either:

- Set a club record or won an individual award while at the club
- Played at least one official international match for their national team at any time
- Played at least one official NBA match at any time.

- (Iceland) Daníel Guðni Guðmundsson
- (Iceland) Gunnar Einarsson
- (Iceland) Hjörtur Harðarson

==== Honors ====
- 2. deild karla:
  - Winners: 2007, 2023

== Football ==
Þróttur V.
- Ground: Vogabæjarvöllur, Vogar, Iceland
- Manager: Gunnar Júlíus Helgason
- League: 2. deild karla
- 2025: 2. deild karla, 3rd of 12
Home colours	Away colours

=== Men's football ===
In 2017, the men's football team finished second in the 3. deild karla and was promoted to the third tier of Icelandic football for the first time in the club's history. In July 2020, the team hired former Icelandic international player Hermann Hreiðarsson as its manager. Later that month, former English international player David James served as an assistant for Hermann during one game.

=== Honors ===
- 3. deild karla:
  - Runner-up: 2017

=== Current squad ===
As of 26 July 2025

Note: Flags indicate national team as defined under FIFA eligibility rules; some limited exceptions apply. Players may hold more than one non-FIFA nationality.

No.	Pos.	Nation	Player
—	GK	ISL	Rökkvi Rafn Agnesarson
—	MF	ISL	Sigurður Agnar Arnþórsson
—	MF	ISL	Auðun Gauti Auðunsson
—	DF	ISL	Jóhannes Karl Bárðarson
—	GK	ISL	Jökull Blǣngsson
—	MF	ISL	Ólafur Örn Eyjólfsson
—	FW	ISL	Rúnar Ingi Eysteinsson
—	MF	ISL	Birgir Halldórsson
—	MF	ISL	Franz Bergmann Heimisson
—	DF	ISL	Hilmar Starri Hilmarsson
—	MF	ISL	Jón Jökull Hjaltason

No.	Pos.	Nation	Player
—	MF	ISL	Jón Kristinn Ingason
—	MF	ISL	Jón Veigar Kristjánsson
—	MF	ISL	Ásgeir Marteinsson
—	MF	ISL	Mikhael Kári Olamide Banjoko
—	FW	ISL	Euþór Orri Ómarsson
—	DF	ISL	Hrein Ingi Örnólfsson
—	MF	ISL	Anton Breki Óskarsson
—	DF	UKR	Kostyantyn Pikul
—	MF	ISL	Guðni Sigþórsson
—	MF	ISL	Almar Máni Þórisson
