= Ásvellir =

Sports venue in Hafnarfjörður, Iceland

Coordinates: 64.0522555°N 21.9693009°W

- Interactive map of Ásvellir
- Location: Hafnarfjörður, Iceland
- Owner: Hafnarfjörður
- Capacity: 2,120
- Type: Sport venue
- Surface: Grass

Construction
- Built: 1999
- Opened: 2000
- Renovated: 2014
- Expanded: 2018

Tenant
- Haukar men's football; Haukar men's basketball; Haukar women's basketball; Haukar Handball; KÁ

Ásvellir (Icelandic pronunciation: [ˈausˌvɛtlɪr̥]) is a sports venue in Hafnarfjörður, Iceland with a gym, pool, basketball court and football field.

Two decades ago in 1996 a company and the Hafnarfjörður council signed an agreement to subsidize the construction of the complex. Finished in 1999, it started to host tournaments in 2000.

== Refurbishment ==
In 2014, the Ásvellir gym part was refurbished by polishing the gym surface, grinding up the floor and inserting the lines again. Its roof began to leak in October 2016 seeing that there was a storm.

== Ólafssalur ==
In 2018, a new basketball court in the Ásvellir area was opened. It was named Ólafssalur, in memory of Ólafur Rafnsson, former president of FIBA Europe. Ólafssalur has a capacity of 700.
