= Vogar =

Vogar Vogar
- Town
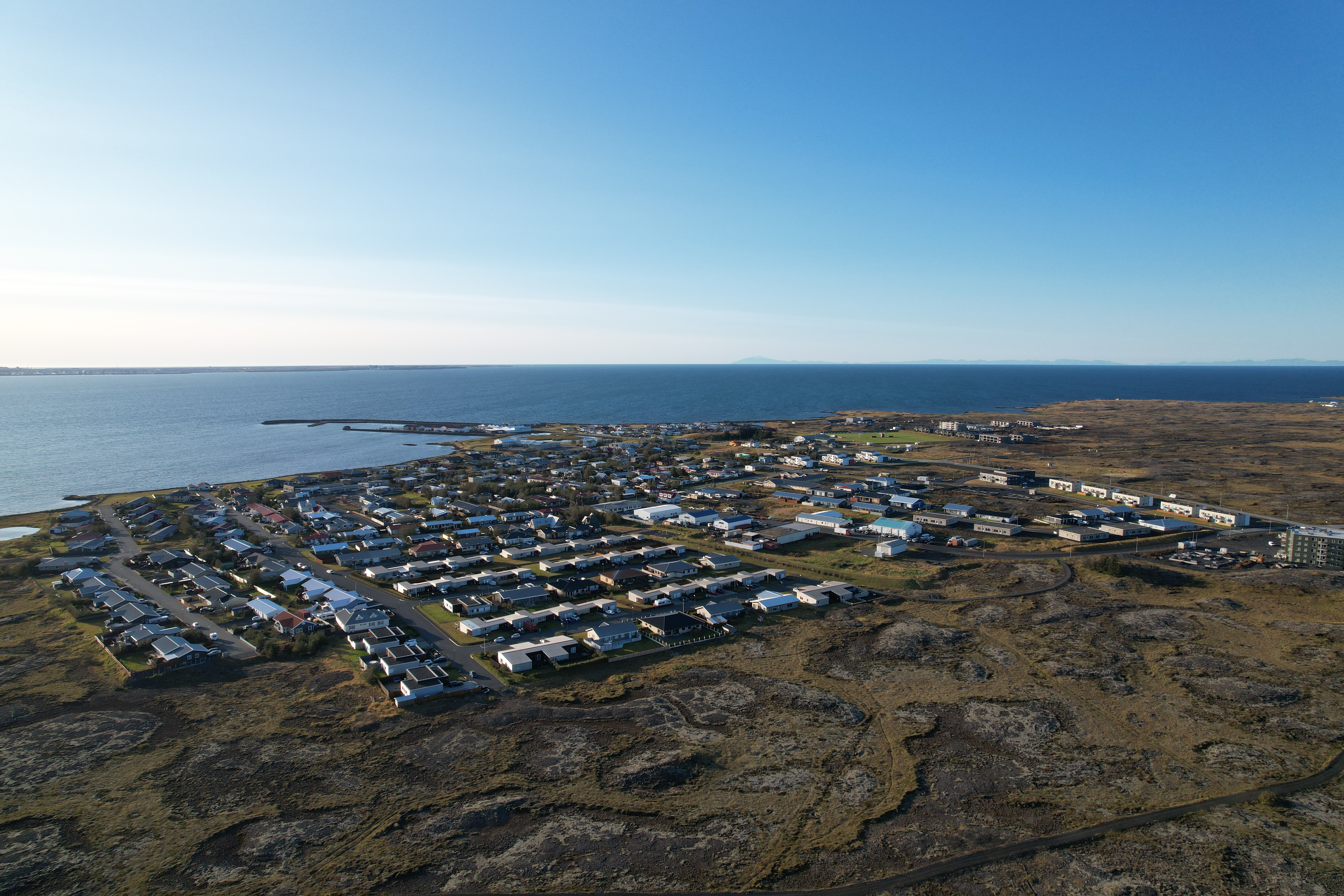
- Vogar

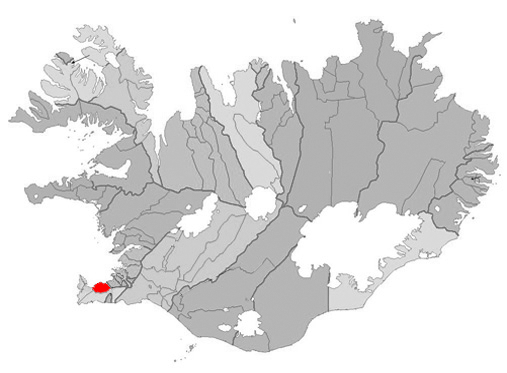
- Location of the Municipality of Vogar

- Location in Iceland
- Coordinates: 63°58′N 22°22′W
- Country: Iceland
- Constituency: South Constituency
- Region: Southern Peninsula
- Municipality: Vogar

Government
  - President of the town council: Björn G. Sæbjörnsson

Population (2021)
  - Total: 1,331
- Time zone: UTC+0 (GMT)

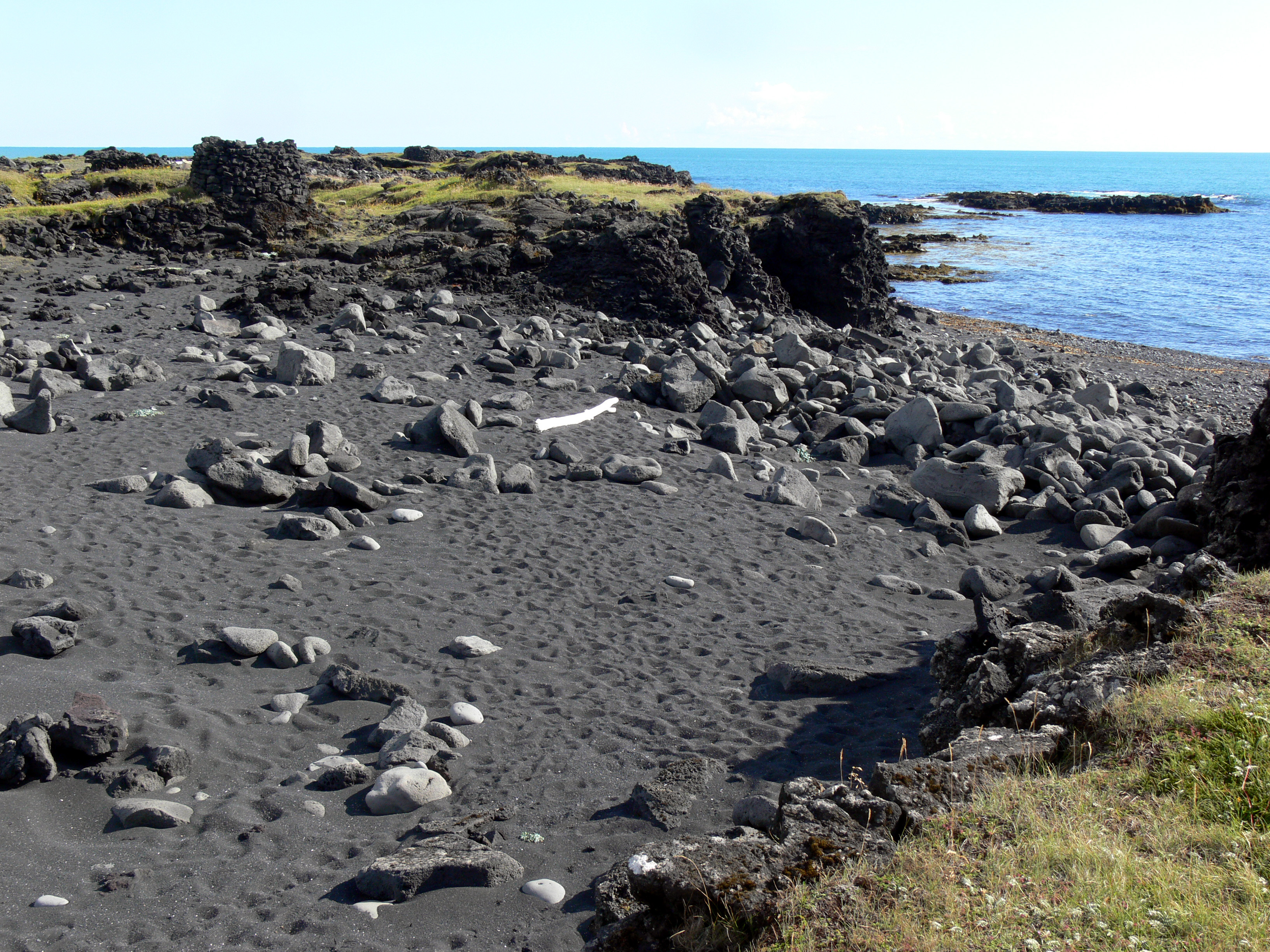
Selatangar

Vogar (Icelandic pronunciation: [ˈvɔːɣar̥]) is a small town in the southwest of Iceland. It is the seat of the municipality of Vogar (Sveitarfélagið Vogar). There is a highly automated atmospheric gas extraction plant in the town, with the oxygen produced being the only local source for Iceland's healthcare use. The town also has a fish roe incubation centre for Atlantic salmon.

== Overview ==
The population of the municipality of Vogar was almost 1400 as of 2023.

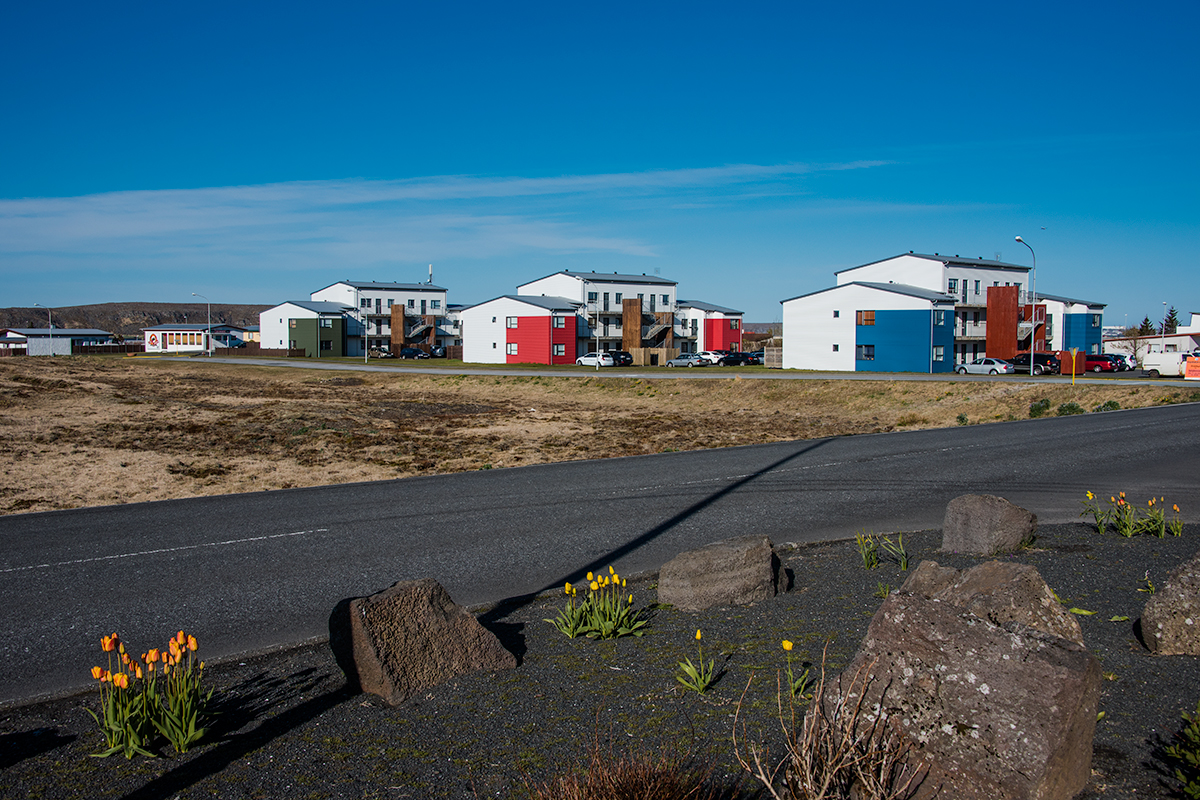
Vogar Reykjanes
