= Ungmennafélagið Afturelding =

Icelandic association football club

Afturelding
- Full name: Ungmennafélagið Afturelding
- Founded: 11 April 1909; 117 years ago
- Ground: Varmárvollur, Mosfellsbær
- Capacity: 2500
- Chairman: Tryggvi Willumsson
- Manager: Magnús Már Einarsson
- League: 1. deild karla
- 2025: Besta deild karla, 12th of 12 (relegated)
Home colours	Away colours

Ungmennafélagið Afturelding (Icelandic pronunciation: [ˈuŋkˌmɛnːaˌfjɛːˌlaijɪð ˈaftʏrˌɛltiŋk], lit. 'Dawn Youth Club' (Note: Ungmennafélagið is the definite form of Ungmennafélag, meaning "the youth club".)), commonly known as Afturelding or UMFA, is a professional Icelandic multi-sports club from the town of Mosfellsbær located just north of the capital Reykjavík. The club was founded in 1909 and today is primarily known for its handball, football and volleyball teams.

== Football ==
The team plays their home games at artificial pitch Varmárvöllur in Mosfellsbær. The club played previously on a grass pitch at Varmárvöllur but since 2018 all home games have been on the artificial pitch. The club also has large grass training ground at Tungubakkar.

=== Men's football ===
==== History ====
In 2005, the club signed future national team goalkeeper Hannes Þór Halldórsson.

In 2007, former Manchester United reserve player Aaron Burns played two games for Afturelding and scored one goal before returning to England.

Afturelding got promoted to the first deild in 2008 but got relegated again in 2009. In 2012, Afturelding finished number five in 2. deild after having a chance of getting promoted before the last round of the league. The team also had a decent cup run which ended when Afturelding lost 3–2 against premier league club Fram at Varmárvöllur. After ten years in 2. deild Afturelding got promoted again by winning the 2. deild in 2018. In 2019 the team finished number eight in the 1. division.

==== Titles ====
- 2. deild karla: 2018
- 3. deild karla: 1986, 1999

==== Notable players ====
- (Iceland) Hannes Þór Halldórsson
- (Iceland) Helgi Sigurðsson

==== Current squad ====
As of 10 August 2026

Note: Flags indicate national team as defined under FIFA eligibility rules; some limited exceptions apply. Players may hold more than one non-FIFA nationality.

No.	Pos.	Nation	Player
2	MF	ISL	Birkir Már Sævarsson
3	DF	ISL	Axel Óskar Andrésson
4	DF	ISL	Gunnar Bergmann Sigmarsson
5	MF	ISL	Jón Vignir Pétursson
6	DF	ISL	Aron Elí Sævarsson
7	MF	ISL	Kristinn Freyr Sigurðsson
8	MF	NED	Bart Kooistra
9	FW	NOR	Joacim Holtan
10	MF	ISL	Elmar Kári Enesson Čogić
11	FW	ISL	Óðinn Bjarkason
12	GK	ISL	Arnar Dadi Jóhannesson
14	DF	ISL	Daníel Darri Þorkelsson

No.	Pos.	Nation	Player
16	FW	ISL	Bjartur Bjarmi Barkarson
17	DF	ISL	Haukur Örn Brink (On loan from Stjarnan)
19	DF	ISL	Sævar Atli Hugason
22	DF	ISL	Rikharður Smári Gröndal
24	MF	ISL	Trausti Þráinsson
25	MF	ISL	Georg Bjarnason
27	DF	ISL	Enes Þór Enesson Čogić
29	GK	ISL	Þórður Ingason
33	DF	ISL	Andi Hoti (On loan from Valur)
79	FW	ISL	Róbert Agnar Daðason
85	GK	ISL	Kristján Hjörvar Sigurkarlsson

=== Out on loan ===
Note: Flags indicate national team as defined under FIFA eligibility rules; some limited exceptions apply. Players may hold more than one non-FIFA nationality.

No.	Pos.	Nation	Player
—	MF	ISL	Júlíus Valdimar Guðjónsson (at Hvíti until 31 January 2027)

=== Women's football ===
As of the 2018 season, Afturelding fields a joint team with Fram in the 1. deild kvenna. In September 2021, the team was promoted to the top-tier Besta-deild kvenna after finishing second in the 1. deild kvenna. In April 2022, former Afturelding player and singer Guðrún Jóhannesdóttir, known by her stage name GDRN, signed a 3-year deal to become one of Afturelding women's team primary sponsors.

==== Titles ====
- 1. deild kvenna: 1995

==== Notable players ====
- (Iceland) Cecilía Rán Rúnarsdóttir
- (Iceland) Guðrún Jóhannesdóttir
- (Iceland) Mist Edvardsdóttir
- (United States) Brittany Matthews
- (United States) Jade Gentile

== Handball ==
=== Men's handball ===
Afturelding's men's handball team won its only national championship in 1999.

==== Titles ====
- Icelandic champions: 1999
- 1. deild karla: 1952, 1955, 1959, 1993, 2007, 2014
- 2. deild karla: 1985

=== Women's handball ===
As of the 2018–2019 season, Afturelding women's team plays in the second-tier 1. deild kvenna.

== Volleyball ==
=== Men's volleyball ===
==== Titles ====
- Icelandic Cup: 2017

=== Women's volleyball ===
Afturelding women's team advanced to the Úrvalsdeild finals for the first time in 2012. It won the national championship in 2012, 2014 and 2016.

==== Titles ====
- Icelandic champions: 2012, 2014, 2016
- Icelandic Cup: 2015, 2016, 2017
