= Mosfellsbær =

Coordinates: 64.17°N 21.72°W

- Municipality
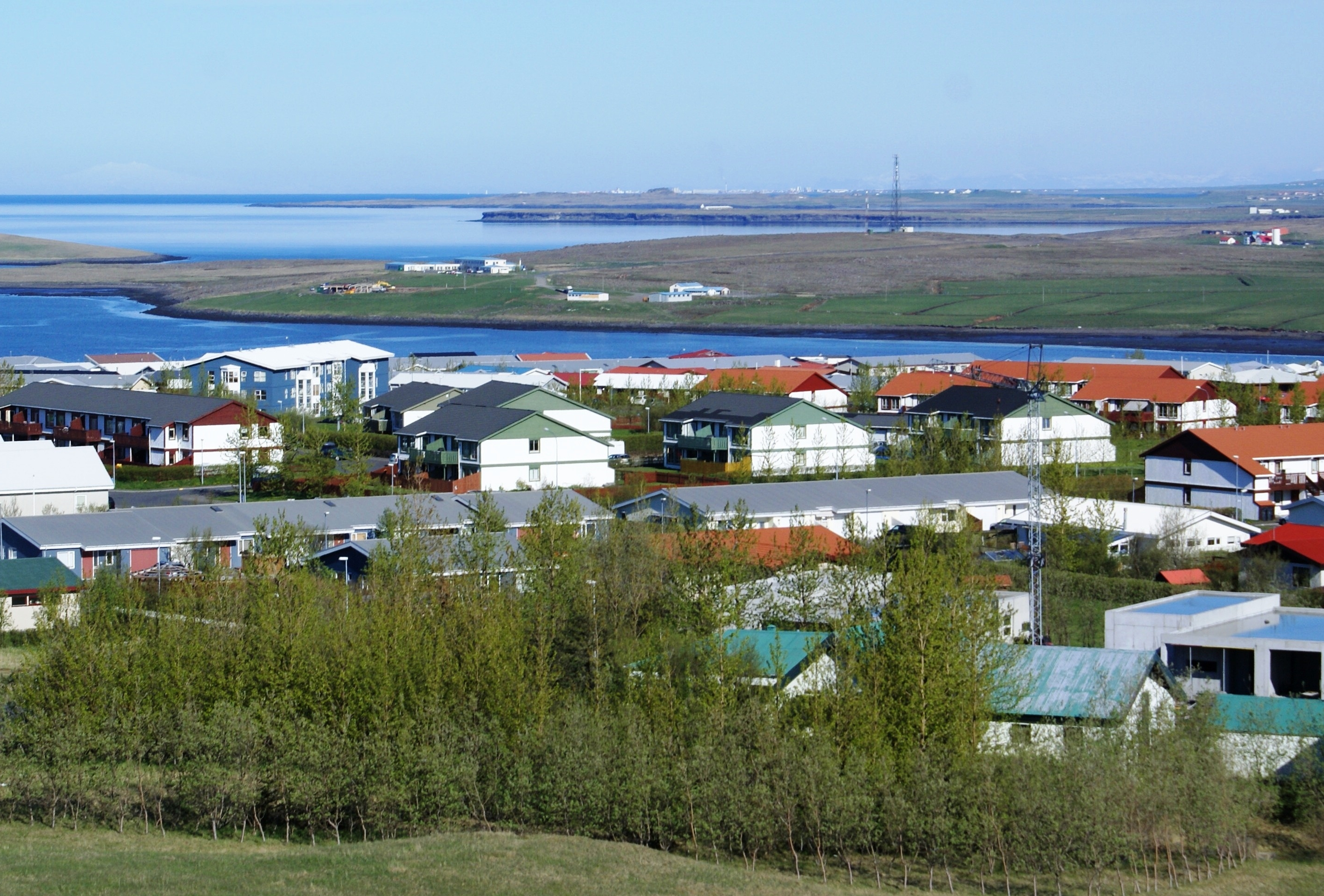
- Mosfellsbær

- Coat of arms

- Location of Mosfellsbær

- Location within Iceland
- Country: Iceland
- Region: Capital Region
- Constituency: Southwest Constituency

Government
  - Mayor: Regína Ásvaldsdóttir

Area
  - Total: 186 km^{2} (72 sq mi)

Population (2025)
  - Total: 13,715
  - Density: 73.7/km^{2} (191/sq mi)
- Postal code(s): 270, 271, 276
- Municipal number: 1604
- Website: mos.is

Mosfellsbær (Icelandic pronunciation: [ˈmɔːsˌfɛlsˌpaiːr̥], colloquially Mosó) is a town in south-west Iceland, 12 kilometres (7 miles) east of the country's capital, Reykjavík. The coat of arms of the municipality is a tightly-knotted triquetra, a symbol often used in Celtic knotwork and strongly associated with the Celtic nations (which featured prominently in Celtic spirituality as well as Ancient Celtic religion in the past and, to some extent, to this day). The coat of arms might denote the Gaelic heritage of Mosfellsbær as Icelanders are also descended from Gaelic-speaking settlers who voyaged or were brought by the Norsemen in Iceland during the country's settlement in the Viking Age.

== Notable people ==
- Ólafía Jóhannsdóttir (1863-1924), educator, activist, writer
- Ólafur Arnalds (born 1986), musician
- Greta Salóme (born 1986), singer, songwriter, violinist
- Axel Óskar Andrésson (born 1998), footballer
- Jökull Andrésson (born 2001), footballer
- KALEO (2012-present), Blues rock band

== Twin towns – sister cities ==
Mosfellsbær is twinned with:

- Loimaa, Finland
- Skien, Norway
- Thisted, Denmark
- Uddevalla, Sweden

== Transport ==
Mosfellsbær is connected to the bus network of Strætó. Also the Borgarlína network, a BRT-system connecting Reykjavik and surrounding area, is under construction.
