= 2025 Icelandic Men's Football Cup =

2025 Icelandic Cup
Icelandic Cup - Mjólkurbikarinn

Tournament details
- Country: Iceland
- Teams: 74

Final positions
- Champions: Vestri
- Runners-up: Valur

Tournament statistics
- Matches played: 60
- Goals scored: 294 (4.9 per match)
- Top goal scorer(s): Dagur Orri Garðarsson; Thor Thordarson; Hektor Gardarsson (4 goals)
- All statistics correct as of 19 April 2025.

The 2025 Icelandic Cup, also known as Mjólkurbikarinn ("The Milk Cup") for sponsorship reasons, was the 66th edition of the Icelandic national football cup. The winners qualified for the 2026–27 Europa League first qualifying round. KA were the defending champions.

== First round ==
47 clubs from Tier 3 and below, and 1 team from the 2025 1. deild karla (Völsungur) entered the first round. Five clubs from the men's 2nd division, 2025 2. deild karla (Grótta, Höttur/Huginn, KFA, Þróttur Vogum, Víkingur Ólafsvík) received byes.

The match between Alftanes and Haukar, played on 30 March, was stopped at 0–3 after half-time due to bad weather. A possible resume of this game was scheduled for 31 March. However the tournament direction decided that the result would stand, Haukar winning 0–3 away and advancing to the next round.

Team 1	Score	Team 2
28 March 2025
BF 108	8–0	Afríka
Léttir	1–2	Kría
Vængir Júpiters	1–2	KÁ Ásvellir
Úlfarnir	3–0	Stokkseyri
KFK Kópavogur	1–5	Elliði
SR	2–3	KFR
Árborg	0–4	Augnablik
Ýmir	3–4	Hafnir
29 March 2025
Ægir	2–3 (a.e.t.)	KV
Spyrnir	5–0	Neisti
ÍH	4–1	KH
Smári	4–0	Fálkar
KF	3–5	Tindastóll
Kári	7–1	KFS
Víðir	2–0	Hörður
KFG	2–3	Reynir S.
Einherji	0–2	Sindri
IBU	0–6	Hvíti Riddarinn
Árbær	4–1	Þorlákur
30 March 2025
Hamar	1–3 (a.e.t.)	Skallagrímur
Magni	4–2 (a.e.t.)	Kormákur/Hvöt
Álafoss	3–4	RB
Álftanes	0–3	Haukar
1 April 2025
Völsungur	4–2	Dalvík/Reynir

== Second round ==
The 24 first round winners, the five teams given first round byes, and the 11 remaining teams from the 2025 1. deild karla entered the second round.

Team 1	Score	Team 2
3 April 2025
Elliði	1–3	Haukar
HK	4–0	Hvíti Riddarinn
Þór Akureyri	7–0	Magni
4 April 2025
Reynir S.	0–5	Grindavík
Kári	8–1	Árbær
5 April 2025
KÁ Ásvellir	3–2 (a.e.t.)	KFR
KFA	3–0	Spyrnir
KV	1–6	Fylkir
Þróttur Reykjavík	7–0	Hafnir
Skallagrímur	1–1 (3–5 p)	Úlfarnir
6 April 2025
Höttur/Huginn	1–0	Sindri
Keflavík	6–0	Þróttur Vogum
Leiknir Reykjavík	5–0	Kría
9 April 2025
Víkingur Ólafsvík	5–1	Smári
10 April 2025
ÍH	2–5	Selfoss
11 April 2025
Njarðvík	5–0	BF 108
Grótta	2–1	Víðir
Augnablik	0–5	ÍR
12 April 2025
Tindastóll	1–1 (6–7 p)	Völsungur
14 April 2025
RB	0–4	Fjölnir

== Round of 32 ==
The 20 second round winners and the 12 teams from the 2025 Besta deild karla entered the Round of 32.

Team 1	Score	Team 2
17 April 2025
Afturelding	5–0	Höttur/Huginn
Kári	2–1	Fylkir
Keflavík	1–0	Leiknir Reykjavík
Víkingur Ólafsvík	7–1	Úlfarnir
ÍBV	3–0	Víkingur Reykjavík
18 April 2025
Grótta	1–4	ÍA
Selfoss	4–0	Haukar
Völsungur	2–3 (a.e.t.)	Þróttur Reykjavík
Breiðablik	5–0	Fjölnir
Stjarnan	5–3 (a.e.t.)	Njarðvík
Vestri	3–3 (5–4 p)	HK
KA	4–0	KFA
19 April 2025
Grindavík	1–3	Valur
KR	11–0	KÁ Ásvellir
Þór Akureyri	3–1	ÍR
Fram	1–0	FH

== Round of 16 ==
The 16 Round of 32 winners entered the Round of 16.

Team 1	Score	Team 2
13 May 2025
Selfoss	1–4	Þór Akureyri
14 May 2025
ÍA	0–1	Afturelding
Keflavík	5–2	Víkingur Ólafsvík
KR	2–4	ÍBV
Valur	2–1	Þróttur Reykjavík
Kári	2–2 (1–4 p)	Stjarnan
15 May 2025
KA	2–4	Fram
Breiðablik	1–2	Vestri

== Quarter-finals ==
The 8 Round of 16 winners entered the quarter-finals.

Team 1	Score	Team 2
18 June 2025
Vestri	2–0	Þór Akureyri
Stjarnan	4–2	Keflavík
19 June 2025
ÍBV	0–1	Valur
Afturelding	0–1	Fram

== Semi-finals ==
The 4 quarter-final winners entered the semi-finals.

Team 1	Score	Team 2
1 July 2025
Valur	3–1	Stjarnan
12 July 2025
Vestri	0–0 (5–3 p)	Fram

== Final ==
The final was held between the two semi-final winners.

22 August 2025
19:00

Valur	0–1	Vestri
		Pedersen 24'

Laugardalsvöllur, Reykjavík
Attendance: 3.979
Referee: Sigurður Hjörtur Þrastarson
