= 2020 3. deild karla =

3. deild karla
- Season: 2020

The 2020 3. deild karla (English: Men's First Division) is the 66th season of fourth-tier Icelandic football. Twelve teams contested the league. The season began on 18 June.

== Teams ==
Team	Location	Stadium
Augnablik	Kópavogur	Fagrilundur
Einherji	Vopnafjörður	Vopnafjarðarvöllur
Elliði	Reykjavík	Fylkisvöllur
Höttur / Huginn	Egilsstaðir	Vilhjálmsvöllur
KFG	Garðabær	Stjörnuvöllur
KV	Reykjavík	KV-Park við Frostaskjól
Reynir Sandgerði	Sandgerði	Sandgerðisvöllur
Sindri	Höfn	Sindravellir
Tindastóll	Sauðárkrókur	Sauðárkróksvöllur
Vængir Júpiters	Grafarvogur	Fjölnisvöllur
Álftanes	Álftanes	Bessastaðavöllur
Ægir	Þorlákshöfn	Þorlákshafnarvöllur

== League table ==
Pos	Team	Pld	W	D	L	GF	GA	GD	Pts	Qualification or relegation
1	KV	20	15	1	4	62	30	+32	46	Promotion to 2020 2. deild karla
2	Reynir	20	13	3	4	62	41	+21	42	Promotion to 2020 2. deild karla
3	KFG	20	9	4	7	39	33	+6	31	
4	Augnablik	20	8	6	6	42	39	+3	30	
5	Sindri	19	8	4	7	37	42	−5	28	
6	Elliði	20	7	4	9	36	40	−4	25	
7	Tindastóll	20	6	7	7	39	46	−7	25	
8	Ægir	20	6	6	8	34	39	−5	24	
9	Einherji	20	7	2	11	39	53	−14	23	
10	Höttur/Huginn	20	6	3	11	29	35	−6	21	
11	Vængir Júpiters	19	5	4	10	24	36	−12	19	Relegation to 2020 4. deild karla
12	Álftanes	20	5	4	11	32	41	−9	19	Relegation to 2020 4. deild karla

Source: Soccerway
Rules for classification: 1) Points won; 2) Total goal difference; 3) Total goals scored; 4) Points in head-to-head matches; 5) Goal difference in h-t-h matches; 6) Goals scored in h-t-h matches; 7) Away goals in h-t-h matches; 8) Draw.

== Results ==
Each team will play home and away once against every other team for a total of 22 games each.

Home \ Away	AUG	EIN	ELL	HÖT	KFG	KV	REY	SIN	TIN	VÆN	ÁLF	ÆGI
Augnablik	—	2–2		4–3	2–3			2–2				
Einherji		—					2–3			1–2	3–2	
Elliði		6–1	—				2–2					
Höttur/Huginn		1–2	2–1	—						0–2		
KFG		1–3			—							3–4
KV						—	3–4			5–1	2–1	3–1
Reynir	1–0			3–1	2–1		—					
Sindri			2–0		1–4	2–1		—				4–2
Tindastóll			3–1	2–2	1–3			4–3	—			
Vængir Júpiters	0–0						1–1		1–2	—		
Álftanes			0–0					1–1	1–2		—	
Ægir			1–3						1–1	2–0	1–2	—

Updated to match(es) played on 22 July 2020. Source: Soccerway
Legend: Blue = home team win; Yellow = draw; Red = away team win.
