= List of football clubs in Iceland =

The following list contains the 74 football clubs playing in the Icelandic football league system.

== League clubs 2025 ==
=== Úrvalsdeild ===
Club	Location	Founded	Ground
Afturelding	Mosfellsbær	1909	Varmárvöllur
Breiðablik	Kópavogur	1950	Kópavogsvöllur
FH	Hafnarfjörður	1929	Kaplakrikavöllur
Fram	Reykjavík	1908	Framvöllur
ÍA	Akranes	1946	Akranesvöllur
ÍBV	Vestmannaeyjar	1903	Hásteinsvöllur
KA	Akureyri	1928	Akureyrarvöllur
KR	Reykjavík	1899	KR-völlur
Stjarnan	Garðabær	1960	Stjörnuvöllur
Valur	Reykjavík	1911	Hlíðarendi
Vestri	Bolungarvík	2006	Torfnesvöllur
Víkingur R.	Reykjavík	1908	Víkingsvöllur

=== 1. deild karla ===
Club	Location	Founded	Ground
Fjölnir	Reykjavík	1988	Fjölnisvöllur
Fylkir	Reykjavík	1967	Fylkisvöllur
Grindavík	Grindavík	1935	Grindavíkurvöllur
HK	Kópavogur	1970	Kórinn
ÍR	Reykjavík	1907	Hertzvöllurinn
Keflavík	Keflavík	1929	Keflavíkurvöllur
Leiknir R.	Reykjavík	1973	Leiknisvöllur
Njarðvík	Njarðvík	1944	Rafholtsvöllur
Selfoss	Selfoss	1936	Selfossvöllur
Völsungur	Húsavík	1927	Húsavíkurvöllur
Þór	Akureyri	1915	Þórsvöllur
Þróttur R.	Reykjavík	1949	Valbjarnarvöllur

=== 2. deild karla ===
Club	Location	Founded	Ground
Dalvík/Reynir	Dalvík	2006	Dalvíkurvöllur
Grótta	Seltjarnarnes	1967	Gróttuvöllur
Haukar	Hafnarfjörður	1931	Schenkervöllurinn
Höttur	Egilsstaðir	1974	Vilhjálmsvöllur
Kári	Akranes	1922	Akranesvöllur
KFA	Fjarðabyggð	2022	Fjarðabyggðarhöllin
KFG	Garðabær	2008	Stjörnuvöllur
Kormákur/Hvöt	Blönduós	1969	Blönduósvöllur
Víðir	Garður	1936	Garðsvöllur
Víkingur Ó.	Ólafsvík	1928	Ólafsvíkurvöllur
Þróttur Vogum	Vogar	1932	Vogavöllur
Ægir	Þorlákshöfn	1987	Þorlákshafnarvöllur

=== 3. deild karla ===
Club	Location	Founded	Ground
Árbær	Reykjavík (Árbær)		Fylkisvöllur
Augnablik	Kópavogur	2005	Versalavöllur
Hvíti Riddarinn	Mosfellsbær	1998	Tungubakkavöllur
ÍH	Hafnarfjörður	1983	Kaplakrikavöllur
KF	Ólafsfjörður	2011	Ólafsfjarðarvöllur
KFK	Kópavogur		Fagrilundur Gervigras
KV	Reykjavík	2004	KR-völlur
Magni	Grenivík	1915	Grenivíkurvöllur
Reynir Sandgerði	Sandgerði	1935	Sandgerðisvöllur
Sindri	Höfn	1934	Sindrivellir
Tindastóll	Sauðárkrókur	1907	Sauðárkróksvöllur
Ýmir	Kópavogur		Versalavöllur

=== 4. deild karla ===
Club	Location	Founded	Ground
Álftanes	Álftanes	1946	Bessastaðavöllur
Árborg	Selfoss	2000	Selfossvöllur
Elliði	Reykjavík	2013	Fylkisvöllur
Hafnir	Hafnir		
Hamar	Hveragerði	1992	Grýluvöllur
KÁ	Hafnarfjörður		Ásvellir
KFS	Vestmannaeyjar	1997	Helgafellsvöllur
KH	Hlíðarendi	2011	N1-völlurinn
Kría	Seltjarnarnes	2014	Vivaldivöllurinn
Vængir Júpiters	Reykjavík	2010	Egilshöll

=== 5. deild karla ===
Group A

Club	Location	Founded	Ground
Álafoss	Mosfellsbær		Tungubakkavöllur
Hörður Í.	Ísafjörður	2015	Torfnesvöllur
ÍBU Uppsveitir	Flúðir	2020	Flúðavöllurinn
KM	Reykjavík	2013	Kórinn
Léttir	Reykjavík	1979	Hertzvöllurinn
Reynir H	Hellissandur		
Skallagrímur	Borgarnes	1916	Skallagrímsvöllur
Smári	Varmahlíð	2020	

Group B

Club	Location	Founded	Ground
BF 108			
KFR	Hvolsvöllur	1997	Hvolsvöllur
RB	Keflavik		
Spyrnir	Fellabær	2008	Fellavöllur
SR	Reykjavík	2015	Gervigrasvöllur Laugardal
Stokkseyri	Stokkseyri	1908	Stokkseyrarvöllur
Úlfarnir	Reykjavík		Framvöllur
Þorlákur	Garðabær		
