= 2016 Icelandic Cup =

Borgunarbikar

Tournament details
- Country: Iceland
- Teams: 52

Final positions
- Champions: Valur
- Runners-up: ÍBV

Tournament statistics
- Matches played: 47
- Goals scored: 179 (3.81 per match)
- Top goal scorer(s): Karel Sigurðsson (7 goals)

The 2016 Icelandic Cup, also known as Borgunarbikar for sponsorship reasons, was the 57th edition of the Icelandic national football cup. Valur won the title.

== Calendar ==
Below are the dates for each round as given by the official schedule:

Round	Main date	Number of fixtures	Clubs
First Round	27 April–3 May 2016	23	46 → 23
Second Round	1–11 May 2016	20	40 → 20
Third Round	25–26 May 2016	16	32 → 16
Fourth Round	8–9 June 2016	8	16 → 8
Quarter-finals	3–5 July 2016	4	8 → 4
Semi-finals	27–28 July 2016	2	4 → 2
Final	13 August 2016	1	2 → 1

== First round ==
Team 1	Score	Team 2
27 April 2016
KH	8–0	Snæfell
29 April 2016
KFG	2–0	Ægir
30 April 2016
Vængir Júpíters	1–0	Mídas
Ýmir	0–4	Örninn
Kría	2–0	Hörður
Þróttur Vogum	2–1 (a.e.t.)	Stál-úlfur
Víðir	1–0	ÍH
Hvíti riddarinn	6–2	Gnúpverjar
GG Grindavík	1–2	KFS
Leiknir Fáskrúðsfirði	1–3	UMF Sindri Höfn
Höttur Egilsstöðum	2–0	Einherji
Völsungur	1–0	Nökkvi
Dalvík/Reynir	0–2 (a.e.t.)	UMF Tindastóll
Stokkseyri	1–6	Skallagrímur
Kóngarnir	0–2	KFR
Augnablik	2–0	Árborg
Kári	1–2	Njarðvík
Magni	15–0	Hamrarnir/Vinir
1 May 2016
Ísbjörninn	1–4	KB
Álftanes	0–1	Reynir Sandgerði
Vatnaliljur	1–2 (a.e.t.)	Hamar
Léttir	3–0 Awarded	UMF Kjalnesingar
3 May 2016
Berserkir	15–0	Afríka

27 April 2016	KH	8–0	Snæfell	Hlíðarendi, Reykjavík
20:30 CET	Ellert Finnbogi Eiríksson 7'; Atli Sigurðsson 11', 18', 40', 45'; Alexander Lúðvígsson 16'; Jóhann Helgi Gunnarsson 38'; Felix Hjálmarsson 90+1'			Referee: Gunnar Helgason

29 April 2016	KFG	2–0	Ægir	Stjörnuvöllur, Garðabær
23:00 CET	Bjarni Pálmason 5'; Daði Kristjánsson 89'			Referee: Sigurður Óli Þórleifsson

30 April 2016	Ýmir	0–4	Örninn	Kórinn, Kópavogur
14:00 CET			Sindri Þór Sigurðsson 4', 18'; Ásbjörn Björnsson 28'; Hrannar Bogi Jónsson 82'	Referee: Sigurður Ingi Magnússon

30 April 2016	Kría	2–0	Hörður	Vivaldivöllurinn, Seltjarnarnes
15:30 CET	Garðar Guðnason 85' (pen.), 90+6'			Referee: Elías Ingi Árnason

30 April 2016	GG Grindavík	1–2	KFS	Grindavíkurvöllur, Grindavík
16:00 CET	Ray Anthony Jónsson 75'		Gauti Þorvarðarson 45'; Vilmundur Þór Jónasson 83' (o.g.)	Referee: Einar Ingi Jóhannsson

30 April 2016	Höttur Egilsstöðum	2–0	Einherji	Fellavöllur, Fellabær
16:00 CET	Elvar Þór Ægisson 16' (pen.); Steinar Aron Magnússon 49'

30 April 2016	Dalvík/Reynir	0–2 (a.e.t.)	UMF Tindastóll	KA-völlur, Akureyri
16:00 CET			Ágúst Friðjónsson 110'; Arnar Skúli Atlason 120' (pen.)	Referee: Vilhelm Adolfsson

30 April 2016	Hvíti riddarinn	6–2	Gnúpverjar	Tungubakkavöllur, Mosfellsbær
16:00 CET	Haukur Eyþórsson 23', 68'; Hörður Steinar Harðarson 30', 75'; Guðmundur Kristinn Pálsson 78'; Arnór Þrastarson 88'		Ívar Guðmundsson 12' (pen.) ? 55' (o.g.)	Referee: Þórður Már Gylfason

30 April 2016	Leiknir Fáskrúðsfirði	1–3	UMF Sindri Höfn	Fjarðabyggðarhöllin, Reyðarfjörður
16:00 CET	Hilmar Freyr Bjartþórsson 34'		Duje Klaric 18'; Kristinn Justiniano Snjólfsson 40', 71'	Referee: Tómas Orri Hreinsson

30 April 2016	Stokkseyrar	1–6	Skallagrímur	JÁVERK-völlurinn, Selfoss
16:00 CET	Eyþór Gunnarsson 55'		Sölvi G Gylfason 8'; Leifur Guðjónsson 26'; Richard Már Guðbrandsson 29'; Viktor Ingi Jakobsson 62', 67' (pen.); Enok Ingþórsson 90+1'	Referee: Gunnþór Steinar Jónsson

30 April 2016	Þróttur Vogum	2–1 (a.e.t.)	Stál-úlfur	Vogabæjarvöllur, Vogar
16:00 CET	Kristinn Aron Hjartarson 74'; Aron Elfar Jónsson 92'		Rúben Filipe Vasques Narciso 46'	Referee: Jóhannes Elíasson

30 April 2016	Víðir	1–0	ÍH	Nesfisk-völlurinn, Garður
16:00 CET	Helgi Þór Jónsson 49'			Referee: Óli Njáll Ingólfsson

30 April 2016	Völsungur	1–0	Nökkvi	Húsavíkurvöllur, Húsavík
16:00 CET	Jóhann Þórhallsson 66'			Referee: Jóhannes Elíasson

30 April 2016	Kóngarnir	0–2	KFR	Leiknisvöllur, Reykjavík
17:00 CET			Þormar Elvarsson 29'; Jón Freyr Ásmundsson 41'	Referee: Svanlaugur Þorsteinsson

30 April 2016	Augnablik	2–0	Árborg	Fagrilundur, Kópavogur
17:30 CET	Hreinn Bergs 22', 88'			Referee: Helgi Mikael Jónasson

30 April 2016	Kári	1–2	UMF Njarðvík	Akraneshöllin, Akranes
18:00 CET	Tryggvi Hrafn Haraldsson 47' (pen.)		Harrison Hanley 27', 88'	Referee: Örvar Sær Gíslason

30 April 2016	Magni	15–0	Hamrarnir/Vinir	KA-völlur, Akureyri
18:30 CET	Orri Freyr Hjaltalín 3', 28', 56', 74'; Jóhann Örn Sigurjónsson 17', 25', 65', 68'; Númi Kárason 39', 53'; Kristinn Þór Rósbergsson 43', 45+1', 70'; Hreggviður Heiðberg Gunnarsson 83'; Lars Óli Jessen 90'			Referee: Sverrir Gunnar Pálmason

1 May 2016	Ísbjörninn	1–4	KB	Kórinn, Kópavogur
14:00 CET	Bjarni Jóhannsson 33'		Ólafur Davíð Pétursson 2'; Aron Daníelsson 17'; Halldór Hilmar Sigurðsson 77'; Chalee Mohtua 81'	Referee: Hjalti Þór Halldórsson

1 May 2016	Vatnaliljur	1–2 (a.e.t.)	Hamar	Fagrilundur, Kópavogur
15:00 CET	Reynir Örn Harðarson 7'		Páll Pálmason 30'; Liam John Michael Killa 13'	Referee: Gylfi Tryggvason

1 May 2016	Álftanes	0–1	Reynir Sandgerði	Bessastaðavöllur, Álftanes
15:00 CET			Sindri Lars Ómarsson 47'	Referee: Garðar Örn Hinriksson

1 May 2016	Léttir	3–0 w/o	UMF Kjalnesingar
15:00 CET

3 May 2016	Berserkir	15–0	Afríka	Víkin, Reykjavík
22:00 CET	Einar Guðnason 7', 34', 61'; Kristján Andrésson 14' (pen.); Karel Sigurðsson 45', 47', 69', 82', 83', 87', 90'; Kormákur Marðarson 53'; Jason Már Bergsteinsson 75' (pen.); Jón Steinar Ágústsson 90+1'			Referee: Guðmundur Valgeirsson

== Second round ==
Team 1	Score	Team 2
1 May 2016
Vestri	4–0	KH
7 May 2016
KFG	9–1	KFS
9 May 2016
Kría	5–2	KB
10 May 2016
Fjarðabyggð	0–1	UMF Sindri Höfn
Fram Reykjavík	1–0	Afturelding
Haukar	4–0	KFR
Hvíti Riddarinn	0–1	HK
IF Höttur	0–1	Huginn
KA Akureyri	2–1 (a.e.t.)	UMF Tindastóll
Leiknir Reykjavík	8–0	Léttir
Örninn	0–1	Grindavík
Skallagrímur	0–2	Keflavík
Þór Akureyri	1–2	Völsungur
Þróttur Vogum	0–1	Grótta
UMF Selfoss	2–1	UMF Njardvik
KV	0–0 (a.e.t.) (4–2 p)	ÍR
11 May 2016
Hamar	1–4	Reynir Sandgerði
Vængir Júpiters	2–2 (a.e.t.) (3–5 p)	Augnablik
Víðir	4–0	Berserkir
Magni	2–2 (a.e.t.) (2–4 p)	Fjallabyggð

1 May 2016	Vestri	4–0	KH	Torfnesvöllur, Ísafjörður
16:30 CET	Hjalti Hermann Gíslason 26', 36'; Viktor Júlíusson 54'; Sergine Modou Fall 82'			Referee: Magnús Þór Jónsson

7 May 2016	KFG	9–1	KFS	Stjörnuvöllur, Garðabær
18:15 CET	Baldur Jónsson 6', 35', 51'; Bjarni Pálmason 16' (pen.), 65'; Aron Grétar Jafetsson 55', 67', 81', 88'		Kjartan Guðjónsson 52'	Referee: Gunnar Helgason

9 May 2016	Kría	5–2	KB	Vivaldivöllurinn, Seltjarnarnes
20:00 CET	Snæbjörn Ásgeirsson 41', 50'; Björn Orri Hermannsson 47'; Örn Þór Karlsson 64' (o.g.); Valtýr Bjarnason 88'		Kjartan Andri Baldvinsson 63'; Andri Stefánsson 62'	Referee: Gunnar Oddur Hafliðason

10 May 2016	Fjarðabyggð	0–1	UMF Sindri Höfn	Norðfjarðarvöllur, Neskaupstaður
21:00 CET			Kristinn Justiniano Snjólfsson 60' (pen.)	Referee: Helgi Mikael Jónasson

10 May 2016	Fram Reykjavík	1–0	Afturelding	Framvöllur Úlfarsárdal, Reykjavík
21:00 CET	Ingiberg Ólafur Jónsson 19'			Referee: Ívar Orri Kristjánsson

10 May 2016	Haukar	4–0	KFR	Ásvellir, Hafnarfjörður
21:00 CET	Þórður Jón Jóhannesson 8'; Fufura 15', 25', 39'			Referee: Frosti Viðar Gunnarsson

10 May 2016	Hvíti Riddarinn	0–1	HK	Tungubakkavöllur, Mosfellsbær
21:00 CET			Ingimar Elí Hlynsson 86'	Referee: Elías Ingi Árnason

10 May 2016	IF Höttur	0–1	Huginn	Fellavöllur, Fellabær
21:00 CET			Pétur Óskarsson 47'	Referee: Tómas Orri Hreinsson

10 May 2016	KA Akureyri	2–1 (a.e.t.)	UMF Tindastóll	KA-völlur, Akureyri
21:00 CET	Orri Gústafsson 65'; Almarr Ormarsson 108'		Ragnar Þór Gunnarsson 64'	Referee: Vilhelm Adolfsson

10 May 2016	Leiknir Reykjavík	8–0	Léttir	Egilshöll, Reykjavík
21:00 CET	Davi Wanderley Silva 32'; Kolbeinn Kárason 36' (pen.), 37', 72'; Kári Pétursson 63'; Atli Freyr Ottesen Pálsson 76'; Ólafur Hrannar Kristjánsson 76', 80'			Referee: Jóhann Gunnar Guðmundsson

== Round of 32 ==
Team 1	Score	Team 2
24 May 2016
Leiknir Reykjavík	3–2	KFG
Reynir Sandgerði	1–2 (a.e.t.)	Vestri
Grótta	6–1	Augnablik
Fram Reykjavík	2–0	HK
25 May 2016
UMF Grindavík	1–0	KA Akureyri
ÍBV	2–0	Huginn
Víðir	2–0 (a.e.t.)	UMF Sindri Höfn
Haukar	1–2	Víkingur Reykjavík
ÍA Akranes	1–0	KV
Keflavík ÍF	1–2	Fylkir
KR Reykjavík	1–2 (a.e.t.)	UMF Selfoss
Þróttur Reykjavík	3–1	Völsungur
Fjölnir Reykjavík	0–1	Valur
25 May 2016
Kría	0–3	Breiðablik UBK
FH	9–0	KF Fjallabyggd
Stjarnan	2–2 (a.e.t.) (7–6 p)	Víkingur Ólafsvík

== Round of 16 ==
Team 1	Score	Team 2
8 June 2016
Vestri	2–3	Fram Reykjavík
UMF Grindavík	0–2	Fylkir
Þróttur Reykjavík	4–0	Grótta
FH	4–1	Leiknir Reykjavík
9 June 2016
Stjarnan	0–2	ÍBV
ÍA Akranes	1–2 (a.e.t.)	Breiðablik UBK
Víkingur Reykjavík	2–3 (a.e.t.)	Valur
UMF Selfoss	4–3 (a.e.t.)	Víðir

== Quarter-finals ==
Team 1	Score	Team 2
3 July 2016
Breiðablik UBK	2–3	ÍBV
Valur	5–0	Fylkir
4 July 2016
Þróttur Reykjavík	0–3	FH
5 July 2016
Fram Reykjavík	0–2	UMF Selfoss

== Semi-finals ==
Team 1	Score	Team 2
27 July 2016
UMF Selfoss	1–2	Valur
28 July 2016
ÍBV	1–0	FH

== Final ==
13 August 2016
16:00

Valur	2–0	ÍBV
Lárusson 8', 21'	Report

Laugardalsvöllur, Reykjavík
Attendance: 3,511
Referee: Þorvaldur Árnason

== Top goalscorers ==
7 goals

- (Iceland) Karel Sigurðsson (Berserkir)

4 goals

- (Iceland) Atli Sigurðsson (KH)
- (Iceland) Orri Freyr Hjaltalín (Magni)
- (Iceland) Jóhann Örn Sigurjónsson (Magni)
- (Iceland) Aron Grétar Jafetsson (KFG)

3 goals

- (Iceland) Kristinn Þór Rósbergsson (Magni)
- (Iceland) Einar Guðnason (Berserkir)
- (Iceland) Baldur Jónsson (KFG)
- (Iceland) Bjarni Pálmason (KFG)
- (Iceland) Kristinn Justiniano Snjólfsson (UMF Sindri Höfn)
- (Cape Verde) Fufura (Haukar)
- (Iceland) Kolbeinn Kárason (Leiknir Reykjavík)
