= 2024 Icelandic Cup =

Icelandic Cup - Mjólkurbikarinn

Tournament details
- Country: Iceland
- Teams: 74

Final positions
- Champions: KA
- Runners-up: Víkingur Reykjavík
- All statistics correct as of 21 September 2024.

The 2024 Icelandic Cup, also known as Mjólkurbikarinn ("The Milk Cup") for sponsorship reasons, was the 65th edition of the Icelandic national football cup. The winners qualified for the 2025–26 Conference League first qualifying round.

KA won the cup on 21 September 2024 (their first Icelandic Cup win), defeating Víkingur Reykjavík 2–0 in the final (a repeat of the previous season's final).

== First round ==
48 clubs from Tier 3 and below entered the first round. Three clubs from the men's 2nd division, 2024 2. deild karla (KF, KFA, and Völsungur) and one club from the 3rd division, 2024 3. deild karla (Magni) received byes.

Team 1	Score	Team 2
1 April 2024
Augnablik	7–1	Álftanes
Léttir	2–7	ÍH
4 April 2024
Selfoss	w/o	Stokkseyri
Kría	1–2	Úlfarnir
Ýmir Kópavogur	11–0	Þorlákur
Mídas	1–3	RB
Elliði	0–3	Víkingur Ólafsvík
Álafoss	0–6	KFG
5 April 2024
Spyrnir	0–5	Höttur/Huginn
Hafnir	12–0	KM Reykjavík
Hamar	2–5 (a.e.t.)	Hvíti Riddarinn
Haukar	20–0	Afríka
KH	5–1	Reynir Sandgerði
Smári	2–2 (3–4 p)	Árbær
Tindastóll	7–0	Samherjar
6 April 2024
Kári	5–0	IB
KFR	4–8	KFK Kópavogur
KV	3–0	KFS
SR	2–4	Kormákur/Hvöt
Vængir Júpiters	6–2	Hörður Ísafjörður
Árborg	12–0	Reynir Hellissandur
Víðir Garður	2–1 (a.e.t.)	Sindri
Þróttur Vogum	1–3	KÁ Ásvellir
Skallagrímur	1–3	Ægir

== Second round ==
The 24 first round winners, the four teams given first round byes, and the 12 teams from the 2024 1. deild karla entered the second round.

Team 1	Score	Team 2
10 April 2024
Víkingur Ólafsvík	2–3	Keflavík
12 April 2024
Hvíti Riddarinn	0–3	Grindavík
Selfoss	3–1	Kári
Dalvík/Reynir	2–0	KF
Hafnir	3–0	Úlfarnir
ÍH	4–4 (5–4 p)	Ýmir Kópavogur
13 April 2024
Tindastóll	1–1 (3–2 p)	Magni
Árborg	1–2	Árbær
KÁ Ásvellir	6–3 (a.e.t.)	RB
Leiknir Reykjavík	1–4	Afturelding
Grótta	3–2	Njarðvík
IBV	5–1	KFG
Vængir Júpiters	1–7	Þróttur Reykjavík
KH	2–4 (a.e.t.)	Fjölnir
KV	1–7	ÍR
Höttur/Huginn	2–0	Völsungur
Ægir	2–3	Haukar
14 April 2024
Augnablik	5–2	Kormákur/Hvöt
Þór Akureyri	5–1	KFA
KFK Kópavogur	0–3	Víðir Garður

== Round of 32 ==
The 20 second round winners and the 12 teams from the 2024 Besta deild karla entered the Round of 32.

Team 1	Score	Team 2
23 April 2024
Fjölnir	4–2	Selfoss
24 April 2024
KÁ Ásvellir	2–9	KR
Valur	3–0	FH
Þróttur Reykjavík	1–2	HK
Augnablik	1–2	Stjarnan
25 April 2024
Árbær	0–3	Fram
Haukar	2–4	Vestri
Höttur/Huginn	0–1	Fylkir
IBV	1–2	Grindavík
Afturelding	4–1	Dalvík/Reynir
Grótta	0–3	Þór Akureyri
ÍA	3–0	Tindastóll
KA	2–1 (a.e.t.)	ÍR
Víkingur Reykjavík	4–1	Víðir Garður
ÍH	4–2	Hafnir
Keflavík	2–1	Breiðablik

== Round of 16 ==
The 16 Round of 32 winners entered the Round of 16.

Team 1	Score	Team 2
14 May 2024
Fjölnir	0–2	Þór Akureyri
15 May 2024
KA	3–1	Vestri
16 May 2024
Keflavík	3–1	ÍA
Fylkir	3–1	HK
Grindavík	1–4	Víkingur Reykjavík
Stjarnan	5–3	KR
17 May 2024
Fram	3–0	ÍH
Afturelding	1–3	Valur

== Quarter-finals ==
The eight Round of 16 winners entered the quarter-finals.

Team 1	Score	Team 2
9 June 2024
Keflavík	3–3 (3–5 p)	Valur
12 June 2024
Þór Akureyri	0–1	Stjarnan
13 June 2024
KA	3–0	Fram
Víkingur Reykjavík	3–1	Fylkir

== Semi-finals ==
The four quarter-final winners entered the semi-finals.

Team 1	Score	Team 2
2 July 2024
KA	3–2	Valur
3 July 2024
Víkingur Reykjavík	1–1 (5–4 p)	Stjarnan

== Final ==
The final was held between the two semi-final winners.

21 September 2024
18:00

KA	2–0	Víkingur Reykjavík
Árnason 37'; Valsson 90+9'	Report

Laugardalsvöllur, Reykjavík
Attendance: 4,096
Referee: Pétur Guðmundsson
