= 2021 Icelandic Cup =

Icelandic Cup - Mjólkurbikarinn

Tournament details
- Country: Iceland
- Teams: 78

Final positions
- Champions: Víkingur R.
- Runners-up: ÍA

The 2021 Icelandic Cup, also known as Mjólkurbikarinn for sponsorship reasons, was the 62nd edition of the Icelandic national football cup.

== First round ==
64 clubs competed in the first round. The matches were played from 22 to 26 April 2021.

Team 1	Score	Team 2
22 April 2021
Njarðvík	3–0	KH
23 April 2021
Tindastóll	0–2	Völsungur
Elliði	2–3	ÍR
Hvíti Riddarinn	4–1	Árborg
KB	1–6	Þrottur Reykjavik
KV	1–3	Þrottur Vogum
Léttir	1–2	Víðir Garður
Smári	1–4	Grindavík
Skautafélagið Björninn	0–3	Knattspyrnufélagið Ásvellir
Kári	3–0^{1}	Vængir Júpiters
KFG	0–2	Álftanes
Mídas	0–12	Augnablik
Úlfarnir	2–0	Ísbjörninn
24 April 2021
Álafoss	2–1	GG
Knattspyrnufélagið Berserkir	5–6 (a.e.t.)	KFS
Dalvík/Reynir	7–1	Samherjar
Fram Reykjavík	8–0	Hörður Ísafirði
Höttur/Huginn	7–1	Einherji
Kormákur/Hvöt	2–3	Hamrarnir
Kría	13–1	Afríka
Víkingur Ólafsvík	18–0	Gullfálkinn
UMF Selfoss	0–1	Kórdrengir
SR	1–0	RB
Ýmir Kópavogur	1–2	KFR
25 April 2021
Hamar	0–3	Vestri
KFB	0–5	UMF Stokkseyri
Snæfell	1–5	Skallagrímur
ÍBV	4–1	Reynir Sandgerði
Ægir Þorlákshöfn	4–0	Uppsveitir
KM Reykjavík	0–4	Haukar
Vatnaliljur	2–3	ÍH
26 April 2021
Reynir Hellissandur	0–2	Afturelding

- ^{1} Match awarded.

== Second round ==
A total of 40 teams competed in the second round. Ties were played from 30 April–2 May.

Team 1	Score	Team 2
30 April 2021
Augnablik	4–0	Ægir Þorlákshöfn
Afturelding	8–0	SR
Álftanes	0–2	ÍR
Fjölnir	7–1	Knattspyrnufélagið Ásvellir
ÍH	0–3	Úlfarnir
þór Akureyri	3–0	Magni Grenivík
1 May 2021
Vestri	1–0	KFR
Þrottur Reykjavik	1–3	Víkingur Ólafsvík
Dalvík/Reynir	2–3 (a.e.t.)	KF
Fjarðabyggðar	0–2	Sindri
Kári	5–1	Skallagrímur
KFS	4–0	Kría
Þrottur Vogum	1–3	Grótta
Víðir Garður	0–2	Fram Reykjavík
Völsungur	9–1	Hamrarnir
Álafoss	0–5	Njarðvík
Kórdrengir	3–3 (a.e.t.) (5–6 p)	ÍBV
2 May 2021
Leiknir Fáskrúðsfirði	3–0	Höttur/Huginn
Grindavík	3–0	Hvíti Riddarinn
UMF Stokkseyri	0–7	Haukar

== Third round (round of 32) ==
A total of 32 teams competed in this round of the competition, with the clubs from the Úrvalsdeild entering at this stage. Ties were played from 22 to 24 June.

Team 1	Score	Team 2
22 June 2021
KF	1–2	Haukar
þór Akureyri	2–1	Grindavík
Völsungur	2–1 (a.e.t.)	Leiknir Fáskrúðsfirði
23 June 2021
Afturelding	1–2	Vestri
ÍR	3–0	ÍBV
KFS	4–2	Víkingur Ólafsvík
Stjarnan	1–2 (a.e.t.)	KA
ÍA	3–0	Fram Reykjavík
Augnablik	1–4	Fjölnir
FH	4–1	Njarðvík
HK	2–1	Grótta
Keflavík	2–0 (a.e.t.)	Breiðablik
24 June 2021
Víkingur R.	3–0	Sindri
Fylkir	7–0	Úlfarnir
Kári	1–2	KR
Valur	2–0	Leiknir Reykjavík

== Fourth round (round of 16) ==
A total of sixteen teams competed in the fourth round, with matches played on 26, 27 and 28 June.

Team 1	Score	Team 2
10 August 2021
Vestri	4–0	þór Akureyri
Fjölnir	2–3	ÍR
11 August 2021
Keflavík	3–1	KA
ÍA	1–0	FH
HK	7–1	KFS
Valur	6–0	Völsungur
Fylkir	2–1	Haukar
12 August 2021
Víkingur R.	3–1	KR

== Quarter-finals (round of 8) ==
A total of eight teams competed in the quarter-finals, with matches played on 15 September.

Team 1	Score	Team 2
15 September 2021
ÍR	1–3	ÍA
Vestri	2–1	Valur
Fylkir	0–1 (a.e.t.)	Víkingur R.
HK	3–5	Keflavík

== Semi-finals (round of 4) ==
A total of four teams were competed in the semi-finals, with matches played on 2 October.

Team 1	Score	Team 2
2 October 2021
ÍA	2–0	Keflavík
Vestri	0–3	Víkingur R.

== Final ==
16 October 2021
15:00

ÍA	0–3	Víkingur R.
	Report	Agnarsson 17'; Árnason 45+2'; Guðjónsson 90+5'

Laugardalsvöllur, Reykjavík
Attendance: 4,829
Referee: Jóhann Ingi Jónsson
