= 2023 Icelandic Cup =

Icelandic Cup - Mjólkurbikarinn

Tournament details
- Country: Iceland
- Teams: 74

Final positions
- Champions: Víkingur Reykjavík
- Runners-up: KA
- All statistics correct as of 1 July 2023.

The 2023 Icelandic Cup, also known as Mjólkurbikarinn for sponsorship reasons, was the 64th edition of the Icelandic national football cup. The winners qualified for the 2024–25 Conference League first qualifying round. The cup was played from 22 March, when the first round kicked off, to 16 September, when the final was held.

Víkingur Reykjavík won the cup on 16 September 2023 with a 3–1 win over KA, their fourth consecutive Icelandic Cup win.

== First round ==
50 clubs competed in the first round. The first round got underway on 22 March and the last games were played on 2 April. The highest-scoring teams in the round were Þrottur Reykjavik, who won their match 18–0 against UMF Stokkseyri, and KV, who enjoyed a 17–0 win against Afríka.

Team 1	Score	Team 2
22 March 2023
Elliði	0–1	Árborg
30 March 2023
Vængir Júpiters	4–4 (a.e.t.) (5–6 p)	KH
31 March 2023
Úlfarnir	1–3	Þróttur Vogum
Knattspyrnufélagið Berserkir	1–2	Smári
KB	2–4	Kría
UMF Selfoss	7–1	Álftanes
Hvíti Riddarinn	3–2	GG
Kári	5–0	Léttir
KFG	7–0	Hafnir
Þrottur Reykjavik	18–0	UMF Stokkseyri
RB	5–3 (a.e.t.)	Álafoss
1 April 2023
Ýmir Kópavogur	1–2	KFS
Reynir Hellissandur	1–7	KFK
Njarðvík	4–0	Hörður Ísafirði
Árbær	2–1	Víkingur Ólafsvík
Haukar	2–3	Víðir Garður
Hamrarnir	2–7	Tindastóll
Magni Grenivík	4–0	Samherjar
2 April 2023
Uppsveitir	7–0	Hamar
ÍR	0–1	ÍH
Reynir Sandgerði	1–2	Ægir Þorlákshöfn
Knattspyrnufélagið Ásvellir	4–4 (a.e.t.) (2–1 p)	Kormákur/Hvöt
SR	1–5	Augnablik
Skallagrímur	2–3	KFR
KV	17–0	Afríka

== Second round ==
A total of 40 teams competed in the second round, which was held from 6–11 April. Fjölnir were the biggest winners this round, defeating Kría 10–0 away from home.

Team 1	Score	Team 2
6 April 2023
Árborg	1–3	Kári
Grótta	1–0	Vestri
Afturelding	0–1	Grindavík
KFA	7–1	Spyrnir
KFS	0–5	Þrottur Reykjavik
þór Akureyri	6–0	KF
8 April 2023
Sindri	4–3 (a.e.t.)	Höttur/Huginn
KFR	0–1 (a.e.t.)	KH
Augnablik	2–3	Njarðvík
KFG	3–2	ÍH
Þróttur Vogum	2–0	KV
KFK	0–8	UMF Selfoss
RB	3–2	Hvíti Riddarinn
Leiknir Reykjavík	2–0	Árbær
Völsungur	0–1	Magni Grenivík
ÍA	3–0	Víðir Garður
Dalvík/Reynir	2–1	Tindastóll
Smári	1–6	Ægir Þorlákshöfn
Uppsveitir	4–3	Knattspyrnufélagið Ásvellir
11 April 2023
Kría	0–10	Fjölnir

== Third round ==
The 20 second round winners and 12 teams in Tier 1 entered the third round. Ties were played from 19 to 20 April. The highest scoring match of the third round was Víkingur Reykjavík's 6–2 win against Magni Grenivík.

Team 1	Score	Team 2
19 April 2023
Stjarnan	1–0 (a.e.t.)	ÍBV
KA	5–0	Uppsveitir
KR	3–0	Þróttur Vogum
Leiknir Reykjavík	1–0	UMF Selfoss
Fjölnir	0–2	Breiðablik
Fram Reykjavík	2–3	Þrottur Reykjavik
Valur	4–1	RB
Keflavík	1–0 (a.e.t.)	ÍA
20 April 2023
Njarðvík	4–1	KFA
Ægir Þorlákshöfn	1–3	FH
Grindavík	2–1	Dalvík/Reynir
Víkingur Reykjavík	6–2	Magni Grenivík
Kári	1–1 (a.e.t.) (2–4 p)	þór Akureyri
Sindri	2–4	Fylkir
HK Kópavogur	5–0	KFG
Grótta	4–3	KH

== Fourth round ==
The 16 Round of 32 winners competed in the fourth round, which was played between 16 and 18 May. Stjarnan recorded the biggest victory of the round, winning 4–0 at home versus Keflavík.

Team 1	Score	Team 2
16 May 2023
þór Akureyri	3–1	Leiknir Reykjavík
17 May 2023
FH	2–1	Njarðvík
18 May 2023
Stjarnan	4–0	Keflavík
Valur	1–3	Grindavík
Þrottur Reykjavik	0–3	Breiðablik
Víkingur Reykjavík	2–1	Grótta
HK Kópavogur	1–3	KA
Fylkir	3–4	KR

== Quarter-finals ==
The eight fourth round winners competed in the quarter-finals.

Team 1	Score	Team 2
5 June 2023
þór Akureyri	1–2	Víkingur Reykjavík
Breiðablik	3–1	FH
6 June 2023
KA	2–1	Grindavík
KR	2–1	Stjarnan

== Semi-finals ==
The four quarter-final winners competed in the semi-finals, which were held on 4 July and 16 August. In the first semi-final, KA needed extra time and penalties to get past Breiðablik. The second semi-final resulted in a victory for Víkingur Reykjavík by a three-goal margin over KR.

Team 1	Score	Team 2
4 July 2023
KA	3–3 (a.e.t.) (3–1 p)	Breiðablik
16 August 2023
Víkingur Reykjavík	4–1	KR

== Final ==
Víkingur Reykjavík were victorious in the final, winning the cup for the fourth time in succession.

16 September 2023
17:00

Víkingur Reykjavík	3–1	KA
Vilhjálmsson 38'; Þrándarson 72'; Sigurpálsson 84'	Report	Árnason 82'

Laugardalsvöllur, Reykjavík
Attendance: 3,845
Referee: Helgi Mikael Jónasson
