= 2022 Icelandic Cup =

Icelandic Cup - Mjólkurbikarinn

Tournament details
- Country: Iceland
- Teams: 84

Final positions
- Champions: Víkingur R.
- Runners-up: FH

The 2022 Icelandic Cup, also known as Mjólkurbikarinn for sponsorship reasons, was the 63rd edition of the Icelandic national football cup.

== First round ==
64 clubs competed in the first round. The matches were played from 8–14 April 2022.

Team 1	Score	Team 2
8 April 2022
Reynir Sandgerði	6–1	Árbær
Grótta	8–0	KH
KF	0–1	Þróttur Reykjavík
Boltafélag Norðfjarðar	0–2	Einherji
KFB	0–15	Ægir Þorlákshöfn
KFG	2–2 (a.e.t.) (4–2 p)	Augnablik
Haukar	4–1	Léttir
Elliði	0–6	Grindavík
Vængir Júpiters	7–0	Álafoss
Afturelding	5–0	Ýmir Kópavogur
RB	10–4	Gullfálkinn
9 April 2022
Hamrarnir	3–3 (a.e.t.) (0–3 p)	Samherjar
Kári	3–0	Árborg
Kórdrengir	8–1	IH
Kormákur/Hvöt	0–3	Dalvík/Reynir
Hörður Ísafirði	1–5	Álftanes
GG	1–4	KV
Ísbjörninn	1–9	UMF Selfoss
Víðir Garði	6–0	SR
Knattspyrnufélagið Berserkir	0–6	Víkingur Ólafsvík
Kría	5–8	Uppsveitir
Sindri	6–0	Spyrnir
10 April 2022
Afríka	0–5	Úlfarnir
Þróttur Vogum	0–1	ÍR
Smári	2–4	KFS
UMF Stokkseyri	0–11	Hvíti Riddarinn
Hafnir	0–1	KM Reykjavík
Knattspyrnufélagið Ásvellir	4–0	KB
11 April 2022
Hamar	1–0	KFR
13 April 2022
Njarðvík	1–1 (a.e.t.) (5–4 p)	Fjölnir
Reynir Hellissandur	5–1	Skallagrímur
14 April 2022
Tindastóll	0–4	KF

== Second round ==
A total of 40 teams competed in the second round. Ties were played from 21 to 25 April.

Team 1	Score	Team 2
21 April 2022
Kórdrengir	5–0	Álftanes
Ægir Þorlákshöfn	1–0	KFS
Uppsveitir	0–4	Reynir Sandgerði
Fylkir	5–0	Úlfarnir
KF	0–2	Magni Grenivík
Höttur/Huginn	3–2	Einherji
22 April 2022
Njarðvík	5–2	KFG
þór Akureyri	7–0	Samherjar
Grótta	12–0	KM Reykjavík
Reynir Hellissandur	0–16	ÍR
Afturelding	3–1	Vængir Júpiters
23 April 2022
Þróttur Reykjavík	0–3	HK Kópavogur
Sindri	2–0	KFA
KV	2–3	Grindavík
Knattspyrnufélagið Ásvellir	0–5	Haukar
Völsungur	2–5	Dalvík/Reynir
Hamar	0–2	UMF Selfoss
Vestri	2–0	Víðir Garði
Kári	2–0	Víkingur Ólafsvík
25 April 2022
Hvíti Riddarinn	6–0	RB

== Third round (round of 32) ==
A total of 32 teams competed in this round of the competition, with the clubs from the Úrvalsdeild entering at this stage. Ties were played from 24 to 26 May.

Team 1	Score	Team 2
24 May 2022
Höttur/Huginn	1–3	Ægir Þorlákshöfn
UMF Selfoss	1–1 (a.e.t.) (5–3 p)	Magni Grenivík
Vestri	2–3 (a.e.t.)	Afturelding
Sindri	3–5	ÍA
Hvíti Riddarinn	0–2	Kórdrengir
Grindavík	1–2	ÍR
HK	3–1	Grótta
Dalvík/Reynir	2–0	þór Akureyri
25 May 2022
Fylkir	2–1	ÍBV
FH	3–0	Kári
Keflavík	1–4	Njarðvík
Stjarnan	0–3	KR
26 May 2022
Fram Reykjavík	3–2 (a.e.t.)	Leiknir Reykjavík
KA	4–1	Reynir Sandgerði
Haukar	0–7	Víkingur R.
Breiðablik	6–2	Valur

== Fourth round (round of 16) ==
A total of sixteen teams competed in the fourth round, with matches played on 26, 27 and 28 June.

Team 1	Score	Team 2
26 June 2022
HK	6–0	Dalvík/Reynir
KA	4–1	Fram Reykjavík
FH	6–1	ÍR
Ægir Þorlákshöfn	1–0	Fylkir
Njarðvík	0–1	KR
27 June 2022
Kórdrengir	2–1	Afturelding
ÍA	2–3	Breiðablik
28 June 2022
UMF Selfoss	0–6	Víkingur R.

== Quarter-finals (round of 8) ==
A total of eight teams competed in the quarter-finals, with matches played on 10 and 11 August.

Team 1	Score	Team 2
10 August 2022
KA	3–0	Ægir Þorlákshöfn
Kórdrengir	2–4	FH
11 August 2022
Víkingur R.	5–3	KR
HK	0–1	Breiðablik

== Semi-finals (round of 4) ==
A total of four teams were competed in the semi-finals, with matches played on 31 August and 1 September.

Team 1	Score	Team 2
31 August 2022
Breiðablik	0–3	Víkingur R.
1 September 2022
FH	2–1	KA

== Final ==
1 October 2022
16:00

FH	2–3 (a.e.t.)	Víkingur R.
Heiðarsson 28'; Jónsson 90' (o.g.)	Report	Punyed 26'; Hansen 89', 91'

Laugardalsvöllur, Reykjavík
Attendance: 4,381
Referee: Ívar Orri Kristjánsson
