= 2019 Icelandic Cup =

Icelandic Cup–Mjólkurbikarinn

Tournament details
- Country: Iceland
- Teams: 78

Final positions
- Champions: Víkingur
- Runners-up: FH
- All statistics correct as of 14 September 2019.

The 2019 Icelandic Cup, also known as Mjólkurbikarinn for sponsorship reasons, was the 60th edition of the Icelandic national football cup. The 2019 Icelandic Cup final was played on 14 September at Laugardalsvöllur. The 2019 winners and current holders of the cup are Víkingur after beating FH 1–0 in the final.

== Calendar ==
Below are the dates for each round as given by the official schedule:

Round	Main date	Number of fixtures	Clubs
First Round	10–15 April 2019	28	56 → 28
Second Round	13–24 April 2019	20	40 → 20
Round of 32	28 April–1 May 2019	16	32 → 16
Round of 16	28–30 May 2019	8	16 → 8
Quarter-finals	26–27 June 2019	4	8 → 4
Semi-finals	14–15 August 2019	2	4 → 2
Final	14 September 2019	1	2 → 1

== First round ==
Team 1	Score	Team 2
10 April 2019
Kári	5–1	Hamar
11 April 2019
Afturelding	6–0	Léttir
Elliði	8–1	Alafoss
Fram	2–1	GG
Grótta	8–2	Álftanes
ÍR	5–0	SR
Ýmir	6–1	Afríka
12 April 2019
Fenrir	0–2	Ægir
KFG	1–2 (a.e.t.)	Reynir S.
Vængir Júpiters	9–0	Kóngarnir
ÍH	3–0	Björninn
Kría	1–2	KA Hafnarfjörður
Mídas	1–0	Ísbjörninn
13 April 2019
Augnablik	8–1	Árborg
Dalvík/Reynir	6–0	Samherjar
Haukar	5–2	KFS
Höttur/Huginn	3–1	Einherji
Kórdrengir	7–0	KM
Nökkvi	2–4	KF
UMF Tindastóll	5–0	Aeskan
Vestri	1–0	Víðir
Hvíti riddarinn	4–1	Kormákur/Hvöt
Hörður Í.	1–5	Berserkir
KFR	1–0	KH
14 April 2019
Skallagrímur	1–4	KV
Ulfarnin	6–1	Vatnaliljur
Selfoss	3–0	Þróttur Vogum
15 April 2019
KB	2–1	Snæfell

== Second round ==
Team 1	Score	Team 2
13 April 2019
Sindri	5–1	Leiknir F.
17 April 2019
Fram	6–0	Ýmir
Leiknir R.	1–4	Fjölnir
KA Hafnarfjörður	4–2	Berserkir
18 April 2019
Afturelding	3–2	Selfoss
Þróttur Reykjavík	2–0	Reynir S.
Elliði	1–2 (a.e.t.)	Mídas
Grótta	10–0	KFR
ÍR	3–0	KV
KB	1–2 (a.e.t.)	Ægir
Keflavík	1–0	Haukar
Kórdrengir	1–0	Vængir Júpiters
Víkingur Ó.	2–6	Ulfarnin
Hvíti riddarinn	0–6	Njarðvík
ÍH	0–3	Augnablik
20 April 2019
KF	0–4	Magni
Höttur/Huginn	0–2	Fjarðabyggð
Þór	2–3	Dalvík/Reynir
Vestri	3–1	Kári
24 April 2019
Völsungur	3–1	UMF Tindastóll

== Round of 32 ==
Team 1	Score	Team 2
28 April 2019
Vestri	2–1 (a.e.t.)	Ulfarnin
30 April 2019
Ægir	0–4	Þróttur Reykjavík
Fram	1–3 (a.e.t.)	Njarðvík
Grindavík	4–1	Afturelding
ÍR	1–3	Fjölnir
Keflavík	1–0	Kórdrengir
1 May 2019
Augnablik	0–3	ÍA
Fylkir	2–1	Grótta
Völsungur	4–0	Mídas
KA Hafnarfjörður	1–2	Víkingur R.
HK	5–1	Fjarðabyggð
KR	5–0	Dalvík/Reynir
Magni	1–10	Breiðablik
Sindri	0–5	KA
ÍBV	1–0 (a.e.t.)	Stjarnan
Valur	1–2	FH

== Round of 16 ==
Team 1	Score	Team 2
28 May 2019
Víkingur R.	1–1 (a.e.t.) (5–4 p)	KA
Grindavík	3–1	Vestri
Keflavík	0–1 (a.e.t.)	Njarðvík
29 May 2019
ÍBV	2–0	Fjölnir
30 May 2019
Völsungur	0–2	KR
FH	2–1	ÍA
Þróttur Reykjavík	1–3	Fylkir
Breiðablik	3–1	HK

== Quarter-finals ==
Team 1	Score	Team 2
26 June 2019
ÍBV	2–3	Víkingur R.
27 June 2019
FH	7–1	Grindavík
Breiðablik	2–2 (a.e.t.) (4–2 p)	Fylkir
KR	3–0	Njarðvík

== Semi-finals ==
Team 1	Score	Team 2
14 August 2019
FH	3–1	KR
15 August 2019
Víkingur R.	3–1	Breiðablik

== Final ==
14 September 2019
17:00

Víkingur R.	1–0	FH
Karlsson 58'	Report

Laugardalsvöllur, Reykjavík
Attendance: 4.257
Referee: Pétur Guðmundsson
