= Arnar Gunnlaugsson =

Icelandic footballer and coach

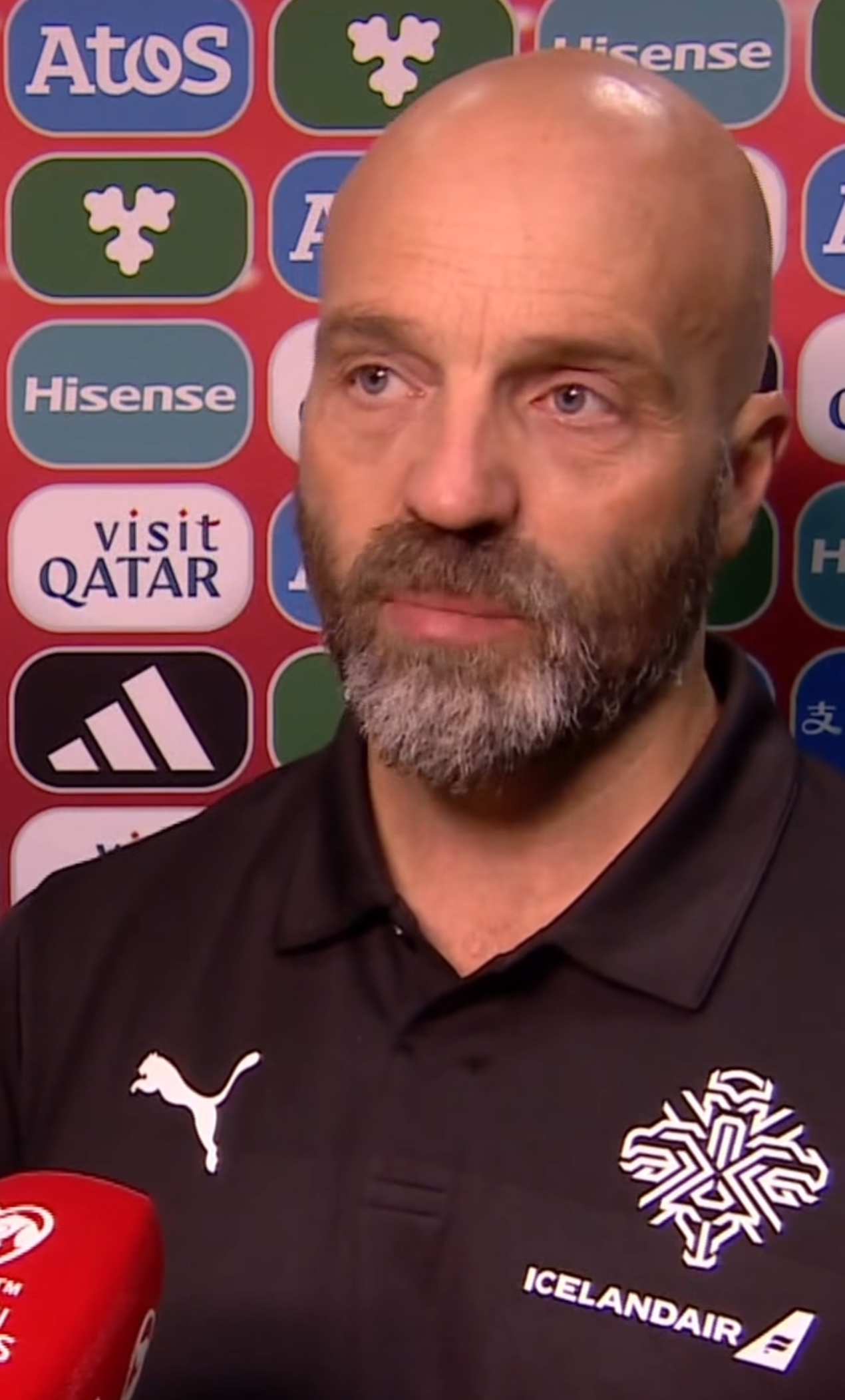
- Arnar in 2025

Personal information
- Full name: Arnar Bergmann Gunnlaugsson
- Date of birth: 6 March 1973 (age 53)
- Place of birth: Akranes, Iceland
- Height: 6 ft 1 in (1.85 m)
- Position: Forward

Youth career
- 1988: ÍA

Senior career*
Years	Team	Apps	(Gls)
1989–1992	ÍA	56	(37)
1992–1994	Feyenoord	9	(0)
1994–1995	1. FC Nürnberg	28	(8)
1995	ÍA	7	(15)
1995–1997	Sochaux	25	(4)
1997	ÍA	2	(1)
1997–1999	Bolton Wanderers	42	(13)
1999–2002	Leicester City	30	(3)
2000	→ Stoke City (loan)	13	(2)
2002	→ Stoke City (loan)	9	(3)
2002–2003	Dundee United	6	(0)
2003–2005	KR	34	(14)
2006	ÍA	15	(5)
2007–2008	FH	24	(10)
2008–2009	ÍA	14	(8)
2009	Valur	4	(0)
2010	Haukar	18	(8)
2011	Fram	14	(7)
Total		350	(138)

International career
1988	Iceland U17	7	(4)
1988–1990	Iceland U19	13	(6)
1992	Iceland U21	6	(2)
1993–2003	Iceland	32	(3)

Managerial career
- 2006: ÍA
- 2008–2009: ÍA
- 2018–2025: Vikingur R
- 2025–: Iceland
- * Club domestic league appearances and goals

Arnar Bergmann Gunnlaugsson (born 6 March 1973) is an Icelandic football manager and former player who manages the Iceland national team.

During his playing career as a forward, he enjoyed spells at Leicester City, Stoke City, Bolton Wanderers, IA Akranes, 1. FC Nürnberg, Feyenoord and Dundee United, and has been an international player until 2003.

As a manager he has managed Víkingur Reykjavík to two Úrvalsdeild titles in 2021, 2023, and 4 Icelandic Cups in 2019, 2021, 2022, 2023 before he became manager of Iceland.

== Club career ==
While at Leicester City he played a key role in their victorious 1999–2000 Football League Cup campaign. He made two appearances during the run, and both times came on as a substitute and scored in a penalty shootout; once against Leeds United and once against Fulham. He was not part of Leicester's squad for the 2000 League Cup Final at Wembley, however days after the final he was loaned out to Stoke where he had a second opportunity to play at the stadium; this time starting as Stoke won the 2000 Football League Trophy Final.

== International career ==
As a young player, Arnar made several appearances for the Icelandic international youth teams. Arnar made his debut for Iceland in an April 1993 friendly match against the United States. He went on to earn 32 caps, scoring three goals between 1993 and 2003. His last international match was an April 2003 friendly match against Finland in which he was substituted with Veigar Páll Gunnarsson.

== Personal life ==
Arnar is the twin brother of Bjarki Gunnlaugsson who was also an Icelandic international, and the older brother of Garðar Gunnlaugsson who played for the national team as well.

== Career statistics ==
=== Club ===
Appearances and goals by club, season and competition
Club	Season	League			National cup		League cup		Other		Total	
Club	Season	Division	Apps	Goals	Apps	Goals	Apps	Goals	Apps	Goals	Apps	Goals
ÍA	1989	Úrvalsdeild	8	1	—		—		—		8	1
ÍA	1990	Úrvalsdeild	12	3	—		—		—		12	3
ÍA	1991	1.deild	18	18	—		—		—		18	18
ÍA	1992	Úrvalsdeild	18	15	—		—		—		18	15
ÍA	Total		56	37	—		—		—		56	37
Feyenoord	1992–93	Eredivisie	4	0	—		—		—		4	0
Feyenoord	1993–94	Eredivisie	5	0	—		—		—		5	0
Feyenoord	Total		9	0	—		—		—		9	0
1. FC Nürnberg	1994–95	2. Bundesliga	28	8	—		—		—		28	8
ÍA	1995	Úrvalsdeild	7	15	—		—		—		7	15
Sochaux	1995–96	Ligue 2	12	3	—		—		—		12	3
Sochaux	1996–97	Ligue 2	13	1	—		—		—		13	1
Sochaux	Total		25	4	—		—		—		25	4
ÍA	1997	Úrvalsdeild	2	1	—		—		—		2	1
Bolton Wanderers	1997–98	Premier League	15	0	1	0	3	1	—		19	1
Bolton Wanderers	1998–99	First Division	27	13	1	0	6	1	—		34	14
Bolton Wanderers	Total		42	13	2	0	9	2	—		53	15
Leicester City	1998–99	Premier League	9	0	0	0	0	0	—		9	0
Leicester City	1999–2000	Premier League	2	0	3	0	2	0	—		7	0
Leicester City	2000–01	Premier League	17	3	3	1	1	0	—		21	4
Leicester City	2001–02	Premier League	2	0	0	0	0	0	—		2	0
Leicester City	Total		30	3	6	1	3	0	—		39	4
Stoke City (loan)	1999–2000	Second Division	13	2	0	0	0	0	5	1	18	3
Stoke City (loan)	2001–02	Second Division	9	3	0	0	0	0	2	0	11	3
Stoke City (loan)	Total		22	5	0	0	0	0	7	1	29	6
Dundee United	2002–03	Scottish Premier League	6	0	0	0	1	0	—		7	0
KR	2003	Úrvalsdeild	11	7	—		—		—		11	7
KR	2004	Úrvalsdeild	15	7	—		—		—		15	7
KR	2005	Úrvalsdeild	8	0	—		—		—		8	0
KR	Total		34	14	—		—		—		25	14
ÍA	2006	Úrvalsdeild	15	5	—		—		—		15	5
FH	2007	Úrvalsdeild	12	6	—		—		—		12	6
FH	2008	Úrvalsdeild	12	4	—		—		—		12	4
FH	Total		24	10	—		—		—		24	10
ÍA	2008	Úrvalsdeild	6	3	—		—		—		6	3
ÍA	2009	1. deild karla	8	5	—		—		—		8	5
ÍA	Total		14	8	—		—		—		14	8
Valur	2009	Úrvalsdeild	4	0	—		—		—		4	0
Haukar	2010	Úrvalsdeild	18	8	—		—		—		18	8
Fram	2011	Úrvalsdeild	14	7	—		—		—		14	7
Career total			350	138	14	1	13	2	7	1	384	142

=== International ===
Appearances and goals by national team and year
National team	Year	Apps	Goals
Iceland	1993	5	0
Iceland	1994	7	0
Iceland	1995	6	2
Iceland	1996	2	0
Iceland	1997	3	0
Iceland	1998	4	0
Iceland	1999	3	1
Iceland	2002	1	0
Iceland	2003	1	0
Total		32	3

== Honours ==
=== Player ===
ÍA

- Úrvalsdeild: 1992, 1995

Stoke City

- Football League Second Division play-offs: 2002
- Football League Trophy: 1999–2000

KR

- Icelandic Cup: 2003

FH

- Úrvalsdeild: 2008
- Icelandic Cup: 2007

Individual

- Úrvalsdeild Top Scorer: 1992, 1995
- Úrvalsdeild Most promising player: 1992

=== Manager ===
Víkingur FC

- Úrvalsdeild (2): 2021, 2023
- Icelandic Cup (4): 2019, 2021, 2022, 2023
- Icelandic Super Cup: 2022, 2024

Individual

- Úrvalsdeild Coach of the Year: 2021, 2023
