= 4. deild karla (football) =

Football league in Iceland

- Founded: 2013
- Country: Iceland
- Confederation: UEFA
- Number of clubs: 11
- Level on pyramid: 5
- Promotion to: 3. deild karla
- Relegation to: 5. deild karla
- Domestic cup(s): Icelandic Cup; League Cup
- Current champions: Tindastóll (2024)
- Most championships: KH; Einherji (2 title)
- Current: 2025 4. deild karla

4. deild karla (e. Men's fourth division) is a football league in Iceland. It is the fifth and second-lowest division in the Icelandic football league system.

== Format ==
The division was added to the Icelandic football league system before the 2013 season to make room for a fourth nationwide league. It will be largely the same in format as the previous 3. deild karla was.

=== Group stage ===
The division is split into four groups with teams in each group playing the other teams in the same group twice, home and away. The top two teams in each group qualify for the play-off stage for a total of eight teams in the playoffs.

=== Play-off stage ===
The play-offs are played in a knock-out format. Teams are drawn together and play home and away, the winning team progressing to the next round. There is no away goal rule; if teams are drawn at the end of the second match, extra time is played. If after extra time teams are still drawn, penalties decide the winner.

The final is a single match played on a neutral ground. The winner of the final is the 4th division champion. Both teams that reach the final are promoted to the third division.

There is also a match played for the third place where the losing teams from the semi-finals play. This is also a single match on a neutral ground.

== Current clubs (2027) ==
=== 2027 Stadiums and locations ===
Locations of the 2025 2. deild karla teams

Team	Location	Stadium
Álafoss	Mosfellsbær	Varmárvöllur
Árborg	Selfoss	JÁVERK-völlurinn
Ellíði	Reykjavík (Árbær)	Fylkisvöllur
Hamrarnir	Akureyri	Greifavöllurinn
KFR	Hvölsvöllur	SS-völlurinn
KH	Reykjavík (Hlíðarendi)	N1-völlurinn
Skallagrímur	Borgarnes	Skallagrímsvöllur
Úlfarnir	Reykjavík (Grafarholt)	Lambhagavöllur
Vængir Júpiters	Reykjavík (Grafarvogur)	Egilshöll

== Past winners ==
Promoted teams shown in green

Year	Winners	Runners-up	3rd Place	4th Place
2013	Einherji	Berserkir	KFG	Elliði
2014	Álftanes	Kári	KFS^{1}	Þróttur V.
2015	Vængir Júpiters	Þróttur V.	ÍH	Augnablik
2016	Berserkir	KFG	Hvíti riddarinn	KH
2017	KH	Augnablik	Álftanes	Kórdrengir
2018	Reynir Sandgerði	Skallagrímur	Kórdrengir^{2}	Álftanes
2019	Ægir	Elliði	Hvíti riddarinn	Kormákur/Hvöt
2020	ÍH	KFS	Hamar	Kormákur/Hvöt
2021	KH	Kormákur/Hvöt	Vængir Júpiters^{3}	Hamar
2022	Einherji	Árbær	Ýmir	Hvíti Riddarinn
2023	Vængir Júpiters	KFK	Árborg	Tindastóll
2024	Tindastóll	Ýmir	Árborg	Hamar

1 - KFS promoted due to 3. deild club Grundarfjörður deciding not to compete in 2015.
2 - Kórdrengir promoted due to the 2019 3. deild expanding from 10 to 12 teams.
3 - Vængir Júpiters promoted due to the merger of 2. deild clubs Ungmennafélagið Leiknir and Knattspyrnufélag Fjarðabyggðar into Knattspyrnufélag Austfjarða.
