= 1994 2. deild karla =

Icelandic football league season

The 1994 season of 2. deild karla was the 29th season of third-tier football in Iceland.

== League table ==
| Pos | Team | Pld | W | D | L | GF | GA | GD | Pts | Promotion or relegation |
|---|---|---|---|---|---|---|---|---|---|---|
| 1 | Skallagrímur (C, P) | 18 | 11 | 3 | 4 | 48 | 25 | +23 | 36 | Promoted to 1995 1. deild karla |
| 2 | Víðir (P) | 18 | 9 | 8 | 1 | 35 | 18 | +17 | 35 | Promoted to 1995 1. deild karla |
| 3 | Fjölnir | 18 | 9 | 5 | 4 | 33 | 26 | +7 | 32 | |
| 4 | Völsungur | 18 | 7 | 9 | 2 | 31 | 24 | +7 | 30 | |
| 5 | BÍ | 18 | 8 | 4 | 6 | 36 | 32 | +4 | 28 | |
| 6 | Höttur | 18 | 6 | 2 | 10 | 26 | 30 | −4 | 20 | |
| 7 | Dalvík | 18 | 5 | 2 | 11 | 36 | 39 | −3 | 17 | |
| 8 | Haukar | 18 | 5 | 2 | 11 | 20 | 35 | −15 | 17 | |
| 9 | Tindastóll (R) | 18 | 3 | 7 | 8 | 17 | 34 | −17 | 16 | Relegated to 1995 3. deild karla |
| 10 | Reynir S. (R) | 18 | 3 | 6 | 9 | 16 | 35 | −19 | 15 | Relegated to 1995 3. deild karla |

Rules for classification: 1) points; 2) goal difference; 3) number of goals scored.
(C) Champions; (P) Promoted; (R) Relegated

== Top scorers ==
| Scorer | Goals | Team |
|---|---|---|
| (Iceland) Sigurður Valur Árnason | 15 | Víðir |
| (Iceland) Sindri Grétarsson | 14 | BÍ |
| (Iceland) Valdimar K. Sigurðsson | 12 | Skallagrímur |
| (Iceland) Hjörtur Hjartarson | 11 | Skallagrímur |
| (Iceland) Þorvaldur Logason | 10 | Fjölnir |
| (Iceland) Haraldur Hinriksson | 10 | Skallagrímur |
| (Iceland) Örvar Eiríksson | 9 | Dalvík |
