= 3. deild karla =

Football league in Iceland

- Founded: 1997; 29 years ago 1982 (as 4. deild karla)
- Country: Iceland
- Confederation: UEFA
- Number of clubs: 12
- Level on pyramid: 4
- Promotion to: 2. deild karla
- Relegation to: 4. deild karla
- Domestic cup(s): Bikarkeppni karla League Cup
- Current champions: Hvíti Riddarinn (1 title) (2025)
- Current: 2025 3. deild karla

3. deild karla (e. Men's Third division) is a football league in Iceland. It is the fourth level in the Icelandic football league system. The league was reformed into a 10-team double round-robin tournament for the 2013 season, with the introduction of the newly established 5th level of the Icelandic football league system, 4. deild karla.

== Previous formats ==
Ever since 1982, the first season of 3. deild karla (then named 4. deild karla), and throughout the 2012 season, it was the lowest division in the league system, and as a consequence did not have a fixed number of teams. All who wished to enter and could fill certain requirements were allowed to compete, and between each season some teams quit and some new teams came in, sometimes after having previously quit. There were various formats used during the 31 seasons when Division 3 was the lowest league, the latest version using group stages and then eight-team playoffs to decide two promoted teams.

== Current format ==
Since 2013, 3. deild karla has been a nationwide league. From 2013 to 2018 ten teams played in the league. But the number of teams was then increased to 12, and 2019 was the first season with 12 teams. Each team plays each other once home and once away, giving a total of 22 games per team. The two highest-placed teams are promoted to 2. deild karla, while the two lowest teams are relegated to 4. deild karla.

== 2025 season ==
In 2025 the league consisted of the two teams relegated from 2. deild karla the year before, the six teams that reached the playoffs in the previous 3. deild but did not gain promotion to 2. deild, and two teams who were decided in a playoff between the four clubs in 3rd place in their groups.

=== 2025 Stadiums and locations ===
Locations of the 2025 2. deild karla teams

Team	Location	Stadium	2024 season
Augnablik	Kópavogur	Fífan	10th
Álftanes	Álftanes	Bessastaðavöllur	4. deild, 1st
Hamar	Hveragerði	Grýluvöllur	4. deild, 2nd
Hvíti Riddarinn	Mosfellsbær	Varmárvöllur	2. deild, 12th
Höttur/Huginn	Egilsstaðir	Vilhjálmsvöllur	6th
KF	Fjallabyggð	Ólafsfjarðarvöllur	8th
KFG	Garðabær	Stjörnuvöllur	2. deild, 11th
KV	Reykjavík (Vesturbær)	KV Park	5th
Reynir Sandgerði	Sandgerði	Brons-völlurinn	3rd
Sindri	Höfn	Sindravellir	7th
Tindastóll	Sauðárkrókur	Sauðárkróksvöllur	4th
Ýmir	Kópavogur	Kórinn	9th

== Past winners ==
Promoted teams shown in green

Year	Winners	Runners-up	3rd Place	4th Place
1997	KS	Tindastóll	Afturelding	Ernir Í.
1998	Sindri	Léttir	Hvöt	Leiknir F.
1999	Afturelding	KÍB	Njarðvík	Huginn/Höttur
2000	Haukar	Nökkvi	Þróttur N.	Fjölnir
2001	HK	Völsungur	Njarðvík^{1}	KFS
2002	KFS	Fjölnir	Fjarðabyggð	Leiknir F.
2003	Vikingur Ó.	Leiknir R.	Númi	Höttur
2004	Huginn	Fjarðabyggð	Skallagrímur	Reynir S.
2005	Reynir S.	Sindri	Grótta	Leiknir F.
2006	Höttur	Magni	ÍH^{2}	Kári
2007^{3}	Víðir	Grótta	Hvöt	Hamar
2008	Hamrarnir/Vinir^{4}	BÍ/Bolungarvík	KV	Skallagrímur
2009	Völsungur	KV	Hvíti riddarinn	Ýmir
2010	Tindastóll	Dalvík/Reynir	Árborg^{5}	KB
2011	KV	KFR	KB	Magni
2012^{6}	Sindri	Ægir	Leiknir F.	Magni
2013	Fjarðabyggð	Huginn	KFR	Víðir
2014	Höttur	Leiknir F.	Berserkir	Víðir
2015	Magni	Völsungur	Reynir S.	Einherji
2016	Tindastóll	Víðir	Einherji	Kári
2017	Kári	Þróttur V.	KFG	Vængir Júpiters
2018	Dalvík/Reynir	KFG	KF	Vængir Júpiters
2019	Kórdrengir	KF	KV	Vængir Júpiters
2020	KV	Reynir S.	KFG	Augnablik
2021	Höttur/Huginn	Ægir	KFG	Sindri
2022	Sindri	Dalvík/Reynir	KFG	Víðir
2023	Reynir Sandgerði	Kormákur/Hvöt	Árbær	Víðir
2024	Kári	Víðir	Árbær	Augnablik

1 - Njarðvík promoted due to the merger of the 1. deild clubs Leiftur and Dalvík.
2 - ÍH promoted due to expansion of 1. deild karla to 12 teams.
3 - Tindastóll also promoted due to expansion of Úrvalsdeild karla and 2. deild karla to 12 teams.
4 - Upon promotion Hamrarnir/Vinir merged with the relegated ÍH to form ÍH/HV
5 - Árborg promoted as Tindastóll merged with 2. deild karla side Hvöt, creating a new team called Tindastóll/Hvöt, playing in the 2. deild karla.
6 - Teams that finished in 3rd-10th place (Leiknir F, Magni, Huginn, Kári, ÍH, Víðir, Augnablik and Grundarfjörður) were the only teams remaining for the 2013 season, a ten-team league consisting of those 8 teams plus Fjarðabyggð and KFR who came down from 2. deild karla. The remaining teams joined a new lowest division that launched in 2013.
