= Einherji =

- Full name: Ungmennafélagið Einherji
- Nickname: Einherjar
- Founded: 1 December 1929; 96 years ago, as Íþróttafélagið Einherjar
- Ground: Vopnafjarðarvöllur
- Capacity: n/a
- Chairman: Víglundur Páll Einarsson
- League: Non-league
- 2022: 4. deild karla, 1st
- Website: https://www.einherji.net/
Home colours	Away colours

Ungmennafélagið Einherji (Icelandic pronunciation: [ˈuŋkˌmɛnːaˌfjɛːˌlaijɪð ˈeinˌhɛrjɪ], lit. 'Einherji Youth Club' (Note: Ungmennafélagið is the definite form of Ungmennafélag, meaning "the youth club".)) is an Icelandic sports club, based in Vopnafjörður, Iceland. The club is named after the einherjar, figures from Norse Mythology.

== History ==
The club was founded in Vopnafjörður on December 1, 1929, as Íþróttafélagið Einherjar. The first chairman was Ingólfur Erlendsson. The name of the club was changed to Ungmennafélagið Einherjar in 1943 and later to Ungmennafélagið Einherji.

== Football ==
=== Men's football ===
In 1974 the men's team played in the Icelandic 3rd division (2. deild karla) for the first time. The team got promoted to the 2nd division (1. deild karla) for the first time in 1981. In the eighties the team played six seasons in the 2nd division reaching the club's record high; 5th place in 1986. By 1990 the club had been relegated down two divisions; to the fourth tier and hasn't seen promotion to the third tier since then.

In 2013, the team was promoted from the newly formed 4th division (4. deild karla) to the 3rd, by winning the division after a 2–0 victory in the final against Berserkir. This was Einherji's first title in the club's history.

==== Managers ====
- (Iceland) Gunnlaugur Dan Ólafsson (1974)
- (Iceland) Skarphéðinn Óskarsson (1975)
- (Iceland) Þórir Jónsson (1976)
- (Iceland) Sigurður Þorsteinsson (1977)
- (Iceland) Ingólfur Hannesson (1978)
- (Iceland) Þormóður Einarsson (1979)
- (Iceland) Einar Friðþjófsson (1980)
- (Iceland) Ólafur Jóhannesson (1981–1982)
- (Iceland) Gústaf Baldvinsson (1983)
- (Iceland) Hreiðar Sigtryggsson (1985)
- (Iceland) Snorri Rútsson (1985)
- (Iceland) Njáll Eiðsson (1986, 1988–1989, 1996)
- (Iceland) Aðalbjörn Björnsson (1987, 1991–1992, 1995)
- (Iceland) Örnólfur Oddsson (1990)
- (Iceland) Ólafur Ólafsson (1993)
- (Iceland) Eysteinn Kristinsson (1994)
- (Iceland) Sigurður Pálsson (1998)
- (Iceland) Hallgrímur Guðmundsson (1999)
- (Iceland) Helgi Már Þórðarson (2003–2004)
- (Iceland) Davíð Örvar Ólafsson (2009–2010)
- (Scotland) David Hannah (2011 – June, 2012)
- (Scotland) Ryan McCann (caretaker) (June – Aug 31, 2012)
- (Iceland) Víglundur Páll Einarsson (2013–2015, 2017)
- (Iceland) Yngvi Borgþórsson (2016)
- (Iceland) Jón Orri Ólafsson (2018), (caretaker July 13, 2021 – 2021)
- (Trinidad and Tobago) Akim Armstrong (2019)
- (England) Ashley Civil (2020)
- (Iceland) Helgi Snær Agnarsson (2021 – July 6, 2021)
- (Iceland) Ingvi Ingólfsson (2022)

==== Seasons ====
Season		Pos.	Pl.	W	D	L	GS	GA	P	Cup	Notes
1974	Third tier – 2. deild karla (Group G)	4	N/A	N/A	N/A	N/A	N/A	N/A	2	Did not participate	
1975	Third tier – 2. deild karla (Group G)	1	5	3	0	2	14	8	8	Did not participate	4th in promotion playoff Group A
1976	Third tier – 2. deild karla (Group F)	3	6	N/A	N/A	N/A	N/A	N/A	5	First round	
1977	Third tier – 2. deild karla (Group F)	2	12	N/A	N/A	N/A	N/A	N/A	18	Third round	
1978	Third tier – 2. deild karla (Group F)	1	10	N/A	N/A	N/A	N/A	N/A	17	Quarter finals	2nd in promotion playoff Group A
1979	Third tier – 2. deild karla (Group F)	1	12	8	2	1	37	13	20	Second round	2nd in promotion playoff Group B
1980	Third tier – 2. deild karla (Group F)	1	12	N/A	N/A	N/A	N/A	N/A	21	Second round	2nd in promotion playoff Group A
1981	Third tier – 2. deild karla (Group F)	1	8	7	1	0	36	7	16	First round	1st in promotion playoff Group B. 2nd in Championship playoffs. Promoted to 1. deild karla.
1982	Second tier – 1. deild karla	7	18	6	3	9	24	31	15	Third round	
1983	Second tier – 1. deild karla	8	18	5	7	6	17	21	17	Fourth round	
1984	Second tier – 1. deild karla	10	18	1	3	14	11	35	6	Second round	Relegated to 2. deild karla
1985	Third tier – 2. deild karla (North-East Group)	1	16	11	3	2	35	17	36	Fourth round	2nd in Championship playoffs. Promoted to 1. deild karla.
1986	Second tier – 1. deild karla	5	18	9	2	7	28	24	29	Second round	
1987	Second tier – 1. deild karla	9	18	5	4	9	21	35	19	Third round	Relegated to 2. deild karla
1988	Third tier – 2. deild karla (North-East Group)	1	14	10	3	1	36	11	33	Fourth round	2nd in Championship playoffs. Promoted to 1. deild karla.
1989	Second tier – 1. deild karla	10	18	4	2	12	21	51	14	First round	Relegated to 2. deild karla
1990	Third tier – 2. deild karla	9	18	2	4	12	27	48	10	Third round	Relegated to 3. deild karla
1991	Fourth tier – 3. deild karla (Group E)	2	14	8	3	3	38	24	27	Second round	
1992	Fourth tier – 3. deild karla (Group D)	2	18	14	2	2	52	22	44	Second round	
1993	Fourth tier – 3. deild karla (Group D)	3	12	7	2	3	39	16	23	Second round	
1994	Fourth tier – 3. deild karla (Group D)	5	12	4	2	6	34	34	14	Third round	
1995	Fourth tier – 3. deild karla (Group D)	4	12	4	2	6	14	19	14	First round	
1996	Fourth tier – 3. deild karla (Group D)	3	12	3	2	7	23	30	11	First round	
1997	Non-League	N/A	N/A	N/A	N/A	N/A	N/A	N/A	N/A	Did not participate	
1998	Fourth tier – 3. deild karla (Group E)	5	12	2	1	9	26	44	7	First round	
1999	Fourth tier – 3. deild karla (Group E)	4	12	1	0	11	7	34	3	First round	
2000	Non-League	N/A	N/A	N/A	N/A	N/A	N/A	N/A	N/A	Did not participate	
2001	Non-League	N/A	N/A	N/A	N/A	N/A	N/A	N/A	N/A	Did not participate	
2002	Non-League	N/A	N/A	N/A	N/A	N/A	N/A	N/A	N/A	Did not participate	
2003	Fourth tier – 3. deild karla (Group D)	5	15	5	1	9	24	36	16	First round	
2004	Fourth tier – 3. deild karla (Group D)	3	12	7	1	4	20	15	22	First round	
2005	Non-League	N/A	N/A	N/A	N/A	N/A	N/A	N/A	N/A	Did not participate	
2006	Non-League	N/A	N/A	N/A	N/A	N/A	N/A	N/A	N/A	Did not participate	
2007	Non-League	N/A	N/A	N/A	N/A	N/A	N/A	N/A	N/A	Did not participate	
2008	Non-League	N/A	N/A	N/A	N/A	N/A	N/A	N/A	N/A	Did not participate	
2009	Fourth tier – 3. deild karla (Group D)	4	15	5	5	5	33	34	20	Third round	
2010	Fourth tier – 3. deild karla (Group D)	4	12	6	1	5	30	26	19	First round	
2011	Fourth tier – 3. deild karla (Group D)	4	12	3	6	3	17	23	15	Did not participate	
2012	Fourth tier – 3. deild karla (Group D)	4	14	7	2	5	32	20	23	Did not participate	Relegated to 4. deild karla
2013	Fifth tier – 4. deild karla (Group C)	1	14	11	1	2	59	14	34	Second round	Champions after promotion playoffs. Promoted to 3. deild karla
2014	Fourth tier – 3. deild karla	8	18	5	5	8	24	33	20	First round	
2015	Fourth tier – 3. deild karla	4	18	8	5	5	36	35	29	First round	
2016	Fourth tier – 3. deild karla	3	18	9	2	7	38	30	29	First round	
2017	Fourth tier – 3. deild karla	6	18	7	4	7	27	25	25	First round	
2018	Fourth tier – 3. deild karla	6	18	9	1	8	33	32	28	Third round	
2019	Fourth tier – 3. deild karla	7	22	6	6	10	27	35	24	First round	
2020*	Fourth tier – 3. deild karla	9	20	7	2	11	39	53	23	First round	*Rest of the season cancelled due to COVID-19
2021	Fourth tier – 3. deild karla	11	22	6	2	14	36	51	20	First round	Relegated to 4. deild karla
2022	Fifth tier – 4. deild karla (Group E)	1	15	14	1	0	73	12	43	Second round	Champions after promotion playoffs. Promoted to 3. deild karla
2025	Utandeild KSÍ	N/A	N/A	N/A	N/A	N/A	N/A	N/A	N/A	First round	

==== Current squad ====
As of 13 July 2021

Note: Flags indicate national team as defined under FIFA eligibility rules; some limited exceptions apply. Players may hold more than one non-FIFA nationality.

No.	Pos.	Nation	Player
1	GK	ISL	Björgvin Geir Garðarsson
2	FW	ESP	Ismael Youssa Yann Trevor
3	DF	ESP	Cristofer Miñano
4	MF	ISL	Guðni Þór Sigurjónsson
5	MF	ISL	Benedikt Blær Guðjónsson
6	MF	ISL	Björn Andri Ingólfsson
7	MF	ISL	Bjartur Aðalbjörnsson (captain)
9	FW	ESP	Alejandro Lechuga
10	MF	ISL	Eiður Orri Ragnarsson
11	MF	ISL	Heiðar Aðalbjörnsson (vice-captain)

No.	Pos.	Nation	Player
14	DF	ISL	Freymar Örn Ómarsson
15	DF	ISL	Ingvi Örn Ingólfsson
16	DF	ISL	Helgi Már Jónsson
17	MF	BUL	Dilyan Kolev
19	MF	BUL	Stefan Balev
20	DF	ISL	Ármann Davíðsson
21	DF	ISL	Hafþór Berg Ríkharðsson
22	MF	ISL	Jón Gestur Ben Birgisson
50	DF	NOR	Amanj Habib Mohammadi

==== Player records ====
===== Most league appearances =====
	Name	Years	Seasons	Total appearances
1	(Iceland) Kristján Davíðsson	1976–1995	20	278
2	(Iceland) Aðalbjörn Björnsson	1974–1998	24	251

===== Most league goals =====
As of October 19th 2020

Statistics are missing from 1974–1981

	Name	Years	Seasons	Total goals
1	(Iceland) Sigurður Donys Sigurðsson	2003, 2009, 2012–2020	10	85
2	(Bulgaria) Todor Hristov	2015–2020	6	69
3	(Iceland) Hallgrímur Guðmundsson	1985–1999	N/A	67
4	(Iceland) Gunnlaugur Bjarnar Baldursson	2009–2018	10	50
5	(Iceland) Kristján Davíðsson	1976–1995	20	40 (From 1981)

==== Notable players ====
- (Iceland) Birkir Kristinsson
- (Iceland) Njáll Eiðsson
- (Iceland) Ólafur Jóhannesson
- (Iceland) Sigurður Donys Sigurðsson
- (Iceland) Bjarni Óskar Þorsteinsson
- (Scotland) David Hannah
- (Scotland) Ryan McCann

==== Chairmen ====
- 1929–193?: Ingólfur Erlendsson
- 193?–1938: Lorenz Karlsson
- 1938–1939: Guðni Sigurjónsson
- 1939–1940: Þorberg Jónsson
- 1940: Guðni Sigurjónsson
- 1940: Ragnar Pétursson
- 1940–1941: Sigurjón Jónsson
- 1941–1943: Kjartan Björnsson
- 1943–1944: Sigurjón Þorbergsson
- 1944–1948: Pétur Nikulásson
- 1948–1952: Ásgrímur Halldórsson
- 1952–1953: Pétur Nikulásson
- 1953–1955: Sveinn Sigurðsson
- 1955–1956: Hreinn Sveinsson
- 1956–1957: Gunnar Jónsson
- 1957–19??: Halldór Karl Halldórsson
- 1960–196?: Pétur Nikulásson
- 1964/65–1969: Gísli Jónsson
- 1969–1973: Jón Andrésson
- 1973–1974: Hafþór Róbertsson
- 1974–1975: Sveinn Antoníusson
- 1975–1985: Aðalbjörn Björnsson
- 1985–1991: Ólafur K. Ármannsson
- 1991–2002: Einar Björn Kristbergsson
- 2002–2004: Svava Birna Stefánsdóttir
- 2004–2012: Einar Björn Kristbergsson
- 2013–2019: Magnús Már Þorvaldsson
- 2019: Linda Björk Stefánsdóttir
- 2019–2021: Víglundur Páll Einarsson
- 2021–2023: Bjartur Aðalbjörnsson
- 2023: Víglundur Páll Einarsson

=== Women's football ===
==== Notable players ====
- (Moldova) Violeta Mițul

== Crest and colours ==
=== Crest ===
The club crest was designed in 1975 but until that time the club had no crest. The dragon in the crest is a reference to Snorri Sturluson's Heimskringla. One of the Landvættir of Iceland was the dragon guarding Vopnafjörður:

King Harald told a warlock to hie to Iceland in some altered shape, and to try what he could learn there to tell him: and he set out in the shape of a whale. And when he came near to the land he went to the west side of Iceland, north around the land, where he saw all the mountains and hills full of guardian-spirits, some great, some small. When he came to Vapnafjord he went in towards the land, intending to go on shore; but a huge dragon rushed down the dale against him with a train of serpents, paddocks, and toads, that blew poison towards him.

— Snorri Sturluson, Heimskringla/King Olaf Trygvason's Saga/Part I

The crest is an orange dragon spitting fire. In front of the dragon is a dark green banner with the club's name written in orange letters.

=== Kit evolution ===
The club's colours have been orange and green since the early 1970s. The club's first kit was from the Icelandic kit and sportwear manufacturer Henson. This kit was composed of a light orange shirt with a green collar and green cuffs. The shorts were green but the socks orange.

1974–1978	1979–1981	1982–1984	1984–1987	1988	1989	1992-199?

199?–2002	2003–2004	2009–2012	2013–2016	2017–2018	2019	2020-2021

=== Kit suppliers and shirt sponsors ===
Period	Kit manufacturer	Kit sponsor
1974–1981	Henson	Samvinnubankinn Vopnafirði
1982–1984	Henson	World Carpets
1985–1988	Henson	Tangi hf.
1989–1990	Henson	Landsbankinn
1991	Berri	Landsbankinn
1992–199?	Adidas	Landsbankinn
199?–2002	Erreà	Tangi hf.
2003–2004	Prostar	Tangi hf.
2009–2012	Henson	Mælifell ehf.
2013–2021	Nike	Mælifell ehf.
2022–present	Erreà	Brim hf.
