= Fellabær =

- Town
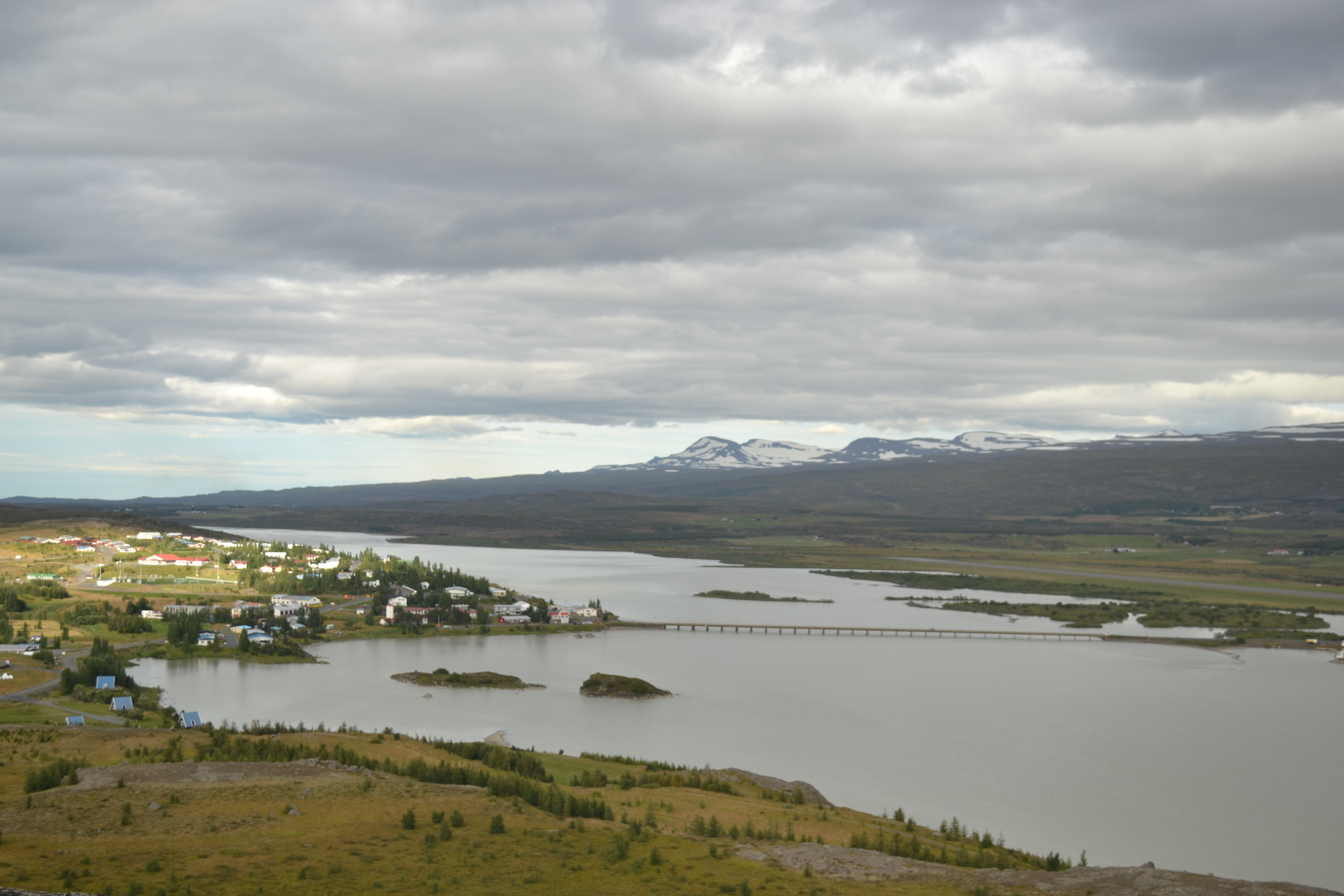
- View of Fellabær

- Location of the Municipality of Múlaþing

- Location in Iceland
- Coordinates: 65°17′N 14°23′W
- Country: Iceland
- Constituency: Northeast Constituency
- Region: Eastern Region
- Municipality: Múlaþing

Population (2024)
  - Total: 415
- Time zone: UTC+0 (GMT)
- Website: www.mulathing.is

Fellabær (Icelandic pronunciation: [ˈfɛtlaˌpaiːr̥]) is a town in Eastern Iceland, located right across Lagarfljót from Egilsstaðir.

A short bridge across Lagarfljót, approximately 300 metres (984 ft) in length, connects Egilsstaðir and Fellabær. The bridge is a part of the Ring Road. The municipality of Fljótsdalshérað provides free shuttle services between the two towns. Amenities in the town include a bookshop with a cafe, an Olís gas station and several places for accommodation.
