= Sauðárkróksvöllur =

Sports venue in Sauðárkrókur, Iceland

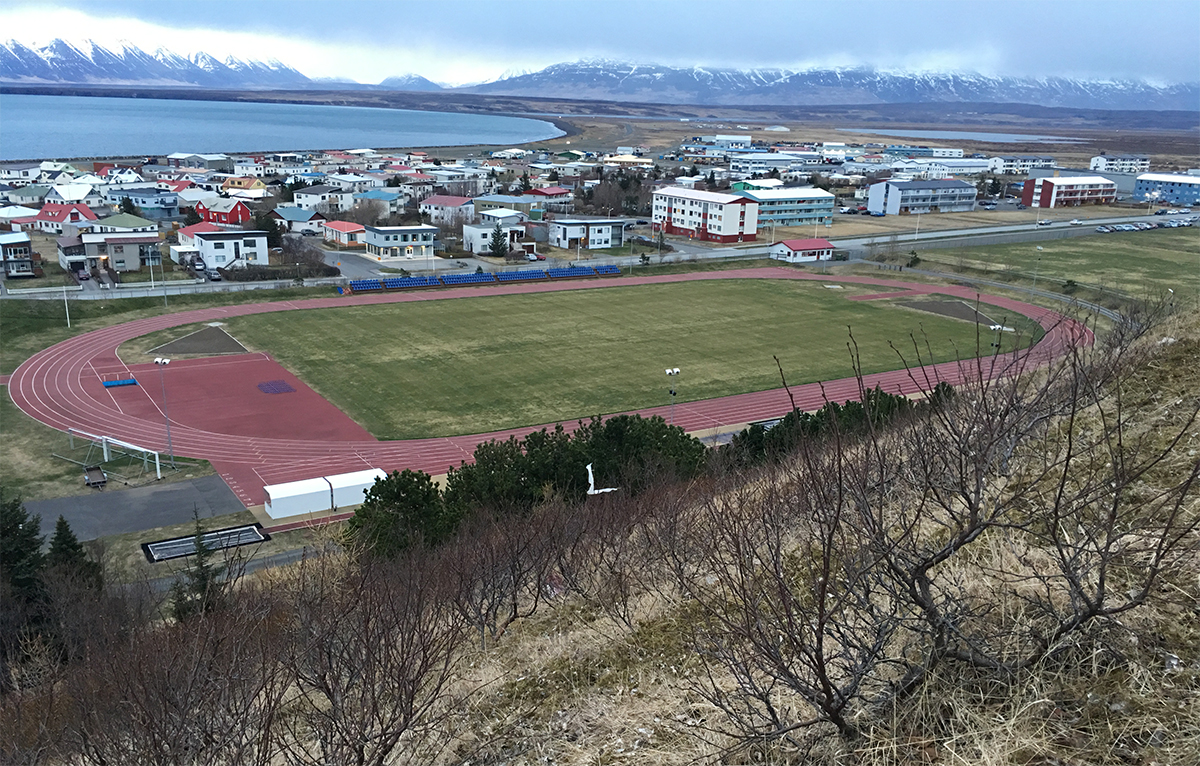
- Interactive map of Sauðárkróksvöllur
- Location: Sauðárkrókur, Iceland
- Coordinates: 65.745122°N 19.645743°W
- Capacity: 2,500
- Surface: Grass

Construction
- Opened: 2004

Tenant
- UMF Tindastóll

Sauðárkróksvöllur (Icelandic pronunciation: [ˈsœyːðˌaurˌkʰrouksˌvœtlʏr̥], lit. 'Sauðárkrókur Field' or more precisely 'Sauðárkrókur Stadium') is a football stadium in Sauðárkrókur, Iceland.

Sauðárkróksvöllur is an Icelandic open-air stadium that has a standing spectator capacity of about 2,500, but no permanent seating. It opened in 2004, and has a grass surface. It was built with a combination of public and private funding for the Icelandic Games held in the summer of 2004. The stadium was also used for the 2004 and 2009 youth games, the 2006 and 2007 Icelandic Athletic championships and various other large or small events. Sauðárkróksvöllur is used by the local sports club, UMF Tindastóll, which helps maintain the pitch with the aid of volunteers.
