= Selfoss (men's football) =

Icelandic men's football team

- Full name: Ungmennafélag Selfoss
- Nickname: Selfyssingar
- Founded: 1955; 71 years ago
- Ground: JÁVERK-völlur; Selfoss, Iceland
- Capacity: 750
- Chairman: Leó Árnason
- Manager: Bjarni Jóhannsson
- League: 2. deild karla
- 2025: 1. deild karla, 11th of 12 (relegated)
| Home colours | Away colours |

The Selfoss men's football team, commonly known as Selfoss (Icelandic pronunciation: [ˈsɛlˌfɔsː]) or UMF Selfoss, is the men's football department of the Ungmennafélag Selfoss multi-sport club. It is based in Selfoss, Iceland. The team plays at JÁVERK-völlurinn and traditionally play in a maroon strip.

== History ==
The football department of Ungmennafélag Selfoss was established in 1955 but the team's debut season was not until 1966. From 1966 to 1993 the team played in 1. deild karla (2nd level in pyramid), 2. deild karla (3rd level in pyramid) and 3. deild karla (4th level in pyramid). From 1993 to 2007 the team played in 2. deild, but were always close to being promoted. In the summer of 2007 the team were finally promoted to 1. deild. In the summer of 2008 (the football season in Iceland is played from May to September due to harsh winter) the team was 1 point and 8 goals from being promoted to Úrvalsdeild (1st level in pyramid). In the summer of 2009 the team won 1. deild and were finally promoted to Úrvalsdeild for the first time. In the team's debut season in Úrvalsdeild, the 2010 season, the team was relegated to 1. deild. Before the 2010 season the club's board decided to hire a retired and well known Icelandic football player, Guðmundur Benediktsson, as the team's new head coach. Guðmundur had no experience as a football coach and the summer was very difficult for him and the inexperienced team which was based on young local players. For the spring transfer period in 2010 the team only received two young players which was not enough to bring the club to a higher standard. On 13 October 2010 the club announced that former Icelandic national team coach Logi Ólafsson had been signed as a new head coach on a two-year contract. In his first season as the team's coach, in the summer of 2011, the team was promoted back to Úrvalsdeild, ending the season in second place (two teams are promoted in each division).

== Current squad ==
As of 1 September 2025

Note: Flags indicate national team as defined under FIFA eligibility rules; some limited exceptions apply. Players may hold more than one non-FIFA nationality.

| No. | Pos. | Nation | Player |
|---|---|---|---|
| 1 | GK | POL | Robert Blakala |
| 2 | DF | ISL | Ívan Breki Sigurðsson |
| 3 | DF | ISL | Reynir Freyr Sveinsson |
| 4 | DF | SWE | Alexander Berntsson |
| 5 | MF | ISL | Jón Vignir Pétursson |
| 6 | MF | ISL | Daði Kolviður Einarsson |
| 7 | MF | SCO | Harley Willard |
| 8 | FW | ESP | Raul Tanque |
| 9 | MF | ISL | Aron Fannar Birgisson |
| 10 | MF | ESP | Nacho Gil |
| 11 | FW | ESP | Alfredo Argüello |
| 12 | GK | ISL | Arnór Elí Kjartansson |

| No. | Pos. | Nation | Player |
|---|---|---|---|
| 13 | GK | POL | Paweł Broniszewski |
| 15 | MF | ISL | Alexander Vokes |
| 17 | MF | ISL | Brynjar Bergsson |
| 18 | DF | ISL | Dagur Jósefsson |
| 21 | MF | ISL | Frosti Brynjólfsson |
| 22 | FW | ISL | Jón Daði Böðvarsson |
| 23 | MF | ISL | Elías Karl Heiðarsson |
| 25 | FW | ISL | Sesar Örn Harðarson |
| 28 | DF | ISL | Eysteinn Ernir Sverrisson |
| 32 | MF | ISL | Aron Vokes |
| 77 | MF | ISL | Einar Bjarki Einarsson |

=== Out on loan ===
Note: Flags indicate national team as defined under FIFA eligibility rules; some limited exceptions apply. Players may hold more than one non-FIFA nationality.

| No. / Pos. / Nation / Player; — / MF / ISL / Guðmundur Stefánsson (at Ægir until 31 January 2026) | No. / Pos. / Nation / Player; — / FW / ISL / Elvar Orri Sigurbjörnsson (at Ægir until 31 January 2026) |

== Past players ==
Jon Daði Böðvarsson now playing for English club Bolton. Also played in the final stages in Euro 2016.

Viðar Örn Kjartansson now playing for Vålerengens IF.

Guðmundur Þórarinsson now playing for New York City.

== Stats history ==
| Season | League | Pos. | Pl. | W | D | L | GS | GA | P | Cup | Notes |
|---|---|---|---|---|---|---|---|---|---|---|---|
| 1966 | 2. deild | 1 | 6 | 4 | 0 | 2 | 15 | 8 | 8 | 1st round | Promoted to 1. deild / 2 points for a win |
| 1967 | 1. deild (Group A) | 2 | 6 | 3 | 0 | 3 | 8 | 8 | 6 | Didn't qualify | Only 1st place gave place in playoffs / 2 points for a win |
| 1968 | 1. deild (Group B) | 3 | 6 | 1 | 2 | 3 | 11 | 14 | 4 | Didn't qualify | 2 points for a win |
| 1969 | 1. deild (Group A) | 2 | 6 | 1 | 3 | 2 | 7 | 8 | 5 | Semi-finals | Only 1st place gave place in playoffs / 2 points for a win |
| 1970 | 1. deild | 3 | 14 | 6 | 4 | 4 | 23 | 27 | 16 | Didn't qualify | 2 points for a win |
| 1971 | 1. deild | 7 | 14 | 3 | 1 | 10 | 17 | 48 | 7 | Didn't qualify | Only one team relegated / 2 points for a win |
| 1972 | 1. deild | 5 | 14 | 5 | 1 | 8 | 26 | 28 | 11 | Didn't qualify | 2 points for a win |
| 1973 | 1. deild | 7 | 14 | 4 | 0 | 10 | 17 | 39 | 8 | Final 16 | Only one team relegated / 2 points for a win |
| 1974 | 1. deild | 5 | 14 | 5 | 0 | 9 | 19 | 35 | 10 | Final 16 | 2 points for a win |
| 1975 | 1. deild | 4 | 14 | 5 | 5 | 4 | 26 | 22 | 15 | Final 16 | 2 points for a win |
| 1976 | 1. deild | 8 | 16 | 4 | 3 | 9 | 28 | 51 | 11 | Didn't qualify | Only one team relegated / 2 points for a win |
| 1977 | 1. deild | 8 | 18 | 2 | 3 | 13 | 14 | 43 | 7 | Final 16 | Relegated to 2. deild / 2 points for a win |
| 1978 | 2. deild (Group A) | 1 | 10 | ? | ? | ? | ? | ? | 18 | Didn't qualify | Promoted to 1. deild / Champions overall / 2 points for a win |
| 1979 | 1. deild | 5 | 18 | 7 | 3 | 8 | 25 | 26 | 17 | Didn't qualify | 2 points for a win |
| 1980 | 1. deild | 5 | 18 | 6 | 5 | 7 | 31 | 37 | 17 | Didn't qualify | 2 points for a win |
| 1981 | 1. deild | 9 | 18 | 3 | 3 | 12 | 10 | 36 | 9 | 1st round | Relegated to 2. deild / 2 points for a win |
| 1982 | 2. deild (Group A) | 2 | 14 | 7 | 4 | 3 | 22 | 18 | 18 | 1st round | Lost in playoffs / 2 points for a win |
| 1983 | 2. deild (Group A) | 2 | 14 | 9 | 3 | 2 | 38 | 19 | 21 | Didn't qualify | Only 1st place gave promotion / 2 points for a win |
| 1984 | 2. deild (Southwest Group) | 4 | 16 | 8 | 3 | 5 | 31 | 20 | 27 | 3rd round | |
| 1985 | 2. deild (Southwest Group) | 1 | 14 | 10 | 4 | 0 | 37 | 11 | 34 | 1st round | Promoted to 1. deild / Champions overall in 2. deild |
| 1986 | 1. deild | 4 | 18 | 9 | 4 | 5 | 33 | 16 | 31 | 1st round | |
| 1987 | 1. deild | 4 | 18 | 8 | 5 | 5 | 35 | 28 | 29 | 3rd round | |
| 1988 | 1. deild | 5 | 18 | 7 | 4 | 7 | 27 | 26 | 25 | Final 16 | |
| 1989 | 1. deild | 4 | 18 | 9 | 1 | 8 | 23 | 27 | 28 | Final 16 | |
| 1990 | 1. deild | 6 | 18 | 7 | 3 | 8 | 34 | 33 | 24 | Final 8 | |
| 1991 | 1. deild | 8 | 18 | 5 | 2 | 11 | 23 | 38 | 17 | 1st round | |
| 1992 | 1. deild | 10 | 18 | 1 | 4 | 13 | 20 | 61 | 7 | 3rd round | Relegated to 2. deild |
| 1993 | 2. deild | 1 | 18 | 13 | 3 | 2 | 33 | 18 | 42 | 1st round | Promoted to 1. deild |
| 1994 | 1. deild | 9 | 18 | 4 | 6 | 8 | 18 | 43 | 18 | Didn't qualify | Relegated to 2. deild |
| 1995 | 2. deild | 4 | 18 | 9 | 1 | 8 | 38 | 41 | 28 | Final 32 | |
| 1996 | 2. deild | 6 | 18 | 7 | 5 | 6 | 39 | 46 | 26 | 2nd round | |
| 1997 | 2. deild | 3 | 18 | 12 | 3 | 3 | 45 | 31 | 39 | 2nd round | |
| 1998 | 2. deild | 8 | 18 | 5 | 4 | 9 | 38 | 42 | 19 | Final 32 | |
| 1999 | 2. deild | 3 | 18 | 9 | 4 | 5 | 41 | 32 | 31 | Final 32 | |
| 2000 | 2. deild | 3 | 18 | 9 | 3 | 6 | 46 | 25 | 30 | 2nd round | |
| 2001 | 2. deild | 4 | 18 | 8 | 4 | 6 | 35 | 25 | 28 | 3rd round | |
| 2002 | 2. deild | 5 | 18 | 8 | 2 | 8 | 36 | 41 | 26 | Final 32 | |
| 2003 | 2. deild | 3 | 18 | 11 | 2 | 5 | 40 | 23 | 35 | Final 32 | |
| 2004 | 2. deild | 5 | 18 | 5 | 6 | 7 | 38 | 37 | 21 | Final 32 | |
| 2005 | 2. deild | 5 | 18 | 8 | 2 | 8 | 27 | 30 | 26 | 2nd round | |
| 2006 | 2. deild | 4 | 18 | 7 | 6 | 5 | 26 | 18 | 27 | 3rd round | |
| 2007 | 2. deild | 2 | 18 | 11 | 3 | 4 | 39 | 17 | 36 | 3rd round | Promoted to 1. deild |
| 2008 | 1. deild | 3 | 22 | 14 | 4 | 4 | 54 | 36 | 46 | Final 32 | |
| 2009 | 1. deild | 1 | 22 | 15 | 2 | 5 | 53 | 26 | 47 | Final 32 | Promoted to Úrvalsdeild |
| 2010 | Úrvalsdeild | 12 | 22 | 5 | 2 | 15 | 32 | 51 | 17 | Final 32 | Relegated to 1. deild |
| 2011 | 1. deild | 2 | 22 | 15 | 2 | 5 | 44 | 22 | 47 | Final 32 | Promoted to Úrvalsdeild |
| 2012 | Úrvalsdeild | 11 | 22 | 6 | 3 | 13 | 30 | 44 | 21 | Final 8 | Relegated to 1. deild |
| 2013 | 1. deild | 8 | 22 | 8 | 3 | 11 | 44 | 38 | 27 | Final 32 | |
| 2014 | 1. deild | 9 | 22 | 7 | 5 | 10 | 24 | 33 | 26 | Final 32 | |
| 2015 | 1. deild | 10 | 22 | 5 | 5 | 12 | 20 | 38 | 20 | Final 32 | |

=== Overall ===
- Seasons spent at Level 1 of the Icelandic football league system: 2
- Seasons spent at Level 2 of the football league system: 28
- Seasons spent at Level 3 of the football league system: 20
- Seasons spent at Level 4 of the football league system: 0
- Seasons spent at Level 5 of the football league system: 0

As of season 2015.

== Kits ==
=== Sponsors and manufacturers ===
| Period | Kit manufacturer | Shirt sponsor |
|---|---|---|
| 1966–72 | (Unknown) | none |
| 1973–74 | (Unknown) | Jógúrt |
| 1975–77 | (Unknown) | Samverk Hellu |
| 1978–80 | (Unknown) | SG-einingahús |
| 1981–82 | Henson | Jógúrt |
| 1983 | Henson | Höfn |
| 1984–86 | Henson | Vöruhús KÁ |
| 1987–90 | Henson | Hornið |
| 1991–93 | Henson | Íslandsbanki Selfossi |
| 1994-01 | ABM | Íslandsbanki Selfossi |
| 2002 | Henson (Home) Adidas (Away) | bill.is |
| 2003–05 | Jako | Íslandsbanki Selfossi |
| 2006–07 | Henson | Glitnir |
| 2008 | Hummel | Glitnir |
| 2009–11 | Hummel | Íslandsbanki |
| 2012–14 | Errea | Íslandsbanki |

=== Kit evolution ===
- Home

| 1955–1956 | 1963–1965 | 1966–1969 | 1970–1972 | 1973–1974 | 1975–1977 | 1978–1982 | 1983 | 1984–1986 | 1987–1990 |

- Home

| 1991–1992 | 1993–95 | 1996 | 1997 | 1998 | 1999–2001 | 2002 | 2003–2005 | 2006–2011 | 2012–2013 |

- Away

| 1973–74 | 1984–1986 | 1996–2002 | 2003–2005 | 2006–2011 | 2012–14 |

- Third/Special

| 2012–14 |

== Managerial history ==
| Season(s) | Manager(s) | Notes |
|---|---|---|
| 1966–67 | (Iceland) Guðmundur Guðmundsson | |
| 1968 | (Iceland) Kristján Jónsson | |
| 1969 | (Iceland) Erlendur Magnússon and (Iceland) Helgi Númasson | First manager duo |
| 1970 | (Iceland) Anton Bjarnason | |
| 1971 | (Iceland) Gylfi Þ. Gíslason and (Iceland) Steinn Guðmundsson | |
| 1972 | (Iceland) Anton Bjarnason | |
| 1973 | (Iceland) Steinn Guðmundsson | Quit by mid-season |
| 1973–74 | (Iceland) Óli B. Jónsson | |
| 1975–76 | (Iceland) Árni Njálsson | |
| 1977–78 | (Iceland) Gylfi Þ. Gíslason | |
| 1979 | (Iceland) Anton Bjarnason | |
| 1980 | (Iceland) Jón B. Stefánsson and Magnús Jónatansson | |
| 1981 | (Iceland) Jón Hermansson | |
| 1982 | (Iceland) Gylfi Þ. Gíslason | |
| 1983 | (Iceland) Sigurlás Þorleifsson | |
| 1984 | (Iceland) Stefán Halldórsson | |
| 1985 | (Iceland) Magnús Jónatansson | |
| 1986 | (Iceland) Sigurður Halldórsson | |
| 1987–88 | (Iceland) Magnús Jónatansson | |
| 1989 | (Iceland) Hörður Hilmarsson | |
| 1990 | (Iceland) Heimir Karlsson | |
| 1991 | (Iceland) Þórarinn Ingólfsson | |
| 1992 | (Iceland) Gylfi Þ. Gíslason | Quit in August |
| 1992 | (Iceland) Einar Jónsson | Longest-serving manager (total) = 8 seasons |
| 1993–94 | (Iceland) Magni Blöndal Pétursson | |
| 1995–97 | (Iceland) Einar Jónsson | |
| 1998 | (Iceland) Ólafur Jóhannsson | Quit by mid-season |
| 1998–99 | (Iceland) Einar Jónsson | |
| 2000 | (Serbia) Miroslav Nikolic | Quit by mid-season / First foreign manager |
| 2000–03 | (Iceland) Kristinn Björnsson | Longest-serving manager (non-stop) = 4 seasons |
| 2004–05 | (Iceland) Gústaf Adolf Björnsson | |
| 2006–07 | (Iceland) Einar Jónsson | Quit early in the 2007 season |
| 2007–08 | (Serbia) Zoran Miljkovic | |
| 2009 | (Iceland) Gunnlaugur Jónsson | |
| 2010 | (Iceland) Guðmundur Benediktsson | |
| 2011–12 | (Iceland) Logi Ólafsson | |
| 2013–14 | (Iceland) Gunnar Guðmundsson | |
| 2014–15 | (Serbia) Zoran Miljkovic | Quit by mid-season |
| 2015–18 | (Iceland) Gunnar Rafn Borgþórsson | |
| 2019–2023 | (England) Dean Martin | |
| 2024–current | (Iceland) Bjarni Jóhannsson | |

== International links ==
In February 2013 it was announced that English club Brentford had entered into partnership with UMF Selfoss, enabling the clubs to exchange youth players to gain experience. The partnership also sees the two clubs exchanging coaching philosophies and allows Brentford to utilise Selfoss' scouting network. Towards the end of the 2012/13 English season, Brentford player Aaron Pierre joined Selfoss for a work experience period and teammate Montell Moore joined in February 2014. Selfoss players Svavar Berg Jóhannsson and Daniel Thorstein Thorsteinsson spent a period training with Brentford in October 2013.

=== Affiliated clubs ===
- (England) Brentford
