= Stjörnuvöllur =

Football stadium in Iceland

(Iceland) Stjörnuvöllur
- Interactive map of (Iceland) Stjörnuvöllur
- Location: Garðabær, Iceland
- Coordinates: 64.0874309°N 21.9315449°W
- Capacity: 1,400

Tenants
- Stjarnan; KFG

Samsung völlurinn (Icelandic pronunciation: [ˈvœtlʏrɪn], lit. 'Samsung Field' (Note: völlurinn is the definite form of völlur, meaning "the field".) or more precisely 'Samsung Stadium') also known as Stjörnuvöllur ([ˈstjœ(r)tnʏˌvœtlʏr̥], lit. 'Star Field' or 'Star Stadium') is a football stadium in Garðabær. It is located in Reykjavík, and seats 990 individuals in one stand, but can hold about 410 standing spectators additionally. It is the home stadium for Icelandic top-division football team Stjarnan.
