= Tindastóll (men's football) =

UMF Tindastóll
- Full name: Ungmennafélag Tindastóll
- Founded: 1907
- Ground: Sauðárkróksvöllur, Sauðárkrókur
- Capacity: 1,300
- Chairman: Ómar Bragi Stefánsson
- League: 3. deild karla
- 2025: 3. deild karla, 4th of 12
- Website: http://www.tindastoll.is
| Home colours | Away colours |

The Tindastóll men's football team, commonly known as Tindastóll, is an Icelandic football team based in Sauðárkrókur. It is part of the Tindastóll multi-sport club.

== History ==
In 2011 the team finished first in 2. deild karla and achieved promotion. In 2014 the club finished last in 1. deild karla and was relegated to 2. deild karla. The bad results continued in 2015 as the team finished second to last in 2. deild karla and was relegated to 3. deild karla.

On 20 August 2016, after an unbeaten 13-game run, the team achieved promotion back to 2. deild karla.

== Notable players ==
- (Iceland) Pétur Pétursson
- (Iceland) Rúnar Már Sigurjónsson
- (Iceland) Eyjólfur Sverrisson
- (Iceland) Sverrir Sverrisson
- (Canada) Stefan Lamanna
- (Haiti) Max Touloute
- (United States) Chris Tsonis
