= Magni Grenivík =

- Full name: Íþróttafélagið Magni Grenivík
- Founded: 10 July 1915; 110 years ago
- Ground: Grenivíkurvöllur, Grenivík, Iceland
- Capacity: 1,200
- Chairman: Þorsteinn Þormóðsson
- Manager: Sveinn Þór Steingrímsson
- League: 2. deild karla
- 2025: 3. deild karla, 2nd of 12 (promoted)
Home colours	Away colours

Magni Grenivík is an Icelandic sports club from the village of Grenivík, in northern-central Iceland, mainly known for its football team. The club's football team currently plays in the second tier of Icelandic football also known as Inkasso-deild karla. Magni was founded in 1915 by Magnús Björnsson, making it one of the oldest teams in Icelandic football history.

== Stadium ==
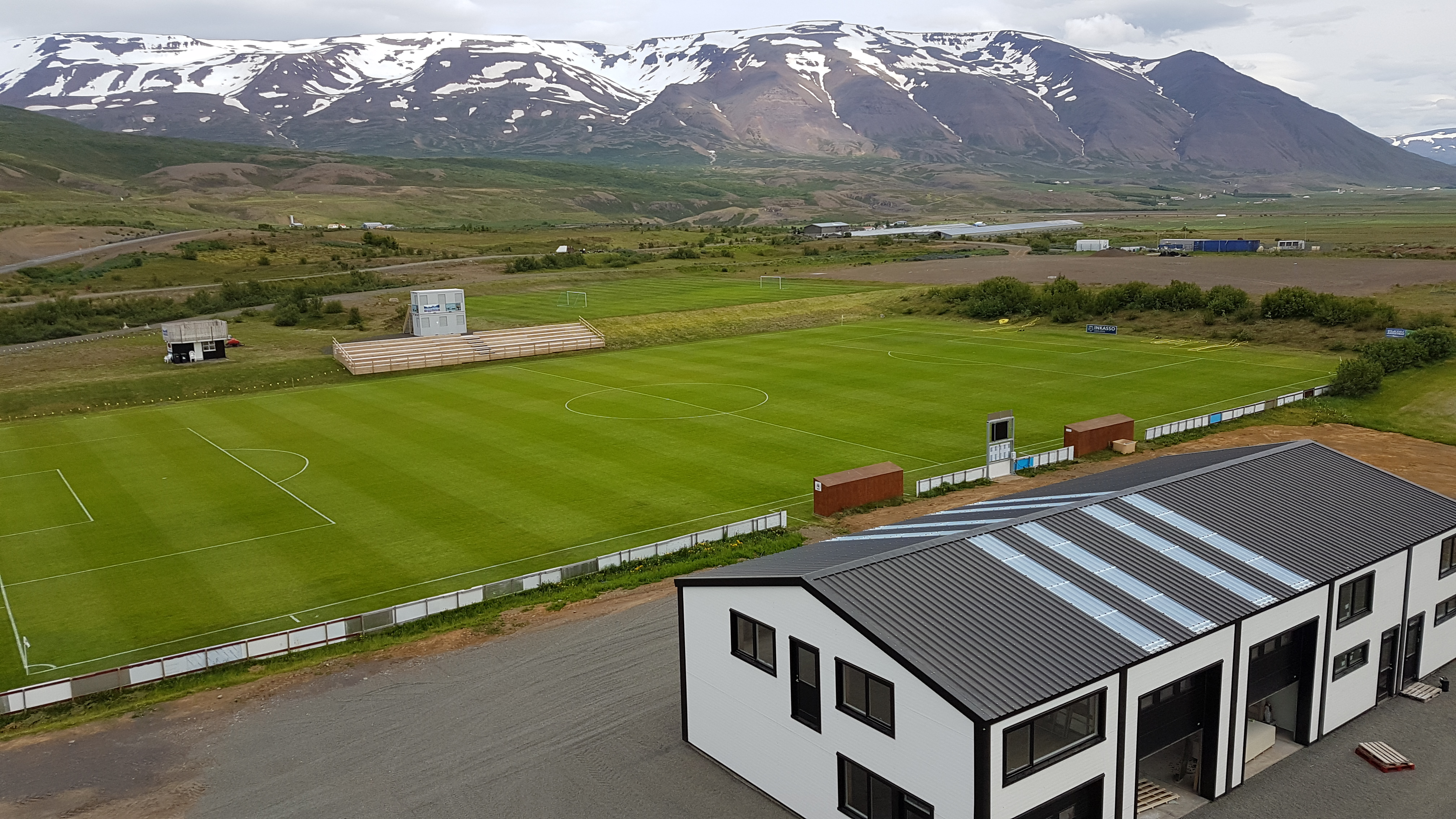
A picture of the field as well as their new facilities taken by Gunnar Guðmundsson.

Magni play their matches at Grenivíkurvöllur but also play at Boginn in Akureyri if the pitch condition is poor as is common during the preseason.

Seating and the new facilities were installed at Grenivíkurvöllur due to their promotion to the second tier of Icelandic football. The amount of seats are approximately 360 with plenty of space around the field as well.

There is also a smaller field on the east side of the main field which is mostly used by the future stars for practice.

== Statistics and Honors ==
1918 Won the Cup of the Quarters

1934 Won the Football tournament of the Northerners

1972 Promotion to 3.deild karla (at the time it was called the 2. league)

1990 Won 4.deild karla

2005/2006 Promotion to 2.deild karla

2014/2015 Promotion to 2. deild karla

2016/2017 Promotion to 1.deild karla

== Current squad ==
As of 13 August 2022

Note: Flags indicate national team as defined under FIFA eligibility rules; some limited exceptions apply. Players may hold more than one non-FIFA nationality.

No.	Pos.	Nation	Player
—	GK	ISL	Steinar Adolf Arnþórsson
—	GK	SRB	Vladan Dogatović
—	GK	ISL	Steingrímur Ingi Gunnarsson
—	DF	ISL	Tómas Örn Arnarson
—	DF	ISL	Alexander Ívan Bjarnason
—	DF	POL	Arkadiusz Grzelak
—	DF	ISL	Adam Örn Guðmundsson
—	DF	ISL	Birkir Már Hauksson
—	DF	ISL	Ottó Björn Óðinsson
—	DF	ISL	Ingólfur Birnir Þórarinsson
—	MF	ISL	Halldór Mar Einarsson
—	MF	ISL	Tómas Veigar Eiríksson

No.	Pos.	Nation	Player
—	MF	ISL	Kári Gautason
—	MF	ISL	Oddgeir Logi Gíslason
—	MF	ISL	Þorgeir Ingvarsson
—	MF	ISL	Þorsteinn Ágúst Jónsson
—	MF	ISL	Kristófer Óskar Óskarsson
—	MF	ISL	Guðni Sigþórsson
—	MF	ISL	Jón Óskar Sigurðsson
—	MF	BEL	Jordy Vleugels
—	FW	IRL	Jesse Devers
—	FW	ISL	Angantýr Máni Gautason
—	FW	ISL	Kristinn Þór Rósbergsson

== Staff ==
As of 12 October 2019

Position	Name
Chairman	Þorsteinn Þórmóðsson
CEO	Gísli Gunnar Oddgeirsson
Vice Chairman	Stefán Hrafn Stefánsson
Board Member	Jón Helgi Pétursson
Tresurer	Arnþór Pétursson
Coach	Sveinn Þór Steingrímsson
Assistant coach	Anton Orri Sigurbjörnsson
Assistant coach	Baldvin Ólafsson
