= Dalvík/Reynir =

- Full name: Knattspyrnufélagið Dalvík/Reynir
- Nickname: Dalvík
- Founded: 2006
- Ground: Dalvíkurvöllur, Dalvík, Iceland
- Capacity: 2000
- Chairman: Garðar Níelsson
- Manager: Dragan Stojanovic
- League: 2. deild karla
- 2025: 2. deild karla, 5th of 12
Home colours	Away colours

Dalvík/Reynir (Icelandic pronunciation: [ˈtalˌviːk ˈreiːnɪr̥]) is a professional Icelandic football club based in Dalvík. The club was formed in 2006 after the merger between UMFS Dalvík & Reynir Árskógsströnd

== History ==
In 2006 UMFS Dalvík and Reynir Árskógsströnd joined forces to form a new club, Dalvík/Reynir, after Leiftur and Dalvík broke up their cooperation that had formed Leiftur/Dalvík and lasted only four years. This was actually the second time Dalvík and Reynir joined, they first did so in the early 1990s but that time the didn't officially join, Reynir withdrew from the football league and most of the players and staff joined Dalvík. After Dalvík and Leiftur formed Leiftur/Dalvík, Reynir resurfaced and joined the league again with mostly young players from Dalvík that weren't in the Leiftur/Dalvík regular squad.

=== First season (2006) ===
Dalvík/Reynir entered the Icelandic football league's third and bottom division in 2006. The first season started well with the club winning its first two matches, drawing the third and winning the fourth. The team couldn't maintain that good start and missed out on playing in the promotion play-offs even after a late surge, winning the last three games including at home against play-offs rivals Magni. Even though Dalvík/Reynir were only two points after Magni and level on points with Leiknir F. before the final day they were already out of the play-offs race since Höttur had already secured the top spot and Leiknir and Magni would meet on the final day with both teams having a far better goal difference than Dalvík/Reynir meaning that no matter how that match would end, one of the two would beat Dalvík/Reynir by either a goal difference or points.

=== 2007 season ===
The 2007 season did not start well. Two away losses, first against a supposedly weaker team Vinir and then Leiknir F., one of the strongest teams in the group, meant important points were lost early in the very short season. The team never really recovered properly after that and after three draws in their last four games the team finished fourth in the group, losing out on a good chance to gain a promotion as five teams were promoted to the second division in 2007 because the premier division and second division were being expanded.

=== 2008 season ===
Prior to the 2008 season the coaches in the division were asked by football site Fotbolti.net to predict the results of the division and Dalvík/Reynir were predicted to win the group. Hopes were pretty high having secured the return of Jóhann Hreiðarsson from Þróttur R. and Hermann Albertsson from Víkingur R. The season started reasonably with one win and one loss but everything went downwards after that, the team only managed 4 wins that season and were never really in the contention for the top two spots that would go into the promotion play-offs, finishing third, nine points behind second placed Huginn.

=== 2009 season ===
On 19 November 2008 it was announced that Jóhann Hreiðarsson would take over as player/coach after Örlygur Þór Helgason left to become general manager of KA. The season didn't start well, three losses in the first four matches meant that Dalvík/Reynir would be playing catch-up all season. Despite being unusually strong away and winning all but two matches away that wasn't enough because the home form failed.

Despite the weak start the team managed to fight back and have their fate in their own hands with two matches left but a draw at home against group winners and league champions Völsungur meant they had to win away against Draupnir and rely on Huginn not winning away against Einherji. Dalvík/Reynir did their part, winning 1–5 but Huginn proved to strong for Einherji that had only won one of their last five games leading up to the final day. So, yet again, third place in the group.

=== 2010 season ===
One week after the end of the 2009 season, the club announced that Jóhann Hreiðarsson would be stepping down as coach by mutual consent because of other work commitments. On 25 September Atli Már Rúnarsson was announced as the new coach. Atli had played for Dalvík for a few seasons before moving to Þór Akureyri.

== Ground ==
Dalvík/Reynir plays its home matches on Dalvíkurvöllur but during spring some matches may be played at Árskógsvöllur if Dalvíkurvöllur is not considered ready for use.

Dalvíkurvöllur has no officially set capacity because Icelandic regulations don't require that, rules do require grounds in the top two divisions to have a minimum capacity in the form of fixed separate seats but Dalvíkurvöllur currently doesn't fulfill that requirement. There are 100 seats at the ground and fixed standing places for at least 300 people.

== Statistics and records ==
=== Team ===
The highest league placing the club has gained is third place in the third division group (9th–12th overall) in 2006, 2008 and 2009.

- Most league goals scored in a season: 34 in 2009 (15 matches).
- Fewest league goals scored in a season: 20 in 2006 (12 matches).
- Fewest league goals conceded in a season: 12 in 2006 (12 matches).
- Most league goals conceded in a season: 22 in 2009 (15 matches).

The club reached the final qualifying round (last 22) in the Icelandic Cup (FA Cup) but lost 0–4 at home against Þór Akureyri in 2007.

=== Players ===
- Most league goals in a season: Jóhann Hreiðarsson, 9 in 2008.
- Most goals in a season, league and cup only:
- Most league goals total:
- Most goals total, league and cup:

== Players ==
=== Current squad ===
As of 24 July 2025 Note: Flags indicate national team as defined under FIFA eligibility rules; some limited exceptions apply. Players may hold more than one non-FIFA nationality.

No.	Pos.	Nation	Player
4	MF	ESP	Alejandro Zambrano
6	MF	ISL	Þröstur Mikael Jónasson
8	MF	ESP	Borja López
11	FW	ISL	Viktor Daði Sævaldsson
15	MF	ISL	Bjarmi Fannar Óskarsson
16	MF	ISL	Tómas Þórðarson
17	MF	ISL	Gunnlaugur Rafn Ingvarsson
18	DF	ISL	Rúnar Helgi Björnsson
19	FW	ISL	Áki Sölvason
20	MF	ISL	Aron Máni Sverrisson
—	MF	ISL	Hákon Atli Aðalsteinsson

No.	Pos.	Nation	Player
—	MF	ISL	Hjörtur Freyr Ævarsson
—	DF	POR	Miguel Gonçalves
—	MF	ISL	Bjarmi Már Eiríksson
—	FW	FRA	Rémi Emeriau
—	MF	ISL	Sævar Þór Fylkisson
—	MF	ISL	Alex Máni Gærdbo Garðarsson
—	MF	ISL	Úlfur Berg Jökulsson
—	MF	ISL	Sindri Sigurðarson
—	FW	POR	Martim Cardoso
—	GK	ISL	Auðunn Ingi Valtýsson

Position	Name	Nationality
Manager	Hördrur Jónsonn	Icelandic
