= Vængir Júpíters =

Icelandic multi-sports club from Reykjavik

- Full name: Vængir Júpíters
- Ground: Fjölnisvöllur, Grafarvogur
- Capacity: 500
- Chairman: Helgi Þorsteinsson
- Manager: Arnar Páll Garðarsson
- League: 4. deild karla
- 2024: 3. deild karla, 12th of 12 (relegated)
Home colours	Away colours

Vængir Júpíters (Icelandic pronunciation: [ˈvaiŋcɪr̥ ˈjuːpiːtʰɛːr̥s], lit. 'Jupiter's Wings') is an Icelandic multi-sports club from the capital city, Reykjavík in the area of Grafarvogur.

== Basketball ==
The club won the 2. deild karla in 2013, achieving promotion to the 1. deild karla. They finished in 9th place in the 1. deild during the 2013–2014 season.

=== Titles ===
- 2. deild karla
  - 2013

== Football ==
The club men's football team plays in 3. deild karla. They participated in the ignaural season of the 4. deild karla in 2014 and won the league in 2015.

=== Titles ===
- 4. deild karla
  - 2015

== Futsal ==
After winning the national championship in 2018, Júpíter's futsal team participated in the preliminary rounds of the 2018–19 UEFA Futsal Champions League. The club repeated as champions in 2019.

=== Titles ===
- Icelandic champions
  - 2018, 2019

== Handball ==
Vængir Júpíters men's handball team participated in the 1. deild karla during the 2020–2021 season.
