= Knattspyrnufélag Vesturbæjar =

KV
- Full name: Knattspyrnufélag Vesturbæjar
- Founded: 17 September 2004
- Ground: KR-völlur, Reykjavík
- Capacity: 1,325
- League: 3. deild karla
- 2025: 3. deild karla, 7th of 12
Home colours	Away colours

Knattspyrnufélag Vesturbæjar (Icelandic pronunciation: [ˈkʰnahtˌspɪ(r)tnʏˌfjɛːˌlaːɣ ˈvɛstʏrˌpaiːjar], lit. 'Vesturbær Football Club'), commonly known as KV, is an Icelandic sports club from the capital city, Reykjavík in the area of Vesturbær. It is best known for its football team but has also fielded teams in other sports, such as basketball and handball. The club was founded in 2004.

== Men's football ==
=== Grounds ===
KV plays its games on the pitch next to Úrvalsdeild karla side, KR's KR-völlur.

=== History ===
In 2009 and 2011, the club was promoted to the 2. deild karla. The team finished 4th out of 12 teams in 2012, only one win from promotion to the 1. division. In 2013 the club was promoted to the 1. deild karla, the highest level the club has played at in its history.

=== Honours ===
- 2. deild karla
  - Runner-ups: 2013
- 3. deild karla
  - Winners: 2020
  - Winners: 2011
  - Runner-ups: 2009

== Basketball ==
=== Men's basketball ===
The KV men's basketball team was founded in 2007 and has played in the Icelandic basketball league system since the 2010-2011 2. deild karla season.

=== Women's basketball ===
In 2025, the club founded a women's basketball team and registered it for the 2025-2026 1. deild kvenna season.
