= Íþróttafélagið Höttur =

- Founded: 1952
- Team history: 1952; 74 years ago, as Ungmennafélagið Höttur; 1974; 52 years ago, as Íþróttafélagið Höttur
- Location: Egilsstaðir, Iceland
- Colors: black, white, red
- President: Ásthildur Jónasdóttir
- Website: hottur.is

Íþróttafélagið Höttur (Icelandic pronunciation: [ˈiːˌθrouhtaˌfjɛːˌlaijɪð ˈhœhtʏr̥], lit. 'Höttur Sports Club' (Note: Íþróttafélagið is the definite form of Íþróttafélag, meaning "the sports club".)) is an Icelandic sports club from Egilsstaðir in the center, of the east side of Iceland. It is primarily known for its basketball, football and track & field departments but also fields departments in badminton, gymnastics, handball, swimming, taekwondo and volleyball.

The club was founded in 1952 as Ungmennafélagið Höttur. On 19 February 1974 it merged with Knattspyrnufélagið Spyrnir and became Íþróttafélagið Höttur.

== Basketball ==
Höttur
- Founded: 1974
- Arena: Brauð&Co Höllin
- Website: hottur.is
Home	Away

=== Men's basketball ===
Since 2005, Höttur's men's basketball team has played periodically in the top-tier Úrvalsdeild karla.

=== Women's basketball ===
Höttur first fielded a women's team in 2019–2020 when it fielded a team in the third-tier 2. deild kvenna.

== Football ==
Höttur/Huginn
- Full name: Íþróttafélagið Höttur (ÍFH)
- Nickname: Höttur
- Founded: 1974; 52 years ago
- Ground: Vilhjálmsvöllur, Egilsstaðir, Iceland
- Capacity: 500
- Chairman: Davíð Þór Sigurðsson
- Manager: (M) Viðar Jónsson
- League: 3. deild karla
- 2025: 2. deild karla, 12th of 12 (relegated)
Home colours	Away colours

The club plays its home games at Vilhjálmsvöllur, named after Vilhjálmur Einarsson, the most famous athlete from the area.

=== Men's football ===
Höttur men's team plays in 2. deild karla as of 2022.

In 2018, Höttur merged with Huginn Seyðisfjörður and the team started under the name Höttur/Huginn in the 3rd division in 2019.

=== Current squad ===
As of 25 July 2025

Note: Flags indicate national team as defined under FIFA eligibility rules; some limited exceptions apply. Players may hold more than one non-FIFA nationality.

No.	Pos.	Nation	Player
—	FW	ISL	Þórhallur Ási Aðalsteinsson
—	DF	ISL	Þór Albertsson
—	MF	ISL	Árni Veigar Árnason
—	DF	ESP	Genís Arrastraria
—	DF	ISL	Kristján Jakob Ásgrímssson
—	MF	ISL	Bjarki Nóel Brynjarsson
—	FW	ISL	Sæbjörn Guðlaugsson
—	FW	ISL	Bjarki Fannar Helgason
—	DF	ISL	Valdimar Brimir Hilmarsson
—	GK	ESP	Gerard Iborra

No.	Pos.	Nation	Player
—	MF	ISL	Ívar Logi Jóhannsson
—	MF	ESP	Rafa Llop
—	DF	ISL	Eyþór Magnússon
—	MF	ISL	Stefán Ómar Magnússon
—	FW	SRB	Danilo Milenković
—	MF	ISL	Björgvin Stefán Pétursson
—	MF	ISL	Kristófer Máni Sigurðsson
—	MF	GUA	André Solórzano
—	FW	ISL	Kristófer Páll Viðarsson
—	MF	ISL	Sæþór Ívan Viðarsson

==== Achievements ====
- 2. deild karla:
  - 2nd place 2011 (Promotion)
- 3. deild karla: 3
  - 1993, 2006, 2014
- Icelandic Men's Football Cup 2009, 4th round (final 16), drew 1–1 to Breiðablik, lost 3–1 after extra time.

Breiðablik went all the way, and won the 2009 Cup.

=== Women's football ===
Höttur women's team plays in 2. deild kvenna as of 2018. It fields a joint team with Fjarðarbyggð and Ungmennafélagið Leiknir under the name Fjarðab/Höttur/Leiknir. In 2017 it finished 7th in the 2. deild kvenna.
