= Knattspyrnufélag Garðabæjar =

KFG
- Full name: Knattspyrnufélag Garðabæjar
- Founded: 2008
- Ground: Samsung völlurinn, Garðabær
- Capacity: 1,500
- Chairman: Lárus Guðmundsson
- Manager: Björn Másson and Kristján Másson
- League: 2. deild karla
- 2025: 2. deild karla, 10th of 12
Home colours	Away colours

Knattspyrnufélag Garðabæjar (Icelandic pronunciation: [ˈkʰnahtˌspɪ(r)tnʏˌfjɛːˌlaːɣ ˈkarðaˌpaiːjar], lit. 'Garðabær Football Club'), abbreviated as KFG, is an Icelandic football club based in Garðabær. It was founded in 2008. The club plays in 3. deild karla.

== Current squad ==
As of 25 July 2025

Note: Flags indicate national team as defined under FIFA eligibility rules; some limited exceptions apply. Players may hold more than one non-FIFA nationality.

No.	Pos.	Nation	Player
—	MF	ISL	Helgi Snǣr Agnarsson
—	FW	ISL	Kári Vilberg Atlason
—	MF	ISL	Adrián Baarregaard Valencia
—	FW	ISL	Jón Arnar Barðdal
—	FW	SRB	Đorđe Biberčić
—	MF	ISL	Guðmundur Ísak Bóasson
—	MF	GHA	Adrían Nana Boateng
—	FW	ISL	Eyþór Örn Eyþórsson
—	MF	ISL	Dagur Óli Grétarsson
—	FW	ISL	Elvar Máni Guðmundsson
—	DF	ISL	Ólafur Bjarni Hákonarson
—	FW	ISL	Jóhannes Breki Harðarson
—	MF	ISL	Bóas Heimisson
—	GK	ISL	Guðmundur Rafn Ingason

No.	Pos.	Nation	Player
—	DF	ISL	Guðmundur Thor Ingason
—	FW	ISL	Kristján Ólafsson
—	MF	ISL	Magnús Andri Ólafsson
—	MF	ISL	Benedikt Pálmason
—	FW	ISL	Stefán Alex Ríkarðsson
—	DF	ISL	Ólafur Viðar Sigurðsson
—	MF	ISL	Jökull Sveinsson
—	MF	ISL	Róbert Kolbeins Þórarinsson
—	DF	ISL	Daníel Darri Þorkelsson
—	MF	ISL	Pétur Máni Þorkelsson
—	GK	ISL	Arnar Darri Þorleifsson
—	FW	ISL	Atli Freyr Þorleifsson
—	MF	ISL	Arnar Ingi Valgeirsson

== Kit evolution ==
2008–2014	2014–2017	2017–present

== Honours ==
Fjórðadeildinn (level 5)

- Promoted: 2016

Þriðjadeildinn (level 4)

- Promoted: 2018

== Top scorers by season ==
Season	Player	Goals	Apps	Ratio
2017	(Iceland) Aron grétar Jafetsson	11	14	0.72
2018	(Iceland) jolli	15	18	1.59

== Notable former players ==
As of June 2019

Note: Flags indicate national team as defined under FIFA eligibility rules; some limited exceptions apply. Players may hold more than one non-FIFA nationality.

No.	Pos.	Nation	Player
—	MF	ISL	Ellert Sigurþórsson
—	MF	ISL	Sindri Rósenkranz (currently focusing on his promising darts career)
—	MF	ISL	Andri Valur Ívarsson
—	FW	ISL	Brynjar Björn Gunnarsson
—	MF	ISL	Baldur Jónsson
—	FW	ISL	Garðar Jóhannsson
—	FW	ISL	Veigar Páll Gunnarsson
—	FW	ISL	Bjarni Pálmason
—	MF	ISL	Daði Kristjánsson
