= Augnablik Kópavogur =

Icelandic sports club

Augnablik
- Full name: Knattspyrnufélagið Augnablik
- Founded: 16 February 1983
- Ground: Fagrilundur
- Chairman: Sigmar Ingi Sigurðarson
- League: (M) 3. deild karla (W) 1. deild kvenna
- (M) 2025 (W) 2023: (M) 3. deild karla, 3rd of 12 (W) 1. deild kvenna, 10th of 10 (relegated)
Home colours	Away colours

Knattspyrnufélagið Augnablik (Icelandic pronunciation: [ˈkʰnahtˌspɪ(r)tnʏˌfjɛːˌlaijɪð ˈøyknaˌplɪːk], lit. 'Moment Football Club' (Note: Knattspyrnufélagið is the definite form of Knattspyrnufélag, meaning "the football club".)), commonly known as Augnablik (lit. 'moment, blink of an eye'), is a sports club in Kópavogur, Iceland. It was founded in 1981 by former Breiðablik players.

== Football ==
=== Men's football ===
As of 2020, Augnablik's men's team plays in 3. deild karla.

=== Women's football ===
In 2018, Augnablik's women's team placed first in 2. deild kvenna and won promotion to 1. deild kvenna.

==== Trophies and achievements ====
- 2. deild kvenna (1):
  - 2018

== Basketball ==
Augnablik BC
- History: Augnablik (–2015)
- Arena: Kórinn
- Location: Kópavogur, Iceland
- Team colors: Green, red, white
- Championships: 1 Division II (2012)
Home	Away

During the 2000–2001 season, Augnablik men's basketball team finish fourth and last in 2. deild karla group B2. In 2012, it won the 2. deild karla championship after going 16–1 during the regular season and got promoted to the second-tier 1. deild karla for the 2012–2013 season. The club was relegated in 2014 after two seasons in 1. deild. The club has not fielded a team since finishing 7th in 2. deild in 2014–2015.

=== Trophies and achievements ===
- 2. deild karla (1):
  - 2011–12
