= Knattspyrnufélagið Ægir =

Icelandic sports club

Ægir
- Full name: Knattspyrnufélagið Ægir
- Founded: 6 December 1987; 38 years ago
- Ground: Þorlákshafnarvöllur, Þorlákshöfn, Iceland
- Capacity: 1,600
- Chairman: Guðbjartur Örn Einarsson
- Manager: Nenad Zivanovic
- League: 1. deild karla
- 2025: 2. deild karla, 1st of 12 (champions; promoted)
Home colours	Away colours	Third colours

Knattspyrnufélagið Ægir (Icelandic pronunciation: [ˈkʰnahtˌspɪ(r)tnʏˌfjɛːˌlaijɪð ˈaiːjɪr̥], lit. 'Ægir Football Club' (Note: Knattspyrnufélagið is the definite form of Knattspyrnufélag, meaning "the football club".)) is a professional Icelandic sports club from the town of Þorlákshöfn, mainly known for its football team. The club has a football team playing in 2.Deild Karla after being relegated from the Lengjudeild Karla in 2023.

== Players ==
=== Current squad ===
As of 15 August 2026

Note: Flags indicate national team as defined under FIFA eligibility rules; some limited exceptions apply. Players may hold more than one non-FIFA nationality.

No.	Pos.	Nation	Player
1	GK	GAM	Ibrahima Jallow
7	MF	ISL	Kristinn Ásgeir Þorbergsson
8	MF	ISL	Atli Rafn Guðbjartsson
9	FW	IRL	Jordan Adeyemo
11	DF	MNE	Stefan Dabetić
12	GK	USA	Gabriel Thull
14	MF	ISL	Benedikt Þór Viðarsson
15	MF	ISL	Sigurður Óli Guðjónsson
16	FW	ISL	Markús Máni Jónsson
17	DF	ISL	Hilmar Óli Viggósson
19	MF	ISL	Nikola Kristinn Stojanovic
20	DF	ISL	Alfredo Sanabria

No.	Pos.	Nation	Player
21	DF	ISL	Daníel Karl Þrastarson
22	FW	SCO	Harley Willard
23	MF	ISL	Sigurdur Pétur Stefánsson
24	DF	USA	Paul Skoczylas
25	GK	ISL	Haukur Logi Tryggvason (on loan from KR)
27	MF	ISL	Marko Panic
30	MF	ISL	Benedikt Darri Gunnarsson
45	MF	SRB	Dajan Ponjević
50	DF	FRA	Baptiste Gateau
66	MF	ISL	Sæmundur Hólm Gilbertsson
80	FW	ISL	Bjarki Rúnar Jónínuson
