= 304th Rescue Squadron =

304th Rescue Squadron

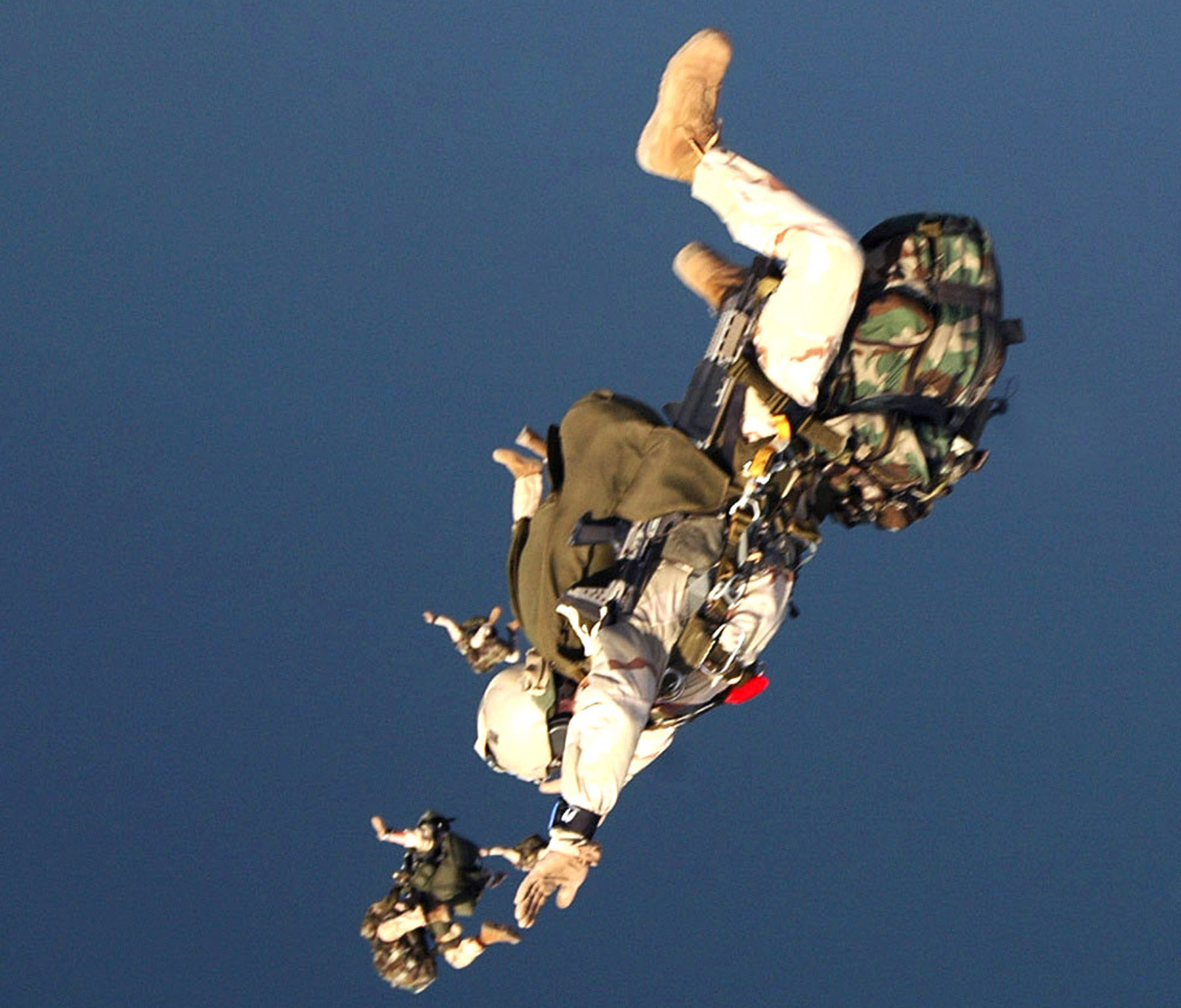
- Pararescuemen from the 304th Expeditionary Rescue Squadron free-fall during a high-altitude jump over the Gulf of Tadjoura, Africa,
- Active: 1957–present
- Country: United States
- Branch: United States Air Force
- Role: Search and Rescue
- Mottos: Non Pro Se Sed Aliis (Latin for 'Not for Self but for Others'); These Things We Do, That Others May Live
- Engagements: Persian Gulf War; Operation Allied Force; Operation Enduring Freedom; Operation Iraqi Freedom; Combined Joint Task Force - Horn of Africa
- Decorations: Air Force Outstanding Unit Award

Commanders
- Current commander: Lt. Col. Luc Chandou

Insignia
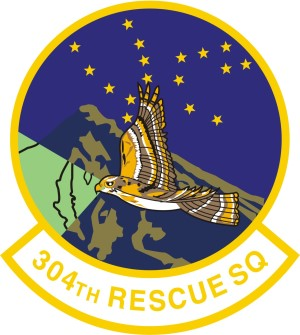
- 304th Rescue Squadron emblem (Note: Approved 7 October 1991. Significance; Blue and yellow are the Air Force colors. Blue alludes to the sky, the primary theater of Air Force operations. Yellow refers to the sun and the excellence required of Air Force personnel. The mountain terrain and night sky reflect the difficult conditions the Unit sometimes encounters during search and rescue operations. The stars as a constellation further allude to the navigational skills necessary to accomplish the mission. The hawk, with its keen eyesight and ability to soar, symbolizes the Unit's tireless efforts to search, and its diligent devotion to affect a rescue in any kind of weather. The green ray/beam denotes the night vision capabilities and advanced technical equipment in aircraft utilized by the squadron.)

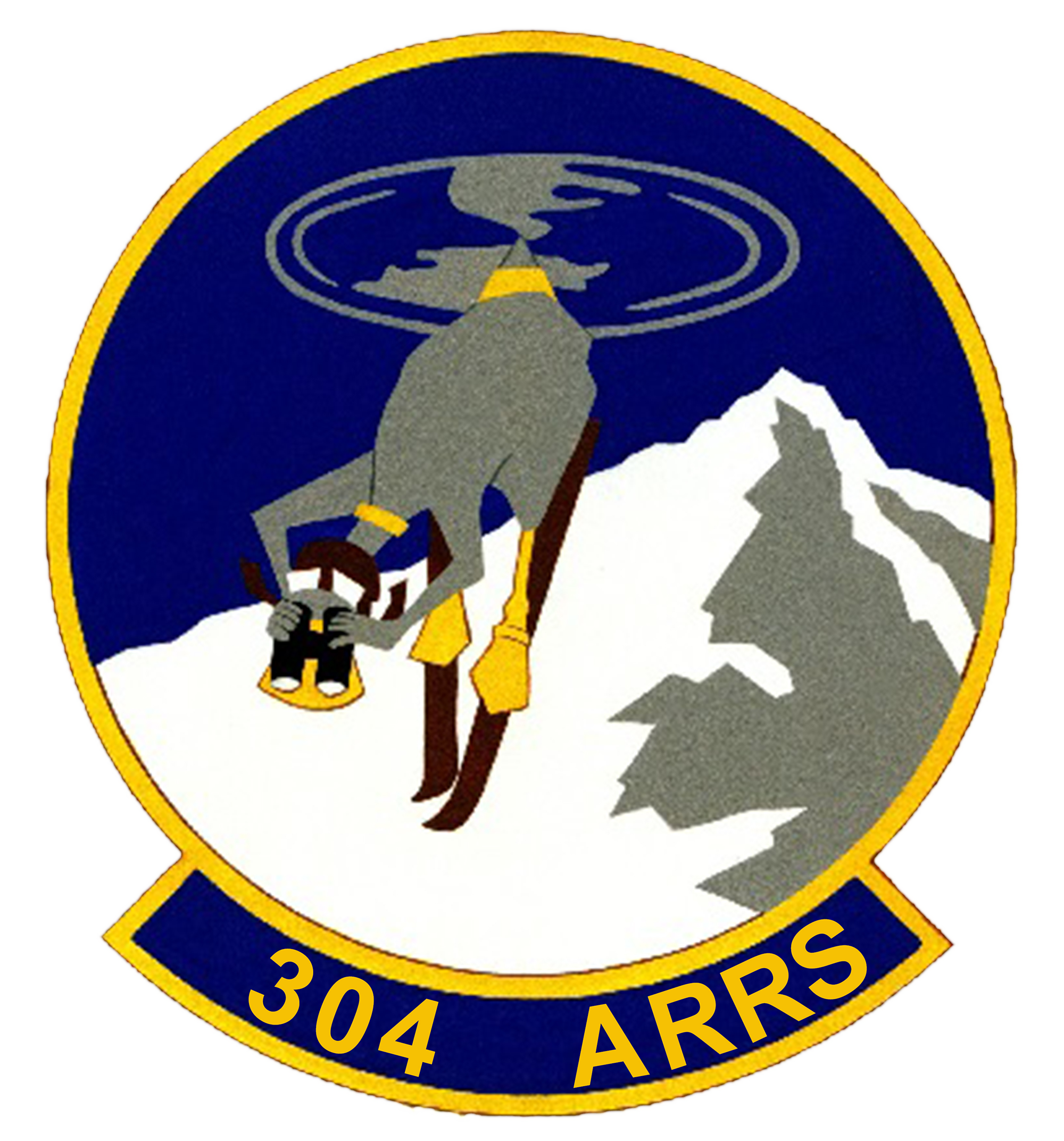
- 304th Aerospace Rescue & Recovery Squadron emblem (Note: Approved 11 October 1973. Description: On a blue disc a white mountain peak detailed gray issuing from base, overall a gray duck with twirling tail, yellow feet, bill and bands on tail and neck, wearing brown skis and military flying helmet with white goggles and looking through black binoculars; all within a narrow yellow border. Attached below the disc a blue scroll bordered yellow. Significance: Blue and yellow are the Air Force colors. Blue alludes to the sky, the primary theater of Air Force operations. Yellow refers to the sun and the excellence required of Air Force personnel. The duck with goggles and flight helmet portrays the early traditions of military aviation and its rescue role. The skis represent rescue from mountainous terrain indicated by the mountain in the background. The yellow band on the tail of the duck symbolizes the unit's historic ties to the Air Force global mercy mission when all rescue aircraft were so marked for international recognition.)

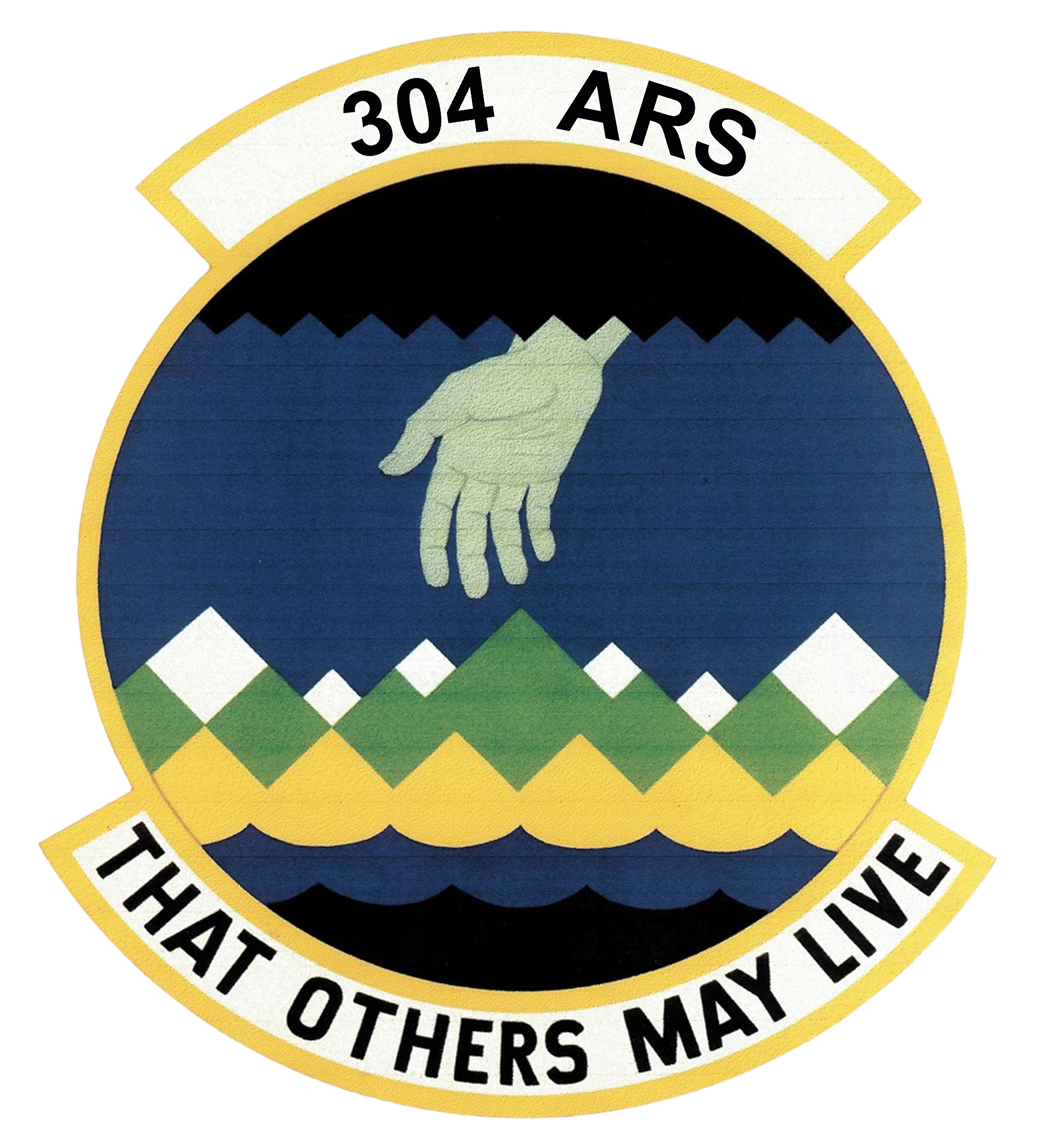
- 304th Air Rescue Squadron emblem (Note: Approved, 11 August 1961.)

The 304th Rescue Squadron is an Air Force Reserve Command combat search and rescue unit located at Portland Air National Guard Base, Oregon. The squadron is a geographically separated unit assigned to the 943d Rescue Group at Davis–Monthan Air Force Base, Arizona, and the 920th Rescue Wing at Patrick Space Force Base, Florida. First activated in 1957, the 304th has provided continuous search & rescue operations for over 65 years.

== Mission ==
The peacetime mission of the 304th is to train and maintain rescue capability for Department of Defense personnel, humanitarian and disaster relief activities. The 304th's wartime mission is to provide combat rescue capabilities to recover downed aircrew members and isolated personnel. The squadron can provide this capability under the harshest of circumstances to include, day/night, inclement weather and all terrain rescue conditions.

== History ==
The 304th has trained for combat search and rescue (CSAR) capability from its inception. The 304th was activated in the Reserves on 16 November 1957 at Portland IAP. In 1961, Pararescuemen (PJs) were added to the unit. Since then, the 304th has been training, equipping and employing Combat Rescue Officers, PJs, and support personnel worldwide in support of U.S. national security interests. It has performed aerial & ground search, rescue, and medical evacuation missions primarily in the Northwestern United States, including the suburban Portland, Oregon crash of United Flight 173 in Dec 1978, and conducting over 100 missions and 61 lives saved immediately following the Mount St. Helens volcanic eruption in May 1980. It maintained HC-130 Hercules, HH-3E Jolly Green Giant, HH-60 Pave Hawk aircrew, aircraft maintenance and helicopter air refueling capability from 1985 to 1997 and deployed to provide SAR coverage worldwide, including Keflavík International Airport, Iceland, during and after the Gulf War and to the Persian Gulf region from 1990 to 2003.

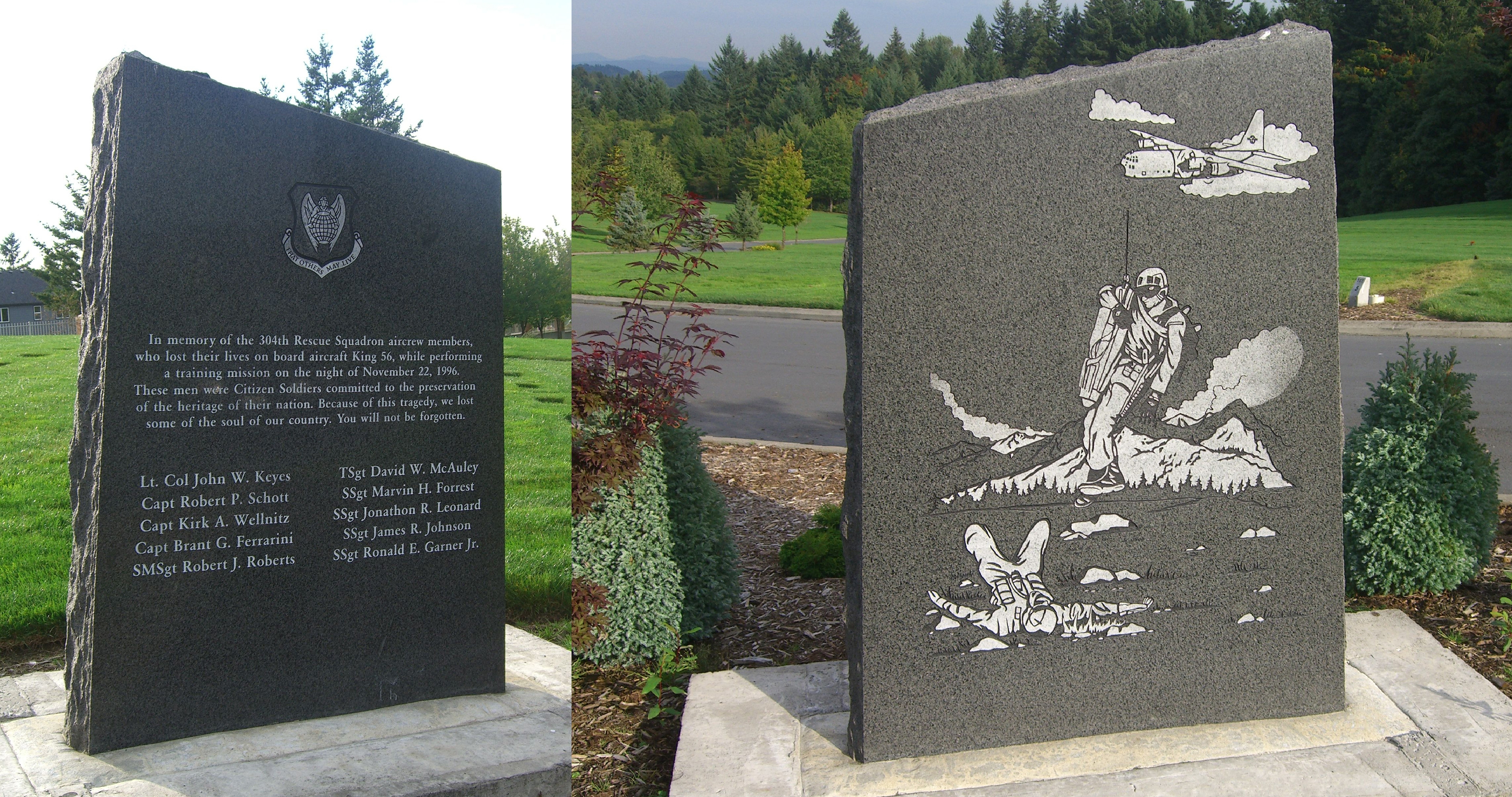
KING 56 304th RQS memorial

Tragedy struck the 304th on November 22, 1996, as KING 56, HC-130P S/N 64-14856, crashed into the Pacific Ocean approximately 50 nautical miles west of Point Mendocino off the California coast. The aircraft was enroute to NAS North Island at San Diego, California to conduct a routine overwater navigation evaluation. Ten of the eleven crewmembers perished: Lt. Col John W. Keyes, Capt Robert P. Schott, Capt Brant G. Ferrarini, Capt Kirk A. Wellnitz, SMSgt Robert J. Roberts, TSgt David W. McAuley, SSgt Marvin H. Forrest, SSgt Jonathon R. Leonard, SSgt James R. Johnson and SSgt Ronald E. Garner, Jr. The lone survivor, Airborne Communications Specialist TSgt Robert T. Vogel was later rescued by Coast Guard helicopter, all remaining crewmembers were likely killed on impact with only three crewmember remains eventually recovered. A formal USAF accident investigation was initiated to include review of the Flight Data Recorder, Cockpit Voice Recorder transcript and recovery of specific aircraft wreckage on the ocean floor at a depth of 5500ft. The mishap board determined the aircraft experienced a sequential four engine flame-out and subsequent electrical failure due to inadvertent fuselage fuel tank starvation. This unrecoverable condition resulted in an inability to restart engines, power-off glide and ocean impact in conditions of darkness. This mishap prompted a larger C-130 Broad Area Review which resulted in improvements to USAF C-130 flight safety, emergency procedures and aircrew training. On November 16, 2006, a formal ceremony was held and memorial erected at Willamette National Cemetery honoring the KING 56 crewmembers lost.

In May 1997, the 304th's HC-130P aircraft were transferred to the newly reactivated 303rd Expeditionary Rescue Squadron co-located at Portland Air National Guard Base. Later in 2003, the parent unit for the 304 RQS, the 939th Rescue Wing at Portland Air Reserve Station, transitioned from a CSAR mission to an air refueling mission. Re-equipped with KC-135 Stratotanker aircraft the wing was redesignated the 939th Air Refueling Wing (939 ARW) and its HC-130P and HH-60 aircraft were redistributed across the Air Force. With the loss of a flying mission, the 304 RQS converted into a GUARDIAN ANGEL unit and became a geographically separated unit (GSU) of the 943rd Rescue Group (943 RQG) at Davis-Monthan AFB, Arizona, the 943 RQG being a GSU of the 920th Rescue Wing (920 RQW) at Patrick AFB, now Patrick SFB, Florida.

== NASA Astronaut Recovery ==
Beginning in April 1981, the 304th provided NASA rescue support for the initial Space Shuttle Columbia STS-1 orbital flight test and numerous follow-on Space Shuttle missions, providing contingency sea rescue, East Coast Abort Landing (ECAL) and Transoceanic Abort Landing (TAL) site rescue assistance.

The 304th will maintain responsibility for recovery of upcoming NASA Commercial Crew Program, Artemis Program, Boeing Starliner, SpaceX Dragon, and Orion Multi-Purpose Crew Vehicle astronauts landed in U.S. spacecraft off American shores. For these missions, the squadron will have three teams ready.

During ascent for Starliner, SpaceX Dragon, and Orion Multi-Purpose Crew Vehicle, the 304th Rescue Squadron will have two teams stationed along the east coast of the United States, one at Patrick Space Force Base and the other in Charleston, South Carolina. The Patrick SFB team, (Rescue 1) will be responsible for on-pad aborts that place a capsule in the water or for aborts in the first few minutes of flight that places the capsule within a 200 nautical mile zone from the Cape. After that distance is exceeded, the Charleston crew (Rescue 2) would be responsible for rescue of a launch-aborting crew vehicle anywhere else across the Atlantic. The third team, stationed in Hawaii, (also part of Rescue 2) would be responsible for any after-launch immediate landing need or off-nominal Station return contingency that places a Starliner or Dragon in the Pacific. If an off-nominal from orbit return occurred with splashdown in the Atlantic, an emergency ocean return within 200 nautical miles of Cape Canaveral would fall to Rescue 1. Any other Atlantic splashdown would fall to Rescue 2 from Charleston because they have more powerful aircraft that could reach Starliner or Dragon or Orion quicker than the Patrick support craft.

Rescue 1 carries a requirement to have a crew enroute back to land within 6 hours of splashdown. Rescue 2 carries a requirement to have the hatch on a capsule opened within 24 hours of splashdown and a crew evacuated (via helicopter or ship) from the sea landing area within 72 hours of hatch open.

== Guardian Angel Operations ==
Since 1999, personnel from the 304 RQS have deployed in support of Operations Allied Force, Enduring Freedom, Iraqi Freedom, Combined Joint Task Force - Horn of Africa, Operation Inherent Resolve, and most recently, Operation Epic Fury providing Guardian Angel and Air Force special warfare teams for combat search and rescue and full spectrum personnel recovery. Concurrently stateside, the 304th continues to provide quick response to Pacific Northwest search & rescue requests from the Air Force Rescue Coordination Center, notably providing mountain rescue for injured or lost alpine climbers on Mount Hood and the surrounding Cascade Mountain Range.

== Lineage ==
- Constituted as the 304th Air Rescue Squadron on 24 October 1957

Activated in the reserve on 16 November 1957
Redesignated 304th Aerospace Rescue and Recovery Squadron on 18 January 1966
Redesignated 304th Air Rescue Squadron on 1 April 1990
Redesignated 304th Rescue Squadron on 1 February 1992

=== Assignments ===
- 2343d Air Reserve Flying Center, 16 November 1957
- 2346th Air Reserve Flying Center, 1 December 1957
- 2345th Air Reserve Flying Center, 8 April 1958
- Fourth Air Force, 8 April 1960
- Sixth Air Force Reserve Region, 1 September 1960
- Western Air Force Reserve Region, 31 December 1969
- 403d Aerospace Rescue and Recovery Wing (later 403d Rescue and Weather Reconnaissance Wing), 15 March 1976
- 939th Aerospace Rescue and Recovery Group (later 939th Air Rescue Wing, 939th Rescue Wing), 8 April 1985
- 939th Operations Group, 1 August 1992
- 920th Operations Group, 1 April 2003
- 943d Rescue Group, 12 February 2005 – present

=== Stations ===
- Portland International Airport, Oregon, 16 November 1957 – present

=== Aircraft ===
- Grumman SA-16 Albatross (later HU-16) (1958–1971)
- Sikorsky HH-34 (1971–1976)
- Bell HH-1 Huey (1976–1991)
- Bell UH-1 Huey (1979–1987)
- Lockheed HC-130 Hercules (1985–1997)
- Sikorsky HH-3E Jolly Green Giant (1986–1992)
- Sikorsky MH-60 Black Hawk (1991–1992)
- Sikorsky UH-60 Black Hawk (1991–1993)
- Sikorsky HH-60 Pave Hawk (1992–2003)
