= Patterson Field (Iceland) =

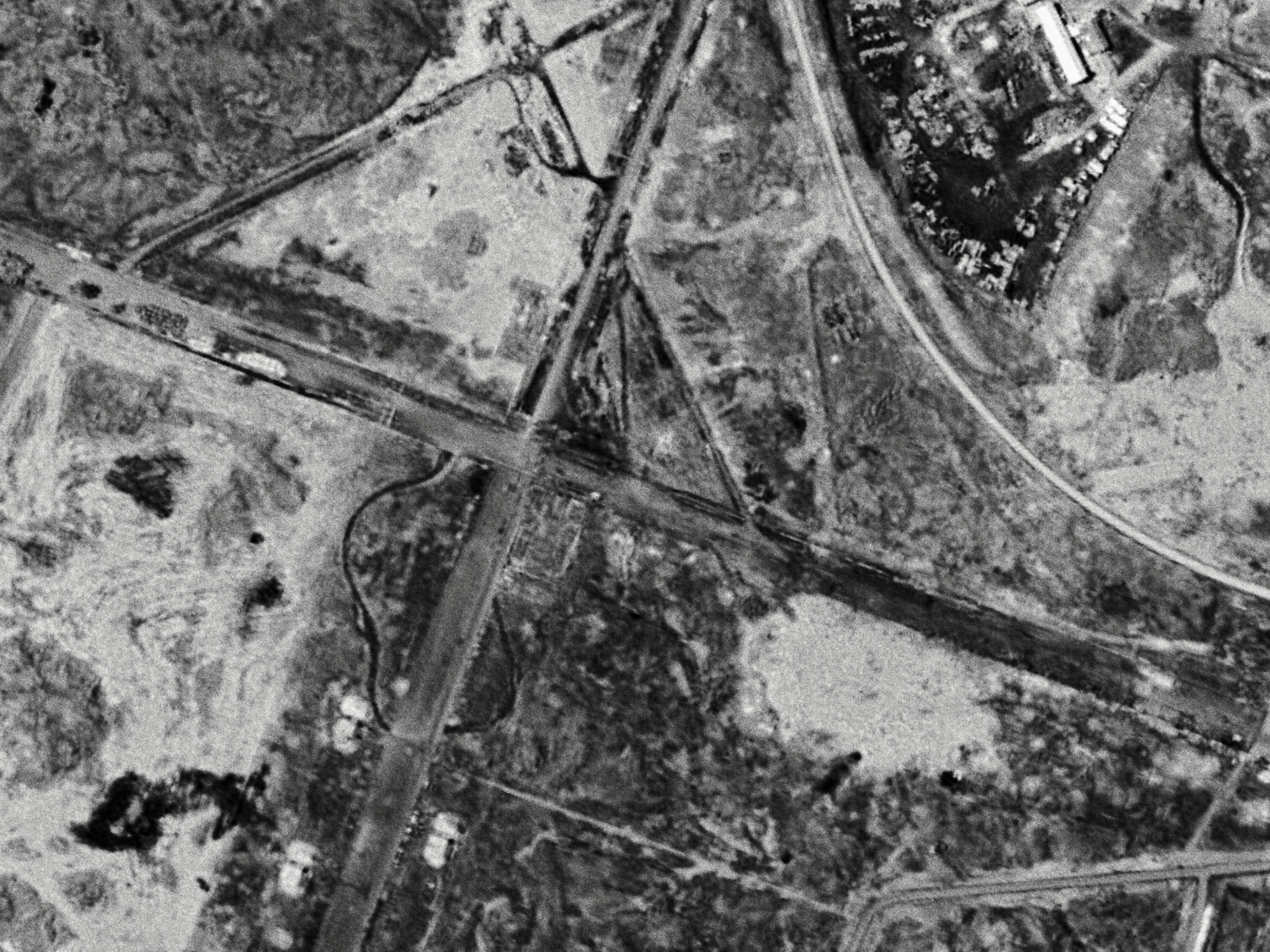
- Aerial Photo of Patterson field
- IATA: KEF; ICAO: BIKF

Summary
- Airport type: Naval Air Station/Military Airfield
- Owner: Icelandic Government
- Operator: United States Navy
- Serves: Reykjavík, Iceland
- Location: Reykjanesbær, Iceland
- Coordinates: 63°57′31″N 22°32′31″W

Map
- Location in Iceland

Patterson Field, is a former military airfield in Reykjanesbær (Reykjanes), Iceland. It is located around 3 km from Njarðvík.

Patterson Field was opened in 1942 but fell out of use in 1945 after the end of WWII. Meeks Field, now Keflavík International Airport, around 4 km northwest of Patterson field, was opened a year later in 1943 and remains in use.

== History ==
During World War II, the United States military constructed the airport as an alternative to a smaller British airstrip at Garður to the north. This new facility comprised two distinct airfields, each with two runways, positioned merely 4 km apart. The smaller Patterson Field's main mission was to provide air defence using fighter aircraft, while Meeks Field was to serve military transport for long distance traffic.

In 1942, Patterson Field, situated in the southeast, was inaugurated, albeit partially finished, and was dedicated to a young pilot who lost his life in Iceland.

=== Meeks Field ===
Meanwhile, Meeks Field (the current Keflavík Airport) located in the northwest, commenced operations on March 23, 1943. It bore the name of George Meeks, another young pilot who perished on the Reykjavík airfield. He was the first of over 200 American soldiers to be killed in Iceland during the war.

Following the war, Patterson Field was decommissioned. Meeks Field, and its adjacent facilities were handed over to Iceland, subsequently became Naval Air Station Keflavík after a defence agreement was signed between Iceland and the U.S. in 1951. In 2006, the U.S. closed the military base and is now Keflavík International Airport.
