= 943rd Rescue Group =

943rd Rescue Group

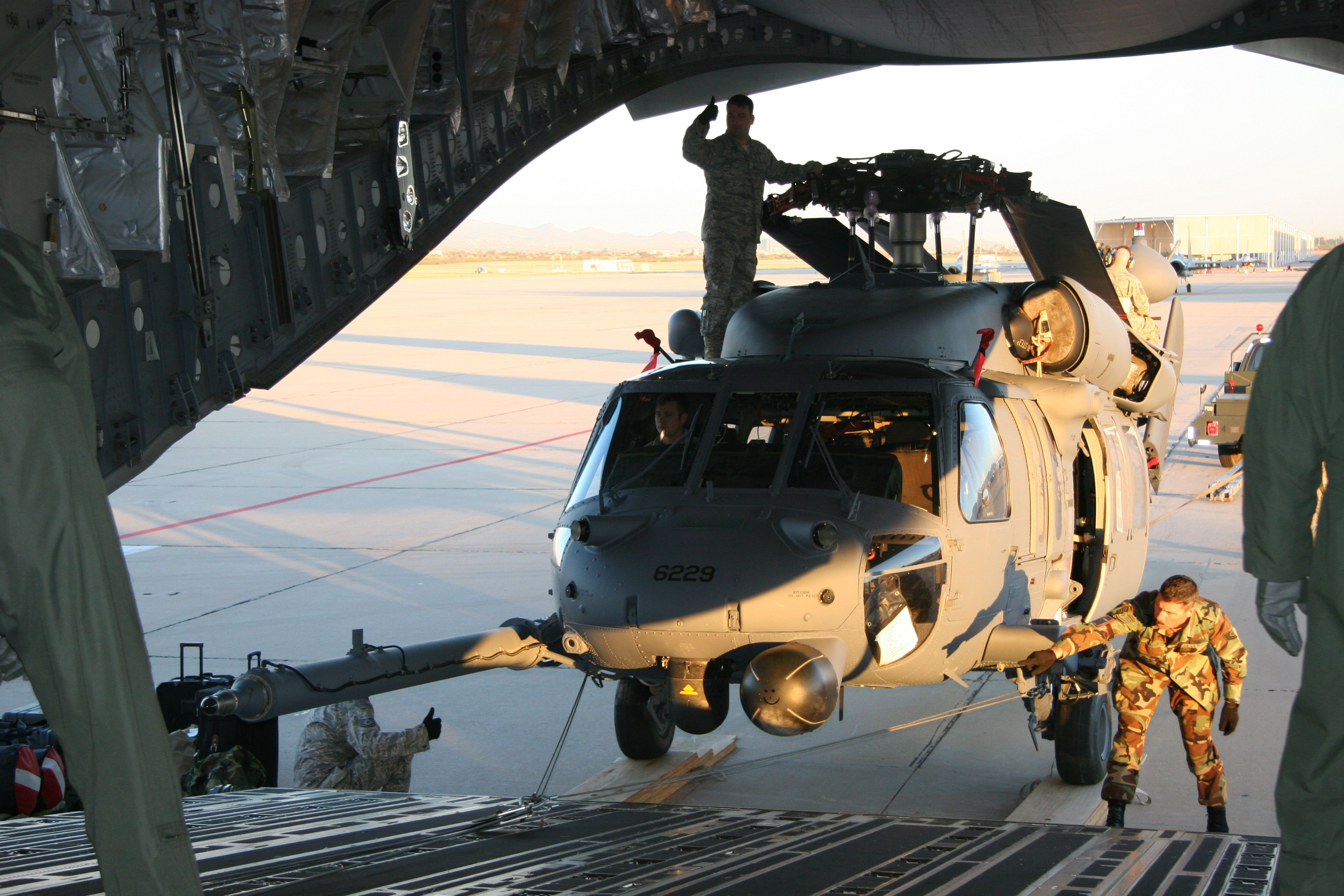
- Maintenance personnel from the 943rd Maintenance Squadron and aircrew from the 446th Airlift Wing use a winch on a C-17 to load an HH-60G Pave Hawk. (Note: Two helicopters were loaded and deployed to Patrick Space Force Base, Florida to augment launch and recovery coverage of Space Shuttle Discovery. In total, twenty reservists from the 943rd Rescue Group were deployed on the shuttle support mission.)
- Active: 1963–1969; 1969–1973; 1985–1993; 2005–present
- Country: United States
- Branch: United States Air Force
- Type: Group
- Role: Search and rescue
- Part of: Air Force Reserve Command
- Garrison/HQ: Davis-Monthan Air Force Base, Arizona
- Decorations: Air Force Outstanding Unit Award; Vietnamese Gallantry Cross with Palm

Commanders
- Current commander: Colonel Christopher Escajeda

Insignia
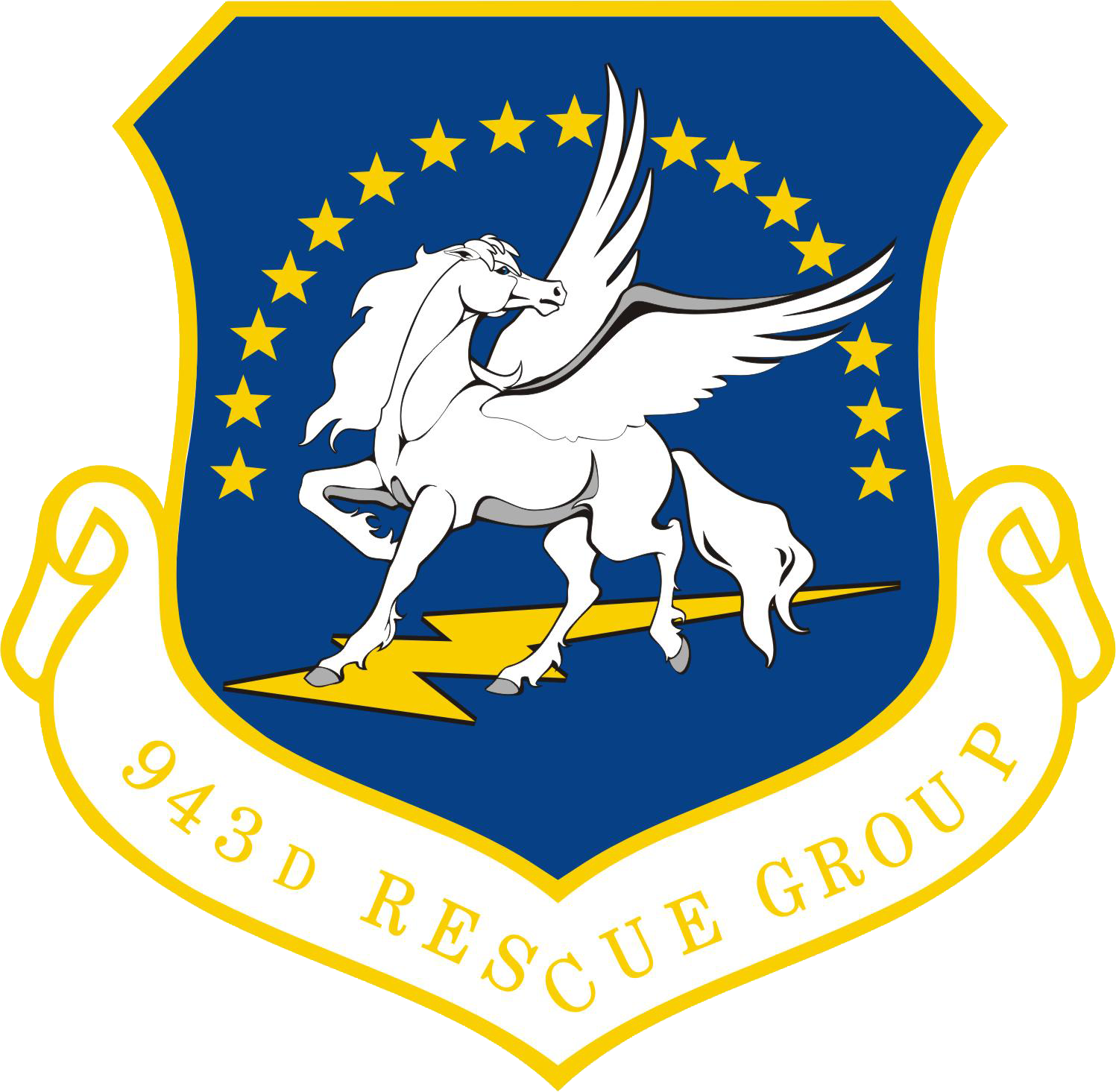
- 943rd Rescue Group emblem (Note: Approved c. 2005.)

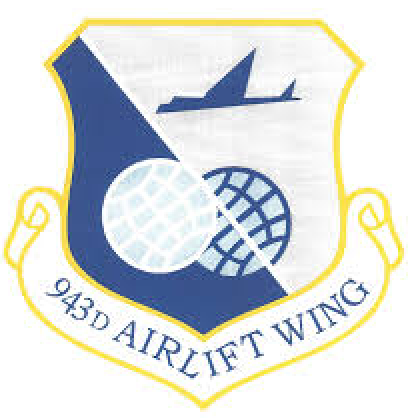
- 943d Military Airlift Group emblem] (Note: Approved 13 August 1969.)

The 943rd Rescue Group is a reserve component of the United States Air Force. It is assigned to Tenth Air Force under the Air Force Reserve Command and is stationed at Davis-Monthan Air Force Base, Arizona. The group and its subordinate squadrons are assigned to the 920th Rescue Wing based at Patrick Space Force Base, Florida.

== Mission ==
The mission of the 943rd Rescue Group is to provide leadership, management, policy formulation, planning, and standardization for operations, training and support of Air Force Reserve Command rescue assets, consisting of 3 squadrons and 3 flights at Davis-Monthan AFB and 1 additional squadron at Portland Air Reserve Station, Oregon. The group is equipped with six Sikorsky HH-60 Pave Hawk helicopters at Davis-Monthan Air Force Base to support worldwide combat rescue operations.

As an Air Force Reserve Command unit, the 943rd is under the control of the 920th Rescue Wing at Patrick Space Force Base, Florida and is the only Air Force Reserve rescue unit in the Southwestern United States. When mobilized, Air Combat Command directs group assets into theater to support wartime tasking and other operations, like humanitarian relief. United States Northern Command may gain group assets directly to support disaster relief, search and rescue tasking in the aftermath of catastrophic events like hurricane, tornado, wildfire, flooding and earthquake, when they occur in the US, or its territories.

== History ==
=== Need for Air Force Reserve troop carrier groups ===
After May 1959, the reserve flying force consisted of 45 troop carrier squadrons assigned to 15 troop carrier wings. (Note: There were an additional four rescue squadrons not assigned to the wings. Cantwell, p. 156.)The squadrons were not all located with their parent wings, but were spread over thirty-five Air Force, Navy and civilian airfields under what was called the Detached Squadron Concept. The concept offered several advantages. Communities were more likely to accept the smaller squadrons than the large wings and the location of separate squadrons in smaller population centers would facilitate recruiting and manning. However, under this concept, all support organizations were located with the wing headquarters. Although this was not a problem when the entire wing was called to active service, mobilizing a single flying squadron and elements to support it proved difficult. This weakness was demonstrated in the partial mobilization of reserve units during the Berlin Crisis of 1961. To resolve this, at the start of 1962, Continental Air Command, (ConAC) determined to reorganize its reserve wings by establishing groups with support elements for each of its troop carrier squadrons. This reorganization would facilitate mobilization of elements of wings in various combinations when needed.

=== Activation of the 943rd Troop Carrier Group ===
As a result, the 943rd Troop Carrier Group was established at March Air Force Base, California on 17 January 1963 as the headquarters for the 729th Troop Carrier Squadron, which had been stationed there since October 1960. Along with group headquarters, a Combat Support Squadron, Materiel Squadron and a Tactical Infirmary were organized to support the 729th. The group was equipped with Fairchild C-119 Flying Boxcars for Tactical Air Command airlift operations.

The group was one of four C-119 groups assigned to the 452nd Troop Carrier Wing in 1963. The others were the 942nd and 944th Troop Carrier Groups, also at March, and the 945th Troop Carrier Group at Hill Air Force Base, Utah.

The group flew routine tactical airlift missions in the western states, inactivating its Flying Boxcars in 1969. It then was moved east to Charleston Air Force Base, South Carolina, where it was updated to the Lockheed C-141 Starlifter heavy intercontinental transport. The group's crews augmented Military Airlift Command units for strategic airlift missions worldwide, including contingency and humanitarian operations and took part in strategic mobility exercises for training. Inactivated in 1973 as part of an Air Force Reserve reorganization.

Reactivated at March Air Force Base in 1985 with Lockheed C-130 Hercules transports. Inactivated in 1993 when the Air Force Reserve acquired C-141 Starlifter aircraft from the Regular Air Force that were moved to March as part of the 1994 BRAC closure of nearby Norton Air Force Base. Also pursuant to BRAC, March AFB was later renamed March Air Reserve Base in 1996.

=== Rescue Group ===
The 943rd Rescue Group was reactivated in the Air Force Reserve Command on 12 February 2005 at Davis-Monthan Air Force Base as a geographically separated unit of the 920th Rescue Wing.

== Lineage ==
- Established as the 943rd Troop Carrier Group, Medium and activated on 28 December 1962 (not organized)

Organized in the reserve on 17 January 1963
Redesignated 943rd Tactical Airlift Group on 1 July 1967
Inactivated on 25 April 1969

- Redesignated 943rd Military Airlift Group (Associate) on 31 July 1969

Activated in the reserve on 25 September 1969
Inactivated on 1 July 1973

- Redesignated 943rd Tactical Airlift Group on 8 January 1985

Activated in the reserve on 1 April 1985
Redesignated 943rd Airlift Group on 1 February 1992
Inactivated on 30 June 1993

- Redesignated 943rd Rescue Group on 13 January 2005

Activated in the reserve on 12 February 2005

=== Assignments ===
- Continental Air Command, 28 December 1962 (not organized)
- 452nd Troop Carrier Wing (later 452nd Military Airlift Wing), 17 January 1963 – 25 April 1969
- 514th Military Airlift Wing, 25 September 1969 – 1 July 1973
- 302nd Tactical Airlift Wing, 1 April 1985
- 445th Airlift Wing, 1 February 1992 – 30 June 1993
- 920th Rescue Wing, 12 February 2005 – present

=== Components ===
- 943rd Operations Group: 1 August 1992 – 30 June 1993
- 300th Military Airlift Squadron: 25 September 1969 – 1 July 1973
- 303rd Tactical Airlift Squadron (later 303rd Airlift Squadron): 1 April 1985 – 1 August 1992
- 304th Rescue Squadron: 12 February 2005 – present
- 305th Rescue Squadron: 12 February 2005 – present
- 306th Rescue Squadron: 12 February 2005 – present
- 701st Military Airlift Squadron: 25 September 1970 – 1 July 1973
- 707th Military Airlift Squadron: 1 October 1972 – 1 July 1973
- 729th Troop Carrier Squadron (later 729th Tactical Airlift Squadron): 17 January 1963 – 25 April 1969

=== Stations ===
- March Air Force Base, California, 17 January 1963 – 25 April 1969
- Charleston Air Force Base, South Carolina, 25 September 1969 – 1 July 1973
- March Air Force Base, California, 1 April 1985 – 30 June 1993
- Davis-Monthan Air Force Base, Arizona, 12 February 2005 – present

=== Aircraft ===
- Fairchild C-119 Flying Boxcar (1963–1969)
- Lockheed C-141 Starlifter (1969–1973)
- Lockheed C-5 Galaxy (1973)
- Lockheed C-130 Hercules (1985–1993)
- Lockheed HC-130 (2005–present)
- Sikorsky HH-60G Pave Hawk (2005–present)
