= Suðurnesjabær =

Municipality in southern Iceland

Coordinates: 64°01′N 22°39′W

- Location of the municipality in Iceland.

Government

Area
  - Total: 85.4 km^{2} (33.0 sq mi)

Population
  - Total: 3,588
  - Density: 42.0/km^{2} (109/sq mi)

Suðurnesjabær (Icelandic pronunciation: [ˈsʏːðʏrˌnɛːsjaˌpaiːr̥], "southern peninsula town") is a municipality on the northwest tip of Iceland's Southern Peninsula. It includes the towns of Sandgerði and Garður, and was created on 10 June 2018 from a merger of those two municipalities, with the name chosen by its residents the following November. It is the location of Keflavík International Airport, the country's largest airport (serving nearby Reykjavík), and it is adjacent to the town of Keflavík, in the municipality of Reykjanesbær.
