= Keflavík International Airport =

Largest airport serving Reykjavík, Iceland

Keflavík International Airport Keflavíkurflugvöllur

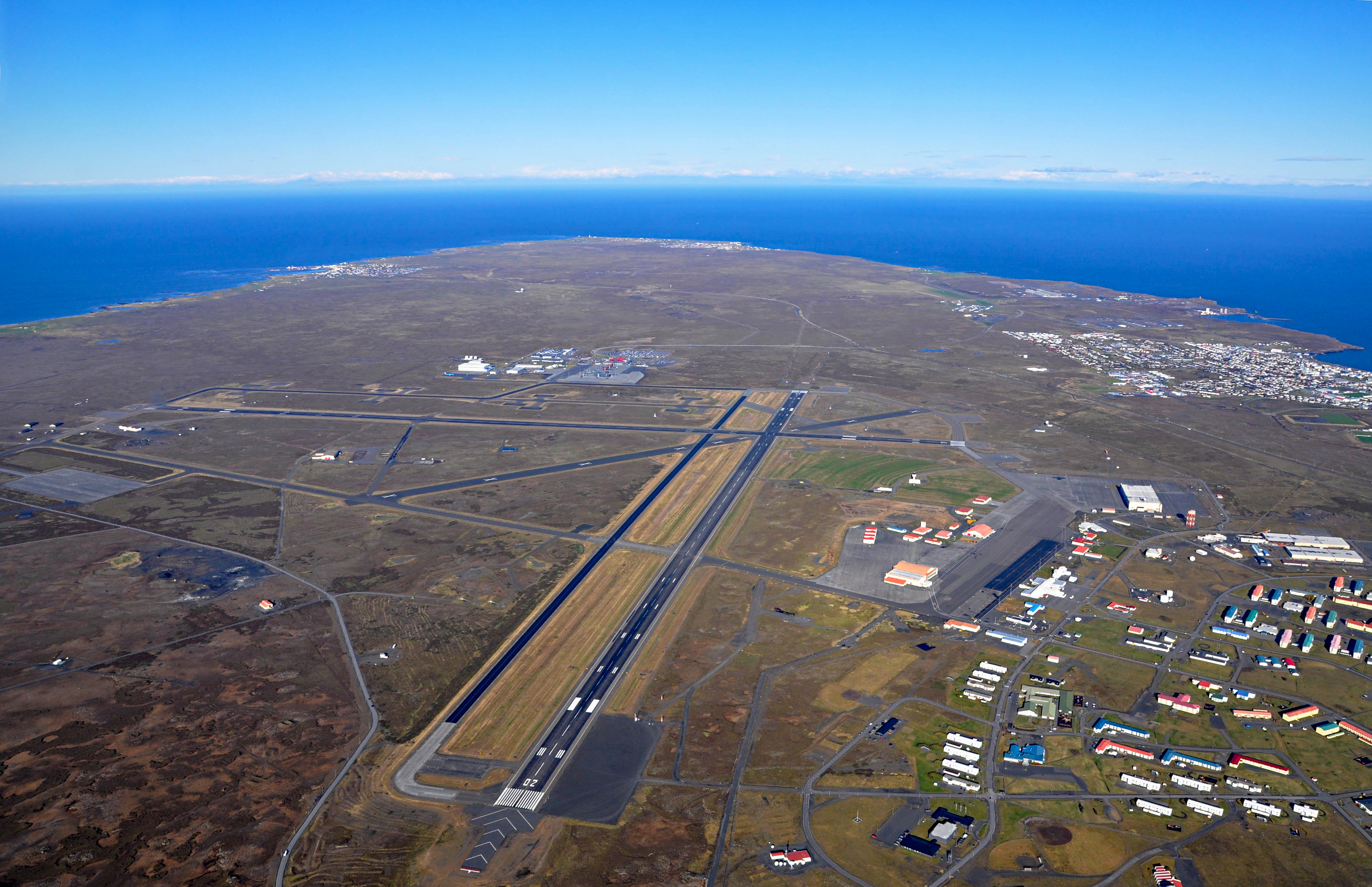
- IATA: KEF; ICAO: BIKF

Summary
- Airport type: Public
- Owner/Operator: Isavia ohf.
- Serves: Greater Reykjavík Area
- Location: Suðurnesjabær, Iceland
- Opened: 23 March 1943; 83 years ago
- Hub for: Icelandair
- Elevation AMSL: 52 m (171 ft)
- Coordinates: 63°59′06″N 22°36′20″W
- Website: www.kefairport.com

Map
- Location of airport in Iceland KEF/BIKF (Arctic) KEF/BIKF (Europe)

Runways
Direction	Length		Surface
Direction	m	ft	Surface
01/19	3,054	10,020	Asphalt
10/28	3,065	10,056	Asphalt

Statistics (2025)
- Total passengers: 8,159,461
- Passengers arriving or leaving the airport on land: 5,922,931
- Passengers arriving or leaving when transferring between flights: 2,236,530
- Sources: AIP Iceland at ICAA; Statistics: Isavia Limited

Keflavík International Airport (Icelandic: Keflavíkurflugvöllur [ˈcʰɛplaˌviːkʏrˌflʏɣˌvœtlʏr̥]; IATA: KEF, ICAO: BIKF), also known as Reykjavík–Keflavík Airport, is the largest airport in Iceland and the country's main hub for international transportation. The airport is located approximately 3 km (1.9 mi) west of the town of Keflavík, Reykjanesbær and 50 km (30 mi) southwest of the capital Reykjavík. The airport has two runways, each measuring approx. 3,050 m (10,010 ft). Most international journeys to or from Iceland pass through this airport, and it is the fifth busiest airport in the Nordic countries.

Keflavík is a hub for Icelandair and is served by 27 airlines as of 2025. The airport is only used for international flights; all domestic flights use the smaller Reykjavík Airport, which lies three kilometres (two miles) from Reykjavík's city centre. Keflavík Airport is operated by Isavia, a government enterprise.

== History ==
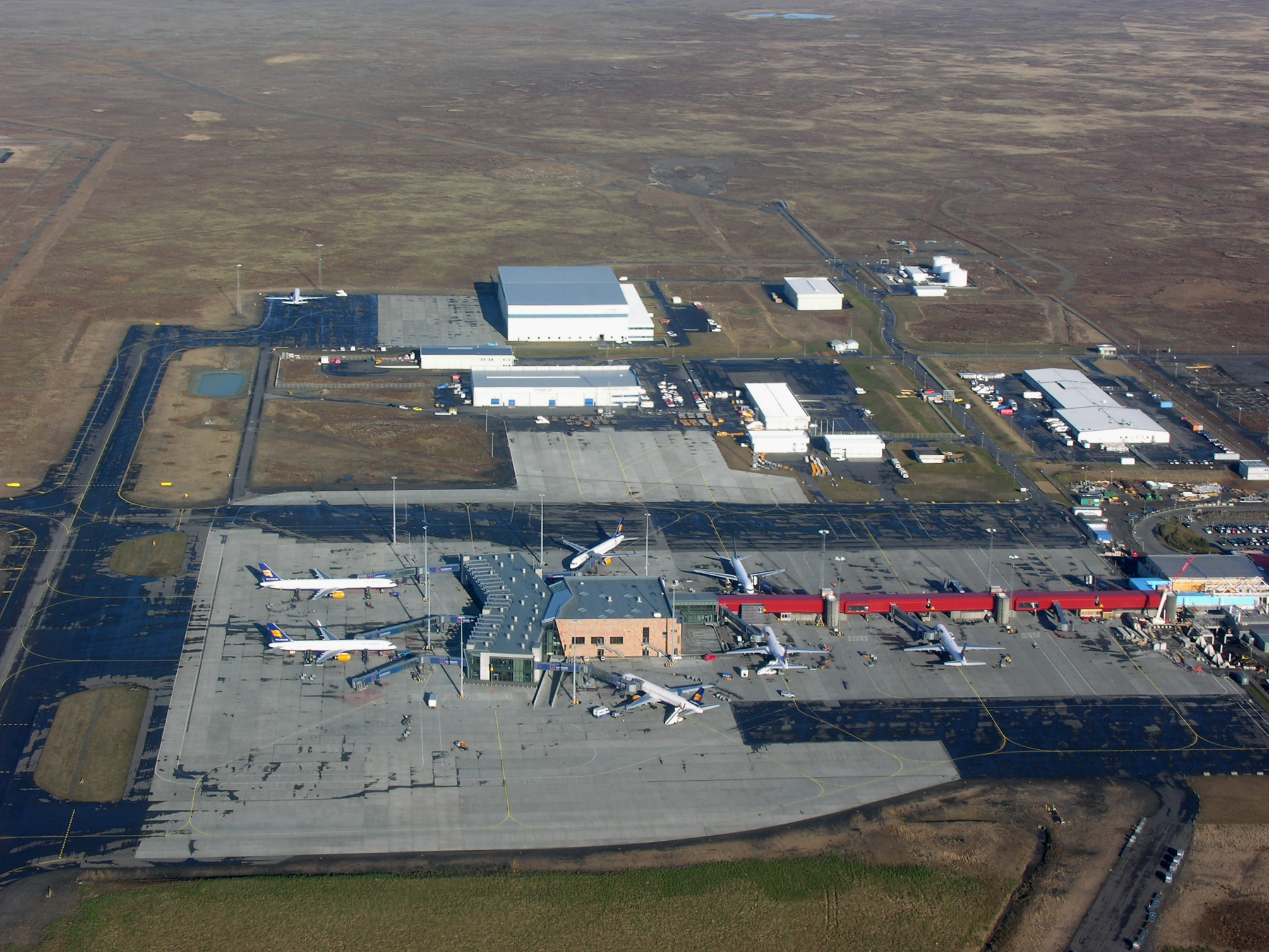
Aerial view of the main buildings in 2006.

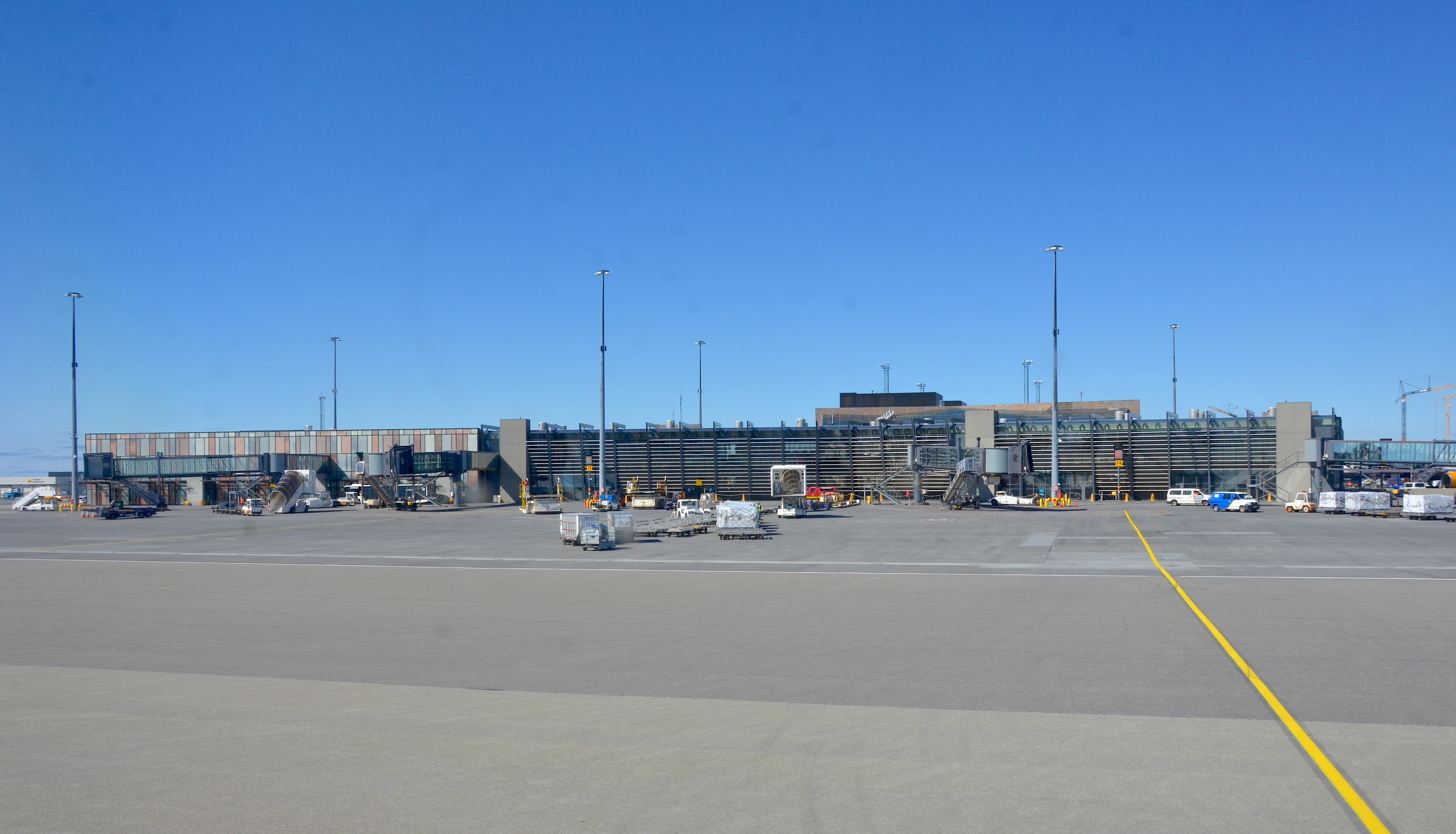
Terminal exterior

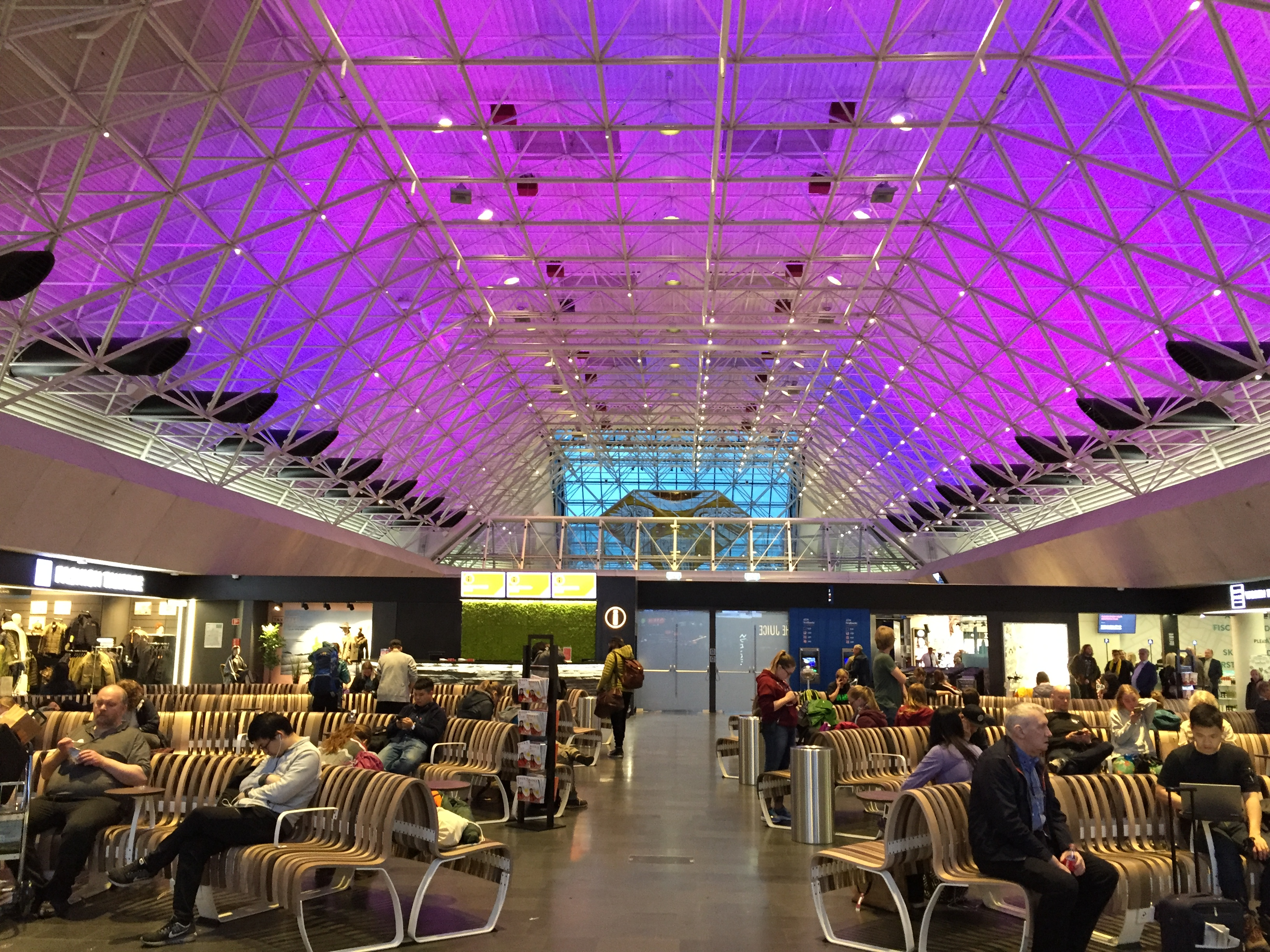
Terminal interior

=== Early years ===
Originally, the airport was built by the United States military during the military allied occupation of Iceland in World War II, as a replacement for a small British landing strip at Garður to the north. It consisted of two separate two-runway airfields, built simultaneously just 4 km (2.5 mi) apart. Patterson Field in the south-east opened in 1942 despite being partly incomplete. It was named after a young pilot who died in Iceland. Meeks Field to the north-west opened on 23 March 1943, where the airport is still located today. It was named after another young pilot, George Meeks, who died on the Reykjavík airfield. Patterson Field was closed after the war, but Meeks Field and the adjoining structures were returned to Iceland's control and were renamed Naval Air Station Keflavik, named after the nearby town of Keflavík.

In 1949, a passenger terminal was built by the Lockheed Overseas Aircraft Service. In its first years the passenger terminal was mostly used for troop transport as well as transatlantic technical stops; civilian airlines Icelandair and Loftleiðir were still based at the smaller Reykjavík Airport.

In 1951, the U.S. military returned to the airport under a defence agreement between Iceland and the U.S. signed on 5 May 1951.

=== Development since the 1960s ===
The presence of foreign military forces in Iceland under the NATO-sponsored Iceland–U.S. Defense Agreement of 1951 was controversial in Iceland, which had no military forces other than the Icelandic Coast Guard. During the 1960s and 1970s, rallies were held to protest the U.S. military presence in Iceland (and in particular at Keflavík), and every year protesters walked the 50-kilometre (30 mi) road from Reykjavík to Keflavík and chanted "Ísland úr NATO, herinn burt" (lit. 'Iceland out of NATO, the military away'). The protests were not effective.

==== Transition of flights from Reykjavík ====
Until the 1960s, the airlines Icelandair and Loftleiðir Icelandic were solely based at the smaller civilian Reykjavík Airport, which is situated within the city and did not have military access restrictions.

Loftleiðir took delivery of its first Canadair CL-44 aircraft in 1964 and Icelandair took delivery of a Boeing 727 as Iceland's first jet aircraft in 1967. These new aircraft were considered too large for regular operation on the shorter runway at Reykjavík Airport. Both airlines began operations of their new larger aircraft from the longer runway at Keflavík Airport, greatly increasing the civilian passenger traffic through the Keflavík terminal.

By the 1970s, almost all international traffic was moved to Keflavík, relegating Reykjavík Airport to serving domestic services and limited short-haul international traffic to Greenland and the Faroe Islands. The road from Reykjavík to Keflavík was newly rebuilt and paved by 1965 which greatly improved access to Keflavík Airport from the city.

==== New passenger terminal ====
The original Keflavík passenger terminal built in 1949 was located within the NASKEF military air base. Travellers therefore had to pass through military checkpoints to reach their flights.

Subsequently, in April 1987 the Icelandic government finished construction of a relocated civilian terminal which was located on the north side of the airport. The new terminal had separate access from the military area and was accessible without passing through the military area. The new terminal was named after Leif Erikson who was the first European to arrive in North America (Flugstöð Leifs Eiríkssonar, "Leif Erikson Air Terminal").

==== Other history ====
The two 3,000-metre-long (10,000 ft) and 60-metre-wide (200 ft) runways were large enough to support NASA's Space Shuttle as well as the Antonov An-225. On 29 June 1999, Concorde G-BOAA flew from Heathrow Airport to Reykjavík (Keflavik airport). The Concorde had been there earlier. Due to its location, the airport is also an important diversion landing site for large aircraft in transatlantic ETOPS operations.

=== Since 2000 ===
The terminal was extended with the opening of the South Building in 2001, to comply with the requirements of the Schengen Agreement. The North Building was enlarged and finished in 2007.

The United States military base, NASKEF, closed down in 2006 and was handed over to the Icelandic Government. The original Keflavík passenger terminal, built in 1949 and defunct since 1987, was demolished in 2018.

In 2014, a high-speed airport rail link to Reykjavík was proposed, which would be Iceland's first passenger railway. As of 2023, proposals have not progressed past the planning phase but the route is safeguarded in local and airport masterplans.

The airport was used as a hub by defunct airline WOW air (and earlier as Iceland Express) until it ceased operations on 28 March 2019. Similarly, it was the hub for the airline Play until they ceased operations on 29 September 2025

In September 2018, Atlantic Airways moved their operations from Reykjavík Airport to Keflavík Airport, as they transitioned to using Airbus A320 aircraft which are too large for Reykjavík Airport, having previously used Airbus A319 aircraft. Similarly, Icelandair moved all of their Greenland-bound flights from Reykjavík to Keflavík Airport in 2022, to allow easier onward connections.

In 2012, 2016–2019 and 2023, Icelandair operated a domestic service to Akureyri Airport, only available for international connecting passengers.

In 2016, the south terminal was expanded adding seven gates. The ramp area to the east of the airport was expanded in 2018, adding 13 remote stands. A new 1.2 km (0.75 mi) taxiway was constructed in 2023 by Isavia, which allows better aircraft traffic management at the airport.

==== Expansion since 2022 ====
The airport's masterplan provides a phased approach to eventually accommodate 15 million passengers per year, including a third runway, along with new terminal piers and an airport city.

A major expansion of the new eastern wing was opened in 2023–2025, increasing the terminal's total area by 30%, including an expanded arrivals hall including a new baggage reclaim hall, retail facilities, four new jet-bridge gates, two new remote-stand bus gates and new spaces for retail units, including a food hall.

As of 2024, a 1,900-square-metre (20,000 sq ft) expansion of the south terminal is also under construction, on its east side.

== Terminal ==
The airport has a single terminal, originally called Leifsstöð (named after explorer Leif Erikson). A total of 13 jet-bridge gates and 17 remote stands are available. The terminal is split into A, C and D gates. A gates are located closest to the main lounge along the main hallway. C-gates are located past the main hallway on the upper level of the south building. D-gates are non-Schengen gates on the lower level of the south building. Airside, past airport security, one emerges into the Schengen side of the terminal. To access flights to non-Schengen countries (including the UK and United States), one must pass through passport control.

== Airlines and destinations ==
=== Passenger ===
The following airlines operate regular scheduled and charter services to and from Keflavík:

Airlines	Destinations
Air Canada	Seasonal: Montréal–Trudeau, Toronto–Pearson
Air China	Beijing–Capital, Copenhagen
Air Transat	Seasonal: Montréal–Trudeau
airBaltic	Riga
Alaska Airlines	Seasonal: Seattle/Tacoma
American Airlines	Seasonal: Philadelphia (begins 28 May 2027)
arkia	Seasonal: Tel Aviv (begins 22 June 2026)
Atlantic Airways	Vágar
Austrian Airlines	Seasonal: Vienna
British Airways	London–Heathrow
Delta Air Lines	Seasonal: Boston (begins 12 April 2027), Detroit, Minneapolis/St. Paul, New York–JFK
Discover Airlines	Munich
easyJet	Edinburgh, London–Luton, Manchester, Milan–Malpensa, Paris–Charles de Gaulle; Seasonal: Basel/Mulhouse, Birmingham, Bristol, London–Gatwick, Lyon, Newcastle upon Tyne
Edelweiss Air	Zürich
Eurowings	Seasonal: Düsseldorf
Finnair	Helsinki
Iberia Express	Seasonal: Madrid
Icelandair	Alicante, Amsterdam, Baltimore, Barcelona, Bergen, Berlin, Boston, Brussels, Chicago–O'Hare, Copenhagen, Denver, Dublin, Edinburgh, Frankfurt, Gdańsk, Glasgow, Helsinki, Lisbon, London–Gatwick, London–Heathrow, Málaga, Manchester, Minneapolis/St. Paul, Munich, New York–JFK, Newark, Nuuk, Orlando, Oslo, Paris–Charles de Gaulle, Prague, Raleigh/Durham, Rome–Fiumicino, Seattle/Tacoma, Stockholm–Arlanda, Tenerife–South, Toronto–Pearson, Vágar, Vancouver, Washington–Dulles, Zürich; Seasonal: Billund, Faro, Geneva, Gothenburg, Gran Canaria, Ilulissat, Innsbruck, Istanbul, Kulusuk, Madrid, Miami, Milan–Malpensa, Nashville, Nice, Pittsburgh, Portland (OR), Qaqortoq, Salzburg, St. Louis (begins 14 May 2027), Tromsø, Venice, Verona
Jet2.com	Seasonal: Belfast–International, Birmingham, Bristol, East Midlands, Edinburgh, Glasgow, Leeds/Bradford, Liverpool, London–Stansted, Manchester, Newcastle upon Tyne
LOT Polish Airlines	Warsaw–Chopin
Lufthansa	Frankfurt
Neos	Seasonal: Alicante, Málaga, Tenerife–South, Verona
Norwegian Air Shuttle	Seasonal: Oslo
Scandinavian Airlines	Copenhagen, Oslo; Seasonal: Stockholm–Arlanda
TAP Air Portugal	Seasonal: Lisbon (begins 1 April 2027)
Transavia	Amsterdam, Paris–Orly
TUI Airways	Seasonal: London–Gatwick, Manchester
United Airlines	Seasonal: Chicago–O'Hare, Newark, Washington–Dulles
Vueling	Seasonal: Barcelona
WestJet	Seasonal: Calgary, Edmonton, Winnipeg
Wizz Air	Budapest, Gdańsk, Katowice, Milan–Malpensa, Rome–Fiumicino, Warsaw–Chopin, Wrocław; Seasonal: Vilnius

=== Cargo ===
Airlines	Destinations
AirExplore	Billund
Amerijet International	Miami
DHL Aviation	Cologne/Bonn, East Midlands
Icelandair Cargo	Boston, Liège, Los Angeles, New York-JFK
Silk Way West Airlines	Baku, Chicago–O'Hare, Mexico City-AIFA

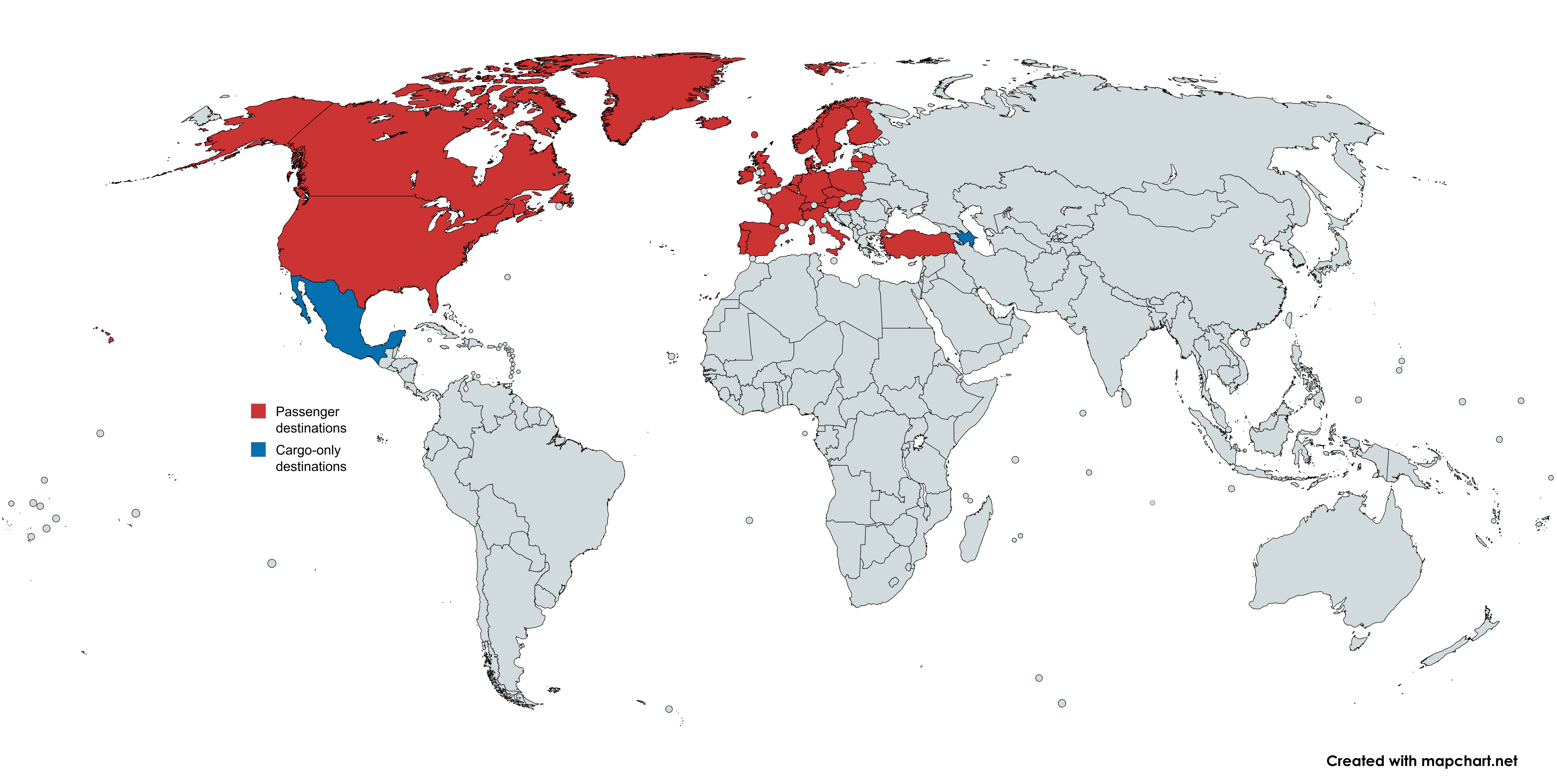
Red for passenger destinations, blue for cargo-only destinations.

== Statistics ==
Airport map

=== Passenger numbers ===
Year	Passengers	Change
2004	1,883,725	
2005	2,101,679	▲ +11.6%
2006	2,272,917	▲ +8.1%
2007	2,429,144	▲ +6.9%
2008	2,193,434	▼ -9.7%
2009	1,832,944	▼ -16.4%
2010	2,065,188	▲ +12.7%
2011	2,474,806	▲ +19.8%
2012	2,764,026	▲ +11.7%
2013	3,209,848	▲ +16.1%
2014	3,867,425	▲ +20.5%
2015	4,855,505	▲ +25.5%
2016	6,821,358	▲ +40.4%
2017	8,755,352	▲ +28.3%
2018	9,804,388	▲ +12.0%
2019	7,247,820	▼ -26.08%
2020	1,373,971	▼ -81.04%
2021	2,171,996	▲ +58.1%
2022	6,126,421	▲ +182.01%
2023	7,776,147	▲ +26.9%
2024	8,326,972	▲ +6.8%
2025	8,159,461	▼ -2.01%

=== Busiest destinations ===
Top 10 busiest routes from Keflavík in 2024
Rank	Airport	Passengers	Operator(s)
1	Copenhagen	555,821	Icelandair, Scandinavian Airlines
2	Amsterdam	370,472	Icelandair, Transavia
3	Paris–Charles de Gaulle	354,758	Icelandair
4	Boston	354,144	Icelandair
5	London–Heathrow	349,515	British Airways, Icelandair
6	Oslo	286,925	Icelandair, Norwegian, Scandinavian Airlines
7	New York–JFK	274,336	Delta, Icelandair
8	Frankfurt	248,169	Icelandair, Lufthansa
9	Manchester	213,870	easyJet, Icelandair, Jet2.com, TUI Airways
10	Washington–Dulles	211,779	Icelandair, United

== Ground transport ==
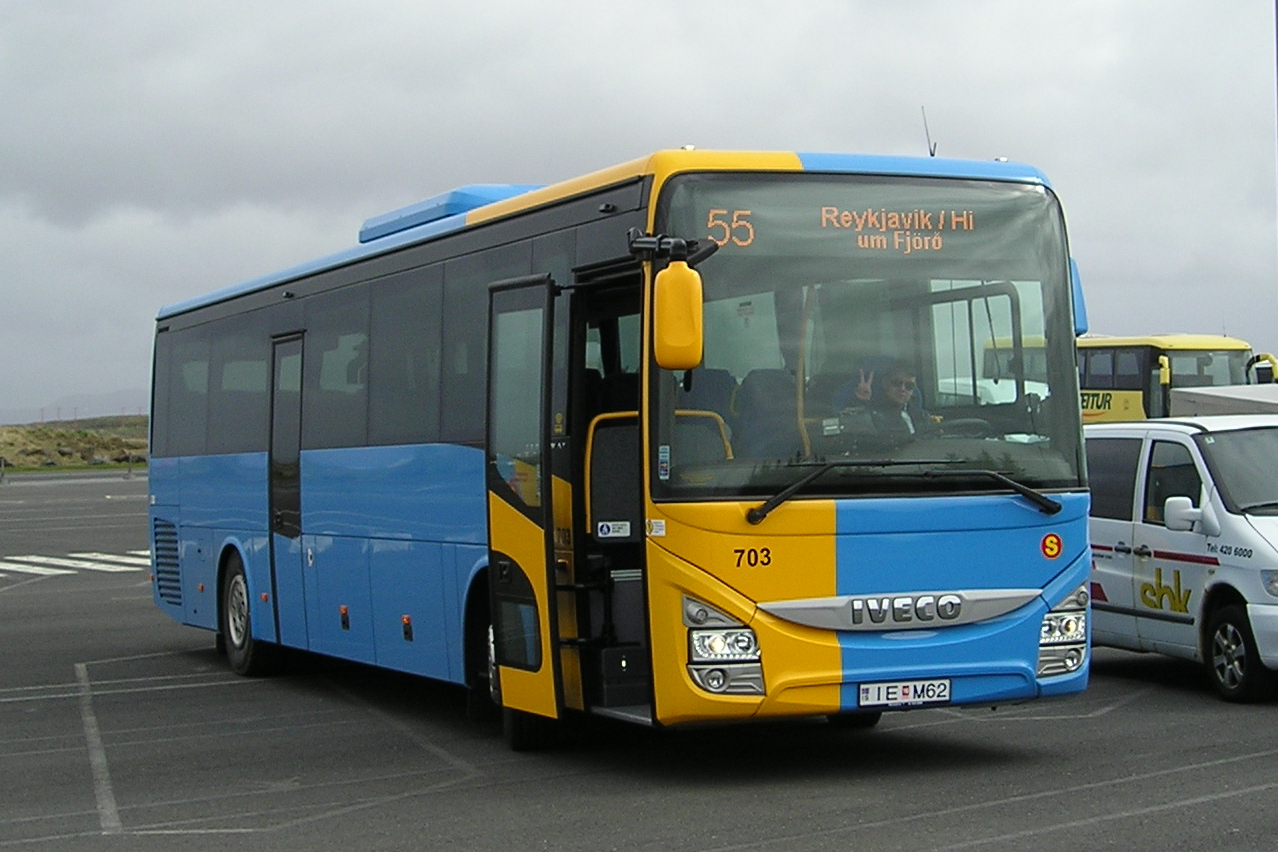
A Strætó bs bus serving the airport

=== Road ===
The airport is located approximately 3 km (1.9 mi) west of the town of Keflavík, Reykjanesbær. The airport is linked to downtown Reykjavík via a 50-kilometre (30 mi) journey on the Route 41 dual carriageway. Long-term and short-term parking is available at the airport. Taxis are available outside the terminal. Rental cars are available from various companies.

There is a separated pedestrian and bike path from the airport to the town of Keflavík, but not to Reykjavík.

=== Bus ===
Public buses are operated by Strætó bs on route 55 to Keflavík town and BSÍ bus station in central Reykjavík; the public bus stop is not located outside the airport terminal itself, but is located a few hundred metres away, near the car rental area.

=== Coach ===
Private companies Flybus, Airport Express and others operate express services to downtown Reykjavík, including to Reykjavík Airport as well as stops and transfers to hotels.

== Accidents and incidents ==
- On 21 July 2013, a Russian Sukhoi Superjet 100 airliner, prototype aircraft 97005, made a belly landing during a test flight. The cause was a crew mistake due to fatigue. They operated the plane manually in order to simulate failures.
- On 28 April 2017, a Primera Air Boeing 737-800 skidded off an icy runway.
- On 7 February 2020, an Icelandair Boeing 757-200 suffered a collapsed right main landing gear during touchdown on runway 10.
