= Sandgerði =

- Town
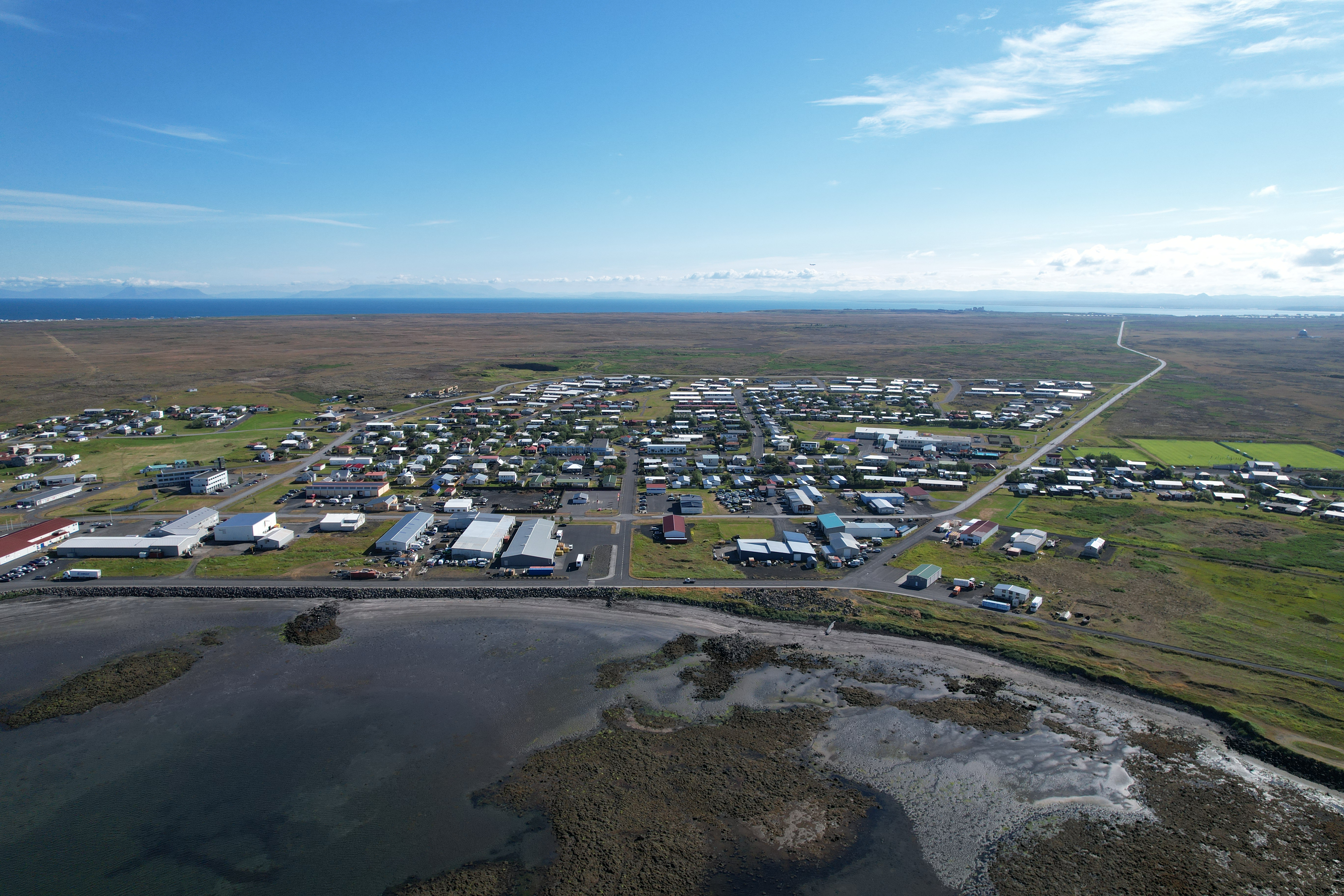
- Aerial view of Sandgerði

- Location within Iceland
- Coordinates: 64°3′11″N 22°42′15″W
- Country: Iceland
- Region: Southern Peninsula
- Constituency: Southwest Constituency
- Municipality: Suðurnesjabær

Government
  - Mayor: Sigrún Árnadóttir

Area
  - Total: 62 km^{2} (24 sq mi)

Population
  - Total: 1,609
  - Density: 25.95/km^{2} (67.2/sq mi)
- Postal code(s): 245
- Website: www.sudurnesjabaer.is

Sandgerði (Icelandic pronunciation: [ˈsantˌcɛrðɪ]), also known as Sandgerðisbær ([ˈsantˌcɛrðɪsˌpaiːr̥], lit. 'Sandgerði Town'), is a town in southwestern Iceland on the Southern Peninsula. It is part of the municipality of Suðurnesjabær, formed in 2018 when it merged with Garður.

Sandgerði began to develop as a fishing village in the second half of the nineteenth century as motorboats replaced row boats in the industry.

Reynir football club play in Iceland's third tier and their basketball team by the same name competes in the 3rd tier of basketball in Iceland as well.

Suðurnes Science and Learning Center is a museum and research center dedicated to natural science and related subjects.

The Sandgerði harbor
