= 303rd Expeditionary Rescue Squadron =

303d Expeditionary Rescue Squadron

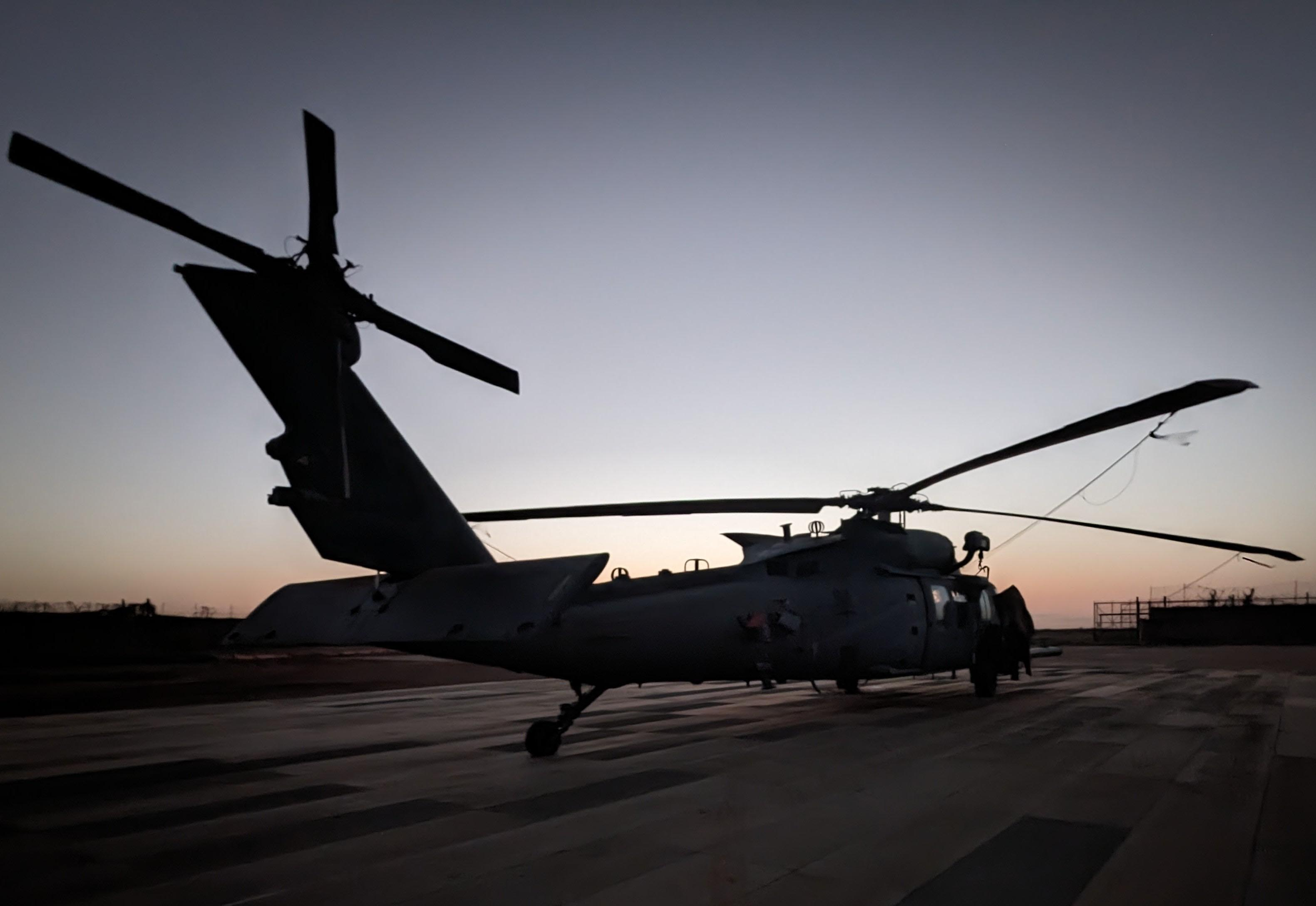
- A U.S. Air Force HH-60W Jolly Green II assigned to the 303rd ERQS sits alert at an undisclosed location in the Horn of Africa
- Active: 1956–1993; 1997–2003; 2013–present
- Country: United States
- Branch: United States Air Force
- Role: Search and Rescue
- Part of: United States Air Forces Europe
- Motto: Serviens Ut Servet Latin Serving To Save
- Mascot: Dumbo
- Engagements: Operation Allied Force; Operation Enduring Freedom; Operation Iraqi Freedom; Combined Joint Task Force - Horn of Africa
- Decorations: Air Force Outstanding Unit Award

Insignia
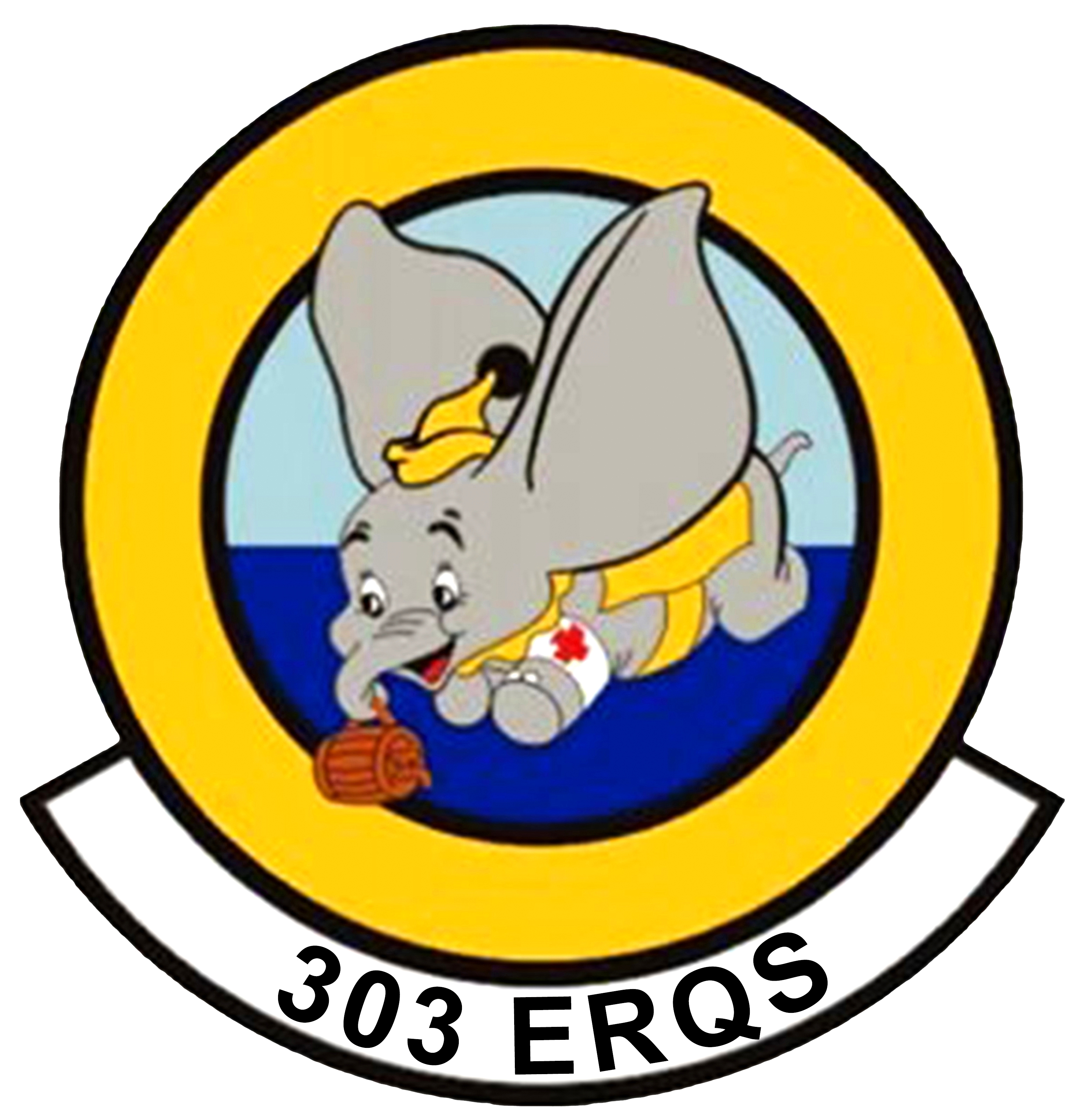
- 303d Expeditionary Rescue Squadron emblem (Modified, 22 July 2011)

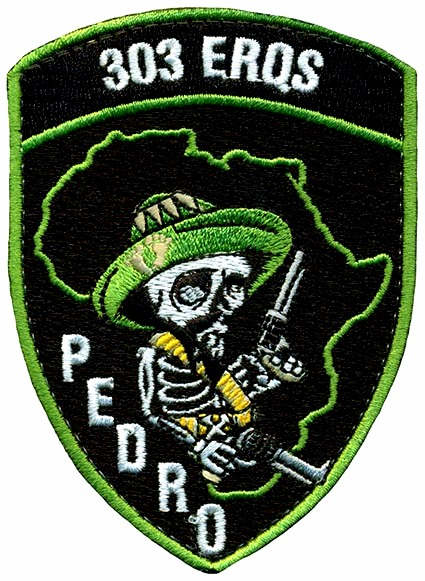
- 303d Expeditionary Rescue Squadron deployed emblem

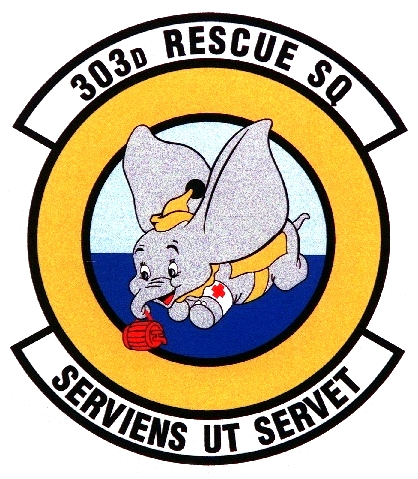
- 303d Rescue Squadron emblem (Reinstated, 1 April 1997)

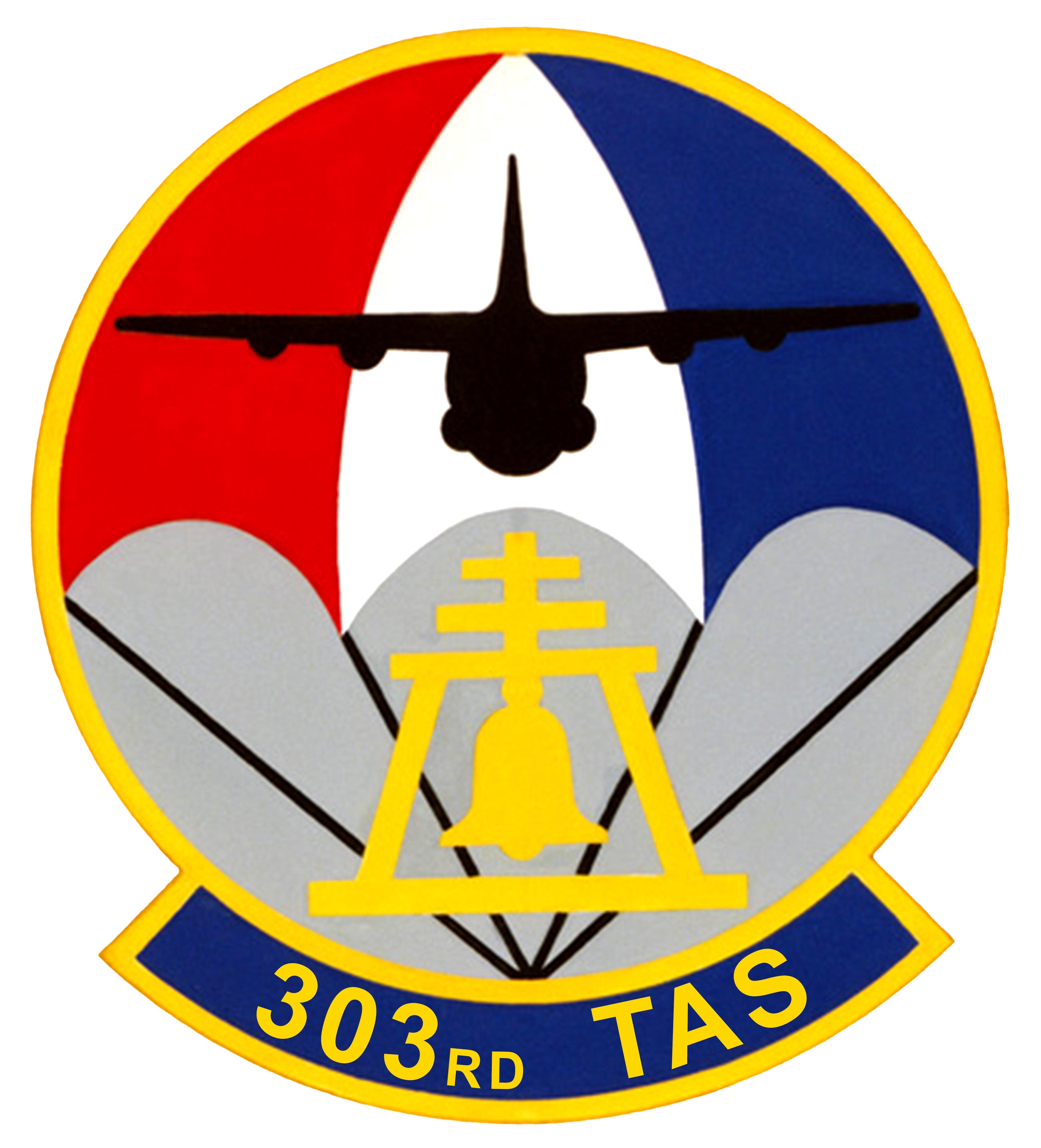
- 303rd Tactical Airlift Squadron emblem (Approved, 1 Apr 1985)

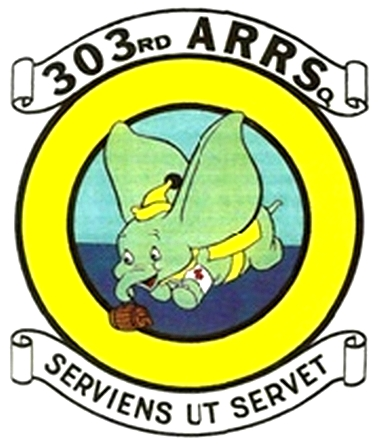
- 303rd Aerospace Rescue and Recovery Squadron emblem (Approved, c. Jan 1966)

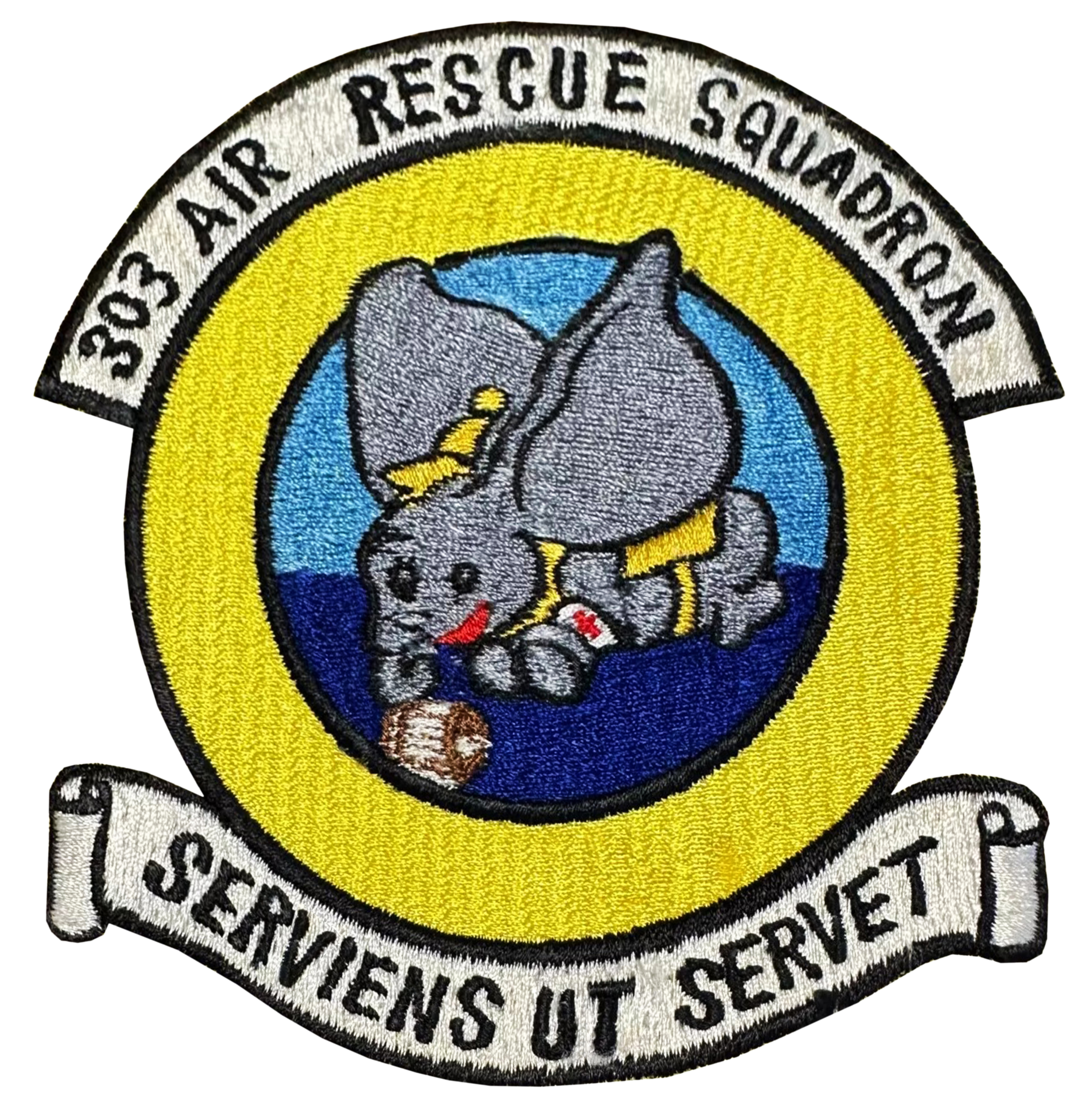
- 303rd Air Rescue Squadron emblem (Approved, 4 Mar 1959)

The 303d Expeditionary Rescue Squadron is a provisional unit of the United States Air Force. It is permanently deployed to Camp Lemonier, Djibouti. It was reactivated in 2013 as a forward deployed umbrella organization for rotational Sikorsky HH-60 Pave Hawk and pararescue/Guardian Angel combat search and rescue units of the Air Force Reserve deployed to U.S. Africa Command, specifically to Combined Joint Task Force-Horn of Africa.

From 1997 until 2003, the 303d Rescue Squadron was a Lockheed HC-130 Combat King squadron, part of the Air Force Reserve Command's 939th Rescue Wing at Portland Air Reserve Station at Portland International Airport, Oregon. When the 939th transitioned to an air refueling mission with the KC-135 Stratotanker and became the 939th Air Refueling Wing, the 303d was inactivated. As part of the 2005 Base Realignment and Closure Commission process, the 939 ARW was itself inactivated in June 2008.

== Mission ==
Combat search and rescue, personnel recovery, and aeromedical evacuation capability for USAFRICOM, AFAFRICA and Combined Joint Task Force-Horn of Africa (CJTF-HOA), to include a rescue alert mission, utilizing the HH-60 Pave Hawk helicopter.

== History ==
=== Reserve Rescue ===
Beginning in 1956, the 303rd Air Rescue Squadron performed Grumman SA-16 Albatross, Boeing HC-97 Stratofreighter and Lockheed HC-130 search and rescue, as well as aeromedical evacuation missions, in the Southwestern United States and occasionally Central America until 1985. During this period the squadron also performed escort missions for aircraft deploying to the Pacific.

=== Tactical Airlift ===
In 1985, the 303rd mission changed to tactical and intratheater airlift with C-130B Hercules airlifting troops, supplies, equipment world-wide, and performing aeromedical evacuations. The 303rd TAS also conducted aerial fire-fighting missions utilizing the Modular Airborne Fire Fighting System in support to the U.S. Forest Service in the Western U.S. from 1985 to 1993.

=== Return to Rescue ===
Reactivated in 1997, the 303d transitioned back to the HC-130P Combat King, relocating to Portland Air National Guard Base and gaining aircraft from the 304th Rescue Squadron. Once again training for combat search and rescue, SAR and helicopter air refueling missions, primarily in the Northwestern United States, augmented by periodic overseas deployments augmenting the regular Air Force. Members of the 303rd RQS were mobilized and deployed to Brindisi Airport, Italy from May - August 1999 in support of Operation Allied Force.

The 303d was inactivated in 2003 when the 939th Rescue Wing changed missions and became the 939th Air Refueling Wing.

=== Expeditionary Search & Rescue ===
The 303d was reactivated in 2013 as an expeditionary rescue squadron (ERQS) for rotational Air Force Reserve Sikorsky HH-60G Pave Hawk and pararescue/Guardian Angel units deployed to Camp Lemonier, Djibouti in support of Combined Joint Task Force-Horn of Africa (CJTF-HOA). In this role, the 303rd ERQS provides HH-60W Jolly Green II casualty evacuation capabilities to partner forces in the fight against violent extremist organizations in the Horn of Africa, able to land directly to the point of injury and provide life-saving treatment after sustaining life-threatening injuries. The squadron replaced Heavy Marine Helicopter Squadron 464 (HMH-464) Detachment A.

== Lineage ==
- Constituted as the 303d Air Rescue Squadron on 1 August 1956

Activated in the reserve on 8 October 1956
Redesignated 303d Aerospace Rescue and Recovery Squadron on 18 January 1966
Redesignated 303d Tactical Airlift Squadron on 1 April 1985
Redesignated 303d Airlift Squadron on 1 February 1992
Inactivated on 30 June 1993

- Redesignated 303d Rescue Squadron on 1 April 1997

Activated in the reserve on 15 April 1997
Inactivated on 1 April 2003

- Redesignated 303d Expeditionary Rescue Squadron and converted to provisional status on 22 July 2011
- Activated c. 5 February 2013

=== Assignments ===
- 2347th Air Reserve Flying Center, 8 October 1956
- 2350th Air Reserve Flying Center, 1 October 1958
- Fourth Air Force, 8 April 1960
- Sixth Air Force Reserve Region, 1 September 1960
- Western Air Force Reserve Region, 31 December 1969
- 403d Aerospace Rescue and Recovery Wing (later 403 Rescue and Weather Reconnaissance Wing), 15 March 1976
- 943d Tactical Airlift Group (later 943d Airlift Group), 1 April 1985
- 943d Operations Group, 1 August 1992 – 30 June 1993
- 939th Operations Group, 15 April 1997 – 1 April 2003
- United States Air Forces in Europe to activate or inactivate at any time on or after 22 July 2011

449th Air Expeditionary Group, c, 5 February 2013

=== Stations ===
- Long Beach Municipal Airport, California, 8 October 1956
- March Air Force Base, California, 1 November 1960 – 30 June 1993
- Portland International Airport (later Portland Air National Guard Base), Oregon, 15 April 1997 – 1 April 2003
- Camp Lemonier, Djibouti, c. 5 February 2013

=== Aircraft ===
- Grumman SA-16 Albatross (later HU-16) (1956–1965)
- Boeing HC-97 Stratofreighter (1965–1972)
- Boeing KC-97 Stratotanker (1965–1966)
- Lockheed HC-130P Combat King (1972–1985, 1997–2003)
- Lockheed C-130B Hercules (1985–1993)
- Sikorsky HH-60 Pave Hawk (2013–)
