= 305th Rescue Squadron =

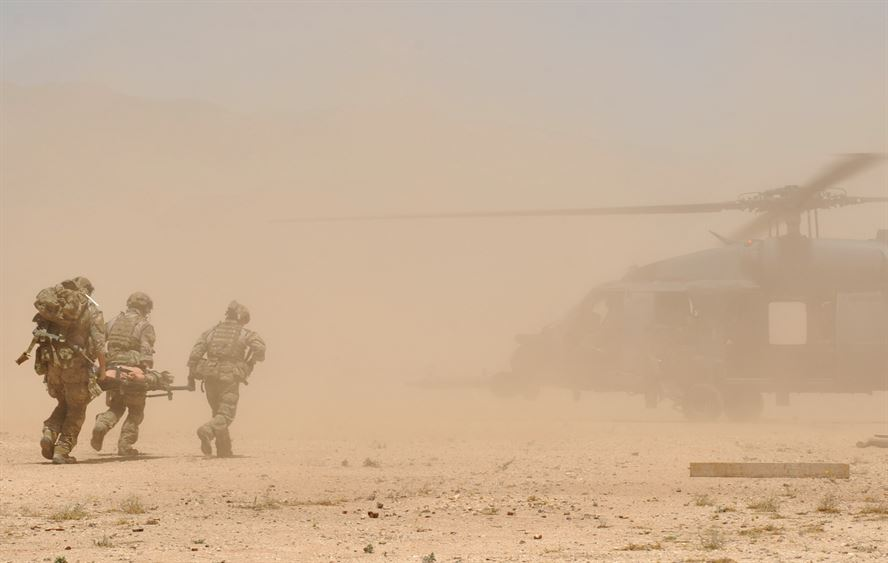
- 306th Rescue Squadron PJs evacuate simulated casualty to 305th Rescue Squadron HH-60 Pave Hawk
- Active: 1958–1992; 1993– present
- Country: United States
- Branch: United States Air Force
- Role: Search and Rescue
- Size: 46 (12 full time, 34 traditional reservists)
- Motto: Anytime Anywhere
- Decorations: Air Force Outstanding Unit Award; Republic of Vietnam Gallantry Cross w/ Palm

Insignia
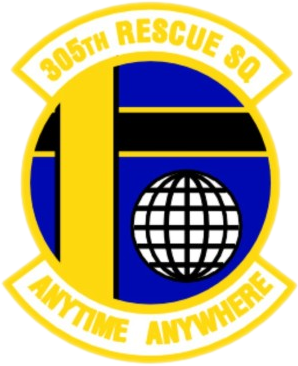
- 305th Rescue Squadron emblem (approved 16 August 1967)

Aircraft flown
- Helicopter: HH-60G Pave Hawk; HH-60W Jolly Green II

The 305th Rescue Squadron is part of the 943rd Rescue Group at Davis–Monthan Air Force Base, Arizona, a subordinate of the 920th Rescue Wing at Patrick Space Force Base, Florida. It operates Sikorsky HH-60W Jolly Green II aircraft conducting peacetime and combat search and rescue missions.

The 305th was originally activated at Selfridge Air Force Base, Michigan in 1958 as the 305th Air Rescue Squadron. It trained for and performed search and rescue operations, primarily in the upper midwestern United States, from 1958 until 1992. It deployed personnel worldwide to support active duty forces and was called to active duty for eighteen months after the USS Pueblo incident in 1968. In 1985, a squadron crew earned the Koran Kolligan, Jr. Trophy, the highest safety award in the Air Force, for successfully landing their severely disabled HH-3 helicopter. The squadron was inactivated in 1992 and its aircraft transferred to the active Air Force or to storage.

The unit was again activated the following year at Davis–Monthan, where it was equipped with HH-60s in 1994. It has participated in most major operations in Southwest Asia since that date. It also flew rescue missions following Hurricane Katrina and is the only United States Air Force rescue unit that is capable of operating from ships.

== Mission ==
The 305th Rescue Squadron is trained and equipped to conduct day or night combat search and rescue missions worldwide with the HH-60G Pavehawk helicopter. Its primary mission is to penetrate enemy territory, recover downed aircrews, and return them to friendly forces. Additionally, the squadron flies search and rescue missions within the United States. It searches for, locates and recovers personnel involved with United States defense activities and provides search and rescue support of civilians as directed by the Air Force Rescue Coordination Center The squadron also provides humanitarian and disaster relief operations at the request of foreign governments and the International Civil Aviation Organization.

If called to active duty, the unit's gaining command is Air Combat Command at Langley Air Force Base, Virginia.

== History ==
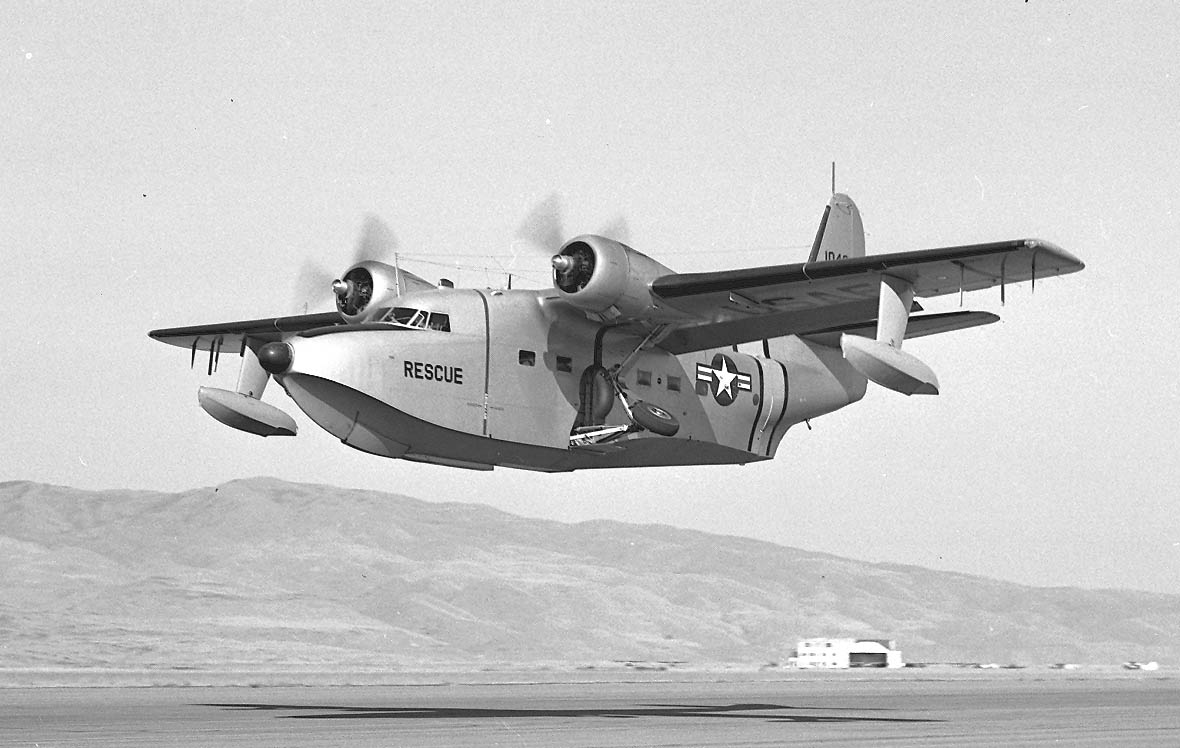
Grumman SA-16A as first flown by the 305th

=== First Activation: 1958–1992 ===
The 305th was first activated as the 305th Air Rescue Squadron at Selfridge Air Force Base, Michigan, in April 1958 and was assigned four Grumman SA-16A Albatross amphibious aircraft and 90 personnel. Its gaining command was the Air Rescue Service of Military Air Transport Service. (Note: In January 1966, Military Air Transport Service Became Military Airlift Command and Air Rescue Service became Aerospace Rescue and Recovery Service. Air Rescue Service returned to its original designation in 1989.) The 305th supported local peacetime rescue operations while maintaining combat deployable status. It also participated in foreign training exercises with Brazil, Honduras and Venezuela. The squadron's peacetime operations included the recovery of eleven seamen from a sinking Canadian freighter in Lake Erie and the transport of fourteen workers critically injured from a factory accident.

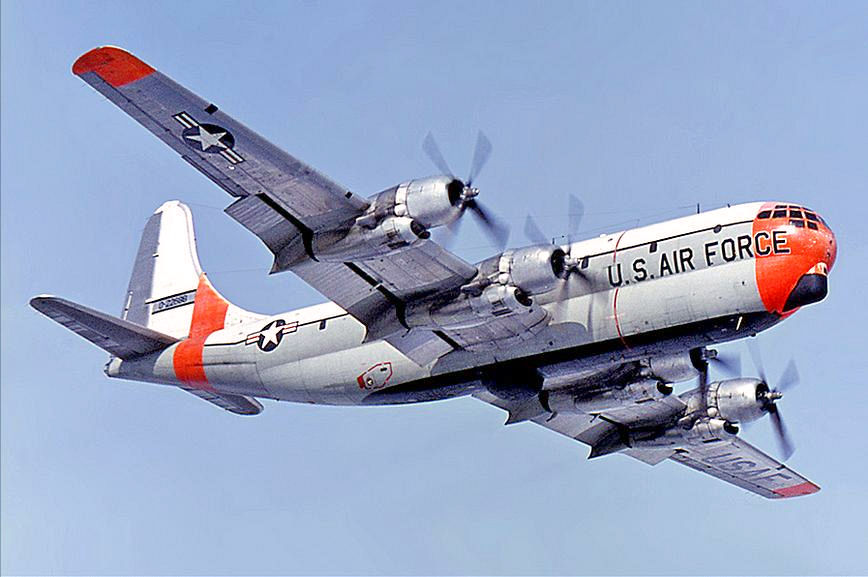
Boeing C-97G Stratofreighter

In late 1965, the unit began to replace its SA-16s with Boeing HC-97 Stratofreighters, and in January 1966 it was redesignated as the 305th Aerospace Rescue and Recovery Squadron. During 1966 and 1967 the unit provided rescue cover for Operation Hi-Cat, which involved research on turbulence at high altitude by Lockheed U-2 aircraft.

The squadron was called to active duty following the USS Pueblo incident in January 1968 and deployed personnel and equipment to the Far East. While on active duty, it earned both an Air Force Outstanding Unit Award and a Republic of Vietnam Gallantry Cross w/ Palm. It was returned to reserve status in June 1969. Other deployments included locations in Libya, Spain, North Africa, Greece, Germany, Italy, England, Iceland, and Southeast Asia.

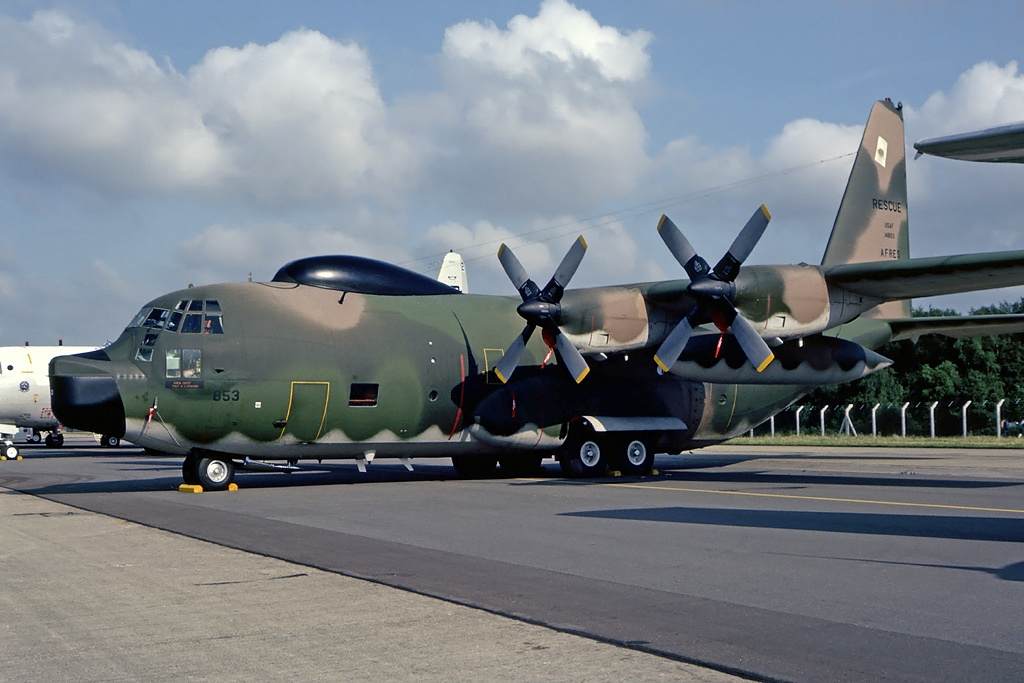
305th Squadron Lockheed HC-130H Hercules

In 1972 the unit upgraded to Lockheed HC-130 Hercules aircraft, which gave the squadron the capability to refuel rescue helicopters. The unit participated in the test and evaluation of the Air Force's C-130 Self-Contained Navigation System and also provided support for Space Shuttle missions. Four years later, the squadron added its first rotary wing aircraft when it was assigned Sikorsky HH-3 Jolly Green Giant helicopters. It continued to operate a combination of HC-130s and CH-3s until 1992. For part of this period, it also flew the CH-3 cargo model of the H-3.

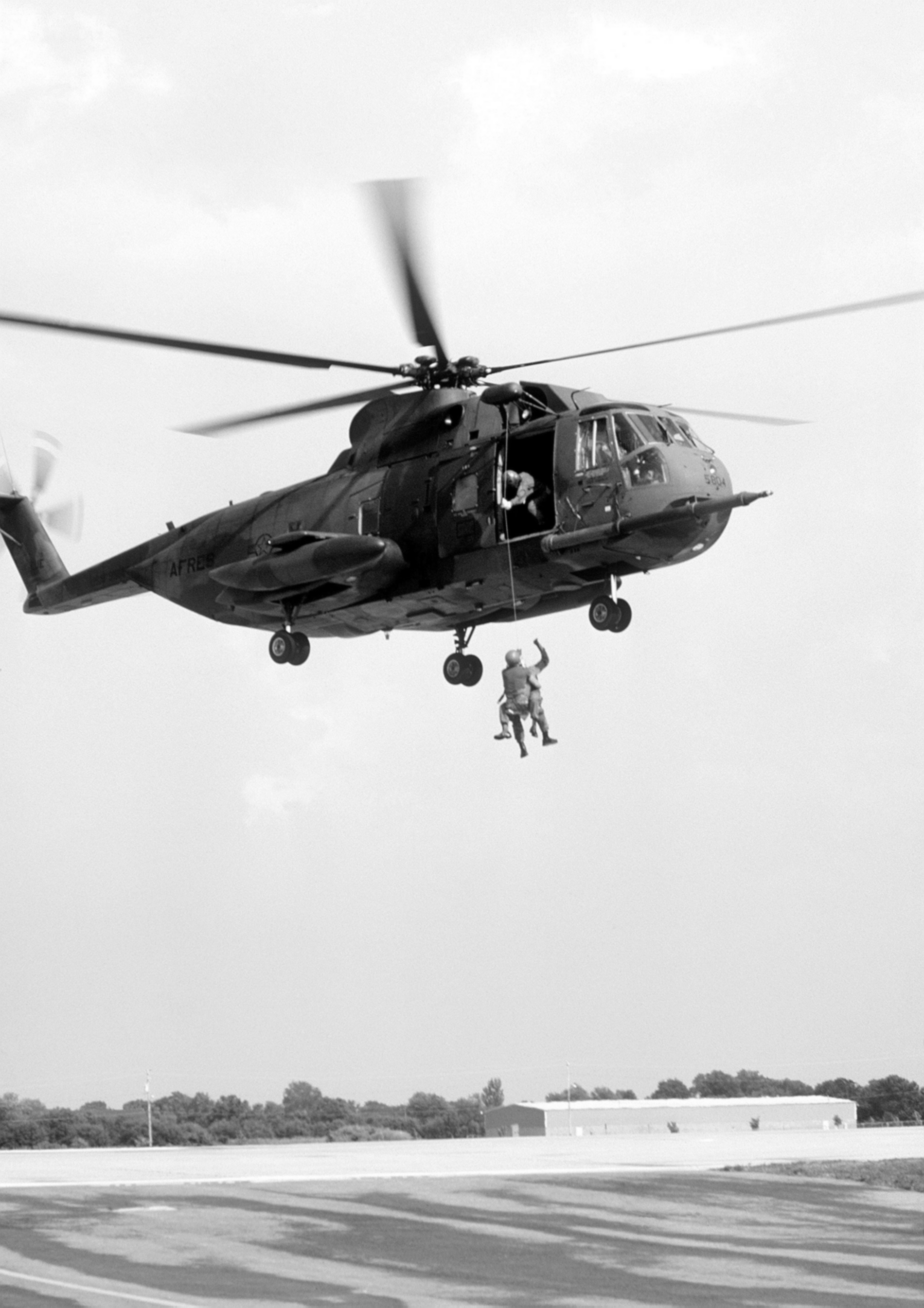
AF Reserve HH-3 hoisting crewmen in 1981

In 1985, Major Larry Brooks and his crew earned the Koran Kolligan, Jr. Trophy, the highest safety award in the Air Force, for successfully landing their severely disabled HH-3 helicopter after one of the engines exploded. During the 1980s, the 305th also provided rescue coverage for tactical fighter and Army units deploying from the United States to Europe.

In 1991, pararescue personnel from the squadron deployed to the Persian Gulf to support the Liberation of Kuwait campaign. The squadron deployed personnel and aircraft to Naval Air Station Keflavík, Iceland, during and after the Gulf War. In 1992, with the drawdown of active and reserve forces, the squadron's HC-130 Hercules aircraft were transferred to active duty units and its HH-3 Jolly Green helicopters were retired. The 305th was inactivated on 30 September 1992.

=== Current era: 1993–present ===
In October 1993 the squadron was again activated on paper at Davis–Monthan Air Force Base, Arizona. On 1 March 1994, the 71st Special Operations Squadron at Davis–Monthan was inactivated and the 305th assumed its mission, personnel and assets when the 71st returned to Davis–Monthan from a six-month tasking for Operation Provide Comfort II. On 19 May 1994, the 305th was credited with its first save since reactivation. One of its crews completed a rescue using night vision goggles and a Stokes litter to hoist an injured Army specialist from a sixty degree mountain slope that was surrounded by forty to sixty foot trees.

Ten months after beginning its conversion to HH-60G Pave Hawk helicopters the squadron was tasked to support Provide Comfort II . The squadron deployed three HH-60G Pave Hawks and 95 personnel and accomplished 315 combat sorties during this deployment. It trained for combat search and rescue and performed search and rescue operations primarily in the Southwestern United States. The 305th also supported counterdrug operations to civilian agencies from 1994.

In 2002, the 305th Rescue Squadron was activated for one year under a partial mobilization order to participate in Operations Enduring Freedom and Southern Watch at Al Jaber Air Base in Kuwait. From April through July 2005 the squadron again deployed for Operation Enduring Freedom. During this time the squadron flew several rescue missions, including the recovery of Marcus Luttrell, the lone surviving SEAL team member engaged in Operation Red Wings in the mountains east of Bagram, Afghanistan. Upon its return to the United States in August, the unit deployed to Louisiana and Texas to assist in the rescue of thousands of people in the aftermath of hurricanes Katrina and Rita.

In 2005, Air Force Reserve Command expanded its rescue organization at Davis Monthan. The 305th was reassigned to the newly activated 943rd Rescue Group and was joined by the 306th Rescue Squadron, which provided a separate unit for pararescue personnel. From January through March 2007 the squadron again deployed for Operation Enduring Freedom. During the deployment, it rescued 14 injured US military personnel from a crashed Boeing CH-47 Chinook helicopter. It deployed again from March to September 2008 and flew over 340 combat sorties and assisted in saving the lives of over 480 people and two military dogs.

The 305th Rescue Squadron is the first and only Air Force Reserve helicopter unit to gain the ability to operate from shipboard.

The first Sikorsky HH-60W Jolly Green II arrived on February 1, 2024.

== Lineage ==
- Constituted as the 305th Air Rescue Squadron on 16 January 1958

Activated in the reserve on 8 February 1958
Redesignated 305th Aerospace Rescue and Recovery Squadron on 18 January 1966

Ordered into active service on 26 January 1968
Released from active service on 19 June 1969

Redesignated 305th Air Rescue Squadron on 1 April 1990
Redesignated 305th Rescue Squadron on 1 February 1992
Inactivated on 1 September 1992

- Activated in the reserve on 1 October 1993

=== Assignments ===
- 2242d Air Reserve Flying Center: 8 February 1958
- Tenth Air Force: 8 April 1958
- 2467th Air Reserve Flying Center: 1 June 1958
- Tenth Air Force: 20 May 1960
- Fifth Air Force Reserve Region: 1 September 1960
- Aerospace Rescue and Recovery Service: 26 January 1968
- Fifth Air Force Reserve Region: 19 June 1969
- Central Air Force Reserve Region: 31 December 1969
- Eastern Air Force Reserve Region: 31 July 1971
- Western Air Force Reserve Region: 1 January 1972
- 403d Aerospace Rescue and Recovery Wing (later 403d Rescue and Weather Reconnaissance Wing): 15 March 1976
- 939th Aerospace Rescue and Recovery Group (later 939th Air Rescue Wing): 1 October 1987
- 939th Operations Group: 1 August 1992 – 1 September 1992
- 939th Operations Group: 1 October 1993
- 943d Rescue Group: 12 February 2005 – present

=== Stations ===
- Selfridge Air Force Base (later Selfridge Air National Guard Base), Michigan, 8 February 1958 – 1 September 1992
- Davis–Monthan Air Force Base, Arizona, 1 October 1993 – present

=== Aircraft ===
- Grumman SA-16A (later HU-16) Albatross (1958–1965)
- Boeing HC-97G Stratofreighter (1965–1972)
- Lockheed HC-130H Hercules (1972–1992)
- Sikorsky CH-3 (1976–1980, 1987–1992)
- Sikorsky HH-3 Jolly Green Giant (1976–1992)
- Sikorsky HH-60G Pave Hawk (1993–2025)
- Sikorsky HH-60W Jolly Green II (2023-)

=== Awards ===
| Award streamer | Award | Dates | Notes |
|---|---|---|---|
| | Air Force Outstanding Unit Award | 26 January 1968 – 26 January 1969 | 305th Aerospace Rescue and Recovery Squadron |
| | Air Force Outstanding Unit Award | 1 July 1977 – 31 December 1978 | 305th Aerospace Rescue and Recovery Squadron |
| | Air Force Outstanding Unit Award | 1 July 1984 – 30 June 1986 | 305th Aerospace Rescue and Recovery Squadron |
| | Air Force Outstanding Unit Award | 1 October 1993 – 31 August 1995 | 305th Rescue Squadron |
| | Air Force Outstanding Unit Award | 1 September 1997 – 31 August 1999 | 305th Rescue Squadron |
| | Vietnamese Gallantry Cross with Palm | 26 January 1968 – 18 June 1969 | 305th Aerospace Rescue and Recovery Squadron |
