= Garður =

- Town
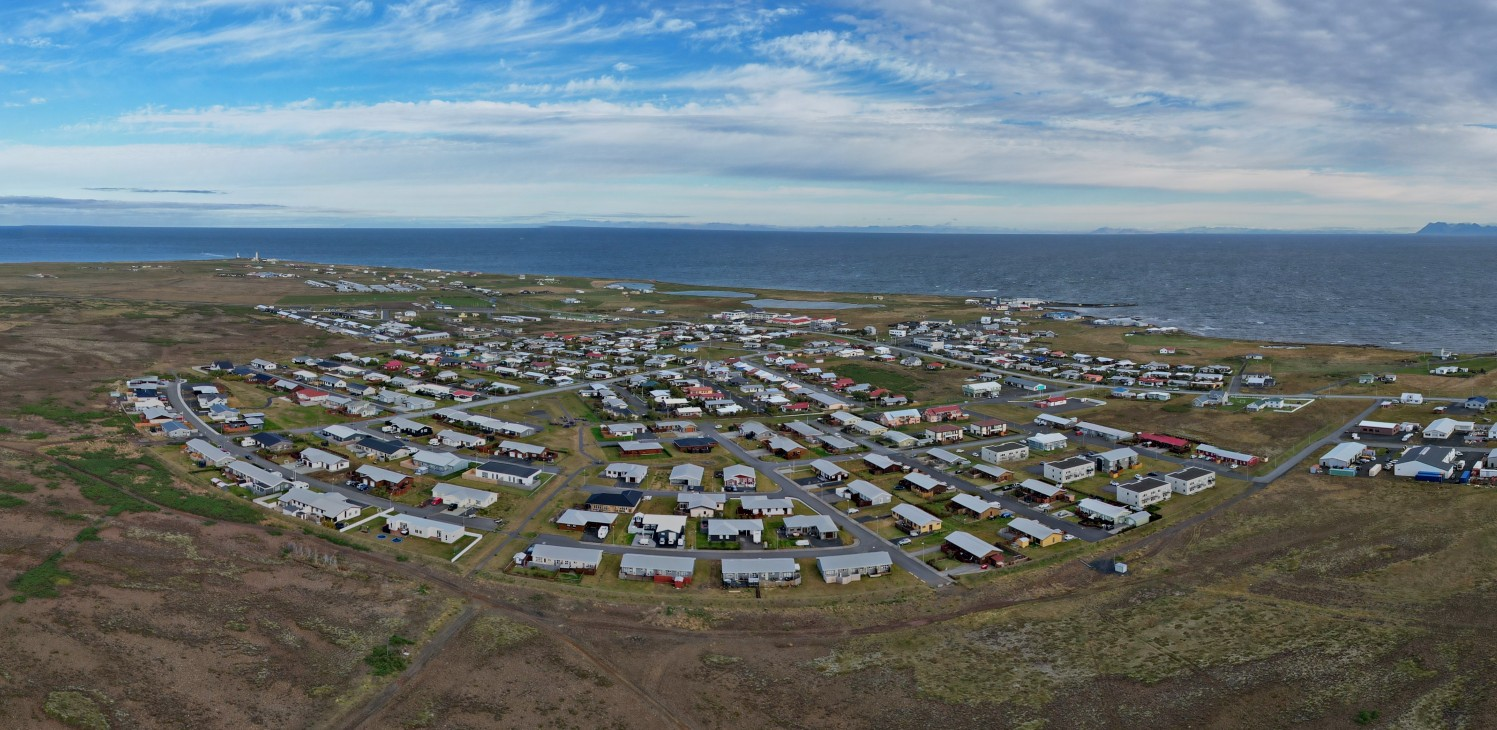
- Aerial view of Garður in 2022

- Location within Iceland
- Coordinates: 64°04′N 22°38′W
- Country: Iceland
- Region: Southern Peninsula
- Constituency: Southwest Constituency
- Municipality: Suðurnesjabær

Government
  - Mayor: Magnús Stefánsson

Population
  - Total: 1,957
- Postal code(s): 250, 251
- Website: svgardur.is

Garður (Icelandic pronunciation: [ˈkarðʏr̥]) is a town in southwestern Iceland on the Southern Peninsula, bordered by the Faxaflói Bay. As of 2026, the town has a population of 1,957. It is part of the municipality of Suðurnesjabær, formed in 2018 when it merged with Sandgerði.

Garður was mentioned in the Book of Settlement when Ingólfur Arnarson, the first settler in Iceland, gave his cousin Steinunn Gamla this area of land.

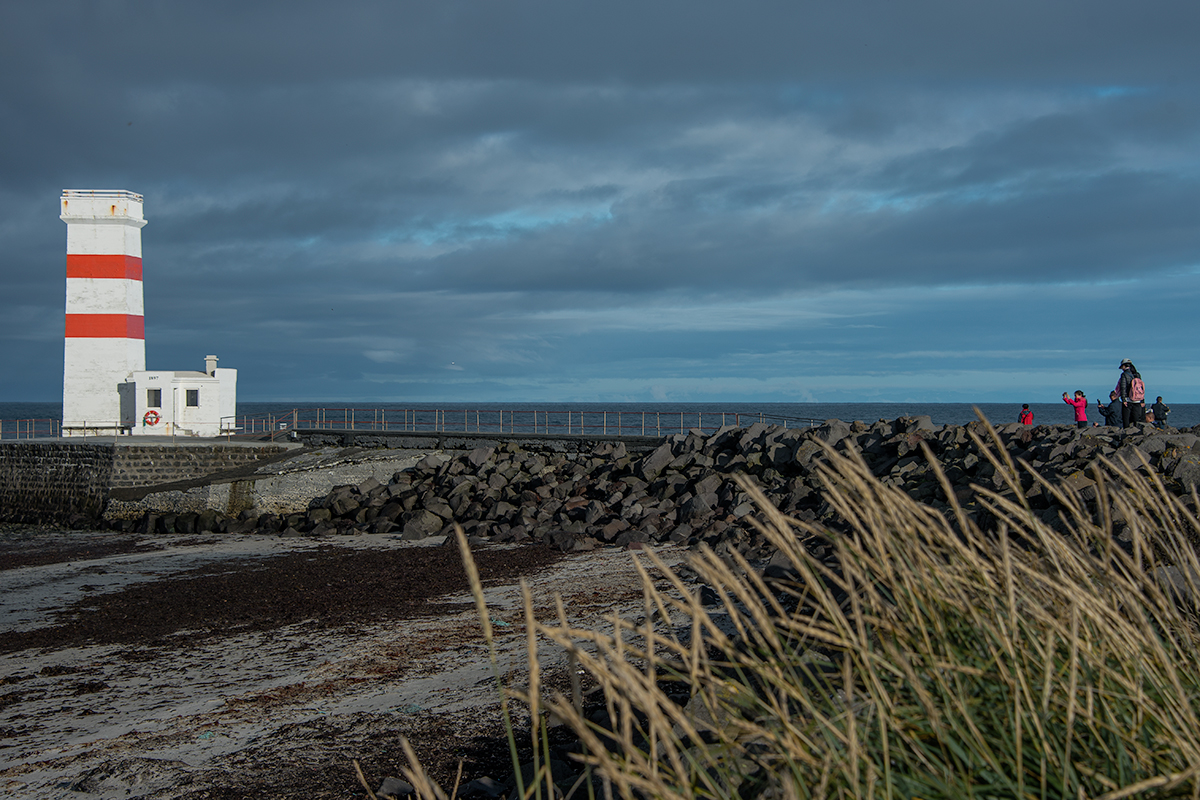
The old lighthouse in Garður at Reykjanes Peninsula Iceland

The Church Útskálar at Garður

The town has two lighthouses. The older of the two was built in 1897, and the younger in 1944. Today there is a restaurant located here, known as The Old Lighthouse Cafe/Rostin Restaurant which serves a small menu of meals. A new one was built in 1944.

The local sports club is called Víðir. Their football team played the 2011 season in the men's third division. They last played in Iceland's top tier in 1991.

Nanna Bryndís Hilmarsdóttir, co-lead singer of the Icelandic band Of Monsters and Men was born in Garður on May 6th 1989. In an interview, she says: "I grew up in Garður and I can definitely say growing up there molded my creativity."
