= Grenivíkurvöllur =

Sports venue in Grenivík, Iceland

(Iceland) Grenivíkurvöllur
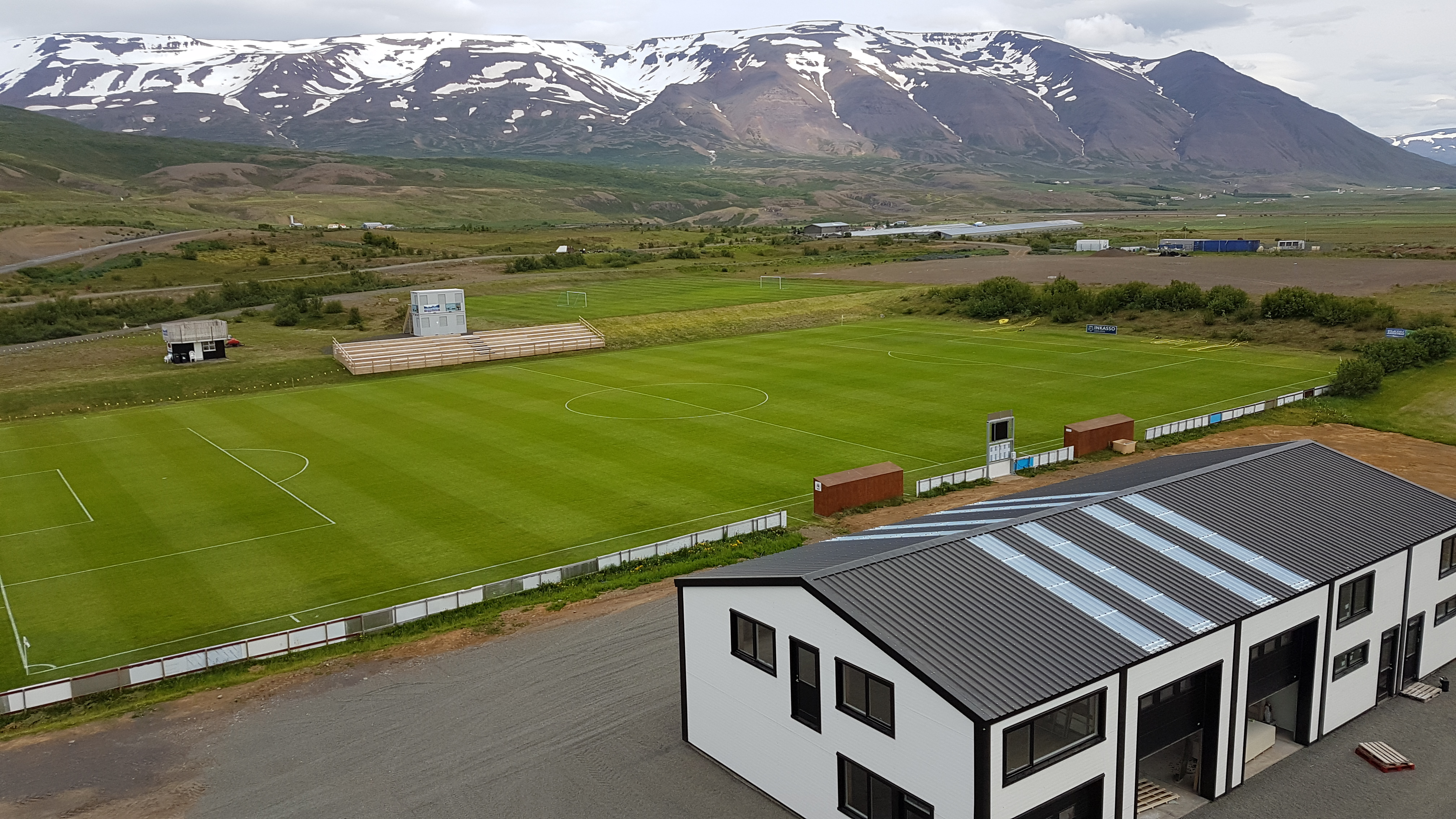
- Interactive map of (Iceland) Grenivíkurvöllur
- Location: Grenivík, Iceland
- Coordinates: 65.948°N 18.170°W
- Capacity: 1100

Tenant
- Magni Grenivík

Grenivíkurvöllur (lit. 'Grenivík Field' or more precisely 'Grenivík Stadium') is a multi-use stadium in Grenivík, Iceland. It is currently used mostly for football matches and is the home stadium of Magni Grenivík. Its capacity is around 1100.
