= List of Iceland international footballers =

The Iceland national football team is the representative association football affiliated to FIFA. The team played its first match on 17 July 1946 against Denmark and played only friendly matches for the first eleven years of its existence before participating in the qualification campaign for the 1958 FIFA World Cup. Iceland have played a total of 402 international fixtures as of 16 October 2012. More than 400 players have represented Iceland in international football; of these, Rúnar Kristinsson has won the most caps with a total of 104 between 1987 and 2004, making him the only Icelander to make more than 100 appearances for the country. Conversely, the Iceland careers of 78 of those players consisted of a single international cap.

Former Chelsea and Barcelona forward Eiður Guðjohnsen is the all-time leading goalscorer for Iceland, with 24 goals in 74 matches. Ríkharður Jónsson scored the second-most goals with 17, while Guðjohnsen's father Arnór is joint-third in the rankings alongside Ríkharður Daðason on 14 goals.

== Key ==
*	Captained the Iceland national team

== List of players ==
As of the match against Peru on 28 March 2018.

Name	Date of birth	Years	Caps	Goals	Ref
Adam Örn Arnarson	27 August 1995	2017	1	0	Profile
Aðalsteinn Aðalsteinsson	25 April 1962	1982–1990	4	0	Profile
Albert Guðmundsson *	5 October 1923	1946–1958	6	2	Profile
Albert Guðmundsson	30 April 1958	1977–1980	7	1	Profile
Albert Guðmundsson	15 June 1997	2017—	4	3	Profile
Alexander Högnason	7 August 1968	1990–1996	3	1	Profile
Alfreð Finnbogason	1 February 1989	2010–	45	11	Profile
Andrés Már Jóhannesson	21 December 1988	2016	1	0	Profile
Andri Marteinsson	8 August 1965	1984–1994	20	1	Profile
Andri Rúnar Bjarnason	12 November 1990	2018–	2	1	Profile
Andri Sigþórsson	25 March 1977	2001–2002	7	2	Profile
Anthony Karl Gregory	6 July 1966	1990–1991	5	2	Profile
Anton Ari Einarsson	25 August 1994	2018–	1	0	Profile
Anton Bjarnason	27 February 1947	1966–1968	5	0	Profile
Anton Sigurðsson	2 October 1919	1946	1	0	Profile
Ari Freyr Skúlason	14 May 1987	2009–	54	0	Profile
Arnar Gunnlaugsson	6 March 1973	1993–2003	32	3	Profile
Arnar Grétarsson	20 February 1972	1991–2004	71	2	Profile
Arnar Viðarsson	15 March 1978	1998–2007	52	2	Profile
Arnljótur Davíðsson	3 September 1968	1988	3	0	Profile
Arnór Guðjohnsen *	30 April 1961	1979–1997	73	14	Profile
Arnór Ingvi Traustason	30 August 1993	2015–	18	5	Profile
Arnór Smárason	7 September 1988	2008–	24	3	Profile
Arnór Sveinn Aðalsteinsson	26 January 1986	2009–2012	12	0	Profile
Aron Elís Þrándarson	10 November 1994	2016–2017	2	0	Profile
Aron Gunnarsson *	22 April 1989	2008–	77	2	Profile
Aron Sigurðarson	8 October 1993	2016–	6	2	Profile
Atli Eðvaldsson *	3 March 1957	1976–1991	70	8	Profile
Atli Einarsson	20 October 1966	1990–1992	4	0	Profile
Atli Guðnason	28 September 1984	2009–2010	3	0	Profile
Atli Helgason	7 March 1967	1991–1992	3	1	Profile
Atli Knútsson	14 March 1975	2002	1	0	Profile
Atli Sveinn Þórarinsson *	24 January 1980	2002–2009	9	0	Profile
Atli Viðar Björnsson	4 January 1980	2009	4	0	Profile
Atli Þór Héðinsson	23 September 1953	1974	2	0	Profile
Auðun Helgason	18 June 1974	1998–2005	35	1	Profile
Axel Axelsson	22 February 1942	1963–1964	3	0	Profile
Ágúst Gylfason	1 August 1971	1993–1996	6	0	Profile
Ágúst Hauksson	11 September 1960	1980	1	0	Profile
Ágúst Már Jónsson	17 August 1960	1986–1989	23	0	Profile
Ármann Smári Björnsson	7 January 1981	2006–2009	6	1	Profile
Árni Gautur Arason *	7 May 1975	1998–2010	71	0	Profile
Árni Njálsson *	16 June 1936	1956–1967	23	0	Profile
Árni Stefánsson	10 October 1953	1975–1978	15	0	Profile
Árni Sveinsson	12 February 1956	1975–1985	50	4	Profile
Árni Vilhjálmsson	9 May 1994	2017	1	0	Profile
Ársæll Kjartansson	6 November 1945	1966–1968	3	0	Profile
Ársæll Kristjánsson	5 October 1958	1984–1985	2	0	Profile
Ásbjörn Björnsson	20 October 1962	1982	1	0	Profile
Ásgeir Elíasson	22 November 1949	1970–1984	32	1	Profile
Ásgeir Gunnar Ásgeirsson	3 June 1980	2007	3	0	Profile
Ásgeir Sigurvinsson *	8 May 1955	1972–1989	45	5	Profile
Ástráður Gunnarsson	30 March 1948	1972–1973	8	0	Profile
Baldur Bragason	29 May 1968	1992–1993	5	0	Profile
Baldur Ingimar Aðalsteinsson	12 February 1980	2002–2008	8	0	Profile
Baldur Sigurðsson	24 April 1985	2009–2010	3	0	Profile
Baldur Þór Bjarnason	3 July 1969	1991–1993	11	0	Profile
Baldvin Baldvinsson	29 June 1943	1965–1971	4	1	Profile
Bergur Bergsson	22 May 1928	1951	2	0	Profile
Birgir Sigurðsson	26 October 1920	1947	1	0	Profile
Birkir Bjarnason	27 May 1988	2010–	65	9	Profile
Birkir Kristinsson *	15 August 1964	1988–2004	74	0	Profile
Birkir Már Sævarsson	11 November 1984	2007–	78	1	Profile
Bjarki Gunnlaugsson	6 March 1973	1993–2000	27	7	Profile
Bjarni Felixson	27 December 1936	1962–1964	6	0	Profile
Bjarni Guðjónsson *	26 February 1979	1997–2010	23	1	Profile
Bjarni Guðnason	3 September 1928	1951–1953	4	0	Profile
Bjarni Jónsson	31 May 1965	1990	2	0	Profile
Bjarni Ólafur Eiríksson	28 March 1982	2005–2012	21	0	Profile
Bjarni Óskar Þorsteinsson	31 August 1976	2000–2003	10	0	Profile
Bjarni Sigurðsson	16 October 1960	1980–1991	41	0	Profile
Bjarni Sveinbjörnsson	18 February 1963	1985	1	0	Profile
Bjarni Viðarsson	5 March 1988	2008	1	0	Profile
Björgólfur Hideaki Takefusa	11 May 1980	2003–2009	3	0	Profile
Björgvin Hermannsson	27 June 1938	1957	1	0	Profile
Björn Bergmann Sigurðarson	26 February 1991	2011—	11	1	Profile
Björn Daníel Sverrisson	29 May 1990	2014–2017	8	0	Profile
Björn Helgason	24 September 1935	1959–1963	2	0	Profile
Björn Lárusson	2 February 1945	1967–1975	10	1	Profile
Brandur Brynjólfsson *	21 December 1916	1946	1	0	Profile
Brynjar Gunnarsson *	16 October 1975	1997–2009	74	4	Profile
Böðvar Böðvarsson	9 April 1995	2017—	4	0	Profile
Daði Lárusson	19 June 1973	2005–2007	3	0	Profile
Dagbjartur Grímsson	30 January 1932	1957	2	0	Profile
Dagbjartur Hannesson	20 March 1930	1953–1954	3	0	Profile
Davíð Viðarsson *	24 April 1984	2007–2017	9	0	Profile
Diego Johannesson	3 October 1993	2016-	3	0	Profile
Diðrik Ólafsson	16 December 1951	1973	3	0	Profile
Dýri Guðmundsson	14 September 1951	1978–1980	5	0	Profile
Eggert Guðmundsson	6 April 1964	1985	1	0	Profile
Eggert Jónsson	18 August 1988	2007–2012	19	0	Profile
Eiður Guðjohnsen*	15 September 1978	1996–2016	88	26	Profile
Einar Ásbjörn Ólafsson	7 June 1959	1984–1985	3	0	Profile
Einar Daníelsson	19 January 1970	1993–2002	21	1	Profile
Einar Guðleifsson	20 July 1947	1966	1	0	Profile
Einar Gunnarsson *	22 September 1949	1969–1973	20	0	Profile
Einar Halldórsson	2 June 1923	1948–1956	9	0	Profile
Einar Páll Tómasson	18 October 1968	1990–1992	5	0	Profile
Einar Þórhallsson	1 July 1952	1976	1	0	Profile
Eiríkur Þorsteinsson	27 April 1950	1974	3	0	Profile
Elfar Freyr Helgason	27 July 1989	2011	1	0	Profile
Elías Már Ómarsson	18 January 1995	2015–2017	9	0	Profile
Ellert Schram *	10 October 1939	1959–1970	23	6	Profile
Ellert Sölvason	17 December 1917	1946–1949	4	0	Profile
Elmar Geirsson	25 July 1948	1967–1980	23	2	Profile
Emil Hallfreðsson	29 June 1984	2004–	62	1	Profile
Emil Pálsson	10 June 1993	2016	1	0	Profile
Erlendur Magnússon	27 January 1946	1970–1971	2	0	Profile
Erlingur Kristjánsson	7 May 1962	1982–1984	5	3	Profile
Eyjólfur Héðinsson	1 January 1985	2008–2012	5	0	Profile
Eyjólfur Sverrisson *	3 August 1968	1990–2001	66	10	Profile
Eyleifur Hafsteinsson *	31 May 1947	1964–1972	26	4	Profile
Felix Örn Friðriksson	16 March 1999	2018—	2	0	Profile
Finnur Kolbeinsson	21 March 1972	1993	1	0	Profile
Fjalar Þorgeirsson	18 January 1977	2001–2008	4	0	Profile
Frederik Schram	19 January 1995	2017–	3	0	Profile
Friðrik Friðriksson	6 October 1964	1982–1995	26	0	Profile
Garðar Árnason	6 January 1938	1959–1963	11	1	Profile
Garðar Gunnlaugsson	25 April 1983	2016	1	0	Profile
Garðar Jóhannsson	1 April 1980	2008–2012	8	2	Profile
Gísli Torfason *	10 July 1954	1973–1979	29	0	Profile
Gísli Þorkelsson	25 September 1941	1964	1	0	Profile
Grétar Einarsson	11 October 1964	1991–1992	3	0	Profile
Grétar Hjartarson	26 November 1977	2002	1	0	Profile
Grétar Magnússon	7 October 1945	1973–1975	8	0	Profile
Grétar Steinsson *	9 January 1982	2002–2012	46	4	Profile
Guðbjörn Jónsson	19 March 1921	1953	1	0	Profile
Guðgeir Leifsson	25 September 1951	1971–1979	39	1	Profile
Guðjón Árni Antoníusson	3 September 1983	2009	1	0	Profile
Guðjón Baldvinsson	15 February 1986	2009–2014	4	0	Profile
Guðjón Finnbogason	2 December 1927	1953–1958	16	0	Profile
Guðjón Guðmundsson	24 August 1945	1969–1970	4	0	Profile
Guðjón Jónsson	13 February 1939	1960	2	0	Profile
Guðjón Þórðarson	14 September 1955	1985	1	0	Profile
Guðmann Þórisson	30 January 1987	2008	1	0	Profile
Guðmundur Baldursson	7 November 1959	1981–1988	9	0	Profile
Guðmundur Benediktsson	3 September 1974	1994–2001	10	2	Profile
Guðmundur Erlingsson	22 November 1963	1984	1	0	Profile
Guðmundur Hreiðarsson	5 October 1960	1988–1989	2	0	Profile
Guðmundur Ingi Magnússon	1 October 1963	1991	1	0	Profile
Guðmundur Kristjánsson	1 March 1989	2009–2014	6	0	Profile
Guðmundur Óskarsson	6 August 1936	1960	1	0	Profile
Guðmundur Pétursson	6 May 1946	1967	3	0	Profile
Guðmundur Reynir Gunnarsson	21 January 1989	2008–2010	3	0	Profile
Guðmundur Steinarsson	20 October 1979	2002–2008	3	0	Profile
Guðmundur Steinsson *	18 July 1960	1980–1988	19	8	Profile
Guðmundur Torfason	13 December 1961	1985–1991	26	4	Profile
Guðmundur Þorbjörnsson *	19 April 1957	1976–1986	37	7	Profile
Guðmundur Þórarinsson	15 April 1992	2014–2016	3	0	Profile
Guðmundur Þórðarson	2 August 1945	1970	3	0	Profile
Guðni Bergsson *	21 July 1965	1984–2003	80	1	Profile
Guðni Jónsson	17 February 1943	1964–1967	3	0	Profile
Guðni Kjartansson *	10 December 1946	1967–1973	31	0	Profile
Gunnar Einarsson	7 July 1976	1998	1	0	Profile
Gunnar Felixson	14 March 1940	1961–1966	7	2	Profile
Gunnar Gíslason	4 January 1961	1982–1991	50	3	Profile
Gunnar Guðmannsson	6 June 1930	1951–1964	9	2	Profile
Gunnar Gunnarsson	14 June 1933	1953–1957	7	1	Profile
Gunnar Heiðar Þorvaldsson	1 April 1982	2005–2013	24	5	Profile
Gunnar Leósson	12 February 1936	1957	1	0	Profile
Gunnar Már Másson	15 March 1971	1997	2	0	Profile
Gunnar Oddsson	27 March 1965	1989–1995	3	1	Profile
Gunnar Þór Gunnarsson	4 October 1985	2007	3	0	Profile
Gunnlaugur Jónsson	29 November 1974	1997–2002	12	0	Profile
Gunnlaugur Lárusson	10 April 1923	1947–1948	2	0	Profile
Gunnleifur Gunnleifsson	14 July 1975	2000–2014	26	0	Profile
Gylfi Einarsson	27 October 1978	2000–2006	24	1	Profile
Gylfi Sigurðsson	8 September 1989	2010–	55	18	Profile
Hafsteinn Guðmundsson	1 October 1923	1946–1951	4	0	Profile
Hafþór Kolbeinsson	18 June 1964	1984	2	0	Profile
Hafþór Sveinjónsson	14 November 1961	1982–1983	3	0	Profile
Halldór Áskelsson	20 April 1965	1984–1989	24	4	Profile
Halldór Björnsson	11 February 1948	1968–1976	9	0	Profile
Halldór Halldórsson	13 April 1931	1949–1957	11	1	Profile
Halldór Halldórsson	23 April 1961	1985	1	0	Profile
Halldór Orri Björnsson	2 March 1987	2012–2014	2	0	Profile
Halldór Sigurbjörnsson	3 October 1933	1954–1957	8	0	Profile
Hallgrímur Jónasson	4 May 1986	2008–2017	16	3	Profile
Hannes Sigurðsson	10 April 1983	2005–2008	13	1	Profile
Hannes Þór Halldórsson	27 April 1984	2011–	48	0	Profile
Haraldur Björnsson	11 January 1989	2016	1	0	Profile
Haraldur Freyr Guðmundsson	14 December 1981	2005	2	0	Profile
Haraldur Ingólfsson	1 August 1970	1990–1996	20	2	Profile
Haraldur Sturlaugsson	24 July 1949	1969–1971	7	0	Profile
Haukur Bjarnason	23 September 1928	1951–1956	5	0	Profile
Haukur Heiðar Hauksson	1 September 1991	2015–2016	7	0	Profile
Haukur Ingi Guðnason	8 September 1978	1998–2002	8	0	Profile
Haukur Óskarsson	5 January 1915	1946–1947	2	0	Profile
Haukur Páll Sigurðsson	5 August 1987	2012–2014	2	0	Profile
Heiðar Helguson *	22 August 1977	1999-2011	55	12	Profile
Heimir Einarsson	20 April 1987	2008	1	0	Profile
Heimir Guðjónsson	13 June 1937	1959–1965	7	0	Profile
Heimir Guðjónsson	3 April 1969	1996–1997	6	0	Profile
Heimir Guðmundsson	29 July 1964	1987–1988	3	0	Profile
Heimir Karlsson	18 March 1961	1982	3	1	Profile
Helgi Bentsson	2 January 1962	1983	2	0	Profile
Helgi Björgvinsson	23 August 1934	1956–1958	2	1	Profile
Helgi Daníelsson	16 April 1933	1953–1965	25	0	Profile
Helgi Daníelsson	13 July 1981	2001–2014	33	0	Profile
Helgi Eysteinsson	30 May 1925	1949	1	0	Profile
Helgi Jónsson *	30 May 1936	1960–1961	3	0	Profile
Helgi Kolviðsson	13 September 1971	1996–2003	30	0	Profile
Helgi Númason	17 September 1946	1967	2	1	Profile
Helgi Sigurðsson	17 September 1974	1993–2008	62	10	Profile
Hermann Gunnarsson	9 December 1946	1966–1973	20	6	Profile
Hermann Hermannsson	7 October 1914	1946–1949	4	0	Profile
Hermann Hreiðarsson *	11 July 1974	1996–2011	89	5	Profile
Hilmar Árni Halldórsson	14 February 1992	2018–	2	0	Profile
Hilmar Björnsson	13 May 1969	1994–1997	3	0	Profile
Hinrik Þórhallsson	18 February 1954	1976–1980	2	0	Profile
Hjálmar Jónsson	29 July 1980	2002–2013	21	0	Profile
Hjörtur Hermannsson	8 February 1995	2016—	7	1	Profile
Hjörtur Logi Valgarðsson	27 September 1988	2008–2016	10	0	Profile
Hlynur Birgisson	22 January 1968	1987–1997	12	1	Profile
Hlynur Stefánsson	8 October 1964	1991–1996	25	1	Profile
Hólmar Örn Eyjólfsson	6 August 1990	2012–	9	0	Profile
Hólmbert Friðjónsson	19 April 1993	2015	2	1	Profile
Hreiðar Ársælsson	20 November 1929	1955–1964	8	0	Profile
Hreiðar Bjarnason	29 May 1973	2000–2001	3	0	Profile
Hreinn Elliðason	25 December 1946	1969	3	0	Profile
Högni Gunnlaugsson	9 June 1936	1964-1967	4	0	Profile
Hörður Árnason	19 May 1989	2015	1	0	Profile
Hörður Felixson	25 October 1931	1958–1963	11	0	Profile
Hörður Hilmarsson	21 November 1952	1974–1979	14	1	Profile
Hörður Kári Jóhannesson	8 November 1954	1985	1	0	Profile
Hörður Björgvin Magnússon	11 February 1993	2014–	15	2	Profile
Hörður Magnússon	19 February 1966	1990–1993	9	1	Profile
Hörður Óskarsson	26 March 1923	1949	1	0	Profile
Indriði Sigurðsson	12 October 1981	2000–2014	65	2	Profile
Ingi Björn Albertsson	3 November 1952	1971–1979	15	2	Profile
Ingvar Elísson	6 January 1941	1960–1967	4	0	Profile
Ingvar Guðmundsson	24 January 1965	1987–1990	10	0	Profile
Ingvar Jónsson	18 October 1989	2014–	7	0	Profile
Izudin Dervic	22 February 1963	1993–1995	14	0	Profile
Ívar Bjarklind	17 December 1974	1997	1	0	Profile
Ívar Ingimarsson	20 August 1977	1998–2007	30	0	Profile
Jakob Jakobsson	20 April 1937	1961	1	0	Profile
Jakob Jónharðsson	24 April 1971	1997	1	0	Profile
Janus Guðlaugsson *	7 October 1955	1977–1985	34	2	Profile
Joey Guðjónsson	25 May 1980	2001–2007	34	1	Profile
Jóhann Berg Guðmundsson	27 October 1990	2008–	65	7	Profile
Jóhann Birnir Guðmundsson	5 December 1977	1997–2004	8	0	Profile
Jóhann Hreiðarsson	4 July 1954	1980	1	0	Profile
Jóhann Laxdal	27 January 1990	2013	1	0	Profile
Jóhannes Atlason *	7 September 1944	1967–1972	24	0	Profile
Jóhannes Eðvaldsson *	3 September 1950	1971–1983	34	2	Profile
Jóhannes Harðarson	28 July 1976	2005	2	0	Profile
Jón Alfreðsson	13 November 1949	1971–1975	4	0	Profile
Jón Daði Böðvarsson	25 May 1992	2012–	36	2	Profile
Jón Einarsson	9 March 1959	1982	1	0	Profile
Jón Guðni Fjóluson	10 April 1989	2010–	13	1	Profile
Jón Gunnar Bergs	6 June 1962	1982	1	0	Profile
Jón Gunnlaugsson	19 December 1949	1974–1977	5	0	Profile
Jón Jóhannsson	18 January 1944	1966–1967	2	1	Profile
Jón Leósson	23 February 1935	1957–1964	7	0	Profile
Jón Oddsson	25 January 1958	1979	1	0	Profile
Jón Ólafur Jónsson	5 December 1940	1969	2	0	Profile
Jón Örn Jónasson	25 February 1923	1946	1	0	Profile
Jón Pétursson *	4 November 1950	1974–1980	26	0	Profile
Jón Stefánsson	14 April 1937	1961–1967	11	0	Profile
Jónas Guðni Sævarsson	28 November 1983	2008–2009	7	2	Profile
Július Marteinsson	17 June 1960	1980	1	0	Profile
Karl Guðmundsson *	28 January 1924	1946–1954	10	0	Profile
Karl Hermannsson	8 March 1945	1964–1975	10	0	Profile
Karl Þórðarson	31 May 1955	1975–1984	16	0	Profile
Kári Árnason	25 February 1944	1961–1971	11	1	Profile
Kári Árnason	13 October 1982	2005–	65	4	Profile
Kjartan Antonsson	30 September 1976	2001	1	0	Profile
Kjartan Einarsson	15 June 1968	1990–1991	3	1	Profile
Kjartan Finnbogason	9 July 1986	2011—	11	2	Profile
Kjartan Sigtryggsson	8 April 1944	1967	1	0	Profile
Kjartan Sturluson	27 December 1975	2002–2008	7	0	Profile
Kolbeinn Sigþórsson*	14 March 1990	2010–	44	22	Profile
Kristinn Björnsson	13 September 1955	1974–1977	2	1	Profile
Kristinn Freyr Sigurðsson	25 December 1991	2017	1	0	Profile
Kristinn Gunnlaugsson	12 July 1934	1955–1960	9	0	Profile
Kristinn Hafliðason	3 June 1975	1994	1	0	Profile
Kristinn Jónsson	4 August 1990	2009–2017	8	0	Profile
Kristinn Jörundsson	13 October 1950	1972–1980	2	0	Profile
Kristinn Rúnar Jónsson	23 June 1964	1988–1992	11	0	Profile
Kristinn Steindórsson	29 April 1990	2015–2017	3	2	Profile
Kristján Finnbogason *	8 May 1971	1993–2005	20	0	Profile
Kristján Flóki Finnbogason	12 January 1995	2017–	4	1	Profile
Kristján Halldórsson	9 December 1969	1991	1	0	Profile
Kristján Jónsson	29 October 1963	1984–1995	42	0	Profile
Kristján Olgeirsson	1 July 1960	1980	1	0	Profile
Kristján Örn Sigurðsson *	7 October 1980	2003–2012	53	4	Profile
Kristófer Sigurgeirsson	19 January 1972	1994	2	0	Profile
Lárus Guðmundsson	12 December 1961	1980–1987	17	3	Profile
Lárus Sigurðsson	4 June 1973	1995–2003	42	2	Profile
Loftur Ólafsson	4 July 1963	1986–1987	8	1	Profile
Magnús Bergs	27 August 1956	1980–1985	16	2	Profile
Magnús Jónatansson	4 March 1943	1965–1970	5	0	Profile
Magnús Jónsson	10 September 1931	1954	2	0	Profile
Magnús Torfason	25 February 1945	1966–1967	4	2	Profile
Magnús Þorvaldsson	4 January 1950	1974	2	0	Profile
Marel Baldvinsson	18 December 1980	2001–2008	17	0	Profile
Mark Duffield	28 November 1963	1984	1	0	Profile
Marteinn Geirsson *	11 February 1951	1971–1982	67	8	Profile
Matthías Guðmundsson	1 August 1980	2006–2009	4	0	Profile
Matthías Hallgrímsson	12 December 1946	1968–1977	45	11	Profile
Matthías Vilhjálmsson	30 January 1987	2009–2016	15	2	Profile
Mikael Anderson	1 July 1998	2018–	1	0	Profile
Njáll Eiðsson	7 June 1958	1982–1987	7	0	Profile
Oliver Sigurjónsson	3 March 1995	2015—2017	2	0	Profile
Ormarr Örlygsson	24 November 1962	1986–1992	9	0	Profile
Orri Sigurður Ómarsson	18 February 1995	2017–	3	0	Profile
Ottó Guðmundsson	15 April 1955	1979–1980	3	0	Profile
Ottó Jónsson	1 January 1921	1946	1	0	Profile
Ólafur Adolfsson	18 October 1967	1994–1997	21	1	Profile
Ólafur Björnsson	7 October 1958	1981–1984	7	0	Profile
Ólafur Danívalsson	9 July 1953	1976–1977	2	1	Profile
Ólafur Gíslason	16 November 1936	1956–1957	2	0	Profile
Ólafur Gottskálksson	12 March 1968	1991–1997	9	0	Profile
Ólafur Kristjánsson	20 May 1968	1990–1996	14	0	Profile
Ólafur Hannesson	7 November 1926	1948–1955	5	0	Profile
Ólafur Ingi Skúlason	1 April 1983	2003–	35	1	Profile
Ólafur Júlíusson	11 July 1951	1972–1980	17	1	Profile
Ólafur Karl Finsen	30 March 1992	2015	2	0	Profile
Ólafur Örn Bjarnason	15 May 1975	1998–2007	27	0	Profile
Ólafur Sigurvinsson	8 April 1951	1970–1977	30	0	Profile
Ólafur Stígsson	16 December 1975	2001–2003	9	0	Profile
Ólafur Þór Gunnarsson	25 October 1977	2002	1	0	Profile
Ólafur Þórðarson *	22 August 1965	1984–1996	72	5	Profile
Óli B. Jónsson	15 November 1918	1949	1	0	Profile
Óli Þór Magnússon	4 May 1963	1983	2	2	Profile
Ómar Rafnsson	23 June 1962	1982–1983	4	0	Profile
Ómar Torfason *	1 February 1959	1981–1989	39	1	Profile
Óskar Færseth	11 November 1958	1980	2	0	Profile
Óskar Hrafn Þorvaldsson	25 October 1973	1997	3	0	Profile
Óskar Örn Hauksson	22 August 1984	2009–2010	2	0	Profile
Óskar Pétur Tómasson	29 January 1956	1974–1976	4	0	Profile
Óskar Sigurbergsson	25 October 1927	1954	1	0	Profile
Óskar Sigurðsson	22 July 1939	1966	1	0	Profile
Óskar Valtýsson	7 March 1951	1971	2	0	Profile
Óttar Magnús Karlsson	21 February 1997	2017—	5	1	Profile
Páll Ólafsson	1 May 1960	1980	2	1	Profile
Páll Pálmason	11 August 1945	1969	1	0	Profile
Pálmi Rafn Pálmason	9 November 1984	2008–2010	18	0	Profile
Pétur Arnþórsson	8 May 1965	1984–1990	28	0	Profile
Pétur Georgsson	5 June 1931	1953–1954	5	0	Profile
Pétur Marteinsson	14 July 1973	1993–2005	36	1	Profile
Pétur Ormslev *	28 July 1958	1979–1991	41	5	Profile
Pétur Pétursson *	27 June 1959	1978–1990	41	11	Profile
Ragnar Margeirsson	14 August 1962	1981–1992	46	5	Profile
Ragnar Sigtryggsson	26 May 1925	1957	1	0	Profile
Ragnar Sigurðsson	19 June 1986	2007–	75	3	Profile
Reynir Jónsson	15 April 1943	1966–1969	6	0	Profile
Reynir Karlsson	27 February 1934	1956–1957	3	0	Profile
Reynir Þórðarson	13 March 1930	1953	3	1	Profile
Ríkharður Daðason	26 April 1972	1991–2003	44	14	Profile
Ríkharður Jónsson *	12 November 1929	1947–1965	33	17	Profile
Róbert Agnarsson	21 October 1957	1978	1	0	Profile
Rúnar Alex Rúnarsson	18 February 1995	2017–	3	0	Profile
Rúnar Guðmannsson	14 July 1939	1958–1961	6	0	Profile
Rúnar Kristinsson *	5 September 1969	1987–2004	104	3	Profile
Rúnar Már Sigurjónsson	18 June 1990	2012–	15	1	Profile
Rúnar Svanholt Gíslason	10 July 1952	1976	1	0	Profile
Rúrik Gíslason	25 February 1988	2009–	45	3	Profile
Rútur Snorrason	28 March 1974	1995–1996	3	0	Profile
Samúel Friðjónsson	22 February 1996	2018—	3	0	Profile
Sigurbergur Sigsteinsson	10 February 1948	1971	1	0	Profile
Sigurður Albertsson	30 November 1934	1966–1969	7	0	Profile
Sigurður Björgvinsson	22 March 1959	1978–1985	3	0	Profile
Sigurður Dagsson *	27 September 1944	1966–1977	18	0	Profile
Sigurður Egill Lárusson	22 January 1992	2017	2	0	Profile
Sigurður Einarsson	7 April 1943	1964	1	0	Profile
Sigurður Grétarsson *	2 May 1962	1980–1992	46	8	Profile
Sigurður Halldórsson *	24 April 1957	1980–1984	13	0	Profile
Sigurður Jónsson *	27 September 1966	1983–1999	65	3	Profile
Sigurður Lárusson	26 June 1954	1981–1984	11	0	Profile
Sigurður Ólafsson *	7 December 1916	1946–1949	4	0	Profile
Sigurður Örn Jónsson	30 July 1973	1997–2000	7	0	Profile
Sigurjón Kristjánsson	5 April 1962	1982	3	0	Profile
Sigurlás Þorleifsson	15 July 1957	1979–1982	10	2	Profile
Siguróli Kristjánsson	11 September 1966	1987	2	0	Profile
Sigursteinn Gíslason	25 June 1968	1993–1999	22	0	Profile
Sigurvin Ólafsson	29 May 1942	1965	1	0	Profile
Sigurvin Ólafsson	18 July 1976	1997–2006	7	0	Profile
Sigurþór Jakobsson	16 August 1942	1962–1965	6	0	Profile
Sigþór Júlíusson	27 April 1975	2000–2001	2	0	Profile
Símon Kristjánsson	1 December 1952	1980	1	0	Profile
Skúli Ágústsson	23 February 1943	1962–1970	3	0	Profile
Skúli Jón Friðgeirsson	30 July 1988	2010–2012	4	0	Profile
Skúli Níelsen	8 February 1937	1957	2	0	Profile
Stefán Gíslason *	15 March 1980	2002–2009	32	0	Profile
Stefán Halldórsson	11 October 1954	1983	1	0	Profile
Stefán Jóhannsson	5 November 1961	1980–1985	2	0	Profile
Stefán Logi Magnússon	5 September 1980	2008–2012	10	0	Profile
Stefán Örn Sigurðsson	20 February 1954	1978	1	0	Profile
Stefán Þórðarson	27 March 1975	1998–2008	6	1	Profile
Steinar Adolfsson	25 January 1970	1991–1999	14	1	Profile
Steinar Jóhannsson	31 May 1952	1971–1973	2	1	Profile
Steinar Þór Guðgeirsson	19 August 1971	1991	1	0	Profile
Steingrímur Birgisson	13 December 1964	1984–1990	3	1	Profile
Steingrímur Björnsson	26 June 1941	1960–1962	4	1	Profile
Steingrímur Jóhannesson	14 June 1973	1998	1	0	Profile
Steinþór Freyr Þorsteinsson	29 July 1985	2009–2014	8	0	Profile
Sveinbjörn Hákonarson	1 November 1957	1983–1992	10	1	Profile
Sveinn Helgason	14 November 1924	1946–1953	7	0	Profile
Sveinn Jónsson	1 September 1937	1958–1963	12	1	Profile
Sveinn Teitsson *	1 March 1931	1953–1964	23	2	Profile
Sverrir Garðarsson	15 September 1984	2007	1	0	Profile
Sverrir Ingi Ingason	5 August 1993	2014–	18	3	Profile
Sverrir Sverrison *	31 December 1969	1996–2001	17	0	Profile
Sæbjörn Guðmundsson	5 April 1961	1982–1984	2	2	Profile
Sæmundur Gíslason	13 November 1920	1946–1951	6	0	Profile
Sævar Jónsson *	22 July 1958	1980–1992	69	1	Profile
Sævar Tryggvason	1 June 1947	1969–1971	2	0	Profile
Sævar Þór Gíslason	26 December 1975	2001–2002	7	0	Profile
Sölvi Ottesen	18 February 1984	2005–2016	28	0	Profile
Teitur Þórðarson *	14 January 1952	1972–1985	41	9	Profile
Theódór Elmar Bjarnason	4 March 1987	2007–	40	1	Profile
Tómas Ingi Tómasson	7 June 1969	1990–1992	2	0	Profile
Tómas Pálsson	4 September 1950	1971–1979	6	2	Profile
Trausti Haraldsson	24 January 1957	1979–1984	20	0	Profile
Trausti Ívarsson	4 November 1962	1982	2	0	Profile
Tryggvi Guðmundsson *	30 July 1974	1997–2008	42	12	Profile
Tryggvi Hrafn Haraldsson	30 September 1996	2017–	3	1	Profile
Unnsteinn Kárason	30 August 1963	1984	1	0	Profile
Valdimar Kristófersson	22 March 1970	1991–1992	2	0	Profile
Valur Gíslason	8 September 1977	2000–2010	5	0	Profile
Valur Valsson *	24 December 1961	1984–1992	14	0	Profile
Valþór Sigþórsson	3 March 1956	1984	1	0	Profile
Veigar Páll Gunnarsson	21 March 1980	2001–2011	34	6	Profile
Victor Pálsson	30 April 1991	2014–2017	6	0	Profile
Viðar Ari Jónsson	10 March 1994	2017–	5	0	Profile
Viðar Halldórsson *	23 May 1953	1976–1983	27	0	Profile
Viðar Þorkelsson	29 January 1963	1986–1990	26	0	Profile
Viðar Örn Kjartansson	11 March 1990	2014–	18	2	Profile
Vilhjálmur Kjartansson	30 May 1952	1976	1	0	Profile
Þorbergur Atlason	24 December 1947	1968–1972	13	0	Profile
Þorgrímur Þráinsson	8 January 1959	1981–1990	17	0	Profile
Þormóður Árni Egilsson	10 August 1969	1990–1994	8	0	Profile
Þorsteinn Bjarnason	22 March 1957	1978–1986	28	0	Profile
Þorsteinn Friðþjófsson	24 February 1940	1965–1970	9	0	Profile
Þorsteinn Guðjónsson	5 June 1969	1988–1996	4	0	Profile
Þorsteinn Ólafsson	15 March 1951	1971–1980	16	0	Profile
Þorsteinn Þorsteinsson	7 July 1964	1982–1988	9	0	Profile
Þorvaldur Sigbjörnsson	26 November 1974	2002	1	0	Profile
Þorvaldur Örlygsson	2 August 1966	1987–1995	41	7	Profile
Þórarinn Ingi Valdimarsson	23 April 1990	2012–2016	4	0	Profile
Þórður Guðjónsson *	14 October 1973	1993–2004	58	13	Profile
Þórður Jónsson	29 November 1934	1955–1962	13	2	Profile
Þórður Jónsson	2 March 1945	1967	1	0	Profile
Þórður Marelsson	21 January 1958	1983	1	0	Profile
Þórður Þórðarson	26 November 1930	1951–1958	18	11	Profile
Þórður Þórðarson	10 April 1972	1996	1	0	Profile
Þórhallur Dan Jóhannsson	5 December 1972	1996–2002	2	0	Profile
Þórhallur Einarsson	16 March 1921	1946	1	0	Profile
Þórhallur Örn Hinriksson	10 September 1976	2000–2001	5	1	Profile
Þórir Jónsson	25 March 1952	1970–1972	2	0	Profile
Þórólfur Beck *	21 January 1940	1959–1969	20	5	Profile
Þröstur Stefánsson	27 September 1944	1971	5	0	Profile
Ævar Ingi Jóhannesson	31 January 1995	2016	1	0	Profile
Ögmundur Kristinsson	23 December 1953	1983	1	0	Profile
Ögmundur Kristinsson	19 June 1989	2014–	15	0	Profile
Örn Óskarsson	18 February 1953	1972–1982	23	1	Profile
Örn Steinsen	11 January 1940	1959–1961	8	1	Profile
