= Jón =

- Gender: Male

Origin
- Origin: Old Norse

Other names
- Related names: Johannes, John, Johan, Jonsi

Jón is an Old Norse common name still widely used in Iceland and the Faroes. According to Icelandic custom, people named Jón are generally referred to by first and middle names and those without a middle name are referred to with both first name and patronym disambiguation is required.

Jón is derived from the name Johannes (English John) with the original meaning being God (Yahweh) is gracious. The name is one of the most frequently given names in Iceland. In 2002, it was ranked first before Sigurður and Guðmundur.

== People with the name Jón ==
=== Kings ===
- Jón I of Sweden

=== Others ===
- Jón Hnefill Aðalsteinsson (1927–2010), Icelandic scholar and folklorist
- Jón Jónsson Aðils (1869–1920), Icelandic historian
- Jón Arason (c. 1484–1550), Icelandic bishop
- Jón Árnason, multiple people
- Jón Baldursson (1954–2023), Icelandic bridge player
- Jón Atli Benediktsson (born 1960), Icelandic academic
- Jón Þór Birgisson (born 1975), Icelandic musician (Sigur Rós)
- Jón Bjarnason (born 1943), Icelandic politician
- Jón Daði Böðvarsson (born 1992), Icelandic footballer
- Jón Didriksson (born 1955), Icelandic middle-distance runner
- Jón Halldór Eðvaldsson (born 1975), Icelandic basketball coach
- Jón Eyþórsson (1895–1968), Icelandic meteorologist
- Jón Ferrier, Gulf Keystone Petroleum CEO
- Jón Guðni Fjóluson (born 1989), Icelandic footballer
- Jón Gerreksson (1378–1433), Danish-Icelandic bishop
- Jón Gnarr (born 1967), Icelandic comedian
- Jón Axel Guðmundsson (born 1996), Icelandic basketball player
- Jón Ingi Guðmundsson (1909–1989), Icelandic water polo player
- Jón Guðmundsson (1904–1980), Icelandic chess player
- Jón lærði Guðmundsson, Medieval Icelandic scholar, poet, and alleged sorcerer
- Jón Gunnarsson (born 1956), Icelandic politician
- Jón Gunnlaugsson (born 1949), Icelandic footballer
- Jón Halldórsson, multiple people
- Jón Baldvin Hannibalsson (born 1939), Icelandic politician
- Jón Helgason, multiple people
- Jón korpur Hrafnsson, son of Þuríður Sturludóttir
- Jón Hreggviðsson, character in Iceland's Bell by Halldór Laxness
- Jón Arnar Ingvarsson (born 1972), Icelandic basketball player and coach
- Jón Rói Jacobsen (born 1983), Faroese football defender
- Jón Ásgeir Jóhannesson (born 1968), CEO of Baugur Group
- Jón Atli Jónasson (born 1972), Icelandic playwright and screenwriter
- Jón Jónsen (1896–1981), Icelandic-Danish long-distance runner
- Jón Jónsson (born 1985), Icelandic singer
- Jón Sveinbjørn Jónsson (1955–2008), Norwegian poet, children's writer and translator
- Jón Jónsson (water polo) (1908–1973), Icelandic water polo player
- Jón Kr. Gíslason (born 1962), Icelandic basketball player and coach
- Jón Kristinsson (born 1936), Icelandic architect
- Jón Kristinsson (chess player) (born 1942), Icelandic chess player
- Jón Halldór Kristjánsson (born 1942), Icelandic politician
- Jón Kristjánsson (1920–1996), Icelandic cross country skier
- Jón Laxdal, multiple people
- Jón Leifs (1899–1968), Icelandic composer
- Jón Leósson (1935–2013), Icelandic footballer
- Jón Loftsson (1124–1197), Icelandic chieftain at Oddi
- Jón Magnússon, multiple people
- Jon Oddsson (born 1958), Icelandic multi-sport athlete
- Jón Oddsson Hjaltalín (1749–1835), Icelandic priest and writer
- Jón Ögmundsson, Icelandic bishop
- Jón Ólafsson, multiple people
- Jón Pauli Olsen (born 1968), Faroese footballer and manager
- Jón frá Pálmholti, Icelandic writer
- Jón Pétursson, multiple people
- Jón Erling Ragnarsson (born 1964), Icelandic footballer
- Jón Páll Sigmarsson (1960–1993), Icelandic weightlifter and powerlifter
- Jón Trausti Sigurðarson (born 1982), Icelandic newspaper editor
- Jón Sigurðsson, multiple people
- Jón Jósep Snæbjörnsson (born 1977), Icelandic musician
- Jón Stefánsson, multiple people
- Jón Steinsson, American academic
- Jón Sveinsson (1857–1944), Icelandic author
- Jón Margeir Sverrisson (born 1992), Icelandic Paralympic swimmer
- Jón Thoroddsen, multiple people
- Jón Þorláksson (1877–1935), Icelandic Prime Minister
- Jón Dagur Þorsteinsson (born 1998), Icelandic footballer
- Jón Steindór Valdimarsson (born 1958), Icelandic politician
- Jón Valgeir Williams (born 1973), Icelandic strongman
- Jón Pétur Zimsen, Icelandic politician

== See also ==
- Jon
