= 2000 Icelandic Cup =

Coca-Cola bikar

Tournament details
- Country: Iceland

Final positions
- Champions: ÍA
- Runners-up: ÍBV

The 2000 Coca-Cola bikar was the 41st season of the Icelandic national football cup. It started on 23 May 2000 and concluded with the final on 24 September 2000. The winners qualified for the qualifying round of the 2001–02 UEFA Cup.

== First round ==
Team 1	Score	Team 2
23 May 2000
Breiðablik U23	2–3	HSH
Bruni	1–0	ÍH
Víðir	2–2 (a.e.t.); 3−2 (pen)	Víkingur Reykjavík U23
Þróttur U23	1–2	KR U23
Haukar Hafnarfjörður	0–1	Afturelding
KFS	6–1	Barðaströnd
Hvöt	2–0	Neisti H.
UMF Njarðvík	1–1 (a.e.t.); 3−4 (pen)	Fram U23
Valur U23	2–0	Ægir/Hamar
Leiknir F.	3–2	KVA
Þróttur Vogum	1–16	Selfoss
KS	3–1	Magni Grenivík
25 May 2000
ÍBV U23	3–3 (a.e.t.); 3−1 (pen)	Keflavík U23

== Second round ==
Team 1	Score	Team 2
3 June 2000
ÍBV U23	6–1	Bruni
Leiknir F.	1–3	Þróttur Neskaupstað
Stjarnan U23	1–5	ÍA U23
4 June 2000
Grindavík	1–3	Afturelding
Fylkir U23	1–2	KR U23
Valur U23	5–2	KÍB
þór Akureyri	5–0	Hvöt
Fram U23	5–0	Reynir Sandgerði
HSH	2–1	GG
5 June 2000
HK	2–1	Selfoss
Sindri	3–0	Huginn/Höttur
KS	0–1	Tindastóll
Léttir	0–1	Leiknir Reykjavík
Skallagrímur	1–3	Þróttur
Víðir	6–3	Grótta
6 June 2000
KFS	0–2	Fjölnir

== Third round ==
Team 1	Score	Team 2
13 June 2000
Fram U23	1–4	FH
14 June 2000
Tindastóll	1–2	ÍA
Þróttur Neskaupstað	0–3	KR
Sindri	1–0	ÍR
Valur U23	0–7	Leiftur
Þróttur	0–2	KA
Víðir	0–5	ÍBV
Fjölnir	0–6	Dalvík
15 June 2000
ÍA U23	2–3 (a.e.t.)	Valur
Þór Akureyri	1–2	Víkingur Reykjavík
HSH	0–4	Keflavík ÍF
ÍBV U23	0–1	Fram
HK	1–2	Stjarnan
KR U23	2–5	Grindavík
Leiknir Reykjavík	0–4	Breiðablik
Afturelding	0–5	Fylkir

== Fourth round ==
Team 1	Score	Team 2
3 July 2000
KR	1–2	Keflavík ÍF
4 July 2000
Stjarnan	0–2	FH
Víkingur	2–3 (a.e.t.)	Valur
5 July 2000
Fylkir	2–0	KA
ÍA	4–1	Dalvík
Fram	0–2	Grindavík
Leiftur	2–4	ÍBV
Sindri	0–1 (a.e.t.)	Breiðablik

== Quarter-finals ==
12 August 2000

Breiðablik	0–2	Fylkir
		Tómasson 74'; Einarsson 88'

Kópavogsvöllur, Kópavogur
Referee: Kristinn Jakobsson

13 August 2000

Grindavík	1–1 (a.e.t.)	ÍA
Sigurðsson 55' (o.g.)		Jónsson 57'
Penalties
	2–4

Grindavíkurvöllur, Grindavík
Referee: Eyjólfur Ólafsson

13 August 2000

ÍBV	4–1	Valur
Jóhannesson 32', 79'; Mileta 72'; Bragason 90'		Guðmundsson 7'

Hásteinsvöllur, Vestmannaeyjar
Referee: Egill Már Markússon

14 August 2000

Keflavík ÍF	1–1 (a.e.t.)	FH
Steinarsson 16'		Stefánsson 88'
Penalties
	7–8

Keflavíkurvöllur, Keflavík
Referee: Bragi Bergmann

== Semi-finals ==
5 September 2000

ÍBV	2–1	Fylkir
Sigurðsson 86'; Tómasson 88'		Óskarsson 11'

Hásteinsvöllur, Vestmannaeyjar
Referee: Gylfi Þór Orrason

6 September 2000

ÍA	1–1 (a.e.t.)	FH
Arge 90'		Stefánsson 66'
Penalties
	5–3

Akranesvöllur, Akranes
Referee: Kristinn Jakobsson

== Final ==
24 September 2000

ÍA	2–1	ÍBV
Aðalsteinsson 56'; Reynisson 89'		Viðarsson 62'

Laugardalsvollur, Reykjavík
Attendance: 4,632
Referee: Eyjólfur Ólafsson

GK
DF
DF
DF
DF
MF
MF
MF
MF
FW
FW
Substitutes:
MF
Manager:
(Iceland) Ólafur Þórðarson

(Iceland) Ólafur Þór Gunnarsson
(Iceland) Sturlaugur Haraldsson
(Iceland) Sigurður Jónsson
(Iceland) Gunnlaugur Jónsson
(Iceland) Pálmi Haraldsson
(Iceland) Alexander Högnason	Booked
(Iceland) Jóhannes Harðarson	(substituted off) 40'
(Iceland) Kári Steinn Reynisson
(Iceland) Grétar Steinsson
(Faroe Islands) Uni Arge
(Iceland) Baldur Aðalsteinsson
(Iceland) Haraldur Hinriksson	(substituted on) 40'

GK	(Iceland) Birkir Kristinsson
DF	(Iceland) Páll Almarsson	Booked	(substituted off) 89'
DF	(Iceland) Hlynur Stefánsson
DF	(Iceland) Kjartan Antonsson
DF	(Iceland) Páll Guðmundsson	Booked	(substituted off) 81'
MF	(Iceland) Ingi Sigurðsson
MF	(Iceland) Bjarni Geir Viðarsson
MF	(Iceland) Baldur Bragason
FW	(Federal Republic of Yugoslavia) Goran Aleksić
FW	(Iceland) Steingrímur Jóhannesson
FW	(Federal Republic of Yugoslavia) Momir Mileta	Booked
Substitutes:
FW	(Iceland) Tómas Ingi Tómasson		(substituted on) 89'
MF	(Iceland) Hjalti Jónsson		(substituted on) 81'
Manager:
(Iceland) Kristinn Rúnar Jónsson

Match rules

- 90 minutes.
- 30 minutes of extra-time if necessary.
- Penalty shootout if scores still level.
