= Árni =

Árni [ˈau(r)tnɪ] is an Icelandic given name of Old Norse ([ˈɑːrne]) origin. Notable people with the name include:

- Árni Gautur Arason (born 1975), Icelandic footballer
- Árni Már Árnason (born 1987), Icelandic swimmer
- Árni Páll Árnason (born 1966), Icelandic politician
- Árni Þór Árnason (born 1961), Icelandic alpine skier
- Árni Ólafur Ásgeirsson (1972–2021), Icelandic film director
- Árni beiskur (died 1253), Icelandic killer
- Árni Bergmann (born 1935), Icelandic writer and literary translator
- Árni Björnsson (born 1932), Icelandic writer
- Árni Böðvarsson (1924–1992), Icelandic educator, grammarian and dictionary editor
- Árni Frederiksberg (born 1992), Faroese footballer
- Árni Gunnarsson (1940–2022), Icelandic journalist and politician
- Árni Halldórsson (1630–1687), Icelandic priest
- Árni Þór Hallgrímsson (born 1968), Icelandic badminton player
- Árni Helgason (1260–1320), Roman Catholic bishop
- Árni Grétar Jóhannesson (1983–2025), Icelandic electronic musician
- Árni Steinar Jóhannsson (1953–2015), Icelandic politician
- Árni Johnsen (1944–2023), Icelandic politician
- Árni Lárentíusson (born 1304), Icelandic writer
- Árni Magnússon (1663–1730), Icelandic scholar and manuscript collector
- Árni Magnússon (politician) (born 1965), Icelandic politician
- Árni Mathiesen (born 1958), Icelandic politician
- Árni Njálsson (born 1936), Icelandic footballer
- Árni Óðinsson (born 1950), Icelandic skier
- Árni Sigfússon (born 1956), Icelandic politician
- Árni Sigurðsson (swimmer) (born 1965), Icelandic swimmer
- Árni Sigurðsson (alpine skier) (born 1941), Icelandic alpine skier
- Árni Þór Sigurðsson (born 1960), Icelandic diplomat
- Árni Stefánsson (born 1953), Icelandic footballer
- Árni Sveinsson (born 1956), Icelandic footballer
- Árni Thorsteinsson (1870–1962), Icelandic composer
- Arni Thorvaldsson (born 1984), Icelandic alpine skier
- Árni Vilhjálmsson (born 1994), Icelandic footballer
- Árni Þórarinsson (born 1950), Icelandic writer
- Árni Þorláksson (1237–1298), Icelandic Roman Catholic bishop

As a middle name

- Einar Árni Jóhannsson (born 1977), Icelandic basketball coach
- Guðjón Árni Antoníusson (born 1983), Icelandic footballer and manager
- Guðmundur Árni Stefánsson (born 1955), Icelandic politician and diplomat
- Hilmar Árni Halldórsson (born 1992), Icelandic footballer
- Magnús Árni Magnússon (born 1968), Icelandic politician
- Matthías Árni Mathiesen (1931–2011), Icelandic politician
- Þormóður Árni Egilsson (born 1969), Icelandic footballer
- Þormóður Árni Jónsson (born 1983), Icelandic judoka

== See also ==
- Arni (disambiguation)
- Arne, the mainland Scandinavian version of the name
- Arnie, given name
