= Kjartansson =

Kjartansson is an Icelandic patronymic surname. Notable people with the surname include:

- Ársæll Kjartansson (born 1945), Icelandic former football player
- Jón Kjartansson (1930–2004), Icelandic writer, better known as Jón frá Pálmholti
- Magnús Kjartansson (1919–1981), Icelandic politician and former minister
- Ragnar Kjartansson (disambiguation), various persons, including:
  - Ragnar Kjartansson (sculptor) (1923–1989), Icelandic sculptor
  - Ragnar Kjartansson (performance artist) (born 1976), Icelandic performance artist
- Sigurjón Kjartansson (born 1968), Icelandic comedian, writer and producer and part of the comic duo Tvíhöfði with Jón Gnarr
