= Þorsteinn =

Þorsteinn is an Old Norse and Icelandic masculine given name. Notable people with the name include:

- Þorsteinn Bachmann (born 1965), Icelandic film actor
- Þorsteinn Bjarnason (born 1957), Icelandic footballer
- Þorsteinn Eiríksson (X century), the youngest son of Erik the Red
- Þorsteinn Erlingsson (1858–1914), Icelandic poet
- Þorsteinn Gunnarsson (born 1940), Icelandic actor and architect
- Þorsteinn Leó Gunnarsson (born 2002), Icelandic handball player
- Þorsteinn Gylfason (1942–2005), Icelandic philosopher, translator, musician and poet
- Þorsteinn Halldórsson (born 1968), Icelandic footballer
- Þorsteinn Hallgrímsson (born 1942), Icelandic basketball player
- Þorsteinn frá Hamri (1938–2018), Icelandic writer
- Þorsteinn Hjálmarsson (1911–1984), Icelandic water polo player
- Þorsteinn Gauti Hjálmarsson (born 1995), Icelandic-Finnish handball player
- Þorsteinn J. (full name Þorsteinn Jens Vilhjálmsson), Icelandic television personality
- Þorsteinn Leifsson (born 1961), Icelandic weightlifter
- Þorsteinn Löve (1923–2002), Icelandic discus thrower
- Þorsteinn Pálsson (born 1947), Prime Minister of Iceland for the Independence Party from 1987 to 1988
- Þorsteinn Sæmundsson (born 1935), Icelandic astronomer
- Þorsteinn Víglundsson (born 1969), Icelandic politician
- Þorsteinn Þorsteinsson (1880–1979), Icelandic economist and author
- Þorsteinn Þorsteinsson (athlete) (born 1947), Icelandic runner
- Þorsteinn Þorsteinsson (footballer) (1964–1979), Icelandic footballer
