= Þorsteinsson =

Þorsteinsson is an Icelandic patronymic, meaning son of Þorsteinn. In Old Norse and Icelandic names, the name is not strictly a surname as it is not a family name. Notable people with this name include:

- Björn Þorsteinsson (born 1940), Icelandic chess player
- Indriði G. Þorsteinsson (1926–2000), Icelandic novelist and short-story writer
- Jón Dagur Þorsteinsson (born 1998), Icelandic footballer
- Klængur Þorsteinsson (1102–1176), Icelandic Roman Catholic clergyman; bishop of Iceland 1152–76
- Magnús Þorsteinsson (born 1961), Icelandic businessman; chairman and boardmember of several large businesses
- Pétur Þorsteinsson (born 1955), Icelandic priest and neologist; leader of an Icelandic language movement
- Skúli Þórsteinsson (fl. 11th century), Icelandic poet and warrior
- Þorbjörn Þorsteinsson (died 1158), Orcadian (of Orkney) pirate
- Þorsteinn Þorsteinsson (1880–1979), Icelandic economist and Esperantist
- Þorsteinn Þorsteinsson (athlete) (born 1947), Icelandic athlete who competed in the 800 metres
- Þorsteinn Þorsteinsson (footballer) (born 1964), Icelandic footballer
