= Baldur (given name) =

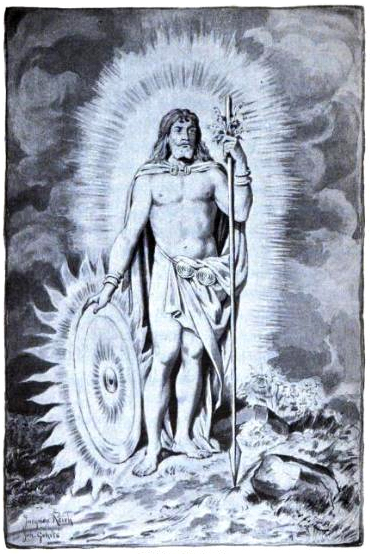
- Baldr is a Norse god associated with light, beauty, love, and happiness.
- Gender: male
- Language: Old Norse

Origin
- Meaning: "prince"

Other names
- See also: Balder, Baldr

Baldur is a Norse and Icelandic name, meaning "prince." Baldr is also a god in Norse mythology, associated with light, beauty, love and happiness.

== Variants ==
- Balder Norse
- Baldr Norse [ˈbɑldr]
- Baldur Norse, Icelandic [ˈpaltʏr̥]

== People with the given name ==
- Baldur Ingimar Aðalsteinsson (born 1980), Icelandic footballer
- Baldur Ágústsson, Icelandic businessman
- Baldur Bett (born 1980), Icelandic footballer
- Baldur Þór Bjarnason (born 1969), Icelandic footballer
- Baldur Bragason (born 1968), Icelandic former footballer
- Baldur Brönnimann (born 1968), Swiss conductor
- Baldur Hermans (1938–2015), German historian
- Baldur Hönlinger (1905–1990), Austrian chess player
- Baldur Ingi Jónasson (born 1972), Icelandic basketball player and coach
- Baldur Möller (1914–1999), Icelandic chess player
- Baldur Preiml (1939–2025), Austrian ski jumper
- Baldur Ragnarsson (1930–2018), Icelandic poet
- Baldur Þór Ragnarsson (born 1990), Icelandic basketball coach
- Baldur von Schirach (1907–1974), German Nazi politician
- Baldur Sigurðsson (born 1985), Icelandic footballer
- Baldur Springmann (1912–2003), German farmer and neo-Nazi politician
- Baldur R. Stefansson (1917–2002), Canadian agronomist
- Baldur Þórhallsson (born 1968), Icelandic professor

== See also ==
- Baldur (disambiguation)
- Balder (disambiguation)
