= Atli =

Atli is an Old Norse masculine personal name derived from Attila, and may refer to:

== People ==
- Atli Barkarson (born 2001), Icelandic footballer
- Atli Viðar Björnsson (born 1980), Icelandic footballer
- Atli Dam (1932–2005), Prime Minister of the Faroe Islands
- Atli Danielsen (born 1983), Faroese footballer
- Atli Eðvaldsson (1957–2019), Icelandic footballer
- Atli Einarsson (born 1966), Icelandic footballer
- Atli Gíslason (born 1947), Icelandic politician
- Atli Gregersen (born 1982), Faroese footballer
- Atli Guðnason (born 1984), Icelandic footballer
- Atli Þór Héðinsson (born 1953), Icelandic footballer
- Atli Helgason (born 1967), Icelandic footballer and lawyer
- Atli Hilmarsson (born 1959), Icelandic handball player
- Atli Ingólfsson (born 1962), Icelandic composer
- Atli Knútsson (born 1975), Icelandic footballer
- Atli Örvarsson (born 1970), Icelandic composer
- Atli the Slender, 9th-century Norwegian jarl
- Atli Steinarsson (1929–2017), Icelandic swimmer
- Atli Heimir Sveinsson (1938–2019), Icelandic composer
- Atli Sveinn Þórarinsson (born 1980), Icelandic footballer

As a middle name

- Finnur Atli Magnússon (born 1985), Icelandic basketball player
- Jón Atli Benediktsson (born 2000), Icelandic academic
- Jón Atli Jónasson (born 1972), Icelandic playwright and screenwriter
- Kjartan Atli Kjartansson (born 1984), Icelandic basketball player
- Nóel Atli Arnórsson (born 2006), Icelandic footballer
- Sævar Atli Magnússon (born 2000), Icelandic footballer

== Fictional or mythological characters ==
- Atli, Attila in Old Norse legendary literature
- Atli, one of the names of the Norse god Thor
- Atli, a character in Marvel comics

== See also ==
- Atlı, a Turkish surname
