= Aðalsteinsson =

Aðalsteinsson is an Icelandic patronymic surname, literally meaning "son of Aðalsteinn". Notable people with the surname include:

- Aðalsteinn Aðalsteinsson (born 1962), Icelandic footballer
- Arnór Sveinn Aðalsteinsson (born 1986), Icelandic footballer
- Baldur Ingimar Aðalsteinsson (born 1980), Icelandic footballer
- Jón Hnefill Aðalsteinsson (1927–2010), Icelandic scholar and folklorist
- Þorbergur Aðalsteinsson (born 1956), Icelandic handball player
