= Sævar =

- Gender: Male

Origin
- Region of origin: Iceland

Sævar is an Icelandic masculine given name and may refer to:

- Sævar Birgisson (born 1988), Icelandic cross-country skier
- Sævar Þór Gíslason (born 1975), Icelandic footballer
- Sævar Jónsson (born 1958), Icelandic footballer
- Sævar Atli Magnússon, (born 2000), Icelandic footballer
