= Thorsteinson =

Thorsteinson may refer to:

== Surname ==
- Arnleifur Thorsteinson (1916–1976), Canadian actor and radio newscaster
- Chris Thorsteinson, Canadian musician of Doc Walker band
- James Thorsteinson, Canadian politician in Saskatchewan
- Joe Thorsteinson (1905–1948), Canadian ice hockey player
- Randy Thorsteinson (born 1956), Canadian politician in Alberta

== See also ==
- Thorsteinsson
- Þorsteinsson
