= 1998 Úrvalsdeild =

Úrvalsdeild
- Season: 1998
- Champions: ÍBV; 3rd title
- Relegated: Þróttur; ÍR
- Matches: 90
- Goals: 249 (2.77 per match)
- Top goalscorer: (Iceland) S. Jóhannesson (16 goals)

The 1998 season of Úrvalsdeild was the 87th season of league football in Iceland. ÍBV defended their title. ÍR and Þróttur were relegated. The competition was known as Landssímadeild, due to its sponsorship by the now-defunct company, Landssíminn.

== Final league table ==
Pos	Team	Pld	W	D	L	GF	GA	GD	Pts	Qualification or relegation
1	ÍBV (C)	18	12	2	4	40	15	+25	38	Qualification for the Champions League first qualifying round
2	KR	18	9	6	3	25	9	+16	33	Qualification for the UEFA Cup qualifying round
3	ÍA	18	8	6	4	27	22	+5	30	Qualification for the Intertoto Cup first round
4	Keflavík	18	8	4	6	19	23	−4	28	
5	Leiftur	18	7	4	7	21	21	0	25	Qualification for the UEFA Cup qualifying round
6	Fram	18	5	5	8	21	23	−2	20	
7	Grindavík	18	5	4	9	24	34	−10	19	
8	Valur	18	4	6	8	25	33	−8	18	
9	Þróttur (R)	18	4	6	8	27	39	−12	18	Relegation to 1. deild karla
10	ÍR (R)	18	4	5	9	20	30	−10	17	Relegation to 1. deild karla

Source: rsssf.com
Rules for classification: 1) points; 2) goal difference; 3) number of goals scored.
(C) Champions; (R) Relegated

== Results ==
Each team played every opponent once home and away for a total of 18 matches.

Home \ Away	FRA	GRI	ÍA	ÍBV	ÍR	ÍBK	KR	LEI	VAL	ÞRÓ
Fram		0–0	1–1	0–2	0–0	2–3	0–2	0–0	3–1	4–2
Grindavík	4–2		0–3	1–0	1–1	2–1	0–4	3–1	2–2	0–1
ÍA	0–4	3–0		1–0	2–1	1–1	1–1	1–0	1–1	2–2
ÍBV	2–0	2–0	3–1		4–1	4–0	3–1	2–0	6–1	3–0
ÍR	0–3	4–2	1–1	1–0		1–2	0–1	1–1	3–2	2–2
Keflavík	1–0	3–0	0–1	0–3	1–0		1–0	1–0	2–2	1–5
KR	2–0	1–1	2–0	0–2	3–0	0–0		1–0	0–0	1–1
Leiftur	2–0	3–2	0–4	5–1	1–0	1–1	0–0		2–1	3–1
Valur	1–2	2–0	4–2	0–0	1–3	0–1	0–3	1–0		3–3
Þróttur	0–0	1–6	1–2	3–3	3–1	1–0	0–3	1–2	0–3	

Legend: Blue = home team win; Yellow = draw; Red = away team win.

== Top goalscorers ==
Rank	Player	Club	Goals
1	(Iceland) Steingrímur Jóhannesson	ÍBV	16
2	(Iceland) Tómas Ingi Tómasson	Þróttur	14
3	(Iceland) Ásmundur Arnarsson	Fram	8
4	(Iceland) Arnór Guðjohnsen	Valur	7
4	(Iceland) Sigurður Ragnar Eyjólfsson	ÍA	7
4	(Iceland) Guðmundur Benediktsson	KR	7
7	(Iceland) Sævar Þór Gíslason	ÍR	6

1998 Landssímadeild winners
ÍBV
3rd title
