= Þorsteinn Þorsteinsson (disambiguation) =

Þorsteinn Þorsteinsson may refer to:

- Þorsteinn Þorsteinsson (1880–1979), Icelandic economist and Esperantist
- Þorsteinn Þorsteinsson (athlete) (born 1947), Icelandic athlete who competed in the 800 metres
- Þorsteinn Þorsteinsson (footballer) (born 1964), Icelandic footballer
