= Atli (disambiguation) =

Atli or variation, may refer to:

- Atli, an Old Norse given name
- Atlı, a Turkish surname
- Atli, another spelling for Attila
- Lay of Atli, a heroic poem of the Poetic Edda
- Greenlandic Poem of Atli, a heroic poem of the Poetic Edda
- Doğan Seyfi Atlı Stadium, Denizli, Turkey; a soccer stadium

== See also ==
- Alti
