= Heimir Guðjónsson =

Heimir Guðjónsson may refer to:

- Heimir Guðjónsson (footballer, born 1937), Icelandic football player
- Heimir Guðjónsson (footballer, born 1969), Icelandic football player and coach
