= Sif Atladóttir =

Icelandic footballer (born 1985)

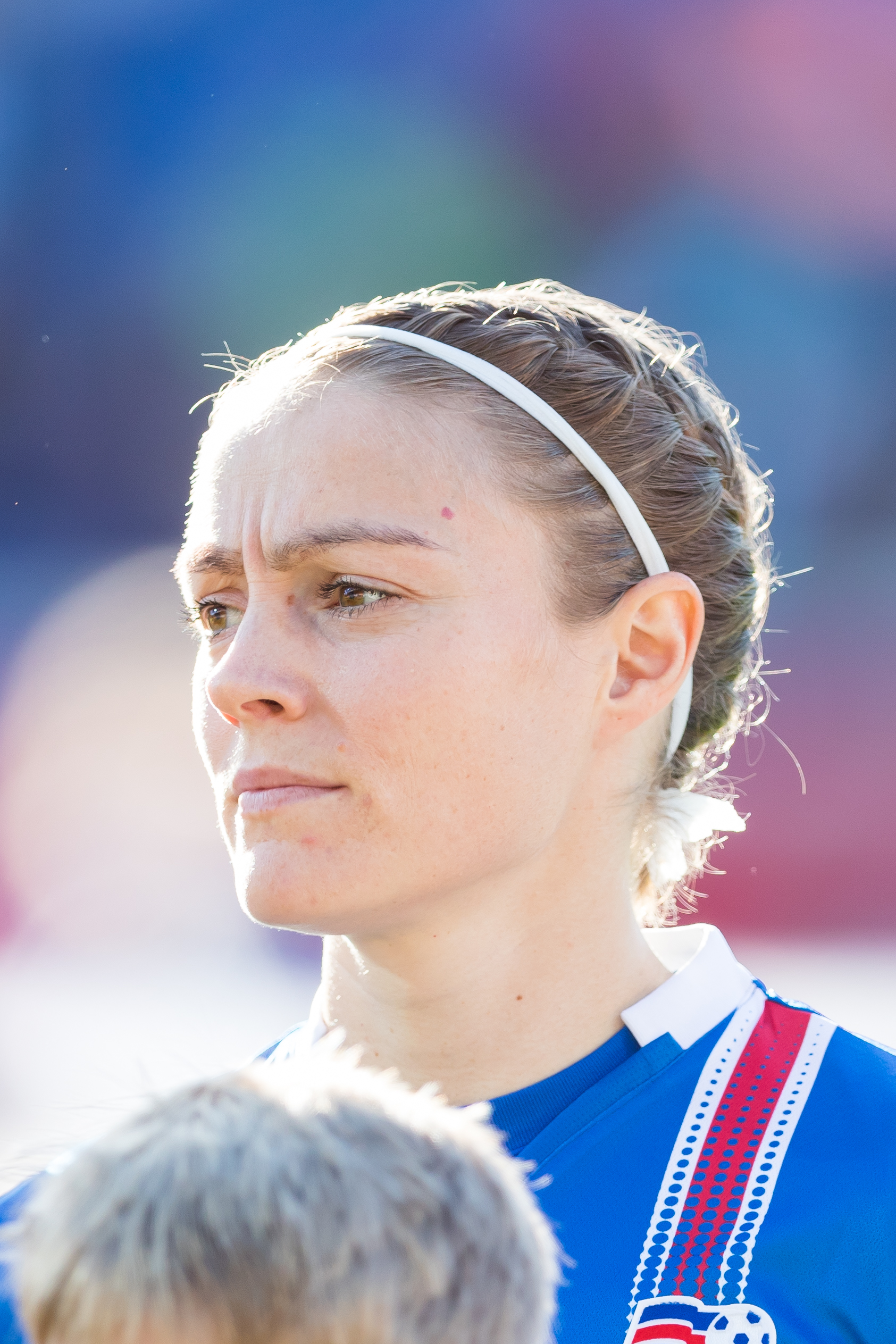
- Sif in October 2017.

Personal information
- Full name: Sif Atladóttir
- Date of birth: 15 July 1985 (age 41)
- Place of birth: Düsseldorf, West Germany
- Height: 1.62 m (5 ft 4 in)
- Position: Full back

Senior career*
Years	Team	Apps	(Gls)
2000–2003	FH	22	(5)
2004	KR	14	(8)
2005	FH	12	(4)
2006	Þróttur R.	13	(12)
2007–2009	Valur	49	(6)
2010–2011	1. FC Saarbrücken	30	(2)
2011–2021	Kristianstads DFF	151	(2)
2022–2024	Selfoss	50	(0)

International career^{‡}
2003–2004	Iceland U-19	6	(1)
2006	Iceland U-21	4	(1)
2007–2022	Iceland	90	(0)
- * Club domestic league appearances and goals as of 16 September 2023 ‡ National team caps and goals as of 16 September 2023

Sif Atladóttir (born 15 July 1985) is an Icelandic former footballer and a former member of the Iceland women's national team. During her career, she won the Icelandic Championship three years in a row with Valur, from 2007 to 2009.

== Club career ==
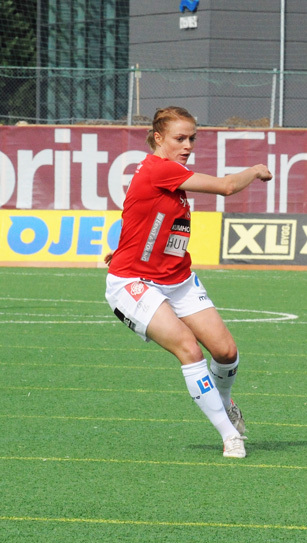
Sif playing for Kristianstads in 2013

Sif, who began her career as a forward but later developed into a pacey full back, left Icelandic club Valur for German side 1. FC Saarbrücken in the 2009–10 winter transfer window.

In 2011, she moved to Kristianstads DFF following Saarbrücken's relegation. She missed the 2020 season due to being pregnant with her second child. She returned to the court in April 2021 in her first competitive game since October 2019.

In October 2021, Sif announced that she was moving to Iceland after 12 years playing abroad.

After playing two seasons for Selfoss, she announced her retirement from football at the conclusion of the 2023 Besta deild kvenna season. However, she returned the following season, appearing in 12 games in the second-tier 1. deild.

== International career ==
Sif is currently part of Iceland's national team and competed in the UEFA Women's Championships in 2009 and 2013.

She made her senior national team debut in a 2–1 defeat to Italy at the Algarve Cup in March 2007.

On 23 January 2018, Sif played her seventieth game for the national team, the same number of games her father played for the men's national team.

In September 2022, she announced her retirement from the national team.

== Personal life ==
Sif is the daughter of Atli Eðvaldsson, former captain and coach of the men's national team. She was born in Germany while her father was playing professionally for Fortuna Düsseldorf.

Her brother Emil Atlason is also a footballer who plays for KR and the Iceland national under-21 football team, while sister Sara Atladóttir played for FH and the women's under-17 and under-19 national teams. Uncle Jóhannes "Shuggy" Eðvaldsson played for Celtic.

== Titles ==
- Icelandic Champion: (3)

- 2007, 2008, 2009

- Icelandic Cup:

- 2009

- Icelandic Super Cup: (3)

- 2007, 2008, 2009

- Icelandic League Cup:

- 2007
