= Balder (disambiguation) =

Baldr, Balder or Baldur is a Norse god.

Balder or Baldr may also refer to:

== People ==
- Balder (surname)
- Balder Tomasberg (1897–1919), Estonian artist

== Places ==
- Balderfonna, a glacier in Svalbard, Norway
- Balder Formation, a geological formation in the North Sea off Great Britain
- Balder Point, a headland in Antarctica
- Mount Baldr, Baffin Island, Canada
- Mount Baldr (Antarctica), Asgard range, Antarctica
- River Balder, in County Durham, England

== Plants ==
- Polistes balder, a species of paper wasp
- Ulmus × hollandica 'Balder', an elm cultivar

== Vehicles ==
- Balder (roller coaster), in Sweden
- Balder Viking or CCGS Jean Goodwill, an icebreaking anchor handling tug supply vessel converted to a medium class icebreaker
- DCV Balder, a 1978 deepwater construction vessel
- MS Balder Sten or MS Phocine, a ferry built in 1985

== Fiction ==
- Balder (character), a Marvel Comics character
- Baldr video game series, including Baldr Force, Baldr Bullet and Baldr Sky
- Baldur, a character in the 2018 video game God of War

== See also ==
- Baldur (disambiguation)
- Baldur (given name), the origin of the name
