= Baldur's Gate (disambiguation) =

Baldur's Gate may refer to:

- Baldur's Gate, a city in the Forgotten Realms campaign setting for Dungeons & Dragons
- Baldur's Gate, a video game series set in the Forgotten Realms
  - Baldur's Gate (video game), the first game released in 1998
- Baldur's Gate (novel), the novelization of the first video game in the series by Philip Athans
- Baldur's Gate: Descent into Avernus, a 2019 Dungeons & Dragons tabletop adventure
- Baldur's Gate, a 1970 novel by Eleanor Clark set in Jordan Village, Connecticut, that features a sculptor named Baldur
- Baldur's Gate, a 2021 single by English post-punk band Shame

== See also ==
- Baldur (disambiguation)
