= Kristján Jónsson =

Kristján Jónsson may refer to:

- Kristján Jónsson (politician) (1852–1926), Icelandic politician
- Kristján Jónsson (footballer) (born 1963), Icelandic footballer
