= Brandur (given name) =

- Gender: Male
- Language: Faroese, Icelandic

Origin
- Origin: Old Norse
- Region of origin: Faroe Islands, Iceland

Other names
- Related names: Brandr

Brandur (Icelandic pronunciation: [ˈprantʏr̥]) is a Faroese and Icelandic masculine given name. Notable people with the name include:

- Brandur Brynjólfsson (1916–1999), Icelandic footballer
- Brandur Enni (born 1989), Faroese musician
- Brandur Hendriksson (born 1995), Faroese footballer
- Brandur Sandoy (born 1973), Faroese politician, sheep farmer, and businessman
