= Thorsteinsson =

Thorsteinsson and Thorsteinsen are patronymic surnames of Scandinavian origin, meaning son of Thorsteinn. In Old Norse and Icelandic names, Þorsteinsson (anglicised Thorsteinsson) is a patronymic, not a family name. Notable people with the names include:

== Thorsteinsson ==
- Björn Thorsteinsson (born 1940), Icelandic chess master
- Raymond Thorsteinsson, Canadian geologist of the Arctic regions
- Steingrímur Thorsteinsson (1831–1913), Icelandic poet, author, and translator
- Thorbjorn Thorsteinsson (died 1158), Orcadian (of Orkney) pirate

== Thorsteinsen ==
- Cecilie Thorsteinsen, Norwegian team handball player
