= Bjarki =

Bjarki can be a masculine given name or a middle name. Notable people with the name include:

== Given name ==
- Bjarki Steinn Bjarkason (born 2000), Icelandic footballer
- Bjarki Már Elísson (born 1990), Icelandic handball player
- Bjarki Garðarsson (born 2010), Icelandic footballer
- Bjarki Már Gunnarsson (born 1988), Icelandic handball player
- Bjarki Gunnlaugsson (born 1973), Icelandic footballer
- Bjarki Karlsson, Icelandic poet
- Bjarki Nielsen (born 1998), Faroese footballer
- Bjarki Sigurðsson (born 1967), Icelandic handball player and coach

== Middle name ==
- Viktor Bjarki Arnarsson (born 1983), Icelandic football midfielder
- Viktor Bjarki Daðason (born 2008), Icelandic football forward
- Jón Bjarki Magnússon, Icelandic journalist

== See also ==
- Bödvar Bjarki, legendary hero in Norse mythology
