= Hermann Hermannsson =

Icelandic footballer

Personal information
- Date of birth: 7 October 1914
- Place of birth: Iceland
- Date of death: 28 August 1975 (aged 60)

International career
Years	Team	Apps	(Gls)
1946–1949	Iceland	4	(0)

Hermann Hermannsson (7 October 1914 - 28 August 1975) was an Icelandic former footballer. He was part of the Iceland national football team between 1946 and 1949. He played 4 matches.

== See also ==
- List of Iceland international footballers
