= Arani =

Arani or Aarani or Aran may refer to:

== Places ==
- Arani, Bolivia, a city in Bolivia
- Arani Municipality, a municipality in Bolivia
- Arani Province, a province in Bolivia
- Aarani, Tiruvannamalai District, a city in Tamil Nadu, India
- Arani, Chennai, a suburb of Chennai, Tiruvallur District, Tamil Nadu
- Arani River, in India

== See also ==
- Arani (name)
- Arni (disambiguation)
