= Sæmundur Gíslason =

Icelandic footballer

Personal information
- Date of birth: 13 November 1920
- Place of birth: Iceland
- Date of death: 2 February 2003 (aged 82)

International career
Years	Team	Apps	(Gls)
1946–1951	Iceland	6	(0)

Sæmundur Gíslason (13 November 1920 - 2 February 2003) was an Icelandic former footballer. He was part of the Iceland national football team between 1946 and 1951. He played 6 matches.

== See also ==
- List of Iceland international footballers
