= Sigurður Ólafsson (footballer) =

Icelandic footballer

Personal information
- Date of birth: 7 December 1916
- Place of birth: Iceland
- Date of death: 25 February 2009 (aged 92)

International career
Years	Team	Apps	(Gls)
1946–1949	Iceland	4	(0)

Sigurður Ólafsson (7 December 1916 – 25 February 2009) was an Icelandic footballer. He was part of the Iceland national football team between 1946 and 1949. He played 4 matches.

== See also ==
- List of Iceland international footballers
