= Balder (surname) =

Balder is a surname. Notable people with the surname include:

- Hugo Egon Balder (born 1950), German television presenter, producer, and comedian
- Rob Balder (born 1969), American cartoonist and singer-songwriter
- Tine Balder (1924–2021), Belgian actress

== See also ==
- Balder (disambiguation)
