= Arni =

Arni may refer to:

== Municipalities ==
- Aarani, Tiruvannamalai, a town in Tamil Nadu, India
- Arni, Maharashtra, in Yavatmal district, Maharashtra State, India
- Arni, Karditsa, a municipality in the Karditsa regional unit, Greece
- Arni, Aargau, a municipality of the canton of Aargau in Switzerland
- Arni, Bern, a municipality of the canton of Bern in Switzerland

== Other uses ==
- Árni, Icelandic given name
- a nickname for Arnold
- Arni, Clerodendrum phlomidis, a traditional Indian medicinal herb
- Arni or arnee, the wild water buffalo, Bubalus arnee
- Lake Arni or Arnisee
- ARNI, angiotensin receptor-neprilysin inhibitor: Valsartan/sacubitril

== See also ==
- Arani (disambiguation)
- Arny (disambiguation)
