= Haukur Óskarsson =

Icelandic footballer

Personal information
- Date of birth: 5 January 1915
- Place of birth: Iceland
- Date of death: 13 March 1989 (aged 74)

International career
Years	Team	Apps	(Gls)
1946–1947	Iceland	2	(0)

Haukur Óskarsson (5 January 1915 – 13 March 1989) was an Icelandic footballer. He was part of the Iceland national football team in 1946 and 1947. He played 2 matches.

== See also ==
- List of Iceland international footballers
