= Tareq Shihab =

Yemeni footballer (born 2001)

Personal information
- Date of birth: 7 March 2001 (age 25)
- Place of birth: Utrecht, Netherlands
- Height: 1.79 m (5 ft 10 in)
- Positions: Midfielder; defender

Team information
- Current team: ÍR
- Number: 46

Youth career
- 2014–2019: Brighton & Hove Albion

College career
Years	Team	Apps	(Gls)
2021	Wake Forest Demon Deacons	13	(0)

Senior career*
Years	Team	Apps	(Gls)
2019–2020	Brighton & Hove Albion	0	(0)
2019–2020	→ Tamworth (loan)	0	(0)
2022	Whitehawk	3	(0)
2022	Newhaven	5	(1)
2023–2024	Grótta	28	(0)
2024	HK	6	(0)
2025	Stallion Laguna	4	(1)
2026–	ÍR	10	(0)

International career^{‡}
- England U15
- England U16
2017	England U17	1	(0)
2024–	Yemen	2	(0)
- * Club domestic league appearances and goals as of 13 September 2026 ‡ National team caps and goals as of 20 January 2025

Tareq Shihab (Arabic: طَارِق شِهَاب; born 7 March 2001) is a professional footballer who plays a midfielder for ÍR. Born in the Netherlands and raised in England, he plays for the Yemen national team.

== Early life ==
Shihab was born in the Dutch city of Utrecht to Yemeni parents, and moved to Brighton, England at the age of two.

== Club career ==
After a trial, he joined the academy of professional side Brighton & Hove Albion in August 2014. Having made his debut for Brighton's under-18 team in the 2016–17 season, Shihab continued to progress through the academy until September 2019, when he was sent on a four-month loan to Southern Football League side Tamworth. Upon signing, Tamworth manager Gary Smith described Shihab as a "good technician, good with the ball", and that he was a "great addition to our squad". Having made his debut in the 3–0 Southern Football League Cup win over Barwell on 10 September, he only featured once more for the club before returning to Brighton & Hove Albion at the expiration of the deal on 4 January 2020.

Having been released by Brighton at the conclusion of the 2019–20 season, Shihab moved to the United States, enrolling at the Wake Forest University in Winston-Salem, North Carolina, and joined their soccer team, the Wake Forest Demon Deacons. He finished the 2021 season with thirteen appearances, in which he started two, and one assist against the George Washington Revolutionaries on 12 October.

On his return to England, he joined Isthmian League side Whitehawk, and went on to make three appearances for the team in the 2021–22 season.

After a short spell with Newhaven, he began to train with Icelandic 1. deild karla club Grótta in November 2022, before making the move to the Seltjarnarnes-based club ahead of the 2023 season, signing a two-year deal. Following two seasons with Grotta, Shihab moved to Besta deild karla side HK in August 2024.

On 14 September 2025, Shihab made his debut for Philippines Football League side Stallion Laguna.

== International career ==
Shihab represented England from under-15 to under-17 level, being named on the bench on 8 November 2017 in a 3–2 win against Portugal, before making his debut and playing ninety minutes in a 2–1 win over Russia three days later.

Shihab is of Yemeni descent, and was called up to a training camp with the Yemen national football team in May 2022. He received another call up in December of the same year, but voiced concerns of picking up an injury, and left the squad prematurely to return to England. On 9 December 2024, he made his international debut with Yemen, appearing in the 1-1 friendly game draw against Kuwait. A week after, he was named in Yemen's 26-man squad for the 26th Arabian Gulf Cup.

== Career statistics ==
=== Club ===
As of 11 October 2024.

Appearances and goals by club, season and competition
Club	Season	League			Cup		Other		Total	
Club	Season	Division	Apps	Goals	Apps	Goals	Apps	Goals	Apps	Goals
Brighton & Hove Albion	2019–20	Premier League	0	0	0	0	0	0	0	0
Tamworth (loan)	2019–20	Southern Football League	0	0	0	0	2 (Note: Appearances in the Southern Football League Cup)	0	2	0
Whitehawk	2021–22	Isthmian League	3	0	0	0	0	0	3	0
Newhaven	2022–23	SCFL	5	1	1 (Note: Appearances in FA Cup qualification)	0	2 (Note: One appearance in the Sussex RUR Cup, one appearance in the Peter Bentley Challenge Cup)	0	8	1
Grótta	2023	1. deild karla	15	0	1 (Note: Appearances in the Icelandic Cup)	0	0	0	16	0
Grótta	2024	1. deild karla	13	0	1	0	0	0	14	0
Grótta	Total		28	0	2	0	0	0	30	0
HK	2024	Besta deild karla	5	0	0	0	0	0	5	0
Career total			41	1	3	0	4	0	48	1

=== International ===
As of 20 January 2025

Appearances and goals by national team and year
National team	Year	Apps	Goals
Yemen	2024	2	0
Yemen	2025	0	0
Total		2	0
