= Evald Mikson =

Estonian footballer (1911–1993)

Personal information
- Full name: Evald Mikson
- Date of birth: 12 July 1911 (N.S.)
- Place of birth: Tartu, Governorate of Livonia, Russian Empire (now Estonia)
- Date of death: 27 December 1993 (aged 82)
- Place of death: Hafnarfjörður, Iceland
- Position: Goalkeeper

International career
Years	Team	Apps	(Gls)
1934–1938	Estonia	7	(0)

Evald Mikson (Icelandic: Eðvald Hinriksson; 12 July [O.S. 29 June] 1911 – 27 December 1993) was an Estonian athlete and police officer. A multi-sport athlete, he played basketball and football and was a goalkeeper for the Estonia national football team, winning seven caps between 1934 and 1938. During the 1941–1944 Nazi German occupation of Estonia, he has been accused of being a collaborator with Germany during his service in the police force of Estonian Self-Administration and of committing war crimes against Jews. He later emigrated to Iceland, where he became heavily involved in sports and is credited as one of the pioneers in introducing basketball to the nation.

== Early life ==
Mikson was born in Tartu, in Governorate of Livonia, then part of the Russian Empire. At a young age, he started playing sports, including football, basketball and ice hockey. At the age of 19, he joined the army where he served for one and a half year. In the 1930s he played football semi-professionally while also studying in the police academy in Tallinn. A multi-sport athlete, he also played basketball in Tallinn from 1934 to 1936. He later worked for the Estonian political police (PolPol). He escaped Estonia following the Soviet invasion of Estonia in 1940 but returned during Germany's occupation of Estonia.

Mikson escaped from Estonia to Sweden in 1944. In 1946, he was transported to the Norwegian border, where a boat to Venezuela waited. However, the boat became stranded in Iceland, and so he remained there until his death.

After moving to Iceland, he first lived in Akureyri. In 1949, he married Sigríður Bjarnadóttir and together they moved to Vestmannaeyjar where he became an athletic coach. Mikson has been credited as one of the pioneers of basketball in Iceland and was the first coach of ÍR men's basketball team that competed in the inaugural Icelandic Basketball Tournament in 1952.

== Death ==
Mikson died at St. Jósefs Hospital in Hafnarfjörður on 27 December 1993.

== War crimes allegations ==
Mikson himself claimed in 1992 that he was being called a Nazi collaborator and war criminal because of a "former colleague from the Estonian police force who is now a rich man living in Venezuela and who wanted revenge after I wrote an article about him and his crimes against Estonians in World War II".

In 1999, the Estonian International Commission for Investigation of Crimes Against Humanity singled out Mikson, along with Ain-Ervin Mere, Julius Ennok and Ervin Viks, for having signed numerous death warrants when they were members of the Political Police (Department B IV), headed by Ennok.

In 2001, the Simon Wiesenthal Center published allegations that Mikson committed war crimes against the local Jews during the German occupation of Estonia, when he was working as Deputy Head of Police in Tallinn/Harjumaa. Mikson's descendants have reportedly claimed that he had been at least on one occasion imprisoned by the Germans for hiding details about witnesses from his superiors. However, records obtained by the Simon Wiesenthal Center indicate that he was actually detained for possessing gold stolen from his Jewish victims.

== Personal life ==
Mikson had three children with his wife Sigríður Bjarnadóttir, including footballers Jóhannes Eðvaldsson, who played for Celtic F.C. in the 1970s, and Atli Eðvaldsson, s former player for Borussia Dortmund, and player and coach for the Icelandic national football team.
