= Jón Magnússon =

Jón Magnússon may refer to:

- Jón Magnússon, Earl of Orkney in 1284–c. 1300
- Jón Magnússon (author), 17th century Icelandic author
- Jón Magnússon (politician) (1859-1926), prime minister of Iceland
- Jón Arnar Magnússon (born 1969), Icelandic decathlete
- Jón Bjarki Magnússon (born 1984), Icelandic journalist and independent documentary filmmaker
- Jon Magnusson (producer), producer of I'm Sorry I Haven't A Clue
- Jón Magnússon (handballer)
- Jón Magnússon (painter), born 1966
