= Arani (name) =

Arani is an Indian, Iranian, Italian and Azerbaijani name which is used as a given name and a surname. In Azerbaijani the word refers to "aryan" and also to "someone from Aran."

People with the name include:

== Given name ==
- Aarani Satyanarayana (1898–1969), Telugu film and drama actor

== Surname ==
- Taqi Arani (1903–1940), Iranian political activist

== See also ==
- Arani
