= Ásbjörn Björnsson =

Icelandic footballer

Personal information
- Full name: Ásbjörn Björnsson
- Date of birth: 20 October 1962 (age 64)
- Place of birth: Iceland
- Position: Forward

Senior career*
Years	Team	Apps	(Gls)
1979–1983	KA	?	(?)
1984–1987	KR	48	(12)

International career
1979	Iceland U17	1	(0)
1979	Iceland U19	6	(2)
1982	Iceland	1	(0)
- * Club domestic league appearances and goals

Ásbjörn Björnsson (born 20 October 1962) is an Icelandic former footballer who played as a midfielder. He won one cap for the Iceland national football team, coming on as a substitute for Sigurjón Kristjánsson in the 4–0 win over the Faroe Islands on 2 August 1982.
