= Pétur Þorsteinsson =

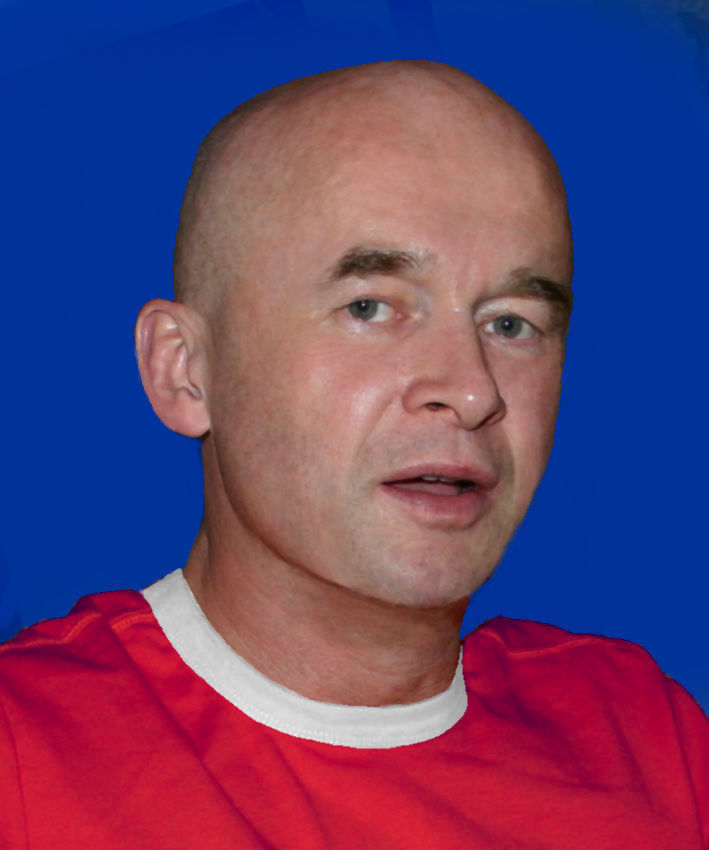
Pétur Þorsteinsson, priest of the Independent parish and neologist

Pétur Þorsteinsson (born May 5, 1955 in Borgarfjörður) is an Icelandic neologist, youth-leader and vicar of the Óháði Söfnuðurinn or Independent Parish, a Lutheran church. He published the Pétrísk-Íslensk Orðabók (Petrish-Icelandic dictionary), a list of self-made neologisms that has received much attention in Iceland. In 2004 he became president of the High Icelandic Language Movement (Háfrónska málhreyfingin), a movement that endeavours to build a variant of Icelandic that is free of loan-words. He lives in Reykjavík.
