= Ragnar Kjartansson =

Ragnar Kjartansson may refer to:

- Ragnar Kjartansson (sculptor) (1923–1989), Icelandic sculptor
- Ragnar Kjartansson (performance artist) (born 1976), Icelandic performance artist
