= Árni Björnsson =

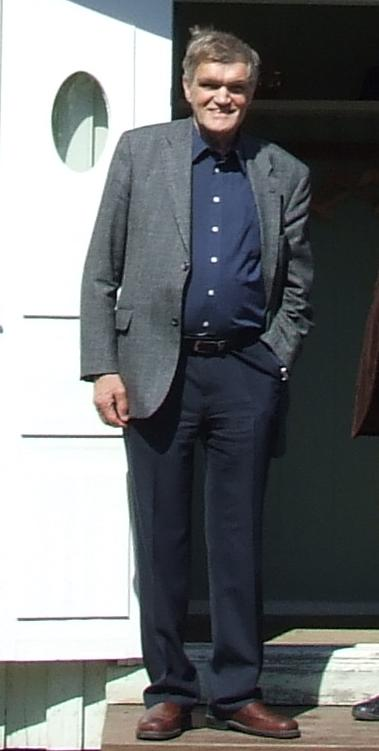
Árni Björnsson in 2011

Árni Björnsson (born January 16, 1932) is an Icelandic ethnographer. He was the director of the ethnography department of the National Museum of Iceland from 1969 to 2002. He is best known for his writings on Icelandic festivals and holidays and the customs and folk beliefs associated with them. His best-known work is probably Saga daganna (The Story of Days) (1977), which is also his doctoral thesis, which he defended in 1993.

On the occasion of Árni's 85th birthday in 2017, a large collection of his articles was published in a book entitled Í hálfkæringi og alvöru (Lighthearted and Serious). It includes sections on scholarship, poetry, cultural history, world affairs and peculiar people. Much of his work has not been translated into English.

== Publications ==
- Jól á Íslandi (Christmas in Iceland)- 1963
- Saga daganna (The Story of Days) - 1977
- Icelandic Feasts and Holidays - 1980
- Merkisdagar á mannsævinni (Significant Days in a Person's Life) 1981
- Í jólaskapi (In the Christmas Mood) with photos by Hring Jóhannesson - original version 1983
- Gamlar þjóðlífsmyndir (Old Folktales) with Halldór J. Jónssyn - 1984
- Þorrablót á Íslandi (Winter Feast in Iceland) - 1986
- Íslandsmyndir Mayers (Mayer's Images of Iceland) with Ásgeir S. Björnssyn - 1986
- Hræranlegar hátíðir (Moveable Feasts)- 1987
- Eyjar í Snæfellsnes- og Dalasýslu - Árbók Ferðafélags Íslands (Islands in Snæfellsnes and Dalasyslú - Yearbook of the Icelandic Tourist Board) - 1989
- Íslenskt vættatal (Icelandic Fairy Tales} - 1990
- Saga daganna - doctoral dissertation 1993
- High Days and Holidays in Iceland - 1995
- Merkisdagar á mannsævinni (Significant Days in a Person's Life)- extended version 1996
- Dalaheiði - Árbók Ferðafélags Íslands (Dalaheiði - Yearbook of the Icelandic Tourist Board) 1997
- Wagner og Völsungar (Wagner and the Volsungs) - 2000
- Saga jólanna (The Story of Christmas) - 2006
- Í Dali vestur - Árbók Ferðafélags Íslands (In the Dales to the West) 2011
- Sigursveinn, baráttuglaður brautryðjandi (Sigursveinn,, A Militant Pioneer). The Biography of Sigursveinn D. Kristinsson - 2017
- Í hálfkæringi og alvöru. Þættir um fræði, skáldlist, menningarsögu, heimsmálin og einkennilega menn í 85 ár - Afmælisrit (Lighthearted and Serious. Articles on scholarship, poetry, cultural history, world affairs and strange people for 85 years - Anniversary publication - 2017
- Um vésögn Sóleyjarkvæðis ("On the Omen of the Sun's Poem") - in Sun the Beautiful - edited by Silja Aðalsteinsdóttur 2017
- Söguslóðir í Dölum (Historic Trails in Dalir) - 2020
