= Brandur Brynjólfsson =

Icelandic footballer (1916–1999)

Personal information
- Date of birth: 21 December 1916
- Place of birth: Iceland
- Date of death: 27 July 1999 (aged 82)
- Position: Defender

Youth career
- Víkingur Reykjavik

Senior career*
Years	Team	Apps	(Gls)
- Víkingur Reykjavik

International career
1946	Iceland	1	(0)
- * Club domestic league appearances and goals

Brandur Brynjólfsson (21 December 1916 – 27 July 1999) was an Icelandic former footballer. He is the earliest captain of the Iceland national team, having led the team in its first International Match in 1946 at Melavöllur.

== See also ==
- List of Iceland international footballers
