= Momir Mileta =

Serbian footballer

Personal information
- Full name: Momir Mileta
- Date of birth: 14 August 1971 (age 55)
- Place of birth: Drniš, SR Croatia, SFR Yugoslavia
- Height: 1.78 m (5 ft 10 in)
- Position: Midfielder

Youth career
- Dinara
- Red Star Belgrade

Senior career*
Years	Team	Apps	(Gls)
1993	OFK Beograd		
1994–1997	Rudar Pljevlja		
1997–2002	Čukarički		
2000	→ ÍBV (loan)	17	(3)
2002–2003	Radnički Obrenovac	30	(2)
2004	Grindavík	10	(1)
- * Club domestic league appearances and goals

Momir Mileta (Serbian Cyrillic: Момир Милета; born 14 August 1971) is a Serbian former professional footballer who played as a midfielder. He was known for his powerful strikes from distance.

== Career ==
Born in Drniš, Mileta started out at nearby club Dinara before joining the youth system of Red Star Belgrade. He later played for OFK Beograd and Rudar Pljevlja in the First League of FR Yugoslavia. Between 1997 and 2002, Mileta spent five seasons with Čukarički, including a brief loan spell to ÍBV from Iceland in 2000.

== Career statistics ==
Club	Season	League	
Club	Season	Apps	Goals
OFK Beograd	1993–94		
Rudar Pljevlja	1993–94		
Rudar Pljevlja	1994–95	16	1
Rudar Pljevlja	1995–96		
Rudar Pljevlja	1996–97	26	5
Rudar Pljevlja	Total		
Čukarički	1997–98	23	1
Čukarički	1998–99		
Čukarički	1999–2000	28	0
Čukarički	2000–01		
Čukarički	2001–02		
Čukarički	Total		
Radnički Obrenovac	2002–03	30	2
Career total			
