= Jón Stefánsson =

Jón Stefánsson may refer to:

- Jón Stefánsson (artist) (1881–1962), Icelandic modern landscape artist
- Jón Arnór Stefánsson (born 1982), Icelandic basketball player
- Jón Kalman Stefánsson (born 1963), Icelandic author
- Þorgils gjallandi (Jón Stefánsson, 1851–1915), Icelandic author
- Jón Stefánsson (academic) (1862–1952), contributor to the Viking Society and author
