= Jón frá Pálmholti =

Icelandic writer (1930–2004)

Jón Kjartansson (25 May 1930 – 13 December 2004), known as Jón frá Pálmholti, was an Icelandic writer, journalist and social worker.

== Biography ==
Jón Kjartansson was born at the farm Pálmholt in Arnarneshreppur by the Eyjafjörður on 25 May 1930. His parents were the farmer Kjartan Ólafsson and Þuríður Jónsdóttir. After studying at the Laugaskóli and Iceland College of Education, he worked as a teacher from 1955 to 1957 after which he worked various jobs in parallel to being a writer. From 1979 to 1989 he was employed by the city of Reykjavík as a social worker.

Jón published his first poetry collection, Ókomnir dagar, in 1958. He was considered one of Iceland's young modernist poets alongside Þorsteinn frá Hamri and Dagur Sigurðarson. Jón wrote more than 20 books, most of them poetry collections, but his best known works also include the 1965 novel Orgelsmiðjan and the 1979 children's book Ferðin til sædýrasafnsins. His last book was the 2004 poetry collection Söngur í mannhafinu. He was active as a translator and as a journalist, writing for various Icelandic newspapers and magazines.

Socially engaged on behalf of low-income earners, he served as chairman of the Leigjendasamtakanna (lit. 'The tenants' association') from 1978 to 1985 and from 1989 to 2001. He was a board member of the Rithöfundafélag Íslands (lit. 'Writers' association of Iceland') from 1962 to 1963 and from 1971 to 1973. He co-founded the neopagan organisation Ásatrúarfélagið in 1972 and was a member of its board until 1988.

Jón had a daughter in 1959 with Steinunn Ósk Magnúsdóttir. In 1970 he married Ingibjörg Gunnþórsdóttir and they had a daughter and a son, born in 1968 and 1974. The marriage ended in divorce. Jón died in his home on 13 December 2004 at the age of 74.

== Selected publications ==
- Ókomnir dagar. Poems. 1958
- Hendur borgarinnar eru kaldar. Poems. 1961
- Orgelsmiðjan. Novel. 1965.
- Blómin við gangstíginn. Poems. 1967.
- Tilgangur lífsins. Short stories. 1968.
- Vísur Æva Tobba. 1972.
- Undir hamrinum. Poems. 1973.
- Vindurinn hvílist aldrei. Poems. 1978.
- Ferðin til sædýrasafnsins. Children's book. 1979.
- Þak yfir engið. Poems. 1980.
- Heimsmyndir. Poems. 1982.
- Lífsgrundvöllur. Poems. 1983.
- Teigahverfin. Poems. 1987.
- Ljóð og tár, þýðingar á ljóðum kúrdíska skáldsins Goran. Translation. 1991.
- Brosið í augum fuglanna. Selected poems, 1989–1992. 1992.
- Hin eilífa nútíð. Poems. 1994.
- Söngvar um lífið. Selected poems, 1958–1988. 1995.
- Og þögnin getur sungið. Poems. 2000.
- Söngur í mannhafinu. Poems. 2004.
