= Árni Thorsteinsson =

Icelandic composer

Árni Thorsteinson (October 15, 1870 – October 16, 1962) was an Icelandic composer.

He was born to Árni Thorsteinson, member of parliament, and Soffía Kristjana Johnsen, and grew up in the sheriff's House on Austurstræti in Reykjavík. Graduating from Lærða school in 1890, he went to Denmark to study law in Copenhagen. There his interests turned to music and photography. Returning in 1897, he founded a photography studio which he ran till the outbreak of the First World War. Many of the portraits he took during this period are now held at the National Museum of Iceland. Árni married Helga Einarsdóttir on September 15, 1900, and they had four children: Árna, Soffía, Jóhanna and Sigríði.

He is best known for his songs, the first of which were published in 1907. He was the first composer to set an original Icelandic saga lyric to music, anticipating Jón Leifs. The song, "Ingjaldur í skinnfeldi", was released on a 78 rpm disc in 1920.

== Selected recordings ==
7 songs - Pess bera menn sar; Kirkjuhvoll; Vorgydjan kemur; Fridur a jördu; Rosin; Fögur sem fordum; Nott. on Robert Schumann: Liederkreis nach Heine op. 24; Liederkreis op. 39. Andri Björn Robertsson, Astridur Alda Sigurdardottir. Fuga Libera CD
