= Árni Sigurðsson (swimmer) =

Icelandic swimmer

Personal information
- Born: 22 May 1965 (age 61)

Sport
- Sport: Swimming

Árni Sigurðsson (born 22 May 1965) is an Icelandic breaststroke swimmer. He competed in two events at the 1984 Summer Olympics.
