= Jón Sigurðsson (disambiguation) =

Jón Sigurðsson may refer to:

- Jón Sigurðsson (1811–1879), the leader of the 19th-century Icelandic independence movement
- Jón Sigurðsson (politician, born 1941), an Icelandic politician and former minister
- Jón Sigurðsson (politician, born 1946) (1946–2021), an Icelandic politician and minister
- Jón Sigurðsson (basketball) (born 1951), an Icelandic former basketball player and coach
- Jón Karl Sigurðsson (born 1932), an Icelandic Olympic skier
