= ÍR (men's football) =

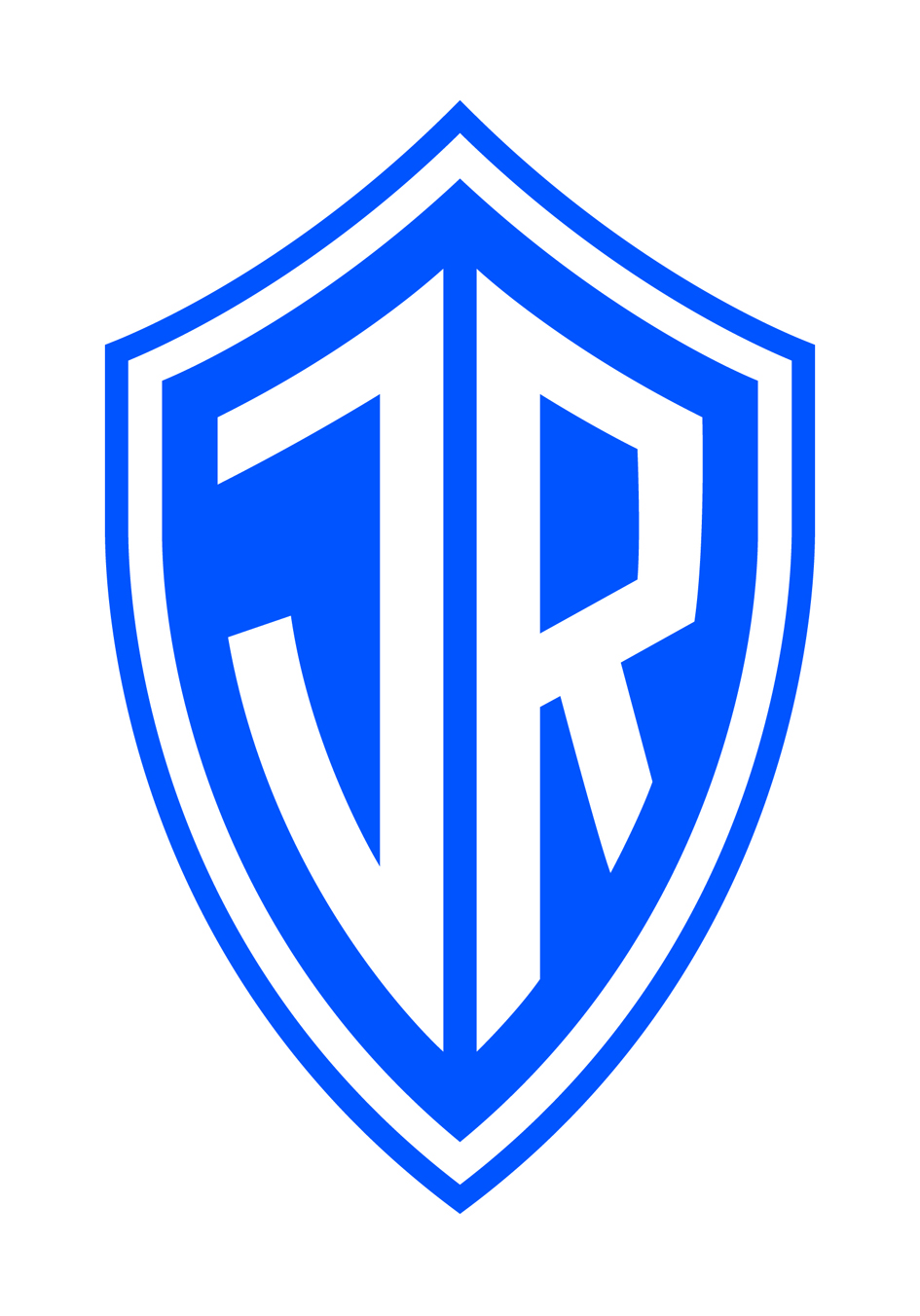
- Full name: Íþróttafélag Reykjavíkur
- Short name: ÍR
- Founded: 7 March 1907; 119 years ago
- Ground: AutoCenter-völlurinn, Reykjavík, Iceland
- Capacity: 1,200
- Club Chairman: Vigfús Þorsteinsson
- Football Chairman: Axel Kári Vignisson
- Manager: Jóhann Birnir Guðmundsson and Árni Freyr Guðnason
- League: 1. deild karla
- 2025: 1. deild karla, 6th of 12
Home colours	Away colours

The ÍR men's football team, commonly known as ÍR is the men's football department of Íþróttafélag Reykjavíkur. It is based in Reykjavík, Iceland and currently plays in 1. deild karla.

== History ==
Although football was one of the first sports practiced at Íþróttafélag Reykjavíkur, it's football department was not formally founded until 7 March 1939. In 1943, Guðmundur S. Hofdal, the former trainer of the Olympic gold-winners Winnipeg Falcons, was hired as a coach. In 1944 it fielded a senior team in the national tournament for the first time. After losing the first game 0–8 to Fram, the team withdrew from the tournament. It played in the top-tier Úrvalsdeild karla in 1998 when it was relegated after the last game of the season.

== Honours ==
=== Titles ===
- 1. deild karla:
  - Runner-ups: 1997
- 2. deild karla:
  - Winners: 2008, 2016
  - Runner-ups: 1998, 2023
- 3. deild karla: 1985
  - Winners: 1985

=== Awards ===
- Úrvalsdeild Young Player of the Year:
  - (Iceland) Ólafur Þór Gunnarsson: 1998

== Current squad ==
As of 10 August 2026

Note: Flags indicate national team as defined under FIFA eligibility rules; some limited exceptions apply. Players may hold more than one non-FIFA nationality.

No.	Pos.	Nation	Player
1	GK	ISL	Vilhelm Þhráinn Sigurjónsson
2	MF	GUA	André Solórzano
3	MF	ISL	Halldór Kristjánsson
4	DF	ISL	Sigurður Karl Gunnarsson
5	DF	ISL	Hrafn Hallgrímsson
6	MF	ISL	Kristján Atli Marteinsson
7	FW	ISL	Ívan Óli Santos
8	MF	ISL	Emil Nói Sigurhjartarsson
9	FW	ISL	Bergvin Fannar Helgason
10	MF	ISL	Stefán Þór Pálsson
11	FW	ISL	Guðjón Máni Magnússon
14	FW	ISL	Víðir Freyr Ívarsson

No.	Pos.	Nation	Player
17	MF	ISL	Óliver Andri Einarsson
18	FW	ISL	Þorri Heiðar Bergmann (on loan from ÍBV U19)
19	MF	ISL	Hákon Matthíasson
22	DF	ISL	Jónþór Atli Ingólfsson
23	DF	ISL	Ágúst Unnar Kristinsson
25	DF	ISL	Jón Arnar Sigurðsson
27	GK	ISL	Jóhannes Kristinn Hlynsson
28	DF	ISL	Óliver Elis Hlynsson (on loan from Fram)
33	FW	ISL	Ísak Atli Atlason (on loan from FH)
44	MF	ISL	Arnór Sölvi Hardarson
46	MF	YEM	Tareq Shihab
61	MF	ISL	Orri Bjarkason (on loan from Breiðablik)

=== Out on loan ===
Note: Flags indicate national team as defined under FIFA eligibility rules; some limited exceptions apply. Players may hold more than one non-FIFA nationality.

No.	Pos.	Nation	Player
15	MF	ISL	Mikael Trausti Viðarsson (at Fjölnir until 5 February 2027)
