= Steinar Þór Guðgeirsson =

Icelandic footballer

Personal information
- Date of birth: 19 August 1971 (age 55)
- Position: Midfielder

Senior career*
Years	Team	Apps	(Gls)
1989–1992	Fram		
1992–1993	KFC Heultje		
1993–1997	Fram		
1998	ÍB Vestmannaeyja		
1999–2000	Fram		

International career
1991	Iceland	1	(0)

Managerial career
- 2013: Fram
- * Club domestic league appearances and goals

Steinar Þór Guðgeirsson (born 19 August 1971) is a retired Icelandic football midfielder.
