= Laugaskóli =

Icelandic boarding school

Coordinates: 65.722°N 17.358°W

Laugar Junior College (Icelandic: Framhaldsskólinn á Laugum or Laugaskóli) is an Icelandic boarding school, founded in 1925. It is located in the north of Iceland, near the towns of Húsavík and Akureyri.
