= Jón Pétursson =

Jón Pétursson can refer to:

- Jón Pétursson (athlete) (1936-2003), Icelandic Olympic athlete
- Jón Pétursson (sailor) (born 1967), Icelandic Olympic sailor
