= Mount Baldr =

Mountain in Nunavut, Canada

- Location within Nunavut

Highest point
- Elevation: 1,720 m (5,640 ft)
- Prominence: 426 m (1,398 ft)
- Coordinates: 66°33′00″N 65°13′59″W

Geography
- Location: Baffin Island, Nunavut, Canada
- Parent range: Baffin Mountains
- Topo map: NTS 26I11 Mount Asgard

Mount Baldr is a mountain on Baffin Island, located 49 km (30 mi) northeast of Pangnirtung, Nunavut, Canada. It lies in the southern Baffin Mountains, which in turn form part of the Arctic Cordillera mountain system. Like nearby Breidablik Peak and Mount Odin and other peaks in the Arctic Cordillera, its name comes from Norse mythology. It is named after Baldr, a god in Germanic paganism and is Odin's second son.
