= Heimir Einarsson =

Icelandic footballer

Personal information
- Full name: Heimir Einarsson
- Date of birth: 20 April 1987 (age 39)
- Place of birth: Iceland
- Position: Defender

Senior career*
Years	Team	Apps	(Gls)
2006–2011	ÍA	97	(2)

International career^{‡}
2003–2004	Iceland U-17	7	(0)
2005	Iceland U-19	6	(0)
2007–2008	Iceland U-21	7	(0)
2008	Iceland	1	(0)
- * Club domestic league appearances and goals as of 22 October 2011 ‡ National team caps and goals as of 1 April 2010

Heimir Einarsson (born 20 April 1987) is a retired Icelandic football player who played for Icelandic football club ÍA.
