= Baldur Hermans =

German historian

- Born: 1938
- Died: 16 November 2015 (aged 76–77)
- Known for: Secretary-General of the International Catholic Conference of Scouting
- Awards: 264th Bronze Wolf
- Scientific career
- Fields: History, Catholic theology

Dr. Baldur Hendrik Hermans (Essen-Borbeck 1938 - 16 November 2015) was a German historian and a Catholic theologian. He was Secretary General of the International Catholic Conference of Scouting, and served as the International Commissioner of the Ring deutscher Pfadfinderverbände, as well as the International Commissioner of the German Catholic Scouting Deutsche Pfadfinderschaft Sankt Georg (DPSG).

Hermans began his university studies in Bonn Rheinische Friedrich-Wilhelms-Universität in 1961, and subsequently obtained a doctorate in history. He joined the UNITAS Catholic Students Association at the beginning of his studies. In 1970 he became director of the Episcopal Youth Office in the diocese of Essen, in 1989 he was head of the social functions and international relations department of the diocese, retiring in 2004.

A member of DPSG since 1949, between 1985 and 2004 he was the international commissioner, representing the association in Europe and around the world. He played an important role in the revival of Catholic Scouting in the countries of Eastern Europe and the former Soviet Union after 1989, by organizing international exchanges of young people and launching various international projects.

In 2002, at the Thessaloniki World Scout Conference, Hermans was elected Secretary General of the International Catholic Conference of Scouting, and reconfirmed in his post in 2005 in Tunis and in 2008 in Rome.

He was a member of the Pontifical Council for the Laity, the Lumen Gentium Foundation and the Central Committee of German Catholics for Evangelization. He collaborated for many years in the political work of the Christian Democratic Union of Germany (CDU), and was author and publisher of numerous articles and books.

In March 1998, Hermans was awarded the 264th Bronze Wolf, the only distinction of the World Organization of the Scout Movement, awarded by the World Scout Committee for exceptional services to world Scouting. In 2009, he became a member of the Order of Merit of the Federal Republic of Germany.
