= Jón Ólafsson =

Jón Ólafsson may refer to:

- Jón Ólafsson of Grunnavík (1705–1779), Icelandic scholar
- Jón Ólafsson (journalist) (1850–1916), Icelandic editor, journalist, and poet
- Jón Ólafsson (traveller) (c. 1594–1679), Icelandic traveller to the East Indies
- Jón Axel Ólafsson, Icelandic radio personality, producer and manager
- Jón Þór Ólafsson (born 1977), Icelandic politician
- Jón Ólafsson (athlete) (born 1941), Icelandic Olympic athlete
