= Guðmundur Hreiðarsson =

Icelandic footballer

Personal information
- Full name: Guðmundur Sævar Hreiðarsson
- Date of birth: 5 October 1960 (age 66)
- Height: 1.87 m (6 ft 2 in)
- Position: Goalkeeper

Senior career*
Years	Team	Apps	(Gls)
1979–1981	Haukar		
1982–1983	Valur		
1984	FH		
1985–1987	Valur		
1988–1989	Víkingur		
1989–1990	TuRU Düsseldorf		
1990–1993	Víkingur		
1994–1995	Breiðablik		
1996–1998	KR		

International career
1988	Iceland	1	(0)

Managerial career
- 2000: Iceland (women)
- 2008–2014: KR (goalkeeping coach)
- 2015: ÍA (goalkeeping coach)
- Iceland (goalkeeping coach)
- 2024–: Republic of Ireland (goalkeeping coach)
- * Club domestic league appearances and goals

Guðmundur Sævar Hreiðarsson (born 5 October 1960) is a retired Icelandic football goalkeeper and later manager. He is currently the goalkeeping coach of the Republic of Ireland
