= Jón Halldórsson (disambiguation) =

Jón Halldórsson (c. 1275 - 1339) was a Roman Catholic clergyman who became bishop of Iceland.

Jón Halldórsson may also refer to:

- Jón Halldórsson (athlete, born 1889)
- Jón Halldórsson (athlete, born 1982)
