= Gunnar Leósson =

Icelandic footballer

Personal information
- Date of birth: 12 February 1936
- Date of death: 30 July 1965 (aged 29)

International career
Years	Team	Apps	(Gls)
1957	Iceland	1	(0)

Gunnar Leósson (12 February 1936 – 30 July 1965) was an Icelandic footballer. He played in one match for the Iceland national football team in 1957.
