= Jón Thoroddsen =

Jón Thoroddsen may refer to:

- Jón Thoroddsen elder (c. 1818–1868)
- Jón Thoroddsen junior (1898–1924)
