= Jón Helgason =

Jón Helgason may refer to:

- Jón Helgason (bishop) (166–1942), Icelandic Lutheran bishop
- Jón Helgason (poet) (1899–1986), Icelandic philologist and poet
- Jón Helgason (minister) (1931–2019), Icelandic politician and former minister
