= Jón Gunnlaugsson =

Icelandic footballer

Personal information
- Date of birth: 19 December 1949 (age 76)
- Place of birth: Iceland
- Position: Defender

International career
Years	Team	Apps	(Gls)
1974–1977	Iceland	5	(0)

Jón Gunnlaugsson (born 19 December 1949) is an Icelandic former footballer who played the position of defender. He was part of the Iceland national team between 1974 and 1977, playing five matches.

== See also ==
- List of Iceland international footballers
