= Baldur (disambiguation) =

Baldr, Baldur or Balder is a Norse god.

Baldur may also refer to:

== Arts and media ==
- Baldur (album), by Icelandic band Skálmöld
- Baldurs draumar (Baldur's Dreams), ballet by Norwegian composer Geirr Tveitt
- Baldur Blauzahn, German comedy television series on WDR
- Baldur's Gate (city), fictional city in the Forgotten Realms role-playing game
- Baldur's Gate series, a series of computer role-playing games

== Other ==
- Baldur, Manitoba, an unincorporated community
- Baldur (given name)
- ICGV Baldur (II), a naval trawler of the Icelandic Coast Guard

== See also ==
- Balder (disambiguation)
