= Þorsteinn Sæmundsson =

Icelandic astronomer (born 1935)

Þorsteinn Sæmundsson (born 1935) was an Icelandic astronomer. He has served as head of the Faculty of Applied Sciences at the University of Iceland from 1967 to 2005, and has been a member of the Royal Observatory, Greenwich since 1952, and member of the Royal Astronomical Society since 1962.
