= Valdimar Kristófersson =

Icelandic footballer (born 1970)

Personal information
- Full name: Valdimar Tryggvi Kristófersson
- Date of birth: 22 March 1970 (age 56)
- Position: Forward

Senior career*
Years	Team	Apps	(Gls)
1986–1991	Stjarnan		
1992	Fram		
1992–1993	KFC Heultje		
1993	Fram		
1994–1996	Stjarnan		
1996–1997	SV Wilhelmshaven		
1997–2006	Stjarnan		

International career
1991–1992	Iceland	2	(0)
- * Club domestic league appearances and goals

Valdimar Kristófersson (born 22 March 1970) is an Icelandic former professional footballer who played as a forward.
