= Valur Valsson =

Icelandic footballer

Personal information
- Full name: Valur Einar Valsson
- Date of birth: 24 December 1961 (age 64)
- Height: 1.74 m (5 ft 9 in)
- Position: Midfielder

Senior career*
Years	Team	Apps	(Gls)
1978–1980	FH		
1981–1988	Valur		
1990–1994	Breiðablik	53	(5)
1995	Valur	11	(2)

International career
1982–1983	Iceland U21	3	(0)
1984–1992	Iceland	14	(0)
- * Club domestic league appearances and goals

Valur Einar Valsson (born 24 December 1961) is a retired Icelandic football midfielder.
