= Heimir Guðjónsson (footballer, born 1937) =

Icelandic footballer

Personal information
- Date of birth: 13 June 1937 (age 89)
- Place of birth: Kingdom of Iceland
- Position: Goalkeeper

Senior career*
| Years | Team | Apps | (Gls) |
- KR

International career
| 1960–1965 | Iceland | 6 | (0) |
- * Club domestic league appearances and goals

Heimir Guðjónsson (born 13 June 1937) is an Icelandic former footballer. He played the position of goalkeeper and played for the Icelandic men's national football team from 1960 to 1965.

== See also ==
- List of Iceland international footballers
