= Þorsteinn Erlingsson =

Icelandic poet (1858–1914)

Þorsteinn Erlingsson (1858–1914) was an Icelandic poet. He graduated from Menntaskólinn í Reykjavík in 1883 and went to Copenhagen to study law. He never finished law school but during his time in Copenhagen his poems became known in Iceland. He returned to his home country in 1895 and died of pneumonia in Reykjavík in 1914.

Þorsteinn was an atheist and a socialist. While much of his poetry attacked the ruling classes and the church he also composed popular ditties and poems on nature reminiscent of romanticism. Sometimes, as in his poem Sólskríkjan, the two themes are intertwined. Other well-known poems include:

- Arfurinn - an attack on Iceland's Danish oppressors.
- Í Hlíðarendakoti - fond memories of a childhood home
- Rask - in memory of Rasmus Christian Rask
- Snati og Óli - a ditty on a boy and his dog
- Þið munið hann Jörund - An extremely sarcastic take on the coup in 1809.
- Við fossinn - Another sarcastic poem, directed against industrialization.
- Örlög guðanna - a lament for the pagan gods

Þorsteinn's volume of poetry, Þyrnar ("Thorns"), was first published in 1897 although many of the poems had been published before individually.
