= Kristján Jónsson (footballer) =

Icelandic footballer

Personal information
- Date of birth: 29 October 1963 (age 63)
- Position: Defender

Senior career*
Years	Team	Apps	(Gls)
1980–1986	Þróttur		
1987–1993	Fram		
1994	Bodø/Glimt	12	(1)
1995	Fram		
1996–1997	Elfsborg		
1998–2000	Þróttur		

International career
1984–1995	Iceland	39	(0)
- * Club domestic league appearances and goals

Kristján Jónsson (born 29 October 1963) is a retired Icelandic football defender.
