= Aðalsteinn Aðalsteinsson =

Icelandic footballer

Personal information
- Full name: Aðalsteinn Aðalsteinsson
- Date of birth: 25 April 1962 (age 64)
- Place of birth: Iceland
- Height: 1.82 m (6 ft 0 in)
- Position: Midfielder

Senior career*
Years	Team	Apps	(Gls)
1979–1985	Víkingur Reykjavík	72	(10)
1986	Djerv Haugesund	30	(1)
1987–1988	Völsungur	22	(3)
1989–1990	Víkingur Reykjavík	31	(0)
1991	Leiftur	17	(1)
1992	Víkingur Reykjavík	17	(2)
1993–1994	Völsungur		
1995–1996	Víkingur Reykjavík	13	(0)
1997	Sindri	13	(0)

International career
1982–1983	Iceland U21	5	(0)
1982–1990	Iceland	4	(0)

Managerial career
- 1996: Víkingur Reykjavík
- 2016: Skallagrímur
- 2019: Fram
- 2019: Úlfarnir
- 2020-2023: Fram
- * Club domestic league appearances and goals

Aðalsteinn Aðalsteinsson (born 25 April 1962) is an Icelandic retired footballer. He played as a midfielder, and later became a football manager. He coached teams that won over 40 titles in major official tournaments in Iceland.

== Career ==
=== Player ===
He twice won the biggest trophy in Iceland, the Icelandic Championship, with his mother club Vikingur from Reykjavik, in 1981 and 1982. He won two trophys as Champions of Champions in 1982 and 1983. He was awarded best player in Iceland by the newspaper Morgunblaðið in 1990. The same year he was awarded best player in Víkingur FC by the club.

In the covid period 2022 he was selected by Vikingur fans to be in the best starting line up of 11 players since 1908 against the Vikingur line up team 2022. He is still as one of top ten capped players in top league for Vikingur Reykjavik.

=== International career ===
Aðalsteinn made his debut for Iceland in an August 1982 friendly match away against the Faroe Islands and earned a total of 4 caps, scoring no goals. All his international matches were against the Faroese, the first three unofficial; his fourth and final international was an August 1990 friendly against them. He was selected in the first U21 Iceland national team that participated in the Euro. The games were against Holland and Spain.

Aðalsteinn played 6 games in Europa Cup against Real Sociedad, Bordeaux and Raba Eto. He played two games in the Champions League against CSKA Moscow.

=== Coach ===
He was elected coach of the year in 1992 in Vikingur as a youth coach and got the same award for Fylkir football club in 2008 which he coached at for ten years.

Aðalsteinn was nominated coach of the year by the youth coaching Federation in Iceland in 2004 for his passion and huge work load for 25 years of coaching youth teams.

In 2016 he got a Uefa A coaching license and in 2022 he got a UEFA A youth elite coaching license.

He coached Fram first team as assistant manager from 2020 to 2023. Fram won the first division in 2021 without losing a single game, setting a record of points in first division.

He got a Gold medal of honour from the Icelandic Football Association in 2023 for his work and efforts for the football in Iceland.

In 2019 he coached at the same time Ulfarnir, a sub-team of Fram in Iceland's lowest division. The team reached 32 finals and beat first division team Vikingur from Ólafsvík, away by 2-6 victory.

He got an award from Fram football club in 2023 after coaching at Fram for 14 years.
