= Ólafur Þór Gunnarsson =

Icelandic footballer

Personal information
- Date of birth: 25 October 1977 (age 49)
- Place of birth: Iceland
- Height: 1.89 m (6 ft 2 in)
- Position: Goalkeeper

College career
Years	Team	Apps	(Gls)
1996–1999	Flagler College		

Senior career*
Years	Team	Apps	(Gls)
1994–1998	ÍR	79	(1)
1999–2002	ÍA	71	(0)
2003–2004	Valur	21	(0)
2005–2007	FH	0	(0)
2006–2007	→ Þróttur Reykjavík (loan)	36	(0)
2008	ÍR	2	(0)
2009	Fylkir	8	(0)
2011	Þróttur Reykjavík	4	(0)
2012	Valur	4	(0)
Total		225	(1)

International career
1994–1996	Iceland U19	10	(0)
1998–1999	Iceland U21	6	(0)
2002	Iceland	1	(0)
- * Club domestic league appearances and goals

Ólafur Þór Gunnarsson (born 25 October 1977) is an Icelandic former footballer. He played the majority of his career in Iceland and capped for the Icelandic national team against Brazil in 2002. He played football for Flagler College in the United States, where he was a three-time NAIA All-American, All-Region XIV and All-Florida Sun Conference selection. In 2016, he was inducted into the schools hall of fame.

== Playing career ==
Ólafur started his senior team career with ÍR in 1994. In end of December 1997, he went on a tryout with Sheffield Wednesday. After a breakout season in 1998, he transferred to ÍA prior to the 1999 season. In his first league game with ÍA, he conceded a goal after only 17-seconds. After four seasons with ÍA, he transferred to Valur in 2003. During the 2004 season, he suffered an anterior cruciate ligament injury.

In 2005, he joined FH but spent most of the season as the substitute goalkeeper, only appeared in one game in the Icelandic Cup. In February 2006, he went on a trial with the Atlanta Silverbacks. He played the 2006 and 2007 seasons on a loan to Þróttur Reykjavík. During the 2007, he helped the team gain promotion to the top-tier Úrvalsdeild karla.

In March 2008, Ólafur announced his retirement from football due to a shoulder injury but in July, he returned to the court and joined ÍR due to an injury to the main goalkeeper of the team, Þorsteinn V. Einarsson. After two games for ÍR, he signed back with Þróttur as a backup goalkeeper.

On 29 July 2009, Ólafur signed with Fylkir after their main goalkeeper, Fjalar Þorgeirsson, broke his arm and appeared in Fylkirs last nine league and cup matches. After sitting out the 2010 season, he signed with Þróttur Reykjavík in July 2011.

On 12 July 2012, Ólafur signed a short-term contract with Valur due to an injury to Sindri Snær Jensson.
