= Atli Eðvaldsson =

Icelandic footballer (1957–2019)

Personal information
- Full name: Atli Eðvaldsson
- Date of birth: 3 March 1957
- Place of birth: Reykjavík, Iceland
- Date of death: 2 September 2019 (aged 62)
- Place of death: Reykjavík, Iceland
- Height: 6 ft 2 in (1.88 m)
- Position: Midfielder

Senior career*
Years	Team	Apps	(Gls)
1974–1980	Valur	93	(31)
1980–1981	Borussia Dortmund	30	(11)
1981–1985	Fortuna Düsseldorf	122	(38)
1985–1988	Bayer 05 Uerdingen	72	(10)
1988–1989	TuRU Düsseldorf	23	(6)
1989–1990	Gençlerbirliği	23	(4)
1990–1993	KR Reykjavík	48	(16)
1994	HK Kópavogur	11	(1)
Total		422	(117)

International career
1974	Iceland U19	2	(0)
1978	Iceland U21	1	(0)
1976–1991	Iceland	70	(8)

Managerial career
- 1995–1996: ÍBV
- 1997: Fylkir
- 1998–1999: KR Reykjavík
- 1999–2003: Iceland
- 2005–2006: Þróttur Reykjavík
- 2009: Valur
- 2013: Reynir Sandgerði
- 2014: Afturelding
- 2017–2018: Kristianstad FC
- 2018: Hamar
- * Club domestic league appearances and goals

Atli Eðvaldsson (3 March 1957 – 2 September 2019) was an Icelandic professional footballer who played as a midfielder, widely regarded as one of the most influential players to come from Iceland. During his career, he won the Icelandic championship three times and the Icelandic Cup four times. After retiring from playing, he became a well-known manager. In 1999, he guided Knattspyrnufélag Reykjavíkur to its first championship in 31 years. Atli played 70 games for the Icelandic national team from 1976 to 1991. He later coached the national team from 1999 to 2003.

== Club career ==
Atli started at Valur and later became very successful in the German Bundesliga with Fortuna Düsseldorf and Bayer Uerdingen. On 6 June 1983, he became the first foreign player to score a five goals in one game in the Bundesliga, when he scored five goals for Fortuna Düsseldorf in a 5–1 victory against Eintracht Frankfurt. Straight after the game, he and teammate Pétur Ormslev, where flown to Iceland where Atli scored the winning goal in Iceland's 1–0 victory against Malta the following day. For the season, he scored 21 goals in 34 matches for Düsseldorf, finishing second in the league.

After a year in Turkey, he finished his playing career back in Iceland, where he became player-manager.

== International career ==
He made his debut for Iceland in 1976 and went on to win 70 caps, scoring eight goals and captaining the team 31 times. He played his last international match in a September 1991 friendly game against Denmark. After Ásgeir Elíasson became Iceland's manager in 1991, he announced that Atli was not in the future plans of the team. At the time he was Iceland's record cap.

== Managerial career ==
After his playing days ended, Atli went on to manage three Icelandic club teams before taking the helm at the national team in 1999 where he stayed for four years. On 4 July 2009, Atli was appointed manager of Úrvalsdeild karla club Valur until the end of the season.

He last coached Hamar in the 4. deild karla in 2018.

== Roger Hollis case ==
Chapman Pincher alleged that Atli was the owner of certain documents that might add further weight to the case against Roger Hollis, that Hollis was a Russian spy at the head of MI-5 in the UK. As Pincher, who died in 2014, stated "I have been unable to extract a copy of the interrogation report from Atli", p. 603. The interrogation report was alleged by Pincher to have been written by his deceased father, Evald Mikson.

== Personal life ==
Atli was the younger brother of former international player Jóhannes Eðvaldsson. His father, Evald Mikson (Icelandic: Eðvald Hinriksson), was a goalkeeper in the Estonian national football team between 1934 and 1938. Evald was the Tallinn chief of police during the German occupation of Estonia during World War II.

Atli's daughter Sif Atladóttir is a member of the women's national football team.

== Illness and death ==
In December 2018, he revealed in an interview with RÚV that he had been battling a serious illness for two years and that initially the doctors only gave him two weeks to live. On 2 September 2019, Atli died from cancer.
