= Sævar Þór Gíslason =

Icelandic footballer

Personal information
- Date of birth: 26 December 1975 (age 50)
- Position: Forward

Senior career*
Years	Team	Apps	(Gls)
–1997	UMF Selfoss		
1998–2000	ÍR	35	(17)
2000–2006	Fylkir	99	(41)
2007–2011	UMF Selfoss	96	(61)

International career
2001–2002	Iceland	7	(0)
- * Club domestic league appearances and goals

Sævar Þór Gíslason (born 26 December 1975) is a retired Icelandic football striker who played 7 matches for the Icelandic national team.
