= Atli Þór Héðinsson =

Icelandic footballer

Personal information
- Full name: Atli Þór Héðinsson
- Date of birth: 23 September 1953 (age 73)
- Place of birth: Iceland
- Position: Forward

Senior career*
Years	Team	Apps	(Gls)
1971–1974	KR	51	(16)
1974–1975	Greenock Morton	2	(0)
1975	KR	13	(5)
1976–1977	Holbæk	32	(7)
1978–1980	Herfølge	?	(?)
1980	Holbæk	?	(?)
1981	KR	12	(0)

International career
1970	Iceland U19	1	(0)
1974	Iceland	2	(0)
- * Club domestic league appearances and goals

Atli Þór Héðinsson (born 23 September 1953) is an Icelandic former footballer who played as a forward. He won two caps for the Iceland national football team in 1974.

Atli made his international debut in the 2–2 draw with Finland on 19 August 1974. He played his second and final match for Iceland almost two months later, in the 1–1 draw away at East Germany.
