= Jón Bjarki Magnússon =

Icelandic journalist and documentary filmmaker

Jón Bjarki Magnússon (born 30 June 1984) is an Icelandic journalist and independent documentary filmmaker. He studied creative writing at the University of Iceland (2012) and received his MA in Visual and Media Anthropology from Freie Universität, Berlin (2018).

== Biography ==
Magnússon's journalistic work includes award-winning coverage of the conditions of refugees and asylum seekers in his home country and the leaked memo case, which led to the resignation of then-Minister of the Interior Hanna Birna Kristjánsdóttir.

His short film, Even Asteroids Are Not Alone (2018), was awarded the Royal Anthropological Institute's (RAI) Short Film Prize for ‘the most outstanding short film on social, cultural and biological anthropology or archaeology’ in 2019. His first feature documentary, Half Elf (2020), won the Grand Jury Prize at Skjaldborg, Icelandic Documentary Film Festival in 2020, and has been nominated for several prizes at key European film festivals.

He is the founder of SKAK bíófilm, a small Icelandic production company specialising in the creation of anthropological and artistic films. He is a regular contributor to the Icelandic bi-weekly newspaper Stundin and works on project development for Filmmaking For Fieldwork (F4F™), an educational project that offers training in audio-visual research methods, ethnographic and documentary filmmaking.
