= Ársæll Kjartansson =

Icelandic footballer

Personal information
- Full name: Ársæll Örn Kjartansson
- Date of birth: 6 October 1945 (age 81)
- Place of birth: Iceland
- Position: Defender

Senior career*
Years	Team	Apps	(Gls)
- KR

International career
1966–1968	Iceland	3	(0)
- * Club domestic league appearances and goals

Ársæll Örn Kjartansson (born 6 October 1945) is an Icelandic former footballer who played as a defender. He won three caps for the Iceland national football team between 1966 and 1968.
