= Björn Thorsteinsson =

Icelandic chess player (born 1940)

Personal information
- Born: 7 January 1940 (age 86)

Chess career
- Country: Iceland

Björn Thorsteinsson (born 7 January 1940), Icelandic Björn Þorsteinsson, is an Icelandic chess player, and two times Icelandic Chess Championship winner (1967, 1975).

== Biography ==
From the early 1960s to the mid-1970s Björn Thorsteinsson was one of the leading Icelandic chess players. He twice won Icelandic Chess Championships: in 1967 and 1975.

Björn Thorsteinsson played for Iceland in the Chess Olympiads:

- In 1962, at fourth board in the 15th Chess Olympiad in Varna (+4, =4, -4),
- In 1964, at first board in the 16th Chess Olympiad in Tel Aviv (+4, =6, -5),
- In 1968, at first reserve board in the 18th Chess Olympiad in Lugano (+2, =7, -3),
- In 1976, at third board in the 22nd Chess Olympiad in Haifa (+2, =5, -2).

Björn Thorsteinsson played for Iceland in the Nordic Chess Cups:

- In 1975, at second board in the 6th Nordic Chess Cup in Hindås (+0, =3, -2).
