= Jón Leósson =

Icelandic footballer

Personal information
- Date of birth: 23 February 1935
- Date of death: 12 May 2013 (aged 78)

International career
Years	Team	Apps	(Gls)
1957–1964	Iceland	7	(0)

Jón Leósson (23 February 1935 – 12 May 2013) was an Icelandic footballer. He played in seven matches for the Iceland national football team from 1957 to 1964.
