= Jóhannes Eðvaldsson =

Icelandic footballer (1950–2021)

Personal information
- Full name: Jóhannes Eðvaldsson
- Date of birth: 3 September 1950
- Place of birth: Reykjavík, Iceland
- Date of death: 24 January 2021 (aged 70)
- Place of death: Glasgow, Scotland
- Position: Centre-back

Senior career*
Years	Team	Apps	(Gls)
1968–1971	Valur	50	(15)
1972	Cape Town City	10	(2)
1972–1974	Valur	42	(13)
1974	Metz	0	(0)
1975	Holbæk B&I	12	(2)
1975–1980	Celtic	127	(24)
1980–1981	Tulsa Roughnecks	68	(17)
1981–1982	Hannover 96	21	(1)
1982–1984	Motherwell	55	(6)
1984–1985	Þróttur	33	(0)

International career
1971–1983	Iceland	34	(2)
- * Club domestic league appearances and goals

Jóhannes Eðvaldsson (3 September 1950 – 24 January 2021) was an Icelandic international football player. He won the Scottish league championship twice with Celtic F.C. and the Scottish Cup once.

== Playing career ==
Jóhannes started his career with Valur in his native land before short spells with Metz of France and Holbek of Denmark. He was signed by Sean Fallon in 1975, joining Scottish club Celtic after a short trial. He played in almost every outfield position while at Celtic but was most suited to central defence. He was nicknamed "Shuggy" by the fans. After making 188 appearances for the Glasgow club, during which he scored 36 goals, Johannes won 2 Premier Division titles and 1 Scottish Cup before he moved to the US in February 1980, joining NASL side Tulsa Roughnecks.

Jóhannes returned to Europe in 1981, joining German side Hannover 96. He later joined Motherwell in 1982 and played two seasons for the Fir Park side before retiring in 1984.

During his career he gained 34 caps for the Iceland national side, 16 of which were attained while with Celtic.

== Coaching career ==
Jóhannes started a coaching career with Þróttur in 1984 but soon returned to live in Scotland, where his wife is from. He suffered a brain haemorrhage in 1995 but made a full recovery. Jóhannes was a coach for a 1994 team at Jimmy Johnstone Academy.

== Personal life ==
Jóhannes' father Evald Mikson was an Estonian international goalkeeper in the 1930s, who was later Deputy Head of the Tallinn Police during the Nazi occupation. Accused of war crimes, Mikson fled Estonia at the end of World War II, eventually alighting in Iceland where he settled and raised a family, changing his name to the Icelandic Eðvald Hinriksson.

Jóhannes' brother Atli, seven years his junior, was also an international footballer. Atli was for a period Iceland's record cap holder, and played most of his career in Germany with Borussia Dortmund, Bayer Uerdingen and Fortuna Düsseldorf before moving into coaching. He managed the Icelandic national side between 2000 and 2003.

Jóhannes died in Glasgow in January 2021 from COVID-19. He was 70.
