= Atli Knútsson =

Icelandic footballer

Personal information
- Full name: Atli Knútsson
- Date of birth: 14 March 1975 (age 51)
- Place of birth: Iceland
- Position: Goalkeeper

Senior career*
Years	Team	Apps	(Gls)
1991–1995	KR	3	(0)
1996	Leiftur	4	(0)
1997–2001	Breiðablik	78	(0)
2002	Grindavík	6	(0)
2003–2004	Deiglan	3	(0)
2005	Stjarnan	11	(0)

International career
1992	Iceland U19	5	(0)
1994	Iceland U21	6	(0)
2002	Iceland	1	(0)
- * Club domestic league appearances and goals

Atli Knútsson (born 14 March 1975) is an Icelandic former footballer who played as a goalkeeper. He won his only senior cap for the Iceland national football team on 10 January 2002, coming on as a half-time substitute for Árni Gautur Arason in the 0–1 defeat to Saudi Arabia.
