= Árni Sveinsson =

Icelandic footballer

Personal information
- Full name: Árni Sveinsson
- Date of birth: 12 February 1956 (age 70)
- Place of birth: Iceland
- Position: Midfielder

Senior career*
Years	Team	Apps	(Gls)
1973–1986	ÍA	199	(28)
1978–1979	→ Excelsior (loan)	4	(2)
1987–1990	Stjarnan	64	(42)
1990–1991	Aris Bonnevoie	3	(0)
1991	Dalvík	18	(8)
1992	Stjarnan	15	(2)

International career
1973–1974	Iceland U19	7	(3)
1975–1985	Iceland	50	(4)
- * Club domestic league appearances and goals

Árni Sveinsson (born 12 February 1956) is an Icelandic former footballer who played as a midfielder. He won 50 caps for the Iceland national football team between 1975 and 1985.

Árni began his career with ÍA and made his senior debut during the 1973 season. He went on to play 199 league matches for the club, scoring 28 goals. During the winter of 1978–79, he had a spell with Dutch Eerste Divisie side Excelsior Rotterdam, where he scored twice in four appearances. In 1987, Árni joined 3. deild club Stjarnan, where was a part of the team that won successive promotions in 1988 and 1989. In total, he played 64 league matches for Stjarnan and scored 42 goals. Árni played three games for Aris Bonnevoie in Luxembourg in the 1990–91 season, before signing with Dalvík upon his return to Iceland. After a year with Dalvík, he returned to Stjarnan for one season before retiring from football in 1992.

As a youth, Árni won seven caps for the Iceland national under-19 football team. He made scored his first international goal in the 5–3 win against Scotland U19 on 12 April 1974, and scored twice in a 5–1 win over Faroe Islands U19 later the same year. Árni won his first senior cap on 23 June 1975 as Iceland recorded a 6–0 victory over the Faroe Islands. He netted his first senior goal for Iceland in his second match, a 1–1 draw with Norway. Árni went on to make 50 appearances for his country over the following 10 seasons, scoring four goals. His final international cap came on 12 July 1985, as he played the full match in Iceland's 1–0 win over the Faroe Islands.
