= Árni Njálsson =

Icelandic footballer

Personal information
- Full name: Árni Njálsson
- Date of birth: 16 June 1936 (age 90)
- Place of birth: Iceland
- Position: Defender

Senior career*
Years	Team	Apps	(Gls)
1956–1967	Valur		

International career
1956–1967	Iceland	23	(0)
- * Club domestic league appearances and goals

Árni Njálsson (born 16 June 1936) is an Icelandic former footballer who played as a defender. He won 23 caps for the Iceland national football team between 1956 and 1967.
