= Kjartan Antonsson =

Icelandic footballer

Personal information
- Date of birth: 30 September 1976 (age 50)
- Height: 1.90 m (6 ft 3 in)
- Position: Midfielder

Senior career*
Years	Team	Apps	(Gls)
1993–1997	Breiðablik	36	(1)
1998–2002	ÍBV	60	(0)
2003	Fylkir	11	(0)
2004	Breiðablik	14	(0)
Total		121	(1)

International career
1992	Iceland U16	4	(2)
1993	Iceland U17	7	(2)
1993–1995	Iceland U19	21	(4)
2001	Iceland	1	(0)
- * Club domestic league appearances and goals

Kjartan Antonsson (born 30 September 1976) is an Icelandic businessman and former footballer who played as a midfielder.

Kjartan started his senior team career with Breiðablik before starring with ÍBV from 1998 to 2002. In 2004, he joined Breiðablik after spending the previous season with Fylkir.

He played in one match for the Iceland national team in 2001.

== Personal life ==
Anton is the son of former Iceland national team member Anton Bjarnason.
