= Atlı =

Atlı ([atˈɫɯ], literally "equestrian", "horseman" or "rider") is a Turkish surname and may refer to:

- Aşir Atlı (1881–1957), officer of the Ottoman and general of the Turkish Army
- İsmet Atlı (1931–2014), Turkish wrestler
- Mert Atlı (born 1993), Turkish racewalker
- Süleyman Atlı (born 1994), Turkish wrestler
- Atlı, Olur
