= Sævar Jónsson =

Icelandic footballer

Personal information
- Date of birth: 22 July 1958 (age 68)
- Place of birth: Iceland
- Position: Defender

Senior career*
Years	Team	Apps	(Gls)
1978–1981	Valur	69	(3)
1981–1985	Cercle Brugge	90	(5)
1985	Valur	18	(4)
1986	SK Brann	25	(4)
1987	Valur	18	(0)
1987–1988	FC Solothurn	?	(?)
1988–1993	Valur	96	(17)
Total		318	(33)

International career
1980–1992	Iceland	69	(1)
- * Club domestic league appearances and goals

Sævar Jónsson (born 22 July 1958) is an Icelandic former footballer, who played as a defender.

== Club career ==
Sævar started his career at Valur before moving abroad to play in Belgium. He returned to Iceland and played a year in Norway and Switzerland to finish his career again at Valur.

== International career ==
Sævar made his debut for Iceland in 1980 and went on to collect 69 caps, scoring 1 goal. He played his last international match in an August 1992 friendly match against Israel, coming on as a substitute for Guðni Bergsson.

== Career statistics ==
=== International ===
Appearances and goals by national team and year
National team	Year	Apps	Goals
Iceland	1980	1	0
Iceland	1981	5	0
Iceland	1982	6	0
Iceland	1983	4	0
Iceland	1984	3	0
Iceland	1985	7	1
Iceland	1986	6	0
Iceland	1987	7	0
Iceland	1988	9	0
Iceland	1989	4	0
Iceland	1990	6	0
Iceland	1991	8	0
Iceland	1992	3	0
Total		69	1

Scores and results list Iceland's goal tally first, score column indicates score after each Jónsson goal.

List of international goals scored by Sævar Jónsson
No.	Date	Venue	Opponent	Score	Result	Competition
1	10 July 1985	Keflavíkurvöllur, Keflavík, Iceland	Faroe Islands	9–0	9–0	Friendly
