= Þormóður Árni Egilsson =

Icelandic footballer

Personal information
- Date of birth: 10 August 1969 (age 57)
- Position: Defender

Senior career*
Years	Team	Apps	(Gls)
1987–2002	KR		
2006	Stjarnan	1	(0)

International career
1990–1994	Iceland	8	(0)
- * Club domestic league appearances and goals

Þormóður Árni Egilsson (born 10 August 1969) is a retired Icelandic football defender.
