= Þorsteinn Þorsteinsson (athlete) =

Icelandic runner (born 1947)

Þorsteinn Þorsteinsson (born 27 July 1947) is an Icelandic athlete. He competed in the 800m race in the 1972 Summer Olympics, coming 6th in Heat 4 in a time of 1:50.8. His personal best time was 1:50.1, recorded in 1967.
