= Þorsteinn Þorsteinsson (footballer) =

Icelandic footballer

Personal information
- Date of birth: 1964 (age 61–62)
- Place of birth: Iceland

International career
Years	Team	Apps	(Gls)
1982–1988	Iceland	9	(0)

Þorsteinn Þorsteinsson (born 1964) is an Icelandic former footballer who played as a defender. He was part of the Iceland national football team between 1982 and 1988.

Þorsteinn was a defender for Fram until 1990, playing in several national championship matches, after which he played for Víkingur in 1991–1992.

Internationally, Þorsteinn played seven matches for the Iceland national under-17 football team in 1979, six for the national under-19s in 1980, five for the under-21s in 1982–1985, and nine for the Iceland national football team in 1982–1988. In 1987 he played for the national Olympic team in a friendly against Bordeaux.

== See also ==
- List of Iceland international footballers
