= Baldur Bragason =

Icelandic former footballer

Personal information
- Full name: Baldur Bragason
- Date of birth: 29 May 1968 (age 58)
- Place of birth: Iceland
- Height: 1.83 m (6 ft 0 in)
- Position: Midfielder

Senior career*
Years	Team	Apps	(Gls)
1988–1993	Valur	71	(8)
1989–1990	→ TuS Paderborn-Neuhaus (loan)	0	(0)
1994–1998	Leiftur	63	(13)
1996–1997	→ Lyngby (loan)	?	(?)
1998	→ Panachaiki (loan)	13	(1)
1999–2000	ÍBV	28	(1)

International career
1992–1993	Iceland	5	(0)
- * Club domestic league appearances and goals

Baldur Bragason (born 29 May 1968) is an Icelandic former footballer who played as a midfielder. He won five caps for the Iceland national football team between 1992 and 1993, and had spells in Iceland, Germany, Greece and Denmark during his playing career.

Shortly after he had won a place in the national team Baldur was in a motorcycle accident that left doctors doubting whether he could play again, but Baldur overcame that. During his injury, in 1994, he switched to Leiftur from Valur.
