= Tómas Ingi Tómasson =

Icelandic footballer (born 1969)

Personal information
- Date of birth: 7 June 1969 (age 57)
- Place of birth: Vestmannaeyjar, Iceland
- Position: Striker

Senior career*
Years	Team	Apps	(Gls)
1986–1992	ÍBV		
1991	→ FC Berlin		
1993–1994	KR	34	(14)
1995–1996	Grindavík	15	(7)
1996–1997	Raufoss		
1998	Þróttur	18	(14)
1998–2001	AGF Aarhus	38	(5)
2000	→ ÍBV	6	(1)
2001–2002	ÍBV	29	(12)
2003	KFS Vestmannaeyjar	4	(1)

International career
1990–1992	Iceland	2	(0)

Managerial career
- 2010–2011: HK
- 2011: Víkingur (assistant)
- * Club domestic league appearances and goals

Tómas Ingi Tómasson (born 7 June 1969) is an Icelandic former football manager and player who played the striker position.

== Personal life ==
Following his retirement from football, Tómas had a failed hip surgery in 2015 which resulted in four further surgeries to fix the problem.
