= Baldur Ingimar Aðalsteinsson =

Icelandic footballer

Baldur Aðalsteinsson
Personal information
- Full name: Baldur Ingimar Aðalsteinsson
- Date of birth: 12 February 1980 (age 46)
- Place of birth: Iceland
- Height: 1.80 m (5 ft 11 in)
- Position: Midfielder

Senior career*
Years	Team	Apps	(Gls)
1996–1998	Völsungur		
1999–2003	ÍA Akranes	67	(5)
1999–2000	→ KFC Uerdingen 05 (Loan)	4	(0)
2004–2010	Valur	108	(14)
2011	Víkingur R.	17	(1)
2014–2018	KFG	10	(1)
2018	Völsungur	4	(1)
2021–2022	KFG	1	(0)

International career
2001	Iceland U-21	7	(2)
2002–2008	Iceland	8	(0)
- * Club domestic league appearances and goals

Baldur Ingimar Aðalsteinsson (born 12 February 1980) is an Icelandic retired footballer. He played several seasons in the Icelandic top-tier and was capped eight times for the Iceland national team.

Baldur started his career with Völsungur before moving to ÍA Akranes in 1999.

== International career ==
Baldur Ingi made his debut for Iceland in a January 2002 friendly match away against Saudi Arabia, coming on as a 78th-minute substitute for Helgi Sigurðsson, and earned a total of 8 caps (no goals). His final international was a March 2008 friendly against the Faroe Islands.
