= 2018 Algarve Cup squads =

Lists of the squads for the 2018 Algarve Cup

This article lists the squads for the 2018 Algarve Cup, the 25th edition of the Algarve Cup. The cup consisted of a series of friendly games, and was held in the Algarve region of Portugal from 28 February to 7 March 2018. The twelve national teams involved in the tournament registered a squad of 23 players.

The age listed for each player is as of 28 February 2018, the first day of the tournament. The numbers of caps and goals listed for each player do not include any matches played after the start of tournament. The club listed is the club for which the player last played a competitive match prior to the tournament. The nationality for each club reflects the national association (not the league) to which the club is affiliated. A flag is included for coaches that are of a different nationality than their own national team.

== Group A ==
=== Australia ===
Coach: Alen Stajcic

The squad was announced on 20 February 2018. Rachel Lowe replaced Emily Gielnik on 21 February 2018.

No.	Pos.	Player	Date of birth (age)	Caps	Goals	Club
1	GK	Lydia Williams	13 May 1988 (aged 29)	64	0	(Football Australia) Melbourne City
2	DF	Caitlin Cooper	12 February 1988 (aged 30)	8	1	(Football Australia) Sydney FC
3	DF	Hannah Brewer	16 April 1993 (aged 24)	0	0	(Football Australia) Newcastle Jets
4	DF	Clare Polkinghorne (Co-Captain)	1 February 1989 (aged 29)	98	7	(Football Australia) Brisbane Roar
5	DF	Laura Alleway	28 November 1989 (aged 28)	50	2	(Football Australia) Melbourne Victory
6	MF	Chloe Logarzo	22 December 1994 (aged 23)	19	1	(Football Australia) Sydney FC
7	DF	Steph Catley	26 January 1994 (aged 24)	63	2	(Football Australia) Melbourne City
8	MF	Elise Kellond-Knight	10 August 1990 (aged 27)	86	1	(German Football Association) Turbine Potsdam
9	MF	Emily Condon	1 September 1998 (aged 19)	0	0	(Football Australia) Adelaide United
10	MF	Emily van Egmond	12 July 1993 (aged 24)	68	15	(Football Australia) Newcastle Jets
11	FW	Lisa De Vanna (Co-Captain)	14 November 1984 (aged 33)	128	43	(Football Australia) Sydney FC
13	MF	Tameka Butt	16 June 1991 (aged 26)	61	9	(Football Australia) Brisbane Roar
14	DF	Alanna Kennedy	21 January 1995 (aged 23)	59	3	(Football Australia) Melbourne City
15	FW	Rachel Lowe	19 November 2000 (aged 17)	0	0	(Football Australia) Western Sydney Wanderers
16	FW	Hayley Raso	5 September 1994 (aged 23)	24	1	(Football Australia) Brisbane Roar
17	MF	Alex Chidiac	15 January 1999 (aged 19)	4	0	(Football Australia) Adelaide United
18	GK	Mackenzie Arnold	25 February 1994 (aged 24)	15	0	(Football Australia) Brisbane Roar
19	MF	Katrina Gorry	13 August 1992 (aged 25)	59	14	(Football Australia) Brisbane Roar
20	FW	Sam Kerr	10 September 1993 (aged 24)	57	19	(Football Australia) Perth Glory
21	DF	Ellie Carpenter	28 April 2000 (aged 17)	13	1	(Football Australia) Canberra United
22	FW	Larissa Crummer	10 January 1996 (aged 22)	15	2	(Football Australia) Melbourne City
23	FW	Michelle Heyman	4 July 1988 (aged 29)	55	20	(Football Australia) Canberra United

=== China ===
Coach: (Iceland) Sigurður Ragnar Eyjólfsson

The squad was announced on 14 February 2018.

No.	Pos.	Player	Date of birth (age)	Club
2	DF	Liu Shanshan	16 March 1992 (aged 25)	(Chinese Football Association) Beijing BG Phoenix
3	DF	Li Danyang	8 April 1990 (aged 27)	(Chinese Football Association) Dalian
4	DF	Xue Jiao	30 January 1993 (aged 25)	(Chinese Football Association) Dalian
5	DF	Wu Haiyan	26 February 1993 (aged 25)	(Chinese Football Association) Wuhan Jianghan University
7	MF	Wang Shuang	23 January 1995 (aged 23)	(Chinese Football Association) Wuhan Jianghan University
8	DF	Ma Jun	6 March 1989 (aged 28)	(Chinese Football Association) Jiangsu Suning
9	FW	Tang Jiali	16 March 1995 (aged 22)	(Chinese Football Association) Jiangsu Suning
11	FW	Wang Shanshan	27 January 1990 (aged 28)	(Chinese Football Association) Dalian
12	FW	Jin Kun	4 October 1999 (aged 18)	(Chinese Football Association) Jiangsu Suning
14	MF	Xu Yanlu	16 September 1991 (aged 26)	(Chinese Football Association) Jiangsu Suning
15	FW	Song Duan	2 August 1995 (aged 22)	(Chinese Football Association) Dalian
16	MF	Han Peng	20 December 1989 (aged 28)	(Chinese Football Association) Guangdong Huijun
17	MF	Li Ying	7 January 1993 (aged 25)	(Chinese Football Association) Guangdong Huijun
20	MF	Zhang Rui	17 January 1989 (aged 29)	(Chinese Football Association) Changchun Zhuoyue
21	MF	Xiao Yuyi	10 January 1996 (aged 22)	(Chinese Football Association) Shanghai RCB
22	GK	Lu Feifei	10 November 1995 (aged 22)	(Chinese Football Association) Jiangsu Suning
23	MF	Ren Guixin	19 December 1988 (aged 29)	(Chinese Football Association) Changchun Zhuoyue
24	MF	Liu Jing	28 April 1998 (aged 19)	Unattached
25	MF	Tan Ruyin	17 July 1994 (aged 23)	(Chinese Football Association) Guangdong Huijun
27	MF	Yan Jinjin	10 September 1996 (aged 21)	(Chinese Football Association) Shanghai Shenglin
28	GK	Peng Shimeng	12 May 1998 (aged 19)	(Chinese Football Association) Jiangsu Suning
29	GK	Wang Fei	22 March 1990 (aged 27)	(German Football Association) Bayern Munich
31	MF	Lyu Yueyun	13 November 1995 (aged 22)	(Chinese Football Association) Wuhan Jianghan University

=== Norway ===
Coach: (Sweden) Martin Sjögren

The majority of the squad was announced on 12 February 2018, with Sjögren announcing 19 players. Five more players were announced on 20 February 2018.

No.	Pos.	Player	Date of birth (age)	Caps	Goals	Club
1	GK	Ingrid Hjelmseth	10 April 1980 (aged 37)	118	0	(Norwegian Football Federation) Stabæk
2	DF	Ingrid Moe Wold	29 January 1990 (aged 28)	46	3	(Norwegian Football Federation) LSK Kvinner
3	DF	Maria Thorisdottir	5 June 1993 (aged 24)	21	1	(The Football Association) Chelsea
4	DF	Stine Reinås	15 July 1994 (aged 23)	7	1	(Norwegian Football Federation) Stabæk
6	DF	Maren Mjelde (Captain)	6 November 1989 (aged 28)	124	18	(The Football Association) Chelsea
7	FW	Elise Thorsnes	14 August 1988 (aged 29)	109	17	(United States Soccer Federation) Utah Royals
8	DF	Ina Gausdal	21 March 1991 (aged 26)	3	1	(Norwegian Football Federation) Kolbotn
9	FW	Isabell Herlovsen	23 June 1988 (aged 29)	115	52	(Norwegian Football Federation) Vålerenga
10	MF	Caroline Graham Hansen	18 February 1995 (aged 23)	55	19	(German Football Association) VfL Wolfsburg
11	MF	Ingrid Marie Spord	12 July 1994 (aged 23)	15	0	(Italian Football Federation) Fiorentina
12	GK	Cecilie Fiskerstrand	20 March 1996 (aged 21)	16	0	(Norwegian Football Federation) LSK Kvinner
13	MF	Guro Reiten	26 July 1994 (aged 23)	21	4	(Norwegian Football Federation) LSK Kvinner
16	DF	Kristine Bjørdal Leine	6 August 1996 (aged 21)	0	0	(Norwegian Football Federation) Røa
17	MF	Kristine Minde	8 August 1992 (aged 25)	84	9	(Swedish Football Association) Linköping
18	MF	Frida Maanum	16 July 1999 (aged 18)	8	0	(Swedish Football Association) Linköping
19	MF	Ingvild Isaksen	10 February 1989 (aged 29)	61	3	(Italian Football Federation) Juventus
20	FW	Emilie Haavi	16 June 1992 (aged 25)	67	15	(Norwegian Football Federation) LSK Kvinner
21	FW	Lisa-Marie Karlseng Utland	19 September 1992 (aged 25)	26	4	(Norwegian Football Federation) Røa
22	DF	Anja Sønstevold	21 June 1992 (aged 25)	12	0	(Norwegian Football Federation) LSK Kvinner
23	GK	Aurora Mikalsen	21 March 1996 (aged 21)	0	0	(Norwegian Football Federation) Kolbotn
25	FW	Synne Jensen	15 February 1996 (aged 22)	17	2	(Norwegian Football Federation) Stabæk
32	DF	Ingrid Ryland	29 May 1989 (aged 28)	21	0	(Swedish Football Association) Djurgården
33	MF	Ingrid Syrstad Engen	29 April 1998 (aged 19)	0	0	(Norwegian Football Federation) LSK Kvinner
34	MF	Vilde Bøe Risa	13 July 1995 (aged 22)	3	1	(Norwegian Football Federation) Arna-Bjørnar

=== Portugal ===
Coach: Francisco Neto

The squad was announced on 19 February 2018.

No.	Pos.	Player	Date of birth (age)	Caps	Goals	Club
1	GK	Inês Pereira	26 May 1999 (aged 18)	1	0	(Portuguese Football Federation) Sporting CP
2	DF	Mónica Mendes	16 June 1993 (aged 24)	38	1	(Italian Football Federation) Brescia
3	DF	Raquel Infante	19 September 1990 (aged 27)	17	0	(French Football Federation) Rodez
4	DF	Sílvia Rebelo	20 May 1989 (aged 28)	76	1	(Portuguese Football Federation) SC Braga
5	DF	Matilde Fidalgo	15 May 1994 (aged 23)	13	0	(Portuguese Football Federation) Sporting CP
6	MF	Andreia Norton	15 August 1996 (aged 21)	11	1	(Portuguese Football Federation) SC Braga
7	MF	Cláudia Neto (Captain)	18 April 1988 (aged 29)	108	13	(German Football Association) VfL Wolfsburg
8	FW	Laura Luís	15 August 1992 (aged 25)	43	8	(Portuguese Football Federation) SC Braga
9	MF	Ana Borges	15 June 1990 (aged 27)	102	9	(Portuguese Football Federation) Sporting CP
10	FW	Ana Leite	23 October 1991 (aged 26)	47	0	(Portuguese Football Federation) Sporting CP
11	MF	Tatiana Pinto	28 March 1994 (aged 23)	34	1	(Portuguese Football Federation) Sporting CP
12	GK	Ana Rita Oliveira	27 January 1998 (aged 20)	0	0	(Portuguese Football Federation) SC Braga
13	MF	Fátima Pinto	16 January 1996 (aged 22)	31	0	(Portuguese Football Federation) Sporting CP
14	MF	Dolores Silva	7 August 1991 (aged 26)	86	11	(Portuguese Football Federation) SC Braga
15	DF	Carole Costa	3 May 1990 (aged 27)	92	8	(Portuguese Football Federation) Sporting CP
16	FW	Diana Silva	4 June 1995 (aged 22)	33	3	(Portuguese Football Federation) Sporting CP
17	MF	Vanessa Malho	12 April 1996 (aged 21)	46	4	(Portuguese Football Federation) SC Braga
18	FW	Carolina Mendes	27 November 1987 (aged 30)	70	13	(Italian Football Federation) Mozzanica
19	MF	Ana Capeta	22 December 1997 (aged 20)	3	0	(Portuguese Football Federation) Sporting CP
20	FW	Jéssica Silva	11 December 1994 (aged 23)	45	6	(Royal Spanish Football Federation) Levante UD
21	MF	Nádia Gomes	9 November 1996 (aged 21)	0	0	(United States Soccer Federation) Orlando Pride
22	GK	Rute Costa	1 June 1994 (aged 23)	2	0	(Portuguese Football Federation) SC Braga
23	MF	Mélissa Antunes	8 January 1990 (aged 28)	29	1	(Portuguese Football Federation) SC Braga

== Group B ==
=== Canada ===
Coach: (Denmark) Kenneth Heiner-Møller

The squad was announced on 14 February 2018.

No.	Pos.	Player	Date of birth (age)	Caps	Goals	Club
1	GK	Stephanie Labbé	10 October 1986 (aged 31)	47	0	(United States Soccer Federation) Washington Spirit
2	DF	Allysha Chapman	25 January 1989 (aged 29)	47	1	(United States Soccer Federation) North Carolina Courage
3	DF	Kadeisha Buchanan	5 November 1995 (aged 22)	72	3	(French Football Federation) Lyon
4	DF	Shelina Zadorsky	24 August 1992 (aged 25)	34	1	(United States Soccer Federation) Orlando Pride
5	MF	Quinn (Note: Then known as Rebecca Quinn)	11 August 1995 (aged 22)	33	3	(United States Soccer Federation) Washington Spirit
6	FW	Deanne Rose	3 March 1999 (aged 18)	30	7	(United States Soccer Federation) Florida Gators
7	MF	Maegan Kelly	19 February 1992 (aged 26)	3	0	(United States Soccer Federation) Utah Royals
8	MF	Diana Matheson	6 April 1984 (aged 33)	191	17	(United States Soccer Federation) Utah Royals
9	FW	Jordyn Huitema	8 May 2001 (aged 16)	7	2	(Canadian Soccer Association) Vancouver Whitecaps
10	DF	Ashley Lawrence	11 June 1995 (aged 22)	56	4	(French Football Federation) Paris Saint-Germain
11	MF	Desiree Scott	31 July 1987 (aged 30)	129	0	(United States Soccer Federation) Utah Royals
12	FW	Christine Sinclair (Captain)	12 June 1983 (aged 34)	262	169	(United States Soccer Federation) Portland Thorns
13	MF	Sophie Schmidt	28 June 1988 (aged 29)	164	18	(German Football Association) 1. FFC Frankfurt
15	FW	Nichelle Prince	19 February 1995 (aged 23)	32	6	(United States Soccer Federation) Houston Dash
16	FW	Janine Beckie	20 August 1994 (aged 23)	37	20	(United States Soccer Federation) Sky Blue
17	MF	Jessie Fleming	11 March 1998 (aged 19)	47	4	(United States Soccer Federation) UCLA Bruins
18	GK	Erin McLeod	26 February 1983 (aged 35)	115	0	(German Football Association) FF USV Jena
19	FW	Adriana Leon	2 October 1992 (aged 25)	44	8	(United States Soccer Federation) Sky Blue
20	DF	Shannon Woeller	31 January 1990 (aged 28)	19	0	(German Football Association) FF USV Jena
21	GK	Kailen Sheridan	16 July 1995 (aged 22)	4	0	(United States Soccer Federation) Sky Blue
22	DF	Lindsay Agnew	31 March 1995 (aged 22)	7	0	(United States Soccer Federation) Houston Dash
23	MF	Julia Grosso	29 August 2000 (aged 17)	1	0	(Canadian Soccer Association) Vancouver Whitecaps
24	FW	Jenna Hellstrom	2 April 1995 (aged 22)	0	0	(Swedish Football Association) Djurgården

=== Russia ===
Coach: Elena Fomina

The squad was announced on 22 February 2018.

No.	Pos.	Player	Date of birth (age)	Caps	Goals	Club
1	GK	Tatyana Shcherbak	22 October 1997 (aged 20)	8	0	(Russian Football Union) Krasnodar
2	DF	Anastasiya Akimova	12 May 1991 (aged 26)	1	0	(Russian Football Union) Zvezda Perm
3	DF	Anna Kozhnikova	10 July 1987 (aged 30)	71	5	(Russian Football Union) CSKA Moscow
4	DF	Ekaterina Lazareva	25 March 1990 (aged 27)	1	0	(Royal Belgian Football Association) Anderlecht
5	MF	Ekaterina Tyryshkina	31 January 1996 (aged 22)	3	0	(French Football Federation) Rodez
6	MF	Alena Andreeva	21 November 1997 (aged 20)	3	0	(Russian Football Union) Chertanovo Moscow
7	MF	Irina Podshibyakina	5 July 1995 (aged 22)	0	0	(Russian Football Union) Zvezda Perm
8	FW	Valentina Zhukova	26 July 1992 (aged 25)	0	0	(Russian Football Union) Yenisey
9	DF	Maria Galay	14 October 1992 (aged 25)	0	0	(Russian Football Union) Zvezda Perm
10	MF	Nadezhda Smirnova	22 February 1996 (aged 22)	7	0	(Russian Football Union) CSKA Moscow
11	FW	Ekaterina Sochneva	12 August 1985 (aged 32)	87	21	(Russian Football Union) CSKA Moscow
12	GK	Elvira Todua	31 January 1986 (aged 32)	80	0	(Russian Football Union) CSKA Moscow
13	DF	Anna Belomyttseva	24 November 1996 (aged 21)	5	0	(Russian Football Union) Ryazan
14	FW	Nasiba Gasanova	15 December 1994 (aged 23)	0	0	(Russian Football Union) Krasnodar
15	FW	Elena Danilova	17 June 1987 (aged 30)	33	11	(Russian Football Union) Ryazan
16	FW	Marina Fedorova	10 May 1997 (aged 20)	8	0	(Russian Football Union) Ryazan
17	FW	Sofia Shishkina	30 September 1998 (aged 19)	0	0	(Russian Football Union) Zvezda Perm
18	MF	Elvira Ziyastinova	13 February 1991 (aged 27)	19	0	(Russian Football Union) CSKA Moscow
19	DF	Nadezhda Koltakova	4 June 1992 (aged 25)	0	0	(Russian Football Union) Donchanka Azov
20	MF	Margarita Chernomyrdina	6 March 1996 (aged 21)	24	2	(Russian Football Union) Chertanovo Moscow
21	GK	Yulia Grichenko	10 March 1990 (aged 27)	14	0	(Russian Football Union) CSKA Moscow
22	DF	Maria Alekseeva	23 October 1998 (aged 19)	0	0	(Russian Football Union) Rossiyanka
23	MF	Elena Morozova	15 March 1987 (aged 30)	91	19	(Russian Football Union) Krasnodar

=== South Korea ===
Coach: Yoon Deok-yeo

The squad was announced on 10 February 2018.

No.	Pos.	Player	Date of birth (age)	Caps	Goals	Club
1	GK	Yoon Young-guel	28 October 1987 (aged 30)	2	0	(Korea Football Association) Gyeongju KHNP
2	DF	Park Cho-rong	20 February 1988 (aged 30)	2	0	(Korea Football Association) Hwacheon KSPO
3	DF	Shin Dam-yeong	2 October 1993 (aged 24)	28	1	(Korea Football Association) Suwon FMC
4	DF	Shim Seo-yeon	15 April 1989 (aged 28)	54	0	(Korea Football Association) Incheon Hyundai Steel Red Angels
5	DF	Hong Hye-ji	25 August 1996 (aged 21)	7	1	(Korea Football Association) Changnyeong WFC
6	DF	Lim Seon-joo	27 November 1990 (aged 27)	62	3	(Korea Football Association) Incheon Hyundai Steel Red Angels
7	MF	Lee Min-a	8 November 1991 (aged 26)	55	6	(Japan Football Association) INAC Kobe Leonessa
8	MF	Cho So-hyun	24 June 1988 (aged 29)	105	17	(Korea Football Association) Incheon Hyundai Steel Red Angels
9	FW	Jeon Ga-eul	14 September 1988 (aged 29)	84	35	(Football Australia) Melbourne Victory
10	FW	Ji So-yun	21 February 1991 (aged 27)	96	45	(The Football Association) Chelsea
11	FW	Jung Seol-bin	1 June 1990 (aged 27)	65	19	(Korea Football Association) Incheon Hyundai Steel Red Angels
12	DF	Jang Sel-gi	31 May 1994 (aged 23)	35	8	(Korea Football Association) Incheon Hyundai Steel Red Angels
13	MF	Lee Young-ju	22 April 1992 (aged 25)	20	2	(Korea Football Association) Incheon Hyundai Steel Red Angels
14	FW	Choe Yu-ri	16 September 1994 (aged 23)	20	4	(Korea Football Association) Gumi Sportstoto
15	MF	Lee So-dam	12 October 1994 (aged 23)	41	4	(Korea Football Association) Incheon Hyundai Steel Red Angels
16	FW	Han Chae-rin	2 September 1996 (aged 21)	5	2	(Korea Football Association) Hwacheon KSPO
17	FW	Lee Geum-min	7 April 1994 (aged 23)	30	11	(Korea Football Association) Gyeongju KHNP
18	GK	Kang Ga-ae	10 December 1990 (aged 27)	9	0	(Korea Football Association) Gumi Sportstoto
19	FW	Son Hwa-yeon	15 March 1997 (aged 20)	3	2	(Korea Football Association) Changnyeong WFC
20	DF	Kim Hye-ri	25 June 1990 (aged 27)	66	1	(Korea Football Association) Incheon Hyundai Steel Red Angels
21	GK	Kim Min-jeong	12 September 1996 (aged 21)	2	0	(Korea Football Association) Incheon Hyundai Steel Red Angels
22	MF	Jang Chang	21 June 1996 (aged 21)	5	0	(Korea Football Association) Korea University
23	MF	Choi Ye-seul	24 December 1998 (aged 19)	0	0	(Japan Football Association) INAC Kobe Leonessa

=== Sweden ===
Coach: Peter Gerhardsson

The squad was announced on 13 February 2018. Anna Oscarsson replaced Nilla Fischer on 20 February 2018. Sandra Adolfsson replaced Nathalie Björn on 21 February 2018. Amanda Edgren replaced Lina Hurtig on 27 February 2018.

No.	Pos.	Player	Date of birth (age)	Caps	Goals	Club
1	GK	Hedvig Lindahl	29 April 1983 (aged 34)	145	0	(The Football Association) Chelsea
2	DF	Jonna Andersson	2 January 1993 (aged 25)	25	0	(The Football Association) Chelsea
3	DF	Linda Sembrant	15 May 1987 (aged 30)	93	8	(French Football Federation) Montpellier
4	DF	Hanna Glas	16 April 1993 (aged 24)	8	0	(Swedish Football Association) Eskilstuna United
5	DF	Anna Oscarsson	23 June 1996 (aged 21)	1	0	(Swedish Football Association) Linköping
6	DF	Magdalena Eriksson	8 September 1993 (aged 24)	31	4	(The Football Association) Chelsea
7	FW	Loreta Kullashi	20 May 1999 (aged 18)	1	2	(Swedish Football Association) Eskilstuna United
8	MF	Amanda Edgren	24 August 1993 (aged 24)	2	0	(Swedish Football Association) Kristianstads
9	MF	Kosovare Asllani	29 July 1989 (aged 28)	110	30	(Swedish Football Association) Linköping
10	FW	Sofia Jakobsson	23 April 1990 (aged 27)	78	13	(French Football Federation) Montpellier
11	FW	Stina Blackstenius	5 February 1996 (aged 22)	31	5	(French Football Federation) Montpellier
12	GK	Hilda Carlén	13 August 1991 (aged 26)	8	0	(Swedish Football Association) Piteå
13	DF	Amanda Ilestedt	17 January 1993 (aged 25)	12	2	(German Football Association) Turbine Potsdam
14	MF	Hanna Folkesson	15 June 1988 (aged 29)	38	0	(Swedish Football Association) Rosengård
15	MF	Sandra Adolfsson	13 June 1987 (aged 30)	1	0	(Swedish Football Association) Vittsjö
16	DF	Mia Carlsson	12 March 1990 (aged 27)	4	0	(Swedish Football Association) Kristianstads
17	MF	Caroline Seger (captain)	19 March 1985 (aged 32)	179	25	(Swedish Football Association) Rosengård
18	FW	Fridolina Rolfö	24 November 1993 (aged 24)	27	5	(German Football Association) Bayern Munich
19	MF	Filippa Angeldal	14 July 1997 (aged 20)	0	0	(Swedish Football Association) Linköping
20	FW	Mimmi Larsson	9 April 1994 (aged 23)	9	1	(Swedish Football Association) Eskilstuna United
21	GK	Zećira Mušović	26 May 1996 (aged 21)	0	0	(Swedish Football Association) Rosengård
22	FW	Olivia Schough	11 March 1991 (aged 26)	60	8	(Swedish Football Association) Kopparbergs/Göteborg
23	MF	Elin Rubensson	11 May 1993 (aged 24)	48	0	(Swedish Football Association) Kopparbergs/Göteborg

== Group C ==
=== Denmark ===
Coach: Lars Søndergaard

No.	Pos.	Player	Date of birth (age)	Caps	Goals	Club
1	GK	Stina Lykke Petersen	9 February 1986 (aged 32)	75	0	(Danish Football Association) KoldingQ
2	DF	Mie Leth Jans	6 February 1994 (aged 24)	21	0	(The Football Association) Manchester City
3	DF	Janni Arnth (Vice-captain)	15 October 1986 (aged 31)	79	1	(Swedish Football Association) Linköping
4	DF	Rikke Sevecke	15 June 1996 (aged 21)	2	0	(Danish Football Association) Brøndby
5	DF	Simone Boye Sørensen	3 March 1992 (aged 25)	47	4	(Swedish Football Association) Rosengård
6	MF	Nanna Christiansen	17 June 1989 (aged 28)	84	7	(Danish Football Association) Brøndby
7	MF	Sanne Troelsgaard Nielsen	15 August 1988 (aged 29)	120	41	(Swedish Football Association) Rosengård
8	DF	Theresa Nielsen	20 July 1986 (aged 31)	118	4	(United States Soccer Federation) Seattle Reign
9	FW	Nadia Nadim	2 January 1988 (aged 30)	76	23	(The Football Association) Manchester City
10	FW	Pernille Harder (Captain)	15 November 1992 (aged 25)	95	50	(German Football Association) VfL Wolfsburg
11	DF	Katrine Veje	19 June 1991 (aged 26)	105	9	(French Football Federation) Montpellier
12	FW	Stine Larsen	24 January 1996 (aged 22)	32	7	(Danish Football Association) Brøndby
13	MF	Sofie Junge Pedersen	24 April 1992 (aged 25)	48	4	(Royal Spanish Football Federation) Levante UD
14	MF	Nicoline Sørensen	15 August 1997 (aged 20)	13	2	(Swedish Football Association) Linköping
15	FW	Frederikke Thøgersen	24 July 1995 (aged 22)	33	0	(Danish Football Association) Fortuna Hjørring
16	GK	Naja Bahrenscheer	3 September 1996 (aged 21)	1	0	(Danish Football Association) BSF
17	FW	Signe Bruun	6 April 1998 (aged 19)	1	1	(Danish Football Association) Fortuna Hjørring
18	MF	Karoline Smidt Nielsen	12 May 1994 (aged 23)	18	5	(Danish Football Association) Fortuna Hjørring
19	DF	Cecilie Sandvej	13 June 1990 (aged 27)	31	1	(German Football Association) 1. FFC Frankfurt
20	DF	Laura Frank	3 August 1998 (aged 19)	0	0	(Danish Football Association) Fortuna Hjørring
21	MF	Caroline Rask	25 May 1994 (aged 23)	4	1	(Danish Football Association) Fortuna Hjørring
23	MF	Karen Holmgaard	28 January 1999 (aged 19)	0	0	(Danish Football Association) Fortuna Hjørring

=== Iceland ===
Coach: Freyr Alexandersson

The squad was announced on 15 February 2018. Berglind Björg Þorvaldsdóttir replaced Sigrún Ella Einarsdóttir on 26 February 2018.

No.	Pos.	Player	Date of birth (age)	Caps	Goals	Club
1	GK	Guðbjörg Gunnarsdóttir	18 May 1985 (aged 32)	59	0	(Swedish Football Association) Djurgården
2	DF	Sif Atladóttir	15 July 1985 (aged 32)	73	0	(Swedish Football Association) Kristianstad
3	DF	Anna Rakel Pétursdóttir	24 August 1998 (aged 19)	4	0	(Football Association of Iceland) Þór/KA
4	DF	Glódís Perla Viggósdóttir	27 June 1995 (aged 22)	65	3	(Swedish Football Association) Rosengård
5	MF	Gunnhildur Yrsa Jónsdóttir	28 September 1988 (aged 29)	53	7	(United States Soccer Federation) Utah Royals
6	DF	Ingibjörg Sigurðardóttir	7 October 1997 (aged 20)	12	0	(Swedish Football Association) Djurgården
7	MF	Sara Björk Gunnarsdóttir (Captain)	29 September 1990 (aged 27)	116	19	(German Football Association) VfL Wolfsburg
8	MF	Andrea Mist Pálsdóttir	25 October 1998 (aged 19)	2	0	(Football Association of Iceland) Þór/KA
9	MF	Katrín Ásbjörnsdóttir	11 December 1992 (aged 25)	19	1	(Football Association of Iceland) Stjarnan
10	MF	Andrea Rán Hauksdóttir	28 January 1996 (aged 22)	7	2	(Football Association of Iceland) Breiðablik
11	DF	Hallbera Guðný Gísladóttir	14 September 1986 (aged 31)	93	3	(Football Association of Iceland) Valur
12	GK	Sandra Sigurðardóttir	2 October 1986 (aged 31)	18	0	(Football Association of Iceland) Valur
13	GK	Sonný Lára Þráinsdóttir	12 September 1986 (aged 31)	4	0	(Football Association of Iceland) Breiðablik
14	FW	Hlín Eiríksdóttir	12 July 2000 (aged 17)	5	1	(Football Association of Iceland) Valur
15	MF	Selma Sól Magnúsdóttir	23 April 1998 (aged 19)	4	0	(Football Association of Iceland) Breiðablik
16	FW	Berglind Björg Þorvaldsdóttir	18 January 1992 (aged 26)	31	2	(Italian Football Federation) Verona
17	MF	Agla María Albertsdóttir	5 August 1999 (aged 18)	14	0	(Football Association of Iceland) Stjarnan
18	MF	Sandra Jessen	18 January 1995 (aged 23)	25	6	(Football Association of Iceland) Þór/KA
19	DF	Anna Björk Kristjánsdóttir	14 October 1989 (aged 28)	39	0	(Swedish Football Association) Limhamn Bunkeflo
20	DF	Guðný Árnadóttir	4 August 2000 (aged 17)	4	0	(Football Association of Iceland) FH
21	MF	Svava Rós Guðmundsdóttir	11 November 1995 (aged 22)	10	0	(Norwegian Football Federation) Røa
22	MF	Rakel Hönnudóttir	30 December 1988 (aged 29)	90	5	(Swedish Football Association) Limhamn Bunkeflo
23	FW	Fanndís Friðriksdóttir	9 May 1990 (aged 27)	92	14	(French Football Federation) Marseille

=== Japan ===
Coach: Asako Takakura

The squad was announced on 9 February 2018.

No.	Pos.	Player	Date of birth (age)	Caps	Goals	Club
1	GK	Sakiko Ikeda	8 September 1992 (aged 25)	8	0	(Japan Football Association) Urawa Red Diamonds
2	DF	Rumi Utsugi	5 December 1988 (aged 29)	103	5	(United States Soccer Federation) Seattle Reign
3	DF	Aya Sameshima	16 June 1987 (aged 30)	84	4	(Japan Football Association) INAC Kobe Leonessa
4	DF	Saki Kumagai (Captain)	17 October 1990 (aged 27)	90	0	(French Football Federation) Lyon
5	DF	Nana Ichise	4 August 1997 (aged 20)	6	0	(Japan Football Association) Vegalta Sendai
6	MF	Saori Ariyoshi	1 November 1987 (aged 30)	49	1	(Japan Football Association) Nippon TV Beleza
7	MF	Emi Nakajima	27 September 1990 (aged 27)	46	9	(Japan Football Association) INAC Kobe Leonessa
8	FW	Mana Iwabuchi	18 March 1993 (aged 24)	43	11	(Japan Football Association) INAC Kobe Leonessa
9	FW	Kumi Yokoyama	13 August 1993 (aged 24)	24	11	(German Football Association) 1. FFC Frankfurt
10	MF	Mizuho Sakaguchi	15 October 1987 (aged 30)	116	28	(Japan Football Association) Nippon TV Beleza
11	FW	Mina Tanaka	28 April 1994 (aged 23)	18	6	(Japan Football Association) Nippon TV Beleza
12	MF	Hikaru Naomoto	3 March 1994 (aged 23)	15	0	(Japan Football Association) Urawa Red Diamonds
13	FW	Madoka Haji	8 July 1988 (aged 29)	6	0	(Japan Football Association) Vegalta Sendai
14	MF	Yui Hasegawa	29 January 1997 (aged 21)	13	2	(Japan Football Association) Nippon TV Beleza
15	FW	Yuika Sugasawa	5 October 1990 (aged 27)	43	11	(Japan Football Association) Urawa Red Diamonds
16	MF	Rin Sumida	12 January 1996 (aged 22)	7	0	(Japan Football Association) Nippon TV Beleza
17	DF	Hikari Takagi	21 May 1993 (aged 24)	13	0	(Japan Football Association) Nojima Stella Kanagawa Sagamihara
18	GK	Ayaka Yamashita	29 September 1995 (aged 22)	11	0	(Japan Football Association) Nippon TV Beleza
19	MF	Rika Masuya	14 September 1995 (aged 22)	15	3	(Japan Football Association) INAC Kobe Leonessa
20	DF	Shiori Miyake	13 October 1995 (aged 22)	6	0	(Japan Football Association) INAC Kobe Leonessa
21	GK	Erina Yamane	20 December 1990 (aged 27)	23	0	(Royal Spanish Football Federation) Real Betis
22	DF	Risa Shimizu	15 June 1996 (aged 21)	0	0	(Japan Football Association) Nippon TV Beleza
23	DF	Ayumi Oya	8 November 1994 (aged 23)	8	0	(Japan Football Association) Ehime FC

=== Netherlands ===
Coach: Sarina Wiegman

The squad was announced on 20 February 2018.

No.	Pos.	Player	Date of birth (age)	Caps	Goals	Club
1	GK	Sari van Veenendaal	3 April 1990 (aged 27)	42	0	(The Football Association) Arsenal
2	DF	Desiree van Lunteren	30 December 1992 (aged 25)	54	0	(Royal Dutch Football Association) Ajax
3	DF	Stefanie van der Gragt	16 August 1992 (aged 25)	48	6	(Royal Dutch Football Association) Ajax
4	MF	Kelly Zeeman	19 November 1993 (aged 24)	22	0	(Royal Dutch Football Association) Ajax
5	DF	Kika van Es	11 October 1991 (aged 26)	45	0	(Royal Dutch Football Association) Twente
7	FW	Shanice van de Sanden	2 October 1992 (aged 25)	49	10	(French Football Federation) Lyon
8	MF	Sherida Spitse (captain)	29 May 1990 (aged 27)	144	24	(Norwegian Football Federation) Vålerenga
11	FW	Lieke Martens	16 December 1992 (aged 25)	85	33	(Royal Spanish Football Federation) Barcelona
12	MF	Jill Roord	22 April 1997 (aged 20)	23	3	(German Football Association) Bayern Munich
13	FW	Renate Jansen	7 December 1990 (aged 27)	22	3	(Royal Dutch Football Association) Twente
14	MF	Jackie Groenen	17 December 1994 (aged 23)	30	1	(German Football Association) 1. FFC Frankfurt
15	DF	Cheyenne van den Goorbergh	6 September 1997 (aged 20)	0	0	(Royal Dutch Football Association) Twente
16	GK	Jennifer Vreugdenhil	12 January 1995 (aged 23)	0	0	(Royal Spanish Football Federation) Valencia
17	DF	Merel van Dongen	11 February 1993 (aged 25)	18	1	(Royal Dutch Football Association) Ajax
18	FW	Esmee de Graaf	17 August 1997 (aged 20)	0	0	(Royal Dutch Football Association) PEC Zwolle
19	MF	Sheila van den Bulk	6 April 1989 (aged 28)	4	0	(Swedish Football Association) Djurgården
20	DF	Dominique Janssen	17 January 1995 (aged 23)	27	0	(The Football Association) Arsenal
21	FW	Lineth Beerensteyn	11 October 1996 (aged 21)	21	3	(German Football Association) Bayern Munich
22	DF	Liza van der Most	8 October 1993 (aged 24)	10	0	(Royal Dutch Football Association) Ajax
23	GK	Lize Kop	17 March 1998 (aged 19)	0	0	(Royal Dutch Football Association) Ajax
24	DF	Danique Kerkdijk	1 May 1996 (aged 21)	7	0	(The Football Association) Bristol City
25	FW	Katja Snoeijs	31 August 1996 (aged 21)	0	0	(Royal Dutch Football Association) Alkmaar
26	FW	Ellen Jansen	6 October 1992 (aged 25)	7	1	(Royal Dutch Football Association) Twente
29	DF	Siri Worm	20 April 1992 (aged 25)	33	0	(The Football Association) Everton

== Player representation ==
=== By club ===
Clubs with 5 or more players represented are listed.

Players	Club
9	(Portugal) Sporting CP, (South Korea) Incheon Hyundai Steel Red Angels
8	(Portugal) SC Braga
7	(Japan) INAC Kobe Leonessa, (Japan) Nippon TV Beleza, (Sweden) Linköping
6	(China) Jiangsu Suning, (Denmark) Fortuna Hjørring, (England) Chelsea, (Netherlands) Ajax, (Norway) LSK Kvinner, (Russia) CSKA Moscow, (Sweden) Rosengård
5	(Australia) Brisbane Roar, (Sweden) Djurgården, (United States) Utah Royals

=== By club nationality ===
Players	Clubs
30	Sweden
22	Australia
21	China, Japan, Russia
20	United States
19	South Korea
17	Norway, Portugal
16	Germany
12	England, Iceland, Netherlands
11	Denmark, France
5	Italy, Spain
2	Canada
1	Belgium

=== By club federation ===
Players	Federation
170	UEFA
83	AFC
22	CONCACAF

=== By representatives of domestic league ===
National squad	Players
Australia	21
China	21
Russia	21
Japan	19
South Korea	19
Portugal	17
Norway	15
Sweden	15
Iceland	12
Netherlands	12
Denmark	11
Canada	2
