= Amanda Edgren =

Swedish footballer (born 1993)

Personal information
- Full name: Elsa Amanda Edgren
- Date of birth: 24 August 1993 (age 33)
- Place of birth: Skee, Sweden
- Height: 1.79 m (5 ft 10 in)
- Position: Midfielder

Youth career
- Öjersjö IF
- 2011: Qviding FIF

Senior career*
Years	Team	Apps	(Gls)
2011–2015	Kopparbergs/Göteborg FC	38	(3)
2015–2021	Kristianstads DFF	152	(34)
2022–2023	Sporting de Huelva	35	(3)
2024	IFK Göteborg	6	(1)

International career^{‡}
2017–2018	Sweden	5	(0)
- * Club domestic league appearances and goals as of 30 November 2023 ‡ National team caps and goals as of 13 March 2018

Elsa Amanda Edgren (born 24 August 1993) is a Swedish professional footballer who plays as a midfielder.

== Playing career ==
=== Club ===
==== Göteborg FC ====
Originally from Kåhög, Sweden, Edgren signed with Swedish side, Kopparbergs/Göteborg FC in the Damallsvenskan, the top division of women's soccer in Sweden, at age 18. She made her debut for the club during a match against Linköping FC in which the teams tied 0-0. Edgren served an assist to Jenny Hallstenson helping Göteborg defeat KIF Örebro 3-1 on 6 August 2011. She finished the 2011 season having played in six matches. Göteborg won the Swedish Cup the same year.

During the 2012 season, Edgren made 1 start in 11 appearances for Göteborg. She scored two goals during the season: one during a 1-2 defeat against Vittsjö and the other during a 5-0 victory against Umeå. Göteborg was runner-up for the Swedish Super Cup 2012 losing 2-1 to LdB FC Malmö. In April 2013, Göteborg defeated 2012 Damallsvenskan champions, Tyresö FF to win the Swedish Supercup. Edgren returned to the squad for the 2013 season. She scored her first goal of the season during a 5-1 win against Sunnanå on 13 April.

=== International ===
Edgren has represented Sweden at the U-20 level.

== Honours ==
Kopparbergs/Göteborg FC

- Svenska Cupen: 2011–12
- Svenska Supercupen: 2013

Sweden

- Algarve Cup: 2018
