= Choi Ye-seul =

Choi Ye-seul may refer to:

- Choi Ye-seul (footballer, born 1998), South Korean football midfielder
- Choi Ye-seul (footballer, born 1997), South Korean football goalkeeper
