= Þórður Lárusson =

Icelandic former football namager (born 1954)

Personal information
- Full name: Þórður Georg Lárusson
- Date of birth: 29 December 1954 (age 71)
- Place of birth: Iceland

Managerial career
- Years: Team
- 1986: Ármann
- 1990–1993: Iceland U-17
- 1994–1997: Stjarnan
- 1999–2000: Iceland women
- 1999–2000: Iceland U-21 women

Þórður Georg Lárusson (born 29 December 1954) is an Icelandic former football manager. He was the manager of the Icelandic women's national football team from 1999 to 2000 and Stjarnan from 1994 to 1997.

== Managing career ==
=== Ármann ===
Þórður was the manager of Ármann in 1986.

=== Stjarnan ===
On 10 October 1994, Þórður was hired as co-manager, with Helgi Þórðarson, of Stjarnan. Together, they guided the team to a second place finish in the second-tier Icelandic league and achieved promotion to the top-tier league. After the season, in September 1995, he was hired as the sole-manager of the team. Stjarnan finished 6th in the league in 1996 and after the season his contract was renewed for the 1997 season. On 23 June 1997, with Stjarnan in last place, the board fired Þórður as manager.

=== Iceland ===
Þórður was hired as the manager of the Icelandic women's national football team as well as the Icelandic U-21 team in 1999. His first games with the U-21 team where during the Nordic Championships in August 1999 where the team finished in 6th place. His first game with the senior team was on 22 August, in the UEFA Women's Euro 2001 qualification, when it managed a 2-2 tie with Ukraine. On 22 September, Iceland faced Italy where it again drew, this time 0-0. In what ended being his last game with the team, Iceland lost 0-5 to Germany on 14 October 1999. In February 2000 it was reported that 10 players threatened to quit the team if Þórður remained as manager. The Football Association of Iceland initially refused to accede to the demands but in March it announced that Þórður had resigned from his post. In 2013, Þórður claimed that the unhappiness of the players was due to his plan to drop some of the older players from the program and bring in some younger players. On 16 August 2018, Þóra Helgadóttir, a former goalkeeper for the team who was 18-years-old at the time, claimed in a speech during a conference on gender and sport, held at the Reykjavík University, that the players were upset about his unprofessionalism that included lack of proper training, not knowing the names of all players and the positions they played, and the use of alcohol during away game trip. Her claims were backed up by other former players of the team, including Guðlaug Jónsdóttir and Ásthildur Helgadóttir. In a statement the day after, Þórður vehemently denied the allegations of alcohol misuse and any misconduct during the trip while former Football Association president Eggert Magnússon stated that he never heard of any accusations of misconduct during the trip.

==== Managerial statistics ====
As of 17 August 2018

Role	From	To	Record					
Role	From	To	G	W	D	L	Win %	Unbeaten %
Iceland manager	1999	2000	3	0	2	1	0.00	66.67
