= Vestri (men's football) =

Icelandic football club

- Full name: Íþróttafélagið Vestri
- Nickname: Djúpmenn
- Founded: 1986; 40 years ago, as Badmintonfélag Ísafjarðar; 1988; 38 years ago, as BÍ'88; 2006; 20 years ago as BÍ/Bolungarvík; 2016; 10 years ago as Vestri
- Ground: Kerecisvöllurinn, Ísafjörður
- Capacity: 1,596
- Manager: Daniel Osafo-Badu
- League: 1. deild karla
- 2025: Besta deild karla, 11th of 12 (relegated)
Home colours	Away colours

The Vestri men's football team, commonly known as Vestri, is the men's football department of the Íþróttafélagið Vestri multi-sport club and is based in Ísafjarðarbær, Iceland. In 2025, the team won the Icelandic Cup after defeating Valur in the Cup final. As of 2026, it plays in the Icelandic second-tier 1. deild karla.

== History ==
The club was founded in 1986 as the football department of Badmintonfélag Ísafjarðar, or BÍ for short. It first participated in the Icelandic tier-4 league, then known as 4. deild karla, that same year and their first coach was former Icelandic international player Björn Helgason. In 1988, Ísafjörður biggest club, Íþróttabandalag Ísafjarðar (ÍBÍ), folded after years of financial difficulties and most of their players moved over to BÍ who took over as the town's major football club. The club took up the name BÍ'88 to mark the new beginning and Jóhann Króknes Torfason was hired as the head coach. They won their group in 4. deild convincingly, scoring 46 goals while conceding only 3, with their biggest win being an 18–0 victory over Höfrungur. In the 4. deild playoff they came out on top and achieved promotion to 3. deild karla where they played the next three years. In 1991 the team achieved promotion to 2. deild karla after finishing as runner-up's in 3. deild. They played there for two years before being relegated back to 3. deild. After the 1996 season, the club withdrew from play due to financial difficulties.

From 2006 to 2016 the team fielded a joint team with Ungmennafélag Bolungarvíkur, called BÍ/Bolungarvík. In 2008 the team was promoted to 2. deild karla and in 2010 to 1. deild karla. In October 2010 the team hired Guðjón Þórðarson as their manager. In 2016 the club merged into Íþróttafélagið Vestri along with Skellur (Volleyball), Sundfélagið Vestri (Swim) and KFÍ (Basketball).

On 21 September 2019, Vestri won a 7–0 victory against Tindastóll in the last game of the season and secured a promotion to the second-tier 1. deild karla.

On 30 September 2023, Vestri defeated Afturelding in the 1. deild karla promotion playoff final to secure a berth in the top-tier Besta deild karla for the first time in its history.

On 22 August 2025, Vestri defeated Valur in the Icelandic Cup final, 1–0, securing its first ever major trophy. With the win, it secured a berth in a European competition for the first time. Vestri became the first non-top flight Icelandic club to participate in a UEFA club competition, losing 6–0 on aggregate against Qarabağ FK in the UEFA Europa League first qualifying round.

== European record ==
Season	Competition	Round	Club	Home	Away	Aggregate
2026–27	UEFA Europa League	1QR	(Azerbaijan) Qarabağ	0–3	0–3	0–6
2026–27	UEFA Conference League	2QR	(Latvia) RFS	1–1	1–4	2–5

== Squad ==
=== Current squad ===
As of 25 September 2026

Note: Flags indicate national team as defined under FIFA eligibility rules; some limited exceptions apply. Players may hold more than one non-FIFA nationality.

No.	Pos.	Nation	Player
1	GK	ISL	Marvin Darri Steinarsson
2	DF	ISL	Gabriel Heidberg Kristjansson
4	MF	NGR	Fatai Gbadamosi
5	DF	NED	Devyn Payne
6	MF	SEN	Ibrahima Baldé
8	MF	DEN	Imran Mehanovic
9	FW	ISL	Pétur Bjarnason
10	FW	ISL	Þórður Gunnar Hafþórsson
12	MF	RSA	Cafú Phete
13	MF	ISL	Albert Ingi Jóhannsson
14	MF	ISL	Birkir Eydal
15	DF	ISL	Guðmundur Arnar Svavarsson

No.	Pos.	Nation	Player
16	MF	ESP	Marcos Campos
17	MF	ISL	Gunnar Jónas Hauksson
18	MF	ISL	Marinó Steinar Hagbardsson
19	FW	GHA	Emmanuel Duah
22	DF	ISL	Elmar Atli Garðarsson (captain)
23	FW	ISL	Breki Þór Hermannsson (on loan from Akraness)
27	MF	SWE	Albin Mörfelt
33	GK	ISL	Benedikt Johann Snaedal
45	DF	ISL	Gudmundur Pall Einarsson
77	MF	SEN	Sergine Fall
-	MF	SEN	Abdourahmane Diagne

== Player of the year ==
Year	Winner
1988	(Iceland) Guðmundur Gíslason

Year	Winner
2006	(Iceland) Sigurgeir Sveinn Gíslason
2007	(Iceland) Pétur Geir Svavarsson
2008	(Serbia) Goran Vujic
2009	(Iceland) Óttar Kristinn Bjarnason
2010	(Iceland) Sigurgeir Sveinn Gíslason

Year	Winner
2011	(Iceland) Þórður Ingason
2012	(Iceland) Andri Rúnar Bjarnason
2013	(Iceland) Hafsteinn Rúnar Helgason
2014	(Iceland) Matthías Króknes Jóhannsson
2015	(Gabon) Loic Cédric Mbang Ondo

Year	Winner
2016	(Iceland) Ernir Bjarnason
2017	(Iceland) Daði Freyr Arnarsson
2018	(Iceland) Elmar Atli Garðarsson
2019	(Croatia) Zoran Plazonic
2020	(Spain) Nacho Gil

Year	Winner
2021	(Denmark) Nicolaj Madsen
2022	
2023	(Denmark) Gustav Kjeldsen
2024	(Iceland) Eiður Aron Sigurbjörnsson
2025	(Nigeria) Fatai Gbadamosi
2026	(Senegal) Ibrahima Baldé

== Top scorers by season ==
Season	Player	League	Total Goals	Domestic League	Domestic Cup
2026	(Senegal) **Ibrahima Baldé**	1. deild	5	5	0
2025	(Iceland) Daði Berg Jónsson	Besta deild	7	5	2
2024	(Iceland) Andri Rúnar Bjarnason	Besta deild	8	8	0
2023	(Serbia) Vladimir Tufegdžić	1. deild	9	9	0
2022	(Serbia) Vladimir Tufegdžić	1. deild	6	4	2
2022	(Denmark) Nicolaj Madsen	1. deild	6	6	0
2021	(Iceland) **Pétur Bjarnason**	1. deild	14	11	3
2020	(Spain) Nacho Gil	1. deild	10	10	0
2019	(Iceland) **Pétur Bjarnason**	2. deild	12	7	5
2018	(Iceland) **Pétur Bjarnason**	2. deild	17	14	3
2017	(Iceland) **Pétur Bjarnason**	2. deild	6	6	0
2016	(Iceland) Sólon Breki Leifsson	2. deild	8	8	0
2015	(Iceland) Pape Mamadou Faye	1. deild	5	5	0
2014	(Iceland) Andri Rúnar Bjarnason	1. deild	11	7	4
2013	(England) Ben Everson	1. deild	12	10	2
2012	(Iceland) Pétur Georg Markan	1. deild	8	5	3
2011	(England) Tomi Ameobi	1. deild	12	11	1
2010	(Iceland) Andri Rúnar Bjarnason	2. deild	22	19	3
2009	(Iceland) Andri Rúnar Bjarnason	2. deild	8	8	0
2009	(Serbia) Goran Vujic	2. deild	8	8	0
2008	(Iceland) Andri Rúnar Bjarnason	3. deild	14	14	0
2007	(Iceland) Pétur Geir Svavarsson	3. deild	25	25	0
2006	(Iceland) Óttar Kristinn Bjarnason	3. deild	10	0	0
2005	(Iceland) Þröstur Pétursson	3. deild	4	4	0
2004	(Iceland) Hálfdán Daðason	3. deild	9	9	0
2004	(Iceland) Pétur Georg Markan	3. deild	9	9	0
2003	(Iceland) Pétur Georg Markan	3. deild	10	7	3
2002	(Iceland) Pétur Georg Markan	3. deild	4	4	0
1993	(Serbia) Djordje Tosic	1. deild	5	5	0
1993	(Iceland) Jóhann Þór Ævarsson	1. deild	5	5	0
1992	(Iceland) Jóhann Þór Ævarsson	1. deild	7	6	1
1988	(Iceland) Stefán Tryggvason	3. deild	10	-	

Players in bold are currently playing for Vestri.

== Former notable players ==
Players who have played for Vestri (Badmintonfélag Ísafjarðar, BÍ'88 and BÍ/Bolungarvík) and earned international caps at senior level. Correct as of 28 October 2025.

Nat.	Player	Date of birth	Current club	Position	International career
(Senegal)	Pape Abou Cissé	14 September 1995 (age 31)	Free Agent	Defender	2018–2022
(Zimbabwe)	Silas Songani	28 June 1989 (age 37)	(Zimbabwe) TelOne F.C.	Forward	2013–2018
(South Africa)	Cafu Phete	4 April 1994 (age 32)	(Iceland) Vestri	Midfielder	2020–present
(Iceland)	Eiður Aron Sigurbjörnsson	26 February 1990 (age 36)	(Iceland) Njarðvík	Defender	2019–present
(United States Virgin Islands)	James Charles Mack	10 August 1988 (age 38)	Retired	Forward	2018–present
(Iceland)	Andri Rúnar Bjarnason	12 December 1990 (age 35)	(Iceland) Stjarnan	Forward	2018–2019
(Zimbabwe)	Kundai Benyu	12 December 1997 (age 28)	(Zimbabwe) CAPS United	Midfielder	2017–present
(Gabon)	Loïc Cédric Mbang Ondo	5 October 1990 (age 35)	Retired	Defender	2017–2024
(Iceland)	Emil Pálsson	10 June 1993 (age 33)	Retired	Midfielder	2016
(Antigua and Barbuda)	Brentton Muhammad	11 September 1990 (age 36)	Retired	Goalkeeper	2014–2024
(Iceland)	Matthías Vilhjálmsson	30 January 1987 (age 39)	Retired	Forward	2009–2016
(Gabon)	Gilles Mbang Ondo	10 October 1985 (age 40)	Retired	Forward	2007–2013
(Scotland)	Nigel Quashie	20 July 1978 (age 48)	Retired	Midfielder	2004–2006

== Managerial history ==
Dates	Name	Notes
1986	(Iceland) Björn Helgason	
1987	(Iceland) Jakob Ólason	
1988	(Iceland) Jóhann Króknes Torfason	
1989	(Iceland) Örnólfur Oddsson	Player-manager
1990	(Iceland) Jóhann Króknes Torfason	
1991–1992	(Iceland) Ámundi Sigmundsson	Player-manager
1993	(Iceland) Helgi Helgason	
1994	(Iceland) Einar Friðþjófsson	
1995	(Iceland) Björn Ingimarsson	Fired midway through season
1995	(Iceland) Örnólfur Oddsson	Interim player-manager
1996	(Iceland) Ómar Torfason	Player-manager
2002–2004	(Iceland) Haukur Benediktsson	Player-manager
2005	(Iceland) Örnólfur Oddsson	
2006–2007	(Iceland) Jónas Leifur Sigursteinsson	
2008	(Serbia) Slobodan Milišić	
2009	(Serbia) Dragan Kažić	
2010	(Iceland) Alfreð Elías Jóhannsson	Player-manager
2011	(Iceland) Guðjón Þórðarson	
2012–2014	(Iceland) Jörundur Áki Sveinsson	
2015	(Iceland) Jón Hálfdán Pétursson	
2016	(Iceland) Ásgeir Guðmundsson	
2017	(England) Daniel Osafo-Badu	Player-manager
2017–2020	(Iceland) Bjarni Jóhannsson	
2020–2021	(Iceland) Heiðar Birnir Torleifsson	Resigned in July 2021
2021	(Iceland) Jón Þór Hauksson	
2022	(Iceland) Gunnar Heiðar Þorvaldsson	
2023–2025	(Iceland) Davíð Smári Lamude	Sacked 29 September 2025
2025	(Iceland) Jón Þór Hauksson	Appointed until the end of the season
2025–	(England) Daniel Osafo-Badu	

=== Honours ===
- Icelandic Cup:
  - Winners (1): 2025
- 1. deild karla
  - Play-off Winners (1): 2023
- 2. deild karla
  - Runner-up (3): 1991, 2010, 2019
- 3. deild karla
  - Winners (1): 1988
  - Runner-up (1): 2008
