= Silas Songani =

Zimbabwean footballer (born 1989)

Personal information
- Full name: Silas Dylan Songani
- Date of birth: 28 June 1989 (age 37)
- Place of birth: Harare, Zimbabwe
- Height: 1.70 m (5 ft 7 in)
- Position: Right winger

Team information
- Current team: Vestri
- Number: 23

Senior career*
Years	Team	Apps	(Gls)
2012–2014	Harare City		
2014–2019	SønderjyskE	53	(8)
2016	→ Sydvest 05 (loan)	10	(0)
2017	→ Elverum (loan)	13	(2)
2018–2019	→ Sydvest 05 (loan)	22	(12)
2019	Sydvest 05	10	(1)
2020–2022	Platinum		
2022–2025	Vestri	72	(7)

International career
2013–	Zimbabwe	11	(0)
- * Club domestic league appearances and goals as of 2 November 2025

Silas Dylan Songani (born 28 June 1989) is a Zimbabwean footballer who plays as midfielder for Vestri.

== Club career ==
=== Harare City ===
Songani started his career with hometown club Harare City.

=== SønderjyskE ===
In January 2014, Songani moved to Danish club SønderjyskE. He made his league debut for the club on 21 February 2014 in a 4–0 away win over FC Vestsjælland. In this match, he also scored his first league goal for the club. It was the fourth and final of the match, and came in the 75th minute. He was replaced by Henrik Hansen five minutes later.

Songani left SønderjyskE at the end of the 2018/19 season.

==== Loans ====
In August 2016, Songani was sent out on loan to FC Sydvest 05.

In July 2017, Songani was loaned out again, this time to Norwegian club Elverum. His league debut for the club came on 30 July 2017 in a 4–3 home loss to Florø SK. He was replaced by Sivert Solli in the 78th minute. His first league goal for the club came on 17 September 2017 in a 2–2 away draw with Ranheim Fotball. His goal, scored in the 24th minute, opened the scoring on the day.

Songani was loaned out to FC Sydvest once again on 31 August 2018 until the end of the year. He returned to SønderjyskE, but was loaned out again to the same club. This was announced on 29 January 2019. On 15 August 2019, he signed a permanent contract with the club.

=== Return to Zimbabwe ===
In January 2020, Songani signed with Zimbabwean club FC Platinum.

=== Vestri ===
Songani joined Vestri in 2022. On 22 August 2025, he won the Icelandic Cup with Vestri.
