= Loïc Mbang Ondo =

Gabonese footballer (born 1990)

Personal information
- Full name: Loïc Cédric Mbang Ondo
- Date of birth: 5 October 1990 (age 36)
- Place of birth: Rennes, France
- Height: 1.86 m (6 ft 1 in)
- Position: Defender

Team information
- Current team: Kórdrengir

Senior career*
Years	Team	Apps	(Gls)
2010–2012	Grindavík	30	(1)
2011	→ BÍ/Bolungarvík	18	(0)
2013–2015	BÍ/Bolungarvík	52	(5)
2016–2017	Fjarðarbyggð	34	(1)
2017–2018	Íþróttafélagið Grótta	5	(0)
2018–2020	Afturelding	18	(0)
2020–2022	Kórdrengir	53	(8)
2024	Hvíti riddarinn	0	(0)

International career^{‡}
2017–	Gabon	1	(0)
- * Club domestic league appearances and goals as of 19 August 2022 ‡ National team caps and goals as of 9 May 2019

Loïc Cédric Mbang Ondo (born 10 May 1990), is a footballer. In 2017, he debuted with the Gabonese national football team.

== Career ==
=== Club career ===
In 2010, Ondo signed with Grindavík of the Icelandic top-tier Úrvalsdeild karla. After appearing in 17 games for Grindavík during the 2010 season, he was loaned to BÍ/Bolungarvík for the 2011 season. Ondo returned to Grindavík for the 2012 season and appeared in 13 games, scoring 1 goal.

In February 2013, Ondo returned to BÍ/Bolungarvík and played there until 2016, appearing in 52 league games and scoring 5 goals. In April 2016, Ondo signed with 1. deild karla club Fjarðarbyggð. After one and a half seasons with Fjarðarbyggð, he transferred to Íþróttafélagið Grótta late in the 2017 season. In January 2018, Ondo signed with Afturelding. He appeared in 20 games during the 2018 season, helping Afturelding win the 2. deild karla and achieve promotion to the Inkasson league.

=== National team career ===
Ondo was selected for the Gabonese national football team ahead of its game against Guinea in March 2017.

=== Titles ===
- 2. deild karla
  - Winner: 2018

== Personal life ==
Ondo is the older brother of Ulrick Eneme Ella, who is currently playing for Angers II. He is also the younger brother of Gabonese international Gilles Mbang Ondo.
