= Valentina Zhukova =

Russian footballer

Personal information
- Full name: Valentina Nikolaevna Zhukova
- Date of birth: 26 July 1992 (age 34)
- Place of birth: Russia
- Height: 1.77 m (5 ft 10 in)
- Position: Forward

Senior career*
| Years | Team | Apps | (Gls) |
| 2017 | Yenisey | 14 | (4) |

International career^{‡}
| 2018 | Russia | 2 | (0) |
- * Club domestic league appearances and goals as of 2 November 2017 ‡ National team caps and goals as of 7 March 2018

Valentina Nikolaevna Zhukova (Russian: Валентина Николаевна Жукова; born 26 July 1992) is a Russian footballer who plays as a forward. She has been a member of the Russia women's national team.

== International career ==
Zhukova capped for Russia at senior level during the 2018 Algarve Cup.
