= Stelpurnar okkar =

- Directed by: Þóra Tómasdóttir
- Written by: Þóra Tómasdóttir
- Produced by: Hrafnhildur Gunnarsdóttir
- Cinematography: Bergsteinn Björgúlfsson; Hrafnhildur Gunnarsdóttir
- Edited by: Elísabet Ronaldsdóttir
- Music by: Barði Jóhannsson
- Distributed by: Krumma Films
- Release date: August 14, 2009 (Theater)
- Running time: 90 minutes
- Country: Iceland
- Language: Icelandic

Stelpurnar okkar (English: Our girls) is an Icelandic documentary film about the Icelandic women's national football team's quest to be the first Icelandic national football team to advance to a major continental tournament. It was directed by Þóra Tómasdóttir and produced by Krumma Films and premiered in Háskólabíó on 14 August 2009.

The documentary was filmed during the team's games in the UEFA Women's Euro 2009 qualifying.
