= Þorsteinn Halldórsson =

Icelandic footballer

Personal information
- Date of birth: 7 January 1968 (age 58)
- Position: Defender

Managerial career
- Years: Team
- 2021-: Iceland

Þorsteinn Halldórsson (born 7 January 1968) is an Icelandic football coach and former footballer. He has been coaching the Iceland women's national football team since 2021.

Þorsteinn was the coach of the Breiðablik Kópavogur women's team from October 2014. With his team, he won the Icelandic Championship in 2015, 2018 , and 2020, the Icelandic Cup in 2016 and 2018, and the Icelandic Super Cup in 2016, 2017, and 2019. In early 2021, he succeeded Jón Þór Hauksson as coach of the Icelandic women's national team. In the summer of 2022, his contract was extended until 2026. At the 2022 UEFA Women's Championship, Iceland drew all three of their group matches and were eliminated, finishing third in Group D.

He is the father of Jón Dagur Þorsteinsson.
