= Jón Þór Hauksson =

Icelandic footballer and coach

Personal information
- Date of birth: 2 May 1978 (age 48)
- Position: Midfielder

Team information
- Current team: ÍA (Manager)

Senior career*
Years	Team	Apps	(Gls)
1998	Skallagrímur	9	(1)
- ÍA
- Kári
- ÍA
2003	Afturelding	1	(0)
2007	Kári	3	(0)

Managerial career
- ÍA (assistant)
- 2017: ÍA
- 2017–2018: Stjarnan (assistant)
- 2018–2020: Iceland women
- 2021–2022: Vestri
- 2022–2025: ÍA
- 2025: Vestri
- * Club domestic league appearances and goals

Jón Þór Hauksson (born 2 May 1978) is an Icelandic football coach and former player. He was the manager of the Icelandic women's national team from 2018 to 2020. He was most recently the manager of Besta deild karla club Vestri.

== Managing career ==
Jón Þór started his coaching career as an assistant manager for ÍA. He served as the team's manager for six games in 2017 after the firing of manager Gunnlaugur Jónsson. After the season he was hired as an assistant manager of Stjarnan men's team where he won the Icelandic Cup in 2018.

In October 2018, Jón Þór was introduced as the new manager of the Icelandic women's national team. In December 2020, he guided the team to a berth at the UEFA Women's Euro 2022 after the team defeated Hungary 1–0. On 8 December 2020, the Football Association of Iceland announced that Jón Þór would step down as the manager of the national team, following remarks he made towards certain players in front of the whole team, while under the influence of alcohol, during its celebration of the victory against Hungary. In a statement released by Jón Þór, he acknowledged that he had crossed the line with his remarks as the celebration was neither the place nor time to make them and certainly not while under the influence of alcohol.

In July 2021, he was hired as the head coach of 1. deild karla club Vestri, replacing Heiðar Birnir Torleifsson who had resigned days earlier. Signing a contract until the end of the 2021 season, Jón Þór lead Vestri to a 5th place finish in the league. He also oversaw a strong performance in the Icelandic Cup, with Vestri reaching the semi-finals before losing to eventual champions Víkingur. On 15 October 2021, following the conclusion of the season and rumours around his future, Vestri announced on social media that Jón Þór had signed a new contract at the club. On 30 January 2022, Vestri announced that Jón Þór would be leaving his position as manager following an approach from ÍA. Jón Þór was confirmed as the new ÍA manager later that same evening, signing a three-year contract.
