= Pétur Georg Markan =

Icelandic theologian, politician and footballer

- Born: 16 February 1981 (age 45); Reykjavík, Iceland
- Occupations: Theologian, politician
- Political party: Liberal Reform Party; Social Democratic Alliance (formerly)
- Spouse: Margrét Lilja Vilmundardóttir
- Children: 4
Association football career
- Position: Forward
Senior career*
Years	Team	Apps	(Gls)
2002–2004	BÍ	33	(20)
2005–2008	Fjölnir	72	(24)
2009	Valur	15	(3)
2010	Fjölnir	21	(10)
2011	Víkingur	7	(1)
2011–2013	BÍ/Bolungarvík	28	(5)
2014–2018	Hörður	8	(2)
Total		183	(65)
- * Club domestic league appearances and goals

Pétur Georg Markan (born 16 February 1981) is an Icelandic theologian, politician and former footballer. He played for several seasons in the Icelandic top-tier Úrvalsdeild karla for Fjölnir, Valur and Víkingur. In 2013, he was a member of Alþingi for the Social Democratic Alliance.

Pétur was the mayor of Súðavík from 2014 to 2019 when he was hired as the communications manager of the Church of Iceland.

In April 2021, he left the Social Democratic Alliance after having been a member for 22 years and joined the Liberal Reform Party.

In April 2024, Pétur was hired as the mayor of Hveragerði, replacing Geir Sveinsson. In July 2026, he was hired as the mayor of Grindavík.

== Personal life ==
Pétur was born in Reykjavík, Iceland, and grew up inn Fossvogur. When he was 17 years old, Pétur's father died of lung cancer. He is married to Margrét Lilja Vilmundardóttir and together they have four children.
