= Jörundur Áki Sveinsson =

Icelandic footballer

Personal information
- Date of birth: 1 June 1971 (age 55)

Managerial career
- Years: Team
- 1997–1999: Fram
- 1997–1999: Fram (assistant)
- 2001–2003: Iceland women
- 2002–2003: Breiðablik
- 2005–2006: Iceland women
- 2005–2006: Stjarnan
- 2012–2014: BÍ/Bolungarvík

Jörundur Áki Sveinsson (born 1 June 1971) is an Icelandic football manager.
