= Participation of non-top flight clubs in UEFA club competitions =

The UEFA club competitions are several tournaments in which all UEFA affiliated teams can participate, including clubs from non-top flight leagues across Europe. This is the list of non-top flight clubs that played a match in any of the UEFA club competitions.

Only the 1960–61 and 2020–21 seasons saw no non-top flight clubs participate within UEFA club competitions.

== Results ==
List of non-top flight clubs competing in the UEFA club competitions
Season	UEFA Competition(s)	League tier	Non-top flight club	First round entered	Final round reached
1961–62	Cup Winners' Cup	Football League Second Division (Tier 2)	(Wales) Swansea Town	Preliminary round	
1962–63	Cup Winners' Cup	Cheshire County League (Tier 6)	(Wales) Bangor City F.C.	First round	
1962–63	Cup Winners' Cup	French Division 2 (Tier 2)	(France) Saint-Étienne	First round	Second round
1963–64	Cup Winners' Cup	Welsh League North (Tier 2)	(Wales) Borough United	First round	Second round
1963–64	Cup Winners' Cup	Eerste Divisie (Tier 2)	(Netherlands) Willem II Tilburg	First round	
1964–65	Cup Winners' Cup	Football League Second Division (Tier 2)	(Wales) Cardiff City	First round	Quarter-finals
1965–66	Cup Winners' Cup	Football League Second Division (Tier 2)	(Wales) Cardiff City (2)	First round	
1965–66	Cup Winners' Cup	Norwegian First Division (Tier 2)	(Norway) Rosenborg BK	First round	Second round
1966–67	Cup Winners' Cup	Slovak National Football League (Tier 2)	(Czechoslovakia) 1. FC Tatran Prešov	First round	
1966–67	Cup Winners' Cup	Football League Third Division (Tier 3)	(Wales) Swansea City (2)	First round	
1967–68	Cup Winners' Cup	Danish 1st Division (Tier 2)	(Denmark) Randers Sportsklub Freja	First round	
1967–68	Cup Winners' Cup	Football League Second Division (Tier 2)	(Wales) Cardiff City (3)	First round	Semi-finals
1968–69	Cup Winners' Cup	Football League Second Division (Tier 2)	(Wales) Cardiff City (4)	First round	
1968–69	Cup Winners' Cup	Danish 1st Division (Tier 2)	(Denmark) Randers Sportsklub Freja (2)	First round	Quarter-finals
1969–70	Cup Winners' Cup	Norwegian First Division (Tier 2)	(Norway) Mjøndalen IF	First round	
1969–70	Cup Winners' Cup	Football League Second Division (Tier 2)	(Wales) Cardiff City (5)	First round	Second round
1970–71	Cup Winners' Cup	Soviet First League (Tier 2)	(Soviet Union) Karpaty Lviv	First round	
1970–71	Cup Winners' Cup	Football League Second Division (Tier 2)	(Wales) Cardiff City (6)	First round	Quarter-finals
1971–72	Cup Winners' Cup	Football League Second Division (Tier 2)	(Wales) Cardiff City (7)	First round	
1971–72	Cup Winners' Cup	Luxembourg Division of Honour (Tier 2)	(Luxembourg) Jeunesse Hautcharage	First round	
1971–72	Cup Winners' Cup	Czech National Football League (Tier 2)	(Czechoslovakia) Skoda Plzen	First round	
1972–73	Cup Winners' Cup	Danish 1st Division (Tier 2)	(Denmark) Fremad Amager	First round	
1972–73	Cup Winners' Cup	Football League Third Division (Tier 3)	(Wales) Wrexham	First round	Second round
1973–74	Cup Winners' Cup	Football League Second Division (Tier 2)	(Wales) Cardiff City (8)	First round	
1973–74	Cup Winners' Cup	Football League Second Division (Tier 2)	(England) Sunderland	First round	Second round
1973–74	Cup Winners' Cup	Divizia B (Tier 2)	(Romania) Chimia Râmnicu Vâlcea	First round	
1974–75	Cup Winners' Cup	Football League Second Division (Tier 2)	(Wales) Cardiff City (9)	First round	
1975–76	Cup Winners' Cup	Yugoslav Second League (Tier 2)	(Socialist Federal Republic of Yugoslavia) FK Borac Banja Luka	First round	Second round
1975–76	Cup Winners' Cup	Football League Third Division (Tier 3)	(Wales) Wrexham (2)	First round	Quarter-finals
1976–77	Cup Winners' Cup	Football League Second Division (Tier 2)	(Wales) Cardiff City (10)	Qualifying round	First round
1976–77	Cup Winners' Cup	Divizia B (Tier 2)	(Romania) CSU Dunărea de Jos Galați	First round	
1976–77	Cup Winners' Cup	Norwegian First Division (Tier 2)	(Norway) FK Bodø/Glimt	First round	
1976–77	Cup Winners' Cup	Irish League B Division (Tier 2)	(Northern Ireland) Carrick Rangers	First round	Second round
1976–77	Cup Winners' Cup	Football League Second Division (Tier 2)	(England) Southampton	First round	Quarter-finals
1977–78	Cup Winners' Cup	Football League Second Division (Tier 2)	(Wales) Cardiff City (11)	First round	
1978–79	Cup Winners' Cup	Football League Second Division (Tier 2)	(Wales) Wrexham (3)	First round	
1979–80	Cup Winners' Cup	2. Liga (Tier 2)	(Austria) Wacker Innsbruck	First round	
1979–80	Cup Winners' Cup	Football League Second Division (Tier 2)	(Wales) Wrexham (4)	First round	
1980–81	Cup Winners' Cup	Segunda División (Tier 2)	(Spain) Castilla CF	First round	
1980–81	Cup Winners' Cup	Norwegian First Division (Tier 2)	(Norway) SK Haugar	First round	Second round
1980–81	Cup Winners' Cup	Football League Third Division (Tier 3)	(Wales) Newport County	First round	Quarter-finals
1980–81	Cup Winners' Cup	Football League Second Division (Tier 2)	(England) West Ham United	First round	Quarter-finals
1981–82	Cup Winners' Cup	Soviet First League (Tier 2)	(Soviet Union) SKA Rostov-on-Don	First round	Second round
1982–83	Cup Winners' Cup	Divizia B (Tier 2)	(Romania) Baia Mare	First round	
1983–84	Cup Winners' Cup	Football League Second Division (Tier 2)	(Wales) Swansea City (3)	Preliminary round	
1983–84	Cup Winners' Cup	II Liga (Tier 2)	(Poland) Lechia Gdańsk	First round	
1983–84	Cup Winners' Cup	Eerste Divisie (Tier 2)	(Netherlands) NEC Nijmegen	First round	Second round
1984–85	Cup Winners' Cup	Football League Fourth Division (Tier 4)	(Wales) Wrexham (5)	First round	Second round
1985–86	Cup Winners' Cup	Norwegian First Division (Tier 2)	(Norway) Fredrikstad FK	First round	
1985–86	Cup Winners' Cup	Northern Premier League (Tier 6)	(Wales) Bangor City (2)	First round	Second round
1986–87	Cup Winners' Cup	Football League Fourth Division (Tier 4)	(Wales) Wrexham (6)	First round	Second round
1987–88	Cup Winners' Cup	Southern Football League Midland Division (Tier 7)	(Wales) Merthyr Tydfil	First round	
1987–88	Cup Winners' Cup	Superettan (Tier 2)	(Norway) Kalmar FF	First round	Second round
1987–88	Cup Winners' Cup	Serie B (Tier 2)	(Italy) Atalanta	Second round	Semi-finals
1988–89	Cup Winners' Cup	Yugoslav Second League (Tier 2)	(Socialist Federal Republic of Yugoslavia) FK Borac Banja Luka (2)	First round	
1988–89	Cup Winners' Cup	2. Liga (Tier 2)	(Austria) Kremser SC	First round	
1988–89	Cup Winners' Cup	Football League Third Division (Tier 3)	(Wales) Cardiff City (12)	First round	Second round
1989–90	Cup Winners' Cup	Football League Third Division (Tier 3)	(Wales) Swansea City (4)	First round	
1990–91	Cup Winners' Cup	League of Ireland First Division (Tier 2)	(Republic of Ireland) Bray Wanderers	Preliminary round	
1990–91	Cup Winners' Cup	2. Bundesliga (Tier 2)	(East Germany) PSV Schwerin	First round	
1991–92	Cup Winners' Cup	2. Liga (Tier 2)	(Austria) SV Stockerau	Qualifying round	
1991–92	Cup Winners' Cup	Regionalliga (Tier 3)	(Germany) Eisenhüttenstädter FC Stahl	First round	
1991–92	Cup Winners' Cup	Football League Third Division (Tier 3)	(Wales) Cardiff City (13)	First round	
1991–92	UEFA Cup	2. Bundesliga (Tier 2)	(Germany) Hallescher FC	First round	
1991–92	UEFA Cup	2. Bundesliga (Tier 2)	(Germany) Rot-Weiß Erfurt	First round	Second round
1992–93	Cup Winners' Cup	Norwegian First Division (Tier 2)	(Norway) Strømsgodset IF	Qualifying round	
1992–93	Cup Winners' Cup	1. Liga Classic (Tier 4)	(Liechtenstein) Vaduz	Qualifying round	
1992–93	Cup Winners' Cup	Football League Third Division (Tier 3)	(Wales) Cardiff City (14)	First round	
1992–93	Cup Winners' Cup	2. Bundesliga (Tier 2)	(Germany) Hannover 96	First round	
1992–93	Cup Winners' Cup	I Liga (Tier 2)	(Poland) Miedź Legnica	First round	
1993–94	Cup Winners' Cup	3. Liga (Tier 5)	(Liechtenstein) Balzers	Qualifying round	First round
1993–94	Cup Winners' Cup	Football League Division Two (Tier 2)	(Wales) Cardiff City (15)	First round	
1994–95	UEFA Cup	Ligue 2 (Tier 2)	(France) Olympique de Marseille	First round	Second round
1995–96	Cup Winners' Cup	Yugoslav Second League (Tier 2)	(Socialist Federal Republic of Yugoslavia) FK Obilić	Qualifying round	
1995–96	Cup Winners' Cup	1. Liga Classic (Tier 4)	(Liechtenstein) Vaduz (2)	Qualifying round	
1995–96	Cup Winners' Cup	Football League Second Division (Tier 3)	(Wales) Wrexham (7)	First round	
1996–97	Cup Winners' Cup	1. Liga Classic (Tier 4)	(Liechtenstein) Vaduz (3)	Qualifying round	First round
1996–97	Cup Winners' Cup	2. Bundesliga (Tier 2)	(Germany) 1. FC Kaiserslautern	First round	
1996–97	Cup Winners' Cup	Championnat National (Tier 3)	(France) Nîmes Olympique	First round	Second round
1997–98	Cup Winners' Cup	3. Liga (Tier 5)	(Liechtenstein) Balzers (2)	Qualifying round	
1997–98	Cup Winners' Cup	Ligue 2 (Tier 2)	(France) OGC Nice	First round	Second round
1998–99	Cup Winners' Cup	1. Liga Classic (Tier 4)	(Liechtenstein) Vaduz (4)	Qualifying round	
1999–2000	UEFA Cup	League of Ireland First Division (Tier 2)	(Republic of Ireland) Bray Wanderers (2)	Qualifying round	
1999–2000	UEFA Cup	1. Liga Classic (Tier 4)	(Liechtenstein) Vaduz (5)	Qualifying round	
1999–2000	UEFA Cup	Liga Portugal 2 (Tier 2)	(Portugal) Beira-Mar	First round	
2000–01	UEFA Cup	1. Liga Classic (Tier 3)	(Liechtenstein) Vaduz (6)	Qualifying round	
2000–01	UEFA Cup	Ligue 2 (Tier 2)	(France) Guegnon	First round	
2001–02	UEFA Cup	Swiss Challenge League (Tier 2)	(Liechtenstein) Vaduz (7)	Qualifying round	
2001–02	UEFA Cup	Ligue 2 (Tier 2)	(France) RC Strasbourg Alsace	First round	
2001–02	UEFA Cup	2. Bundesliga (Tier 2)	(Germany) 1. FC Union Berlin	First round	Second round
2002–03	UEFA Cup	League of Ireland First Division (Tier 2)	(Republic of Ireland) Dundalk	Qualifying round	
2002–03	UEFA Cup	Swiss Challenge League (Tier 2)	(Switzerland) Lugano	Qualifying round	
2002–03	UEFA Cup	Swiss Challenge League (Tier 2)	(Liechtenstein) Vaduz (8)	Qualifying round	
2002–03	UEFA Cup	Ligue 2 (Tier 2)	(France) Lorient	First round	
2002–03	UEFA Cup	Liga Portugal 2 (Tier 2)	(Portugal) Leixões	First round	
2002–03	UEFA Cup	Football League First Division (Tier 2)	(England) Ipswich Town	Preliminary round	Second round
2003–04	UEFA Cup	Swiss Challenge League (Tier 2)	(Liechtenstein) Vaduz (9)	Qualifying round	
2003–04	UEFA Cup	Liga Leumit (Tier 2)	(Israel) Hapoel Ramat Gan Givatayim	First round	
2004–05	UEFA Cup	Superettan (Tier 2)	(Sweden) Östers IF	First qualifying round	Second qualifying round
2004–05	UEFA Cup	Swiss Challenge League (Tier 2)	(Liechtenstein) Vaduz (10)	First qualifying round	Second qualifying round
2004–05	UEFA Cup	Second League of Serbia and Montenegro (Tier 2)	(Serbia and Montenegro) Budućnost Banatski Dvor	Second qualifying round	
2004–05	UEFA Cup	Superettan (Tier 2)	(Sweden) Östers IF	Second qualifying round	
2004–05	UEFA Cup	Ligue 2 (Tier 2)	(France) LB Châteauroux	First round	
2004–05	UEFA Cup	Football League Championship (Tier 2)	(England) Millwall	First round	
2004–05	UEFA Cup	Russian First League (Tier 2)	(Russia) Terek Groznyi	First round	
2004–05	UEFA Cup	2. Bundesliga (Tier 2)	(Germany) Alemannia Aachen	First round	Round of 32
2005–06	UEFA Cup	Beta Ethniki (Tier 2)	(Greece) Aris Thessaloniki	First round	
2006–07	UEFA Cup	Superettan (Tier 2)	(Sweden) Åtvidabergs FF	First qualifying round	Second qualifying round
2006–07	UEFA Cup	Swiss Challenge League (Tier 2)	(Liechtenstein) Vaduz (11)	First qualifying round	Second qualifying round
2006–07	UEFA Cup	Scottish Second Division (Tier 3)	(Scotland) Gretna	Second qualifying round	
2007–08	UEFA Cup	Scottish First Division (Tier 2)	(Scotland) Dunfermline Athletic	Second qualifying round	
2007–08	UEFA Cup	Superettan (Tier 2)	(Sweden) BK Häcken	First qualifying round	First round
2008–09	UEFA Cup	Scottish Football League First Division (Tier 2)	(Scotland) Queen of the South	Second qualifying round	
2009–10	Europa League	II Lyga (Tier 3)	(Lithuania) FBK Kaunas	Second qualifying round	
2009–10	Europa League	Swiss Challenge League (Tier 2)	(Liechtenstein) Vaduz (12)	Second qualifying round	Third qualifying round
2009–10	Europa League	Prva Liga (Tier 2)	(Serbia) FK Sevojno	Second qualifying round	Third qualifying round
2009–10	Europa League	Ligue 2 (Tier 2)	(France) En Avant Guingamp	Play-off round	
2010–11	Europa League	Swiss Challenge League (Tier 2)	(Liechtenstein) Vaduz (13)	Second qualifying round	
2010–11	Europa League	Swiss Challenge League (Tier 2)	(Switzerland) Lausanne-Sport	Second qualifying round	Group stage
2011–12	Europa League	Erovnuli Liga 2 (Tier 2)	(Georgia (country)) Gagra	Second qualifying round	
2011–12	Europa League	Swiss Challenge League (Tier 2)	(Liechtenstein) Vaduz (14)	Second qualifying round	Third qualifying round
2011–12	Europa League	EFL Championship (Tier 2)	(England) Birmingham City	Group stage	
2012–13	Europa League	1. Liga Classic (Tier 4)	(Liechtenstein) USV Eschen/Mauren	First qualifying round	
2013–14	Europa League	Macedonian Second Football League (Tier 2)	(North Macedonia) Teteks	First qualifying round	
2013–14	Europa League	Swiss Challenge League (Tier 2)	(Liechtenstein) Vaduz (15)	First qualifying round	
2013–14	Europa League	Norwegian First Division (Tier 2)	(Norway) Hødd	Second qualifying round	
2013–14	Europa League	Liga Leumit (Tier 2)	(Israel) Hapoel Ramat Gan Givatayim (2)	Third qualifying round	
2013–14	Europa League	Regionalliga Mitte (Tier 3)	(Austria) Pasching	Play-off round	
2013–14	Europa League	EFL Championship (Tier 2)	(England) Wigan Athletic	Group stage	
2014–15	Europa League	Esiliiga B (Tier 3)	(Estonia) Santos Tartu	First qualifying round	
2014–15	Europa League	1. divisjon (Tier 2)	(Norway) Tromsø IL	First qualifying round	Third qualifying round
2014–15	Europa League	Austrian Football Second League (Tier 2)	(Austria) SKN St. Pölten	Second qualifying round	Third qualifying round
2015–16	Europa League	Eerste Divisie (Tier 2)	(Netherlands) Go Ahead Eagles	First qualifying round	
2015–16	Europa League	League of Ireland First Division (Tier 2)	(Republic of Ireland) University College Dublin	Second qualifying round	
2016–17	Europa League	Scottish Football League First Division (Tier 2)	(Scotland) Hibernian	Second qualifying round	
2016–17	Europa League	Swiss Challenge League (Tier 2)	(Switzerland) Zürich	Group stage	
2017–18	Europa League	Swiss Challenge League (Tier 2)	(Liechtenstein) Vaduz (16)	First qualifying round	Second qualifying round
2018–19	Europa League	Kategoria e Parë (Tier 2)	(Albania) Tirana	First qualifying round	
2018–19	Europa League	Swiss Challenge League (Tier 2)	(Liechtenstein) Vaduz (17)	First qualifying round	Second qualifying round
2019–20	Europa League	Swiss Challenge League (Tier 2)	(Liechtenstein) Vaduz (18)	First qualifying round	Second qualifying round
2021–22	Europa Conference League	Erovnuli Liga 2 (Tier 2)	(Georgia (country)) Gagra (2)	First qualifying round	
2021–22	Europa Conference League	Macedonian Second Football League (Tier 2)	(North Macedonia) Sileks	First qualifying round	
2021–22	Europa Conference League	Swiss Challenge League (Tier 2)	(Liechtenstein) Vaduz (19)	Second qualifying round	
2022–23	Europa Conference League	Swiss Challenge League (Tier 2)	(Liechtenstein) Vaduz (20)	Second qualifying round	Group stage
2023–24	Europa Conference League	Swiss Challenge League (Tier 2)	(Liechtenstein) Vaduz (21)	First qualifying round	
2024–25	Europa League	Liga II (Tier 2)	(Romania) Corvinul Hunedoara	First qualifying round	Second qualifying round
2024–25	Europa League	I Liga (Tier 2)	(Poland) Wisła Kraków	First qualifying round	Second qualifying round
2024–25	Conference League	Swiss Challenge League (Tier 2)	(Liechtenstein) Vaduz (22)	Second qualifying round	
2024–25	Conference League	Liga II (Tier 2)	(Romania) Corvinul Hunedoara	Third qualifying round	
2024–25	Conference League	I Liga (Tier 2)	(Poland) Wisła Kraków	Third qualifying round	Play-off round
2025–26	Conference League	Erovnuli Liga 2 (Tier 2)	(Georgia (country)) Spaeri	Second qualifying round	
2025–26	Conference League	Swiss Challenge League (Tier 2)	(Liechtenstein) Vaduz (23)	Second qualifying round	Third qualifying round
2026–27	Europa League	1. deild karla (Tier 2)	(Iceland) Vestri	First qualifying round	
2026–27	Europa League	Liga Portugal 2 (Tier 2)	(Portugal) Torreense	League phase	TBD
