= Pape Mamadou Faye =

Icelandic footballer

Personal information
- Date of birth: 21 March 1991 (age 35)
- Place of birth: Dakar, Senegal
- Position: Striker

Youth career
- Fylkir

Senior career*
Years	Team	Apps	(Gls)
2007-2010	Fylkir	38	(5)
2011	Leiknir	19	(9)
2012	Grindavík	17	(6)
2013-2015	Víkingur Reykjavík	44	(14)
2015	BÍ/Bolungarvík	10	(5)
2016-2018	Víkingur Ólafsvík	45	(6)
2018	TB/FCS/Royn	11	(5)
2019	Þróttur Vogum	15	(5)
2021	Tindastóll	21	(13)
2022	Árbær	16	(9)

International career^{‡}
2008	Iceland U18	3	(0)
2009	Iceland U19	5	(4)
- * Club domestic league appearances and goals as of 6 December 2022 (UTC) ‡ National team caps and goals as of 6 December 2022 (UTC)

Pape Mamadou Faye (born 21 March 1991) is an Icelandic former footballer who played as a striker. Born in Senegal, he represented Iceland internationally.

== Early life ==
Pape was born in Dakar, Senegal but moved to Iceland when he was eleven years old. In his youth, he played basketball with Valur. When his family moved to Árbær, he started playing football with Fylkir.

== Club career ==
Pape played his first senior team game with Fylkir in the Úrvalsdeild karla in 2007. In September 2010, Fylkir terminated its contract with Pape due to disciplinary reasons. He spent the 2011 season with Leiknir in the second-tier 1. deild karla before signing with top-tier club Grindavík for the 2012 season. After Grindavík was relegated, he signed with Víkingur Reykjavík in 2013 and played there for two and a half season. In July 2015, he was sold to BÍ/Bolungarvík.

In 2016, Pape signed with Víkingur Ólafsvík where he played for two and a half season. After initially planning on joining Kórdrengir in 2018, he eventually returned to Víkingur Ólafsvík and appeared in 5 matches in the Úrvalsdeild, scoring one goal. In end of June he transferred to TB/FCS/Royn, where he appeared in 11 matches in the Faroe Islands Premier League and scored 5 goals. In May 2019, Pape joined Þróttur Vogum.

After sitting out the 2020 season due to injuries, Pape signed with Tindastóll in May 2021. In 21 matches, he netted 13 goals, tied for third best in the 3. deild. Despite his scoring prowess, Tindastóll was relegated after a loss in their final game of the season.

In April 2022, Faye joined Árbær.

== National team career ==
Pape played three games for the Iceland U18 team in 2008 and 5 games for the Iceland U19 the following year. On 7 September 2009, he scored two goals in a friendly against Scotland U-19.
