= Nicolaj Madsen =

Danish footballer (born 1988)

Personal information
- Date of birth: 16 July 1988 (age 38)
- Place of birth: Haslev, Denmark
- Height: 1.86 m (6 ft 1 in)
- Position: Midfielder

Youth career
- Haslev FC
- Herfølge

Senior career*
Years	Team	Apps	(Gls)
2006–2009	Herfølge	29	(4)
2009–2013	HB Køge	55	(5)
2013–2017	SønderjyskE	120	(17)
2017–2018	Vejle	30	(3)
2018	HB Køge	7	(1)
2019–2021	SpVgg Unterhaching	0	(0)
2019–2020	→ 1860 Rosenheim (loan)	12	(0)
2021–2023	Vestri	39	(11)
2022	→ HB Køge (loan)	0	(0)
- * Club domestic league appearances and goals as of 20:15, 29 September 2022 (UTC)

Nicolaj Madsen (born 16 July 1988) is a Danish former professional footballer who played as a midfielder.

== Club career ==
On 31 August 2018, Madsen left Vejle Boldklub and returned to HB Køge in October 2018 on a contract for the rest of the year.

On 2 September 2019 it was confirmed, that Madsen had joined German club SpVgg Unterhaching and would play on loan at TSV 1860 Rosenheim for the 2019–20 season.

Madsen moved to Icelandic 1. deild club Vestri on 12 February 2021, signing alongside compatriot Casper Gandrup. He returned to HB Køge on a short loan in January 2022, but returned to Vestri in March 2022.

On 10 March 2023, Vestri confirmed that Madsen had left the club due to personal issues. He later spoke publicly about the period surrounding his departure, describing how he had experienced anxiety and suicidal thoughts, and recalling the nights as particularly difficult: "The thoughts were racing. I was lonely, and I felt life was meaningless. I had anxiety about the dark, and I could be afraid of my own breathing." He credited support from Spillerforeningen and a psychologist with helping him through the period. Madsen has not played a professional match since leaving Vestri.
