= Gilles Mbang Ondo =

Gabonese footballer

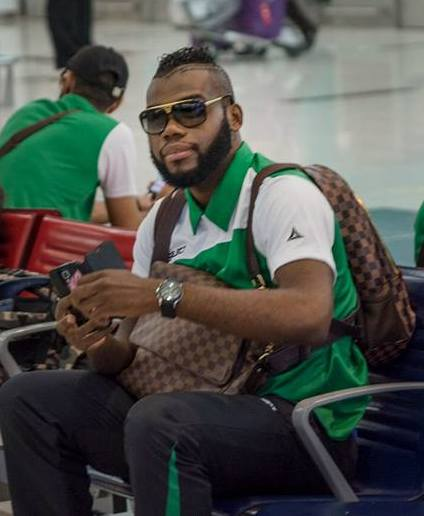

Personal information
- Full name: Gilles Daniel Mbang Ondo
- Date of birth: 10 October 1985 (age 41)
- Place of birth: Libreville, Gabon
- Height: 1.89 m (6 ft 2 in)
- Position: Forward

Youth career
- 1995–1999: Sens
- 1999–2003: Paris Saint-Germain Academy
- 2003–2005: Auxerre

Senior career*
Years	Team	Apps	(Gls)
2005–2007	Auxerre B	9	(1)
2007–2008	SC Eisenstadt	13	(4)
2008–2010	Grindavík	50	(28)
2011	Stabæk	25	(4)
2012	Sandnes Ulf	13	(2)
2013	Al-Nejmeh	9	(4)
2013–2014	Al-Taawon	21	(15)
2014–2015	Ras Al-Khaimah	9	(3)
2015	Dibba Al-Hisn	10	(5)
2015	Al-Nahda	3	(1)
2016–2017	UE Engordany	6	(6)
2017	Vestri	14	(5)
2018–2019	Selfoss	12	(4)
2019	Þróttur Vogum	17	(8)
2019–2020	Is-Selongey	8	(2)
Total		219	(92)

International career
2007–2010	Gabon	5	(0)
- * Club domestic league appearances and goals

Gilles Daniel Mbang Ondo (born 10 October 1985) is a Gabonese former footballer who played as a forward.

== Club career ==
=== Youth career ===
Born in Libreville, Gabon, Mbang Ondo, when he was 10 months old, moved along with his family to Paris, France. He began his footballing career in 1995 at the age of 9 with Sens-based, FC Sens. In 1999, he moved back to Paris where he began playing for the Paris Saint-Germain Academy till 2003. He then moved to Auxerre, where he played for the U-18 and U-21 teams of Ligue 1 club, AJ Auxerre. He also made an appearance for the Auxerre-based club's reserve squad in the 2005–06 season of Championnat de France Amateur and helped his side secure the 3rd position in the Group A of the competition.

=== SC Eisenstadt ===
Mbang Ondo first moved out of France in 2007 to Austria where on 1 July 2007, he signed a six-month contract with Austrian Regional League club, SC Eisenstadt. He scored 4 goals in 13 appearances in the 2007–08 season of the Austrian Regional League for the Eisenstadt-based club.

=== Grindavík ===
In 2008, he again made a move out of France and this time to Iceland where on 1 January 2008, he signed a three-year contract with Úrvalsdeild karla club, Grindavík. He scored his first Úrvalsdeild goal on 27 July 2008 in a 5–3 loss against Valur. He scored 3 goals in 9 appearances in the 2008 Úrvalsdeild.

He made his first appearance and scored his first goal in the 2009 Úrvalsdeild on 10 May 2009 in a 3–1 loss against Stjarnan. He also made his debut and scored his first goal in the Icelandic Cup on 18 June 2009 in the third round of the 2009 Icelandic Cup in a 3–1 win over Íþróttabandalag Akraness. All the three goals for the Grindavík-based club came from Mbang Ondo. He scored 11 goals in 21 appearances in the 2009 Úrvalsdeild and thus winning the Grindavík Player of the Year award in 2009.

In the 2010 Úrvalsdeild, he made his first appearance on 11 May 2010 in a 4–0 loss against Stjarnan and scored his first goal on 25 May 2010 in a 2–1 loss against Valur. He also made an appearance in the fourth round of the 2010 Icelandic Cup on 24 June 2010 in a 1–1 draw against Knattspyrnufélag Akureyrar which was later won by the Akureyri-based club 5–4 on penalties. Mbang Ondo successfully converted the fourth penalty for his side in the penalty shootout but his side failed to pull out a win against Akureyri-based club. He scored 14 goals in 20 appearances in the 2010 Úrvalsdeild, thus finishing as the top scorer of the 2010 edition of the first-tier Iceland and sharing the award with, Iceland internationals, Alfreð Finnbogason and Atli Viðar Björnsson and also ending his three-year long spell with the Grindavík-based club. He also won the Grindavík Player of the Year award for a second consecutive year in a row and also received the Player of the Year Award from the Football Association of Iceland in his final season with the Grindavík-based club.

=== Stabæk ===
In 2011, Mbang Ondo moved to Norway where on 1 January 2011, he signed a one-year contract with Bærum-based, Stabæk Football Club. He made his Tippeligaen debut on 20 March 2011 in a 7–0 loss against Lillestrøm SK and scored his first goal on 3 April 2011 in a 2–1 win over Rosenborg BK. He also made his Norwegian Football Cup debut on 1 May 2011 in the first round of the competition in a 1–0 win over Holmlia SK. He scored 1 goal in 3 appearances in the 2011 Norwegian Football Cup and 4 goals in 25 appearances in the 2011 Tippeligaen for the Bærum-based club.

=== Sandnes Ulf ===
On 1 January 2012, Mbang Ondo signed a six-month contract with another Tippeligaen club, Sandnes Ulf. He made his first appearance for the club and scored his first goal on 26 March 2012 in a 2–2 draw against Viking FK. He scored 2 goals in 13 appearances in the 2012 Tippeligaen.

=== Al-Nejmeh ===
In January 2013, Mbang Ondo again moved out of France and this time to West Asia and more accurately to Lebanon where he signed a six-month contract with Al-Nejmeh SC. He made his Lebanese Premier League debut and scored his first goal on 16 February 2013 in a 3–2 win over Shabab Al-Ghazieh. He scored 4 goals in 9 appearances in the 2012–13 Lebanese Premier League and helped his side secure the 2nd position in the competition and also helped them earn a spot in the 2014 AFC Cup.

=== Al-Taawon ===
In late 2013, Mbang Ondo again made a move out of France and this time to the Middle East and more accurately to the United Arab Emirates where he signed a one-year contract with Ras al-Khaimah-based, Al-Taawon C.S. Club. He made his UAE First Division debut and scored his first goal on 9 November 2013 in a 6–1 loss against Fujairah-based, Al-Oruba. He scored 15 goals in 21 appearances in the 2013–14 edition of the competition which also included a hat-trick on 20 March 2014 in a 3–0 win over Al-Rams Club.

=== Ras Al-Khaimah ===
He then moved to another UAE First Division and Ras al-Khaimah-based club, Ras Al-Khaimah. He made his club debut in a UAE League Cup match on 11 October 2014 in a 4–1 loss against Dubai-based, Dubai CSC and scored his first goal on 31 October 2014 in a 2–1 loss against Al-Thaid in the same competition. He made his first appearance in the 2014–15 UAE First Division on 15 November 2014 in a 2–0 loss against Al-Shaab CSC and scored his first goal in the 2014–15 edition of the competition on 22 November 2014 in a 1–1 draw against Dibba Club. He scored 1 goal in 3 appearances in the 2014–15 UAE Arabian Gulf Cup and 3 goals in 9 appearances in the 2014–15 UAE First Division for the Ras al-Khaimah-based club.

=== Dibba Al-Hisn ===
In January 2015, he moved to Dibba Al-Hisn where he signed a six-month contract with another UAE First Division club, Dibba Al-Hisn Sports Club. He made his club debut and scored his first goal on 20 February 2015 in a 2–2 draw against Masafi Club. He scored 5 goals in 10 appearances in the 2014–15 UAE First Division for the Dibba Al-Hisn-based club and thus took his tally to 8 goals in the 2014–15 edition of the competition.

=== Al-Nahda ===
In September 2015, Mbang Ondo again made a move out of France to the Middle East and this time to Oman where on 22 September 2015, he signed a one-year contract with Al-Nahda Club. He made his debut for the club on 1 October 2015 in a 2–0 win over Al-Khaboura SC in the 2015–16 Oman Professional League Cup and scored his first goal in the same competition on 11 October 2015 in a 4–3 win over Sohar SC. He made his Oman Professional League and scored his first goal in the competition on debut on 18 October 2015 in a 2–1 win over Muscat Club.

=== Þróttur Vogum ===
After one season with UMF Selfoss, Mbang Ondo joined Þróttur Vogum in April 2019.

== International career ==
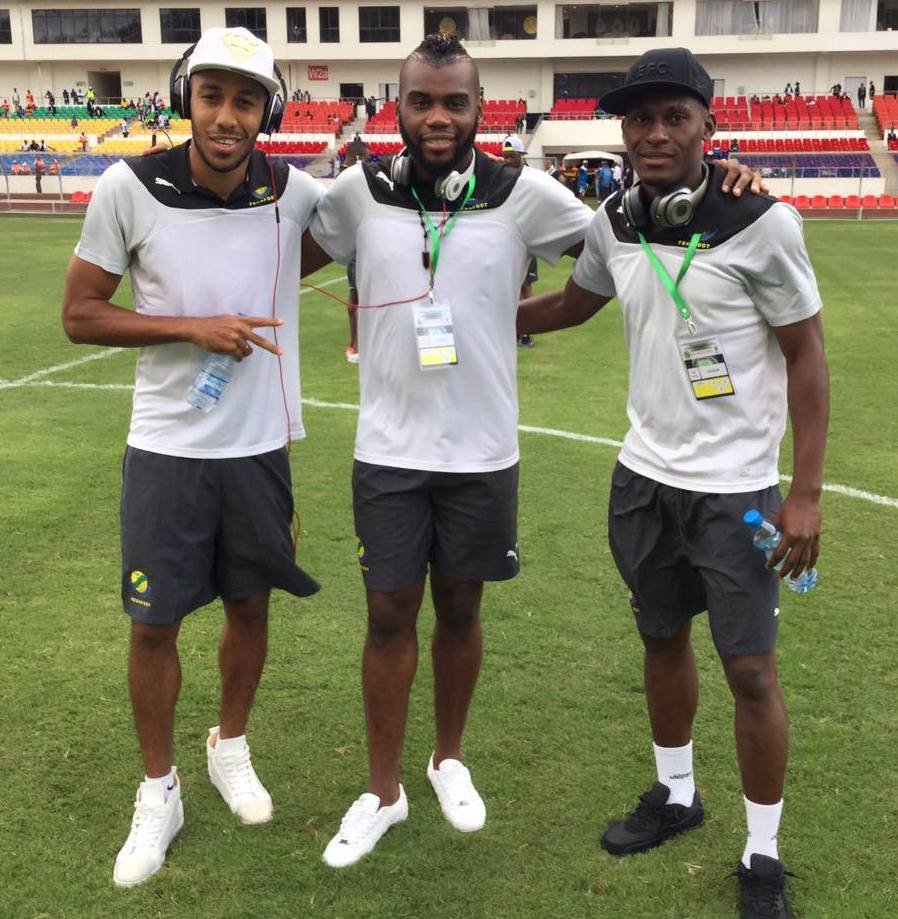
Gilles Mbang Ondo, Pierre-Emerick Aubameyang and Johann Lengoualama - Gabon

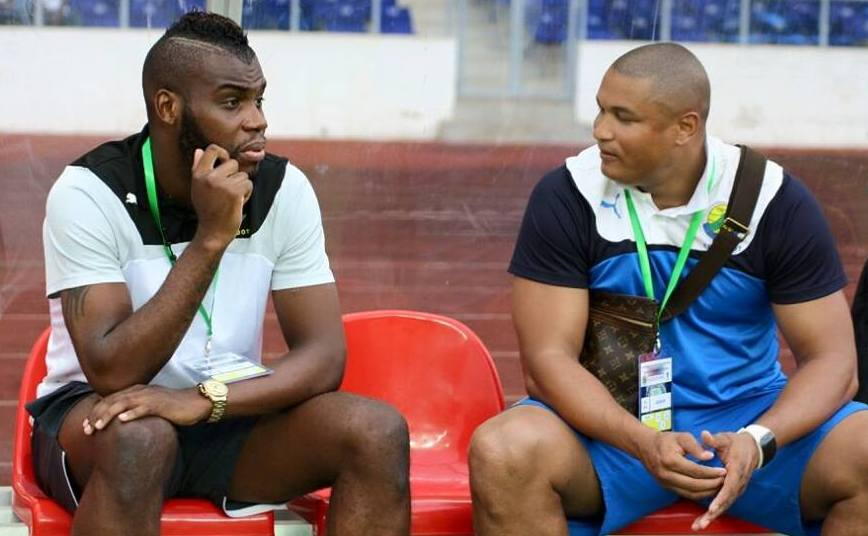
Gilles Mbang Ondo and Daniel Cousin - Gabon

Mbang Ondo was part of the first team squad of the Gabon national team. He was selected for the national team for the first time in 2007. He made his debut and scored his first goal for the Black Panthers in a friendly match on 12 June 2007 in a 3–0 win over Réunion. He made his FIFA official debut for the national side in a 2010 FIFA World Cup qualification match on 7 September 2008 in a 3–0 win over Lesotho.

== Personal life ==
Mbang Ondo shares a dual-citizenship between Gabon and France. His younger brother is footballer Loïc Mbang Ondo.

== Career statistics ==
=== Club ===
Appearances and goals by club, season and competition
Club	Season	League			Cup		Continental		Other		Total	
Club	Season	Division	Apps	Goals	Apps	Goals	Apps	Goals	Apps	Goals	Apps	Goals
Auxerre B	2005–06	Championnat de France Amateur	1	0	0	0	0	0	0	0	1	0
SC Eisenstadt	2007–08	Austrian Regional League	13	4	0	0	0	0	0	0	13	4
Grindavík	2008	Úrvalsdeild	9	3	0	0	0	0	0	0	9	3
Grindavík	2009	Úrvalsdeild	21	11	1	3	0	0	0	0	22	14
Grindavík	2010	Úrvalsdeild	20	14	1	0	0	0	0	0	20	14
Grindavík	Total		50	28	2	3	0	0	0	0	51	31
Stabæk	2011	Tippeligaen	25	4	3	1	0	0	0	0	28	5
Sandnes Ulf	2012	Tippeligaen	13	2	0	0	0	0	0	0	13	2
Al-Nejmeh	2012–13	Lebanese Premier League	9	4	0	0	0	0	0	0	9	4
Al-Taawon	2013–14	UAE First Division League	21	15	0	0	0	0	0	0	21	15
Ras Al-Khaimah	2014–15	UAE First Division League	9	3	3	1	0	0	0	0	12	4
Dibba Al-Hisn	2014–15	UAE First Division	10	5	0	0	0	0	0	0	10	5
Al-Nahda	2015–16	Oman Professional League	3	1	3	2	0	0	0	0	6	3
Engordany	2016–17	Primera Divisió	6	6	0	0	0	0	0	0	6	6
Vestri	2017–18	2. deild karla	15	5	0	0	0	0	0	0	15	5
Career total			175	77	11	7	0	0	0	0	186	84

=== International ===
Scores and results list Gabon's goal tally first.

#	Date	Venue	Opponent	Score	Result	Competition
1.	12 June 2007		Réunion		3–0	Friendly

== Honours ==
Al-Nejmeh

  - Lebanese Premier League: Runner-up 2012–13

Individual

- Úrvalsdeild top scorer: 2010
- Úrvalsdeild Player of the Year: 2010
- Grindavík Player of the Year : 2009, 2010
