= Sandra Adolfsson =

Swedish footballer (born 1987)

Sandra Lynn
Personal information
- Full name: Sandra Monica Lynn
- Date of birth: 13 June 1987 (age 39)
- Place of birth: Malmö, Sweden
- Height: 1.74 m (5 ft 9 in)
- Positions: Defender; midfielder

Team information
- Current team: Vittsjö GIK
- Number: 22

Senior career*
Years	Team	Apps	(Gls)
2004–2009	Husie IF	16	(19)
2010–	Vittsjö GIK	181	(22)

International career^{‡}
2018–	Sweden	5	(0)
- * Club domestic league appearances and goals as of 01:05, 16 July 2020 (UTC) ‡ National team caps and goals as of 13 March 2018

Sandra Lynn (née Adolfsson; born 13 June 1987) is a Swedish footballer who plays for Vittsjö GIK in the Damallsvenskan.

== Honours ==
Sweden

- Algarve Cup: 2018
