= Jenny Hallstenson =

Swedish footballer

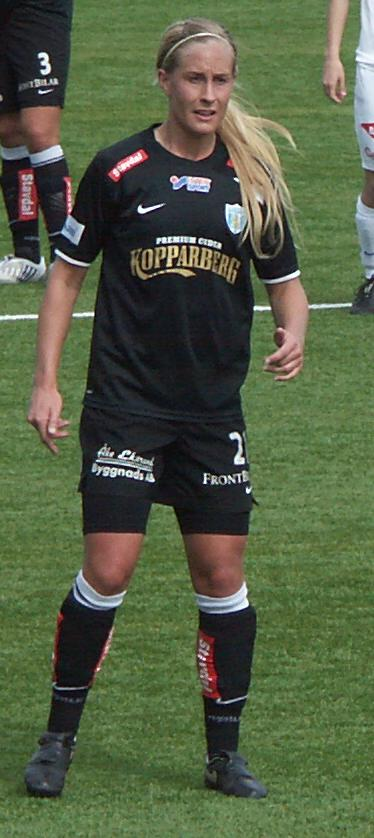

Personal information
- Full name: Jennifer Hallstenson
- Date of birth: 29 October 1980 (age 46)
- Place of birth: Sweden
- Height: 1.71 m (5 ft 7 in)
- Position: Midfielder

Youth career
- 1994–1997: QBIK

Senior career*
Years	Team	Apps	(Gls)
1998	IFK Skoghall		
1999–2007	QBIK		
2008–2011	Göteborg	79	(2)
2012	QBIK		
- * Club domestic league appearances and goals

Jenny Hallstenson (born 29 October 1980) is a Swedish football midfielder who most recently played in the Swedish 1st Division for QBIK. She previously played in the Damallsvenskan with QBIK and Göteborg FC, also playing the Champions League with the latter.

She announced her pregnancy during the 2012 season.
