= Choi Ye-seul (footballer, born 1998) =

South Korean footballer

Personal information
- Full name: Choi Ye-seul
- Date of birth: 24 December 1998 (age 27)
- Place of birth: South Korea
- Height: 1.60 m (5 ft 3 in)
- Position: Midfielder

Team information
- Current team: Changnyeong WFC
- Number: 25

Senior career*
Years	Team	Apps	(Gls)
2017–2018	INAC Kobe Leonessa	8	(0)
2019–2021	Hyundai Steel Red Angels		
2022	Changnyeong WFC		

International career^{‡}
2017	South Korea U20	3	(0)
2018	South Korea	1	(0)
- * Club domestic league appearances and goals ‡ National team caps and goals as of 05:47, 2 June 2026 (UTC)

Choi Ye-seul (Korean: 최예슬; born 24 December 1998) is a South Korean former footballer who played as a midfielder. She was a member of the South Korea women's national team squad at the 2018 AFC Women's Asian Cup.

== Club career ==
After a successful youth career playing for Pohang Girls' Electronic High School, Choi signed a contract with Japanese professional side INAC Kobe Leonessa, becoming the first Korean player to join the side directly from high school. She made her debut for INAC in March 2017. Choi returned to South Korea in 2018 and participated in the 2019 WK League new players' draft, where she was selected by Incheon Hyundai Steel Red Angels.

== International career ==
Choi made her full international debut for South Korea against Norway at the 2018 Algarve Cup, which remains her only appearance for the senior team. She was included in the squad for the 2018 AFC Women's Asian Cup in Jordan, but did not get any playing time at the tournament. Choi was selected to play at the 2018 Asian Games, but had to withdraw from the squad due to injury and was replaced by Lee Eun-mi.
