= Iceland women's national football team =

Women's national football team representing Iceland

Iceland
- Nickname: Stelpurnar okkar (Our Girls)
- Association: Football Association of Iceland (Knattspyrnusamband Íslands)
- Confederation: UEFA (Europe)
- Head coach: Þorsteinn Halldórsson
- Captain: Glódís Perla Viggósdóttir
- Most caps: Glódís Perla Viggósdóttir (148)
- Top scorer: Margrét Lára Viðarsdóttir (79)
- Home stadium: Laugardalsvöllur
- FIFA code: ISL
First colours	Second colours

FIFA ranking
- Current: 17 (16 June 2026)
- Highest: 13 (August 2024; March 2025)
- Lowest: 22 (September 2018 – March 2019)

First international
- Scotland 3–2 Iceland (Kilmarnock, Scotland; 20 September 1981)

Biggest win
- Iceland 12–0 Estonia (Reykjavík, Iceland; 17 September 2009)

Biggest defeat
- Germany 8–0 Iceland (Mannheim, Germany; 28 June 1996); United States 8–0 Iceland (Charlotte, United States; 5 April 2000)

European Championship
- Appearances: 5 (first in 2009)
- Best result: Quarter-finals (2013)

The Iceland women's national football team (Icelandic: Íslenska kvennalandsliðið í knattspyrnu) represents Iceland in international women's football. They are currently ranked as the 14th best women's national team in the world by FIFA as of June 2025.

== History ==
The Iceland women's national football team played its first game on 20 September 1981, facing Scotland. Bryndís Einarsdóttir scored Iceland's first ever goal in the 2–3 loss, with Ásta B. Gunnlaugsdóttir scoring the other.

In 1982, the team participated in the UEFA Women's European Championship. The team got placed in a qualifying group with Sweden, Finland, and Norway, recording two losses against Sweden (0–6) and Finland (0–2), and a 2–2 draw with Norway. Two years later, in 1984, Football Association of Iceland made the decision to withdraw the women's national team from international competition. The decision to remove the team from competition was met with disappointment from the players, but despite their efforts and objections the outcome stayed the same. In 1987, The Football Association of Iceland reached a further decision to formally disband the women's national team. The team remained inactive until between the years 1992 and 1993 when the team was reestablished.

On 30 October 2008, the national team qualified to the 2009 UEFA Women's Championship, the first major football tournament Iceland ever took part in, having previously competed in the 1995 UEFA Women's Championship which was a home and away knockout competition. At the 2013 UEFA Women's Championship, they took their first point in a major championship, following a draw against Norway in the opening game.

During qualifiers for Women's Euro 2009 Þóra Tómasdóttir and Hrafnhildur Gunnarsdóttir followed the team and recorded the documentary Stelpurnar okkar (translated: Our Girls) which was premiered on 14 August 2009.

== Team image ==
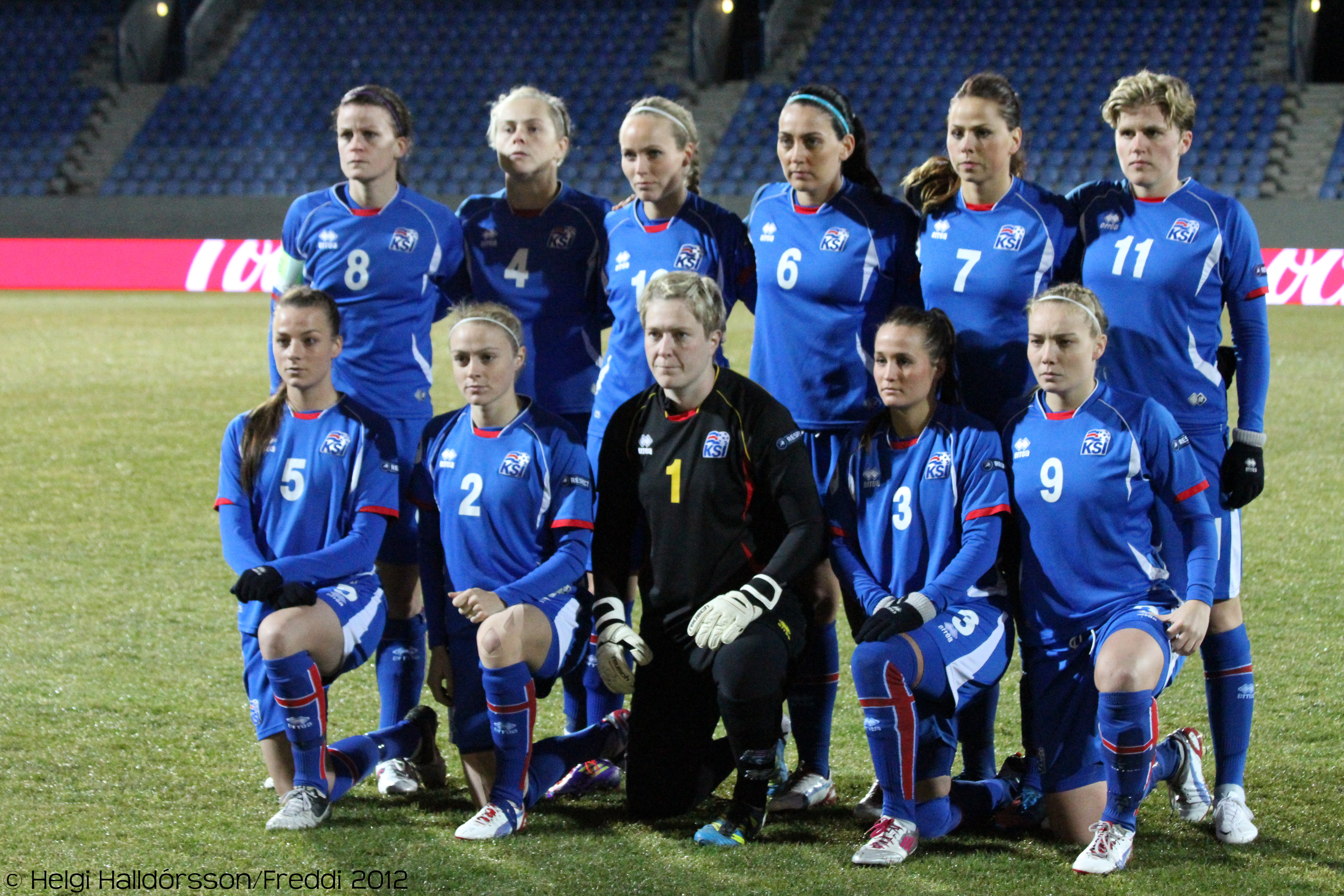
The women's national football team of Iceland

=== Nicknames ===
The Iceland women's national football team has been known or nicknamed as the "Stelpurnar okkar (Our Girls)".

=== Home stadium ===
Iceland plays their home matches on the Laugardalsvöllur.

== Results and fixtures ==
The following is a list of match results in the last 12 months, as well as any future matches that have been scheduled.

Legend

Win Draw Loss Fixture

=== 2026 ===
3 March 2027 FIFA Women's World Cup qualification	Spain	3–0	Iceland	Castelló de la Plana, Spain
19:00	Pina 39', 54'; Imade 76'	Report (FIFA); Report (UEFA)		Stadium: Estadio Municipal de Castalia; Attendance: 7,586; Referee: Emanuela Rusta (Albania)

7 March 2027 FIFA Women's World Cup qualification	England	2–0	Iceland	Nottingham, England
12:30 GMT	Bronze 22'; Stanway 78'	Report		Stadium: City Ground; Attendance: 27,474; Referee: Silvia Gasperotti (Italy)

14 April 2027 FIFA Women's World Cup qualification	Iceland	1–0	Ukraine	Reykjavík, Iceland
18:30 UTC+0	Jóhannsdóttir 47'	Report		Stadium: Laugardalsvöllur; Attendance: 1,453; Referee: Shona Shukrula (Netherlands)

18 April 2027 FIFA Women's World Cup qualification	Iceland	0–1	England	Reykjavík, Iceland
16:30 UTC+0		Report	Russo 21'	Stadium: Laugardalsvöllur; Attendance: 4,100; Referee: Michalina Diakow (Poland)

5 June 2027 FIFA Women's World Cup qualification	Ukraine	0–1	Iceland	Mielec, Poland (Note: Due to the Russian invasion of Ukraine, Ukraine are required to play their home matches at neutral venues until further notice.)
18:00 UTC+2		Report	Pálmadóttir 25'	Stadium: Stadion Stali Mielec; Referee: Hristiyana Guteva (Bulgaria)

9 June 2027 FIFA Women's World Cup qualification	Iceland	1–6	Spain	Reykjavík, Iceland
19:00 UTC+0	Boama 58'	Report	López 5', 50'; Imade 37'; Paralluelo 45'; Pina 68'; Bonmatí 84'	Stadium: Laugardalsvöllur; Referee: Miriama Bočková (Slovakia)

9 October 2027 FIFA Women's World Cup play-offs	Croatia	0–4	Iceland	Pula, Croatia
18:45 UTC+2		Report	A. Eiríksdóttir 14', 90+5'; Viggósdóttir 67' (pen.); H. Eiríksdóttir 75'	Stadium: Stadion Aldo Drosina; Attendance: 140; Referee: Frida Klarlund (Denmark)

13 October 2027 FIFA Women's World Cup play-offs	Iceland	5–0 (9–0 agg.)	Croatia	Reykjavík, Iceland
15:30 UTC+0	H. Eiríksdóttir 35'; Hermannsdóttir 40'; Tryggvadóttir 57'; Zomers 87', 90+3'	Report		Stadium: Laugardalsvöllur; Attendance: 2,023; Referee: Olatz Rivera Olmedo (Spain)
Note: Iceland won 9–0 on aggregate and advanced to the second round

1 December 2027 FIFA Women's World Cup play-offs	Portugal	v	Iceland	Guimarães, Portugal
17:00 UTC+0		Report		Stadium: Estádio D. Afonso Henriques

5 December 2027 FIFA Women's World Cup play-offs	Iceland	v	Portugal	Reykjavik, Iceland
--:-- UTC+0		Report		Stadium: Laugardalsvöllur

== Coaching staff ==
=== Current coaching staff ===
As of 10 July 2021

Position	Name	Ref.
Head coach	Þorsteinn Halldórsson	
Assistant coach	Ásmundur Haraldsson	

=== Manager history ===
Name	Years	Matches	Won	Tied	Lost
(Iceland) Sigurður Hannesson	1981–1984	7	0	1	6
(Iceland) Sigurbergur Sigsteinsson	1985–1986	8	4	1	3
(Iceland) Aðalsteinn Örnólfsson	1987	2	0	0	2
(Iceland) Steinn Mar Helgason	1992	4	1	1	2
(Iceland) Logi Ólafsson	1993–1994	8	6	0	2
(Iceland) Kristinn Björnsson	1995–1996	16	3	2	11
(Iceland) Vanda Sigurgeirsdóttir	1997–1998	12	1	3	8
(Iceland) Þórður Lárusson	1999	3	0	2	1
(Iceland) Logi Ólafsson	2000	7	1	2	4
(Iceland) Jörundur Áki Sveinsson	2001–2003	10	1	4	5
(Iceland) Helena Ólafsdóttir	2003–2004	14	5	1	8
(Iceland) Jörundur Áki Sveinsson	2005–2006	12	4	1	7
(Iceland) Sigurður Ragnar Eyjólfsson	2007–2013	77	39	8	30
(Iceland) Freyr Alexandersson	2013–2018	59	27	13	19
(Iceland) Jón Þór Hauksson	2018–2020	20	12	4	4
(Iceland) Þorsteinn Halldórsson	2021–	72	36	13	23

As of 11 October 2026 after the match against Croatia.

== Players ==
=== Current squad ===
The following players were called up for the 2027 FIFA Women's World Cup qualification matches against Ukraine and Spain on 5 and 9 June 2026, respectively.

Caps and goals correct as of 9 June 2026, after the match against Spain.

No.	Pos.	Player	Date of birth (age)	Caps	Goals	Club
1	GK	Cecilía Rán Rúnarsdóttir	26 July 2003 (age 23)	31	0	(Italian Football Federation) Inter Milan
12	GK	Telma Ívarsdóttir	30 March 1999 (age 27)	12	0	(Italian Football Federation) Inter Milan
13	GK	Fanney Inga Birkisdóttir	17 March 2005 (age 21)	8	0	(Swedish Football Association) BK Häcken
2	DF	Arna Eiríksdóttir	14 September 2002 (age 24)	4	0	(Norwegian Football Federation) Vålerenga
4	DF	Glódís Perla Viggósdóttir (captain)	27 June 1995 (age 31)	148	13	(German Football Association) Bayern Munich
6	DF	Ingibjörg Sigurðardóttir	7 October 1997 (age 29)	86	3	(German Football Association) SC Freiburg
18	DF	Guðrún Arnardóttir	29 July 1995 (age 31)	63	1	(Swedish Football Association) Hammarby
19	DF	Sædís Rún Heiðarsdóttir	16 September 2004 (age 22)	29	0	(German Football Association) 1. FC Köln
23	DF	Hafrún Rakel Halldórsdóttir	1 October 2002 (age 24)	18	1	(Danish Football Association) Brøndby
7	MF	Katla Tryggvadóttir	5 May 2005 (age 21)	13	0	(Italian Football Federation) Fiorentina
8	MF	Alexandra Jóhannsdóttir	19 March 2000 (age 26)	65	7	(Swedish Football Association) Kristianstads
10	MF	Karólína Lea Vilhjálmsdóttir	8 August 2001 (age 25)	64	15	(Italian Football Federation) Inter Milan
15	MF	María Ólafsdóttir Grós	5 February 2003 (age 23)	2	0	(Swedish Football Association) Djurgården
16	MF	Hildur Antonsdóttir	18 September 1995 (age 31)	37	2	(Royal Spanish Football Federation) Madrid CFF
17	MF	Ida Marín Hermannsdóttir	13 July 2002 (age 24)	9	0	(Football Association of Iceland) FH
3	FW	Sandra María Jessen	18 January 1995 (age 31)	65	7	(German Football Association) 1. FC Köln
5	FW	Emilía Kiær Ásgeirsdóttir	31 January 2005 (age 21)	15	1	(Italian Football Federation) Fiorentina
9	FW	Diljá Ýr Zomers	11 November 2001 (age 25)	27	2	(Norwegian Football Federation) SK Brann
11	FW	Birta Georgsdóttir	23 August 2002 (age 24)	2	0	(Italian Football Federation) Genoa
14	FW	Hlín Eiríksdóttir	12 June 2000 (age 26)	60	8	(Swedish Football Association) Malmö FF
20	FW	Thelma Karen Pálmadóttir	18 April 2008 (age 18)	5	1	(Swedish Football Association) BK Häcken
21	FW	Jelena Tinna Kujundzić	10 January 2003 (age 23)	0	0	(Football Association of Iceland) Þróttur Reykjavík
22	FW	Linda Líf Boama	15 August 2001 (age 25)	4	1	(Swedish Football Association) Kristianstads

=== Recent call-ups ===
The following players have also been called up to the squad within the past 12 months.

Pos.	Player	Date of birth (age)	Caps	Goals	Club	Latest call-up
MF	Amanda Andradóttir	18 December 2003 (age 22)	26	2	(Netherlands) Twente	v. Northern Ireland, 29 October 2025
FW	Agla María Albertsdóttir	5 August 1999 (age 27)	65	4	(Iceland) Breiðablik	v. Northern Ireland, 29 October 2025
FW	Vigdís Lilja Kristjánsdóttir	23 April 2005 (age 21)	0	0	(Belgium) Anderlecht	v. Northern Ireland, 29 October 2025
Notes: ^{INJ} = Withdrew due to injury; ^{PRE} = Preliminary squad / standby; ^{RET} = Retired from the national team

=== Previous squads ===
UEFA Women's Championship

- 2009 UEFA Women's Championship
- 2013 UEFA Women's Championship
- 2017 UEFA Women's Championship

=== Captains ===
- Katrín Jónsdóttir (2007–2013)
- Margrét Lára Viðarsdóttir (2015–2017)
- Sara Björk Gunnarsdóttir (2014, 2017–2022)
- Glódís Perla Viggósdóttir (2023–)

== Records ==
As of 9 June 2026

Players in bold are still active with the national team.

=== Most appearances ===
#	Player	Career	Caps	Goals
1	**Glódís Perla Viggósdóttir**	2012–present	148	13
2	Sara Björk Gunnarsdóttir	2007–2022	145	24
3	Katrín Jónsdóttir	1994–2013	133	21
4	Hallbera Gísladóttir	2008–2022	131	2
5	Margrét Lára Viðarsdóttir	2003–2019	124	79
6	**Dagný Brynjarsdóttir**	2010–present	122	38
7	Dóra María Lárusdóttir	2003–2017	114	18
8	Hólmfríður Magnúsdóttir	2003–2020	113	37
9	**Fanndís Friðriksdóttir**	2009–present	110	17
10	Þóra Björg Helgadóttir	1998–2014	108	1

=== Top goalscorers ===
#	Player	Career	Goals	Caps	Avg.
1	Margrét Lára Viðarsdóttir	2003–2019	79	124	0.64
2	**Dagný Brynjarsdóttir**	2010–present	38	122	0.31
3	Hólmfríður Magnúsdóttir	2003–2020	37	113	0.33
4	Sara Björk Gunnarsdóttir	2007–2022	24	145	0.17
5	Ásthildur Helgadóttir	1993–2007	23	69	0.33
6	Katrín Jónsdóttir	1994–2013	21	133	0.16
7	Harpa Þorsteinsdóttir	2006–2018	19	67	0.28
8	Dóra María Lárusdóttir	2003–2017	18	114	0.16
9	**Fanndís Friðriksdóttir**	2009–present	17	110	0.15
10	**Sveindís Jane Jónsdóttir**	2020–present	16	60	0.27
10	Elín Metta Jensen	2012–2022	16	62	0.26

== Honours ==
=== Friendly ===
- Algarve Cup
  - Runners-up: 2011
  - Third place: 2014, 2016
- SheBelieves Cup
  - Runners-up: 2022
- Pinatar Cup
  - Champions: 2023

== Competitive record ==
=== FIFA Women's World Cup ===
FIFA Women's World Cup record									Qualification record						
Year	Result	GP	W	D*	L	GF	GA	GD	GP	W	D*	L	GF	GA	GD
(China) 1991	Did not enter								UEFA Women's Euro 1991						
(Sweden) 1995	Did not qualify								UEFA Women's Euro 1995						
(United States) 1999	Did not qualify								6	1	2	3	5	9	−4
(United States) 2003	Did not qualify								8	2	4	2	10	12	−2
(China) 2007	Did not qualify								10	4	2	4	20	15	+5
(Germany) 2011	Did not qualify								10	8	0	2	33	3	+30
(Canada) 2015	Did not qualify								10	6	1	3	29	9	+20
(France) 2019	Did not qualify								8	5	2	1	22	6	+16
(Australia) (New Zealand) 2023	Did not qualify								9	6	0	3	25	3	+22
(Brazil) 2027	To be determined								2	0	0	2	0	5	-5
(Costa Rica) (Jamaica) (Mexico) (United States) 2031	To be determined								To be determined						
(United Kingdom) 2035	To be determined								To be determined						
Total	—	–	–	–	–	–	–	–	63	31	11	20	144	62	+82

*Draws include knockout matches decided on penalty kicks.

=== UEFA Women's Championship ===
UEFA Women's Championship record									Qualifying record								
Year	Result	P	W	D*	L	GF	GA	GD	P	W	D*	L	GF	GA	GD	P/R	Rnk
1984	Did not qualify								6	0	1	5	2	19	−17	–	
(Norway) 1987	Did not enter								Did not enter								
(West Germany) 1989	Did not enter								Did not enter								
(Denmark) 1991	Did not enter								Did not enter								
(Italy) 1993	Did not qualify								4	1	1	2	3	7	−4	–	
(Germany) 1995	Did not qualify								6	4	0	2	14	6	+8	–	
(Norway) (Sweden) 1997	Did not qualify								8	2	1	5	8	21	−13	–	
(Germany) 2001	Did not qualify								8	1	3	4	14	19	−5	–	
(England) 2005	Did not qualify								10	4	1	5	26	20	+6	–	
(Finland) 2009	Group stage	3	0	0	3	1	5	−4	10	7	1	2	31	5	+26	–	
(Sweden) 2013	Quarter-finals	4	1	1	2	2	8	−6	12	9	1	2	34	8	+26	–	
(Netherlands) 2017	Group stage	3	0	0	3	1	6	−5	8	7	0	1	34	2	+32	–	
(England) 2022	Group stage	3	0	3	0	3	3	0	8	6	1	1	25	5	+20	–	
(Switzerland) 2025	Group stage	3	0	0	3	3	7	−4	6	4	1	1	11	5	+6	(Note: From Euro 2025 onwards a new qualifying format was introduced, linked to the Women's Nations League where teams are divided into leagues with promotion/relegation between the leagues at the end of each cycle.)	5th
(Germany) 2029																	
Total	5/14	16	1	4	11	10	29	–19	86	45	11	30	202	117	+85	5th	

*Draws include knockout matches decided on penalty kicks.

=== UEFA Women's Nations League ===
UEFA Women's Nations League record
League phase												Finals							
Season	LG	Grp	Pos	Pld	W	D	L	GF	GA	P/R	RK	Year	Pos	Pld	W	D	L	GF	GA
2023–24	A	3	3rd	8	4	1	3	7	10	*	9th	(Europe) 2024	Did not qualify						
2025	A	2	3rd	8	2	4	2	11	9	*	12th	(N/A) 2025	Did not qualify						
Total				16	6	5	5	18	19	9th and 12th		Total	–	–	–	–	–	–	–

▲	Promoted at end of season
Same position	No movement at end of season
▼	Relegated at end of season
*	Participated in promotion/relegation play-offs

=== Algarve Cup ===
The Algarve Cup is an invitational tournament for national teams in women's association football hosted by the Portuguese Football Federation (FPF). Held annually in the Algarve region of Portugal since 1994, it is one of the most prestigious and longest-running women's international football events and has been nicknamed the "Mini FIFA Women's World Cup".

(Portugal) Algarve Cup record
Year	Result	Matches	Wins	Draws	Losses	GF	GA
1994	Did not enter						
1995	Did not enter						
1996	6th place	4	1	1	2	4	6
1997	7th place	4	0	1	3	1	12
1998 - 2006	Did not enter						
2007	9th place	4	2	1	1	11	5
2008	7th place	4	4	0	0	12	1
2009	6th place	4	1	0	3	3	5
2010	9th place	4	1	0	3	6	10
2011	Runners-up	4	3	0	1	7	6
2012	6th place	4	1	0	3	3	8
2013	9th place	4	1	0	3	5	11
2014	Third place	4	3	0	1	5	7
2015	10th place	4	0	1	3	0	5
2016	Third place	4	2	1	1	7	4
2017	9th place	4	1	2	1	3	4
2018	9th place	4	0	3	1	2	3
2019	9th place	3	1	1	1	5	5
Total	15/26	59	21	11	27	74	92

=== Other tournaments ===
Year	Result	Matches	Wins	Draws	Losses	GF	GA
2022 SheBelieves Cup	Runners-up	3	2	0	1	3	6
2023 Pinatar Cup	Champions	3	2	1	0	7	0

== See also ==
- Sport in Iceland
  - Football in Iceland
    - Women's football in Iceland
- Iceland men's national football team
