= Cheyenne van den Goorbergh =

Dutch footballer (born 1997)

Personal information
- Full name: Cheyenne van den Goorbergh
- Date of birth: 6 September 1997 (age 29)
- Place of birth: Voorburg, Netherlands
- Position: Midfielder

Youth career
- 2009–2014: Twente

Senior career*
Years	Team	Apps	(Gls)
2014–2020	Twente	79	(4)
2020–2021	PEC Zwolle	20	(0)
2021–2024	Feyenoord	57	(4)
2024–2025	ADO Den Haag	20	(2)
Total		176	(10)

International career
2012	Netherlands U15	5	(0)
2013	Netherlands U16	7	(1)
2013–2014	Netherlands U17	9	(0)
2014–2016	Netherlands U19	14	(2)
2019–2020	Netherlands U23	6	(0)
2018	Netherlands	1	(1)
- * Club domestic league appearances and goals

Cheyenne van den Goorbergh (born 6 September 1997) is a Dutch former professional footballer who played as a midfielder.

== Club career ==
=== Twente ===
Van den Goorbergh made her league debut for Twente on 2 May 2014 in a 7–0 win against Antwerp. She scored her first league goal against Excelsior on 15 December 2017, scoring in the 26th minute.

=== PEC Zwolle ===
On 15 June 2020, van den Goorbergh, along with Maxime Bennink, was announced at PEC Zwolle. She made her league debut against ADO Den Haag on 6 September 2020.

=== Feyenoord ===
In summer 2021, van den Goorbergh signed for Feyenoord, the club she supported. She made her league debut against ADO Den Haag on 29 August 2021. Van den Goorbergh scored her first league goal against Ajax on 3 October 2021, scoring in the 75th minute. On 13 June 2022, it was announced that van den Goorbergh had signed a new one-year deal. On 23 April 2024, it was announced that van den Goorbergh's contract would not be renewed.

=== ADO Den Haag ===
On 8 July 2024, van den Goorbergh joined ADO Den Haag on a one-year contract. She retired from professional football in May 2025.

== International career ==
On 2 March 2018, van den Goorbergh made her senior team debut for Netherlands by scoring a goal in a 3–2 win against Denmark.

== Career statistics ==
=== International ===
Appearances and goals by national team and year
National team	Year	Apps	Goals
Netherlands	2018	1	1
Total		1	1

Scores and results list Netherlands' goal tally first, score column indicates score after each van den Goorbergh goal.

List of international goals scored by Cheyenne van den Goorbergh
No.	Date	Venue	Opponent	Score	Result	Competition
1	2 March 2018	VRS António Sports Complex, Vila Real de Santo António, Portugal	Denmark	1–1	3–2	2018 Algarve Cup

== Honours ==
Twente

- BeNe League: 2013–14
- Eredivisie : 2015–16, 2018–19
- KNVB Women's Cup: 2014–15

Netherlands

- Algarve Cup: 2018
