= Sofiya Shishkina =

Russian footballer (born 1998)

Personal information
- Full name: Sofiya Dmitrievna Shishkina
- Date of birth: 30 September 1998 (age 28)
- Place of birth: Russia,
- Height: 1.67 m (5 ft 6 in)
- Position: Forward

Team information
- Current team: Zvezda Perm

Senior career*
Years	Team	Apps	(Gls)
2017-	Zvezda Perm	60	(4)

International career^{‡}
2017	Russia U19	3	(0)
2018-	Russia	5	(0)
- * Club domestic league appearances and goals as of 21:55, 31 October 2019 (UTC) ‡ National team caps and goals as of 19:21, 30 August 2019 (UTC)

Sofiya Dmitrievna Shishkina (Russian: София Дмитриевна Шишкина; born 30 September 1998) is a Russian footballer who plays for Zvezda-2005 Perm as a forward and has appeared for the Russia women's national team.

== Career ==
Shishkina has been capped for the Russia national team, appearing for the team during the 2019 FIFA Women's World Cup qualifying cycle.
