= 2018 Algarve Cup =

International women's football tournament

Tournament details
- Host country: Portugal
- Dates: 28 February – 7 March
- Teams: 12 (from 3 confederations)
- Venues: 5 (in 5 host cities)

Final positions
- Champions: Netherlands; Sweden (Final cancelled)
- Third place: Portugal
- Fourth place: Australia

Tournament statistics
- Matches played: 22
- Goals scored: 61 (2.77 per match)
- Top scorer(s): (Canada) Christine Sinclair (Netherlands) Lieke Martens (Sweden) Fridolina Rolfö (3 goals each)
- Best player: (Portugal) Cláudia Neto
- Fair play award: Japan

The 2018 Algarve Cup was the 25th edition of the Algarve Cup, an invitational women's football tournament held annually in Portugal. It took place from 28 February to 7 March 2018.

The final was cancelled after torrential rain flooded the pitch: the Netherlands and Sweden were declared joint winners of the Algarve Cup.

== Format ==
The twelve invited teams were split into three groups to play a round-robin tournament.

Points awarded in the group stage followed the standard formula of three points for a win, one point for a draw and zero points for a loss. In the case of two teams being tied on the same number of points in a group, their head-to-head result determine the higher place.

== Teams ==
Team	FIFA Rankings (December 2017)
Australia	4
Canada	5
Netherlands	7
Japan	9
Sweden	10
Denmark	12
Norway	14
South Korea	14
China	16
Iceland	20
Russia	25
Portugal	38

== Venues ==
- Albufeira Municipal Stadium, Albufeira
- Bela Vista Municipal Stadium, Parchal
- Estádio Algarve
- Lagos Municipal Stadium, Lagos
- VRS António Sports Complex, Vila Real de Santo António

== Group stage ==
The groups were announced on 6 December 2017, and re-organised on 18 December, due to South Korea being drawn against Australia in the Asian Cup finals the following month.

All times are local (UTC±0).

=== Tie-breaking criteria ===
For the group stage of this tournament, where two or more teams in a group tied on an equal number of points, the finishing positions were determined by the following tie-breaking criteria in the following order:

1. number of points obtained in the matches among the teams in question
2. goal difference in all the group matches
3. number of goals scored in all the group matches
4. fair-play ranking in all the group matches
5. FIFA ranking

=== Group A ===
Pos	Team	Pld	W	D	L	GF	GA	GD	Pts
1	Australia	3	2	1	0	6	3	+3	7
2	Portugal (H)	3	2	1	0	4	1	+3	7
3	Norway	3	1	0	2	5	6	−1	3
4	China	3	0	0	3	1	6	−5	0

Source: FPF
Rules for classification: Tiebreakers
(H) Hosts
28 February 2018
15:00

Portugal	2–1	China
C. Mendes 60'; C. Costa 85'	Report	Xu Yanlu 57'

Lagos Municipal Stadium, Lagos
Referee: Marianela Araya (Costa Rica)
28 February 2018
18:30

Australia	4–3	Norway
Polkinghorne 13'; Logarzo 24'; Kerr 31'; Crummer 90+5'	Report	Thorsnes 11', 61' (pen.); Ultand 52'

Albufeira Municipal Stadium, Albufeira
Referee: Monika Mularczyk (Poland)

2 March 2018
15:00

Portugal	0–0	Australia
	Report

Estádio Algarve
Referee: Jonesia Kabakama (Tanzania)
2 March 2018
15:00

China	0–2	Norway
	Report	Engen 25'; Mjelde 88'

VRS António Sports Complex, Vila Real de Santo António
Referee: Katja Koroleva (United States)

5 March 2018
19:00

Portugal	2–0	Norway
Neto 36'; Di. Silva 49'	Report

Estádio Algarve
Referee: Monika Mularczyk (Poland)
5 March 2018
19:00

Australia	2–0	China
Logarzo 51'; Kerr 90+1'	Report

Albufeira Municipal Stadium, Albufeira
Referee: Laura Fortunato (Argentina)

=== Group B ===
Pos	Team	Pld	W	D	L	GF	GA	GD	Pts
1	Sweden	3	2	1	0	7	2	+5	7
2	Canada	3	2	0	1	5	3	+2	6
3	South Korea	3	1	1	1	4	5	−1	4
4	Russia	3	0	0	3	1	7	−6	0

Source: FPF
Rules for classification: Tiebreakers
28 February 2018
15:00

South Korea	3–1	Russia
Lee Min-a 45'; Han Chae-rin 52'; Jung Seol-bin 77'	Report	Belomyttseva 17'

Albufeira Municipal Stadium, Albufeira
Referee: Laura Fortunato (Argentina)
28 February 2018
19:00

Canada	1–3	Sweden
Beckie 46'	Report	Larsson 43'; Rolfö 51'; Blackstenius 87'

Bela Vista Municipal Stadium, Parchal
Referee: Ledya Tafesse (Ethiopia)

2 March 2018
19:00

Russia	0–1	Canada
	Report	Sinclair 25' (pen.)

Estádio Algarve
Referee: Sandra Braz Bastos (Portugal)
2 March 2018
19:00

Sweden	1–1	South Korea
Blackstenius 20'	Report	Lee Min-a 33'

Bela Vista Municipal Stadium, Parchal
Referee: Salima Mukansanga (Rwanda)

5 March 2018
15:00

Sweden	3–0	Russia
Angeldal 31'; Rolfö 50', 61'	Report

Bela Vista Municipal Stadium, Parchal
Referee: Marianela Araya (Costa Rica)
5 March 2018
15:00

South Korea	0–3	Canada
	Report	Sinclair 24', 79'; Fleming 73'

Lagos Municipal Stadium, Lagos
Referee: María Carvajal (Chile)

=== Group C ===
Pos	Team	Pld	W	D	L	GF	GA	GD	Pts
1	Netherlands	3	2	1	0	9	4	+5	7
2	Japan	3	2	0	1	6	7	−1	6
3	Iceland	3	0	2	1	1	2	−1	2
4	Denmark	3	0	1	2	2	5	−3	1

Source: FPF
Rules for classification: Tiebreakers
28 February 2018
15:40

Japan	2–6	Netherlands
Nakajima 38'; Iwabuchi 82'	Report	Martens 4', 52'; Beerensteyn 8'; Worm 31'; Van de Sanden 35'; Van der Gragt 44'

Bela Vista Municipal Stadium, Parchal
Referee: Anastasia Pustovoitova (Russia)
28 February 2018
18:30

Denmark	0–0	Iceland
	Report

Lagos Municipal Stadium, Lagos
Referee: Jeong Oh-hyeon (South Korea)

2 March 2018
15:25

Japan	2–1	Iceland
Sugasawa 15'; Utsugi 85'	Report	Eiríksdóttir 74'

Bela Vista Municipal Stadium, Parchal
Referee: María Carvajal (Chile)
2 March 2018
18:30

Denmark	2–3	Netherlands
Harder 19'; Thøgersen 34'	Report	Van den Goorbergh 31'; Martens 78'; Boye Sørensen 90+4' (o.g.)

VRS António Sports Complex, Vila Real de Santo António
Referee: Casey Reibelt (Australia)

5 March 2018
15:40

Japan	2–0	Denmark
Hasegawa 82'; Iwabuchi 90+3' (pen.)	Report

Estádio Algarve
Referee: Ledya Tafesse (Ethiopia)
5 March 2018
15:40

Iceland	0–0	Netherlands
	Report

Albufeira Municipal Stadium, Albufeira
Referee: Jeong Oh-hyeon (South Korea)

=== Ranking of teams for placement matches ===
The ranking of the 1st, 2nd, 3rd, and 4th placed teams in each group to determine the placement matches:

- 1st placed teams

Pos	Grp	Team	Pld	W	D	L	GF	GA	GD	Pts	Qualification
1	C	Netherlands	3	2	1	0	9	4	+5	7	Final
2	B	Sweden	3	2	1	0	7	2	+5	7	Final
3	A	Australia	3	2	1	0	6	3	+3	7	Third-place match

Source: FPF
- 2nd placed teams

Pos	Grp	Team	Pld	W	D	L	GF	GA	GD	Pts	Qualification
1	A	Portugal	3	2	1	0	4	1	+3	7	Third-place match
2	B	Canada	3	2	0	1	5	3	+2	6	Fifth-place match
3	C	Japan	3	2	0	1	6	7	−1	6	Fifth-place match

Source: FPF
- 3rd placed teams

Pos	Grp	Team	Pld	W	D	L	GF	GA	GD	Pts	Qualification
1	B	South Korea	3	1	1	1	4	5	−1	4	Seventh-place match
2	A	Norway	3	1	0	2	5	6	−1	3	Seventh-place match
3	C	Iceland	3	0	2	1	1	2	−1	2	Ninth-place match

Source: FPF
- 4th placed teams

Pos	Grp	Team	Pld	W	D	L	GF	GA	GD	Pts	Qualification
1	C	Denmark	3	0	1	2	2	5	−3	1	Ninth-place match
2	A	China	3	0	0	3	1	6	−5	0	Eleventh-place match
3	B	Russia	3	0	0	3	1	7	−6	0	Eleventh-place match

Source: FPF

== Placement matches ==
=== Eleventh place game ===
7 March 2018
14:00

China	2–1	Russia
Liu Shanshan 53'; Song Duan 78'	Report	Shishkina 40'

VRS António Sports Complex, Vila Real de Santo António
Referee: Jonesia Kabakama (Tanzania)

=== Ninth place game ===
7 March 2018
18:30

Iceland	1–1	Denmark
Eiríksdóttir 70'	Report	Troelsgaard Nielsen 62'
Penalties
Sigurðardóttir (penalty scored); Hönnudóttir (penalty scored); Kristjánsdóttir (penalty scored); Albertsdóttir (penalty scored); Hauksdóttir (penalty scored)	5–4	(penalty scored) Christiansen; (penalty scored) Troelsgaard Nielsen; (penalty missed) Holmgaard; (penalty scored) Sørensen; (penalty scored) Arnth

VRS António Sports Complex, Vila Real de Santo António
Referee: Salima Mukansanga (Rwanda)

=== Seventh place game ===
7 March 2018
18:30

South Korea	0–0	Norway
	Report

Albufeira Municipal Stadium, Albufeira
Referee: Sandra Braz Bastos (Portugal)
- The match was abandoned at half-time with the score 0–0 due to torrential rain that flooded the pitch: both teams were awarded joint seventh place.

=== Fifth place game ===
7 March 2018
14:55

Canada	2–0	Japan
Beckie 20'; Lawrence 50'	Report

Bela Vista Municipal Stadium, Parchal
Referee: Casey Reibelt (Australia)

=== Third place game ===
7 March 2018
15:00

Australia	1–2	Portugal
Cooper 45+3'	Report	Gomes 38'; Malho 56'

Albufeira Municipal Stadium, Albufeira
Referee: Katja Koroleva (United States)

=== Final ===
7 March 2018
18:30

Netherlands	Cancelled	Sweden
	Report

Bela Vista Municipal Stadium, Parchal

The final was cancelled after torrential rain flooded the pitch: the Netherlands and Sweden were declared joint winners of the Algarve Cup.

== Final standings ==
Rank	Team
1st place, gold medalist(s)	Netherlands
1st place, gold medalist(s)	Sweden
3rd place, bronze medalist(s)	Portugal
4	Australia
5	Canada
6	Japan
7	South Korea
7	Norway
9	Iceland
10	Denmark
11	China
12	Russia

=== Awards ===
Top Goalscorer	Player of the Tournament	Fair play award
(Canada) Christine Sinclair (Netherlands) Lieke Martens (Sweden) Fridolina Rolfö	(Portugal) Cláudia Neto	Japan

== Goalscorers ==
3 goals

- (Canada) Christine Sinclair
- (Netherlands) Lieke Martens
- (Sweden) Fridolina Rolfö

2 goals

- (Australia) Chloe Logarzo
- (Australia) Sam Kerr
- (Canada) Janine Beckie
- (Iceland) Hlín Eiríksdóttir
- (Japan) Mana Iwabuchi
- (Norway) Elise Thorsnes
- (South Korea) Lee Min-a
- (Sweden) Stina Blackstenius

1 goal

- (Australia) Caitlin Cooper
- (Australia) Larissa Crummer
- (Australia) Clare Polkinghorne
- (Canada) Ashley Lawrence
- (Canada) Jessie Fleming
- (China) Liu Shanshan
- (China) Song Duan
- (China) Xu Yanlu
- (Denmark) Pernille Harder
- (Denmark) Frederikke Thøgersen
- (Denmark) Sanne Troelsgaard Nielsen
- (Japan) Yui Hasegawa
- (Japan) Emi Nakajima
- (Japan) Yuika Sugasawa
- (Japan) Rumi Utsugi
- (Netherlands) Lineth Beerensteyn
- (Netherlands) Shanice van de Sanden
- (Netherlands) Cheyenne van den Goorbergh
- (Netherlands) Stefanie van der Gragt
- (Netherlands) Siri Worm
- (Norway) Ingrid Engen
- (Norway) Maren Mjelde
- (Norway) Lisa-Marie Utland
- (Portugal) Carole Costa
- (Portugal) Nádia Gomes
- (Portugal) Vanessa Malho
- (Portugal) Carolina Mendes
- (Portugal) Cláudia Neto
- (Portugal) Diana Silva
- (Russia) Anna Belomyttseva
- (Russia) Sofia Shishkina
- (South Korea) Han Chae-rin
- (South Korea) Jung Seol-bin
- (Sweden) Filippa Angeldal
- (Sweden) Mimmi Larsson

Own goal

- (Denmark) Simone Boye Sørensen (playing against the Netherlands)
