= 2025 Besta deild karla =

Besta deild karla
- Season: 2025
- Dates: 5 April – 26 October 2025
- Champions: Víkingur Reykjavík (8th title)
- Relegated: Vestri; Afturelding
- Champions League: Víkingur Reykjavík
- Europa League: Vestri
- Conference League: Stjarnan; Valur
- Matches: 162
- Goals: 538 (3.32 per match)
- Top goalscorer: Patrick Pedersen (18 goals)
- Biggest home win: KR 5–0 ÍA (27 April 2025); Valur 6–1 ÍA (10 May 2025); Valur 6–1 KR (23 June 2025); FH 5–0 KA (13 July 2025)
- Biggest away win: KR 0–7 Víkingur (14 September 2025)
- Highest scoring: Breiðablik 4–5 FH (17 August 2025)
- Longest winning run: 6 matches Víkingur
- Longest unbeaten run: 9 matches Víkingur
- Longest winless run: 11 matches Afturelding
- Longest losing run: 4 matches Vestri
- Highest attendance: 3107; KR 1–1 Breiðablik (26 July 2025)
- Lowest attendance: 200; Vestri 1–0 FH (13 April 2025)
- Total attendance: 137,909
- Average attendance: 851

The 2025 Besta deild karla was the 114th season of top-flight Icelandic Football. It was the fourth season following the league's rebrand as Besta deild karla.

== Teams ==
The league consisted of twelve teams: the top ten teams from the previous season, and two teams promoted from the 1. deild karla. Breiðablik entered the season as defending champions after winning their seventh title during the previous season.

The promoted teams were the 2024 1. deild karla champions ÍBV (promoted after a single-season absence), and play-off winners Afturelding (promoted to the top division for the first time in their history). They replaced the 2024 Besta deild karla bottom two teams, HK and Fylkir.

=== Changes from the previous season ===
Promoted to the Besta deild

- ÍBV
- Afturelding

Relegated to the 1. deild

- HK
- Fylkir

=== Personnel and kits ===
| Team | Manager | Captain | Kit manufacturer | Shirt sponsor (chest) |
|---|---|---|---|---|
| Afturelding | (Iceland) Magnús Már Einarsson | (Iceland) Aron Elí Sævarsson | (Germany) Jako | Kaleo |
| Breiðablik | (Iceland) Ólafur Ingi Skúlason | (Iceland) Höskuldur Gunnlaugsson | (United States) Nike | Vörður |
| FH | (Iceland) Heimir Guðjónsson | (Iceland) Björn Daníel Sverrisson | (United States) Nike | Auður |
| Fram | (Iceland) Rúnar Kristinsson | (Denmark) Kennie Chopart | (Italy) Erreà | Michelsen 1909 |
| ÍA | (Iceland) Lárus Orri Sigurðsson | (Iceland) Rúnar Már Sigurjónsson | (Germany) Puma | Norðurál |
| ÍBV | (Iceland) Þorlákur Már Árnason | (Iceland) Alex Freyr Hilmarsson | (United States) Nike | N1 |
| KA | (Iceland) Hallgrímur Jónasson | (Iceland) Ívar Örn Árnason | (Italy) Macron | N1 |
| KR | (Iceland) Óskar Hrafn Þorvaldsson | (Iceland) Aron Sigurðarson | (Italy) Macron | Alvotech |
| Stjarnan | (Iceland) Jökull I Elísabetarson | (Iceland) Guðmundur Kristjánsson | (Germany) Puma | TM |
| Valur | (Serbia) Srdjan Tufegdžić | (Iceland) Hólmar Örn Eyjólfsson | (Italy) Macron | Saltverk |
| Vestri | (Iceland) Jón Þór Hauksson | (Iceland) Elmar Atli Garðarsson | (Germany) Jako | Kerecis |
| Víkingur | (Iceland) Sölvi Geir Ottesen Jónsson | (Sweden) Oliver Ekroth | (Italy) Macron | Húsasmiðjan |

== Managerial changes ==
| Team | Outgoing manager | Manner of departure | Date of vacancy | Position in the table | Incoming manager | Date of appointment |
|---|---|---|---|---|---|---|
| ÍA | (Iceland) Jón Þór Hauksson | Sacked | 16 June 2025 | 12th | (Iceland) Lárus Orri Sigurðsson | 21 June 2025 |
| Vestri | (Iceland) Davíð Smári Lamude | Sacked | 29 September 2025 | 10th | (Iceland) Jón Þór Hauksson | 30 September 2025 |
| Breiðablik | (Iceland) Halldór Árnason | Sacked | 20 October 2025 | 4th | (Iceland) Ólafur Ingi Skúlason | 20 October 2025 |

== Stadia and locations ==
Locations of the 2025 Besta deild karla teams

| Team | Location | Stadium |
|---|---|---|
| Afturelding | Mosfellsbær | Malbikstöðin að Varmá |
| Breiðablik | Kópavogur | Kópavogsvöllur |
| FH | Hafnarfjörður | Kaplakriki |
| Fram | Reykjavík | Lambhagavöllur |
| ÍA | Akranes | ELKEM völlurinn |
| ÍBV | Vestmannaeyjar | Hásteinsvöllur |
| KA | Akureyri | Greifavöllurinn |
| KR | Reykjavík | Meistaravellir |
| Stjarnan | Garðabær | Samsung völlurinn |
| Valur | Reykjavík | N1 Völlurinn |
| Vestri | Ísafjörður | Kerecisvöllurinn |
| Víkingur Reykjavík | Reykjavík | Víkingsvöllur |

== Regular season ==
=== League table ===
| Pos | Team | Pld | W | D | L | GF | GA | GD | Pts | Qualification |
|---|---|---|---|---|---|---|---|---|---|---|
| 1 | Víkingur Reykjavík | 22 | 12 | 6 | 4 | 47 | 27 | +20 | 42 | Qualification for the Championship Round |
| 2 | Valur | 22 | 12 | 4 | 6 | 53 | 35 | +18 | 40 | Qualification for the Championship Round |
| 3 | Stjarnan | 22 | 12 | 4 | 6 | 43 | 35 | +8 | 40 | Qualification for the Championship Round |
| 4 | Breiðablik | 22 | 9 | 7 | 6 | 37 | 35 | +2 | 34 | Qualification for the Championship Round |
| 5 | FH | 22 | 8 | 6 | 8 | 41 | 35 | +6 | 30 | Qualification for the Championship Round |
| 6 | Fram | 22 | 8 | 5 | 9 | 32 | 31 | +1 | 29 | Qualification for the Championship Round |
| 7 | ÍBV | 22 | 8 | 5 | 9 | 24 | 28 | −4 | 29 | Qualification for the Relegation Round |
| 8 | KA | 22 | 8 | 5 | 9 | 29 | 39 | −10 | 29 | Qualification for the Relegation Round |
| 9 | Vestri | 22 | 8 | 3 | 11 | 23 | 28 | −5 | 27 | Qualification for the Relegation Round |
| 10 | KR | 22 | 6 | 6 | 10 | 42 | 51 | −9 | 24 | Qualification for the Relegation Round |
| 11 | ÍA | 22 | 7 | 1 | 14 | 26 | 43 | −17 | 22 | Qualification for the Relegation Round |
| 12 | Afturelding | 22 | 5 | 6 | 11 | 29 | 39 | −10 | 21 | Qualification for the Relegation Round |

Source: KSI (in Icelandic), Soccerway
Rules for classification: 1) Points; 2) Goal difference; 3) Goals scored; 4) Head-to-head points; 5) Head-to-head goal difference; 6) Head-to-head goals scored; 7) Head-to-head away goals scored; 8) Play-off (only for deciding champion); 9) Draw.

=== Results ===
Team played each other twice (once at home and once away) for a total of 22 games each.

| Home \ Away | AFT | BRE | FH | FRA | ÍA | ÍBV | KA | KR | STJ | VAL | VES | VÍK |
|---|---|---|---|---|---|---|---|---|---|---|---|---|
| Afturelding | — | 2–2 | 1–2 | 1–1 | 4–1 | 0–0 | 3–3 | 4–3 | 3–0 | 0–2 | 1–1 | 1–0 |
| Breiðablik | 2–0 | — | 4–5 | 1–1 | 1–4 | 1–1 | 1–1 | 3–3 | 2–1 | 2–1 | 1–0 | 3–1 |
| FH | 0–0 | 2–0 | — | 2–2 | 3–2 | 1–1 | 5–0 | 2–2 | 1–1 | 3–0 | 2–0 | 2–2 |
| Fram | 3–0 | 4–2 | 2–0 | — | 0–1 | 2–0 | 1–2 | 0–1 | 1–1 | 2–1 | 1–0 | 2–2 |
| ÍA | 3–1 | 3–0 | 1–3 | 0–1 | — | 0–3 | 3–0 | 1–0 | 0–3 | 2–2 | 0–2 | 0–1 |
| ÍBV | 1–2 | 0–2 | 2–1 | 3–1 | 2–0 | — | 0–0 | 2–1 | 1–0 | 4–1 | 0–2 | 0–0 |
| KA | 1–0 | 0–1 | 3–2 | 2–0 | 2–0 | 1–0 | — | 2–2 | 1–1 | 2–5 | 4–1 | 0–2 |
| KR | 2–1 | 1–1 | 3–2 | 2–3 | 5–0 | 4–1 | 1–2 | — | 1–2 | 3–3 | 2–1 | 0–7 |
| Stjarnan | 4–1 | 1–4 | 2–1 | 2–0 | 2–1 | 2–3 | 3–2 | 4–2 | — | 3–2 | 2–1 | 2–2 |
| Valur | 4–3 | 2–1 | 3–1 | 2–1 | 6–1 | 3–0 | 3–1 | 6–1 | 1–2 | — | 1–1 | 1–1 |
| Vestri | 2–0 | 0–1 | 1–0 | 3–2 | 0–2 | 2–0 | 1–0 | 1–1 | 3–1 | 0–2 | — | 0–1 |
| Víkingur Reykjavík | 2–1 | 2–2 | 3–1 | 3–2 | 2–1 | 2–0 | 4–0 | 3–2 | 2–4 | 1–2 | 4–1 | — |

Source: KSI (in Icelandic), Soccerway
Legend: Blue = home team win; Yellow = draw; Red = away team win.

== Championship Round ==
=== League table ===
| Pos | Team | Pld | W | D | L | GF | GA | GD | Pts | Qualification |
|---|---|---|---|---|---|---|---|---|---|---|
| 1 | Víkingur Reykjavík (C) | 27 | 17 | 6 | 4 | 58 | 31 | +27 | 57 | Qualification for the Champions League first qualifying round |
| 2 | Valur | 27 | 13 | 6 | 8 | 61 | 46 | +15 | 45 | Qualification for the Conference League second qualifying round |
| 3 | Stjarnan | 27 | 12 | 6 | 9 | 50 | 45 | +5 | 42 | Qualification for the Conference League first qualifying round |
| 4 | Breiðablik | 27 | 11 | 9 | 7 | 46 | 42 | +4 | 42 | |
| 5 | Fram | 27 | 10 | 6 | 11 | 41 | 40 | +1 | 36 | |
| 6 | FH | 27 | 8 | 9 | 10 | 49 | 46 | +3 | 33 | |

Source: KSI (in Icelandic), Soccerway
Rules for classification: 1) Points; 2) Goal difference; 3) Goals scored; 4) Head-to-head points; 5) Head-to-head goal difference; 6) Head-to-head goals scored; 7) Head-to-head away goals scored; 8) Play-off (only for deciding champion); 9) Draw.
(C) Champions

=== Results ===
Teams play each other once for the third time (either at home or away) for a total of 5 games each.

| Home \ Away | BRE | FH | FRA | STJ | VAL | VÍK |
|---|---|---|---|---|---|---|
| Breiðablik | — | — | 3–1 | — | — | 1–2 |
| FH | 1–1 | — | 3–4 | — | — | — |
| Fram | — | — | — | 1–1 | 2–0 | — |
| Stjarnan | 2–3 | 0–0 | — | — | — | 2–3 |
| Valur | 1–1 | 4–4 | — | 3–2 | — | — |
| Víkingur Reykjavík | — | 2–0 | 2–1 | — | 2–0 | — |

Source: KSI (in Icelandic), Soccerway
Legend: Blue = home team win; Yellow = draw; Red = away team win.

== Relegation Round ==
=== League table ===
| Pos | Team | Pld | W | D | L | GF | GA | GD | Pts | Qualification or relegation |
|---|---|---|---|---|---|---|---|---|---|---|
| 1 | KA | 27 | 11 | 6 | 10 | 45 | 49 | −4 | 39 | |
| 2 | ÍA | 27 | 11 | 1 | 15 | 37 | 50 | −13 | 34 | |
| 3 | ÍBV | 27 | 9 | 6 | 12 | 34 | 37 | −3 | 33 | |
| 4 | KR | 27 | 8 | 7 | 12 | 55 | 62 | −7 | 31 | |
| 5 | Vestri (R) | 27 | 8 | 5 | 14 | 26 | 44 | −18 | 29 | Qualification for the Europa League first qualifying round and relegation to the 1. deild karla (Note: Vestri qualified for the Europa League first qualifying round as the 2025 Icelandic Men's Football Cup winners.) |
| 6 | Afturelding (R) | 27 | 6 | 9 | 12 | 36 | 46 | −10 | 27 | Relegation to the 1. deild karla |

Source: KSI (in Icelandic), Soccerway
Rules for classification: 1) Points; 2) Goal difference; 3) Goals scored; 4) Head-to-head points; 5) Head-to-head goal difference; 6) Head-to-head goals scored; 7) Head-to-head away goals scored; 8) Play-off (only for deciding champion); 9) Draw.
(R) Relegated

=== Results ===
Teams play each other once for the third time (either at home or away) for a total of 5 games each.

| Home \ Away | AFT | ÍA | ÍBV | KA | KR | VES |
|---|---|---|---|---|---|---|
| Afturelding | — | — | — | 3–2 | — | 1–1 |
| ÍA | 1–0 | — | — | — | 3–2 | — |
| ÍBV | 1–1 | 0–2 | — | 3–4 | — | — |
| KA | — | 5–1 | — | — | 4–2 | 1–1 |
| KR | 2–2 | — | 2–1 | — | — | — |
| Vestri | — | 0–4 | 0–5 | — | 1–5 | — |

Source: KSI (in Icelandic), Soccerway
Legend: Blue = home team win; Yellow = draw; Red = away team win.

== Season statistics ==
=== Top scorers ===
| Rank | Player | Club | Goals |
|---|---|---|---|
| 1 | (Denmark) Patrick Pedersen | Valur | 18 |
| 2 | (Iceland) Sigurður Bjartur Hallsson | FH | 16 |
| 3 | (Iceland) Aron Sigurðarson | KR | 14 |
| 3 | (Iceland) Örvar Eggertsson | Stjarnan | 14 |
| 3 | (Iceland) Eiður Gauti Sæbjörnsson | KR | 14 |
| 6 | (Iceland) Hallgrímur Mar Steingrímsson | KA | 13 |
| 7 | (Iceland) Andri Rúnar Bjarnason | Stjarnan | 12 |
| 7 | (Iceland) Hrannar Snær Magnússon | Afturelding | 12 |
| 9 | (Iceland) Tryggvi Hrafn Haraldsson | Valur | 11 |
| 10 | (Iceland) Viktor Jónsson | ÍA | 10 |
| 10 | (Denmark) Nicolaj Hansen | Víkingur | 10 |
| 10 | (Denmark) Tobias Thomsen | Breiðablik | 10 |

=== Hat-tricks ===
| Player | For | Against | Result | Date |
|---|---|---|---|---|
| (Iceland) Kristófer Ingi Kristinsson | Breiðablik | Stjarnan | 4–1 (A) | 27 June 2025 |
| (Iceland) Valdimar Þór Ingimundarson | Víkingur | KR | 7–0 (A) | 14 September 2025 |
| (Iceland) Hermann Þór Ragnarsson | ÍBV | Vestri | 5–0 (A) | 28 September 2025 |
| (Iceland) Sigurður Bjartur Hallsson | FH | Valur | 4–4 (A) | 19 October 2025 |
| (Iceland) Sigurður Bjartur Hallsson | FH | Fram | 3–4 (H) | 25 October 2025 |

=== Clean sheets ===
| Rank | Player | Club | Clean sheets |
|---|---|---|---|
| 1 | (Iceland) Ingvar Jónsson | Víkingur | 8 |
| 1 | (Iceland) Árni Marinó Einarsson | ÍA | 8 |
| 3 | (Poland) Marcel Zapytowski | ÍBV | 7 |
| 4 | (Netherlands) Guy Smit | Vestri | 6 |
| 4 | (Denmark) Mathias Rosenørn | FH | 6 |
| 4 | (Iceland) Viktor Freyr Sigurðsson | Fram | 6 |
| 7 | (Iceland) Steinþór Már Auðunsson | KA | 5 |
| 7 | (Iceland) Anton Ari Einarsson | Breiðablik | 5 |
| 9 | (Iceland) Jökull Andrésson | Afturelding | 4 |
| 10 | (Iceland) Frederik Schram | Valur | 3 |
| 10 | (Iceland) Árni Snær Ólafsson | Stjarnan | 3 |

=== Discipline ===
==== Player ====
- Most yellow cards: 10
  - (Iceland) Tómas Orri Róbertsson (FH)
  - (Iceland) Aron Þórður Albertsson (KR)
  - (Iceland) Birgir Baldvinsson (KA)
- Most red cards: 1
  - 22 players (Various)

==== Club ====
- Most yellow cards: 75
  - Vestri
- Most red cards: 4
  - FH

== Attendances ==
| # | Club | Average |
|---|---|---|
| 1 | KR | 1,443 |
| 2 | Víkingur | 1,351 |
| 3 | Breiðablik | 1,111 |
| 4 | ÍA | 890 |
| 5 | Stjarnan | 881 |
| 6 | FH | 862 |
| 7 | Fram | 833 |
| 8 | Valur | 782 |
| 9 | Afturelding | 738 |
| 10 | KA | 565 |
| 11 | ÍB | 459 |
| 12 | Vestri | 354 |
