= Gylfi Sigurðsson =

Icelandic footballer (born 1989)

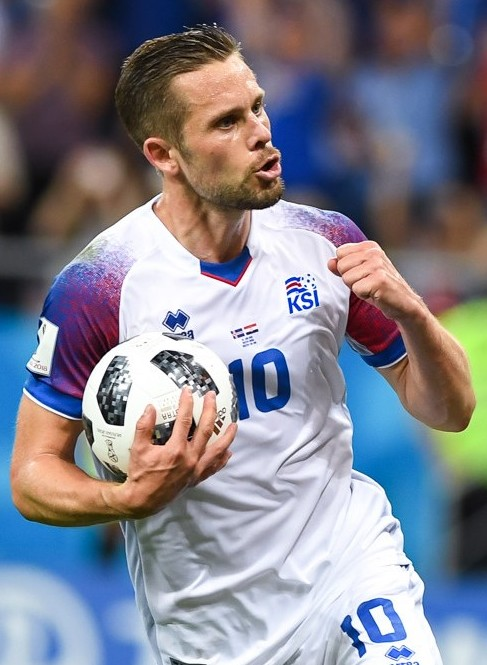
- Gylfi with Iceland at the 2018 FIFA World Cup

Personal information
- Full name: Gylfi Þór Sigurðsson
- Date of birth: 8 September 1989 (age 37)
- Place of birth: Reykjavík, Iceland
- Height: 1.86 m (6 ft 1 in)
- Position: Attacking midfielder

Team information
- Current team: Víkingur Reykjavík
- Number: 10

Youth career
- –2003: FH
- 2003–2005: Breiðablik
- 2005–2008: Reading

Senior career*
Years	Team	Apps	(Gls)
2008–2010	Reading	18	(4)
2008	→ Shrewsbury Town (loan)	5	(1)
2009	→ Crewe Alexandra (loan)	15	(3)
2010–2012	TSG Hoffenheim	36	(9)
2012	→ Swansea City (loan)	18	(7)
2012–2014	Tottenham Hotspur	58	(8)
2014–2017	Swansea City	106	(27)
2017–2022	Everton	136	(25)
2023–2024	Lyngby	5	(0)
2024	Valur	16	(9)
2025–	Víkingur Reykjavík	46	(15)

International career^{‡}
2005	Iceland U17	3	(2)
2006–2007	Iceland U19	15	(8)
2007–2011	Iceland U21	14	(6)
2010–	Iceland	92	(28)
- * Club domestic league appearances and goals as of 1 November 2026 ‡ National team caps and goals as of 19:15, 16 November 2026 (UTC)

Gylfi Þór Sigurðsson (Icelandic pronunciation: [ˈcɪlvɪ ˈθouːr̥ ˈsɪːɣʏrðsɔn]; transliterated as Gylfi Thor Sigurdsson; born 8 September 1989) is an Icelandic professional footballer who plays as an attacking midfielder for Besta deild karla club Víkingur Reykjavík and the Iceland national team.

Gylfi began his professional career with Reading in the Championship and in 2010, was sold to TSG Hoffenheim, which was Reading's biggest sale at the time. He was voted Player of the Season for two consecutive seasons: for Reading in 2009–10 and for Hoffenheim in 2010–11. After a season back in English football with Swansea City, he joined Tottenham Hotspur for a reported £8 million transfer fee. In 2014, he moved back to Swansea as part of an exchange for Ben Davies. In 2017, he transferred to Everton for a then club-record transfer fee of £40 million, and remained there for five years. In 2021 he was arrested on suspicion of child sexual offences, and was freed without charge in 2023. He then resumed his career with Lyngby in Denmark and Valur in Iceland.

Gylfi made his debut for Iceland in 2010. He played for the team at their first major tournament, UEFA Euro 2016, where it reached the quarter-finals. He also played at his national team's first ever FIFA World Cup in 2018. As of 16 November 2026, Gylfi has obtained 92 caps and scored 28 goals, making him Iceland's all-time top scorer.

== Club career ==
=== Reading ===
Born in Reykjavík, Gylfi played for hometown side FH before joining Breiðablik and was an Icelandic under-17 international. He had spent time on trial with Preston North End before signing for Reading on an academy scholarship on 1 October 2005. He spent three years playing for the youth and reserve teams. Prior to the 2007–08 season, he and five other youngsters were given professional contracts.

==== 2008–09 ====
Ahead of the 2008–09 season, Gylfi was assigned the number 34 shirt for Reading. He was an unused substitute in the club's 2–1 away win at Dagenham & Redbridge in the first round of the League Cup on 12 August. Two weeks later, he made his debut in the next round against Luton Town, entering the match as a 59th-minute substitute for James Harper in a 5–1 win at the Madejski Stadium. He scored in Reading's penalty shoot-out loss away to Stoke City in the third round after entering as a substitute.

To gain first-team experience, Gylfi signed for Shrewsbury Town on a one-month loan spell on 16 October. Two days later, he scored on his league debut against AFC Bournemouth in a 4–1 win at the New Meadow. He made a total of six appearances during his time at Shrewsbury, scoring one goal. He returned to his parent club and featured in Reading's 2–0 loss to Cardiff City in the FA Cup third round on 3 January 2009. On 27 February, he joined Crewe Alexandra on an emergency loan move. Two days later, he made his debut against Brighton away, scoring in the 89th minute in a 4–0 win. On 24 March, his loan was extended until the end of the season. He scored two further goals for Crewe, against Milton Keynes Dons and Cheltenham Town respectively, but could not prevent the club's relegation to League Two.

==== 2009–10 ====
Gylfi scored his first Reading goal against Burton Albion from 35 yards out in a League Cup first round tie at home on 11 August 2009. He scored his first league goal for Reading in a 3–2 defeat at Peterborough United on 19 September 2009. Gylfi was a major contributor in Reading's extraordinary 2009–10 FA Cup run which included wins over Premier League sides Liverpool, Burnley and West Bromwich Albion. On 13 January 2010, in the third round of the FA Cup against Liverpool, he scored a penalty in injury time to make the score 1–1 and force extra time. Reading went on to win the match 2–1. He scored the winning goal in the 87th minute against Burnley in the fourth round. In the fifth round, he scored the winning goal against West Brom for a 3–2 victory in extra time. In April 2010, Gylfi won the Championship Player of the Month Award for March, edging Peter Løvenkrands of Newcastle United, Graham Dorrans of West Brom and Adel Taarabt of Queens Park Rangers, scoring five goals in six matches that month. On 2 May, Gylfi scored against Preston North End in the final match of the season. Before the match, Gylfi was named as the 2009–10 Reading Player of the Season, surpassing Jimmy Kébé and Ryan Bertrand, who finished second and third respectively.

Gylfi finished the season with 20 goals in 44 matches in all competitions. His performances and his young age prompted several Premier League clubs to enquire over his availability, but he committed his future to Reading when he signed a three-year contract in May 2010.

==== 2010–11 ====
Gylfi scored his first goal of the 2010–11 season in the first match of the season when he "skipped past two players before smashing in a 25-yard equaliser" against Scunthorpe United in a 2–1 home loss. He followed this on 28 August with a short-range chip in the 22nd minute away at Leicester City. The evening after the match, the Icelandic media reported Gylfi was to travel to Germany the following Monday to undergo a medical at TSG Hoffenheim ahead of a transfer. On 31 August, he completed a transfer to 1899 Hoffenheim, with Reading reporting the fee received exceeded their previous club record sale of £6.5 million from the sale of Kevin Doyle.

=== TSG Hoffenheim ===
Gylfi made his debut for TSG Hoffenheim on 10 September 2010, coming on as a substitute with 13 minutes to go in a 2–0 win over Schalke 04. One week later, he scored his first goal for Hoffenheim in a 2–2 draw with 1. FC Kaiserslautern after coming on as a 77th-minute substitute. He scored with his first touch, a 20-yard free-kick that levelled the match. His second goal for the club was another free-kick, from 25 yards out against Mainz 05 in a 4–2 away defeat. He added another two goals to his tally in Hoffenheim's home win against Hannover 96, one of which was from the penalty spot. On 25 May 2011, Gylfi was voted as 1899 Hoffenheim's fans' Player of the Season, despite only starting 13 matches. He finished the season with ten goals and two assists.

During the first half of the 2011–12 season, Gylfi fell out of favour with the club's new manager, making just seven league appearances and was linked with a move away from the club.

==== Loan to Swansea City ====
On 1 January 2012, it was announced Gylfi would join Premier League club Swansea City on loan for the rest of the season. He made his Premier League debut for Swansea on 15 January, coming on at half-time and setting up the winning goal in a 3–2 win over Arsenal. On 4 February, Gylfi scored his first goal for the club in a 2–1 win against West Bromwich Albion. He also created Swansea's other goal for Danny Graham, taking his tally to three assists in four matches. On 3 March, he scored two goals in a 2–0 victory away at Wigan Athletic, his first from a free-kick. Two weeks later, he scored another brace in a 3–0 away win against Fulham. He scored his next goal at White Hart Lane in his team's 3–1 defeat by Tottenham Hotspur on 1 April.

As a result of his fine form, Gylfi was named the Premier League Player of the Month for March, the first Icelander to win the award. His next goal came in a 3–0 victory over Blackburn Rovers that put the club on 42 points for the season.

On 28 May, Swansea agreed a £6.8 million fee with 1899 Hoffenheim for the permanent transfer of Gylfi, subject to him passing a medical. However, following Swansea manager Brendan Rodgers' move to Liverpool, the deal collapsed, despite Huw Jenkins keeping hope in the deal alight. In 18 Premier League matches during his loan spell for Swansea, Gylfi scored seven goals and added four assists.

=== Tottenham Hotspur ===
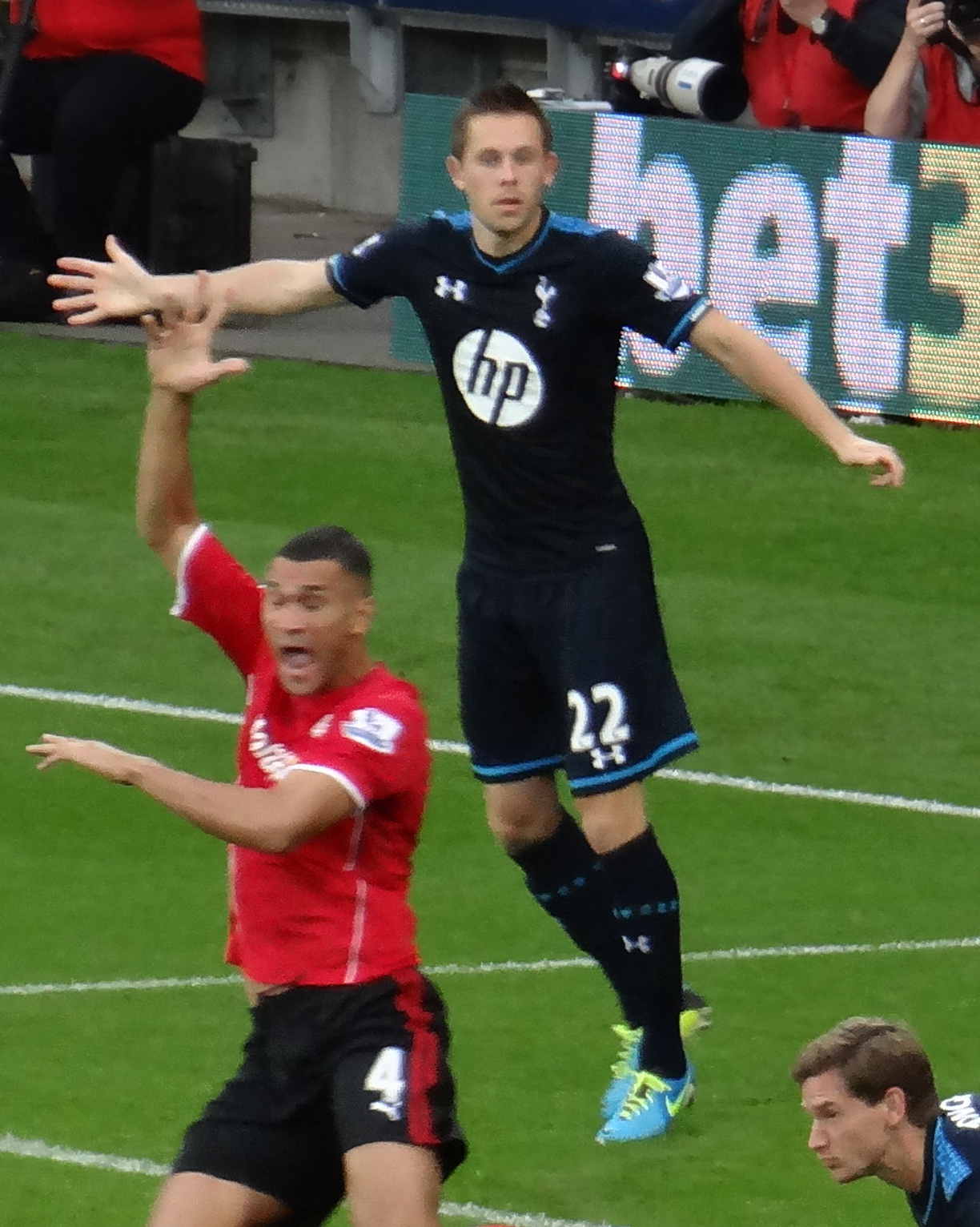
Gylfi playing for Tottenham Hotspur in 2013

On 4 July 2012, Gylfi joined Tottenham Hotspur from 1899 Hoffenheim for a reported £8 million transfer fee. He was the first signing for newly appointed Spurs manager André Villas-Boas. On 18 July, he scored his first goal for the club in a friendly against Stevenage after coming on as a second-half substitute. On 26 September, he scored his first competitive goal for the club in a League Cup third round tie away against Carlisle United, closing the scoring in a 3–0 win.

Brian McDermott confirmed Reading made three unsuccessful bids to bring Gylfi back to his former club during the January 2013 transfer window, including a club record offer on deadline day thought by BBC Sport to be around £10 million. On 25 February, Gylfi scored his first Premier League goal for Tottenham, the second goal in a 3–2 win against West Ham United. In the following match, a 2–1 North London derby win against Arsenal, he provided the assist for Gareth Bale.

In the 2013–14 season, Gylfi scored twice in a 2–0 win against Norwich City on 14 September 2013. This win took Spurs up to second in the Premier League table. Gylfi's momentum in the Tottenham team continued on 28 September 2013, scoring in a 1–1 home draw against Chelsea.

=== Return to Swansea City ===
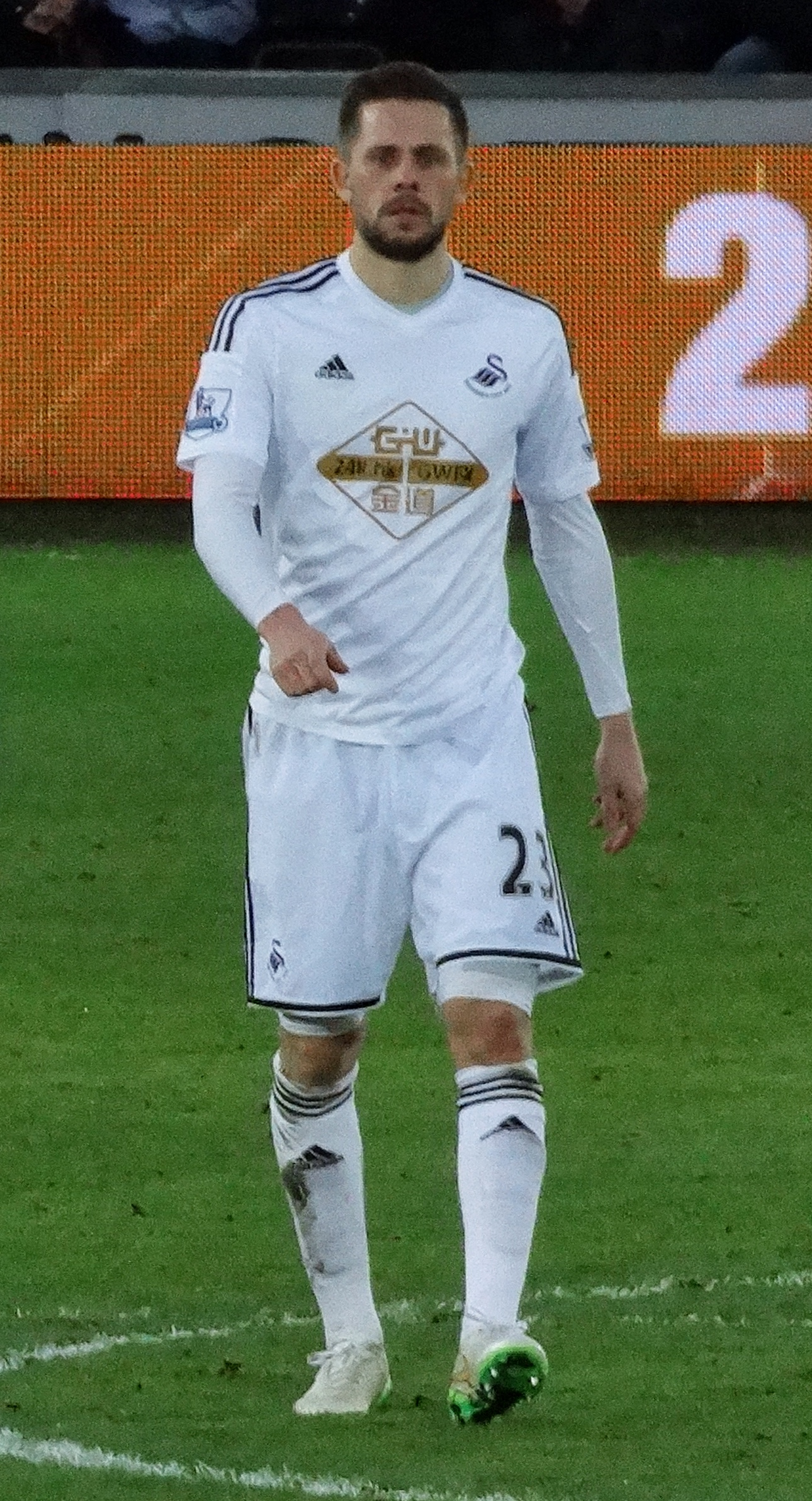
Gylfi playing for Swansea City in 2015

In July 2014, Tottenham announced a deal had been reached with Swansea City for Gylfi to re-join his former club, with Swansea left-back Ben Davies joining Spurs. On the move, Gylfi said, "I really enjoyed my time here last time. I know the club, I know the manager, I know the players and I obviously know the fans and the city as well, so that wasn't that difficult for me." In the opening match of the 2014–15 season, he set up the opener and scored the winning goal as Swansea defeated Manchester United 2–1 at Old Trafford, making this the first time the Red Devils have lost their opening home game since 1972. Gylfi continued his good start to his Swansea return with another three assists in his next two matches. In a home match against Arsenal on 9 November 2014, Gylfi curled a free-kick over the wall and into the corner of the net from 25 yards to equalise in an eventual 2–1 win. Gylfi scored in a 4–1 away defeat against Liverpool at Anfield on 29 December.

On 17 January 2015, a wayward pass by Gylfi allowed Chelsea's Oscar to score after 50 seconds in an eventual 5–0 home defeat for Swansea. A week later, he scored and was sent off in added time at the end of a 3–1 defeat away to Blackburn Rovers in an FA Cup fourth round tie, with Swansea already having been down to ten men after the earlier dismissal of Kyle Bartley.

Amidst rumours of a £25 million move to Everton, Gylfi signed a new four-year contract with Swansea on 2 August 2016. He scored his first goal of the 2016–17 season on 11 September against Chelsea with a second-half penalty in a game which finished 2–2. He ended the season with 9 goals and 13 assists which helped the Swans avoid relegation. In summer 2017, Gylfi refused to participate in Swansea's pre-season tour of the United States, proclaiming he was not in right frame of mind to go with the club because of uncertainty over his future.

=== Everton ===
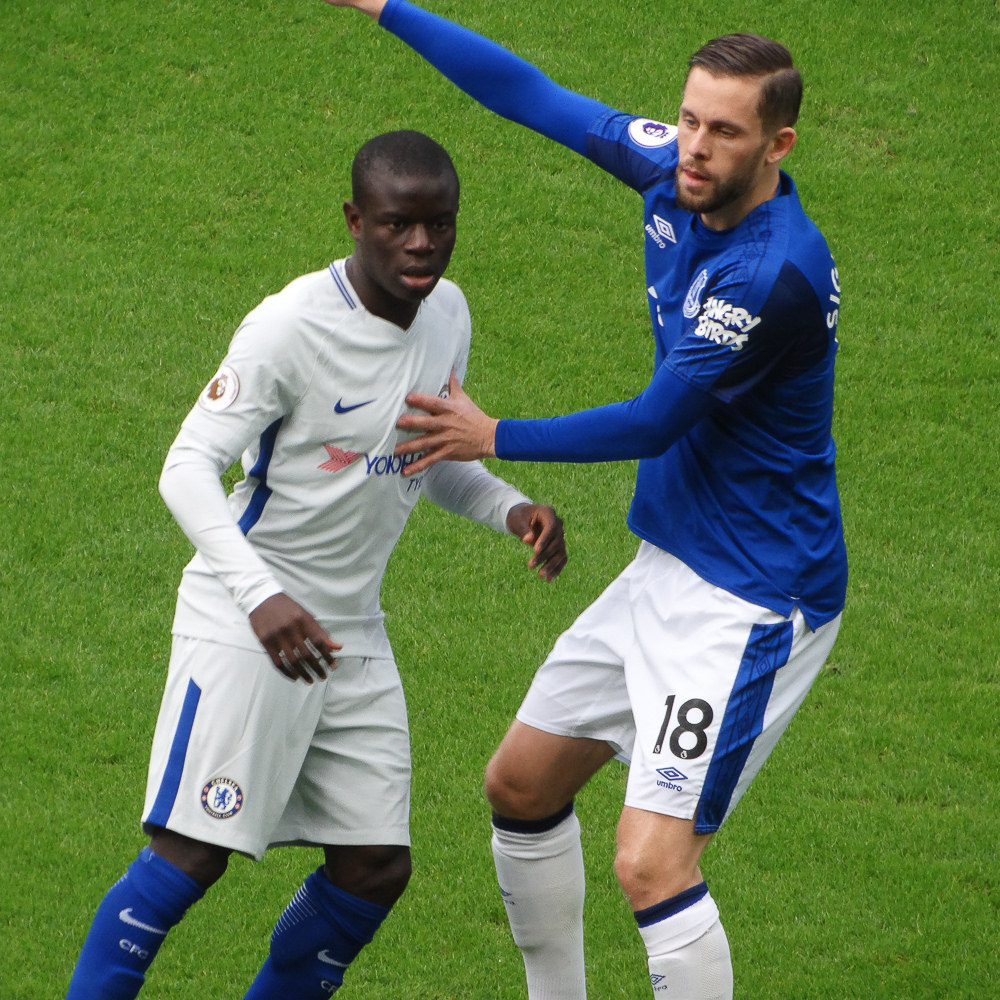
Gylfi (right) playing for Everton in 2017

On 16 August 2017, Gylfi signed for fellow Premier league side Everton for a reported £40 million transfer fee (with £5 million in potential add-ons), a club-record deal. Eight days later, he scored his first goal for Everton while making his full debut, with a shot from 50 yards in the UEFA Europa League play-off round second leg against Hajduk Split. On 26 November 2017, he scored his first Premier League goal in an Everton shirt against Southampton, but lost the match 4–1. He ended the 2017–18 season with 6 goals and 5 assists in 31 appearances.

Gylfi started the 2018–19 season with Everton with an assist to Michael Keane in a friendly match against Valencia, while losing the match 3–2. On 29 September 2018, he scored his first brace with the club in a 3–0 victory against Fulham. On 26 December 2018, he assisted and scored a penalty in a 5–1 victory against Burnley.

Gylfi scored his 100th goal in English football during Everton's second round EFL Cup tie against Salford City on 16 September 2020. On 20 February 2021, he scored a penalty in a 2–0 league win over Liverpool at Anfield, sealing Everton's first away win over their rivals since September 1999.

On 10 September 2021, Gylfi was left out of Everton's final Premier League squad for the 2021–22 season. He left the club in June 2022 when his contract expired.

=== Lyngby BK ===
In June 2023, Gylfi was in talks to join D.C. United, managed by his former Everton teammate Wayne Rooney. On 31 August 2023, he joined Danish Superliga side Lyngby Boldklub on a one-year deal. He made his debut on 22 September in his first professional game for over two years, as a 70th-minute substitute for compatriot Sævar Atli Magnússon in a 1–1 home draw with Vejle Boldklub.

By mutual agreement, Lyngby confirmed on 21 January 2024 that Gylfi's contract had been terminated as he was battling back from injury. He had waived his salary during his rehabilitation, which could only happen if the agreement was terminated. The player and the club had agreed that he could sign a new deal after his recovery, but following a managerial switch, the club decided to not re-sign him.

=== Valur ===
On 14 March 2024, Gylfi signed a two-year contract with Valur, thus joining a Besta deild karla team for the first time in his senior career. He made his debut on 1 April in the Icelandic Super Cup, playing the first half against Víkingur, who won on penalties. Six days later in the first game of the league season, he scored to conclude a 2–0 home win over ÍA.

=== Víkingur Reykjavík ===
On 18 February 2025, Gylfi signed for fellow Besta deild karla club Víkingur Reykjavík.

== International career ==
=== Youth ===
Gylfi took part in the 2008 U19 European Championship qualifying, scoring twice in qualification and twice in the elite round, but Iceland lost out to group winners Bulgaria by three points and missed out on the finals. In November 2007, Gylfi made his under-21 debut for Iceland, playing 30 minutes against Germany in a 3–0 loss. He made his first appearance in the 2009 European Under-21 Championship qualifying four days later, coming as an extra-time substitute, and played in the remaining matches. In Iceland's last match, he scored the opener against Slovakia, but Slovakia's Miroslav Stoch equalised to make it 1–1. Iceland failed to qualify for the play-offs but made a bright start to the 2011 campaign. He made his campaign debut in October against San Marino, scoring two goals within 16 minutes in a 6–0 thrashing.

=== Senior ===
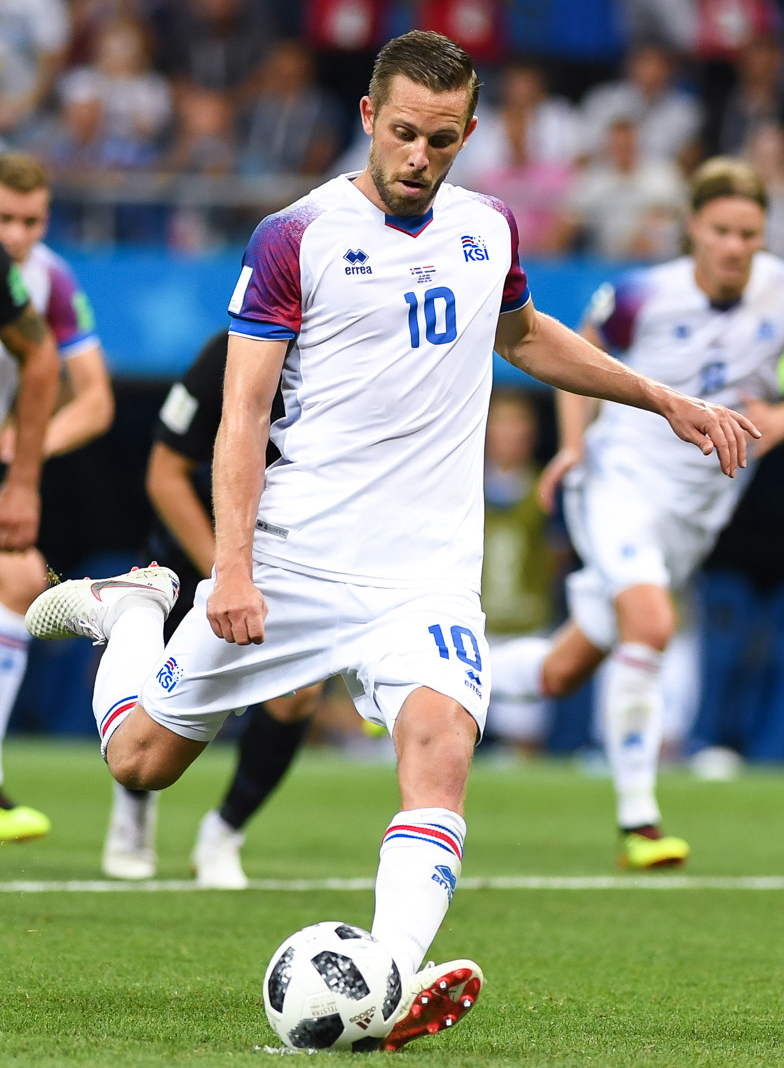
Gylfi playing for Iceland at the 2018 FIFA World Cup

In May 2010, Gylfi made his full Iceland debut in a convincing 4–0 win over Andorra and provided the assist for the second goal from a free-kick. Gylfi also helped Iceland's U21 side reach the 2011 UEFA European Under-21 Championship, playing in both play-off legs against Scotland as Iceland won 4–2 on aggregate. In the second leg, Gylfi scored two second-half goals to ensure Iceland won the match 2–1.

On 13 October 2014, Gylfi scored both goals (one of which was a penalty) as Iceland defeated the Netherlands in a UEFA Euro 2016 qualifying match. In the reverse fixture the following 3 September at the Amsterdam Arena, he converted another spot-kick for the only goal of the match, after Gregory van der Wiel fouled Birkir Bjarnason.

Gylfi was selected for UEFA Euro 2016. On 18 June, he scored Iceland's goal in their second group stage match against Hungary, a 1–1 draw at the Stade Vélodrome.

In May 2018, Gylfi was named in Iceland's 23-man squad for the 2018 FIFA World Cup in Russia. During the group stage match against Croatia, he scored a penalty in the 76th minute, but Iceland lost 2–1 and were eliminated at the group stage.

Gylfi scored twice against Romania on 8 October 2020, earning Iceland a place in the play-offs for the UEFA Euro 2020 finals.

Gylfi did not play for Iceland between 2021 and 2023. After the British police investigation into him was closed without charge in April 2023, new Iceland manager Åge Hareide said "He was possibly the best player Iceland has ever had. He ended up in a difficult position. I hope he puts on his shoes again. All teams can benefit from a player with his abilities". The chair of the Football Association of Iceland said that there was nothing to impede the player representing the country again.

On 4 October 2023, nearly three years since his last appearance for the national team, Gylfi was called up for UEFA Euro 2024 qualification matches against Luxembourg and Liechtenstein on 13 and 16 October respectively. He scored a brace in the Liechtenstein match and reached his 27th international goal, becoming Iceland's all-time top scorer.

== Personal life ==
In June 2019, Gylfi married Alexandra Ívarsdóttir, who had been Miss Iceland in 2008. They had been dating from 2010. Together they have two children. Through his sister, he is the uncle of Karólína Lea Vilhjálmsdóttir of the Iceland women's national football team.

On 16 July 2021, he was arrested "on suspicion of child sex offences" and was released on bail while investigations continued, stated Greater Manchester Police (GMP) without naming the player. Everton stated that they "suspended a first-team player pending a police investigation", but did not confirm if it was the same player arrested by GMP. Icelandic newspaper Morgunblaðið reported that the player arrested for alleged child sex offences was Gylfi. Danish beverage State Energy, which had signed Gylfi only a month earlier, removed all advertising with his image on it.

In October 2022, with Gylfi not charged but still under a travel ban, politician Njáll Trausti Friðbertsson said that he would discuss the player's case with the Foreign Affairs Committee. On 14 April 2023, Greater Manchester Police confirmed that no further action would be taken against Gylfi. Gylfi's lawyer said that the player would not sue British authorities over the investigation.

== Career statistics ==
=== Club ===
As of match played 31 May 2026

Appearances and goals by club, season and competition
Club	Season	League			National cup (Note: Includes FA Cup, DFB-Pokal, Danish Cup, Icelandic Cup)		League cup (Note: Includes Football League/EFL Cup, Icelandic League Cup)		Europe		Other		Total	
Club	Season	Division	Apps	Goals	Apps	Goals	Apps	Goals	Apps	Goals	Apps	Goals	Apps	Goals
Reading	2008–09	Championship	0	0	1	0	2	0	—		—		3	0
Reading	2009–10	Championship	38	16	5	3	1	1	—		—		44	20
Reading	2010–11	Championship	4	2	—		0	0	—		—		4	2
Reading	Total		42	18	6	3	3	1	—		—		51	22
Shrewsbury Town (loan)	2008–09	League Two	5	1	—		—		—		1 (Note: Appearance in Football League Trophy)	0	6	1
Crewe Alexandra (loan)	2008–09	League One	15	3	—		—		—		—		15	3
TSG Hoffenheim	2010–11	Bundesliga	29	9	3	1	—		—		—		32	10
TSG Hoffenheim	2011–12	Bundesliga	7	0	0	0	—		—		—		7	0
TSG Hoffenheim	Total		36	9	3	1	—		—		—		39	10
Swansea City (loan)	2011–12	Premier League	18	7	1	0	0	0	—		—		19	7
Tottenham Hotspur	2012–13	Premier League	33	3	2	0	2	1	11 (Note: Appearances in UEFA Europa League)	3	—		48	7
Tottenham Hotspur	2013–14	Premier League	25	5	0	0	2	1	8	0	—		35	6
Tottenham Hotspur	Total		58	8	2	0	4	2	19	3	—		83	13
Swansea City	2014–15	Premier League	32	7	1	1	2	1	—		—		35	9
Swansea City	2015–16	Premier League	36	11	0	0	1	0	—		—		37	11
Swansea City	2016–17	Premier League	38	9	1	0	1	1	—		—		40	10
Swansea City	Total		106	27	2	1	4	2	—		—		112	30
Everton	2017–18	Premier League	27	4	1	1	0	0	5	1	—		33	6
Everton	2018–19	Premier League	38	13	2	0	1	1	—		—		41	14
Everton	2019–20	Premier League	35	2	1	0	2	1	—		—		38	3
Everton	2020–21	Premier League	36	6	4	1	4	1	—		—		44	8
Everton	2021–22	Premier League	0	0	0	0	0	0	—		—		0	0
Everton	Total		136	25	8	2	7	3	5	1	—		156	31
Lyngby	2023–24	Danish Superliga	5	0	1	2	—		—		—		6	2
Valur	2024	Besta deild karla	16	9	2	0	1	0	—		4 (Note: One appearance in Icelandic Super Cup, three appearances and two goals in Besta deild karla championship round)	2	23	11
Valur	2025	Besta deild karla	—		—		2	0	3 (Note: Appearances in UEFA Conference League)	0	—		5	0
Valur	Total		16	9	2	0	3	0	3	0	4	2	28	11
Víkingur Reykjavík	2025	Besta deild karla	19	4	1	0	—		—		5 (Note: Appearances in Besta deild karla championship round)	2	25	6
Víkingur Reykjavík	2026	Besta deild karla	8	4	0	0	0	0	5	0	—		13	4
Víkingur Reykjavík	Total		27	8	1	0	0	0	5	0	5	2	38	10
Career total			464	115	26	9	21	8	32	4	10	4	553	140

=== International ===
As of match played 16 November 2026

Appearances and goals by national team and year
National team	Year	Apps	Goals
Iceland	2010	3	0
Iceland	2011	3	1
Iceland	2012	8	1
Iceland	2013	8	3
Iceland	2014	6	4
Iceland	2015	7	3
Iceland	2016	13	2
Iceland	2017	7	4
Iceland	2018	9	2
Iceland	2019	10	2
Iceland	2020	4	3
Iceland	2021	0	0
Iceland	2022	0	0
Iceland	2023	2	2
Iceland	2024	3	0
Iceland	2025	0	0
Iceland	2026	9	1
Total		92	28

As of match played 31 March 2026
Scores and results list Iceland's goal tally first, score column indicates score after each Gylfi goal.

List of international goals scored by Gylfi Sigurðsson
No.	Date	Venue	Cap	Opponent	Score	Result	Competition
1	7 October 2011	Estádio do Dragão, Porto, Portugal	6	Portugal	3–5	3–5	UEFA Euro 2012 qualification
2	12 October 2012	Qemal Stafa Stadium, Tirana, Albania	13	Albania	2–1	2–1	2014 FIFA World Cup qualification
3	22 March 2013	Stožice Stadium, Ljubljana, Slovenia	16	Slovenia	1–1	2–1	2014 FIFA World Cup qualification
4	22 March 2013	Stožice Stadium, Ljubljana, Slovenia	16	Slovenia	2–1	2–1	2014 FIFA World Cup qualification
5	11 October 2013	Laugardalsvöllur, Reykjavík, Iceland	19	Cyprus	2–0	2–0	2014 FIFA World Cup qualification
6	9 September 2014	Laugardalsvöllur, Reykjavík, Iceland	25	Turkey	2–0	3–0	UEFA Euro 2016 qualification
7	10 October 2014	Skonto Stadium, Riga, Latvia	26	Latvia	1–0	3–0	UEFA Euro 2016 qualification
8	13 October 2014	Laugardalsvöllur, Reykjavík, Iceland	27	Netherlands	1–0	2–0	UEFA Euro 2016 qualification
9	13 October 2014	Laugardalsvöllur, Reykjavík, Iceland	27	Netherlands	2–0	2–0	UEFA Euro 2016 qualification
10	3 September 2015	Amsterdam Arena, Amsterdam, Netherlands	31	Netherlands	1–0	1–0	UEFA Euro 2016 qualification
11	10 October 2015	Laugardalsvöllur, Reykjavík, Iceland	33	Latvia	2–0	2–2	UEFA Euro 2016 qualification
12	13 November 2015	National Stadium, Warsaw, Poland	35	Poland	1–0	2–4	Friendly
13	1 June 2016	Ullevaal Stadion, Oslo, Norway	38	Norway	2–3	2–3	Friendly
14	18 June 2016	Stade Vélodrome, Marseille, France	41	Hungary	1–0	1–1	UEFA Euro 2016
15	24 March 2017	Loro Boriçi Stadium, Shkodër, Albania	49	Kosovo	2–0	2–1	2018 FIFA World Cup qualification
16	5 September 2017	Laugardalsvöllur, Reykjavík, Iceland	52	Ukraine	1–0	2–0	2018 FIFA World Cup qualification
17	5 September 2017	Laugardalsvöllur, Reykjavík, Iceland	52	Ukraine	2–0	2–0	2018 FIFA World Cup qualification
18	9 October 2017	Laugardalsvöllur, Reykjavík, Iceland	54	Kosovo	1–0	2–0	2018 FIFA World Cup qualification
19	2 June 2018	Laugardalsvöllur, Reykjavík, Iceland	56	Norway	2–1	2–3	Friendly
20	26 June 2018	Rostov Arena, Rostov-on-Don, Russia	60	Croatia	1–1	1–2	2018 FIFA World Cup
21	10 September 2019	Elbasan Arena, Elbasan, Albania	70	Albania	1–1	2–4	UEFA Euro 2020 qualification
22	17 November 2019	Zimbru Stadium, Chișinău, Moldova	74	Moldova	2–1	2–1	UEFA Euro 2020 qualification
23	8 October 2020	Laugardalsvöllur, Reykjavík, Iceland	75	Romania	1–0	2–1	UEFA Euro 2020 qualification playoffs
24	8 October 2020	Laugardalsvöllur, Reykjavík, Iceland	75	Romania	2–0	2–1	UEFA Euro 2020 qualification playoffs
25	12 November 2020	Puskás Aréna, Budapest, Hungary	77	Hungary	1–0	1–2	UEFA Euro 2020 qualification playoffs
26	16 October 2023	Laugardalsvöllur, Reykjavík, Iceland	80	Liechtenstein	1–0	4–0	UEFA Euro 2024 qualification
27	16 October 2023	Laugardalsvöllur, Reykjavík, Iceland	80	Liechtenstein	3–0	4–0	UEFA Euro 2024 qualification
28	31 March 2026	BMO Field, Toronto, Canada	85	Haiti	1–0	1–1	Friendly

== Honours ==
Víkingur Reykjavik

- Besta-deild karla: 2025, 2026
- Meistarakeppni karla: 2026

Individual

- Premier League Player of the Month: March 2012
- Football League Championship Player of the Month: March 2010
- Reading Player of the Season: 2009–10
- Hoffenheim Player of the Season: 2010–11
- Icelandic Footballer of the Year: 2010, 2012, 2013, 2014, 2015, 2016, 2017, 2018, 2019
- Icelandic Sportsperson of the Year: 2013, 2016
- Swansea City Player of the Season: 2015–16, 2016–17
