= 2024 Besta deild karla =

Besta deild karla
- Season: 2024
- Dates: 6 April – 27 October 2024
- Champions: Breiðablik
- Relegated: Fylkir; HK
- Champions League: Breiðablik
- Conference League: KA; Valur; Víkingur Reykjavík
- Matches: 159
- Goals: 576 (3.62 per match)
- Top goalscorer: Benoný Breki Andrésson (21 goals)
- Biggest home win: ÍA 8-0 HK (6 July 2024)
- Biggest away win: Fylkir 0-6 Víkingur Reykjavík (17 September 2024)
- Highest scoring: ÍA 8-0 HK (6 July 2024); KR 3-5 Valur (4 June 2024)
- All statistics correct as of 27 October 2024.

The 2024 Besta deild karla was the 113th season of top-flight Icelandic Football. It was the third season following the league's rebrand as Besta deild karla.

== Teams ==
The league consisted of twelve teams: the top ten teams from the previous season, and two teams promoted from the 1. deild karla. Víkingur Reykjavík entered the season as defending champions after winning their seventh title during the previous season.

The promoted teams were 2023 1. deild karla champions ÍA (promoted after a single season absence), and play-off winners Vestri (promoted for the first time in their history). They replaced the 2023 Besta deild karla bottom two teams, ÍBV and Keflavík.

== Stadia and locations ==
Locations of the 2024 Besta deild karla teams

Team	Location	Stadium
Breiðablik	Kópavogur	Kópavogsvöllur
FH	Hafnarfjörður	Kaplakriki
Fram	Reykjavík	Laugardalsvöllur
Fylkir	Reykjavík	Floridana völlurinn
HK	Kópavogur	Kórinn
ÍA	Akranes	Norðurálsvöllurinn
KA	Akureyri	Akureyrarvöllur
KR	Reykjavík	Alvogenvöllurinn
Stjarnan	Garðabær	Samsung völlurinn
Valur	Reykjavík	Valsvöllur
Vestri	Ísafjörður	Kerecisvöllurinn
Víkingur Reykjavík	Reykjavík	Víkingsvöllur

== Regular season ==
=== League table ===
Pos	Team	Pld	W	D	L	GF	GA	GD	Pts	Qualification
1	Víkingur Reykjavík	22	15	4	3	56	23	+33	49	Qualification for the Championship Round
2	Breiðablik	22	15	4	3	53	28	+25	49	Qualification for the Championship Round
3	Valur	22	11	5	6	53	33	+20	38	Qualification for the Championship Round
4	ÍA	22	10	4	8	41	31	+10	34	Qualification for the Championship Round
5	Stjarnan	22	10	4	8	40	35	+5	34	Qualification for the Championship Round
6	FH	22	9	6	7	39	38	+1	33	Qualification for the Championship Round
7	Fram	22	7	6	9	31	32	−1	27	Qualification for the Relegation Round
8	KA	22	7	6	9	32	38	−6	27	Qualification for the Relegation Round
9	KR	22	5	6	11	35	46	−11	21	Qualification for the Relegation Round
10	HK	22	6	2	14	26	56	−30	20	Qualification for the Relegation Round
11	Vestri	22	4	6	12	22	43	−21	18	Qualification for the Relegation Round
12	Fylkir	22	4	5	13	26	51	−25	17	Qualification for the Relegation Round

Source: KSI (in Icelandic), Soccerway
Rules for classification: 1) Points; 2) Goal difference; 3) Goals scored; 4) Head-to-head points; 5) Head-to-head goal difference; 6) Head-to-head goals scored; 7) Head-to-head away goals scored; 8) Play-off (only for deciding champion); 9) Draw.

=== Results ===
Each team was originally scheduled to play home and away once against every other team for a total of 22 games each.

Home \ Away	BRE	FH	FRA	FYL	HK	ÍA	KA	KR	STJ	VAL	VES	VÍK
Breiðablik	—	2–0	3–1	3–0	5–3	1–1	2–1	4–2	2–1	2–3	4–0	1–1
FH	1–0	—	3–3	3–1	3–1	1–1	1–1	1–2	0–3	2–2	3–2	2–3
Fram	1–4	3–3	—	2–1	1–2	1–1	1–2	1–0	2–1	4–1	2–0	0–1
Fylkir	0–3	2–3	0–0	—	3–1	3–0	1–1	3–4	0–1	0–0	3–2	0–6
HK	0–2	0–2	1–0	0–2	—	0–4	1–2	3–2	4–3	1–2	1–1	3–1
ÍA	1–2	1–2	1–0	5–1	8–0	—	1–0	2–1	1–3	3–2	3–0	0–1
KA	2–3	2–3	3–2	4–2	1–1	2–3	—	1–1	1–1	1–0	0–1	1–0
KR	2–3	1–0	0–1	2–2	1–2	4–2	2–2	—	1–1	3–5	2–2	0–3
Stjarnan	2–2	4–2	1–1	2–0	2–0	4–1	5–0	1–3	—	1–0	1–0	0–4
Valur	0–2	2–2	1–1	4–0	5–1	2–0	3–1	4–1	5–1	—	3–1	2–2
Vestri	2–2	0–2	1–3	0–0	1–0	0–0	0–2	2–0	4–2	1–5	—	1–4
Víkingur Reykjavík	4–1	2–0	2–1	5–2	5–1	1–2	4–2	1–1	2–0	3–2	1–1	—

Source: KSI (in Icelandic), Soccerway
Legend: Blue = home team win; Yellow = draw; Red = away team win.

== Championship Round ==
=== League table ===
Pos	Team	Pld	W	D	L	GF	GA	GD	Pts	Qualification
1	Breiðablik (C)	27	19	5	3	63	31	+32	62	Qualification for the Champions League first qualifying round
2	Víkingur Reykjavík	27	18	5	4	68	33	+35	59	Qualification for the Conference League first qualifying round
3	Valur	27	12	8	7	66	42	+24	44	Qualification for the Conference League first qualifying round
4	Stjarnan	27	12	6	9	51	43	+8	42	
5	ÍA	27	11	4	12	49	47	+2	37	
6	FH	27	9	7	11	43	50	−7	34	

Source: KSI (in Icelandic), Soccerway
Rules for classification: 1) Points; 2) Goal difference; 3) Goals scored; 4) Head-to-head points; 5) Head-to-head goal difference; 6) Head-to-head goals scored; 7) Head-to-head away goals scored; 8) Play-off (only for deciding champion); 9) Draw.
(C) Champions

=== Results ===
Each team plays each other once (5 matches), either at home or away.

Home \ Away	BRE	FH	ÍA	STJ	VAL	VÍK
Breiðablik	—	—	2–0	2–1	2–2	—
FH	0–1	—	—	—	1–1	—
ÍA	—	4–1	—	—	—	3–4
Stjarnan	—	3–2	3–0	—	—	—
Valur	—	—	6–1	2–2	—	2–3
Víkingur Reykjavík	0–3	3–0	—	2–2	—	—

Source: KSI (in Icelandic), Soccerway
Legend: Blue = home team win; Yellow = draw; Red = away team win.

== Relegation Round ==
=== League table ===
Pos	Team	Pld	W	D	L	GF	GA	GD	Pts	Qualification or relegation
1	KA	27	10	7	10	44	48	−4	37	Qualification for the Conference League second qualifying round (Note: KA qualified for the Conference League second qualifying round by winning the 2024 Icelandic Cup.)
2	KR	27	9	7	11	56	49	+7	34	
3	Fram	27	8	6	13	38	49	−11	30	
4	Vestri	27	6	7	14	32	53	−21	25	
5	HK (R)	27	7	4	16	34	71	−37	25	Relegation to the 1. deild karla
6	Fylkir (R)	27	5	6	16	32	60	−28	21	Relegation to the 1. deild karla

Source: KSI (in Icelandic), Soccerway
Rules for classification: 1) Points; 2) Goal difference; 3) Goals scored; 4) Head-to-head points; 5) Head-to-head goal difference; 6) Head-to-head goals scored; 7) Head-to-head away goals scored; 8) Play-off (only for deciding champion); 9) Draw.
(R) Relegated

=== Results ===
Each team plays each other once (5 matches), either at home or away.

Home \ Away	FRA	FYL	HK	KA	KR	VES
Fram	—	2–0	—	1–4	—	2–4
Fylkir	—	—	—	1–3	0–1	—
HK	2–1	2–2	—	—	—	—
KA	—	—	3–3	—	0–4	2–1
KR	7–1	—	7–0	—	—	2–2
Vestri	—	1–3	2–1	—	—	—

Source: KSI (in Icelandic), Soccerway
Legend: Blue = home team win; Yellow = draw; Red = away team win.

== Season statistics ==
=== Top scorers ===
Final standing

Rank	Player	Club	Goals
1	(Football Association of Iceland) Viktor Jónsson	ÍA	18
1	(Football Association of Iceland) Ari Sigurpálsson	Víkingur	18
3	(Football Association of Iceland) Jónatan Ingi Jónsson	Valur	15
4	(Danish Football Association) Patrick Pedersen	Valur	14
5	(Football Association of Iceland) Gylfi Sigurðsson	Valur	13
6	(Football Association of Iceland) Benóný Breki Andrésson	KR	12
6	(Football Association of Iceland) Helgi Gudjónsson	Víkingur	12
6	(Football Association of Iceland) Höskuldur Gunnlaugsson	Breiðablik	12
6	(Football Association of Iceland) Danijel Djuric	Víkingur	12
6	(Football Association of Iceland) Viktor Karl Einarsson	Breiðablik	12
6	(Football Association of Iceland) Kjartan Kári Halldórsson	FH	12

=== Hat-tricks ===
Player	For	Against	Result	Date	Ref
(Football Association of Iceland) Viktor Jónsson	ÍA	HK	0–4 (A)	14 April 2024	

=== Clean sheets ===
Final standing

Rank	Player	Club	Clean sheets
1	(Football Association of Iceland) Anton Ari Einarsson	Breiðablik	9
2	(Football Association of Iceland) Ingvar Jónsson	Víkingur	8
2	(Football Association of Iceland) Árni Snær Ólafsson	Stjarnan	8
4	(Football Association of Iceland) Árni Marinó Einarsson	ÍA	6
5	(Football Association of Iceland) Ólafur Ólafsson	Fram	5
5	(Royal Dutch Football Association) Guy Smit	KR	5
5	(Swedish Football Association) William Eskelinen	Vestri	5
5	(Football Association of Iceland) Ólafur Kristófer Helgason	Fylkir	5
9	(Football Association of Iceland) Steinthór Már Audunsson	KA	4
10	(Football Association of Iceland) Frederik Schram	Valur	3
10	(Football Association of Iceland) Sindri Kristinn Ólafsson	FH	3

== Attendances ==
#	Football club	Average attendance
1	Breiðablik	1,224
2	KR	1,125
3	Víkingur	1,097
4	Valur	977
5	Fram	866
6	Fylkir	859
7	FH	845
8	Stjarnan	803
9	HK	695
10	ÍA	618
11	KA	568
12	Vestri	373
