= 2025 1. deild karla =

Icelandic football league season

1. deild karla
- Season: 2025
- Dates: 2 May 2025 – 13 September 2025
- Champions: Þór
- Promoted: Keflavík; Þór
- Relegated: Fjölnir; Selfoss
- Matches: 132
- Goals: 443 (3.36 per match)

The 2025 1. deild karla (English: Men's First Division) was the 71st season of second-tier Icelandic football. The season began on 2 May 2025 and finished on 13 September 2025.

== Teams ==
The league consisted of twelve teams; eight teams remaining from the previous season, two teams promoted from the 2. deild karla, and two teams relegated from the Besta deild karla.

The promoted teams were the 2024 2. deild karla champions Selfoss and runners-up Völsungur. They replaced the 2024 1. deild karla bottom two teams Dalvík/Reynir and Grótta.

The relegated teams were the 2024 Besta deild karla bottom two teams Fylkir and HK. They replaced the 2024 1. deild karla champions ÍBV and play-off winners Afturelding.

=== Stadia and locations ===
Locations of the 2025 1. deild karla teams

Team	Location
Fjölnir	Reykjavík
Fylkir	Reykjavík
Grindavík	Grindavík
HK	Kópavogur
ÍR	Reykjavík
Keflavík	Keflavík
Leiknir Reykjavík	Reykjavík
Njarðvík	Njarðvík
Selfoss	Selfoss
Völsungur	Húsavík
Þór	Akureyri
Þróttur Reykjavík	Reykjavík

== League table ==
Pos	Team	Pld	W	D	L	GF	GA	GD	Pts	Promotion, qualification or relegation
1	Þór (C, P)	22	14	3	5	51	31	+20	45	Promotion to the Besta deild karla
2	Njarðvík	22	12	7	3	50	25	+25	43	Qualification for the 1. deild karla play-offs
3	Þróttur Reykjavík	22	12	5	5	43	37	+6	41	Qualification for the 1. deild karla play-offs
4	HK	22	12	4	6	46	29	+17	40	Qualification for the 1. deild karla play-offs
5	Keflavík (O, P)	22	11	4	7	53	39	+14	37	Qualification for the 1. deild karla play-offs
6	ÍR	22	10	7	5	38	27	+11	37	
7	Völsungur	22	7	4	11	36	52	−16	25	
8	Fylkir	22	6	5	11	34	32	+2	23	
9	Leiknir Reykjavík	22	6	5	11	24	40	−16	23	
10	Grindavík	22	6	3	13	38	61	−23	21	
11	Selfoss (R)	22	6	1	15	25	44	−19	19	Relegation to the 2. deild karla
12	Fjölnir (R)	22	3	6	13	32	53	−21	15	Relegation to the 2. deild karla

Source: ksí.is(in Icelandic), Soccerway
Rules for classification: 1) Points; 2) Goal difference; 3) Goals scored; 4) Head-to-head points; 5) Head-to-head goal difference; 6) Head-to-head goals scored; 7) Head-to-head away goals scored; 8) Play-off (only for deciding champion); 9) Draw.
(C) Champions; (O) Play-off winners; (P) Promoted; (R) Relegated

== Results ==
Each team plays each other twice (22 matches each), once at home and once away.

Home \ Away	FJÖ	FYL	GRI	HK	ÍR	KEF	LER	NJA	SEL	VÖL	ÞÓR	ÞRÓ
Fjölnir	—	1–1	2–3	1–5	0–3	1–3	1–2	1–2	0–2	1–1	0–5	1–2
Fylkir	3–3	—	1–1	1–2	1–2	4–0	1–2	0–1	2–0	1–2	1–2	1–2
Grindavík	3–3	0–4	—	2–1	3–1	1–4	3–2	1–5	0–2	2–4	3–4	1–2
HK	3–0	0–2	3–3	—	1–1	3–0	1–0	1–3	4–1	3–1	1–2	5–2
ÍR	3–3	1–2	6–1	1–2	—	4–2	1–0	2–2	2–0	1–0	0–1	2–1
Keflavík	5–4	1–1	4–0	0–3	0–0	—	6–0	2–1	3–2	7–2	2–2	0–1
Leiknir Reykjavík	0–1	1–0	2–6	0–1	1–1	0–2	—	1–1	2–0	3–1	1–4	1–1
Njarðvík	1–1	1–1	3–0	3–0	1–1	3–1	3–1	—	2–1	5–1	3–1	2–3
Selfoss	1–2	3–1	2–1	3–0	0–1	1–4	2–2	0–4	—	1–2	3–2	0–2
Völsungur	2–1	1–4	2–0	0–4	2–3	1–1	1–2	1–1	4–0	—	2–5	2–2
Þór	2–1	4–1	2–0	1–1	1–1	2–4	2–0	3–1	2–0	1–3	—	1–2
Þróttur Reykjavík	1–4	2–1	2–4	2–2	3–1	3–2	1–1	2–2	2–1	4–1	1–2	—

Source: ksí.is
Legend: Blue = home team win; Yellow = draw; Red = away team win.

== 1. deild karla play-offs ==
Teams placed 2nd-5th qualified for the 1. deild karla play-offs, with the winners earning promotion to the 2026 Besta deild karla.

=== Semi-finals ===
==== First leg ====
17 September 2025	Keflavík (5th)	1–2	Njarðvík (2nd)	Keflavík
17:45 BST				Stadium: Keflavíkurvöllur

17 September 2025	HK (4th)	4–3	Þróttur Reykjavík (3rd)	Kópavogur
20:15 BST				Stadium: Kórinn

==== Second leg ====
21 September 2025	Njarðvík (2nd)	0–3 (2–4 agg.)	Keflavík (5th)	Njarðvík
15:00 BST				Stadium: JBÓ Stadium

21 September 2025	Þróttur Reykjavík (3rd)	2–3 (5–7 agg.)	HK (4th)	Reykjavík
15:00 BST				Stadium: Eimskipsvöllurinn

=== Final ===
27 September 2025	Keflavík (5th)	4–0	HK (4th)	Reykjavík
17:15 BST				Stadium: Laugardalsvöllur
