= Yann Emmanuel Affi =

Ivorian professional footballer

Personal information
- Date of birth: 11 November 1995 (age 31)
- Place of birth: Tiébissou, Ivory Coast
- Height: 1.85 m (6 ft 1 in)
- Position: Centre-back

Team information
- Current team: Þór Akureyri
- Number: 5

Senior career*
Years	Team	Apps	(Gls)
2015–2017	SC Gagnoa	3	(0)
2017–2019	Torpedo-BelAZ Zhodino	43	(0)
2020	SC Gagnoa		
2021	Dynamo Brest	20	(0)
2022	Gomel	26	(1)
2023	AC Oulu	27	(1)
2024	BATE Borisov	19	(1)
2025–	Þór Akureyri	40	(1)
- * Club domestic league appearances and goals as of 16 November 2026

Yann Emmanuel Affi (born 11 November 1995) is an Ivorian professional footballer who plays as a centre-back for Þór Akureyri. Besides his native Ivory Coast, he has played in Belarus and Finland.

== Career statistics ==
As of 16 November 2026

Appearances and goals by club, season and competition
Club	Season	League			National cup (Note: Includes Belarusian Cup, Suomen Cup and Icelandic Cup)		League cup (Note: Includes Icelandic League Cup)		Continental		Total	
Club	Season	Division	Apps	Goals	Apps	Goals	Apps	Goals	Apps	Goals	Apps	Goals
SC Gagnoa	2015–16	Ivorian Ligue 1	1	0	0	0	—		—		1	0
SC Gagnoa	2016–17	Ivorian Ligue 1	2	0	0	0	—		—		2	0
SC Gagnoa	Total		3	0	0	0	0	0	0	0	3	0
Torpedo-BelAZ Zhodino	2017	Belarusian Premier League	10	0	1	0	—		—		11	0
Torpedo-BelAZ Zhodino	2018	Belarusian Premier League	10	0	0	0	—		—		10	0
Torpedo-BelAZ Zhodino	2019	Belarusian Premier League	23	0	0	0	—		—		23	0
Torpedo-BelAZ Zhodino	Total		43	0	1	0	0	0	0	0	44	0
SC Gagnoa	2020–21	Ivorian League 1										
Dynamo Brest	2021	Belarusian Premier League	20	0	2	0	—		2 (Note: Includes UEFA Europa Conference League)	0	24	0
Gomel	2022	Belarusian Premier League	26	1	3	0	—		2	0	31	1
AC Oulu	2023	Veikkausliiga	27	1	5	0	4 (Note: Includes Finnish League Cup)	0	—		36	1
BATE Borisov	2024	Belarusian Premier League	19	1	2	1	—		—		21	2
Þór Akureyri	2025	1. deild karla	18	0	2	0	0	0	–		20	0
Þór Akureyri	2026	Besta deild karla	22	1	1	0	1	0	–		24	1
Þór Akureyri	Total		40	1	3	0	1	0	0	0	44	1
Career total			178	4	16	1	5	0	4	0	203	5

== Honours ==
Gomel

- Belarusian Cup: 2021/2022
