= Farid Zato-Arouna =

Togolese footballer

Personal information
- Full name: Farid Abdel Zato-Arouna
- Date of birth: 23 April 1992 (age 34)
- Height: 1.87 m (6 ft 1 1/2 in)
- Position: Midfielder

Team information
- Current team: Kórdrengir

Senior career*
Years	Team	Apps	(Gls)
2011	FH	0	(0)
2011–2012	HK	24	(2)
2013	Víkingur Ólafsvík	22	(1)
2014	KR	15	(0)
2015	Kári	4	(2)
2015	Keflavík	8	(0)
2015–2016	Sigma Olomouc B	2	(0)
2016–2017	Víkingur Ólafsvík	7	(0)
2018–2019	Kórdrengir	19	(0)
2023	Knattspyrnufélag Kópavogs	2	(0)

International career^{‡}
2013–2016	Togo	3	(0)
- * Club domestic league appearances and goals as of 19:57, 17 January 2020 (UTC) ‡ National team caps and goals as of 08:40, 16 March 2018 (UTC)

Farid Abdel Zato-Arouna (born 23 April 1992) is a Togolese footballer and a former member of the Togo national football team.

== Career ==
Zato-Arouna has played for FH, HK, Víkingur Ólafsvík, KR, Kári, Keflavík and Sigma Olomouc B.

He made his international debut for Togo in 2013.
