= Dominik Radić =

Croatian footballer

Personal information
- Full name: Dominik Radić
- Date of birth: 26 July 1996 (age 30)
- Place of birth: Hanover, Germany
- Height: 1.88 m (6 ft 2 in)
- Position: Forward

Team information
- Current team: HK
- Number: 17

Youth career
- 2006–2011: Dinamo Zagreb
- 2011: Lokomotiva
- 2011–2012: Croatia Sesvete
- 2012–2013: HAŠK
- 2013–2014: Inter Zaprešić

Senior career*
Years	Team	Apps	(Gls)
2015–2016	Inter Zaprešić	19	(0)
2016–2017	Slaven Belupo	5	(0)
2017–2020	Rudar Velenje	93	(20)
2020–2021	Sigma Olomouc	3	(0)
2021–2022	Sereď	27	(5)
2022–2023	Široki Brijeg	20	(2)
2023–2024	Gloria Buzău	12	(1)
2024–2025	Njarðvík	44	(23)
2026–	HK	24	(18)
- * Club domestic league appearances and goals as of 14 October 2026

Dominik Radić (born 26 July 1996) is a Croatian professional footballer who plays as a forward for Icelandic club HK.

== Club career ==
=== ŠKF Sereď ===
Radić made his Fortuna Liga debut for Sereď against Žilina on 25 July 2021.

=== Njarðvík ===
In March 2024, Radić joined Icelandic 1. deild karla club Njarðvík on a one-year contract.

== Honours ==
Inter Zaprešić

- Druga HNL: 2014–15
