= Gregg Ryder =

English football coach

Personal information
- Date of birth: 1987 or 1988 (age 38–39)
- Height: 6 ft 0 in (1.83 m)
- Position: Forward

Youth career
- Hexham Tigers
- Stocksfield

College career
Years	Team	Apps	(Gls)
2008–2010	Viterbo University	45	(4)

Senior career*
Years	Team	Apps	(Gls)
2011–????	KFS Vestmannaeyja		

Managerial career
- 2013–2018: Knattspyrnufélagið Þróttur
- 2018–2019: Þór Akureyri
- 2023–2024: KR
- * Club domestic league appearances and goals

Gregg Ryder (born 1987 or 1988) is an English football coach and former player who most recently was the manager of Icelandic club KR.

== Career ==
Ryder attended Queen Elizabeth High School, Hexham and played for local clubs Hexham Tigers and Stocksfield. He moved to the United States aged 18 on a soccer scholarship, attending Viterbo University, playing as a forward and captaining the team for two years. After returning to England, also coaching at Newcastle United, he moved to Iceland to coach.

Ryder began working as an assistant coach at ÍBV in 2011, also playing for KFS Vestmannaeyja. He obtained his UEFA B coaching qualification in 2012.

Ryder managed Knattspyrnufélagið Þróttur from 2013, when he became the youngest-ever manager to take charge of a team in Iceland's top two divisions. He won promotion in the 2015 season.

After leaving the club, he was linked with a return to the UK, at Scottish club Greenock Morton and English non-league clubs Gateshead and York City.

He became manager of Þór Akureyri in October 2018. He left the club at the end of the 2019 season. He was then linked with the Falkirk job in Scotland.

He coached at Danish club HB Køge from 2020, before returning to Iceland to become manager of KR in October 2023. In February 2024 he was praised by Theódór Elmar Bjarnason. He left KR in June 2024.

== Personal life ==
Ryder is a Newcastle United fan.
