= Kórdrengir =

Icelandic football club

- Full name: Knattspyrnufélagið Kórdrengir
- Founded: 2017; 8 years ago
- Dissolved: 2023
- Ground: Framvöllur, Reykjavík
- Capacity: 1200
- 2022: 5th of 12

Knattspyrnufélagið Kórdrengir (Icelandic pronunciation: [ˈkʰnahtˌspɪ(r)tnʏˌfjɛːˌlaijɪð ˈkʰouːr̥ˌtreiɲcɪr̥], lit. 'Choirboys Football Club' (Note: Knattspyrnufélagið is the definite form of Knattspyrnufélag, meaning "the football club".)) was an Icelandic football club based in Reykjavík, Iceland. After gaining three promotions from 2018 to 2020, the team folded after the 2022 season.

== History ==
The club was founded in 2017. It first participated in the Icelandic tier-5 league, 4. deild karla, in 2017. In 2018 they achieved promotion to 3. deild karla, in 2019 to 2. deild karla and in 2020 to 1. deild karla.

== Stats history ==
Season	League	Pos.	Pl.	W	D	L	GS	GA	P	Cup	Notes
2017	4. deild	1	14	11	1	2	41	19	34	1/64 finals	3rd place in promotion play-offs
2018	4. deild	1	12	8	1	3	26	12	25	1/32 finals	Promoted to 3. deild
2019	3. deild	1	22	17	3	2	63	27	54	1/16 finals	Promoted to 2. deild
2020	2. deild	1	20	14	4	2	45	13	46	1/16 finals	Promoted to 1. deild
2021	1. deild	4	22	11	6	5	39	28	39	1/32 finals	
2022	1. deild	5	22	9	6	7	36	30	33	1/8 finals	Folded after the season

=== Overall ===
- Seasons spent at Level 1 of the Icelandic football league system: 0
- Seasons spent at Level 2 of the football league system: 2
- Seasons spent at Level 3 of the football league system: 1
- Seasons spent at Level 4 of the football league system: 1
- Seasons spent at Level 5 of the football league system: 2

== Top scorers by season ==
Season	Player	Total Goals	Domestic League	Domestic Cup
**2019**	(Iceland) **Magnús Þórir Matthíasson**	20	19	1
**2018**	(Iceland) Hjörtur Júlíus Hjartarson	8	8	0
**2018**	(France) Lassana Drame	8	8	0
**2017**	(Iceland) **Ásgeir Frank Ásgeirsson**	7	7	0

Players in bold are currently playing for Kórdrengir.

== Former notable players ==
Players who have played for Kórdrengir and earned international caps at senior level. Correct as of 7 February 2020.

Nat.	Player	Date of birth	Current club	Position	International career
(Gabon)	Loïc Mbang Ondo	5 October 1992 (age 32)	(Iceland) Kórdrengir	Defender	2017–
(Togo)	Farid Zato-Arouna	23 April 1992 (age 33)	Free agent	Midfielder	2013–
(Trinidad and Tobago)	Yohance Marshall	22 January 1986 (age 39)	Retired	Defender	2010–
(Iceland)	Tryggvi Guðmundsson	30 July 1974 (age 50)	Retired	Forward	1997–2008

== Managerial history ==
Dates	Name	Notes
2017–2022	(Iceland) Davíð Smári Lamude	

== Honours ==
- **4. deild karla**
  - Third place (1): 2018
- **3. deild karla**
  - Winners (1): 2019
