= Freysteinn Ingi Gudnason =

Icelandic footballer (born 2007)

Freysteinn Ingi Guðnason
Personal information
- Date of birth: 4 July 2007 (age 19)
- Height: 1.77 m (5 ft 10 in)
- Position: Forward

Team information
- Current team: Njarðvík

Youth career
- Njarðvík

Senior career*
Years	Team	Apps	(Gls)
2022–	Njarðvík	8	(5)

International career^{‡}
2022	Iceland U15	2	(0)
2023–	Iceland U16	3	(9)
- * Club domestic league appearances and goals as of 23:04, 30 July 2023 (UTC) ‡ National team caps and goals as of 23:04, 30 July 2023 (UTC)

Freysteinn Ingi Guðnason (born 4 July 2007) is an Icelandic footballer currently playing as a forward for Njarðvík.

== Club career ==
In October 2021, Guðnason went on trial with Danish side Odense Boldklub, playing in one game for the under-15 side, scoring twice and notching an assist in a 3–1 win. Despite this, he remained with his club, Njarðvík, and made his debut the following year, becoming the club's youngest player at fourteen years, eleven months and eleven days old, when he came on as a second-half substitute in Njarðvík's 6–0 win over Ægir in the 2. deild karla on 22 June 2022. In October of the same year, he signed his first contract with the club, a three-year deal, following three further league appearances.

The following season, he scored his first goal for the club; in Njarðvík's 1. deild karla fixture against Grindavík on 29 July 2023, Guðnason was brought on as a substitute for Belgian teammate Oumar Diouck with two minutes remaining, and four minutes later he scored past Grindavík goalkeeper Aron Dagur Birnuson from six yards.

== International career ==
Guðnason has represented Iceland at under-15 and under-16 level.

== Career statistics ==
=== Club ===
As of 30 July 2023.

Appearances and goals by club, season and competition
Club	Season	League			National Cup (Note: Includes Icelandic Cup)		League Cup (Note: Includes Lengjubikarinn)		Other		Total	
Club	Season	Division	Apps	Goals	Apps	Goals	Apps	Goals	Apps	Goals	Apps	Goals
Njarðvík	2022	2. deild karla	4	0	0	0	–		0	0	4	0
Njarðvík	2023	1. deild karla	4	1	1	0	4	0	0	0	9	1
Career total			8	1	1	0	4	0	0	0	13	1
