= Rafael Victor =

Portuguese footballer

Personal information
- Full name: Rafael Alexandre Romão Victor
- Date of birth: 21 October 1996 (age 30)
- Place of birth: Rio de Mouro - Sintra, Portugal
- Height: 1.88 m (6 ft 2 in)
- Position: Striker

Team information
- Current team: Njarðvík (on loan from Grindavík)
- Number: 15

Youth career
- 2010–2011: Futsal
- 2011–2013: Mem Martins
- 2013–2014: Sintrense
- 2014–2016: Boavista

Senior career*
Years	Team	Apps	(Gls)
2015	→ Vila Real (loan)	3	(0)
2016–2017	Damaiense		
2017	Louletano	8	(0)
2018	Eléctrico	16	(5)
2018–2019	Oleiros	27	(12)
2019–2020	Þróttur Reykjavík	21	(12)
2020	Kafr Qasim	12	(2)
2020–2022	Sandecja Nowy Sącz	15	(4)
2022	Höttur/Huginn	19	(11)
2022	Sertanense	17	(1)
2023	Njarðvík	20	(13)
2024–2025	Þór Akureyri	33	(13)
2026-	Grindavík	15	(3)
2026-	→ Njarðvík (loan)	4	(0)
- * Club domestic league appearances and goals as of 14 October 2026

Rafael Alexandre Romão Victor (born 21 October 1996) is a Portuguese professional footballer who plays as a forward for Icelandic club Njarðvík, on loan from Grindavík.

== Club career ==
He made his league debut for Sandecja Nowy Sącz in a 2–0 away loss against GKS Tychy on 12 September 2020.
