= 2026 Besta deild karla =

Besta deild karla
- Season: 2026
- Dates: 10 April – 24 October 2026
- Champions: Víkingur Reykjavík (9th title)
- Relegated: KA; ÍBV
- Champions League: Víkingur Reykjavík
- Europa League: Breiðablik
- Conference League: Fram; KR

The 2026 Besta deild karla is the 115th season of top-flight Icelandic Football. It is the fifth season following the league's rebrand as Besta deild karla.

== Teams ==
The league consisted of twelve teams; the top ten teams from the previous season, and two teams promoted from the 1. deild karla. Víkingur Reykjavík entered the season as defending champions after winning their eighth title during the previous season.

The promoted teams were the 2025 1. deild karla champions Þór Akureyri and play-off winners Keflavík (promoted to the top division after absences of eleven and two years respectively). They replaced the 2025 Besta deild karla bottom two teams, Vestri and Afturelding.

=== Changes from the previous season ===
Promoted to the Besta deild

- Þór Akureyri
- Keflavík

Relegated to the 1. deild

- Vestri
- Afturelding

=== Personnel and kits ===
| Team | Manager | Captain | Kit manufacturer | Shirt sponsor (chest) |
|---|---|---|---|---|
| Breiðablik | (Iceland) Ólafur Ingi Skúlason | (Iceland) Höskuldur Gunnlaugsson | (United States) Nike | Vörður |
| FH | (Iceland) Jóhannes Karl Guðjónsson | (Iceland) Ísak Snær Ólafsson | (United States) Nike | Auður |
| Fram | (Iceland) Rúnar Kristinsson | (Denmark) Kennie Chopart | (Italy) Erreà | Michelsen 1909 |
| KA | (Iceland) Hallgrímur Jónasson | (Iceland) Ívar Örn Árnason | (Italy) Macron | N1 |
| Keflavík | (Iceland) Haraldur Guðmundsson | (Iceland) Frans Elvarsson | (Germany) Adidas | Blue Car Rental |
| KR | (Iceland) Óskar Hrafn Þorvaldsson | (Iceland) Aron Sigurðarson | (Italy) Macron | Alvotech |
| Stjarnan | (Iceland) Jón Þór Hauksson | (Iceland) Guðmundur Kristjánsson | (Germany) Puma | TM |
| Valur | (Iceland) Hermann Hreiðarsson | (Iceland) Hólmar Örn Eyjólfsson | (Italy) Macron | Saltverk |
| Víkingur Reykjavík | (Iceland) Sölvi Ottesen | (Sweden) Oliver Ekroth | (Italy) Macron | Húsasmiðjan |
| ÍA | (Iceland) Lárus Orri Sigurðsson | (Iceland) Rúnar Már Sigurjónsson | (Germany) Puma | Norðurál |
| ÍBV | (Serbia) Aleksandar Linta | (Iceland) Alex Freyr Hilmarsson | (United States) Nike | N1 |
| Þór Akureyri | (Iceland) Sigurður Heiðar Höskuldsson | (Iceland) Aron Birkir Stefánsson | (Italy) Macron | Egils Appelsín |

== Stadia and locations ==
Locations of the 2026 Besta deild karla teams

| Team | Location | Stadium |
|---|---|---|
| Breiðablik | Kópavogur | Kópavogsvöllur |
| FH | Hafnarfjörður | Kaplakriki |
| Fram | Reykjavík | Lambhagavöllur |
| KA | Akureyri | Greifavöllurinn |
| Keflavík | Keflavík | Keflavíkurvöllur |
| KR | Reykjavík | Meistaravellir |
| Stjarnan | Garðabær | Samsung völlurinn |
| Valur | Reykjavík | N1 Völlurinn |
| Víkingur Reykjavík | Reykjavík | Víkingsvöllur |
| ÍA | Akranes | ELKEM völlurinn |
| ÍBV | Vestmannaeyjar | Hásteinsvöllur |
| Þór Akureyri | Akureyri | Þórsvöllur |

== Regular season ==
=== League table ===
| Pos | Team | Pld | W | D | L | GF | GA | GD | Pts | Qualification |
|---|---|---|---|---|---|---|---|---|---|---|
| 1 | Víkingur Reykjavík | 22 | 16 | 5 | 1 | 67 | 21 | +46 | 53 | Qualification for the Championship Round |
| 2 | Fram | 22 | 13 | 6 | 3 | 56 | 42 | +14 | 45 | Qualification for the Championship Round |
| 3 | KR | 22 | 13 | 5 | 4 | 74 | 49 | +25 | 44 | Qualification for the Championship Round |
| 4 | Breiðablik | 22 | 8 | 6 | 8 | 43 | 41 | +2 | 30 | Qualification for the Championship Round |
| 5 | ÍA | 22 | 8 | 6 | 8 | 39 | 41 | −2 | 30 | Qualification for the Championship Round |
| 6 | Keflavík | 22 | 8 | 4 | 10 | 33 | 38 | −5 | 28 | Qualification for the Championship Round |
| 7 | Stjarnan | 22 | 8 | 4 | 10 | 42 | 50 | −8 | 28 | Qualification for the Relegation Round |
| 8 | Valur | 22 | 8 | 3 | 11 | 39 | 45 | −6 | 27 | Qualification for the Relegation Round |
| 9 | FH | 22 | 4 | 9 | 9 | 27 | 39 | −12 | 21 | Qualification for the Relegation Round |
| 10 | Þór Akureyri | 22 | 6 | 3 | 13 | 22 | 50 | −28 | 21 | Qualification for the Relegation Round |
| 11 | KA | 22 | 5 | 5 | 12 | 35 | 48 | −13 | 20 | Qualification for the Relegation Round |
| 12 | ÍBV | 22 | 4 | 6 | 12 | 32 | 45 | −13 | 18 | Qualification for the Relegation Round |

Source: KSI (in Icelandic), Soccerway
Rules for classification: 1) Points; 2) Goal difference; 3) Goals scored; 4) Head-to-head points; 5) Head-to-head goal difference; 6) Head-to-head goals scored; 7) Head-to-head away goals scored; 8) Play-off (only for deciding champion); 9) Draw.

=== Results ===
Team play each other twice (once at home and once away) for a total of 22 games each.

| Home \ Away | BRE | FH | FRA | KA | KEF | KR | STJ | VAL | VÍK | ÍA | ÍBV | ÞÓR |
|---|---|---|---|---|---|---|---|---|---|---|---|---|
| Breiðablik | — | 3–3 | 3–4 | 3–1 | 2–1 | 6–3 | 0–2 | 1–3 | 1–4 | 1–0 | 1–0 | 4–0 |
| FH | 0–0 | — | 3–4 | 1–2 | 2–1 | 1–1 | 2–2 | 2–0 | 2–4 | 0–1 | 1–1 | 1–1 |
| Fram | 4–3 | 0–0 | — | 2–2 | 3–1 | 2–5 | 3–1 | 3–2 | 0–5 | 3–3 | 5–1 | 6–1 |
| KA | 2–1 | 0–1 | 3–4 | — | 1–2 | 3–5 | 2–3 | 0–1 | 0–2 | 3–2 | 2–0 | 0–0 |
| Keflavík | 0–0 | 1–2 | 1–1 | 3–0 | — | 3–2 | 1–1 | 1–2 | 1–3 | 5–2 | 1–0 | 1–0 |
| KR | 3–3 | 4–2 | 2–2 | 5–3 | 3–2 | — | 5–0 | 3–1 | 1–1 | 5–3 | 5–2 | 5–2 |
| Stjarnan | 4–4 | 3–2 | 0–1 | 3–1 | 1–0 | 2–3 | — | 2–4 | 1–3 | 1–2 | 2–2 | 4–2 |
| Valur | 3–2 | 3–0 | 2–3 | 4–4 | 1–1 | 1–4 | 2–3 | — | 1–5 | 2–2 | 2–1 | 1–2 |
| Víkingur Reykjavík | 1–1 | 5–0 | 2–2 | 3–2 | 5–1 | 2–0 | 3–2 | 2–0 | — | 4–0 | 2–2 | 6–0 |
| ÍA | 1–2 | 1–1 | 0–2 | 1–1 | 1–3 | 3–1 | 5–1 | 1–0 | 2–2 | — | 2–2 | 2–0 |
| ÍBV | 1–2 | 1–1 | 1–2 | 2–2 | 6–1 | 2–6 | 2–1 | 1–0 | 0–2 | 1–3 | — | 0–1 |
| Þór Akureyri | 1–0 | 1–0 | 1–0 | 0–1 | 0–2 | 3–3 | 1–3 | 2–4 | 2–1 | 1–2 | 1–4 | — |

Source: KSI (in Icelandic), Soccerway
Legend: Blue = home team win; Yellow = draw; Red = away team win.

== Championship round ==
=== League table ===
| Pos | Team | Pld | W | D | L | GF | GA | GD | Pts | Qualification |
|---|---|---|---|---|---|---|---|---|---|---|
| 1 | Víkingur Reykjavík (C) | 27 | 19 | 7 | 1 | 79 | 28 | +51 | 64 | Qualification for the Champions League first qualifying round |
| 2 | KR | 27 | 17 | 5 | 5 | 93 | 58 | +35 | 56 | Qualification for the Conference League second qualifying round |
| 3 | Fram | 27 | 13 | 8 | 6 | 64 | 55 | +9 | 47 | Qualification for the Conference League first qualifying round |
| 4 | ÍA | 27 | 10 | 8 | 9 | 54 | 55 | −1 | 38 | |
| 5 | Breiðablik | 27 | 10 | 6 | 11 | 54 | 57 | −3 | 36 | Qualification for the Europa League first qualifying round (Note: Breiðablik qualified for the Europa League first qualifying round as the 2026 Icelandic Cup winners.) |
| 6 | Keflavík | 27 | 8 | 6 | 13 | 43 | 54 | −11 | 30 | |

Source: KSI (in Icelandic), Soccerway
Rules for classification: 1) Points; 2) Goal difference; 3) Goals scored; 4) Head-to-head points; 5) Head-to-head goal difference; 6) Head-to-head goals scored; 7) Head-to-head away goals scored; 8) Play-off (only for deciding champion); 9) Draw.
(C) Champions

=== Results ===
Teams play each other once for the third time (either at home or away) for a total of 5 games each.

| Home \ Away | BRE | FRA | KEF | KR | VÍK | ÍA |
|---|---|---|---|---|---|---|
| Breiðablik | — | — | 3–1 | — | 1–2 | — |
| Fram | 1–3 | — | — | 1–2 | — | 2–4 |
| Keflavík | — | 2–2 | — | 2–3 | — | — |
| KR | 8–3 | — | — | — | 1–2 | 5–1 |
| Víkingur Reykjavík | — | 2–2 | 4–1 | — | — | 2–2 |
| ÍA | 4–1 | — | 4–4 | — | — | — |

Source: KSI (in Icelandic), Soccerway
Legend: Blue = home team win; Yellow = draw; Red = away team win.

== Relegation round ==
=== League table ===
| Pos | Team | Pld | W | D | L | GF | GA | GD | Pts | Relegation |
|---|---|---|---|---|---|---|---|---|---|---|
| 1 | Stjarnan | 27 | 10 | 4 | 13 | 53 | 61 | −8 | 34 | |
| 2 | Valur | 27 | 10 | 4 | 13 | 51 | 59 | −8 | 34 | |
| 3 | FH | 27 | 7 | 9 | 11 | 42 | 49 | −7 | 30 | |
| 4 | Þór Akureyri | 27 | 9 | 3 | 15 | 29 | 59 | −30 | 30 | |
| 5 | KA (R) | 27 | 8 | 5 | 14 | 47 | 56 | −9 | 29 | Relegation to the 1. deild karla |
| 6 | ÍBV (R) | 27 | 5 | 7 | 15 | 37 | 55 | −18 | 22 | Relegation to the 1. deild karla |

Source: KSI (in Icelandic), Soccerway
Rules for classification: 1) Points; 2) Goal difference; 3) Goals scored; 4) Head-to-head points; 5) Head-to-head goal difference; 6) Head-to-head goals scored; 7) Head-to-head away goals scored; 8) Play-off (only for deciding champion); 9) Draw.
(R) Relegated

=== Results ===
Teams play each other once for the third time (either at home or away) for a total of 5 games each.

| Home \ Away | FH | KA | STJ | VAL | ÍBV | ÞÓR |
|---|---|---|---|---|---|---|
| FH | — | 3–0 | 5–2 | — | — | 1–2 |
| KA | — | — | — | — | 5–1 | 3–0 |
| Stjarnan | — | 0–3 | — | 6–0 | 2–0 | — |
| Valur | 3–5 | 4–1 | — | — | — | 4–1 |
| ÍBV | 3–1 | — | — | 1–1 | — | — |
| Þór Akureyri | — | — | 3–1 | — | 1–0 | — |

Source: KSI (in Icelandic), Soccerway
Legend: Blue = home team win; Yellow = draw; Red = away team win.
