= Tommy Møller Nielsen =

Danish footballer (1961–2023)

Personal information
- Date of birth: 5 August 1961
- Place of birth: Odense, Denmark
- Date of death: 9 July 2023 (aged 61)
- Place of death: Frankfurt, Germany
- Position: Forward

Youth career
- OB

Senior career*
Years	Team	Apps	(Gls)
1979–1984	B 1909		
1984–1985	OB		
1985–1986	KB		
1986–1988	B 1909		
1988–1991	OKS		

Managerial career
- 1992: MB Miðvágur
- 1994–1995: B1909
- 1996–1997: B1909
- 2003–2006: B1909
- 2006–2007: Viborg
- 2010–2011: HB Køge (youth)
- 2011–2012: HB Køge
- * Club domestic league appearances and goals

Tommy Møller Nielsen (5 August 1961 – 9 July 2023) was a Danish football coach and player. He was the son of Denmark national team coach Richard Møller Nielsen.

In July 2023, at the age of 61, he died at Frankfurt Airport in Germany.

== Sources ==
- Report on Rangers switch
- Dons' number two departs
- Tommy Møller Nielsen Interview
