= Felix Örn Friðriksson =

Icelandic footballer

Personal information
- Full name: Felix Örn Friðriksson
- Date of birth: 16 March 1999 (age 27)
- Place of birth: Vestmannaeyjar, Iceland
- Position: Left-back

Team information
- Current team: ÍBV
- Number: 26

Youth career
- ÍBV

Senior career*
Years	Team	Apps	(Gls)
2016–	ÍBV	213	(8)
2018	→ Vejle Boldklub (loan)	2	(0)

International career^{‡}
2015	Iceland U-16	5	(0)
2016	Iceland U-17	5	(0)
2017–	Iceland U-21	14	(1)
2018–	Iceland	2	(0)
- * Club domestic league appearances and goals as of 16 November 2026 ‡ National team caps and goals as of 10 February 2020

Felix Örn Friðriksson (born 16 March 1999) is an Icelandic football defender, who currently plays for ÍBV.

== Club career ==
Felix was loaned out to Vejle Boldklub on 24 July 2018, but the loan deal was terminated half a year before the supposed time on 17 December 2018.

== International career ==
Felix has been involved with the U-17 and U-21 teams, and made his senior team debut in an unofficial friendly against Indonesia Selection on 11 January 2018.

== Career statistics ==
=== Club ===
As of 13 August 2024

Appearances and goals by club, season and competition
Club	Season	League			National Cup		Continental		Other		Total	
Club	Season	Division	Apps	Goals	Apps	Goals	Apps	Goals	Apps	Goals	Apps	Goals
ÍBV	2015	Besta deild karla	—		1	0	—		—		1	0
ÍBV	2016	Besta deild karla	11	0	3	0	—		—		14	0
ÍBV	2017	Besta deild karla	21	0	4	0	—		—		25	0
ÍBV	2018	Besta deild karla	12	1	2	0	2 (Note: Appearance(s) in UEFA Europa League)	0	1 (Note: Appearance(s) in Icelandic Super Cup)	0	17	1
ÍBV	2019	Besta deild karla	20	0	3	0	—		—		23	0
ÍBV	2020	1. deild karla	20	1	3	0	—		—		23	1
ÍBV	2021	1. deild karla	21	1	1	0	—		—		22	1
ÍBV	2022	Besta deild karla	26	2	1	0	—		—		27	2
ÍBV	2023	Besta deild karla	26	3	1	0	—		—		27	3
ÍBV	2024	1. deild karla	13	0	1	0	—		—		14	0
ÍBV	Total		170	8	20	0	2	0	1	0	193	8
Vejle Boldklub	2018-19	Danish Superliga	1	0	1	0	—		—		2	0
Career Total			171	8	21	0	2	0	1	0	195	8
