= HB Køge =

Danish football club

- Full name: Herfølge Boldklub Køge
- Nicknames: HBK, Svanerne (The Swans), Herfølge-Køge
- Founded: 1 July 2009; 17 years ago
- Ground: Køge Idrætspark
- Capacity: 8,000 (3,440 seated)
- Owner: Capelli Sport
- Chairman: Søren Storgaard
- Manager: Nicklas Pedersen
- League: Danish 1st Division
- 2025–26: Danish 1st Division, 10th of 12
- Website: www.hbkoge.dk
| Home colours | Away colours | Third colours |

HB Køge (Danish pronunciation: [ˈkʰøː(j)ə]) is a Danish professional football club based primarily in the town of Køge and secondly in the town of Herfølge, both in the Køge Municipality, part of 'Region of Zealand', in the eastern part of Zealand, south of Copenhagen. It was created through the merger of Herfølge and Køge Boldklub in 2009.

== History ==
The Danish 1st Division club Herfølge and bankrupt club Køge Boldklub decided in March 2009 to merge. The club played their first season as a merged club in the 2009–10 season of the Danish Superliga. The season ended in relegation.

In the following 1st Division season, they finished second and returned to the Superliga. Following the promotion manager Aurelijus Skarbalius left the club for a job as assistant manager of Brøndby and was replaced by Tommy Møller Nielsen. The club's second appearance in the Danish Superliga ended in another relegation.

The 2012–13 season started with a series of bad results, and this led to the sacking of Møller Nielsen in September 2012 after a 5–0 defeat against Lyngby. He was replaced by his assistant Per Frandsen, who led the club to two consecutive sixth-place finishes before leaving for a youth job at Brøndby in June 2014.

== Players ==
=== Current squad ===
As of 3 September 2026

Note: Flags indicate national team as defined under FIFA eligibility rules; some limited exceptions apply. Players may hold more than one non-FIFA nationality.

| No. | Pos. | Nation | Player |
|---|---|---|---|
| 1 | GK | DEN | Noah Sømmergaard |
| 2 | DF | DEN | Laurits Bust |
| 4 | DF | DEN | Silas Hald |
| 5 | MF | NED | Gabriël Çulhacı |
| 6 | DF | DEN | Rasmus Brodersen |
| 7 | MF | DEN | Mike Jensen |
| 8 | MF | DEN | Marcel Rømer |
| 9 | FW | DEN | Tobias Thomsen |
| 10 | MF | DEN | Christian Tue Jensen |
| 11 | FW | DEN | Magnus Warming (on loan from Lyngby) |
| 14 | MF | DEN | Viktor Sørensen |
| 15 | DF | DEN | Efe Bayrak |
| 16 | GK | DEN | Casper Mols |

| No. | Pos. | Nation | Player |
|---|---|---|---|
| 17 | MF | DEN | Lukas Achton |
| 18 | FW | DEN | Mustafa Salah |
| 19 | FW | MKD | Erkan Semovski |
| 20 | MF | DEN | Ibrahim Figuigui |
| 21 | MF | DEN | Niklas Jakobsen |
| 22 | DF | DEN | Mattias Jakobsen |
| 23 | DF | DEN | Mads Westergren |
| 24 | MF | DEN | Mads Schütt |
| 25 | MF | MKD | Fisnik Isaki |
| 27 | FW | DEN | Noah Stolshøj |
| 28 | MF | DEN | Gabriel Larsen |
| 29 | DF | DEN | Sebastian Rosenwanger |
| 30 | DF | DEN | Emil Villumsen |

=== Youth players in use 2026-27 ===
Note: Flags indicate national team as defined under FIFA eligibility rules; some limited exceptions apply. Players may hold more than one non-FIFA nationality.

| No. | Pos. | Nation | Player |

=== Out on loan ===
Note: Flags indicate national team as defined under FIFA eligibility rules; some limited exceptions apply. Players may hold more than one non-FIFA nationality.

| No. | Pos. | Nation | Player |

== Club officials ==
| Name | Position |
|---|---|
| (Denmark) Nicklas Pedersen | Manager |
| (England) Gregg Ryder | Assistant Manager |
| (Lebanon) Jean Abdo | Match Analyst |
| (Denmark) Heidi E. Johansen | First Team Goalkeeping Coach |
| (Denmark) Per Rud | Director of Sports |

== Managers ==
- (Lithuania) Aurelijus Skarbalius (2009–2011)
- (Denmark) Tommy Møller Nielsen (2011–2012)
- (Denmark) Per Frandsen (2012–2014)
- (Denmark) Henrik Pedersen (2014–2015)
- (Denmark) Henrik Lehm (2016–2018)
- (Denmark) Morten Karlsen (2018–2019)
- (Lithuania) Aurelijus Skarbalius (2020–2021)
- (Denmark) Daniel Agger (2021–2023)
- (Denmark) Nicklas Pedersen (2023–present)

== Partnership ==
- (Lithuania) Utenis Utena
