= Davíð Smári Lamude =

Icelandic football manager

Personal information
- Date of birth: 1 April 1984 (age 42)
- Position: Goalkeeper

Senior career*
Years	Team	Apps	(Gls)
2008	Álftanes	11	(0)
2012	Fákur		
2013	Álftanes	2	(0)
2015	Gnúpverjar		
2017–2018	Kórdrengir	2	(0)

Managerial career
- 2017–2022: Kórdrengir
- 2023–2025: Vestri
- 2026: Njarðvík
- * Club domestic league appearances and goals

Davíð Smári Lamude (born 1 April 1984) is an Icelandic football manager. In 2025, he guided Vestri to victory in the Icelandic cup.

== Management career ==
Davíð started his management career in 2017 with Kórdrengir in the fifth-tier 4. deild karla. After finishing third in the promotion playoffs in 2017, he guided the team to promotion to the 3. deild karla in 2018. In 2019, he guided Kórdrengir to victory in 3. deild and the following year Kórdrengir won 2. deild karla and where promoted to the second-tier 1. deild karla.

After two season in the 1. deild with Kórdrengir, Davíð was hired as the manager of rival 1. deild club Vestri. On 30 September 2023, Vestri defeated Afturelding in the 1. deild karla promotion playoff final to secure a berth in the top-tier Besta deild karla for the first time in its history.

On 22 August 2025, he guided Vestri to its first major trophy when the team defeated Valur in the Icelandic Cup final, 1–0. On 29 September 2025, he stepped down as manager after string of bad results that left the team fighting relegation.

On 5 November 2025, he was hired as the new manager of 1. deild karla club Njarðvík.

== Honours ==
=== Manager ===
- Icelandic Cup: 2025
- 1. deild karla play-offs: 2023
- 2. deild karla: 2020
- 3. deild karla: 2019
