= Abel Dhaira =

Ugandan footballer (1987-2016)

Personal information
- Date of birth: 9 September 1987
- Place of birth: Jinja, Uganda
- Date of death: 27 March 2016 (aged 28)
- Place of death: Reykjavík, Iceland
- Position: Goalkeeper

Senior career*
Years	Team	Apps	(Gls)
2006–2008	Express		
2008–2009	URA		
2010	AS Vita		
2011–2012	ÍBV	31	(0)
2013	Simba	0	(0)
2014–2016	ÍBV	27	(0)

International career
2009–2016	Uganda	13	(0)
- * Club domestic league appearances and goals

Abel Dhaira (9 September 1987 – 27 March 2016) was an Ugandan professional footballer who played as a goalkeeper. He capped 13 times for the Uganda national team.

== Club career ==
Dhaira played club football in Uganda, the Congo and Iceland for Express, URA, AS Vita (whom he joined in December 2009 for US$22,000) and ÍBV. He was released by Tanzanian club Simba SC in December 2013.

== International career ==
Dhaira made his international debut for Uganda in 2009. He won three CECAFA Cups in 2009, 2011 and 2012. At the 2012 CECAFA Cup he was hospitalised following a collision with an opposition player.

== Death ==
In 2015, Dhaira was diagnosed with abdominal cancer and underwent surgery in Uganda in December the same year. He returned to Iceland in January 2016 where he underwent further medical treatment. However, the cancer had spread throughout his body and on 27 March 2016, he died from the illness at The National University Hospital of Iceland, at the age of 28.

== Honours ==
Uganda

- CECAFA Cup: 2009, 2011, 2012
