= Njarðvíkurvöllur =

(Iceland) JBÓ Stadium
- Interactive map of (Iceland) JBÓ Stadium
- Location: Njarðvík, Iceland
- Coordinates: 63.9905131°N 22.6011361°W
- Capacity: 1,400

Tenants
- Njarðvík; Hafnir

Njarðvíkurvöllur (lit. 'Njarðtak Field' (Note: völlurinn is the definite form of völlur, meaning "the field". "Njarðtak" is the name of the sponsor.) or more precisely 'Njarðtak Stadium') is a multi-use stadium in Njarðvík, Iceland. It is currently used mostly for football matches and is the home stadium of Njarðvík FC. Its capacity is around 1400.
