= Njarðvík =

- Town
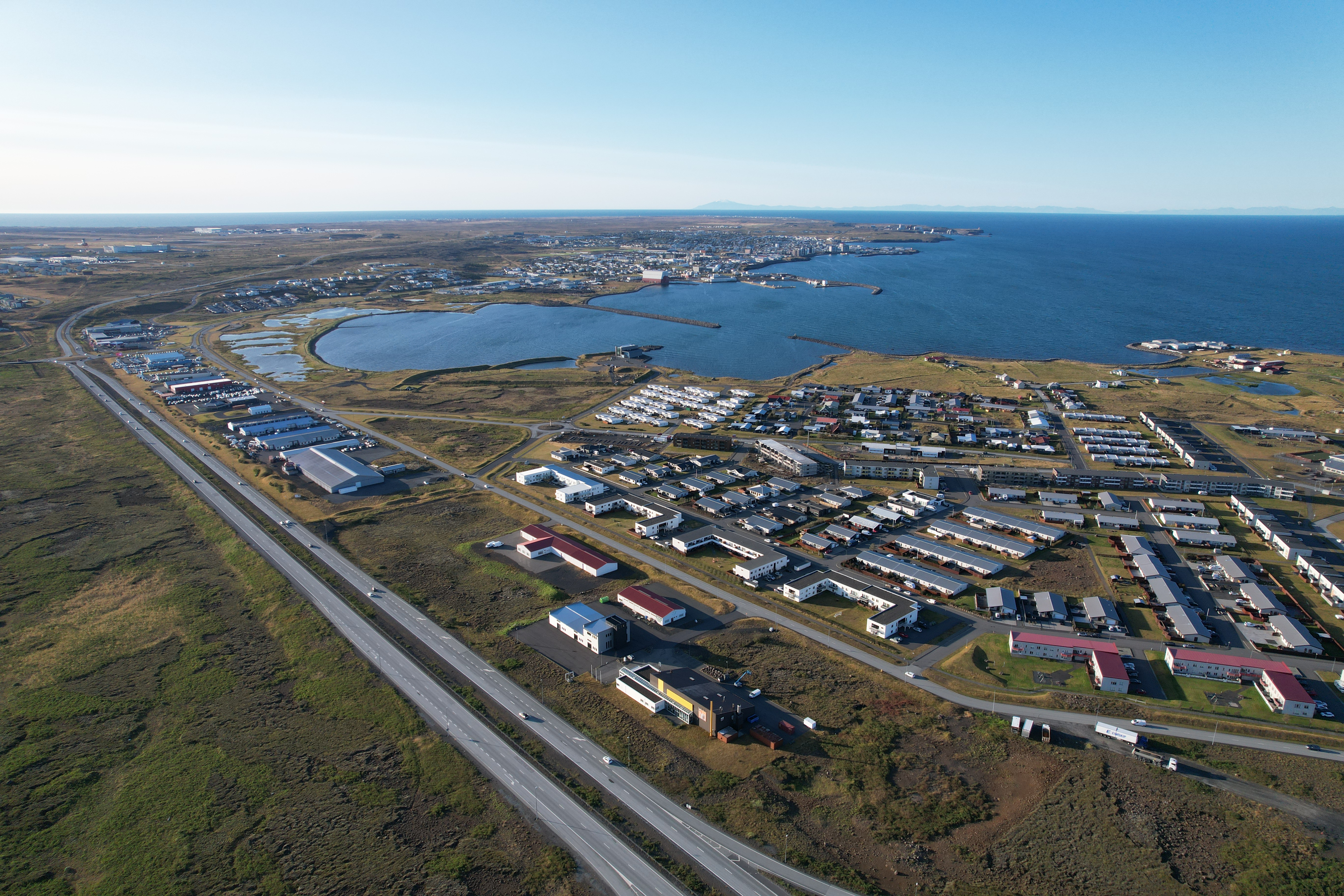
- Aerial view of Innri-Njarðvík

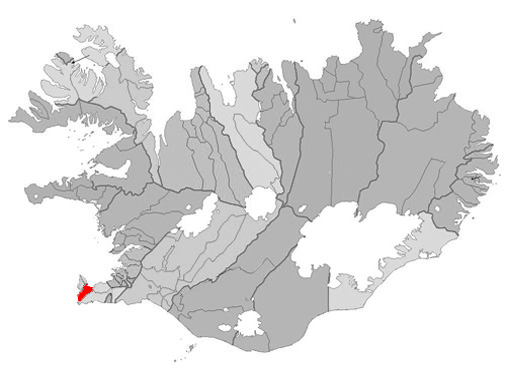
- Location of the Municipality of Reykjanesbaer

- Location in Iceland
- Coordinates: 63°59′00″N 22°33′00″W
- Country: Iceland
- Constituency: South Constituency
- Region: Southern Peninsula
- Municipality: Reykjanesbær

Population (2009)
  - Total: 4,400
- Time zone: UTC+0 (GMT)
- Website: Official website

Njarðvík (Icelandic pronunciation: [ˈnjarðˌviːk]) is a town in Reykjanesbær in southwestern Iceland, on the peninsula of Reykjanes. As of 2025, its population was 10,000.

== History ==
In 1995 it merged with the town of Keflavík and the village of Hafnir to form the new municipality of Reykjanesbær. The area is mentioned in the Icelandic Sagas, Njarðvík means "bay of Njörðr".

== Geography ==
Njarðvík is located in the Reykjanes region of Reykjavík, adjacent to Keflavík. It consists of two parts: Innri Njarðvík [ˈɪnːrɪ] and Ytri Njarðvík [ˈɪːtrɪ] (inner and outer Njarðvík). In the old town is the Njarðvíkurkirkja Innri [ˈnjarðˌviːkʏrˌcʰɪr̥ca ˈɪnːrɪ], a stone church built in 1886.

== Climate ==
Climate data for Njarðvík
Month	Jan	Feb	Mar	Apr	May	Jun	Jul	Aug	Sep	Oct	Nov	Dec	Year
Mean daily maximum °C (°F)	2 (35)	2 (35)	3 (37)	5 (41)	8 (46)	11 (51)	12 (53)	12 (53)	9 (48)	6 (42)	4 (39)	2 (35)	6 (42)
Mean daily minimum °C (°F)	−2 (28)	−1 (30)	−1 (30)	0 (32)	3 (37)	6 (42)	8 (46)	8 (46)	5 (41)	2 (35)	0 (32)	−1 (30)	2 (35)
Average precipitation mm (inches)	99 (3.9)	97 (3.8)	97 (3.8)	74 (2.9)	66 (2.6)	64 (2.5)	64 (2.5)	86 (3.4)	94 (3.7)	110 (4.5)	110 (4.3)	110 (4.4)	1,080 (42.4)
Source: Weatherbase

== Sports ==
As of 2025, UMF Njarðvík's men's football team plays in the 2nd tier of the Icelandic football pyramid. They play their home games at the JBÓ Stadium.

== Notable residents ==
- Brenton Birmingham (born 1972), American-Icelandic basketball player

== See also ==
- Viking World museum
- Ungmennafélag Njarðvíkur
