= Guy Smit =

Dutch association football player

Personal information
- Date of birth: 19 January 1996 (age 30)
- Place of birth: Doetinchem, Netherlands
- Height: 1.95 m (6 ft 5 in)
- Position: Goalkeeper

Team information
- Current team: Njarðvík
- Number: 1

Youth career
- DZC '68
- Vitesse
- NEC

Senior career*
Years	Team	Apps	(Gls)
2015–2016	NEC	0	(0)
2016–2019	Eindhoven	3	(0)
2020–2021	Leiknir	41	(0)
2022–2023	Valur	10	(0)
2023	→ ÍBV (loan)	22	(0)
2024	KR	26	(0)
2025	Vestri	27	(0)
2026–	Njarðvík	24	(0)
- * Club domestic league appearances and goals as of 14 October 2026

Guy Smit (born 19 January 1996) is a Dutch professional footballer who plays as a goalkeeper for Icelandic club Njarðvík.

== Club career ==
Born in Doetinchem, Gelderland, Smit joined the youth academy of Dutch top flight side Vitesse at the age of 17 after playing for the youth academy of DZC '68 in the Dutch seventh division.

In 2016, he signed for Dutch second division club FC Eindhoven after trialing for Arsenal, one of the most successful teams in England, where he made 3 league appearances and scored 0 goals and suffered a double fracture. On 12 April 2019, Smit debuted for FC Eindhoven during a 1–2 loss to Roda JC. After that, he almost signed for an English outfit.

In 2020, he signed for Leiknir in the Icelandic second division after receiving an offer from Cypriot side Ermis Aradippou, helping them achieve promotion to the Icelandic top flight.

In the fall of 2021 he signed for Icelandic giants Valur, set to replace former Icelandic national goalkeeper Hannes Þór Halldórsson.

In February 2025, Smith signed with Besta deild karla club Vestri. On 22 August 2025, he won the Icelandic Cup with Vestri.
