= Guðgeir Leifsson =

Icelandic footballer

Personal information
- Date of birth: 25 September 1951 (age 75)
- Place of birth: Iceland
- Positions: Midfielder; inside forward

Senior career*
Years	Team	Apps	(Gls)
1970–1972	Víkingur		
1973–1974	Fram		
1974–1975	Morton	4	(0)
1975	Fram		
1975–1977	Charleroi		
1977	ÍBV		
1978	FC Bulle		
1979	Edmonton Drillers	24	(3)
1980	FC Bulle		
1981	FH		
1983	Víkingur		
Total		28+	(3+)

International career
1971–1979	Iceland	39	(1)
- * Club domestic league appearances and goals

Guðgeir Leifsson (born 25 September 1951) is an Icelandic former footballer who played at both professional and international levels as a midfielder and inside forward.

== Career ==
Leifsson played club football in Iceland, Scotland, Belgium, Switzerland and Canada for Víkingur, Fram, Morton, Charleroi, IBV, FC Bulle, Edmonton Drillers and FH.

He also played for the Iceland national team, appearing in 12 FIFA World Cup qualifying matches in the process.
