= Handknattleiksfélag Kópavogs =

Icelandic sports club

HK
- Full name: Handknattleiksfélag Kópavogs
- Founded: 26 January 1970; 56 years ago
- Ground: Kórinn, Kópavogur, Iceland
- Capacity: 5,501 (1,869 seated)
- Chairman: Sigurjón Sigurðsson
- Manager: Gunnar Heiðar Þorvaldsson
- League: 1. deild karla
- 2025: 1. deild karla, 4th of 12
- Website: www.hk.is
Home colours	Away colours

Handknattleiksfélag Kópavogs ("Kópavogur Handball Club"), commonly abbreviated to HK, is an Icelandic sports club from the town of Kópavogur. There are six divisions within the club and they are: handball, football, volleyball, dance, table tennis and bandy.

== History ==
The club dates back to 1969, but was officially established on 26 January 1970. They were originally only a handball team, with the football team established in 1992. They bounced around in lower divisions until, in the summer of 2007 they first played in the Icelandic top division, the Úrvalsdeild. The club were relegated in their second season to the second tier and were again relegated to the third tier in 2011. They returned to the top tier, and placed 9th out of 12 in the 2019 Úrvalsdeild.

As of 2025, HK's football team plays in the 1. deild karla (Iceland's second-level league) after being demoted from the Besta deild karla (the top Icelandic league) in 2024.

== Men's football ==
=== Achievements ===
- 2. deild karla (3): 1997, 2002, 2013
- 3. deild karla (2): 1992, 2001

=== Current squad ===
As of 22 July 2026

Note: Flags indicate national team as defined under FIFA eligibility rules; some limited exceptions apply. Players may hold more than one non-FIFA nationality.

No.	Pos.	Nation	Player
1	GK	ISL	Ólafur Örn Ásgeirsson
4	DF	ISL	Aron Kristófer Lárusson
5	DF	ISL	Thorsteinn Antonsson
6	MF	ISL	Þorvaldur Jónsson
8	MF	ISL	Arnþor Ari Atlason
9	FW	ISL	Jóhann Þór Arnarsson
10	FW	ISL	Atli Hrafn Andrason
14	MF	ISL	Brynjar Snaer Pálsson
15	DF	ISL	Birgir Steinn Styrmisson (on loan from KR)
16	DF	ISL	Svavar Örn Þórðarson
17	FW	CRO	Dominik Radić
18	MF	ISL	Robert Quental Árnason

No.	Pos.	Nation	Player
19	MF	ISL	Atli Þór Gunnarsson
20	DF	ISL	Breki Hólm Baldursson
21	DF	ISL	Ívar Örn Jónsson
22	DF	ISL	Haukur Leifur Eiríksson
23	MF	ISL	Baldvin Dagur Vigfússon
24	MF	ISL	Magnús Arnar Pétursson
25	GK	ISL	Andri Már Steinsson
26	DF	ISL	Viktor Helgi Benediktsson
27	FW	ISL	Karl Ágúst Karlsson
28	FW	ISL	Tumi Þorvarsson
45	FW	ISL	Alexander Örn Guðmundsson
73	DF	ISL	Nökkvi Arnarson

=== Out on loan ===
Note: Flags indicate national team as defined under FIFA eligibility rules; some limited exceptions apply. Players may hold more than one non-FIFA nationality.

No.	Pos.	Nation	Player
12	GK	ISL	Stéfan Stéfansson (at Ýmir Kópavogur until 31 January 2027)
—	GK	ISL	Jón Þór Valdimarsson (at Hvöt until 31 January 2027)

No.	Pos.	Nation	Player
—	GK	ISL	Reynir Leó Egilsson (at Ýmir Kópavogur until 31 January 2027)
7	FW	ISL	Dagur Ingi Axelsson (at Fjölnir until 31 January 2027)
