= Frederik Schram =

Danish-Icelandic footballer (born 1995)

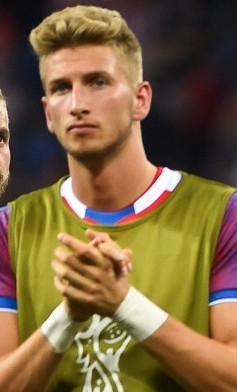
- Schram with Iceland at the 2018 FIFA World Cup

Personal information
- Full name: Frederik August Albrecht Schram
- Date of birth: 19 January 1995 (age 31)
- Place of birth: Dragør, Denmark
- Height: 1.98 m (6 ft 6 in)
- Position: Goalkeeper

Team information
- Current team: Valur
- Number: 18

Youth career
- 201?–2014: OB

Senior career*
Years	Team	Apps	(Gls)
2014–2015	Vestsjælland	0	(0)
2016–2019	Roskilde	84	(0)
2019	SønderjyskE	0	(0)
2019	→ Lyngby (loan)	0	(0)
2020–2022	Lyngby	4	(0)
2022–2024	Valur	55	(0)
2025	Roskilde	4	(0)
2025–	Valur	38	(0)

International career^{‡}
2011	Iceland U-17	3	(0)
2012–2013	Iceland U-19	3	(0)
2014–2015	Iceland U-21	6	(0)
2017–2023	Iceland	7	(0)
- * Club domestic league appearances and goals as of 16 November 2026 ‡ National team caps and goals as of 18 March 2023

Frederik August Albrecht Schram (born 19 January 1995) is a professional footballer who plays for as a goalkeeper for Valur. Born in Denmark, he plays for the Iceland national team internationally.

== Club career ==
Frederik is a product of Danish Dragør Boldklub and as a teenager Odense Boldklub youth academy.

In May 2019, Schram left FC Roskilde and joined SønderjyskE on a contract for the rest of 2019. One month after his arrival, Schram was loaned out to Lyngby Boldklub for the rest of 2019. However, his contract was not extended by the end of the year and he left the club, becoming a free agent.

On 14 January 2020, Schram made a permanent transfer to Lyngby BK, signing a six-month contract. He suffered relegation to the Danish 1st Division with the club on 9 May 2021 after a loss to last placed AC Horsens. On 24 June 2022 it was confirmed, that Schram had signed with Icelandic giants Valur, he signed a two-year contract running until the end of 2024.

At the end of November 2024, Schram signed with his former club, FC Roskilde, which he would join from January 2025 on a free transfer.

On 25 April 2025, Schram returned to Icelandic giants Valur, signing a three-year contract.

== International career ==
Schram was born in Denmark to a Danish father and an Icelandic mother. Frederik represented Iceland in the youth international level and was called up to the senior national team in November 2015 for matches against Poland and Slovakia, but did not make a debut. He made his first international appearance on 9 February 2017 in a friendly match against Mexico.

In May 2018 he was named in Iceland's 23-man squad for the 2018 World Cup in Russia.

== Career statistics ==
=== Club ===
As of 20 August 2021

Appearances and goals by club, season and competition
Club	Season	League			Cup		Europe		Other		Total	
Club	Season	Division	Apps	Goals	Apps	Goals	Apps	Goals	Apps	Goals	Apps	Goals
Vestsjælland	2014–15	Superliga	0	0	0	0	—		—		0	0
Vestsjælland	2015–16	1st Division	0	0	0	0	—		—		0	0
Vestsjælland	Total		0	0	0	0	0	0	0	0	0	0
Roskilde	2015–16	1st Division	6	0	0	0	—		—		6	0
Roskilde	2016–17	1st Division	29	0	0	0	—		—		29	0
Roskilde	2017–18	1st Division	28	0	0	0	—		—		28	0
Roskilde	2018–19	1st Division	21	0	0	0	—		—		21	0
Roskilde	Total		84	0	0	0	0	0	0	0	84	0
SønderjyskE	2019–20	Superliga	0	0	0	0	—		—		0	0
Lyngby (loan)	2019–20	Superliga	0	0	1	0	—		—		1	0
Lyngby	2019–20	Superliga	1	0	0	0	—		—		1	0
Lyngby	2020–21	Superliga	2	0	3	0	—		—		5	0
Lyngby	2021–22	1st Division	0	0	0	0	—		—		0	0
Lyngby	Total		3	0	4	0	0	0	0	0	7	0
Valur	2022	Besta Deildin	0	0	0	0	0	0				
Valur	Career total		87	0	4	0	0	0	0	0	91	0

=== International ===
As of match played 12 January 2023

Appearances and goals by national team and year
National team	Year	Apps	Goals
Iceland	2017	1	0
Iceland	2018	3	0
Iceland	2019	1	0
Iceland	2022	1	0
Iceland	2023	1	0
Total		7	0
