= Njarðvík (men's football) =

Ungmennafélagið Njarðvík
- Full name: Ungmennafélagið Njarðvík
- Short name: UMFN, Njarðvík
- Founded: 1968
- Ground: JBÓ Stadium, Njarðvík
- Capacity: 2.500 (500 seated)
- Chairman: Hjalti Már Brynjarsson
- Manager: Davíð Smári
- League: 1. deild karla
- 2025: 1. deild karla, 2nd of 12
- Website: umfn.is/flokkur/fotbolti/
Home colours	Away colours	Third colours

Njarðvík FC (Icelandic pronunciation: [ˈnjarðˌviːk]), commonly known as Njarðvík or UMFN, is the men's football department of Ungmennafélag Njarðvíkur multi-sport club, based in the town of Reykjanesbær in Iceland. It currently plays in the Icelandic football league system second-tier 1. deild karla.

== Honours ==
- 2. deild karla
  - Champions (3): 1981, 2017, 2022
- League Cup B
  - Champions (2): 2003, 2022
  - Runner-up (2): 2012, 2017

== Current squad ==
As of 5 August 2026

Note: Flags indicate national team as defined under FIFA eligibility rules; some limited exceptions apply. Players may hold more than one non-FIFA nationality.

No.	Pos.	Nation	Player
1	GK	NED	Guy Smit
2	DF	CPV	Félix Mathaus
3	DF	ISL	Sigurjón Már Markússon
4	DF	ISL	Viðar Már Ragnarsson
5	DF	ISL	Arnar Helgi Magnússon
6	DF	ISL	Arnleifur Hjörleifsson
7	FW	ISL	Bragi Karl Bjarkason
8	MF	NED	Leandro Fernandes
9	FW	BEL	Oumar Diouck
10	FW	ISL	Valdimar Jóhannsson
11	FW	ISL	Freysteinn Ingi Guðnason
12	GK	ISL	Daði Fannar Reinhardsson
14	MF	ISL	Aron Einarsson

No.	Pos.	Nation	Player
15	FW	POR	Rafael Victor (on loan from Grindavík)
16	FW	ISL	Hrafn Gudmundsson
17	MF	ISL	Símon Logi Thasaphong
18	DF	ISL	Björn Aron Björnsson
19	MF	ISL	Tómas Bjarki Jónsson
20	DF	ISL	Erlendur Guðnason
21	MF	ISL	Alexander Helgi Sigurðarson (on loan from KR)
22	DF	ISL	Stefán Gísli Stefánsson (on loan from Valur)
23	DF	ISL	Eiður Sigurbjörnsson
26	MF	ISL	Haraldur Smári Ingason
27	DF	ISL	Jóhann Ægir Arnarsson (on loan from FH)
33	DF	ISL	Haraldur Ágúst Brynjarsson (on loan from Víkingur)
66	MF	ISL	Viktor Vidarsson (on loan from FH)

=== Out on loan ===
Note: Flags indicate national team as defined under FIFA eligibility rules; some limited exceptions apply. Players may hold more than one non-FIFA nationality.

No. / Pos. / Nation / Player; 31 / GK / ISL / Andrés Már Kjartansson (at FC Árbær until 31 January 2027)	No. / Pos. / Nation / Player
