= Þór Akureyri (men's football) =

- Full name: Íþróttafélagið Þór
- Nickname: Þórsarar
- Founded: 6 June 1915; 111 years ago
- Ground: Þórsvöllur, Akureyri
- Capacity: 984
- Chairman: Nói Bjornsson
- Manager: Sigurdur Heidar Hoskuldsson
- League: Besta deild karla
- 2026: Besta deild karla, 10th of 12
Home colours	Away colours

The Þór Akureyri men's football team, commonly known as Þór Akureyri (Icelandic pronunciation: [ˈθouːr̥ ˈaːkʏrˌeiːrɪ]), is the men's football department of Þór Akureyri multi sports club, based in the town of Akureyri in Iceland. The club currently plays in the Besta deild karla, the highest tier of Icelandic football.

== History ==
On 18 September 2010, Þór won against Fjarðabyggð to move into second place in the second division of Icelandic football, 1. deild karla. Going into the game, Þór had to win and they also needed Leiknir to lose in order to go into second place since Leiknir was 3 points clear of them. This was their last gasp to reach promotion to the top flight football of Iceland, Úrvalsdeild. Even though Þór already had a superior goal difference, they defeated Fjarðabyggðar 9–1 in a thrashing. Leiknir played their match at the same time and so knew they needed to at least draw to earn promotion as the scoreline was always in Þór's favor. However, only 5 minutes into the game Leiknir's opponent Fjölnir scored on a strike from forward Pétur Georg Markan. Leiknir found a response in the 44th minute, but it would not be enough. Just before the half, Pétur added a second goal for Fjölnir. Then, came the dagger, a 47th-minute strike by none other than Pétur to begin the second half left Leiknir stunned. He had completed his treble and although Leiknir was not out of it by any means, they would not be able to pull another goal back.

In the first meeting of the season between the two Reykjavík teams, with five minutes remaining and Leiknir winning 3–2, Fjölnir leveled in the 87th minute. Then in stoppage time, Aron Jóhannsson completed his treble for Fjölnir and Leiknir had lost. So, Þór returned to top flight for the first time since 2002, finishing runner-up to Víkingur Reykjavík.

In 2011, Þór lost to KR, 0–2, in the Icelandic Cup finals.

== Supporters and rivalries ==
Þór's main rivals are fellow Akureyri club KA. Support for the two clubs is traditionally split along the Glerá river, with Þór drawing most of their support base from neighborhoods north of the river.

== Players ==
=== Current squad ===
As of 15 August 2026

Note: Flags indicate national team as defined under FIFA eligibility rules; some limited exceptions apply. Players may hold more than one non-FIFA nationality.

No.	Pos.	Nation	Player
1	GK	ISL	Aron Birkir Stefánsson
2	DF	ISL	Ásbjörn Líndal Arnarsson
3	DF	ISL	Birgir Ómar Hlynsson
4	MF	ISL	Hermann Helgi Rúnarsson
5	DF	CIV	Yann Emmanuel Affi
6	DF	ISL	Gyrðir Hrafn Guðbrandsson (on loan from KR)
7	FW	ISL	Atli Sigurjónsson
8	DF	ISL	Einar Freyr Halldórsson
9	FW	ESP	Víctor Bertomeu
10	MF	ISL	Aron Ingi Magnússon
11	FW	GHA	Isaac Atanga
14	MF	ISL	Smári Viðarsson
15	FW	ISL	Kristófer Kristjánsson
16	MF	ISL	Bjarni Guðjón Brynjólfsson (on loan from FH)

No.	Pos.	Nation	Player
17	FW	ISL	Fannar Daði Gislason
18	DF	ISL	Sverrir Páll Ingason
19	DF	ISL	Ragnar Óli Ragnarsson
20	DF	ISL	Vilhelm Ottó Biering Ottósson
22	MF	ISL	Ágúst Hlynsson
23	DF	ESP	Kevin Vázquez
25	MF	DEN	Christian Greko Jakobsen
27	MF	ISL	Nökkvi Hjörvarsson
28	GK	CRO	Franko Lalić
30	FW	ISL	Peter Ingi Helgason
31	DF	ISL	Kristófer Friðriksson
35	FW	ISL	Þorri Ingólfsson (on loan from Víkingur U19)
37	FW	ISL	Sigfús Fannar Gunnarsson

=== Out on loan ===
Note: Flags indicate national team as defined under FIFA eligibility rules; some limited exceptions apply. Players may hold more than one non-FIFA nationality.

No.	Pos.	Nation	Player
12	GK	ISL	Víðir Jökull Valdimarsson (at Magni Grenivík until 31 January 2027)
24	DF	ISL	Ýmir Már Geirsson (at Magni Grenivík until 31 January 2027)
27	MF	ISL	Atli Þór Sindrason (at Dalvík/Reynir until 31 January 2027)

No.	Pos.	Nation	Player
—	DF	ISL	Pétur Orri Arnason (at Magni Grenivík until 31 January 2027)
—	DF	ISL	Davíð Örn Aðalsteinsson (at Íþróttafélagið Völsungur until 31 January 2027)
—	MF	ISL	Kristófer Máni Sigurdsson (at Huginn until 31 January 2027)

=== Former players ===
For details of current and former players, see Category:Þór Akureyri players.

== Managers ==
- (Iceland) Páll Viðar Gíslason (1 July 2009 – 4 October 2014)
- (Iceland) Halldór Jón Sigurðsson (1 January 2015 – 24 September 2016)
- (Iceland) Lárus Sigurðsson (29 September 2016 – 5 October 2018)
- (England) Gregg Ryder (5 October 2018 – 21 September 2019)
- (Iceland) Páll Viðar Gíslason (18 October 2019 – 1 October 2020)
- (Iceland) Orri Freyr Hjaltalín (15 October 2020 – 18 September 2021)
- (Iceland) Thorlakur Mar Arnason (30 October 2021 – 15 October 2023)
- (Iceland) Sigurður Heiðar Höskuldsson
