= Lambhagavöllur =

Sports venue in Reykjavík, Iceland

(Iceland) Lambhagavöllur
- Interactive map of (Iceland) Lambhagavöllur
- Location: Úlfarsárdal, Reykjavík, Iceland
- Coordinates: 64.1313175°N 21.7359524°W
- Capacity: 1,200

Tenants
- Fram; Úlfarnir

Lambhagavöllur is a multi-use stadium in Reykjavík, Iceland. It is currently used mostly for football matches and is the home stadium of Knattspyrnufélagið Fram. Its capacity is around 1200.
