= ÍBV (men's football) =

- Full name: ÍBV-íþróttafélag
- Short name: ÍBV
- Founded: 1903; 123 years ago as KV
- Ground: Hásteinsvöllur; Vestmannaeyjar, Iceland
- Capacity: 2,300 (534 seated)
- Manager: Þorlákur Árnason
- League: 1. deild karla
- 2026: Besta deild karla, 12th of 12 (Relegated)
- Website: https://ibvsport.is/
| Home colours | Away colours |

The ÍBV men's football team is the men's football department of the ÍBV-íþróttafélag (English: ÍBV sports club) multi-sport club. It is located in Vestmannaeyjar, Iceland, and currently plays in the 1. deild karla, the second-tier men's football league in Iceland. The team plays its home games at the Hásteinsvöllur. It has won the Icelandic championship three times, in 1979, 1997 and 1998.

== Achievements ==
- Icelandic Championships: 3

1979, 1997, 1998

- Icelandic Cups: 5

1968, 1972, 1981, 1998, 2017

- Icelandic League Cup: 1

1997

== European record ==
As of 25 July 2013.

| Competition | Pld | W | D | L |
|---|---|---|---|---|
| European Cup / UEFA Champions League | 8 | 2 | 1 | 5 |
| European Cup Winners' Cup / UEFA Cup Winners' Cup | 12 | 2 | 0 | 10 |
| UEFA Cup / UEFA Europa League | 24 | 3 | 8 | 13 |
| Total | 44 | 7 | 9 | 28 |

== Players ==
=== Current squad ===
As of 15 August 2026

Note: Flags indicate national team as defined under FIFA eligibility rules; some limited exceptions apply. Players may hold more than one non-FIFA nationality.

| No. | Pos. | Nation | Player |
|---|---|---|---|
| 1 | GK | SRB | Ivan Vidrih |
| 2 | DF | ISL | Sigurður Arnar Magnússon |
| 3 | MF | ISL | Alexander Örn Fridriksson |
| 4 | DF | SWE | Mattias Edeland |
| 5 | MF | ISL | Sturla Kristjánsson |
| 6 | MF | SRB | Milan Tomić |
| 8 | FW | ISL | Bjarki Björn Gunnarsson |
| 9 | FW | ISL | Liam Daði Jeffs |
| 10 | MF | ISL | Viggó Valgeirsson |
| 11 | MF | ISL | Aron Vokes |
| 16 | MF | ISL | Sigurdur Valur Sigursveinsson |
| 17 | MF | ISL | Emil Gautason |
| 20 | FW | ISL | Sesar Örn Harðarson |

| No. | Pos. | Nation | Player |
|---|---|---|---|
| 22 | DF | ISL | Eiður Atli Rúnarsson |
| 23 | DF | ISL | Arnór Ingi Kristinsson |
| 24 | MF | ISL | Hermann Þór Ragnarsson |
| 25 | MF | ISL | Alex Freyr Hilmarsson |
| 26 | DF | ISL | Felix Örn Friðriksson |
| 27 | MF | ISL | Róbert Elís Hlynsson (on loan from KR) |
| 28 | FW | ISL | Heiðmar Þór Magnússon |
| 30 | MF | ESP | Vicente Valor |
| 31 | GK | FRO | Ari Petersen |
| 42 | MF | POR | Vítor Hugo Cruz Rocha |
| 67 | FW | GAM | Omar Sowe |
| 80 | FW | ISL | Halldór Þórðarson |

=== Out on loan ===
Note: Flags indicate national team as defined under FIFA eligibility rules; some limited exceptions apply. Players may hold more than one non-FIFA nationality.

| No. | Pos. | Nation | Player |
|---|---|---|---|
| 14 | FW | ISL | Arnar Breki Gunnarsson (at Grindavík until 31 January) |

=== Notable players ===
Players who have played for ÍBV and have more than one international cap for their country.

- (England) David James
- (Greece) George Baldock
- (Faroe Islands) Allan Mørkøre
- (Iceland) Baldur Bragason
- (Iceland) Einar Þór Daníelsson
- (Iceland) Arnljótur Davíðsson
- (Iceland) Friðrik Friðriksson
- (Iceland) Tryggvi Guðmundsson
- (Iceland) Heimir Hallgrímsson
- (Iceland) Hermann Hreiðarsson
- (Iceland) Ívar Ingimarsson
- (Iceland) Birkir Kristinsson
- (Iceland) Guðgeir Leifsson
- (Iceland) Sigurvin Ólafsson
- (Iceland) Örn Óskarsson
- (Iceland) Tómas Pálsson
- (Iceland) Ásgeir Sigurvinsson
- (Iceland) Ólafur Sigurvinsson
- (Iceland) Rútur Snorrason
- (Iceland) Hlynur Stefánsson
- (Iceland) Sverrir Sverrisson
- (Iceland) Sigurlás Þorleifsson
- (Iceland) Gunnar Heiðar Þorvaldsson
- (Iceland) Tómas Ingi Tómasson
- (Scotland) David Moyes
- (Uganda) Abel Dhaira
- (Uganda) Tony Mawejje
- (Uganda) Andrew Mwesigwa

== Managers ==
- (Iceland) Heimir Hallgrímsson (Aug 1, 2006–Dec 31, 2011)
- (Iceland) Magnús Gylfason (Jan 1, 2012–Sept 19, 2012)
- (Serbia) Dragan Kažić (Sept 20, 2012–Dec 31, 2012)
- (Iceland) Hermann Hreiðarsson (Jan 1, 2013–Oct 3, 2013)
- (Iceland) Sigurður Ragnar Eyjólfsson (2014)
- (Iceland) Jóhannes Harðarson (Jan 1, 2015–June 24, 2015)
- (Iceland) Sigurður Ragnar Eyjólfsson (July 22, 2015–Oct 3, 2015)
- (Iceland) Bjarni Jóhannsson (Oct 9, 2015–Aug 19, 2016)
- (Iceland) Kristján Guðmundsson (Oct 15, 2016–Sept 29, 2018)
- (Portugal) Pedro Hipólito (Sept 29, 2018–June 30, 2019)
- (Iceland) Helgi Sigurðsson (Oct 1, 2019–)
