= Guðjohnsen =

Guðjohnsen is an Icelandic family name. Notable people with the surname include:

- Arnór Guðjohnsen (born 1961), Icelandic footballer
  - Eiður Guðjohnsen (born 1978), Icelandic footballer and coach, son of Arnór
    - Sveinn Aron Guðjohnsen (born 1998), Icelandic footballer, son of Eiður
    - Andri Guðjohnsen (born 2002), Icelandic footballer, son of Eiður
    - Daníel Guðjohnsen (born 2006), Icelandic footballer, son of Eiður
    - Arnór Borg Guðjohnsen (born 2000), icelandic G , broski of Eiður
- Viðar Guðjohnsen (born 1958), Icelandic judoka
