= Petr Mrázek (footballer) =

Czech footballer (born 1969)

Personal information
- Date of birth: 8 January 1961 (age 65)
- Place of birth: Czechoslovakia
- Position: Defender

Senior career*
Years	Team	Apps	(Gls)
1980–1983	Sigma Olomouc	18	(1)
1983–1984	VTJ Tachov		
1984–1988	Sigma Olomouc	16	(0)
1988–1989	Viktoria Plzeň	17	(1)
1989–1991	Sigma Olomouc	15	(2)
1991–1993	Schweinfurt	9	(0)
1993–1994	FH	25	(1)
1995	Valur	21	(1)
1995	FH	21	(1)
1997	Würzburger Kickers		
- * Club domestic league appearances and goals

Petr Mrázek (born 8 January 1961) is a Czech former footballer. He played as a defender.

== Early life ==
Mrázek was born in 1961 in Czechoslovakia. He joined the youth academy of Czech side SK Sigma Olomouc at the age of six.

== Career ==
Mrázek started his career with Czech side SK Sigma Olomouc. He helped the club achieve promotion. In 1983, he signed for Czech side VTJ Tachov. In 1984, he returned to Sigma Olomouc. In 1988, he signed for Viktoria Plzeň. In 1989, he signed for Sigma Olomouc. In 1991, he signed for German side Schweinfurt. In 1993, he signed for Icelandic side FH. In 1995, he signed for Icelandic side Valur. In 1995, he returned to FH. In 1997, he signed for German side Würzburger Kickers. In 1998, he ended professional career and played for Czech amateur club FK Horka nad Moravou.

== Style of play ==
He was known for his height.
