= Logi Ólafsson =

Icelandic football coach

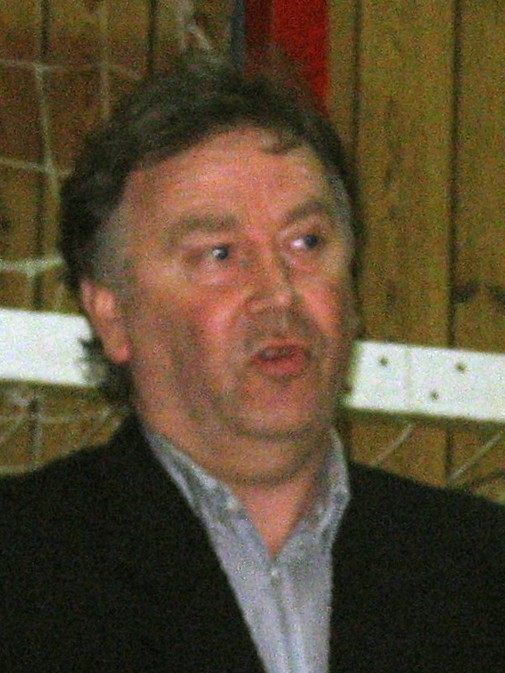
- Logi in 2007

Personal information
- Date of birth: 14 November 1954 (age 71)
- Place of birth: Reykjavík, Iceland

Senior career*
Years	Team	Apps	(Gls)
1972–1981	FH		

International career
1972–1973	Iceland U19	3	(0)

Managerial career
- 1985–1986: FH (assistant)
- 1987–1989: Valur
- 1990–1992: Víkingur
- 1993–1994: Iceland women
- 1995: ÍA
- 1996–1997: Iceland
- 1997–1999: ÍA
- 2000–2001: FH
- 2001–2003: Lillestrøm (assistant)
- 2003–2005: Iceland
- 2007–2010: KR
- 2010–2012: Selfoss
- 2012–2013: Stjarnan
- 2017–2018: Víkingur
- 2020–2021: FH
- * Club domestic league appearances and goals

Logi Ólafsson (born 14 November 1954) is an Icelandic football coach and former player. During his coaching career, he has been the manager of both the Icelandic men's and women's national team.

== Playing career ==
Logi played for FH from 1972 to 1981.

== Managerial career ==
Logi started his coaching career as an assistant coach for FH from 1985 to 1986. In 1987 he became the manager of Valur women's side for two seasons, before moving on to manage Víkingur men's team where he won the Icelandic Championship in 1991. In 1993, following his spell at Víkingur he became the coach of the Iceland women's national football team, but left the following year. He then spent a season at ÍA, winning the Icelandic Championship again in 1995.

Logi Ólafsson was in charge of Iceland men's national team between years 1996 and 1997, before returning to ÍA where they finished 2nd, 3rd and 4th in the years 1997, 1998 and 1999. From 2000 he took on a new challenge in managing the First Division side of FH. He won promotion in his first season and finish 3rd in the 2001 Úrvalsdeild the year after. In the following season he would move to manage Norwegian club Lillestrøm alongside Arne Erlandsen. In 2003, he returned to manage the men's national team, this time in a joint role with Ásgeir Sigurvinsson.

In 2007, he took charge of KR, and won the 2008 Icelandic Cup. Yet he was forced out after three years in charge due to a slow league start. He was not out of a job for long, as he joined Selfoss and won promotion to the 2012 Úrvalsdeild. Overall he stayed there for three seasons. In 2013, Logi transferred to Garðabær to take charge of Stjarnan. He steered them to 3rd place, the club's all-time highest finish at the time, delivering to the club its first ever Europa League Qualification Round.

On 16 July 2020, Logi took over as co-manager of FH, along with Eiður Guðjohnsen.
