= Arnór Borg Guðjohnsen =

Icelandic footballer (born 2000)

Personal information
- Full name: Arnór Borg Guðjohnsen
- Date of birth: 16 September 2000 (age 26)
- Position: Midfielder

Team information
- Current team: FH
- Number: 90

Youth career
- Breiðablik
- 2017–2020: Swansea City

Senior career*
Years	Team	Apps	(Gls)
2020–2021	Fylkir	28	(3)
2022–2023	Víkingur Reykjavík	24	(1)
2023	→ FH (loan)	5	(0)
2024–	FH	45	(2)
2025	→ Vestri (loan)	2	(1)

International career^{‡}
2018	Iceland U19	1	(2)
- * Club domestic league appearances and goals as of 16 November 2026 ‡ National team caps and goals as of 10:00, 2 December 2022 (UTC)

Arnór Borg Guðjohnsen (born 16 September 2000) is an Icelandic footballer who plays as a midfielder for FH.

== Club career ==
Arnór signed for Welsh club Swansea City from Breiðablik in July 2017. He became a regular player for their under-18 Academy side. He suffered a series of injuries in April 2019, and was out of action for 7 months before returning to play in December 2019.

In May 2020 he returned to Iceland to train, and signed for Fylkir in June 2020, after being released by Swansea.

In September 2021 it was announced that he would transfer to Víkingur Reykjavík for the 2022 season.

In 2023, he signed for Icelandic side FH on loan, and in 2024 made the transfer permanent.

In April 2025, he joined Vestri on a loan. On 22 August 2025, he won the Icelandic Cup with Vestri.

== International career ==
In September 2018 he was called up by the Icelandic under-19 team.

== Playing style ==
He has described Gylfi Sigurðsson, a fellow Icelandic player who also played for Swansea City, as his idol. Like Sigurðsson, he plays behind the strikers as an advanced midfielder.

== Personal life ==
His father Arnór and half-brother Eiður were both footballers, as are Eiður's sons Sveinn Aron, Andri and Daníel.

== Career statistics ==
As of match played 26 October 2024

Appearances and goals by club, season and competition
Club	Season	League			Icelandic Cup		Continental		Other		Total	
Club	Season	Division	Apps	Goals	Apps	Goals	Apps	Goals	Apps	Goals	Apps	Goals
Swansea City U21	2018–19	—			—		—		0	0	0	0
Fylkir	2020	Úrvalsdeild	17	2	2	2	—		—		19	4
Fylkir	2021	Úrvalsdeild	11	1	0	0	—		—		11	1
Fylkir	Total		28	3	2	2	—		—		30	5
Víkingur Reykjavík	2022	Úrvalsdeild	10	0	1	0	1 (Note: Appearance(s) in UEFA Europa Conference League)	0	0	0	12	0
Víkingur Reykjavík	2023	Úrvalsdeild	14	1	3	2	0	0	1 (Note: Appearance(s) in Icelandic Super Cup)	0	18	3
Víkingur Reykjavík	Total		24	1	4	2	1	0	1	0	30	3
FH (loan)	2023	Úrvalsdeild	5	0	0	0	—		—		5	0
FH	2024	Úrvalsdeild	24	2	1	0	—		—		25	2
Career total			81	6	7	4	1	0	1	0	90	10
