= Sveinn Aron Guðjohnsen =

Icelandic footballer (born 1998)

Personal information
- Date of birth: 12 May 1998 (age 28)
- Place of birth: Reykjavík, Iceland
- Height: 1.89 m (6 ft 2 in)
- Position: Forward

Team information
- Current team: Víkingur Reykjavík
- Number: 27

Youth career
- 2006–2011: Barcelona
- 2011–2015: Gavà

Senior career*
Years	Team	Apps	(Gls)
2015–2016	HK	10	(5)
2016–2017	Valur	12	(1)
2017–2018	Breiðablik	22	(5)
2018–2021	Spezia	23	(2)
2019	→ Ravenna (loan)	11	(1)
2020–2021	→ OB (loan)	13	(1)
2021–2024	Elfsborg	70	(14)
2024	Hansa Rostock	14	(1)
2024	Hansa Rostock II	1	(0)
2024–2026	Sarpsborg	27	(4)
2026	Cavese	13	(2)
2026–	Víkingur Reykjavík	2	(1)

International career^{‡}
2014–2015	Iceland U17	9	(1)
2015–2016	Iceland U19	8	(3)
2018–2021	Iceland U21	17	(7)
2021–2023	Iceland	20	(2)
- * Club domestic league appearances and goals as of 1 May 2026 ‡ National team caps and goals as of 7 May 2023

Sveinn Aron Guðjohnsen (born 12 May 1998) is an Icelandic professional footballer who plays as a forward for Besta deild karla side Víkingur Reykjavík.

== Club career ==
Sveinn Aron spent the first three years of his senior club career in the Icelandic leagues, first 1. deild karla and then the top-level Úrvalsdeild karla.

On 26 July 2018, he signed for Italian club Spezia. He made his Serie B debut for Spezia, on 29 September 2018, in a game against Carpi, as a 59th-minute substitute for Andrey Galabinov.

On 31 January 2019, Sveinn Aron was loaned to Serie C club Ravenna. On 13 September 2020, he was loaned out again, this time to Danish Superliga club Odense Boldklub for the 2020–21 season.

On 14 August 2021, Sveinn Aron signed with IF Elfsborg in Sweden until the end of 2024.

On 18 January 2024, Sveinn Aron joined German club Hansa Rostok of the 2. Bundesliga on a two-and-a-half-year contract.

On 29 August 2024, Sveinn Aron signed a contract until 2028 with Sarpsborg in Norway.

On 28 January 2026, Sveinn Aron signed a contract with Serie C club Cavese, until 30 June 2026, with an option to extend it, if certain conditions were met.

On 11 August 2026, Sveinn Aron signed a contract with Víkingur Reykjavík until 31 December 2026.

== International career ==
Sveinn Aron represented Iceland at the 2021 UEFA European Under-21 Championship, where he started in the first two group stage games, both of which Iceland lost (he scored the squad's only goal at the tournament in a 4–1 loss to Russia). Instead of playing in the closing game on 31 March, he was called up to the senior squad and made his debut for it on the same day in a World Cup qualifier against Liechtenstein.

== Personal life ==
Sveinn Aron's father, Eiður Guðjohnsen, is the joint second-highest goalscorer for the Iceland national football team and played for many notable clubs, such as Bolton Wanderers, Chelsea, Barcelona and Tottenham Hotspur. His grandfather Arnór Guðjohnsen also represented Iceland internationally for many years. His younger brothers Andri and Daniel played for the youth teams of Real Madrid and are both also Iceland internationals. His uncle Arnór Borg (son of Arnór and half-brother of Eiður) plays in Iceland for Fylkir on loan from Championship club Swansea City.

== Career statistics ==
=== Club ===
As of match played 27 September 2025

Appearances and goals by club, season and competition
Club	Season	League			National cup (Note: Includes Icelandic Cup, Coppa Italia, Danish Cup, Svenska Cupen, DFB-Pokal, Norwegian Cup)		Continental		Other		Total	
Club	Season	Division	Apps	Goals	Apps	Goals	Apps	Goals	Apps	Goals	Apps	Goals
HK	2015	1. deild karla	0	0	0	0	—		—		0	0
HK	2016	1. deild karla	10	5	1	0	—		—		11	5
HK	Total		10	5	1	0	—		—		11	5
Valur	2016	Úrvalsdeild	6	0	1	0	0	0	0	0	7	0
Valur	2017	Úrvalsdeild	6	1	2	0	3 (Note: Appearance(s) in UEFA Europa League)	0	1 (Note: Appearance(s) in Icelandic Super Cup)	0	12	1
Valur	Total		12	1	3	0	3	0	1	0	19	1
Breiðablik	2017	Úrvalsdeild	10	2	0	0	—		—		10	2
Breiðablik	2018	Úrvalsdeild	12	3	2	1	—		—		14	4
Breiðablik	Total		22	5	2	1	—		—		24	6
Spezia	2018-19	Serie B	8	0	0	0	—		0	0	8	0
Spezia	2019-20	Serie B	15	2	1	1	—		0	0	16	3
Spezia	Total		23	2	1	1	—		0	0	24	3
Ravenna (loan)	2018–19	Serie C	10	1	0	0	—		1 (Note: Appearance(s) in Serie C Promotion play-offs)	0	11	1
OB (loan)	2020-21	Danish Superliga	13	1	2	1	—		—		15	2
Elfsborg	2021	Allsvenskan	11	3	1	0	1 (Note: Appearance(s) in UEFA Europa Conference League)	0	—		13	3
Elfsborg	2022	Allsvenskan	29	5	4	2	2	0	—		35	7
Elfsborg	2023	Allsvenskan	30	7	1	2	—		—		31	9
Elfsborg	Total		70	15	6	4	3	0	—		79	19
Hansa Rostock	2023-24	2. Bundesliga	12	1	0	0	—		—		12	1
Hansa Rostock	2024-25	3. Liga	2	0	0	0	—		—		2	0
Hansa Rostock	Total		14	1	0	0	—		—		14	1
Hansa Rostock II	2023-24	Regionalliga	1	0	—		—		—		1	0
Sarpsborg	2024	Eliteserien	8	1	0	0	—		—		8	1
Sarpsborg	2025	Eliteserien	16	3	6	6	—		—		22	9
Sarpsborg	Total		24	4	6	6	—		—		30	10
Career total			199	35	21	13	6	0	2	0	226	48

=== International ===
As of match played 12 January 2023

Appearances and goals by national team and year
National team	Year	Apps	Goals
Iceland	2021	8	0
Iceland	2022	9	1
Iceland	2023	2	1
Total		19	2

Scores and results list Iceland's goal tally first, score column indicates score after each Guðjohnsen goal.

List of international goals scored by Sveinn Aron Guðjohnsen
No.	Date	Venue	Opponent	Score	Result	Competition	Ref.
1	15 January 2022	Mardan Sports Complex, Aksu, Turkey	South Korea	1–3	1–5	Friendly	
2	12 January 2023	Estádio Algarve, Algarve, Portugal	Sweden	1–0	1–2	Friendly	

== Honours ==
Valur

- Icelandic Cup: 2016
- Icelandic Super Cup: 2017

Iceland

- Baltic Cup: 2022
