= Ingi Björn Albertsson =

Icelandic footballer and manager (born 1952)

Personal information
- Date of birth: November 3, 1952 (age 73)
- Place of birth: Nice, France
- Position: Striker

Senior career*
Years	Team	Apps	(Gls)
1969–1980	Valur		(90)
1981	FH		(3)
1982–1983	Valur		(18)
1984–1986	FH	33	(14)
1987–1988	Valur	4	(1)
1988–1990	UMF Selfoss		

International career^{‡}
1970	Iceland U19	4	(3)
1978	Iceland U21	1	(0)
1971–1979	Iceland	15	(2)

Managerial career
- 1985–1986: FH
- 1990–1992: Valur
- 1993–1994: Breiðablik
- 1995: Keflavík
- 1995–1996: FH
- 1997: Stjarnan
- 1999: Valur
- * Club domestic league appearances and goals as of 2 January 2018 ‡ National team caps and goals as of 2 January 2018

Ingi Björn Albertsson (born 3 November 1952) is an Icelandic retired footballer who played as a striker, and former manager of the Icelandic Úrvalsdeild. After his playing career, he moved to politics and was a member of Althing, the Icelandic parliament, first in 1987–1991 for Vesturlandskjördæmi for the Citizens' Party (split parties midway through the term) and then in 1991–1995 for Reykjavík for the Independence Party. Ingi Björn was one of the top scorers in Icelandics top division ever with 126 goals, and is currently second in the all-time table, behind Tryggvi Guðmundsson.

== Personal life ==
Ingi Björn's father Albert Guðmundsson is Iceland's first professional footballer. Ingi Björn's daughter, Kristbjörg Ingadóttir, was also a footballer and international for Iceland women's national football team. She married the Icelandic international professional footballer Guðmundur Benediktsson, and their son Albert Guðmundsson (named after Ingi Björn's father) is also a professional footballer and international for the Iceland national football team.
