= Birkir Valur Jónsson =

Icelandic footballer, born 1998

Birkir Jónsson
Personal information
- Full name: Birkir Valur Jónsson
- Date of birth: 2 November 1998 (age 28)
- Place of birth: Reykjavík, Iceland
- Height: 1.86 m (6 ft 1 in)
- Position: Right back

Team information
- Current team: FH
- Number: 2

Youth career
- 2005–2015: HK Kópavogur

Senior career*
Years	Team	Apps	(Gls)
2015−2024	HK Kópavogur	181	(8)
2020	→ Spartak Trnava (loan)	3	(0)
2025−	FH	48	(0)

International career^{‡}
2014	Iceland U16	7	(0)
2015	Iceland U17	8	(0)
2015–2017	Iceland U19	10	(0)
2018–	Iceland U21	10	(0)
- * Club domestic league appearances and goals as of 16 November 2026 ‡ National team caps and goals as of 28 July 2020

Birkir Valur Jónsson (born 2 November 1998) is an Icelandic footballer who plays for FH as a right back.

== Club career ==
Jónsson made his debut for HK in a 3–2 win against KA on 27 June 2015. On 28 July 2020, he joined Spartak Trnava on loan from HK. He returned to HK in January 2021.
