= FH (men's football) =

- Full name: Fimleikafélag Hafnarfjarðar
- Nickname: FH-ingar
- Short name: FH
- Founded: 15 October 1939; 87 years ago
- Ground: Kaplakriki, Hafnarfjörður, Iceland
- Capacity: 6,500 (3,050 seats)
- Chairman: Valdimar Svavarsson
- Manager: Jóhannes Karl Guðjónsson
- League: Besta deild karla
- 2026: Besta deild karla, 9th of 12
- Website: fh.is
Home colours	Away colours	Third colours

The Fimleikafélag Hafnarfjarðar men's football team, commonly referred to as FH, is the men's football department of Fimleikafélag Hafnarfjarðar multi-sport club. It has been a dominant power in Icelandic football since the early 2000s, winning several national championships.

== History ==
=== Early history ===
FH's football department was founded after 1939 when talks between FH and Haukar regarding a joint football team broke down. FH were promoted to the first division in football for the first time in 1975. They avoided relegation by one place and two points in 1979 before being relegated in last place in 1981. FH were promoted back to the top-flight in 1984. They spent a single season in the second division in 1988 and were relegated again in 1995.

=== 21st century ===
After winning the second division in 2000, they came third in the first division in 2001. In 2004 FH won their first national championship, with 37 points to ÍBV's 31.

In the 2004–05 UEFA Cup, FH defeated Haverfordwest County of Wales in the first qualifying round, and then Scottish side Dunfermline Athletic in the second 4–3 on aggregate. With the second leg in injury time and the aggregate score at 3–3, Dunfermline were set to go through on away goals. However, Tommy Nielsen scored in injury time to send the Icelandic part-timers into the first round proper, where they were defeated by Germany's Alemannia Aachen 5–1 on aggregate with all the goals in the first leg in Iceland.

As Icelandic champion of 2004, FH represented the country in the 2005–06 UEFA Champions League, losing to Neftchi Baku of Azerbaijan by 2–0 in the first leg and by 1–2 in the second leg [4–1 on aggregate] of the first qualifying round.

The team won the Icelandic championship for the third year in a row in 2006 after winning the division with 36 points out of 54. Tryggvi Guðmundsson became the team's top-scorer with eight goals that season. In summer 2006 three of the club's players played for the national team: Daði Lárusson, Sigurvin Ólafsson and Ármann Smári Björnsson. Ármann Smári also joined Norwegian team Brann after a superb spell for the first 15 rounds. Baldur Bett also left the squad at the end of the season and joined rivals Valur on a free transfer.

The club stadium Kaplakriki underwent a major redevelopment: the southern stand expanded, bringing the seating capacity to 3,500. There are further plans to increase the seating capacity to nearly 6,000 which would make the stadium by far the largest in Iceland, excluding the Laugardalsvöllur stadium. Also to be built are some new club houses, an indoor track and field centre and a roof over the stands.

On 20 October 2006 the club signed the Icelandic twins Arnar and Bjarki Gunnlaugsson, who have played for Bolton Wanderers F.C., Stoke City F.C., Feyenoord Rotterdam, 1. FC Nürnberg and Leicester City F.C. The twins were transferred to their childhood club Íþróttabandalag Akraness in late July 2008. On 1 November 2006 the club signed the 26-year-old Matthías Guðmundsson from Valur.

The 2007 season saw FH finishing second in the premier division behind main rivals Valur, after losing to them in one of the final games of the season. FH won the Icelandic Cup with a 2–1 victory over Fjölnir in the cup final which secured them a place in the UEFA Cup qualification round.

In October 2007, Ólafur Jóhannesson resigned as FH manager to take over the Icelandic national side. In his five years in control of FH, the team won the Premier division three times, were placed second twice, won the league cup three times and the cup once. Heimir Guðjónsson, former assistant-manager and former FH captain, was hired as his replacement.

On 1 August 2008 the club was drawn against F.A. Premier League team Aston Villa in the Second Qualifying Round of the UEFA Cup. They were beaten 4–1 in the home leg on 14 August, and drew 1–1 in the away tie at Villa Park on 28 August, losing 5–2 on aggregate.

On 27 September 2008 FH won the Icelandic Premier division for the fourth time in 5 years. In one of the most exciting last days of the competition ever, their main rivals Keflavík were odds-on favorites to win the title with a 2-point lead over FH going into the last round. FH had a game against Fylkir while Keflavík played hosts to Fram, who themselves had to win to secure third place and the last spot in the UEFA Cup next season. FH had to win their game by two goals to benefit from a draw in Keflavík. In the event FH beat Fylkir 2–0 for FH with goals from Matthías Vilhjálmsson and Guðmundur Sævarsson, while Keflavík, after being a goal up lost 2–1 to Fram. Captain Davíð Þór Viðarsson lifted the trophy to the dismay of the Keflavík fans.

They took part in the 2010–11 UEFA Champions League after winning the league in 2009. They then finished second in the league in 2010 and 2011 and won the league in 2012 for the tenth top-two finish in a row. In 2015 and 2016, they won the Icelandic premier division title back to back.

== Honours ==
- Icelandic Champion: 8
  - 2004, 2005, 2006, 2008, 2009, 2012, 2015, 2016
- Icelandic Cups: 2
  - 2007, 2010
- Icelandic League Cups: 7
  - 2002, 2004, 2006, 2007, 2009, 2014, 2022
- Icelandic Super Cup: 6
  - 2005, 2007, 2009, 2010, 2011, 2013

== UEFA club competition record ==
As of July 29, 2021

Competition	Pld	W	D	L	GF	GA	GD
UEFA Champions League	24	5	7	12	20	34	–14
UEFA Cup & UEFA Europa League	41	13	11	17	50	62	–12
UEFA Europa Conference League	4	2	0	2	4	7	–3
UEFA Intertoto Cup	4	1	1	2	6	7	–1
Total	73	21	19	33	80	110	–30

=== Matches ===
Season	Competition	Round	Opponents	1st leg	2nd leg	Aggregate
1990–1991	UEFA Cup	1R	(Scotland) Dundee United	1–3	2–2	3–5
1994–1995	UEFA Cup	PR	(Northern Ireland) Linfield	1–0	1–3	2–3
1995–1996	UEFA Cup	PR	(Northern Ireland) Glenavon	0–0	0–1	0–1
2002	UEFA Intertoto Cup	1R	(North Macedonia) Cementarnica 55	3–1	1–2	4–3
2002	UEFA Intertoto Cup	2R	(Spain) Villarreal	0–2	2–2	2–4
2004–05	UEFA Cup	1Q	(Wales) Haverfordwest County	1–0	3–1	4–1
2004–05	UEFA Cup	2Q	(Scotland) Dunfermline Athletic	2–2	2–1	4–3
2004–05	UEFA Cup	1R	(Germany) Alemannia Aachen	1–5	0–0	1–5
2005–06	UEFA Champions League	1Q	(Azerbaijan) Neftchi Baku	0–2	1–2	1–4
2006–07	UEFA Champions League	1Q	(Estonia) FC TVMK	3–2	1–1	4–3
2006–07	UEFA Champions League	2Q	(Poland) Legia Warsaw	0–1	0–2	0–3
2007–08	UEFA Champions League	1Q	(Faroe Islands) HB	4–1	0–0	4–1
2007–08	UEFA Champions League	2Q	(Belarus) BATE	1–3	1–1	2–4
2008–09	UEFA Cup	1Q	(Luxembourg) Grevenmacher	3–2	5–1	8–3
2008–09	UEFA Cup	2Q	(England) Aston Villa	1–4	1–1	2–5
2009–10	UEFA Champions League	2Q	(Kazakhstan) Aktobe	0–4	0–2	0–6
2010–11	UEFA Champions League	2Q	(Belarus) BATE	1–5	0–1	1–6
2011–12	UEFA Europa League	2Q	(Portugal) Nacional	1–1	0–2	1–3
2012–13	UEFA Europa League	1Q	(Liechtenstein) USV Eschen/Mauren	2–1	1–0	3–1
2012–13	UEFA Europa League	2Q	(Sweden) AIK	1–1	0–1	1–2
2013–14	UEFA Champions League	2Q	(Lithuania) Ekranas	1–0	2–1	3–1
2013–14	UEFA Champions League	3Q	Austria Wien	0–1	0–0	0–1
2013–14	UEFA Europa League	PO	(Belgium) Genk	0–2	2–5	2–7
2014–15	UEFA Europa League	1Q	(Northern Ireland) Glenavon	3–0	3–2	6–2
2014–15	UEFA Europa League	2Q	(Belarus) Neman Grodno	1–1	2–0	3–1
2014–15	UEFA Europa League	3Q	(Sweden) Elfsborg	1–4	2–1	3–5
2015–16	UEFA Europa League	1Q	(Finland) SJK	1–0	1–0	2–0
2015–16	UEFA Europa League	2Q	(Azerbaijan) Inter Baku	1–2	2–2	3–4 (a.e.t)
2016–17	UEFA Champions League	2Q	(Republic of Ireland) Dundalk	2–2	1–1	3–3 (a)
2017–18	UEFA Champions League	2Q	(Faroe Islands) Víkingur Gøta	1–1	2–0	3–1
2017–18	UEFA Champions League	3Q	(Slovenia) Maribor	0–1	0–1	0–2
2017–18	UEFA Europa League	PO	(Portugal) Braga	1–2	2–3	3–5
2018–19	UEFA Europa League	1Q	(Finland) Lahti	3–0	0–0	3–0
2018–19	UEFA Europa League	2Q	(Israel) Hapoel Haifa	1–1	0–1	1–2
2020–21	UEFA Europa League	1Q	(Slovakia) DAC Dunajská Streda	0−2	—N/a	—N/a
2021–22	UEFA Europa Conference League	1Q	(Republic of Ireland) Sligo Rovers	1–0	2–1	3–1
2021–22	UEFA Europa Conference League	2Q	(Norway) Rosenborg	0–2	1–4	1–6

Notes

- PR: Preliminary Round
- 1R: First round
- 1Q: First qualifying round
- 2Q: Second qualifying round
- 3Q: Third qualifying round
- PO: Play-off round

== Managers ==
- (Scotland) William Hodgson (1975–76?)
- (Iceland) Ingi Björn Albertsson (1985–1986)
- (Scotland) Ian Fleming (1987)
- (Iceland) Ólafur Jóhannesson (1988 – 1990)
- (Iceland) Ólafur Jóhannesson (1995)
- (Iceland) Ingi Björn Albertsson (1995–1996)
- (Iceland) Pétur Ormslev (1997–1998)
- (Iceland) Magnús Pálsson (1999)
- (Iceland) Logi Ólafsson (2000–2001)
- (Iceland) Sigurður Jónsson (2002)
- (Iceland) Ólafur Jóhannesson (Jan 1, 2003 – Oct 28, 2007)
- (Iceland) Heimir Guðjónsson (Jan 1, 2008 – Oct 6, 2017)
- (Iceland) Ólafur Kristjánsson (Oct 14, 2017 – July 16, 2020)
- (Iceland) Eiður Smári Guðjohnsen and Logi Ólafsson (July 16, 2020 – 2021)
- (Iceland) Ólafur Jóhannesson (2021 – 2022)
- (Iceland) Heimir Guðjónsson (2022 – 2025)
- (Iceland) Jóhannes Karl Guðjónsson (2025 – present)

== Players ==
=== Current squad ===
As of 15 August 2026

Note: Flags indicate national team as defined under FIFA eligibility rules; some limited exceptions apply. Players may hold more than one non-FIFA nationality.

No.	Pos.	Nation	Player
1	GK	ISL	Jökull Andrésson
2	DF	ISL	Birkir Valur Jónsson
3	DF	ISL	Kristján Snær Frostason
4	DF	SWE	Tobias Carlsson
5	DF	ISL	Oliver Stefánsson
6	DF	ISL	Grétar Snær Gunnarsson
7	MF	ISL	Kjartan Kári Halldórsson
9	FW	ISL	Kristján Flóki Finnbogason
10	FW	ISL	Sverrir Páll Hjaltested
11	FW	ISL	Guðmundur Andri Tryggvason
14	FW	ISL	Adolf Birgisson
17	MF	ISL	Jóhannes Bjarnason (on loan from Víkingur)
18	MF	ISL	Erlingur Agnarsson
19	DF	ISL	Aron Jónsson

No.	Pos.	Nation	Player
22	DF	ISL	Ísak Óli Ólafsson
23	MF	ISL	Tómas Orri Róbertsson
24	GK	ISL	Daði Freyr Arnarsson
31	DF	ISL	Ketill Ketilsson
32	FW	ISL	Gils Gíslason
33	FW	ISL	Úlfur Agúst Björnsson
34	DF	ISL	Óttar Uni Steinbjörnsson
35	MF	ISL	Allan Purisevic
37	MF	ISL	Baldur Kári Helgason
38	DF	ISL	Arngrímur Bjartur Guðmundsson
40	MF	ISL	Robert Sævarsson
41	FW	ISL	Asgeir Steinarsson
45	FW	DEN	Bastian Andersen
90	FW	ISL	Arnór Borg Guðjohnsen

=== Out on loan ===
Note: Flags indicate national team as defined under FIFA eligibility rules; some limited exceptions apply. Players may hold more than one non-FIFA nationality.

No.	Pos.	Nation	Player
16	MF	ISL	Bjarni Guðjón Brynjólfsson (at Þór until 31 January 2027)
27	DF	ISL	Jóhann Ægir Arnarsson (at Njarðvík until 31 January 2027)

No.	Pos.	Nation	Player
66	MF	ISL	Viktor Vidarsson (at Njarðvík until 31 January 2027)
—	FW	ISL	Ísak Atli Atlason (at ÍR until 31 January 2027)
