= Daníel Guðjohnsen =

Icelandic footballer (born 2006)

Personal information
- Full name: Daníel Tristan Guðjohnsen
- Date of birth: 1 March 2006 (age 20)
- Place of birth: London, England
- Height: 1.90 m (6 ft 3 in)
- Position: Forward

Team information
- Current team: Malmö FF
- Number: 32

Youth career
- 2011–2015: CF Gavà
- 2015–2019: Barcelona
- 2019–2022: Real Madrid
- 2022–2023: Malmö FF

Senior career*
Years	Team	Apps	(Gls)
2023–	Malmö FF	38	(5)

International career^{‡}
2022	Iceland U16	2	(0)
2021–2023	Iceland U17	13	(5)
2022–2025	Iceland U19	10	(2)
2026–	Iceland U21	5	(7)
2025–	Iceland	6	(0)
- * Club domestic league appearances and goals as of 19 September 2026 ‡ National team caps and goals as of 9 October 2026

Daníel Tristan Guðjohnsen (born 1 March 2006) is an Icelandic professional footballer who plays as a forward for Allsvenskan club Malmö FF and the Iceland national team.

On 11 October 2023, he was named by English newspaper The Guardian as one of the best players born in 2006 worldwide.

== Early life and career ==
Daníel was born in London, but grew up in Spain. He began his career at local team CF Gavà, before moving to the academy of FC Barcelona at the age of nine. He developed in La Masia for four years, but when his family decided to move to the city of Madrid, Daníel joined the academy of Real Madrid.

== Club career ==
In August 2022, he signed with Allsvenskan club Malmö FF, starting up with their under-19s. In February 2023, he was selected to the senior squad of Malmö FF ahead of their pre-season friendlies against Vålerenga and AGF. In April 2023, he was officially signed as part of the first team. Two months later, on 5 June 2023, he made his professional, and Allsvenskan, debut as a late substitute in a 5–0 thrashing of Degerfors IF at Eleda Stadion. For the next 18 months, he struggled with healing a back injury, and only returned to the first team match squad in November 2024. On 1 December 2024, Daníel scored a hat-trick in a 5–2 win over Torslanda IK in the second round of the Svenska Cupen.

In the 2025 season, Daníel became a regular in the first team, and he scored his first Allsvenskan goal on 15 May 2025 against IFK Värnamo. Following the departure of striker Isaac Kiese Thelin in the summer transfer window, Daníel's playing time further increased, as the club decided against signing a replacement for Kiese Thelin. After an impressive period in the fall, he ended the 2025 Allsvenskan as Malmö FF's top point scorer (with 12), having delivered 5 goals and 7 assists in 23 league appearances.

== International career ==
Daníel has played for the Iceland youth teams since 2021. On 25 October 2022, he scored two goals in Iceland U17 3–0 win against North Macedonia U17.

On 9 September 2025, Daníel made his senior Iceland international debut starting as one of two strikers, alongside his brother Andri Guðjohnsen, in a 1–2 loss against France at Parc des Princes. In June 2026, following an Iceland–Argentina friendly ahead of the 2026 FIFA World Cup, Daníel went viral when he surprised Lionel Messi with the fact that his father Eiður and Messi used to be teammates at FC Barcelona.

== Personal life ==
Daníel is the youngest son of former footballer Eiður Guðjohnsen and brother of Sveinn Aron Guðjohnsen and Andri Guðjohnsen. His grandfather is former Icelandic international Arnór Guðjohnsen. His half-uncle, also called Arnór Guðjohnsen, is also a professional footballer.

== Career statistics ==
=== Club ===
As of match played 19 September 2026

Appearances and goals by club, season and competition
Club	Season	League			Svenska Cupen		Europe		Total	
Club	Season	Division	Apps	Goals	Apps	Goals	Apps	Goals	Apps	Goals
Malmö	2023	Allsvenskan	1	0	0	0	0	0	1	0
Malmö	2024	Allsvenskan	1	0	1	3	1 (Note: Appearance in UEFA Europa League)	0	3	3
Malmö	2025	Allsvenskan	23	5	2	0	9 (Note: Three appearances in UEFA Champions League, six appearances and one goal in UEFA Europa League)	1	34	6
Malmö	2026	Allsvenskan	13	0	3	0	2 (Note: Appearances in UEFA Europa League)	0	18	0
Career total			38	5	6	3	12	1	56	9

=== International ===
As of match played 9 June 2026

Appearances and goals by national team and year
National team	Year	Apps	Goals
Iceland	2025	5	0
Iceland	2026	1	0
Total		6	0

== Honours ==
Malmö FF

- Allsvenskan: 2023, 2024
