= Eiður Guðjohnsen =

Icelandic footballer

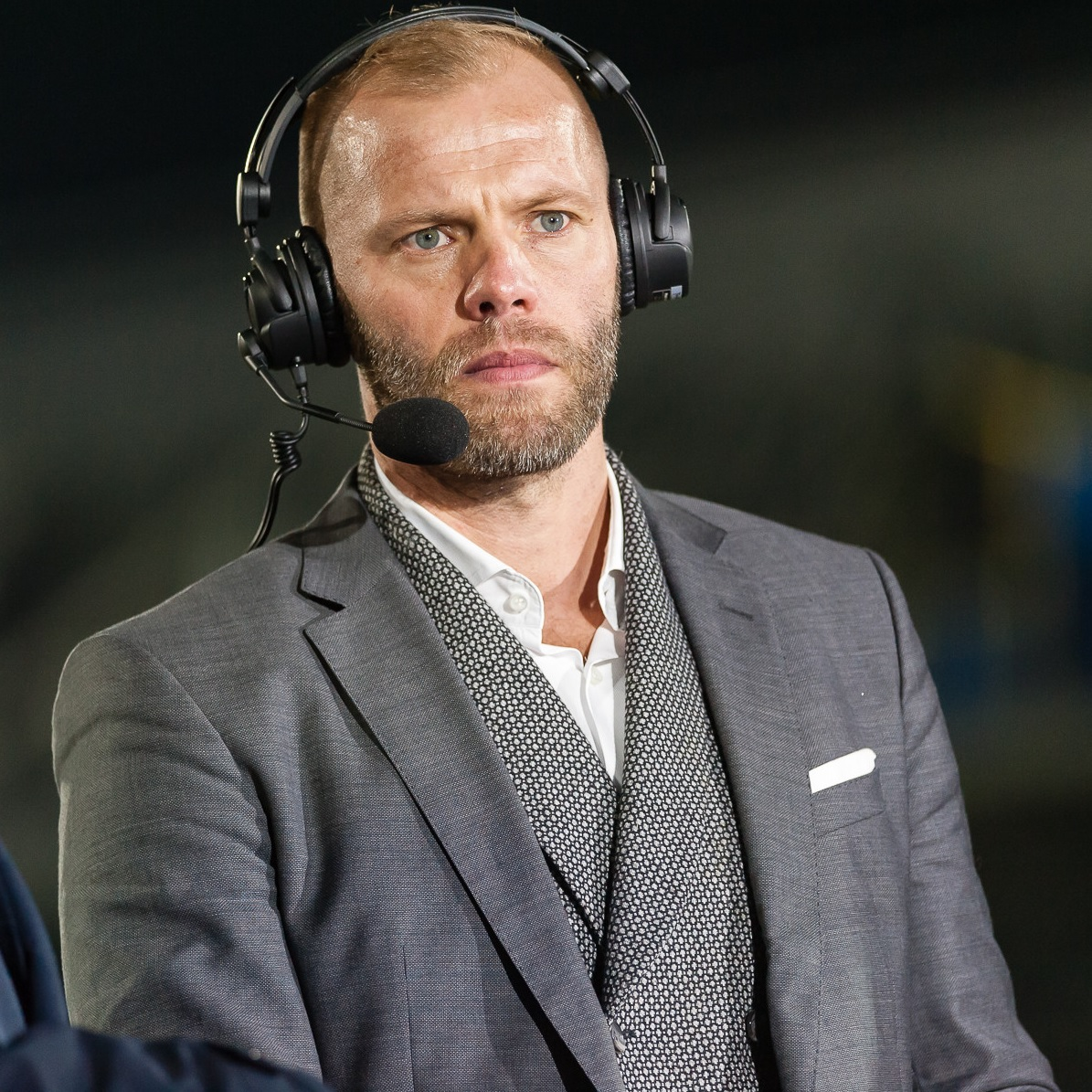
- Eiður Smári in 2018

Personal information
- Full name: Eiður Smári Guðjohnsen
- Date of birth: 15 September 1978 (age 48)
- Place of birth: Reykjavík, Iceland
- Height: 6 ft 1 in (1.85 m)
- Positions: Forward; midfielder

Senior career*
| Years | Team | Apps | (Gls) |
| 1994 | Valur | 17 | (7) |
| 1995–1998 | PSV | 13 | (3) |
| 1998 | KR Reykjavík | 6 | (0) |
| 1998–2000 | Bolton Wanderers | 55 | (18) |
| 2000–2006 | Chelsea | 186 | (54) |
| 2006–2009 | Barcelona | 72 | (10) |
| 2009–2010 | Monaco | 9 | (0) |
| 2010 | → Tottenham Hotspur (loan) | 11 | (1) |
| 2010–2011 | Stoke City | 4 | (0) |
| 2011 | → Fulham (loan) | 10 | (0) |
| 2011–2012 | AEK Athens | 10 | (1) |
| 2012–2013 | Cercle Brugge | 13 | (6) |
| 2013–2014 | Club Brugge | 46 | (7) |
| 2014–2015 | Bolton Wanderers | 21 | (5) |
| 2015–2016 | Shijiazhuang Ever Bright | 14 | (1) |
| 2016 | Molde | 13 | (1) |
| 2016 | Pune City | 0 | (0) |
| Total | | 500 | (114) |

International career
| 1992–1994 | Iceland U17 | 27 | (6) |
| 1994 | Iceland U19 | 9 | (2) |
| 1994–1998 | Iceland U21 | 11 | (5) |
| 1996–2016 | Iceland | 88 | (26) |

Managerial career
- 2020: FH
- 2022: FH
- 2026-: KA
- * Club domestic league appearances and goals

Eiður Smári Guðjohnsen (transliterated as Eidur Smari Gudjohnsen; born 15 September 1978) is an Icelandic professional football coach and former player who played as a forward. Eiður saw his greatest success in England and Spain with Chelsea and Barcelona respectively, where he won the UEFA Champions League and La Liga with the latter and the League Cup and Premiership twice with the former. Along with two spells at Bolton Wanderers fourteen years apart, he also played in Iceland, the Netherlands, France, Greece, Belgium, China, Norway and India in a club career lasting 23 years. He is regarded as the greatest Icelandic footballer of all time.

Eiður is the son of Arnór Guðjohnsen, who was also an Icelandic international footballer. He made his full international debut for Iceland as a substitute for his father in 1996, scoring 26 international goals in 88 caps between 1996 and 2016. He was the captain of the Iceland national team until Ólafur Jóhannesson took over the role of manager. He was part of their squad that reached the quarter-finals of UEFA Euro 2016, their first major tournament.

== Club career ==
=== Early career ===
After spending the 1994 season with Valur in Reykjavík, Eiður played for PSV in the Netherlands from 1995, playing alongside Ronaldo. Following a serious ankle injury, he returned home to play for KR Reykjavík.

=== Bolton Wanderers ===
Eiður signed with English club Bolton Wanderers in 1998. He made his debut in September 1998 in a match against Birmingham City. By March the following year, Eiður had become a regular member of the Bolton first team, and the following season, he scored 21 times in all competitions as the Trotters reached the Division One play-offs and the semi-finals of both the FA Cup and the League Cup.

=== Chelsea ===
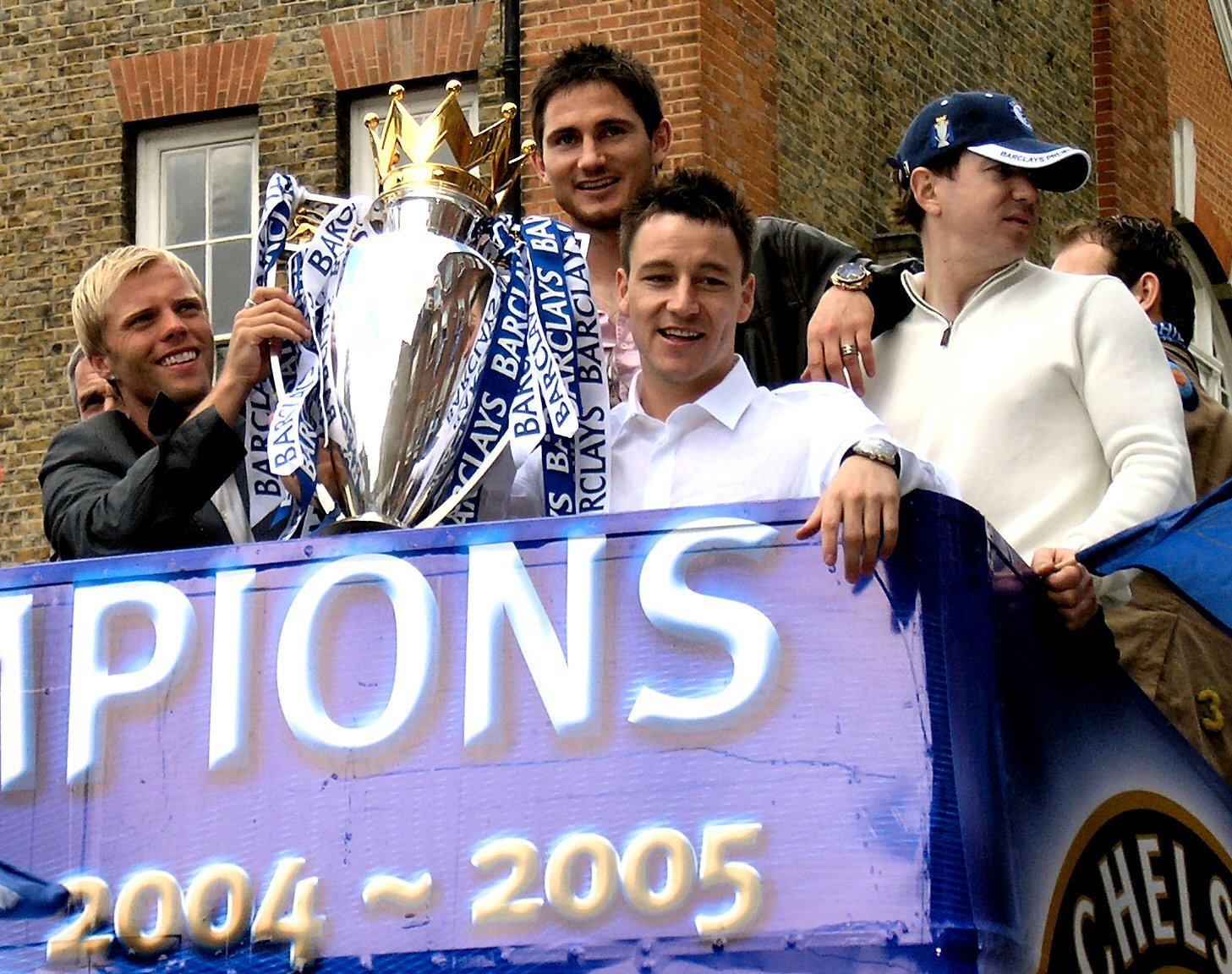
Eiður celebrates winning the 2004–05 Premiership with Frank Lampard and John Terry.

On 19 June 2000, Eiður was signed by Premier League club Chelsea for a fee of £4.5 million. He was the second striker signed by the Blues that pre-season, after Dutch international Jimmy Floyd Hasselbaink.

Eiður made his debut on 13 August in the 2000 FA Charity Shield at Wembley, replacing Gianfranco Zola for the final 17 minutes of a 2–0 win over Manchester United. He spent most of his first season in London being used as a substitute, but was still able to score 13 times. In his second season, he formed a partnership with Hasselbaink which provided 52 goals for Chelsea in all competitions.

Following the appointment of José Mourinho as manager, Eiður eventually played in a more withdrawn role as he helped the club win two successive Premier League titles. On 23 October 2004, he scored a hat-trick in a 4–0 home win over Blackburn Rovers.

=== Barcelona ===
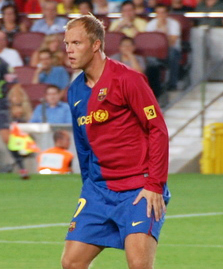
Eiður playing for Barcelona in 2008

On 14 June 2006, Eiður was signed by La Liga club Barcelona in an £8 million transfer on a four-year contract, as a replacement for Henrik Larsson.

He made his debut on 20 August in the second leg of the 2006 Supercopa de España, as a half-time substitute in a 3–0 win at the Camp Nou against Espanyol (4–0 aggregate). Eight days later in his league debut away to Celta Vigo, he replaced Ludovic Giuly with 16 minutes remaining and scored the winning goal in a 3–2 victory.

He was part of the Treble-winning side in 2008–09 as Barcelona won La Liga, the Copa del Rey and the UEFA Champions League.

=== Monaco and return to England ===
Eiður joined Ligue 1 club Monaco, on 31 August 2009, signing a two-year deal for a £1.8 million fee.

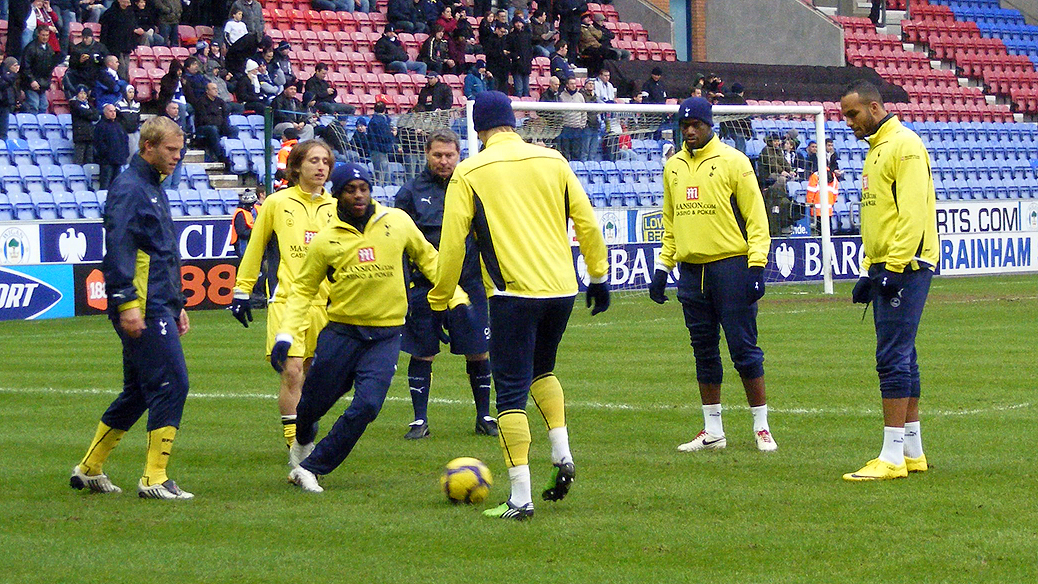
Gudjohnsen (furthest left) warming up for Tottenham before an away match at Wigan Athletic, 21 February 2010

On 28 January 2010, Tottenham Hotspur manager Harry Redknapp confirmed that Eiður had joined the club on loan for the remainder of the 2009–10 season, despite undergoing a medical at West Ham United. The striker was offered identical deals by both clubs; however, Eiður opted to join Spurs. On 31 August 2010, Eiður signed for Stoke City on a one-year deal and made his debut for Stoke on 18 September in a 1–1 draw against West Ham. After only making five substitute appearances for Stoke, Eiður left on the final day of the January transfer window to join Fulham on loan. On 31 January 2011, Eiður signed on loan to Fulham until the end of the 2010–11 season. After an unsuccessful time at Stoke, he was released at the end of the 2010–11 season.

=== AEK Athens ===
On 19 July 2011, Eiður signed a two-year deal with Greek club AEK Athens, keeping him at the club until 2013, despite further interest from English club West Ham as well as Welsh side Swansea City. He was greeted by over 2,500 AEK fans at Athens International Airport.

Shortly after signing a new two-year contract with AEK, Eiður stated to the press after he was greeted by the AEK fans: "It was unbelievable, I have played and been in many countries but I have never seen anything like this before. It really made me feel welcomed. I was informed that I would have been greeted but this was not what I had in mind. I am a 100% sure I have made the right choice going to AEK. I have come for trophies and nothing else. The least thing I can do is help AEK achieve their expectations after the way I was greeted at the airport."

On 15 October 2011, in the derby match against Olympiakos, Eiður was injured in the 44th minute following a collision with opposition goalkeeper Franco Costanzo. The diagnosis was a fractured tibia and fibula which kept him out for the remainder of the season.

=== Move to Belgium ===
Eiður traveled to the United States in September 2012 for a trial with Major League Soccer club Seattle Sounders. He played one match for their reserve team against Chivas USA's reserves and scored a goal.

On 2 October 2012, Eiður joined Belgian side Cercle Brugge of the Pro League, signing a contract until the end of the season. On 13 January 2013, after an impressive first half of the season with Cercle Brugge, Eiður signed a one-and-a-half-year contract with city rivals Club Brugge for an estimated amount of €300,000.

=== Return to Bolton ===
After leaving Club Brugge at the end of his contract, Eiður began training with former club Bolton Wanderers in November 2014. On 5 December, he signed for Bolton for the remainder of the 2014–15 season.

He made his second debut for the club as a second-half substitute for Darren Pratley in a goalless draw with Ipswich Town at the Macron Stadium on 13 December, the same opponents against whom Eiður had made the last appearance of his previous Bolton spell against in May 2000.

On 4 April 2015, Bolton manager Neil Lennon said that the week had been one of the best of Eiður's career, as he had returned and scored for Iceland after two years without a cap and six years without an international goal, equalised in stoppage time for Bolton against Blackpool and became a father for the fourth time in that week.

=== Later career ===
Eiður joined Chinese Super League club Shijiazhuang Ever Bright in July 2015 on an undisclosed contract. In February the following year he signed for Norwegian Tippeligaen side Molde on a two-year contract. He was released from his contract with Molde in August 2016, In 2016, he signed for Indian Super League outfit Pune City as a marquee foreigner but, after the sudden injury, he was ruled out of the entire season. In September 2017, he retired from professional football.

== International career ==
Eiður made his debut for the Iceland under-17 national team in 1992 at the age of 14. He went on to score seven goals in 26 appearances for the team before progressing to the under-19 side in 1994. He netted twice in nine caps for the under-19s, before making his debut for the U-21 side later in the year. He represented the U-21s for four years, scoring a total of four goals in 11 caps.

On 24 April 1996, 17-year-old Eiður and his 34-year-old father Arnór entered football history when playing in an international friendly for the senior Iceland team against Estonia in Tallinn. Arnór started the match, and Eiður came on in the second half as a substitute for his father. Both father and son have later expressed bitterness at the fact that they were not allowed to play together in that match. The then president of the Football Association of Iceland, Eggert Magnússon, gave the coach Logi Ólafsson an express order to not play them together because he wanted it to occur on home turf, when Iceland played Macedonia two months later in the first qualification round for the 1998 FIFA World Cup. As it happened, however, the two never got another chance because a month after the match in Estonia Eiður broke his leg playing for the Icelandic U-18 team against the Republic of Ireland. He had difficulty coming back because of undiagnosed tendinitis in that leg. When he had recovered and was again available for selection for the national team, his father had retired.

On 2 September 2006, Eiður scored in a 3–0 away victory over Northern Ireland in UEFA Euro 2008 qualifying, pulling him level with Ríkharður Jónsson's record of 17 international goals (the latter had held the record since his third goal in 1948, and totalled 17 in 33 matches from 1947 to 1965). On 13 October 2007, his 48th cap, Eiður broke a six-match international drought with two goals in a 2–4 home qualifier defeat to Latvia to become Iceland's top scorer of all time. He said that the record was made less important by the day's defeat.

Eiður announced his possible retirement from international football after Iceland's 2–0 defeat against Croatia on 19 November 2013 in a play-off for a place at the 2014 World Cup.

On 28 March 2015, he made a goal-scoring return to the national team after 18 months away, opening a 3–0 win over Kazakhstan at the Astana Arena in Euro 2016 qualifying.

He was selected for Iceland's Euro 2016 squad at the age of 37. He appeared twice, both as a substitute. He came on late in their second group match against Hungary which ended 1–1. Iceland then surprised everyone by progressing into the last 16, where they caused another shock after defeating England 2–1. He came on and was given the captain's armband in the 82nd minute in their quarter-final match against tournament hosts France. They lost 5–2 and were eliminated, which was his last international match.

== Style of play ==
Guðjohnsen was known for possessing a good touch, link-up play, and composure in front of goal, which made him capable of both creating and scoring goals. His qualities as an assist-provider once led his Chelsea manager José Mourinho to dub him "the blond Maradona."

== Personal life ==
In September 2001, Eiður, Chelsea teammates John Terry, Frank Lampard and Jody Morris, and Leicester City's Frank Sinclair, were drunk and unruly in a Heathrow Airport hotel containing many Americans left stranded by the September 11 attacks. The Chelsea quartet were each fined two weeks' wages, totalling around £100,000, which was donated to the 9/11 relief efforts. In January 2003, Eiður admitted to a gambling problem, confessing to having lost £400,000 in casinos over a five-month period.

Eiður's half-brother, named Arnór like their father, signed for Swansea City in July 2017, at the age of 16. Eiður has one daughter and three sons. All of his sons are professional footballers and Iceland internationals: Sveinn Aron Guðjohnsen (born 1998), Andri Guðjohnsen (born 2002), and Daníel Guðjohnsen (born 2006).

== Coaching career ==
In January 2019, Eiður was hired as the assistant manager for the Iceland national under-21 football team under newly appointed manager Arnar Viðarsson.

On 16 July 2020, Eiður took over as manager of FH, along with Logi Ólafsson.

After initially signing a contract extension with FH for the 2021 season, Eiður left the team in December 2020, and took over as an assistant manager of the Iceland men's national team.

== Career statistics ==
=== Club ===
Appearances and goals by club, season and competition
| Club | Season | League | | | National cup (Note: Includes FA Cup, Copa del Rey, Coupe de France, Belgian Cup) | | League cup (Note: Includes Football League Cup, Coupe de la Ligue) | | Continental | | Other | | Total | |
| Club | Season | Division | Apps | Goals | Apps | Goals | Apps | Goals | Apps | Goals | Apps | Goals | Apps | Goals |
|---|---|---|---|---|---|---|---|---|---|---|---|---|---|---|
| Valur | 1994 | Úrvalsdeild | 17 | 7 | | | — | | — | | — | | 17 | 7 |
| PSV | 1995–96 | Eredivisie | 13 | 3 | | | — | | 2 (Note: Appearances in UEFA Cup) | 0 | — | | 15 | 3 |
| PSV | 1996–97 | Eredivisie | 0 | 0 | 0 | 0 | — | | 0 | 0 | — | | 0 | 0 |
| PSV | Total | | 13 | 3 | | | — | | 2 | 0 | — | | 15 | 3 |
| KR | 1998 | Úrvalsdeild | 6 | 0 | | | | | — | | — | | 6 | 0 |
| Bolton Wanderers | 1998–99 | First Division | 14 | 5 | 0 | 0 | 1 | 0 | — | | 3 (Note: Appearances in Football League play-offs) | 0 | 18 | 5 |
| Bolton Wanderers | 1999–2000 | First Division | 41 | 13 | 5 | 4 | 8 | 3 | — | | 1 | 1 | 55 | 21 |
| Bolton Wanderers | Total | | 55 | 18 | 5 | 4 | 9 | 3 | — | | 4 | 1 | 73 | 26 |
| Chelsea | 2000–01 | Premier League | 30 | 10 | 3 | 3 | 1 | 0 | 2 | 0 | 1 (Note: Appearance in FA Community Shield) | 0 | 37 | 13 |
| Chelsea | 2001–02 | Premier League | 32 | 14 | 7 | 3 | 5 | 3 | 3 | 3 | — | | 47 | 23 |
| Chelsea | 2002–03 | Premier League | 35 | 10 | 5 | 0 | 2 | 0 | 2 | 0 | — | | 44 | 10 |
| Chelsea | 2003–04 | Premier League | 26 | 6 | 4 | 2 | 1 | 2 | 10 (Note: Appearances in UEFA Champions League) | 3 | — | | 41 | 13 |
| Chelsea | 2004–05 | Premier League | 37 | 12 | 3 | 1 | 6 | 1 | 11 | 2 | — | | 57 | 16 |
| Chelsea | 2005–06 | Premier League | 26 | 2 | 3 | 1 | 1 | 0 | 6 | 0 | 1 | 0 | 37 | 3 |
| Chelsea | Total | | 186 | 54 | 25 | 10 | 16 | 6 | 34 | 8 | 2 | 0 | 263 | 78 |
| Barcelona | 2006–07 | La Liga | 25 | 5 | 6 | 3 | — | | 8 | 3 | 4 (Note: One appearance in UEFA Super Cup, one appearance in Supercopa de España, two appearances and one goal in FIFA Club World Cup) | 1 | 43 | 12 |
| Barcelona | 2007–08 | La Liga | 23 | 2 | 6 | 1 | — | | 8 | 0 | — | | 37 | 3 |
| Barcelona | 2008–09 | La Liga | 24 | 3 | 5 | 1 | — | | 5 | 0 | — | | 34 | 4 |
| Barcelona | 2009–10 | La Liga | 0 | 0 | 0 | 0 | — | | 0 | 0 | 0 | 0 | 0 | 0 |
| Barcelona | Total | | 72 | 10 | 17 | 5 | — | | 21 | 3 | 4 | 1 | 114 | 19 |
| Monaco | 2009–10 | Ligue 1 | 9 | 0 | 1 | 0 | 1 | 0 | — | | — | | 11 | 0 |
| Tottenham Hotspur | 2009–10 | Premier League | 11 | 1 | 3 | 1 | 0 | 0 | — | | — | | 14 | 2 |
| Stoke City | 2010–11 | Premier League | 4 | 0 | 0 | 0 | 1 | 0 | — | | — | | 5 | 0 |
| Fulham | 2010–11 | Premier League | 10 | 0 | 0 | 0 | 0 | 0 | — | | — | | 10 | 0 |
| AEK Athens | 2011–12 | Super League Greece | 10 | 1 | 0 | 0 | — | | 4 (Note: Appearances in UEFA Europa League) | 0 | — | | 14 | 1 |
| Cercle Brugge | 2012–13 | Belgian Pro League | 13 | 6 | 1 | 1 | — | | — | | — | | 14 | 7 |
| Club Brugge | 2012–13 | Belgian Pro League | 18 | 3 | 0 | 0 | — | | 0 | 0 | — | | 18 | 3 |
| Club Brugge | 2013–14 | Belgian Pro League | 28 | 4 | 1 | 0 | — | | 2 | 0 | — | | 31 | 4 |
| Club Brugge | Total | | 46 | 7 | 1 | 0 | — | | 2 | 0 | — | | 49 | 7 |
| Bolton Wanderers | 2014–15 | Championship | 21 | 5 | 3 | 1 | 0 | 0 | — | | — | | 24 | 6 |
| Shijiazhuang Ever Bright | 2015 | Chinese Super League | 14 | 1 | 0 | 0 | — | | — | | — | | 14 | 1 |
| Molde | 2016 | Tippeligaen | 13 | 1 | 0 | 0 | — | | — | | — | | 13 | 1 |
| Pune City | 2016 | Indian Super League | 0 | 0 | — | | — | | — | | — | | 0 | 0 |
| Career total | | | 500 | 114 | 56 | 22 | 27 | 9 | 63 | 11 | 10 | 2 | 656 | 158 |

=== International ===
Appearances and goals by national team and year
| National team | Year | Apps | Goals |
|---|---|---|---|
| Iceland | 1996 | 1 | 0 |
| Iceland | 1997 | 0 | 0 |
| Iceland | 1998 | 0 | 0 |
| Iceland | 1999 | 3 | 1 |
| Iceland | 2000 | 5 | 0 |
| Iceland | 2001 | 7 | 2 |
| Iceland | 2002 | 4 | 3 |
| Iceland | 2003 | 7 | 3 |
| Iceland | 2004 | 7 | 4 |
| Iceland | 2005 | 5 | 3 |
| Iceland | 2006 | 5 | 1 |
| Iceland | 2007 | 5 | 2 |
| Iceland | 2008 | 6 | 3 |
| Iceland | 2009 | 6 | 2 |
| Iceland | 2010 | 2 | 0 |
| Iceland | 2011 | 4 | 0 |
| Iceland | 2012 | 1 | 0 |
| Iceland | 2013 | 10 | 0 |
| Iceland | 2014 | 0 | 0 |
| Iceland | 2015 | 3 | 1 |
| Iceland | 2016 | 7 | 1 |
| Total | | 88 | 26 |

Scores and results list Iceland's goal tally first, score column indicates score after each Guðjohnsen goal.

List of international goals scored by Eiður Guðjohnsen
| No. | Date | Venue | Opponent | Score | Result | Competition |
|---|---|---|---|---|---|---|
| 1 | 4 September 1999 | Laugardalsvöllur, Reykjavík, Iceland | Andorra | 3–0 | 3–0 | UEFA Euro 2000 qualification |
| 2 | 25 April 2001 | Ta' Qali National Stadium, Ta' Qali, Malta | Malta | 3–1 | 4–1 | 2002 FIFA World Cup qualification |
| 3 | 2 June 2001 | Laugardalsvöllur, Reykjavík, Iceland | Malta | 3–0 | 3–0 | 2002 FIFA World Cup qualification |
| 4 | 21 August 2002 | Laugardalsvöllur, Reykjavík, Iceland | Andorra | 1–0 | 3–0 | Friendly |
| 5 | 16 October 2002 | Laugardalsvöllur, Reykjavík, Iceland | Lithuania | 2–0 | 3–0 | UEFA Euro 2004 qualification |
| 6 | 16 October 2002 | Laugardalsvöllur, Reykjavík, Iceland | Lithuania | 3–0 | 3–0 | UEFA Euro 2004 qualification |
| 7 | 29 March 2003 | Hampden Park, Glasgow, Scotland | Scotland | 1–1 | 1–2 | UEFA Euro 2004 qualification |
| 8 | 11 June 2003 | Darius and Girėnas Stadium, Kaunas, Lithuania | Lithuania | 2–0 | 3–0 | UEFA Euro 2004 qualification |
| 9 | 20 August 2003 | Tórsvøllur, Tórshavn, Faroe Islands | Faroe Islands | 1–0 | 2–1 | UEFA Euro 2004 qualification |
| 10 | 18 August 2004 | Laugardalsvöllur, Reykjavík, Iceland | Italy | 1–0 | 2–0 | Friendly |
| 11 | 4 September 2004 | Laugardalsvöllur, Reykjavík, Iceland | Bulgaria | 1–2 | 1–3 | 2006 FIFA World Cup qualification |
| 12 | 8 September 2004 | Ferenc Szusza Stadium, Budapest, Hungary | Hungary | 1–0 | 2–3 | 2006 FIFA World Cup qualification |
| 13 | 13 October 2004 | Laugardalsvöllur, Reykjavík, Iceland | Sweden | 1–4 | 1–4 | 2006 FIFA World Cup qualification |
| 14 | 4 June 2005 | Laugardalsvöllur, Reykjavík, Iceland | Hungary | 1–0 | 2–3 | 2006 FIFA World Cup qualification |
| 15 | 8 June 2005 | Laugardalsvöllur, Reykjavík, Iceland | Malta | 2–0 | 4–1 | 2006 FIFA World Cup qualification |
| 16 | 3 September 2005 | Laugardalsvöllur, Reykjavík, Iceland | Croatia | 1–0 | 1–3 | 2006 FIFA World Cup qualification |
| 17 | 2 September 2006 | Windsor Park, Belfast, Northern Ireland | Northern Ireland | 3–0 | 3–0 | UEFA Euro 2008 qualification |
| 18 | 13 October 2007 | Laugardalsvöllur, Reykjavík, Iceland | Latvia | 1–0 | 2–4 | UEFA Euro 2008 qualification |
| 19 | 13 October 2007 | Laugardalsvöllur, Reykjavík, Iceland | Latvia | 2–4 | 2–4 | UEFA Euro 2008 qualification |
| 20 | 26 March 2008 | Tehelné pole, Bratislava, Slovakia | Slovakia | 2–0 | 2–1 | Friendly |
| 21 | 6 September 2008 | Ullevaal Stadion, Oslo, Norway | Norway | 2–2 | 2–2 | 2010 FIFA World Cup qualification |
| 22 | 10 September 2008 | Laugardalsvöllur, Reykjavík, Iceland | Scotland | 1–2 | 1–2 | 2010 FIFA World Cup qualification |
| 23 | 11 February 2009 | La Manga Stadium, La Manga, Spain | Liechtenstein | 2–0 | 2–0 | Friendly |
| 24 | 5 September 2009 | Laugardalsvöllur, Reykjavík, Iceland | Norway | 1–1 | 1–1 | 2010 FIFA World Cup qualification |
| 25 | 28 March 2015 | Astana Arena, Astana, Kazakhstan | Kazakhstan | 1–0 | 3–0 | UEFA Euro 2016 qualification |
| 26 | 6 June 2016 | Laugardalsvöllur, Reykjavík, Iceland | Liechtenstein | 4–0 | 4–0 | Friendly |

== Honours ==
Chelsea

- Premier League: 2004–05, 2005–06
- Football League Cup: 2004–05
- FA Charity/Community Shield: 2000, 2005
- FA Cup runner-up: 2001–02

Barcelona

- La Liga: 2008–09
- Copa del Rey: 2008–09
- Supercopa de España: 2006, 2009
- UEFA Champions League: 2008–09
- UEFA Super Cup: 2009
- FIFA Club World Cup runner-up: 2006

Individual

- Icelandic Footballer of the Year: 2001, 2003, 2004, 2005, 2006, 2008, 2009
