= Andri Guðjohnsen =

Icelandic footballer (born 2002)

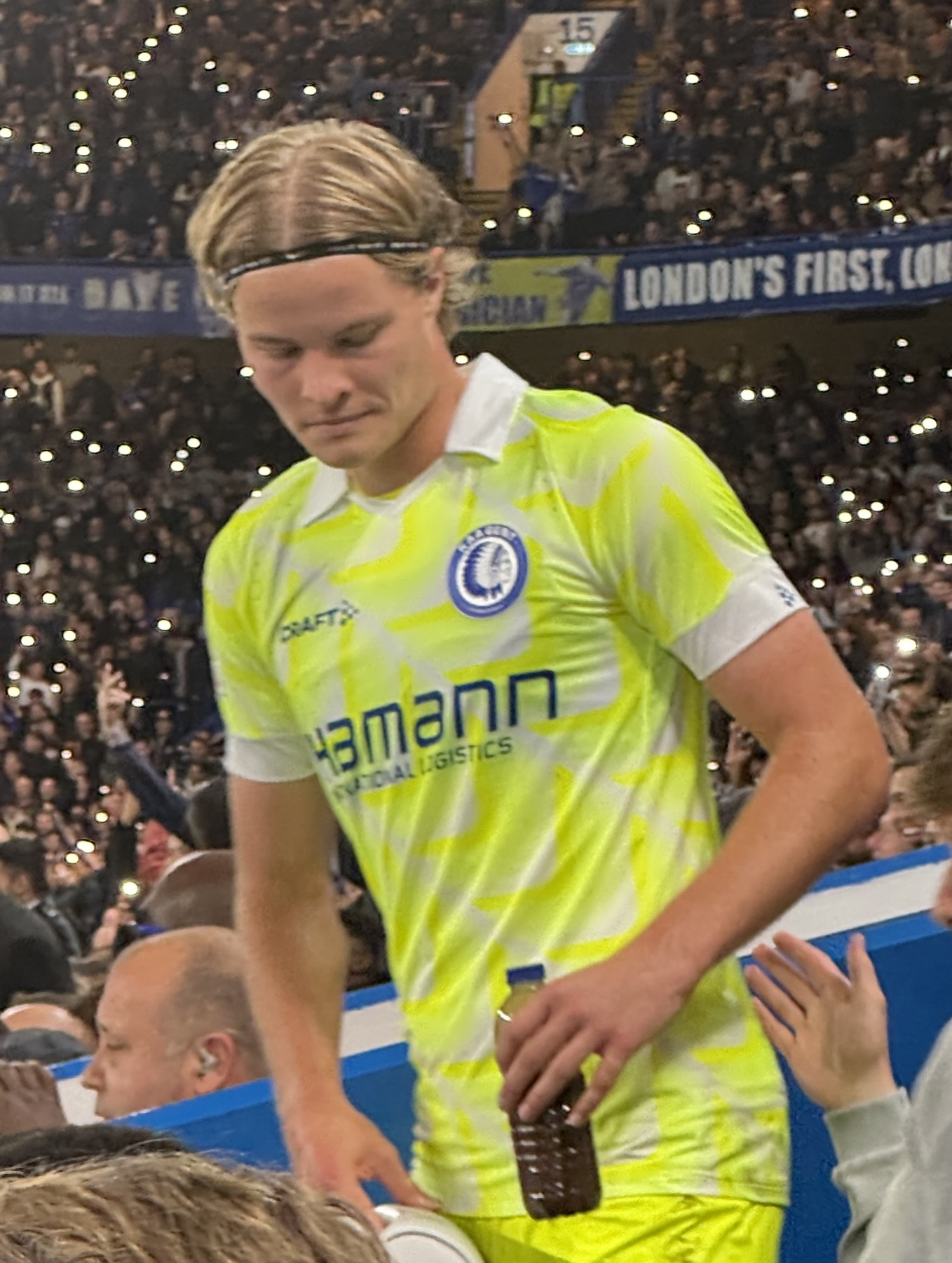
- Guðjohnsen in 2024

Personal information
- Full name: Andri Lucas Guðjohnsen
- Date of birth: 29 January 2002 (age 24)
- Place of birth: Westminster, England
- Height: 1.88 m (6 ft 2 in)
- Position: Forward

Team information
- Current team: Blackburn Rovers
- Number: 9

Youth career
- 2010–2013: Barcelona
- 2013–2015: Gavà
- 2015–2018: Espanyol
- 2018–2021: Real Madrid

Senior career*
Years	Team	Apps	(Gls)
2021–2022	Real Madrid B	21	(4)
2022–2024	IFK Norrköping	29	(1)
2023–2024	→ Lyngby (loan)	28	(13)
2024	Lyngby	0	(0)
2024–2025	Gent	34	(5)
2025–	Blackburn Rovers	39	(17)

International career^{‡}
2017	Iceland U16	7	(2)
2017–2019	Iceland U17	12	(8)
2017–2018	Iceland U18	3	(0)
2018–2019	Iceland U19	10	(4)
2023–2024	Iceland U21	3	(1)
2021–	Iceland	45	(16)
- * Club domestic league appearances and goals as of 21:09, 18 November 2026 (UTC) ‡ National team caps and goals as of 16 November 2026

Andri Lucas Guðjohnsen (Icelandic pronunciation: [antri kvuðjɔnsɛn]) (born 29 January 2002) is an Icelandic professional footballer who plays as a centre forward for EFL Championship club Blackburn Rovers and the Iceland national team.

== Early life ==
Born in London, Andri is the son of the former Bolton Wanderers, Chelsea, Tottenham Hotspur, and Barcelona footballer Eiður Guðjohnsen, the grandson of former Anderlecht star Arnór Guðjohnsen, the younger brother of Sarpsborg 08 footballer Sveinn Aron Guðjohnsen and the older brother of Malmö FF footballer Daníel Guðjohnsen.

== Club career ==
Andri Guðjohnsen started playing football in Barcelona, but after three years in La Masia, he left to play for his local club, Gavà, before joining Barcelona's rivals Espanyol in 2015.

He moved to Real Madrid, another rival of Barcelona, from Espanyol in the summer of 2018. He had scored 20 goals for Espanyol youth teams the previous season, and Real was reported to have made the youngster's signing a top priority, also including Andri's younger brother Dani in the deal. His first season in Madrid was successful, as his performances earned him a place in the U19 squad at only 16 years old, where he scored several goals, under Raúl's management. He also finished the season as the top scorer for Real Madrid Juvenil C (Under-17).

In July 2020, Andri tore an anterior cruciate ligament in his knee and was expected to miss six months. In July 2021, Andri was promoted to the Castilla side, and in September 2021, he was included in Real Madrid's Champions League squad for the first time. In the summer of 2022, Andri found himself out of favour in the Castilla side, leading him to leave and sign for IFK Norrköping.

On 18 August 2023, Andri joined Danish Superliga side Lyngby on a one-year loan deal with a purchase option. On 17 April 2024, Lyngby announced that they had redeemed the buyout clause on Andri, and he signed a three-year contract. Less than two months later, Lyngby announced they had sold Gudjohnson to Belgian club Gent, in what is reputed to be the biggest ever sale for the club.

On 31 August 2025, Guðjohnsen joined Blackburn Rovers on a three-year deal for an undisclosed fee. On 25 October 2025, Guðjohnsen scored his first goal for Blackburn Rovers, netting the winner in a 2–1 victory over Southampton, which was also the club's first home win of the season. The following match, Guðjohnsen scored a brace for Rovers in a 2–0 win over Leicester City at the King Power Stadium.

Guðjohnsen finished his first EFL Championship season with seven goals in 25 appearances. He missed the final months of the campaign after initially suffering a hamstring injury in March, before sustaining an ankle injury during his rehabilitation. On 13 March 2026, Rovers announced that Guðjohnsen had signed a new long-term contract with the club, with the length of the deal undisclosed.

Guðjohnsen scored in consecutive matches at the start of the 2026–27 season, scoring the equaliser in a 2–1 win over Burton Albion in the first round of the EFL Cup, before scoring in a 2–2 draw against Wolverhampton Wanderers in the opening round of the Championship at Molineux Stadium. He scored again, in his third consecutive game, during a 2–1 over Middlesbrough at Ewood Park.

== International career ==
Andri has played with several Icelandic youth groups. One of his youth international career highs was when he scored a hat trick against Germany, qualifying his team for Euro U17 2019.

On 25 January 2021, Andri was called up to the Icelandic senior national team for the first time. He made his debut on 2 September 2021 in a World Cup qualifier against Romania, a 0–2 home loss. He substituted Albert Guðmundsson in the 79th minute. He scored his first goal on 5 September 2021 against North Macedonia, two minutes after being substituted on in the 82nd minute.

He was part of the Iceland squad that won the 2022 Baltic Cup.

== Career statistics ==
=== Club ===
As of match played 24 October 2026

Appearances and goals by club, season and competition
Club	Season	League			National cup (Note: Includes Svenska Cupen, Danish Cup, Belgian Cup, FA Cup)		League cup (Note: Includes EFL Cup)		Europe		Total	
Club	Season	Division	Apps	Goals	Apps	Goals	Apps	Goals	Apps	Goals	Apps	Goals
Real Madrid B	2021–22	Primera División RFEF	21	4	—		—		—		21	4
IFK Norrköping	2022	Allsvenskan	13	1	1	0	—		—		14	1
IFK Norrköping	2023	Allsvenskan	16	0	3	0	—		—		19	0
IFK Norrköping	Total		29	1	4	0	—		—		33	1
Lyngby (loan)	2023–24	Danish Superliga	28	13	5	2	—		—		33	15
Gent	2024–25	Belgian Pro League	32	5	1	0	—		13 (Note: Appearances in UEFA Conference League)	0	46	5
Gent	2025–26	Belgian Pro League	2	0	0	0	—		0	0	2	0
Gent	Total		34	5	1	0	—		13	0	48	5
Blackburn Rovers	2025–26	Championship	25	7	0	0	0	0	—		25	7
Blackburn Rovers	2026–27	Championship	14	10	0	0	1	1	—		15	11
Blackburn Rovers	Total		39	17	0	0	1	1	—		40	18
Career total			151	40	10	2	1	1	13	0	175	43

=== International ===
As of match played 16 November 2026

Appearances and goals by national team and year
National team	Year	Apps	Goals
Iceland	2021	6	2
Iceland	2022	6	0
Iceland	2023	6	3
Iceland	2024	12	3
Iceland	2025	9	2
Iceland	2026	6	6
Total		45	16

Scores and results list Iceland's goal tally first, score column indicates score after each Guðjohnsen goal.

List of international goals scored by Andri Guðjohnsen
No.	Date	Venue	Opponent	Score	Result	Competition
1	5 September 2021	Laugardalsvöllur, Reykjavík, Iceland	North Macedonia	2–2	2–2	2022 FIFA World Cup qualification
2	11 October 2021	Laugardalsvöllur, Reykjavík, Iceland	Liechtenstein	4–0	4–0	2022 FIFA World Cup qualification
3	8 January 2023	Estadio da Nora, Albufeira, Portugal	Estonia	1–1	1–1	Friendly
4	26 March 2023	Rheinpark Stadion, Vaduz, Liechtenstein	Liechtenstein	6–0	7–0	UEFA Euro 2024 qualifying
5	16 November 2023	Tehelné pole, Bratislava, Slovakia	Slovakia	2–4	2–4	UEFA Euro 2024 qualifying
6	17 January 2024	DRV PNK Stadium, Fort Lauderdale, United States	Honduras	2–0	2–0	Friendly
7	14 October 2024	Laugardalsvöllur, Reykjavík, Iceland	Turkey	2–0	2–4	2024–25 UEFA Nations League B
8	19 November 2024	Cardiff City Stadium, Cardiff, Wales	Wales	1–0	1–4	2024–25 UEFA Nations League B
9	6 June 2025	Hampden Park, Glasgow, Scotland	Scotland	1–0	3–1	Friendly
10	9 September 2025	Parc des Princes, Paris, France	France	1–0	1–2	2026 FIFA World Cup qualification
11	26 September 2026	Laugardalsvöllur, Reykjavík, Iceland	Estonia	1–0	1–1	2026–27 UEFA Nations League C
12	29 September 2026	Stade de Luxembourg, Luxembourg City, Luxembourg	Luxembourg	1–0	3–0	2026–27 UEFA Nations League C
13	13 November 2026	Hristo Botev Stadium, Plovdiv, Bulgaria	Bulgaria	1–0	5–0	2026–27 UEFA Nations League C
14	13 November 2026	Hristo Botev Stadium, Plovdiv, Bulgaria	Bulgaria	4–0	5–0	2026–27 UEFA Nations League C
15	13 November 2026	Hristo Botev Stadium, Plovdiv, Bulgaria	Bulgaria	5–0	5–0	2026–27 UEFA Nations League C
16	16 November 2026	Laugardalsvöllur, Reykjavík, Iceland	Luxembourg	2–0	3–0	2026–27 UEFA Nations League C

== Honours ==
Iceland

- Baltic Cup: 2022
