= Arnór Guðjohnsen =

Icelandic footballer (born 1961)

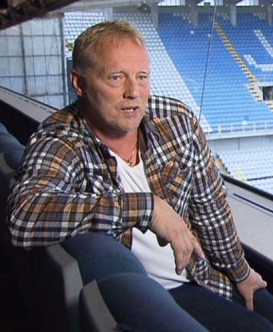
- Arnór in 2016

Personal information
- Date of birth: 30 July 1961 (age 65)
- Place of birth: Reykjavík, Iceland
- Height: 1.78 m (5 ft 10 in)
- Position: Striker

Youth career
- –1978: Víkingur

Senior career*
Years	Team	Apps	(Gls)
1978	Víkingur	12	(7)
1978–1983	Lokeren	138	(26)
1983–1990	Anderlecht	139	(40)
1990–1992	Bordeaux	52	(8)
1993	Häcken	24	(4)
1994–1998	Örebro	100	(24)
1998–2000	Valur	41	(22)
2001	Stjarnan	18	(5)
Total		524	(136)

International career
1978	Iceland U19	2	(0)
1978	Iceland U21	1	(0)
1979–1997	Iceland	73	(14)
- * Club domestic league appearances and goals

Arnór Guðjohnsen (born 30 April 1961) is an Icelandic former professional footballer who played as a striker. He spent seven years with Belgian club Anderlecht and was the top scorer in the 1986–87 season. He is the father of striker Eiður Guðjohnsen and the grandfather of striker Sveinn Aron Guðjohnsen. His younger son, also named Arnór, signed for Swansea City in July 2017, at the age of 16.

== Club career ==
Starting his career at Víkingur in Iceland, Arnór also played for Valur and Stjarnan, Lokeren and Anderlecht in Belgium, Bordeaux in France, Häcken and Örebro in Sweden.

Arnór took the final penalty of the 1984 UEFA Cup final shootout which was saved by Tottenham's Tony Parks.

== International career ==
Arnór is the father and agent of striker Eiður Guðjohnsen. Arnór and Eiður are the only father and son to play for a national football team during the same game, in a match on 24 April 1996 in which Iceland beat Estonia 3–0 in Tallinn. Arnór was 34 and Eiður was 17 at the time. Eiður came on as a second-half substitute for his father, so they never actually played together.

At 2, he had been asked his biggest wish, to which he replied "to play international football alongside Eiður". However, shortly before a match in Reykjavik in which father and son were scheduled to appear alongside one another, Eiður broke his ankle in an Under-18 tournament. He missed the next two seasons, in which time Arnór retired from football. Arnór later said "It remains my biggest regret that we didn't get to play together, and I know it's Eiður's too".

Arnór played 73 games for the Icelandic national team and scored 14 goals, four of them in a game against Turkey. He played his last international in October 1997 against Liechtenstein.

== Career statistics ==
Appearances and goals listed by year
National team	Year	Apps	Goals
Iceland
Iceland	1979	2	0
Iceland	1980	3	0
Iceland	1981	3	0
Iceland	1982	4	1
Iceland	1983	3	0
Iceland	1984	2	0
Iceland	1985	1	0
Iceland	1986	5	2
Iceland	1987	2	0
Iceland	1988	3	0
Iceland	1989	2	0
Iceland	1990	5	2
Iceland	1991	7	4
Iceland	1992	3	0
Iceland	1993	6	2
Iceland	1994	5	0
Iceland	1995	5	0
Iceland	1996	7	2
Iceland	1997	5	1
Total		73	14

Iceland score listed first, score column indicates score after each Arnór goal.

International goals by date, venue, cap, opponent, score, result and competition
No.	Date	Venue	Cap	Opponent	Score	Result	Competition
1	2 June 1982	Laugardalsvöllur, Reykjavík, Iceland	9	England	1–0	1–1	Friendly
2	25 May 1986	Laugardalsvöllur, Reykjavík, Iceland	19	Republic of Ireland	1–1	1–2	Iceland Triangular Tournament
3	24 September 1986	Laugardalsvöllur, Reykjavík, Iceland	22	Soviet Union	1–0	1–1	UEFA Euro 1988 qualifying
4	30 May 1990	Laugardalsvöllur, Reykjavík, Iceland	31	Albania	1–0	2–0	UEFA Euro 1992 qualifying
5	8 August 1990	Ovara Vølli í Gundadali, Tórshavn, Faroe Islands	32	Faroe Islands	3–2	3–2	Friendly
6	17 July 1991	Laugardalsvöllur, Reykjavík, Iceland	39	Turkey	2–1	5–1	Friendly
7	17 July 1991	Laugardalsvöllur, Reykjavík, Iceland	39	Turkey	3–1	5–1	Friendly
8	17 July 1991	Laugardalsvöllur, Reykjavík, Iceland	39	Turkey	4–1	5–1	Friendly
9	17 July 1991	Laugardalsvöllur, Reykjavík, Iceland	39	Turkey	5–1	5–1	Friendly
10	20 May 1993	Stade Municipal, Luxembourg City, Luxembourg	47	Luxembourg	1–0	1–1	1994 FIFA World Cup qualification
11	16 June 1993	Laugardalsvöllur, Reykjavík, Iceland	49	Hungary	2–0	2–0	1994 FIFA World Cup qualification
12	11 February 1996	Ta' Qali National Stadium, Ta' Qali, Malta	64	Malta	4–0	4–1	1996 Rothmans International Tournament
13	1 June 1996	Laugardalsvöllur, Reykjavík, Iceland	66	Macedonia	1–1	1–1	1998 FIFA World Cup qualification
14	11 October 1997	Laugardalsvöllur, Reykjavík, Iceland	73	Liechtenstein	3–0	4–0	1998 FIFA World Cup qualification

== Honours ==
Anderlecht

- Belgian First Division: 1984–85, 1985–86, 1986–87
- Belgian Cup: 1987–88, 1988–89
- Belgian Super Cup: 1985, 1987
- UEFA Cup runner-up: 1983–84
- European Cup Winners' Cup runner-up: 1989–90

Bordeaux

- Ligue 2: 1991–92

Individual

- Belgian First Division top scorer: 1986–87 (19 goals)
- Man of the Season (Belgian First Division): 1986–87
