= Iceland national football team =

Men's association football team

Iceland
- Nickname: Strákarnir okkar (Our Boys)
- Association: Knattspyrnusamband Íslands (KSÍ)
- Confederation: UEFA (Europe)
- Head coach: Arnar Gunnlaugsson
- Captain: Orri Óskarsson
- Most caps: Birkir Bjarnason; Aron Gunnarsson (113)
- Top scorer: Gylfi Sigurðsson (28)
- Home stadium: Laugardalsvöllur
- FIFA code: ISL
First colours	Second colours

FIFA ranking
- Current: 70 ▲3 (18 November 2026)
- Highest: 18 (February–March 2018)
- Lowest: 131 (April–June 2012)

First international
- Unofficial; Faroe Islands 0–1 Iceland (Tórshavn, Faroe Islands; 29 July 1930); Official; Iceland 0–3 Denmark (Reykjavík, Iceland; 17 July 1946)

Biggest win
- Unofficial; Iceland 9–0 Faroe Islands (Keflavík, Iceland; 10 July 1985); Official; Liechtenstein 0–7 Iceland (Vaduz, Liechtenstein; 26 March 2023)

Biggest defeat
- Denmark 14–2 Iceland (Copenhagen, Denmark; 23 August 1967)

World Cup
- Appearances: 1 (first in 2018)
- Best result: Group stage (2018)

European Championship
- Appearances: 1 (first in 2016)
- Best result: Quarter-finals (2016)

Greenland Cup
- Appearances: 2 (first in 1980)
- Best result: Champions (1980, 1984)

Baltic Cup
- Appearances: 1 (first in 2022)
- Best result: Champions (2022)

The Iceland national football team (Icelandic: Íslenska karlalandsliðið í knattspyrnu) represents Iceland in men's international football. The team is controlled by the Football Association of Iceland, and have been a FIFA member since 1947 and a UEFA member since 1957. The team's nickname is Strákarnir okkar, which means Our Boys in Icelandic.

The team enjoyed success in the second half of the 2010s. In the qualifying rounds for the 2014 FIFA World Cup, Iceland reached the playoffs before losing to Croatia. Iceland reached its first major tournament, UEFA Euro 2016, after a qualification campaign which included home and away wins over the Netherlands. After reaching the knockout stages of Euro 2016, Iceland defeated England in the round of 16, advancing to the quarter-finals, where they lost to host nation France 5–2. The team qualified for the 2018 tournament on 9 October 2017, becoming the smallest nation by population to clinch a FIFA World Cup spot. (Note: This record was eventually broken by Curaçao when they qualified for the 2026 tournament.) They drew with Argentina in their opening match, but went out in the group stage.

== History ==
=== 20th century ===
Although Úrvalsdeild, the Icelandic Football League, was founded in 1912, the country's first international match was played on 29 July 1930, against the Faroe Islands. Although Iceland won 1–0 away, both teams were at the time unaffiliated with FIFA. The first match officially recognised by FIFA took place in Reykjavík on 17 July 1946, a 0–3 loss to their future rivals Denmark. The first international victory was against Finland in 1947. For the first 20 years of the Football Association of Iceland (KSÍ)'s existence, the team mostly did not participate in qualifying for the FIFA World Cup or the UEFA European Championship. In 1954, Iceland applied to take part in qualification for the 1954 World Cup, but the application was rejected. In qualification for the 1958 World Cup, Iceland finished last in their group with zero wins, conceding 26 goals.

In 1980, Iceland won the first edition of the friendly tournament known as the Greenland Cup.

Since 1974, the team has taken part in qualifying for every World Cup and European Championship. In 1994, the team reached their then best ever position in the FIFA World Rankings, 37th. This record stood until 2016 when they managed to reach 21st. In a friendly against Estonia on 24 April 1996 in Tallinn, Eiður Smári Guðjohnsen entered as a substitute for his father Arnór. This marked the first time that a father and son played in the same international match.

=== 21st century ===
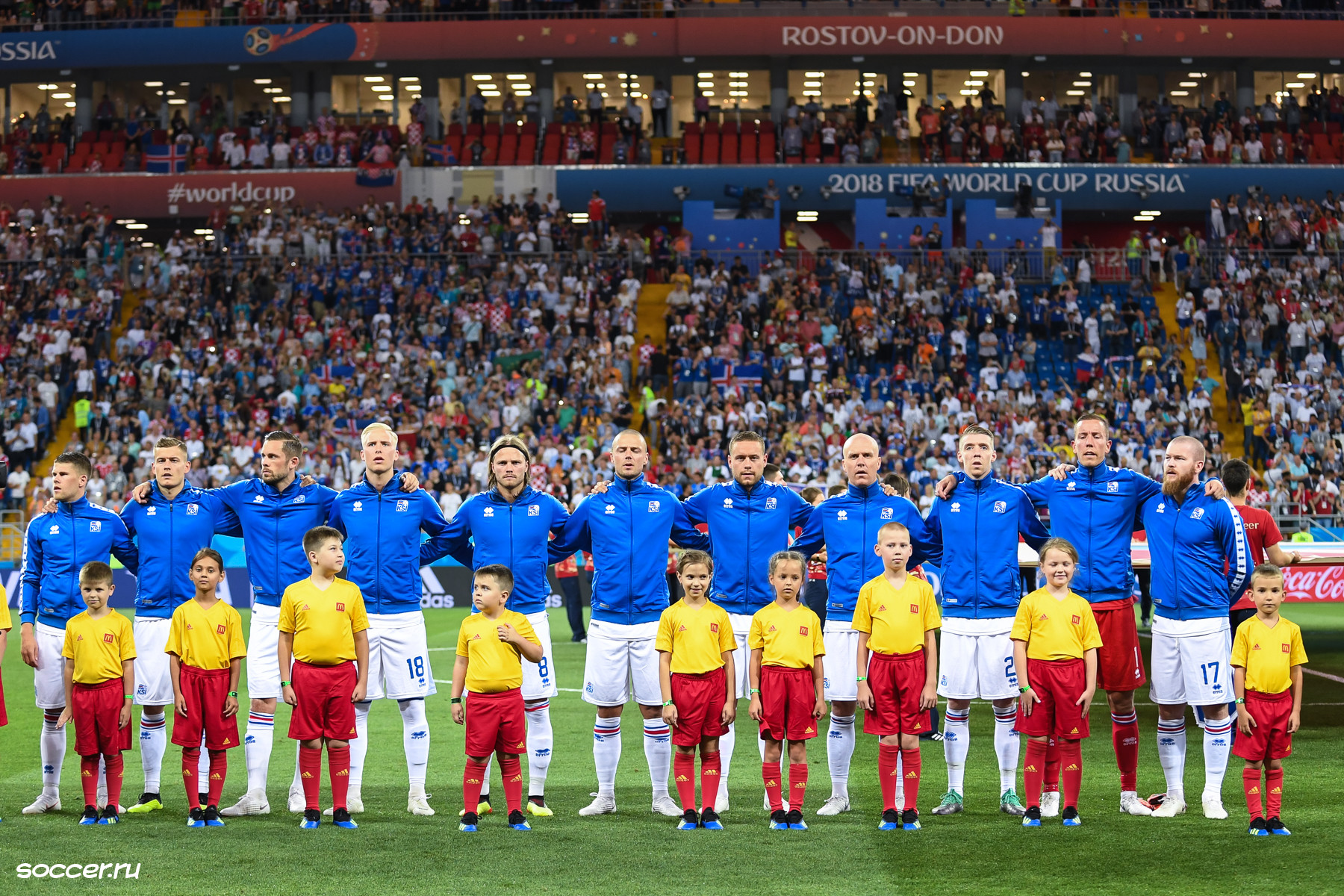
Iceland national football team at the 2018 FIFA World Cup in Rostov-on-Don, Russia

In qualification for Euro 2004, Iceland finished third in their group, one point behind Scotland. As a result, they failed to qualify for a playoff spot.

However, the following qualifying campaigns were much more difficult for Iceland, which finished near the last places of their respective groups. During the Euro 2008 qualifiers, Iceland scored two unexpected successes against Northern Ireland (3–0 in the opening away, 2–1 at home in the return), then heroically resisted in the first and second leg against Spain, winners of the competition (a 1–1 draw at home after having led the score and a short 0–1 defeat away). But Iceland suffered several other heavy defeats, surprisingly losing twice to Latvia (0–4 away, 2–4 home), which had qualified for Euro 2004. Iceland also lost to Liechtenstein (0–3 away, after a 1–1 home draw).

Iceland's poor results were due to the absence of professionals on the island and the country's hostile climate, where winter lasts for 8 months. The development of the sport was stifled by the dearth of soccer pitches: There were only two synthetic fields, so players trained on gravel or in snow. In the 2000s, Icelandic soccer experienced a real revolution. The economic boom allowed the authorities to create important structures with indoor pitches in synthetic turf, allowing training year-round regardless of weather conditions. These new structures encouraged young people to turn to sports and even led to a decrease in alcohol and tobacco consumption among teenagers.

In 2014, Iceland almost secured qualification for their first World Cup. Finishing second in Group D, they played Croatia in a two-leg playoff for qualification. After holding them to a 0–0 draw in the home leg, they lost 2–0 away.

==== Euro 2016 ====
Iceland qualified for a major tournament for the first time in 2015 after finishing second in Group A of qualification for Euro 2016, losing only two games, and beating the Netherlands – which had finished third in the 2014 World Cup – twice. During the qualification, they reached their then highest ranking in the FIFA World Rankings, 23rd. Iceland were drawn into a group with Portugal, Hungary and Austria for the final tournament.

At the tournament finals, Iceland recorded 1–1 draws in their first two group stage matches against Portugal and Hungary. They then advanced from their group with a 2–1 victory against Austria. Iceland qualified for the tournament's quarter-finals after a 2–1 upset win over England in the Round of 16, which led to England manager Roy Hodgson resigning in disgrace immediately after the final whistle. However, they were eliminated by host nation France in the quarter-finals, 5–2.

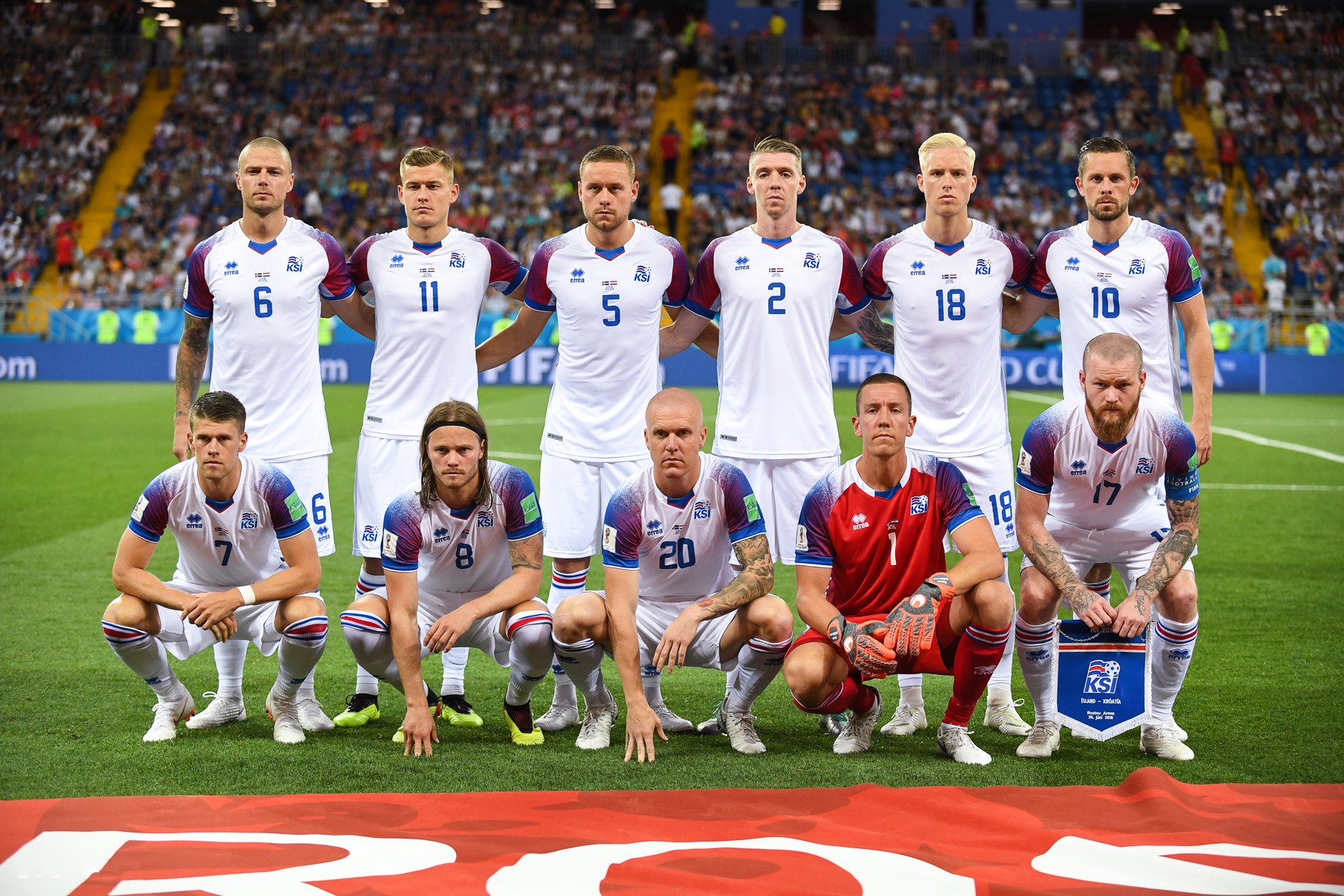
World Cup team 2018

==== 2018 World Cup ====
Iceland qualified for the 2018 World Cup, their first ever appearance in the world championship and second major tournament overall, securing qualification on 9 October 2017 after a 2–0 win against Kosovo. In doing so, they became the lowest-populated country ever to reach the finals until Curaçao broke both records in 2026. Iceland were drawn to play Croatia, Argentina and Nigeria in a group that was considered by many as the "group of death". Despite a challenging group, Iceland were tipped to advance from the group by several journalist websites, based on their impressive performance in Euro 2016. Their maiden match at the World Cup was against 2014 runners-up Argentina, with Iceland holding Argentina to a 1–1 draw. However, their chances of advancing from the group were hurt following a 2–0 loss to Nigeria, with several missed opportunities in the first half and a penalty kick in the second half missed by Gylfi Sigurðsson, putting Iceland in position to play a decisive match against already qualified Croatia. Iceland lost to Croatia in their final group game and were eliminated; and because Argentina won against Nigeria, Iceland finished bottom of the group with a single point.

==== 2018–19 UEFA Nations League ====
After Euro 2016 and the 2018 World Cup, Iceland participated in the 2018–19 UEFA Nations League, in which they were in Group 2 of League A with Switzerland and Belgium. Many of Iceland's international matches in this competition were undermined by the repeated absence of some of their key players, often due to injury. Iceland lost all four games and faced relegation to League B, but due to a rule change by UEFA, Iceland was not relegated to League B for the 2020–2021 edition.

==== Euro 2020 qualifiers ====
In group H of the Euro qualifiers with the world champions France, Turkey, Albania, Andorra and Moldova. Iceland lost both confrontations against Les Bleus (4–0 at the Stade de France and 1–0 at home on a penalty kick after the hour of play at the end of a tight game) and the away match against Albania 4–2, though achieved a win and a draw against Turkey. Iceland finished third behind France and Turkey and advanced to the playoffs, where they defeated Romania 2–1. On 12 November 2020, in their playoff game against Hungary, Iceland nearly secured qualification for Euro 2020, having led 1–0 for most of the match, thanks to a direct free kick by Gylfi Sigurðsson. However, Hungary scored two goals in under five minutes, the first in the 88th minute by Loïc Nego and the second in the second minute of added time by Dominik Szoboszlai, proving to be the winner, thereby securing qualification at Iceland's expense.

Iceland had also suffered poor results in their UEFA Nations League campaign in League A, having lost all their group stage matches and failing to garner a single point, resulting in their relegation to League B the following season. Manager Erik Hamrén ultimately resigned, following their poor performance that year.

==== 2022 World Cup qualifiers ====
Iceland also had a poor start to 2022 World Cup qualifiers, suffering two defeats at the beginning of the tournament, away against Germany (0–3) and more surprisingly in Armenia (0–2). Preparation for the September games, where Iceland had the advantage of playing all three games at home after several away games and had played some encouraging friendlies in June, was disrupted by extra-sporting affairs involving both Kolbeinn Sigþórsson and Gylfi Sigurðsson accused of sexual offences and thus absent from the month's games. The cases also led to the resignation of several senior officials of the Icelandic Football Association, including its president. In the aftermath of these affairs, Iceland lost against Romania (0–2), drew against North Macedonia (2–2), and suffered a heavy loss against Germany (0–4); these results left Iceland in second-to-last place in Group J with four matches remaining. In the two October games, Iceland drew against Armenia (1–1) and defeated Liechtenstein (4–0). Despite these results, along with an away draw against Romania (0–0), Iceland was mathematically eliminated with one day remaining, being unable to recover enough points to reach second place.

This run of poor results has been attributed to several factors, both sporting and extra-sporting: the late generational renewal, a process partly hampered by a limited pool of footballers due to Iceland's demographics; the questionable tactical choices of the new coach, resulting in a lack of automatism among new players who are not used to playing together and the absence of a real standard team; and sexual assault scandals that have effectively sidelined some of the team's best players under investigation.

==== Euro 2024 qualifiers ====
The Euro 2024 qualifiers have also got off to a poor start in terms of results, with just one win and 3 defeats after 4 matches and a provisional penultimate place. Iceland were swept aside in Bosnia (0–3), before recording the biggest official victory in their history against Liechtenstein (7–0). Following a long series of poor results, Icelandic coach Arnar Viðarsson was sacked and replaced by Norwegian Åge Hareide. Under the new coach and after two away games, Iceland hosted Slovakia and Portugal, but both matches ended in defeat. First, Strákarnir okkar lost to the Slovaks (1–2) after a crude defensive error with a direct clearance to Tomáš Suslov, who scored Slovakia's 2nd goal when the teams were level. Iceland then put in a better performance than in their previous matches against group favourites Portugal, demonstrating excellent tactical organization and keeping the Lusitanians at bay for long periods. However, a goal by Cristiano Ronaldo on his 200th appearance for Portugal, initially disallowed but then validated by VAR at the very end of normal time, sealed Portugal's victory (0–1), shortly after the Nordic side had been reduced to 10 men following a second yellow card for Willum Þór Willumsson. Iceland finished 4th in their group with a disappointing record of 3 wins, 1 draw and 6 defeats, but were eligible for the play-offs thanks to their performance in the Nations League. In the semi-final of the Path B play-offs, Iceland set a benchmark against a top 100 FIFA team for the first time in several years by brushing aside Israel 4–1, thanks to a hat-trick from Albert Guðmundsson, while Israel finished the match with 10 men and missed a penalty to equalise. In the decisive match against Ukraine, Iceland opened the scoring through Albert Guðmundsson and led at half-time, but conceded 2 goals in the second half and lost (1–2) in a similar fashion to the previous Euro play-off lost in Budapest against the Hungarians.

Iceland then had a complicated 2024–2025 Nations League, as they were relegated to League C for the next edition, despite having started in the highest League (League A) for the first 2 seasons. Strákarnir okkar finished 3rd in their group, just ahead of Montenegro, whom they beat 2–0 on each occasion, but suffered 3 heavy defeats (against Wales away and twice against Turkey) and a home draw against the Welsh. Iceland's penultimate place in the group means they are eligible for the 2024–2025 Nations League promotion/relegation play-offs, where they face Kosovo, who finished 2nd in their League C group. Iceland lost the first leg 1–2 in Pristina and had to turn the tie around in the home leg, which was actually played on neutral ground at the Estadio Nueva Condomina in Murcia, Spain, due to renovation work at Laugardalsvöllur, Iceland's only stadium to UEFA standards. Deprived of this advantage and reduced to 10 men during the match, they lost again 1–3 (2–5 on aggregate) and failed to maintain their place in League B.

== Team image ==
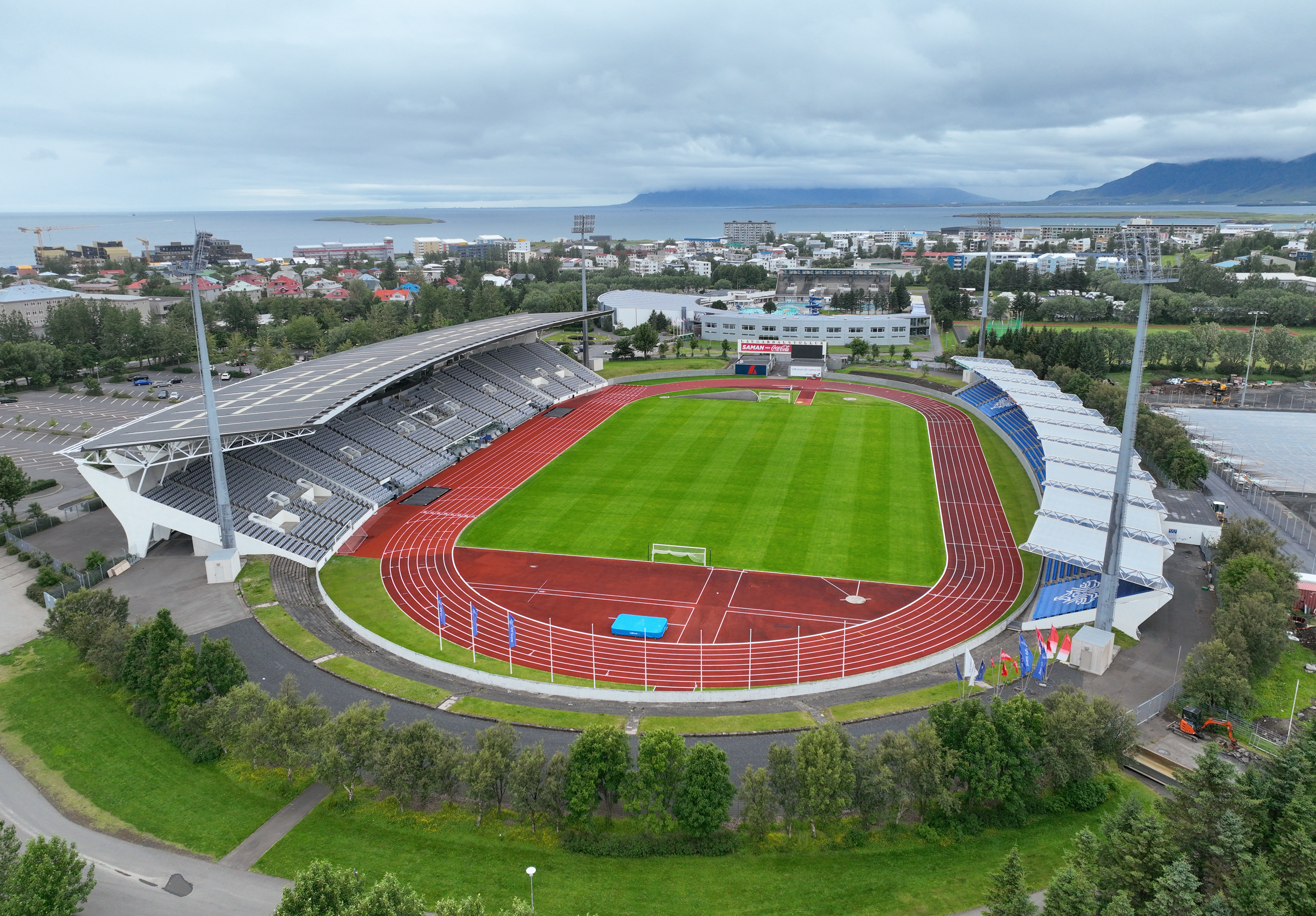
Laugardalsvöllur, Iceland's national football stadium

The national team uses blue as the home colours and white as their second colours; their crest features stylized imagery of Iceland's four landvættir (guardian spirits) in local folklore: a giant, a dragon, a bull, and an eagle. The team's crest was adopted in 2020 and was designed by Reykjavík-based firm Bradenburg. Previously the team had used a team crest which featured a shield-type symbol which consisted of the abbreviation of the Football Association of Iceland in Icelandic (KSI), stripes in the colors of the Flag of Iceland, and a football.

Iceland's supporters became known for using the Viking Thunder Clap chant in the mid-2010s, which involves fans clapping their hands above their heads and yelling "huh!" to the beat of a drum; the tradition originates from Scottish club Motherwell. Iceland's Viking Clap first received wider international attention during Euro 2016.

=== Kit providers ===
The official kit is produced by German sports manufacturing company Puma since 2020. Before that the kit providers were Umbro (1975), Adidas (1976–1992), ABM (1992–1996), Reusch (1996–2001) and Erreà (2002–2020)

Kit provider	Period
(England) Umbro	1975
(Germany) Adidas	1976–1991
(Italy) ABM	1992–1996
(Germany) Reusch	1996–2001
(Italy) Erreà	2002–2020
(Germany) Puma	2020–present

== Results and fixtures ==
The following is a list of match results in the last 12 months, as well as any future matches that have been scheduled.

Win Draw Loss Fixture

=== 2026 ===
25 February 2026 Friendly	Mexico	4–0	Iceland	Querétaro, Mexico
20:00 UTC−6	Ledezma 22'; González 24'; Gallardo 59'; Gutiérrez 90+2'	Report		Stadium: Estadio Corregidora; Attendance: 34,130; Referee: Steven Madrigal (Costa Rica)

28 March 2026 Friendly	Canada	2–2	Iceland	Toronto, Canada
13:00 UTC−4	David 67' (pen.), 75' (pen.); Buchanan (red card) 80'	Report	Óskarsson 9', 21'	Stadium: BMO Field; Attendance: 26,328; Referee: Jon Freemon (United States)

31 March 2026 Friendly	Haiti	1–1	Iceland	Toronto, Canada
13:30 UTC−4 (Note: The match originally scheduled for 12:30 (UTC−4), but was delayed due to bad weather.)	Isidor 88'	Report	Sigurðsson 61'	Stadium: BMO Field; Attendance: 0 Referee: Carly Shaw-Maclaren (Canada)

31 May 2026 Kirin Challenge Cup 2026	Japan	1–0	Iceland	Tokyo, Japan
19:25 UTC+9	Ogawa 87'	Report		Stadium: National Stadium; Attendance: 62,212; Referee: Damian Kos (Poland)

9 June 2026 Friendly	Argentina	3–0	Iceland	Auburn, United States
20:00 UTC−6	Barco 8'; Messi 72' (pen.); Almada 86'	Report		Stadium: Jordan–Hare Stadium; Attendance: 88,043; Referee: Rosendo Mendoza (United States)

26 September 2026 2026–27 Nations League	Iceland	1–1	Estonia	Reykjavík, Iceland
16:00 UTC+0	Guðjohnsen 45'	Report	Paskotši 64'	Stadium: Laugardalsvöllur; Attendance: 5,320; Referee: Miloš Milanović (Serbia)

29 September 2026 2026–27 Nations League	Luxembourg	0–3	Iceland	Luxembourg City, Luxembourg
20:45 UTC+2		Report	Guðjohnsen 13'; Óskarsson 39'; Pálsson 73'	Stadium: Stade de Luxembourg; Attendance: 8,879; Referee: Enea Jorgji (Albania)

3 October 2026 2026–27 Nations League	Iceland	3–0	Bulgaria	Reykjavík, Iceland
16:00 UTC+0	Óskarsson 37', 60'; Ellertsson 90'	Report		Stadium: Laugardalsvöllur; Attendance: 5,069; Referee: Balázs Berke (Hungary)

6 October 2026 2026–27 Nations League	Estonia	0–0	Iceland	Tallinn, Estonia
21:45 UTC+3		Report		Stadium: Lilleküla Stadium; Attendance: 5,987; Referee: David Dickinson (Scotland)

13 November 2026 2026–27 Nations League	Bulgaria	0–5	Iceland	Plovdiv, Bulgaria
21:45 UTC+2		Report	Guðjohnsen 17' (pen.), 68', 79'; Óskarsson 21'; Tsenov 52' (o.g.)	Stadium: Hristo Botev Stadium; Attendance: 1,150; Referee: Florian Badstübner (Germany)

16 November 2026 2026–27 Nations League	Iceland	3–0	Luxembourg	Reykjavík, Iceland
17:00 UTC+0	Willumsson 25'; Guðjohnsen 37' (pen.); Ellertsson 50'	Report		Stadium: Laugardalsvöllur; Attendance: 2,644; Referee: Marian Barbu (Romania)

== Coaching staff ==
Position	Name
Head coach	(Iceland) Arnar Gunnlaugsson
Assistant coach	(Iceland) Davíð Snorri Jónasson
Technical advisor	(Iceland) Bjarni Jakobsson
Training coach	(Iceland) Birkir Eyjólfsson
Fitness coach	(Iceland) Ari Þór Örlygsson
First-Team Doctor	(Iceland) Jóhannes Rúnarsson
Goalkeeper coach	(Iceland) Halldór Björnsson
Athletic coach	(Iceland) Arnór Snær Guðmundsson
Physiotherapist	(Iceland) Sverrir Sigþórsson

== Players ==
=== Current squad ===
The following players were selected for the 2026–27 UEFA Nations League matches against Bulgaria on 13 November and Luxembourg on 16 November 2026.

Caps and goals are correct as of 16 November 2026, after the match against Luxembourg.

No.	Pos.	Player	Date of birth (age)	Caps	Goals	Club
1	GK	Rúnar Alex Rúnarsson	18 February 1995 (age 31)	27	0	(Danish Football Association) Copenhagen
12	GK	Hákon Valdimarsson	13 October 2001 (age 25)	28	0	(The Football Association) Brentford
13	GK	Anton Ari Einarsson	25 August 1994 (age 32)	2	0	(Football Association of Iceland) Breiðablik
2	DF	Logi Tómasson	13 September 2000 (age 26)	22	1	(Turkish Football Federation) Samsunspor
3	DF	Daníel Leó Grétarsson	2 October 1995 (age 31)	37	0	(Danish Football Association) AGF
4	DF	Victor Pálsson	30 April 1991 (age 35)	64	6	(Danish Football Association) Horsens
14	DF	Aron Gunnarsson ^{RET}	22 April 1989 (age 37)	113	5	(Qatar Football Association) Qatar SC
16	DF	Hjörtur Hermannsson	8 February 1995 (age 31)	32	0	(Swedish Football Association) IFK Göteborg
19	DF	Mikael Egill Ellertsson	11 March 2002 (age 24)	36	4	(Italian Football Federation) Genoa
23	DF	Hörður Björgvin Magnússon	11 February 1993 (age 33)	58	2	(Hellenic Football Federation) Atromitos
7	MF	Hákon Haraldsson (vice-captain)	10 April 2003 (age 23)	37	3	(French Football Federation) Lille
8	MF	Ísak Jóhannesson	23 March 2003 (age 23)	50	6	(German Football Association) 1. FC Köln
10	MF	Gylfi Sigurðsson	8 September 1989 (age 37)	92	28	(Football Association of Iceland) Víkingur Reykjavík
11	MF	Jón Dagur Þorsteinsson	26 November 1998 (age 27)	58	6	(German Football Association) Hertha BSC
15	MF	Kristall Máni Ingason	18 January 2002 (age 24)	11	0	(Norwegian Football Federation) Brann
18	MF	Mikael Anderson	1 July 1998 (age 28)	42	2	(Danish Football Association) AGF
20	MF	Kristian Hlynsson	23 January 2004 (age 22)	14	2	(Royal Dutch Football Association) Twente
21	MF	Arnór Sigurðsson	15 May 1999 (age 27)	40	2	(Hellenic Football Federation) Kalamata
	MF	Stefán Teitur Þórðarson	16 October 1998 (age 28)	41	1	(German Football Association) Hannover 96
	MF	Þórir Jóhann Helgason	28 September 2000 (age 26)	20	2	(Italian Football Federation) Venezia
5	FW	Ísak Þorvaldsson	1 May 2001 (age 25)	10	1	(Danish Football Association) Lyngby
9	FW	Orri Óskarsson (captain)	29 August 2004 (age 22)	24	13	(Royal Spanish Football Federation) Real Sociedad
17	FW	Brynjólfur Willumsson	12 August 2000 (age 26)	14	2	(Royal Dutch Football Association) Groningen
22	FW	Andri Guðjohnsen	29 January 2002 (age 24)	45	16	(The Football Association) Blackburn Rovers

=== Recent call-ups ===
The following players have also been called up to the Iceland squad in the last twelve months.

Pos.	Player	Date of birth (age)	Caps	Goals	Club	Latest call-up
GK	Elías Ólafsson	11 March 2000 (age 26)	15	0	(Denmark) Midtjylland	v. Estonia, 26 September 2026 ^{INJ}
GK	Ögmundur Kristinsson	19 June 1989 (age 37)	19	0	(Iceland) Víkingur Reykjavík	v. Japan, 31 May 2026
GK	Adam Ingi Benediktsson	28 October 2002 (age 24)	0	0	(Denmark) AB	v. Japan, 31 May 2026
GK	Viktor Freyr Sigurðsson	10 July 2000 (age 26)	0	0	(Iceland) Fram	v. Mexico, 26 February 2026
DF	Bjarki Steinn Bjarkason	11 May 2000 (age 26)	7	0	(Italy) Südtirol	v. Estonia, 6 October 2026
DF	Dagur Dan Þórhallsson	2 May 2000 (age 26)	10	0	(United States) San Diego FC	v. Argentina, 9 June 2026
DF	Sverrir Ingi Ingason	5 August 1993 (age 33)	66	4	(Greece) Panathinaikos	v. Japan, 31 May 2026 ^{WD}
DF	Alfons Sampsted	6 April 1998 (age 28)	23	0	(Netherlands) Go Ahead Eagles	v. Japan, 31 May 2026
DF	Valgeir Lunddal Friðriksson	24 September 2001 (age 25)	16	0	(Denmark) Viborg	v. Japan, 31 May 2026
DF	Guðmundur Þórarinsson	15 April 1992 (age 34)	16	0	(Iceland) ÍA	v. Mexico, 26 February 2026
DF	Höskuldur Gunnlaugsson	26 September 1994 (age 32)	9	0	(Iceland) Breiðablik	v. Mexico, 26 February 2026
DF	Guðmundur Kristjánsson	1 March 1989 (age 37)	7	0	(Iceland) Stjarnan	v. Mexico, 26 February 2026
DF	Damir Muminovic	13 May 1990 (age 36)	7	0	(Iceland) Grindavík	v. Mexico, 26 February 2026
DF	Karl Friðleifur Gunnarsson	6 July 2001 (age 25)	1	0	(Iceland) Víkingur Reykjavík	v. Mexico, 26 February 2026
DF	Hans Viktor Guðmundsson	9 September 1996 (age 30)	1	0	(Iceland) KA	v. Mexico, 26 February 2026
MF	Andri Baldursson	10 January 2002 (age 24)	15	0	(Turkey) Kasımpaşa	v. Estonia, 6 October 2026
MF	Gísli Þórðarson	12 September 2004 (age 22)	4	0	(Germany) FC St. Pauli	v. Argentina, 9 June 2026
MF	Willum Þór Willumsson	23 October 1998 (age 28)	19	0	(Netherlands) NEC	v. Japan, 31 May 2026
MF	Jóhann Berg Guðmundsson	27 October 1990 (age 36)	102	8	Retired	v. Mexico, 26 February 2026 ^{RET}
MF	Aron Elís Þrándarson	10 November 1994 (age 32)	17	1	(Iceland) Víkingur Reykjavík	v. Mexico, 26 February 2026 ^{WD}
MF	Aron Sigurðarson	8 October 1993 (age 33)	8	2	(Iceland) KR	v. Mexico, 26 February 2026 ^{WD}
MF	Kolbeinn Þórðarson	12 March 2000 (age 26)	3	0	(Sweden) IFK Göteborg	v. Mexico, 26 February 2026
MF	Birnir Snær Ingason	4 December 1996 (age 29)	2	0	(Iceland) Stjarnan	v. Mexico, 26 February 2026
MF	Daníel Hafsteinsson	12 November 1999 (age 27)	2	0	(Iceland) Víkingur Reykjavík	v. Mexico, 26 February 2026
MF	Hallgrímur Mar Steingrímsson	2 October 1990 (age 36)	1	0	(Iceland) KA	v. Mexico, 26 February 2026
MF	Baldur Kári Helgason	8 February 2005 (age 21)	1	0	(Iceland) FH	v. Mexico, 26 February 2026
MF	Haukur Andri Haraldsson	24 August 2005 (age 21)	0	0	(Iceland) ÍA	v. Mexico, 26 February 2026
FW	Albert Guðmundsson	15 June 1997 (age 29)	48	14	(Italy) Lazio	v. Estonia, 6 October 2026
FW	Daníel Guðjohnsen	1 March 2006 (age 20)	6	0	(Sweden) Malmö FF	v. Argentina, 9 June 2026
FW	Stefán Ingi Sigurðarson	27 January 2001 (age 25)	1	0	(Netherlands) Go Ahead Eagles	v. Japan, 31 May 2026
FW	Benoný Breki Andrésson	3 August 2005 (age 21)	1	0	(England) Stockport County	v. Japan, 31 May 2026
FW	Viktor Daðason	30 June 2008 (age 18)	0	0	(Denmark) Copenhagen	v. Japan, 31 May 2026 ^{INJ}
FW	Valdimar Þór Ingimundarson	28 April 1999 (age 27)	2	0	(Iceland) Víkingur Reykjavík	v. Mexico, 25 February 2026 ^{WD}
FW	Emil Atlason	22 July 1993 (age 33)	1	0	(Iceland) Stjarnan	v. Mexico, 26 February 2026
FW	Óskar Borgþórsson	15 July 2003 (age 23)	1	0	(Iceland) Víkingur Reykjavík	v. Mexico, 26 February 2026
FW	Helgi Guðjónsson	4 August 1999 (age 27)	1	0	(Iceland) Víkingur Reykjavík	v. Mexico, 26 February 2026
FW	Ágúst Orri Þorsteinsson	14 January 2005 (age 21)	1	0	(Netherlands) Excelsior	v. Mexico, 26 February 2026
^{INJ} Withdrew due to injury.^{RET} Retired from the national team.^{SUS} Serving suspension.^{WD} Withdrew from the squad due to non-injury issue.

== Records ==
As of 16 November 2026.
Players in bold are still active with Iceland.

=== Most appearances ===
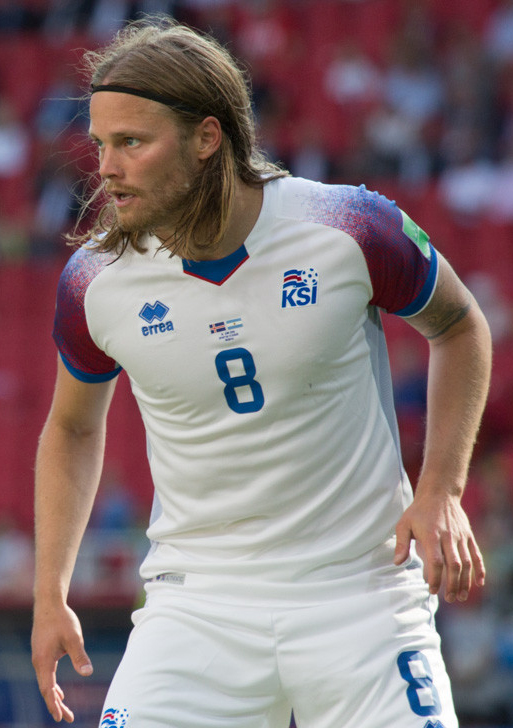
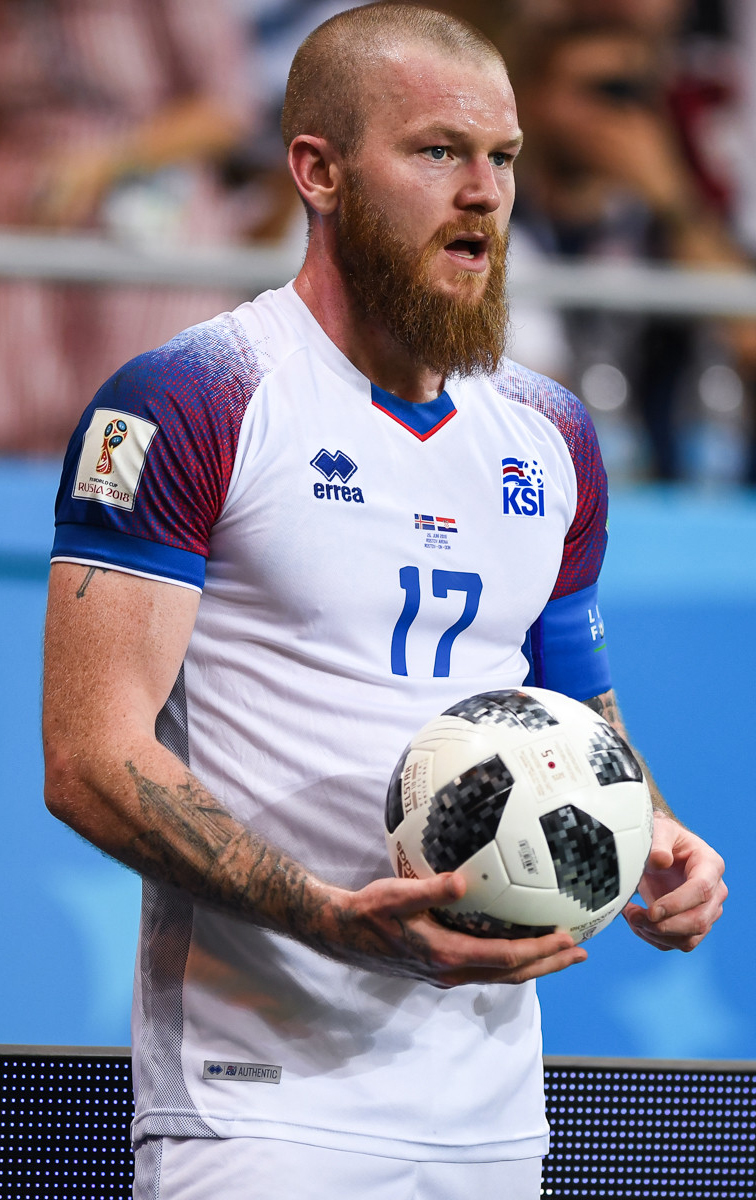
Birkir Bjarnason and Aron Gunnarsson are Iceland's joint all-time most capped players with 113 appearances.

Rank	Player	Caps	Goals	Career
1	Birkir Bjarnason	113	15	2010–2022
1	Aron Gunnarsson	113	5	2008–2026
3	Rúnar Kristinsson	104	3	1987–2004
4	Birkir Már Sævarsson	103	3	2007–2021
5	Jóhann Berg Guðmundsson	102	8	2008–2026
6	Ragnar Sigurðsson	97	5	2007–2020
7	**Gylfi Sigurðsson**	92	28	2010–present
8	Kári Árnason	90	6	2005–2021
9	Hermann Hreiðarsson	89	5	1996–2011
10	Eiður Guðjohnsen	88	26	1996–2016

=== Top goalscorers ===
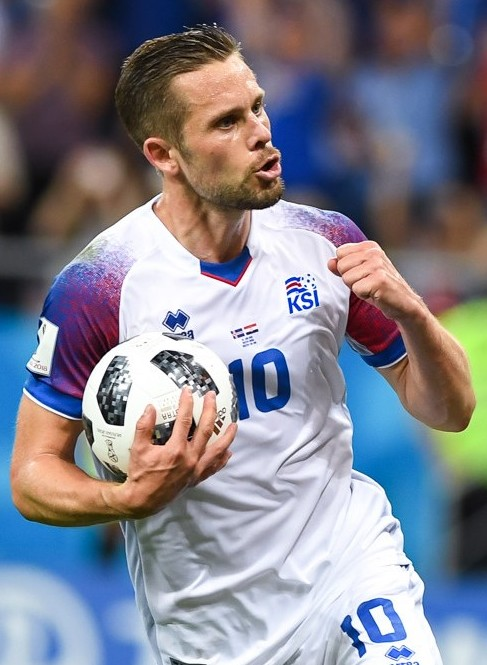
Gylfi Sigurðsson is Iceland's all-time top scorer with 28 goals.

Rank	Player	Goals	Caps	Ratio	Career
1	**Gylfi Sigurðsson**	28	92	0.3	2010–present
2	Kolbeinn Sigþórsson	26	64	0.41	2010–2021
2	Eiður Guðjohnsen	26	88	0.3	1996–2016
4	Alfreð Finnbogason	18	73	0.25	2010–2023
5	Ríkharður Jónsson	17	33	0.52	1947–1965
6	**Andri Guðjohnsen**	16	45	0.36	2021–present
7	Birkir Bjarnason	15	113	0.13	2010–2022
8	Ríkharður Daðason	14	44	0.32	1991–2004
8	**Albert Guðmundsson**	14	49	0.29	2017–present
8	Arnór Guðjohnsen	14	73	0.19	1979–1997

== Competitive record ==
=== FIFA World Cup ===
FIFA World Cup record										Qualification record					
Year	Round	Position	Pld	W	D	L	GF	GA	Squad	Pld	W	D	L	GF	GA
(Uruguay) 1930 to (Brazil) 1950	Not a FIFA member									Not a FIFA member					
(Switzerland) 1954	Did not enter									Did not enter					
(Sweden) 1958	Did not qualify									4	0	0	4	6	26
(Chile) 1962	Did not enter									Did not enter					
(England) 1966	Did not enter									Did not enter					
(Mexico) 1970	Did not enter									Did not enter					
(West Germany) 1974	Did not qualify									6	0	0	6	2	29
(Argentina) 1978	Did not qualify									6	1	0	5	2	12
(Spain) 1982	Did not qualify									8	2	2	4	10	21
(Mexico) 1986	Did not qualify									6	1	0	5	4	10
(Italy) 1990	Did not qualify									8	1	4	3	6	11
(United States) 1994	Did not qualify									8	3	2	3	7	6
(France) 1998	Did not qualify									10	2	3	5	11	16
(South Korea) (Japan) 2002	Did not qualify									10	4	1	5	14	20
(Germany) 2006	Did not qualify									10	1	1	8	14	27
(South Africa) 2010	Did not qualify									8	1	2	5	7	13
(Brazil) 2014	Did not qualify									12	5	3	4	17	17
(Russia) 2018	Group stage	28th	3	0	1	2	2	5	Squad	10	7	1	2	16	7
(Qatar) 2022	Did not qualify									10	2	3	5	12	18
(Canada) (Mexico) (United States) 2026	Did not qualify									6	2	1	3	13	11
(Morocco) (Portugal) (Spain) 2030	To be determined									To be determined					
(Saudi Arabia) 2034	To be determined									To be determined					
Total	Group stage	1/19	3	0	1	2	2	5	—	122	32	23	67	141	244

List of FIFA World Cup matches
Year	Round	Opponent	Score	Result	Date	Venue
2018	Group D	Argentina	1–1	Draw	16 June 2018	Moscow, Russia
2018	Group D	Nigeria	0–2	Loss	22 June 2018	Volgograd, Russia
2018	Group D	Croatia	1–2	Loss	26 June 2018	Rostov-on-Don, Russia

=== UEFA European Championship ===
UEFA European Championship record										Qualifying record					
Year	Round	Position	Pld	W	D	L	GF	GA	Squad	Pld	W	D	L	GF	GA
(France) 1960	Did not enter									Did not enter					
(Spain) 1964	Did not qualify									2	0	1	1	3	5
(Italy) 1968	Did not enter									Did not enter					
(Belgium) 1972	Did not enter									Did not enter					
(Socialist Federal Republic of Yugoslavia) 1976	Did not qualify									6	1	2	3	3	8
(Italy) 1980	Did not qualify									8	0	0	8	2	21
(France) 1984	Did not qualify									8	1	1	6	3	13
(West Germany) 1988	Did not qualify									8	2	2	4	4	14
(Sweden) 1992	Did not qualify									8	2	0	6	7	10
(England) 1996	Did not qualify									8	1	2	5	3	12
(Belgium) (Netherlands) 2000	Did not qualify									10	4	3	3	12	7
(Portugal) 2004	Did not qualify									8	4	1	3	11	9
(Austria) (Switzerland) 2008	Did not qualify									12	2	2	8	10	27
(Poland) (Ukraine) 2012	Did not qualify									8	1	1	6	6	14
(France) 2016	Quarter-finals	8th	5	2	2	1	8	9	Squad	10	6	2	2	17	6
(Europe) 2020	Did not qualify									12	7	1	4	17	14
(Germany) 2024	Did not qualify									12	4	1	7	22	19
(United Kingdom) (Republic of Ireland) 2028	To be determined									To be determined					
(Italy) (Turkey) 2032	To be determined									To be determined					
Total	Quarter-finals	1/14	5	2	2	1	8	9	–	110	35	19	66	120	179

List of UEFA European Championship matches
Year	Round	Opponent	Score	Result	Date	Venue
2016	Group F	Portugal	1–1	Draw	14 June 2016	Saint-Étienne, France
2016	Group F	Hungary	1–1	Draw	18 June 2016	Marseille, France
2016	Group F	Austria	2–1	Win	22 June 2016	Paris, France
2016	Round of 16	England	2–1	Win	27 June 2016	Nice, France
2016	Quarter- finals	France	2–5	Loss	3 July 2016	Paris, France

=== UEFA Nations League ===
UEFA Nations League record
Season	Division	Group	Pld	W	D	L	GF	GA	P/R	Rank
2018–19	A	2	4	0	0	4	1	13	Same position	12th
2020–21	A	2	6	0	0	6	3	17	▼	16th
2022–23	B	2	4	0	4	0	6	6	Same position	23rd
2024–25	B	4	8	2	1	5	12	18	▼	27th
2026–27	C	4	6	4	2	0	15	2	▲	35th
Total			28	6	7	15	37	56	12th	

== Honours ==
=== Regional ===
- Nordic Football Championship
  - Runners-up (1): 2000-01
- Baltic Cup
  - Champions (1): 2022

=== Friendly ===
- Greenland Cup
  - Champions (2): 1980, 1984
- China Cup
  - Runners-up (1): 2017

== FIFA ranking history ==
1992	1993	1994	1995	1996	1997	1998	1999	2000	2001	2002	2003	2004	2005	2006	2007	2008	2009	2010	2011	2012	2013	2014	2015	2016	2017	2018	2019	2020	2021	2022	2023	2024
46	47	39	50	60	72	64	43	50	52	58	58	93	94	93	90	83	92	112	104	90	49	33	36	21	22	37	39	46	62	63	71	70

== See also ==
- Iceland men's national under-21 football team
- Iceland men's national under-19 football team
- Iceland men's national under-17 football team
- Iceland national futsal team
- Iceland women's national football team
