= Icelandic basketball league system =

- Country: Iceland
- Sport: Basketball
- Promotion and relegation: Yes

National system
- Federation: Icelandic Basketball Association
- Confederation: FIBA Europe
- Top division: Úrvalsdeild karla (men); Úrvalsdeild kvenna (women)
- Second division: 1. deild karla (men); 1. deild kvenna (women)
- Cup competition: Cups: Icelandic Men's Cup; Icelandic Women's Cup; Supercups: Icelandic Men's Supercup; Icelandic Women's Supercup

The Icelandic basketball league system, or Icelandic basketball league pyramid, is a series of interconnected competitions for basketball clubs in Iceland. The system has a hierarchical format with a promotion and demotion system between competitions at different levels.

== Men ==
There are currently four different competitions on the pyramid - the 1st tier Úrvalsdeild, the 2nd tier Division I, the 3rd tier Division II, and the 4th tier Division III.

The leagues are organized by the Icelandic Basketball Association.

=== The tier levels ===
For the 2020–21 season, the Icelandic basketball league system is as follows:

Level	League
1	Úrvalsdeild karla 12 teams ↓ 2 relegation (previously 1. deild karla (1951–78))
2	1. deild karla 12 teams^{1}; ↑ 2 promotion ↓ 1 relegation (previously 2. deild karla (1964–78))
3	2. deild karla 10 teams; ↑ 1 promotion ↓ 2 relegation (previously 3. deild karla (1973–78))
4	3. deild karla 7 teams; ↑ 2 promotion

^{1}The 1. deild karla has spot for 12 teams. The 12th placed team is relegated to 2. deild karla. If there are less than 12 teams, no team is relegated.

=== Other competitions ===
- Icelandic Men's Basketball Cup
- Icelandic Men's Basketball Supercup

== Women ==
There are currently three different competitions on the pyramid and they are all organized by the Icelandic Basketball Association.

Level	League
1	Úrvalsdeild kvenna 10 teams ↓ 1 relegation (previously 1. deild kvenna (1952–2005))
2	1. deild kvenna 9 teams^{1}; ↑ 1 promotion (previously 2. deild kvenna (1984–2005))
2	2. deild kvenna TBD

^{1}Registered for the 2022–23 season. The number of teams vary by seasons.

=== Other competitions ===
- Icelandic Women's Basketball Cup
- Icelandic Women's Basketball Supercup

== See also ==
- League system
- European professional club basketball system
- Polish basketball league system
- Greek basketball league system
- Italian basketball league system
- French basketball league system
- Russian basketball league system
- Turkish basketball league system
- German basketball league system
- Hungarian basketball league system
- South American professional club basketball system
