= Tómas Steindórsson =

Icelandic entertainer, social media celebrity and basketball player

- Born: 24 April 1991 (age 35); Hella, Iceland
- Other name: Tommi Steindórs
- Known for: Tommi Steindórs on X977
- Children: 1
- Basketball career

Career information
- Playing career: 2011–2021
- Position: Power forward / center
- Number: 15

Career history
- 2011–2012: Breiðablik
- 2015–2018: Gnúpverjar
- 2018–2019: Breiðablik-b
- 2019: Breiðablik
- 2020–2021: Leiknir Reykjavík

Career highlights
- 2× 3. deild karla (2016, 2019)

Tómas Steindórsson (born 24 April 1991) is an Icelandic radio host, entertainer, social media celebrity and basketball player. He is currently a radio host at X-977 where he hosts the morning show Tommi Steindórs and co-hosts the basketball show Boltinn lýgur ekki with Sigurður Orri Kristjánsson. In 2021, he debuted as an analyst on the postgame basketball TV show Körfuboltakvöld.

== Early life ==
Tómas was born and raised in Hella, Iceland, before moving to Reykjavík to attend college at the age of 20. He played football for several years, appearing in over 50 matches in the Icelandic leagues.

== Basketball career ==
Tómas played his first senior team games with Breiðablik during the 2011–2012 season. He played for Gnúpverjar from 2015 to 2018, helping the team move rapidly up the Icelandic basketball league pyramid, winning Division III in its ignaural season in 2016 and finishing second in Division II in 2017 and achieving promotion to Division I. In February 2019, he was called up to Breiðablik's main squad in the top-tier Úrvalsdeild karla after playing for its B-team. He appeared in three games, averaging 3.0 points and 6.3 rebounds with his best performance coming in a loss against Keflavík where he grabbed 10 rebounds in 12 minutes. In September 2020, Tómas signed with Leiknir Reykjavík.

== Personal life ==
In 2019, Tómas had his first child with partner and Icelandic entertainer Margrét Erla Maack.
