= KV (men's basketball) =

Knattspyrnufélag Vesturbæjar
- Leagues: 2. deild karla
- History: KV (2007–present)
- Arena: Meistaravellir
- Location: Reykjavík, Iceland
- Team colors: white, pink
- Affiliation: KR
- Championships: 1 2. deild
Home	Away

The KV men's basketball team is the men's basketball department of Knattspyrnufélag Vesturbæjar and is based in Reykjavík, Iceland.

== History ==
KV's basketball department was founded in 2007 and its men's team first played in the Icelandic basketball league system during the 2010-2011 2. deild karla season. It finished as the runner-up in the 2. deild in 2016 and 2018. Prior to the 2018–2019 season, the team became affiliated with Úrvalsdeild karla club KR with KR's assistant coach, Arnoldas Kuncaitis, taking the reign of the team. After the 2019–20 season ended prematurely due to the coronavirus pandemic in Iceland, KV was offered the vacant seat in the second-tier 1. deild karla as the team had the best record of the non-reserve teams in the league at the time of the cancelation. After initially accepting the offer, they rescinded their decision a month later and the vacant seat went to Hrunamenn.

== Coaching history ==
- (Iceland) Tómas Þórsson 2010–2011
- (Iceland) Aron Ívarsson 2011–2012
- (Iceland) Bjarki Þór Alexandersson 2012–2013
- (Iceland) Aron Ívarsson 2013–2014
- (Iceland) Gylfi Björnsson 2014–2015
- (Iceland) Aron Ívarsson 2015–2017
- (Iceland) Jens Guðmundsson 2017–2019
- (Lithuania) Arnoldas Kuncaitis 2019–2020
- (Iceland) Veigar Helgason 2022–2023

== Honours ==
- 2. deild karla:
  - Winner: (1) 2024
  - Runner-up: (2) 2016, 2018
