= Pétur Már Sigurðsson =

Icelandic basketball player and coach

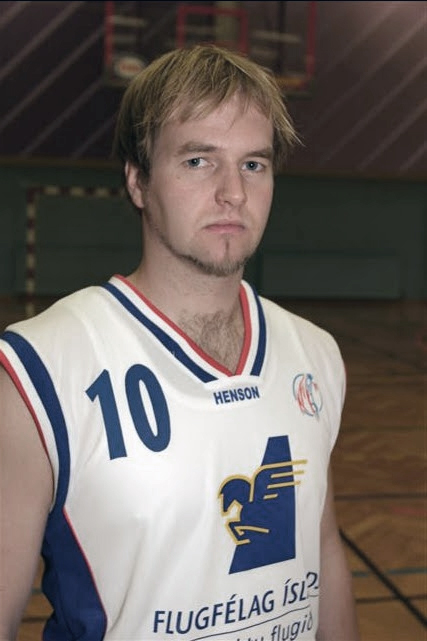
- Pétur Már in 2004 as a member of KFÍ.

Grindavík
- Title: Head coach
- League: Úrvalsdeild kvenna

Personal information
- Born: 15 April 1978 (age 48)
- Listed height: 185 cm (6 ft 1 in)
- Listed weight: 95 kg (209 lb)

Career information
- Playing career: 1994–2018
- Position: Guard / forward
- Number: 10
- Coaching career: 2009–present

Career history

Playing
- 1994–1996: Valur
- 1996–2000: KFÍ
- 2000–2001: Valur
- 2001–2002: Þór Akureyri
- 2002–2003: Skallagrímur
- 2003–2005: KFÍ
- 2005–2008: Skallagrímur
- 2008–2011: Laugdælir
- 2011–2012: Bolungarvík
- 2013–2014: Afturelding
- 2014: Fjölnir
- 2014–2015: Afturelding
- 2015–2016: KFÍ-b
- 2019: Vestri-b

Coaching
- 2009–2011: Laugdælir (M)
- 2011–2013: KFÍ (M)
- 2011–2013: KFÍ (W)
- 2011–2014: Iceland MNT (assistant)
- 2013: Iceland MNT
- 2013–2015: Fjölnir (W)
- 2015–2016: Stjarnan (Men's, assistant)
- 2016–2019: Stjarnan (W)
- 2018–2019: Iceland U-20 WNT
- 2019–2024: Vestri (M)
- 2020–2022: Vestri (W)
- 2024–2026: Skallagrímur (M)
- 2024–2026: Grindavík (W)

Career highlights
- As player: Division II champion (2010); As coach: Men's Division I champion (2012); Men's Division II champion (2010)

Career Úrvalsdeild karla statistics
- Points: 2,314 (9.0 ppg)
- Rebounds: 342 (1.3 apg)
- Assists: 362 (1.4 apg)
Medals
Head Coach for Iceland
Games of the Small States of Europe
| Bronze medal – third place | 2013 Luxembourg | National Team |

Pétur Már Sigurðsson (born 15 April 1978) is an Icelandic professional basketball coach and a former player. He coached the men's national team during the 2013 Games of the Small States of Europe in the absence of Peter Öqvist. The team finished third with two wins and two losses.

== Career ==
Pétur helped Skallagrímur reach the 2006 Úrvalsdeild finals, scoring 21 points in the fourth and deciding game against defending champions Keflavík in the semi-finals. In the finals, Skallagrímur lost 1-3 to Njarðvík.

Pétur turned became a player-coach for Laugdælir in 2009. In 2010 he led them to a perfect 16-0 season, while also going 5-0 in the playoffs, the Division II championship and promotion to Division I. Despite not fielding a foreign player, his squad managed to stave off relegation during the 2010–2011 Division I season and reach the final eight of the Icelandic Basketball Cup. After the season Pétur was hired as the head coach of KFÍ. In his first season he led KFÍ's men's to the Division I championship and promotion to the Úrvalsdeild karla, while also reaching the final four in the Icelandic Basketball Cup where they lost to eventual champions Keflavík. After a 10th-place finish in the 2011-2012 season, where the club staved off relegation with a victory in their last game, Pétur left KFÍ when his contract was not renewed.

In May 2015, Pétur was hired as an assistant coach to Stjarnan men's team. In 2016, Stjarnan hired him as the head coach of the women's team On 13 February 2019, Pétur Már guided Stjarnan women's team to the Icelandic Cup finals for the first time in the club's history, after a 103-82 victory against Breiðablik in the semi-finals.

In June 2019, the board of Stjarnan announced that it would withdraw the women's team from the Úrvalsdeild kvenna and register it for the second-tier 1. deild kvenna instead due to several key players leaving the team. Shortly later, Pétur left the team and signed with Vestri.

In June 2021, Pétur guided Vestri back to the Úrvalsdeild after the team defeated Hamar in the 1. deild promotion finals. In July 2021 he left his post as head coach of Vestri's women's team to fully focus on coaching the men's team.

In May 2024, he was hired as the coach of Skallagrímur men's team. He stepped down in March 2026.

In May 2026, Pétur was hired as the head coach of Grindavík women's team.

=== National team record ===
Pétur coached the men's national team during the 2013 Games of the Small States of Europe. The team finished third with two wins and two losses.

| Year | Games | Wins | Losses | % |
|---|---|---|---|---|
| 2013 | 4 | 2 | 2 | 50% |
| Career | 4 | 2 | 2 | 50% |

On 1 December 2018, Pétur was announced as the head coach of the Icelandic women's national under-20 basketball team.
