= Clayton Ladine =

American-French basketball player

Sindri Höfn
- Position: Point guard
- League: 1. deild karla

Personal information
- Born: 30 July 1998 (age 28) San Francisco, California, U.S.
- Listed height: 6 ft 2 in (1.88 m)

Career information
- High school: Phillip & Sala Burton (San Francisco, California)
- College: Skyline (2016–2018); Rocky Mountain (2018–2020)
- NBA draft: 2020: undrafted
- Playing career: 2020–present

Career history
- 2020–2021: Sorgues BC
- 2021–2022: Hrunamenn
- 2022–2023: Breiðablik
- 2023: Kordall Steelers
- 2023–2024: Iserlohn Kangaroos
- 2024–2025: Flexachem KCYMS Killorglin
- 2025–present: Sindri Höfn

Career highlights
- 1. deild karla assist leader (2022)

Clayton Riggs Ladine is an American-French professional basketball player for Sindri Höfn of the Icelandic 1. deild karla. He played college basketball for Skyline College and Rocky Mountain College before turning professional in 2020.

== High school career ==
Ladine played basketball for Phillip & Sala Burton High School where he averaged 32.3 points in two seasons. He was coached by his father Clinton Ladine, a former professional basketball player.

== College career ==
Ladine started his college career with Skyline College, a community college in San Bruno, California, where he played two seasons. In 2018, he transferred to Rocky Mountain College where he averaged 13.6 points, 6.1 rebounds and 5.3 assists during his senior season.

== Professional career ==
In December 2020, Ladine signed with Sorgues BC of the French Nationale Masculine 2 (NM2). In July 2021, Ladine signed with Hrunamenn of the Icelandic 1. deild karla. On 24 March 2022, he scored a season high 40 points in a victory against Hamar. For the season, he averaged 23.9 points, 5.9 rebounds and league leading 8.1 assists per game.

The following season, Ladine signed with Breiðablik of the Icelandic Úrvalsdeild karla. In his first Úrvalsdeild game, he had 20 points, 7 rebounds and 8 assists in a win against Þór Þorlákshöfn. For the season, he averaged 9.5 points, 3.8 rebounds and 3.3 assists.

Ladine signed with German ProB side Iserlohn Kangaroos in October 2023.

In June 2025, Ladine signed with Sindri Höfn in Iceland.

== Personal life ==
Ladine's sister is basketball player Elle Ladine. Ladine's uncles are former professional players Bobby Ladine and Matt Ladine (AKA-'Big Cheese'). .
