= Dee Franklin =

American basketball player

BC Metz
- Position: Small forward
- League: NM2

Personal information
- Born: August 15, 1992 (age 34) Birmingham, Alabama
- Listed height: 6 ft 5 in (1.96 m)

Career information
- College: Belhaven (2013–2014); Fort Valley State (2014–2017)
- NBA draft: 2017: undrafted
- Playing career: 2018–present

Career history
- 2018–2019: Randers Cimbria
- 2019–2020: KB Kalaja
- 2019: CB Valdivia
- 2020–2021: BMS Herlev Wolfpack
- 2021–2022: Hamar
- 2023-2024: BC Metz Conniers

Career highlights
- Chilean Supercup winner (2019)

Dareial Corrione Franklin (born August 15, 1992) is an American professional basketball player who is currently playing for the BC Metz Conniers of the FFBB NM2.

== Professional career ==
After going undrafted in the 2017 NBA draft, Franklin has agreed to a deal with the Danish team, Randers Cimbria, for the 2018–19 season. In his first ever professional game, he recorded 21 points and 4 rebounds in an 81–95 loss to Horsens IC. He followed up his performance with 19 points, 5 rebounds and 2 steals to notch their first victory for the season as they defeated the EBAA, 101–90.

In 2021, Franklin agreed to a deal with Hamar of the Icelandic second-tier 1. deild karla. In his first game with Hamar, Franklin recorded 26 points and 8 rebounds in a 71–86 losing effort to Álftanes.
