= Laugdælir =

Ungmennafélag Laugdæla
- Nickname: Laugdælir
- Founded: 5 March 1908; 118 years ago
- Location: Laugarvatn, Iceland
- Arena: Íþróttahúsið á Laugarvatni
- Colors: Orange, Black

Ungmennafélag Laugdæla, commonly known as Laugdælir, is a sports club located at Laugarvatn in the southern part of Iceland. It was founded on 5 March 1908.

== Basketball ==
Laugdælir
- Founded: 1975; 51 years ago
- History: Laugdælir; 1975–2002; Selfoss/Laugdælir; 2002–2003; Laugdælir; 2003–2016; Hrunamenn/Laugdælir; 2016–2017; Laugdælir; 2017–present
- Arena: Íþróttahúsið á Laugarvatni
- Location: Laugarvatn, Iceland
- Team colors: Orange, Black
Home	Away

=== Men´s basketball ===
==== Recent history ====
In March 1983, Laugdælir finished first in its group in 2. deild karla and played KFÍ, Breiðablik and Íþróttafélag Menntaskólans á Egilsstöðum (ÍME) in they playoffs for the 2. deild championship and promotion to 1. deild karla. According to the rules at the time, each team would play the other three once and the team with the best win-loss record would be crowned champions. Laugdælir won two out of three games and finished tied with KFÍ and Breiðablik. As the rules did not count for any tie-breakers, the three teams were slated to meet again to decide the winner. During the second try, KFÍ lost to Breiðablik in the first game, 78–77, but won Laugdælir in the second game 79–76. Laugdælir however won Breiðablik leaving the teams again tied, thus meaning that a third playoff would be held to decide the winner. During the third playoff, KFÍ won Breiðablik but lost to Laugdælir. As Breiðablik won Laugdælir the teams were once again tied. Prior to the fourth playoffs, the Icelandic Basketball Federation decided that if the teams would once again finish tied, the team with the best scoring record would finish first. The fourth playoff was held from 30 April to 2 May and there Laugdælir won both KFÍ and Breiðablik convincingly and were crowned 2. deild karla champions.

In 2016 they finished with the best record in Division III but lost to Gnúpverjar in the D3 finals. They still achieved promotion to Division II.

In 2016-2017 they had a joint team with neighbouring club Hrunamenn and posted the best record in Division II and defeated Gnúpverjar in the D2 Finals, claiming the Division II championship and a promotion to Division I.

Laugdælir is the team that has won the most Division II championships (4).

==== Trophies ====
- Icelandic Second Division (4):
  - 1975-76, 1982–83, 2009–10, 2016-17^{1}

^{1}As Laugdælir/Hrunamenn, a joint team with Hrunamenn

==== Notable players ====
  - (Iceland) Baldur Ingi Jónasson
  - (Iceland) Fannar Ólafsson
  - (Iceland) Pétur Már Sigurðsson

==== Notable coaches ====
  - (Iceland) (Russia) Alexander Ermolinskij 2002–2003
  - (Iceland) Pétur Már Sigurðsson 2009–2011
  - (North Macedonia) Florijan Jovanov 2022–2023

=== Women's basketball ===
Laugdælir women's team participated in the top-tier 1. deild kvenna during the 1981–1982 season.

==== Notable players ====
Criteria

To appear in this section a player must have either:

- Played at least three seasons for the club.
- Set a club record or won an individual award while at the club.
- Played at least one official international match for their national team at any time.
- Played at least one official WNBA match at any time.

- (Iceland) Dagbjört Dögg Karlsdóttir
- (Iceland) Sigríður Guðjónsdóttir
