= Viðar Örn Hafsteinsson =

Icelandic basketball player and coach (born 1985)

Höttur
- Title: Head coach
- League: Úrvalsdeild karla

Personal information
- Born: 6 May 1985 (age 41) Egilsstaðir, Iceland
- Listed height: 190 cm (6 ft 3 in)
- Listed weight: 82 kg (181 lb)

Career information
- Playing career: 1999–2018
- Position: Guard
- Coaching career: 2011–present

Career history

Playing
- 1999–2007: Höttur
- 2007–2008: Hamar
- 2008–2009: Laugdælir
- 2009–2010: Hamar
- 2010–2015: Höttur
- 2016–2018: Höttur

Coaching
- 2011–present: Höttur
- 2017–2018: Iceland U-18

Career highlights
- As player: 2x 1. deild karla (2015, 2017); As head coach: 3x 1. deild karla (2015, 2017, 2020); 2x 1. deild karla Coach of the Year (2015, 2017)

Viðar Örn Hafsteinsson (born 17 June 1986) is an Icelandic basketball coach and former player. He has been the head coach Höttur since 2011.

== Playing career ==
Viðar spent the majority of his career with Höttur and was a key player for the club when it was promoted to the Úrvalsdeild for the first time in 2005. He averaged 13.7 points per game in his first Úrvalsdeild season. After averaging 17.9 points in 2006–2007, he signed with Hamar the following season. In 2009, he signed with Laugdælir, where he averaged 18.3 points, but returned to Hamar after the season.

== Coaching career ==
In 2011, Viðar was hired as the head coach of Höttur. He guided to team to the Úrvalsdeild in 2015. In March 2020, Höttur won the 1. deild for the third time under his command after the rest of the season was canceled due to the coronavirus outbreak in Iceland.

== National team career ==
Viðar played for the Icelandic national U-20 team in 2005. He was the head coach of the Icelandic national U-18 team from 2017 to 2018.
