= German basketball league system =

The German basketball league system or German basketball league pyramid is a series of interconnected competitions for professional basketball clubs in Germany. The system has a hierarchical format, with a promotion and demotion system between competitions at different levels. There are currently six different competitions on the pyramid: the 1st-tier level for men is the Basketball Bundesliga (BBL), and for the Damen Basketball Bundesliga (DBBL) for the women. The 2nd-tier level for men ProA and the 2. Damen Basketball Bundesliga (2. DBBL), the 3rd-tier level ProB, the 4th-tier level 1. Regionalliga, the 5th-tier level 2. Regionalliga, and the 6th-tier level Landesliga Oberliga.

== The male tier pyramid ==
Level	League
1	Basketball Bundesliga (BBL); National 1st Division (18 teams)
2	2. Basketball Bundesliga; National 2nd Division; (1975–2007)
2	ProA; National 2nd Division (2007–present) (18 teams)
3	ProB; National 3rd Division (2007–present) (29 teams in two groups, North 14 teams and South 15 teams)
4	1. Regionalliga; National 4th Division; (53 teams in 4 groups)
5	2. Regionalliga; National 5th Division; (112 teams in 9 groups)
6	Landesliga Oberliga; National 6th Division (218 teams in 13 groups)

== The female tier pyramid ==
Level	League
1	Damen Basketball Bundesliga (DBBL); National 1st Division (10 teams)
2	2. Damen Basketball Bundesliga; National 2nd Division; (25 teams in two groups, North 13 teams and South 12 teams)
3	1. Regionalliga; National 3rd Division; (53 teams in 4 groups)
4	2. Regionalliga; National 4th Division; (112 teams in 9 groups)
5	Landesliga Oberliga; National 5th Division (218 teams in 13 groups)

== Other competitions ==
- German Cup
- German Women's Cup
- German Super Cup

== See also ==
- League system
- European professional club basketball system
- Spanish basketball league system
- Greek basketball league system
- Italian basketball league system
- French basketball league system
- Russian basketball league system
- Turkish basketball league system
- Serbian basketball league system
- Polish basketball league system
- Hungarian basketball league system
- South American professional club basketball system
