= Patrekur =

Körfuknattleiksfélagið Patrekur
- Founded: 2010
- Folded: 2016
- History: Patrekur (2010–2016)
- Arena: Smárinn
- Team colors: Blue, white
Home	Away

Körfuknattleiksfélagið Patrekur was a basketball club in Reykjavík, Iceland. They played their home games in Smárinn in Kópavogur.

== Seasons ==
Results of league and cup competitions by season
Season	Division	P	W	L	PTS	F	A	Pos	Playoffs	Icelandic Cup
Season	League								Playoffs	Icelandic Cup
2010-2011	2. deild Group A	14	10	4	20	1202	1069	3rd	R1	R2
2011-2012	2. deild Group A	16	10	6	20	1124	1081	3rd	N/A	R2
2012-2013	2. deild Group B	14	2	12	4	850	1025	8th	N/A	N/A
2013-2014	2. deild Group A	12	1	11	2	739	838	7th	N/A	N/A
2014-2015	2. deild Group A	14	2	12	4	984	1112	8th	N/A	N/A
2015-2016	3. deild	13	7	6	14	755	718	8th	N/A	N/A
