= Reggie Dupree =

American-Icelandic basketball player

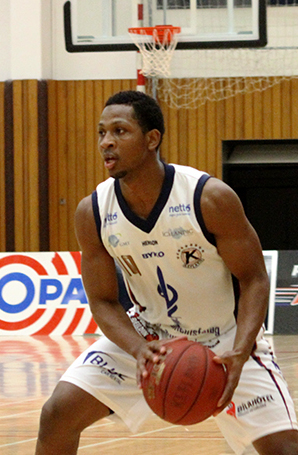
- Dupree in 2014.

Personal information
- Born: 10 December 1987 (age 38) United States
- Listed height: 6 ft 0 in (1.83 m)

Career information
- College: Faulkner
- Playing career: 2012–2022
- Position: Point guard / shooting guard

Career history
- 2012–2014: Reynir Sandgerði
- 2014–2022: Keflavík

Reginald Keil Dupree (born 10 December 1987) is an American-Icelandic former basketball player.

== Club career ==
Dupree started his career with Reynir Sandgerði in the 1. deild karla. During the 2012–13 season, he averaged 20.5 points and 5.2 rebounds per game. In 2014, he signed with Keflavík. As the rules at the time only allowed one non-EU player on the court, he played sparingly, averaging 4.4 points in 10.1 minutes per game. The following summer, Dupree received an Icelandic citizenship and as a result his playing time and performance increased with his averages jumping to 11.4 points in 29.5 minutes per game while shooting a career high 48.9% from the three point line.

In October 2016, Dupree was ejected from a game against Stjarnan after a minor confrontation with Justin Shouse ended with Dupree throwing Shouse's headband up to the stands.

After starting the 2017–18 season slow due to injuries, he exploded for a season high 29 points in a victory against Haukar on 26 October 2017. For the season he averaged 11.0 points while shooting 40.7% from the three point line.
