= Russian basketball league system =

Hierarchical league system for professional basketball clubs in Russia

The Russian basketball league system is a hierarchical league system for professional basketball clubs in Russia, with promotion and relegation between different levels of competition. There are currently five levels of competition: the VTB United League, the Russian Super League 1, the Russian Super League 2, the Russian Super League 3 and the Under-23 Youth League.

== The tier pyramid ==
Level	League
1.	VTB United League (12 teams - 10 from Russia, 1 from Belarus and 1 from Kazakhstan) (Current) (Russian Professional Basketball League (PBL) - defunct) (2010–2013) (Soviet Union Premier League - defunct) (1923–1992)
2.	Russian Super League 1 (First Tier from 1992 to 2010) (13 teams)
3.	Russian Super League 2 (11 teams)
4.	Russian Super League 3 (9 teams)
5.	Under–23 Youth League (10 teams)

== Other competitions ==
- Russian Cup
- Soviet Union Cup

== See also ==
- League system
- European professional club basketball system
- Spanish basketball league system
- Greek basketball league system
- Italian basketball league system
- French basketball league system
- Turkish basketball league system
- German basketball league system
- Serbian basketball league system
- Polish basketball league system
- Hungarian basketball league system
- South American professional club basketball system
