= Justin Shouse =

American-Icelandic basketball player and coach

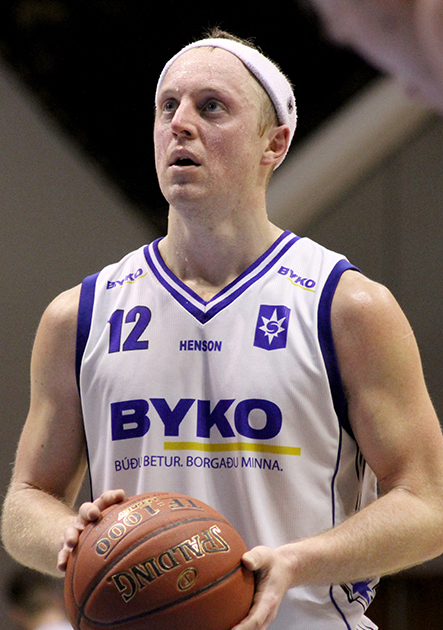
- Justin Shouse with Stjarnan in 2015.

Personal information
- Born: June 16, 1981 (age 45) Erie, Pennsylvania, U.S.
- Listed height: 6 ft 0 in (1.83 m)

Career information
- High school: McDowell (Millcreek, Pennsylvania, U.S.)
- College: Mercyhurst (2000–2004)
- Playing career: 2004–2017
- Position: Point guard
- Coaching career: 2005–present

Career history

Playing
- 2004–2005: Bergheim Bandits
- 2005–2006: Drangur
- 2006–2008: Snæfell
- 2008–2017: Stjarnan

Coaching
- 2005–2006: Drangur (men's)
- 2007–2008: Snæfell (women's)
- 2017–2018: Stjarnan (men's, assistant)
- 2019–2020: Álftanes (men's, assistant)

Career highlights
- As player: 2× Úrvalsdeild Domestic Player of the year (2012, 2013); Úrvalsdeild Foreign Player of the year (2010); 2× Úrvalsdeild Domestic All-First team (2012, 2013); Icelandic Cup Finals MVP (2015); 4× Icelandic Cup (2008, 2009, 2013, 2015); Icelandic Supercup (2009); No. 12 retired by Stjarnan; As coach: Icelandic Women's Division I champion (2008)

Career Úrvalsdeild karla statistics
- Points: 4,606 (20.0 ppg)
- Assists: 1,486 (6.5 apg)
- Games: 230
Medals
Men's basketball
Representing Iceland
Games of the Small States of Europe
Bronze medal – third place	2013 Luxembourg	National Team

Justin Christopher Shouse (born 16 September 1981) is an American and Icelandic former basketball player and coach. He won the Icelandic Cup four times and was named the Cup Finals MVP in 2015. He was named the Úrvalsdeild Foreign Player of the year in 2010 and, after becoming a naturalized Icelandic citizen, he was named the Úrvalsdeild Domestic Player of the year in 2012 and 2013. He retired in 2017 as the Úrvalsdeild's all-time leader in assists, a record he held until January 2024 when it was broken by Hörður Axel Vilhjálmsson.

== High school career ==
From 1997 to 2000, Shouse played in 109 games for the McDowell Trojans of Erie, Pa. As a junior (1998–99), Shouse led McDowell to a 26–5 record including a 52–48 overtime win over nationally ranked New Castle on their way to the school's only state final appearance. McDowell would lose the 1999 4A State Final 64–40 to Williamsport. During the 1999–2000 season, McDowell, led by Shouse and J.J. Delsandro, amassed a record of 27-0 and was ranked #1 in Pennsylvania before being upset by Uniontown in the 2000 PIAA 4A Elite Eight. Uniontown would go on to the lose the 4A State Final to Chester.

Shouse finished his career as McDowell's leading scorer with 1340 career points (12.3 ppg). That record would be broken by Sean Smiley in 2005.

== College career ==
Shouse played college basketball for Mercyhurst University from 2000 to 2004. He played a total 108 games, all starts, averaging 13.0 points, 3.3 rebounds, 5 assists and 2.4 steals. He was selected to the All-GLIAC Defensive Team three times and was named to the First-Team All-GLIAC nod as a senior. In 2011 he was inducted into the schools Hall of Fame.

== Professional career ==
=== Germany ===
Shouse started his professional career with the Bergheim Bandits of the German Regional league in 2004 where he averaged 22.5 points, 5.0 rebounds, 6.0 assists and 2.5 steals per game.

=== Iceland ===
In 2005 Shouse joined Drangur in the Icelandic Division I as a player-coach. For the season he averaged 37.7 points per game while the team finished 6–12, good for 8th-place finish.

After one season in Division I, Shouse joined Úrvalsdeild powerhouse Snæfell in 2006. He played there for two seasons, winning the Icelandic Basketball Cup and the Icelandic Company Cup in 2008 while losing in the National Finals the same year.

In 2008 he signed with Úrvalsdeild club Stjarnan. Since joining the club he has won the Icelandic Basketball Cup three times and the Supercup and Company Cup once each. He was twice selected domestic player of the year (2012, 2013) and once the foreign player of the year (2010). In 2015, he was named as the Icelandic Cup Finals MVP.

On 19 April 2017, Shouse announced his retirement from playing professional basketball.

On 27 January 2019, Stjarnan retired Shouse's number 12 jersey.

On 12 June 2019, Shouse decided to return to basketball, signing with newly promoted 1. deild karla club Álftanes where he met up with his former Stjarnan coach Hrafn Kristjánsson. He however decided to abandon his comeback for health reasons before the start of the season.

== National team career ==
Shouse received an Icelandic citizenship in 2011. He was selected for the Icelandic national basketball team that won bronze in the 2013 Games of the Small States of Europe.

== Coaching career ==
Shouse was a player-coach for Drangur in 2005-2006 and led the team to a 6–12 record in 1. deild karla. In 2008 he led Snæfell women's team to a with a perfect record in the 1. deild kvenna and promotion to Úrvalsdeild kvenna. After his playing career with Stjarnan ended, Shouse served as an assistant coach to Hrafn Kristjánsson at Stjarnan during the 2017–18 Úrvalsdeild season.

== Awards and titles ==
=== Player ===
==== Awards ====
- 2x Úrvalsdeild Domestic Player of the year (2012, 2013)
- Úrvalsdeild Foreign Player of the year (2010)
- 2x Úrvalsdeild Domestic All-First team (2012, 2013)

==== Titles ====
- 4× Icelandic Cup (2008, 2009, 2013, 2015)
- Icelandic Cup MVP: 2015
- 2x Icelandic Company Cup (2008, 2016)
- Icelandic Supercup (2009)

==== Achievements ====
- Úrvalsdeild all-time career assists leader (broken in 2024)
- 2× Úrvalsdeild assist leader (2009, 2012)
- 1. deild karla scoring champion (2006)

=== Coach ===
==== Titles ====
- Icelandic Women's Division I champion (2008)

== Post basketball ==
Following the end of his basketball career, Shouse went in to the restaurant business, opening a chicken wing food truck called The Wing Wagon and later a restaurant in Reykjavík called Just Wingin' it.

== Popular culture ==
- Justin Shouse - Kjúklingur og körfubolti (English: Justin Shouse - Chicken and basketball) is a 2020 documentary Shouse's life and basketball career.
