= Greek basketball league system =

Interconnected competitions for professional basketball clubs

- Country: Greece
- Sport: Basketball
- Promotion and relegation: Yes

National system
- Federation: Hellenic Basketball Federation (HBF) & Hellenic Basketball Association (HEBA)
- Confederation: FIBA Europe
- Top division: Greek Basketball League
- Second division: Greek Elite League
- Cup competition: Greek Cup; Greek Super Cup

The Greek basketball league system is a number of interconnected competitions for professional basketball clubs in Greece. The system has a hierarchical format with a promotion and relegation system between competitions at different levels. There are nine different competition levels in the system. The highest level competitions are the professional and semi professional nationwide competitions, which include the top-tier level Greek Basketball League (GBL), the second-tier level Greek A2 Basketball League, the third-tier level Greek B Basketball League, and the fourth-tier level Greek C Basketball League. Those competitions are then followed by the regional amateur level competitions, which include: the A1, the A2, the B, the C, and/or the C1, and the C2 categories.

The top-tier level Greek Basketball League is organized by the Hellenic Basketball Association (HEBA), while all of the league levels below the top-tier are organized by the Hellenic Basketball Federation (HBF).

== Competitions ==
League
Professional Level
HEBA Greek Basketball League (A1)
National 1st Division
(All clubs must be legally licensed, registered, and recognized as fully professional clubs.)
(12 teams)
HBF Greek Elite League (A2)
National 2nd Division
(Clubs don't have to be legally licensed as professional entities. Some are and some are not.)
(16 teams)
HBF Greek National League 1 (B)
National 3rd Division
(36 teams)
(2nd-tier from 1961 to 1986)
Semi Professional Level
HBF Greek National League 2 (C)
National 4th Division
(60 teams)
HBF Amateur Level
ESKAH, ESKAK, EKASKENOP, EKASK, ESKASE, T.E. Chiou, T.E. Lesvou, T.E. Samou, T.E. Dodekanisou, E.S.K. Kikladon, ESKA, ESKANA, ESKABDE, ESKATH, EKASKEM, EKASDYM, EKASAMATH, EKASX
A1 Category
Regional 1st Division
ESKAH, ESKAK, EKASKENOP, EKASK, ESKASE, T.E. Chiou, T.E. Lesvou, T.E. Samou, T.E. Dodekanisou, E.S.K. Kikladon, ESKA, ESKANA, ESKABDE, ESKATH, EKASKEM, EKASDYM, EKASAMATH, EKASX
A2 Category
Regional 2nd Division
ESKAH, ESKAK, EKASKENOP, EKASK, ESKASE, T.E. Chiou, T.E. Lesvou, T.E. Samou, T.E. Dodekanisou, E.S.K. Kikladon, ESKA, ESKANA, ESKABDE, ESKATH, EKASKEM, EKASDYM, EKASAMATH, EKASX
B Category
Regional 3rd Division
ESKAH, ESKAK, EKASKENOP, EKASK, ESKASE, T.E. Chiou, T.E. Lesvou, T.E. Samou, T.E. Dodekanisou, E.S.K. Kikladon, ESKA, ESKANA, ESKABDE, ESKATH, EKASKEM, EKASDYM, EKASAMATH, EKASX
C or C1 Category
Regional 4th Division
ESKAH
C2 Category
Regional 5th Division

== Other competitions ==
- Greek Cup
- Greek Super Cup

== See also ==
- League system
- European professional club basketball system
- Spanish basketball league system
- Italian basketball league system
- French basketball league system
- Russian basketball league system
- Turkish basketball league system
- German basketball league system
- Serbian basketball league system
- Polish basketball league system
- Hungarian basketball league system
- South American professional club basketball system
