= Ungmennafélag Bolungarvíkur =

Multi-sport club based in Bolungarvík, Iceland

- Founded: 1 April 1907; 119 years ago
- Location: Bolungarvík, Iceland
- Colors: Red, blue, white
- Website: umfb.is

Ungmennafélag Bolungarvíkur (Icelandic pronunciation: [ˈuŋkˌmɛnːaˌfjɛːˌlaːɣ ˈpɔːluŋkarˌviːkʏr̥], lit. 'Bolungarvík Youth Club'), also known as simply UMFB or Bolungarvík, is a multi-sport club based in Bolungarvík, Iceland. It was founded on 1 April 1907 and its first chairman was Jóhann Jónsson. During its history it has had departments in basketball, chess, Esports, football, skiing and swimming amongst others.

== Basketball ==
UMFB Basketball
- Founded: 1989
- History: UMFB Basketball (1989–present)
- Arena: Íþróttarmiðstöðin Árbær
- Location: Bolungarvík, Iceland
- Team colors: Red, blue, white
- Championships: 1 Division II (1992)
- Website: UMFB-Basketball.com
Home	Away

=== Men's basketball ===
==== History ====
UMFB's basketball department was founded in 1989. It played in the second-tier 1. deild karla during the 1989–1990 season, finishing 9th. In 1992, it won the 2. deild karla after beating Gnúpverjar in the playoffs. ÍFL had originally defeated UMFB during the group stage of the playoffs and Gnúpverjar in the finals. However, ÍFL had used an illegal player and as an result of an official complaint, UMFB was awarded a 2–0 victory which meant they finished with the best record in their group and faced Gnúpverjar in the finals rematch. It again played in the 1. deild for the 1992–1993 season but finished last and were relegated back to 2. deild.

==== Honours ====
- 2. deild karla (1):
  - 1991-92

==== Head coaches ====
Managers since 1989:

- Guðjón Már Þorsteinsson
- Richard Ray Clark
- Helgi Pálsson 2000–2002
- Sigurður Þ. Stefánsson 2002–2003
- Karl Jónsson 2003–2004
- Birgir Olgeirsson 2004–2005
- Neil Shiran Þórisson 2010, 2011–2012
- Þórir Guðmundsson 2010–2011
- Borce Ilievski 2012

==== Notable players ====
- (Iceland) Baldur Ingi Jónasson
- (Iceland) Birgir Örn Birgisson
- (Iceland) Hjörtur Oddsson
- (Iceland) Jón Oddsson
- (Iceland) Pétur Már Sigurðsson

== Esports ==
=== History ===
In January 2021, UMFB started an Esports department.

== Football ==
=== Men's football ===
==== History ====
From 2006 to 2016, UMFB fielded a joint team with Boltafélag Ísafjarðar, called BÍ/Bolungarvík. In 2008 the team was promoted to 2. deild karla and in 2010 to 1. deild karla. In October 2010 the team hired Guðjón Þórðarson as their manager. In 2016 Boltafélag Ísafjarðar merged into Íþróttafélagið Vestri along with Skellur (Volleyball), Sundfélagið Vestri (Swim) and KFÍ (Basketball).

==== Notable players ====
- (Iceland) Andri Rúnar Bjarnason

=== Women's football ===
==== History ====
UMFB fielded a joint team with Boltafélag Ísafjarðar periodically from 2006 under the name BÍ/Bolungarvík. The team last played during the 2015 season in the second-tier 1. deild kvenna when it fielded a joint team with Íþróttafélag Reykjavíkur under the name ÍR/BÍ/Bolungarvík.
