= Marvin Valdimarsson =

Icelandic basketball player

Personal information
- Born: 11 August 1981 (age 45) Iceland
- Listed height: 198 cm (6 ft 6 in)
- Listed weight: 85 kg (187 lb)

Career information
- Playing career: 1997–2018
- Position: Small forward

Career history
- 1997–2002: UMF Selfoss
- 2002–2005: Hamar
- 2005–2006: Fjölnir
- 2007: Hamar/Selfoss
- 2007–2010: Hamar
- 2010–2018: Stjarnan
- 2018: Ungmennafélag Álftaness

Career highlights
- Icelandic Cup (2013, 2015); Icelandic Company Cup (2015); 1. deild karla (2009); 1. deild karla scoring champion (2009); 1. deild karla Player of the Year (2009)

Marvin Valdimarsson (born 11 August 1981) is an Icelandic former basketball player. At the peak of his career, he was known as a high-scoring forward, leading the 1. deild karla in scoring in 2009, when he was also named as the Player of the Year, and coming in second in scoring in the Úrvalsdeild karla in 2010. After joining Stjarnan in 2010, he won the Icelandic Basketball Cup twice, in 2013 and 2015. In 2015, he won the last edition of the Icelandic Company Cup. He last played for Ungmennafélag Álftaness in 2018.

== Personal life ==
Marvin's brother is basketball player Sæmundur Valdimarsson.

== Honours ==
=== Titles ===
- Icelandic Cup (2013, 2015)
- Icelandic Company Cup (2015)
- 1. deild karla (2009)

=== Awards ===
- 1. deild karla Player of the Year (2009)

=== Achievements ===
- 1. deild karla scoring champion (2009)
