= Everage =

Everage is both a given name and a surname. Notable people with the name include:

- Everage Richardson (born 1985), American-Icelandic basketball player
- Dame Edna Everage

== See also ==
- Average
- Beverage
