= Polish basketball league system =

The Polish basketball league system, or Polish basketball league pyramid is a series of interconnected competitions for professional and amateur basketball clubs in Poland. The system has a hierarchical format with a promotion and relegation system between competitions at different levels.

== Men ==
=== The tier levels ===
For the 2020–21 season, the Polish men's basketball league system is as follows:

Level (Clubs)	League/Division								
1 (16)	Polska Liga Koszykówki (PLK); 16 teams ↓ 2 relegation								
2 (16)	I Liga; 16 teams ↑ 2 promotion ↓ 4 relegation								
3 (51)	II Liga; Group A (North-West); 12 teams			II Liga; Group B (Central-East); 13 teams		II Liga; Group C (South); 13 teams		II Liga; Group D (South-West); 13 teams	
3 (51)	Five rounds of playoffs: ↑ 4 promotion (2 finalists and the winner of the matches for 3rd place); One round of play-out: ↓ 4 relegation (each of the 4 losers)								
4 (78)	III Liga; DZKosz. (DS, LB); 15 teams	III Liga; KOZKosz. (MA, PK); 10 teams	III Liga; KPZKosz. (KP, LD); 6 teams	III Liga; OZKosz. (OP); 7 teams	III Liga; PodkZKosz. (PK, LU); 3 teams	III Liga; POZKosz. (PM, WN); 8 teams	III Liga; SLZKosz. (SL); 7 teams	III Liga; WOZKosz. (MZ); 14 teams	III Liga; WZKosz. (WP); 10 teams
4 (78)	Semi-finals tournaments: 24 best teams from all the groups will qualify for six semi-final's tournaments (the 4 teams in each tournament); Finals tournaments: 12 best teams of the six semi-final's tournaments (2 teams from each semi-final's tournaments) ↑ 6 promotion (2 teams from each final's tournaments)								

== Women ==
=== The tier levels ===
For the 2020–21 season, the Polish women's basketball league system is as follows:

Level (Clubs)	League/Division				
1 (11)	Basket Liga Kobiet (BLK); 11 teams ↓ 0 or 1 relegation [league contract, 12 clubs participating is guaranteed to play provided they meet the conditions of the license (no relegations); exception: the fall in the event of two classes of one of the last places in consecutive seasons]				
2 (20)	I Liga Group A 10 teams			I Liga Group B 10 teams	
2 (20)	Four rounds of playoffs: ↑ 1 promotion (the winner of the final matches); One round of play-out: ↓ 2 relegation (each of the 2 losers)				
3 (34)	II Liga; North Group; 5 teams	II Liga; South Group A 6 teams	II Liga; South Group B 6 teams	II Liga; East Group; 6 teams	II Liga; West Group; 11 teams
3 (34)	Semi-finals tournaments: 8 best teams from all the groups will qualify for two semi-final's tournaments (the 4 teams in each tournament); Finals tournaments: 4 best teams of the two semi-final's tournaments (2 teams from each semi-final's tournaments) ↑ 2 promotion (2 teams from final's tournaments)				

== See also ==
- League system
- European professional club basketball system
- French basketball league system
- German basketball league system
- Greek basketball league system
- Hungarian basketball league system
- Italian basketball league system
- Russian basketball league system
- Serbian basketball league system
- Spanish basketball league system
- Turkish basketball league system
- South American professional club basketball system
