= South American professional club basketball system =

The South American professional club basketball system or South American professional club basketball pyramid is a series of interconnected competitions for professional basketball clubs in South America. The system has a hierarchical format with a promotion and relegation system between competitions at different levels. There are currently two different competitions on the pyramid – the 1st tier Basketball Champions League Americas, and the 2nd tier FIBA South American League. The 1st-tier level Basketball Champions League Americas is organized by FIBA Americas, and the 2nd-tier level FIBA South American League is organized by the South American Basketball Association (ABASU), which operates as a regional sub-zone of FIBA Americas.

== The tier pyramid ==
=== Current South American basketball competitions ===
Level	League
1	Basketball Champions League Americas (2019 – present)
2	FIBA South American League (2008 – present)

=== Evolution of the South American basketball competitions ===
The table below shows the tier structure of the pyramid for both the former eras and the current era. Current tier competitions are indicated in bold.

Level	League
1	**Basketball Champions League Americas** (2019 – present) FIBA Americas League (2007 – 2019) (Defunct); FIBA South American League (2001 – 2007) **(Current 2nd-tier)**; Pan American Club Championship (1993 – 2000) (Defunct); South American Championship of Champions Clubs (1946 – 1992) (Defunct)
2	**FIBA South American League** (1996 – 2000, 2008 – present) South American Championship of Champions Clubs (1993 – 1996, 2001 – 2007) (Defunct)
3	South American Championship of Champions Clubs (1996 – 2000, 2008) (Defunct)

=== History ===
The evolution of the top-tier international South American inter–continental and South American inter–regional professional club basketball competitions (1946—present):

- **CONSUBASQUET era: (1946–2007)**
  - Campeonato Sudamericano de Clubes Campeones de Básquetbol (English: South American Basketball Championship of Champions Clubs): (1946–1993)
  - Campeonato Panamericano de Clubes de Básquetbol (English: Pan American Basketball Club Championship): (1993–2000)
  - Liga Sudamericana de Básquetbol (LSB) (English: South American Basketball League): (2000–2007)
- **FIBA Americas era: (2007–present)**
  - FIBA Americas League: (2007 – 2019)
  - Basketball Champions League Americas: (2019 – present)

== See also ==
- League system
- European professional club basketball system
- Spanish basketball league system
- Greek basketball league system
- Italian basketball league system
- French basketball league system
- Russian basketball league system
- Turkish basketball league system
- German basketball league system
- Serbian basketball league system
- Polish basketball league system
- Hungarian basketball league system
