= Ungmennafélagið Katla =

Iceland Sports Club

- Founded: 20 June 1970; 54 years ago as Ungmennafélagið Drangur; 17 May 2008; 16 years ago as Ungmennafélagið Katla
- Location: Vík í Mýrdal, Iceland
- Website: www.umfkatla.wix.com

Ungmennafélagið Katla (Icelandic pronunciation: [ˈuŋkˌmɛnːaˌfjɛːˌlaijɪð ˈkʰahtla], lit. 'Katla Youth Club' (Note: Ungmennafélagið is the definite form of Ungmennafélag, meaning "the youth club".)) is a sports club located in Vík í Mýrdal, Iceland.

== History ==
Ungmennafélagið Katla was founded on 17 May 2008, when Ungmennafélagið Drangur and Ungmennafélagið Dyrhólaey merged.

== Basketball ==
In 2004, Ungmennafélagið Drangur won the 2. deild karla after beating ÍA in the playoffs final, 79–68, and gained promotion to the second-tier 1. deild karla. The team played two seasons in the 1. deild karla, finishing with a 6–12 record in both the 2004-2005 and 2005–2006 season.

Katla men's basketball team competed in the 2. deild karla during the 2011–2012 season. It finished 8th in group A.

=== Recent seasons ===
Season	Tier	League	Pos.	W–L	Playoffs	Icelandic Cup
As Drangur
2003–04	3	2. deild karla Group 6	1st	11–1	Champions	DNP
2004–05	2	1. deild karla	7th	6–12	DNQ	1st Round
2005–06	2	1. deild karla	6th	6–12	DNQ	1st Round
2006–07	3	2. deild karla Group 5	5th	3–13	DNQ	1st Round
As Katla
2011–12	3	2. deild karla Group A	8th	4–12	DNQ	1st Round

=== Notable players ===
- (Iceland) Björn Ægir Hjörleifsson
- (United States) Justin Shouse
- (United States) Jason Harden

=== Titles ===
- 2. deild karla
  - Winners: 2004^{1}

^{1} as Ungmennafélagið Drangur
