= Helgi Jónas Guðfinnsson =

Icelandic basketball coach and player (born 1976)

Álftanes
- Title: Assistant coach
- League: Úrvalsdeild

Personal information
- Born: 18 April 1976 (age 50)

Career information
- Playing career: 1992–2011
- Positions: Point guard, shooting guard
- Coaching career: 2010–present

Career history

Playing
- 1992–1993: Grindavík
- 1994–1998: Grindavík
- 1998–1999: Donar Groeningen
- 1999–2000: RB Antwerpen
- 2000–2001: Ieper
- 2001–2006: Grindavík
- 2008–2009: Grindavík
- 2010–2011: Grindavík
- 2011: ÍG

Coaching
- 2010–2012: Grindavík
- 2014: Keflavík
- 2019–2020: Grindavík (assistant)
- 2023–present: Álftanes (assistant)

Career highlights
- As player: Icelandic Basketball Player of the Year (1998); 2× Úrvalsdeild Domestic Player of the Year (1998, 2003); 3× Úrvalsdeild Domestic All-First Team (1997, 1998, 2003); Úrvalsdeild Young Player of the Year (1993); Icelandic League champion (1996); 3× Icelandic Cup (1995, 1998, 2006); Icelandic Supercup (1996); As coach: Úrvalsdeild Men's Coach of the Year (2012); Icelandic League champion (2012); Icelandic Men's Basketball Cup (2011); Icelandic Supercup (2011)

Helgi Jónas Guðfinnsson (born 18 April 1976) is an Icelandic basketball coach and former professional player. He spent the majority of his career with Grindavík where he won the Icelandic championship in 1996 and the Icelandic Cup in 1995, 1998 and 2006. He was twice named the Úrvalsdeild Domestic Player of the Year and once the Icelandic Basketball Men's Player of the Year. After his playing career came to an end, Helgi went into coaching and led Grindavík to the Icelandic Cup in 2011 and the national championship in 2012.

== Early life ==
Helgi Jónas grew up Neskaupsstaður where he trained skiing and football in his youth. At the age of 11, he moved with his family to Grindavík where he started playing basketball.

== Basketball ==
=== Playing career ===
After playing for Grindavík's junior teams, Helgi broke into the senior team during the 1992–1993 season, averaging 6.9 points in 23 games and being named the Úrvalsdeild Young Player of the Year. He spent the following season in high school in the United States before returning to Grindavík in 1994. In 1996, he helped Grindavík win its first ever national championship. After a standout 1997–1998 season, where he was named the Úrvalsdeild Domestic Player of the Year, he played professionally for Donar Groeningen, RB Antwerpen and Ieper for the next three seasons. He returned to Grindavík in 2001 and average 21.1 points in his first season back. For the 2002–03 season, he was named the Úrvalsdeild Domestic Player of the Year again after averaging 18.9 points per game.

After retiring in 2006, he returned during the 2008–09 season and helped Grindavík to the Úrvalsdeild finals where the team lost against KR 3–2. While serving as the head coach of Grindavík, Helgi appeared in a few games during the 2010–11 season due to injuries on the roster.

He last played for ÍG in 2011 in the second-tier 1. deild karla, appearing two games where he averaged 31.0 points, 9.0 rebounds and 6.0 assists.

=== National team career ===
From 1995 to 2001, Helgi played 63 games for the Icelandic national basketball team.

=== Coaching career ===
In April 2010, Helgi signed a three-year contract with Grindavík. He was voted the Úrvalsdeild coach of the year in 2012 after he led Grindavík to the Icelandic championship. After the season, he resigned from his post.

In April 2014, he signed a two-year contract as the head coach of rival Úrvalsdeild club Keflavík. In November the same year, he was forced to step down as head coach due to heart problems.

In May 2019, Helgi returned to coaching when he was hired as an assistant coach to Daníel Guðni Guðmundsson in Grindavík.

In August 2023, Helgi was hired as an assistant coach with Álftanes.

== Football ==
From 2002 to 2003, Helgi played nine games in the Icelandic top-tier football league as well as appear in one cup game for Grindavík's football team. He played as a forward.

== Personal life ==
Helgi's son is basketball player Arnór Tristan Helgason.
