= Jasmin Perković =

Croatian basketball player

Personal information
- Born: 25 December 1980 (age 45)
- Listed height: 206 cm (6 ft 9 in)
- Listed weight: 117 kg (258 lb)
- Position: Forward / center
- Number: 15

Career history
- 1998–2000: KK Kvarner
- 2000–2001: KK Triglav Kranj
- 2001–2002: Hopsi Polzela
- 2001–2002: Hopsi Polzela
- 2002–2003: KK Zadar
- 2002–2005: HKK Siroki
- 2005–2006: Bosna
- 2006–2007: AEK Athens
- 2007–2010: Baskets Oldenburg
- 2010–2012: Vanoli Cremona
- 2012–2013: Giessen 46ers
- 2013: KK Olimpija
- 2013–2014: Al Kuwait
- 2014–2015: Nift Al-Janoub
- 2015: BC Vienna
- 2015–2018: Škrljevo
- 2018–2019: Inter Bratislava
- 2019–2020: Tindastóll
- 2020: Hrunamenn
- 2021–2022: Kvarner 2010
Medals
- BBL champion (2009)
- Bosnian League champion (2004, 2006)
- Slovak League champion (2019)
- Bosnian Cup winner (2004)
- Croatian Cup winner (2003)
- Slovenian Cup winner (2013)
- BBL Champions Cup (2009)
- Bosnian All-Star (2004)

Jasmin Perković (born 25 December 1980) is a Croatian basketball player. A veteran of more than two decades, he played in the EuroLeague, the Greek Basket League and the Italian Lega Basket Serie A over the course of his career.

== Playing career ==
In July 2019, Perković signed with Tindastóll of the Icelandic Úrvalsdeild karla. In 17 games, he averaged 8.7 points and 7.1 rebounds in 25 minutes per game before the season ended prematurely due to the coronavirus pandemic in Iceland. The following season, he stayed in Iceland, signing with 1. deild karla club Hrunamenn in July 2020. In his debut with Hrunamenn, on 2 October, he had 12 points and 14 rebounds in a 95–81 victory against Selfoss. That turned out to be his last game for Hrunamenn as in November 2020, the club announced that Perković was forced to retire from professional basketball due to a hip injury. In 2021, he joined Kvarner 2010. He appeared in 7 games for the rest of the season, averaging 17.0 points and 5.1 rebounds per game.

== National team career ==
In 2001, Perković helped Croatia finish second in the FIBA Under-21 World Championship.
