= Hungarian basketball league system =

The Hungarian basketball league system, or Hungarian basketball league pyramid is a series of interconnected competitions for professional basketball clubs in the country of Hungary. The system has a hierarchical format with a promotion and demotion system between competitions at different levels.

== Men ==
=== The tier levels ===
For the 2015–16 season, the Hungarian basketball league system is as follows:

Level Clubs	Divisions			
1; 14	Nemzeti Bajnokság I/A (NB I/A); 14 clubs			
2; 24	Nemzeti Bajnokság I/B (NB I/B); West; 12 clubs		Nemzeti Bajnokság I/B (NB I/B); East; 12 clubs	
3; 54	Nemzeti Bajnokság II (NB II); West; 11 clubs	Nemzeti Bajnokság II (NB II); Middle A 16 clubs	Nemzeti Bajnokság II (NB II); Middle B 16 clubs	Nemzeti Bajnokság II (NB II); East; 11 clubs
4	Regional divisions			

== Cup competitions ==
- Magyar Kupa (men's basketball) (Magyar Kupa, férfi)
- Magyar Kupa (women's basketball) (Magyar Kupa, női)

== See also ==
- League system
- European professional club basketball system
- Spanish basketball league system
- Greek basketball league system
- Italian basketball league system
- French basketball league system
- Russian basketball league system
- Turkish basketball league system
- German basketball league system
- Serbian basketball league system
- Polish basketball league system
- South American professional club basketball system
