= Gnúpverjar (basketball club) =

- Arena: Kennaraháskólinn
- Location: Reykjavík, Iceland
- Team colors: Green, Gold, Blue
- Website: Gnupnation.is
Home	Away

Körfuknattleiksdeild Gnúpverja, commonly known as Gnúpverjar, is a basketball club based in Reykjavík, Iceland. It is part of the Ungmennafélag Gnúpverja multi-sport club.

== History ==
The club finished as the runner-up in Division II in 1991, losing to Keilufélag Reykjavíkur 69-61, and 1992. In 1992, it had originally lost to ÍFL in the playoff final, 97–49, but due to ÍFL using an illegal player against Bolungarvík during the group stage, the final had to be replayed. As Bolungarvík was awarded 2–0 victory in the group stage game against ÍFL, they finished top in their group and advanced to the final game. In the rematch, Gnúpverjar lost again, this time 68–54.

After years of hiatus, the team was resurrected in 2015 and rapidly moved up the Icelandic basketball league pyramid, winning Division III in its ignaural season in 2016 and finishing second in Division II in 2017 and achieving promotion to Division I. The team finished 6th in the Division I during the 2017-2018 season, with Everage Richardson finishing as the league's leading scorer with 38.9 points per game.

== Honors ==
=== Men's ===
- Division II:

Runner up's: 1991, 1992, 2017

- Division III:

Winners: 2016

== Notable players ==
- (United States) Everage Richardson
- (Iceland) Tómas Steindórsson
