= Ungmennafélag Hrunamanna =

Icelandic sports club

UMFH
- Full name: Ungmennafélag Hrunamanna
- Sports: Basketball; Football; Gymnastics; Track&field; Volleyball
- Founded: 17 April 1908
- Location: Flúðir, Iceland
- Stadium: Íþróttahúsið Flúðum
- Colors: Blue, green, white

Ungmennafélag Hrunamanna (Icelandic pronunciation: [ˈuŋkˌmɛnːaˌfjɛːˌlaːɣ ˈr̥ʏːnaˌmanːa], lit. 'Hruni Youth Club' (Note: Hrunamanna is the definite form of Hrunamenn, which is the adjective and demonym of Hruni.)), commonly known as Hrunamenn (Note: Hrunamenn is the adjective and demonym of Hruni.) or UMFH, is a multi-sport club in Flúðir, Iceland. It was founded in 1908.

== Basketball ==
=== Men's basketball ===
==== History ====
In 2020, Hrunamenn where offered and accepted a vacant seat in the second-tier 1. deild karla. In July 2020, the team signed former EuroLeague player Jasmin Perković as a player/assistant coach.

==== Trophies and achievements ====
- 2. deild karla
  - Winners: 2008, 2017^{1}

^{1} As Hrunamenn/Laugdælir

==== Coaching history ====
- (Iceland) Árni Þór Hilmarsson 200?–2011
- (Iceland) Árni Þór Hilmarsson 2014–present

==== Notable players ====
- (Croatia) Jasmin Perković

== Volleyball ==
=== Men's Volleyball ===
==== Trophies and achievements ====
- 2. deild karla
  - Winners: 2013
