= European professional club basketball system =

Professional basketball clubs in Europe

Professional basketball clubs in Europe can compete in a number of different competitions, including national leagues, regional (multi-national) leagues, and continental competitions. It is therefore possible for clubs from some countries to take part in several levels of competition in the same season. Clubs usually qualify for European competitions through performance in their national or regional leagues, with the exception of wild cards.

== Continental competitions ==
There are currently five competitions which are branded as Europe-wide, two controlled by Euroleague Basketball, two by FIBA Europe and one patronised by FIBA. Clubs which compete in these competitions also play in their national and/or regional leagues. Clubs usually qualify for these competitions based on their performance in the national or regional leagues in the previous season.

The EuroLeague is a competition with currently 20 teams. It has historically been the most prestigious competition in European basketball and is widely recognised as the top-tier league in Europe.

The EuroCup is Euroleague Basketball's secondary competition, and currently made up of 32 teams from around Europe. The two finalists of the EuroCup qualify for the next season's EuroLeague.

The Basketball Champions League, which began in 2016, is FIBA Europe's highest competition. Initially, FIBA established EuroLeague in 1958 but never trademarketed the name which was later taken over by Euroleague Basketball. The Basketball Champions League involves 52 teams.

The Europe Cup is FIBA Europe's secondary competition. 47 teams compete, and the teams which did not enter in the Basketball Champions League regular season have the option to drop down into the regular season of the Europe Cup.

The European North Basketball League is featuring teams from across Europe. Despite its name, the league is not limited to northern Europe, covering wider regions of teams that did not qualify for other continental competition.

=== Women ===
- EuroLeague Women (FIBA)
- EuroCup Women (FIBA)
- Europe SuperCup Women (FIBA)
- European Women's Basketball League

=== Youth ===
- Next Generation Tournament (Euroleague Basketball)
- Youth Basketball Champions League

=== Defunct ===
- FIBA Saporta Cup (1966–2002)
- International Christmas Tournament (1966–2006)
- FIBA Korać Cup (1971–2002)
- Ronchetti Cup (1971–2002)
- European Super Cup (1983–1991)
- FIBA SuproLeague (2000–2001)
- FIBA EuroCup Challenge (2002–2007)
- FIBA Europe Regional Challenge Cup (2002–03)
- FIBA EuroChallenge (2003–2015)

== Regional leagues ==
In addition to national leagues in individual countries, there are leagues which include clubs from several countries.

The ABA League, commonly called the Adriatic League, began in 2001, and consists of clubs from the former Yugoslavia (Bosnia and Herzegovina, Croatia, Montenegro, North Macedonia, Serbia and Slovenia). At different times, the league has also included clubs from Austria, Bulgaria, the Czech Republic, Hungary, Romania, UAE and Israel. Clubs generally also compete in their own national leagues in the same season, after the conclusion of the ABA League season. The winner of the league qualifies for the next season's EuroLeague.

Balkan International Basketball League began in 2008 and European North Basketball League started in 2021.

The VTB United League is made up of mostly Russian clubs, as well as a smaller number of clubs from nearby countries - currently Belarus and Kazakhstan. It serves as the top division of the Russian national league system.

Other multi-national leagues in Europe have included the North European Basketball League (1999–2003), the Baltic Basketball League (2004–2018), the Central European Basketball League (2008–2010), the Alpe Adria Cup (2015–2024), the Latvian-Estonian Basketball League, and the BNXT League.

== National leagues ==
Each country generally has its own league system, with various divisions which involve promotion and relegation, as well as playoffs following the regular season.

The Spanish Liga ACB contributes the most, three to four clubs to the EuroLeague each season. Other leagues among the strongest include Turkey's BSL, Russia's VTB United League, Italy's LBA, the LNB Pro A in France, the Greek Basketball League, the Basketball Bundesliga in Germany, and the ABA League.

== See also ==
- League system
- Spanish basketball league system
- Greek basketball league system
- Italian basketball league system
- French basketball league system
- Russian basketball league system
- Turkish basketball league system
- German basketball league system
- Serbian basketball league system
- Polish basketball league system
- Hungarian basketball league system
- South American professional club basketball system
