= Turkish basketball league system =

- Country: Turkey
- Sport: Basketball
- Promotion and relegation: Yes

National system
- Federation: Turkish Basketball Federation
- Confederation: FIBA Europe
- Top division: Super League
- Second division: First League
- Cup competition: Presidential Cup; Turkish Cup

The Turkish basketball league system or Turkish basketball league pyramid, is a series of interconnected competitions for professional basketball clubs in Turkey. The system has a hierarchical format with a promotion and demotion system between competitions at different levels. There are currently five different competitions on the pyramid: the 1st-tier Turkish Basketball Super League (BSL), the 2nd-tier Turkish Basketball First League (TBL), the 3rd-tier Turkish Basketball Second League (TB2L), the 4th-tier Turkish Men's Regional Basketball League (EBBL), and the 5th-tier Men's University League (Ünilig).

== The tier pyramid ==
Level	League
1	Basketball Super League (BSL) (formerly known as Turkish Basketball League (TBL)); National 1st Division (16 teams)
2	Turkish Basketball League (TBL) (formerly known as Turkish Basketball Second League (TB2L)); National 2nd Division (18 teams)
3	Turkish Basketball 2. League (TB2L) (formerly known as Turkish Basketball Third League (TB3L)); National 3rd Division (25 teams in one 9 team group and two 8 team groups)
4	Turkish Men's Regional Basketball League (EBBL); National 4th Division (TBA)

== Other competitions ==
- Turkish Basketball Cup
- Turkish President's Cup

== See also ==
- League system
- European professional club basketball system
- Spanish basketball league system
- Greek basketball league system
- Italian basketball league system
- French basketball league system
- Russian basketball league system
- German basketball league system
- Serbian basketball league system
- Polish basketball league system
- Hungarian basketball league system
- South American professional club basketball system
