= Mostri Stykkishólmur =

Mostri
- Founded: 2006
- Folded: 2013
- History: Mostri (2006–2013)
- Arena: Fjárhúsið
- Location: Stykkishólmur, Iceland
- Team colors: Pink, black, white
Home	Away

The Mostri men's basketball team, commonly known as Mostri, was the men's basketball team of Golfklúbburinn Mostri in Stykkishólmur, Iceland. It played in the 2. deild karla and the Icelandic Men's Basketball Cup from 2006 to 2013. It was the runner-up in 2. deild karla in 2013 and won promotion to 1. deild karla but folded after the season. They were known for their pink and black uniforms.

== Honours ==
- 2. deild karla
  - Runner-up: 2013

== Seasons ==
Results of league and cup competitions by season
Season	Division	P	W	L	PTS	F	A	Pos	Playoffs	Icelandic Cup
Season	League								Playoffs	Icelandic Cup
2006-2007	2. deild Group A	14	8	6	16	964	1019	5th	DNQ	R2
2007-2008	2. deild Group B	10	7	3	14	697	648	3rd	DNQ	R1
2008-2009	2. deild Group B	15	12	3	24	1263	905	2nd	SF	R1
2009-2010	2. deild Group B	15	7	8	14	1087	1137	5th	DNQ	R1
2011-2012	2. deild Group A	16	16	0	32	1407	986	1st	R1	R2
2012-2013	2. deild Group B	14	12	2	24	1042	816	1st	Finals	R1
