= French basketball league system =

The French basketball league system is a series of interconnected competitions for professional basketball clubs in France. The system has a hierarchical format with a promotion and relegation system between competitions at different levels. Some of the competitions are: the LNB Élite, Élite 2, Nationale Masculine 1 (NM1), the Nationale Masculine 2 (NM2), the Nationale Masculine 3 (NM3), and the LNB Espoirs.

== The competitions ==
Level	League
1	LNB Élite; National 1st division (professional) (16 teams)
2	Élite 2 National 2nd division (professional) (18 teams)
3	Nationale Masculine 1 (NM1); National 3rd Division (Professional) (28 teams in 2 groups)
4	Nationale Masculine 2 (NM2); National 4th division (Professional) (56 teams in 4 groups)
5	Nationale Masculine 3 (NM3); National 5th division (amateur) (144 teams in 12 groups)
	LNB Espoirs; Under-21 age group

== Other competitions ==
- French Cup
- French Leaders Cup
- Match des Champions

== See also ==
- League system
- European professional club basketball system
- Spanish basketball league system
- Greek basketball league system
- Italian basketball league system
- Russian basketball league system
- Turkish basketball league system
- German basketball league system
- Serbian basketball league system
- Polish basketball league system
- Hungarian basketball league system
- South American professional club basketball system
