= Hrunamannahreppur =

Municipality in Iceland

- Municipality
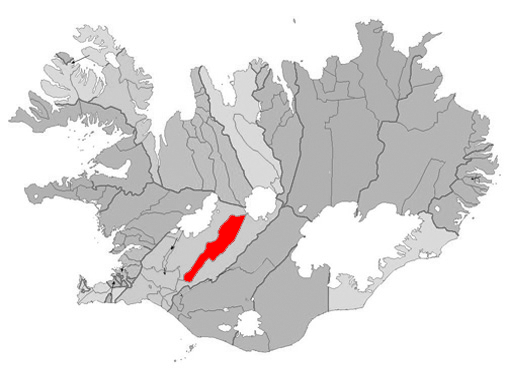
- Location of the municipality

- Location within Iceland
- Coordinates: 64.125°N 20.358°W
- Country: Iceland
- Region: Southern Region
- Constituency: South Constituency

Government
  - Manager: Jón G. Valgeirsson

Area
  - Total: 1,375 km^{2} (531 sq mi)

Population
  - Total: 785
  - Density: 0.57/km^{2} (1.5/sq mi)
- Postal code(s): 845
- Municipal number: 8710
- Website: fludir.is

Hrunamannahreppur (Icelandic pronunciation: [ˈr̥ʏːnaˌmanːaˌr̥ɛhpʏr̥], lit. 'Hreppur (district) of the people of Hruni' (Note: Hrunamanna is the genitive case of Hrunamenn, which is the demonym of Hruni.)) is a municipality located in Iceland. Its major settlement is Flúðir.

The district abuts the Highlands, so that farmers' livestock occasionally strays there.

Hrunamannahreppur and other parts of southwest Iceland were among the first where biting midges (Ceratopogonidae) were detected after their first appearance in Iceland in 2015.

== Localities ==
- Hvítárholt
