= Lárus Jónsson =

Icelandic basketball player and coach

Grindavík
- Title: Assistant coach
- League: Úrvalsdeild karla

Personal information
- Born: 28 November 1978 (age 47)

Career information
- Playing career: 1998–2015
- Position: Point guard
- Coaching career: 2011–present

Career history

Playing
- 1998–2004: Hamar
- 2004–2005: KR
- 2005–2006: Fjölnir
- 2006–2007: Hamar/Selfoss
- 2007–2008: Hamar
- 2008–2009: SISU BK
- 2010–2011: Njarðvík
- 2011–2013: Hamar
- 2014–2015: Hamar

Coaching
- 2011–2012: Hamar (W)
- 2011–2013: Hamar (M)
- 2016–2017: Breiðablik
- 2018–2020: Þór Akureyri
- 2020–2026: Þór Þorlákshöfn
- 2026–present: Grindavík (assistant)

Career highlights
- As player: Úrvalsdeild Domestic All-First Team (2004); 1. deild karla winner (1999); 2× Úrvalsdeild karla assist leader (2003, 2004); As coach: Icelandic champion (2021); Icelandic Super Cup winner (2021); 1. deild karla winner (2019); Úrvalsdeild Karla Coach of the Year (2021)

Lárus Jónsson (born 28 November 1978) is an Icelandic basketball coach and former player. As a player, he played several seasons in the Icelandic top-tier Úrvalsdeild karla and was a member of the Icelandic national team. In 2021 he led Þór Þorlákshöfn to its first ever national championship.

== Playing career ==
=== Club career ===
Lárus started his career with Hamar in Hveragerði and led the Úrvalsdeild karla in assists in 2003 and 2004. before signing with KR in 2004. He played for KR in 2004–2005 where he averaged 7.2 points and 6.1 assists, he signed with Fjölnir in 2005 but returned to Hamar the following season. He played for SISU BK in Denmark during the 2008–2009 season before returning to Iceland in 2010 and signing with Njarðvík. The following season, he returned to Hamar where he finished his playing career in 2015.

=== National team career ===
Lárus played 8 games for the Icelandic national team in 2004.

== Coaching career ==
He coached the Hamar men's team from 2011 to 2013 and its women's team from 2011 and 2012. He was the head coach of Breiðablik men's team from 2016 until February 2017.

In April 2018, he was hired as the head coach of Þór Akureyri for the 2018–19 season. He guided the team to victory in the 1. deild karla and promotion to the Úrvalsdeild in 2019.

In April 2020, Lárus left Þór Akureyri and signed with Þór Þorlákshöfn where he was credited with turning the team into a serious contender. On 25 June 2021 he led Þór Þorlákshöfn to its first ever national championship after it beat top-seeded Keflavík 3-1 in the Úrvalsdeild finals. Following the season, he was named the Úrvalsdeild Coach of the Year.

On 2 October 2021, he led Þór to an 113–100 win against Njarðvík in the Icelandic Super Cup. He stepped down as head coach in May 2026.

In July 2026, Lárus was hired as an assistant coach for Grindavík.
