= Hvítárholt =

Coordinates: 64.147754°N 20.364289°W

Hvítárholt (Icelandic pronunciation: [ˈkʰviːtˌaurˌhɔl̥t]) is a settlement located on the banks of the Hvítá in Hrunamannahreppur, Árnessýsla, Iceland. It is one of the earliest settlements to have been excavated in Iceland, and the excavation yielded important information on early building construction, plus a Roman coin.

== Settlement ==
The location of Hvítárholt is somewhat unusual because the settlement is at a high elevation and has been on the weather side, and also there is no good supply of water nearby. The Hvítá River freezes in winter and also floods above its banks in the spring thaw. It seems not unlikely that these circumstances played a part in the ancient settlement being abandoned or relocated.

== Archaeological finds ==
In summer 1963, remains of ancient human habitation were found at Hvítárholt. On closer examination, the researchers realised that it was a question of a settlement from the Saga Age, and it was decided to undertake a complete investigation of the area around the present-day settlement. An extensive archaeological investigation was carried out, which lasted with interruptions from summer 1963 to 1967. The investigation was led by Þór Magnússon; Guðmundur Jónsson, Gísli Gestsson, Kristján Eldjárn and Halldór J. Jónsson also worked on it. It is one of the oldest Icelandic settlements to have been excavated, dating to the 9th century.

The area across which the finds were distributed was quite extensive: a ridge from 600 to 800 metres (660 to 870 yd) wide.

The investigation at Hvítárholt was the most extensive settlement dig that the National Museum of Iceland had conducted up to that time. By the time it ended, it had produced some of the most important and unusual artifacts of the Saga Age and of human occupation that have been excavated in Iceland and increased our knowledge of how people lived. In all, ten buildings of various types were found, all of which appeared to date to the same period, approximately the 10th century. There were three large longhouses and remains of a barn and a cowshed. In addition to this, remains of five pit houses were found, a totally unknown type of house in Iceland.

One other thing that made the excavation at Hvítárholt remarkable was that it was the first time a dig was carried out at a site that is mentioned nowhere in ancient texts. The longhouses were of roughly equal size; it has been suggested that this kind of multi-family settlement represents a pioneer stage, as also seen at L'Anse aux Meadows in Newfoundland, where there were also several equally large buildings, and that all or most of the settlers later dispersed.

=== Longhouses ===
The three timber longhouses found at Hvítáholt were all approximately 20 metres (22 yd) long. They were carefully constructed rectangular buildings with curving walls. They conformed almost perfectly to the image we had of house construction in 10th-century Iceland. They closely matched houses from the same period which have been found in the Faroes, Orkney and Denmark. In one respect, however, the longhouses were unusual: they had walls which are primarily known in neighbouring countries and had not previously been encountered in Iceland.

=== Pit houses ===
The most remarkable find, however, was the five earth-houses or pit-houses, a form of architecture previously totally unknown in Iceland, which were a surprise to the archaeologists. The Hvítáholt pit houses are simple holes in the ground, approximately 3 to 4 metres (3.3 to 4.4 yd) in diameter and approximately 1 metre (1.1 yd) deep. In some of them hearths and stones fractured by heat were found. There are several mentions of earth-houses in the Icelandic sagas, for example in Eyrbyggja saga. There a dug-out bath-house is described which resembles the appearance of the pit houses at Hvítárholt. This may provide a possible explanation of their purpose. Pit houses are a remarkable discovery in the field of Icelandic archaeology.

=== Roman coin ===
In addition, one of the largest buildings yielded a Roman copper antoninianus, dated to 275–276 CE. The question posed by this find was what were the people at Hvítáholt at that time doing with a Roman coin? Kristján Eldjarn suggested that Roman seamen may have gone off course for Britain and landed in eastern Iceland long before its settlement by the Norse, and Vikings later found the coin there and took it home; this seems the most plausible theory.
