= Höttur (men's basketball) =

Basketball division of Icelandic sports club

- Founded: 1974
- Arena: MVA Höllin Egilsstöðum
- Location: Egilsstaðir, Iceland
- Team colors: black, white, red
- President: Ásthildur Jónasdóttir
- Head coach: Viðar Örn Hafsteinsson and Einar Árni Jóhannsson
- Website: hottur.is
Home	Away

The Höttur men's basketball team, commonly known as Höttur, is the men's basketball department of the Icelandic multi-sport club Íþróttafélagið Höttur.

== Recent history ==
Höttur first achieved promotion to the top-tier Úrvalsdeild karla in 2005, after beating Valur in the 1. deild karla promotion finals. It finished last in the 2005–2006 Úrvalsdeild, with 3 victories in 22 games, and was relegated back to 1. deild karla. The team won 1. deild karla and was promoted to the Úrvalsdeild again in 2015 and 2017 only to be relegated back both times. Höttur was on top when the 2019–20 season was cut short during the COVID-19 pandemic and was promoted to Úrvalsdeild karla. Despite winning 7 games, the team was relegated at the end of the 2020–21 season. On 18 May, Höttur hired Einar Árni Jóhannsson as a co-head coach alongside Viðar Örn Hafsteinsson. In 2022, the team was again promoted to the Úrvalsdeild after winning the 1. deild promotion playoffs.

== Trophies and awards ==
=== Trophies ===
- 1. deild karla:
  - Winners (4): 2015, 2017, 2020, 2026

=== Awards ===
1. deild karla Coach of the Year

- Viðar Örn Hafsteinsson – 2015, 2017

1. deild karla Domestic All-First team

- Eysteinn Ævarsson – 2019
- Hreinn Gunnar Birgisson – 2015
- Mirko Stefán Virijevic – 2017
- Ragnar Gerald Albertsson – 2017

== Notable past players ==
Note: Flags indicate national team eligibility at FIBA-sanctioned events. Players may hold other non-FIBA nationalities not displayed.

Criteria

To appear in this section a player must have either:

- Set a club record or won an individual award while at the club
- Played at least one official international match for their national team at any time
- Played at least one official NBA match at any time.

- (Netherlands) Bryan Alberts
- (New Zealand) Everard Bartlett
- (Iceland) Mirko Stefán Virijevic
- (Iceland) Sigurður Þorsteinsson
- (Iceland) Viðar Örn Hafsteinsson
- (Iceland) Eysteinn Bjarni Ævarsson
