= Everage Richardson =

American-Icelandic basketball player

Personal information
- Born: December 23, 1985 (age 40) Brooklyn, New York, U.S.
- Listed height: 6 ft 3 in (1.91 m)
- Listed weight: 185 lb (84 kg)

Career information
- High school: Washington Irving (New York, New York, U.S.)
- College: Sullivan County (2004–2006); Coastal Carolina (2006–2008)
- Playing career: 2009–2025
- Position: Guard

Career history
- 2009–2013: Bodfeld Baskets
- 2013–2014: SC Itzehoe
- 2014–2017: Résidence Walferdange
- 2017–2018: Gnúpverjar
- 2018–2020: Hamar
- 2020–2021: ÍR
- 2021–2024: Breiðablik
- 2024–2025: Haukar

Career highlights
- Úrvalsdeild scoring champion (2022); 3x Icelandic D1 scoring champion (2018–2020); Total League scoring champion (2015)

Everage Lee Richardson (born December 23, 1985) is an American and Icelandic basketball. A high scoring guard, he has played professionally in Germany, Luxembourg and Iceland.

== College career ==
After graduating from Washington Irving High School in New York in 2004, Richardson played college basketball at Sullivan County Community College in Loch Sheldrake. He was named Mid Hudson Conference Most Valuable Player in 2004-05 and 2005-06, while earning Junior College All-American distinction twice. While at Coastal Carolina from 2006 to 2008, Richardson averaged 9.5 points, 3.1 rebounds and 2.2 assists a game in 2006-07 and 13.8 points, 4.1 rebounds and 2.0 steals per game as a senior.

== Club career ==
Richardson sat out a year after college and first joined TuS Elbingerode (later named Bodfeld Baskets) of the German Landesliga (seventh-tier) in 2009. Across the 2009-10 season, he averaged 48.8 points a contest, helping the team climb to the next higher league. In the 2010-11 Oberliga campaign, he led all scorers again: Richardson had 47.8 points per game, winning the Oberliga championship with Bodfeld. Because of his high-scoring, Eurobasket.com granted him the title Best basketball scorer of the World.

In 2011–2012, Richardson averaged 42.1 points per game for the Bodfeld Baskets in the 2. Regionalliga, helping his team win another championship which secured a spot in the fourth highest German division, 1. Regionalliga, for the following season. While at Bodfeld, he earned the nickname "Die Schwarze Perle" (The Black Pearl). In 2012–2013, Richardson averaged 33.0 points a contest and was named 1st Regionalliga North Player of the Year (by Eurobasket.com) at the end of the season.

In 2013, Richardson joined SC Itzehoe in the 1. Regionalliga. He had an average of 28.0 points a contest for Itzehoe across the 2013-14 season, earning him Eurobasket.com 1st Regionalliga North Player of the Year honors the second straight year.

He played for Résidence Walferdange in the Total League from 2014 to 2017. In the 2014-15 season, he emerged as the league’s leading scorer (28.7 points per game). The following season (2015-16), Richardson ranked sixth in the Total League in points per contest (25.5). In his third and final campaign at Walferdange, he pitched in with 25.6 points a game.

In 2017, Richardson signed with newly promoted Gnúpverjar in the 1. deild karla. He led the league in scoring, averaging 38.9 points per game.

In May 2018, Richardson signed with Hamar. He led the 1. deild karla in scoring again during the 2018–2019 season, averaging 29.7 points per game. During the 2019–2020 season, he averaged a league leading 26.5 points per game, helping Hamar to the second best record in the league. However, because the season finished prematurely due to the COVID-19 outbreak in Iceland, Hamar was not promoted to the Úrvalsdeild karla.

On 16 April 2020, Richardson signed with Úrvalsdeild karla club ÍR. He appeared in 22 games, averaging 18.1 and team leading 6.2 assists per game.

After one season with ÍR, Richardson signed with newly promoted Breiðablik in June 2021. In his Úrvalsdeild debut with the team, he had 27 points, 10 rebounds and 9 assists in an overtime loss against KR. On 7 February 2022, Richardson scored 44 points in a victory against Tindastóll. It was the highest scoring output by any player in the Úrvalsdeild in the season. Richardson re-signed with Breiðablik in April 2022.

On 16 January 2024, Richardson signed with Haukar where he was reunited with Máté Dalmay, his head coach at Gnúpverjar and Hamar.
