= 3. deild karla (basketball) =

- Founded: 2015
- First season: 2015
- Country: Iceland
- Confederation: FIBA Europe
- Number of teams: 7
- Level on pyramid: 4
- Promotion to: 2. deild karla
- Domestic cup: Icelandic Basketball Cup
- Supercup: Icelandic Super Cup
- Current champions: Selfoss-b (1st title)
- Most championships: Six teams (1 title)
- CEO: Hannes S. Jónsson
- Website: www.kki.is

3. deild karla (English: Men's 3. Division) or D3 is the fourth tier basketball competition among clubs in Iceland. It is organized by the Icelandic Basketball Federation (Icelandic: Körfuknattleikssamband Íslands – KKÍ). It consists of 8 teams and the season consists of a schedule of 14 games. The top four teams meet in a playoff for the victory in the 3. deild. The two finalists achieve promotion to 2. deild karla.

== History ==
=== Creation ===
3. deild karla originated in 2015 and consists of 10 teams. On 13 March 2020, the 2019–20 season was postponed due to the COVID-19 outbreak in Iceland. The day after, the Icelandic Basketball Federation canceled the rest of the season. The 2020–21 season was initially postponed in October after another outbreak of COVID-19 in the country. In January 2021 it was announced that the season would start on 13 February but with Hamar-b having withdrawn from the league.

== Champions ==
Season	Winner	Runner-up	Score
2015–16	Gnúpverjar	Laugdælir	78-72
2016–17	Sindri Höfn	Þór Þorlákshöfn-b	82-67
2017–18	Álftanes	Vestri-b	82–72
2018–19	Breiðablik-b	ÍR-b	78–68
2019–20	Season canceled early due to the Coronavirus pandemic in Iceland. (Note: Álftanes-b had the best record at the time of cancelation, having won all of its 12 games.)		
2020–21	Season canceled early due to the Coronavirus pandemic in Iceland. (Note: Vestri-b had the best record at the time of cancelation, having won all of its 3 games.)		
2021–22	Haukar-b	Álftanes-b	
2024–25	Selfoss-b	Höttur-b	

== Titles per club ==
Titles	Club
1	Breiðablik-b, Álftanes, Gnúpverjar, Haukar-b, UMF Sindri Höfn, Selfoss-b
