= Árni Halldórsson =

Icelandic priest (1630 – 1687)

Árni Halldórsson of Hruni (1630 – 1687) was an Icelandic priest and scholar.

== Life ==
Árni was born in 1630 in southwest Iceland. He travelled to Copenhagen for study in 1655, gaining his attestats (right to preach) and returning to Iceland in 1657. In 1661, Árni became the priest of Skálholt, the episcopal seat of Brynjólfur Sveinsson. However, Árni's brother Daði Halldórsson got Brynjólfur's daughter Ragnheiður pregnant, and by 1662 Árni had gone home to Hruni. Nonetheless, Árni had a productive career in which he translated a number of texts into Icelandic, including Hans Mogenssøn's Danish version of The Book of Joseph and Aseneth. It appears that, at least late in life, Árni suffered from lameness, having to sit to preach and to be carried between the altar and the pulpit during church services.
