= ÍG =

Íþróttafélag Grindavíkur
- History: ÍG (2000–present)
- Arena: Íþróttahús Grindavíkur
- Location: Grindavík, Iceland
- Team colors: Blue, white

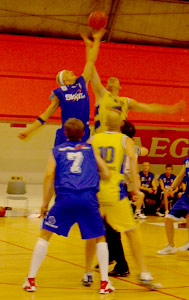

Íþróttafélag Grindavíkur, commonly known as ÍG, is a basketball club in Grindavík, Iceland.

== Trophies and achievements ==
=== Trophies ===
- 2. deild karla:

Winners: (2) 2011, 2014
Runner-ups: (4) 2001, 2003, 2006, 2009

== Notable past players ==
- (Iceland) Guðmundur Bragason
- (Iceland) Helgi Jónas Guðfinnsson
