= Margrét Erla Maack =

Icelandic entertainer

- Born: 25 April 1984 (age 41); Iceland
- Occupations: Burlesque dancer, circus performer, entertainer, television host
- Known for: Gettu betur Kastljós; Reykjavík kabarett Sirkus Ísland
- Children: 1
- Website: margretmaack.com

Margrét Erla Maack (born 25 April 1984) is an Icelandic entertainer and television host. She has worked on the TV programs Gettu betur, Kastljós and Ísland í dag.

== Personal life ==
Margrét dated Tómas Steindórsson from 2017 to 2023. In 2019, they had their first child together.
