= Italian basketball league system =

Basketball League System in Italy

The Italian basketball league system or Italian basketball league pyramid, is a series of interconnected competitions for professional basketball clubs in Italy. The system has a hierarchical format with a promotion and demotion system between competitions at different levels. There are currently nine different competitions on the pyramid: the 1st-tier Lega Basket Serie A (LBA), the 2nd-tier Serie A2 Basket, the 3rd-tier Serie B Basket, the 4th-tier Serie C Gold Basket, the 5th-tier Serie C Regionale, the 6th-tier Serie D Regionale, the 7th-tier Promozione, the 8th-tier Prima Divisione, and the 9th-tier Seconda Divisione.

== The tier pyramid ==
Level	League
1.	Lega Basket Serie A (LBA); National Professional 1st Division (16 teams)
2.	Serie A2 Basket; National Professional 2nd Division (32 teams in two 16 team groups)
3.	Serie B Basket; National semi-pro 3rd Division (64 teams in four 16 team groups)
4.	Serie C Gold Basket; National semi-pro 4th Division (98 teams in 7 groups)
5.	Serie C Regionale; Regional 1st Division
6.	Serie D Regionale; Regional 2nd Division
7.	Promozione; Regional 3rd Division
8.	Prima Divisione; Regional 4th Division
9.	Seconda Divisione; Regional 5th Division

== Other competitions ==
- Italian Cup
- Italian Supercup
- Italian Legadue Cup

== See also ==
- League system
- European professional club basketball system
- Spanish basketball league system
- Greek basketball league system
- French basketball league system
- Russian basketball league system
- Turkish basketball league system
- Serbian basketball league system
- Polish basketball league system
- Hungarian basketball league system
- South American professional club basketball system
