= Reynir Sandgerði =

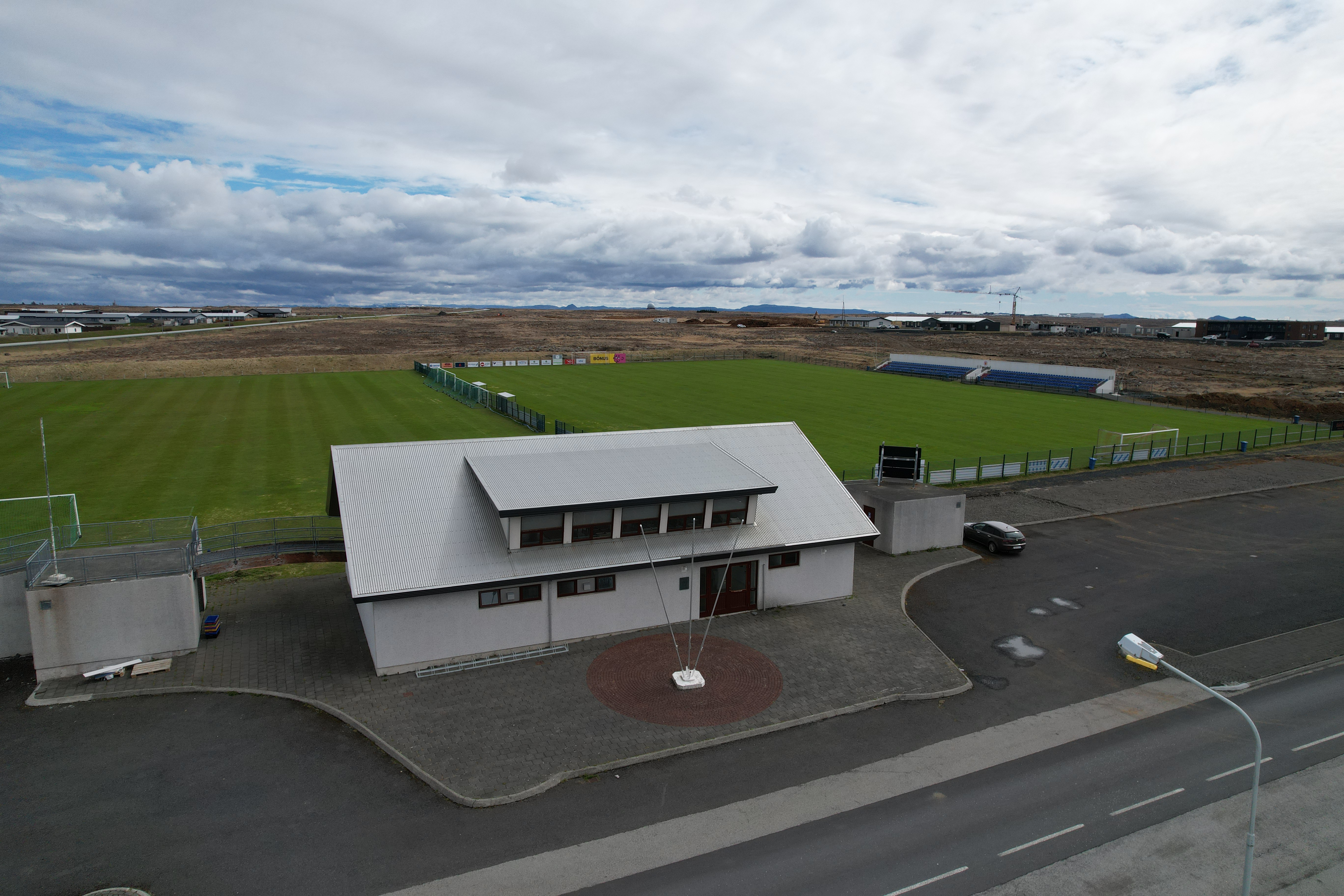
- Full name: Knattspyrnufélagið Reynir
- Sports: Basketball, Football, Swimming
- Founded: 1935
- Team history: Reynir Sandgerði; 1935–present
- Based in: Sandgerði, Iceland
- Chairman: Tyrfingur Andrésson
- Website: reynir.is

Reynir Sandgerði (Icelandic pronunciation: [ˈreiːnɪr̥ ˈsantˌcɛrðɪ]), sometimes known as Reynir S., is an Icelandic sports club based in Sandgerði on the Reykjanes peninsular. The club has active departments in football, basketball and swimming.

== Basketball ==
Reynir Sandgerði's basketball department was founded in 1980. It played in the top-tier Úrvalsdeild karla during the 1989–1990 season. In 2021, the team won 2. deild karla and was promoted to 1. deild karla. Prior to the start of the 2021–2022 season, the team withdrew from competition.

=== Honours ===
- 1. deild karla (1):
  - 1989
- 2. deild karla (2):
  - 1984, 2001, 2021

=== Notable players ===
Note: Flags indicate national team eligibility at FIBA-sanctioned events. Players may hold other non-FIBA nationalities not displayed.

Criteria

To appear in this section a player must have either:

- Set a club record or won an individual award while at the club
- Played at least one official international match for their national team at any time
- Played at least one official NBA match at any time.

- (Iceland) Axel Nikulásson
- (United States) Davíð Alan Grissom
- (Iceland) Gylfi Þorkelsson
- (Iceland) Magnús Þór Gunnarsson
- (United States) Reggie Dupree

=== Coaches ===
- (United States) Davíð Alan Grissom 1989–1990
- (United States) Davíð Alan Grissom 1996–1997

== Football ==
Reynir Sandgerði
- Ground: Brons völlurinn, Sandgerði
- Manager: Ray Jónsson
- League: 3. deild karla
- 2025: 3. deild karla, 5th of 12

In 2018, Reynir's men's football team finished first the 4. deild karla, defeating Kórdrengir 7–1 in the playoffs final.

=== Honours ===
- 4. deild karla (1):
  - 2018

=== Current squad ===
As of 31 July 2024

Note: Flags indicate national team as defined under FIFA eligibility rules; some limited exceptions apply. Players may hold more than one non-FIFA nationality.

No.	Pos.	Nation	Player
—	MF	ISL	Jón Gestur Ben Birgisson
—	DF	SEN	Maoudo Diallo
—	DF	TTO	Keston George
—	GK	POL	Jakub Górski
—	DF	ISL	Sindri Þór Guðmundsson
—	MF	ISL	Helgi Rúnar Hafsteinsson
—	DF	ISL	Viktor Guðberg Hauksson
—	MF	ISL	Alexander Helgason
—	GK	ISL	Anton Helgi Jóhannsson
—	MF	ISL	Óðinn Jóhannsson
—	DF	ISL	Benedikt Jónsson

No.	Pos.	Nation	Player
—	DF	POL	Hubert Kotus
—	MF	ISL	Magnús Magnússon
—	MF	ISL	Valur Þór Magnússon
—	MF	ISL	Sindri Lars Ómarsson
—	DF	SRB	Strahinja Pajić
—	DF	ESP	Alberto Sánchez Montilla
—	FW	MLI	Ismael Sidibé
—	FW	ISL	Bergþór Ingi Smárason
—	MF	ISL	Pálmar Sveinsson
—	FW	ISL	Kristófer Páll Viðarsson
—	MF	POL	Leonard Zmarzlik
