= David Grissom (basketball) =

Armenian and Icelandic basketball player

David Alan Grissom
Personal information
- Born: 16 August 1964 (age 62)
- Listed height: 6 ft 7 in (2.01 m)

Career information
- High school: Sabine (Liberty City, Texas)
- College: SPC (1984–1986); Old Dominion (1986–1988)
- Playing career: 1989–2000
- Position: Power forward

Career history

Playing
- 1989–1990: Reynir Sandgerði
- 1990–1991: Valur
- 1992: KR
- 1992–1993: Breiðablik
- 1993–1994: KR
- 1994–1996: Keflavík
- 1996–1997: Reynir Sandgerði
- 1998: Keflavík
- 1999–2000: ÍV

Coaching
- 1989–1990: Reynir Sandgerði
- 1996–1997: Reynir Sandgerði
- 1999–2000: ÍV

Career highlights
- Úrvalsdeild Domestic All-First Team (1994)

Career Úrvalsdeild karla statistics
- Points: 2,699 (18.6 ppg)
- Rebounds: 1,171 (8.1 rpg)
- Games: 145

David Alan Grissom (born 16 August 1964) is an American and Icelandic former basketball player and coach. He played college basketball for South Plains College in Texas and Old Dominion University in Virginia before playing and coaching professionally in Iceland for several years.

== High school ==
Grissom attended Sabine High School where he graduated in 1984. During his junior year, he averaged 23.4 points and 14.3 rebounds per game, leading the school to a 30–4 record and a State 2A tournament semi-final berth.

== Professional career ==
He started his professional career with Reynir Sandgerði during the 1989–1990 Úrvalsdeild karla season as a player-coach where he averaged a career high 23.7 points along with 9.4 rebounds. On 7 January 1990, Grissom scored a career high 47 point in a victory against Valur. The following season, Grissom played with Valur where he averaged 22.2 points and 7.4 rebounds in 26 games.

In March 1992, KR signed Grissom to replace Jon Baer. He played the last three regular season games for KR, where he averaged 18.3 points and 10.0 rebounds per game. In the playoffs, he averaged 15.7 points in KR's 1–2 first round loss against Keflavík. He trained with KR at the start of the 1992–1993 but did not appear in any games. By November, he had signed with Breiðablik. In December 1992, he received an Icelandic citizenship. Following the season, he returned to KR. For the 1993–1994 season, he averaged 22.4 points and a career high 10.1 rebounds per game and was named to the Úrvalsdeild Domestic All-First Team. Following the season, he signed with Keflavík where he played for two seasons, making the Úrvalsdeild finals second season.

After initially considering signing as a player-coach in Malta, Grissom returned to Reynir Sandgerði as a player-coach in August 1996.

Grissom was a player-coach for ÍV during the 1999–2000 season, averaging 18.3 points in 17 games in the 1. deild karla.

== Personal life ==
Grissom's son, Magni Þór Grissom, debuted with the Iceland U-18 team in July 2024.
