= Just Wingin' it =

Restaurant information
- Established: 2020
- Location: Garðabær, Iceland
- Website: justwinginit.is

Just Wingin' it is an Icelandic chicken wing restaurant. The restaurant chain was founded as a food truck in 2020 by former basketball players Justin Shouse and Lýður Vignisson. It originally operated in Ásgarður in Garðabær before moving around various places in Reykjavík as part of Reykjavík Street Food. In 2021, it opened a restaurant in Litlatún in Garðabær, and in 2022 another at Snorrabraut, Reykjavik.
