= Andri Rúnar Bjarnason =

Icelandic footballer

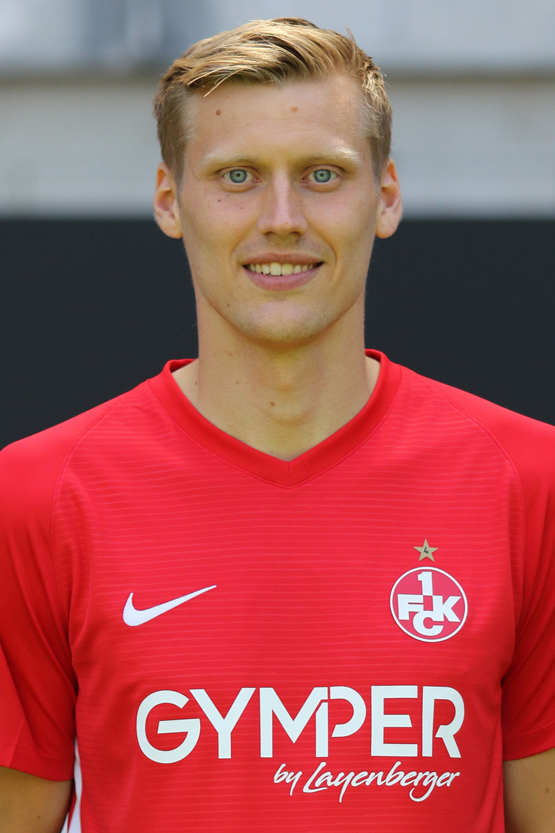
- Andri with 1. FC Kaiserslautern in July 2019

Personal information
- Full name: Andri Rúnar Bjarnason
- Date of birth: 12 November 1990 (age 36)
- Place of birth: Bolungarvík, Iceland
- Height: 1.93 m (6 ft 4 in)
- Position: Forward

Team information
- Current team: Stjarnan
- Number: 99

Youth career
- Bolungarvík

College career
Years	Team	Apps	(Gls)
2012–2013	NC Wesleyan Battling Bishops	15	(14)

Senior career*
Years	Team	Apps	(Gls)
2005	Bolungarvík	1	(0)
2006–2014	BÍ/Bolungarvík	164	(71)
2015–2016	Víkingur Reykjavík	18	(2)
2016	→ Grindavík	17	(7)
2017	Grindavík	22	(19)
2018–2019	Helsingborgs IF	35	(19)
2019–2020	1. FC Kaiserslautern	10	(0)
2020–2021	Esbjerg fB	25	(3)
2022–2023	ÍBV	25	(10)
2023–2024	Valur	21	(4)
2024–2025	Vestri	18	(8)
2025–	Stjarnan	49	(19)

International career^{‡}
2018–2019	Iceland	5	(1)
- * Club domestic league appearances and goals as of 16 November 2026 ‡ National team caps and goals as of 14 December 2021

Andri Rúnar Bjarnason (born 12 November 1990) is an Icelandic professional footballer who plays as a forward for Stjarnan. In 2017, he tied the Besta deild karla single season goal record with 19 goals. The following year, he debuted for the Iceland national team.

== Career ==
=== Early career ===
Andri started his career with his hometown club Ungmennafélag Bolungarvíkur in 2005. The next nine seasons, he played for BÍ/Bolungarvík, a joint team of Boltafélag Ísafjarðar and Ungmennafélag Bolungarvíkur. In 2015, he moved to Pepsi deildin club Víkingur Reykjavík. Between these moves Andri also attended college in the US and played with North Carolina Wesleyan College's soccer team where he was named USA South Rookie of the Year honors and to the All-South Atlantic Region Second Team.

=== Grindavík ===
In 2016, Andri joined Inkasso League's Grindavík on loan from Víkingur Reykjavík and helped the club achieve promotion to Úrvalsdeild karla. After the season he transferred to the club and in 2017 he took the Úrvalsdeild by storm, scoring 18 goals in his first 20 matches. On September 30, Andri tied the single season goal record in the Úrvalsdeild when he scored on the 88 minute in Grindavík's final game of the season.

=== Helsingborgs IF ===
On 4 November 2017, Andri signed for Helsingborgs IF. On 10 November 2018 he scored twice in Helsingborg's 3–1 victory against Varberg in the last game of the season, helping the club finish first in the Superettan. He also finished first in goals scored during the season with 16 goals. On 14 June it was reported that Helsinborgs had sold Andri to 1. FC Kaiserslautern.

=== 1. FC Kaiserslautern ===
On 17 June 2019, Andri signed for 1. FC Kaiserslautern.

=== Esbjerg fB ===
After a disappointing season in Germany, it was confirmed on 10 August 2020, that Andri had joined newly relegated Danish 1st Division club Esbjerg fB on a deal until the summer 2022. On 13 December 2021, Andri's contract was terminated by mutual consent.

=== Return to Iceland ===
In December 2021, Andri returned to Iceland and signed with ÍBV, scoring 10 goals in 25 matches during the 2022 season.

In February 2023, he joined Valur, where he spent a single season. Later that year, in October, he signed with newly promoted Vestri.

After a year with Vestri, he moved to Stjarnan in November 2024.

== International career ==
In January 2018, Andri was selected to the Icelandic national football team ahead of its two unofficial friendly matches in Indonesia. He played his first game for the national team on 11 January, scoring one goal in Iceland's 6–0 victory against Indonesia Selection in Maguwoharjo Stadium.

=== International goals ===
Scores and results list Iceland's goal tally first, score column indicates score after each Andri goal.

List of international goals scored by Andri Rúnar Bjarnason
#	Date	Venue	Opponent	Score	Result	Competition
1	11 January 2018	Maguwoharjo Stadium, Sleman, Indonesia	Indonesia Selection	1–0	6–0	Unofficial Friendly

== Honours ==
=== Club ===
- Superettan: 2018

=== Individual ===
- Superettan top goal scorer: 2018
- Úrvalsdeild karla top goal scorer: 2017
- 2. deild karla top goal scorer: 2010
