= Egilsstadir Upper Secondary School =

- Menntaskólinn á Egilsstöðum

Location
- Tjarnarbraut; Egilsstaðir, 700; Iceland
- Coordinates: 65.267°N 14.399°W

Information
- Established: 1979
- Website: http://www.me.is/

Egilsstadir Upper Secondary School (Icelandic: Menntaskólinn á Egilsstöðum) is a gymnasium (Icelandic: Menntaskóli) in the Eastern Region, Iceland

Egilsstadir Upper Secondary School was founded in 1979. For the first few years the school was housed in a building built in 1983 that now houses boarders. The official teaching block was opened in 1989, and in 2006 the school was further expanded. School students number over 300, including about 300 day students. The boarding house can accommodate about 120 students.

== Schoolmasters from 1979 ==
- 1979-1989: Vilhjálmur Einarsson
- 1990-1993: Helgi Ómar Bragason
- 1993-1994: Ólafur Jón Arnbjörnsson
- 1994-1995: Vilhjálmur Einarsson
- 1995-2008: Helgi Ómar Bragason
- 2008-2009: Þorbjörn Rúnarsson
- 2009-2016: Helgi Ómar Bragason
- 2016–present: Árni Ólason
