= Hruni =

Farming village in Iceland

Coordinates: 64°08′N 20°16′W

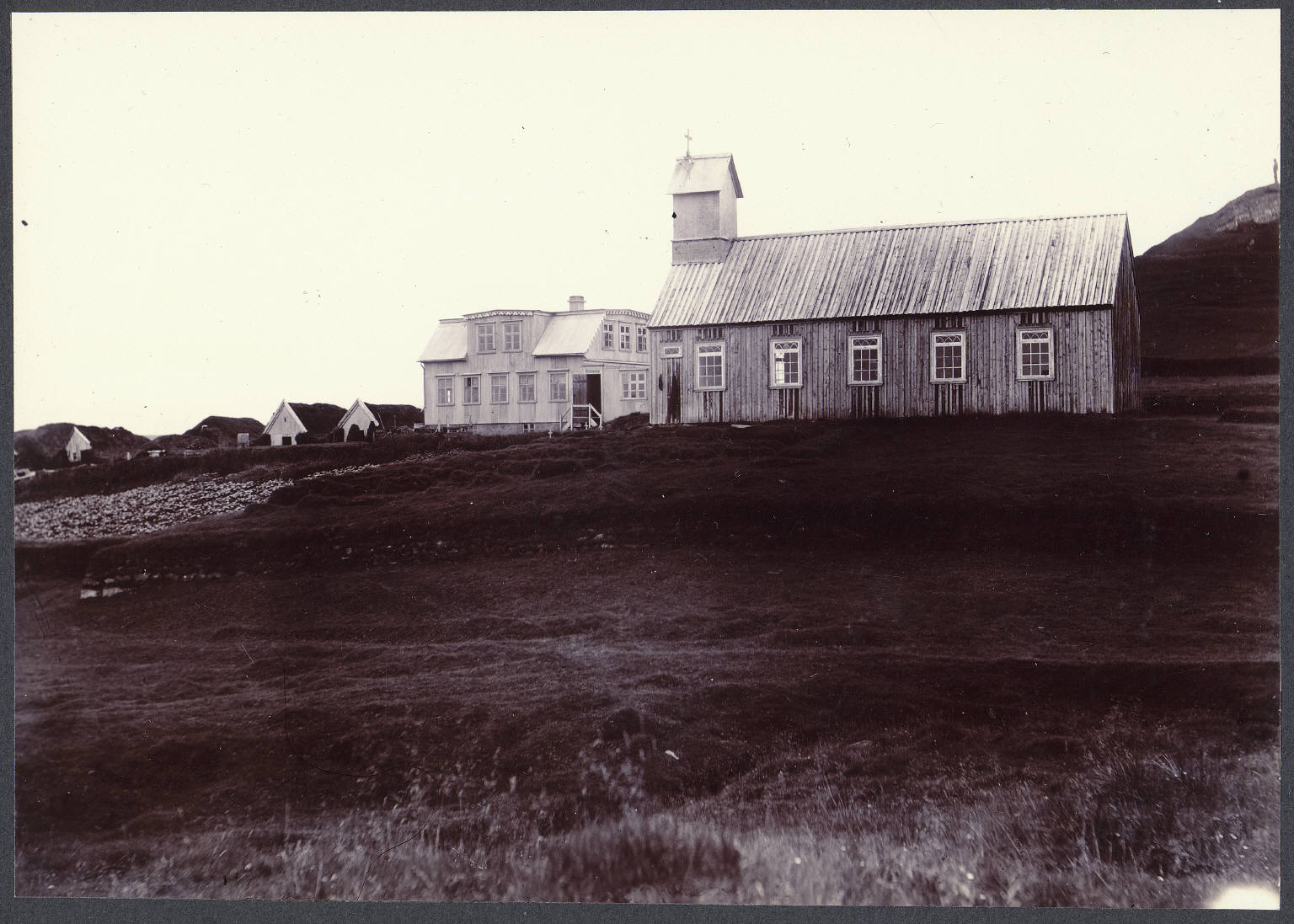
The church at Hruni around 1900

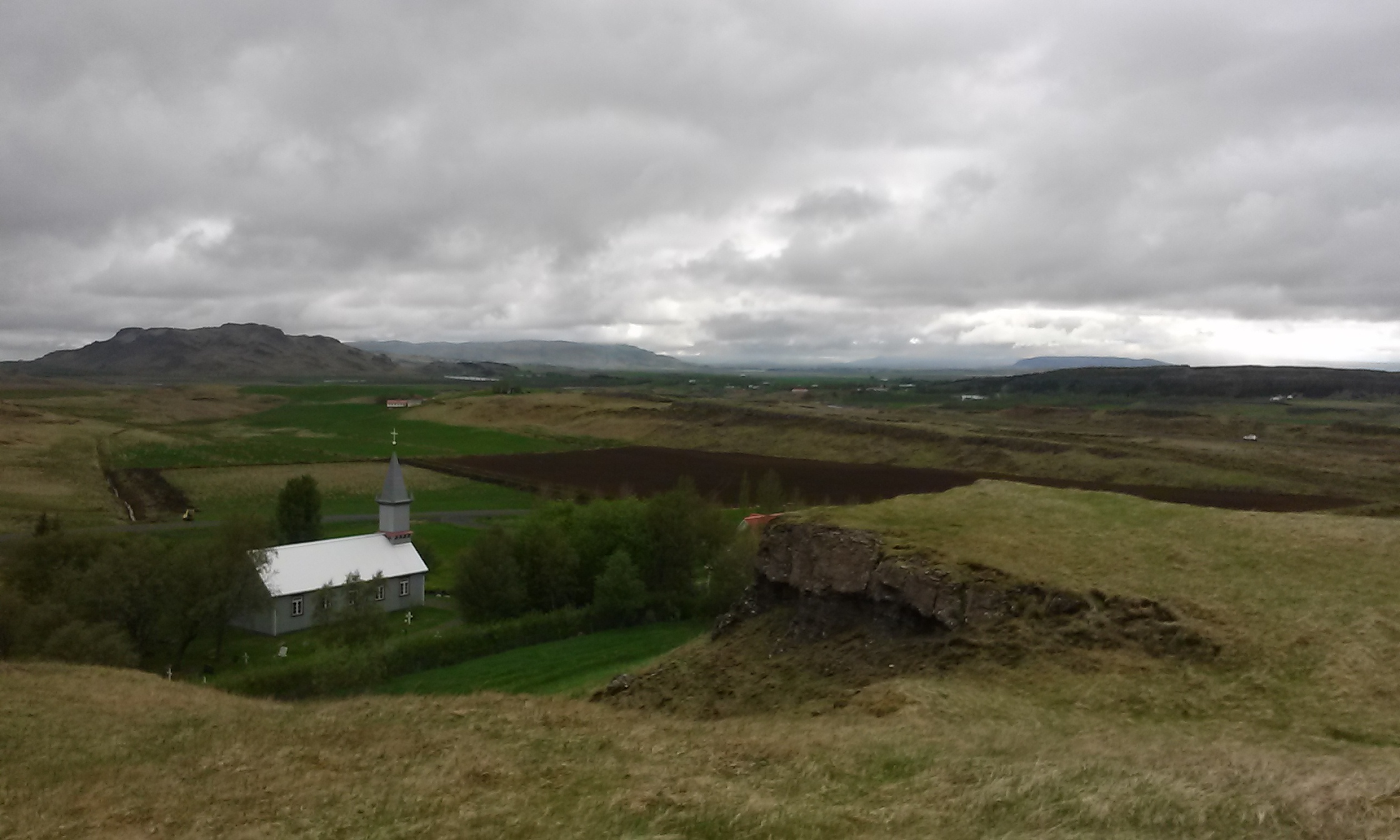
A view from a hill overlooking the Lutheran church at Hruni, Iceland.

Hruni (Icelandic pronunciation: [ˈr̥ʏːnɪ]) is a farming village located in the Hrunamannahreppur municipality in the Southern Region, Iceland.

== History ==
The settlement was home to the priest and scholar Árni Halldórsson of Hruni (1630–87).

The small church on the site was built in 1865. There is a folk tale that, when there was merrymaking in the church, the devil came to the party and destroyed it.
