= Flúðir =

- Village
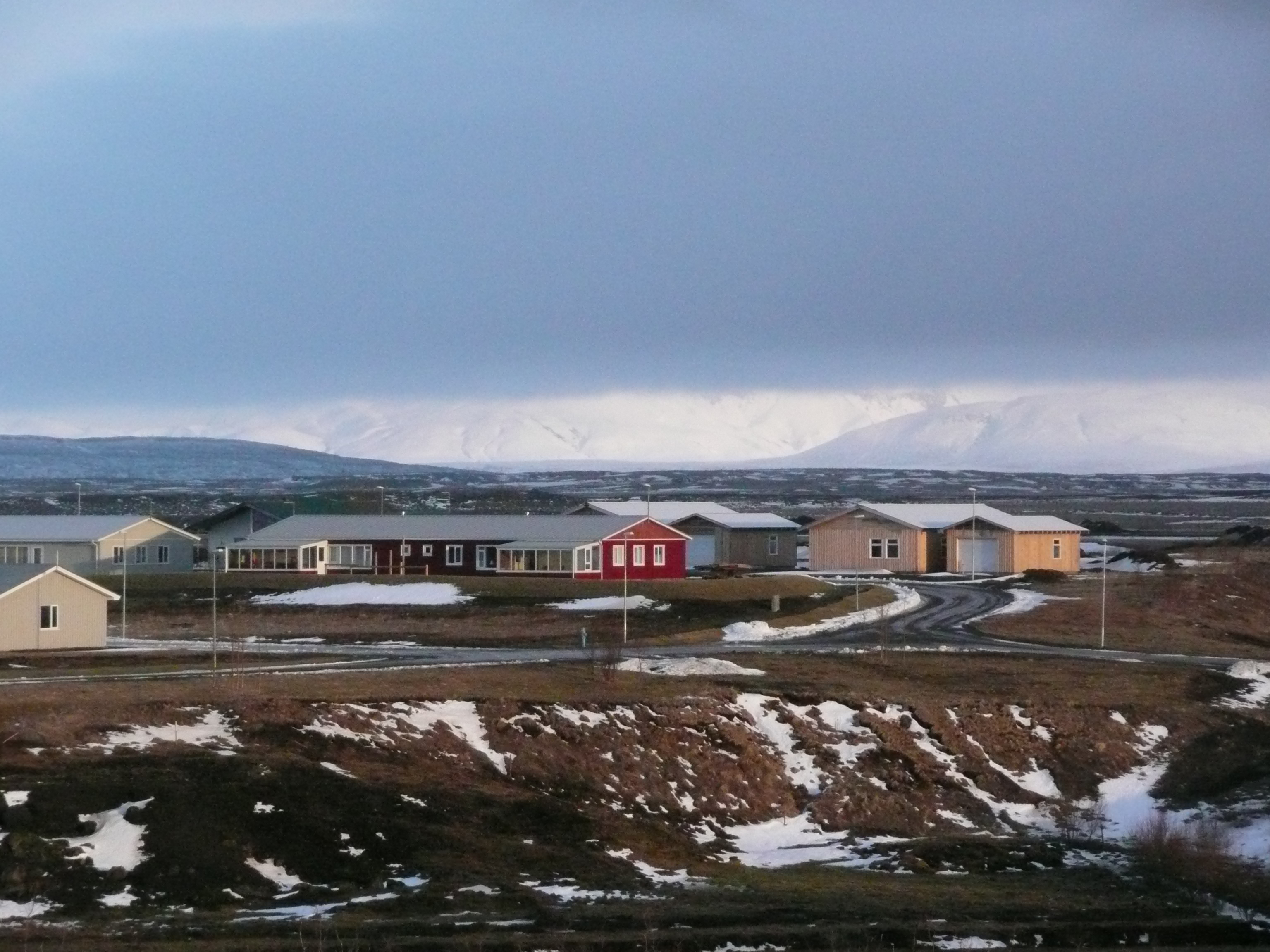
- Flúðir

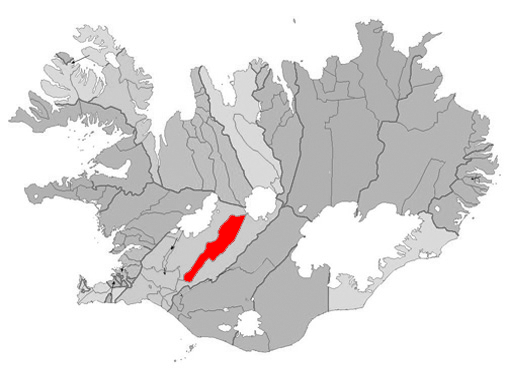
- Location of the Municipality of Hrunamannahreppur

- Location of Flúðir in Iceland
- Coordinates: 64°13′N 20°33′W
- Country: Iceland
- Constituency: South Constituency
- Region: Southern Region
- Municipality: Hrunamannahreppur

Population (2020)
  - Total: 818
- Time zone: UTC+0 (GMT)

Flúðir (Icelandic pronunciation: [ˈfluːðɪr̥], anglicised as Fludir) is a village located in the Hrunamannahreppur municipality in the Southern Region, Iceland. It has a population of 818 (as of January 2020). It is not far from Geysir (the first recorded geyser in history) and the Gullfoss waterfall.

== Notable sites ==
- Secret Lagoon (Gamla Laugin) geothermal pool
- Litla-Laxá spring river
- Miðfell hill
- Skalholt cathedral
- Fludir lifting stones at Mountain Villa
- Margrét's doll museum
- Selsvollur golf course
- Fludasveppir mushroom factory
- Folk museum at Grof
- Syðra-Langholt horse rental
- Friðheimar country-style restaurant
