= 2. deild karla (basketball) =

- Founded: 1973
- First season: 1973
- Country: Iceland
- Confederation: FIBA Europe
- Number of teams: 12
- Level on pyramid: 3
- Promotion to: 1. deild karla
- Relegation to: 3. deild karla
- Domestic cup(s): Bikarkeppni KKÍ
- Supercup: Meistarakeppni karla
- Current champions: Fylkir (2nd title)
- Most championships: Laugdælir, Ármann (4 titles)
- CEO: Hannes S. Jónsson
- Website: KKÍ.is

2. deild karla (English: Men's Second Division) or D2 is the third-tier basketball competition among clubs in Iceland. It is organized by the Icelandic Basketball Federation (Icelandic: Körfuknattleikssamband Íslands – KKÍ). It consists of 11 teams and the season consists of a home-and-away schedule of 20 games. The top four non-reserve teams meet in a playoff for the victory in the league and promotion to 1. deild karla.

== History ==
The third-tier league was founded in 1973 as 3. deild karla with 11 teams. In 1978 it was rebranded as 2. deild karla. On 13 March 2020, the 2019–20 season was postponed due to the coronavirus outbreak in Iceland. The day after, the Icelandic Basketball Federation canceled the rest of the season.

== Champions ==
Season	Winner	Runner-up	Score
1973–74	Fram Reykjavík	---	---
1974–75	KFÍ	Breiðablik (Note: KFÍ, Breiðablik and Eiðar played a three team finals. KFÍ won both its games and Breiðablik beat Eiðar.)	---
1975–76	Laugdælir	Tindastóll	72-50
1976–77	ÍV (now ÍBV)	---	---
1977–78	Keflavík	---	---
1978–79	Skallagrímur	---	---
1979–80	KFÍ (2)	Haukar	79-78
1980–81	Haukar	---	---
1981–82	Þór Akureyri	---	---
1982–83	Laugdælir (2)	---	---
1983–84	Reynir Sandgerði	---	---
1984–85	Breiðablik	---	---
1985–86	Tindastóll	Skallagrímur	95-63
1986–87	UÍA	---	---
1990–91	Keilufélag Reykjavíkur	Gnúpverjar	69-61
1991–92	Bolungarvík (Note: ÍFL had originally defeated Bolungarvík during the group stage of the playoffs and Gnúpverjar in the finals. However, ÍFL had used an illegal player and as an result of an official complaint, Bolungarvík was awarded a 2–0 victory which meant they finished with the best record in their group and faced Gnúpverjar in the finals rematch.)	Gnúpverjar	68-54
1992–93	ÍKÍ	Leiknir Reykjavík	69-58
1993–94	KFÍ (3)	Þór Þorlákshöfn	75-48
1994–95	Stjarnan	---	---
1995–96	Stafholtstungur	Bresi Akranes	103-89
1996–97	Hamar	Laugdælir	82-71
1997–98	Fylkir	ÍV (now ÍBV)	68-85
1998–99	ÍV (now ÍBV) (2)	Fjölnir	65-54
1999-00	Ármann	Fjölnir	62-70
2000–01	Reynir Sandgerði (2)	Íþróttafélag Grindavíkur	86-66
2001–02	Fjölnir	ÍV (now ÍBV)	86-84
2002–03	Þór Akureyri (2)	Íþróttafélag Grindavíkur	94-91
2003–04	Ungmennafélagið Drangur	ÍA	79-68
2004–05	Héraðssambandið Hrafna-Flóki	Reynir Sandgerði	84-62
2005–06	Ármann (2)	Íþróttafélag Grindavíkur	71-63
2006–07	Þróttur Vogum	Reynir Sandgerði	105-102
2007–08	Hrunamenn	Laugdælir	83-77
2008–09	ÍA	Íþróttafélag Grindavíkur	89-77
2009–10	Laugdælir (3)	Leiknir Reykjavík	84-76
2010–11	Íþróttafélag Grindavíkur	ÍA	95-82
2011–12	Augnablik	Reynir Sandgerði	89-80
2012–13	Vængir Júpiters	Mostri	72-57
2013–14	Íþróttafélag Grindavíkur (2)	Álftanes	92-89
2014–15	Ármann (3)	Reynir Sandgerði	83-78
2015–16	Leiknir Reykjavík	KV	99-68
2016–17	Hrunamenn/Laugdælir (Hrunamenn 2, Laugdælir 4)	Gnúpverjar	101-73
2017–18	Ungmennafélagið Sindri (1)	KV	82-77
2018–19	Álftanes (1)	ÍA	123-100
2019–20	Season canceled due to COVID-19 outbreak. (Note: KR-b had the best record at the time of cancelation, with 16 wins in 19 games. KV had the best record of non-reserve teams with 14 victories in 17 games.)		
2020–21	Reynir Sandgerði (3)	ÍA	107-95
2021–22	Ármann (4)	Þróttur Vogum	2-0 (Note: Best of three playoff series. Ármann won 102-77 and 103-73.)
2022–23	Þróttur Vogum (2)	Snæfell	2-0 (Note: Best of three playoff series. Þróttur won 106-95 and 108-78.)
2023–24	KV	Vestri	2-0 (Note: Best of three playoff series. KV won 94-71 and 95-75.)
2024–25	Fylkir	Aþena/Leiknir R.	2-0 (Note: Best of three playoff series. Fylkir won 96-80 and 98-78.)

== Titles per club ==
Titles	Club
4	Laugdælir, Ármann
3	Reynir Sandgerði, KFÍ (now Vestri)
2	Þór Akureyri, Fylkir, ÍV (now ÍBV), ÍG, Hrunamenn, Þróttur Vogum
1	Augnablik, ÍA, HHF, Drangur, Fjölnir, Hamar, Stafholtstungur, Stjarnan, ÍKÍ, Bolungarvík, Keilufélag Reykjavíkur, UÍA, Breiðablik, Haukar, Skallagrímur, Keflavík, Fram Reykjavík, Leiknir Reykjavík, Ungmennafélagið Sindri, Álftanes, KV
