= Hamar (men's basketball) =

- Leagues: 1. deild karla
- Founded: 10 September 1992
- History: Hamar (1992–2004); Hamar/Selfoss; 2004–2007; Hamar (2007–present)
- Arena: Frystikistan
- Location: Hveragerði, Iceland
- Team colors: Blue, white
- Head coach: Rui Costa
- Website: Hamarsport.is

The Hamar men's basketball team, commonly known as Hamar, is the men's basketball department of Íþróttafélagið Hamar. It was founded on 10 September 1992.

== History ==
Hamar first fielded a men's team during the 1993–1994 season when it participated in 2. deild karla. After three seasons in the 2. deild, Hamar won the league in 1997 and was promoted to 1. deild karla. During its first season in 1. deild, the team finished 5th in the league. During the summer, Hamar hired former Icelandic international player Pétur Ingvarsson as its player-coach. Behind his and star player Oleg Krijanovskij play, Hamar finished fourth in the league and made it to the playoffs. In the semi-finals, Hamar defeated Þór Þorlákshöfn 2-1 and advanced to the finals where it faced former Úrvalsdeild powerhouse Íþróttafélag Reykjavíkur. After losing the first game, 102–90, Hamar went on a won the next two for the 1. deild championship and promotion to the top-tier Úrvalsdeild karla.

In April 2023, Hamar achieved promotion to the Úrvalsdeild after defeating Skallagrímur 3–2 in the 1. deild promotion playoffs.

== Trophies and achievements ==
- Icelandic First Division (2):
  - 1998-99, 2008–09
- Icelandic Second Division (1):
  - 1996-97

== Notable players ==
Note: Flags indicate national team eligibility at FIBA-sanctioned events. Players may hold other non-FIBA nationalities not displayed.

Criteria

To appear in this section a player must have either:

- Set a club record or won an individual award while at the club
- Played at least one official international match for their national team at any time
- Played at least one official NBA match at any time.

- (United States) Andre Dabney
- (Iceland) Danero Thomas
- (England) David Aliu
- (Iceland) Fannar Ólafsson
- (United States) Everage Richardson
- (United States) Dee Franklin
- (Canada) Keith Vassell
- (Iceland) Lárus Jónsson
- (Iceland) Marvin Valdimarsson
- (Ukraine) Oleg Kriszhanovskij
- (Iceland) Ragnar Nathanaelsson

== Coaches ==
- (Iceland) Pétur Ingvarsson 1999–2007
- (Iceland) Ágúst Björgvinsson 2007–2011
- (Iceland) Lárus Jónsson 2011–2013
- (Iceland) Daði Steinn Arnarsson 2013–2014
- (Iceland) Ari Gunnarsson 2014
- (Iceland) Hallgrímur Brynjólfsson 2014–2015
- (Iceland) Andri Þór Kristinsson 2016
- (Iceland) Pétur Ingvarsson 2016–2018
- (Iceland) Máté Dalmey 2018–2021
- (Portugal) Rui Costa 2021–2022
- (Iceland) Halldór Karl Þórsson 2022–2025
- (Iceland) Daði Berg Grétarsson 2025–2026
