= Ungmennafélag Álftaness =

Sports club of Iceland

Álftanes
- Full name: Ungmennafélag Álftaness
- Sports: Basketball, Football, Golf, Track and field, Volleyball
- Founded: 1946
- Team history: Ungmennafélag Bessastaðahrepps; 1946–2004; Ungmennafélag Álftaness; 2004–present
- Based in: Álftanes, Iceland
- Colours: Red, White, Blue
- Website: umfa.is

Ungmennafélag Álftaness (Icelandic pronunciation: [ˈuŋkˌmɛnːaˌfjɛːˌlaːɣ ˈaul̥taˌnɛs], lit. 'Álftanes Youth Club'), also known as Álftanes, is a multi-sports club in Álftanes, Iceland. It has active departments in basketball, football, golf, track and field and volleyball.

== History ==
The club was founded in 1946 as Ungmennafélag Bessastaðahrepps. In 2004 it changed its name to Ungmennafélag Álftaness, or Álftanes for short.

== Home court ==
The home court of the club is Íþróttamiðstöð Álftaness. Its indoor arena is commonly known as Forsetahöllin (English: The President's Palace) while its football field is known as the Forsetavöllurinn (English: The President's field).

== Basketball ==
Álftanes basketball was founded in 2007. In 2023, its men's team won promotion to the Icelandic top-tier Úrvalsdeild karla for the first time in its history.

== Football ==
=== Men's football ===
Álftanes men's football team plays in 3. deild karla as of 2026.

==== Trophies and achievements ====
- 4. deild karla
  - Winners: 2014,2026
- 5. deild karla
  - Winners: 2024

=== Women's football ===
Álftanes women's football team plays in 2. deild kvenna as of 2021.

== Volleyball ==
Álftanes women's volleyball team has played in the top tier Úrvalsdeild since the 2018–2019 season. The team's best season was during the 2022–2023 season when the team finished second in the league.
