= Spanish basketball league system =

Series of connected competitions

The Spanish basketball league system is a series of connected competitions for professional basketball clubs in Spain. The system has a hierarchical format with a promotion and relegation system between competitions at different levels.

== Men ==
There are currently four different nation-wide leagues in the system - the 1st tier Liga ACB, the 2nd tier Primera FEB, the 3rd tier Segunda FEB, and the 4th tier Tercera FEB.

Liga ACB is organized by the Asociación de Clubs de Baloncesto (Basketball Clubs Association), which is a private organization. LEB leagues and Liga EBA are organized by the Spanish Basketball Federation while the lower tiers are organized by the regional federations.

=== Levels ===
For the 2018–19 season, the Spanish basketball league system is as follows:

Level	League				
1	Liga ACB (18 teams) (previously Liga Nacional)				
2	Primera FEB; Formerly LEB Oro (18 teams)				
3	Segunda FEB; Formerly LEB Plata (24 teams)				
4	Tercera FEB Group A Formerly Liga EBA (Asturias) (Basque Country (autonomous community)) (Cantabria) (Castile and León) (Galicia (Spain)) (Navarre) (La Rioja) (2 sub-groups of 14 teams each)	Tercera FEB Group B Formerly Liga EBA (Canary Islands) (Castilla–La Mancha) (Community of Madrid) (16 teams)	Tercera FEB Group C Formerly Liga EBA (Aragon) (Balearic Islands) (Catalonia) (2 sub-groups of 14 teams each)	Tercera FEB Group D Formerly Liga EBA (Andalusia) (Ceuta) (Extremadura) (Melilla) (2 sub-groups of 10 teams each)	Tercera FEB Group E Formerly Liga EBA (Region of Murcia) (Valencian Community) (16 teams)
5	Primera División (15 groups, one for each autonomous community except Basque Country, La Rioja, and Navarra, who share the same group; in Catalonia, known as Copa Catalunya)				
	Regional and lower divisions				

==== Lower divisions ====
For the 2015–16 season, the lower divisions for each of the Autonomous Communities is as follows:

Community	Level 5	Level 6	Level 7	Level 8	Level 9
Andalusia	1ª División (2 groups of 10 teams)	Provincial leagues			
Aragon	1ª División (8 teams)	1ª Aragonesa (8 teams)	2ª Aragonesa (28 teams)	3ª Aragonesa (3 groups of 7 teams)	Provincial leagues
Asturias	1ª División (11 teams)	1ª Autonómica (12 teams)	2ª Autonómica (9 teams)	3ª Autonómica (10 teams)	None
Balearic Islands	1ª División (11 teams)	Insular leagues			
(Basque Country (autonomous community)) Basque Country	1ª División (14 teams)	2ª División (14 teams)	Provincial leagues		
La Rioja	1ª División (14 teams)	2ª Interautonómica (14 teams)	Sénior Masculina (9 teams)	None	
Navarre	1ª División (14 teams)	2ª Interautonómica (14 teams)	1ª Autonómica (11 teams)	2ª Autonómica (12 teams)	None
Canary Islands	1ª División (9 teams)	Provincial and insular leagues			
Cantabria	1ª División (8 teams)	1ª Autonómica (8 teams)	2ª Autonómica (7 teams)	None	
Castile and León	1ª División (9 teams)	Provincial leagues			
(Castilla–La Mancha) Castile-La Mancha	1ª División (2 groups of 8 teams)	Provincial leagues			
Catalonia	Copa Catalunya (2 groups of 14 teams)	CC 1ª Categoria (3 groups of 16 teams)	CC 2ª Categoria (4 groups of 16 teams)	CC 3ª Categoria (8 groups of 16 teams)	Provincial leagues
Community of Madrid	1ª División (24 teams)	1ª Autonómica A (24 teams)	1ª Autonómica B (24 teams)	2ª Autonómica	Local leagues
Extremadura	1ª División (7 teams)	Provincial leagues			
(Galicia (Spain)) Galicia	1ª División (17 teams in 2 groups)	2ª División (2 groups of 7 teams)	3ª División (79 teams in 10 groups)	None	
Region of Murcia	1ª División (12 teams)	1ª Autonómica (8 teams)	2ª Autonómica (8 teams)	None	
Valencian Community	1ª División (2 groups of 12 teams)	Sénior Autonómico (3 groups of 14 teams)	Sénior Preferente (55 teams in 4 groups)	1ª Zonal (69 teams in 5 groups)	2ª Zonal (72 teams in 6 groups)

=== Evolution of the Spanish basketball league system ===
Tier\Years	1957–78	1978–83	1983–88	1988–94	1994–96	1996–2000	2000–07	2007–09	2009–
1	1ª División		ACB						
2	2ª División	1ª División B		1ª División	EBA	LEB		LEB Oro	
3	3ª División	2ª División				EBA	LEB 2	LEB Plata	
4	Lower	3ª División	Lower	Lower	Lower	2ª División	EBA	LEB Bronce	EBA
5	Lower	Lower	Lower	Lower	Lower	Lower	1ª División	EBA	1ª División
6	Lower	Lower	Lower	Lower	Lower	Lower	Lower	1ª División	Lower
7	Lower	Lower	Lower	Lower	Lower	Lower	Lower	Lower	Lower

=== Other competitions ===
- Spanish King's Cup
- Spanish Supercup

== Women ==
Since the 2001–02 season, there are currently different competitions on the pyramid.

1. Liga Femenina de Baloncesto, organized by the Spanish Basketball Federation and composed by 14 teams.
2. Liga Femenina 2, composed by 28 teams divided into two groups and also organized by the Spanish Basketball Federation.
3. Primera División Femenina, where teams are divided into several inter-Regional groups. This competition is co-organized by the Regional Federations.
4. Regional Leagues.

Level	League				
1	Liga Femenina (14 teams)				
2	Liga Femenina 2 Group A (14 teams)			Liga Femenina 2 Group B (14 teams)	
3	1ª División Group A (Asturias) (Cantabria) (Castile and León) (Galicia (Spain))	1ª División Group B (Aragon) (Basque Country (autonomous community)) (La Rioja) (Navarre)	1ª División Group C (Balearic Islands) (Catalonia)	1ª División Group D (Castilla–La Mancha) (Community of Madrid) (Region of Murcia) (Valencian Community)	1ª División Group E (Andalusia) (Canary Islands) (Ceuta) (Extremadura) (Melilla)
4	Regional divisions				
