= League system =

Method of organizing teams based on performance

A league system is a hierarchy of leagues in a sport. They are often called pyramids, due to their tendency to split into an increasing number of regional divisions further down the system. League systems of some sort are used in many sports in many countries.

== Overview ==
In association football, rugby union, rugby league and Gaelic games, league systems are usually connected by the process of promotion and relegation, in which teams from a lower division who finish at the top of the standings in their league are promoted (advanced to the next level of the system) while teams who finish lowest in their division are relegated (move down to a lower division). This process can be automatic each year, can require playoffs, or be a combination of both.

In the United States and Canada, league systems in the most popular sports do not use promotion or relegation. Most professional sports are divided into major and minor leagues. Baseball and association football (known as soccer in North America) have well-defined pyramid shapes to their minor league hierarchies, each managed by a governing body (Minor League Baseball, an organization under the authority of the Commissioner of Baseball, governs baseball leagues; the United States Soccer Federation designates the American soccer pyramid.) Ice hockey's professional minor league system is linear, with one league at most of the four levels of the game; the ice hockey league system in North America is governed by collective bargaining agreements and affiliation deals between the NHL, AHL and ECHL.

Gridiron football does not operate on a league system. Different professional leagues play by very different sets of rules in different seasons (the NFL plays 11-a-side on a 100-yard field in autumn and early winter, the CFL uses 12-a-side on a 110-yard field in summer and early fall, while arena football and the minor indoor leagues each play 8-a-side on a 50-yard field in the spring and early summer). There have been attempts at forming true minor leagues for the professional game (most recently with the United Football League in 2024, formed as a merger between the second incarnations of the XFL and USFL); none so far have been able to balance the major leagues' requests with the ability to maintain financial solvency.

In motorsport, the most notable discipline with a league format is motorcycle speedway, with the main leagues being the British SGB Premiership, the Polish Ekstraliga, the Swedish Elitserien and the Danish Speedway League.

== Impact ==
League systems can have a negative effect on competitive balance, particularly in European professional football.

== See also ==
- Group tournaments
- List of professional sports leagues
