= 1. deild karla (basketball) =

Iceland's second category in basketball

- Founded: 1964 (as 2. deild karla); 1978 (as 1. deild karla)
- First season: 1964
- Country: Iceland
- Confederation: FIBA Europe
- Number of teams: 12
- Level on pyramid: 2
- Promotion to: Úrvalsdeild
- Relegation to: 2. deild karla
- Domestic cup: Bikarkeppni KKÍ
- Supercup: Meistarakeppni karla
- Most championships: Þór Akureyri (7 titles)
- TV partners: Stöð 2 Sport
- Website: KKÍ.is

1. deild karla (English: Men's First Division) or D1 is the second-tier basketball competition among clubs in Iceland. It is organized by the Icelandic Basketball Federation (Icelandic: Körfuknattleikssamband Íslands - KKÍ). The season consists of a home-and-away schedule of 18 games, followed by a four-team playoff round. Both semifinals and finals series are best-of-three. The top team from the regular-season phase and the four-team playoff round winner are promoted to the Úrvalsdeild karla. The bottom club is relegated, and replaced by the four-team playoff round winner of the third-tier 2. deild karla.

== History ==
=== Creation ===
The 1. deild karla was founded in 1964. Up until 1978 it was known as 2. deild karla.

=== ÍS and ÍKF's dominance ===
For the first years, from its foundation in 1964 until the 1970–71 season, the 1. deild was led by the ÍS (with three wins) and ÍKF (with two wins).

=== Fram Reykjavík's leadership ===
Some years later, from the 1974–75 season, Fram Reykjavík started their leadership on the 1. deild and their series of wins, which ended in the 1985–86 season when they won their fourth title.

=== Danny Shouse ===
In 1979, Danny Shouse joined Ármann and took the league by storm. On December 1, 1979, Shouse scored 100 points against Skallagrímur, setting the Icelandic single-game scoring record. In January 1980 he scored 76 points in an overtime loss against Grindavík and in February he broke the 70 point barrier again, scoring 72 points against Þór Akureyri. His scoring prowess helped Ármann win the league and achieve promotion to the Úrvalsdeild karla. Even though Shouse played in the nation's tier 2 league during his first season, he was widely regarded as one of the best players in the country.

=== The double fall of ÍR ===
After their golden years, in which they won 15 Úrvalsdeild karla titles in less than 25 years, the ÍR was relegated to the First Division. In the 1986–87 season they won the 1. deild for their first time and came back to the Úrvalsdeild karla. Afterwards, the ÍR was relegated again to the 1. deild. In the 1999–00 season they won their second 1. deild title and came back to the Úrvalsdeild karla.

=== Modern era ===
In the 2006–07 season, Þór Akureyri won their fifth title. In the following season, the 2007–08 season, Breiðablik also won their fifth title, becoming the most successful franchise together with Þór Akureyri. In the 2011–12 season, KFÍ won their fourth title.

On 13 March 2020, the rest of the 2019–20 season was postponed due to the coronavirus outbreak in Iceland.

== Champions ==
Season	Champion	Playoff winner	Playoff runner-up
1964-65	ÍKF	---	---
1965-66	ÍS	---	---
1966-67	Þór Akureyri	---	---
1967-68	ÍS (2)	---	---
1968-69	ÍKF (2)	---	---
1969-70	HSK	---	---
1970-71	ÍS (3)	---	---
1971-72	Njarðvík	---	---
1972-73	Skallagrímur	---	---
1973-74	Snæfell	---	---
1974-75	Fram Reykjavík	---	---
1975-76	Breiðablik	---	---
1976-77	Þór Akureyri (2)	---	---
1977-78	Snæfell (2)	---	---
1978-79	Fram Reykjavík (2)	---	---
1979-80	Ármann	---	---
1980-81	Fram Reykjavík (3)	---	---
1981-82	Keflavík	---	---
1982-83	Haukar	---	---
1983-84	ÍS (4)	---	---
1984-85	Keflavík (2)	---	---
1985-86	Fram Reykjavík (4)	---	---
1986-87	ÍR	---	---
1987-88	Tindastóll	---	---
1988-89	Reynir Sandgerði	---	---
1989-90	Snæfell (3)	---	---
1990-91	Skallagrímur (2)	---	---
1991-92	Breiðablik (2)	---	---
1992-93	ÍA	---	---
1993-94	Þór Akureyri (3)	---	---
1994-95	Breiðablik (3)	---	---
1995-96	KFÍ	---	---
1996-97	Valur	---	---
1997-98	Snæfell (4)	---	---
1998-99	Hamar	---	---
1999-00	ÍR (2)	---	---
2000-01	Breiðablik (4)	---	---
2001-02	Valur (2)	---	---
2002-03	KFÍ (2)	---	---
2003-04	Skallagrímur (3)	---	---
2004-05	Þór Akureyri (4)	---	---
2005-06	Tindastóll (2)	---	---
2006-07	Þór Akureyri (5)	---	---
2007-08	Breiðablik (5)	---	---
2008-09	Hamar (2)	---	---
2009-10	KFÍ (3)	---	---
2010-11	Þór Þorlákshöfn	Valur	Þór Akureyri
2011-12	KFÍ (4)	Skallagrímur	ÍA
2012-13	Haukar (2)	Valur	Hamar
2013-14	Tindastóll (3)	Fjölnir	Höttur
2014-15	Höttur	FSu	Hamar
2015-16	Þór Akureyri (6)	Skallagrímur	Fjölnir
2016-17	Höttur (2)	Valur	Hamar
2017-18	Skallagrímur	Breiðablik	Hamar
2018-19	Þór Akureyri (7)	Fjölnir	Hamar
2019-20	Höttur (3)	Canceled due to the coronavirus outbreak in Iceland	
2020-21	Breiðablik (6)	Vestri	Hamar
2021-22	Haukar (3)	Höttur	Álftanes
2022-23	Álftanes	Hamar	Skallagrímur
2023-24	KR (1)	ÍR	Sindri
2024-25	ÍA (2)	Ármann	Hamar
2025-26	Höttur (4)	‘’’Sindri’’’	TBD

== Titles per club ==
Titles	Club
7	Þór Akureyri
6	Breiðablik
4	KFÍ, Snæfell, Fram Reykjavík, Skallagrímur, ÍS, Höttur
3	Haukar, Njarðvík / ÍKF^{1}, Tindastóll, ÍR
2	Hamar, ÍA, Keflavík, Haukar, Valur
1	Þór Þorlákshöfn, Reynir Sandgerði, Ármann, KR, HSK

1. ÍKF merged into Ungmennafélag Njarðvíkur in 1969 and became its basketball subdivision. It is today known as Njarðvík. The club won 2 titles under the ÍKF name and has added 1 more after the merger

== Awards and honors ==
=== Individual awards ===
Season	Domestic MVP	Foreign MVP	Defense Player of The Year	Young Player of The Year	Coach of The Year	
2022–23	(Iceland) Dúi Þór Jónsson	(United States) Keith Jordan Jr.	(Iceland) Ragnar Nathanaelsson	(Iceland) Ísak Júlíus Perdue	(Iceland) Kjartan Atli Kjartansson	Álftanes
2021–22	(Iceland) Eysteinn Bjarni Ævarsson	(United States) Detrek Marqual Browning		(Iceland) Daníel Ágúst Halldórsson	(Iceland) Máté Dalmay	Haukar
2020–21	(Iceland) Árni Elmar Hrafnsson	(Spain) Jose Medina Aldana		(Iceland) Sveinn Búi Birgisson	(Iceland) Pétur Ingvarsson	Breiðablik
2019–20	Season canceled in March 2020 due to the coronavirus outbreak in Iceland					
2018–19	(Iceland) Róbert Sigurðsson	(United States) Larry Thomas		(Iceland) Júlíus Orri Ágústsson	(Iceland) Lárus Jónsson	Þór Akureyri
2017–18	(Iceland) Eyjólfur Ásberg Halldórsson			(Iceland) Sigvaldi Eggertsson	(Iceland) Finnur Jónsson	Skallagrímur
2016–17	(Iceland) Róbert Sigurðsson			(Iceland) Hilmar Pétursson	(Iceland) Viðar Örn Hafsteinsson	Höttur
2015–16	(Iceland) Sigtryggur Arnar Björnsson			(Iceland) Tryggvi Hlinason	(Iceland) Finnur Jónsson	Skallagrímur
2014–15	(Iceland) Ari Gylfason			(Iceland) Erlendur Ágúst Stefánsson	(Iceland) Viðar Örn Hafsteinsson	Höttur
...
2009–10	(Iceland) Grétar Erlendsson				(Iceland) Borce Ilievski	KFÍ
2008–09	(Iceland) Marvin Valdimarsson				(Iceland) Bárður Eyþórsson	Fjölnir
2007–08	(Iceland) Kristján Rúnar Sigurðsson				(Iceland) Einar Árni Jóhannsson	Breiðablik
...
1998–99	(Iceland) Pétur Ingvarsson	(United States) Billy Dreher			(United States) Billy Dreher	Þór Þorlákshöfn
1997–98	(Iceland) Birgir Mikaelsson	(United States) Clifton Bush			(Iceland) Torfi Magnússon	Snæfell
1996–97	(Iceland) Ragnar Þór Jónsson	(United States) Dalon Bynum			(Iceland) Birgir Mikaelsson	Valur

=== Domestic All-First team ===
Season	Domestic First team	
Season	Players	Teams
2022–23	Dúi Þór Jónsson	Álftanes
2022–23	Björn Ásgeir Ásgeirsson	Hamar
2022–23	Björgvin Hafþór Ríkharðsson	Skallagrímur
2022–23	Eysteinn Bjarni Ævarsson	Álftanes
2022–23	Ragnar Nathanaelsson	Hamar
2021–22	Daníel Ágúst Halldórsson	Fjölnir
2021–22	Eysteinn Bjarni Ævarsson	Álftanes
2021–22	Orri Gunnarsson	Haukar
2021–22	Friðrik Anton Jónsson	Breiðablik
2021–22	Ólafur Ingi Styrmisson	Álftanes
2020–21	Árni Elmar Hrafnsson	Breiðablik
2020–21	Róbert Sigurðsson	Álftanes
2020–21	Ragnar Jósef Ragnarsson	Hamar
2020–21	Snorri Vignisson	Breiðablik
2020–21	Sveinbjörn Jóhannesson	Breiðablik
2019–20	Season canceled in March 2020 due to the coronavirus outbreak in Iceland	
2018–19	Júlíus Orri Ágústsson	Þór Akureyri
2018–19	Róbert Sigurðsson	Fjölnir
2018–19	Eysteinn Ævarsson	Höttur
2018–19	Snjólfur Marel Stefánsson	Selfoss
2018–19	Pálmi Geir Jónsson	Þór Akureyri
2017–18	Eyjólfur Ásberg Halldórsson	Skallagrímur
2017–18	Snorri Vignisson	Breiðablik
2017–18	Sigvaldi Eggertsson	Fjölnir
2017–18	Bjarni Guðmann Jónsson	Skallagrímur
2017–18	Jón Arnór Sverrisson	Hamar
2016–17	Róbert Sigurðsson	Fjölnir
2016–17	Austin Magnús Bracey	Valur
2016–17	Ragnar Gerald Albertsson	Höttur
2016–17	Örn Sigurðarson	Hamar
2016–17	Mirko Stefán Virijevic	Höttur
2015–16	Ragnar Friðriksson	Þór Akureyri
2015–16	Sigtryggur Arnar Björnsson	Skallagrímur
2015–16	Róbert Sigurðsson	Fjölnir
2015–16	Illugi Auðunsson	Valur
2015–16	Tryggvi Hlinason	Þór Akureyri
2014–15	Hlynur Hreinsson	FSu
2014–15	Ari Gylfason	FSu
2014–15	Hreinn Gunnar Birgisson	Höttur
2014–15	Fannar Freyr Helgason	ÍA
2014–15	Örn Sigurðarson	Hamar
...
2009–10	Sævar Haraldsson	Haukar
2009–10	Baldur Þór Ragnarsson	Þór Þorlákshöfn
2009–10	Hörður Hreiðarsson	Valur
2009–10	Óðinn Ásgeirsson	Þór Akureyri
2009–10	Grétar Erlendsson	Þór Þorlákshöfn
2008–09	Marvin Valdimarsson	Hamar
2008–09	Svavar Páll Pálsson	Hamar
2008–09	Ægir Þór Steinarsson	Fjölnir
2008–09	Haukur Helgi Pálsson	Fjölnir
2008–09	Sveinn Ómar Sveinsson	Haukar
2007–08	Rúnar Ingi Erlingsson	Breiðablik
2007–08	Kristján Rúnar Sigurðsson	Breiðablik
2007–08	Árni Ragnarsson	FSu
2007–08	Steinar Kaldal	Ármann
2007–08	Sævar Sigurmundsson	FSu
...
1998–99	Jón Örn Guðmundsson	Þór Þorlákshöfn
1998–99	Pálmi Freyr Sigurgeirsson	Breiðablik
1998–99	Pétur Ingvarsson	Hamar
1998–99	Óskar Þorðarson	Þór Þorlákshöfn
1998–99	Birgir Guðfinnsson	Selfoss
1997–98	Jón Örn Guðmundsson	Þór Þorlákshöfn
1997–98	Hrafn Kristjánsson	Hamar
1997–98	Atli Þorbjörnsson	ÍS
1997–98	Birgir Guðfinnsson	Leiknir
1997–98	Birgir Mikaelsson	Snæfell
1996–97	Ragnar Þór Jónsson	Valur
1996–97	Jón Örn Guðmundsson	Þór Þorlákshöfn
1996–97	Bjarki Gústafsson	Valur
1996–97	Birgir Guðfinnsson	Leiknir
1996–97	Gylfi Þorkelsson	Selfoss
