= 2017 Icelandic Cup =

Borgunarbikar

Tournament details
- Country: Iceland
- Teams: 78

Final positions
- Champions: ÍBV
- Runners-up: FH

Tournament statistics
- Matches played: 75
- Goals scored: 305 (4.07 per match)
- Top goal scorer(s): Karel Sigurðsson; Alfi Conteh-Lacalle (6 goals)
- All statistics correct as of 12 August 2017.

The 2017 Icelandic Cup, also known as Borgunarbikar for sponsorship reasons, was the 58th edition of the Icelandic national football cup. The winners were ÍBV after beating FH 1-0 in the final.

== Calendar ==
Below are the dates for each round as given by the official schedule:

Round	Main date	Number of fixtures	Clubs
First Round	17–24 April 2017	26	52 → 26
Second Round	27–30 April 2017	20	40 → 20
Round of 32	16–18 May 2017	16	32 → 16
Round of 16	30–31 May 2017	8	16 → 8
Quarter-finals	2–3 July 2017	4	8 → 4
Semi-finals	27–28 July 2017	2	4 → 2
Final	12 August 2017	1	2 → 1

== First round ==
Team 1	Score	Team 2
17 April 2017
Fjarðabyggð	1–0 (a.e.t.)	Einherji
21 April 2017
Kári	6–2	Léttir
Árborg	5–1	KB
KV	0–2	Þróttur V.
Elliði	3–6 (a.e.t.)	Kormákur/Hvöt
22 April 2017
GG	7–1	Snæfell/UDN
SR	1–3	ÍH
KFS	1–4	Hamar
KF	3–6	Tindastóll
Berserkir	3–1	Skallagrímur
Víðir	4–1	Mídas
Ægir	3–2 (a.e.t.)	Ýmir
Augnablik	6–0	Ísbjörninn
Álftanes	1–0	Vestri
Geisli A.	1–7	Nökkvi
23 April 2017
KH	1–0	Hvíti riddarinn
Reynir S.	7–1	Kórdrengir
Höttur	4–5	Sindri
Afturelding	0–1	Grótta
Vatnaliljur	2–1	Úlfarnir
Dalvík/Reynir	4–0	Drangey
Stokkseyri	1–0	Kría
Kóngarnir	1–3	Afríka
Gnúpverjar	1–2	KFR
KFG	4–1 (a.e.t.)	Vængir Júpiters
24 April 2017
Stál-úlfur	1–6	Njarðvík

17 April 2017	Fjarðabyggð	1–0 (a.e.t.)	Einherji	Fjarðabyggðarhöllin, Reyðarfjörður
12:00	Pétur Aron Atlason (yellow card) 38' (red card); Zoran Vujovic 94'	ksi.is	Víglundur Páll Einarsson (yellow card) 106' (red card)	Referee: Tómas Orri Hreinsson

21 April 2017	Kári	6–2	Léttir	Akraneshöllin, Akranes
19:00	Marinó Hilmar Ásgeirsson 23'; Andri Júlíusson 24', 47' (pen.), 88'; Arnar Freyr Sigurðsson 29'; Páll Sindri Einarsson 78'	ksi.is	Hafliði Hafliðason 10'; Rizon Gurung 84'	Attendance: 73; Referee: Egill Arnar Sigurþórsson

21 April 2017	Árborg	5–1	KB	JÁVERK-völlurinn, Selfoss
19:00	Arilíus Óskarsson 17', 54'; Aron Freyr Magnússon 36' (pen.); Hartmann Antonsson 45'; Magnús Helgi Sigurðsson 83'	ksi.is	Helgi Óttarr Hafsteinsson (yellow card) 73' (red card); Kristján Andri Einarsson (yellow card) 73' (red card); Sæmundur Bergmann Jóhannsson (red card) 76'; Kristján Hermann Þorkelsson 89'	Referee: Einar Ingi Jóhannsson

21 April 2017	KV	0–2	Þróttur V.	KR-völlur, Reykjavík
19:00		ksi.is	Elvar Freyr Arnþórsson 4'; Andri Björn Sigurðsson 72'	Referee: Jóhann Gunnar Guðmundsson

21 April 2017	Elliði	3–6 (a.e.t.)	Kormákur/Hvöt	Fylkisvöllur, Reykjavík
20:00	Styrmir Sigurjónsson 1'; Daníel Freyr Guðmundsson 4'; Benedikt Óli Breiðdal (yellow card) 103' (red card); Natan Hjaltalín 108' (pen.)		Ingvi Rafn Ingvarsson 81'; Sigurður Bjarni Aadnegard 90', 120'; Óskar Snær Vignisson 93', 112', 113'	Attendance: 50; Referee: Arnar Þór Stefánsson

22 April 2017	GG	7–1	Snæfell/UDN	Reykjaneshöllin, Reykjanesbær
10:00	Óli Baldur Bjarnason 16', 51', 65', 72', 73'; Nathan Ward 84'; Jón Unnar Viktorsson 86'	ksi.is	Deividas Leskys 53'	Attendance: 0 Referee: Kristinn Friðrik Hrafnsson

22 April 2017	SR	1–3	ÍH	Eimskipsvöllurinn, Reykjavík
13:15	Andri Jónsson 67'	ksi.is	Magnús Stefánsson 38', 44'; Anton Ingi Leifsson 84'	Referee: Arnar Ingi Ingvarsson

22 April 2017	KFS	1–4	Hamar	Helgafellsvöllur, Vestmannaeyjar
14:00	Gunnar Páll Hálfdánsson 71'	ksi.is	Hrannar Einarsson 28'; Magnús Otti Benediktsson 34'; Sam Malsom 53', 75'	Referee: Magnús Garðarsson

22 April 2017	KF	3–6	Tindastóll	KA-völlur, Akureyri
14:00	Grétar Áki Bergsson 2', 87'; Örn Elí Gunnlaugsson 25'	ksi.is	Ragnar Þór Gunnarsson 12', 53', 80'; Jakob Auðun Sindrason 30' (o.g.); Bjarni Smári Gíslason 36'; Óskar Smári Haraldsson 44'	Referee: Bjarni Hrannar Héðinsson

22 April 2017	Berserkir	3–1	Skallagrímur	Víkingsvöllur, Reykjavík
14:00	Karl Sigurðsson 25', 65'; Gunnar Jökull Johns 51'	ksi.is	Sigurður Sigurðsson 16'	Attendance: 28; Referee: Birkir Sigurðarson

22 April 2017	Víðir	4–1	Mídas	Framvöllur–Úlfarsárdal, Reykjavík
14:00	Aleksandar Stojkovic 37'; Óskar Örn Eyþórsson 44' (o.g.); Jörgen Már Ágústsson 49' (o.g.); Milan Tasic 86'	ksi.is	Sigurjón Björn Grétarsson 85'	Attendance: 30; Referee: Vilhjálmur Alvar Þórarinsson

22 April 2017	Ægir	3–2 (a.e.t.)	Ýmir	Þorlákshafnarvöllur, Þorlákshöfn
14:00	Jonathan Hood 42', 86'; Þorkell Þráinsson 103'	ksi.is	Oddur Hólm Haraldsson 63'; Daníel Arnar Magnússon 65'	Referee: Guðmundur Ársæll Guðmundsson

22 April 2017	Augnablik	6–0	Ísbjörninn	Fífan, Kópavogur
15:40	Guðjón Gunnarsson 37', 71', 90+2'; Arnór Brynjarsson 41'; Hjörvar Hermannsson 66'; Hermann Ármannsson 67'	ksi.is		Referee: Jóhann Ingi Jónsson

22 April 2017	Álftanes	1–0	Vestri	Bessastaðavöllur, Álftanes
16:00	Egill Már Hreinsson 1'	ksi.is		Referee: Sævar Sigurðsson

22 April 2017	Geisli A.	1–7	Nökkvi	KA-völlur, Akureyri
17:00	Aðalbjörn Hannesson 77' (o.g.)		Jón Heiðar Sigurðsson 20'; Bjarni Freyr Guðmundsson 25'; Þórður Sigmundur Sigmundsson 31' (pen.); Ingvar Már Gíslason 35'; Þórður Halldórsson 66'; Jón Viðar Halldórsson 69', 74'	Referee: Anton Mark Duffield

23 April 2017	KH	1–0	Hvíti riddarinn	Valsvöllur, Reykjavík
14:00	Sveinn Ingi Einarsson 89'	ksi.is		Referee: Bríet Bragadóttir

23 April 2017	Reynir S.	7–1	Kórdrengir	Sandgerðisvöllur, Sandgerði
14:00	Óðinn Jóhannsson 4'; Daníel Örn Baldvinsson 23'; Devonte Daryll Delroy Small 45', 60', 76'; Reynir Þór Valsson 57', 64'	ksi.is	Bergþór Frímann Sverrisson 54'	Referee: Aðalbjörn Heiðar Þorsteinsson

23 April 2017	Höttur	4–5	Sindri	Fellavöllur, Egilsstaðir
14:00	Nenad Zivanovic 39'; Brynjar Árnason 54' (pen.), 61'; Friðrik Ingi Þráinsson 71'	ksi.is	Gísli Björn Helgason 27' (o.g.); Mate Paponja 42', 51'; Mirza Hasecic 65'; Tómas Leó Ásgeirsson 89'	Referee: Tómas Orri Hreinsson

23 April 2017	Afturelding	0–1	Grótta	Varmárvöllur, Mosfellsbær
14:00		ksi.is	Ingólfur Sigurðsson 57'	Referee: Erlendur Eiríksson

23 April 2017	Vatnaliljur	2–1	Úlfarnir	Fagrilundur, Kópavogur
14:00	Andri Stefán Bjarnason 10'; Victor Páll Sigurðsson 68'	ksi.is	Andri Þór Sólbergsson 90+1'	Attendance: 21; Referee: Egill Arnar Sigurþórsson

23 April 2017	Dalvík/Reynir	4–0	Drangey	KA-völlur, Akureyri
14:00	Steinar Logi Þórðarson 34' (pen.); Kristján Freyr Óðinsson 39', 90'; Ingvar Gylfason (red card) 42'; Snorri Eldjárn Hauksson 90+4'	ksi.is	Arnar Ólafsson (yellow card) 90+3' (red card)	Attendance: 55; Referee: Sverrir Gunnar Pálmason

23 April 2017	Stokkseyri	1–0	Kría	JÁVERK-völlurinn, Selfoss
14:00	Þórhallur Aron Másson 62' (pen.)	ksi.is		Referee: Andri Vigfússon

23 April 2017	Kóngarnir	1–3	Afríka	Eimskipsvöllurinn, Reykjavík
14:00	Hjörtur Gunnarsson 11'; Stefán Þór Ingvarsson (yellow card) 69' (red card)	ksi.is	Mghar Idrissi Mustapa 8'; Ronald Audre Olaguin Gonzalez 37'; Amarildo Siveja 75'	Attendance: 23; Referee: Magnús Þór Jónsson

23 April 2017	Gnúpverjar	1–2	KFR	Fagrilundur, Kópavogur
14:00	Hlynur Magnússon 70'	ksi.is	Goran Jovanovski 86'; Jóhann Guðmundsson 90+1'	Referee: Gunnþór Steinar Jónsson

23 April 2017	KFG	4–1 (a.e.t.)	Vængir Júpiters	Samsung völlurinn, Garðabær
20:00	Bjarni Pálmason 59', 92', 97', 103'	ksi.is	Daníel Fernandes Ólafsson 45'	Referee: Helgi Mikael Jónasson

24 April 2017	Stál-úlfur	1–6	Njarðvík	Kórinn, Kópavogur
18:45	Ramunas Macezinskas 89'	ksi.is	Theodór Guðni Halldórsson 15', 29', 48'; Sigurður Þór Halldórsson 62', 90+2', 90+4'	Attendance: 35; Referee: Halldór Breiðfjörð Jóhannsson

== Second round ==
Team 1	Score	Team 2
27 April 2017
Nökkvi	1–5	Magni
28 April 2017
HK	0–1	Fram
Selfoss	8–0	Kormákur/Hvöt
29 April 2017
Keflavík	0–0 (a.e.t.) (4–5 p)	Víðir
Árborg	0–0 (a.e.t.) (4–3 p)	Hamar
Kári	3–0	Augnablik
Sindri	4–1 (a.e.t.)	Huginn
Álftanes	0–2	Ægir
Tindastóll	1–2	Þór
Fylkir	7–0	Vatnaliljur
GG	0–3	Þróttur V.
Njarðvík	0–2	ÍR
Berserkir	3–0	KFR
ÍH	0–1	KH
Afríka	0–11	Þróttur R.
Stokkseyri	0–5	Leiknir R.
30 April 2017
Fjarðabyggð	1–2	Leiknir F.
Dalvík/Reynir	0–2	Völsungur
Reynir S.	0–4	Haukar
KFG	0–3	Grótta

27 April 2017	Nökkvi	1–5	Magni	KA-völlur, Akureyri
20:00	Ingvar Már Gíslason 83'	ksi.is	Georg Fannar Haraldsson 36' (o.g.); Victor Da Costa 38', 62'; Bergvin Jóhannsson 81', 88'	Referee: Sverrir Gunnar Pálmason

28 April 2017	HK	0–1	Fram	Kórinn, Kópavogur
19:00		ksi.is	Sigurpáll Melberg Pálsson 38'	Attendance: 480; Referee: Þorvaldur Árnason

28 April 2017	Selfoss	8–0	Kormákur/Hvöt	JÁVERK-völlurinn, Selfoss
19:00	Elvar Ingi Vignisson 3'; Alfi Conteh-Lacalle 6', 33', 60', 73'; James Mack 8', 42'; Ivan Martinez Gutierrez 51'	ksi.is		Referee: Jóhann Ingi Jónsson

29 April 2017	Keflavík	0–0 (a.e.t.) (4–5 p)	Víðir	Reykjaneshöllin, Reykjanesbær
12:00		ksi.is		Attendance: 200; Referee: Elías Ingi Árnason

29 April 2017	Árborg	0–0 (a.e.t.) (4–3 p)	Hamar	JÁVERK-völlurinn, Selfoss
13:00	Daníel Ingi Birgisson (yellow card) 75' (red card)	ksi.is	Sigurður Andri Jóhannsson (red card) 105'; Hrannar Einarsson (red card) 120'	Attendance: 50; Referee: Arnar Þór Stefánsson

29 April 2017	Kári	3–0	Augnablik	Akraneshöllin, Akranes
14:00	Guðlaugur Þór Brandsson 85', 90+2'; Andri Júlíusson 87'	ksi.is	Hjörvar Hermannsson (yellow card) 67' (red card)	Referee: Viatcheslav Titov

29 April 2017	Sindri	4–1 (a.e.t.)	Huginn	Sindravellir, Höfn
14:00	Nedo Eres 55', 91', 100' (pen.); Seval Zahirovic 118'	ksi.is	Stefán Ómar Magnússon 1'; Stefan Spasic (red card) 89'	Attendance: 30; Referee: Tómas Orri Hreinsson

29 April 2017	Álftanes	0–2	Ægir	Bessastaðavöllur, Álftanes
14:00		ksi.is	Gunnar Bent Helgason 7'; Gunnar Orri Guðmundsson 90+6'	Referee: Arnar Ingi Ingvarsson

29 April 2017	Tindastóll	1–2	Þór	KA-völlur, Akureyri
14:00	Bjarni Smári Gíslason (red card) 40'; Hólmar Daði Skúlason 69'	ksi.is	Orri Freyr Hjaltalín 14'; Jóhann Helgi Hannesson 44'	Referee: Sigurður Hjörtur Þrastarson

29 April 2017	Fylkir	7–0	Vatnaliljur	Fylkisvöllur, Reykjavík
14:00	Andrés Már Jóhannesson 10'; Albert Brynjar Ingason 29'; Bjarki Steinar Björnsson 43' (o.g.); Oddur Ingi Guðmundsson 48', 71'; Elís Rafn Björnsson 65'; Valdimar Þór Ingimundarson 72'	ksi.is		Attendance: 68; Referee: Halldór Breiðfjörð Jóhannsson

29 April 2017	GG	0–3	Þróttur V.	Grindavíkurvöllur, Grindavík
15:00		ksi.is	Andri Björn Sigurðsson 26', 78'; Elvar Freyr Arnþórsson 34'	Attendance: 37; Referee: Magnús Þór Jónsson

29 April 2017	Njarðvík	0–2	ÍR	Reykjaneshöllin, Reykjanesbær
15:00		ksi.is	Andri Jónasson 9'; Jón Gísli Ström 36'	Referee: Einar Ingi Jóhannsson

29 April 2017	Berserkir	3–0	KFR	Víkingsvöllur, Reykjavík
16:00	Karel Sigurðsson 31', 71', 81'	ksi.is	Jóhann Gunnar Böðvarsson (red card) 25'	Referee: Kristinn Friðrik Hrafnsson

29 April 2017	ÍH	0–1	KH	Hertz völlurinn, Reykjavík
16:00		ksi.is	Alexander Lúðvígsson 5'	Attendance: 14; Referee: Helgi Ólafsson

29 April 2017	Afríka	0–11	Þróttur R.	Leiknisvöllur, Reykjavík
17:00		ksi.is	Vilhjálmur Kaldal Sigurðsson 12' (pen.); Sveinbjörn Jónasson 18', 20', 31', 53', 67'; Oddur Björnsson 35'; Brynjar Jónasson 58', 69', 79'; Víðir Þorvarðarson 87' (pen.)	Attendance: 40; Referee: Birkir Sigurðarson

29 April 2017	Stokkseyri	0–5	Leiknir R.	JÁVERK-völlurinn, Selfoss
17:00		ksi.is	Ragnar Leósson 3'; Kolbeinn Kárason 35', 59'; Daði Bærings Halldórsson 52'; Aron Daníelsson 79'	Attendance: 25; Referee: Gunnþór Steinar Jónsson

30 April 2017	Fjarðabyggð	1–2	Leiknir F.	Norðfjarðarvöllur, Neskaupstaður
14:00	Anton Bragi Jónsson 38'	ksi.is	Jesus Guerrero Suarez 37'; Dagur Ingi Valsson (yellow card) 59' (red card); Javier del Cueto 66'	Referee: Viatcheslav Titov

30 April 2017	Dalvík/Reynir	0–2	Völsungur	KA-völlur, Akureyri
14:00		ksi.is	Sæþór Olgeirsson 8'; Guðmundur Óli Steingrímsson 90+2'	Referee: Bjarni Hrannar Héðinsson

30 April 2017	Reynir S.	0–4	Haukar	Sandgerðisvöllur, Sandgerði
14:00		ksi.is	Björgvin Stefánsson 13'; Haukur Ásberg Hilmarsson 71'; Daníel Snorri Guðlaugsson 75'; Ísak Jónsson 88'	Referee: Bríet Bragadóttir

30 April 2017	KFG	0–2	Grótta	Samsung völlurinn, Garðabær
19:00		ksi.is	Alexander Kostic 19'; Ásgrímur Gunnarsson 72'; Agnar Guðjónsson 90+3'	Referee: Erlendur Eiríksson

== Round of 32 ==
The Round of 32 will be played 16–18 May 2017.

16 May 2017	Þór	0–0 (a.e.t.) (3–5 p)	Ægir	Þórsvöllur, Akureyri
18:00		ksi.is		Attendance: 198; Referee: Egill Arnar Sigurþórsson

16 May 2017	Selfoss	3–2	Kári	JÁVERK-völlurinn, Selfoss
19:15	Alfi Conteh-Lacalle 13'; James Mack 15'; Elvar Ingi Vignisson 88'	ksi.is	Andri Júlíusson 21'; Arnór Snær Guðmundsson 61'	Attendance: 150; Referee: Sigurður Óli Þórleifsson

16 May 2017	Leiknir R.	2–1	Þróttur R.	Leiknisvöllur, Reykjavík
19:15	Skúli E. Kristjánsson Sigurz 50'; Kolbeinn Kárason 86'	ksi.is	Halldór Kristinn Halldórsson 61' (o.g.)	Attendance: 272; Referee: Ívar Orri Kristjánsson

16 May 2017	Berserkir	1–4	Grótta	Víkingsvöllur, Reykjavík
20:00	Karel Sigurðsson 7'; Richard Már Guðbrandsson (red card) 90+1'	ksi.is	Viktor Smári Segatta 9', 75'; Jóhannes Hilmarsson 14'; Agnar Guðjónsson 26'	Attendance: 61; Referee: Guðmundur Ársæll Guðmundsson

17 May 2017	Leiknir F.	1–4	KR	Fjarðabyggðarhöllin, Reyðarfjörður
17:30	Jesus Guerrero Suarez 88'	ksi.is	Thomsen 17', 48'; Kennie Chopart 35', 77'	Referee: Elías Ingi Árnason

17 May 2017	KA	1–3 (a.e.t.)	ÍR	KA-völlur, Akureyri
18:00	Elfar Árni Aðalsteinsson 51'	ksi.is	Jón Gísli Ström 7'; Andri Jónasson 97'; Jón Arnar Barðdal 111'	Attendance: 241; Referee: Þóroddur Hjaltalín

17 May 2017	ÍBV	4–1	KH	Hásteinsvöllur, Vestmannaeyjar
18:20	Kaj Leo í Bartalsstovu 57'; Breki Ómarsson 73', 84'; Pablo Punyed 86'	ksi.is	Hreinn Þorvaldsson 90'	Referee: Aðalbjörn Heiðar Þorsteinsson

17 May 2017	ÍA	4–3	Fram	Norðurálsvöllurinn, Akranes
19:15	Garðar Gunnlaugsson 43' (pen.), 87', 90+3' (pen.); Hilmar Halldórsson (yellow card) 81' (red card); Ólafur Valur Valdimarsson 90+4'	ksi.is	Guðmundur Magnússon 8', 39'; Alex Freyr Elísson 45+1'; Kristófer Jacobson Reyes (yellow card) 90+3' (red card)	Attendance: 430; Referee: Gunnar Jarl Jónsson

17 May 2017	Þróttur V.	0–1	Stjarnan	Vogabæjarvöllur, Vogar
19:15		ksi.is	Máni Austmann Hilmarsson 10'	Referee: Helgi Mikael Jónasson

17 May 2017	Grindavík	7–1	Völsungur	Grindavíkurvöllur, Grindavík
19:15	Will Daniels 8', 19', 50', 86'; Sam Hewson 26', 53', 63'	ksi.is	Eyþór Traustason 45+1'	Referee: Halldór Breiðfjörð Jóhannsson

17 May 2017	Árborg	0–1	Víðir	JÁVERK-völlurinn, Selfoss
19:15		ksi.is	Helgi Þór Jónsson 90+1'	Attendance: 59; Referee: Pétur Guðmundsson

17 May 2017	Haukar	2–4	Víkingur R.	Gaman Ferða völlurinn, Hafnarfjörður
19:15	Elton Barros 6'; Gunnar Gunnarsson 68'	ksi.is	Alex Freyr Hilmarsson 14'; Vladimir Tufegdžić 18', 50' (pen.), 63'	Referee: Tómas Orri Hreinsson

17 May 2017	Fylkir	1–0	Breiðablik	Fylkisvöllur, Reykjavík
19:15	Daði Ólafsson 37' (pen.)	ksi.is		Referee: Vilhjálmur Alvar Þórarinsson

18 May 2017	Magni	1–2	Fjölnir	Grenivíkurvöllur, Grenivík
18:00	Ýmir Már Geirsson 18'	ksi.is	Igor Jugovic 7'; Þórir Guðjónsson 75' (pen.)	Referee: Sigurður Hjörtur Þrastarson

18 May 2017	FH	6–1	Sindri	Kaplakrikavöllur, Hafnarfjörður
18:00	Kassim Doumbia 25', 34'; Emil Pálsson 47', 67'; Atli Viðar Björnsson 62', 87'	ksi.is	Sævar Ingi Ásgeirsson 59'	Referee: Einar Ingi Jóhannsson

18 May 2017	Víkingur Ó.	0–1	Valur	Ólafsvíkurvöllur, Ólafsvík
19:15		ksi.is	Andri Adolphsson 44'	Attendance: 300; Referee: Þorvaldur Árnason

== Round of 16 ==
The Round of 16 will be played 30 May–1 June 2017.

30 May 2017	ÍA	2–1 (a.e.t.)	Grótta	Norðurálsvöllurinn, Akranes
19:15	Tryggvi Hrafn Haraldsson 83', 95'	ksi.is	Ingólfur Sigurðsson 63'; Halldór Kristján Baldursson (yellow card) 115' (red card)	Attendance: 437; Referee: Þorvaldur Árnason

31 May 2017	ÍBV	5–0	Fjölnir	Hásteinsvöllur, Vestmannaeyjar
17:30	Kaj Leo í Bartalsstovu 6'; Arnór Gauti Ragnarsson 35'; Mikkel Maigaard 41'; Pablo Punyed 63'; Sigurður Grétar Benónýsson 90+1'	ksi.is		Attendance: 303; Referee: Þóroddur Hjaltalín

31 May 2017	Víðir	0–5	Fylkir	Nesfisk-völlurinn, Garður
18:00		ksi.is	Oddur Ingi Guðmundsson 22', 55'; Arnar Már Björgvinsson 28'; Albert Brynjar Ingason 76'; Hákon Ingi Jónsson 77'	Attendance: 429; Referee: Ívar Orri Kristjánsson

31 May 2017	Ægir	1–3	Víkingur R.	Þorlákshafnarvöllur, Þorlákshöfn
19:15	Einar Ottó Antonsson 80'	ksi.is	Vladimir Tufegdžić 32' (pen.); Ivica Jovanović 35'; Alex Freyr Hilmarsson 43'	Attendance: 101; Referee: Aðalbjörn Heiðar Þorsteinsson

31 May 2017	ÍR	1–1 (a.e.t.) (6–7 p)	KR	Hertz völlurinn, Reykjavík
19:15	Jón Gísli Ström 64'	ksi.is	Thomsen 47'	Referee: Helgi Mikael Jónasson

31 May 2017	FH	2–1	Selfoss	Kaplakrikavöllur, Hafnarfjörður
19:15	Kristján Flóki Finnbogason 23', 32'	ksi.is	Alfi Conteh-Lacalle 35'	Referee: Vilhjálmur Alvar Þórarinsson

31 May 2017	Valur	1–2	Stjarnan	Valsvöllur, Reykjavík
20:00	Sigurður Egill Lárusson 45+3' (pen.)	ksi.is	Baldur Sigurðsson 34'; Jóhann Laxdal 69'	Attendance: 483; Referee: Gunnar Jarl Jónsson

1 June 2017	Leiknir R.	1–1 (a.e.t.) (5–4 p)	Grindavík	Leiknisvöllur, Reykjavík
19:15	Ósvald Jarl Traustason 68'	ksi.is	Will Daniels 32'	Attendance: 187; Referee: Pétur Guðmundsson

== Quarter-finals ==
The Quarter-finals were played from 29 June to 3 July 2017.

29 June 2017	Fylkir	0–1	FH	Floridana völlurinn, Reykjavík
19:15		ksi.is	Halldór Orri Björnsson 87'	Referee: Vilhjálmur Alvar Þórarinsson

2 July 2017	Víkingur R.	1–2	ÍBV	Víkingsvöllur, Reykjavík
17:00	Ivica Jovanović 24'	ksi.is	Alvaro Montejo Calleja 36'; Arnór Gauti Ragnarsson 86'	Attendance: 749; Referee: Erlendur Eiríksson

2 July 2017	Stjarnan	3–2	KR	Samsung völlurinn, Garðabær
19:15	Hilmar Árni Halldórsson 1', 39'; Guðjón Baldvinsson 90+4'	ksi.is	Óskar Örn Hauksson 20'; Thomsen 74'	Attendance: 1003; Referee: Þorvaldur Árnason

3 July 2017	Leiknir R.	2–1 (a.e.t.)	ÍA	Leiknisvöllur, Reykjavík
19:15	Arnór Snær Guðmundsson 24' (o.g.); Elvar Páll Sigurðsson 96'	ksi.is	Garðar Gunnlaugsson 63' (pen.)	Attendance: 462; Referee: Pétur Guðmundsson

== Semi-finals ==
The Semi-finals were played 27–29 July 2017.

27 July 2017	Stjarnan	1–2	ÍBV	Samsung völlurinn, Garðabær
19:15	Hilmar Árni Halldórsson 60'	ksi.is	Hafsteinn Briem 66'; Kaj Leo í Bartalsstovu 73'	Referee: Pétur Guðmundsson

29 July 2017	FH	1–0	Leiknir R.	Kaplakrikavöllur, Hafnarfjörður
14:00	Steven Lennon 90+3'	ksi.is		Referee: Þóroddur Hjaltalín

== Final ==
The final was played on 12 August 2017.

12 August 2017	ÍBV	1–0	FH	Laugardalsvöllur, Reykjavík
16:00	Gunnar Heiðar Þorvaldsson 37'	ksi.is		Attendance: 3,094; Referee: Vilhjálmur Alvar Þórarinsson

== Top goalscorers ==
As of matches played on 12 August 2017.

Rank	Player	Club	Goals
1	(Iceland) Karel Sigurðsson	Berserkir	6
1	(Sierra Leone) Alfi Conteh-Lacalle	Selfoss	6
3	(Iceland) Óli Baldur Bjarnason	GG	5
3	(Iceland) Sveinbjörn Jónasson	Þróttur R.	5
3	(Iceland) Andri Júlíusson	Kári	5
3	(United States) Will Daniels	Grindavík	5
7	(Iceland) Bjarni Pálmason	KFG	4
7	(Serbia) Vladimir Tufegdžić	Víkingur R.	4
7	(Iceland) Oddur Ingi Guðmundsson	Fylkir	4
7	(Denmark) Tobias Thomsen	KR	4
7	(Iceland) Garðar Gunnlaugsson	ÍA	4
