= 2018 1. deild karla =

1. deild karla
- Season: 2018
- Champions: ÍA
- Promoted: ÍA; HK
- Relegated: Selfoss; ÍR
- Matches played: 132
- Goals scored: 418 (3.17 per match)
- Top goalscorer: 22 goals Viktor Jónsson, Þróttur R.
- All statistics correct as of 29 September 2018.

The 2018 1. deild karla (English: Men's First Division) was the 64th season of the second-tier Icelandic football. Twelve teams competed in the league. The season began on 5 May and concluded on 22 September.

== Teams ==
The league is contested by twelve clubs. Eight remained in the division from the 2017 season, while four new clubs joined the 1. deild karla:

- Víkingur Ó. and ÍA were relegated from the 2017 Úrvalsdeild, replacing Fylkir and Keflavík who were promoted to the 2018 Úrvalsdeild.
- Njarðvík and Magni were promoted from the 2017 2. deild karla, in place of Leiknir F. and Grótta who were relegated to the 2018 2. deild karla.

=== Club information ===
Location of teams in the 2017 1. deild karla

Team	Manager	Location	Stadium	2017 season
Fram	(Iceland) Kristján Árnason	Reykjavík	Laugardalsvöllur	9th
Haukar	(Iceland) Kristján Ómar Björnsson	Hafnarfjörður	Ásvellir	7th
HK	(Iceland) Brynjar Björn Gunnarsson	Kópavogur	Kórinn	4th
ÍA	(Iceland) Jóhannes Karl Guðjónsson	Akranes	Norðurálsvöllurinn	Úrvalsdeild, 12th
ÍR	(Iceland) Brynjar Þór Gestsson	Reykjavík	Hertz-völlurinn	10th
Leiknir R.	(Iceland) Kristófer Sigurgeirsson	Reykjavík	Leiknisvöllur	5th
Magni	(Iceland) Páll Viðar Gíslason	Grenivík	Grenivíkurvöllur	2. deild, 2nd
Njarðvík	(Iceland) Rafn Markús Vilbergsson	Reykjanesbær	Njarðtaksvöllurinn	2. deild, 1st
Selfoss	(Iceland) Gunnar Rafn Borgþórsson	Selfoss	JÁVERK-völlurinn	8th
Víkingur Ó.	(Iceland) Sigurgeir Snorrason	Ólafsvík	Ólafsvíkurvöllur	Úrvalsdeild, 11th
Þór	(Iceland) Lárus Sigurðsson	Akureyri	Þórsvöllur	6th
Þróttur R.	(Iceland) Bjarni Örlygsson	Reykjavík	Eimskipsvöllurinn	3rd

=== Managerial changes ===
Team	Outgoing manager	Manner of departure	Date of vacancy	Position in table	Incoming manager	Date of appointment
Haukar	(Iceland) Stefán Gíslason	Resigned	23 September 2017	Pre-season	(Iceland) Kristján Ómar Björnsson	23 September 2017
ÍR	(Iceland) Arnar Þór Valsson	Resigned	4 October 2017	Pre-season	(Iceland) Brynjar Þór Gestsson	4 October 2017
ÍA	(Iceland) Jón Þór Hauksson	Resigned	11 October 2017	Pre-season	(Iceland) Jóhannes Karl Guðjónsson	12 October 2017
HK	(Iceland) Jóhannes Karl Guðjónsson	Resigned	12 October 2017	Pre-season	(Iceland) Brynjar Björn Gunnarsson	18 October 2017

== League table ==
Pos	Team	Pld	W	D	L	GF	GA	GD	Pts	Promotion or relegation
1	ÍA (C, P)	22	14	6	2	42	16	+26	48	Promotion to 2019 Úrvalsdeild
2	HK (P)	22	14	6	2	38	13	+25	48	Promotion to 2019 Úrvalsdeild
3	Þór	22	13	4	5	46	37	+9	43	
4	Víkingur Ó.	22	12	6	4	38	22	+16	42	
5	Þróttur R.	22	11	3	8	52	40	+12	36	
6	Njarðvík	22	7	6	9	24	34	−10	27	
7	Leiknir R.	22	7	4	11	23	29	−6	25	
8	Haukar	22	7	4	11	33	45	−12	25	
9	Fram	22	6	6	10	37	38	−1	24	
10	Magni	22	6	1	15	27	48	−21	19	
11	ÍR (R)	22	5	3	14	23	48	−25	18	Relegation to 2019 2. deild karla
12	Selfoss (R)	22	4	3	15	35	48	−13	15	Relegation to 2019 2. deild karla

Updated to match(es) played on 22 September 2018. Source: ksí.is
Rules for classification: 1) Points won; 2) Total goal difference; 3) Total goals scored; 4) Points in head-to-head matches; 5) Goal difference in h-t-h matches; 6) Goals scored in h-t-h matches; 7) Away goals in h-t-h matches; 8) Draw.
(C) Champions; (P) Promoted; (R) Relegated

== Results grid ==
Each team plays every opponent once home and away for a total of 22 matches per club, and 132 matches altogether.

Home \ Away	FRA	HAU	HKÓ	ÍA	ÍÞR	LER	MAG	NJA	SEL	VÓL	ÞÓR	ÞRÓ
Fram	—	3–1	1–4	0–1	1–2	3–0	3–1	0–0	2–2	1–2	3–3	2–2
Haukar	2–1	—	2–0	1–3	1–1	0–2	3–1	1–2	5–3	0–1	2–2	2–5
HK	1–0	3–0	—	0–0	3–0	2–1	3–0	1–0	3–1	1–1	4–1	0–1
ÍA	2–0	3–1	0–0	—	3–0	1–0	5–0	2–2	2–0	1–1	5–0	1–1
ÍR	2–3	0–4	1–1	0–2	—	1–0	2–3	1–2	3–2	0–2	0–1	1–3
Leiknir R.	2–2	0–0	0–2	0–0	3–1	—	3–1	2–3	1–1	1–2	0–1	2–1
Magni	2–1	2–1	0–1	2–3	0–1	0–1	—	2–0	3–1	1–0	1–2	1–4
Njarðvík	2–2	1–2	0–2	1–2	1–1	1–0	2–1	—	2–1	1–1	0–1	1–1
Selfoss	1–3	5–0	1–2	1–3	0–2	1–2	2–1	4–1	—	2–1	3–5	0–1
Víkingur Ó.	2–1	2–2	0–0	2–1	2–1	3–0	4–1	1–2	1–1	—	2–0	3–4
Þór	3–2	4–1	2–2	0–1	5–2	3–1	1–1	3–0	2–1	0–2	—	3–1
Þróttur R.	1–3	1–2	1–3	4–1	6–1	0–2	5–3	3–0	3–2	1–3	3–4	—

Updated to match(es) played on 22 September 2018. Source: ksí.is
Legend: Blue = home team win; Yellow = draw; Red = away team win.

== Top goalscorers ==
As of matches played on 22 september 2018

Rank	Player	Club	Goals
1	(Iceland) Viktor Jónsson	Þróttur R.	22
2	(Iceland) Guðmundur Magnússon	Fram	18
3	(Spain) Álvaro Calleja	Þór	16
4	(Sierra Leone) Kwame Quee	Víkingur Ó.	11
5	(Iceland) Brynjar Jónasson	HK	10
5	(Iceland) Sólon Breki Leifsson	Leiknir R.	10
5	(Spain) Gonzalo Zamorano	Víkingur Ó.	10
5	(Iceland) Stefán Teitur Þórðarson	ÍA	10
9	(Iceland) Arnar Aðalgeirsson	Haukar	9
9	(Iceland) Sævar Atli Magnússon	Leiknir R.	9
9	(Iceland) Gunnar Örvar Stefánsson	Magni	9
12	(Iceland) Daði Bergsson	Þróttur R.	7
12	(Iceland) Bjarni Gunnarsson	HK	7
12	(Croatia) Hrvoje Tokić	Selfoss	7
15	(Spain) Nacho Gil	Þór	6
