= 2017 Úrvalsdeild =

Úrvalsdeild karla (Pepsi-deildin)
- Season: 2017
- Dates: 30 April – 30 September 2017
- Champions: Valur
- Relegated: Víkingur Ó. ÍA
- Champions League: Valur
- Europa League: ÍBV; FH; Stjarnan
- Matches played: 132
- Goals scored: 403 (3.05 per match)
- Top goalscorer: Andri Rúnar Bjarnason (19 goals)
- Biggest home win: Valur 6–0 ÍA (31 July 2017)
- Biggest away win: Víkingur Ó. 0–3 ÍBV (21 May 2017); ÍBV 1–4 ÍA (27 May 2017); Víkingur Ó. 1–4 KA (6 June 2017); Víkingur R. 0–3 KR (23 July 2017); Víkingur Ó. 1–4 Breiðablik (20 August 2017)
- Highest scoring: KA 6–3 ÍBV (16 July 2017)
- All statistics correct as of 30 September 2017.

The 2017 Úrvalsdeild karla, also known as Pepsi-deild karla for sponsorship reasons, was the 106th season of top-flight Icelandic football. Twelve teams contested the league, including the defending champions FH, who won their eighth league title in 2016.

The season began on 30 April 2017 and concluded on 30 September 2017.

== Teams ==
Locations of the 2017 Úrvalsdeild teams

The 2017 Úrvalsdeild was contested by twelve teams, ten of which played in the division the previous year and two teams promoted from 1. deild karla. The bottom two teams from the previous season, Fylkir and Þróttur Reykjavík, were relegated to the 2017 1. deild karla and were replaced by KA and Grindavík, champions and runners-up of the 2016 1. deild karla respectively.

=== Club information ===
Team	Location	Stadium	Capacity
Breiðablik	Kópavogur	Kópavogsvöllur	5,501
FH	Hafnarfjörður	Kaplakriki	6,738
Fjölnir	Reykjavík	Extra völlurinn	2,000
Grindavík	Grindavík	Grindavíkurvöllur	1,750
ÍA	Akranes	Norðurálsvöllurinn	3,054
ÍBV	Vestmannaeyjar	Hásteinsvöllur	3,034
KA	Akureyri	Akureyrarvöllur	1,770
KR	Reykjavík	Alvogenvöllurinn	3,333
Stjarnan	Garðabær	Samsung völlurinn	2,300
Valur	Reykjavík	Valsvöllur	2,465
Víkingur Ó.	Ólafsvík	Ólafsvíkurvöllur	900
Víkingur R.	Reykjavík	Víkin	1,613

Source: Scoresway

=== Personnel and kits ===
Team	Manager	Captain	Kit manufacturer	Shirt sponsor
Breiðablik	(Serbia) Miloš Milojević	(Iceland) Gunnleifur Gunnleifsson	Jako	Vörður
FH	(Iceland) Heimir Guðjónsson	(Iceland) Davíð Þór Viðarsson	Adidas	Actavis
Fjölnir	(Iceland) Ágúst Gylfason	(Iceland) Þórður Ingason	Hummel	Bónus
Grindavík	(Iceland) Óli Stefán Flóventsson	(Iceland) Gunnar Þorsteinsson	Stanno	LYSI
ÍA	(Iceland) Jón Þór Hauksson	(Iceland) Arnar Már Guðjónsson	Errea	Norðurál
ÍBV	(Iceland) Kristján Guðmundsson	(Iceland) Sindri Snær Magnússon	Hummel	Bónus
KA	(Serbia) Srdjan Tufegdzic	(Iceland) Davíð Rúnar Bjarnason	Diadora	N1
KR	(Iceland) Willum Þór Þórsson	(Iceland) Pálmi Rafn Pálmason	Nike	Alvogen
Stjarnan	(Iceland) Rúnar Páll Sigmundsson	(Iceland) Baldur Sigurðsson	Uhlsport	Orkan
Valur	(Iceland) Ólafur Jóhannesson	(Iceland) Haukur Páll Sigurðsson	Macron	Íslandsbanki
Víkingur Ó.	(Bosnia and Herzegovina) Ejub Purisevic	(Iceland) Guðmundur Steinn Hafsteinsson	Jako	N1
Víkingur R.	(Iceland) Logi Ólafsson	(Iceland) Róbert Örn Óskarsson	Macron	TVG-Zimsen

=== Managerial changes ===
Team	Outgoing manager	Manner of departure	Date of vacancy	Position in table	Incoming manager	Date of appointment
Breiðablik	(Iceland) Arnar Grétarsson	Sacked	9 May 2017	10th	(Serbia) Miloš Milojević	22 May 2017
Víkingur R.	(Serbia) Miloš Milojević	Resigned	19 May 2017	10th	(Iceland) Logi Ólafsson	24 May 2017
ÍA	(Iceland) Gunnlaugur Jónsson	Resigned	21 August 2017	12th	(Iceland) Jón Þór Hauksson	21 August 2017

== League table ==
Pos	Team	Pld	W	D	L	GF	GA	GD	Pts	Qualification or relegation
1	Valur (C)	22	15	5	2	43	20	+23	50	Qualification for the Champions League first qualifying round
2	Stjarnan	22	10	8	4	46	25	+21	38	Qualification for the Europa League first qualifying round
3	FH	22	9	8	5	33	25	+8	35	Qualification for the Europa League first qualifying round
4	KR	22	8	7	7	31	29	+2	31	
5	Grindavík	22	9	4	9	31	39	−8	31	
6	Breiðablik	22	9	3	10	34	35	−1	30	
7	KA	22	7	8	7	37	31	+6	29	
8	Víkingur R.	22	7	6	9	32	36	−4	27	
9	ÍBV	22	7	4	11	32	38	−6	25	Qualification for the Europa League first qualifying round (Note: ÍBV qualified for the Europa League first qualifying round by winning the 2017 Icelandic Cup.)
10	Fjölnir	22	6	7	9	32	40	−8	25	
11	Víkingur Ó. (R)	22	6	4	12	24	44	−20	22	Relegation to 1. deild karla
12	ÍA (R)	22	3	8	11	28	41	−13	17	Relegation to 1. deild karla

Source: KSÍ (in Icelandic), Soccerway
Rules for classification: 1) Points; 2) Goal difference; 3) Goals scored; 4) Head-to-head points; 5) Head-to-head goal difference; 6) Head-to-head goals scored; 7) Head-to-head away goals scored; 8) Play-off (only for deciding champion); 9) Draw.
(C) Champions; (R) Relegated

== Results ==
Each team will play home and away once against every other team for a total of 22 games played each.

Home \ Away	BRE	FH	FJÖ	GRI	ÍA	ÍBV	KA	KR	STJ	VAL	VOL	VIR
Breiðablik	—	1–2	2–1	0–0	2–0	3–2	1–3	1–3	1–3	1–2	2–1	1–2
FH	0–1	—	1–2	1–0	2–0	2–1	2–2	0–1	3–0	2–1	0–2	2–2
Fjölnir	1–0	2–1	—	4–0	2–2	2–1	2–2	2–2	1–3	1–1	1–1	3–1
Grindavík	4–3	1–1	2–1	—	3–2	3–1	2–1	2–2	2–2	1–0	1–3	1–2
ÍA	2–3	2–4	3–1	2–3	—	0–1	2–0	1–1	2–2	2–4	0–0	1–1
ÍBV	1–1	0–1	0–0	2–1	1–4	—	3–0	3–1	2–2	2–3	0–1	1–0
KA	2–4	0–0	2–0	2–1	0–0	6–3	—	2–3	1–1	1–1	5–0	2–2
KR	1–1	2–2	2–0	0–1	2–1	0–3	0–0	—	0–1	0–0	4–2	1–2
Stjarnan	2–0	1–1	4–0	5–0	2–2	5–0	2–1	2–0	—	1–2	3–0	1–2
Valur	1–0	1–1	4–1	2–0	6–0	2–1	1–0	2–1	1–1	—	2–0	4–3
Víkingur Ó.	0–3	1–1	4–4	2–1	1–0	0–3	1–4	1–2	2–1	1–2	—	1–3
Víkingur R.	2–3	2–4	2–1	1–2	0–0	1–1	0–1	0–3	2–2	0–1	2–0	—

Source: KSÍ (Football Association of Iceland) (in Icelandic)
Legend: Blue = home team win; Yellow = draw; Red = away team win.

== Top goalscorers ==
As of matches played on 30 September 2017.

Rank	Player	Club	Goals
1	(Iceland) Andri Rúnar Bjarnason	Grindavík	19
2	(Scotland) Steven Lennon	FH	15
3	(Iceland) Guðjón Baldvinsson	Stjarnan	12
4	(Netherlands) Geoffrey Castillion	Víkingur R.	11
4	(Iceland) Hólmbert Friðjónsson	Stjarnan	11
6	(Iceland) Gunnar Heiðar Þorvaldsson	ÍBV	10
6	(Iceland) Hilmar Árni Halldórsson	Stjarnan	10
8	(Denmark) Emil Lyng	KA	9
8	(Denmark) Tobias Thomsen	KR	9
8	(Iceland) Elfar Árni Aðalsteinsson	KA	9
