= Jason Daði Svanþórsson =

Icelandic footballer (born 1999)

Personal information
- Full name: Jason Daði Svanþórsson
- Date of birth: 31 December 1999 (age 26)
- Place of birth: Mosfellsbær, Iceland
- Height: 1.78 m (5 ft 10 in)
- Position: Attacking midfielder

Team information
- Current team: KR Reykjavik
- Number: 14

Youth career
- –2017: Afturelding

Senior career*
Years	Team	Apps	(Gls)
2017–2020	Afturelding	64	(18)
2021–2024	Breiðablik	82	(26)
2024–2026	Grimsby Town	50	(4)
2026–	KR Reykjavik	3	(0)

International career^{‡}
2022–	Iceland	5	(0)
- * Club domestic league appearances and goals as of 1 November 2026 ‡ National team caps and goals as of 11 March 2024

Jason Daði Svanþórsson (transliterated as Jason Dadi Svanthórsson; born 31 December 1999) is an Icelandic footballer who plays as an attacking midfielder for Besta deild karla club KR Reykjavik and the Iceland national team.

== Club career ==
=== Afturelding ===
Jason grew up at Afturelding and started his senior career there.

=== Breiðablik ===
He joined Breiðablik after the 2020 season.

=== Grimsby Town ===
On 9 July 2024, he joined English League Two club Grimsby Town on a two-year deal for an undisclosed fee. He made his debut for Grimsby on 13 July 2024 in a friendly match against Cleethropes Town. He was assigned squad number 11 for the 2024–2025 season.

He made his competitive debut for the club in the 1–0 away defeat to Fleetwood Town on the first day of the season however suffered an injury 30 minutes into the match and was substituted off. His first league goal came in the 2–1 victory at home over Bradford City on 31 August 2024. He followed this up with a second goal in succession, scoring in a 3–0 victory over Port Vale in the last match before the turn of the year. Injuries caused him to miss most of his second season at the club, before he was released at the conclusion of the 2025–26 season.

=== KR Reykjavik ===
On 28 June 2026, Svanþórsson returned to Iceland, signing an 18-month contract with Besta deild karla club KR Reykjavik.

== International career ==
Jason made his international debut for Iceland on 9 June 2022 in a friendly match against San Marino.

== Career statistics ==
=== Club ===
As of match played 2 May 2026

Appearances and goals by club, season and competition
Clubs	Season	League			National Cup		League Cup		UECL		UEL		UCL		Other		Total	
Clubs	Season	League	Apps	Goals	Apps	Goals	Apps	Goals	Apps	Goals	Apps	Goals	Apps	Goals	Apps	Goals	Apps	Goals
Afturelding	2016	2. deild	0	0	0	0	2	0	-	-	-	-	-	-	-	-	2	0
Afturelding	2017	2. deild	4	2	0	0	2	0	-	-	-	-	-	-	-	-	6	2
Afturelding	2018	2. deild	19	3	3	2	6	1	-	-	-	-	-	-	-	-	28	6
Afturelding	2019	1. deild	22	5	2	0	5	3	-	-	-	-	-	-	-	-	29	8
Afturelding	2020	1. deild	19	8	3	5	5	2	-	-	-	-	-	-	-	-	27	15
Afturelding	Total		64	18	8	7	20	6	-	-	-	-	-	-	-	-	92	31
Breiðablik	2021	Besta deild	20	6	0	0	6	2	4	1	-	-	-	-	-	-	30	9
Breiðablik	2022	Besta deild	27	11	3	0	2	3	5	0	-	-	-	-	1 (Note: Appearances in the Icelandic Men's Super Cup)	0	38	14
Breiðablik	2023	Besta deild	22	4	3	0	3	0	8	2	2	0	6	3	0	0	44	9
Breiðablik	2024	Besta deild	13	5	1	0	3	1	0	0	-	-	-	-	-	-	17	6
Breiðablik	Total		82	26	7	0	14	6	17	3	2	0	6	3	1	0	129	38
Grimsby Town	2024–25	League Two	43	4	1	0	1	0	-	-	-	-	-	-	2 (Note: Appearances in the EFL Trophy)	1	47	5
Grimsby Town	2025–26	League Two	7	0	1	0	1	0	-	-	-	-	-	-	0	0	9	0
Grimsby Town	Total		50	4	2	0	2	0	-	-	-	-	-	-	2	1	56	5
Career total			196	48	17	7	36	12	17	3	2	0	6	3	3	1	277	74

=== International ===
As of match played 10 June 2024

Team	Year	Competitive			Non-Competitive			Total		
Team	Year	Apps	Goals	Assists	Apps	Goals	Assists	Apps	Goals	Assists
Iceland	2022	0	0	0	3	0	0	3	0	0
Iceland	2023	0	0	0	0	0	0	0	0	0
Iceland	2024	0	0	0	2	0	2	2	0	2
Total		0	0	0	5	0	2	5	0	2
