= Kaj Leo í Bartalsstovu =

Faroese footballer (born 1991)

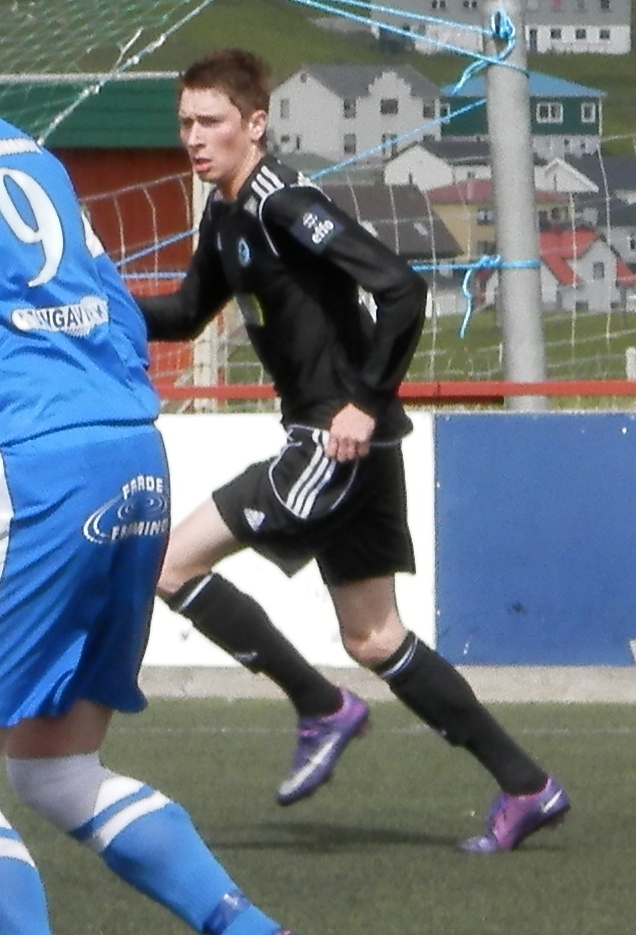
- Kaj Leo í Bartalsstovu in 2012

Personal information
- Date of birth: 23 June 1991 (age 35)
- Place of birth: Vágur, Faroe Islands
- Height: 1.83 m (6 ft 0 in)
- Position: Winger

Team information
- Current team: Víkingur Gøta
- Number: 77

Senior career*
| Years | Team | Apps | (Gls) |
| 2010–2014 | Víkingur Gøta | 102 | (23) |
| 2014–2016 | Levanger | 42 | (8) |
| 2016 | Dinamo București | 6 | (0) |
| 2016 | FH | 7 | (0) |
| 2017–2018 | ÍBV | 41 | (4) |
| 2019–2021 | Valur | 48 | (5) |
| 2022 | ÌA | 24 | (2) |
| 2023 | Leiknir | 9 | (0) |
| 2023–2025 | Njarðvík | 27 | (5) |
| 2026– | Víkingur Gøta | 15 | (0) |

International career^{‡}
| | Faroe Islands U21 | 6 | (0) |
| 2013– | Faroe Islands | 28 | (1) |
- * Club domestic league appearances and goals as of 1 November 2026 ‡ National team caps and goals as of 23 January 2023

Kaj Leo í Bartalsstovu (born 23 June 1991) is a Faroese professional footballer who plays for Víkingur Gøta. (Note: Kaj Leo í Bartalsstovu at WorldFootball.net) He has also been capped at senior and junior level for his country.

== Club career ==
Bartalsstovu started his career at Víkingur Gøta where he played 102 times, scoring 23 goals in the process. He signed for Norwegian club Levanger on 21 January 2014.

On 1 February 2016, Bartalsstovu signed a one-and-a-half-year contract for Romanian team Dinamo București, becoming the first Faroese footballer contracted to a Romanian Liga I club.

On 14 February 2016, Bartalsstovu made his first team debut for Dinamo București in a 1–0 win against FC Botosani, on 20 May Kaj Leo was released from his contract with Dinamo Bucuresti, after the previous manager stepped down, he later signed for FH.

On 8 November 2016, Bartalsstovu signed a two-year contract for ÍBV. After a short stint with ÍBV which included an Icelandic Men's Football Cup win, Bartalsstovu signed for Reykjavík outfit Valur in 2019. The following season was curtailed due to COVID-19 restrictions. Valur were top of the league with four games remaining and were crowned champions. He was later released from his contract with the club. After rumoured interest from clubs in Scandinavia and trials with various Icelandic clubs, Bartalsstovu signed a two-year contract with current club ÌA. The deal was confirmed by the club on 15 February 2022.

== International career ==
Bartalsstovu has represented the Faroe Islands at international level, making his first start against Hungary in the UEFA 2016 Qualifiers on 8 October 2015.

=== International goals ===
Scores and results list Faroe Islands' goal tally first.

| # | Date | Venue | Opponent | Score | Result | Competition |
|---|---|---|---|---|---|---|
| 1. | 25 March 2018 | Estadio Municipal de Marbella, Marbella, Spain | Liechtenstein | 1–0 | 3–0 | Friendly |

== Career statistics ==
=== Career ===
As of 6 March 2024

Appearances and goals by club, season and competition
| Club | Season | League | | | National cup (Note: Includes Faroe Islands Cup, Norwegian Football Cup, Cupa României, Icelandic Men's Football Cup) | | Continental | | Other | | Total | |
| Club | Season | Division | Apps | Goals | Apps | Goals | Apps | Goals | Apps | Goals | Apps | Goals |
|---|---|---|---|---|---|---|---|---|---|---|---|---|
| Víkingur Gøta | 2010 | Faroe Islands Premier League | 27 | 0 | 3 | 0 | 2 (Note: Appearances in UEFA Europa League) | 0 | — | | 32 | 0 |
| Víkingur Gøta | 2011 | Faroe Islands Premier League | 26 | 7 | 2 | 1 | — | | — | | 28 | 8 |
| Víkingur Gøta | 2012 | Faroe Islands Premier League | 24 | 11 | 4 | 1 | 2 | 0 | — | | 30 | 12 |
| Víkingur Gøta | 2013 | Faroe Islands Premier League | 25 | 5 | 5 | 1 | 4 | 0 | 1 (Note: Appearance in Faroe Islands Super Cup) | 0 | 35 | 6 |
| Víkingur Gøta | Total | | 102 | 23 | 14 | 3 | 8 | 0 | 1 | 0 | 125 | 26 |
| Levanger | 2014 | 2. divisjon | 24 | 6 | 2 | 1 | — | | — | | 26 | 7 |
| Levanger | 2015 | 1. divisjon | 18 | 2 | 0 | 0 | — | | — | | 18 | 2 |
| Levanger | Total | | 42 | 8 | 0 | 0 | — | | — | | 42 | 9 |
| Dinamo București | 2015-16 | Liga I | 6 | 0 | 1 | 0 | — | | 1 (Note: Appearance in Cupa Ligii) | 0 | 8 | 0 |
| FH | 2016 | Úrvalsdeild | 7 | 0 | — | | — | | — | | 7 | 0 |
| ÍBV | 2017 | Úrvalsdeild | 19 | 2 | 5 | 3 | — | | — | | 24 | 5 |
| ÍBV | 2018 | Úrvalsdeild | 22 | 2 | 2 | 1 | 2 | 0 | 1 (Note: Appearance in Icelandic Men's Football Super Cup) | 1 | 27 | 4 |
| ÍBV | Total | | 41 | 4 | 7 | 4 | 2 | 0 | 1 | 1 | 51 | 9 |
| Valur | 2019 | Úrvalsdeild | 16 | 0 | 1 | 0 | 4 (Note: Two appearances in UEFA Champions League, Two appearances in UEFA Europa League) | 0 | 1 | 0 | 22 | 0 |
| Valur | 2020 | Úrvalsdeild | 17 | 2 | 2 | 1 | — | | — | | 19 | 3 |
| Valur | 201 | Úrvalsdeild | 15 | 3 | 3 | 1 | 1 | 0 | — | | 19 | 4 |
| Valur | Total | | 48 | 5 | 6 | 2 | 5 | 0 | 1 | 0 | 60 | 7 |
| ÍA | 2022 | Besta deild karla | 24 | 3 | 2 | 3 | — | | — | | 26 | 6 |
| Leiknir | 2023 | 1. deild karla | 9 | 0 | 2 | 0 | — | | — | | 11 | 0 |
| Njarðvík | 2023 | 1. deild karla | 9 | 0 | — | | — | | — | | 9 | 0 |
| Career Total | | | 288 | 43 | 32 | 12 | 15 | 0 | 4 | 1 | 339 | 57 |

== Honours ==
Víkingur Gøta

- Faroe Islands Cup: 2012, 2013

FH

- Icelandic Championship: 2016

ÍBV

- Icelandic Cup: 2017
