= 2017 1. deild karla =

1. deild karla
- Season: 2017
- Champions: Fylkir
- Promoted: Fylkir; Keflavík
- Relegated: Leiknir F. Grótta
- Matches: 132
- Goals: 398 (3.02 per match)
- Top goalscorer: Jeppe Hansen (15 goals)
- Biggest home win: Leiknir F. 6–0 Haukar (9 September 2017)
- Biggest away win: Haukar 0–6 Fylkir (25 August 2017)
- Highest scoring: Haukar 5–3 Leiknir R. (31 August 2017)
- All statistics correct as of 23 September 2017.

The 2017 1. deild karla (English: Men's First Division) was the 63rd season of second-tier Icelandic football. Twelve teams contested in the league. The season began on 5 May and concluded on 23 September.

== Teams ==
The league was contested by twelve clubs. Eight remained in the division from the 2016 season, while four new clubs joined the 1. deild karla:

- Fylkir and Þróttur R. were relegated from the 2016 Úrvalsdeild, replacing KA and Grindavík who were promoted to the 2017 Úrvalsdeild.
- ÍR and Grótta were promoted from the 2016 2. deild karla, in place of Huginn and Fjarðabyggð who were relegated to the 2017 2. deild karla.

=== Club information ===
Location of teams in the 2017 1. deild karla

Team	Manager	Location	Stadium	2016 season
Fram	(Portugal) Pedro Hipólito	Reykjavík	Laugardalsvöllur	6th
Fylkir	(Iceland) Helgi Sigurðsson	Reykjavík	Floridana völlurinn	Úrvalsdeild, 11th
Grótta	(Iceland) Þórhallur Dan Jóhannesson	Seltjarnarnes	Vivaldivöllurinn	2. deild, 2nd
Haukar	(Iceland) Stefán Gíslason	Hafnarfjörður	Ásvellir	5th
HK	(Iceland) Joey Guðjónsson	Kópavogur	Kórinn	9th
ÍR	(Iceland) Arnar Þór Valsson	Reykjavík	Hertz-völlurinn	2. deild, 1st
Keflavík	(Iceland) Guðlaugur Baldursson	Keflavík	Nettóvöllurinn	3rd
Leiknir F.	(Iceland) Viðar Jónsson	Reyðarfjörður	Fjarðabyggðarhöllin	10th
Leiknir R.	(Iceland) Kristófer Sigurgeirsson	Reykjavík	Leiknisvöllur	7th
Selfoss	(Iceland) Gunnar Rafn Borgþórsson	Selfoss	JÁVERK-völlurinn	8th
Þór	(Iceland) Lárus Sigurðsson	Akureyri	Þórsvöllur	4th
Þróttur R.	(England) Gregg Ryder	Reykjavík	Eimskipsvöllurinn	Úrvalsdeild, 12th

=== Managerial changes ===
Team	Outgoing manager	Manner of departure	Date of vacancy	Position in table	Incoming manager	Date of appointment
Fram	(Iceland) Ásmundur Arnarsson	Sacked	19 June 2017	5th	(Portugal) Pedro Hipólito	3 July 2017

== League table ==
Pos	Team	Pld	W	D	L	GF	GA	GD	Pts	Promotion or relegation
1	Fylkir (C, P)	22	15	3	4	50	19	+31	48	Promotion to 2018 Úrvalsdeild
2	Keflavík (P)	22	14	4	4	43	24	+19	46	Promotion to 2018 Úrvalsdeild
3	Þróttur R.	22	13	3	6	37	21	+16	42	
4	HK	22	14	0	8	36	28	+8	42	
5	Leiknir R.	22	10	6	6	38	31	+7	36	
6	Þór	22	10	4	8	35	31	+4	34	
7	Haukar	22	9	6	7	34	39	−5	33	
8	Selfoss	22	8	4	10	27	29	−2	28	
9	Fram	22	7	6	9	32	39	−7	27	
10	ÍR	22	5	4	13	27	38	−11	19	
11	Leiknir F. (R)	22	3	1	18	23	53	−30	10	Relegation to 2018 2. deild karla
12	Grótta (R)	22	2	3	17	16	46	−30	9	Relegation to 2018 2. deild karla

Updated to match(es) played on 23 September 2017. Source: ksí.is
Rules for classification: 1) Points won; 2) Total goal difference; 3) Total goals scored; 4) Points in head-to-head matches; 5) Goal difference in h-t-h matches; 6) Goals scored in h-t-h matches; 7) Away goals in h-t-h matches; 8) Draw.
(C) Champions; (P) Promoted; (R) Relegated

== Results grid ==
Each team plays every opponent once home and away for a total of 22 matches per club, and 132 matches altogether.

Home \ Away	FRA	FYL	GRÓ	HAU	HKÓ	KEF	LEF	LER	SEL	ÍÞR	ÞÓR	ÞRÓ
Fram	—	1–5	1–0	2–2	2–3	0–1	3–2	3–0	0–0	2–1	1–3	0–4
Fylkir	2–0	—	4–0	2–0	0–1	1–1	4–1	2–0	2–0	2–1	3–1	3–1
Grótta	1–3	1–2	—	1–1	1–4	0–1	3–0	1–3	0–2	1–2	1–3	0–3
Haukar	3–2	0–6	1–1	—	2–1	4–2	5–0	5–3	2–1	1–1	2–0	0–0
HK	1–2	0–3	2–0	2–0	—	2–1	1–0	3–2	2–1	2–0	2–0	0–1
Keflavík	1–0	3–3	3–0	3–0	3–1	—	3–0	1–2	2–2	3–2	1–0	1–0
Leiknir F.	1–2	3–1	2–2	6–0	1–3	2–4	—	1–3	0–2	0–2	0–3	3–2
Leiknir R.	2–2	1–0	2–1	0–0	1–2	1–1	2–0	—	2–0	4–0	0–2	1–0
Selfoss	1–1	1–2	0–1	2–1	1–0	1–2	2–0	0–2	—	1–0	2–3	1–1
ÍR	2–2	1–2	3–1	1–2	2–3	1–3	2–0	1–1	1–3	—	2–1	1–2
Þór	2–2	1–1	2–0	2–1	3–0	0–3	2–1	3–3	1–4	0–0	—	2–0
Þróttur R.	2–1	1–0	2–0	1–2	2–1	2–0	2–0	3–3	4–0	2–1	2–1	—

Updated to match(es) played on 23 September 2017. Source: ksí.is
Legend: Blue = home team win; Yellow = draw; Red = away team win.

== Top goalscorers ==
As of matches played on 23 September 2017

Rank	Player	Club	Goals
1	(Denmark) Jeppe Hansen	Keflavík	15
2	(Iceland) Björgvin Stefánsson	Haukar	14
2	(Iceland) Albert Brynjar Ingason	Fylkir	14
4	(Iceland) Viktor Jónsson	Þróttur R.	13
5	(Croatia) Ivan Bubalo	Fram	10
5	(Iceland) Bjarni Gunnarsson	HK	10
7	(Iceland) Tómas Óli Garðarsson	Leiknir R.	8
8	(Iceland) Brynjar Jónasson	HK	7
8	(Iceland) Tómas Óli Garðarsson	Leiknir R.	7
8	(Iceland) Guðmundur Magnússon	Fram	7
8	(United States) J. C. Mack	Selfoss	7
