= Bjarki Steinn Bjarkason =

Icelandic footballer

Bjarki Bjarkason
Personal information
- Full name: Bjarki Steinn Bjarkason
- Date of birth: 11 May 2000 (age 26)
- Place of birth: Reykjavík, Iceland
- Height: 1.80 m (5 ft 11 in)
- Position: Winger

Team information
- Current team: Südtirol
- Number: 20

Youth career
- 2005–2017: Afturelding

Senior career*
Years	Team	Apps	(Gls)
2017	Afturelding	10	(2)
2018–2020	ÍA	41	(5)
2020–2026	Venezia	66	(4)
2022	→ Catanzaro (loan)	11	(0)
2023	→ Foggia (loan)	12	(2)
2026–	Südtirol	1	(0)

International career^{‡}
2016	Iceland U17	3	(0)
2017	Iceland U18	2	(0)
2018	Iceland U19	3	(0)
2019–2022	Iceland U21	14	(0)
2022–	Iceland	7	(0)
- * Club domestic league appearances and goals as of 22 August 2026 ‡ National team caps and goals as of 9 September 2025

Bjarki Steinn Bjarkason (born 11 May 2000) is an Icelandic professional footballer who plays as a winger for Serie B club Südtirol and the Iceland national team.

== Club career ==
Bjarki made his debut for Afturelding in a 3–1 win against Völsungur on 15 July 2017. On 6 December 2017, he joined ÍA and played there for three years. On 21 August 2020, he joined Venezia.

On 14 January 2022, he joined Serie C club Catanzaro on loan until the end of the season.

Upon his return from loan, Bjarki did not make any league appearances for Venezia in the first half of the 2022–23 season, playing in one Coppa Italia game. On 20 January 2023, he was loaned to Serie C club Foggia.

== Personal life ==
His father is former international handballer, Bjarki Sigurðsson.

== Career statistics ==
=== Club ===
As of match played 8 March 2025

Appearances and goals by club, season and competition
Club	Season	League			National cup (Note: Includes Icelandic Cup, Coppa Italia, Coppa Italia Serie C)		League cup (Note: Includes Icelandic League Cup)		Europe		Other		Total	
Club	Season	Division	Apps	Goals	Apps	Goals	Apps	Goals	Apps	Goals	Apps	Goals	Apps	Goals
Afturelding	2016	2. deild	0	0	0	0	1	0	—		—		1	0
Afturelding	2017	2. deild	10	2	0	0	4	1	—		—		14	3
Afturelding	Total		10	2	0	0	5	1	—		—		15	3
ÍA	2018	1. deild	16	1	4	0	4	1	—		—		24	2
ÍA	2019	Úrvalsdeild	20	3	1	0	7	3	—		—		28	6
ÍA	2020	Úrvalsdeild	5	1	1	0	4	1	—		—		10	2
ÍA	Total		41	5	6	0	15	5	—		—		62	10
Venezia	2020–21	Serie B	9	0	2	0	—		—		1 (Note: Appearance(s) in Serie B play-off)	0	12	0
Venezia	2021–22	Serie A	1	0	1	0	—		—		—		2	0
Venezia	2022–23	Serie B	0	0	1	0	—		—		—		1	0
Venezia	2023–24	Serie B	32	3	1	0	—		—		3	0	36	3
Venezia	2024–25	Serie A	9	0	0	0	—		—		—		9	0
Venezia	Total		51	3	5	0	—		—		4	0	60	3
Catanzaro (loan)	2021–22	Serie C	11	0	1	0	—		—		0	0	12	0
Foggia (loan)	2022–23	Serie C	12	2	1	0	—		—		9 (Note: Appearance(s) in Serie C play-off)	3	22	5
Career total			125	12	13	0	20	6	—		13	3	171	21

=== International ===
As of match played 9 September 2025

Appearances and goals by national team and year
National team	Year	Apps	Goals
Iceland	2022	2	0
Iceland	2023	0	0
Iceland	2024	2	0
Iceland	2025	3	0
Total		7	0

== Honours ==
Íþróttabandalag Akraness

- 1. deild karla: 2018
- Icelandic League Cup runner-up: 2019
