= 2018 3. deild karla =

3. deild karla
- Season: 2018
- Champions: Dalvík/Reynir
- Promoted: Dalvík/Reynir; KFG
- Relegated: Ægir; Sindri
- Matches played: 90
- Goals scored: 322 (3.58 per match)
- Top goalscorer: 15 goals Jóhann Ólafur Jóhannsson, KFG
- Biggest home win: KFG 6–0 Augnablik (18 June 2018); Vængir Júpiters 7-1 Sindri (15 September 2018)
- Biggest away win: Sindri 1-7 Vængir Júpiters (7 July 2018)
- All statistics correct as of 29 September 2018.

The 2018 3. deild karla (English: Men's Third Division) was the 6th season of fourth-tier Icelandic football in its ten team league format. The league began on 11 May and concluded on 15 September.

== Teams ==
The league was contested by ten clubs. Six remained in the division from the 2017 season, while four new clubs joined the 3. deild karla:

- Sindri and KV were relegated from the 2017 2. deild karla, replacing Kári and Þróttur Vogum who were promoted to the 2018 2. deild karla
- Augnablik and KH were promoted from the 2017 4. deild karla, in place of Reynir Sandgerði and Berserkir who were relegated to the 2018 4. deild karla

== 2018 Member Clubs ==
| Team | Location | Stadium | 2017 season |
|---|---|---|---|
| Augnablik | Kópavogur | Fagrilundur | 4. deild karla, 2nd |
| Dalvík/Reynir | Dalvík | Dalvíkurvöllur | 8th |
| Einherji | Vopnafjörður | Vopnafjarðarvöllur | 6th |
| KH | Reykjavík (Hlíðar) | Valsvöllur | 4. deild karla, 1st |
| KF | Fjallabyggð | Ólafsfjarðarvöllur | 5th |
| KFG | Garðabær | Samsung völlurinn | 3rd |
| KV | Reykjavík (Vesturbær) | KR-völlur | 2. deild karla, 11th |
| Sindri | Höfn | Sindravellir | 2. deild karla, 12th |
| Vængir Júpiters | Reykjavík (Grafarvogur) | Fjölnisvöllur | 4th |
| Ægir | Þorlákshöfn | Þorlákshafnarvöllur | 7th |

== League table ==
| Pos | Team | Pld | W | D | L | GF | GA | GD | Pts | Qualification or relegation |
|---|---|---|---|---|---|---|---|---|---|---|
| 1 | Dalvík/Reynir (C, P) | 18 | 9 | 5 | 4 | 27 | 16 | +11 | 32 | Promotion to 2019 2 deild karla |
| 2 | KFG (P) | 18 | 10 | 2 | 6 | 43 | 34 | +9 | 32 | Promotion to 2019 2 deild karla |
| 3 | KF | 18 | 10 | 1 | 7 | 29 | 23 | +6 | 31 | |
| 4 | Vængir Júpiters | 18 | 9 | 3 | 6 | 34 | 25 | +9 | 30 | |
| 5 | KH | 18 | 8 | 4 | 6 | 33 | 24 | +9 | 28 | |
| 6 | Einherji | 18 | 9 | 1 | 8 | 33 | 32 | +1 | 28 | |
| 7 | KV | 18 | 6 | 5 | 7 | 31 | 29 | +2 | 23 | |
| 8 | Augnablik | 18 | 6 | 3 | 9 | 27 | 45 | −18 | 21 | |
| 9 | Sindri (R) | 18 | 6 | 1 | 11 | 27 | 42 | −15 | 19 | Relegation to 2019 4. deild karla |
| 10 | Ægir (R) | 18 | 3 | 3 | 12 | 20 | 34 | −14 | 12 | Relegation to 2019 4. deild karla |

Updated to match(es) played on 29 September 2018. Source: ksí.is
Rules for classification: 1) Points won; 2) Total goal difference; 3) Total goals scored; 4) Points in head-to-head matches; 5) Goal difference in h-t-h matches; 6) Goals scored in h-t-h matches; 7) Away goals in h-t-h matches; 8) Draw.
(C) Champions; (P) Promoted; (R) Relegated

== Results grid ==
Each team plays every opponent once home and away for a total of 18 matches per club, and 90 matches altogether.

| Home \ Away | AUG | DAL | EIN | KFG | KFJ | KHL | KVE | SIN | VÆN | ÆGI |
|---|---|---|---|---|---|---|---|---|---|---|
| Augnablik | — | 3–1 | 2–0 | 2–3 | 4–3 | 2–2 | 1–0 | 3–2 | 1–1 | 2–2 |
| Dalvík/Reynir | 3–2 | — | 1–1 | 2–0 | 0–0 | 1–1 | 0–0 | 2–0 | 3–1 | 3–0 |
| Einherji | 3–1 | 0–3 | — | 1–3 | 2–0 | 2–1 | 2–1 | 3–2 | 2–0 | 2–1 |
| KFG | 6–0 | 0–0 | 3–2 | — | 1–0 | 1–2 | 3–2 | 2–3 | 3–0 | 4–1 |
| KF | 2–0 | 2–1 | 3–1 | 6–2 | — | 4–2 | 2–0 | 0–3 | 2–0 | 2–0 |
| KH | 5–0 | 0–1 | 3–2 | 1–1 | 3–1 | — | 1–2 | 3–1 | 0–2 | 2–0 |
| KV | 2–3 | 3–2 | 3–0 | 2–3 | 2–0 | 2–2 | — | 4–1 | 0–0 | 3–3 |
| Sindri | 3–0 | 2–3 | 3–2 | 2–1 | 0–1 | 0–1 | 3–1 | — | 1–7 | 0–0 |
| Vængir Júpiters | 2–1 | 1–0 | 2–1 | 2–4 | 2–0 | 2–1 | 2–2 | 7–1 | — | 1–3 |
| Ægir | 5–0 | 0–1 | 0–3 | 2–3 | 0–1 | 0–3 | 1–2 | 2–0 | 0–2 | — |

Updated to match(es) played on 29 September 2018. Source: ksí.is
Legend: Blue = home team win; Yellow = draw; Red = away team win.

== Top goalscorers ==
As of matches played on 29 September 2018.

| Rank | Player | Club | Goals |
|---|---|---|---|
| 1 | (Iceland) Jóhann Ólafur Jóhannsson | KFG | 15 |
| 2 | (Iceland) Númi Kárason | Einherji | 11 |
| 3 | (Iceland) Nökkvi Þeyr Þórisson | Dalvík/Reynir | 10 |
| 3 | (Iceland) Ingólfur Sigurðsson | KH | 10 |
| 5 | (Iceland) Magnús Björgvinsson | KFG | 9 |
| 5 | (Iceland) Daníel Rögnvaldsson | Vængir Júpiters | 9 |
