= 2018 2. deild karla =

2. deild karla
- Season: 2018
- Champions: Afturelding
- Matches played: 132
- Goals scored: 439 (3.33 per match)
- Top goalscorer: Andri Freyr Jónasson (21 goals)
- Biggest home win: Leiknir F. 8-0 Tindastóll (2 September 2018)
- Biggest away win: Þróttur V. 1-6 Afturelding (29 June 2018); Höttur 0-5 Vestri (28 July 2018)
- Highest scoring: Afturelding 7-2 Tindastóll (12 May 2018)
- All statistics correct as of 22 September 2018.

The 2018 2. deild karla was the 53rd season of third-tier football in Iceland. Twelve teams contested the league. Play began on 5 May and conclude on 22 September.

== Teams ==
The league will be contested by twelve clubs, eight of which played in the division during the 2017 season. There are four new clubs from the previous campaign:

- Leiknir F. and Grótta were relegated from the 2017 1. deild karla, replacing Njarðvík and Magni who were promoted to the 2018 1. deild karla
- Kári and Þróttur V. were promoted from the 2017 3. deild karla, in place of KV and Sindri who were relegated to the 2018 3. deild karla

=== Club information ===
Location of teams in the 2018 2. deild karla

Team	Location	Stadium	2017 season
Afturelding	Mosfellsbær	Varmárvöllur	4th
Fjarðabyggð	Reyðarfjörður	Fjarðabyggðarhöllin	8th
Grótta	Seltjarnarnes	Vivaldivöllurinn	12th in 1. deild
Huginn	Seyðisfjörður	Seyðisfjarðarvöllur	5th
Höttur	Egilsstaðir	Vilhjálmsvöllur	10th
Kári	Akranes	Akraneshöllin	1st in 3. deild
Leiknir F.	Reyðarfjörður	Fjarðabyggðarhöllin	11th in 1. deild
Tindastóll	Sauðárkrókur	Sauðárkróksvöllur	6th
Vestri	Ísafjörður	Torfnesvöllur	9th
Víðir	Garður	Nesfisk-völlurinn	3rd
Völsungur	Húsavík	Húsavíkurvöllur	7th
Þróttur V.	Vogar	Vogabæjarvöllur	2nd in 3. deild

== League table ==
Pos	Team	Pld	W	D	L	GF	GA	GD	Pts	Promotion or relegation
1	Afturelding (C, P)	22	13	6	3	58	27	+31	45	Promotion to 2019 1. deild karla
2	Grótta (P)	22	14	3	5	54	25	+29	45	Promotion to 2019 1. deild karla
3	Vestri	22	13	5	4	42	17	+25	44	
4	Völsungur	22	12	4	6	45	31	+14	40	
5	Kári	22	12	2	8	46	44	+2	38	
6	Þróttur V.	22	9	6	7	36	31	+5	33	
7	Fjarðabyggð	22	8	4	10	27	32	−5	28	
8	Tindastóll	22	7	3	12	28	53	−25	24	
9	Víðir	22	6	5	11	28	36	−8	23	
10	Leiknir F.	22	5	7	10	31	36	−5	22	
11	Höttur (R)	22	5	6	11	31	49	−18	21	Relegation to 2019 3. deild karla
12	Huginn (R)	22	1	3	18	13	55	−42	6	Relegation to 2019 3. deild karla

Updated to match(es) played on 22 September 2018. Source: KSÍ (in Icelandic), Soccerway
Rules for classification: 1) Points; 2) Goal difference; 3) Goals scored; 4) Head-to-head points; 5) Head-to-head goal difference; 6) Head-to-head goals scored; 7) Head-to-head away goals scored; 8) Play-off (only for deciding champion); 9) Draw.
(C) Champions; (P) Promoted; (R) Relegated

== Results ==
Each team plays every opponent once home and away for a total of 22 matches per club, and 132 matches altogether.

Home \ Away	AFT	KFF	GRÓ	HUG	HÖT	KÁR	LEF	TIN	VES	VIÐ	VÖL	ÞRÓ
Afturelding		1–0	2–2	4–0	2–2	5–1	4–1	7–2	0–0	2–1	1–2	1–2
Fjarðabyggð	0–3		1–2	2–0	4–3	3–1	1–0	1–0	0–1	1–0	1–2	2–2
Grótta	1–2	6–0		4–0	5–0	4–1	3–0	5–2	3–2	4–2	2–1	1–2
Huginn	1–3	0–1	0–1		1–0	1–3	1–1	0–1	0–1	1–2	0–3	1–1
Höttur	1–3	1–1	1–1	4–2		4–1	2–0	3–1	0–5	0–0	1–1	1–3
Kári	2–3	1–5	1–0	4–1	2–2		3–2	5–2	1–2	3–2	4–2	3–1
Leiknir F.	2–2	1–1	2–1	2–0	1–0	0–1		8–0	2–2	3–0	2–2	1–3
Tindastóll	3–2	1–0	0–4	5–1	1–0	1–2	2–2		2–0	1–3	3–2	0–0
Vestri	1–3	1–0	6–0	1–0	5–0	2–2	3–0	1–1		3–1	2–0	2–0
Víðir	1–1	2–1	1–2	1–1	3–1	2–3	1–0	2–0	0–0		2–3	1–2
Völsungur	1–1	1–1	2–3	6–2	2–3	1–0	4–1	1–0	2–1	3–0		2–1
Þróttur V.	1–6	3–1	0–0	5–1	5–2	0–2	0–0	4–0	0–1	1–1	0–2	

Updated to match(es) played on 22 September 2018. Source:
Legend: Blue = home team win; Yellow = draw; Red = away team win.

== Top goalscorers ==
As of matches played on

Rank	Player	Club	Goals
1	(Iceland) Andri Freyr Jónasson	Afturelding	21
2	(Iceland) Andri Júlíusson	Kári	14
2	(Iceland) Pétur Bjarnason	Vestri	14
4	(Iceland) Guðmundur Óli Steingrímsson	Völsungur	11
4	(Iceland) Óliver Dagur Thorlacius	Grótta	11
4	(Canada) Stefan Lamanna	Tindastóll	11
