= Devonte Small =

American-born Guyanese footballer

Personal information
- Full name: Devonte Daryll Delroy Small
- Date of birth: 25 March 1995 (age 31)
- Place of birth: San Antonio, Texas, United States
- Height: 5 ft 9 in (1.75 m)
- Position: Midfielder

Youth career
- Roosevelt Rough Riders
- –2013: Classics Elite

College career
Years	Team	Apps	(Gls)
2013–2016	Oregon State Beavers	54	(4)

Senior career*
Years	Team	Apps	(Gls)
2015	Lane United		
2016	Portland Timbers U23s	4	(0)
2017	Reynir Sandgerði	6	(0)

International career^{‡}
2017–	Guyana	2	(0)
- * Club domestic league appearances and goals as of 12:57, 1 August 2018 (UTC) ‡ National team caps and goals as of 12:57, 1 August 2018 (UTC)

Devonte Daryll Delroy Small (born 25 March 1995) is a professional footballer who plays as a midfielder.

Born in the United States, he has represented Guyana at international level.

== Club career ==
Small played for both Lane United and the Portland Timbers U23s while studying at the Oregon State University.

After leaving university in the United States, Small moved to Iceland and signed for third division side Reynir Sandgerði. He made six appearances in the league and scored three goals in two appearances in the Icelandic Cup during the 2017 season.

== Career statistics ==
=== Club ===
As of 1 August 2018.

Club	Season	League			Cup		Other		Total	
Club	Season	Division	Apps	Goals	Apps	Goals	Apps	Goals	Apps	Goals
Portland Timbers U23s	2016	PDL	4	0	0	0	0	0	4	0
Reynir Sandgerði	2017	3. deild karla	6	0	2 (Note: Appearances in the Icelandic Cup)	3	0	0	8	3
Career total			10	0	2	3	0	0	12	3

=== International ===
As of matches played 1 August 2018.

National team	Year	Apps	Goals
Guyana	2017	2	0
Guyana	2018	0	0
Total		2	0
