= Nicola Camolese =

Italian footballer

Personal information
- Date of birth: 2 April 2005 (age 21)
- Place of birth: Treviso, Italy
- Height: 1.73 m (5 ft 8 in)
- Position: Left-back

Team information
- Current team: Gela (on loan from Novara)

Youth career
- Liventina
- 2019–2022: Venezia

Senior career*
Years	Team	Apps	(Gls)
2022–2024	Venezia	0	(0)
2024–	Novara	0	(0)
2025–2026	→ Dekani (loan)	5	(0)
2026–	→ Gela (loan)	0	(0)
- * Club domestic league appearances and goals as of 8 February 2026

Nicola Camolese (born 2 April 2005) is an Italian professional footballer who plays for Serie D club Gela on loan from Novara.

== Club career ==
Nicola Camolese first played football in Motta di Livenza, before joining the Venezia FC academy in 2019.

Having made his primavera debut in February 2022, he became a full member of the under-19 team during the 2022–23 pre-season, before seeing a succession of covid cases leading to a first team call, before the first game of the season.

Camolese made his professional debut for Venezia on the 7 August 2022, replacing Bjarki Bjarkason at the 64th minute of a 2–3 Coppa Italia loss to Ascoli. Aged only 17, he had then played more minutes with the first team than with the primavera.

On 22 July 2024, Camolese signed a three-season contract with Novara in Serie C.
