= 2017 3. deild karla =

3. deild karla
- Season: 2017
- Champions: Kári
- Promoted: Kári; Þróttur V.
- Relegated: Reynir S. Berserkir
- Matches: 90
- Goals: 322 (3.58 per match)
- Top goalscorer: Alexander Már Þorláksson (17 goals)
- Biggest home win: Einherji 9–2 Berserkir (26 August 2017)
- Biggest away win: Berserkir 1–9 Kári (20 May 2017)
- Highest scoring: Einherji 9–2 Berserkir (26 August 2017)
- All statistics correct as of 16 September 2017.

The 2017 3. deild karla (English: Men's Third Division) was the 5th season of fourth-tier Icelandic football in its ten team league format. The league began on 12 May and concluded on 16 September.

== Teams ==
The league was contested by ten clubs. Eight remained in the division from the 2016 season, while four new clubs joined the 3. deild karla:

- Ægir and KF were relegated from the 2016 2. deild karla, replacing Tindastóll and Víðir who were promoted to the 2017 2. deild karla
- Berserkir and KFG were promoted from the 2016 4. deild karla, in place of KFR and KFS who were relegated to the 2017 4. deild karla

=== Club information ===
Location of teams in the 2017 3. deild karla

== 2017 Member Clubs ==
Team	Location	Stadium	2016 season
Berserkir	Reykjavík	Víkin	4. deild karla, 1st
Dalvík/Reynir	Dalvík	Dalvíkurvöllur	8th
Einherji	Vopnafjörður	Vopnafjarðarvöllur	3rd
Kári	Akranes	Akranesvöllur	4th
KF	Fjallabyggð	Ólafsfjarðarvöllur	2. deild karla, 12th
KFG	Garðabær	Samsung völlurinn	4. deild karla, 2nd
Reynir S.	Sandgerði	Sandgerðisvöllur	6th
Vængir Júpiters	Reykjavík	Egilshöll	7th
Þróttur V.	Vogar	Vogavöllur	5th
Ægir	Þorlákshöfn	Þorlákshafnarvöllur	2. deild karla, 11th

== League table ==
Pos	Team	Pld	W	D	L	GF	GA	GD	Pts	Qualification or relegation
1	Kári (C, P)	18	13	4	1	54	16	+38	43	Promotion to 2018 2 deild karla
2	Þróttur V. (P)	18	10	4	4	34	19	+15	34	Promotion to 2018 2 deild karla
3	KFG	18	10	3	5	44	31	+13	33	
4	Vængir Júpiters	18	10	3	5	32	29	+3	33	
5	KF	18	9	0	9	34	34	0	27	
6	Einherji	18	7	4	7	27	25	+2	25	
7	Ægir	18	5	6	7	37	31	+6	21	
8	Dalvík/Reynir	18	6	2	10	29	40	−11	20	
9	Reynir S. (R)	18	3	4	11	13	42	−29	13	Relegation to 2018 4. deild karla
10	Berserkir (R)	18	1	2	15	18	55	−37	5	Relegation to 2018 4. deild karla

Updated to match(es) played on 16 September 2017. Source: ksí.is
Rules for classification: 1) Points won; 2) Total goal difference; 3) Total goals scored; 4) Points in head-to-head matches; 5) Goal difference in h-t-h matches; 6) Goals scored in h-t-h matches; 7) Away goals in h-t-h matches; 8) Draw.
(C) Champions; (P) Promoted; (R) Relegated

== Results grid ==
Each team plays every opponent once home and away for a total of 18 matches per club, and 90 matches altogether.

Home \ Away	BER	DAL	EIN	KÁR	KFJ	KFG	REY	VÆN	ÞRV	ÆGI
Berserkir	—	1–2	4–0	1–9	1–3	1–5	0–1	3–4	0–2	0–3
Dalvík/Reynir	4–1	—	2–1	1–1	2–5	1–3	3–0	2–4	1–2	2–2
Einherji	9–2	1–0	—	1–1	2–0	1–3	0–0	0–1	1–1	2–1
Kári	1–0	6–1	2–0	—	6–1	2–1	4–1	3–1	0–1	0–0
KF	2–1	3–1	0–1	0–4	—	1–2	0–1	5–0	2–0	2–1
KFG	5–1	1–3	0–0	1–5	5–1	—	5–2	0–3	3–3	4–3
Reynir S.	1–0	1–2	0–4	2–2	0–3	0–1	—	0–0	2–3	0–4
Vængir Júpiters	0–0	2–0	3–1	0–2	5–3	1–0	4–1	—	0–3	3–2
Þróttur V.	2–0	3–1	1–2	1–2	2–0	1–3	5–0	1–1	—	1–1
Ægir	2–2	3–1	4–1	3–4	0–3	2–2	2–2	4–0	0–2	—

Updated to match(es) played on 16 September 2017. Source: ksí.is
Legend: Blue = home team win; Yellow = draw; Red = away team win.

== Top goalscorers ==
As of matches played on 16 September 2017.

Rank	Player	Club	Goals
1	(Iceland) Alexander Már Þorláksson	Kári	17
2	(Wales) Jonathan Hood	Ægir	13
3	(Iceland) Aron Grétar Jafetsson	KFG	11
3	(Bulgaria) Todor Hristov	Einherji	11
3	(Iceland) Jóhann Ólafur Jóhannsson	KFG	11
6	(Iceland) Andri Björn Sigurðsson	Þróttur V.	9
7	(Iceland) Guðmundur Garðar Sigfússon	Ægir	8
8	(Slovenia) Tomislav Mišura	Reynir S.	7
8	(Iceland) Alexander Bjarki Rúnarsson	Vængir Júpiters	7
10	(Iceland) Andri Júlíusson	Kári	6
10	(Iceland) Karel Sigurðsson	Berserkir	6
10	(Serbia) Ljubomir Delic	KF	6
10	(Iceland) Fannar Daði Malmquist Gíslason	Dalvík/Reynir	6
10	(Iceland) Tryggvi Magnússon	Vængir Júpiters	6
