= Joey Guðjónsson =

Icelandic footballer and manager

Personal information
- Full name: Jóhannes Karl Guðjónsson
- Date of birth: 25 May 1980 (age 46)
- Place of birth: Akranes, Iceland
- Height: 5 ft 8 in (1.73 m)
- Position: Midfielder

Youth career
- 1994–1997: ÍA

Senior career*
Years	Team	Apps	(Gls)
1997	KA	5	(0)
1998	ÍA	8	(1)
1998–2000	Racing Genk	6	(0)
1999–2000	→ MVV (loan)	20	(5)
2000–2001	RKC Waalwijk	35	(6)
2001–2004	Betis	12	(0)
2003	→ Aston Villa (loan)	11	(2)
2003–2004	→ Wolverhampton Wanderers (loan)	11	(0)
2004–2006	Leicester City	77	(10)
2006–2007	AZ	5	(0)
2007–2010	Burnley	88	(7)
2010–2012	Huddersfield Town	45	(2)
2012–2013	ÍA	41	(8)
2014	Fram Reykjavík	18	(2)
2015	Fylkir	16	(2)
2016–2017	HK	13	(0)
Total		411	(45)

International career
1998	Iceland U-19	7	(1)
1999–2001	Iceland U-21	10	(3)
2001–2007	Iceland	34	(1)

Managerial career
- 2016–2017: HK
- 2018–2021: ÍA
- 2024–2025: AB
- * Club domestic league appearances and goals

Jóhannes Karl "Joey" Guðjónsson (born 25 May 1980) is an Icelandic former professional footballer and manager. He earned 34 caps for the Iceland national team between 2001 and 2007.

His clubs include Real Betis, Aston Villa, Wolverhampton Wanderers, Leicester City, AZ and Burnley. He has played in five top-flight league across Europe.

== Club career ==
=== Iceland, Belgium & the Netherlands ===
Jóhannes Karl began his professional career in the Icelandic Premier Division with KA of Akureyri at the age of 17. It was not long before he moved abroad, and in 1998, he was transferred to top-flight Belgian outfit, Racing Genk. He made eight appearances for ÍA, scoring once.

He only played a handful of matches for Genk and the following season he was loaned out to newly promoted Eredivisie side MVV. Again, he only spent one season with the club and then moved to another Dutch club, RKC Waalwijk in a permanent deal, where he had another season-long stay, making 35 appearances and scoring six goals for the Dutch side.

=== Betis ===
In 2001, he moved to La Liga side Real Betis, his fourth new club in four years, signing for a fee of £500,000 from RKC Waalwijk. In his first year, Jóhannes Karl started five matches and made six substitute appearances in his first season.

Jóhannes Karl found his chances limited in the following season after only making one appearances for Betis in the 2002–03 season, prompting a loan move to Premier League side Aston Villa. He made his debut for Villa in their 5–2 away win at Middlesbrough on 28 January 2003, scoring his first goal for the club. He scored twice in eleven appearances with his other goal coming against Leeds.

=== Wolverhampton Wanderers ===
Jóhannes Karl spent the 2003–04 season on loan at Wolverhampton Wanderers as they battled against relegation from the Premier League, appearing eleven times in the league, 16 in total. Jóhannes Karl made his Wolves debut coming on as a substitute in their 0–0 league draw at home to Portsmouth on 30 August 2003. His first start of the season came in their 2–0 League Cup win over Darlington on 23 September 2003 when he scored his first and only goal for the club. He made his first league start for Wolves in a 0–0 draw at Fulham in October. Jóhannes Karl returned to Real Betis at the end of the season after making 15 appearances for Wolves in all competitions during the 2003–04 season.

After returning to his parent club in the summer, he ended up making a return to England, but to Leicester City rather than Wolves.

=== Leicester City ===
Jóhannes Karl joined Leicester on a free transfer in 2004 from Spanish side Real Betis. He made his Leicester debut coming on as a 73rd-minute substitute in their 2–1 away victory at Derby County on the opening day of the 2004–05 season. He made his first start of the season in a 1–0 home defeat to Watford on 21 August 2004. Jóhannes Karl became a regular first-team player as the Foxes struggled to make an immediate return to the top flight. He scored his first goal for the Foxes in a 3–2 home defeat to Preston North End in League Cup scoring a 68th-minute penalty on 2 October 2004. His first league goals came in a 2–2 home draw with Crewe Alexandra a month later on 2 November 2004. Jóhannes Karl made 41 appearances in all for Leicester during his first season at the club, scoring four times in all with two of them coming in the league.

Jóhannes Karl made his first appearance of the 2005–06 season on the opening day of the season in Leicester's 4–1 defeat away at Sheffield United. His first goals of the league campaign came in a 2–2 draw away at Crewe Alexandra on 20 August 2005. His second came just three days later in a 3–0 away win over Bury in the League Cup. He then scored a further two in a 2–2 draw at home to Watford on 22 November. On 4 May 2006 Jóhannes Karl scored two goals against Hull City including the winner scored in the 84th minute from within his own half in a 3–2 win.

Jóhannes Karl finished the season as joint top goal scorer with nine goals in all competitions for Leicester. He made 48 appearances with 42 of them coming in the league during the 2005–06 season.

He won the club's player and goal of the season awards in their end of season ceremony. His winning goal came against Hull City when he scored from the halfway line, a strike which also won several other goal of the month awards and the Central Soccer Night goal of the season.

Jóhannes Karl left Leicester at the end of the season to join Dutch side AZ after making 77 appearances and scoring 10 league goals for The Foxes over two seasons.

=== AZ ===
In February 2006, with his contract starting to run out, he agreed a move to Dutch side AZ, who had been playing in European competitions and had spent most of that season in the top four of the Dutch Eredivisie. He completed the switch and made his debut for AZ on 4 August 2006, in a friendly against Arsenal, coming on as a 64th-minute substitute. AZ lost the game 3–0, which was the first to be played at AZ's new DSB Stadion.

Jóhannes Karl did not make his league debut for AZ until 29 October 2006, coming on as a 76th-minute substitute in their 5–1 win at home to Utrecht, he then made his first appearance in the UEFA Cup four days later, coming on as an 89th-minute substitute in their 5–2 win away at Swiss side Grasshoppers. He made his first start of the season in their 3–1 win away at Heerenveen on 26 November 2006.

However, he struggled to establish himself in the AZ team, and quickly returned to English football in January 2007, just five months after joining the club. He had been linked with a return to Leicester City, but this was in the middle of Milan Mandaric's takeover of the club so the Foxes could not sort out their finances in time. He instead joined Burnley for £150,000 on a three-and-a-half-year deal, after starting just once in the league. Jóhannes Karl's last game for AZ came in their 2–2 draw at home to Slovan Liberec in the UEFA Cup.

=== Burnley ===
Jóhannes Karl signed for Burnley in January 2007, on a three-and-a-half-year deal. After personal reasons kept him out of some of the remaining games of the season, his pre-season form saw him move back into the starting line-up at the start of the 2007–08 season, although he quickly fell out of favour. He was then dropped from the squad entirely under Steve Cotterill after failing to impress but his fortunes changed when Owen Coyle took over as Burnley manager and he found himself back on the bench. He scored his first goal for Burnley as they beat Watford 2–1 at Vicarage Road on 27 November 2007 in Coyle's second game in charge. He was frequently used as a late substitute for the remainder of the season. On 15 December 2007, Jóhannes Karl was sent off in the 90th minute against rival Preston North End which Burnley lose 3–2. On 4 March 2008, Jóhannes Karl was sent off again in the 76th minute this 2007–08 season in a 2–0 loss against Hull City when he was fell to the floor clutching his face in the area and after consulting with his assistant which saw Hull City midfielder Jay-Jay Okocha sent off at the same minutes.

After returning from international duty with Iceland during the summer, Jóhannes Karl made his first appearance of the 2008–09 season on the opening day of the season in Burnley's 4–1 defeat at Sheffield Wednesday. His first goal of the season came at Swansea City, after an injury to Kevin McDonald saw him play 45 minutes. He scored his second goal for the Clarets in a 1–1 draw on 20 September. This earned him a starting role for the next two games, in which he scored again against Preston North End, this time from 30 yards. Jóhannes Karl had to wait until 13 December 2008 when he score a brace against Southampton on an early minutes in a 3–2 win. Jóhannes Karl had to wait again until 14 March 2009 when he scored the fifth goal in the match against Nottingham Forest in a 5–0 win. On 3 May 2009, Jóhannes Karl scored the fourth goal against Bristol City in a 4–0 win, which send Burnley to qualify via the Championship Play-offs. Jóhannes Karl made 42 league appearances, scoring six times in the league as Burnley won promotion to the Premier League via the Championship Play-offs.

Jóhannes Karl played 14 times in all competitions in the 2009–10 season, with ten coming in the league but he only started once for The Clarets in the league with two more starts coming in the League Cup and one in the FA Cup. His first appearance of the season came on 19 August in Burnley's 1–0 win over Manchester United after coming on as a 72nd-minute substitute for . His only start of the league campaign came in their 5–0 defeat at Tottenham Hotspur on 26 September 2009.

In April 2010, he was suspended for two weeks by Burnley after comments he made to an Icelandic website where he questioned the team spirit under manager Brian Laws. Jóhannes Karl was released by Burnley at the end of the 2009–10 season, after Burnley were relegated from the Premier League. He made 88 appearances and scored six times for The Clarets over three years.

=== Huddersfield Town ===
==== 2010–11 season ====
Following his release from Burnley, Jóhannes Karl signed for League One side Huddersfield Town on 2 June 2010. He joined the club on a two-year contract, despite having offers from a higher division, stating the ambition of Town's management team and board persuaded him.

He made his Terriers debut in the 3–0 win over Notts County at Meadow Lane on 7 August 2010. On 16 October, he scored his first goal for the club in a league match against Southampton at the Galpharm Stadium where Huddersfield won 2–0. His second goal came in the 1–0 victory away at Charlton Athletic on 16 April 2011, he then went on to finish his first season with the club on 48 appearances in all with 38 coming in league and scoring twice during the 2010–11 campaign.

==== 2011–12 season ====
Despite his impressive form during his first season at the club, he struggled to make the first team during the 2011–12 season, not making the first team squad once under manager Lee Clark. He made his first appearance of the campaign in the 2–0 home victory over Exeter City on 25 February 2012 in new manager Simon Grayson's first game in charge, coming on as a 63rd-minute substitute to a standing ovation. After making seven more appearances this season, Jóhannes Karl made his last appearance for Huddersfield Town after coming on for Antony Kay in the 69th minute in a 1–0 win over Charlton Athletic on 24 March 2012.

On 27 April 2012, his contract at the club was terminated by mutual consent, citing "family reasons", and he returned to his native Iceland after making 56 appearances for the Terriers over two seasons scoring twice. Jóhannes Karl told the club website:

"I would have liked to have played more during my two seasons, but that is football and you have to respect those decisions and the people who make them. I've certainly enjoyed my time here though. We have a great squad here and everyone, including the off-the-field staff, is pushing in the same direction. I believe this club deserves to be in the Championship and it would be a brilliant achievement to get there through the play-offs this season – and I believe that with the quality that we have, we will."

His release by the club saw Grayson express sadness to see Jóhannes Karl go due to his contribution to the side's efforts that season.

=== Returning to Iceland ===
The following day he signed for his hometown club, ÍA. On his move, Jóhannes Karl was appointed captain. Jóhannes Karl made his debut in over 14 years since leaving Iceland in a 1–0 win over Breiðablik and scored the next game on 10 May 2012 in a 3–2 win over KR where the first for the club in a match.

On 1 January 2014, Jóhannes Karl moved to Fram Reykjavík. He was handed the number 10 jersey. On 30 October 2014, he moved to Fylkir.

== International career ==
Jóhannes Karl made his international debut for the Iceland national team on 15 August 2001, in a 1–1 friendly draw with Poland. He scored once for the national team in a 1–1 draw with Norway on 22 May 2002.

Jóhannes Karl was involved in Iceland's qualification for both the 2002 FIFA World Cup when he made three appearances during qualification when Iceland finished fourth in group 3, including a 3–1 home victory over the Czech Republic as well as away defeats to Northern Ireland and Denmark and 2006 FIFA World Cup when he made four appearances during qualification when Iceland finished fifth in group 8, playing a total of seven World Cup qualifying games.

He was also involved in Iceland's qualification campaigns for the UEFA European Championships. Including Euro 2004 where he started in Iceland's games aniseed Scotland which they lost 2–1 as well as both their 2–1 wins over the Faroe Islands, a 3–0 away win over Lithuania and Iceland's 0–0 home draw with Germany.

Jóhannes Karl picked up his 16th and 17th caps for Iceland against England and Japan in a mini tournament held in Manchester prior to Euro 2004. Jóhannes Karl has earned 34 caps scoring once for Iceland.

== Coaching career ==
Jóhannes Karl was appointed player-manager of HK in 2016 and served in that role through the 2017 season. Before the 2018 season he moved to fellow 1. deild karla club ÍA, his hometown club. He joined as manager, retiring from playing. He guided ÍA to a promotion to the top tier Úrvalsdeild in his first season in charge and kept them up the following three seasons. Before the 2022 season he was hired as the assistant manager of Iceland.

In May 2024, he was announced as the new manager of Danish 2nd Division side AB. On 15 November 2025, the club announced that Guðjónsson had decided to step back from the position.

== Personal life ==
Jóhannes Karl married his longtime girlfriend, Jófríður María Guðlaugsdóttir in June 2006. The couple have four sons, Ísak Bergmann (2003), Jóel Thor (2005), Daniel Ingi (2007) and the youngest, Emil Karl (2010). His father, Guðjón Þórðarson, managed Stoke City, Notts County, Barnsley and the Iceland national team. He has three brothers who have also played professional football, Þórður (Thordur or Doddi), Bjarni and Björn Bergmann Sigurðarson. Another brother, Atli Guðjónsson, played in the Icelandic leagues before retiring.

== Career statistics ==
=== Club ===
Appearances and goals by club, season and competition
Club	Season	League			National Cup		League Cup		Continental		Other		Total	
Club	Season	Division	Apps	Goals	Apps	Goals	Apps	Goals	Apps	Goals	Apps	Goals	Apps	Goals
KA Akureyri	1997	1. deild karla	5	0	0	0	–		–		–		5	0
ÍA	1998	Úrvalsdeild	8	1	0	0	–		–		–		8	1
Genk	1998–99	Belgian First Division	6	0	0	0	–		–				6	0
MVV (loan)	1999–2000	Eredivisie	20	5	0	0	–		–		–		20	5
RKC Waalwijk	2000–01	Eredivisie	31	4	0	0	–		–		2 (Note: Appearances in UEFA Intertoto Cup)	0	33	4
RKC Waalwijk	2001–02	Eredivisie	4	2	0	0	–		–		1	0	5	2
RKC Waalwijk	Total		35	6	0	0	0	0	0	0	3	0	38	6
Betis	2001–02	La Liga	11	0	1	0	–		–		–		12	0
Betis	2002–03	La Liga	1	0	0	0	–		–		–		1	0
Betis	Total		12	0	1	0	0	0	2	0	0	0	13	0
Aston Villa (loan)	2002–03	Premier League	11	2	0	0	0	0	–		–		11	2
Wolverhampton Wanderers (loan)	2003–04	Premier League	11	0	2	0	3	1	–		–		16	1
Leicester City	2004–05	Championship	35	2	5	1	1	1	–		–		41	4
Leicester City	2005–06	Championship	42	8	2	0	4	1	–		–		48	9
Leicester City	Total		77	10	7	1	5	2	0	0	0	0	89	13
AZ	2006–07	Eredivisie	5	0	0	0	–		2	0	–		7	0
Burnley	2006–07	Championship	11	0	0	0	0	0	–		–		11	0
Burnley	2007–08	Championship	28	1	1	0	1	0	–		–		30	1
Burnley	2008–09	Championship	39	6	5	0	7	0	–		3 (Note: Appearance in Championship play-offs)	0	54	6
Burnley	2009–10	Premier League	10	0	2	0	2	0	–		–		14	0
Burnley	Total		88	7	9	0	13	0	0	0	3	0	113	7
Huddersfield Town	2010–11	League One	37	2	3	0	2	0	–		6 (Note: Five appearances ub EFL Trophy, one appearance in League One play-offs)	0	48	2
Huddersfield Town	2011–12	League One	8	0	0	0	0	0	–		–		8	0
Huddersfield Town	Total		45	2	3	0	2	0	0	0	6	0	56	2
ÍA	2012	Úrvalsdeild	21	3	1	1	–		–		–		22	4
ÍA	2013	Úrvalsdeild	20	5	2	1	–		–		–		22	6
ÍA	Total		41	8	3	2	0	0	0	0	0	0	44	10
Fram Reykjavík	2014	Úrvalsdeild	18	2	2	0	–		2	0	–		22	2
Fylkir	2015	Úrvalsdeild	16	2	1	0	–		–		–		17	2
HK	2016	1. deild karla	9	0	0	0	–		–		–		9	0
HK	2017	1. deild karla	4	0	0	0	–		–		–		4	0
HK	Total		13	0	0	0	0	0	0	0	0	0	13	0
Career total			411	45	28	3	23	3	4	0	12	0	478	51

=== International ===
Score and result list Iceland's goal tally first, score column indicates score after Joey goal.

International goal scored by Joey Guðjónsson
No.	Date	Venue	Opponent	Score	Result	Competition	Ref.
1	22 May 2002	Bodø, Norway	Norway	1–0	1–1	Friendly match	

== Honours ==
Burnley

- Football League Championship play-offs: 2009
