= 2016 1. deild karla =

1. deild karla
- Season: 2016
- Champions: KA (2nd title)
- Promoted: KA; Grindavík
- Relegated: Fjarðabyggð; Huginn
- Matches: 132
- Goals: 373 (2.83 per match)
- Top goalscorer: Alexander Veigar Þórarinsson; Gunnar Örvar Stefánsson (14 goals)
- Biggest home win: Grindavík 5–0 Leiknir F. (21 May 2016); Grindavík 5–0 Þór (9 July 2016)
- Biggest away win: HK 2–7 Leiknir F. (24 September 2016)
- Highest scoring: Fjarðabyggð 4–4 HK (4 June 2016)
- Longest winning run: 6 matches: KA; Þór
- Longest unbeaten run: 13 matches: Grindavík
- Longest winless run: 11 matches: Fjarðabyggð
- Longest losing run: 6 matches: Fjarðabyggð
- All statistics correct as of 15 October 2016.

The 2016 1. deild karla (English: Men's First Division) was the 62nd season of second-tier Icelandic football. The league began on 6 May and concluded on 24 September.

== Teams ==
The league will be contested by twelve clubs. Eight remained in the division from the 2015 season, while four new clubs joined the 1. deild karla:

- Keflavík and Leiknir R. were relegated from the 2015 Úrvalsdeild, replacing Víkingur Ólafsvík and Þróttur Reykjavík who were promoted to the 2016 Úrvalsdeild
- Huginn and Leiknir F. were promoted from the 2015 2. deild karla, in place of BÍ/Bolungarvík and Grótta who were relegated to the 2016 2. deild karla

=== Club information ===
Location of teams in the 2016 1. deild karla

Team	Location	Stadium	2015 season
Fjarðabyggð	Fjarðabyggð	Eskjuvöllur	7th
Fram	Reykjavík	Framvöllur - Úlfarsárdal	9th
Grindavík	Grindavík	Grindavíkurvöllur	5th
Haukar	Hafnarfjörður	Schenkervöllurinn	6th
HK	Kópavogur	Kórinn	8th
Huginn	Seyðisfjörður	Seyðisfjarðarvöllur	2. deild, 1st
KA	Akureyri	Akureyrarvöllur	3rd
Keflavík	Keflavík	Keflavíkurvöllur	Úrvalsdeild, 12th
Leiknir F.	Fáskrúðsfjörður	Búðagrund	2. deild, 2nd
Leiknir R.	Reykjavík	Leiknisvöllur	Úrvalsdeild, 11th
Selfoss	Selfoss	Selfossvöllur	10th
Þór	Akureyri	Þórsvöllur	4th

== League table ==
Pos	Team	Pld	W	D	L	GF	GA	GD	Pts	Promotion or relegation
1	KA (C, P)	22	16	3	3	42	16	+26	51	Promotion to the 2017 Úrvalsdeild
2	Grindavík (P)	22	12	6	4	50	21	+29	42	Promotion to the 2017 Úrvalsdeild
3	Keflavík	22	8	11	3	31	20	+11	35	
4	Þór	22	10	3	9	34	38	−4	33	
5	Haukar	22	9	4	9	31	35	−4	31	
6	Fram	22	8	6	8	25	29	−4	30	
7	Leiknir R.	22	8	5	9	21	28	−7	29	
8	Selfoss	22	6	10	6	28	25	+3	28	
9	HK	22	5	7	10	32	45	−13	22	
10	Leiknir F.	22	6	3	13	32	45	−13	21	
11	Huginn (R)	22	5	6	11	20	34	−14	21	Relegation to the 2017 2. deild karla
12	Fjarðabyggð (R)	22	3	8	11	26	36	−10	17	Relegation to the 2017 2. deild karla

Updated to match(es) played on 24 September 2016. Source: ksi.is
Rules for classification: 1) points; 2) goal difference; 3) number of goals scored.
(C) Champions; (P) Promoted; (R) Relegated

== Results grid ==
Each team plays every opponent once home and away for a total of 22 matches per club, and 132 matches altogether.

Home \ Away	KFF	FRA	GRI	HAU	HK	HUG	KAK	KEF	LEF	LRE	SEL	ÞÓR
Fjarðabyggð		2–1	2–2	1–2	4–4	1–2	1–4	2–2	2–2	1–1	0–0	2–3
Fram	2–1		0–2	1–1	2–1	2–0	1–3	1–0	3–1	2–1	1–1	2–1
Grindavík	1–0	0–0		3–2	4–0	2–2	2–2	1–0	5–0	4–0	1–1	5–0
Haukar	0–3	3–1	0–4		1–1	3–0	4–1	4–3	1–0	2–1	1–1	3–2
Handknattleiksfélag Kópavogs	0–0	2–0	2–1	1–1		1–1	2–4	1–1	2–7	2–1	0–3	1–2
Huginn	1–0	0–1	0–1	1–0	0–4		1–0	0–0	0–2	0–1	3–3	1–2
KA	2–0	3–0	2–1	0–1	2–0	2–1		1–1	4–0	3–1	1–0	1–0
Keflavík	2–1	2–2	2–0	1–0	3–2	0–0	0–0		4–0	0–0	3–0	2–2
Leiknir F.	0–1	3–2	1–4	4–0	0–0	2–4	0–1	2–3		1–0	1–1	3–2
Leiknir R.	0–0	2–1	0–3	1–0	4–1	1–1	0–2	0–0	2–1		0–3	2–0
Selfoss	2–1	0–0	1–1	1–0	3–4	4–1	0–2	0–0	3–2	0–1		0–1
Þór A.	3–1	0–0	4–3	4–2	2–1	2–1	0–3	1–2	1–0	1–2	1–1	

Updated to match(es) played on 24 September 2016. Source: ksi.is
Legend: Blue = home team win; Yellow = draw; Red = away team win.

== Top goalscorers ==
As of matches played 24 September 2016

Rank	Player	Club	Goals
1	(Iceland) Alexander Veigar Þórarinsson	Grindavík	14
1	(Iceland) Gunnar Örvar Stefánsson	Þór	14
3	(Iceland) Hákon Ingi Jónsson	HK	13
4	(Iceland) Elfar Árni Aðalsteinsson	KA	10
4	(Iceland) Kristófer Páll Viðarsson	Leiknir F.	10
6	(Croatia) Ivan Bubalo	Fram	9
6	(Cape Verde) Elton Renato Livramento Barros	Haukar	9
8	(Iceland) Ásgeir Sigurgeirsson	KA	8
9	(Iceland) Víkingur Pálmason	Fjarðabyggð	7
9	(Iceland) Andri Rúnar Bjarnason	Grindavík	7
9	(Iceland) Sigurbergur Elísson	Keflavík	7
