= 2001–02 Real Betis season =

Real Betis
2001–02 season
- President: Manuel Ruiz de Lopera
- Head coach: Juande Ramos
- Stadium: Estadio Manuel Ruiz de Lopera
- La Liga: 6th
- Copa del Rey: Round of 64
- Average home league attendance: 36,842
Home colours	Away colours

The 2001–02 Real Betis season was Real Betis's first season back in top-division of the Spanish football league, the La Liga, and the 94th as a football club. Besides the La Liga, the club also competed in the 2001–02 Copa del Rey, losing in the round of 64 to Segunda División B side AD Ceuta.

== Competitions ==
=== Overview ===
Competition	First match	Last match	Starting round	Final position	Record							
Competition	First match	Last match	Starting round	Final position	Pld	W	D	L	GF	GA	GD	Win %
La Liga	26 August 2001	11 May 2002	Matchday 1	6th	38	15	14	9	42	34	+8	39.47
Copa del Rey	10 October 2001		Round of 64	Round of 64	1	0	0	1	1	4	−3	0.00
Total					39	15	14	10	43	38	+5	38.46

Source: Soccerway

=== La Liga ===
==== League table ====
Pos	Team	Pld	W	D	L	GF	GA	GD	Pts	Qualification or relegation
4	Barcelona	38	18	10	10	65	37	+28	64	Qualification for the Champions League third qualifying round
5	Celta Vigo	38	16	12	10	64	46	+18	60	Qualification for the UEFA Cup first round
6	Real Betis	38	15	14	9	42	34	+8	59	Qualification for the UEFA Cup first round
7	Alavés (Note: Since Deportivo and Real Madrid, finalists of 2001–02 Copa del Rey, were qualified for the 2002–03 UEFA Champions League, Alavés entered UEFA Cup as best qualified in no european places (7th placed))	38	17	3	18	41	44	−3	54	Qualification for the UEFA Cup first round
8	Sevilla	38	14	11	13	51	40	+11	53 (Note: SEV: 7 pts → SEV 3–3 ATH; ATH: 7 pts → ATH 0–1 SEV; MLG: 3 pts)	

Source: LFP
Rules for classification: 1st points; 2nd head-to-head points; 3rd head-to-head goal difference; 4th head-to-head goals scored; 5th goal difference; 6th number of goals scored; 7th Fair-play points

==== Results summary ====
Overall								Home						Away					
Pld	W	D	L	GF	GA	GD	Pts	W	D	L	GF	GA	GD	W	D	L	GF	GA	GD
38	15	14	9	42	34	+8	59	11	5	3	26	13	+13	4	9	6	16	21	−5

Source: La Liga

==== Results by round ====
Round	1	2	3	4	5	6	7	8	9	10	11	12	13	14	15	16	17	18	19	20	21	22	23	24	25	26	27	28	29	30	31	32	33	34	35	36	37	38
Ground	A	H	H	A	H	A	H	A	H	A	H	A	H	A	H	A	H	A	H	H	A	A	H	A	H	A	H	A	H	A	H	A	H	A	H	A	H	A
Result	L	W	W	W	W	D	W	L	D	L	L	D	W	W	W	D	W	L	L	D	D	D	W	D	D	W	W	D	W	D	D	D	D	L	W	W	L	L
Position	11	9	5	2	1	2	1	3	3	6	6	7	5	3	2	4	2	4	6	8	8	7	6	7	6	5	3	5	3	4	5	5	6	6	6	6	6	6

Source: La Liga
A = Away; H = Home; W = Win; D = Draw; L = Loss

==== Matches ====
26 August 2001 1	Málaga	3–2	Real Betis	Málga

9 September 2001 2	Real Betis	2–0	Espanyol	Seville

15 September 2001 3	Real Betis	3–1	Real Madrid	Seville

23 September 2001 4	Valladolid	0–2	Real Betis	Valladolid

30 September 2001 5	Real Betis	1–0	Las Palmas	Seville

3 October 2001 6	Athletic Bilbao	0–0	Real Betis	Bilbao

7 October 2001 7	Real Betis	1–0	Alavés	Seville

14 October 2001 8	Celta Vigo	3–1	Real Betis	Vigo

20 October 2001 9	Real Betis	1–1	Villarreal	Seville

27 October 2001 10	Barcelona	3–0	Real Betis	Barcelona

4 November 2001 11	Real Betis	0–1	Zaragoza	Seville

10 November 2001 12	Sevilla	0–0	Real Betis	Seville

18 November 2001 13	Real Betis	2–0	Rayo Vallecano	Seville

25 November 2001 14	Osasuna	1–2	Real Betis	Pamplona

2 December 2001 15	Real Betis	1–0	Tenerife	Seville

9 December 2001 16	Real Sociedad	0–0	Real Betis	San Sebastián

16 December 2001 17	Real Betis	1–0	Mallorca	Seville

22 December 2001 18	Deportivo La Coruña	2–0	Real Betis	A Coruña

6 January 2002 19	Real Betis	1–3	Valencia	Seville

13 January 2002 20	Real Betis	1–1	Málaga	Seville

20 January 2002 21	Espanyol	1–1	Real Betis	Barcelona

27 January 2002 22	Real Madrid	1–1	Real Betis	Madrid

3 February 2002 23	Real Betis	2–0	Valladolid	Seville

6 February 2002 24	Las Palmas	0–0	Real Betis	Las Palmas

10 February 2002 25	Real Betis	1–1	Athletic Bilbao	Seville

17 February 2002 26	Alavés	0–1	Real Betis	Vitoria-Gasteiz

24 February 2002 27	Real Betis	4–1	Celta Vigo	Seville

2 March 2002 28	Villarreal	1–1	Real Betis	Villarreal

9 March 2002 29	Real Betis	2–1	Barcelona	Seville

17 March 2002 30	Zaragoza	1–1	Real Betis	Zaragoza

23 March 2002 31	Real Betis	0–0	Sevilla	Seville

31 March 2002 32	Rayo Vallecano	0–0	Real Betis	Madrid

7 April 2002 33	Real Betis	0–0	Osasuna	Seville

14 April 2002 34	Tenerife	2–1	Real Betis	Santa Cruz de Tenerife

21 April 2002 35	Real Betis	3–0	Real Sociedad	Seville

28 April 2002 36	Mallorca	1–3	Real Betis	Palma

5 May 2002 37	Real Betis	0–3	Deportivo La Coruña	Seville

11 May 2002 38	Valencia	2–0	Real Betis	Valencia

=== Copa del Rey ===
10 October 2001 Round of 64	Ceuta	4–1	Real Betis	Ceuta
