= 2016 2. deild karla =

2. deild karla
- Season: 2016
- Champions: ÍR
- Promoted: ÍR; Grótta
- Relegated: Ægir; KF
- Matches: 132
- Goals: 404 (3.06 per match)
- Top goalscorer: Jón Gísli Ström (ÍR) (22 goals)
- Biggest home win: Sindri 5–0 Njarðvík (25 June 2016); ÍR 5–0 Höttur (10 August 2016); Afturelding 7–2 Höttur (17 September 2016)
- Biggest away win: KV 0–4 Vestri (10 August 2016)
- Highest scoring: Afturelding 7–2 Höttur (17 September 2016)

The 2016 2. deild karla (English: Men's Second Division) was the 51st season of third-tier football in Iceland. Twelve teams contest the league. Play began on 6 May and concluded on 24 September.

== Teams ==
The league is contested by twelve clubs, eight of which played in the division during the 2015 season. There were four new clubs from the previous campaign:

- Grótta and Vestri were relegated from the 2015 1. deild karla, replacing Huginn and Leiknir F. who were promoted to the 2016 1. deild karla
- Magni and Völsungur were promoted from the 2015 3. deild karla, in place of Tindastóll and Dalvík/Reynir who were relegated to the 2016 3. deild karla

=== Club information ===
Location of teams in the 2016 2. deild karla

Team	Location	Stadium	2015 season
Afturelding	Mosfellsbær	N1-völlurinn Varmá	6th
Grótta	Seltjarnarnes	Vivaldivöllurinn	11th in 1. deild
Höttur	Egilsstaðir	Vilhjálmsvöllur	5th
ÍR	Reykjavík	Hertz völlurinn	3rd
KF	Fjallabyggð	Ólafsfjarðarvöllur	7th
KV	Reykjavík	KR-völlur	4th
Magni	Grenivík	Grenivíkurvöllur	1st in 3. deild
Njarðvík	Njarðvík	Njarðtaksvöllurinn	10th
Sindri	Höfn	Sindravellir	8th
Vestri	Ísafjörður	Torfnesvöllur	12th in 1. deild
Völsungur	Húsavík	Húsavíkurvöllur	2nd in 3. deild
Ægir	Þorlákshöfn	Þorlákshafnarvöllur	9th

== League table ==
Pos	Team	Pld	W	D	L	GF	GA	GD	Pts	Promotion or relegation
1	ÍR (C, P)	22	17	3	2	47	19	+28	54	Promotion to the 2017 1. deild karla
2	Grótta (P)	22	12	7	3	34	16	+18	43	Promotion to the 2017 1. deild karla
3	Afturelding	22	12	5	5	45	26	+19	41	
4	Sindri	22	9	5	8	41	29	+12	32	
5	Magni	22	8	7	7	36	32	+4	31	
6	Vestri	22	8	5	9	41	40	+1	29	
7	Höttur	22	7	6	9	31	39	−8	27	
8	Njarðvík	22	6	7	9	29	31	−2	25	
9	Völsungur	22	4	12	6	29	37	−8	24	
10	KV	22	6	3	13	31	43	−12	21	
11	Ægir (R)	22	6	3	13	26	45	−19	21	Relegation to the 2017 3. deild karla
12	KF (R)	22	2	7	13	14	47	−33	13	Relegation to the 2017 3. deild karla

Updated to match(es) played on 27 March 2017. Source:
Rules for classification: 1) points; 2) goal difference; 3) number of goals scored.
(C) Champions; (P) Promoted; (R) Relegated

== Results ==
Each team plays every opponent once home and away for a total of 22 matches per club, and 132 matches altogether.

Home \ Away	AFT	GRÓ	HÖT	ÍR	KF	KV	MAG	NJA	SIH	VES	VÖL	ÆGR
Afturelding		1–1	7–2	0–2	4–0	4–1	2–0	0–0	2–0	1–2	3–0	3–2
Grótta	2–2		2–1	0–2	1–1	0–3	3–0	2–1	0–0	4–0	4–0	3–0
Höttur	2–1	2–1		1–1	5–1	3–2	2–1	0–1	2–3	3–2	1–1	2–2
Íþróttafélag Reykjavíkur	3–1	0–2	5–0		4–1	2–0	2–2	1–0	3–0	2–1	2–1	4–3
Knattspyrnufélag Fjallabyggðar	0–2	0–0	0–0	2–3		1–0	0–0	1–0	0–3	2–3	1–1	1–1
Knattspyrnufélag Vesturbæjar	1–3	1–2	1–0	1–2	3–0		1–2	0–3	0–2	0–4	3–1	4–1
Magni	2–0	0–2	0–1	1–0	5–1	3–3		2–1	1–0	5–2	1–1	5–2
Njarðvík	0–1	1–2	2–2	0–1	1–1	2–2	2–2		0–1	2–1	2–2	4–1
Sindri	2–2	1–2	0–0	2–3	4–0	6–2	1–1	5–0		3–1	2–2	1–2
Íþróttafélagið Vestri	3–3	0–0	2–0	0–1	3–0	1–3	4–2	2–3	3–1		2–2	2–0
Völsungur	1–2	0–0	2–1	1–1	3–1	0–0	1–1	1–1	3–2	2–2		4–2
Ægir	0–1	0–1	2–1	0–3	1–0	1–0	1–0	1–3	0–2	1–1	3–0	

Updated to match(es) played on 27 March 2017. Source:
Legend: Blue = home team win; Yellow = draw; Red = away team win.
