= 2017 2. deild karla =

2. deild karla
- Season: 2017
- Champions: Njarðvík
- Promoted: Njarðvík; Magni
- Relegated: KV; Sindri
- Matches played: 132
- Goals scored: 520 (3.94 per match)
- Top goalscorer: Sæþór Olgeirsson (23 goals)
- Biggest home win: Huginn 5–0 Fjarðabyggð (29 June 2017); Tindastóll 6–1 Höttur (19 August 2017)
- Biggest away win: Fjarðabyggð 2–7 Njarðvík (27 May 2017); Sindri 0–5 Vestri (6 June 2017)
- Highest scoring: Víðir 6–5 Magni (23 September 2017)
- All statistics correct as of 23 September 2017.

The Icelandic men's second division 2017 football season was the 52nd season of third-tier football in Iceland. Twelve teams contested the league. Play began on 6 May and concluded on 23 September.

== Teams ==
The league was contested by twelve clubs, eight of which played in the division during the 2016 season. There were four new clubs from the previous campaign:

- Huginn and Fjarðabyggð were relegated from the 2016 1. deild karla, replacing ÍR and Grótta who were promoted to the 2017 1. deild karla
- Tindastóll and Víðir were promoted from the 2016 3. deild karla, in place of Ægir and KF who were relegated to the 2017 3. deild karla

=== Club information ===
Location of teams in the 2017 2. deild karla

Team	Location	Stadium	2016 season
Afturelding	Mosfellsbær	Varmárvöllur	3rd
Fjarðabyggð	Reyðarfjörður	Fjarðabyggðarhöllin	12th in 1. deild
Huginn	Seyðisfjörður	Seyðisfjarðarvöllur	11th in 1. deild
Höttur	Egilsstaðir	Vilhjálmsvöllur	7th
KV	Reykjavík	KR-völlur	10th
Magni	Grenivík	Grenivíkurvöllur	5th
Njarðvík	Njarðvík	Njarðtaksvöllurinn	8th
Sindri	Höfn	Sindravellir	4th
Tindastóll	Sauðárkrókur	Sauðárkróksvöllur	1st in 3. deild
Vestri	Ísafjörður	Torfnesvöllur	6th
Víðir	Garður	Nesfisk-völlurinn	2nd in 3. deild
Völsungur	Húsavík	Húsavíkurvöllur	9th

== League table ==
Pos	Team	Pld	W	D	L	GF	GA	GD	Pts	Promotion or relegation
1	Njarðvík (C, P)	22	15	5	2	51	29	+22	50	Promotion to the 2018 1. deild karla
2	Magni (P)	22	11	6	5	52	41	+11	39	Promotion to the 2018 1. deild karla
3	Víðir	22	11	4	7	51	45	+6	37	
4	Afturelding	22	10	4	8	50	37	+13	34	
5	Huginn	22	9	7	6	41	28	+13	34	
6	Tindastóll	22	10	4	8	47	42	+5	34	
7	Völsungur	22	9	3	10	55	47	+8	30	
8	Fjarðabyggð	22	8	4	10	28	41	−13	28	
9	Vestri	22	8	3	11	34	35	−1	27	
10	Höttur	22	7	5	10	39	54	−15	26	
11	KV (R)	22	6	3	13	37	57	−20	21	Relegation to the 2018 3. deild karla
12	Sindri (R)	22	1	6	15	35	64	−29	9	Relegation to the 2018 3. deild karla

Updated to match(es) played on 23 September 2017. Source:
Rules for classification: 1) points; 2) goal difference; 3) number of goals scored.
(C) Champions; (P) Promoted; (R) Relegated

== Results ==
Each team plays every opponent once home and away for a total of 22 matches per club, and 132 matches altogether.

Home \ Away	AFT	KFF	HUG	HÖT	KV	MAG	NJA	SIH	TIN	VES	VIÐ	VÖL
Afturelding		0–1	3–2	6–2	1–2	3–4	1–1	2–2	5–1	1–0	5–1	3–1
Fjarðabyggð	1–0		1–0	1–2	3–1	1–1	2–7	4–0	1–1	1–0	2–3	2–2
Huginn	2–2	5–0		3–1	4–1	2–1	1–1	5–1	3–4	1–1	0–1	2–1
Höttur	0–3	1–1	0–0		2–2	3–3	0–2	2–1	1–3	1–0	3–4	4–2
Knattspyrnufélag Vesturbæjar	2–4	2–0	3–1	0–2		1–3	4–6	2–1	1–2	1–0	0–3	2–3
Magni	2–1	3–0	4–3	5–3	4–1		0–1	2–1	1–2	1–3	2–1	2–2
Njarðvík	1–0	2–1	0–0	0–3	3–1	1–1		2–2	2–0	3–1	1–3	3–2
Sindri	0–3	1–2	3–4	1–1	4–4	2–2	1–2		2–2	0–5	3–5	2–4
Tindastóll	2–3	2–3	0–1	6–1	5–3	1–2	1–3	2–0		2–1	4–2	4–3
Íþróttafélagið Vestri	4–2	1–0	0–0	3–4	1–2	2–1	2–4	0–3	2–2		3–1	3–2
Víðir	1–1	2–1	0–1	4–1	2–2	6–5	2–3	4–2	0–0	1–2		2–1
Völsungur	5–1	5–0	0–2	4–2	3–0	2–3	1–3	5–3	2–1	2–0	3–3	

Updated to match(es) played on 23 September 2017. Source:
Legend: Blue = home team win; Yellow = draw; Red = away team win.

== Top goalscorers ==
As of matches played on 23 September 2017.

Rank	Player	Club	Goals
1	(Iceland) Sæþór Olgeirsson	Völsungur	23
2	(Iceland) Kristinn Þór Rósbergsson	Magni	16
2	(Spain) Gonzalo Zamorano Leon	Huginn	16
4	(Iceland) Ágúst Leó Björnsson	Afturelding	13
4	(Spain) Ignacio Gonzalez Martinez	Höttur	13
4	(Scotland) Kenneth Hogg	Njarðvík	13
7	(Iceland) Lars Óli Jessen	Magni	10
7	(Iceland) Ragnar Þór Gunnarsson	Tindastóll	10
9	(Iceland) Helgi Þór Jónsson	Víðir	9
9	(Iceland) Andri Fannar Freysson	Njarðvík	9
9	(Iceland) Patrik Snær Atlason	Víðir	9
