= Tobias Thomsen =

Danish footballer (born 1992)

Personal information
- Date of birth: 19 October 1992 (age 34)
- Height: 1.83 m (6 ft 0 in)
- Position: Forward

Team information
- Current team: HB Køge
- Number: 9

Youth career
- –2011: HB Køge

Senior career*
Years	Team	Apps	(Gls)
2011–2012	HB Køge	12	(2)
2012–2013	Nykøbing		
2013–2015	Næstved		
2015–2017	AB	20	(6)
2017	KR	22	(9)
2018	Valur	14	(1)
2019–2020	KR	27	(8)
2020–2024	Hvidovre	111	(36)
2024–2025	Torreense	13	(3)
2025	Breiðablik	25	(10)
2026–	HB Køge	14	(8)
- * Club domestic league appearances and goals as of 2 June 2026

Tobias Thomsen (born 19 October 1992) is a Danish professional footballer who plays as a forward for HB Køge.

== Club career ==
He made his Danish Superliga debut for HB Køge on 25 July 2011 in a game against FC Midtjylland.
