= 2016 Úrvalsdeild =

Úrvalsdeild (Pepsi-deildin)
- Season: 2016
- Dates: 1 May – 1 October 2016
- Champions: FH (8th title)
- Relegated: Fylkir; Þróttur Reykjavík
- Champions League: FH
- Europa League: Stjarnan; KR; Valur
- Matches: 132
- Goals: 361 (2.73 per match)
- Top goalscorer: Garðar Gunnlaugsson (14 goals)
- Biggest home win: Valur 7–0 Víkingur Reykjavík (18 August 2016)
- Biggest away win: Þróttur Reykjavík 0–5 Fjölnir (24 June 2016)
- Highest scoring: Valur 7–0 Víkingur Reykjavík (18 August 2016)

The 2016 Úrvalsdeild karla, also known as Pepsi-deild karla for sponsorship reasons, was the 105th season of top-flight Icelandic football. Twelve teams contested the league, including the defending champions FH, who won their seventh league title in 2015.

The season started on 1 May 2016 and concluded on 1 October 2016.

On 19 September 2016, Breiðablik drew 1–1 with ÍBV. This result meant FH clinched their 8th Icelandic title.

== Teams ==
Location of teams in the 2016 Úrvalsdeild

The 2016 Úrvalsdeild was contested by twelve clubs, ten of which played in the division the previous year and two teams promoted from 1. deild karla. The changes from the 2015 campaign were:

- Leiknir Reykjavík and Keflavík were relegated from the 2015 Úrvalsdeild to the 1. deild karla.
- Víkingur Ólafsvík and Þróttur Reykjavík were promoted from the 1. deild karla to the 2016 Úrvalsdeild.

=== Club information ===
Team	Location	Stadium	2015 season
Breiðablik	Kópavogur	Kópavogsvöllur	2nd
FH	Hafnarfjörður	Kaplakrikavöllur	1st (champions)
Fjölnir	Reykjavík	Fjölnisvöllur	6th
Fylkir	Reykjavík	Fylkisvöllur	8th
ÍA	Akranes	Akranesvöllur	7th
ÍBV	Vestmannaeyjar	Hásteinsvöllur	10th
KR	Reykjavík	KR-völlur	3rd
Stjarnan	Garðabær	Stjörnuvöllur	4th
Valur	Reykjavík	Hlíðarendi	5th
Víkingur Reykjavík	Reykjavík	Víkin	9th
Víkingur Ólafsvík	Ólafsvík	Ólafsvíkurvöllur	1st, 1. deild karla
Þróttur Reykjavík	Reykjavík	Valbjarnarvöllur	2nd, 1. deild karla

== League table ==
Pos	Team	Pld	W	D	L	GF	GA	GD	Pts	Qualification or relegation
1	FH (C)	22	12	7	3	32	17	+15	43	Qualification for the Champions League second qualifying round
2	Stjarnan	22	12	3	7	43	31	+12	39	Qualification for the Europa League first qualifying round
3	KR	22	11	5	6	29	20	+9	38	Qualification for the Europa League first qualifying round
4	Fjölnir	22	11	4	7	42	25	+17	37	
5	Valur	22	10	5	7	41	28	+13	35	Qualification for the Europa League first qualifying round (Note: Valur qualified for the Europa League first qualifying round by winning the 2016 Icelandic Cup.)
6	Breiðablik	22	10	5	7	27	20	+7	35	
7	Víkingur Reykjavík	22	9	5	8	29	32	−3	32	
8	ÍA	22	10	1	11	28	33	−5	31	
9	ÍBV	22	6	5	11	23	27	−4	23	
10	Víkingur Ólafsvík	22	5	6	11	23	38	−15	21	
11	Fylkir (R)	22	4	7	11	25	40	−15	19	Relegation to 1. deild karla
12	Þróttur Reykjavík (R)	22	3	5	14	19	50	−31	14	Relegation to 1. deild karla

Source: KSÍ (in Icelandic), Soccerway
Rules for classification: 1) Points; 2) Goal difference; 3) Goals scored; 4) Head-to-head points; 5) Head-to-head goal difference; 6) Head-to-head goals scored; 7) Head-to-head away goals scored; 8) Play-off (only for deciding champion); 9) Draw.
(C) Champions; (R) Relegated

== Results ==
Home \ Away	BRE	FH	FJÖ	FYL	ÍA	ÍBV	KR	STJ	VAL	VÍK	VÓL	ÞRÓ
Breiðablik		0–1	0–3	1–1	0–1	1–1	1–0	2–1	0–0	1–0	1–2	2–0
FH	1–1		2–0	1–0	2–1	1–1	0–1	3–2	1–1	2–2	1–1	2–0
Fjölnir	0–3	0–1		1–1	4–0	2–0	3–1	0–1	2–2	2–1	5–1	2–0
Fylkir	1–2	2–3	2–2		0–3	0–3	1–4	1–2	2–2	1–0	2–1	2–2
ÍA	1–0	1–3	1–0	1–1		2–0	0–1	4–2	2–1	2–0	3–0	0–1
ÍBV	0–2	1–1	0–2	1–2	4–0		1–0	1–2	4–0	0–3	1–1	1–1
KR	1–1	1–0	3–2	3–0	1–2	2–0		1–1	2–1	0–0	0–0	2–1
Stjarnan	1–3	1–1	2–1	2–0	3–1	1–0	1–3		2–3	3–0	4–1	6–0
Valur	0–3	0–1	1–2	2–0	1–0	2–1	2–0	2–0		7–0	3–1	4–1
Víkingur Reykjavík	3–1	1–0	1–2	2–2	3–2	2–1	1–0	1–2	2–2		2–0	2–0
Víkingur Ólafsvík	0–2	0–2	2–2	1–0	3–0	0–1	0–1	2–3	2–1	1–1		3–2
Þróttur Reykjavík	2–0	0–3	0–5	1–4	3–1	0–1	2–2	1–1	0–4	1–2	1–1	

Source: KSI (in Icelandic)
Legend: Blue = home team win; Yellow = draw; Red = away team win.

== Season statistics ==
=== Top scorers ===
As of matches played on 1 October 2016.

Rank	Player	Club	Goals
1	(Iceland) Garðar Gunnlaugsson	ÍA	14
2	(Iceland) Kristinn Freyr Sigurðsson	Valur	13
3	(Denmark) Martin Lund Pedersen	Fjölnir	9
4	(Croatia) Hrvoje Tokić	Víkingur Ó.	9
5	(Iceland) Óskar Örn Hauksson	KR	8
6	(Iceland) Atli Viðar Björnsson	FH	7
7	(Iceland) Thórir Gudjónsson	Fjölnir	7
8	(Iceland) Hilmar Árni Halldórsson	Stjarnan	7
9	(Iceland) Albert Brynjar Ingason	Fylkir	7
10	(Iceland) Óttar Magnús Karlsson	Víkingur R.	7
