= Knattspyrnufélagið Berserkir =

Berserkir
- Full name: Knattspyrnufélagið Berserkir
- Founded: 16 January 2007
- Ground: Víkingsvöllur
- Capacity: 1,449 (1,149 seated)
- 2023: 5. deild karla Group B, 5th of 9

Knattspyrnufélagið Berserkir (Icelandic pronunciation: [ˈkʰnahtˌspɪ(r)tnʏˌfjɛːˌlaijɪð ˈpɛrsɛr̥cɪr̥], lit. 'Berserkers Football Club' (Note: Knattspyrnufélagið is the definite form of Knattspyrnufélag, meaning "the football club".)) is an Icelandic football club located in Reykjavík. The club was founded on 16 January 2007 and is affiliated with Knattspyrnufélagið Víkingur.
