= Íþróttafélagið Vestri =

Icelandic sports club

Vestri
- Full name: Íþróttafélagið Vestri
- Nickname: Djúpmenn
- Founded: 16 January 2016 (10 years ago)
- Chairman: Guðfinna Hreiðarsdóttir

Íþróttafélagið Vestri (Icelandic pronunciation: [ˈiːˌθrouhtaˌfjɛːˌlaijɪð ˈvɛstrɪ], lit. 'Vestri Sports Club' (Note: Íþróttafélagið is the definite form of Íþróttafélag, meaning "the sports club".)), known as Vestri, is an Icelandic multi-sports club based in northern Westfjords. The club was formed in 2016 from the merger of KFÍ (basketball), Skellur (volleyball), Sundfélagið Vestri (swim) and BÍ/Bolungarvík (football).

== Basketball ==
Vestri's basketball was founded in 1965 as Körfuknattleiksfélag Ísafjarðar or KFÍ for short. Its men's team has played several seasons in the top-tier Úrvalsdeild karla, with their best season coming in 1998–1999 when it finished 3rd and made it to the semi-finals of the playoffs. Its women's team played in the top-tier Úrvalsdeild kvenna from 1999 to 2002, making the playoffs in 2001.

== Football ==
The team was founded in 1986 as the football department of Badmintonfélag Ísafjarðar, or BÍ for short. After the folding of ÍBÍ's football department in 1988 after years of financial difficulties, BÍ became the main football team in Ísafjörður under the name Boltafélag Ísafjarðar. Its women's team played in the top-tier women's league that same year. From 2006 to 2016 the club fielded a joint team with Ungmennafélag Bolungarvíkur, called BÍ/Bolungarvík. In 2016 the club merged into Íþróttafélagið Vestri along with Skellur (Volleyball), Sundfélagið Vestri (Swim) and KFÍ (Basketball), becoming its football department. In 2025, it won its first major trophy when the men's team defeated heavy favorites Valur 1-0 in the Icelandic Cup final.

== Volleyball ==
=== Men's volleyball ===
==== History ====
In 2019, the men's team was promoted to the top-tier Mizuno League for the first time in its history. In March 2023, the team advanced to the Icelandic Cup final for the first time.

==== Titles ====
- Division I (2):
  - 2017, 2019

=== Women's volleyball ===
==== Titles ====
- Division II (1):
  - 2015 (as Skellur)
