= Þórsvöllur =

Football stadium in Iceland

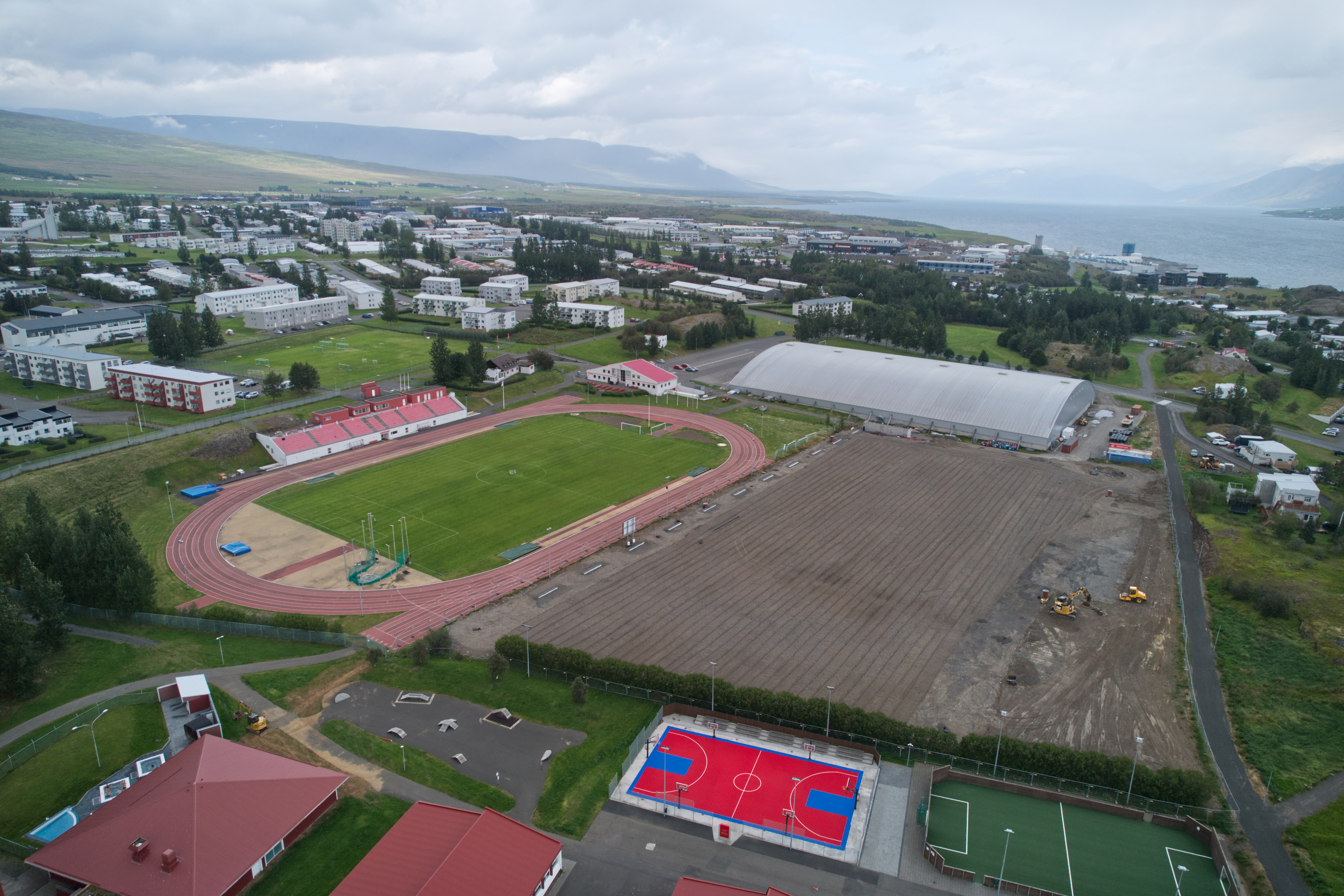
- Interactive map of Þórsvöllur
- Location: Traðarland; Akureyri, Iceland
- Coordinates: 65°41′29″N 18°7′4″W
- Capacity: 2,984 (984 seated)
- Surface: Artificial

Construction
- Opened: 2007

Tenants
- Þór; Þór/KA

Þórsvöllur (Icelandic pronunciation: [ˈθour̥sˌvœtlʏr̥], lit. 'Þór Field' or more precisely 'Þór Stadium') is a football stadium in Iceland. It is located in Akureyri, and seats 984 individuals in one stand but the field can hold 2,000 standing spectators additionally. It is the home stadium for Icelandic football team Þór.
