= Ungmennafélagið Leiknir =

Leiknir F.
- Full name: Ungmennafélagið Leiknir
- Founded: 1940; 86 years ago
- Ground: Búðagrund Fáskrúðsfjörður (backup ground: Fjarðabyggðarhöllin; Reyðarfjörður)
- Capacity: 400
- Manager: Vidar Jónsson
- League: 2. deild karla
- 2021: 10th of 12th
Home colours	Away colours

Ungmennafélagið Leiknir (Icelandic pronunciation: [ˈuŋkˌmɛnːaˌfjɛːˌlaijɪð ˈleikˌnɪr̥], lit. 'Leiknir Youth Club' (Note: Ungmennafélagið is the definite form of Ungmennafélag, meaning "the youth club".)), commonly referred to as Leiknir Fáskrúðsfjörður ([ˈleikˌnɪr̥ ˈfauːˌskruðsˌfjœrðʏr̥]) to differentiate them from the Reykjavík club also called Leiknir, is an Icelandic multi-sports club from Fáskrúðsfjörður. The club was founded in 1940.

== History ==
Their football team last played in 2. deild karla, the third level of Icelandic football.

In 2015 the club placed 2nd in the 2. deild karla and won promotion to the 1. deild karla. After magically avoiding relegation on goal difference from the 1. deild karla with a 7–2 win against HK in the final round of the season, the team was relegated back to the 2. deild karla in 2017.

=== Austfjarða ===
In 2022, the football division of the club merged with Fjarðabyggð to establish the new Knattspyrnufélag Austfjarða.
