= 2018–19 Copa Catalunya basketball season =

Spanish basketball league season

Copa Catalunya
- Season: 2018–19
- Duration: 29 September 2018 - 2 June 2019
- Teams: 28
- TV partner(s): La Xarxa

Regular season
- Top seed: CB Lliçà d'Amunt; Badalonès-Fruits Secs Corbera
- Relegated: Vedruna Gràcia; CB Cantaires Tortosa; Outletmoto.com CB Grup Barna; Bàsquet Molins; CB Ciutat Vella
- All statistics correct as of complete.

The 2018–19 Copa Catalunya season, is the 20th season of Copa Catalunya.

The All Star Game was played at Pavelló Nou Congost in Manresa.

== Format ==
=== Regular season ===
28 teams are divided in two groups. The first round was on September 29, 2018.

=== Final stage ===
The Final Stage will be played in play-off ties in a two-legged format, with the exception of the final four.

=== Relegation PlayOffs ===
In the relegation playoffs, teams played against each other must win two games to win the series. The winners remain at Copa Catalunya for the next season.

== Teams ==
=== Promotion and relegation (pre-season) ===
A total of 28 teams contest the league, including 18 sides from the 2017–18 season, three relegated from the 2017–18 EBA and seven promoted from the 2017–18 CC 1ªCategoria. On July 14, 2018, CB Salt achieved a vacant on Liga EBA.

Teams relegated from Liga EBA

- ~~CB Salt~~
- Camping Bianya Roser
- CB Cantaires Tortosa
- CB Cerdanyola al Dia

Teams promoted from CC 1ªCategoria

- Lluïsos de Gràcia
- Grupo Marthe UE Mataró B
- CB Ripollet-Aíbaba Restaurant
- A.E.S.E.
- CB Castellar
- UE Horta
- ~~Sant Gervasi~~
- Sol Gironès Bisbal Bàsquet

=== Venues and locations ===
Team	Home city	Arena	Group
Camping Bianya Roser	Barcelona	Poliesportiu Estacio del Nord	1
CB Artés	Artés	Pavelló Esportiu d'Artés	1
CB Cerdanyola al Dia	Cerdanyola del Vallès	Parc Esportiu Guiera	1
CB Granollers	Granollers	Pavelló CB Granollers	1
CB Lliçà d'Amunt	Lliçà d'Amunt	Pavelló d'Esports Lliçà d'Amunt	1
CB Ciutat Vella	Barcelona	CEM Parc de la Ciutadella	1
CEB Girona	Girona	Pavelló Ramon Sitja	1
Grupo Marthe UE Mataró B	Mataró	Palau d'Esports Josep Mora	1
Lluïsos de Gràcia	Barcelona	Pavelló Josep Comellas	1
Outletmoto.com-CB Grup Barna	Barcelona	Nau Parc Clot	1
Recanvis Gaudí CB Mollet B	Mollet del Valles	Pavelló Plana Lledo	1
Sol Gironès Bisbal Bàsquet	La Bisbal d'Empordà	Pavelló de la Bisbal d'Empordà	1
Vedruna Gràcia	Barcelona	Poliesportiu Josep Maria de Segarra	1
UE Horta	Barcelona	U.E. Horta	1
100 Anys Ploms Salle Reus	Reus	Pavelló Joan Sirolla	2
A.E.S.E.	L'Hospitalet de Llobregat	Poliesportiu Santa Eulalia	2
Badalonès-Fruits Secs Corbera	Badalona	Pavelló La Plana	2
BasquetPiaSabadell	Sabadell	Escola Pia Sabadell	2
Bàsquet Molins	Molins de Rei	Pavelló Molins de Rei	2
Bàsquet Sitges	Sitges	Pavelló Poliesportiu Pins Vens	2
CB Alpicat	Alpicat	Pavelló Antoni Roure d'Alpicat	2
CB Cantaires Tortosa	Tortosa	Pavelló de Ferreries	2
CB Castellar	Castellar del Vallès	Nou Pavelló Zona Puigverd	2
CB Ripollet-Aíbaba Restaurant	Ripollet	Nou Pavelló Francesc Barneda	2
CB Santa Coloma	Santa Coloma de Gramenet	Pavelló Joan del Moral	2
Círcol Cotonifici Badalona	Badalona	Pavelló La Plana	2
Maristes Ademar	Badalona	Pavelló La Plana	2
UE Sant Cugat	Sant Cugat del Vallés	Pavelló Sant Cugat	2

== Regular season ==
=== Group 1 ===
Pos	Team	Pld	W	L	PF	PA	PD	Pts	Qualification or relegation
1	CB Lliçà d'Amunt	26	20	6	1974	1775	+199	46	Qualification to Final Stage
2	Camping Bianya Roser (P)	26	19	7	1910	1684	+226	45	Qualification to Final Stage
3	Lluïsos de Gràcia	26	18	8	1696	1605	+91	44	Qualification to Final Stage
4	Sol Gironès Bisbal Bàsquet	26	18	8	1835	1742	+93	44	Qualification to Final Stage
5	CEB Girona	26	17	9	1953	1783	+170	43	
6	CB Artés	26	16	10	1970	1861	+109	42	
7	Recanvis Gaudí CB Mollet B	26	16	10	2079	2002	+77	42	
8	CB Granollers	26	12	14	1954	1855	+99	38	
9	CB Cerdanyola al Dia	26	12	14	1867	1944	−77	38	
10	Temple-UE Horta (O)	26	9	17	1614	1769	−155	35	Qualification to Relegation Playoffs
11	CB Ciutat Vella (R)	26	8	18	1976	2080	−104	34	Qualification to Relegation Playoffs
12	Outletmoto.com CB Grup Barna (R)	26	8	18	1772	1952	−180	34	Qualification to Relegation Playoffs
13	Grupo Marthe UE Mataro B (R)	26	8	18	1757	1791	−34	34	Qualification to Relegation Playoffs
14	Vedruna Gràcia (R)	26	1	25	1546	2060	−514	27	Relegation to CC 1ª Categoria

Updated to match(es) played on 12 May 2019. Source: BasquetCatala
(O) Play-off winners; (P) Promoted; (R) Relegated

=== Group 2 ===
Pos	Team	Pld	W	L	PF	PA	PD	Pts	Qualification or relegation
1	Badalonès-Fruits Secs Corbera (P)	26	20	6	1973	1717	+256	46	Qualification to Final Stage
2	CB Ripollet-Aíbaba Restaurant	26	20	6	2164	1968	+196	46	Qualification to Final Stage
3	CB Alpicat	26	19	7	1951	1789	+162	45	Qualification to Final Stage
4	Maristes Ademar (C, P)	26	16	10	1871	1786	+85	42	Qualification to Final Stage
5	Bàsquet Sitges	26	15	11	1898	1836	+62	41	
6	CB Santa Coloma	26	15	11	1880	1812	+68	41	
7	100 Anys Ploms Salle Reus	26	13	13	1781	1813	−32	39	
8	A.E.S.E.	26	12	14	1692	1709	−17	38	
9	BasquetPiaSabadell	26	12	14	1880	1883	−3	38	
10	CB Castellar (O)	26	10	16	1988	1975	+13	36	Qualification to Relegation Playoffs
11	UE Sant Cugat (O)	26	9	17	1813	1902	−89	35	Qualification to Relegation Playoffs
12	Círcol Cotonifici Badalona (O)	26	8	18	1736	1969	−233	34	Qualification to Relegation Playoffs
13	Bàsquet Molins (R)	26	8	18	1700	1871	−171	34	Qualification to Relegation Playoffs
14	CB Cantaires Tortosa (R)	26	5	21	1785	2082	−297	31	Relegation to CC 1ª Categoria

Updated to match(es) played on 12 May 2019. Source: BasquetCatala
(C) Champions; (O) Play-off winners; (P) Promoted; (R) Relegated

== Relegation PlayOffs ==
The first legs were played on 19 May 2019, the second legs on 26 May 2019 and the third legs, if necessary, on 2 June 2019.

Team 1	Series	Team 2	Game 1	Game 2	Game 3
Temple-UE Horta	2-0	Bàsquet Molins	71-57	63-57	
UE Sant Cugat	2-0	Outletmoto.com CB Grup Barna	83-69	75-74	
CB Ciutat Vella	0-2	Círcol Cotonifici Badalona	88-96	71-81	
CB Castellar	2-1	Grupo Marthe UE Mataro B	73-60	72-84	69-68

== Final round ==
=== Quarter-finals ===
The first legs will be played on 18–19 May 2019, and the second legs will be played on 25–26 May 2019.

Team 1	Agg.	Team 2	1st leg	2nd leg
Sol Gironès Bisbal Bàsquet	144-157	Badalonès-Fruits Secs Corbera	81-82	63-75
Lluïsos de Gràcia	133-128	CB Ripollet-Aíbaba Restaurant	51-57	82-71
CB Alpicat	129-149	Camping Bianya Roser	66-71	63-78
Maristes Ademar	140-129	CB Lliçà d'Amunt	66-64	74-65

=== Final Four ===
Games played at Pavelló Jaume Vilamajó in Calafell

Semifinals; 1 June
Lluïsos de Gràcia	51
Maristes Ademar	59
Camping Bianya Roser	73
Badalonès-Fruits Secs Corbera	76

Final; 2 June
Maristes Ademar	69
Badalonès-Fruits Secs Corbera	58
Third place
Lluïsos de Gràcia	49
Camping Bianya Roser	54

== Awards ==
=== Most Scorer of the Round ===
==== Regular season ====
Round	Player	Team	Points	Ref.
1	Ramon Espuña	CB Lliçà d'Amunt	26	
2	Xavier Costa	100 Anys Ploms Salle Reus	31	
3	Roger Franch	Maristes Ademar	29	
3	Jordi de Ugarte	Basquet Molins	29	
4	Toni Espinosa	CEB Girona	29	
5	Roger Vilanova	CB Ripollet-Aíbaba Restaurant	32	
6	Toni Espinosa (2)	CEB Girona	27	
6	Albert Ortega	CB Ripollet-Aíbaba Restaurant	27	
7	Jonathan Seidi	Recanvis Gaudi CB Mollet B	31	
8	Roger Portella	CB Artés	26	
9	Roger Vilanova (2)	CB Ripollet-Aíbaba Restaurant	30	
10	Pedro Cuesta	Badalonès-Fruits Secs Corbera	27	
11	Isaac Valera	CEB Girona	29	
11	Roger Guardia	Recanvis Gaudí CB Mollet B	29	
12	Jonathan Medina	100 Anys Ploms Salle Reus	35	
13	Roger Vilanova (3)	CB Ripollet-Aíbaba Restaurant	30	
14	Jordi Boronat	Bàsquet Sitges	29	
15	Gonzalo Balta	CB Granollers	31	
16	Roger Portella (2)	CB Artés	26	
17	Roger Vilanova (4)	CB Ripollet-Aíbaba Restaurant	27	
17	David Haro	Bàsquet Sitges	27	
18	Javier Anton	CB Cerdanyola al Dia	29	
19	Pere Ruiz	CB Santa Coloma	28	
20	Roger Vilanova (5)	CB Ripollet-Aíbaba Restaurant	26	
21	Terry Hopewell	Sol Gironès Bisbal Bàsquet	33	
22	Dídac de la Torre	Vedruna Gràcia	31	
23	Roger Vilanova (6)	CB Ripollet-Aíbaba Restaurant	30	
24	Albert Ortega (2)	CB Ripollet-Aíbaba Restaurant	34	
25	Adrià Tort	CB Ciutat Vella	28	
26	Adrià Tort (2)	CB Ciutat Vella	30	

== All Star Game ==
The 2019 Copa Catalunya All-star event will be held on January 26, 2019 at Pavelló Nou Congost in Manresa.

The Black team won the game 94-91. The MVP of the game was Pedro Cuesta who scored 17 points along with 6 rebounds and Guillem Sánchez won the Slam Dunk Contest.

=== Rosters ===
Yellow Team (Group 1)
#	Pos	Player	Team
Starters
1	F	Jordi Serra	UE Mataro B
2	G	Pau Rufaza	CB Mollet B
11	C	Marc Subirachs	CB Grup Barna
24	F	Roger Portella	CB Artés
33	C	Terry Hopewell	Bisbal Bàsquet
Reserves
3	G	Gonzalo Baltà	CB Granollers
7	C	Ramon Espuña	CB Lliçà d'Amunt
9	C	José Bernuz	CB Ciutat Vella
10	F	Toni Espinosa Jr.	CEB Girona
13	G	Genís Tena	CB Cerdanyola
19	C	Pol Martínez	UE Horta
20	F	Albert Martín	Vedruna Gràcia
22	G	Joan Gavaldà	CB Roser
31	F	David Capellas	Lluïsos de Gràcia
Coach: Romà Cutrina (CB Lliçà d'Amunt)
Coach: Carles Rofes (Lluïsos de Gràcia)
Coach: Albert Morejon (CEB Girona)

Black Team (Group 2)
#	Pos	Player	Team
Starters
1	F	Albert Cadafalch	CB Castellar
8	G	Roger Vilanova	CB Ripollet
16	C	Pedro Cuesta	AE Badalonès
23	F	Albert Vallverdú	CB Alpicat
33	C	Dave King	CB Cantaires Tortosa
Reserves
4	F	Eduard Real	A.E.S.E.
5	F	Jordi de Ugarte	Bàsquet Molins
11	G	Alex López	CB Santa Coloma
12	F	Ferran López	UE Sant Cugat
13	G	Joaquim Franch	Maristes Ademar
15	F	Damià Paez	Escola Pia Sabadell
18	C	Xavier Costa	CN Reus Ploms
25	C	Marc Jerez	Círcol Católic de Badalona
32	C	Jordi Boronat	Bàsquet Sitges
Coach: David Igualada (CB Ripollet)
Coach: Xavier Grau (CB Santa Coloma)
Coach: Xavier Riera (AE Badalonès)

=== Game ===
January 26, 2018	Yellow Team	91–94	Black Team	Manresa
18:05	Scoring by quarter: 18-21, 19-25, 21-18, 33-30
La Xarxa	Pts: Gavaldà 14; Rebs: Espuña 9 Asts: Three players 2 PIR: Three players 15	Box Score; Report	Pts: Cuesta 17; Rebs: Cuesta 6 Asts: Vilanova 4 PIR: Cuesta 14	Arena: Pavelló Nou Congost; Attendance: 2.000; Referees: Raul Atienzar, Marian Dimitrov, Francisco Moreno
