= 2017–18 Copa Catalunya basketball season =

Copa Catalunya
- Season: 2017–18
- Duration: 30 September 2017 - 27 May 2018
- Teams: 28
- TV partner(s): La Xarxa

Regular season
- Top seed: Tenea-CB Esparreguera (Group 1); SESE (Group 2)
- Season MVP: Rubén Morales
- Relegated: Club Natació Sabadell; CE Sant Nicolau; Sant Quirze Basquet Club; AD Torreforta; Merchanservis CBS; Basquet SAMA Vilanova

Finals
- Champions: Tenea-CB Esparreguera
- Runners-up: CB Salou
- Third place: SESE
- Fourth place: FC Martinenc Basquet
- All statistics correct as of complete.

The 2017–18 Copa Catalunya season, was the 19th season of Copa Catalunya.

The Final Four was played at the Pavelló Municipal in Salou. Tenea-CB Esparreguera won the title.

The All Star Game was played at Pavelló Nord in Sabadell.

== Format ==
=== Regular season ===
28 teams are divided in two groups. The draw was July 28, 2017.

=== Final Stage ===
The Final Stage will be played in play-off ties in a two-legged format, with the exception of the final four.

=== Relegation PlayOffs ===
In the relegation playoffs, teams played against each other must win two games to win the series. The winners remain at Copa Catalunya for the next season.

== Teams ==
=== Promotion and relegation (pre-season) ===
A total of 28 teams contest the league, including 15 sides from the 2016–17 season, three relegated from the 2016–17 EBA and nine promoted from the 2016–17 CC 1ªCategoria. On July 17, 2017, CB Cerdanyola Al Dia achieved a vacant on Liga EBA. On July 17, 2017, CE Sant Nicolau exchanges a place in the Liga EBA with CB Sant Narcís. On July 18, 2017, CB Cantaires Tortosa achieved a vacant on Liga EBA. Finally Aracena AEC Collblanc-Torrassa B renounces his place in Copa Catalunya.

Teams relegated from Liga EBA

- ~~CB Cerdanyola Al Dia~~
- Outletmoto.com-CB Grup Barna
- Basquet Sitges
- Merchanservis CBS

Teams promoted from CC 1ªCategoria

- FC Martinenc Basquet
- Basquet Molins
- CEB Girona Citylift
- Maristes Ademar Badalona
- Lliça d'Amunt
- Vedruna Gracia
- Circol Cotonifici Badalona
- EsportXTothom-Basquet SAMA Vilanova
- Recanvis Gaudi CB Mollet B

=== Venues and locations ===
| Team | Home city | Arena | Group |
|---|---|---|---|
| AE Badalonès | Badalona | Pavelló La Plana | 1 |
| CB Artés | Artés | Pavelló Esportiu d'Artés | 1 |
| CB Granollers | Granollers | Pavelló CB Granollers | 1 |
| CB Salou | Salou | Pavelló Municipal | 1 |
| Club Natació Sabadell | Sabadell | Pavelló Les Naus | 1 |
| EsportXTothom-Basquet SAMA Vilanova | Vilanova i la Geltrú | CEM Isaac Galvez | 1 |
| FC Martinenc Basquet | Barcelona | Pav. Poliesportiu del Guinardo | 1 |
| Lliça d'Amunt | Lliçà d'Amunt | Pav. d'Esports Lliçà d'Amunt | 1 |
| Maristes Ademar Badalona | Badalona | Pavelló La Plana | 1 |
| Outletmoto.com-CB Grup Barna | Barcelona | Nau Parc Clot | 1 |
| Recanvis Gaudí CB Mollet B | Mollet del Valles | Pavelló Municipal Plana Lledo | 1 |
| Tenea-CB Esparreguera | Esparreguera | Pavelló Ramon Marti | 1 |
| BasquetPiaSabadell | Sabadell | Escola Pia Sabadell | 1 |
| Zamar 2000 Ploms Salle Reus | Reus | Pavelló Joan Sorolla | 1 |
| AD Torreforta | Tarragona | Casal Riu Clar | 2 |
| Bàsquet Molins | Molins de Rei | Pavelló Municipal Molins de Rei | 2 |
| Bàsquet Sitges | Sitges | Pavelló Poliesportiu Pins Vens | 2 |
| CB Alpicat | Alpicat | Pavelló Antoni Roure d'Alpicat | 2 |
| CB Ciutat Vella | Barcelona | CEM Parc de la Ciutadella | 2 |
| CB Santa Coloma | Santa Coloma de Gramenet | Pavelló Joan del Moral | 2 |
| CE Sant Nicolau | Sabadell | CE Sant Nicolau | 2 |
| CEB Girona Citylift | Girona | Pavelló Ramon Sitja | 2 |
| Circol Cotonifici Badalona | Badalona | Pavelló La Plana | 2 |
| Merchanservis CBS | Sant Feliu de Llobregat | Palau Juan Carlos Navarro | 2 |
| Sant Quirze Basquet Club | Sant Quirze del Valles | Poliesportiu Sant Quirze | 2 |
| SESE | Barcelona | Pavelló Municipal Virrei Amat | 2 |
| UE Sant Cugat | Sant Cugat del Vallés | Pavelló Municipal Sant Cugat | 2 |
| Vedruna Gràcia | Barcelona | Poliesportiu Josep Maria de Segarra | 2 |

== Regular season ==
=== Group 1 ===
| Pos | Team | Pld | W | L | PF | PA | PD | Pts | Qualification or relegation |
|---|---|---|---|---|---|---|---|---|---|
| 1 | Tenea-CB Esparreguera (C, P) | 26 | 26 | 0 | 2005 | 1593 | +412 | 52 | Qualification to Final Stage |
| 2 | CB Salou (P) | 26 | 21 | 5 | 2077 | 1733 | +344 | 47 | Qualification to Final Stage |
| 3 | FC Martinenc Bàsquet (P) | 26 | 18 | 8 | 2118 | 1897 | +221 | 44 | Qualification to Final Stage |
| 4 | Zamar 2000 Ploms Salle Reus | 26 | 17 | 9 | 1859 | 1743 | +116 | 43 | Qualification to Final Stage |
| 5 | AE Badalonès | 26 | 16 | 10 | 2046 | 1904 | +142 | 42 | |
| 6 | Lliçà d'Amunt | 26 | 13 | 13 | 1809 | 1854 | −45 | 39 | |
| 7 | CB Granollers | 26 | 11 | 15 | 1780 | 1833 | −53 | 37 | |
| 8 | CB Artés | 26 | 11 | 15 | 1913 | 1992 | −79 | 37 | |
| 9 | BasquetPiaSabadell | 26 | 10 | 16 | 1838 | 2010 | −172 | 36 | |
| 10 | Maristes Ademar Badalona (O) | 26 | 10 | 16 | 1815 | 1928 | −113 | 36 | Qualification to Relegation Playoffs |
| 11 | Outletmoto.com-CB Grup Barna (O) | 26 | 9 | 17 | 1741 | 1855 | −114 | 35 | Qualification to Relegation Playoffs |
| 12 | EsportXTothom-Basquet SAMA Vilanova (R) | 26 | 7 | 19 | 1645 | 1876 | −231 | 33 | Qualification to Relegation Playoffs |
| 13 | Recanvis Gaudí CB Mollet B (O) | 26 | 7 | 19 | 1743 | 1857 | −114 | 33 | Qualification to Relegation Playoffs |
| 14 | Club Natació Sabadell (R) | 26 | 6 | 20 | 1666 | 1980 | −314 | 32 | Relegation to CC 1ª Categoria |

Source: BasquetCatala
(C) Champions; (O) Play-off winners; (P) Promoted; (R) Relegated

=== Group 2 ===
| Pos | Team | Pld | W | L | PF | PA | PD | Pts | Qualification or relegation |
|---|---|---|---|---|---|---|---|---|---|
| 1 | SESE (P) | 26 | 22 | 4 | 2068 | 1753 | +315 | 48 | Qualification to Final Stage |
| 2 | Bàsquet Molins | 26 | 20 | 6 | 2007 | 1781 | +226 | 46 | Qualification to Final Stage |
| 3 | UE Sant Cugat | 26 | 18 | 8 | 1959 | 1788 | +171 | 44 | Qualification to Final Stage |
| 4 | CB Alpicat | 26 | 16 | 10 | 2012 | 1872 | +140 | 42 | Qualification to Final Stage |
| 5 | CB Santa Coloma | 26 | 16 | 10 | 1942 | 1810 | +132 | 42 | |
| 6 | CB Ciutat Vella | 26 | 12 | 14 | 1952 | 2039 | −87 | 38 | |
| 7 | Circol Cotonifici Badalona | 26 | 12 | 14 | 1685 | 1773 | −88 | 38 | |
| 8 | Bàsquet Sitges | 26 | 12 | 14 | 1900 | 1914 | −14 | 38 | |
| 9 | Vedruna Gràcia | 26 | 12 | 14 | 1951 | 2053 | −102 | 38 | |
| 10 | Sant Quirze Basquet Club (R) | 26 | 11 | 15 | 1932 | 2023 | −91 | 37 | Qualification to Relegation Playoffs |
| 11 | CEB Girona Citylift (O) | 26 | 11 | 15 | 1890 | 1835 | +55 | 37 | Qualification to Relegation Playoffs |
| 12 | Merchanservis CBS (R) | 26 | 10 | 16 | 1993 | 2081 | −88 | 36 | Qualification to Relegation Playoffs |
| 13 | AD Torreforta (R) | 26 | 8 | 18 | 1942 | 2090 | −148 | 34 | Qualification to Relegation Playoffs |
| 14 | CE Sant Nicolau (R) | 26 | 2 | 24 | 1668 | 2089 | −421 | 28 | Relegation to CC 1ª Categoria |

Source: BasquetCatala
(O) Play-off winners; (P) Promoted; (R) Relegated

== Relegation PlayOffs ==
The first legs were played on 13 May 2018, the second legs on 20 May 2018 and the third legs, if necessary, on 27 May 2018.

| Team 1 | Series | Team 2 | Game 1 | Game 2 | Game 3 |
|---|---|---|---|---|---|
| Maristes Ademar Badalona | 2-1 | AD Torreforta | 96-67 | 80-83 | 96-73 |
| CEB Girona Citylift | 2-1 | EsportXTothom-Basquet SAMA Vilanova | 63-51 | 63-78 | 72-60 |
| Outletmoto.com CB Grup Barna | 2-1 | Merchanservis CBS | 77-68 | 74-104 | 83-68 |
| Sant Quirze Basquet Club | 0-2 | Recanvis Gaudi CB Mollet B | 66-72 | 77-89 | |

== Final round ==
=== Quarter-finals ===
The first legs will be played on 13–14 May, and the second legs will be played on 20–21 May 2018.

| Team 1 | Agg. | Team 2 | 1st leg | 2nd leg |
|---|---|---|---|---|
| Zamar 2000 Ploms Salle Reus | 131-155 | SESE | 64-76 | 67-79 |
| FC Martinenc Basquet | 146-119 | Basquet Molins | 71-65 | 75-54 |
| UE Sant Cugat | 119-121 | CB Salou | 67-76 | 52-45 |
| CB Alpicat | 130-170 | Tenea-CB Esparreguera | 67-95 | 63-75 |

=== Final Four ===
Games played at Pavelló Municipal in Salou

Semifinals; 26 May
FC Martinenc Basquet | 46
Tenea-CB Esparreguera | 51
CB Salou | 63
SESE | 56

Final; 27 May
Tenea-CB Esparreguera | 71
CB Salou | 63
Third place
FC Martinenc Basquet | 53
SESE | 67

==== Semifinals ====
| May 26, 2018 | FC Martinenc Bàsquet | 46–51 | Tenea-CB Esparreguera | Salou |
| 18:05 | Scoring by quarter: 7-14, 14-12, 11-15, 14-10 |
| La Xarxa | Pts: Perez, Mayor 8 Rebs: Olive 10; Asts: Mayor 5 PIR: Mayor 16 | Box Score | Pts: Morales 25; Rebs: Morales 8 Asts: Romero 3 PIR: Morales 21 | Arena: Pavelló Municipal; Referees: Francesc Xavier Piñol, Gerard Alemany |

| May 26, 2018 | CB Salou | 63–56 | SESE | Salou |
| 20:00 | Scoring by quarter: 13-7, 20-14, 15-18, 15-17 |
| La Xarxa | Pts: Barksdale 21; Rebs: Galofre 9 Asts: Salido, Claveria 3 PIR: Barksdale 27 | Box Score | Pts: Vazquez 14; Rebs: Diaz 10; Asts: Gomez 3 PIR: Vazquez 20 | Arena: Pavelló Municipal; Referees: Raúl Atienzar, Javier Romero |

==== Third place game ====
| May 27, 2018 | FC Martinenc Bàsquet | 53–67 | SESE | Salou |
| 16:00 | Scoring by quarter: 11-16, 13-14, 14-24, 15-13 |
| | Pts: Recasens 11; Rebs: three players 3 Asts: Domínguez 2 PIR: Recasens 11 | Box Score | Pts: López 18; Rebs: López 10; Asts: three players 2 PIR: López 24 | Arena: Pavelló Municipal; Referees: Eduard Rey, Miquel Fernández Sánchez |

==== Championship game ====
| May 28, 2017 | Tenea-CB Esparreguera | 71–63 | CB Salou | Salou |
| 18:05 | Scoring by quarter: 16-12, 17-18, 24-17, 14-16 |
| La Xarxa | Pts: Fontanals 17; Rebs: Romero 6 Asts: Morales 3 PIR: Fontanals 13 | Box Score; Report | Pts: Barksdale 20; Rebs: Galofre 9 Asts: Santiago 3 PIR: Barksdale 23 | Arena: Pavelló Municipal; Referees: Xavier Gotsens, Víctor Carreras |

2017–18 Copa Catalunya champions
Tenea-CB Esparreguera
1st title

== Awards ==
=== MVP ===
- Rubén Morales (Tenea-CB Esparreguera)

== All Star Game ==
The 2018 Copa Catalunya All-star event was held on January 27, 2018 at Pavello Nord in Sabadell.

The White team won the game 92-70. The MVP of the game was Ruben Morales who scored 22 points along with 4 assists and Marquie Smith won the Slam Dunk Contest.

=== Rosters ===
White Team (Group 1)
| Pos | Player | Team |
Starters
| G | Pau Mayor | FC Martinenc |
| F | Eric Balaguer | AE Badalonès |
| F | Alex Pou | Lliçà d'Amunt |
| C | Ruben Morales | Tenea CB Esparreguera |
| C | Eloi Galofré | CB Salou |
Reserves
| G | Franc García | Maristes Ademar Badalona |
| G | Marc Ollé | Club Natació Sabadell |
| G | Arnau Carreras | EsportXTothom SAMA Vilanova |
| F | Damià Paez | BasquetPiaSabadell |
| F | Eduard Boja | CB Artés |
| F | Jonathan Seidi | Recanvis Gaudi CB Mollet B |
| C | Marc Subirachs | Outletmoto.com CB Grup Barna |
| C | Everret Pleasant | Zamar 2000 Ploms Salle Reus |
| C | Carles Homs | CB Granollers |
| C | Courtney J.Barksdale | CB Salou |
Head coach: Oscar Navarro (Tenea CB Esparreguera)
Head coach: Hugo González (FC Martinenc)
Head coach: Jesús Muñiz (CB Salou)

Blue Team (Group 2)
| Pos | Player | Team |
Starters
| G | Alex López | CB Santa Coloma |
| F | Félix López | Bàsquet Molins |
| F | Víctor Vinós | CB Alpicat |
| C | Robert Cosials | UE Sant Cugat |
| C | José Manuel Coego | Merchanservis CBS |
Reserves
| G | Gonzalo Baltà | Sant Quirze BC |
| G | David Justicia | CEB Girona Citylift |
| G | Albert Barquets | SESE |
| G | Francesc Gotzents | Circol Cotonifici Badalona |
| G | Jordi Costa | CE Sant Nicolau |
| F | Sergi Plaza | AD Torreforta |
| C | Luis E.Gonzalez | Vedruna Gràcia |
| C | José A. Bernuz | CB Ciutat Vella |
| C | Seth Goodman | Bàsquet Sitges |
Head coach:Jesús Fernández (Bàsquet Molins)
Head coach:Carles Espona (SESE)
Head coach:Cesc Sempau (UE Sant Cugat)

=== Game ===
| February 27, 2018 | White Team | 92–70 | Blue Team | Sabadell |
| 18:00 | Scoring by quarter: 30-18, 15-20, 18-19, 29-13 |
| La Xarxa | Pts: Morales 22; Rebs: Pou & Barksdale 7 Asts: Morales 4 PIR: Morales 25 | Box Score; Report | Pts: López 12; Rebs: Goodman 9 Asts: Baltà & López 3 PIR: Goodman 13 | Arena: Pavelló Nord; Attendance: 450; Referees: Kilian Martínez Butxaca, Clemente López Martínez, Joan Fanés |
