= 2015–16 Copa Catalunya basketball season =

Copa Catalunya
- Season: 2015–16
- Duration: 19 September 2015 – 29 May 2016
- Teams: 32

Regular season
- Top seed: CB Grup Barna (Group 1); UB Sant Adrià (Group 2)
- Season MVP: Pol Bassas
- Relegated: Sagrada Familia Claror; CB Ipsi-Otto Sylt; CN Terrassa; AE Minguella-Citroën; Sedis Hidrology; Celtic Basquet Molins; Circol Cotonifici Badalona; A.E.S.E.

Finals
- Champions: UB Sant Adrià (1st title)
- Runners-up: Basquet Sitges
- Third place: Groc Restaurant CB Viladecans
- Fourth place: CB Grup Barna
- All statistics correct as of complete.

The 2015–16 Copa Catalunya was the 17th season of Copa Catalunya.

The Final Four was played at the Pavelló Municipal in Sant Adrià de Besós. UB Sant Adrià won the title.

Copa Federació was played at Podium Joan Masgrau in Viladecans. UB Sant Adrià won the title.

== Format ==
=== Regular season ===
32 teams are divided in two groups by geographical criteria.

=== Final stage ===
The Final Stage will be played in play-off ties in a two-legged format, with the exception of the final four.

=== Relegation PlayOffs ===
In the relegation playoffs, teams played against each other must win two games to win the series. The winners remain at Copa Catalunya for the next season.

== Teams ==
=== Venues and locations ===
Team	Home city	Arena	Group
AB El Vendrell	Comarruga	Pavelló Santa Maria del Mar	1
A.E.S.E.	L'Hospitalet de Llobregat	Poliesportiu Santa Eulalia	1
Aracena-AEC Collblanc B	L'Hospitalet de Llobregat	Pav. Municipal Fum d'Estampa	1
Basquet Sitges	Sitges	Pavelló Poliesportiu Pins Vens	1
CB Ciutat Vella	Barcelona	CEM Parc de la Ciutadella	1
CB Grup Barna	Barcelona	Nau Parc Clot	1
CB Ipsi-Otto Sylt	Barcelona	Poliesportiu Ipsi	1
CB Valls Nutrion Internacional	Valls	Pavelló Joana Ballart	1
Camping Bianya Roser	Barcelona	Pol.Municipal Estacio del Nord	1
Celtic Basquet Molins	Molins de Rei	Pavelló Municipal Molins de Rei	1
Groc Restaurant CB Viladecans-Sant Gabriel	Viladecans	Podium Joan Masgrau	1
Lluisos de Gràcia	Barcelona	Lluisos de Gràcia	1
Sagrada Familia Claror	Barcelona	Esportiu Claror	1
SESE	Barcelona	Pavelló Municipal Virrei Amat	1
Tenea CB Esparreguera	Esparreguera	Pavelló Ramon Marti	1
Zamar 2000-Ploms Salle Reus	Reus	Pavelló Joan Sorolla	1
AE Minguella-Citroën Automoció Badalona	Badalona	Poliesportiu Casagemas	2
CB Alpicat	Alpicat	Pavelló Antoni Roure d'Alpicat	2
CB Castellar	Castellar del Vallès	Nou Pavelló Zona Puigverd	2
CB Cerdanyola al Dia	Cerdanyola del Vallès	Parc Esportiu Municipal Guiera	2
CB Granollers	Granollers	Pavelló CB Granollers	2
CB Sant Josep	Badalona	C.P. Sant Josep Badalona	2
CB Vic-Universitat de Vic	Vic	Pav. Castell d'en Planes	2
CN Terrassa	Terrassa	Centre d'Esports Bonaire	2
Círcol Cotonifici Badalona	Badalona	Pavello La Plana	2
La Llosa Artés	Artés	Pavelló Esportiu d'Artés	2
Mataró-Feimat	Mataró	Palau d'Esports Josep Mora	2
Mataró Parc Boet	Mataró	Poliesportiu Eusebi Millan	2
Sedis Hidrology	La Seu d'Urgell	Palau d'Esports Seu d'Urgell	2
Sol Gironès Bisbal Bàsquet	La Bisbal d'Empordà	Pav.Mun. de la Bisbal d'Empordà	2
UB Sant Adrià	Sant Adrià de Besós	Pavelló Municipal Sant Adrià	2
UE Sant Cugat	Sant Cugat del Vallès	Pavelló Municipal Sant Cugat	2

== Regular season ==
=== Group 1 ===
Pos	Team	Pld	W	L	PF	PA	PD	Pts	Qualification or relegation
1	CB Grup Barna (P)	30	24	6	2333	1962	+371	54	Qualification to Final Stage
2	Groc Restaurant CB Viladecans-Sant Gabriel ^{1} (P)	30	23	7	2292	2130	+162	53	Qualification to Final Stage
3	Bàsquet Sitges (P)	30	20	10	2143	2013	+130	50	Qualification to Final Stage
4	Lluisos de Gràcia	30	19	11	1928	1816	+112	49	Qualification to Final Stage
5	Camping Bianya Roser	30	18	12	2056	1940	+116	48	
6	Zamar 2000-Ploms Salle Reus	30	16	14	2196	2134	+62	46	
7	CB Valls Nutrion Internacional ^{2}	30	16	14	2341	2253	+88	46	
8	Aracena-AEC Collblanc B	30	15	15	2068	2074	−6	45	
9	SESE	30	15	15	2095	2141	−46	45	
10	AB El Vendrell ^{3}	30	14	16	2114	2112	+2	44	
11	Tenea CB Esparreguera (O)	30	14	16	2063	2134	−71	44	Qualification to Relegation Playoffs
12	A.E.S.E. (R)	30	12	18	1853	1948	−95	42	Qualification to Relegation Playoffs
13	Celtic Bàsquet Molins (R)	30	12	18	1880	1950	−70	42	Qualification to Relegation Playoffs
14	CB Ciutat Vella (O)	30	10	20	1987	2160	−173	40	Qualification to Relegation Playoffs
15	Sagrada Familia Claror (R)	30	7	23	1868	2155	−287	37	Relegation to CC 1ª Categoria
16	CB Ipsi-Otto Sylt (R)	30	5	25	1917	2212	−295	35	Relegation to CC 1ª Categoria

Source: basquetcatala.cat
(O) Play-off winners; (P) Promoted; (R) Relegated

^{1} CB Viladecans resigned to its place in Liga EBA.
^{2} CB Valls achieved a vacant berth in Liga EBA.
^{3} AB El Vendrell exchanges a place on CC 2ª Categoria with AD Torreforta.

=== Group 2 ===
Pos	Team	Pld	W	L	PF	PA	PD	Pts	Qualification or relegation
1	UB Sant Adrià (C, P, X)	30	25	5	2498	2123	+375	55	Qualification to Final Stage
2	Mataró-Feimat ^{1}	30	24	6	2237	2033	+204	54	Qualification to Final Stage
3	CB Sant Josep	30	23	7	2371	2097	+274	53	Qualification to Final Stage
4	CB Cerdanyola al Dia ^{2}	30	20	10	2163	2059	+104	50	Qualification to Final Stage
5	CB Vic-Universitat de Vic	30	19	11	2238	2024	+214	49	
6	Mataró Parc Boet	30	18	12	2372	2231	+141	48	
7	La Llosa Artès	30	17	13	2287	2244	+43	47	
8	UE Sant Cugat	30	16	14	2168	2165	+3	46	
9	CB Granollers	30	15	15	2100	2100	0	45	
10	Sol Gironès Bisbal Bàsquet	30	13	17	2145	2165	−20	43	
11	Círcol Cotonifici Badalona (R)	30	12	18	2046	2091	−45	42	Qualification to Relegation Playoffs
12	CB Alpicat (O)	30	11	19	2170	2315	−145	41	Qualification to Relegation Playoffs
13	CB Castellar (O)	30	10	20	2081	2235	−154	40	Qualification to Relegation Playoffs
14	Sedis Hidrology (R)	30	6	24	1764	2213	−449	36	Qualification to Relegation Playoffs
15	CN Terrassa (R)	30	6	24	1850	2109	−259	36	Relegation to CC 1ª Categoria
16	AE Minguella-Citroën Automoció Badalona (R)	30	5	25	1880	2166	−286	35	Relegation to CC 1ª Categoria

Source: basquetcatala.cat
(C) Champions; (O) Play-off winners; (P) Promoted; (R) Relegated; (X) Champion of the Copa Federació

^{1} UE Mataró achieved a vacant berth in Liga EBA
^{2} CB Cerdanyola achieved a vacant berth in Liga EBA

== Relegation PlayOffs ==
The first legs were played on 15 May 2016, the second legs on 22 May 2016 and the third legs, if necessary, on 29 May 2016.

Team 1	Series	Team 2	Game 1	Game 2	Game 3
Tenea CB Esparreguera	2–0	Sedis Hidrology	77–66	77–74	
Círcol Cotonifici Badalona	1–2	CB Ciutat Vella	83–72	67–74	57–60
CB Alpicat	2–0	Celtic Bàsquet Molins	82–74	65–59	
A.E.S.E.	1–2	CB Castellar	84–68	55–64	48–66

== Final round ==
=== Quarter-finals ===
The first legs was played on 14–15 May, and the second legs was played on 21–22 May 2016.

Team 1	Agg.	Team 2	1st leg	2nd leg
Lluisos de Gràcia	111–125	UB Sant Adrià	52–54	59–71
Bàsquet Sitges	141–126	Mataró-Feimat	83–67	58–59
CB Sant Josep	173–179	Groc Restaurant CB Viladecans	79–81	94–98
CB Cerdanyola al Dia	149–151	CB Grup Barna	62–65	87–86

=== Final four ===
Games played at the Pavelló Municipal in Sant Adrià de Besós

==== Bracket ====
Semifinals; 28 May
Bàsquet Sitges	72
CB Grup Barna	67
Groc Restaurant CB Viladecans	73
UB Sant Adrià	79

Final; 29 May
Bàsquet Sitges	55
UB Sant Adrià	75
Third place
CB Grup Barna	79
Groc Restaurant CB Viladecans	81

==== Semifinals ====
May 28, 2016	Bàsquet Sitges	72–67	CB Grup Barna	Sant Adrià de Besós
17:00	Scoring by quarter: 28-13, 13-18, 13-12, 18-24
	Pts: Velasco 20; Rebs: Riu 13; Asts: three players 2 PIR: Riu 26	Box Score	Pts: Rabaseda 21; Rebs: Rabaseda 9 Asts: Rabaseda & Maldonado 3 PIR: Rabaseda 22	Arena: Pavelló Municipal; Referees: Jordi Renart, Sergi Tello

May 28, 2016	Groc Restaurant CB Viladecans-Sant Gabriel	73–79	UB Sant Adrià	Sant Adrià de Besós
19:00	Scoring by quarter: 21-18, 24-20, 14-29, 14-12
	Pts: Sese 15; Rebs: Boronat 9 Asts: Martínez 6 PIR: Martínez 19	Box Score	Pts: Nogales 18; Rebs: Serra 16; Asts: Bassas & Serra 3 PIR: Bassas & Serra 21	Arena: Pavelló Municipal; Attendance: 1000; Referees: Sergi Martínez Mombiela, Antonio Canle

==== Third place game ====
May 29, 2016	CB Grup Barna	79–81	Groc Restaurant CB Viladecans-Sant Gabriel	Sant Adrià de Besós
17:00	Scoring by quarter: 25-20, 21-28, 16-17, 17-16
	Pts: Martínez 19; Rebs: Capelles 12; Asts: Cantero 3 PIR: Capelles 25	Box Score	Pts: Boronat 17; Rebs: Martínez 9 Asts: Haro 9 PIR: Sese & Martínez 14	Arena: Pavelló Municipal; Referees: Francesc de Asis Marín, Guillem Villaró

==== Championship game ====
May 29, 2016	Bàsquet Sitges	55–75	UB Sant Adrià	Sant Adrià de Besós
19:00	Scoring by quarter: 10-13, 9-22, 19-20, 17-20
	Pts: Pérez 10; Rebs: Rodríguez 10; Asts: three players 1 PIR: Rodríguez 12	Box Score; Report	Pts: Roure 15; Rebs: Serra 8 Asts: Bassas 5 PIR: Bassas 16	Arena: Pavelló Municipal; Referees: Quique Peguero, Christian Ruíz Ramírez-Cruzado

2015–16 Copa Catalunya champions
UB Sant Adrià
1st title

== Awards ==
=== MVP ===
- Pol Bassas (UB Sant Adrià)

== Copa Federació ==
The Copa Federació was played on 2–3 January 2016, by the four best teams after the end of the year (round 13) in both groups. Games was played at Podium Joan Masgrau in Viladecans.

=== Bracket ===
Semifinals; 2 Jan
CB Viladecans-Sant Gabriel	61
UB Sant Adrià	80
CB Sant Josep	75
CB Grup Barna	72

Final; 3 Jan
UB Sant Adrià	90
CB Sant Josep	69

=== Semifinals ===
Jan 2, 2016	CB Viladecans-Sant Gabriel	61–80	UB Sant Adrià	Viladecans
16:00	Scoring by quarter: 17-20, 14-33, 19-13, 11-14
	Pts: Raventós 14; Rebs: Sese 9 Asts: Sese 3 PIR: Haro 13	Box Score	Pts: Herrerías & Pérez 11; Rebs: Serra 9 Asts: Bassas & Serra 3 PIR: Morua 13	Arena: Podium Joan Masgrau; Attendance: 200; Referees: Antonio Canle, Marc Algueró

Jan 2, 2016	CB Sant Josep	75–72	CB Grup Barna	Viladecans
17:45	Scoring by quarter: 18-17, 20-14, 15-29, 22-12
	Pts: Arimon 18; Rebs: Cuesta 10; Asts: Rodríguez 3 PIR: Arimon 18	Box Score	Pts: Martínez 22; Rebs: Maldonado 15; Asts: Rabaseda 9 PIR: Rabaseda 27	Arena: Podium Joan Masgrau; Attendance: 225; Referees: Javier Oliver, Eduard Rey

=== Championship game ===
Jan 3, 2016	UB Sant Adrià	90–69	CB Sant Josep	Viladecans
12:00	Scoring by quarter: 23-12, 18-20, 31-14, 18-23
	Pts: Tort 16; Rebs: Bassas & Serra 7 Asts: Bassas 6 PIR: Tort 17	Box Score; Report	Pts: Cuesta 14; Rebs: Cuesta 13; Asts: Olivares & Cuesta 2 PIR: Cuesta 18	Arena: Podium Joan Masgrau; Attendance: 100; Referees: Sergi Martínez Mombiela, Armando Osorio

2015–16 Copa Federació champions
UB Sant Adrià
1st title
