= 2016–17 Copa Catalunya basketball season =

Copa Catalunya
- Season: 2016–17
- Duration: 1 October 2016 – 28 May 2017
- Teams: 28
- TV partner(s): La Xarxa

Regular season
- Top seed: Mataró Parc Boet (Group 1); Camping Bianya Roser (Group 2)
- Season MVP: Dario Naharro
- Relegated: Sant Gervasi; Sol Gironés Bisbal Bàsquet; Lluïsos de Gràcia; Bàsquet Sant Boi; CB Castellar; CB Viladecans-Sant Gabriel

Finals
- Champions: Mataró Parc Boet (1st title)
- Runners-up: Aracena-CB Sant Josep
- Third place: CB Vic-Universitat de Vic
- Fourth place: Camping Bianya Roser
- All statistics correct as of complete.

The 2016–17 Copa Catalunya was the 18th season of Copa Catalunya. This season the competition was reduced from 32 to 28 teams.

The Final Four was played at the Pavelló Municipal in Salou. Mataró Parc Boet won the title.

For the first time an All Star match was played by the best players of each group. The All Star Game was played at Parc Esportiu Llobregat in Cornellà de Llobregat. The All Star replaced the Copa Federació that played the last seasons.

== Format ==
=== Regular season ===
28 teams are divided in two groups by geographical criteria.

=== Final Stage ===
The Final Stage will be played in play-off ties in a two-legged format, with the exception of the final four.

=== Relegation PlayOffs ===
In the relegation playoffs, teams played against each other must win two games to win the series. The winners remain at Copa Catalunya for the next season.

== Teams ==
=== Promotion and relegation (pre-season) ===
A total of 28 teams contest the league, including 17 sides from the 2015–16 season and ten promoted from the 2015–16 CC 1ª Categoria. On July 7, 2016, AB El Vendrell exchanges a place on CC 2ª Categoria with AD Torreforta. On July 19, 2016, CB Valls Nutrion Internacional achieved a vacant on Liga EBA. On July 20, 2016, Mataró-Feimat and CB Cerdanyola al Dia achieved a vacant on Liga EBA. Finally, CB Viladecans-Sant Gabriel renounces his place in Liga EBA

Teams promoted from CC 1ª Categoria

- Club Natació Sabadell
- CB Santa Coloma
- Sant Gervasi
- AE Badalonès
- Whats Up!-BasquetPiaSabadell
- Verma Alquiler de Maquinaria-CB Salou
- CB Sant Narcís
- Sant Quirze Basquet Club
- CB Cantaires Tortosa
- Basquet Sant Boi

=== Venues and locations ===
Team	Home city	Arena	Group
AE Badalonès	Badalona	Pavelló La Plana	1
Aracena-CB Sant Josep-El Rebost	Badalona	C.P. Sant Josep Badalona	1
CB Artés	Artés	Pavelló Esportiu d'Artés	1
CB Granollers	Granollers	Pavelló CB Granollers	1
CB Sant Narcís	Girona	Pav. Municipal Palau Sacosta de Girona	1
CB Santa Coloma	Santa Coloma de Gramenet	Pavelló Joan del Moral	1
CB Vic-Universitat de Vic	Vic	Pav. Castell d'en Planes	1
Club Natació Sabadell	Sabadell	Pavelló Les Naus	1
Mataró Parc Boet	Mataró	Poliesportiu Eusebi Millan	1
Sant Gervasi	Mollet del Vallès	Escola Sant Gervasi	1
Sant Quirze Basquet Club	Sant Quirze del Valles	Gimnas Municipal Sant Quirze	1
Sol Gironès Bisbal Bàsquet	La Bisbal d'Empordà	Pav.Mun. de la Bisbal d'Empordà	1
UE Sant Cugat	Sant Cugat del Vallès	Pavelló Municipal Sant Cugat	1
Whats Up!-BasquetPiaSabadell	Sabadell	Escola Pia Sabadell	1
AD Torreforta	Tarragona	Casal Riu Clar	2
Aracena AEC Collblanc B	L'Hospitalet de Llobregat	Pav. Municipal Fum d'Estampa	2
Basquet Sant Boi	Sant Boi de Llobregat	Pavelló Can Masallera	2
CB Alpicat	Alpicat	Pavelló Antoni Roure d'Alpicat	2
CB Cantaires Tortosa	Tortosa	Pavelló de Ferreries	2
CB Castellar	Castellar del Vallès	Nou Pavelló Zona Puigverd	2
CB Ciutat Vella	Barcelona	CEM Parc de la Ciutadella	2
CB Viladecans-Sant Gabriel	Viladecans	Podium Joan Masgrau	2
Camping Bianya Roser	Barcelona	Pol.Municipal Estacio del Nord	2
Lluisos de Gràcia	Barcelona	Lluisos de Gràcia	2
SESE	Barcelona	Pavelló Municipal Virrei Amat	2
Tenea-CB Esparreguera	Esparreguera	Pavelló Ramon Marti	2
Verma Alquiler de Maquinaria-CB Salou	Salou	Pavelló Municipal	2
Zamar 2000 Ploms Salle Reus	Reus	Pavelló Joan Sorolla	2

== Regular season ==
=== Group 1 ===
Pos	Team	Pld	W	L	PF	PA	PD	Pts	Qualification or relegation
1	Mataró Parc Boet (C, P)	26	22	4	2141	1950	+191	48	Qualification to Final Stage
2	Aracena-CB Sant Josep-El Rebost (P)	26	21	5	2039	1820	+219	47	Qualification to Final Stage
3	CB Vic-Universitat de Vic (P)	26	19	7	2208	1903	+305	45	Qualification to Final Stage
4	UE Sant Cugat	26	19	7	1932	1804	+128	45	Qualification to Final Stage
5	CB Artés	26	18	8	2227	2078	+149	44	
6	CB Santa Coloma	26	15	11	1999	1944	+55	41	
7	CB Granollers	26	12	14	1828	1862	−34	38	
8	CB Sant Narcis^{1}	26	11	15	1894	1929	−35	37	
9	AE Badalonès	26	10	16	1847	1925	−78	36	
10	Club Natació Sabadell (O)	26	10	16	1786	2004	−218	36	Qualification to Relegation Playoffs
11	Sant Quirze Bàsquet Club (O)	26	7	19	2009	2174	−165	33	Qualification to Relegation Playoffs
12	Sant Gervasi (R)	26	6	20	1925	2086	−161	32	Qualification to Relegation Playoffs
13	Whats Up!-BàsquetPiaSabadell (O)	26	6	20	1919	2019	−100	32	Qualification to Relegation Playoffs
14	Sol Gironés Bisbal Bàsquet (R)	26	6	20	1731	1987	−256	32	Relegation to CC 1ª Categoria

Source: basquetcatala.cat
(C) Champions; (O) Play-off winners; (P) Promoted; (R) Relegated

^{1} CB Sant Narcís exchanges a place on Liga EBA with CE Sant Nicolau

=== Group 2 ===
Pos	Team	Pld	W	L	PF	PA	PD	Pts	Qualification or relegation
1	Camping Bianya Roser (P)	26	22	4	1918	1644	+274	48	Qualification to Final Stage
2	Tenea-CB Esparreguera	26	20	6	1915	1692	+223	46	Qualification to Final Stage
3	Verma Alquiler de Maquinaria-CB Salou	26	20	6	1909	1687	+222	46	Qualification to Final Stage
4	SESE	26	19	7	1897	1795	+102	45	Qualification to Final Stage
5	Zamar 2000 Ploms Salle Reus	26	16	10	1878	1811	+67	42	
6	CB Cantaires Tortosa^{1}	26	15	11	2036	1931	+105	41	
7	CB Ciutat Vella	26	13	13	2035	1915	+120	39	
8	Aracena AEC Collblanc B^{2}	26	13	13	1857	1909	−52	39	
9	AD Torreforta	26	12	14	1944	2040	−96	38	
10	Lluïsos de Gràcia (R)	26	11	15	1674	1623	+51	37	Qualification to Relegation PlayOffs
11	CB Alpicat (O)	26	9	17	1828	1891	−63	35	Qualification to Relegation PlayOffs
12	Bàsquet Sant Boi (R)	26	5	21	1687	1984	−297	31	Qualification to Relegation PlayOffs
13	CB Castellar (R)	26	4	22	1693	2039	−346	30	Qualification to Relegation PlayOffs
14	CB Viladecans-Sant Gabriel (R)	26	3	23	1656	1966	−310	29	Relegation to CC 1ª Categoria

Source: BasquetCatala
(O) Play-off winners; (P) Promoted; (R) Relegated

^{1} CB Cantaires Tortosa achieved a vacant on Liga EBA.
^{2} Aracena AEC Collblanc B resigned to its place in Copa Catalunya.

== Relegation PlayOffs ==
The first legs were played on 13 May 2017, the second legs on 20 May 2017 and the third legs, if necessary, on 27 May 2017.

Team 1	Series	Team 2	Game 1	Game 2	Game 3
Club Natació Sabadell	2–1	CB Castellar	53–87	76–65	71–60
CB Alpicat	2–1	Sant Gervasi	86–74	75–95	84–81
Sant Quirze Bàsquet Club	2–1	Bàsquet Sant Boi	92–81	58–65	96–86
Lluïsos de Gràcia	1–2	Whats Up!-BàsquetPiaSabadell	88–80	62–71	79–80

== Final round ==
=== Quarter-finals ===
The first legs will be played on 13–14 May, and the second legs will be played on 20–21 May 2017.

Team 1	Agg.	Team 2	1st leg	2nd leg
Camping Bianya Roser	145–118	UE Sant Cugat	64–49	81–69
Tenea-CB Esparreguera	140–153	CB Vic-Universitat de Vic	57–84	83–69
Aracena-CB Sant Josep-El Rebost	164–137	Verma Alquiler de Maquinaria-CB Salou	83–76	81–61
Mataró Parc Boet	162–141	SESE	73–62	89–79

=== Final four ===
Games played at Pavelló Municipal in Salou

==== Bracket ====
Semifinals; 27 May
CB Vic-Universitat de Vic	71
Mataró Parc Boet	88
Aracena-CB Sant Josep	74
Camping Bianya Roser	65

Final; 28 May
Mataró Parc Boet	74
Aracena-CB Sant Josep	66
Third place
CB Vic-Universitat de Vic	84
Camping Bianya Roser	66

==== Semifinals ====
May 27, 2017	CB Vic-Universitat de Vic	71–88	Mataró Parc Boet	Salou
18:00	Scoring by quarter: 20-32, 14-19, 22-17, 15-20
La Xarxa	Pts: Garrote 25; Rebs: Vidal 7 Asts: Balanzo 2 PIR: Garrote 23	Box Score	Pts: Rubio 20; Rebs: Champagnie 11; Asts: Naharro 8 PIR: Naharro 23	Arena: Pavelló Municipal; Referees: Xavier Berasaluce, Esteban García Martínez

May 27, 2017	Aracena-CB Sant Josep-El Rebost	74–65	Camping Bianya Roser	Salou
20:00	Scoring by quarter: 21-18, 26-7, 15-18, 12-22
La Xarxa	Pts: Cuesta 15; Rebs: Cuesta 8 Asts: Meruelo 4 PIR: Cuesta 20	Box Score	Pts: Sulleva 15; Rebs: Sulleva & Assalit 6 Asts: Assalit 2 PIR: Sulleva 18	Arena: Pavelló Municipal; Referees: Clemente López Martínez, Jorge Baena

==== Third place game ====
May 28, 2017	CB Vic-Universitat de Vic	84–66	Camping Bianya Roser	Salou
10:00	Scoring by quarter: 28-18, 20-14, 14-20, 22-14
	Pts: Comas 18; Rebs: Pou 12; Asts: Iglesias 6 PIR: Comas & Pou 17	Box Score	Pts: Assalit 22; Rebs: Assalit 8 Asts: Assalit & Tubert 2 PIR: Assalit 25	Arena: Pavelló Municipal; Referees: Juan Carlos Muñoz Jara, Eric Carrera

==== Championship game ====
May 28, 2017	Mataró Parc Boet	74–66	Aracena-CB Sant Josep-El Rebost	Salou
12:30	Scoring by quarter: 20-18, 24-19, 13-17, 17-12
La Xarxa	Pts: Naharro 20; Rebs: Champagnie 16; Asts: Canals 5 PIR: Champagnie 20	Box Score; Report	Pts: Ruíz 16; Rebs: Guelle & Holland 8 Asts: Fons 4 PIR: Ruíz 17	Arena: Pavelló Municipal; Referees: Ferran Puchol, Andres Fernández Carretero

2016–17 Copa Catalunya champions
Mataró Parc Boet
1st title

== Awards ==
=== MVP ===
- Dario Naharro (Mataró Parc Boet)

== All Star Game ==
The 2017 Copa Catalunya All-star event was held on January 7, 2017 at Parc Esportiu Llobregat in Cornellà de Llobregat.

The White team won the game 78-75. The MVP of the game was Alex López who scored 11 points along with 4 rebounds, Juli Garrote won de 3 points Contest and Marquie Smith won the Slam Dunk Contest.
