= CB Tíjola =

Basketball team in Tíjola, Almería, Spain

- Leagues: LEB Plata
- Founded: 1992
- Dissolved: 2011
- Arena: Polideportivo Municipal
- Location: Tíjola, Almería (province)
- Team colors: White and blue
- President: José Antonio Martínez
- Head coach: Antonio Herrera
- Website: www.cbtijola.es
Home	Away

Club Baloncesto Tíjola, more commonly referred today by its sponsorship name Promobys Tíjola, is a professional basketball team based in the town of Tíjola in Almería, Andalusia. On 2011, the club resigned to the berth in LEB Plata.

== Season by season ==
Season	Tier	Division	Pos.	W–L	Cup competitions	
2005–06	4	Liga EBA	13th	11–19		
2006–07	4	Liga EBA	9th (Note: Joined the newly created LEB Bronce.)	10–16		
2007–08	4	LEB Bronce	13th	13–19		
2008–09	4	LEB Bronce	5th (Note: After the dissolution of the LEB Bronce, the club was invited to join LEB Plata.)	21–15	Copa LEB Bronce	RU
2009–10	3	LEB Plata	3rd	30–13		
2010–11	3	LEB Plata	4th	24–13		
