= Emil Igwenagu =

American football player (born 1989)

No. 41
- Positions: Fullback, tight end

Personal information
- Born: March 27, 1989 (age 37); Raleigh, North Carolina, U.S.
- Listed height: 6 ft 1 in (1.85 m)
- Listed weight: 238 lb (108 kg)

Career information
- High school: Holy Name (Worcester, Massachusetts)
- College: Massachusetts
- NFL draft: 2012: undrafted

Career history
- Philadelphia Eagles (2012–2013); Detroit Lions (2014–2015)*; Indianapolis Colts (2016)*
- * Offseason or practice squad member only

Awards and highlights
- First-team All-Colonial Athletic Association (2011)
- Stats at Pro Football Reference

Emil Igwenagu (born March 27, 1989) is an American former football fullback. He signed with the Philadelphia Eagles in 2012 as an undrafted free agent. He made his NFL debut on December 13, 2012 against the Cincinnati Bengals, making one tackle on special teams. He played college football at Massachusetts.

== College career ==
Igwenagu attended the University of Massachusetts where he played both fullback and tight end. He earned all-conference honors during his senior season. At the end of his senior year, Igwenagu was invited to the NFL Scouting Combine. Going into the draft, scouts projected Igwenagu to be taken in the late rounds because he had potential on special teams.

== Professional career ==
=== Philadelphia Eagles ===
Igwenagu was not drafted in the 2012 NFL draft, but signed as an undrafted free agent with the Philadelphia Eagles. He played multiple positions during the Eagles' training camp, but impressed coaches the most while playing tight end when Brent Celek got injured during camp. On August 31, 2012, Igwenagu was waived. Igwenagu didn't make the team out of camp, but was signed to the practice squad on September 1, 2012. Another injury to Celek allowed Igwenagu to be promoted to the active roster from the practice squad on December 11, 2012. After Eagles tight end Clay Harbor was placed on injured reserve, Igwenagu and Celek were the only two tight ends on the active roster. Igwenagu made his NFL debut on December 13, 2012. On October 14, 2013, he was waived. On October 16, 2013, Igwenagu was signed to the Eagles' practice squad. He was released by the Eagles on August 23, 2014.

=== Detroit Lions ===
Igwenagu was claimed off waivers by the Detroit Lions on August 25, 2014. He was released by the Detroit Lions on August 30, 2014 during final roster cuts. Igwenagu was signed to the Lions' practice squad on August 31, 2014. On January 6, 2015, Igwenagu signed a reserve/future contract with the Lions. On September 5, 2015, he was waived.

=== Indianapolis Colts ===
On July 19, 2016, Igwenagu signed with the Indianapolis Colts. On August 21, 2016, he was waived by the Colts.
