= Christopher Greener =

British actor (1943–2015)

- Born: 21 November 1943; New Brighton, Wallasey, England
- Died: 11 February 2015 (aged 71); Bromley, England
- Known for: One of Britain's tallest men
- Height: 7 ft 6.25 in (229.24 cm)

Christopher Paul Greener (21 November 1943 – 11 February 2015) was a British actor and basketball player who went on to represent the United Kingdom.

Greener was born in New Brighton, Wallasey, Cheshire. He was, at one point, the tallest man in the United Kingdom and, at the time of his death, was the 4th tallest British-born man (after William Bradley, Neil Fingleton and Paul Sturgess) at 7 ft 6 1/4 in (2.29 m) in height. His weight ranged from 20 to 30 stone (130 to 190 kg) during adulthood. From a very young age, Greener had a tumour at the base of his pituitary gland, which controls the release of human growth hormone. As a result of the tumour, Greener's pituitary gland released more growth hormone than in an average person, and he would have continued to grow had the tumour not been treated with radiation therapy when he was in his late 20s. He was 19 inches (48 cm) in length when he was born, with an average weight, and he followed the development standards of his age during his first year of life. He was measured at 29 inches (74 cm) on his 1st birthday, but his growth began to accelerate after this point. He grew 23 inches (58 cm) within three years, reaching 4 ft 4 in (1.32 m) by the age of four. After this initial growth spurt, he continued to grow steadily and continuously. He was 6 ft 7 in (2.01 m) tall at 16 and worked for a shipping company.

His condition, pituitary gigantism, was not diagnosed until 1970 when Greener was 27 years old and 7 ft 5 1/4 in (226.7 cm) tall, already the record-holder as the tallest man in Britain for over 2 years with varying heights due to his continuous growth. He received treatment upon diagnosis, but because radiation therapy requires time to take effect, he grew another inch in the following year(s), reaching 7 ft 6 1/4 in (229.2 cm). When Greener was first recognised as the tallest British man on 11 December 1967, he was 7 ft 3.11 in (221.26 cm) tall and weighed 18 stone (110 kg). He held the record for 40 years, from 1967 to 2007, when Neil Fingleton officially took over the title from him.

In the late 1960s and early 1970s, Greener was an international basketball player for the Great Britain team and was often at the Crystal Palace National Sports Centre.

Greener worked as an actor, often serving in various comedy roles focused on his great height. He played the circus giant in David Lynch's The Elephant Man. He appeared in several documentaries chronicling the lives of the very tall, including the World's Tallest People television special on The Learning Channel in the United States and Superhuman: Giants on the UK's ITV. He provided the voice of Mighty One-Eye in the workprint of Richard Williams's animated film The Thief and the Cobbler. However, the film was released in an unfinished state, and his voice was dubbed over by Christopher Greener.

On 14 February 2011, he appeared on an episode of The Gadget Show on Five in the UK to test out phones by dropping them.

He died in 2015, aged 71, in Hayes, Bromley.

== Filmography ==
Year	Title	Role	Notes
1972	The Canterbury Tales	Sir Elephant	Uncredited
1975	The Old Curiosity Shop	Giant	
1980	The Elephant Man	Giant	
1986	Sky Bandits	Strong man	
1989	Sedem jednou ranou - the valiant little tailor (Brothers Grimm)	Giant	
1990	The Rainbow Thief	Caesar, the Healer	
