= Ian O'Leary =

American-Irish basketball player

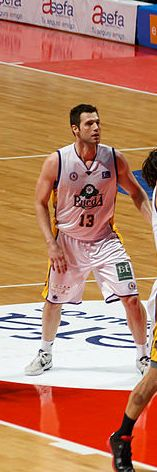

Free agent
- Position: Power forward

Personal information
- Born: October 20, 1986 (age 40) Woodland, California
- Listed height: 6 ft 7 in (2.01 m)
- Listed weight: 220 lb (100 kg)

Career information
- High school: Woodland Christian (Woodland, California)
- College: Saint Mary's (2005–2009)
- NBA draft: 2009: undrafted
- Playing career: 2009–present

Career history
- 2009–2010: Ciudad de Vigo
- 2010–2011: Oviedo
- 2011–2012: Palencia
- 2012–2013: Valladolid
- 2013–2015: Gran Canaria
- 2015–2016: Canarias
- 2016–2019: Fuenlabrada

Career highlights
- LEB Plata MVP (2011)

Ian O'Leary (October 20, 1986) is an American-Irish basketball player who last played for Montakit Fuenlabrada.

== Professional career ==
O'Leary started his professional career with Ciudad de Vigo Básquet, finishing in the last position of the 2009–10 LEB Oro season. One year later, he signed for Oviedo CB of the LEB Plata. He performed 16.0 points and 9.5 rebounds per game and was claimed as MVP of the 2010–11 season.

O'Leary came back to LEB Oro in 2011 after signing a one-year deal with Palencia Baloncesto before making his debut in Liga ACB with Blancos de Rueda Valladolid. He only stayed the 2012–13 season with the Castilian team before signing with Herbalife Gran Canaria.

In April 2015, he played the 2015 Eurocup Finals with the Canarian team.

== The Basketball Tournament ==
Ian O'Leary played for Team Gael Force in the 2018 edition of The Basketball Tournament. In three games, he had 14.3 points per game and a team-high 10.7 rebounds per game on 59 percent shooting. Team Gael Force made it to the Super 16 before falling to eventual tournament runner-up Eberlein Drive.
