= St. Paul Diocesan Junior-Senior High School =

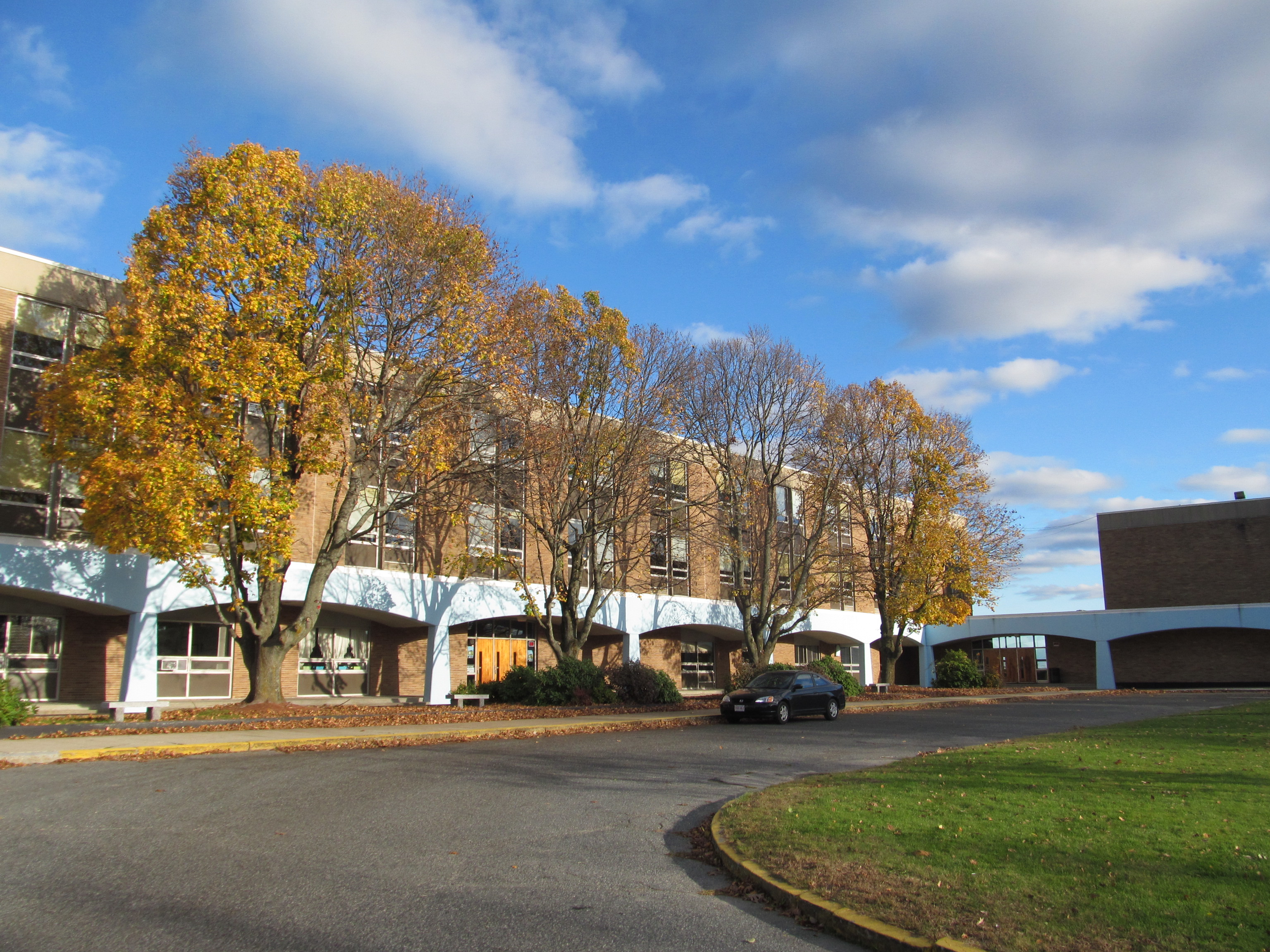
- St. Paul Diocesan Junior-Senior High School

Location
- 144 Granite Street; Worcester, Massachusetts 01604; United States
- 42°14′32″N 71°47′3″W

Information
- Type: Private, co-educational
- Motto: Fortior Unus
- Religious affiliation: Roman Catholic (all religions accepted)
- Denomination: Roman Catholic
- Established: 2020
- Founder: Sisters of Saint Anne
- Status: open
- School district: Worcester
- Grades: 7–12
- Average class size: 23
- Campus: Urban
- Colors: Black and Gold
- Athletics conference: Central Massachusetts Athletic Conference
- Mascot: Knights
- Accreditation: New England Association of Schools and Colleges
- Website: http://www.saintpaulknights.org

St. Paul Diocesan Junior-Senior High School is a private, Roman Catholic high school in Worcester, Massachusetts, United States, associated with the Roman Catholic Diocese of Worcester. It was established on the site of Holy Name Central Catholic Junior Senior High School.

== History ==
Holy Name High School opened on September 14, 1942. The new high school offered a bilingual program in French and English. By 1946, student enrollment had grown to 122 students and, in 1957, Holy Name’s status was changed to a Central Catholic High School. On September 24, 1967, the school moved from Illinois Street to Granite Street when Bishop Bernard Flanagan dedicated the new building. In September 1997, Holy Name Central Catholic High School added Grades 7 and 8.

In December 2019, the Archdiocese of Worcester announced that the school would close at the end of the academic year and merge with St. Peter-Marian, creating a new school, St. Paul Diocesan Junior/Senior High School, located on the site of Holy Name.

== Extracurricular activities ==
- Athletics: A top division 1 competitor in most sports, Holy Name won a boys' basketball state championship, several Super Bowls in American football, and had titles in cheerleading. Girls' and boys' basketball teams won many district championships as well as boys' and girls' soccer, baseball and softball. The school had several Gatorade Massachusetts players of the year.

== Green initiative ==
Holy Name was the first high school in the state of Massachusetts to be powered by a wind turbine after the 1984 installation of a 40 kilowatt turbine beside Hull High School, which was upgraded to 660 kilowatts in 2001. The 242-foot Holy Name turbine generated enough electricity for the entire school.

The project, four years in the making, began when the school president Mary Riordan, facing steep energy bills at the school, asked Worcester Polytechnic Institute students to study whether they could take advantage of the school's windy campus.

Later, the Sisters of Saint Anne, who founded the school, gave the school $50,000 to pay a consultant to research the details. The total project cost was $1.5 million.

== Notable alumni ==
- Emil Igwenagu, former fullback for the NFL
- Jarrett J. Krosoczka, author of "Lunch Lady" series
- Bryan LaHair, former MLB player (Seattle Mariners, Chicago Cubs, Cleveland Indians)
- Joseph Petty, Mayor of Worcester, Massachusetts
- Karyn Polito, 72nd Lieutenant Governor of Massachusetts
- Damien Sandow, WWE wrestler
- Neil Fingleton, actor and basketball player
- Nadia Eke, Olympian
