= Neil Fingleton =

English actor and basketball player

Personal information
- Born: 18 December 1980 Durham, County Durham, England
- Died: 25 February 2017 (aged 36) Durham, County Durham, England
- Listed height: 7 ft 7 in (2.31 m)
- Listed weight: 168 kg (370 lb)

Career information
- High school: Holy Name Central Catholic (Worcester, Massachusetts)
- College: North Carolina (2001–2002); Holy Cross (2002–2004)
- NBA draft: 2005: undrafted
- Playing career: 2004–2007
- Position: Center
- Number: 15

Career history
- 2004: Boston Frenzy
- 2005–2006: Tees Valley Mohawks
- 2006: CB Illescas
- 2006–2007: CB Ciudad Real

Career highlights
- Third-team Parade All-American (2000); McDonald's All-American (2000)

Neil Fingleton (18 December 1980 – 25 February 2017) was an English actor and basketball player. Neil became the tallest living British-born man and the tallest man in the European Union at 7 ft 7.56 in (232.6 cm) and among the 25 tallest men in the world.

This title has been confirmed by the Guinness World Records in the summer of 2007; Fingleton took over from Christopher Greener who stood at 7 ft 6 ¼ in (229.2 cm) in height.

== Life and career ==
Fingleton was born in Durham, England, in 1980, to mother Christine and father Michael. He had an older brother, Michael, and an older sister, Keely. Fingleton decided to attend high school in the United States after attending a basketball camp in Connecticut when he was 16. In 1997, Fingleton moved from Durham to Worcester, Massachusetts, and began attending Holy Name Central Catholic High School, graduating in 2000. Fingleton's coach was J. P. Ricciardi, who would later become general manager of the Toronto Blue Jays baseball team. Fingleton helped the Holy Name basketball team to the Central Massachusetts Division I title and a berth in the Massachusetts final game in 1999, and a 22–4 record in 2000.

Fingleton was awarded a basketball scholarship to the United States first playing at the University of North Carolina at Chapel Hill and later at the College of the Holy Cross in Worcester, Massachusetts. In August 2000, Fingleton had back surgery and then earned a medical redshirt from North Carolina. Fingleton played only one game with North Carolina then transferred to Holy Cross in 2002. Fingleton graduated from Holy Cross in 2004 with a degree in history.

Fingleton debuted professionally in the 2004–2005 season with the Boston Frenzy of the ABA. The Frenzy waived Fingleton in December 2004. In the 2005 NBA Development League Draft, the Austin Toros selected Fingleton as the eighth pick in the fifth round. On 6 December 2005, Fingleton started playing with the English Basketball League team Tees Valley Mohawks. In November 2006, Fingleton signed with Spanish team CB Illescas and later with Ciudad Real. After an injury forced him to retire in 2007, he returned to his home city of Durham to pursue a career in showbusiness.

On the Guinness World Records website, Fingleton says:

I am one of three siblings – my sister who is 6'3" is the eldest at 30, my brother is 6'8" who is 29 and I am 7'7" at 26 ... my mother is 6 foot and my father was also. My great grandfather was 6'8". I have always been taller than everyone since I can remember. My height really took off when I reached 11 and was touching 7 foot. By the time I was 16 I was 7'5" and stopping growing at 18 when I was 7'7.57.

I have never been self conscious about my height. I am more conscious of going bald so that should tell you. I never let my height play a negative part in my life. I always do what I want, some tall people may be restricted as they are constantly stared at or people ask the same questions over and over. This is the only bad thing about being tall – the stupid remarks and questions. Other than that, being tall is great.

I have been doing acting work since my basketball career finished. I spent eight years in the USA attending High School and College. I graduated from the College of the Holy Cross in 2004 with a degree in History. I have played professionally in Greece, Italy, Spain. Now I am concentrating on acting and trying to move to LA soon to jump in with both feet so to speak.

Two 2007 British TV documentaries, Britain's Tallest Men and Superhuman: Giants featured Fingleton and covered the difficulties and constant attention, quite often considerable rudeness, that he faces day to day.

He appeared in the film 47 Ronin, starring Keanu Reeves. From 2014 to 2017 Fingleton played the giant Mag the Mighty in the TV series Game of Thrones. He also appeared in the 2015 film Jupiter Ascending, starring Channing Tatum and Mila Kunis. He played Russian General's Bodyguard 1 in the Fox Studios film X-Men: First Class, and he provided the motion capture for the CGI character Ultron (which was voiced by James Spader) in the Marvel Studios film Avengers: Age of Ultron.

Fingleton appeared in a two-part serial written by Toby Whithouse for the 9th series of Doctor Who, filming in January 2015 in Cardiff. He played the villain "The Fisher King", an alien warlord. The series was transmitted in autumn 2015.

== Death ==
Fingleton died on 25 February 2017, at the age of 36, at his home in Gilesgate. The cause of death has been reported by British media as heart failure; however his brother says he died of pneumonia in the documentary Big Smooth. He is survived by his mother and his two siblings. His funeral was held at Durham Cathedral on 17 March.

== Filmography ==
Year	Title	Role	Notes
2011	X-Men: First Class	Russian General's Bodyguard #1	
2013	47 Ronin	Lovecraftian Samurai	
2014-2017	Game of Thrones	Giant Wight #2 / Mag the Mighty	
2015	Jupiter Ascending	Sargorn Fight Sequence	
2015	Avengers: Age of Ultron	Ultron	Motion capture only
2015	Doctor Who	The Fisher King	9th series

== See also ==
- Robert Bobroczkyi
- Sun Mingming
- List of tallest people

Preceded by Christopher Greener	Britain's tallest living man January 2007 – 25 February 2017	Succeeded by Paul Sturgess
