= Copa Catalunya Basketball =

- Sport: Basketball
- Founded: 1999
- CEO: Joan Fa Busquets
- No. of teams: 28
- Country: Spain
- Continent: (European Union) Europe
- Most recent champion: Maristes Ademar
- Broadcaster: La Xarxa
- Level on pyramid: 5
- Promotion to: Liga EBA
- Relegation to: CC 1ª Categoria
- Website: www.basquetcatala.cat (in Catalan)
- 2018-19 season

Copa Catalunya is the name given to the regional group of Catalonia in the Primera División de Baloncesto basketball championship, that is the fifth tier level in the Spanish basketball league system, after the Liga ACB, LEB Oro, LEB Plata and Liga EBA. It has been administered by the Catalan Basketball Federation since 1999 and is played under FIBA rules.

== Championship format ==
28 teams divided into two groups of 14, disputed a league. Each team has to play with all the other teams in its group twice, once at home and the other at the opponent's arena. Each victory adds two points to the team in the league ranking, while each loss adds only one. At the end of the league:

- The four best teams of the Regular season of each group advance to Fase Final.
- The winners of Quarter-Finales play Final Four. The Champion promotes to Liga EBA.
- The worst team in each group is relegated to CC 1ª Categoria.
- Teams qualified between ten and thirteen positions in each groups play the relegation play-offs, losers are relegated to CC 1ª Categoria.

At the half of the league, it will organize an All Star match, at its own discretion. The format of this match will be a selection of players from Group 01 and a selection of players from Group 02.

== Seasons ==
=== Copa Catalunya ===
All Copa Catalunya Seasons since 1999.

Season	Teams	Final Four Hosts	Champion	Runner-up	Third place	Fourth place
1999–00	16	League Format	CB Vic	CB Navàs		
2000–01	32	Cornellà de Llobregat	CB Cornellà B	CB Alella	CB Adepaf Figueres	CB Sant Boi
2001–02	32	Alella	CB Granollers	Maristes Ademar	CB Alella	BC Andorra
2002–03	32	Igualada	AD Torreforta	CB Igualada	BC Martorell	CB Grup Barna
2003–04	32	Granollers	CB Roser	UER Pineda de Mar	CB Sant Pere Terrassa	CB i Unió Manresana
2004–05	32	Andorra la Vella	BC Andorra	AB Esplugues	UB Sant Adrià	Maristes Ademar
2005–06	32	Ripollet	CB Ripollet	AE Sant Andreu de Natzaret	CN Sabadell	CB Adepaf Figueres
2006–07	32	Sant Feliu de Llobregat	CB Viladecans	CB Santfeliuenc	CB AESC-Ramon Llull	AE Sant Andreu de Natzaret
2007–08	32	La Seu d'Urgell	CB Mollet	AE Sedis Basquet	CB Vilaseca	CB Sant Josep Badalona
2008–09	32	Martorell	AE Sant Andreu de Natzaret	CB Vilaseca	AB Badalona 2005	BC Martorell
2009–10	32	Barberà del Vallès	UE Barberà	AB Badalona 2005	CB Castellbisbal	CB Viladecans
2010–11	32	Sitges	CB Sitges	CCR Collblanc-Torrassa	CB Viladecans	CB Sant Josep Badalona
2011–12	32	Badalona	SE Lluïsos de Gràcia	CB Sant Josep Badalona	CN Reus Ploms	UE Mataró
2012–13	32	Quart	CB Quart	UE Montgat	CB Pardinyes	CB Santa Coloma
2013–14	32	Martorell	BC Andorra B	CB Salt	JAC Sants	BC Martorell
2014–15	32	Mollet del Vallès	CB Igualada	CB Castellbisbal	CB Mollet	UE Barberà
2015–16	32	Sant Adrià de Besós	UB Sant Adrià	CB Sitges	CB Viladecans	CB Grup Barna
2016–17	28	Salou	AE Boet Mataró	CB Sant Josep Badalona	CB Vic	CB Roser
2017–18	28	Salou	CB Esparreguera	CB Salou	S.E.S.E.	FC Martinenc
2018–19	28	Calafell	Maristes Ademar	AE Badalonès	CB Roser	SE Lluïsos de Gràcia

=== Copa Federació ===
Season	Host	Champion	Result	Runner-up
2011-12	Martorell	CB Igualada	72 – 54	BC Martorell
2012-13	Barcelona	BC Martorell	90 – 67	CB Santa Coloma
2013-14	Castelldefels	BC Andorra B	62 – 51	Arenys Bàsquet
2014-15	Mataró	AE Boet Mataró	65 – 57	El Masnou Basquetbol
2015-16	Viladecans	UB Sant Adrià	90 – 69	CB Sant Josep Badalona

=== All Star ===
Season	Host	Champion	Result	Runner-up	MVP Game	Slam Dunk contest	3 points contest
2016-17	Cornellà de Llobregat	White Team; Group 1	78 – 75	Blue Team; Group 2	Alex López; CB Santa Coloma	Marquie Smith; AE Boet Mataró	Juli Garrote; CB Vic
2017-18	Sabadell	White Team; Group 1	92 – 70	Blue Team; Group 2	Rubén Morales; CB Esparreguera	Marquie Smith; CB Castellar^{1}	
2018-19	Manresa	Black Team; Group 2	94 – 91	Yellow Team; Group 1	Pedro Cuesta; AE Badalonès	Guillem Sánchez; CB Cerdanyola	

^{1} CB Castellar played CC 1ª Categoria, but the player was invited to participate.
