= CE Escola Pia Sabadell =

BasquetPiaSabadell
- Leagues: Copa Catalunya
- Founded: 1982
- Arena: Escola Pia Sabadell
- Location: Sabadell, Spain
- Team colors: Navy Blue and Orange
- President: Ramon Carrera Lluelles
- Website: www.basquetpiasabadell.cat
Home	Away

Club Esportiu Escola Pia Sabadell, also known as Basquet Pia, is an amateur basketball team based in Sabadell, Catalonia, Spain. The team was founded in 1982, inside the Escola Pia Sabadell, a school of Sabadell. They play in Copa Catalunya.

Best organization of Sabadell from the years 1985 and 1986 to the Dedication to School Sport

== Season by season ==
Season	Tier	Division	Pos.	W–L
2009–10	10	CT Senior B	8th	15-11
2010-11	10	CT Senior B	4th	21-7
2011–12	10	CT Senior B	4th	17-7
2012–13	10	CT Sots-25	3rd	22-6
2013–14	8	3ª Catalana	16th	2-28
2014–15	6	1ª Catalana	9th	14-16
2015–16	6	1ª Catalana	2nd	25-7
2016–17	5	Copa Catalunya	13th	8-21
2017–18	5	Copa Catalunya	9th	10-16
