= 2010–11 LEB Plata season =

- League: LEB Plata
- Sport: Basketball
- Games: 210 (regular season)
- Teams: 15

Regular Season
- Season champions: Knet Rioja
- Season MVP: (United States) Ian O'Leary
- Top scorer: (United States) Matt Witt

Play-offs

Copa LEB Plata
- Champions: Knet Rioja
- Runners-up: River Andorra
- Finals MVP: (Brazil) Sidão Santana

LEB Plata seasons
- ← 2009–10 2011–12 →

The 2010–11 LEB Plata season is the 11th season of the LEB Plata, second league of the Liga Española de Baloncesto and third division in Spain. It is also named Adecco Plata for sponsorship reasons.

== Competition format ==
15 teams play the regular season. This is a round robin, where each team will play twice against every rival. The champion of the Regular Season is promoted to the 2011-12 LEB Oro season and the eight next teams enter the play-offs, where the winner is promoted too.

The last qualified teams is relegated to 2011-12 Liga EBA.

=== Eligibility of players ===
All teams must have in their roster:

- A minimum of seven eligible players with the Spanish national team.
- A maximum of two non-EU players.
- A maximum of two EU players, which one can be a player from an ACP country.
- If a team has not two non-EU players, it can sign a player of everywhere.

Teams can not sign any player after February 28.

=== Regular season ===
Each team of every division has to play with all the other teams of its division twice, once at home and the other at the opponent's stadium. This means that in Liga LEB the league ends after every team plays 28 games. The regular season started on October 1, 2010, and finished on April 15, 2011.

Like many other leagues in continental Europe, the Liga LEB takes a winter break once each team has played half its schedule. One feature of the league that may be unusual to North American observers is that the two halves of the season are played in the same order—that is, the order of each team's first-half fixtures is repeated in the second half of the season, with the only difference being the arenas used. This procedure is typical in Europe; it is also used by La Liga in football.

If two or more teams have got the same number of winning games, the criteria of tie-breaking are these:

1. Head-to-head winning games.
2. Head-to-head points difference.
3. Total points difference.

At the final of the season:

- The regular season winner promotes directly to LEB Oro.
- Teams qualified between 2nd and 9th, joined the promotion playoffs to LEB Oro.

== Team information ==
Team	City	Arena	Founded	Coach
ADT Tarragona	Tarragona	Casal Esportiu Riu Clar-Torreforta	1983	(Spain) Mateo Rubio
Bàsquet Mallorca	Inca	Pabellón Municipal d'Inca	2009	(Spain) Xavi Sastre
River Andorra	Andorra La Vella	Poliesportiu d'Andorra	1970	(Spain) Joan Peñarroya
Knet Rioja	Logroño	Pabellón de los Deportes	1967	(Spain) Jesús Sala
Feve Oviedo	Oviedo	Polideportivo de Pumarín	2004	(Spain) Alfredo Riera
Prat Joventut	El Prat de Llobregat	Pavelló Joan Busquets	1951	(Spain) Carles Durán
Leyma Natura Basquet Coruña	A Coruña	Polideportivo de Riazor	1995	(Spain) Antonio Pérez
Santurtzi	Santurtzi	Polideportivo Municipal	1987	(Spain) Pepe Carrión
Lan Mobel ISB	Azpeitia	Polideportivo Municipal	1975	(Spain) Jon Txakartegi
Rayet Guadalajara	Guadalajara	Polideportivo San José	1972	(Spain) Román Peinado
CB Illescas	Illescas	Polideportivo Municipal	2001	(Spain) Sergio Jiménez
Plasencia Extremadura	Plasencia	Pabellón Ciudad de Plasencia	1978	(Spain) Rafael Gomáriz
Fontedoso Carrefour El Bulevar de Ávila	Ávila	Multiusos Carlos Sastre	2001	(Spain) Pablo Alonso
Promobys Tíjola	Tíjola	Pabellón Municipal	2000	(Spain) Antonio Herrera
Regal FC Barcelona B	Barcelona	Palau Blaugrana	1926	(Spain) Borja Comenge

== Regular season ==
=== Results ===
Results on FEB.es

=== League table ===
#	Teams	GP	W	L	PF	PA	PT	Qualification or relegation
1	Knet Rioja (C)	28	25	3	2437	2122	53	Promotion to LEB Oro
2	Bàsquet Mallorca	28	22	6	2307	2084	50	Promotion playoffs
3	Promobys Tíjola	28	19	9	2209	2133	47	Promotion playoffs
4	River Andorra	28	19	9	2203	1936	47	Promotion playoffs
5	CB Prat Joventut	28	17	11	2135	2006	45	Promotion playoffs
6	ADT Tarragona	28	15	13	2140	2119	43	Promotion playoffs
7	Plasencia Extremadura	28	15	13	2039	2054	43	Promotion playoffs
8	Feve Oviedo	28	13	15	2198	2232	41	Promotion playoffs
9	Fontedoso Carrefour El Bulevar de Ávila	28	12	16	2033	2095	40	Promotion playoffs
10	Regal FC Barcelona B	28	11	17	1873	2033	39	
11	Leyma Natura Básquet Coruña	28	9	19	1938	2153	37	
12	Santurtzi	28	9	19	2013	2179	37	
13	Rayet Guadalajara	28	8	20	2026	2127	36	
14	CB Illescas	28	8	20	1930	2054	36	
15	Lan Mobel ISB	28	8	20	2095	2249	36	Relegation to EBA

(C) indicates Copa LEB Plata champion.

=== Positions by round ===
Team\Round																														
	01	02	03	04	05	06	07	08	09	10	11	12	13	14	15	16	17	18	19	20	21	22	23	24	25	26	27	28	29	30
Knet Rioja	2	1	1	2	2	2	4*	3	2	2	1	1	1	1	1	1	1	1	1	1	1	1*	1	1	1	1	1	1	1	1
Bàsquet Mallorca	7	6	4	3	3	3*	5	4	3	4	4	4	3	3	3	3	3	3	3	3	3*	3	2	2	2	2	2	2	2	2
Promobys Tíjola	1	2	3	4	6*	6	3	2	1	1	3	2	4	4	5	5	5	4	4	4*	5	5	5	5	4	4	3	3	4	3
River Andorra	6	3	2	1	1	1	1	1	4*	3	2	3	2	2	2	2	2	2	2	2	2	2	3	3*	3	3	4	4	3	4
Prat Joventut	8	9	9	7	8	7	6	7	8	8	10*	10	8	9	7	7	7	7	7	7	6	6	6	6	6	6*	6	6	5	5
ADT Tarragona	4	5	8*	6	7	8	8	8	6	5	5	6	5	5	4	4	4	5*	6	6	7	7	7	7	7	7	7	7	7	6
Plasencia Extremadura	5	5	5	8	4	4	7	5	5	6	6	5	6	6	6*	6	6	6	5	5	4	4	4	4	5	5	5	5	6	7*
Feve Oviedo	9	7	6	5	5	5	2	6*	7	7	8	8	9	7	8	8	12	8	8	8	8	8	8*	10	9	8	8	8	8	8
Fontedoso Carrefour El Bulevar de Ávila	15*	14	15	15	15	15	15	15	15	14	13	12	10	8	10	12*	8	10	9	10	11	9	10	9	8	10	10	9	9	9
Regal FC Barcelona B	3	8	7	9*	9	11	9	10	9	10	9	9	11	12	13	11	9	9	10*	11	12	10	9	8	10	9	9	10	10	10
Leyma Natura Básquet Coruña	14	12	12	13	14	14	14	12	14	11	12	15*	14	14	15	13	13	12	12	14	14	12	12	13	12	11	12*	12	11	11
Santurtzi	11	10	11	12	11	12	11	9	10	9	7	7	7	11*	9	9	11	13	13	9	10	13	13	14	13	13	11	11	12*	12
Rayet Guadalajara	10	15*	14	14	13	10	12	13	11	12	11	11	12	10	11	14	14*	14	15	15	15	15	14	15	14	14	14	13	15	13
CB Illescas	12	11	10	11	10	9	10	11	12	13	15	14	15*	15	14	15	15	15	14	12	9	11	11	11	11	12	13	14*	14	14
Lan Mobel Iraurgi	13	13	13	10	12	13	13	14	13	15*	14	13	13	13	12	10	10	11	11	13	13	14	15	12	15*	15	15	15	13	15

- Cells with "*" indicate the team didn't play that day.
- The positions are calculated using the rank system of the Spanish Basketball Federation, giving 2 points to the winner and 1 point to the loser of any game.

== Copa LEB Plata ==
At the half of the league, the two first teams in the table play the Copa LEB Plata at home of the winner of the first half season. The Champion of this Cup will play the play-offs as first qualified if finishes the league between the 2nd and the 5th qualified. The Copa LEB Plata will be played on January 29, 2011.

=== Teams qualified ===
#	Teams	P	W	L	PF	PA	PT
1	Knet Rioja	14	12	2	1206	1072	26
2	River Andorra	14	11	3	1106	958	25

=== Copa LEB Plata Final ===
29 Jan 2011
20:00 CET

Report
Stats

Knet Rioja	79–72	River Andorra
Scoring by quarter: 21-19, 18-25, 17-17, 23-11
Pts: David Mesa and Enrique Suárez, 12; Rebs: Sidão Santana, 8 Asts: Matt Witt, 5 Eff: Sidão Santana, 16		Pts: Àlex Ros, 21; Rebs: Robert Johnson, 10; Asts: Néstor Zamora, 5 Eff: Robert Johnson, 19
Knet Rioja, champion of the XI Copa LEB Plata

Palacio de los Deportes de La Rioja, Logroño
Attendance: 3,500
Referees: Caballero, Fernández Sánchez, Manuel

== Playoffs ==
Teams qualified from 2nd to 9th will play the promotion play-off. If the winner of Copa LEB Plata is qualified between 2nd and 5th at the final of the Regular Season, it will join the play-offs as 2nd qualified. Three best-of-five series will decide who promotes to LEB Oro.

Quarterfinals; April 29 and May 1, 4, 6 and 8
2	Bàsquet Mallorca	80	69	91	90	X
9	Fontedoso Ávila	72	70	59	77	X
5	CB Prat Joventut	68	65	71	63	X
6	ADT Tarragona	69	69	56	66	X
3	Promobys Tíjola	83	86	75	76	X
8	Feve Oviedo	71	73	76	65	X
4	River Andorra	62	81	64	X	X
7	Plasencia Extrem.	54	79	58	X	X

Semifinals; May 13, 15, 18, 20 and 22
2	Bàsquet Mallorca	88	89	68	78	74
6	ADT Tarragona	81	78	82	82	68
3	Promobys Tíjola	77	62	69	84	61
4	River Andorra	62	85	67	86	72

Finals; May 27, 29 and June 1, 3 and 5
2	Bàsquet Mallorca	92	82	74	86	67
4	River Andorra	83	86	87	80	66

== Stats leaders in regular season ==
=== MVP week by week ===
Day	Name	Team	PIR
1	(Spain) David Mesa	Knet Rioja	38
2	(Spain) Carles Bivià	Bàsquet Mallorca	28
3	(Spain) Iván García	Regal FC Barcelona B	31
4	(United States) Kevin Ratzsch (United States) Tony Tate	Feve Oviedo	28
5	(Spain) Jonathan Barceló	Plasencia Extremadura	32
6	(Spain) Javi Román	Feve Oviedo	37
7	(United States) Ian O'Leary (Spain) Roberto Rueda	Feve Oviedo; Plasencia Extremadura	30
8	(Brazil) Sidão Santana	Knet Rioja	38
9	(United States) Chris Mortellaro	Lan Mobel ISB	45
10	(Montenegro) Marko Todorović	CB Prat Joventut	33
11	(Spain) Carles Bivià	Bàsquet Mallorca	34
12	(Democratic Republic of the Congo) Bismack Biyombo	CB Illescas	35
13	(Spain) Añaterve Cruz	Leyma Natura Básquet Coruña	30
14	(United States) Kevin Ratzsch	Feve Oviedo	39
15	(Spain) Carles Bivià	Bàsquet Mallorca	36
16	(Spain) Jonathan Barceló	Plasencia Extremadura	30
17	(Spain) David Mesa (United States) Ian O'Leary (United States) David Reichel	Knet Rioja; Feve Oviedo; Santurtzi	28
18	(United States) Charles Ramsdell	Fontedoso Carrefour El Bulevar de Ávila	35
19	(Spain) Víctor Hidalgo	Leyma Natura Básquet Coruña	26
20	(Spain) Héctor García	CB Illescas	36
21	(Spain) Jonathan Barceló (Spain) Xavi Guirao	Plasencia Extremadura; ADT Tarragona	27
22	(Spain) Marcos Casado (United States) Shaun Green	Santurtzi; Bàsquet Mallorca	24
23	(Israel) Alexey Chubrevich	CB Illescas	40
24	(United States) Charles Ramsdell	Fontedoso Carrefour El Bulevar de Ávila	42
25	(United States) Charles Ramsdell	Fontedoso Carrefour El Bulevar de Ávila	30
26	(United States) Ian O'Leary	Feve Oviedo	29
27	(United States) Ian O'Leary	Feve Oviedo	42
28	(United States) Ian O'Leary	Feve Oviedo	31
29	(Spain) Quique Suárez	Knet Rioja	28
30	(United States) Ian O'Leary	Feve Oviedo	34

== Honors ==
=== All LEB Plata team ===
- (Spain) Carles Bivià (Bàsquet Mallorca)
- (Spain) Mikel Uriz (Santurtzi)
- (Spain) Jonathan Barceló (Plasencia Extremadura)
- (Spain) David Mesa (Knet Rioja)
- (United States) Ian O'Leary (Feve Oviedo)

=== MVP of the regular season ===
- (United States) Ian O'Leary (Feve Oviedo)

=== Coach of the season ===
- (Spain) Jesús Sala (Knet Rioja)
