= CB Illescas =

Spanish basketball team

CB Ilarcuris
- Leagues: Primera División
- Founded: 1989
- Dissolved: 2011
- History: CB Illescas (1989–2011)
- Arena: Pabellón Municipal
- Location: Illescas, Castile-La Mancha
- Team colors: Navy and orange
- President: José María Cabrera
- Website: Official website
Home	Away

Club Baloncesto Illescas, was a Spanish basketball team based in Illescas, Castile-La Mancha.

== History ==
The original CB Illescas, founded in 1989, has got the record of six consecutive promotions from the lowest regional division in 2002–03 to LEB Oro, division where the team played in the 2008–09 season.

The club was also famous because in 2006–07 was signed Neil Fingleton, the tallest British-born man with 232 cm. The British center only played six games with CB Illescas.

In July 2011, Baloncesto Fuenlabrada announced their farm team compete in Liga EBA but out of Illescas. to playing in regional divisions.

After that, the town of Illescas decided to create a new team called CB Ilarcuris started to compete in the sixth division (Primera Autonómica), promoting in its first year to the Primera División. After its second season, the senior team did not enter any competition.

== Season by season ==
Season	Tier	Division	Pos.	W–L	Cup competitions	
2002–03	8	3ª Autonómica	1st			
2003–04	7	2ª Autonómica	1st	21–5		
2004–05	6	1ª Autonómica	1st	27–3		
2005–06	5	1ª División	1st	21–5		
2006–07	4	Liga EBA	1st	27–4		
2007–08	3	LEB Plata	2nd	28–10	Copa LEB Plata	RU
2008–09	2	LEB Oro	17th	8–26		
2009–10	3	LEB Plata	13th	10–20		
2010–11	3	LEB Plata	14th	8–20		

== Notable players ==
- (United Kingdom) Neil Fingleton
- (Mexico) Gustavo Ayón
- (Democratic Republic of the Congo) Bismack Biyombo
