= Vista Pirineu =

- Singular population entity
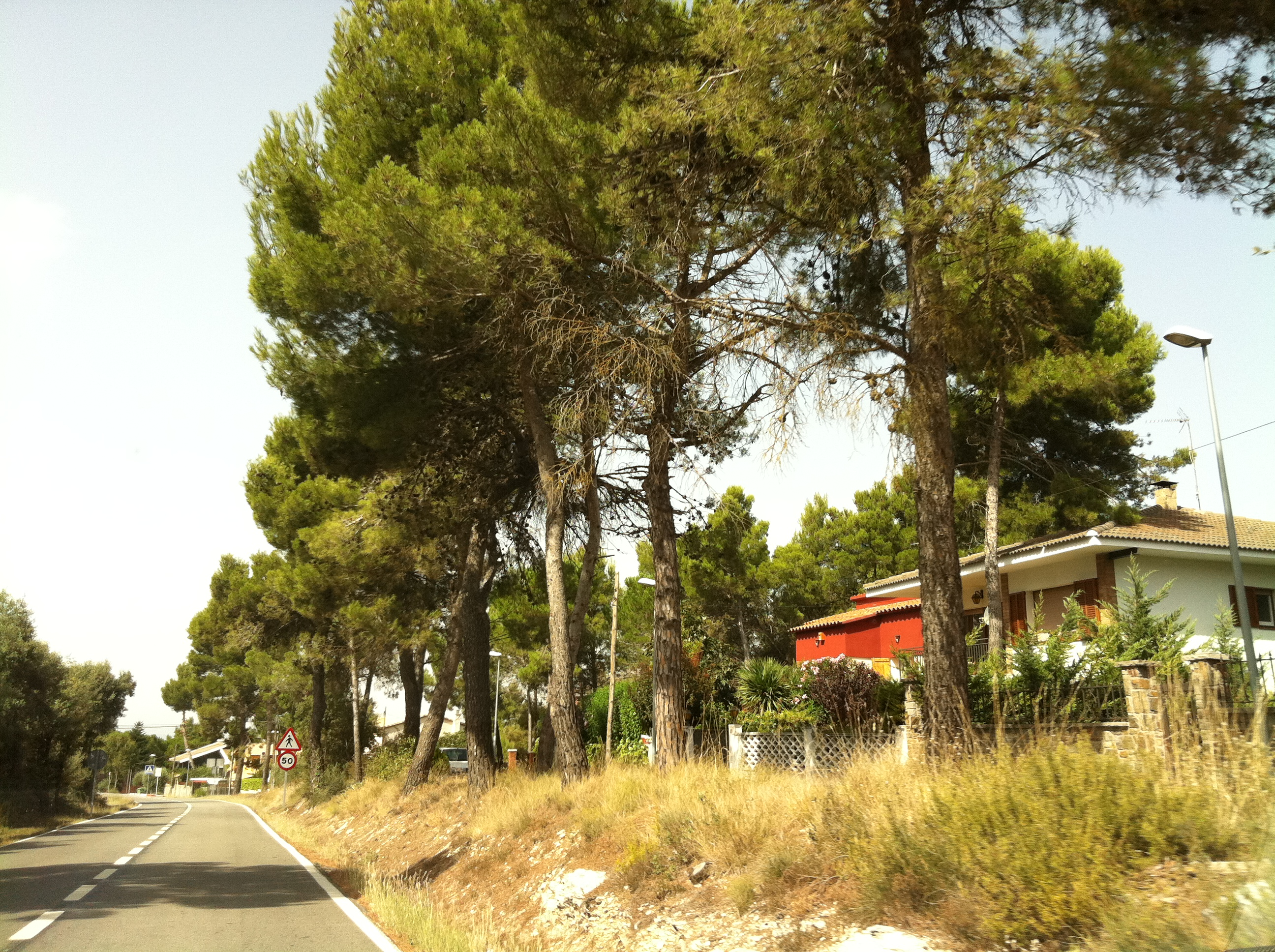

- Location within Spain Location within Catalonia Location within Province of Barcelona
- Coordinates: 41°47′24.8″N 1°58′20.2″E
- Country: Spain
- A. community: Catalunya
- Province: Barcelona
- Municipality: Artés

Population (January 1, 2024)
  - Total: 108
- Time zone: UTC+01:00
- Postal code: 08271
- MCN: 08010000200

Vista Pirineu is a singular population entity in the municipality of Artés, in Catalonia, Spain.

As of 2024 it has a population of 108 people.
