= 2007–08 LEB Plata season =

- League: LEB Plata
- Sport: Basketball
- Number of games: 306 (regular season)
- Number of teams: 18

Regular Season
- Season champions: Akasvayu Vic
- Season MVP: (United States) Stevie Johnson

Play-offs
- Play-offs champions: Illescas Urban CLM
- Play-offs runners-up: Farho Gijón

LEB Plata seasons
- ← 2006–07 2008–09 →

The 2007–08 LEB Plata season was the 8th season of the LEB Plata, second league of the Liga Española de Baloncesto and third division in Spain. It is also named Adecco Plata for sponsorship reasons.

== Competition format ==
18 teams play the regular season. This is a round robin, where each team will play twice against every rival. The champion of the Regular Season is promoted to LEB Oro and the eight next teams join the play-offs. A best-of-three quarterfinal and a Final Four decided the second promoted team.

The last two qualified teams were relegated to LEB Bronce.

If two or more teams have got the same number of winning games, the criteria of tie-breaking are these:

1. Head-to-head winning games.
2. Head-to-head points difference.
3. Total points difference.

== Regular season ==
=== League table ===
#	Teams	GP	W	L	PF	PA	PT	Qualification or relegation
1	Akasvayu Vic	34	27	7	2553	2311	61	Promotion to LEB Oro
2	Illescas Urban CLM	34	24	10	2652	2509	58	Promotion playoffs
3	Clínicas Rincón Axarquía	34	24	10	2607	2374	58	Promotion playoffs
4	CajaRioja	34	23	11	2640	2476	57	Promotion playoffs
5	Calefacciones Farho Gijón	34	23	11	2690	2590	57	Promotion playoffs
6	Deportes Blanes BS Almería	34	21	13	2645	2503	55	Promotion playoffs
7	Cáceres 2016	34	20	14	2674	2596	54	Promotion playoffs
8	CAI Huesca Cosarsa	34	19	15	2582	2457	53	Promotion playoffs
9	Plasencia Extremadura	34	17	17	2689	2689	51	Promotion playoffs
10	Tarragona 2016	34	17	17	2655	2538	51	
11	Qalat Cajasol	34	14	20	2631	2789	48	
12	Bàsquet Muro	34	14	20	2631	2789	48	
13	Alimentos de Palencia	34	12	22	2493	2619	46	
14	Ourense Grupo Juanes	34	12	22	2398	2549	46	
15	WTC Cornellà	34	11	23	2347	2633	45	
16	CB Prat Joventut	34	11	23	2353	2576	45	
17	Imaje Sabadell Gapsa	34	9	25	2353	2576	43	Relegation to LEB Bronce
18	Costa Urbana Playas de Santa Pola	34	8	26	2459	2642	42	Relegation to LEB Bronce

== Playoffs ==
Teams qualified from 2nd to 9th will play the promotion play-off. If the winner of Copa LEB Plata is qualified between 2nd and 5th at the final of the Regular Season, it will join the play-offs as 2nd qualified. A best-of-three series and a Final Four hosted at Cáceres (with re-seeding) decided who promotes to LEB Oro.

Quarterfinals
2	Illescas Urban CLM	2
9	Plasencia Extremadura	0
3	CajaRioja	0
8	Cáceres 2016	2
(Pairings are reseeded after the first round)
4	Clínicas Rincón	2
7	CAI Huesca	1
5	Farho Gijón	2
6	Blanes BS Almería	0

Semifinals
2	Illescas Urban CLM	80
8	Cáceres 2016	75
4	Clínicas Rincón	79
5	Farho Gijón	84

Finals
2	Illescas Urban CLM	78
5	Farho Gijón	68

== MVP of the regular season ==
- (United States) Stevie Johnson (Alimentos de Palencia)
