= 2009–10 LEB Plata season =

- League: LEB Plata
- Sport: Basketball
- Teams: 23

Regular Season
- Season champions: Fundación Adepal Alcázar
- Season MVP: (United States) Ronald Thompson

Play-offs
- Play-offs champions: Lobe Huesca
- Play-offs runners-up: Promobys BS Tíjola

Copa LEB Plata
- Champions: Lobe Huesca
- Runners-up: Huelva La Luz
- Finals MVP: (United States) Stevie Johnson

LEB Plata seasons
- 2008–09 2010–11

The 2009–10 LEB Plata season was the 10th season of the LEB Plata, second league of the Liga Española de Baloncesto and third division in Spain. It was also named Adecco Plata for sponsorship reasons.

== Competition format ==
21 teams were divided in the first round in two groups of 12 and 11 teams. The six first qualified teams of each group will join the Group 1. In this Group 1, the winner will be promoted directly to LEB Oro. Teams from 2nd to 8th will join the promotion playoffs with the winner of the Group 2 (played with the remaining teams). The Group B winner will be the last seeded team in the playoffs. The results of the games of the first round between teams of the same group were included in the table for the second round.

The last qualified of the Group 2 was relegated to Liga EBA.

The leading teams of the first half of Groups A and B, played the Copa LEB Plata. The winner of this Cup, was the first seeded team in the promotion playoffs if it finished between the second and the fifth position of the Group 1 of the second round.

=== Eligibility of players ===
All teams must have in their roster:

- A minimum of seven eligible players with the Spanish national team.
- A maximum of two non-EU players.
- A maximum of two EU players, which one can be a player from an ACP country.
- If a team has not two non-EU players, it can sign a player of everywhere.

Teams can not sign any player after February 28.

== Regular season ==
=== First round ===
==== Group A ====
| # | Teams | GP | W | L | PF | PA | PT | Qualification |
|---|---|---|---|---|---|---|---|---|
| 1 | Lobe Huesca (C) | 20 | 15 | 5 | 1725 | 1596 | 35 | Group 1 |
| 2 | CajaRioja | 20 | 14 | 6 | 1636 | 1411 | 34 | Group 1 |
| 3 | River Andorra | 20 | 13 | 7 | 1560 | 1460 | 33 | Group 1 |
| 4 | Leyma Básquet Coruña | 20 | 12 | 8 | 1478 | 1429 | 32 | Group 1 |
| 5 | CB Prat Joventut | 20 | 10 | 10 | 1483 | 1491 | 30 | Group 1 |
| 6 | Grupo Iruña Navarra | 20 | 10 | 10 | 1506 | 1418 | 30 | Group 1 |
| 7 | Santurtzi | 20 | 9 | 11 | 1457 | 1610 | 29 | Group 2 |
| 8 | ADT Tarragona | 20 | 7 | 13 | 1467 | 1572 | 27 | Group 2 |
| 9 | Alaior Menorcarentals.com Coinga | 20 | 7 | 13 | 1422 | 1478 | 27 | Group 2 |
| 10 | Beirasar Rosalía | 20 | 7 | 13 | 1392 | 1492 | 27 | Group 2 |
| 11 | Torrons Vicens L'Hospitalet | 20 | 6 | 14 | 1368 | 1537 | 26 | Group 2 |

==== Group B ====
| # | Teams | GP | W | L | PF | PA | PT | Qualification |
|---|---|---|---|---|---|---|---|---|
| 1 | Promobys BS Hoteles Tíjola | 18 | 13 | 5 | 1453 | 1333 | 31 | Group 1 |
| 2 | Huelva La Luz | 18 | 12 | 6 | 1339 | 1264 | 30 | Group 1 |
| 3 | Fundación Adepal Alcázar | 18 | 11 | 7 | 1354 | 1270 | 29 | Group 1 |
| 4 | Plasencia Extremadura | 18 | 9 | 9 | 1350 | 1320 | 27 | Group 1 |
| 5 | CB Guadalajara | 18 | 9 | 9 | 1415 | 1409 | 27 | Group 1 |
| 6 | CB Illescas | 18 | 9 | 9 | 1355 | 1358 | 27 | Group 1 |
| 7 | Real Madrid B | 18 | 8 | 10 | 1270 | 1278 | 26 | Group 2 |
| 8 | Fontedoso Carrefour El Bulevar de Ávila | 18 | 7 | 11 | 1322 | 1416 | 25 | Group 2 |
| 9 | Qalat Cajasol | 18 | 7 | 11 | 1322 | 1426 | 25 | Group 2 |
| 10 | Cajasol Córdoba 2016 | 18 | 5 | 13 | 1304 | 1410 | 23 | Group 2 |

=== Second round ===
==== Group 1 ====
| # | Teams | GP | W | L | PF | PA | PT | Qualification |
|---|---|---|---|---|---|---|---|---|
| 1 | Fundación Adepal Alcázar | 22 | 17 | 5 | 1725 | 1615 | 39 | Promotion to LEB Oro |
| 2 | Promobys BS Hoteles Tíjola | 22 | 17 | 5 | 1783 | 1593 | 39 | Promotion playoffs |
| 3 | Lobe Huesca (C) | 22 | 15 | 7 | 1906 | 1751 | 37 | Promotion playoffs |
| 4 | Grupo Iruña Navarra | 22 | 12 | 10 | 1626 | 1576 | 34 | Promotion playoffs |
| 5 | River Andorra | 22 | 11 | 11 | 1671 | 1681 | 34 | Promotion playoffs |
| 6 | CajaRioja | 22 | 11 | 11 | 1703 | 1702 | 34 | Promotion playoffs |
| 7 | Plasencia Extremadura | 22 | 11 | 11 | 1553 | 1580 | 34 | Promotion playoffs |
| 8 | Huelva La Luz | 22 | 10 | 12 | 1631 | 1614 | 32 | Promotion playoffs |
| 9 | Leyma Básquet Coruña | 22 | 8 | 14 | 1576 | 1694 | 30 | |
| 10 | CB Prat Joventut | 22 | 8 | 14 | 1579 | 1656 | 30 | |
| 11 | CB Guadalajara | 22 | 7 | 15 | 1630 | 1798 | 29 | |
| 12 | CB Illescas | 22 | 5 | 17 | 1647 | 1770 | 27 | |

==== Group B ====
| # | Teams | GP | W | L | PF | PA | PT | Qualification or relegation |
|---|---|---|---|---|---|---|---|---|
| 1 | Alaior Menorcarentals.com Coinga | 16 | 10 | 6 | 1209 | 1156 | 26 | Promotion playoffs |
| 2 | CB Santurtzi | 16 | 10 | 6 | 1199 | 1192 | 26 | |
| 3 | Beirasar Rosalía | 16 | 10 | 6 | 1224 | 1188 | 26 | |
| 4 | Real Madrid B | 16 | 8 | 8 | 1199 | 1165 | 24 | |
| 5 | Torrons Vicens L'Hospitalet | 16 | 8 | 8 | 1128 | 1162 | 24 | |
| 6 | Fontedoso Carrefour El Bulevar | 16 | 8 | 8 | 1154 | 1181 | 24 | |
| 7 | Qalat Cajasol | 16 | 7 | 9 | 1206 | 1206 | 23 | |
| 8 | ADT Tarragona | 16 | 7 | 9 | 1183 | 1201 | 23 | |
| 9 | Cajasol Córdoba 2016 | 16 | 4 | 12 | 1212 | 1263 | 20 | Relegated to Liga EBA |

== Copa LEB Plata ==
At the half of the first round, the two first teams in the table play the Copa LEB Plata at home of the winner of the first half season. The Champion of this Cup will play the play-offs as first qualified if finishes the league between the 2nd and the 5th qualified of the Group 1.

Lobe Huesca was the champion after defeating Huelva La Luz by 89–67.

== Playoffs ==
Teams qualified from 2nd to 8th of the Group 1 and the winner of the Group 2 will play the promotion play-off. If the winner of Copa LEB Plata is qualified between 2nd and 5th at the final of the Regular Season, it will join the play-offs as 2nd qualified. Three best-of-five series will decide who promotes to LEB Oro with the champion of the league.

Quarterfinals
C | Lobe Huesca | 102 | 89 | 81 | 95 | X
W2 | Alaior MR Coinga | 84 | 84 | 93 | 71 | X
5 | River Andorra | 82 | 66 | 81 | 77 | X
6 | CajaRioja | 76 | 68 | 90 | 82 | X
2 | Promobys BS Tíjola | 65 | 94 | 69 | 84 | 90
8 | Huelva La Luz | 66 | 71 | 85 | 73 | 80
4 | Grupo Iruña Navarra | 79 | 69 | 59 | 62 | X
7 | Plasencia Extrem. | 67 | 67 | 83 | 56 | X

Semifinals
C | Lobe Huesca | 77 | 72 | 94 | 81 | 80
6 | CajaRioja | 76 | 70 | 96 | 89 | 80
2 | Promobys BS Tíjola | 77 | 69 | 69 | 78 | X
4 | Grupo Iruña Navarra | 68 | 62 | 79 | 77 | X

Finals
C | Lobe Huesca | 93 | 88 | 84 | 82 | X
2 | Promobys BS Tíjola | 77 | 75 | 91 | 80 | X

== Final standings ==
| Pos | Team |
|---|---|
| 1 | Fundación Adepal Alcázar |
| 2 | Lobe Huesca |
| 3 | Promobys BS Hoteles Tíjola |
| 4 | Grupo Iruña Navarra |
| 5 | CajaRioja |
| 6 | River Andorra |
| 7 | Plasencia Extremadura |

| Pos | Team |
|---|---|
| 8 | Huelva La Luz |
| 9 | Alaior Menorcarentals.com Coinga |
| 10 | Leyma Básquet Coruña |
| 11 | CB Prat Joventut |
| 12 | CB Guadalajara |
| 13 | CB Illescas |
| 14 | Santurtzi |

| Pos | Team |
|---|---|
| 15 | Beirasar Rosalía |
| 16 | Real Madrid B |
| 17 | Torrons Vicens L'Hospitalet |
| 18 | Fontedoso Carrefour El Bulevar de Ávila |
| 19 | Qalat Cajasol |
| 20 | ADT Tarragona |
| 21 | Cajasol Córdoba 2016 |

== MVP of the regular season ==
- (United States) Ronald Thompson (ADT Tarragona)
