= Ramón Abad =

Catalonian politician

Ramón Abad Gimeno is a politician of the Catalan Alliance. He was one of two of their members elected to the Parliament of Catalonia in the 2024 Catalan regional election.

Abad was born in Mollerussa and resident in Alpicat, both in the Province of Lleida. He studied history and geography at the University of Barcelona. Retired after working at a bank, he was a pensioner at the time of his election.

Abad had been a grassroots member of the Republican Left of Catalonia (ERC) in the 2010s and had been active in the Catalan Alliance for 18 months before being named the lead candidate in the Lleida constituency for the 2024 Catalan regional election. On 1 October that year, he announced his resignation due to health issues, and was succeeded by the next name on the party list in Lleida, Rosa Maria Soberana.

Abad is married. He is a fan of motorcycles and FC Barcelona.
