= Esparreguera Passion Play =

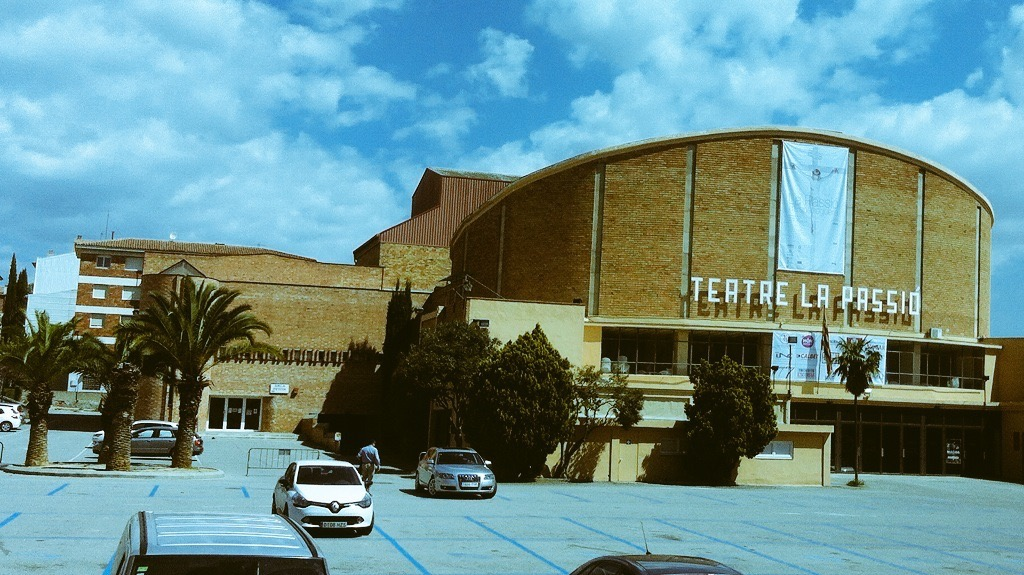
Teatre de la Passió

The Esparreguera Passion Play (Catalan: Passió d'Esparreguera) is a performance of the Passion Play in Esparreguera, Catalonia, Spain. The play has over three hundred actors and live music, and is performed in twelve performances, staged every Sunday from March to May.

The townspeople of Esparreguera, a town northwest of Barcelona, get involved every year to carry out the festival. The performances take place at the Teatre de la Passió, a large theater venue opened in 1969 and designed specifically for Passion Play performances. Along with the Olesa Passion, it is one of the most important Passion Plays in Catalonia.

== Origins ==
The Counter-Reformation, initiated by the Catholic Church after the Council of Trent (1545–1563) in response to the Protestant Reformation, resulted in widespread performances of the sacred drama, performed on the street by unions, guilds and rural communities. Starting in the seventeenth century, numerous different texts proliferated, with all versions more or less following the traditional line. Ecclesiastical authorities managed to bring them together into a more cleaned-up and unified version, in a text attributed to Fray Antoni de San Jerónimo, published in Vic in 1773. In reality the vic script essentially compiled all of the different versions extant at the time. This version was performed in Esparreguera until the 1940s.

The earliest performances of the Esparreguera Passion Play took place in the early seventeenth century (1611), and were performed outside in the streets as the natural setting in which to represent the events of Christ's Passion. These street performances continued until the middle of the nineteenth century, when they moved indoors and the performances were put on in a variety of public or private venues, and the whole production was redesigned as a classical theatrical play in two parts, with the first part, performed in the morning, depicting the three years of Jesus' public life, and the second part, in the afternoon, showing his passion, death and resurrection.

After World War 2, the townspeople began to consider replacing the earlier text, and began using other versions in 1944-1951, and 1952-1959. Local poet Ramon Torruella wrote the version performed today, ever since its 1960 premiere. Divided into the traditional two parts, it consists of 35 scenes in four acts.

== Production ==
With some schedule variation over the centuries, the Esparreguera Passion has been performed every Sunday and holiday, and on some Saturdays from the beginning of Lent until the first week of May, except for Palm Sunday, Good Friday and Easter Monday when there is no performance. It is more than just a theatrical celebration of the passion, death and resurrection of Christ. It is a large-scale theatrical show, performed with a high level of technical production quality, but it is also the staging of a secular tradition in the town, which is an intense experience for the many of actors and extras who take part, all of whom are amateurs. Counting those backstage and others who help out with organization and production, this amounts to around a thousand people. In many cases, participation is a family tradition passed down the generations; many actors began participating as extras and ended up in more and more important roles. Others may never have participated on stage, but they are nevertheless involved in the festival through supporting roles in scenery, backstage operations, stunts, lighting, or other support roles.

== Topic in Catalan literature ==
Author Tomàs Roig i Llop writes in his autobiography about visiting Esparreguera in 1956 for a conference. While there, he met the librarian of the town, Aurelia Sabanés de Balaguér, who mentioned to him that she had some notes about the Passion Play. Roig knew an editor who he thought might be interested in a book about the Esparreguera Passion Play, and suggested that she turn her notes into a book. She did, coming out with her book the following year, written in collaboration with Roig.

== See also ==
- Catalonia
- Catholicism in Spain
- Holy Week in Spain
- Holy Week procession
- Oral literature
