= AE Badalonès =

Badalonès-Fruits Secs Corbera
- Nickname: Dimonis
- Leagues: Copa Catalunya
- Founded: 1990
- Arena: Pavello La Plana
- Location: Badalona, Spain
- Team colors: Red and White
- President: Manel Dunjo Coscollano
- Website: www.aebadalones.com
Home	Away

Associació Esportiva Badalonès, also known as Badalonès-Fruits Secs Corbera for sponsorship reasons, is an amateur basketball team based in Badalona, Catalonia, Spain. The team was founded in 1990, inside the Col·legi Badalonès, a school of Badalona. They play in Copa Catalunya

== Season by season ==
Season	Tier	Division	Pos.	W–L
2008–09	9	3ª Catalana	14th	10–22
2009–10	8	3ª Catalana	2nd	24–6
2010-11	7	2ª Catalana	12th	12–18
2011-12	7	2ª Catalana	10th	13–17
2012–13	7	2ª Catalana	4th	23–7
2013-14	6	1ª Catalana	7th	17–13
2014–15	6	1ª Catalana	7th	16–14
2015–16	6	1ª Catalana	1st	24–8
2016–17	5	Copa Catalunya	9th	10–16
2017–18	5	Copa Catalunya	5th	17–9
