= CN Sabadell Basketball =

Club Natació Sabadell
- Leagues: CC 1ª Categoria
- Founded: 1929
- Arena: Pavello Les Naus
- Location: Sabadell, Catalonia, Spain
- Team colors: Navy Blue and White
- President: Claudi Marti Mortes
- Website: www.nataciosabadell.com/seccions/basquet/
Home	Away

Club Natació Sabadell Basketball, also known as CN Sabadell, is an amateur basketball team based in Sabadell, Catalonia, Spain. The team was founded in 1929, as a division of the CN Sabadell multi sports club. They play in Copa Catalunya

== Season by season ==
Season	Tier	Division	Pos.	W–L
2008–09	7	1ª Catalana	9th	15–13
2009–10	6	1ª Catalana	11th	14–18
2010-11	6	1ª Catalana	9th	15–15
2011–12	4	Liga EBA	10th	13–15
2012–13	4	Liga EBA	11th	13–15
2013–14	4	Liga EBA	11th	5–15
2014–15	5	Copa Catalunya	13th	12–21
2015–16	6	1ª Catalana	1st	27–6
2016–17	5	Copa Catalunya	10th	12–17
2017–18	5	Copa Catalunya	14th	6–20
