= AD Torreforta =

Associacio Deportiva Torreforta
- Nickname: ADT
- Leagues: CC 1ª Categoria
- Founded: 1983
- Arena: Casal Esportiu Riu Clar-Torreforta
- Location: Tarragona, Spain
- Team colors: black, yellow
- President: Robert Hernández
- Website: www.adtorreforta.com
Home	Away

Associació Deportiva Torreforta, also known as AD Torreforta, is an amateur Basketball team based in Tarragona, Catalonia, Spain.

== Season by season ==
Season	Tier	Division	Pos.	W–L
2000–01	5	Copa Catalunya	4th	28–4
2001–02	5	Copa Catalunya	6th	19–11
2002–03	5	Copa Catalunya	1st	25–7
2003–04	4	Liga EBA	15th (Note: Remained in the league.)	9–21
2004–05	4	Liga EBA	5th	17–13
2005–06	4	Liga EBA	5th	17–13
2006–07	4	Liga EBA	2nd (Note: Invited to the newly created LEB Bronce league.)	18–10
2007–08	4	LEB Bronce	17th (Note: Remained in the league after achieving a vacant place.)	9–23
2008–09	4	LEB Bronce	8th (Note: Invited to LEB Plata after the dissolution of the LEB Bronce.)	16–18
2009–10	3	LEB Plata	20th	10–18
2010–11	3	LEB Plata	5th (Note: Resigned to its place in LEB Plata.)	20–17
2011–12	8	3ª Catalana	13th	0–24
2012–13	8	3ª Catalana	6th	19–11
2013–14	7	2ª Catalana	10th	14–16
2014–15	6	1ª Catalana	15th	4–26
2015–16	7	2ª Catalana	6th	15–15
2016–17	5	Copa Catalunya	9th	12–14
2017–18	5	Copa Catalunya	13th	9-20
2018-19	6	1ª Catalana	12th	6-16
2019-20				
2020-21				
2021-22		Copa Catalunya		
2022-23		1ª Catalana		
2023-24		2ª Catalana		
2024-25	1	1ª Territorial	1st	22-4

== Trophies and awards ==
=== Individual awards ===
LEB Plata MVP

- Ronald Thompson – 2010
