= Esparreguera =

- Municipality
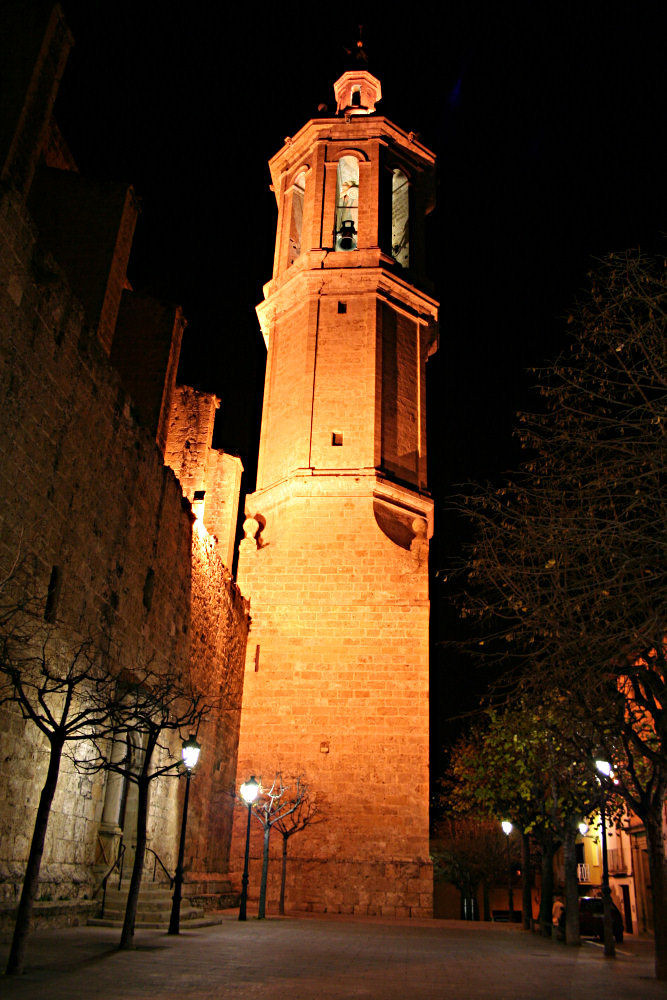
- Bell tower of the Santa Eulàlia church.

- Flag Coat of arms

- Location in Catalonia Esparreguera (Spain)
- Coordinates: 41°32′17″N 1°52′09″E
- Country: Spain
- Community: Catalonia
- Province: Barcelona
- Comarca: Baix Llobregat

Government
  - Mayor: Eduard Rivas Mateo (2015)

Area
  - Total: 27.4 km^{2} (10.6 sq mi)
- Elevation: 187 m (614 ft)

Population (2025-01-01)
  - Total: 22,665
  - Density: 827/km^{2} (2,140/sq mi)
- Demonym: Esparregados
- Postal code: 08076
- Website: www.esparreguera.cat

Esparreguera (Catalan pronunciation: [əspərəˈɣeɾə]; Spanish: Esparraguera) is a municipality in Catalonia, in the province of Barcelona, Spain. It is situated in the comarca of el Baix Llobregat.

Esparreguera is famous in Catalonia for staging a grand version of the play Life and Passion of Jesus Christ every year in March and April, on the Sundays before and after Easter. The play is popularly known as La Passió d'Esparreguera. Over 300 actors, 50 technicians and 100 musicians participate in the play during five acts, twenty scenographic settings and more than five hours of drama, from the election of the apostles until the resurrection of Jesus.

The grand scale of the show is achieved with the volunteer contribution of the citizens of the town, in a tradition that dates back to Esparreguera's medieval origins. This tradition has made Esparreguera one of the cradles of Catalan performing arts, giving birth to actors such as the sisters Anna and Lola Lizaran, or the contemporary dancer Ramon Oller.

Shakira's music video for "Empire" was filmed in Esparreguera.
