= Alpicat =

- Municipality
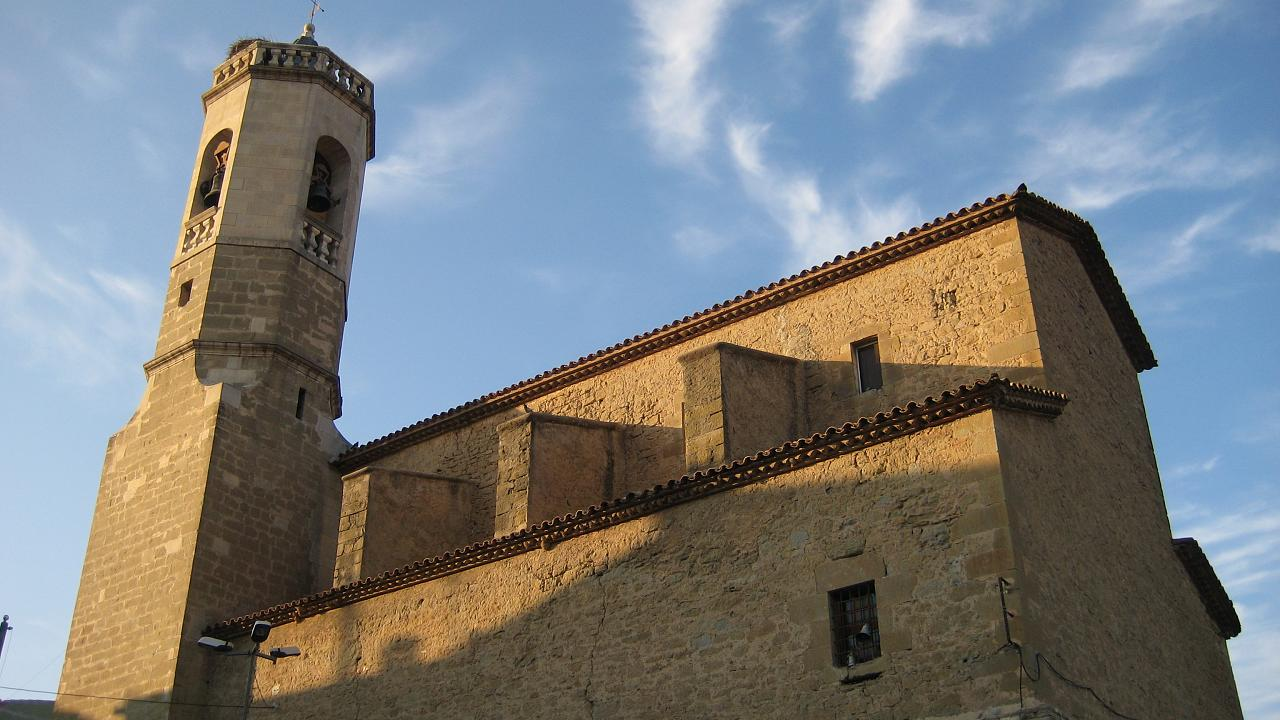
- Saint Bartholomew church, Alpicat

- Location in Catalonia Alpicat (Spain)
- Coordinates: 41°40′N 0°33′E
- Country: Spain
- Community: Catalonia
- Province: Lleida
- Comarca: Segrià

Government
  - Mayor: Joan Gilart Escuer (2015)

Area
  - Total: 15.3 km^{2} (5.9 sq mi)
- Elevation: 264 m (866 ft)

Population (2025-01-01)
  - Total: 6,515
  - Density: 426/km^{2} (1,100/sq mi)
- Website: www.alpicat.cat

Alpicat (Catalan pronunciation: [alpiˈkat]) is a municipality in the comarca of Segrià and autonomous community of Catalonia, Spain.

It has a population of 6,515 (register office, 2025).

== Notable people ==
- Ramón Abad Gimeno, member of the Parliament of Catalonia
