= Artés =

- Municipality
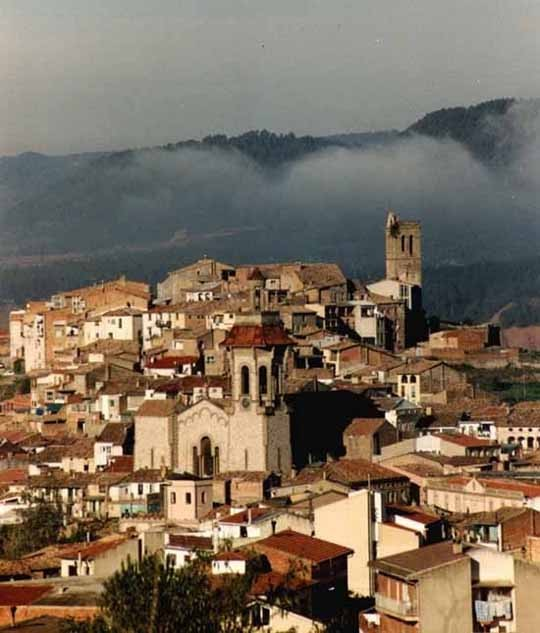

- Flag Coat of arms

- Location in Catalonia Artés (Spain)
- Coordinates: 41°47′55″N 1°57′18″E
- Country: Spain
- Community: Catalonia
- Province: Barcelona
- Comarca: Bages

Government
  - Mayor: Josep Candàliga Freixa (2015)

Area
  - Total: 17.9 km^{2} (6.9 sq mi)
- Elevation: 316 m (1,037 ft)

Population (2025-01-01)
  - Total: 6,225
  - Density: 348/km^{2} (901/sq mi)
- Demonym(s): artesenc, artesenca
- Website: artes.cat

Artés (Catalan pronunciation: [əɾˈtes]) is a Spanish town in the province of Barcelona, Bages comarca (county), in Catalonia.

In addition to the main namesake town, the municipality also contains the population entity of Vista Pirineu.

== Location ==
The town of Artés is located at the center of Catalonia, at the eastern edge of the plain zone of Bages -commonly known as Pla de Bages. The town is in the basin of the Gavarresa river and of its affluent, the stream of Malrubí.

It is bordered on the North by the towns of Sallent and Avinyó, in the South by Calders and it shares a small border in the West with Navarcles, on the limit of the Llobregat river.

The town is near the Artés Formation, a unique geological formation that owes its name to its proximity with the town.

== History ==
The name of Artés is believed to derive from the Latin word Artium , which means "fortified hill". This is based on the evidence of the existence of a 6th-century fortified church on the top of the hill of Artés, where the first settlers began to expand the village into the valley.

Little evidence of the Prehistory of Artés has been discovered to date. However, a document from the year 938 indicates the presence of three dolmens; and abundant samples of Iberian pottery have been found in the valley of Salabernada.

The archeological remains of the Classical Period are numerous and confirm the existence of continuous settlement for seven centuries. In particular, archeological finds have been made at Matacans, where there used to be a Roman villa, and at the Plaça Vella (Old Square) where three Roman inscriptions of the 2nd and 3rd centuries, one necropolis and an ancient Paleochristian Church -that can be dated between 6th and 7th centuries- were found.

The name of Artés is one of the first documented names of all the towns in Bages. Specifically, a grant dated on 24 June 889, by which the King Odó gave to the Church of Sant Pere de Vic several goods and rights; among them de Valley of Artés.

== Economy ==
At present, the most important activity of the town is industry, which counts on some important multinational companies established in the town. In 1973 the Industrial Zone of Santa Maria d'Artés was opened and in 1991 an important enlargement of it was made, even though it is now reaching its limit of usable ground.

The Rossignol Skis Group produces Rossignol and Dynastar alpine skis and Rossignol nordic skis in Artés.

Artés is also well known for its production of wine and cava. In 1996, together with other towns of the surrounding area, Artés achieved the Denomination of Origin Pla de Bages for its wines and, at the same time, it celebrated the tenth birthday of the denomination of the Cava of Artés.
