= 2015 Stjarnan season =

Stjarnan
2015 season
- Manager: Rúnar Páll Sigmundsson
- Stadium: Samsung-völlurinn
- Úrvalsdeild: 4th place
- Borgunarbikarinn: 16th-finals
- Lengjubikarinn: Group Stage
- Champions League: Second Qualifying Round
- Meistarakeppni KSÍ: 1st
- Top goalscorer: League: Jeppe Hansen (8); All: Jeppe Hansen (12)
Home colours	Away colours

The 2015 season was Stjarnan's 13th season in Úrvalsdeild and their 7th consecutive season.

Rúnar Páll Sigmundsson head coached the team for the second season running. He was assisted by Brynjar Björn Gunnarsson.

Stjarnan came into the season as league champions after winning their first league title in 2014, going unbeaten in the league.

Along with Úrvalsdeild, Stjarnan competed in the Meistarakeppni KSÍ, the Lengjubikarinn, the Borgunarbikarinn and the 2016–17 UEFA Champions League Second qualifying round for the first time in the club's history.

On 27 April Stjarnan won KR 1–0 in the Meistarakeppni KSÍ, an annual match between previous league winners and previous Icelandic cup winners.

== First team ==
As of 23 September 2015. These players competed in Úrvalsdeild, Borgunarbikarinn, Lengjubikarinn and 2016-17 UEFA Champions League

Note: Flags indicate national team as defined under FIFA eligibility rules; some limited exceptions apply. Players may hold more than one non-FIFA nationality.

No.	Pos.	Nation	Player
1	GK	FRO	Gunnar Nielsen
2	DF	ISL	Brynjar Gauti Guðjónsson
4	DF	ISL	Jóhann Laxdal
5	MF	DEN	Michael Præst (captain)
6	MF	ISL	Þorri Geir Rúnarsson
7	MF	ISL	Atli Jóhannsson
8	MF	SLV	Pablo Punyed
9	DF	ISL	Daníel Laxdal
10	FW	ISL	Veigar Páll Gunnarsson
11	MF	ISL	Arnar Már Björgvinsson
12	MF	ISL	Heiðar Ægisson
13	GK	ISL	Arnar Darri Pétursson

No.	Pos.	Nation	Player
14	DF	ISL	Hörður Árnason
16	FW	ISL	Guðjón Baldvinsson
18	FW	ISL	Jón Arnar Barðdal
19	FW	DEN	Jeppe Hansen
20	FW	ISL	Atli Freyr Ottesen Pálsson
21	FW	ISL	Snorri Páll Blöndal
22	MF	ISL	Þórhallur Kári Knútsson
23	MF	ISL	Halldór Orri Björnsson
25	GK	ISL	Sveinn Sigurður Jóhannesson
26	MF	ISL	Kristófer Konráðsson
27	FW	ISL	Garðar Jóhannsson
30	MF	ISL	Kári Pétursson

== Transfers and loans ==
=== Transfers in ===
Date	Position	No.	Player	From club	Other	Ref
16 October 2014	GK	13	(Iceland) Arnar Darri Pétursson	(Iceland) Víkingur Ó	Back from loan	
16 October 2014	DF	21	(Iceland) Baldvin Sturluson	(Iceland) Breiðablik	Back from loan	
16 October 2014	MF		(Iceland) Hilmar Þór Hilmarsson	(Iceland) Keflavík	Back from loan	
16 October 2014	DF	3	(Iceland) Aron Rúnarsson Heiðdal	(Iceland) Keflavík	Back from loan	
25 November 2014	DF	2	(Iceland) Brynjar Gauti Guðjónsson	(Iceland) ÍBV		
6 December 2014	MF	23	(Iceland) Halldór Orri Björnsson	(Sweden) Falkenbergs FF		
3 February 2015	FW	19	(Denmark) Jeppe Hansen	(Denmark) FC Fredericia		
21 February 2015	DF		(Iceland) Finn Axel Hansen	(Iceland) Skínandi		
4 April 2015	GK	1	(Faroe Islands) Gunnar Nielsen	(Scotland) Motherwell		
17 July 2015	FW	16	(Iceland) Guðjón Baldvinsson	(Denmark) FC Nordsjælland		

=== Transfers out ===
Date	Position	No.	Player	To club	Other	Ref
6 November 2014	DF	21	(Iceland) Baldvin Sturluson	(Iceland) Valur		
28 November 2014	GK	1	(Iceland) Ingvar Jónsson	(Norway) IK Start		
17 December 2014	FW	24	(Denmark) Rolf Toft	(Iceland) Víkingur R		
27 January 2015	DF	29	(Denmark) Martin Rauschenberg	(Sweden) Gefle IF		
2 March 2015	DF		(Iceland) Finn Axel Hansen	(Iceland) Skínandi		
10 March 2015	DF	4	(Denmark) Niclas Vemmelund			
19 March 2015	MF		(Iceland) Hilmar Þór Hilmarsson	(Iceland) Valur		

=== Loans out ===
Start Date	End Date	Position	No.	Player	To Club	Ref
1 August 2015	16 October 2015	DF	24	(Iceland) Brynjar Már Björnsson	(Iceland) Selfoss	
8 August 2015	31 December 2015	DF	3	(Iceland) Aron Rúnarsson Heiðdal	(Norway) Nest Sotra	
18 August 2015	31 December 2015	FW	17	(Iceland) Ólafur Karl Finsen	(Norway) Sandnes Ulf	

== Preseason ==
=== Fótbolti.net Cup ===
Stjarnan took part in the 2015 Fótbolti.net Cup, a pre-season tournament for clubs outside of Reykjavík.

The team played in Group 2 along with ÍBV, Grindavík and Keflavík. Stjarnan topped the group with 6 points after wins against ÍBV and Grindavík.

As winners of Group 2 Stjarnan went straight to the finals where they met Breiðablik. The game ended 2–1 for Breiðablik with Veigar Páll scoring Stjarnan's only goal.

Date	Round	Opponents	Stadium	Result F–A	Scorers
13 January 2015	Group Stage	Grindavík	Kórinn	3–1	Jón Arnar 15' Halldór Orri 41' Þórhallur Kári 55'
20 January 2015	Group Stage	Keflavík	Kórinn	1–2	Arnar Már ?'
27 January 2015	Group Stage	ÍBV	Kórinn	2–1	Þórhallur Kári 37' Arnar Már 80'
3 February 2015	Finals	Breiðablik	Kórinn	1–2	Veigar Páll 58'

== Lengjubikarinn ==
Stjarnan played in Group 3 in the Icelandic league cup, Lengjubikarinn along with ÍA, Valur, Grindavík, Keflavík, Fjarðabyggð, Haukar and Þór.

After a draw against Valur and a defeat against ÍA in the first two rounds Stjarnan won their remaining five games and finished in 3rd place with 16 points. Stjarnan went through to the quarter-finals as the 3rd place team with the most points but they had already announced their withdrawal from the quarter-finals.

Date	Round	Opponents	Stadium	Result F–A	Scorers
13 February 2015	Group Stage	Valur	Egilshöll	1–1	Pablo Punyed 59'
21 February 2015	Group Stage	ÍA	Akraneshöllin	0–2	
7 March 2015	Group Stage	Fjarðabyggð	Fjarðabyggðarhöllin	6–1	Ólafur Karl 39' Arnar Már 42' 62' Pablo Punyed 58' OG 80' Arnar Freyr 85'
24 March 2015	Group Stage	Þór	Samsung völlurinn	1–0	Jeppe Hansen 88'
28 March 2015	Group Stage	Keflavík	Reykjaneshöllin	2–0	Jeppe Hansen 67' 78'
31 March 2015	Group Stage	Grindavík	Kórinn	3–1	Garðar Jó 40' Ólafur Karl 58' Arnar Már 90'
7 April 2015	Group Stage	Haukar	Kórinn	1–0	Garðar Jó 22'

== Meistarakeppni KSÍ ==
Stjarnan played the 2014 Borgunarbikarinn winners KR in the Meistarakeppni KSÍ, an annual match contested between the champions of the previous Úrvalsdeild season and the holders of the Borgunarbikarinn on 27 April 2015.

Stjarnan won the game 1–0 with Þórhallur Kári Knútsson scoring the winning goal in the 82nd minute.

Date	Round	Opponents	Stadium	Result F–A	Scorers
27 April 2015	Final	KR	Samsung völlurinn	1–0	Þórhallur Kári Knútsson 82'

== Úrvalsdeild ==
=== League table ===
Pos	Team	Pld	W	D	L	GF	GA	GD	Pts	Qualification or relegation
2	Breiðablik	22	13	7	2	34	13	+21	46	Qualification for the Europa League first qualifying round
3	KR	22	12	6	4	36	21	+15	42	Qualification for the Europa League first qualifying round
4	Stjarnan	22	9	6	7	32	24	+8	33	
5	Valur	22	9	6	7	38	31	+7	33	Qualification for the Europa League first qualifying round (Note: Valur qualified for the UEFA Europa League first qualifying round by winning the 2015 Icelandic Cup.)
6	Fjölnir	22	9	6	7	36	35	+1	33	

Source: KSÍ, Soccerway
Rules for classification: 1) Points; 2) Goal difference; 3) Goals scored; 4) Head-to-head points; 5) Head-to-head goal difference; 6) Head-to-head goals scored; 7) Head-to-head away goals scored; 8) Play-off (only for deciding champion); 9) Draw.

=== Matches ===
Win Draw Loss Upcoming fixture

3 May 2015 1	ÍA	0–1	Stjarnan	Akranes
17:00 GMT	Marko Andelkovic (yellow card) 67'	Report	Ólafur Karl Finsen 23'	Stadium: Norðurálsvöllurinn; Attendance: 1250; Referee: Þóroddur Hjaltalín

10 May 2015 2	ÍBV	0–2	Stjarnan	Vestmannaeyjar
17:00 GMT	Víðir Þorvarðarson (yellow card) 54'; Tom Even Skogsrud (yellow card) 69'; Andri Ólafsson (yellow card) 73'; Gauti Þorvarðarson (yellow card) 81'	Report	Jeppe Hansen 12'; Þorri Geir Rúnarsson 63'	Stadium: Hásteinsvöllur; Attendance: 848; Referee: Þorvaldur Árnason

17 May 2015 3	Stjarnan	1–1	Leiknir R	Garðabær
19:15 GMT	Jeppe Hansen 27'; Heiðar Ægisson (yellow card) 36'; Þorri Geir Rúnarsson (yellow card) 45'	Report	Hilmar Árni Halldórsson 74' (pen.); Ólafur Hrannar Kristjánsson (yellow card) 90'	Stadium: Samsung völlurinn Attendance: 1426; Referee: Ívar Orri Kristjánsson

20 May 2015 4	Víkingur R	2–2	Stjarnan	Reykjavík
19:15 GMT	Rolf Toft 1'; Andri Rúnar Bjarnason 41'; Halldór Smári Sigurðsson (yellow card) 76'	Report	Alan Lowing 20' (o.g.); Jeppe Hansen 45'	Stadium: Víkin; Attendance: 1270; Referee: Gunnar Jarl Jónsson

26 May 2015 5	Stjarnan	1–1	FH	Garðabær
20:00 GMT	Ólafur Karl Finsen 6'	Report	Kassim Doumbia 60'; Pétur Viðarsson (yellow card) 64'; Sam Hewson (yellow card) 86'; Þórarinn Ingi Valdimarsson (yellow card) 90+3'	Stadium: Samsung völlurinn Attendance: 2264; Referee: Garðar Örn Hinriksson

31 May 2015 6	Breiðablik	3–0	Stjarnan	Kópavogur
19:15 GMT	Guðjón Pétur Lýðsson 12' (pen.) (yellow card) 42'; Arnþór Ari Atlason 15'; Elfar Freyr Helgason 37'	Report	Arnar Már Björgvinsson (yellow card) 2'; Heiðar Ægisson (yellow card) 65'	Stadium: Kópavogsvöllur; Attendance: 1638; Referee: Þorvaldur Árnason

7 June 2015 7	Stjarnan	1–3	Fjölnir	Garðabær
19:15 GMT	Halldór Orri Björnsson 80' (pen.); Heiðar Ægisson (yellow card) 63'; Atli Jóhannsson (yellow card) 86'	Report	Mark Charles Magee 10' 49'; Own goal 71'; Ragnar Leósson (yellow card) 75'; Bergsveinn Ólafsson (yellow card) 77'	Stadium: Samsung völlurinn Attendance: 780; Referee: Gunnar Jarl Jónsson

15 June 2015 8	Fylkir	0–2	Stjarnan	Reykjavík
19:15 GMT	Andrés Már Jóhannesson (yellow card) 34'	Report	Jón Arnar Barðdal 42' (yellow card) 29'; Halldór Orri Björnsson 60'; Michael Præst (yellow card) 60'	Stadium: Fylkisvöllur; Attendance: 977; Referee: Guðmundur Ársæll Guðmundsson

22 June 2015 9	Stjarnan	0–1	KR	Garðabær
20:00 GMT	Brynjar Gauti Guðjónsson (yellow card) 40'; Pablo Punyed (yellow card) 54'; Michael Præst (yellow card) 55'; Ólafur Karl Finsen (yellow card) 71'; Gunnar Nielsen (red card) 76'; Arnar Már Björgvinsson (yellow card) 79'	Report	Almarr Ormarsson 68'; Pálmi Rafn Pálmason (yellow card) 83'	Stadium: Samsungvöllurinn; Attendance: 1337; Referee: Erlendur Eiríksson

29 June 2015 10	Keflavík	1–2	Stjarnan	Keflavík
20:00 GMT	Sigurbergur Elísson 34'; Sindri Snær Magnússon (yellow card) 34'; Samuel Jimenez Hernandez (yellow card) 52'; Frans Elvarsson (yellow card) 55'; Unnar Már Unnarsson (yellow card) 72'	Report	Jeppe Hansen 23'; Arnar Már Björgvinsson 46'; Pablo Punyed (yellow card) 68'	Stadium: Nettóvöllurinn; Attendance: 840; Referee: Valgeir Valgeirsson

10 July 2015 11	Stjarnan	1–2	Valur	Garðabær
20:00 GMT	Halldór Orri Björnsson 21'; Ólafur Karl Finsen (yellow card) 49'	Report	Own goal 27'; Kristinn Freyr Sigurðsson 77'; Patrick Pedersen (yellow card) 73'	Stadium: Samsungvöllurinn; Attendance: 823; Referee: Þorvaldur Árnason

18 July 2015 12	Stjarnan	1–1	ÍA	Garðabær
16:00 GMT	Ólafur Karl Finsen 38'; Arnar Már Björgvinsson (yellow card) 46'	Report	Garðar Gunnlaugsson 76'; Albert Hafsteinsson (yellow card) 27' (yellow card) 63' (red card); Þórður Þorsteinn Þórðarson (yellow card) 65'	Stadium: Samsungvöllurinn; Attendance: 803; Referee: Valdimar Pálsson

26 July 2015 13	Stjarnan	3–0	ÍBV	Garðabær
17:00 GMT	Jeppe Hansen 19' 35'; Þórhallur Kári Knútsson 90+2'; Ólafur Karl Finsen (yellow card) 15'	Report	Gunnar Heiðar Þorvaldsson (yellow card) 30'; Víðir Þorvarðarson (yellow card) 67'; Hafsteinn Briem (yellow card) 80'	Stadium: Samsungvöllurinn; Attendance: 701; Referee: Garðar Örn Hinriksson

5 August 2015 14	Leiknir R	1–0	Stjarnan	Reykjavík
19:15 GMT	Halldór Kristinn Halldórsson 75'; Charley Roussel Fomen (yellow card) 72'; Elvar Páll Sigurðsson (yellow card) 81'	Report	Hörður Árnason (yellow card) 65'; Arnar Már Björgvinsson (yellow card) 81'	Stadium: Leiknisvöllur; Attendance: 847; Referee: Guðmundur Ársæll Guðmundsson

9 August 2015 15	Stjarnan	1–1	Víkingur R	Garðabær
19:15 GMT	Þórhallur Kári Knútsson 75'; Michael Præst (red card) 77'; Brynjar Gauti Guðjónsson (yellow card) 82' (yellow card) 86' (red card); Pablo Punyed (yellow card) 88'; Jóhann Laxdal (yellow card) 90+2'	Report	Vladimir Tufegdzic 83' (yellow card) 88'; Milos Zivkovic (yellow card) 42'; Igor Tasković (yellow card) 87'	Stadium: Samsung völlurinn Attendance: 803; Referee: Ívar Orri Kristjánsson

17 August 2015 16	FH	4–0	Stjarnan	Hafnarfjörður
18:30 GMT	Atli Viðar Björnsson 11'; Bjarni Þór Viðarsson 23'; Atli Guðnason 49'; Emil Pálsson 67'; Steven Lennon (yellow card) 83'	Report	Þorri Geir Rúnarsson (yellow card) 48'; Halldór Orri Björnsson (yellow card) 76'; Jóhann Laxdal (yellow card) 83'	Stadium: Kaplakrikavöllur; Attendance: 2097; Referee: Erlendur Eiríksson

24 August 2015 17	Stjarnan	0–1	Breiðablik	Garðabær
20:00 GMT	Daníel Laxdal (yellow card) 90+2'	Report	Jonathan Glenn 43' (yellow card) 68'; Oliver Sigurjónsson (yellow card) 25'; Arnór Sveinn Aðalsteinsson (yellow card) 84'	Stadium: Samsung völlurinn Attendance: 1156; Referee: Vilhjálmur Alvar Þórarinsson

30 August 2015 18	Fjölnir	1–1	Stjarnan	Reykjavík
18:00 GMT	Gunnar Már Guðmundsson 25'	Report	Guðjón Baldvinsson 77'; Þórhallur Kári Knútsson (yellow card) 80'	Stadium: Fjölnisvöllur; Attendance: 826; Referee: Guðmundur Ársæll Guðmundsson

14 September 2015 19	Stjarnan	1–0	Fylkir	Garðabær
19:15 GMT	Pablo Punyed 31'; Þorri Geir Rúnarsson (yellow card) 42'; Guðjón Baldvinsson (yellow card) 42'; Jeppe Hansen (yellow card) 81'	Report	Ásgeir Börkur Ásgeirsson (yellow card) 42'; Ásgeir Eyþórsson (yellow card) 59'; Tómas Þorsteinsson (yellow card) 76'; Tonci Radovnikovic (yellow card) 97'	Stadium: Samsung völlurinn Attendance: 836; Referee: Ívar Orri Kristjánsson

20 September 2015 20	KR	0–3	Stjarnan	Reykjavík
16:00 GMT	Stefán Logi Magnússon (red card) 29'; Hólmbert Friðjónsson (yellow card) 52'; Søren Frederiksen (yellow card) 76'	Report	Veigar Páll Gunnarsson 30' (pen.) (yellow card) 35'; Guðjón Baldvinsson 46' (yellow card) 79'; Pablo Punyed 78'; Halldór Orri Björnsson (yellow card) 36'; Þórhallur Kári Knútsson (yellow card) 49'; Brynjar Gauti Guðjónsson (yellow card) 51'; Michael Præst (yellow card) 52'	Stadium: Alvogenvöllurinn; Attendance: 515; Referee: Valgeir Valgeirsson

26 September 2015 21	Stjarnan	7–0	Keflavík	Garðabær
14:00 GMT	Guðjón Baldvinsson 5' 15' 54'; Halldór Orri Björnsson 18'; Þórhallur Kári Knútsson 56'; Jeppe Hansen 85'; Heiðar Ægisson 90'	Report	Farid Zato-Arouna (yellow card) 47'; Stefan Alexander Ljubicic (yellow card) 74'	Stadium: Samsung völlurinn Attendance: 356; Referee: Þóroddur Hjaltalín

3 October 2015 22	Valur	1–2	Stjarnan	Reykjavík
14:00 GMT	Emil Atlason 71'; Sigurður Egill Lárusson (yellow card) 19'; Mathias Schlie (yellow card) 51'	Report	Jeppe Hansen 65'; Arnar Már Björgvinsson 67'; Pablo Punyed (yellow card) 53' (yellow card) 63' (red card)	Stadium: Vodafonevöllurinn; Attendance: 922; Referee: Vilhjálmur Alvar Þórarinsson

=== Results ===
Overall								Home						Away					
Pld	W	D	L	GF	GA	GD	Pts	W	D	L	GF	GA	GD	W	D	L	GF	GA	GD
22	9	6	7	32	24	+8	33	3	4	4	17	11	+6	6	2	3	15	13	+2

Last updated: 26 September 2015.
Source: KSÍ

=== Points breakdown ===
- Points at home: 13
- Points away from home: 17
- 6 Points: ÍBV, Fylkir, Keflavík
- 4 Points: ÍA
- 3 Points: KR, Valur
- 2 Points: Víkingur R
- 1 Points: Leiknir R, FH, Fjölnir
- 0 Points: Breiðablik

== Borgunarbikarinn ==
Stjarnan came into the Icelandic cup, Borgunarbikarinn, in the 32nd-finals and were drawn against Leiknir Reykjavík. Stjarnan won the game after penalties. The game had ended 1–1. In the 16th-finals the team was drawn against Fylkir. Stjarnan played poorly and lost the game 3–0.

Win Draw Loss Upcoming fixture

3 June 2014 32nd-finals	Stjarnan	1–1 (6–5 p)	Leiknir R	Garðabær
19:15 GMT	Jeppe Hansen 32'; Ólafur Karl Finsen (yellow card) 30'; Gunnar Nielsen (yellow card) 101'	Report	Kristján Páll Jónsson 22'; Ólafur Hrannar Kristjánsson (yellow card) 81'; Halldór Kristinn Halldórsson (yellow card) 105'	Stadium: Samsung völlurinn Attendance: 781; Referee: Erlendur Eiríksson
	Penalties
	Arnar Már Björgvinsson (penalty scored); Heiðar Ægisson (penalty scored); Ólafur Karl Finsen (penalty scored); Halldór Orri Björnsson (penalty scored); Jón Arnar Barðdal (penalty scored); Hörður Árnason (penalty scored)		(penalty scored) Hilmar Árni Halldórsson; (penalty scored) Ólafur Hrannar Kristjánsson; (penalty scored) Atli Arnarson; (penalty scored) Elvar Páll Sigurðsson; (penalty scored) Halldór Kristinn Halldórsson; (penalty missed) Charley Fomen

18 June 2014 16th-finals	Stjarnan	0–3	Fylkir	Garðabær
19:15 GMT	Veigar Páll Gunnarsson (yellow card) 86'	Report	Tómas J. Þorsteinsson 26'; Albert Brynjar Ingason 77'; Ragnar Bragi Sveinsson 87'; Ásgeir Eyþórsson (yellow card) 64'; Ásgeir Börkur Ásgeirsson (yellow card) 86'	Stadium: Samsung völlurinn Attendance: 630; Referee: Garðar Örn Hinriksson

== Champions League ==
Stjarnan came into the 2015-16 UEFA Champions League in the 2nd qualifying round.

On 7 July it was confirmed that Stjarnan would play Celtic in the second qualifying round for the 2015-16 UEFA Champions League. Celtic F.C. won the first leg at home 2–0 after dominating for most of the game. In the second leg Stjarnan started well and scored a goal in the 7th minute through Ólafur Karl giving them a glimmer of hope in the tie but Celtic equalised on the 33rd minute and scored three more goals in the game winning the tie 6–1.

=== Second qualifying round ===
Win Draw Loss Upcoming fixture

15 July 2015 First leg	Celtic (Scotland)	2–0	(Iceland) Stjarnan	Glasgow, Scotland
20:45 CET	Dedryck Boyata 44'; Stefan Johansen 56'; Leigh Griffiths (penalty missed); Efe Ambrose (yellow card) 88'	Report	Gunnar Nielsen (yellow card) 62'	Stadium: Celtic Park; Referee: (Germany) Daniel Siebert

22 July 2015 Second leg	Stjarnan (Iceland)	1–4 (1–6 agg.)	(Scotland) Celtic	Garðabær, Iceland
21:15 CET	Ólafur Karl Finsen 7'; Brynjar Gauti Guðjónsson (yellow card) 61'	Report	Nir Biton 33'; Charlie Mulgrew 49'; Leigh Griffiths 88'; Stefan Johansen 93'	Stadium: Samsung-völlurinn; Referee: (Belgium) Jonathan Lardot

== Statistics ==
=== Goalscorers ===
Includes all competitive matches.

As of match played 3 October 2015

Rank	Pos.	No.	Player	Úrvalsdeild	Borgunarbikar	Lengjubikar	Meistarkeppni KSÍ	Europe	Total
1	FW	19	(Denmark) Jeppe Hansen	8	1	3	0	0	12
2	FW	17	(Iceland) Ólafur Karl Finsen	3	0	2	0	1	6
3	FW	16	(Iceland) Guðjón Baldvinsson	5	0	0	0	0	5
4	MF	11	(Iceland) Arnar Már Björgvinsson	2	0	3	0	0	5
5	MF	8	(El Salvador) Pablo Punyed	2	0	2	0	0	4
6	MF	23	(Iceland) Halldór Orri Björnsson	4	0	0	0	0	4
7	MF	22	(Iceland) Þórhallur Kári Knútsson	3	0	0	1	0	4
8	FW	27	(Iceland) Garðar Jóhannsson	0	0	2	0	0	2
9	FW	20	(Iceland) Atli Freyr Ottesen Pálsson	0	0	1	0	0	1
10	MF	6	(Iceland) Þorri Geir Rúnarsson	1	0	0	0	0	1
11	FW	18	(Iceland) Jón Arnar Barðdal	1	0	0	0	0	1
12	FW	10	(Iceland) Veigar Páll Gunnarsson	1	0	0	0	0	1
13	MF	12	(Iceland) Heiðar Ægisson	1	0	0	0	0	1

=== Appearances ===
Includes all competitive matches. Numbers in parentheses are sub appearances

As of match played 3 October 2015

No.	Pos.	Player	Úrvalsdeild	Borgunarbikar	Lengjubikar	Meistarakeppni KSÍ	Europe	Total
1	GK	(Faroe Islands) Gunnar Nielsen	20	1	0	1	2	24
2	DF	(Iceland) Brynjar Gauti Guðjónsson	21	2	6	1	2	32
3	DF	(Iceland) Aron Rúnarsson Heiðdal	0	0	2 (3)	0	0	5
4	DF	(Iceland) Jóhann Laxdal	1 (6)	0	0	0	0	7
5	MF	(Denmark) Michael Præst	16	1	0	0	2	19
6	MF	(Iceland) Þorri Geir Rúnarsson	17 (2)	2	2	0	1 (1)	25
7	MF	(Iceland) Atli Jóhannsson	1 (2)	0	5 (1)	0	1	10
8	MF	(El Salvador) Pablo Punyed	18 (1)	0	4	1	1	25
9	DF	(Iceland) Daníel Laxdal	21	2	6	1	2	32
10	FW	(Iceland) Veigar Páll Gunnarsson	6 (11)	1 (1)	4 (2)	0	(2)	27
11	MF	(Iceland) Arnar Már Björgvinsson	17 (4)	1 (1)	6	1	2	32
12	MF	(Iceland) Heiðar Ægisson	22	2	6	1	2	33
13	GK	(Iceland) Arnar Darri Pétursson	0	0	3 (1)	0	0	4
14	DF	(Iceland) Hörður Árnason	18 (1)	2	6	0	2	29
16	FW	(Iceland) Guðjón Baldvinsson	11	0	0	0	0	11
17	FW	(Iceland) Ólafur Karl Finsen	15 (1)	2	5 (1)	1	2	27
18	FW	(Iceland) Jón Arnar Barðdal	1 (4)	1 (1)	3 (2)	(1)	(1)	14
19	FW	(Denmark) Jeppe Hansen	16 (5)	2	1 (3)	1	2	30
20	FW	(Iceland) Atli Freyr Ottesen Pálsson	(2)	(1)	3 (3)	1	(1)	11
21	FW	(Iceland) Snorri Páll Blöndal	0	0	0	0	0	0
22	MF	(Iceland) Þórhallur Kári Knútsson	5 (7)	1	6 (1)	(1)	0	21
23	MF	(Iceland) Halldór Orri Björnsson	13 (5)	1 (1)	0	1	1 (1)	23
24	DF	(Iceland) Brynjar Már Björnsson	(1)	0	1 (2)	1	0	5
25	GK	(Iceland) Sveinn Sigurður Jóhannesson	2 (1)	1	4	0	0	8
26	MF	(Iceland) Kristófer Konráðsson	(1)	0	(3)	(1)	0	5
27	FW	(Iceland) Garðar Jóhannsson	1 (6)	(1)	4	0	0	12
30	MF	(Iceland) Kári Pétursson	(2)	0	(5)	0	0	7
	DF	(Iceland) Finn Axel Hansen	0	0	(1)	0	0	1

=== Disciplinary record ===
Includes all competitive matches.

As of match played 3 October 2015

No.	Pos.	Player	Úrvalsdeild			Borgunarbikar			Lengjubikar			Meistarakeppni KSÍ			Europe			Total		
No.	Pos.	Player	Yellow card	Second yellow card	Red card	Yellow card	Second yellow card	Red card	Yellow card	Second yellow card	Red card	Yellow card	Second yellow card	Red card	Yellow card	Second yellow card	Red card	Yellow card	Second yellow card	Red card
1	GK	(Faroe Islands) Gunnar Nielsen	0	0	1	1	0	0	0	0	0	0	0	0	1	0	0	2	0	1
2	DF	(Iceland) Brynjar Gauti Guðjónsson	3	1	0	0	0	0	2	0	0	1	0	0	1	0	0	7	1	0
4	DF	(Iceland) Jóhann Laxdal	2	0	0	0	0	0	0	0	0	0	0	0	0	0	0	2	0	0
5	MF	(Denmark) Michael Præst	3	0	1	0	0	0	0	0	0	0	0	0	0	0	0	3	0	1
6	MF	(Iceland) Þorri Geir Rúnarsson	3	0	0	0	0	0	0	0	0	0	0	0	0	0	0	3	0	0
7	MF	(Iceland) Atli Jóhannsson	1	0	0	0	0	0	2	0	0	0	0	0	0	0	0	3	0	0
8	MF	(El Salvador) Pablo Punyed	4	1	0	0	0	0	2	0	0	0	0	0	0	0	0	6	1	0
9	DF	(Iceland) Daníel Laxdal	1	0	0	0	0	0	2	0	0	0	0	0	0	0	0	3	0	0
10	FW	(Iceland) Veigar Páll Gunnarsson	1	0	0	1	0	0	1	0	0	0	0	0	0	0	0	3	0	0
11	MF	(Iceland) Arnar Már Björgvinsson	4	0	0	0	0	0	0	0	0	0	0	0	0	0	0	4	0	0
12	MF	(Iceland) Heiðar Ægisson	3	0	0	0	0	0	2	0	0	0	0	0	0	0	0	5	0	0
14	DF	(Iceland) Hörður Árnason	1	0	0	0	0	0	0	0	0	0	0	0	0	0	0	1	0	0
16	FW	(Iceland) Guðjón Baldvinsson	2	0	0	0	0	0	0	0	0	0	0	0	0	0	0	2	0	0
17	MF	(Iceland) Ólafur Karl Finsen	3	0	0	1	0	0	1	0	0	0	0	0	0	0	0	5	0	0
18	FW	(Iceland) Jón Arnar Barðdal	1	0	0	0	0	0	0	0	0	0	0	0	0	0	0	1	0	0
19	FW	(Denmark) Jeppe Hansen	1	0	0	0	0	0	1	0	0	0	0	0	0	0	0	2	0	0
22	MF	(Iceland) Þórhallur Kári Knútsson	2	0	0	0	0	0	0	0	0	0	0	0	0	0	0	2	0	0
23	MF	(Iceland) Halldór Orri Björnsson	2	0	0	0	0	0	0	0	0	0	0	0	0	0	0	2	0	0

=== Squad stats ===
Includes all competitive matches; Úrvalsdeild, Borgunarbikar, Lengjubikar, Meistarakeppni KSÍ and UEFA Champions League.

	Úrvalsdeild	Borgunarbikar	Lengjubikar	Meistarakeppni KSÍ	Europe	Total
Games played	22	2	7	1	2	34
Games won	9	1	5	1	0	16
Games drawn	6	0	1	0	0	7
Games lost	7	1	1	0	2	11
Goals scored	32	1	14	1	1	49
Goals conceded	24	4	5	0	6	39
Clean sheets	7	0	3	1	0	11
Yellow cards	35	3	12	1	2	53
Red cards	4	0	0	0	0	4

Last updated: 3 October 2015
Source: KSÍ
