= 2016 Stjarnan season =

Stjarnan
2016 season
- Manager: Rúnar Páll Sigmundsson
- Stadium: Samsung völlurinn
- Lengjubikarinn: Group stages
- Top goalscorer: League: Veigar Páll Gunnarsson (3); All: Veigar Páll Gunnarsson (6); Guðjón Baldvinsson (6); Jeppe Hansen (6)
Home colours	Away colours

The 2016 season will be Stjarnan's 14th season in Úrvalsdeild and their 8th consecutive season.

Rúnar Páll Sigmundsson will head coach the team for the third season running. He will be assisted by Brynjar Björn Gunnarsson.

Along with Úrvalsdeild, Stjarnan will compete in Lengjubikarinn and Borgunarbikarinn.

== First Team ==
As of 26 May 2016 These players competed in Úrvalsdeild, Borgunarbikarinn and Lengjubikarinn

Note: Flags indicate national team as defined under FIFA eligibility rules; some limited exceptions apply. Players may hold more than one non-FIFA nationality.

No.	Pos.	Nation	Player
1	GK	JAM	Duwayne Kerr
2	DF	ISL	Brynjar Gauti Guðjónsson
3	DF	ISL	Aron Rúnarsson Heiðdal
4	DF	ISL	Jóhann Laxdal
5	DF	ISL	Grétar Sigfinnur Sigurðarson
6	MF	ISL	Þorri Geir Rúnarsson
7	FW	ISL	Guðjón Baldvinsson
8	MF	ISL	Baldur Sigurðsson (captain)
9	DF	ISL	Daníel Laxdal
10	FW	ISL	Veigar Páll Gunnarsson
11	MF	ISL	Arnar Már Björgvinsson
12	DF	ISL	Heiðar Ægisson
14	DF	ISL	Hörður Árnason

No.	Pos.	Nation	Player
15	MF	ISL	Hilmar Árni Halldórsson
16	FW	ISL	Ævar Ingi Jóhannesson
17	FW	ISL	Ólafur Karl Finsen
19	FW	DEN	Jeppe Hansen
20	MF	ISL	Eyjólfur Héðinsson
21	FW	ISL	Snorri Páll Blöndal
23	MF	ISL	Halldór Orri Björnsson
24	DF	ISL	Brynjar Már Björnsson
25	GK	ISL	Hörður Fannar Björgvinsson
27	GK	ISL	Guðjón Orri Sigurjónsson
28	MF	ISL	Kristófer Ingi Kristinsson
29	MF	ISL	Alex Þór Hauksson
—	GK	ISL	Fjalar Þorgeirsson

== Transfers and loans ==
=== Transfers In ===
Date	Position	No.	Player	From club	Other	Ref
15 October 2015	DF	5	(Iceland) Grétar Sigfinnur Sigurðarson	(Iceland) KR		
16 October 2015	DF	24	(Iceland) Brynjar Már Björnsson	(Iceland) Selfoss	Back from loan	
16 October 2015	FW	18	(Iceland) Jón Arnar Barðdal	(Iceland) Þróttur R.	Back from loan	
23 October 2015	MF	15	(Iceland) Hilmar Árni Halldórsson	(Iceland) Leiknir R.		
14 November 2015	MF	8	(Iceland) Baldur Sigurðsson	(Norway) SønderjyskE		
18 November 2015	MF	20	(Iceland) Eyjólfur Héðinsson	(Denmark) FC Midtjylland		
30 November 2015	GK	27	(Iceland) Guðjón Orri Sigurjónsson	(Iceland) ÍBV		
29 December 2015	FW	16	(Iceland) Ævar Ingi Jóhannesson	(Iceland) KA		
2 March 2016	FW	17	(Iceland) Ólafur Karl Finsen	(Norway) Sandnes Ulf	Back from loan	
2 April 2016	GK	1	(Jamaica) Duwayne Kerr	(Norway) Sarpsborg 08		
25 May 2016	GK		(Iceland) Fjalar Þorgeirsson	(Iceland) SR		

=== Transfers Out ===
Date	Position	No.	Player	To club	Other	Ref
16 October 2015	GK	13	(Iceland) Arnar Darri Pétursson		Out of Contract	
16 October 2015	MF	5	(Denmark) Michael Præst	(Iceland) KR		
28 October 2015	GK	1	(Faroe Islands) Gunnar Nielsen	(Iceland) FH		
4 November 2015	MF	8	(El Salvador) Pablo Punyed	(Iceland) ÍBV		
14 November 2015	FW	27	(Iceland) Garðar Jóhannsson	(Iceland) Fylkir		

=== Loans in ===
Start Date	End Date	Position	No.	Player	From Club	Ref
6 April 2016	16 October 2016	GK	25	(Iceland) Hörður Fannar Björgvinsson	(Iceland) KR	

=== Loans out ===
Start Date	End Date	Position	No.	Player	To Club	Ref
22 February 2016	16 October 2016	FW	20	(Iceland) Atli Freyr Ottesen Pálsson	(Iceland) Leiknir R.	
5 April 2016	16 October 2016	MF	22	(Iceland) Þórhallur Kári Knútsson	(Iceland) Víkingur Ó.	
7 April 2016	16 October 2016	MF	30	(Iceland) Kári Pétursson	(Iceland) Leiknir R.	
5 May 2016	16 October 2016	GK	25	(Iceland) Sveinn Sigurður Jóhannesson	(Iceland) Fjarðabyggð	
5 May 2016	16 October 2016	FW	18	(Iceland) Jón Arnar Barðdal	(Iceland) Fjarðabyggð	

== Pre-season ==
=== Fótbolti.net Cup ===
Stjarnan took part in the 2016 Fótbolti.net Tournament, a pre-season tournament held in January every year.

The team played in Group 2 along with ÍBV, Breiðablik and Víkingur Ó. Stjarnan finished second in the group behind ÍBV but level on points with seven. Stjarnan had an inferior goal difference.

Stjarnan were heavily defeated in the game for the bronze against ÍA. Even though Stjarnan saw a lot of the ball it was ÍA who scored the goals and after 90 minutes ÍA had scored 6 against Stjarnan's 1.

Date	Round	Opponents	Stadium	Result F–A	Scorers
12 January 2016	Group stage	Víkingur Ó.	Kórinn	3–2	Grétar Sigfinnur ?' Hilmar Árni ?'(pen.) Arnar Már ?'
17 January 2016	Group stage	ÍBV	Kórinn	1–1	Guðjón B. 53'
20 January 2016	Group stage	Breiðablik	Fífan	3–2	Arnar Már 26' Ævar Ingi 46' Guðjón B. 65'
28 January 2016	3rd place final	ÍA	Samsung völlurinn	1–6	Jeppe Hansen 18'

== Lengjubikarinn ==
Stjarnan played in Group 1 in the Icelandic league cup, Lengjubikarinn along with ÍBV, Valur, Huginn, Keflavík and Fram.

After three wins and two defeats Stjarnan finished third in the group and failed to advance through to the knockout stages.

=== Matches ===
Win Draw Loss Upcoming fixture

14 February 2016 Group stages	Fram	0–3	Stjarnan	Reykjavík
20:15 GMT	Hafþór Mar Aðalgeirsson (yellow card) 65'; Kristófer Jacobson Reyes (yellow card) 90+3'	Report	Hilmar Árni Halldórsson 11'; Grétar Sigfinnur Sigurðarson 17'; Veigar Páll Gunnarsson 75'; Ævar Ingi Jóhannesson (yellow card) 83'	Stadium: Egilshöll; Referee: Gunnar Jarl Jónsson

5 March 2016 Group stages	Stjarnan	3–1	ÍBV	Garðabær
12:00 GMT	Guðjón Baldvinsson 11' (yellow card) 45+1'; Hilmar Árni Halldórsson 27' (pen.); Arnar Már Björgvinsson 81'	Report	Sindri Snær Magnússon 77'; Jón Ingason (yellow card) 26'	Stadium: Samsung völlurinn Referee: Valgeir Valgeirsson

9 March 2016 Group stages	Keflavík	3–2	Stjarnan	Reykjanesbær
19:00 GMT	Guðmundur Magnússon 34'; Páll Olgeir Þorsteinsson 55'; Magnús Þórir Matthíasson 63'; Einar Orri Einarsson (yellow card) 90+3'	Report	Jeppe Hansen 32'; Veigar Páll Gunnarsson 90+2'	Stadium: Reykjaneshöllin; Referee: Vilhjálmur Alvar Þórarinsson

19 March 2016 Group stages	Stjarnan	8–0	Huginn	Garðabær
13:30 GMT	Guðjón Baldvinsson 4' 42'; Brynjar Gauti Guðjónsson 25'; Hilmar Árni Halldórsson 38'; Jeppe Hansen 66' 71'; Ólafur Karl Finsen 87'; Veigar Páll Gunnarsson 90+1'; Ævar Ingi Jóhannesson (yellow card) 19'	Report	Blazo Lalevic (yellow card) 72'	Stadium: Samsung völlurinn Referee: Örvar Sær Gíslason

31 March 2016 Group stages	Stjarnan	2–3	Valur	Garðabær
18:00 GMT	Hörður Árnason 7'; Ólafur Karl Finsen 90+2'	Report	Nikolaj Andreas Hansen 28'; Kristinn Freyr Sigurðsson 30'; Tómas Óli Garðarsson 90+3'	Stadium: Samsung völlurinn Referee: Pétur Guðmundsson

== Úrvalsdeild ==
=== League table ===
Pos	Team	Pld	W	D	L	GF	GA	GD	Pts	Qualification or relegation
1	FH (C)	22	12	7	3	32	17	+15	43	Qualification for the Champions League second qualifying round
2	Stjarnan	22	12	3	7	43	31	+12	39	Qualification for the Europa League first qualifying round
3	KR	22	11	5	6	29	20	+9	38	Qualification for the Europa League first qualifying round
4	Fjölnir	22	11	4	7	42	25	+17	37	
5	Valur	22	10	5	7	41	28	+13	35	Qualification for the Europa League first qualifying round (Note: Valur qualified for the Europa League first qualifying round by winning the 2016 Icelandic Cup.)

Source: KSÍ (in Icelandic), Soccerway
Rules for classification: 1) Points; 2) Goal difference; 3) Goals scored; 4) Head-to-head points; 5) Head-to-head goal difference; 6) Head-to-head goals scored; 7) Head-to-head away goals scored; 8) Play-off (only for deciding champion); 9) Draw.
(C) Champions

=== Matches ===
Win Draw Loss Upcoming fixture

2 May 2016 1	Stjarnan	2–0	Fylkir	Garðabær
19:15 GMT	Veigar Páll Gunnarsson 78' 86'; Brynjar Gauti Guðjónsson (yellow card) 74'	Report	Ásgeir Eyþórsson (yellow card) 61' (yellow card) 77' (red card)	Stadium: Samsung völlurinn Attendance: 1470; Referee: Valdimar Pálsson

8 May 2016 2	Víkingur R.	1–2	Stjarnan	Reykjavík
19:15 GMT	Alex Freyr Hilmarsson 10'; Dofri Snorrason (yellow card) 90+3'	Report	Baldur Sigurðsson 58' (yellow card) 90+1'; Halldór Orri Björnsson 68'; Guðjón Baldvinsson (yellow card) 90+4'	Stadium: Víkingsvöllur; Attendance: 1250; Referee: Pétur Guðmundsson

12 May 2016 3	Stjarnan	6–0	Þróttur R.	Garðabær
19:15 GMT	Guðjón Baldvinsson 1' 28'; Veigar Páll Gunnarsson 10'; Ævar Ingi Jóhannesson 49'; Jeppe Hansen 51' 52'; Grétar Sigfinnur Sigurðarson (yellow card) 38'	Report	Hallur Hallsson (yellow card) 54'; Hreinn Ingi Örnólfsson (yellow card) 66'	Stadium: Samsung völlurinn Attendance: 914; Referee: Örvar Sær Gíslason

17 May 2016 4	KR	1–1	Stjarnan	Reykjavík
20:00 GMT	Indriði Sigurðsson 51'; Skúli Jón Friðgeirsson (yellow card) 48'; Michael Præst (yellow card) 54'	Report	Baldur Sigurðsson 5' (yellow card) 44'; Heiðar Ægisson (yellow card) 34'; Daníel Laxdal (yellow card) 45+1'; Halldór Orri Björnsson (yellow card) 50'	Stadium: Alvogenvöllurinn; Referee: Þóroddur Hjaltalín

23 May 2016 5	Stjarnan	1–1	FH	Garðabær
20:00 GMT	Hilmar Árni Halldórsson 87'; Þorri Geir Rúnarsson (yellow card) 34'; Guðjón Baldvinsson (yellow card) 90+3'	Report	Emil Pálsson 39' (yellow card) 19'; Böðvar Böðvarsson (yellow card) 43'; Kristján Flóki Finnbogason (yellow card) 79'; Bjarni Þór Viðarsson (yellow card) 83'	Stadium: Samsung völlurinn Attendance: 1931; Referee: Þorvaldur Árnason

30 May 2016 6	Stjarnan	1–3	Breiðablik	Garðabær
20:00 GMT	Arnar Már Björgvinsson 82'; Halldór Orri Björnsson (yellow card) 75'	Report	Daniel Bamberg 72'; Atli Sigurjónsson 80'; Arnþór Ari Atlason 90'; Höskuldur Gunnlaugsson (yellow card) 59'; Guðmundur Atli Steinþórsson (yellow card) 83'	Stadium: Samsung völlurinn Attendance: 1482; Referee: Vilhjálmur Alvar Þórarinsson

5 June 2016 7	Valur	2–0	Stjarnan	Reykjavík
17:00 GMT	Hansen 21'; Sindri Bjornsson (yellow card) 59'; Heiðar Ægisson 62' (o.g.)	Summary	Atli Freyr Ottesen (yellow card) 56'; Árnason (yellow card) 61'	Stadium: Valsvöllur; Attendance: 1,045; Referee: (Iceland) Gunnar Jarl Jónsson

23 June 2016 8	Stjarnan	1–0	ÍBV	Garðabær
18:00 GMT	Hilmar Árni Halldórsson (yellow card) 26'; Arnar Már Björgvinsson 29'; Laxdal (yellow card) 62'; Rúnar Páll Sigmundsson (red card) 85'; Baldvinsson (red card) 90+3'	Summary	Sindri Snær Magnússon (yellow card) 49'; Siers (yellow card) 79'; Punyed (yellow card) 84'	Stadium: Samsung völlurinn Attendance: 519; Referee: (Iceland) Thorvaldur Arnason

29 June 2016 9	ÍA	4–2	Stjarnan	Akranes
19:15 GMT	Gunnlaugsson 8' (pen.) 63' 72'; Jón Vilhelm Ákason (yellow card) 59'; Darren Lough 66'	Summary	Hilmar Árni Halldórsson 5'; Brynjar Gudjónsson 56'	Stadium: Norðurálsvöllurinn; Attendance: 492; Referee: (Iceland) Gunnar Jarl Jónsson

=== Results by matchday ===
Matchday	1	2	3	4	5	6	7	8	9	10	11	12	13	14	15	16	17	18	19	20	21	22
Ground	H	A	H	A	H	H	A	H	A	H	A	A	H	A	H	A	A	H	A	H	A	H
Result	W	W	W	D	D	L	L	W	L	W	W	W	W	D	L	L	L	L	W	W	W	W
Position	3	3	1	1	1	2	3	2	3	2	2	2	2	3	4	4	4	4	2	2	2	2

Updated to match(es) played on 1 October 2016. Source:
A = Away; H = Home; W = Win; D = Draw; L = Loss

=== Results ===
Overall								Home						Away					
Pld	W	D	L	GF	GA	GD	Pts	W	D	L	GF	GA	GD	W	D	L	GF	GA	GD
22	12	3	7	43	31	+12	39	7	1	3	26	13	+13	5	2	4	17	18	−1

Last updated: 1 October 2016.
Source: KSÍ

=== Points breakdown ===
- Points at home: 7
- Points away from home: 4
- 6 Points:
- 4 Points:
- 3 Points:
- 2 Points:
- 1 Point:
- 0 Points:

== Borgunarbikarinn ==
Stjarnan came into the Icelandic Cup, Borgunarbikarinn, in the 3rd round. The team was drawn against Víkingur Ó. Stjarnan won the game after a penalty shoot-out. The game had ended 2–2 after 90 minutes.

=== Matches ===
26 May 2016 3rd round	Stjarnan	2–2 (a.e.t.) (7–6 p)	Víkingur Ó.	Garðabær
20:00 GMT	Jeppe Hansen 59'; Guðjón Baldvinsson 89'; Baldur Sigurðsson (yellow card) 119'	Report	William Dominguez Da Silva 50'; Pape Mamadou Faye 60'; Pontus Nordenberg (yellow card) 104'	Stadium: Samsung völlurinn Referee: Ívar Orri Kristjánsson
	Penalties
	Guðjón Baldvinsson (penalty missed); Hilmar Árni Halldórsson (penalty scored); Hörður Árnason (penalty scored); Baldur Sigurðsson (penalty scored); Jeppe Hansen (penalty scored); Eyjólfur Héðinsson (penalty scored); Grétar Sigfinnur Sigurðarson (penalty scored); Jóhann Laxdal (penalty scored)		William Dominguez Da Silva (penalty scored); Þorsteinn Már Ragnarsson (penalty scored); Pontus Nordenberg (penalty scored); Pape Mamadou Faye (penalty missed); Egill Jónsson (penalty scored); Emir Dokara (penalty scored); Aleix Egea Acame (penalty scored); Alfreð Már Hjaltalín (penalty missed)

9 June 2016 Last 16	Stjarnan	0–2	ÍBV Vestmannaeyjar	Garðabær
19:30	Sigurðsson (yellow card) 85'	Summary	Punyed 17'; Sindri Snær Magnússon (yellow card) 41'; Bjarni Gunnarsson 49'	Stadium: Samsungvöllur; Referee: (Iceland) Petur Gudmundsson

== Statistics ==
=== Goalscorers ===
Includes all competitive matches.

As of match played 30 May 2016

Rank	Pos.	No.	Player	Úrvalsdeild	Borgunarbikar	Lengjubikar	Total
1	FW	10	(Iceland) Veigar Páll Gunnarsson	3	0	3	6
2	FW	7	(Iceland) Guðjón Baldvinsson	2	1	3	6
3	FW	19	(Denmark) Jeppe Hansen	2	1	3	6
4	MF	15	(Iceland) Hilmar Árni Halldórsson	1	0	3	4
5	MF	8	(Iceland) Baldur Sigurðsson	2	0	0	2
6	FW	17	(Iceland) Ólafur Karl Finsen	0	0	2	2
7	MF	11	(Iceland) Arnar Már Björgvinsson	1	0	1	2
8	DF	5	(Iceland) Grétar Sigfinnur Sigurðarson	0	0	1	1
9	DF	2	(Iceland) Brynjar Gauti Guðjónsson	0	0	1	1
10	DF	14	(Iceland) Hörður Árnason	0	0	1	1
11	MF	23	(Iceland) Halldór Orri Björnsson	1	0	0	1
12	FW	16	(Iceland) Ævar Ingi Jóhannesson	1	0	0	1

=== Goalkeeping ===
Includes all competitive matches.

As of match played 30 May 2016

Pos.	No.	Player	Games Played	Clean Sheets (%)	Goals Against
GK	1	(Jamaica) Duwayne Kerr	4	1 (25%)	3
GK	25	(Iceland) Hörður Fannar Björgvinsson	2	0 (0%)	5
GK	27	(Iceland) Guðjón Orri Sigurjónsson	2	0 (0%)	3
GK		(Iceland) Sveinn Sigurður Jóhannesson	5	2 (40%)	4

=== Appearances ===
Includes all competitive matches. Numbers in parentheses are sub appearances

As of match played 30 May 2016

No.	Pos.	Player	Úrvalsdeild	Borgunarbikar	Lengjubikar	Total
1	GK	(Jamaica) Duwayne Kerr	4	0	0	4
2	DF	(Iceland) Brynjar Gauti Guðjónsson	6	0	4	10
4	DF	(Iceland) Jóhann Laxdal	0	1	3 (1)	5
5	DF	(Iceland) Grétar Sigfinnur Sigurðarson	6	1	4	11
6	MF	(Iceland) Þorri Geir Rúnarsson	4 (1)	1	0	6
7	FW	(Iceland) Guðjón Baldvinsson	6	(1)	4 (1)	12
8	MF	(Iceland) Baldur Sigurðsson	6	1	1 (1)	9
9	DF	(Iceland) Daníel Laxdal	2	1	0	3
10	FW	(Iceland) Veigar Páll Gunnarsson	2 (3)	1	3 (2)	12
11	MF	(Iceland) Arnar Már Björgvinsson	(3)	1	3 (1)	8
12	DF	(Iceland) Heiðar Ægisson	6	0	4 (1)	11
14	DF	(Iceland) Hörður Árnason	6	1	4	11
15	MF	(Iceland) Hilmar Árni Halldórsson	2 (3)	1	5	11
16	FW	(Iceland) Ævar Ingi Jóhannesson	6	(1)	4 (1)	12
17	FW	(Iceland) Ólafur Karl Finsen	(1)	0	1 (3)	5
19	FW	(Denmark) Jeppe Hansen	1 (4)	1	2 (3)	11
20	MF	(Iceland) Eyjólfur Héðinsson	3	(1)	1 (1)	6
23	MF	(Iceland) Halldór Orri Björnsson	4 (2)	0	3 (1)	10
24	DF	(Iceland) Brynjar Már Björnsson	0	0	3 (1)	4
25	GK	(Iceland) Hörður Fannar Björgvinsson	1	1	0	2
27	GK	(Iceland) Guðjón Orri Sigurjónsson	0	0	1 (1)	2
28	MF	(Iceland) Kristófer Ingi Kristinsson	0	0	(1)	1
29	MF	(Iceland) Alex Þór Hauksson	0	0	(1)	1
	GK	(Iceland) Sveinn Sigurður Jóhannesson	1	0	4	5
	MF	(Iceland) Þórhallur Kári Knútsson	0	0	1 (4)	5
	MF	(Iceland) Kári Pétursson	0	0	(3)	3

=== Disciplinary ===
Includes all competitive matches.

As of match played 30 May 2016

No.	Pos.	Player	Yellow card	Second yellow card	Red card
2	DF	(Iceland) Brynjar Gauti Guðjónsson	1	0	0
5	DF	(Iceland) Grétar Sigfinnur Sigurðarson	1	0	0
6	MF	(Iceland) Þorri Geir Rúnarsson	1	0	0
7	FW	(Iceland) Guðjón Baldvinsson	3	0	0
8	MF	(Iceland) Baldur Sigurðsson	3	0	0
9	MF	(Iceland) Daníel Laxdal	1	0	0
12	DF	(Iceland) Heiðar Ægisson	1	0	0
16	MF	(Iceland) Ævar Ingi Jóhannesson	2	0	0
23	MF	(Iceland) Halldór Orri Björnsson	2	0	0

=== Squad Stats ===
Includes all competitive matches; Úrvalsdeild, Borgunarbikar and Lengjubikar.

	Úrvalsdeild	Borgunarbikar	Lengjubikar	Total
Games played	6	1	5	12
Games won	3	1	3	7 (58%)
Games drawn	2	0	0	2 (17%)
Games lost	1	0	2	3 (25%)
Goals scored	13	2	18	33
Goals conceded	6	2	7	15
Clean sheets	2	0	2	4
Yellow cards	11	1	3	15
Red cards	0	0	0	0

Last updated: 30 May 2016
Source: KSÍ
