= 2014 Stjarnan season =

Stjarnan
2014 season
- Manager: Rúnar Páll Sigmundsson
- Stadium: Samsung-völlurinn
- Úrvalsdeild: 1st
- Borgunarbikarinn: 16th-finals
- Lengjubikarinn: 8th-finals
- Top goalscorer: League: Ólafur Karl Finsen (11); All: Ólafur Karl Finsen (18)
Home colours	Away colours

The 2014 season was Stjarnan's 12th season in Úrvalsdeild and their 6th consecutive season.

Rúnar Páll Sigmundsson took over as head-coach on 23 October following the departure of Logi Ólafsson. This was Rúnar's first managerial job in Úrvalsdeild.

On 4 October Stjarnan won their first ever Úrvalsdeild title after winning FH in the final round. Stjarnan went through the season unbeaten and matched the record for points set by KR in 2013.

2014 season was Stjarnan's first season in Europe, playing in the Europa League Qualification. Stjarnan went through to the play-off round where they were defeated by Inter Milan.

Stjarnan were eliminated from both cup competitions in the knockout stages. Going out in the 8th-finals of Lengjubikar against eventual winners FH and in the 16th-finals of Borgunarbikar against Þróttur R.

== First Team ==
As of 17 November 2014. These players competed in Úrvalsdeild, Borgunarbikarinn, Lengjubikarinn and Europa League

Note: Flags indicate national team as defined under FIFA eligibility rules; some limited exceptions apply. Players may hold more than one non-FIFA nationality.

No.	Pos.	Nation	Player
1	GK	ISL	Ingvar Jónsson
2	DF	ISL	Jóhann Laxdal
4	DF	DEN	Niclas Vemmelund
5	MF	DEN	Michael Præst (captain)
6	MF	ISL	Hilmar Þór Hilmarsson (Joined Keflavík in July on loan)
7	MF	ISL	Atli Jóhannsson
8	MF	SLV	Pablo Punyed
9	DF	ISL	Daníel Laxdal
10	FW	ISL	Veigar Páll Gunnarsson
10	MF	ISL	Halldór Orri Björnsson (Joined Falkenbergs FF in March)
11	MF	ISL	Arnar Már Björgvinsson
12	MF	ISL	Heiðar Ægisson
14	DF	ISL	Hörður Árnason
15	DF	ISL	Aron Rúnarsson Heiðdal (Joined Keflavík in July on loan)

No.	Pos.	Nation	Player
16	MF	ISL	Þorri Geir Rúnarsson
17	FW	ISL	Ólafur Karl Finsen
18	FW	ISL	Jón Arnar Barðdal
19	FW	DEN	Jeppe Hansen (Joined FC Fredericia in July)
20	FW	ISL	Atli Freyr Ottesen Pálsson
21	DF	ISL	Baldvin Sturluson (Joined Breiðablik in July on loan)
22	MF	ISL	Þórhallur Kári Knútsson
23	FW	ISL	Snorri Páll Blöndal
24	FW	DEN	Rolf Toft
25	GK	ISL	Sveinn Sigurður Jóhannesson
27	FW	ISL	Garðar Jóhannsson
29	DF	DEN	Martin Rauschenberg
—	MF	ISL	Kristófer Konráðsson
—	MF	ISL	Kári Pétursson

=== Transfers in ===
Date	Position	No.	Player	From club	Ref
1 February 2014	MF	11	(Iceland) Arnar Már Björgvinsson	(Iceland) Breiðablik	
14 February 2014	MF	12	(Iceland) Heiðar Ægisson	(Iceland) Skínandi	
14 February 2014	FW	18	(Iceland) Jón Arnar Barðdal	(Iceland) Skínandi	
28 February 2014	DF	4	(Denmark) Niclas Vemmelund	(Denmark) Odense BK	
10 March 2014	DF	29	(Denmark) Martin Rauschenberg	(Denmark) Esbjerg fB	
17 March 2014	MF	8	(El Salvador) Pablo Punyed	(Iceland) Fylkir	
7 May 2014	FW	19	(Denmark) Jeppe Hansen	(Denmark) OB Odense	
15 July 2014	FW	24	(Denmark) Rolf Toft	(Denmark) AaB Fodbold	
16 July 2014	DF	2	(Iceland) Jóhann Laxdal	(Norway) Ullensaker/Kisa IL	

=== Transfers out ===
Date	Position	No.	Player	To club	Ref
3 November 2013	DF	3	(Iceland) Tryggvi Sveinn Bjarnason	(Iceland) Fram	
11 November 2013	MF	20	(Iceland) Gunnar Örn Jónsson	(Iceland) Fylkir	
11 December 2013	DF	24	(Norway) Robert Sandnes	(Norway) IK Start	
17 December 2013	GK		(Iceland) Hörður Fannar Björgvinsson	(Iceland) Fram	
30 January 2013	MF	26	(Denmark) Kennie Knak Chopart	(Denmark) FK Arendal	
31 January 2014	DF	4	(Iceland) Jóhann Laxdal	(Norway) Ullensaker/Kisa IL	
10 March 2014	MF	10	(Iceland) Halldór Orri Björnsson	(Sweden) Falkenbergs FF	
1 July 2014	FW	19	(Denmark) Jeppe Hansen	(Denmark) FC Fredericia	

=== Loans Out ===
Start Date	End Date	Position	No.	Player	To Club	Ref
10 January 2014	16 October 2014	GK	13	(Iceland) Arnar Darri Pétursson	(Iceland) Víkingur Ó	
23 July 2014	16 October 2014	DF	21	(Iceland) Baldvin Sturluson	(Iceland) Breiðablik	
25 July 2014	16 October 2014	MF	6	(Iceland) Hilmar Þór Hilmarsson	(Iceland) Keflavík	
30 July 2014	16 October 2014	DF	15	(Iceland) Aron Rúnarsson Heiðdal	(Iceland) Keflavík	

== Pre-season ==
=== Fótbolti.net Cup ===
Stjarnan took part in the Fótbolti.net cup, a pre-season tournament for clubs outside of Reykjavík, in January and won the tournament after a final against FH. Stjarnan were drawn in Group 2 with Haukar, ÍBV and ÍA. They topped the group with six points, two wins and a defeat, and went through to the final against FH which they won 3–1 with two goals from Halldór Orri and one from Heiðar Ægisson.

Date	Round	Opponents	Stadium	Result F–A	Scorers
11 January 2014	Group stage	ÍBV	Kórinn	2–1	Garðar Jó 37' Darri Steinn 85'
18 January 2014	Group stage	Haukar	Kórinn	3–4	
21 January 2014	Group stage	ÍA	Kórinn	3–2	
28 January 2014	Final	FH	Kórinn	3–1	Halldór Orri 51' 65' Heiðar Æ 53'

== Lengjubikarinn ==
Stjarnan were drawn in group 3 in the Icelandic league cup, Lengjubikarinn, with Víkingur R, ÍBV, Valur, Selfoss, KV, Víkingur Ó and Haukar. They finished top of the group with 17 points, 5 wins and 2 draws. In the quarter-finals Stjarnan were drawn against FH and lost the game 2–1, Veigar Páll scored Stjarnan's only goal.

=== Matches ===
Date	Round	Opponents	Stadium	Result F–A	Scorers
16 February 2014	Group stage	Víkingur R	Egilshöll	2–2	Veigar Páll 57'(p) Heiðar Æ 85'
25 February 2014	Group stage	Haukar	Kórinn	5–0	Arnar Már 19' Halldór Orri 33' OG 36' Veigar Páll 61' Jón Arnar 71'
6 March 2014	Group stage	KV	Egilshöll	1–1	Þorri Geir 61'
15 March 2014	Group stage	ÍBV	Reykjaneshöllin	1–0	Arnar Már 77'
21 March 2014	Group stage	Selfoss	Samsung-völlurinn	3–2	Arnar Már 8' Jón Arnar 31' Heiðar Æ 68'
6 April 2014	Group stage	Valur	Samsung-völlurinn	2–1	Veigar Páll 7' 87'
12 April 2014	Group stage	Víkingur Ó	Samsung-völlurinn	4–0	Heiðar Æ 14' Snorri Páll 74' Baldvin 77' Veigar Páll 88'
16 April 2014	Quarter-finals	FH	Samsung-völlurinn	1–2	Veigar Páll 48'

== Borgunarbikarinn ==
Stjarnan entered Borgunarbikarinn in the 32nd-finals where they were drawn against Selfoss. Stjarnan won the match convincingly 6–0. In the next round they were eliminated by Þróttur R 1–0.

=== Matches ===
Date	Round	Opponents	Stadium	Result F–A	Scorers
25 May 2014	32nd-finals	Selfoss	Samsung-völlurinn	6–0	Baldvin S 3' 64' Ólafur Karl 15' 66' O.G. 58' Atli Freyr 84'
18 June 2014	16th-finals	Þróttur R	Samsung-völlurinn	0–1	

== Úrvalsdeild ==
=== Table ===
Pos	Team	Pld	W	D	L	GF	GA	GD	Pts	Qualification or relegation
1	Stjarnan (C)	22	15	7	0	42	21	+21	52	Qualification for the Champions League second qualifying round
2	FH	22	15	6	1	46	17	+29	51	Qualification for the Europa League first qualifying round (Note: The 2014 Icelandic Cup winner, KR, qualifies for 2015–16 UEFA Europa League first qualifying round.)
3	KR	22	13	4	5	40	24	+16	43	Qualification for the Europa League first qualifying round
4	Víkingur Reykjavík	22	9	3	10	25	29	−4	30	Qualification for the Europa League first qualifying round
5	Valur	22	8	4	10	31	36	−5	28	
6	Fylkir	22	8	4	10	34	40	−6	28	
7	Breiðablik	22	5	12	5	36	33	+3	27	
8	Keflavík	22	6	7	9	29	32	−3	25	
9	Fjölnir	22	5	8	9	33	36	−3	23	
10	ÍBV	22	5	7	10	28	38	−10	22	
11	Fram (R)	22	6	3	13	30	48	−18	21	Relegation to 1. deild karla
12	Þór A. (R)	22	3	3	16	24	44	−20	12	Relegation to 1. deild karla

Source: KSÍ
Rules for classification: 1) points; 2) goal difference; 3) number of goals scored.
(C) Champions; (R) Relegated

=== Matches ===
Win Draw Loss Upcoming fixture

4 May 2014 1	Stjarnan	1–0	Fylkir	Garðabær
19:15 GMT	Ólafur Karl Finsen (85(p.))	Report		Stadium: Samsung-völlurinn; Attendance: 1235; Referee: Þóroddur Hjaltalín

8 May 2014 2	ÍBV	1–2	Stjarnan	Vestmannaeyjar
17:00 GMT	Arnar Bragi Bergsson (85(p.))	Report	Ólafur Karl Finsen 45'; O.G. 65'	Stadium: Hásteinsvöllur; Attendance: 516; Referee: Gunnar Jarl Jónsson

12 May 2014 3	Stjarnan	0–0	Víkingur R	Garðabær
19:15 GMT		Report		Stadium: Samsung-völlurinn; Attendance: 931; Referee: Vilhjálmur Alvar Þórarinsson

18 May 2014 4	Þór	3–4	Stjarnan	Akureyri
17:00 GMT	Shawn Robert Nicklaw 44'; Sigurður Marinó Kristjánsson 68'; Jóhann Helgi Hannesson 78'	Report	Arnar Már Björgvinsson 26'; Ólafur Karl Finsen 43'; Jeppe Hansen 48'; Veigar Páll Gunnarsson 53'	Stadium: Þórsvöllur; Attendance: 611; Referee: Þorvaldur Árnason

22 May 2014 5	Stjarnan	1–1	Valur	Garðabær
19:15 GMT	Arnar Már Björgvinsson 20'	Report	Kolbeinn Kárason 90+2'	Stadium: Samsung-völlurinn; Attendance: 965; Referee: Þóroddur Hjaltalín

2 June 2014 6	Breiðablik	1–1	Stjarnan	Kópavogur
20:00 GMT	Elvar Páll Sigurðsson 74'	Report	Niclas Vemmelund 19'	Stadium: Kópavogsvöllur; Attendance: 1250; Referee: Kristinn Jakobsson

11 June 2014 7	Stjarnan	2–1	KR	Garðabær
20:00 GMT	Ólafur Karl Finsen 38'; Jeppe Hansen 42'	Report	Grétar Sigfinnur Sigurðarson 20'	Stadium: Samsung-völlurinn; Attendance: 1313; Referee: Gunnar Jarl Jónsson

15 June 2014 8	Keflavík	2–2	Stjarnan	Keflavík
20:00 GMT	Sindri Snær Magnússon 50' 68'	Report	Jeppe Hansen 61'; Ólafur Karl Finsen (66(p.))	Stadium: Nettóvöllurinn; Attendance: 950; Referee: Garðar Örn Hinriksson

22 June 2014 9	Stjarnan	2–1	Fjölnir	Garðabær
19:15 GMT	Jeppe Hansen 17'; Garðar Jóhannsson 90'	Report	Bergsveinn Ólafsson 55'	Stadium: Samsung-völlurinn; Attendance: 789; Referee: Vilhjálmur Alvar Þórarinsson

27 June 2014 10	Fram	1–2	Stjarnan	Reykjavík
19:15 GMT	Ásgeir Marteinsson 3'	Report	Jeppe Hansen 65' 83'	Stadium: Laugardalsvöllur; Attendance: 508; Referee: Þorvaldur Árnason

13 July 2014 11	Stjarnan	2–2	FH	Garðabær
16:00 GMT	Arnar Már Björgvinsson 34'; Veigar Páll Gunnarsson 82'	Report	Atli Viðar Björnsson 23'; O.G. 67'	Stadium: Samsung-völlurinn; Attendance: 1213; Referee: Garðar Örn Hinriksson

20 July 2014 12	Fylkir	1–3	Stjarnan	Reykjavík
20:00 GMT	Ásgeir Örn Arnþórsson 45'	Report	Arnar Már Björgvinsson 35'; Rolf Toft 37'; Niclas Vemmelund 81'	Stadium: Fylkisvöllur; Attendance: 846; Referee: Kristinn Jakobsson

27 July 2014 13	Stjarnan	2–0	ÍBV	Garðabær
17:00 GMT	Ólafur Karl Finsen 29'; Garðar Jóhannsson 90+4'	Report		Stadium: Samsung-völlurinn; Attendance: 813; Referee: Valdimar Pálsson

18 September 2014 14	Víkingur R	0–1	Stjarnan	Reykjavík
17:00 GMT		Report	Rolf Toft 35'	Stadium: Víkingsvöllur; Attendance: 1123; Referee: Kristinn Jakobsson

11 August 2014 15	Stjarnan	2–1	Þór	Garðabær
20:00 GMT	Arnar Már Björgvinsson 37'; Pablo Punyed 90+3'	Report	Shawn Robert Nicklaw 47'	Stadium: Samsung-völlurinn; Attendance: 772; Referee: Vilhjálmur Alvar Þórarinsson

15 August 2014 16	Valur	1–2	Stjarnan	Reykjavík
18:30 GMT	Patrick Pedersen 90+3'	Report	Arnar Már Björgvinsson 42'; Rolf Toft 53'	Stadium: Vodafonevöllurinn; Attendance: 828; Referee: Örvar Sær Gíslason

24 August 2014 17	Stjarnan	2–2	Breiðablik	Garðabær
19:15 GMT	Ólafur Karl Finsen (44(p.)); Veigar Páll Gunnarsson 83'	Report	Guðjón Pétur Lýðsson 49'; Damir Muminovic 52'	Stadium: Samsung-völlurinn; Attendance: 855; Referee: Garðar Örn Hinriksson

31 August 2014 18	KR	2–3	Stjarnan	Reykjavík
18:00 GMT	Aron Bjarki Jósepsson 19'; Óskar Örn Hauksson 76'	Report	Veigar Páll Gunnarsson 61'; Ólafur Karl Finsen 70' 87'	Stadium: KR-völlur; Attendance: 1532; Referee: Þorvaldur Árnason

14 September 2014 19	Stjarnan	2–0	Keflavík	Garðabær
20:00 GMT	Pablo Punyed 25'; Veigar Páll Gunnarsson 90'	Report		Stadium: Samsung-völlurinn; Attendance: 770; Referee: Þóroddur Hjaltalín

23 September 2014 20	Fjölnir	0–0	Stjarnan	Reykjavík
16:30 GMT		Report		Stadium: Fjölnisvöllur; Attendance: 954; Referee: Garðar Örn Hinriksson

28 September 2014 21	Stjarnan	4–0	Fram	Garðabær
14:00 GMT	Rolf Toft 5' 18' 72'; Veigar Páll Gunnarsson 27'	Report		Stadium: Samsung-völlurinn; Attendance: 1006; Referee: Þóroddur Hjaltalín

4 October 2014 22	FH	1–2	Stjarnan	Hafnarfjörður
16:00 GMT	Steven Lennon 64'	Report	Ólafur Karl Finsen 40' (90+2(p.))	Stadium: Kaplakrikavöllur; Attendance: 6450; Referee: Kristinn Jakobsson

=== Summary of Results ===
Overall								Home						Away					
Pld	W	D	L	GF	GA	GD	Pts	W	D	L	GF	GA	GD	W	D	L	GF	GA	GD
22	15	7	0	42	21	+21	52	7	4	0	20	8	+12	8	3	0	22	13	+9

Last updated: 1 December 2014.
Source: KSÍ

=== Points breakdown ===
- Points at home: 25
- Points away from home: 27
- 6 Points: ÍBV, Fylkir, Þór, KR, Fram
- 4 Points: Valur, Keflavík, Fjölnir, FH
- 3 Points: Víkingur R
- 2 Points: Breiðablik

== Europa League ==
Stjarnan took part in their first ever Europa League Qualification in 2014. They entered the qualification in the first round where they were drawn against the Welsh team Bangor City. Stjarnan won the two legged tie 8–0 and went on to the second round. They met the Scottish team Motherwell in the second round. After coming from 2–0 down in the first leg to earn a 2–2 draw Stjarnan won the second leg 3–2 after an extra-time wonder goal from Atli Jóhannsson. In the third round Rolf Toft scored the only goal over the 180 minutes against Lech Poznan to put Stjarnan through 1–0 on aggregate. Stjarnan were drawn against the Italian team Inter Milan in the play-off round. Stjarnan were unable to maintain their good form in the Europa League and lost the tie 9–0 on aggregate, 3–0 at home and 6–0 in Milan.

=== Matches ===
Date	Round	Opponents	Stadium	Result F–A	Scorers
3 July 2014	First Round – First Leg	Bangor City	Samsung-völlurinn	4–0	Ólafur Karl 13' 54'(p.) Veigar Páll 16' Arnar Már 70'
10 July 2014	First Round – Second Leg	Bangor City	Nantporth	4–0	Rauschenberg 53' Arnar Már 68' 81' Atli Jó 85'
17 July 2014	Second Round – First Leg	Motherwell	Fir Park	2–2	Ólafur Karl 35'(p.) 90+2'(p.)
24 July 2014	Second Round – Second Leg	Motherwell	Samsung-völlurinn	3–2 E.T.	Ólafur Karl 38'(p.) Rolf Toft 85' Atli Jó 114'E.T.
31 July 2014	Third Round – First Leg	Lech Poznan	Samsung-völlurinn	3–2	Rolf Toft 48'
7 August 2014	Second Round – Second Leg	Lech Poznan	Municipal Stadium	0–0	
20 August 2014	Play-off Round – First Leg	Inter Milan	Laugardalsvöllur	0–3	
28 August 2014	Play-off Round – Second Leg	Inter Milan	Stadio Giuseppe Meazza	0–6	

== Statistics ==
=== Appearances ===
Includes all competitive matches; Úrvalsdeild, Borgunarbikar, Lengjubikar and Europa League.

Numbers in parentheses are sub appearances.

No.	Pos.	Nation	Name	Úrvalsdeild	Borgunarbikar	Lengjubikar	Europa League	Total
1	GK	(Iceland)	Ingvar Jónsson	21	2	8	8	39
2	DF	(Iceland)	Jóhann Laxdal	3 (2)	0	0	(2)	7
4	DF	(Denmark)	Niclas Vemmelund	17 (1)	0	6	7	31
5	MF	(Denmark)	Michael Præst	12	2	6	6	26
6	MF	(Iceland)	Hilmar Þór Hilmarsson	0	(1)	1 (5)	0	7
7	MF	(Iceland)	Atli Jóhannsson	17 (4)	0	4	8	33
8	MF	(El Salvador)	Pablo Punyed	15 (5)	2	3 (1)	8	34
9	DF	(Iceland)	Daníel Laxdal	22	2	8	8	40
10	FW	(Iceland)	Veigar Páll Gunnarsson	14 (3)	1 (1)	7	5 (1)	32
10	MF	(Iceland)	Halldór Orri Björnsson	0	0	2	0	2
11	MF	(Iceland)	Arnar Már Björgvinsson	21	1	5	7 (1)	35
12	MF	(Iceland)	Heiðar Ægisson	6 (7)	0	7	(5)	25
14	DF	(Iceland)	Hörður Árnason	19	1	5	8	33
15	DF	(Iceland)	Aron Rúnarsson Heiðdal	0	(1)	2 (2)	0	5
16	MF	(Iceland)	Þorri Geir Rúnarsson	12 (4)	2	3 (3)	1 (2)	27
17	FW	(Iceland)	Ólafur Karl Finsen	20 (1)	2	6 (1)	8	38
18	FW	(Iceland)	Jón Arnar Barðdal	(4)	(1)	4 (3)	0	12
19	FW	(Denmark)	Jeppe Hansen	9	1 (1)	0	0	11
20	FW	(Iceland)	Atli Freyr Ottesen Pálsson	2 (6)	1 (1)	3 (4)	1 (2)	20
21	DF	(Iceland)	Baldvin Sturluson	(1)	2	2 (4)	1	10
22	MF	(Iceland)	Þórhallur Kári Knútsson	(1)	0	(1)	0	2
23	FW	(Iceland)	Snorri Páll Blöndal	(4)	0	1 (3)	(1)	9
24	FW	(Denmark)	Rolf Toft	10 (1)	0	0	3 (3)	17
25	GK	(Iceland)	Sveinn Sigurður Jóhannesson	1 (1)	0	(2)	0	4
27	FW	(Iceland)	Garðar Jóhannsson	(9)	1	0	1 (3)	14
29	DF	(Denmark)	Martin Rauschenberg	21	2	5	8	36
	MF	(Iceland)	Kristófer Konráðsson	0	0	(1)	0	1
	MF	(Iceland)	Kári Pétursson	0	0	(2)	0	2

=== Goal scorers ===
Includes all competitive matches; Úrvalsdeild, Borgunarbikar, Lengjubikar and Europa League.

No.	Pos.	Nation	Name	Úrvalsdeild	Borgunarbikar	Lengjubikar	Europa League	Total
17	FW	(Iceland)	Ólafur Karl Finsen	11	2	0	5	18
24	FW	(Denmark)	Rolf Toft	6	0	0	2	8
19	FW	(Denmark)	Jeppe Hansen	6	0	0	0	6
11	MF	(Iceland)	Arnar Már Björgvinsson	6	0	3	3	12
10	FW	(Iceland)	Veigar Páll Gunnarsson	6	0	6	1	13
8	MF	(El Salvador)	Pablo Punyed	2	0	0	0	2
4	DF	(Denmark)	Niclas Vemmelund	2	0	0	0	2
27	FW	(Iceland)	Garðar Jóhannsson	2	0	0	0	2
21	DF	(Iceland)	Baldvin Sturluson	0	2	1	0	3
21	FW	(Iceland)	Atli Freyr Ottesen Pálsson	0	1	0	0	1
10	MF	(Iceland)	Halldór Orri Björnsson	0	0	1	0	1
12	MF	(Iceland)	Heiðar Ægisson	0	0	3	0	3
18	FW	(Iceland)	Jón Arnar Barðdal	0	0	2	0	3
23	FW	(Iceland)	Snorri Páll Blöndal	0	0	1	0	1
16	MF	(Iceland)	Þorri Geir Rúnarsson	0	0	1	0	1
7	MF	(Iceland)	Atli Jóhannsson	0	0	0	2	2
29	DF	(Denmark)	Martin Rauschenberg	0	0	0	1	1
Own Goals				1	1	1	0	3
TOTAL				42	6	20	14	82

Last updated: 4 December 2014
Source: KSÍ

=== Disciplinary record ===
Includes all competitive matches; Úrvalsdeild, Borgunarbikar, Lengjubikar and Europa League.

N	P	Nat.	Name	Úrvalsdeild			Borgunarbikar			Lengjubikar			Europa League			Total			Notes
N	P	Nat.	Name	Yellow card	Second yellow card	Red card	Yellow card	Second yellow card	Red card	Yellow card	Second yellow card	Red card	Yellow card	Second yellow card	Red card	Yellow card	Second yellow card	Red card	Notes
4	DF	(Denmark)	Niclas Vemmelund	4						1			1			6			
5	MF	(Denmark)	Michael Præst	4		1				1		1	1			6		2	
7	MF	(Iceland)	Atli Jóhannsson	3		1										3		1	
8	MF	(El Salvador)	Pablo Punyed	4									1			5			
9	DF	(Iceland)	Daníel Laxdal	2						1						3			
10	FW	(Iceland)	Veigar Páll Gunnarsson			1				1						1		1	
11	MF	(Iceland)	Arnar Már Björgvinsson	2												2			
14	DF	(Iceland)	Hörður Árnason										1			1			
15	DF	(Iceland)	Aron Rúnarsson Heiðdal							1						1			
16	MF	(Iceland)	Þorri Geir Rúnarsson	1			1									2			
17	FW	(Iceland)	Ólafur Karl Finsen	6						1						7			
19	FW	(Denmark)	Jeppe Hansen	1												1			
24	FW	(Denmark)	Rolf Toft	3									1			4			
29	DF	(Denmark)	Martin Rauschenberg	1		1				1			2			4		1	

Last updated: 4 December 2014
Source: KSÍ
Ordered by (red card) , (second yellow card) and (yellow card)
(yellow card) = Number of bookings; (second yellow card) = Number of sending offs after a second yellow card; (red card) = Number of sending offs by a direct red card.

=== Squad Stats ===
Includes all competitive matches; Úrvalsdeild, Borgunarbikar, Lengjubikar and Europa League.

	Úrvalsdeild	Borgunarbikar	Lengjubikar	Europa League	Total
Games played	22	2	8	8	40
Games won	15	1	5	4	25
Games drawn	7	0	2	2	11
Games lost	0	1	1	2	4
Goals scored	42	6	19	14	81
Goals conceded	21	1	8	13	43
Clean sheets	7	1	3	4	15
Yellow cards	31	1	7	7	46
Red cards	4	0	1	0	5

Last updated: 31 October
Source: KSÍ
