= Kristófer Kristinsson =

Icelandic footballer (born 1999)

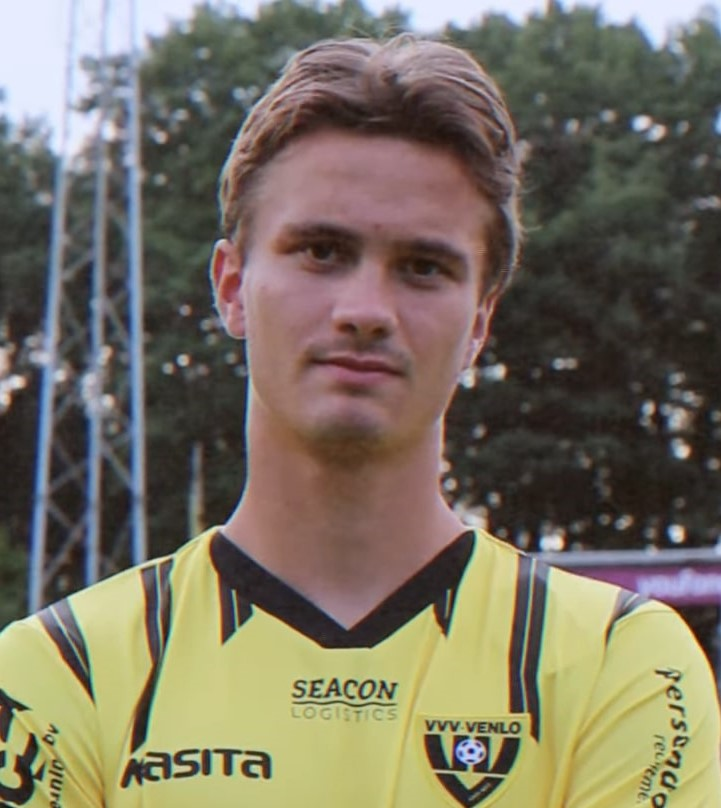
- Kristófer in 2022

Personal information
- Full name: Kristófer Ingi Kristinsson
- Date of birth: 7 April 1999 (age 27)
- Place of birth: Garðabær, Iceland
- Height: 1.90 m (6 ft 3 in)
- Position: Forward

Team information
- Current team: Breiðablik
- Number: 23

Youth career
- –2015: Stjarnan

Senior career*
Years	Team	Apps	(Gls)
2015–2016	Stjarnan	0	(0)
2017–2019	Willem II	16	(2)
2019–2021	Grenoble	6	(0)
2020–2021	→ Jong PSV (loan)	32	(8)
2021–2022	SønderjyskE	22	(0)
2022–2023	VVV-Venlo	14	(0)
2023–	Breiðablik	64	(22)

International career
2013–2014	Iceland U15	6	(1)
2015	Iceland U16	7	(0)
2015–2016	Iceland U17	8	(0)
2017	Iceland U19	5	(1)
2018–2020	Iceland U21	7	(0)
- * Club domestic league appearances and goals as of 1 November 2026

Kristófer Ingi Kristinsson (born 7 April 1999) is an Icelandic professional footballer who plays as a forward for Breiðablik.

== Club career ==
=== Stjarnan ===
A product of the Stjarnan youth academy, Kristófer grew to become an Icelandic youth international while playing for their youth teams. He attracted the interest of Eredivisie club SC Heerenveen, trialling with the side in 2014. At the age of 16, he made his debut as a substitute for Stjarnan's first team during a 3–2 away loss to Keflavík on 9 March 2016 in the Icelandic League Cup.

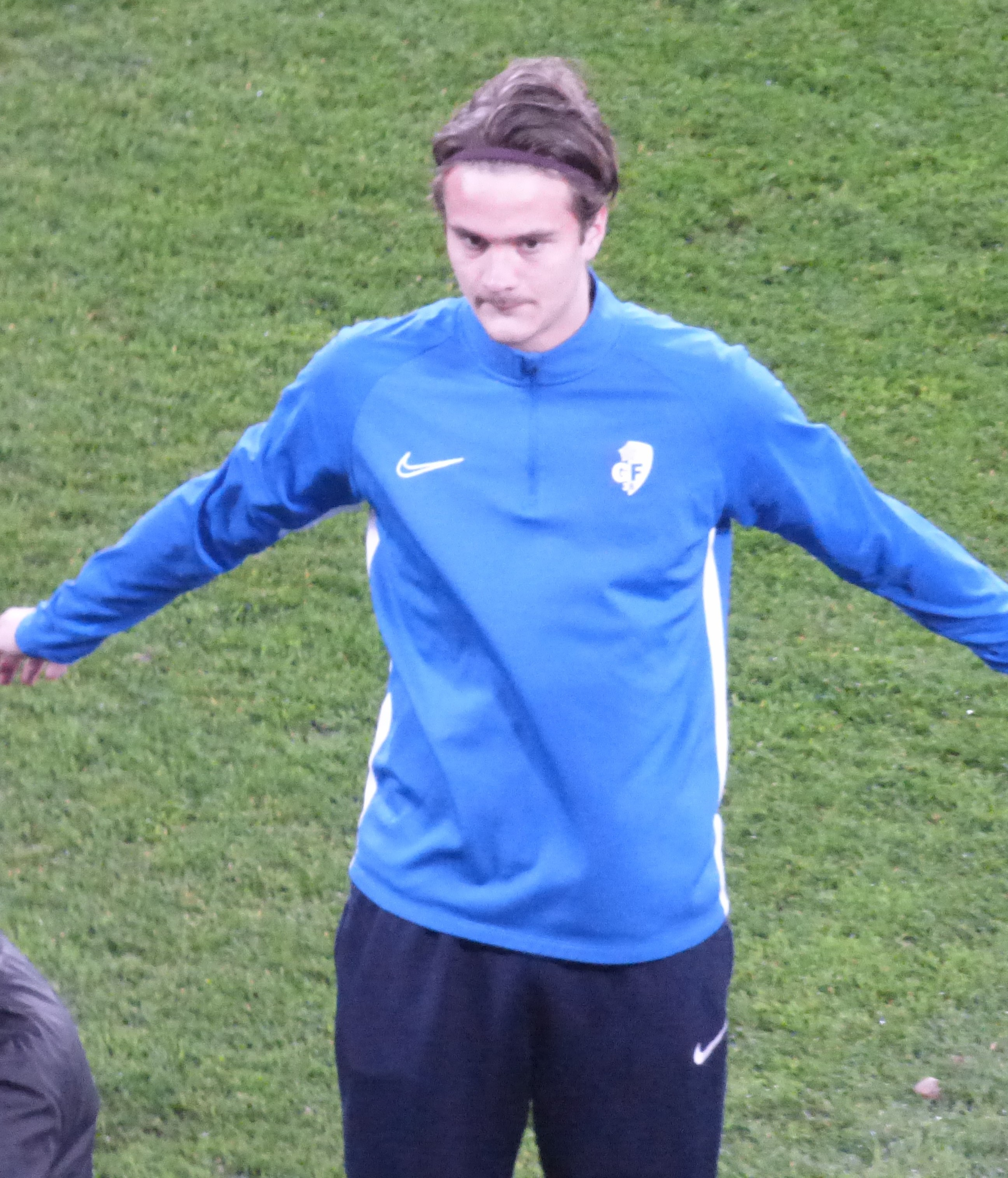
Kristófer in 2020

=== Willem II ===
On 12 July 2016, Kristófer signed a three-year contract with Eredivisie club Willem II, making his league debut on 25 February 2018 during a 1–0 home win over Roda JC Kerkrade, replacing Bartholomew Ogbeche in injury time. He scored his first goal for the club, as well as his first goal in professional football, on 15 September 2018 in a league match against Excelsior, completing Willem II's late comeback by scoring the 2–2 equalizer.

=== Grenoble ===
Kristófer refused to extend his expiring contract with Willem II in 2019 and, despite interest from PSV Eindhoven, opted to sign with French Ligue 2 club Grenoble on 18 June 2019. He made his debut for the club on 8 November 2019, replacing Florian Raspentino in the 76th minute of a 0–0 draw against Le Mans.

One year after joining Grenoble, he would move to PSV after all, when he was sent on a one-season loan to their reserve team Jong PSV competing in the second-tier Eerste Divisie. With eight goals in 32 appearances, Kristófer became the top goalscorer for Jong PSV in the 2020–21 season.

=== SønderjyskE ===
On 25 July 2021, Kristófer signed a three-year contract with Danish Superliga club SønderjyskE. He made his debut for the club the following day, coming off the bench for Jeppe Simonsen in the 77th minute in a 1–0 home win in the league. Kristófer had limited success at the club, scoring no goals in 20 league appearances, as SønderjyskE suffered relegation to the Danish 1st Division in the 2021–22 season. On 1 September 2022, the club confirmed that they had terminated Kristófer's contract after mutual agreement.

=== VVV-Venlo ===
On 5 September 2022, Kristófer joined Eerste Divisie club VVV-Venlo on a one-year contract, with an option for an additional season. He made his debut for VVV against his former club Jong PSV on 16 September, replacing Nick Venema in the 63rd minute of a 1–1 home draw at De Koel. He left VVV at the end of the season, as his contract was not extended.

=== Breiðablik ===
On 4 August 2023, Kristófer joined Breiðablik until the end of 2023. He made his first ever European appearance for Breiðablik on 31 August, replacing Klæmint Olsen in the 75th minute of the play-off round of the UEFA Europa Conference League, which ended in a 1–0 victory over Struga. This win secured Breiðablik becoming the first Icelandic football club to play in the group stage of a major UEFA-organised European competition.

== Career statistics ==
=== Club ===
As of match played 28 September 2023

Appearances and goals by club, season and competition
Club	Season	League			National cup (Note: Includes KNVB Cup, Danish Cup)		Europe		Other		Total	
Club	Season	Division	Apps	Goals	Apps	Goals	Apps	Goals	Apps	Goals	Apps	Goals
Stjarnan	2016	Úrvalsdeild	0	0	0	0	—		1 (Note: Appearance in Icelandic League Cup)	0	1	0
Willem II	2017–18	Eredivisie	2	0	0	0	—		—		2	0
Willem II	2018–19	Eredivisie	11	1	3	1	—		—		14	2
Willem II	Total		13	1	3	1	—		—		16	2
Grenoble	2019–20	Ligue 2	6	0	0	0	—		—		6	0
Grenoble	2020–21	Ligue 2	0	0	0	0	—		—		0	0
Grenoble	Total		6	0	0	0	—		—		6	0
Jong PSV	2020–21	Eerste Divisie	32	8	—		—		—		32	8
SønderjyskE	2021–22	Danish Superliga	20	0	5	4	—		—		25	4
SønderjyskE	2022–23	Danish 1st Division	2	0	1	0	—		—		3	0
SønderjyskE	Total		22	0	6	4	—		—		28	4
VVV-Venlo	2022–23	Eerste Divisie	14	0	2	0	—		2 (Note: Appearances in Eredivisie promotion/relegation playoffs)	0	18	0
Breiðablik	2023	Besta deild	6	2	—		1 (Note: Appearance in UEFA Europa Conference League)	0	—		7	2
Career total			93	11	11	5	1	0	3	0	108	16
