= 2011 transfer of Veigar Páll Gunnarsson =

Football controversy in Norway

In the summer of 2011, Veigar Páll Gunnarsson transferred from Stabæk to Vålerenga. It was later claimed that Stabæk accepted an offer from Vålerenga for Gunnarsson on 1 million NOK, while Rosenborg offered 5 million for Gunnarsson. At the same time, Vålerenga bought an option for Stabæk's 16-year-old Herman Stengel priced at 4 million. The contracted sum of this transfer was proportional to the sum that AS Nancy would receive, as a result from the contract of the Gunnarsson transfer in 2009, when Gunnarsson transferred between football clubs AS Nancy and Vålerenga — AS Nancy was to receive 50 percent of the transfer fee next time Gunnarsson was transferred to another club.

The clubs Stabæk and Vålerenga were later fined 500,000 and 350,000 Norwegian kroner respectively, by a committee (påtalenemd) of Football Association of Norway. Thereafter a police investigation started.

In the subsequent trial, all of the defendants were acquitted, and the Norwegian state later paid them compensation in connection with the prosecution. Some of the acquitted defendants subsequently brought claims against the Norwegian Football Association, which settled the claims out of court and paid compensation.

== Media reports ==
On 12 October 2011, TV 2 reported that Gunnarsson had been transferred to Vålerenga for NOK 1 million, while Vålerenga had paid NOK 4 million for an option to sign the 15-year-old footballer Herman Stengel. In 2013 Finansavisen said that "In addition the club in Oslo would have to pay Norwegian kroner 12.5 million or 15 million for the player himself, depending on when Vålerenga fetched the 16-year old." Furthermore, the newspaper quoted påtalenemden: "Transfers with such sums are unknown in Norway, with a possible exception for John Carew's transfer from Vålerenga to RBK. - As late as a half year before the option agreement with Vålerenga was signed, Stabæk was evaluating if they 'should use Norwegian kroner 250000 on a 15-year old with a potential for being resold [with a profit] (salgspotensial),' according to a report from the athletic committee of the team from Bærum. Thereafter Stengel is mentioned only once—that he is considering signing on to Stabæk—in the styreprotokoller (recorded notes of the board of directors) and in the referater (recorded notes of meetings) of the athletic commission, according to påtalenemda." The committee described this as remarkable because the option agreement immediately provided Stabæk with four times the amount recorded for the Gunnarsson transfer; it also noted the club’s financial difficulties at the time.

=== Transfer fees offered by Rosenborg ===
TV 2 also claimed that Stabæk declined an offer of 5 million NOK from Rosenborg for Gunnarsson. On 8 November 2011, TV 2 reported that Rosenborg had offered NOK 1 million for Gunnarsson and NOK 4.25 million for his Swedish teammate Johan Andersson, who had six months remaining on his contract.

== Settlement of AS Nancy's compensation claim ==
It was alleged that the transfer arrangement between Stabæk and Vålerenga resulted in AS Nancy receiving a reduced share of the transfer fee. In October 2011, Nancy asked for a resolution in trying to reclaim €250,000, since Rosenborg BK had put an option for 5 million NOK (€500,000). Nancy settled their civil claim with Stabæk on 17 November 2011.

== Nomination of fines by Football Association of Norway ==
A committee of Football Association of Norway(NFF) — nominated clubs Stabæk and Vålerenga to fines of Norwegian kroner 500 000 and 350 000 respectively, while Erik Loe, Inge André Olsen and Truls Haakonsen were nominated to be banned from holding positions within NFF for a period of 18 months, 18 months and 12 months respectively.

== Police investigation ==
Police started an investigation against clubs Stabæk, Vålerenga and Rosenborg in November 2011, after having interviewed NFF's påtalenemnda. Olsen and Haakonsen were arrested and charged with aggravated breach of trust - grov økonomisk utroskap - on 30 November. On the same day, The National Authority for Investigation and Prosecution of Economic and Environmental Crime (Økokrim) was securing evidences at both Vålerenga's and Stabæk's offices.

On 16 December 2011, the police also charged Erik Loe, former chairman of Stabæk Fotball, and Lars Holter-Sørensen, chairman of Stabæk AS, with breach of trust.

The police announced on 3 January 2012 that they had charged a fifth person, a lawyer which is a board member of Stabæk Fotball ASA.

== Criticism of Stabæk's ranking on the Fair Play table ==
On 2 December 2011, NFF released the Fair Play table for the 2011 Tippeligaen with Stabæk positioned on a fourth place, behind Tromsø, Molde and Rosenborg. Since the three first teams on the Norwegian Fair Play rank already have qualified for European competition, Stabæk will receive a berth in the first qualifying round of 2012–13 UEFA Europa League if Norway are among the top three nations on UEFA Fair Play ranking which will be released in May 2012.

Roald Bruun-Hansen, the managing director of Brann aid that awarding a Fair Play berth to a club under investigation for alleged financial misconduct was inconsistent with his understanding of fair play, and suggested that Sarpsborg 08 should receive the berth if Stabæk were found responsible. Svein Graff, the NFF’s communications director, told TV 2 that the association was open to reconsidering Stabæk’s Fair Play berth and that clubs in other European countries had been excluded from UEFA competitions after being found responsible for administrative or regulatory violations. The Stabæk-player Mikkel Diskerud claimed that the team had been treated unfairly by the NFF.

== Trial ==
The trial is scheduled to start on 19 August 2013 with four defendants: Inge André Olsen, Truls Haakonsen, Lars Holter Sørensen (a former chairman of the board of Stabæk Fotball AS) and Tor Qvarfordt Aaserød (a former member of the board of directors Stabæk Fotball AS). The fines (from the police) which have not been accepted will be a part of the trial: Stabæk Fotball (Norwegian kroner 100.000) and Stabæk Fotball AS (200.000).

No one was convicted in the trial.

== Reactions to the case ==
In a 2016 Dagbladet article Håvard Melnæs, the chief editor of Josimar (a football magazine), said that when Josimar started scrutinizing the transfer case in 2015, "we did not know that Jim Solbakken had such a central role. Solbakken said to TV that he did not take a part in the Veigar Páll Gunnarsson transfer to Vålerenga. According to Josimar’s investigation, Jim Solbakken’s name appeared frequently in connection with the transfer case. And during the work with the documentary, it became more and more clear that Jim Solbakken played a central role in the transfer. He acted as agent for Veigar Pall Gunnarson's agent for a while, he was Herman Stengel's agent, he represented Vålerenga in Gunnarsson's transfer from Stabæk, he was Stabæk's agent for a possible future transfer of Stengel, he was a go-between on Stabæk's behalf when they wanted to settle with Nancy, and he represented Nancy when Stabæk wanted to settle with the French club". Furthermore, Melnæs says that "In 2014 we wrote that Solbakken was on both sides of the table during several transfers, something that is a violation of the rules for agents, and documented this".

=== 2016 documentary film ===
The 2016 documentary film, Frifinnelsen, said that lawyer Erik Flågan in 2011 threatened lawyer Gunnar Martin Kjenner and sport blogger Andreas Selliaas, in connection with the transfer case; in 2016 reports indicated that Flågan declined to disclose whom he was working for.

== Film ==
On 23 June 2016, a television documentary, Frifinnelsen, was shown on TV2.
