= Inge André Olsen =

Norwegian footballer (born 1978)

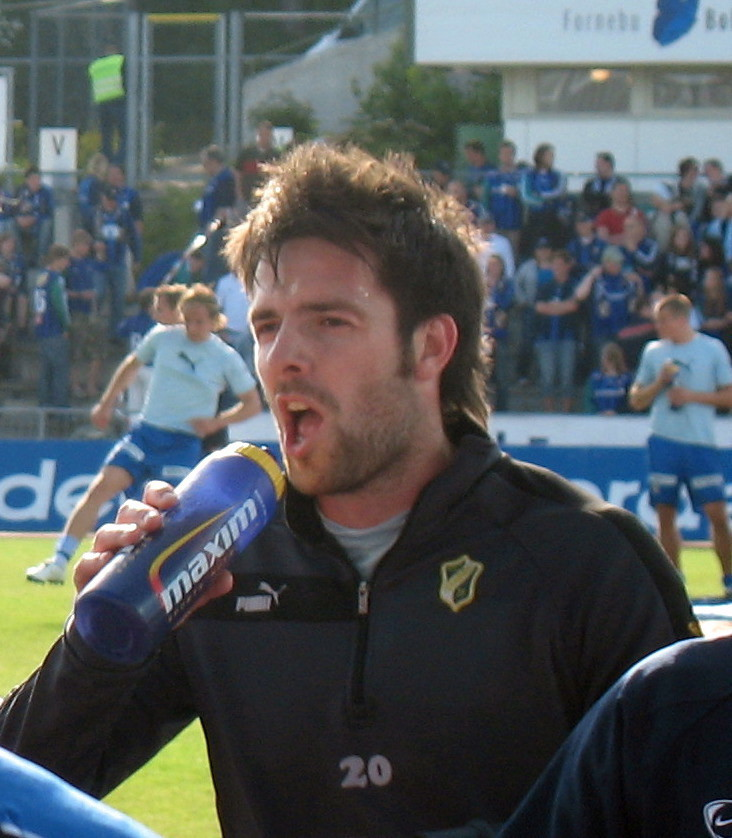

Personal information
- Date of birth: 21 January 1978 (age 48)
- Place of birth: Arendal, Norway
- Height: 1.87 m (6 ft 1 1/2 in)
- Position: Centre back

Youth career
- –1995: Søgne

Senior career*
Years	Team	Apps	(Gls)
1996–1997	Start	10	(1)
1998–2009	Stabæk	143	(13)
2007	→ Start (loan)	8	(0)
2008	→ Strømsgodset (loan)	18	(0)

International career
1995	Norway U17	2	(0)
1996	Norway U18	5	(0)
1996–1997	Norway U20	4	(1)
1997–1999	Norway U21	16	(0)

Managerial career
- 2010–2020: Stabæk (director of sports)
- 2020–2022: AaB (director of sports)
- * Club domestic league appearances and goals

Inge André Olsen (born 21 January 1978) is a retired Norwegian footballer who last played for Stabæk. Olsen came to the club from Start in 1998.

In his second season with Stabæk, the then-Norway U21 international attracted interest from English clubs Leeds United and Wimbledon. A transfer to Wimbledon seemed likely, but it fell through after Olsen was tackled by Heiðar Helguson in a league match and sustained a broken tibia and fibula.

In Stabæk's return season to the Tippeliga in 2006, Olsen was one of the most important player for his team, and was linked to one of the favourites to win the league, Brann from Bergen. The move never materialized. Olsen was loaned out from Stabæk in both 2007 and 2008. In November 2011, Olsen along with Truls Haakonsen were charged as part of a police investigation into the Veigar Páll Gunnarsson transfer 2011, but acquitted in court.

Olsen was the director of sports at Stabæk from 2010. In December 2019 it was announced that the upcoming transfer window was his last as chief of Stabæk's player logistics, and that he would become director of sports at Danish club AaB in April 2020.

== Honours ==
Stabæk

- Norwegian Cup: 1998
- Eliteserien: 2008
