= Niclas Vemmelund =

Danish footballer (born 1992)

Personal information
- Date of birth: 2 October 1992 (age 34)
- Place of birth: Kerteminde, Denmark
- Height: 1.86 m (6 ft 1 in)
- Position: Centre back

Youth career
- FC Fyn U19

Senior career*
Years	Team	Apps	(Gls)
2010–2013	FC Fyn	50	(0)
2013–2014	OB	0	(0)
2014–2015	Stjarnan	18	(2)
2015	BK Marienlyst	0	(0)
2015–2016	IF Brommapojkarna	9	(0)
2016	Derry City	32	(1)
2017	Dundalk	23	(4)
2017–2021	Middelfart Boldklub	87	(4)

International career
	Denmark U19	1	(0)
- * Club domestic league appearances and goals as of 18:38, 7 July 2021 (UTC)

Niclas Vemmelund (born 2 October 1992) is a Danish football defender who currently plays for Middelfart Boldklub in the Danish 2nd Division. He has previously played for FC Fyn, Odense Boldklub, Stjarnan, IF Brommapojkarna, Derry City and Dundalk.

== Club career ==
=== FC Fyn ===
Vemmelund moved from the under 19 youth squad to the full FC Fyn squad in 2010, where he made one cup appearance and 16 league appearances over two years. During the 2011/2012 season he was in the team that won the Danish 2nd Division and subsequent promotion after a playoff with Hellerup IK.

=== Odense Boldklub ===
He moved to Odense Boldklub in March 2013. Although on the bench 14 times over two years, he did not play in the domestic league for Odense. He did however play a Danish Cup match in September 2013, in a 9–1 away win against FC Udfordringen.

=== Ungmennafélagið Stjarnan ===
Due to a lack of appearances for Odense he joined Stjarnan to play in Iceland's premier division, the Úrvalsdeild.

In 2014, Vemmelund made 17 league appearances in the season Stjarnan won the Úrvalsdeild for the first time in their history.

In the 2014–15 UEFA Europa League that year, he was in teams that beat Bangor City in the first qualifying round, Motherwell in the second qualifying round, and Lech Poznań in the third qualifying round. In the play-offs proper he played in both matches in a 9-0 aggregate defeat to Inter Milan.

=== IF Brommapojkarna ===
He returned to Denmark in 2015 but after a few months at BK Marienlyst where he did not feature, in August 2015 he moved on a free transfer to IF Brommapojkarna to play in the Superettan. He played in 9 league matches in a year that Brommapojkarna were relegated to Division 1. He played in one Svenska Cupen match in a 3–0 away win against IF Sylvia.

=== Derry ===
While he was a free agent, Vemmelund underwent a trial with Derry City in December 2015. He was subsequently signed by Derry for the 2016 season in January 2016.

== International career ==
Vemmelund has played in the Danish U19 side.
