= Pontus Nordenberg =

Swedish footballer

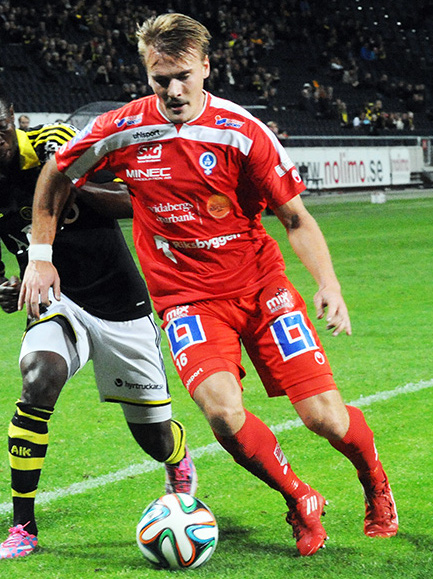

Personal information
- Full name: Pontus Bent Olov; Nordenberg
- Date of birth: 16 February 1995 (age 31)
- Place of birth: Sweden
- Height: 1.83 m (6 ft 0 in)
- Position: Defender

Team information
- Current team: Nyköpings BIS
- Number: 20

Youth career
- Ålberga GIF
- IFK Norrköping

Senior career*
Years	Team	Apps	(Gls)
2011–2012	Nyköpings BIS	32	(3)
2012	→ Nyköpings BIS 2	2	(0)
2013–2015	Åtvidabergs FF	31	(0)
2016	Víkingur Ólafsvík	22	(1)
2017–	Nyköpings BIS	24	(0)

International career^{‡}
2010–2012	Sweden U17	14	(0)
2013–2014	Sweden U19	11	(3)
2015	Sweden U21	1	(0)
- * Club domestic league appearances and goals as of 30 November 2017 ‡ National team caps and goals as of 31 March 2015

Pontus Nordenberg (born 16 February 1995) is a Swedish footballer who plays for Nyköpings BIS as a defender.
