= Fjalar Þorgeirsson =

Icelandic footballer

Personal information
- Date of birth: 18 January 1977 (age 49)
- Place of birth: Iceland
- Height: 1.91 m (6 ft 3 in)
- Position: Goalkeeper

Senior career*
Years	Team	Apps	(Gls)
1997–1999	Þróttur	39	(0)
2000–2001	Fram	26	(0)
2001–2005	Þróttur	66	(0)
2006–2011	Fylkir	109	(0)
2012	KR	2	(0)
2013–2014	Valur	20	(0)
2015	SR	1	(0)

International career^{‡}
1994–1995	Iceland U-19	8	(0)
1999	Iceland U-21	2	(0)
2001–2010	Iceland	5	(0)
- * Club domestic league appearances and goals as of 11 December 2022 ‡ National team caps and goals as of 11 December 2022

Fjalar Þorgeirsson (born 18 January 1977) is an Icelandic football coach and former player who played the goalkeeper position. He played 5 games for the Iceland national football team during his career. He played 227 matches in the Icelandic top-tier Úrvalsdeild karla.

== Playing career ==
Fjalar started his career with Þróttur before joining Fram in 2000. After two seasons with Fram, Fjalar returned to Þróttur where he played until their relegation in 2005.

From 2006 to 2011 he played for Fylkir. On 27 July 2009, he broke his hand during a game against Fram after a collision with an opponent. Despite the injury, he played the remaining 20 minutes of the game.

Prior to the 2012 season, Fjalar signed with KR. During the season, he was a reserve goalkeeper to Hannes Þór Halldórsson, only appeared in two matches. In October 2012, Fjalar signed with Valur. On 15 July 2013, he played his 200th match in the Úrvalsdeild karla.

In May 2015, Fjalar signed with Skautafélag Reykjavíkur where he would appear in one match in the 4. deild karla during the 2015 season.

== Coaching career ==
Fjalar became a goalkeeper coach for Stjarnan in 2015. He later became an assistant manager for the team, a post he served until October 2019. In December the same year, he was hired as a goalkeeper coach for FH.
