= Charley Roussel Fomen =

Cameroonian footballer

Charley Fomen
Personal information
- Full name: Charley Roussel Fomen
- Date of birth: 9 July 1989 (age 37)
- Place of birth: Buea, Cameroon
- Height: 1.72 m (5 ft 7 1/2 in)
- Position: Left-back

Senior career*
Years	Team	Apps	(Gls)
2007–2008	Mount Cameroon	23	(5)
2008–2009	Panthère Bangangté	15	(–)
2009–2011	Marseille	0	(0)
2010–2011	→ Dijon (loan)	28	(0)
2011–2014	Clermont Foot	47	(0)
2015	FH Hafnarfjarðar	0	(0)
2015	→ Leiknir Reykjavík (loan)	17	(1)
2017	Feutcheu FC	32	(3)
2017–2018	Red Star	4	(0)
2018–2020	Panthère Bangangté	35	(4)

International career^{‡}
2009	Cameroon U20	2	(0)
- * Club domestic league appearances and goals as of 10:05, 18 December 2018 (UTC) ‡ National team caps and goals as of 20:06, 8 November 2017 (UTC)

Charley Roussel Fomen (born 9 July 1989) is a Cameroonian footballer who plays as a left-back.

== Club career ==
Fomen began his professional career in 2007 with Mount Cameroon FC, moving in the following year to Panthère de Bangangté.

On 17 April 2009, he had his first abroad experience, signing with French club Olympique de Marseille, who had already scouted the player. During his first season, he did not appear in the league, as the club won the title.

On 1 July 2010, Fomen was loaned to second level's Dijon FCO, in a season-long move. He played 28 times as the club won promotion to Ligue 1.

On 3 August 2011, Fomen moved to Ligue 2 side Clermont Foot on free transfer. After four seasons with Clermont, Fomen was sidelined for a year through injury. He moved to Iceland and signed for Fimleikafélag Hafnarfjarðar. He was loaned by them to another Icelandic club, Leiknir Reykjavík. When his father died in January 2017 he returned to Cameroon, signing a contract with Feutcheu FC.

Fomen signed a two-year contract with French Championnat National side Red Star in July 2017.

== International career ==
Fomen earned his first call-up for the U-17 of Cameroon on 27 July 2006, being summoned for a training camp in his hometown of Buea.
