= Blažo Lalević =

Montenegrin footballer

Personal information
- Full name: Blažo Lalević
- Date of birth: 11 May 1984 (age 42)
- Place of birth: Tivat, SFR Yugoslavia
- Height: 1.78 m (5 ft 10 in)
- Position: Right midfielder

Team information
- Current team: Leiknir

Senior career*
Years	Team	Apps	(Gls)
2002–2004	Crvenka	27	(0)
2004–2007	Hajduk Kula	10	(0)
2004–2006	→ Crvenka (loan)	26	(2)
2006	→ POFK Kula (loan)		
2007	→ Radnički Sombor (loan)	4	(0)
2007–2009	Mladost Apatin	8	(0)
2008	→ Inđija (loan)	11	(0)
2009	→ Crvenka (loan)		
2009	→ Tekstilac Odžaci (loan)	14	(2)
2009–2011	Hajduk Kula	13	(0)
2011	→ Timok (loan)		
2011–2013	Timok	54	(1)
2013–2015	BSK Borča	33	(1)
2016	Huginn	19	(0)
2020-	Leiknir	1	(0)
- * Club domestic league appearances and goals as of 30 April 2015

Blažo Lalević (Cyrillic: Блажо Лалевић; born 11 May 1984) is a Montenegrin football midfielder, who currently plays for Icelandic side Leiknir Fáskrúðsfjörður.
