= Rolf Toft =

Danish footballer (born 1992)

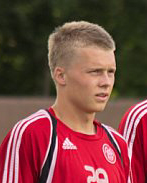

Personal information
- Full name: Rolf Glavind Toft
- Date of birth: 4 August 1992 (age 34)
- Height: 1.81 m (5 ft 11 1/2 in)
- Position: Striker

Team information
- Current team: Brønderslev IF

Youth career
- AaB

Senior career*
Years	Team	Apps	(Gls)
2011–2014	AaB	23	(1)
2014–2015	Stjarnan	11	(6)
2015–2016	Víkingur	22	(4)
2016–2021	Nørresundby FB		
2021–	Brønderslev IF		
- * Club domestic league appearances and goals

Rolf Toft (born 4 August 1992) is a Danish footballer who plays for Danish amateur club Brønderslev IF.

== Career ==
He made his professional debut for AaB in the Superliga when substituted in against OB on 23 October 2011.
