= Martin Rauschenberg =

Danish footballer (born 1992)

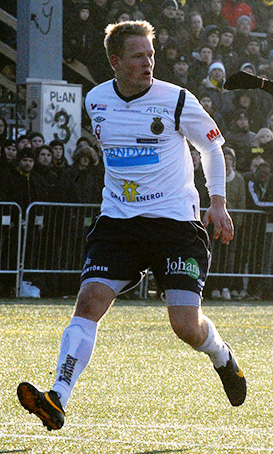

Personal information
- Full name: Martin Rauschenberg Brorsen
- Date of birth: 15 January 1992 (age 34)
- Place of birth: Ribe, Denmark
- Height: 1.85 m (6 ft 1 in)
- Position: Centre back

Team information
- Current team: Gefle IF
- Number: 29

Youth career
- Gredstedbro BK
- Esbjerg fB

Senior career*
Years	Team	Apps	(Gls)
2010–2013	Esbjerg fB	4	(0)
2013–2014	Stjarnan	42	(1)
2015–2017	Gefle IF	86	(2)
2018	Brommapojkarna	17	(1)
2019–2021	Stjarnan	19	(1)
2020–21	→ HK (loan)	28	(2)
2022–	Gefle IF	110	(6)
- * Club domestic league appearances and goals as of 10 November 2025

Martin Rauschenberg Brorsen (born 15 January 1992) is a Danish professional footballer who plays for Superettan club Gefle IF as a defender.
