= Ólafur Karl Finsen =

Icelandic footballer

Personal information
- Full name: Ólafur Karl Finsen
- Date of birth: 30 March 1992 (age 34)
- Place of birth: Iceland
- Height: 1.80 m (5 ft 11 in)
- Positions: Winger; striker

Team information
- Current team: Valur
- Number: 71

Youth career
- –2008: Stjarnan
- 2008–2010: AZ Alkmaar

Senior career*
Years	Team	Apps	(Gls)
2010–2011	Stjarnan	20	(4)
2012	Selfoss	20	(3)
2013–2017	Stjarnan	67	(18)
2015	→ Sandnes Ulf (loan)	5	(0)
2018–2020	Valur	24	(7)
2020	→ FH (loan)	9	(1)
2021–2022	Stjarnan	21	(1)
2023–2024	Fylkir	20	(5)
2024–	Valur	6	(0)

International career
2007–2008	Iceland U17	10	(3)
2008–2010	Iceland U19	15	(2)
2014	Iceland U21	5	(1)
2015	Iceland	2	(0)
- * Club domestic league appearances and goals as of 5 August 2024

Ólafur Karl Finsen (born 30 March 1992) is an Icelandic footballer who currently plays for Valur.

== Club career ==
Ólafur started his career with local club Stjarnan in 2010.

== International career ==
Ólafur made his first international appearance on 16 January 2015 in a match against Canada, when he came on as a substitute for Jón Daði Böðvarsson with about 20 minutes left of the match.
