= Pablo Punyed =

Salvadoran soccer player (born 1990)

Personal information
- Full name: Pablo Oshan Punyed Dubón
- Date of birth: April 18, 1990 (age 36)
- Place of birth: Miami, Florida, United States
- Height: 1.76 m (5 ft 9 in)
- Position: Midfielder

Team information
- Current team: Haukar
- Number: 23

Youth career
- 2005–2007: FUTSOC

College career
| Years | Team | Apps | (Gls) |
| 2008–2011 | St. John's Red Storm | | |

Senior career*
| Years | Team | Apps | (Gls) |
| 2012 | Fjölnir | 22 | (4) |
| 2013 | Fylkir | 11 | (1) |
| 2014–2015 | Stjarnan | 48 | (4) |
| 2016–2017 | ÍBV | 42 | (1) |
| 2018–2020 | KR Reykjavík | 58 | (11) |
| 2020–2025 | Víkingur Reykjavík | 87 | (6) |
| 2026– | Haukar | 20 | (2) |

International career^{‡}
| 2014– | El Salvador | 29 | (3) |
- * Club domestic league appearances and goals as of 2 November 2025 ‡ National team caps and goals as of 19 April 2024

Pablo Oshan Punyed Dubón (born 18 April 1990) is a professional soccer player who plays for Haukar in the 2. deild karla. Born in the United States, he plays for the El Salvador national team.

== Early life ==
Punyed played high school soccer at Coral Park High in Miami where he played center midfield and served as a captain as a junior and senior. He later played college soccer at St. John's University.

== Club career ==
After graduating in 2012, Punyed started his professional career with Fjölnir in the Icelandic Úrvalsdeild karla. He spent the following season with Fylkir before signing with Stjarnan where he won the Icelandic championship in 2014. After two seasons with Stjarnan, he signed with ÍBV where he played two season. In 2018, he signed with Knattspyrnufélag Reykjavíkur. In 2019, he won the Icelandic championship with KR. In November 2020 Pablo signed for Víkingur Reykjavík.

== International career ==
He made his international debut for the El Salvador national football team on October 10, 2014, against Colombia, where El Salvador was shut out 3–0. He then played three more games for El Salvador and received his first yellow card with the national side in the game against Nicaragua.

=== International goals ===
Scores and results El Salvador's goal tally first.

| No. | Date | Venue | Opponent | Score | Result | Competition |
|---|---|---|---|---|---|---|
| 1. | 9 October 2015 | BBVA Compass Stadium, Houston, United States | Haiti | 1–3 | 1–3 | Friendly |
| 2. | 25 March 2016 | Estadio Cuscatlán, San Salvador, El Salvador | Honduras | 1–1 | 2–2 | 2018 FIFA World Cup qualification |
| 3. | 19 November 2019 | Estadio Cuscatlán, San Salvador, El Salvador | Dominican Republic | 2–0 | 2–0 | 2019–20 CONCACAF Nations League B |

== Honours ==
=== Club ===
Stjarnan

- Úrvalsdeild (1): 2014
- Icelandic Super Cup (1): 2015

ÍBV

- Icelandic Cup (1): 2017

KR

- Úrvalsdeild (1): 2019

Víkingur

- Úrvalsdeild (3): 2021 2023, 2025
- Icelandic Cup (3): 2021, 2022 2023

== Personal life ==
Punyed's younger brother Renato Punyed has capped for the Nicaragua national football team.
