= Arnar Darri Pétursson =

Icelandic footballer

Arnar Pétursson
Personal information
- Full name: Arnar Darri Pétursson
- Date of birth: 16 March 1991 (age 35)
- Place of birth: Reykjavík, Iceland
- Height: 1.92 m (6 ft 4 in)
- Position: Goalkeeper

Team information
- Current team: Stjarnan
- Number: 13

Youth career
- Stjarnan
- 2008: Lyn

Senior career*
| Years | Team | Apps | (Gls) |
| 2008–2010 | Lyn | 15 | (0) |
| 2010–2012 | SønderjyskE | 0 | (0) |
| 2012–2015 | Stjarnan | 3 | (0) |
| 2014 | → Víkingur Ólafsvík (loan) | 22 | (0) |
| 2016–2020 | Þróttur | 76 | (0) |
| 2020 | Fylkir | 1 | (0) |
| 2021– | Stjarnan | 3 | (0) |

International career
| 2007 | Iceland U-17 | 7 | (0) |
| 2008–2009 | Iceland U-19 | 4 | (0) |
| 2010–2011 | Iceland U-21 | 7 | (0) |
- * Club domestic league appearances and goals as of 09:40, 3 October 2021 (UTC)

Arnar Darri Pétursson (born 16 March 1991) is an Icelandic professional footballer who plays as a goalkeeper for Stjarnan.

He started his career with Stjarnan, and joined Oslo-based club Lyn in March 2008. When Lyn had financial problems in summer 2010 he was signed by SønderjyskE of the Danish Superliga. He made his international U21 debut against Scotland in the fall of 2010 when Iceland met Scotland in playoffs to reach the EM U21 Finals in Denmark 2011. Iceland won both games 2–1 and qualified.

== Club career ==
=== Stjarnan ===
Arnar played a first team game for Stjarnanbut played with all their youth teams.

=== Lyn ===
At the time Arnar moved to Lyn they had among others Indridi Sigurdsson, Theodor Elmar Bjarnason and more quality players. He made his Norwegian Premier League debut for Lyn on 3 August 2009 against SK Brann. In the end Lyn had to sell all their best players and was in the summer of 2010 declared bankrupt. It was demoted to the Norwegian lower leagues as an amateur club. With Lyn Arnar played 15 games, five of them in the Tippeligaen.

=== SønderjyskE ===
On 1 July 2010, Arnar signed for Danish Superliga club SønderjyskE, which is located near the German border, to compete with their existing number one goalkeeper Nathan Coe. He signed for two years.
