= Jeppe Hansen =

Danish footballer (born 1989)

Personal information
- Full name: Jeppe Hansen
- Date of birth: 10 February 1989 (age 37)
- Place of birth: Fredericia, Denmark
- Height: 1.85 m (6 ft 1 in)
- Position: Forward

Youth career
- –2008: Fredericia

Senior career*
Years	Team	Apps	(Gls)
2008–2011	Fredericia	2	(0)
2011–2012	Otterup		
2012–2013	Næsby		
2013–2014	OB	8	(1)
2014	Stjarnan	9	(6)
2014–2015	Fredericia	5	(0)
2015–2016	Stjarnan	28	(10)
2016	KR	10	(1)
2016–2018	Keflavík	31	(15)
2018	→ ÍA (loan)	9	(6)
2019–2021	Kolding	44	(10)
2021–2023	Aarhus Fremad	44	(7)
- * Club domestic league appearances and goals

Jeppe Hansen (born 10 February 1989) is a Danish retired professional footballer who plays as a forward.

Hansen, who began his career with his hometown club FC Fredericia, has also played for Otterup B&IK, Næsby BK and OB, as well as Icelandic sides Stjarnan, KR and Keflavík

== Career ==
Hansen began his career as a youth player with his local side FC Fredericia, before making small number of appearances for the first team. After spells with lower league clubs Otterup B&IK and Otterup B&IK, he signed a one-year deal with Danish Superliga club OB, where he scored 1 goal in 8 matches. After his contract ended in May 2014, Hansen moved to Iceland, signing for Úrvalsdeild club Stjarnan. However, Hansen remained in Iceland for just two months, before returning to his hometown team FC Fredericia where he signed a two-year deal. During this time, however, Hansen expressed his desire to return to Iceland, and in January 2015, he once again signed for Stjarnan.

After a successful season with Stjarnan, in which he scored 12 goals in 32 matches, Hansen was signed by Icelandic giants KR in July 2016. At the end of the 2016 Icelandic season, Hansen agreed a two-year deal with 1. deild side Keflavík.

In January 2019, Hansen joined Danish third tier club Kolding IF. He reached promotion to the second division in his first season with the club. After 1,5-years at the club, Hansen left and signed for Aarhus Fremad on 5 June 2021.
