= Veigar Páll Gunnarsson =

Icelandic footballer (born 1980)

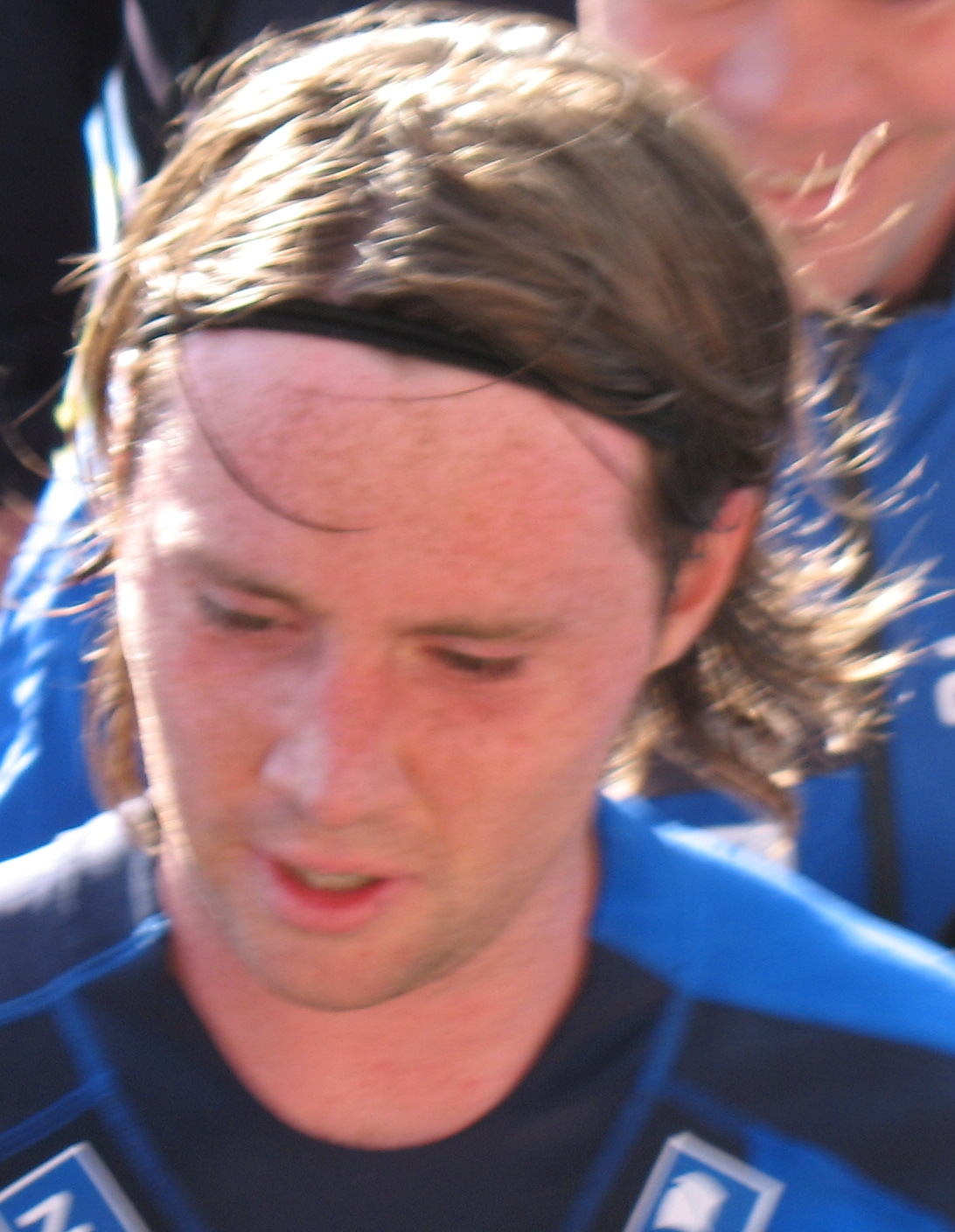

Personal information
- Date of birth: 21 March 1980 (age 46)
- Place of birth: Reykjavík, Iceland
- Height: 5 ft 9 in (1.75 m)
- Position: Forward

Senior career*
Years	Team	Apps	(Gls)
1996–2000	Stjarnan	58	(14)
2001	Strømsgodset	15	(2)
2002–2003	KR Reykjavík	30	(14)
2004–2008	Stabæk	120	(60)
2009	Nancy	5	(0)
2009–2011	Stabæk	40	(19)
2011–2012	Vålerenga	20	(3)
2012	Stabæk	10	(2)
2013–2016	Stjarnan	70	(16)
2017	FH Hafnarfjörður	1	(0)
2017	→ Víkingur Reykjavík (loan)	7	(0)
2018–2019	KFG Garðabær	19	(8)

International career
1998	Iceland U-19	7	(3)
2000–2001	Iceland U-21	11	(3)
2001–2011	Iceland	34	(6)
- * Club domestic league appearances and goals

Veigar Páll Gunnarsson (born 21 March 1980) is an Icelandic former professional footballer who played as a forward.

His transfer in 2011 led to football clubs Stabæk and Vålerenga being nominated for fines of Norwegian kroner 500,000 and 350,000 respectively, by a committee (påtalenemd) of Football Association of Norway — and a police investigation that saw two persons arrested.

== Club career ==
=== Early years ===
Veigar Páll made his debut for Stjarnan in the 1996 season, in which he only managed one=1 game as a substitute. He established himself as a regular in the side and started scoring goals, catching the eye of foreign teams. He then went abroad to Norway, where he played for Strømsgodset. He failed to establish himself in the first team so he returned to Iceland to play for KR Reykjavík. He quickly became popular with the fans and was the star player of the KR team that won the Icelandic Premier League in 2002 and 2003. In September 2003, he had a trial with Bolton Wanderers of the English Premier League.

=== Stabæk ===
Veigar joined Stabæk in 2004 in the season they got relegated, after being placed third in the league the previous year. He flourished under new coach Jan Jönsson in 2005, alongside new signing Daniel Nannskog. Veigar was leading the attack with Nannskog, a partnership which was the most feared duo in the league, according to statistics (goals and assist). In the 2006 season, Nannskog became top scorer with 19 goals in Tippeligaen, the Norwegian top division, with Veigar finishing one goal behind.

In 2007, Stabæk finished second, just behind winners Brann. Veigar played well, and was the seasons assist leader with 17, and fourth on the scoring chart with 15.

The following season he made another big contribution to the club, helping them winning the league. Again, he was the season's assist leader with 14, in addition to ten goals.

=== Nancy ===
In December 2008, he signed a contract with the French club Nancy of Ligue 1.

=== Return to Stabæk ===
On 30 November 2009, Stabæk confirmed that Veigar had signed a contract with his former club. Veigar himself stated that he felt that Nancy had destroyed his career by not letting him play, but that he was looking forward to returning "home" to Stabæk.

=== Vålerenga ===
On 30 July 2011, Stabæk and Vålerenga reached an agreement, which later led to controversies. Veigar signed a contract with Vålerenga until the end of 2014.

After another spell at Stabæk, Veigar returned to his youth-club Stjarnan in 2013, and signed a four-year contract with the club.

== International career ==
Veigar made his debut for Iceland in a January 2001 friendly match against Uruguay at the Millennium Super Soccer Cup in India. He has been capped 33 times since and has scored six goals.

== Career statistics ==
As of 14 September 2019

Appearances and goals by club, season and competition
Season	Club	League			Cup		Continental		Other		Total	
Season	Club	Division	Apps	Goals	Apps	Goals	Apps	Goals	Apps	Goals	Apps	Goals
Stjarnan	1996	Úrvalsdeild	1	0	2	0	–		–		3	0
Stjarnan	1997	Úrvalsdeild	10	0	2	0	–		–		12	0
Stjarnan	1998	1. deild karla	14	4	2	0	–		–		16	4
Stjarnan	1999	1. deild karla	17	7	4	4	–		–		21	11
Stjarnan	2000	Úrvalsdeild	16	3	2	1	–		–		18	4
Stjarnan	Total		58	14	12	5	0	0	0	0	70	19
Strømsgodset	2001	Tippeligaen	15	2	2	1	0	0	–		17	3
KR Reykjavík	2002	Úrvalsdeild	17	7	2	0	–		3	1	22	8
KR Reykjavík	2003	Úrvalsdeild	13	7	3	2	2	0	8	3	26	12
KR Reykjavík	2004	Úrvalsdeild	–		–		–		2	3	2	3
KR Reykjavík	Total		30	14	5	2	2	0	13	7	50	23
Stabæk	2004	Tippeligaen	16	2	4	2	2	1	–		22	5
Stabæk	2005	1. divisjon	28	13	5	4	0	0	–		33	17
Stabæk	2006	Tippeligaen	25	18	3	2	0	0	–		28	20
Stabæk	2007	Tippeligaen	25	15	5	4	0	0	–		30	19
Stabæk	2008	Tippeligaen	26	12	7	7	2	0	–		35	19
Stabæk	Total		120	60	24	19	4	1	0	0	148	80
Nancy	2008–09	Ligue 1	5	0	0	0	0	0	1	0	6	0
Stabæk	2010	Tippeligaen	24	10	2	2	0	0	–		26	12
Stabæk	2011	Tippeligaen	16	9	3	0	0	0	–		19	9
Stabæk	Total		40	19	5	2	0	0	0	0	45	21
Vålerenga	2011	Tippeligaen	13	3	0	0	0	0	–		13	3
Vålerenga	2012	Tippeligaen	7	0	3	0	0	0	–		10	0
Vålerenga	Total		20	3	3	0	0	0	0	0	23	3
Stabæk	2012	Tippeligaen	10	2	0	0	0	0	–		10	2
Stjarnan	2013	Úrvalsdeild	19	4	4	2	–		7	1	30	7
Stjarnan	2014	Úrvalsdeild	17	6	2	0	6	1	7	6	32	13
Stjarnan	2015	Úrvalsdeild	17	1	2	0	2	0	6	0	27	1
Stjarnan	2016	Úrvalsdeild	17	5	2	0	–		5	3	24	8
Stjarnan	Total		70	16	10	2	8	1	25	10	113	29
FH	2017	Úrvalsdeild	1	0	1	0	0	0	–		2	0
Víkingur Reykjavík (loan)	2017	Úrvalsdeild	7	0	–		–		–		7	0
KFG Garðabær	2018	3. deild karla	13	8	1	0	–		3	1	17	9
KFG Garðabær	2019	2. deild karla	6	0	0	0	–		1	0	7	0
KFG Garðabær	Total		19	8	1	0	0	0	4	1	24	9
Career total			395	138	63	31	14	1	43	18	515	188

== Honours ==
KR

- Landsbankadeild: 2002, 2003

Stabæk

- Tippeligaen: 2008
- 1. divisjon: 2005

Stjarnan

- Pepsi-deild karla: 2014

== See also ==
Veigar Páll Gunnarsson transfer 2011
