= Rúnar Páll Sigmundsson =

Icelandic footballer (born 1974)

Personal information
- Date of birth: 5 May 1974 (age 52)
- Place of birth: Iceland
- Height: 1.78 m (5 ft 10 in)
- Position: Midfielder

Senior career*
Years	Team	Apps	(Gls)
1991–1992	Stjarnan	24	(2)
1993	Fram	9	(1)
1994	Sogndal	0	(0)
1995–2003	Stjarnan	108	(18)
2007	HK	13	(1)

International career
1989	Iceland U16	5	(0)
1989	Iceland U17	1	(0)
1990–1992	Iceland U19	10	(2)

Managerial career
- 2008–2009: HK
- 2010–2012: Levanger
- 2014–2021: Stjarnan
- 2021–2024: Fylkir
- 2024–: Grótta
- * Club domestic league appearances and goals

Rúnar Páll Sigmundsson (born 5 May 1974) is an Icelandic football manager and former footballer who manages Grótta.

== Career ==
Sigmundsson was born on 5 May 1974 in Iceland. He joined the youth academy of Icelandic side Stjarnan at the age of eight. He started his senior career with the club. In 1993, he signed for Fram. He was an Iceland youth international. He played for the Iceland national under-16 football team, Iceland national under-17 football team, and Iceland national under-19 football team.

In September 1993 he was training with Norwegian side Sogndal. When he got the chance against Bærum in the 1994 cup, he left the field injured after about 30 minutes. He returned to Iceland after the 1995 season. According to Sogn Avis, he was "no success". In 1995, he returned to Icelandic side Stjarnan.

Sigmundsson started his managerial career with Icelandic side HK. He is regarded to prefer the 4-2-3-1 formation. In 2010, he was appointed manager of Norwegian side Levanger. He was tasked with helping the club achieve promotion. In 2014, he was appointed manager of Icelandic side Stjarnan. He helped the club win the league for the first time. They went that season unbeaten in the league. He helped them win the 2018 Icelandic Cup, the first time they won the Icelandic Cup. In 2021, he was appointed manager of Icelandic side Fylkir.
