= Hörður Árnason =

Icelandic footballer

Personal information
- Full name: Hörður Árnason
- Date of birth: 19 May 1989 (age 37)
- Place of birth: Iceland
- Position: Left back

Team information
- Current team: HK
- Number: 14

Youth career
- HK

Senior career*
Years	Team	Apps	(Gls)
2007–2010	HK	64	(1)
2007	→ Ýmir (loan)	8	(2)
2011–2018	Stjarnan	128	(1)
2018–	HK	36	(1)

International career
2015	Iceland	1	(0)
- * Club domestic league appearances and goals as of 17 July 2020

Hörður Árnason (born 19 May 1989) is an Icelandic football left back playing for HK.

== Club career ==
Hörður started his career with local club HK in 2008, having spent the 2007 season on loan to affiliate club Ýmir. He moved to Stjarnan in the Úrvalsdeild before the 2011 season.

In September 2019, at the end of the Icelandic 2019 season, 30-year old Hörður announced his retirement from football. In May 2020, before the Icelandic 2020 season, he decided to start playing again.

== International career ==
Hörður made his first international appearance on 19 January 2015 in a match against Canada, playing the entire match.
