= Söngkeppni framhaldsskólanna =

Icelandic school singing competition

The Singing Contest of Icelandic Junior Colleges (Söngkeppni framhaldsskólanna) is a yearly competition that has been held since 1990 on behalf of "The Icelandic Upper Secondary School Student Union". Each year, a preliminary competition is held in each college and then representatives from each school compete on the final evening of the main competition. The singing contest is usually held before the end of the school year.

No one school has monopolized the competition, which is not the case in some of the other college competitions.

== The list of Winners starting from the first competition ==
- 1990 – Fjölbrautaskóli Suðurlands
  - Performer: Lárus Ingi Magnússon
  - Song: Eltu mig uppi (Sálin hans Jóns míns)
  - 2nd place: Móeiður Júníusdóttir, MR
  - 3rd place: Páll Óskar Hjálmtýsson, MH
- 1991 – Flensborgarskólinn í Hafnarfirði
  - Performer: Margrét Eir Hjartardóttir
  - Song: Glugginn
  - 2nd place: Hera Björk Þórhallsdóttir, FB
  - 3rd place: Ottó Tynes, MS
- 1992 – Menntaskólinn í Reykjavík
  - Performer: Margrét Sigurðardóttir
  - Song: Látúnsbarkinn (Stuðmenn)
- 1993 – Menntaskólinn í Reykjavík
  - Performer: Þóranna Jónbjörnsdóttir
  - Song: Dimmar rósir
- 1994 – Menntaskólinn í Kópavogi
  - Performer: Emilíana Torrini
  - Song: I Will Survive
  - 2nd place: Flensborgardætur Berglind Helga Sigurþórsdóttir, Katrín Ósk Einarsdóttir, Sigrún Pálmadóttir
  - 3rd place:
- 1995 – Fjölbrautaskóli Norðurlands vestra
  - Performer: Hrafnhildur Ýr Víglundsdóttir
  - Song: Wind Beneath My Wings
  - 2nd place: Sara Guðmundsdóttir, Flensborg
  - 3rd place: Svavar Knútur Kristinsson, MH
- 1996 – Menntaskólinn í Kópavogi
  - Performer: Þórey Heiðdal Vilhjálmsdóttir
  - Song: Hetja/ Hero (Mariah Carey)
  - 2nd place: Regína Ósk, MH
  - 3rd place:Jón Jósep Snæbjörnsson, MA
- 1997 – Menntaskólinn við Hamrahlíð (Hamrahlid College)
  - Performer: Haukur Halldórsson and Flóki Guðmundsson (Limó duet)
  - Lag: Harmleikur/Tragedy (Bee Gees)
  - 2nd place: MK
  - 3rd place: Harpa Heiðarssdóttir MA
- 1998 – Menntaskólinn við Hamrahlíð (Hamrahlid College)
  - Performers: Aðalsteinn Bergdal, Davíð Olgeirsson, Kristbjörn Helgason, Orri Páll Jóhannsson and Viktor Már Bjarnason (Brooklyn fæv)
  - Song: Óralanga leið/For the Longest Time (Billy Joel)
  - 2nd place:
  - 3rd place:
- 1999 – Flensborgarskólinn í Hafnarfirði
  - Performer: Guðrún Árný Karlsdóttir
  - Song: To Love You More (Celine Dion)
  - 2nd place: Þorvaldur Þorvaldsson, Menntaskólinn við Sund
  - 3rd place: Arnbjörg Ösp Matthíasdóttir, Lára Bryndís Eggertsdóttir, Lovísa Árnadóttir and Sigríður Rafnar Pétursdóttir (Djúsí-systur), Menntaskólinn í Reykjavík
- 2000 – Fjölbrautaskóli Norðurlands vestra
  - Performer: Sverrir Bergmann
  - Song: Always (Bon Jovi)
  - 2nd place: Jóhannes Haukur Jóhannesson, Flensborg
  - 3rd place: Helgi Valur Ásgeirsson, Fjölbrautarskóla Suðurlands
- 2001 – Flensborgarskólinn í Hafnarfirði
  - Performer: Arnar Þór Viðarsson
  - Song: Þakklæti/To be Grateful (Trúbrot)
  - 2nd place:
  - 3rd place:
- 2002 – Fjölbrautaskóli Norðurlands vestra
  - Performer: Eva Karlotta Einarsdóttir & the Sheep River Hooks
  - Song: (Original Song – title needed)
  - 2nd place: Eva Dögg Sveinsdóttir Kvennaskólinn í Reykjavík
  - 3rd place: Herdís Anna Jónasdóttir & Þórunn Arna Kristjánsdóttir, Menntaskólinn á Ísafirði
  - Song: Hvítu Mávar
- 2003 – Menntaskólinn á Akureyri (Akureyri Junior College)
  - Performer: Anna Katrín Guðbrandsdóttir
  - Song: Vísur Vatnsenda-Rósu
  - Arrangement: Ólafur Haukur Árnason and Styrmir Hauksson
  - 2nd place: Sigþór Árnason, Fjölbrautaskóli Suðurlands
  - 3rd place: Elísabet Eyþórsdóttir, Borgarholtsskóli
  - Venue: Íþróttahöllin á Akureyri
- 2004 – Menntaskólinn við Hamrahlíð
  - Performers: Sunna Ingólfsdóttir and Sigurlaug Gísladóttir
  - Song: Green Eyes (Erykah Badu)
  - 2nd place: Heimir Bjarni Ingimarsson, Verkmenntaskólinn á Akureyri
  - 3rd place: Birgir Olgeirsson, Menntaskólinn á Ísafirði
- 2005 – Menntaskólinn í Reykjavík
  - Performer: Hrund Ósk Árnadóttir
  - Song: Sagan af Gunnu
  - 2nd place: Dagný Elísa Halldórsdóttir, Verkmenntaskólinn á Akureyri
  - 3rd place: Elísabet Ásta Bjarkadóttir, Fjölbrautaskóli Suðurlands
- 2006 – Fjölbrautaskóli Vesturlands
  - Performer: Helga Ingibjörg Guðjónsdóttir
  - Song: Ruby Tuesday (Rolling Stones)
  - 2nd place: Menntaskólinn í Kópavogi
  - 3rd place:
  - Sms kosning: Hann og Hún – Brynjar Páll Rögnvaldsson – Helgi Sæmundur Guðmundsson – Hrund Jóhannsdóttir – Ragnheiður Silja Have Jónsdóttir
- 2007 – Verkmenntaskólinn á Akureyri
  - Performer: Eyþór Ingi Gunnlaugsson
  - Song: Framtíð bíður
- 2008 – Verzlunarskóli Íslands (Commercial College of Iceland)
  - Performer: Sigurður Þór Óskarsson
  - Song: The Professor (Damien Rice)
  - 2nd place: Ingunn Kristjánsdóttir, Fjölbrautaskóla Norðurlands vestra
  - 3rd place: Dagur Sigurðsson, Fjölbrautaskólanum við Ármúla
- 2009 – Fjölbrautarskóli Vesturlands
  - Performer: Kristín Þóra Jóhannsdóttir
  - Song: Einmanna sál (Angels – Robbie Williams)
- 2010 – Borgarholtsskóli
  - Performers: Kristmundur Axel and Júlí Heiðar
  - Song: Komdu til baka – (Tears in Heaven) along with an original rap
  - 2nd place: Darri Rafn Hólmarsson and Rakel Sigurðardóttir, Menntaskólinn á Akureyri;
  - 3rd place: Hallfríður Þóra Tryggvadóttir, Verzlunarskóli Íslands
- 2011 - Tækniskólinn
  - Performers: Dagur Sigurðsson
  - Song: Vitskert vera/Helter Skelter (The Beatles)
  - 2nd place: Rakarasvið, Menntaskólinn við Sund
  - 3rd place: Sabína Siv, Fjölbrautaskóli Suðurnesja
- 2012 - Tækniskólinn
  - Performers: Karlakór Sjómannaskólans
  - Song: Stolt siglir fleyið mitt (Gylfa Ægisson)
  - 2nd place: Jóhann Freyr Óðinsson, Verkmenntaskólinn á Akureyri
  - 3rd place: Rut Ragnarsdóttir og Ragnar Þór Jónsson, Framhaldsskólinn á Húsavík
- 2013 - Menntaskólinn við Hamrahlíð
  - Performers: Ásdís María Ingvarsdóttir og Oddur Ingi Kristjánsson
  - Song: Pink Matter (Frank Ocean)
  - 2nd place: Þóra María Rögnvaldsdóttir, Fjölbrautarskólinn í Breiðholti
  - 3rd place: Menntaskólinn á Laugarvatni
- 2014 - Tækniskólinn
  - Performers: Sara Pétursdóttir
  - Song: Make You Feel My Love (Bob Dylan)
  - 2nd place: Menntaskólinn í Kópavogi
  - 3rd place: Verslunarskóli Íslands
- 2015 - Menntaskólinn í Reykjavík
  - Performers: Karólína Jóhannsdóttir
  - Song: Go Slow (HAIM)
  - 2nd place: Aron Hannes Emilsson, Borgarholtsskóla
  - 3rd place: Saga Matthildur Árnadóttir, Fjölbrautaskólinn í Garðabæ
- 2016 - Menntaskólinn við Hamrahlíð
  - Performers: Náttsól (Elín Sif Halldórsdóttir, Guðrún Ólafsdóttir og Hranfhildur Magnea Ingólfsdóttir)
  - Song: Go Slow (HAIM)
  - 2nd place: Jóna Alla Axelsdóttir og Ari Jónsson, Fjölbrautaskóli Vesturlands á Akranesi
  - 3rd place: Guðbjörg Viðja Antonsdóttir, Aron Ýmir Antonsson, Elva Rún Pétursdóttir, Guðjón Andri Jóhannsson og Sigrún Birna Pétursdóttir, Menntaskólinn á Laugarvatni
- 2018 - Menntaskólinn á Akureyri
  - Performers: Birkir Blær Óðinsson
  - Song: I Put a Spell on You (Screamin’ Jay Hawkins)
  - Vinsælasta atriðið: Valdís Valbjörndóttir, Fjölbrautaskóli Norðurlands Vestra
- 2019 - Tækniskólinn
  - Performers: Aaron Ísak Berry
  - Song: Love of My Life (Queen)
  - 2nd place: Anna Róshildur Benediktsdóttir, Menntaskólinn við Hamrahlíð
  - 3rd place: Diljá Pétursdóttir, Verslunarskóli Íslands
  - Karlotta Ósk Sigurðardóttir won for the most beautiful singing in 2019.
- 2020 - Menntaskólinn á Tröllaskaga
  - Performers: Tryggvi Þorvaldsson, Hörður Ingi Kristjánsson, Júlíus Þorvaldsson og Mikael Sigurðsson
  - Song: I'm Gonna Find Another You (John Mayer)
  - 2nd place: Dagmar Lilja Óskarsdóttir, Framhaldsskólinn í Austur- Skaftafellssýslu
  - 3rd place: Sigríður Halla Eiríksdóttir, Menntaskólinn í Reykjavík
- 2021 - Menntaskólinn í Reykjavík
  - Performers: Jóhanna Björk Snorradóttir
  - Song: Distance (Yebba)
  - 2nd place: Þorsteinn Helgi Kristjánsson, Fjölbrautaskóli Suðurnesja
  - 3rd place: Rakel Björgvinsdóttir, Menntaskólinn í Tónlist
