= Gettu betur =

1986 Icelandic TV quiz show

- Title for Season 26 (2011)
- Genre: Game show
- Created by: Jon Gustafsson, Steinar J. Lúðvíksson
- Developed by: Andrés Indriðason
- Directed by: Helgi Jóhannesson
- Presented by: Jon Gustafsson & Þorgeir Ástvaldsson (1986); Hermann Gunnarsson (1987); Vernharður Linnet (1988-1989); Steinunn Sigurðardóttir (1990); Stefán Jón Hafstein (1991-1994); Ómar Ragnarsson (1995); Davíð Þór Jónsson (1996-1998); Logi Bergmann Eiðsson (1999-2005); Sigmar Guðmundsson (2006-2008); Eva María Jónsdóttir (2009-2010); Edda Hermannsdóttir (2011-2013); Björn Bragi Arnarsson (2014-2018); Kristjana Arnarsdóttir (2019-2023); Kristinn Óli S. Haraldsson (2024-)
- Theme music composer: Magnús Kjartansson
- Country of origin: Iceland

Production
- Executive producer: Andrés Indriðason (1991 - present)
- Production locations: RÚV Studios, Reykjavík, Iceland (current)
- Camera setup: Multi-camera
- Running time: Approx. 60 minutes
- Production company: RÚV

Original release
- Network: RÚV
- Release: 1986 – present

Gettu betur (English: Make a Better Guess) is an Icelandic team quiz show, broadcast on public television channel RÚV. Each team consists of three students from one of Iceland's high schools or colleges. Two teams play against each other in each episode. Two preliminary rounds are broadcast on radio station Rás 2, followed by televised quarter-final, semi-final and final rounds on RÚV. Thirty schools participated in the 2011 season. The current host is Kristinn Óli S. Haraldsson.

Gettu betur was first held in 1986. Menntaskólinn í Reykjavík has won the contest 20 times overall, first in 1988, and then eleven times in a row, from 1993 to 2003, from 2007 to 2010 and in 2012, 2013, 2015, and 2016. The only other schools to win more than once are Menntaskólinn á Akureyri, with three wins and Kvennaskólinn í Reykjavík with two.

== Seasons ==
Season	Year	Host	Judge	Scorekeeper	Winner	Runner-up
1	1986	Jon Gustafsson & Þorgeir Ástvaldsson	Steinar J. Lúðvíksson	Halldór Friðrik Þorsteinsson & Jón Gunnar Jónsson	Fjölbrautaskóli Suðurlands	Flensborgarskólinn í Hafnarfirði
2	1987	Vernharður Linnet (preliminary rounds), Hermann Gunnarsson and Elísabet Sveinsdóttir	Steinar J. Lúðvíksson and Sæmundur Guðvinsson		Fjölbrautaskólinn í Breiðholti	Menntaskólinn við Sund
3	1988	Vernharður Linnet	Páll Lýðsson		Menntaskólinn í Reykjavík	
4	1989	Vernharður Linnet	Páll Lýðsson		Menntaskólinn í Kópavogi	
5	1990	Steinunn Sigurðardóttir	Sonja B. Jónsdóttir and Magdalena Schram (alternately)		Menntaskólinn við Sund	Verzlunarskóli Íslands
6	1991	Stefán Jón Hafstein	Ragnheiður Erla Bjarnadóttir	Oddný Eir Ævarsdóttir	Menntaskólinn á Akureyri	Flensborgarskólinn í Hafnarfirði
7	1992	Sigurður Þór Salvarsson (preliminary rounds), Stefán Jón Hafstein	Ragnheiður Erla Bjarnadóttir	Oddný Eir Ævarsdóttir	Menntaskólinn á Akureyri	Verkmenntaskólinn á Akureyri
8	1993	Ómar Valdimarsson (preliminary rounds), Stefán Jón Hafstein	Álfheiður Ingadóttir	Sólveig Samúelsdóttir	Menntaskólinn í Reykjavík	
9	1994	Stefán Jón Hafstein	Ólafur B. Guðnason	Sólveig Samúelsdóttir	Menntaskólinn í Reykjavík	
10	1995	Ómar Ragnarsson	Ólafur B. Guðnason	Sólveig Samúelsdóttir	Menntaskólinn í Reykjavík	
11	1996	Davíð Þór Jónsson	Helgi Ólafsson		Menntaskólinn í Reykjavík	Flensborgarskólinn í Hafnarfirði
12	1997	Davíð Þór Jónsson	Ragnheiður Erla Bjarnadóttir		Menntaskólinn í Reykjavík	Menntaskólinn við Hamrahlíð
13	1998	Davíð Þór Jónsson	Gunnsteinn Ólafsson	Katrín Jakobsdóttir	Menntaskólinn í Reykjavík	Menntaskólinn við Hamrahlíð
14	1999	Logi Bergmann Eiðsson	Illugi Jökulsson	Þóra Arnórsdóttir	Menntaskólinn í Reykjavík	
15	2000	Logi Bergmann Eiðsson	Ólína Þorvarðardóttir	Þóra Arnórsdóttir	Menntaskólinn í Reykjavík	Menntaskólinn við Hamrahlíð
16	2001	Logi Bergmann Eiðsson	Ármann Jakobsson	Þóra Arnórsdóttir	Menntaskólinn í Reykjavík	Borgarholtsskóli
17	2002	Logi Bergmann Eiðsson	Eggert Þór Bernharðsson	Þóra Arnórsdóttir	Menntaskólinn í Reykjavík	Menntaskólinn við Sund
18	2003	Logi Bergmann Eiðsson	Sveinn H. Guðmarsson	Svanhildur Hólm Valsdóttir	Menntaskólinn í Reykjavík	Menntaskólinn við Sund
19	2004	Logi Bergmann Eiðsson	Stefán Pálsson	Steinunn Vala Sigfúsdóttir	Verzlunarskóli Íslands	Borgarholtsskóli
20	2005	Logi Bergmann Eiðsson	Stefán Pálsson	Steinunn Vala Sigfúsdóttir	Borgarholtsskóli	Menntaskólinn á Akureyri
21	2006	Sigmar Guðmundsson	Anna Kristín Jónsdóttir	Steinunn Vala Sigfúsdóttir	Menntaskólinn á Akureyri	Verzlunarskóli Íslands
22	2007	Sigmar Guðmundsson	Davíð Þór Jónsson	Steinunn Vala Sigfúsdóttir	Menntaskólinn í Reykjavík	Menntaskólinn í Kópavogi
23	2008	Sigmar Guðmundsson	Páll Ásgeir Ásgeirsson	Steinunn Vala Sigfúsdóttir	Menntaskólinn í Reykjavík	Menntaskólinn á Akureyri
24	2009	Eva María Jónsdóttir	Davíð Þór Jónsson	Ásgeir Erlendsson	Menntaskólinn í Reykjavík	Menntaskólinn við Hamrahlíð
25	2010	Eva María Jónsdóttir	Örn Úlfar Sævarsson	Ásgeir Erlendsson	Menntaskólinn í Reykjavík	Verzlunarskóli Íslands
26	2011	Edda Hermannsdóttir	Örn Úlfar Sævarsson	Marteinn Sindri Jónsson	Kvennaskólinn í Reykjavík	Menntaskólinn í Reykjavík
27	2012	Edda Hermannsdóttir	Örn Úlfar Sævarsson and Þórhildur Ólafsdóttir		Menntaskólinn í Reykjavík	Kvennaskólinn í Reykjavík
28	2013	Edda Hermannsdóttir	Atli Freyr Steinþórsson and Þórhildur Ólafsdóttir		Menntaskólinn í Reykjavík	Menntaskólinn við Hamrahlíð
29	2014	Björn Bragi Arnarsson	Steinþór Helgi Arnsteinsson and Margrét Erla Maack		Menntaskólinn við Hamrahlíð	Borgarholtsskóli
30	2015	Björn Bragi Arnarsson	Steinþór Helgi Arnsteinsson and Margrét Erla Maack		Menntaskólinn í Reykjavík	Fjölbrautaskólinn í Garðabæ
31	2016	Björn Bragi Arnarsson	Steinþór Helgi Arnsteinsson and Bryndís Björgvinsdóttir		Menntaskólinn í Reykjavík	Kvennaskólinn í Reykjavík
32	2017	Björn Bragi Arnarsson	Steinþór Helgi Arnsteinsson and Bryndís Björgvinsdóttir		Kvennaskólinn í Reykjavík	Menntaskólinn við Hamrahlíð
33	2018	Björn Bragi Arnarsson	Bryndís Björgvinsdóttir, Vilhelm Anton Jónsson and Sævar Helgi Bragason		Fjölbrautaskólinn í Garðabæ	
34	2019	Kristjana Arnardóttir	Vilhelm Anton Jónsson, Ingileif Friðriksdóttir & Sævar Helgi Bragason		Kvennaskólinn í Reykjavík	Menntaskólinn í Reykjavík
35	2020	Kristjana Arnardóttir	Vilhelm Anton Jónsson, Ingileif Friðriksdóttir & Sævar Helgi Bragason		Menntaskólinn í Reykjavík	Borgarholtsskóli
36	2021	Kristjana Arnardóttir	Vilhelm Anton Jónsson, Ingileif Friðriksdóttir & Sævar Helgi Bragason		Verzlunarskóli Íslands	Kvennaskólinn í Reykjavík
37	2022	Kristjana Arnardóttir	Vilhelm Anton Jónsson, Ingileif Friðriksdóttir & Sævar Helgi Bragason		Menntaskólinn í Reykjavík	Fjölbrautaskólinn í Garðabæ

== Board game ==
A competitive trivia board game based on the show was introduced in 2001, containing over 2000 question cards. A lighter family edition was also published subsequently.

== Appearances in popular culture ==
The show has a prominent role in the plot of Arndís Þórarinsdóttir's 2011 novel Játningar mjólkurfernuskálds.
