= Brynjolfsson =

Brynjolfsson is an Icelandic patronymic surname, literally meaning "son of Brynjolf". Notable people with the name include:

- Ari Brynjolfsson (1927–2013), Icelandic–born American physicist
- Erik Brynjolfsson (born 1962), American academic
