= María Guðjónsdóttir =

Icelandic academic

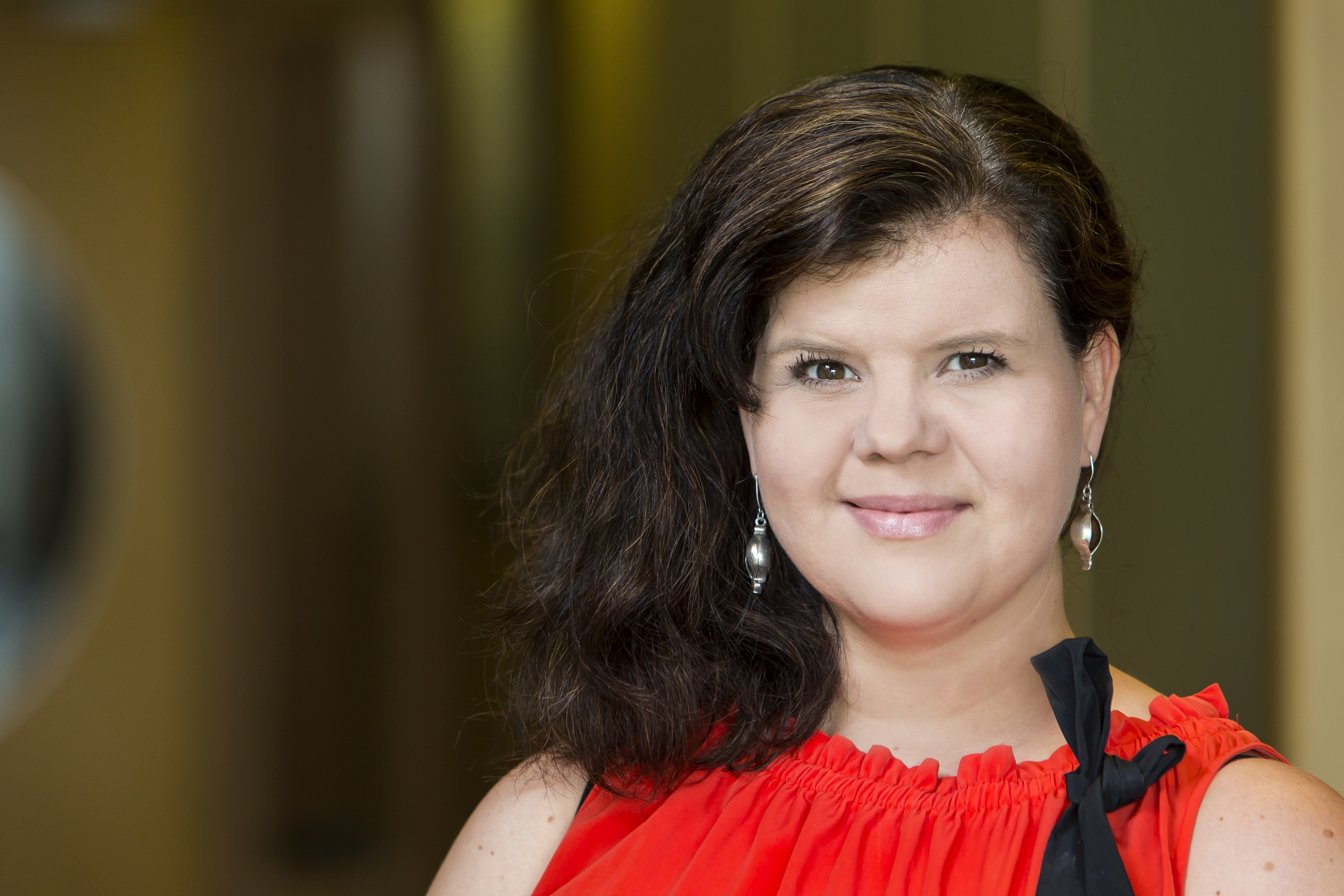
- Born: 1980 (age 45–46)
- Occupation: professor of food science
- Organization: University of Iceland

María Guðjónsdóttir (born 1980) is a professor of food science at the University of Iceland.

== Education ==
María graduated from the menntaskóli Menntaskólinn í Reykjavík in 2000, obtained a BS degree in chemical engineering from the University of Iceland in the spring of 2004, a master's degree in chemical engineering with engineering physics from the Chalmers University of Technology in 2006, and a PhD in biotechnology from the Norwegian University of Science and Technology in 2011.

== Career ==
=== Academic posts ===
Alongside her studies María worked as a project manager for the Icelandic fisheries laboratories (2005–2006) and later at the Matís food and biotech research institute (2007–2012). María worked as a post doctorate fellow at the Institut national de la recherche agronomique (INRA) in France in 2011–2012. In 2015, María got a position as assistant professor at the Technical University of Denmark (2013–2015) and then she became assistant professor at the University of Iceland in 2015. María was promoted to associate professor in 2016 and to professor in 2018, at the age of 37. As of 2019, María is the vice dean of the Faculty of Food Science and Nutrition at the University of Iceland.

=== Research and publications ===
María's research focus lies in the use of fast quality assessment methods to analyze the quality of food throughout the value chains, including both the characteristics of the raw material and their health effects upon consumption. Amongst analytical quality methods that María specializes in are various spectroscopic methods (near infrared (NIR), visual (VIS), ultraviolet (UV) etc.), nuclear magnetic resonance (NMR), and magnetic resonance imaging (MRI). María has published numerous peer-reviewed scientific articles. Detailed overviews of María's main research projects and publications can be seen on her ORCID, SCOPUS and Researchgate pages.
