= Kristján Gíslason =

Icelandic adventurer

Kristjan Gislason
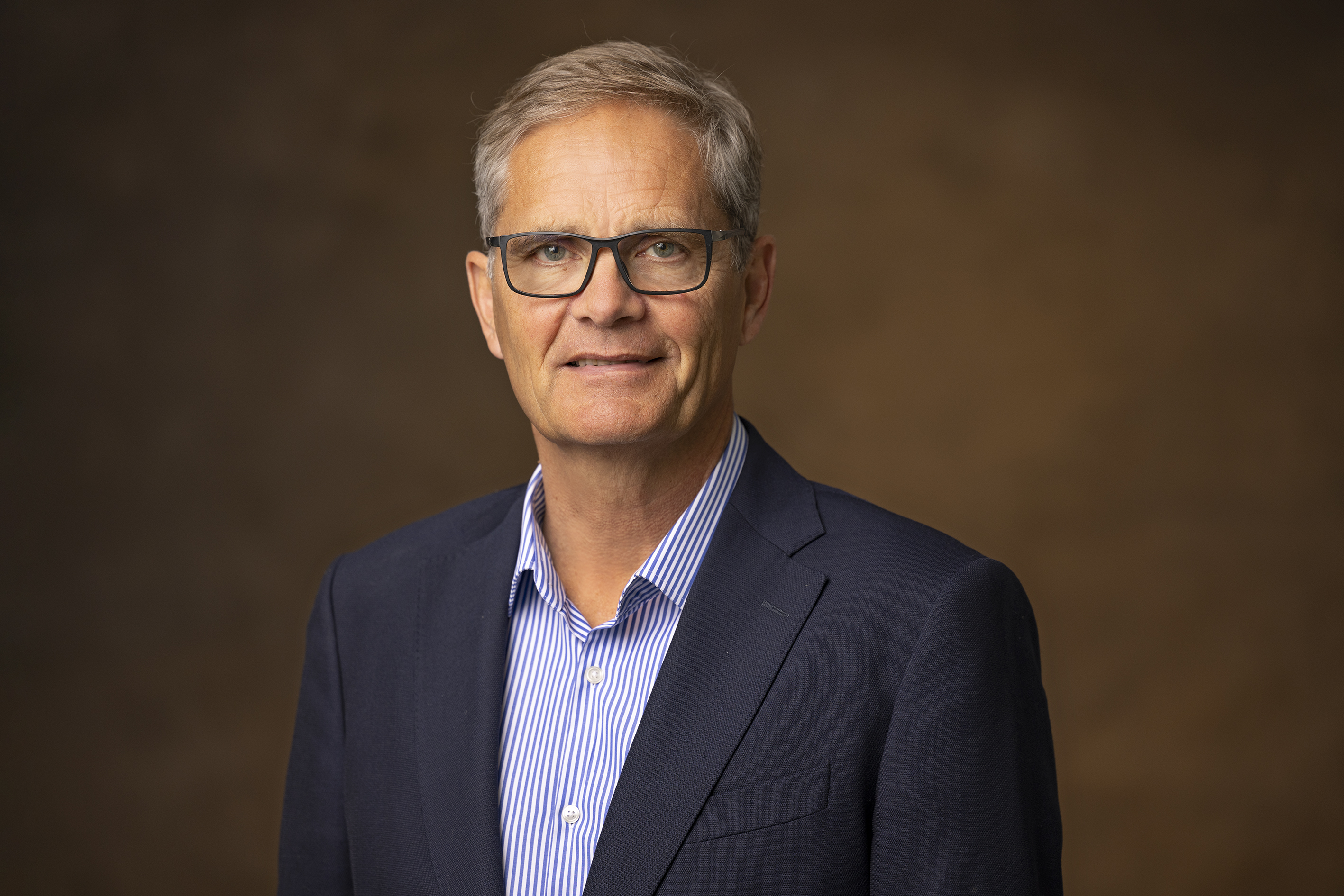
- Born: 16 April 1956 (age 70)
- Occupations: Adventurer, writer, filmmaker

Kristjan Gislason (born 16 April 1956) is an Icelandic adventurer, writer, documentary filmmaker and former businessman. He attracted national attention in Iceland for his 10-month solo journey around the world on motorcycle in 2014 and 2015 and subsequent travels, gaining the nickname Hringfarinn. Kristjan has published two photo-illustrated books about his travels and made 19 documentaries that have been featured on the Icelandic state channel, RÚV. All proceeds from these publications and documentaries have been directed to a special foundation, Hringfarinn – styrktarsjóður, which supports various charitable and goodwill projects.

Kristjan has delivered over 150 talks about his mission and travels and has been on various interviews for newspapers, magazines and podcasts (see links below).

== Career ==
Kristjan graduated from Menntaskólinn við Hamrahlíð in 1976. He was an AFS (Intercultural Programs) exchange student in Ohio, USA, from 1973 to 1974. He served as Chairman of AFS Iceland from 1974 to 1978 and again from 2008 to 2012. In 2023, he received the Distinguished Alumni Award from his alma mater in Ohio, Ottawa Hills High School. He worked as a programmer and a systems analyst for Samband íslenskra samvinnufélaga (SÍS) from 1976 to 1985 and later ran his own company, Radiomiðun, which specialized in maritime telecommunications, fish-finding equipment and navigation systems for the fishing fleet, from 1985 to 2013.

== Travels ==
With his father's encouraging words: “Never stop daring!“ in mind, he set out to plan a 3-month-long motorcycle tour around the world in 2014, at the age of 58. Originally planning to ride with other motorcyclists, he ended up riding solo – and the trip lasted 10 months instead of three. Kristján rode almost 48,000 km (close to 30,000 miles) through 35 countries on five continents.

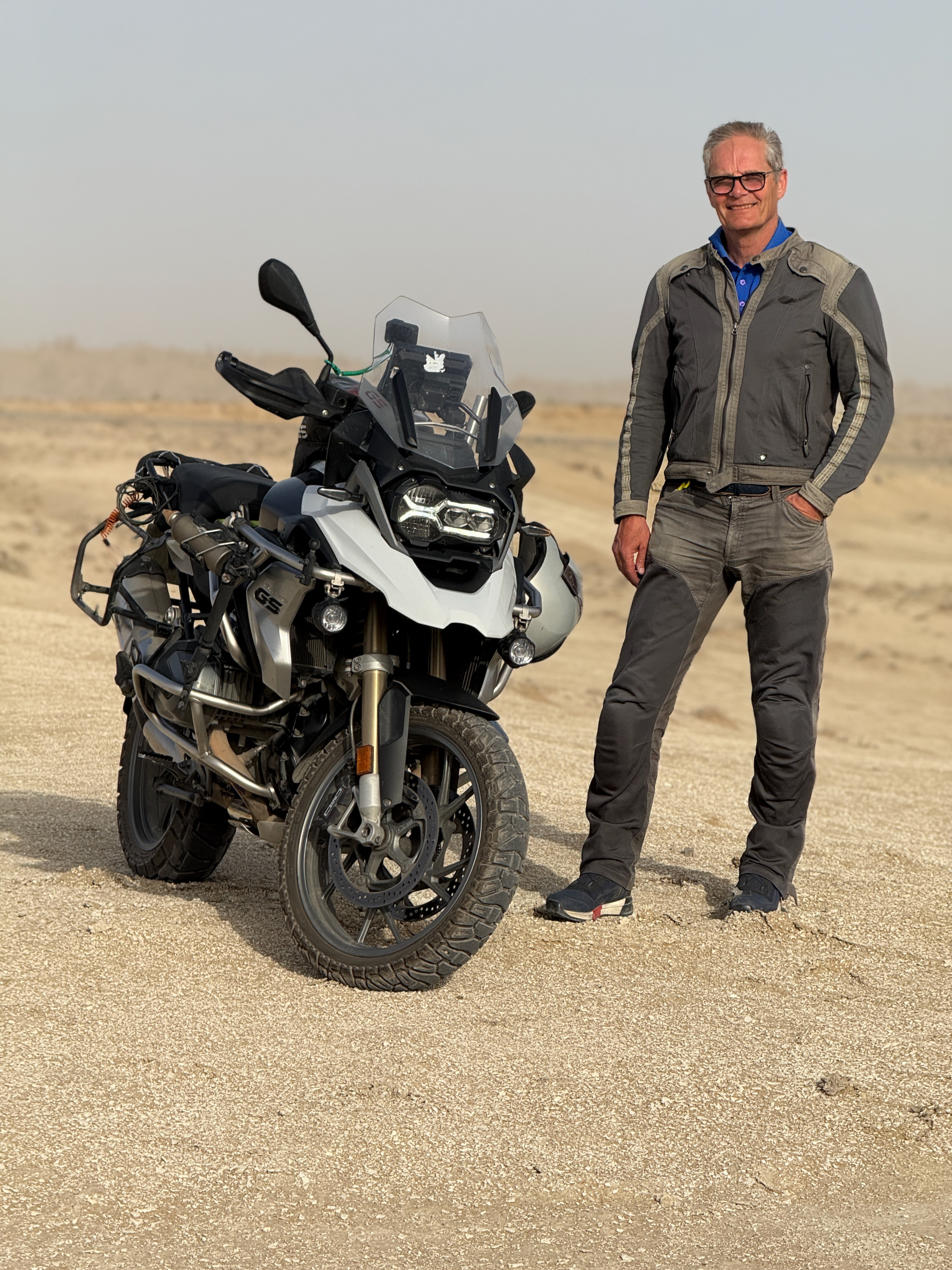

Kristjan's wife, Ásdís, joined him on many of his subsequent journeys on the motorcycle, e.g. touring the U.S., Australia, New Zealand and around Europe and later parts of the Middle East, Patagonia and Japan.

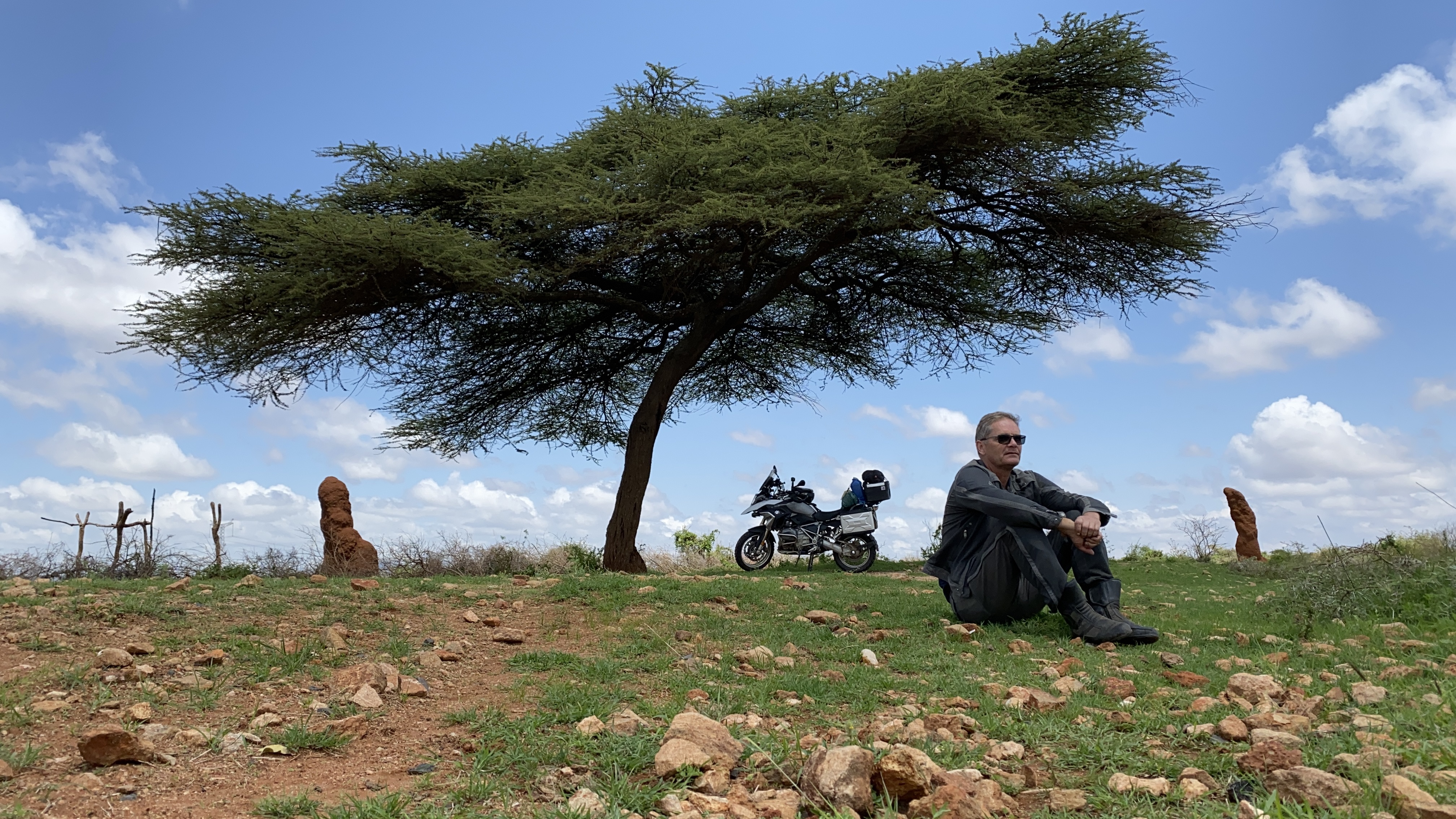

Kristjan also continued his solo motorcycle travels from 2016 to 2023, journeying through Russia, Belarus, the Middle-East and exploring 13 states in Africa. A decade after the „Round-the-World“ journey, Kristjan embarked on the adventure again, opting for a different route. Partly retracing the „Silk Road“, he travelled eastward from Central Europe to China, then continued to Hawaii before reaching the US and Canada. From there, he journeyed through Iceland and the Faroe Islands back to mainland Europe, completing his second „Round-the World“ tour where it all began, in Munich, Germany. The trip spanned 20 countries and covered a total of 27 thousand kilometers (approximately 16.800 miles).

== Personal life ==
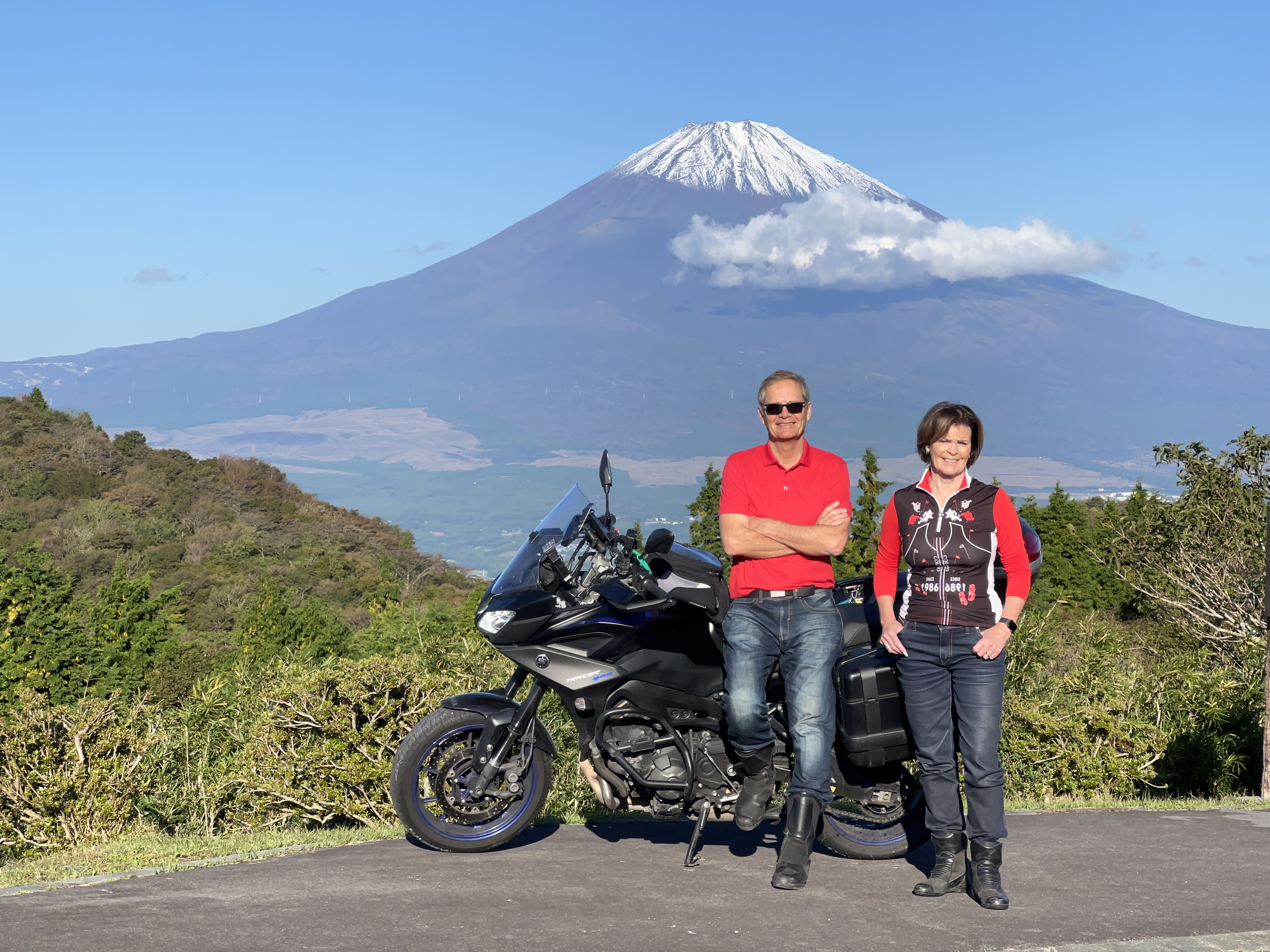

Kristjan is married to Ásdís Rósa Baldursdóttir. They have three sons: Gísli (1981), Baldur (1983), and Árni (1989), and 6 grandchildren.

== Kristjan's motorcycle tours ==
- Round-the-World #1, Aug. 12. 2014 - June 17. 2015 - approximately 10 months 47.864 km / 29.741 miles
- New Zealand, Feb. 5. 2017 - March 25. 2017 – 49 days 8.000 km / 4.971 miles
- United States - Coast to Coast, April 11. 2018 - May 16. 2018 – 36 days 8.311 km / 5.164 miles
- From Iceland to South Africa, May 28. 2018 - Jan. 9. 2020 - approximately 19 months 37.500 km / 23.301 miles
- Iceland - Nordkapp (Northeast Norway), , July 19. 2021 - Aug. 1. 2023 - approximately 2 years 12.178 km / 7.567 miles
- Patagonia (South America), Oct. 25. 2022 - Dec. 6. 2022 – 43 days 5.866 km / 3.645 miles
- Japan Sept. 25. 2023, - Nov 2. 2023 – 39 days 4.600 km / 2.858 miles
- Round-the-World #2, (through China) Sept. 17. 2024 - Nov 7. 2025 - approximately 14 months 27.115 km / 16.848 miles

== Bibliography ==
=== Travel books ===
- 2018: Hringfarinn - Einn á hjóli í hnattferð (Icelandic). Text: Helga Guðrún Johnson.
- 2018: Sliding Trough - Around the world on a motorbike, alone (English version). Text: Helga Guðrún Johnson.
- 2021: Andlit Afríku. Text: Helga Guðrún Johnson.

== Filmography ==
=== Documentaries ===
- 2019: Hringfarinn – around the world #1, three episodes broadcast on RÚV.
- 2020: Hringfarinn – touring the US and crossing Europe from Iceland to Russia, two episodes, broadcast on RÚV.
- 2022: Hringfarinn – the Africa Journey, five episodes, broadcast on RÚV.
- 2023: Hringfarinn – around Iceland, three episodes, broadcast on RÚV.
- 2024: Hringfarinn - two on a motorcycle in Patagonia, two episodes, broadcast on RÚV.
- 2025: Hringfarinn - two on a motorcycle in Japan, two episodes, broadcast on RÚV.
- 2026: Hringfarinn - on the way to Nordkapp, Norway, two episodes (to be broadcast on RÚV in fall of 2026)
