= Alvogen =

Icelandic pharmaceutical company

- Type: private
- Founded: 2009
- Founder: Róbert Wessman
- Headquarters: Pine Brook, New Jersey
- Revenue: ▲$1.1 billion (2017)
- Owners: CVC Capital Partners and Temasek Holdings
- Number of employees: 2800
- Website: www.alvogen.com

Alvogen is a private, US-based pharmaceuticals company founded in 2009. Since 2015, it has been majority-owned by CVC Capital Partners and Temasek Holdings.

== History ==
Alvogen was founded by Icelandic entrepreneur Róbert Wessman, who stepped down from his position as CEO of another generics company, Actavis, in order to found the company.

The first and still a central component of Alvogen is the 130-year old Norwich Pharmaceuticals, which was acquired by Wessman and his investors as a large-scale and certified manufacturing facility. From the early- to mid-2010s, Alvogen expanded rapidly through acquisitions. In Central and Eastern Europe it acquired companies and portfolios including Labormed in Romania. In East Asia, it acquired South Korea firms Kunwha and DreamPharma, and then operated them under the umbrella of Lotus Pharmaceuticals, a Taiwan company it purchased in 2014 and which is listed on the Taipei Stock Exchange (1795.TT). In 2016, Alvogen expanded its US footprint with the acquisition of County Line Pharmaceuticals. The history of the growth of Alvogen is the subject of a Harvard Business School case study published in 2018.

In 2017, Alvogen was valued at $4 billion and had 2800 employees spread over thirty-five countries. Beginning in 2019, the company began to spin off its international operations and divisions, some of which had grown large enough to become standalone companies, and to focus on its US operations. Alvogen's Central and Eastern Europe operations were sold to Zentiva in 2019. In 2021, it spun off Lotus to a consortium of Innobic and Wessman's investment fund Aztiq, which also bought Alvogen's Malta-based B2B licensing division Adalvo. In July 2025, EQT, a private equity fund linked to the Wallenberg family, acquired a majority stake in Adalvo for an undisclosed sum. In summer 2025, Taiwan business journal CommonWealth Magazine recognized Lotus as the sole pharmaceutical company in the country's top 50 companies and Wessman as Taiwan's top pharmaceutical entrepreneur for his leadership of Lotus. As of August 2025, Wessman was chairman of Alvotech, Alvogen, Lotus and Adalvo.

Alvogen was also the original investor in Alvotech, a company founded by Wessman in 2013 that researches and manufactures biosimilars. Alvotech is based in Reykjavik and has four research and production sites across Europe and one in India. It is listed on Nasdaq (ticker: ALVO) and also trades on Nasdaq Iceland and Nasdaq Stockholm.

== Pharmaceuticals ==
On its website, Alvogen lists dozens of products it currently offers on the US market. It specializes in products that are either difficult to make or are injectable or inhaled. It's injectables business is called Almaject.
