= Wessman =

Wessman is a surname. Notable people with the surname include:

- Anna Wessman (born 1989), Swedish javelin thrower
- Harri Wessman (born 1949), Finnish composer
- Luke Wessman, American tattoo artist and designer
- Mona Wessman (born 1948), Swedish singer
- Róbert Wessman (born 1969), Icelandic businessman
