= George Tawia Odamtten =

Ghanaian botanist and mycologist

George Tawia Odamtten FGA
- Born: July 7, 1948 (age 78); Koforidua, Gold Coast
- Education: Accra Academy
- Alma mater: University of Ghana (BSc 1973) & (MSc 1977); Wageningen University (PhD 1986)
- Scientific career
- Fields: Mycology; Plant pathology; Food irradiation
- Institutions: University of Ghana, Legon; Ghana Atomic Energy Commission
- Academic advisors: George C. Clerk

George Tawia Odamtten, FGA (born 7 July 1948) is a Ghanaian mycologist at the University of Ghana. He was professor at the Department of Plant and Environmental Biology and formerly dean of the erstwhile faculty of science at the University of Ghana. He is the editor-in-chief of the Ghana Journal of Science and a Fellow of the Ghana Academy of Arts and Sciences.

== Early life and education ==
George Odamtten was born on 7 July 1948 in Koforidua to Theophilus Ayitey Odamtten and Comfort Dewi Quarcoo. He had his early education at the Suhum Presbyterian School and the Salem School, Osu. Odamtten attended Accra Academy from 1962 to 1969. Thereafter, Odamtten studied at the University of Ghana between 1970 and 1977 for a bachelor's degree and master's degree in botany. He was employed as a research scientific officer at Ghana Atomic Energy Commission in 1978. From 1979 to 1981, he was awarded an International Atomic Energy Agency Fellowship tenable at International Facility for Food Irradiation Technology in Wageningen, the Netherlands.

On his return, Odamtten took up part-time lectureship at University of Ghana in 1981 and subsequently full-time lecturership in 1983 in the Department of Botany. He was awarded his doctorate degree in 1986 at the Wageningen University.

== Career ==
Odamtten was a senior lecturer at University of Ghana from 1987 to 1991, an associate professor from 1991 to 1996, and a professor from 1996. Odamtten served as head of the Department of Botany (now Department of Plant and Environmental Biology) at the University of Ghana on two occasions from 1988 to 1992 and from 1997 to 2001.

In 1992, Odamtten served as a member of the International Mycological Association Committee for the Development of Mycology in Africa (CODMA). That same year, he was made a founding vice president of the African Mycological Association.

In 1996, Odamtten became acting dean of the School of Graduate Studies, University of Ghana and held this post until 1998. He became chairman of the university's Volta Basin Research Project carried out from 1998 to 2004. In 2003, Odamtten was appointed dean of the Faculty of Science of the University of Ghana for a three year tenure.

Odamtten has been visiting professor to the University of Bremen in Germany and to the Wageningen University and Research Centre in the Netherlands in 1992. Odamtten has served as the editor-in-chief of the Ghana Journal of Science.

Odamtten was amongst a group academic experts who were tasked on the establishment of the University of the Gambia in the year 2000. Following this, Odamtten became a member of the university council of Pentecost University College from 2001 to 2014. Odamtten was appointed a member of the Ghana Education Service Council in 2002 and served as a member until 2008. Odamtten was a member of the university council of the University of Education, Winneba from 2004 to 2008.

In 2005, Odamtten was a member of the review panel for science education for science programmes at the University of Botswana and the WHO Expert Committee Group on Aflatoxins in Foods, Republic of the Congo. Odamtten has served as a member of the National Codex Alimentarius Commission Committee on Food Additives and Security from 2006. Odamtten serves on the expert committee for the annual review of programme of the Cocoa Research Institute of Ghana.

== Awards and honours ==
He was a one time member of the New York Academy of Sciences (1997). Odamtten was listed in the Dictionary of International Biography Vol.27,(1998) for distinguished service and cited in the Marquis Who's Who in the World (1998, 2000). He has also served as an Advisor for the International Foundation for Sciences (IFS) 2000.

== Personal life ==
George Tawia Odamtten married Catherine Neeney Wayoe in 1974. He has three daughters from this marriage. He is a Christian, a church council elder and a patron to Christian Groups in higher institutions in Ghana.

== Selected publications ==
- (contrib.) IFFIT Report No. 10 – Studies on the Technological Feasibility of the Application of Dry Or Moist Heat to Grains and Grain Products Prior to Gamma Irradiation: Short Communication, 1980;
- (contrib.) IFFIT Report No. 11 – in Vitro Studies on the Effect of the Combination Treatment of Heat and Irradiation on Spores of Aspergillus Flavus Link NRRL 5906, 1980;
- (contrib.) IFFIT Report No. 12 – Control of Moulds Causing Deterioration of Maize Grains in Storage by Combination Treatment: A Preliminary Model Study with Aspergillus Flavus Link NRRL 5906, 1980;
- (contrib.) IFFIT Report No. 13 – Production of Aflatoxin B1 by Aspergillus Flavus Link in Submerged Static Culture After Combination Treatment of Heat and Gamma Irradiation, 1980;
- (contrib.) IFFIT Report No 15 – Production of Aflatoxin B1 During Storage of Maize Grains Subjected to the Combination Treatment of Heat and Gamma Irradiation, 1980;
- (contrib.) IFFIT Report No. 16 – Preliminary Studies on the Effect of the Combination Treatment of Heat and Gamma Irradiation on the Keeping Quality of Animal Feed and Cotton Seeds, 1980;
- Studies on the Possibilities of Using a Combination of Moist Heat and Radiation to Control Mouldiness in Dried Cocoa Beans, 1980;
- Fungi, Man's Allies Or Enemies?, 1988.
- Odamtten, G. T.; Clerk, G. C. (1988) "Effect of metabolites of Aspergillus niger and Trichoderma viride on development and structure of radicle of cocoa (Theobroma cacao) seedlings" Plant and Soil, 106 (2): 285–288
