= Róbert Wessman =

Icelandic business executive

- Born: Wilhelm Róbert Wessman
- Education: Menntaskólinn við Sund
- Alma mater: University of Iceland
- Occupations: Entrepreneur; Business Executive; CEO of Alvotech
- Organization(s): Alvogen; Lotus; Adalvo; Actavis
- Known for: Founder of Alvotech, Alvogen, Aztiq
- Website: robertwessman.com

Wilhelm Róbert Wessman (born 4 October 1969) is an Icelandic businessman, and the founder and leader of several pharmaceutical and biotechnology companies including Actavis, Alvogen, Adalvo, Lotus and Alvotech.

== Early life ==
Wessman was born in Reykjavík on 4 October 1969 to Wilhelm Wessman, a business person, and Ólöf Svafarsdóttir Wessman, a beautician. He grew up in Seltjarnarnes and moved to Mosfellsbær when he was six years old. He graduated from Menntaskólinn við Sund high school and received a bachelor's degree in business administration from the University of Iceland in 1993. After graduating, he worked for Icelandic shipping firm Samskip for seven years, first in the finance department, then as CEO of its operations in Germany. During that time he also taught mathematics on a part-time basis at the University of Iceland. Wessman has spoken at length about his struggles with dislexia in school but also credits those challenges with giving him determination and the ability to focus on big-picture goals in his later professional life.

== Career ==
Since 1999, Wessman's career has been focused on the generics and biosimilars sectors of the pharmaceuticals industry. The two domains differ significantly in terms of what they make and sell, but the business challenge common to both is to make and distribute lower-cost versions of brand-name therapeutics whose patent protection has expired.

=== Delta, Pharmaco and Actavis ===
In 1999, Wessman was appointed CEO of Delta, a generic drug manufacturer in Reykjavik. Following a merger with another Icelandic pharmaceutical company, Pharmaco, in 2002, Delta was rebranded as Actavis in 2004. Wessman's tenure at Activis was characterized by rapid growth and expansion into international markets through a series of acquisitions across Europe, Asia, and the US. By 2004, the company had acquired 16 companies and had operations in 25 countries, manufacturing and selling hundreds of products. In 2005, Actavis, traded on the Icelandic stock exchange, had a market capitalization of $1.9bn. In 2006, it acquired two US generics companies to enter the US market, subsequently acquiring additional manufacturing plants in the US, Russia, Romania and India. In 2008, Wessman stepped down from his position as CEO of Actavis, by which time it had grown to 11,000 employees and was one of the biggest generic drug companies in the world. Wessman's business strategy at Actavis was documented in a 2008 case study published by Harvard Business School entitled ‘Robert Wessman and Actavis’ “Winning Formula.”’

=== Alvogen ===
In 2009 Wessman founded the biotechnology company Alvogen. Alvogen started by acquiring a distressed generics maker in New York, and R&D capabilities and product portfolios in New Jersey. Over the following five years, built on a string of acquisitions, Wessman expanded production, the product portfolio and marketing efforts focusing on Eastern Europe and South Asia, then acquiring major production sites in Taiwan and South Korea. By 2017, Alvogen was estimated to be worth $4bn. Wessman's strategy in building Alvogen has been the subject of two Harvard Business School case studies. Since 2021, Alvogen's former subsidiaries Lotus, based in Taiwan, and Malta-based B2B licensing arm Adalvo have been spun off as companies in their own right, with Wessman as chairman and his holding company Aztiq as major shareholder. In July 2025, EQT, a private equity fund linked to the Wallenberg family, acquired a majority stake in Adalvo for an undisclosed sum. In summer 2025, Wessman was named Taiwan's top pharmaceutical entrepreneur by CommonWealth Magazine for his leadership of Lotus.

=== Alvotech ===
In 2013, Wessman founded Alvotech, a company that manufactures biosimilars. It was founded with a $250m investment from Alvogen to build its headquarters and manufacturing facility on the University of Iceland's campus in central Reykjavik. Alvotech's strategy to compete in this market has been to focus solely on biosimilars development and production, with vertically integrated capabilities, enabling tight control over quality and costs, and with commercial partnerships to market its products around the world. Wessman has said that Iceland was not an obvious place to build up a biosimilars company but that he was committed to doing so in his native country. By 2024, Alvotech had attracted people from some 70 countries to work for it, principally at the headquarters in Reykjavik. He estimated that over $1 billion had been invested in Alvotech before it began to bring in product revenue.

In June, 2022, Alvotech was listed on the Nasdaq stock market in New York and Iceland through a merger with Special-purpose acquisition company (or SPAC) Oaktree Acquisition Corp. II, trading under the ticker symbol ALVO. In 2025, following the acquisition of the R&D operations and a lead biosimilar candidate of Stockholm-based Xbrane, the company carried out equity placements in Sweden and listed on Nasdaq Stockholm as well.

In 2024, the company's manufacturing facility in Reykjavik was certified by the US Food and Drug Administration (FDA) and the company was able to begin selling its first product on the US market: Simlandi, a biosimilar to the high-dose version of autoimmune therapy Humira. In early 2025, the company launched a second product, Selarsdi, a biosimilar to Stelara, on the US and European markets. It was marketing both in several regions around the world and in August 2025, a third product, a biosimilar to the retinal disease drug Eylea, was approved in Europe. The company expected several additional products to be approved in the US, Europe and other markets in the remainder of 2025. Alvotech had revenue of $492m in 2024, its first year with significant product sales, and guided for revenue of $600-700m for 2025. The company continued its strategy of vertical integration by acquiring its former packaging supplier, Swiss-based Ivers-Lee, in July 2025.

== Personal life ==
Wessman and his wife have six children between them. He is an avid and formerly competitive cyclist, and owns a vineyard at Saint Cernin in southwestern France. Maison Wessman has launched a wine label with musician Nora Jones and a collection with Icelandic rock band Kaleo's lead singer Jökull Júlíusson.
