= Stefán Jón Hafstein =

Icelandic politician (born 1955)

Stefán Jón Hafstein (born February 18, 1955) is an author and independent consultant in various capacities (2025) He was an employee of the Ministry for Foreign Affairs in Iceland, formerly ambassador to the UN Rome based agencies, FAO, WFP and IFAD (2018-2021). He is an independent consultant and lecturer since mid 2024 when he left the MFA to pursue and independent field of work in environmental issues, communications and policymaking. In 2022-2024 he was a Special Envoy for Ocean Affairs at the Ministry. He was previously with the Icelandic International Development Agency (ICEIDA) since 2007. He was the country director in Malawi from 2008 to 2012, but previously a project manager in Namibia. Since 2015 he was the country director in Uganda.

He has a career as a politician, journalist and author. He founded a daily magazine programme for Rás 2 and directed daily radio episodes for Iceland State Broadcasting service where he had a diverse career. He was the editor of the national daily newspaper Dagur (Dagur-Timinn) 1997-1999. He worked for the independent TV station Stöð 2 and produced and directed as well as hosting a string of influential current affairs programmes.

Stefán was elected City Councillor in Reykjavik for the Reykjavíkurlistinn 2002, and the Social Democrats in 2005 but he received a leave of absence in the city council at the beginning of 2007 for two years to work as a project manager at the Development agency of Iceland (ICEIDA) in Namibia. He was ICEIDA country director in Malawi 2008–2012, working for ICEIDA in the capital from 2012, latr to assume a similar post in Uganda (2025-2018)

His spouse is Guðrún Kristín Sigurðardóttir.

== Life ==
Stefán's parents were Hannes Þórður Hafstein and Sigrún Stefánsdóttir (both deceased). Stefán's primary school was Vogaskóli and he graduated in 1975 from Menntaskólinn við Tjörnina. He studied English and literature at the University of Iceland and obtained a BA degree in media studies from the Polytechnic of Central London in 1979.

Upon graduation Stefán returned home to Iceland and worked as a journalist and programmer at RÚV 1979–1982. He undertook postgraduate studies in communication studies at the University of Pennsylvania 1983–85 and graduated with a MA degree.

Upon graduating, he worked for a time as an envoy for the Red Cross in Geneva and Ethiopia and held positions of responsibility in that capacity elsewhere. He served as program director of Rás 2 (National Broadcasting Service) and as a programmer for Icelandic television and radio. He presented the question contest Gettu betur in 1991–1994. He was editor of the newspaper Dagur-Tíminn (later Dagur) from 1997 to 1999, with his own business in 2000 and served as head of new media and operations manager with the media and publishing company Edda 2001–2002.

== Political career ==
Stefán took part in the preparation and establishment of the Social Democrats in 1999 and 2000. He was elected Chairman of the executive Committee of Social Democrats from 2001 to 2005. He was elected as City Councillor in Reykjavik in 2002 for the Reykjavíkurlistinn, where he is a representative of the Social Democrats. He won first place in the list of the Social Democratic primaries in 2003. Has served as chairman of the city council, city council president, chairman of the education council, chairman of the Culture and Tourism Board and the chairman of the district Grafarvogur. He was chairman of Vik Maritime Museum from 2004. He was a candidate for the city council in 2005 for the Social Democrats and was elected, sitting on the education board, culture and tourism board, and the board of Reykjavík Energy for a time.

Stefán Jón Hafstein got leave from work in the city council at the beginning of 2007 for two years to work as a project manager at the ICEIDA in Namibia and ceased his work in politics when he became ICEIDA country director in Malawi in 2008. He has worked on those matters since.

== Books ==
Stefán has published seven books:

- Sagnaþulir samtímans, fjölmiðlar á öld upplýsinga (1987)
- Guðirnir eru geggjaðir, personal documentary from Africa (1990)
- New York New York (1992) Documentary.
- Fluguveiðisögur (Fly fishing stories) (2000) (see Flugur.is)
- Fluguveiðiráð (Fly fishing guide) (2013)
- Afríka – ást við aðra sýn Essays from Africa. (2014)
- Heimurin eins og hann er (2022) available in Enghlish as the World as it is since 2024. Chronicles of the complex interconnectedness of the climate crisis. loss of biodiversity and the food systems.
