= Nærbuxnaverksmiðjan =

Children's novel by Arndís Þórarinsdóttir

First edition

Nærbuxnaverksmiðjan ('The Underpants Factory') is a children's novel by Arndís Þórarinsdóttir, published in Reykjavík in 2018 by Mál og menning.

== Form ==
The novel is a short prose narrative in ten chapters, each of which includes a full-page monochrome illustration by Sigmundur Breiðfjörð Þorgeirsson and a number of smaller illustrations of different, sometimes outlandish, kinds of underpants. Chapters begin with a subheading often including pants-related puns on well known Icelandic proverbs and phrases, such as 'blindur er brókarlaus maður' ('a trouserless person is blind') for blindur er bóklaus maður ('a bookless person is blind').

== Summary ==
The protagonists are Gutti, the most diligent child in his school, and Ólína, the most troublesome.

Near the beginning of the story, Gutti learns that the underpants factory that dominates his neighbourhood has just been closed by the authorities. After school, he goes to the home of his grandmother, who works in the factory, expecting to find her there. She does not return, but Ólína finds Gutti there and convinces him to investigate the factory.

Climbing in through an open window, the duo explore forgotten sections of the building, discovering a large colony of rabbits in a fabric store, a dysfunctional robot called BlúnduRASS 3000, a community of anarchist teenagers revelling in the lack of a mobile phone signal, and a group of partying retirees hiding in the factory to avoid entering retirement homes. These last direct Gutti to his missing grandmother, who turns out secretly to have been running the factory single-handed since most human employees were replaced by machines, and thus to have been sheltering the various misfits inhabiting the factory.

Gutti learns that, no longer able to keep pace with the global underpants market, she has been unable to sustain the business, and that the factory is about to be demolished. He rushes out to reason with the demolition crew, eventually forestalling their activities by slashing the tyres of one of their machines.

The story closes with a retrospective account of how Gutti, his grandmother, and Ólína succeed in winning official approval to turn the factory into a heritage and cultural centre called Rumpurinn.

== Reviews ==
- Katrín Lilja Jónsdóttir, 'Nærbuxur!', Lestrarklefinn (24 October 2018).
- Brynhildur Björnsdóttir, 'Babb í Brókarenda', Fréttablaðið, 18.266 (10 November 2018), 55.
- Ingibjörg Fríða Helgadóttir and Sölvi Þór Jörundsson, 'Bókaormaspjall - Nærbuxnaverksmiðjan', Bókaormaráð KrakkaRÚV 2018 (7 December 2018).
