= Játningar mjólkurfernuskálds =

2011 novel by Arndís Þórarinsdóttir

First edition (publ. Mál og menning)

Játningar mjólkurfernuskálds ('confessions of a milk-carton poet') is the first novel by Arndís Þórarinsdóttir, published in Reykjavík by Mál og menning in 2011. It was nominated for the 2013 Nordic Children's Book Prize.

The title refers to the Icelandic custom of publishing children's poems on the side of milk cartons; the main character of the novel has been published in this way, and it marks her as a goody two-shoes and overachiever.

== Summary ==
The novel is a first-person story of Halla, who is the daughter of a gay male couple, Aðalsteinn and Tryggvi. She is 13, from the affluent Vesturbær district of Reykjavík, doing spectacularly well in her studies, given to wearing pink, and popular among her classmates. However, she is caught in possession of cannabis and expelled from her school and abandoned by her old friends, most prominently her best friend Jenný. Meanwhile, the 2008 Icelandic financial crisis means that her family has to move to her aunt Salóme's house in a working-class district, where Halla starts in a new school.

Labelled as a troublemaker at her new school, not least by her maths teacher Björgvinur and the local alpha-female Bára Sif, who bullies Halla and emerges as the book's main antagonist, Halla decides to live up to the label and be a 'vandræðaunglingur' (teenage delinquent). She shaves her head; endeavours to become friends with the Goth Anna Ninja and her friend Alexander Filippus, who, it emerges, has depression; tries to start smoking; and concludes that she will not attend confirmation (a traditional and important rite of passage for Icelandic teenagers).

However, Halla's nerdy tendencies are spotted by a popular and academically successful boy, Emil, who tries to convince her to compete on the school team for the TV quiz show Gettu betur. Halla fancies Emil and wants to participate, but is afraid to dilute her new, delinquent identity.

As Halla explores her new situation, she starts to understand that she had perhaps been the Bára Sif of her previous school, a realisation which promotes her character development. Anna Ninja introduces Halla to the art of shoplifting in the shopping centre Smáralind, and also to a range of political issues: 'illegal distribution of copyrighted material on the Internet (in favor), the ban on head scarves in schools (opposed), gender quotas (in favor) and stem cell research (in favor)'.

Halla's friendship with Anna Ninja is disrupted when Anna discovers that Halla has been lying about her identity and that she is a milk-carton poet. Emil supports Halla, and she explains to him that she only got involved in selling cannabis because Jenný's elder brother Leifur claimed it would raise money for his baby brother Ármann to receive medical treatment in the USA. Shortly after this, however, she discovers that Leifur has been arrested and was in fact dealing for his own gain. She confesses the story to her parents and in the knowledge that her name has been cleared attempts to return to her former milk-carton poet identity, agreeing to compete in Gettu betur. The school wins, to Halla's delight. Jenný renews her friendship with Halla and looks forward to attending confirmation. But Halla finds that she cannot readily return to her previous identity, and Anna Ninja mocks her for her theologically inconsistent about-turn on attending confirmation.

The resolution of the novel comes when Halla discovers that Anna Ninja and Alexander are planning to protest at the general awfulness of the world by throwing paint at politicians. She is at Emil's at the time, and is shortly to be visited by Jenný. Halla realises that this protest is both too vague and too violent to achieve a useful outcome and eventually convinces Anna and Alexander, along with Emil, to come to her house, where they meet Jenný. Halla is thus able to draw together her different friends in a common purpose, distilling her own new sense of self. Halla leads the group in deciding to paint a huge banner to hang on the parliament building in an act of civil disobedience, protesting on themes close to their hearts: Reykjavík's children's hospital, Chad's fourth civil war, child obesity and economically stressed parents' excessive reliance on daycare services, and poor support for children with mental health problems. Early the next morning, the children hang the banner on the building and tip off the press.

An epilogue explains that Halla decides not to take confirmation on theological grounds, but attends as an audience member in celebration of her friends' confirmation. It emerges that the banner enjoys international media coverage; provokes parliamentary debates on the situation of children in Iceland and the situation in Chad; and fetches up in the National Gallery of Iceland.

== Reviews and press coverage ==
- Interview in Morgunblaðið, 24 October 2011
- Árni M., 'Hrunið í ljóðum og sögum', Bækur, 20 November 2011, p. 1.
- Þórdís Gísladóttir, 'Höfundur Játninga mjólkurfernuskálds svarar spurningum', Druslubækur og doðrantar 9 September 2011
