= Rán Ísold Eysteinsdóttir =

Icelandic actress and model

Rán Ísold Eysteinsdóttir (born 1995) is an Icelandic actress and model. She is known for her role as Dagný in the Icelandic TV-series Trapped.

== Early life ==
Rán is from Keflavík, Iceland and graduated from Verzlunarskóli Íslands in 2015. At college she was a member in the student's council. In 2014 the art department of her university (where she acted as president) set up a different take on Romeo and Juliet. This time two girls were in love and the play was called Romea and Juliet.

== Personal life ==
In a 2014 interview Rán said that her favorite superhero was Deadpool, (because he is an anti-hero), and that she enjoys reading The Watchmen comics. Her favorite bands and musicians were Arcade Fire, Justin Timberlake and Ed Sheeran, and her favorite TV-series were Game of Thrones, The Office and Orange is the New Black.
