= Kristinn Ármannsson =

Kristinn Ármannson (1895–1966) was the rector of Menntaskólinn í Reykjavík from 1956 to 1965. He is the author of Latin Grammar, a book still used in all schools that teach Latin in Iceland.
