= Andrés Indriðason =

Icelandic television producer (1941–2020)

- Born: 7 August 1941; Reykjavík, Iceland
- Died: 10 July 2020 (aged 78)
- Occupation(s): Television producer, author
- Years active: 1966–2020
- Employer: RÚV
- Notable work: Veiðiferðin
- Television: Gettu betur Áramótaskaupið
- Spouse: Valgerður Ingimarsdóttir
- Children: 2
- Awards: Edda Awards

Andrés Indriðason (7 August 1941 – 10 July 2020) was an Icelandic television producer, director, screenwriter, playwright, author of children's books, and a child actor.

== Career ==
Andrés worked as a producer for the public television channel Sjónvarpið from its foundation in 1966 until 1985, and has since been a freelance producer. He was the executive producer of the quiz show Gettu betur for 25 years.

== Filmography ==
Writer:

- 1996Áramótaskaup 1996 (TV Movie)
- 1991Áramótaskaup 1991 (TV Movie)
- 1989Áramótaskaup 1989 (TV Special)
- 1983Áramótaskaup 1983 (TV Special)
- 1982Ég mundi segja hó (TV Movie)
- 1980Veiðiferðin
- 1974Áramótaskaup (TV Special)
- 1966Áramótaskaup (TV Special)

Hide Producer:

- 1986Gettu betur (TV Series) (executive producer - 1991)

Hide Production manager:

- 1976Undraland (TV Movie) (unit manager)
