= Zentiva =

Czech pharmaceutical company

Zentiva Group, a.s.

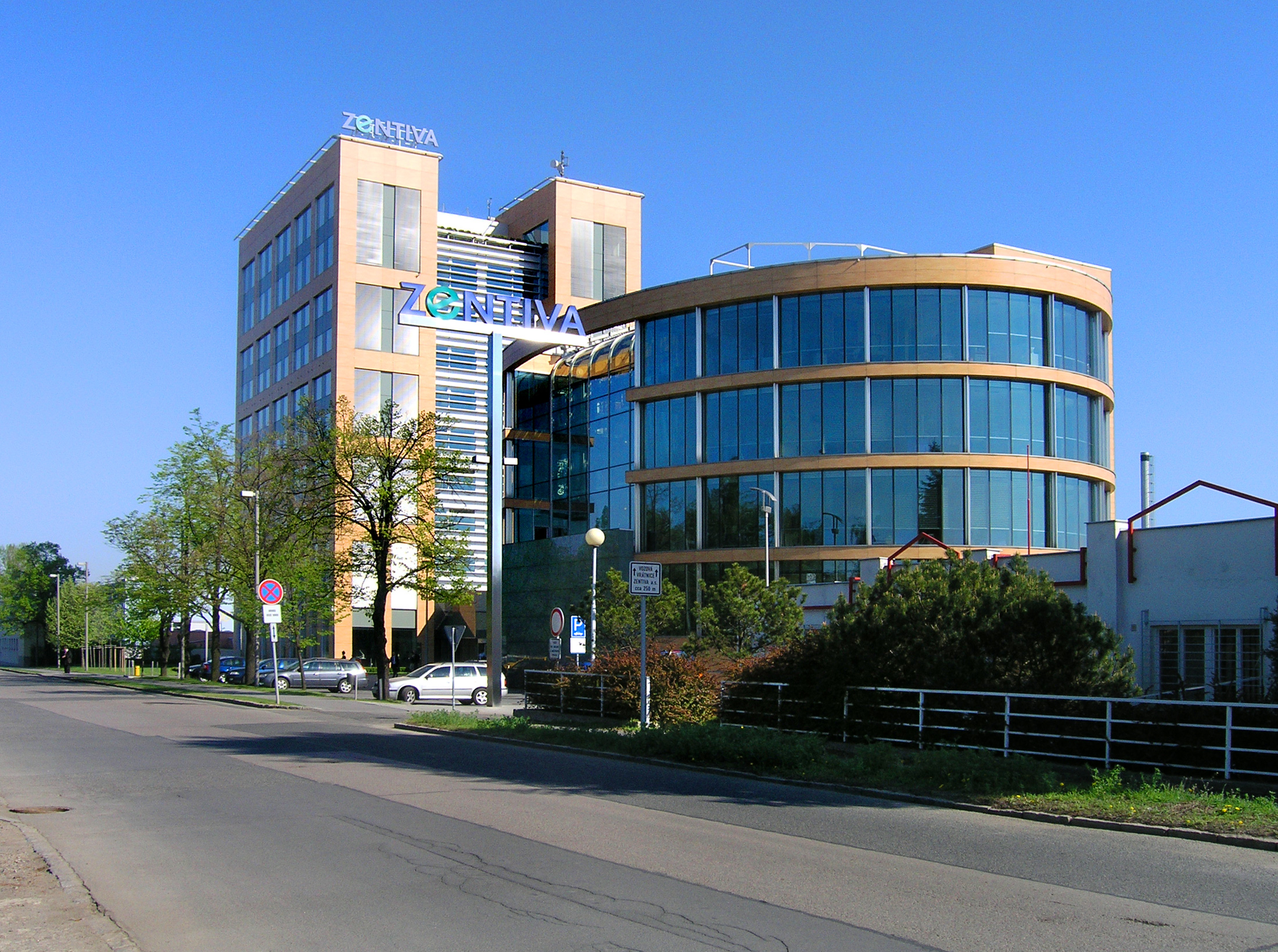
- Company type: Private
- Industry: Pharmaceuticals
- Headquarters: Prague, Czech Republic
- Key people: Steffen Saltofte (Chief Executive Officer)
- Revenue: 1,570,700,000 euro (2024)
- Operating income: 163,100,000 euro (2024)
- Net income: −65,800,000 euro (2024)
- Total assets: 3,011,100,000 euro (2024)
- Number of employees: 5,143 (2024)
- Parent: Advent International
- Website: zentiva.com

Zentiva is a pharmaceutical company based in Prague, Czech Republic. The company is developing, manufacturing and marketing a wide range of generic and OTC products.

Zentiva employs more than 4 700 people across Europe and has three manufacturing sites, in Prague, Bucharest and Ankleshwar. Since 2018, Zentiva is wholly owned by private equity firm Advent International; it was formerly, since 2008, a subsidiary of Sanofi.

== History of Zentiva ==
The roots of the Czech pharmaceutical company date back to 1488 with At the Black Eagle's pharmacy (“U Černého Orla”) located in the Prague city center: Malá Strana. In 1857 the pharmacy was bought by Benjamin & Karel Fragner (1824-1886). His expansion plans were started by his son Dr. Karel Fragner (1861-1926) and further expanded by Dr. Ing. Jiří Fragner (1900-1977). He, together with his brother, an architect Jaroslav Fragner, built and designed a new modern pharmaceutical factory in Dolní Měcholupy, which is now a part of Prague. Today Zentiva's headquarters are located on the original factory premises.

The factory “Benjamin Fragner” started to produce medicines in August 1930. Its profitability was set upon a solid bedrock of active substances, with which intensive Research and Development started. During World War II, after Czech universities were shut down following Nazi-occupation, the Fragner factory became a refuge for many notable specialists. For example, one of the first successful isolation of penicillin (BF Mykoin 510) was achieved on this site.

In 1946, the company is nationalised by the Czech government and the factory and the pharmacy are split apart. The factory became part of SPOFA (United Pharmaceutical Enterprises) employing 750. It was the leading pharmaceutical site in post-war Czechoslovakia. In the early sixties, to satisfy the demand of growing need of dosage forms, the question of upgrading the site to further increase the manufactured amounts was raised. The upgrade was completed in 1979 and led to the construction of new modern production facilities.

Starting with the Velvet Revolution in 1989 the company went through a series of significant organisational and ownership changes. In 1993, the company's name was changed from Léčiva a.s. to Zentiva k.s. Later in 1998, Zentiva's management acquired a majority of shares and established a new focus on branded generic medicines. In 2003 a new corporate brand name was introduced: Zentiva CZ s.r.o.. In the same year, the leading pharmaceutical company from Slovakia (Slovakofarma) was added to Zentiva portfolio. In 2004, Zentiva is listed at the Prague and London Stock Exchanges. Zentiva also expanded to Poland and Russia and other markets of central and eastern Europe. Later in 2005: Sicomed (leading generic company in Romania nowadays Zentiva SA) was acquired and added to Zentiva portfolio.

In the beginning of 2007, Zentiva increased its activity in Hungary and acquired Eczacibaşi Generic Pharmaceuticals (leading Turkish manufacturer). The year 2008 marked the acquisition of Zentiva by the French holding Sanofi and decided to make it its European generics platform. Zentiva became then part of the Sanofi Generics Franchise.

In 2018, Advent International bought the European division of Sanofi's Generics business – Zentiva. Transaction of total worth 1,919 bn€. . Zentiva with the support of Advent International, one of the biggest equity funds, became independent.

Following the acquisition by Advent International, Zentiva entered in a fast-paced series of acquisition to build up its position in generics and OTC markets, in and outside Europe. In April 2019, Zentiva acquired Creo Pharmaceuticals, a UK-based subsidiary of the US-based Amneal Pharmaceuticals since 2013. Followed, in May, by Solacium the Romania-based pharmaceutical company expanding both its Generics and OTC footprint.

In January 2022, Zentiva received the Top Employer recognition from the Top Employer Institute in the Czech Republic and Romania.

In April 2026, Zentiva was acquired by GTCR.

== Acquisitions History ==
- 1857: Black Eagle Pharmacy bought by Benjamin & Karel Fragner
- 1946: Pharmacy and Factory split apart
- 2003: acquisition of Slovakofarma
- 2005: acquisition of Sicomed
- 2007: Zentiva acquired Eczacibaşi Generic Pharmaceuticals
- 2008: Sanofi acquired Zentiva
- 2018: Advent International acquired Zentiva
- 2019:
  - April: acquisition of Creo Pharmaceuticals
  - May: acquisition of Solacium Pharmaceuticals
  - September: signing of an agreement to acquire manufacturing site in Ankleshwar, India
  - October: signing of a definitive agreement to acquire the Central and Eastern European Business of Alvogen
- 2020:
  - April: Acquisition of Alvogen CEE Business
  - May: Acquisition of Sanofi's manufacturing site in Ankleshwar, India
