= Eysteinn Björnsson =

Icelandic writer

Eysteinn Björnsson (born Stöðvarfjörður January 9, 1942) is an Icelandic writer.

== Career ==
From 1954 Eysteinn lived in Siglufjörður, graduated from Menntaskólinn á Akureyri in 1961, and went on to study Icelandic, English, and geography at the University of Iceland until 1967. 1984 saw him studying English literature at Trinity College, Dublin; in 1988 he took his Cand Mag degree in English literature from the University of Iceland with the dissertation 'The men of the soil and mother earth: a comparison of the trilogy A Scots Quair by Lewis Grassic Gibbon and Independent People and Salka Valka by Halldor Kiljan Laxness'. For much of his life, Eysteinn taught in Icelandic schools, until retiring in 1991, when began to focus on his writing. He has written prose, poetry, journalism, and for television and radio.

== Major publications ==
=== Children's books ===
- Út í blámann (2002) (Into the Blue)
- Stelpan sem talar við snigla (2006) (The Girl who Talks to Snails)
- Hrafnaspark (2010) (Scrawl)

=== Poetry ===
- Dagnætur (1993) (Light Nights)
- Fylgdu mér slóð (1998) (Follow my Trail)
- Logandi kveikur (2005) (A Flaming Wick)

=== Novels ===
- Bergnuminn (1989) (Petrified)
- Snæljós (1996) (Snowlight)
- Í skugga heimsins: skáldsaga (1999)

=== Translations ===
- Saga um strák (2004) (Nick Hornby, About a Boy)
