= Menntaskólinn á Ísafirði =

Location
- Torfnes; Ísafjörður; Iceland; 66.0738°N 23.1322°W

Information
- Type: Gymnasium
- Established: 1970
- Principal: Jón Reynir Sigurvinsson
- Gender: Mixed
- Age range: 16-20
- Newspaper: Sólrisublaðið
- Website: https://misa.is/

Menntaskólinn á Ísafirði is an Icelandic gymnasium. It is located in Ísafjörður in the Westfjords.

The school year consists of two semesters, fall and spring. Each semester students take a full-time load of courses worth two or three credits each. Over three years, they take a total of 140+ credits and matriculate with an Icelandic Stúdentspróf which is the standard prerequisite for university admission in Iceland. This qualification is also accepted for admission to universities around the world.

== History ==
The school was founded in 1970 and its first principal was Jón Baldvin Hannibalsson. Ólína Þorvarðardóttir was the principal from 2001 until her resignation in 2006.

=== Principals ===
- Jón Baldvin Hannibalsson (1970–1979)
- Björn Teitsson (1979–2001)
- Ólína Þorvarðardóttir (2001–2006)
- Ingibjörg S. Guðmundsdóttir (2006–2007)
- Jón Reynir Sigurvinsson (2007–2022)
- Heiðrún Tryggvadóttir (2022–present)

== Notable alumni ==
=== Artists ===
- Eiríkur Örn Norðdahl, writer
- Erpur Eyvindarson, musician
- Þórunn Arna Kristjánsdóttir, actress and singer

=== Athletes ===
- Andri Rúnar Bjarnason, footballer

=== Journalists ===
- Ingi Freyr Vilhjálmsson, investigative reporter

=== Politicians ===
- Einar Kristinn Guðfinnsson, former member of Alþingi
- Ólína Þorvarðardóttir, former member of Alþingi
