= Arndís Þórarinsdóttir =

Icelandic children's author (born 1982)

Arndís Þórarinsdóttir (born 1982) is an Icelandic children's author.

== Biography ==
Arndís studied at Menntaskólinn í Reykjavík, and took a BA in literature at the University of Iceland, and an MA in creative writing at Goldsmiths, University of London. She took a further MA in creative writing at the University of Iceland in 2018, with a thesis entitled Vetur fram á vor: Skáldsaga fyrir börn ("From Winter to Spring: A Novel for Children"). She is the head of the ancient and popular culture departments of the Bókasafn Kópavogs (Kópavogur Public Library). She had joined the board of IBBY Iceland by 2008, and was its president around 2011.

In 2019, her novel Nærbuxnanjósnararnir was nominated for the Icelandic Literary Prize in the children's and young people's section, and in 2020 her Blokkin á heimsenda, co-written with Hulda Sigrún Bjarnadóttir, won the Barnabókaverðlaun Guðrúnar Helgadóttur (Guðrún Helgadóttir Children's Book Award). Arndís's 2022 novel Kollhnís was awarded the Icelandic Literary Prize.

== Works ==
=== Writing ===
In addition to short stories for children and adults, Arndís has published:

- Játningar mjólkurfernuskálds (Reykjavík: Mál og menning, 2011)
- Lyginni líkast (Kópavogur: Námsgagnastofnun, 2013)
- Sitthvað á sveimi: lestrarbók (Kópavogur: Námsgagnastofnun, 2014)
- Gleraugun hans Góa (Kópavogur: Námsgagnastofnun, 2015)
- Nærbuxnaverksmiðjan (Reykjavík: Mál og menning, 2018), ISBN 9789979339465
- Nærbuxnanjósnararnir (Reykjavík: Mál og menning, 2019)
- and Hulda Sigrún Bjarnadóttir, Blokkin á heimsenda (Reykjavík: Mál og menning, 2020)
- Bál tímans: Örlagasaga Möðruvallabókar í sjö hundruð ár (The Inferno of Time: The Adventures of a Vellum Manuscript over 700 Years) (Reykjavík: Forlagið, 2021). Illustrated by Sigmundur Breiðfjörð Þorgeirsson.
- Kollhnís (Somersault) (Reykjavík: Forlagið, 2022)

=== Translating ===
- Bjólfskviða: Forynjurnar og fræðimennirnir [translation of J. R. R. Tolkien 'Beowulf: The Monsters and the Critics'] (Reykjavík: Hið íslenzka bókmenntafélag, 2013)
- Rosie Banks's Secret Kingdom series of children's books (Reykjavík: JPV).

=== Editing ===
- Örþrasir: ljóðakver Listafélagsins, ed. by Arndís Þórarinsdóttir, Vésteinn Valgarðsson, and Haukur Þorgeirsson ([Reykjavík: Skólafélagið], [1999])

== See also ==
- List of Icelandic writers
- Icelandic literature
