= Hrafnaspark =

Novel by Eysteinn Björnsson

Hrafnaspark is a short Icelandic young adults' novel by Eysteinn Björnsson. Its title is a pun: hrafnaspark means 'scrawl', but literally means 'ravens' kick', while the main character is called Hrafn, whose own name means 'raven'. It was voted one of Árborg library's most popular children's books in 2011.

== Plot summary ==
Hrafn gets into an argument with a history teacher at school over the legitimacy of Western imperialism, specifically in relation to the Vietnam War and Iraq War. Appalled at his teacher's right-wing views and callous treatment of Hrafn, Hrafn and a friend break into the school at night while high on ecstasy and vandalise the history classroom (particularly by writing on the walls, hence the novel's title). They are caught and Hrafn is suspended from school. He is unwilling to talk to his parents so his left-leaning grandfather invites him to come out and stay at his cottage in the country. Hrafn agrees. While there, Hrafn goes out for a walk, injures himself, and is rescued by his grandfather; both nearly die of exposure. On their safe return home and recovery, Hrafn's grandfather reminisces about his own youthful misadventures and helps Hrafn arrive at a philosophical position on his left-wing resistance. Hrafn decides to return to school; the novel closes with the characters admiring the Northern Lights.

== Criticism ==
The novel's sympathetic account of Hrafn's left-wing views and rage at society has been read as a response to the 2008–2011 Icelandic financial crisis.
