= Menntaskólinn við Hamrahlíð =

Coordinates: 64°07′50″N 21°54′19″W

Location
- Hamrahlíð 10; Reykjavík, Capital region, 105; Iceland

Information
- School type: Gymnasium, Public
- Established: 1966
- Rector: Helga Jóhannsdóttir
- Staff: 130
- Gender: Mixed
- Age range: 16-21
- Enrollment: 1,200
- Education system: Credit-based
- Language: Icelandic, English
- Campus size: ca. 30,000 square metres (320,000 sq ft)
- Campus type: Urban
- Student Union/Association: NFMH
- Mascot: Miðgarðsormurinn
- Nickname: MH
- Rival: Kvennaskólinn í Reykjavík
- National ranking: 2nd (2012)
- Publication: Beneventum
- Affiliation: International Baccalaureate Organization
- Website: http://www.mh.is/

Menntaskólinn við Hamrahlíð (English: Hamrahlíð College, and usually referred to as MH) is a public gymnasium located in Hlíðahverfi, Reykjavík, Iceland. The school was founded in 1966 by the Icelandic Ministry of Education; with the first graduation occurring in 1970. The school's first rector was Guðmundur Arnlaugsson.

The school's objective is to prepare students for rigorous tertiary studies both locally and in an international environment. It offers four Icelandic-taught programmes leading to the Stúdentspróf qualification: languages, natural sciences, social sciences and performance dance; as well as the English-taught International Baccalaureate programme leading to the IB Diploma. The newest addition is an "independent programme" which allows slightly more room for mixing the other ones together. The school also offers evening classes for older students and coordinates annual language tests for foreign students who wish to apply to local schools.

Since foundation, the school was meant to be a pioneer project, and has therefore received relative freedom in advancing its education policy. It was the first in the country to adopt a university-style credit system, which was soon replicated by several other schools and eventually became the basis for all government-regulated upper secondary curricula.

MH is one of the most selective upper secondary schools in the country. It prides itself for its services to students with disabilities and students whose mother tongue is not Icelandic, who also enjoy priority in the selection process.

Some famous Icelanders that once attended MH include Björk, Paul Oscar and Jón Gnarr, the former mayor of Reykjavík.

== Building ==
Menntaskólinn við Hamrahlíð at night time.

The building that houses MH was built during the Cold War and was therefore also designed to be an emergency shelter and a civic emergency center during a crisis situation. When the volcano Eldfell erupted on 23 January 1973, the school was used to house more than a thousand displaced residents from the Westman Islands, yet the school continued to carry on educational operation through the entire crisis.

Functionally the school is divided into six different areas, each with its own name. The areas are:

=== Matgarður ===
Matgarður is the school's central dining and leisure area, serving more than 600 students a day. A large amount of lunch tables occupy Matgarður, enough for around 350 to 400 students to be seated. The cafeteria is known as Sómalía, and often, during lunch breaks, the members of NFMH announce upcoming school activities. Many famous bands and artists have played in MH, including Booka Shade, Damien Rice, Rage Against the Machine, Swans, Mínus, Ampop, Raein, Kid Carpet and many more. Once a year Matgarður is blessed with holy water that priest Pálmi Matthíasson blessed.

=== Miðgarður ===
Miðgarður (named after the realm of men in Norse mythology) is on the second floor and has seats and tables for around 200–300 students. It also houses a large percentage of the school's computers. The biggest landmark in Miðgarður is undoubtedly Miðgarðsormurinn, a large knitted serpent named for the one who circles Miðgarður in Norse mythology. It has been in creation for many years and is now about 200 metres long.

=== Mikligarður ===
Mikligarður is the school's grand hall, used for graduation, debating competitions (Morfís), choir practices and acting classes.

=== Norðurkjallari ===
Norðurkjallari (Northern Cellar) is one of the student lounges which also serves as the main social venue for various events. Norðurkjallari houses the meeting room of the students body council, archives office, and the photographers' dark room. It is also the only place in the school that does not have a wireless network connection, the theory being that students do not study there, the connection would not be used for academic purposes, and therefore it is not justifiable.

Norðurkjallari is divided into different areas, all given historical names. The main entrance hall is called Sómalía, where students are able to buy soft drinks and coffee. This area leads into Texas and Undirheimar, a corridor which leads to Himnaríki (Heaven), Mararþaraborg, Nemó and Atlantis. Further inside, Bessastaðir's entrance hides behind a sofa along with the mysterious always-locked door to MH's Undirheimar.

=== Undirheimar ===
Undirheimar ("the Underworld") is a place hidden beneath Miðgarður and has been shrouded in mystery for many years. Formerly used as a concert space and student lounge, with a full-size Viking ship on the south wall, because of the low ceiling and lack of proper fire exits. Undirheimar are now used for the acting committee, they have acting practises and shows there. The locked doors to Undirheimar can be found in Norðurkjallari, next to Bessastaðir, and next to the yellow lockers beneath Miðgarður's north staircase.

=== Útgarður ===
Finally, Útgarður is a natural haven located in the central section of the school building. This garden often serves as a venue for courses doing outdoor experiments. It also creates a soothing backdrop for the classrooms surrounding the area; indeed, one entire wall of Miðgarður is a window into the world of Útgarður.

=== Gym ===
The students' gym was finally finished in 2006 and is located in the new building. It has three separate areas: a gym hall, a fitness center and a multi-purpose room (used for various things like ballet, yoga, etc.)

=== Library ===
The library was also finished in 2006, and is located on the 2nd floor of the new building. It is currently the largest school library in Iceland, containing around 12.000 books.

== Education ==
The school was based on the traditional class system from 1966 to 1972, when a credit based system was adopted, which allowed students to choose their own courses and earn credits towards graduation. Each course awards credits relative to its difficulty, with students averaging 30–35 credits per semester. Graduation requires 205 credits, so it typically takes three years to complete the entire program of study. The credit system has advantages: it gives students more control over their schedule and the order in which they take their courses. MH was the first school to offer evening classes catering to older students, and is the only school in Iceland to offer students the International Baccalaureate (IB) diploma program, which is a two- to three-year intensive program taught in English.

MH is known for its amount of different and versatile subjects. It is thought to be the most diverse gymnasium in Iceland in terms of education. Languages available to learn include Icelandic, English, Sign language, Japanese, Danish, Norwegian, Swedish, German, Spanish, French, Italian, Russian, Polish, Latin and recently Chinese

== Student union ==
MH's social life is mostly the responsibility of the Nemendafélag Menntaskólans við Hamrahlíð ("MH Student Association", usually abbreviated NFMH). The NFMH is one of the largest and most active student associations in Iceland, including various smaller internal clubs and leagues with specific roles and agendas, commonly known as Stórfélagið ("the great alliance"). NFMH is also the publisher of the newspaper Fréttapési, which is known for its crude humor and lack of morality. In 2006 Fréttapési was a subject in the news magazine Kastljós because of their article "10 songs to rape to", which caused a public outrage in Iceland.

== Choir ==
The school choir, Kór Menntaskólans við Hamrahlíð, was founded by Þorgerður Ingólfsdóttir, in cooperation with the rector, Guðmundur Arnlaugsson, in 1967, a year after the school's opening. Students who are members of the choir normally leave the choir upon graduation, but many alumni join Hamrahlíðarkórinn, also conducted by Þorgerður Ingólfsdóttir. Hamrahlíðarkórinn was established in 1982 by members of the school choir who wanted to continue to work and perform with Þorgerður after graduating from MH.

=== Mararþaraborg ===
Mararþaraborg is a small store run by members of the choir. The store's revenues are used to fund various choir activities. The store is named after the Icelandic title of a children's book by Ingebrigt Davik called Æfintýri í Mararþaraborg, or Det hende i Taremareby in the original Norwegian.

== Newspapers ==
The student association (NFMH) publishes two student papers, Beneventum and the gossip oriented Fréttapési. The later has received heavy criticism through the years for harassing students and promoting sexualised freshmen competitions.
