= International Facility for Food Irradiation Technology =

Research and training centre in the Netherlands

The International Facility for Food Irradiation Technology (IFFIT) was a research and training centre at the Institute of Atomic Research in Agriculture in Wageningen, Netherlands, sponsored by the Food and Agriculture Organization (FAO) of the United Nations, the International Atomic Energy Agency (IAEA) and the Dutch Ministry of Agriculture and Fisheries.

== Aims ==
The organisation's aim was to address food loss and food safety in developing countries by speeding up the practical introduction of the food irradiation process. They achieved this by training initiatives, research and feasibility studies.

It was founded in 1978 and was operational until 1990, and during those twelve years over four hundred key personnel from over fifty countries were trained in aspects of food irradiation, making a significant contribution to the development and use of the radiation process. The Facility also co-ordinated research into the technology, economics and implementation of food irradiation, assisted in the assessment of the feasibility of using radiation to preserve foodstuffs, and evaluated trial shipments of irradiated material.

== Facilities ==
The Facility had a pilot plant with a cobalt-60 source whose activity was 100,000 curies (3,700 TBq), which was stored underwater. Drums or boxes containing products were placed on rotating tables or conveyor belts, and irradiation took place by raising the source out of the pool.

== Details ==
During IFFIT's first five years of operation, 109 scientists from 40 countries attended six training courses, five of them being general training courses on food irradiation and the sixth being a specialised course on public health aspects. IFFIT also evaluated shipments of irradiated mangoes, spices, avocado, shrimp, onions and garlic, and produced 46 reports. The publications are available on WorldCat.

One trainee noted that Professor D. A. A. Mossel (1918–2004) assisted with the training courses with what he described as "remarkably suggestive lectures and his phenomenal foreign language abilities". From 1988 onwards, Ari Brynjolfsson was director of IFFIT.
