= Verzló =

Coordinates: 64°07′40″N 21°53′47″W

Verzlunarskóli Íslands

Location
- Ofanleiti 1 Reykjavík 103; Iceland

Information
- School type: Private school
- Established: 1905
- Principal: Guðrún Inga Sívertsen
- Gender: Mixed
- Age range: 16-19
- Hours in school day: 8
- Slogan: Hæfni, ábyrgð, virðing og vellíðan
- Song: Kepp ötul fram & Viva Verzló
- Nickname: Verzló
- Rival: Menntaskólinn í Reykjavík
- Newspaper: Viljinn
- Yearbook: Verzlunarskólablaðið
- Tuition: 197.000kr a year
- Graduates: Approximately 400 per year
- Website: https://www.verslo.is/english/

Verzlunarskóli Íslands, usually referred to as Verzló (official name in English: Commercial College of Iceland), is an Icelandic gymnasium. It was founded in 1905 and is the oldest private school in Iceland. The school is located in Reykjavík and has more than 900 students.

The gymnasium serves the whole of Iceland and has a student population of just below one thousand. It is organized on the basis of a form system, with all students in the same form having the same timetable. Students are in school full-time from 8:15 to 15:40, Monday to Friday.

The school year consists of two semesters: fall and spring. Each semester, students take a full-time load of courses worth five or six credits each. Over three years, they take a total of 140+ credits and matriculate with an Icelandic stúdentspróf which is the standard prerequisite for university admission in Iceland.

In their first year, all students follow a common curriculum. They then opt to specialise in one of four streams: business, science, social science and languages or arts.

During the remaining two years of their three-year programme, the students complete their stúdentspróf.

== History ==
Verzló was founded in 1905 by the Store and Office Workers' Union and the Retailers' Association in Reykjavik. Since 1922, it has operated under the aegis of the Iceland Chamber of Commerce. The original objective was to give young people the opportunity of a basic commercial education. In 1996, the course offering was revised, leading to a reorganization of the streaming system and an increase in the number of courses offered. The revised streaming system was implemented in the fall of 1997.

Verzló is a non-profit organization operating under Charter No. 272/ 15 June 1993. According to this charter, the main objectives of the college are to promote the competitiveness of Icelandic industry, both internally and internationally, by providing and furthering education in general and business education at secondary and tertiary levels in particular.

== Notable alumni ==
- Björgólfur Thor Björgólfsson, businessman, Iceland's first billionaire (in USD).
- Áslaug Arna Sigurbjörnsdóttir, member of parliament and minister of justice.
- Björgólfur Guðmundsson, businessman, Iceland's second billionaire (in USD).
- Gísli Marteinn Baldursson, former politician and TV programmer.
- Halla Tómasdóttir, President of Iceland.
- Selma Björnsdóttir, singer and actress.
- Jóhanna Sigurðardóttir, former Prime Minister of Iceland.
- Þorsteinn Pálsson, former Prime Minister of Iceland.
- Jón Ásgeir Jóhannesson, businessman, co-founder of Bónus and former CEO of Baugur Group.
- Rán Ísold Eysteinsdóttir, an actress known for her role in the TV series Trapped.
