= Ari Brynjolfsson =

Icelandic-American physicist

- Born: December 7, 1926; Akureyri, Iceland
- Died: June 28, 2013 (aged 85); Tampa, Florida, U.S.
- Education: University of Copenhagen; Harvard Business School
- Occupation: Physicist
- Scientific career
- Workplaces: Risø Laboratoy; US Army Radiation Facilities

Ari Brynjolfsson (December 7, 1926 – June 28, 2013; Icelandic spelling Brynjólfsson) was an Icelandic-American nuclear physicist known for his work in America on food irradiation and for the development of radiation facilities for improving food safety.

== Education and career ==
Brynjolfsson was born in Akureyri, Iceland, as one of the seven children of Brynjólfur Sigtryggsson and Guðrún Rósinkarsdóttir from Hörgárdalur. He lived in Krossanes, Eyjafjörður and graduated from Menntaskólinn á Akureyri in 1948, then studied nuclear physics at the Niels Bohr Institute, University of Copenhagen, Denmark, from 1948 to 1954, gaining his PhD, with a thesis which dealt with a device he had constructed for accurately measuring magnetism in rocks. Following this he became a special research fellow of the University of Iceland from 1954 to 1955, then an Alexander von Humboldt fellow of the University of Göttingen, Germany, from 1955 to 1957. While at Göttingen he contributed important work in magnetic moments, using a self-devised instrument with which he and others provided the strongest evidence to that date for magnetic field reversals.

He became Head of Radiation Facilities for the Danish government at Risø Laboratoy (1957–1965) and then Head of US Army Radiation Facilities, Natick, Massachusetts (1965–1980). He graduated from the advanced management program at the Harvard Business School in 1971. He also served as the Director of IFFIT (International Facility for Food Irradiation Technology) of the Joint FAO/IAEA, United Nations (1988–1992). He gained his DSc in 1973 with a thesis entitled Some Aspects of the Interactions of Fast Charged Particles with Matter which led to his work on plasma redshift.

Later in his life, he published several articles on his results for the reverse plasma redshift of photons in a gravitational field, which led him to investigate and develop his own theory within Plasma cosmology. In 2004 he also co-signed a letter published on New Scientist addressing the lack of funds and attention for theories alternative to Big Bang cosmology.

Many of his publications and much of his work centered around food irradiation and the development of radiation facilities around the world. He received several awards including the Møller Foundation Award for exceptional service to Danish Industry, 1965 "Radiation Science and Technology Award of the American Nuclear Society", 1988 and was noted award recipient from U.S. Brigadier General Merrill L. Tribe in 1963.

He died at the age of 86 in Tampa, FL on 28 June 2013, leaving a widow, five children and nineteen grandchildren.
