= Ólína Þorvarðardóttir =

Writer,scholar, journalist and politician from Iceland

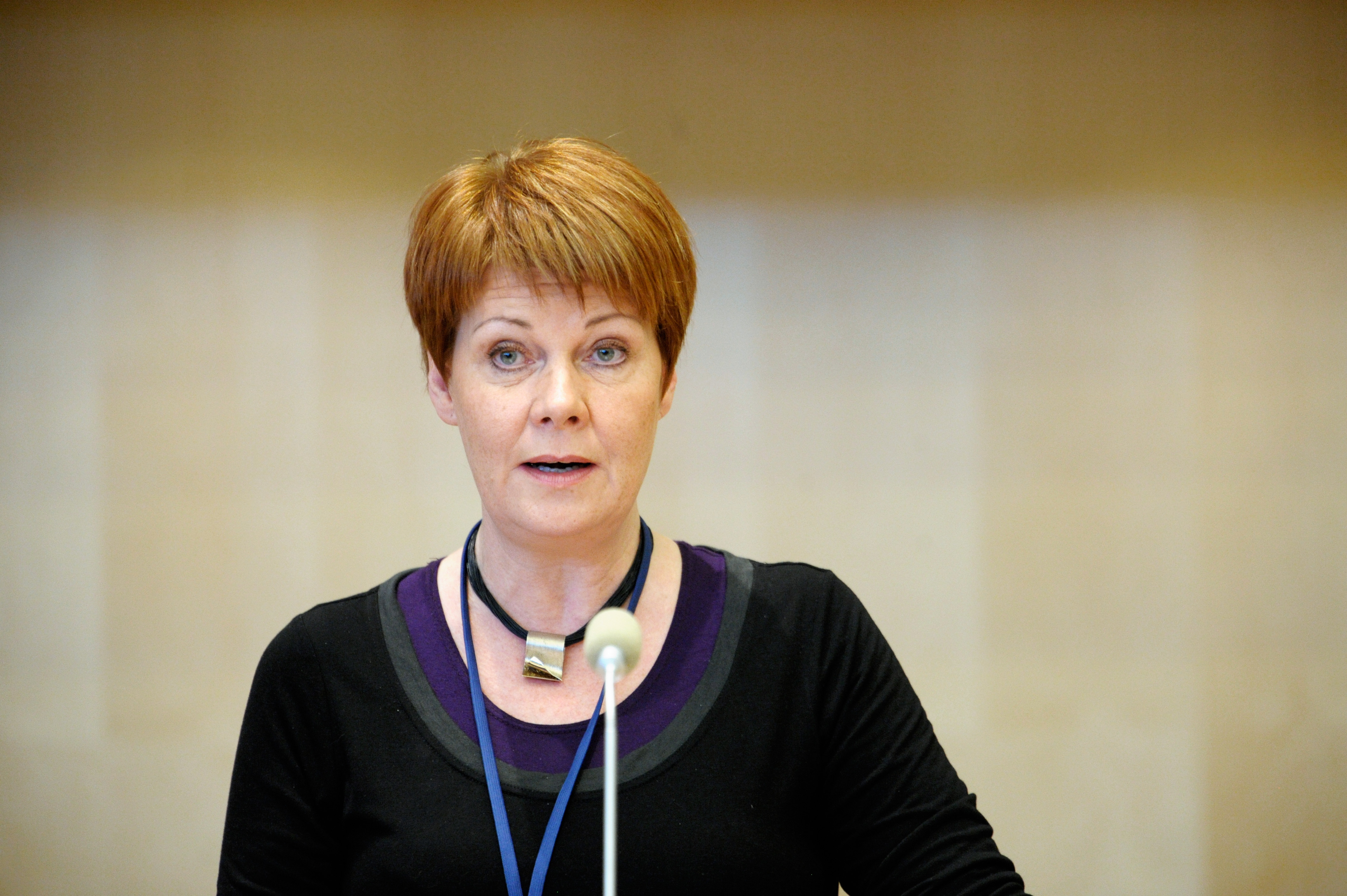

Personal details
- Born: 8 September 1958 (age 67) Reykjavík, Iceland
- Party: Social Democratic Alliance
- Spouse: Sigurður Pétursson
- Children: 3 sons, 2 daughters

Ólína Kjerúlf Þorvarðardóttir (born 8 September 1958) is an Icelandic writer, scholar and former journalist and politician. She was a member of the Althing from 2009 to 2016, representing the Social Democratic Alliance for the Northwest Constituency.

== Life and career ==
Ólína was born in Reykjavík but moved to Ísafjörður at the age of 14 when her father was hired as the local District Commissioner. She studied at Menntaskólinn á Ísafirði where she met her future husband, Sigurður Pétursson with whom she has had five children.

Ólína has been an active scholar in social Sciences, Icelandic literature and folklore. Since 2022 she has been a dean and a professor at Bifröst University in Iceland. Before that she was member of the Icelandic Parliament Alþingi Íslendinga 2009-2016 where she was chairman of the parliamentary committees on industry, the environment and transport. Ólína was a principal of the Junior College of Ísafjörður (Menntaskólinn á Ísafirði) from 2001 to 2006; and lecturer at the University of Iceland (Folklore, Icelandic literature) from 1992 to 2000. Before participating in politics, Ólína worked as a journalist, reporter and TV-anchor at the State Broadcasting Station (RÚV) from 1987 to 1990.

She has published several books and articles on political and social matters as well as Icelandic folklore and literature. Her docotoral thesis Brennuöldin. Galdur og galdratrú í málskjölum og munnmælum (Háskólaútgáfan 2000, second edition Forlagið 2023) is about the witch persecutions in 17th century Iceland.

=== Parliamentary Committees ===
- Member of the Committee on the Environment (2009–2016; also chairman 2010–2016).
- Vice-chairman of the Committee on Fisheries and Agriculture (2009–2016; also vice-chairman 2009–2016).
- Member of the Committee on Transport and Communications (2010–2016).
- Chairman of the Icelandic delegation to the West Nordic Council (2009–2016).
- Chairman of The West Nordic Council (2010–2016).
- Member of the Committee on Social Affairs and Social Security (2009–2010).

=== SAR ===
Ólína is a volunteer member of the Icelandic Association for Search and Rescue (ICE-SAR)] where she specializes in training and working with rescue dogs. In January 2020, she was part of a team of around 200 SAR members who rescued 49 people at the base of Langjökull glacier.

== Published books ==
2025	Glæður galdrabáls: Sannsaga frá 17. öld. (Folklore/Science)
2021	Ilmreyr. Móðurminning. (Biography/Science)
2020	Spegill fyrir skuggabaldur. Atvinnubann og misbeiting valds. (Social science)
2019	Lífgrös og leyndir dómar. Lækningar, töfrar og trú í sögulegu ljósi. (Folk medicine - Science)
2017	Við Djúpið blátt. Ísafjarðardjúp. (Yearbook of the Icelandic Touring Association)
2009	Vestanvindur. Ljóð og lausir endar. (Poetry)
2000	Brennuöldin. Galdur og galdratrú í málskjölum og munnmælum. (Folklore/Literature/History. Science)
1995	Álfar og tröll. Íslensk þjóðfræði. (Folklore. Science)
1988	Bryndís. Lífssaga Bryndísar Schram. (Biography)
