= Morfís =

Icelandic elocution and debate competition

Established	1984
Competition type:	Debating
Location	Reykjavík, Iceland

The college elocution and debate competition of Iceland, in short MORFÍs. Contestants in MORFÍs are known to become celebrities in the Icelandic community. MORFÍs was founded in 1983 by debating clubs of the schools and Junior Chambers. From 1985 it has been run only by students in the gymnasiums of Iceland.

It is one of the three major contests (the others being a singing contest and a knowledge contest) Icelandic gymnasiums hold, but the only one which is not supported and financed by the national television station. This has caused protest and disgruntlement by many students involved in MORFÍs.

The title in full is "Mælsku- og rökræðukeppni framhaldsskóla Íslands" (MORFÍs) which translates directly as "The speech and debate competition of high schools/colleges in Iceland".

Many participants in MORFÍs have later on become nationally known, for example in television and at the Icelandic parliament Alþingi. Whether this is because of, or rooted in the same personality traits, as their involvement in the contest, is uncertain.
