= Tækniskólinn =

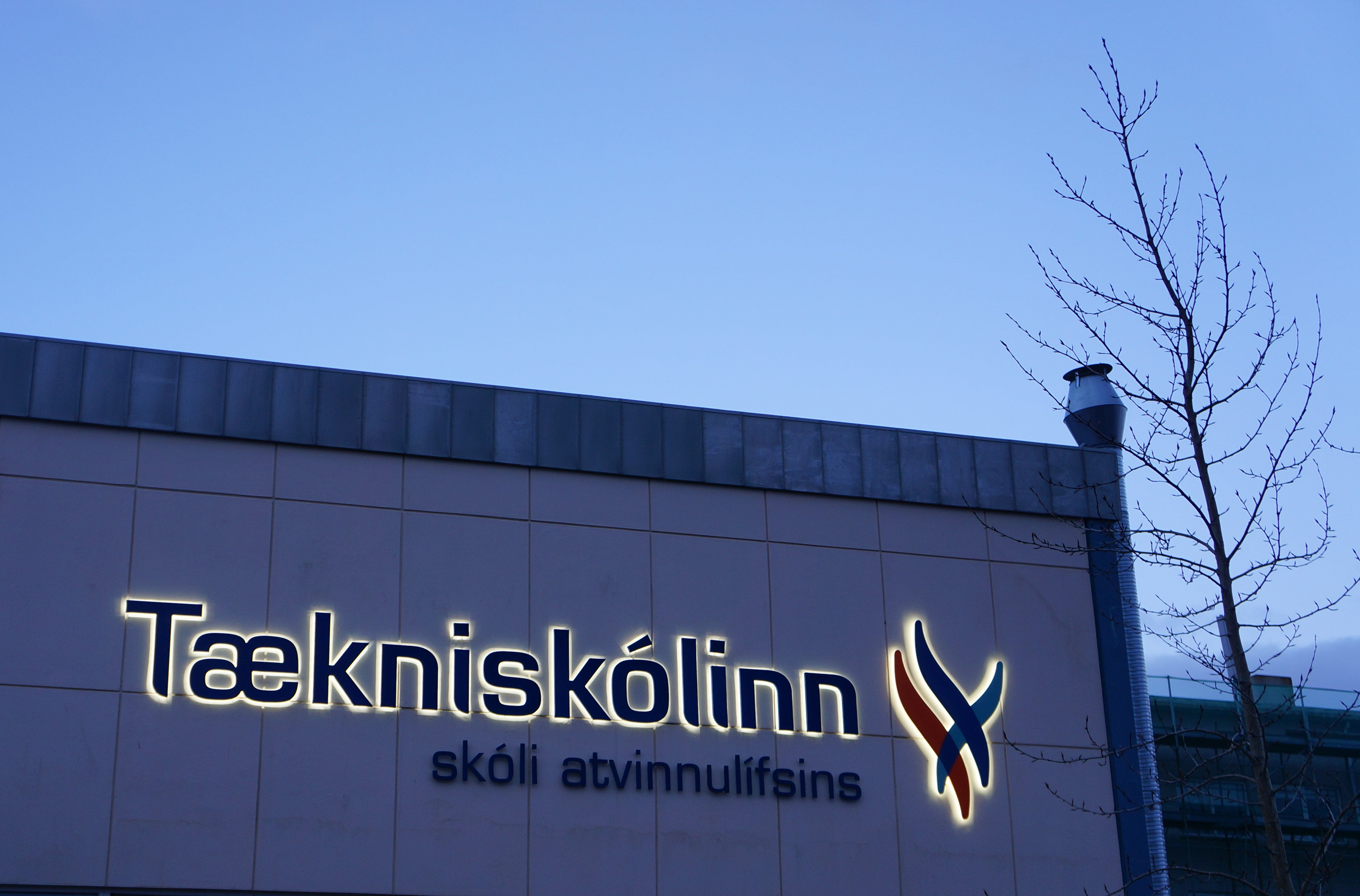
- Offices of the Tækniskólinn in Reykjavík

Location
- Skólavörðuholt; Capital Region; Reykjavík 101; Iceland
- Coordinates: 64°08′32″N 21°55′30″W

Information
- School type: Vocational, Private
- Founded: 2008
- Age range: 16+
- Website: tskoli.is

Tækniskólinn (lit. Technical College) is an upper secondary school in Reykjavík, Iceland, providing both vocational and specialized programmes. It was formed in 2008 through the merger of its two predecessors: Iðnskólinn í Reykjavík and Fjöltækniskólinn. It is subdivided into 13 trade-specific schools, which collectively make up one of the largest schools in the country.

These schools are located at Skólavörðuholt, 101 Reykjavík:

- School of Building and Construction Trades
- School of Design and Handicraft
- School of Electrical Technology
- School of General Academic Studies and Design
- School of Handicraft - Hair, Gold and Clothes
- School of Continuing Education

Located at Háteigsvegur, 105 Reykjavík:

- School of Information Technology
- School of Engine Technology
- School of Navigation
- Reykjavik Academy of Technology

The school is owned by the following Icelandic business organizations:

- The Federation of Icelandic Fishing Vessel Owners
- The Federation of Icelandic Industries
- Samorka – Icelandic Energy & Utilities
- The Icelandic Shipowners' Association
