= Menntaskólinn í Reykjavík =

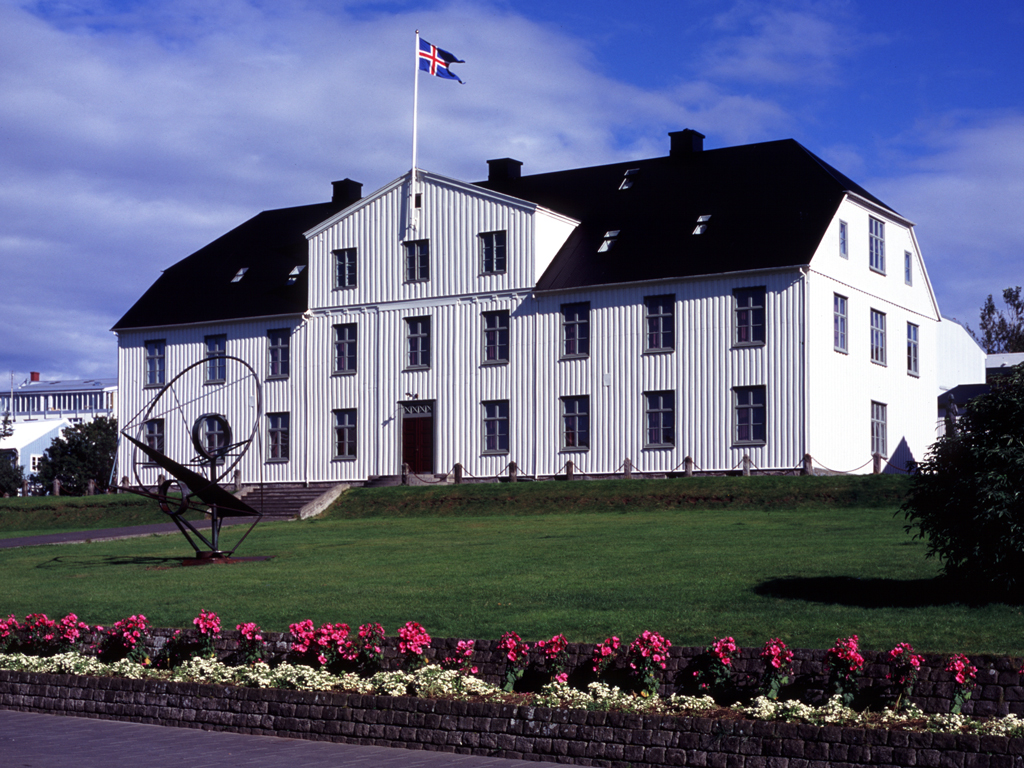
- The main building of Menntaskólinn í Reykjavík

Location
- Lækjargata 7 Reykjavík, Miðbær; Iceland
- 64.1460°N 21.9368°W

Information
- School type: junior college
- Established: 1056
- Headmistress: Sólveig Guðrún Hannesdóttir
- Gender: Mixed
- Age range: Around 15–19
- Classrooms: 40
- Song: Faðir andanna & Gaudeamus igitur
- Nickname: MR
- Rival: Verzlunarskóli Íslands
- National ranking: 1st (2012)
- Nobel laureates: 2
- Website: mr.is

Menntaskólinn í Reykjavík (MR; official name in English: Reykjavik College) is an upper secondary school in Iceland. It is located in Reykjavík.

The school traces its origin to 1056, when a school was established in Skálholt, and it remains one of the oldest institutions in Iceland. The school was moved to Reykjavík in 1786, but poor housing conditions forced it to move again in 1805 to Bessastaðir near Reykjavík. In 1846 the school was moved to its current location, and a new building was erected for it in Reykjavík. This was the largest building in the country at the time and can be seen on the 500 Icelandic krona bill. It was used initially when Althing began to meet again in Reykjavík after a few years hiatus and thus it is in this building where Icelandic independence leader Jón Sigurðsson led the MPs in their famous phrase, Vér mótmælum allir.

The school has previously been known as Lærði skólinn (The Learned School), Latínuskólinn (The Latin School) and by the Latin title Schola Reykjavicensis; it received its present name in 1937.

Menntaskólinn í Reykjavík offers a three-year course of study. It usually ends with a diploma (stúdentspróf) which gives the graduating student the right to advance to an Icelandic university.

Many Icelandic politicians, including the first prime minister Hannes Hafstein, former prime minister Davíð Oddsson, former president of Iceland, Ólafur Ragnar Grímsson and former president, Guðni Th. Jóhannesson all attended MR. Almost every prime minister of Iceland has been educated at the school apart from Halldór Ásgrímsson, Ólafur Jóhannesson, Sigurður Ingi Jóhannsson, Þorsteinn Pálsson, Jóhanna Sigurðardóttir and Katrín Jakobsdóttir. Geir H. Haarde, Davíð's successor as chairman of the Independence Party and former prime minister, also took over from him as chairman of student body, Skólafélagið (inspector scholae). In 1879 Hannes Hafstein was the school's first inspector scholae, and in 1940 his grandson Einar Ragnarsson Kvaran achieved the position. The former President of Iceland, Ólafur Ragnar Grímsson, was also the president of the main student body, Framtíðin.

== Culture and traditions ==
School traditions include a hall fight and the singing of the Brevitate Vitae. Six dances are held every year, including the costume-ball and the freshman-ball. Many clubs have been founded in MR, these include: An Art club (with five divisions for: Visual art, music, dancing, literature and films), Herranótt acting guild (the oldest theatric club in northern Europe), Computer academy and a Nerd club (which merged and became known as The Academy), Traveller's club, Sport's club, Riding club, Science club, Novelist club, Chess club and the Rowing club (which was historically a club for rowing, but is now a male/female-cheerleading team).

=== The Hall Fight ===
Every year at the end of spring semester the students of MR organize a fight in the halls of the main building. A bell is placed on the ground floor of the building and the seniors aim to reach that bell and ring it while other students try to fight them and prevent them from doing so. Should the seniors succeed in their task, the younger students are to attend next class. During the fight, some or all senior students are covered in dirt. This event was cancelled permanently after the 2008-2009 Inspector Platearum (a senior student who is responsible for ringing the school bells and is furthermore the leader of the seniors in the Hall Fight) broke his neck in the fight, resulting in a 9 million ISK lawsuit.

=== The Freshmen Day ===
One day in the first weeks of school is a special day for newcomers (Icelandic: busadagur), this day is held in all junior colleges in the country and is not only the tradition of Menntaskólinn í Reykjavík, although the traditions regarding this day vary greatly between schools. The day starts with the seniors dressing up in white toga cloaks and painting their faces. The seniors then march around the school and gather the newcomers out to the school grounds where they are then thrown high into the air. The tradition of throwing newcomers into the air is old - but the part of dressing up in toga was added by seniors in 1991 (graduating in 1992). On this day (and the next few days after) students tend to sing the song "De Brevitate Vitae." The following night a freshman ball is held.

=== The Violin Dance (Fiðluballið) ===
The violin dance is by many described as a fancy promenade ball where live violin music is played and students wear their best garments while dancing elegantly. The tradition was started in the 1960s and was meant to be an iconoclasm to the hippie culture at the time. Reverend Geir Waage is rumored to have been the originator of the dance. It was only held once, although in 1992 it was resurrected by Dagur B. Eggertsson, inspector scholae. It is now an annual event for graduating students.

=== Publications ===
The two student bodies maintain a number of periodic publications. Amongst them are:

- Skólablaðið Skinfaxi - Articles about the past year; published annually. Contains two publications, Skólablaðið and Skinfaxi, respectably, which have been published jointly since 2009. Skinfaxi was first published in 1898 and Skólablaðið in 1925.
- Loki Laufeyjarson - A similar publication to Menntaskólatíðindi, but published by Framtíðin, the student body.
- Menntaskólatíðindi - A newspaper about daily life and events in the school; published roughly once every month by the new student body Skólafélagið.
- De Rerum Natura - A scientific magazine published by the science club every year. Named after Lucretius' De Rerum Natura. It was first published in 1960, under the presidency of Ólafur Ragnar Grímsson, who later became president of Iceland.
- Yggdrasill and The Novelist News - Two magazines published by the Novelist Club every year.
- Vetur - An annual photographic newspaper with pictures of students, daily life, and social life in MR.
- Businn - A monthly newspaper for freshmen, written by juniors for juniors.
- Idus Martii - An annual magazine about history, ancient languages and classics. Published by 2nd year students of the classical language department on the Ides of March.
- Morkinskinna - Published annually in the beginning of autumn. A handbook containing information about the school and its students and a study diary. Named after Morkinskinna.

=== Debating ===
Framtíðin, the oldest student body in Iceland, is a member of Mælsku- og rökræðukeppni framhaldsskóla á Íslandi (MorfÍs, The Icelandic Junior College Debating Society), which holds an annual debating competition between Icelandic junior colleges. Since its foundation in 1983, MR has won the finals eight times. The students of MR regularly hold debating competitions among themselves. These competitions are held very often and a lot of traditions have evolved around them. "Framtíðin" administers the debating society for MR students and it is also one of the oldest clubs in Iceland (founded in 1883). Sólbjartur is an annual debating competition in which each class of MR is free to send one or more teams to debate. The winning team receives the title "Sólbjartur" (Literally: Sun-bright) and the best debater of the winning team receives the title "Orator Scholae" (Latin: Spokesman of the school). Another annual competition is held, called "Orator Minor" (Latin: The next-best spokesman). Orator Minor is a competition where people debate about randomly selected subjects in one-on-one battles and only have ten minutes to prepare their speeches. However, Orator Minor, from the year 2007, is held more than once every year, even up to five times.

=== Quizzing ===
MR has been the most successful school on RÚV's academic quiz competition Gettu betur; it has been champion in 23 series of the programme, with its most recent occurring in 2023. This included an 11-year winning streak from 1993 to 2003. An annual quiz competition is held, for which each class sends in one or more teams to compete against others. This competition is called "Ratatoskur", named after the famous squirrel from Nordic mythology.

=== MR-ví ===
One day in October each year, the students of MR and its rival school, Verzlunarskóli Íslands (Commercial College of Iceland) or "Verzlo" as it is often referred to as, meet in the "Hljómskálagarður" park, located in downtown Reykjavík, where various games and competitions are held. These include: sprinting, soccer, rowing, giant-chess (later replaced with ordinary chess), screaming, tug-o-war, competitive eating, arm wrestling, car stuffing and the infamous Mexican-run. The night of that day, a debating competition between the two schools is held.

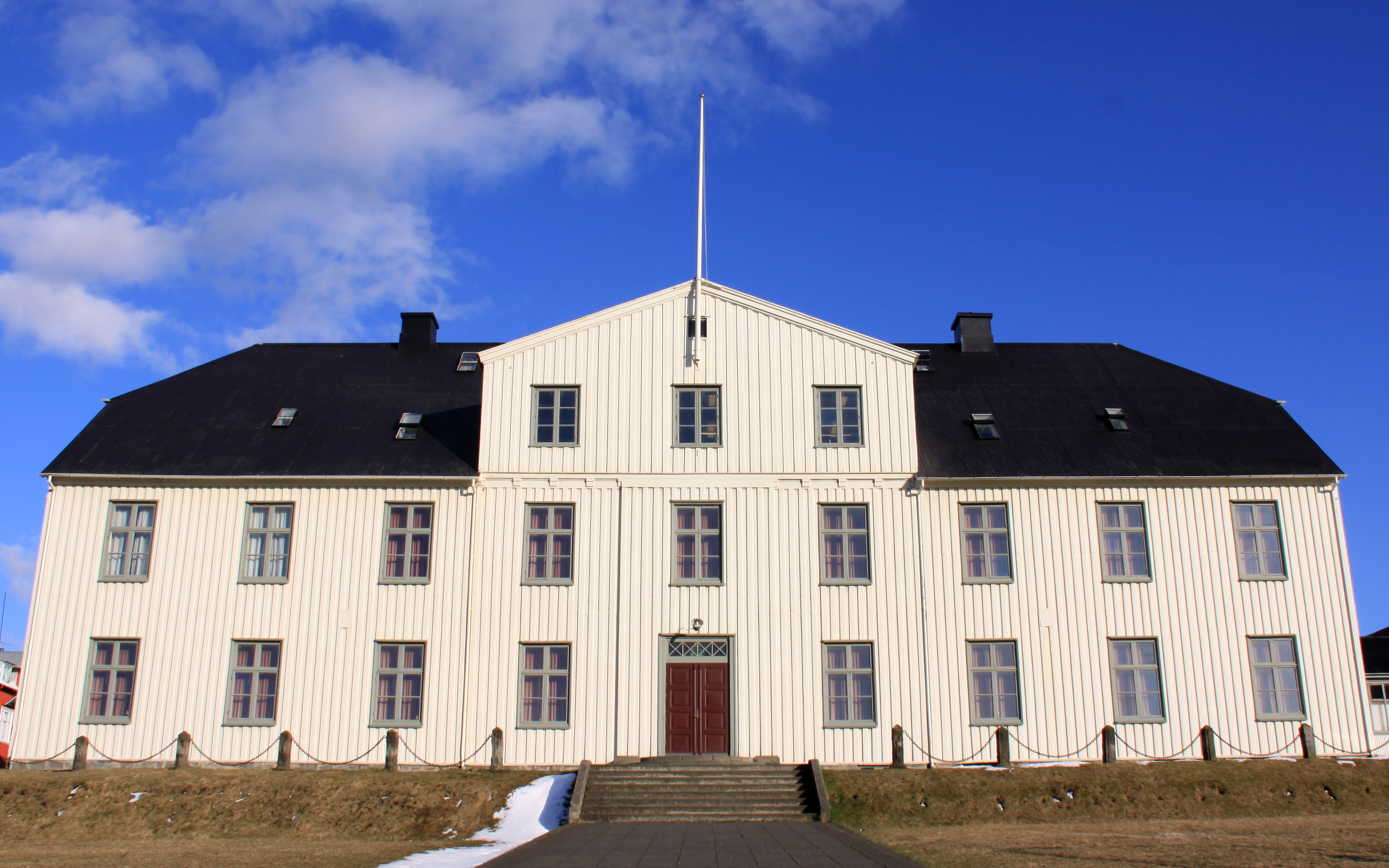
The Menntaskóli in Reykjavik.

== Education ==
MR is renowned for its traditional and classical style of education.

MR offers two separate "paths" which students choose when enrolling in the school. These are a natural science path and a language path. The natural science path is divided into a biology department and a physics department on the second year, while the language path divides into modern language department and a classical language department. MR is the only school in Iceland which teaches mandatory Latin in some form and the only one which teaches Ancient Greek.

In earlier years the school offered a six years course of study before it was shortened into four years. Thus the first year is called "third form", the second year is called "fourth form" and so on. However, in 2016 the school was shortened even more to only three years, with the first three-years graduates graduating May 2019 along with the last round of graduates in the four years system.

== Housing ==
The number of students has grown rapidly since the founding of the school. This has led to the expanding of the school's housing. The flagship and main building of the school is still the front house, Gamli Skóli (literally: The Old School), which was built in 1846. Several houses and additions have been built since. These buildings include:

- Íþaka (Ithaca) is the library and study hall of MR. It was built in 1867 as a gift to Icelanders from Charles Kelsall, a wealthy English merchant. It takes its name from Ithaca, New York, the home of professor Willard Fiske that started a book club at the school. It went under major restorations from 2018 to 2020 where most of its interior was rebuilt. After the restoration, the reading hall and library swapped floors. The library is now located at the ground floor and the reading hall moved to the attic.
- Fjósið (The Cowshed) is a small wooden house with two classrooms. It was originally used to store fire-fighting equipment and later used to house the rector's cows.
- Íþróttahöllin (The Sports-Palace) is the oldest sports hall in Iceland and for a long time it was the biggest one, although it is thought to be very small and outdated by today's standards. In fact it is so small that the basketball penalty boxes overlap.
- Þrælakistan (The Sweatshop) is a very small building connected to the Sports-Palace. It is a small gym and currently contains modern weight-lifting equipment but has historically contained antiquated equipment.
- Casa Christi (Latin: House of Christ) is an old building with several classrooms. It is relatively big compared to other houses in the area. This building was once used by the Reykjavík YMCA, thus the name "Casa Christi". It is thought to be ugly and in bad condition and has been noted by the students and faculty as smelling distinctly of chlorine. The building is due for demolition in the near future for a new and better building to be constructed. A movement within the school has surfaced, demanding a change of name for this building. One suggestion is "Casa Sophiae", (Greek: House of Wisdom), which reflects how the nation is becoming more and more secular.
- Casa Nova (Latin: New House) is a relatively young building and the largest one in the complex. It has many classrooms and is also the center for the students' social gatherings. A comfort lounge and a cafeteria is located in the basement of the building. It was originally built in the 1960s but underwent major restoration in 2006.
- Villa Nova (Latin: New Apartment) is the groundskeeper's shed and a storage room for the school. It also used to house the offices of the student bodies before Amtmannsstígur 2 was taken into service.
- Elísabetarhús (Elizabeth's House) also known as "Minni Elísabetar" (Memoirs of Elizabeth) is the latest addition to the school's housing. It has several classrooms, including some of the most perfect educational laboratories in Iceland. Known as Casa Subuculae before it was fully taken into service. It was a gift from the former owner of the house, whose wife, Elísabet, had recently died.
- Amtmannsstígur 2 is the teachers' lounge. It also houses offices and serves as a meeting place for the student bodies.
- Menntaskólaselið or simply selið, built 1938, is a house little outside of Reykjavík (around 45 minutes), close to the southern town of Hveragerði. It is a rural dwelling used for student trips and vacations. It was used for the first time in ten years in 2011 after having been closed due to its bad state. Since then it has been used extensively by the school's choir, and a geology trip for the freshmen once per year.

== Rectors from 1846 ==
1846-1851: Sveinbjörn Egilsson
1851-1867: Bjarni Jónsson
1867-1872: Jens Sigurðsson
1872-1895: Jón Þorkelsson
1895-1904: Björn M. Ólsen
1904-1913: Steingrímur Thorsteinsson
1913-1928: Geir T. Zoëga
1928-1929: Þorleifur H. Bjarnason
1929-1956: Pálmi Hannesson
1956-1965: Kristinn Ármannsson
1965-1970: Einar Magnússon
1970-1996: Guðni Guðmundsson
1996-2001: Ragnheiður Torfadóttir
2001-2012: Yngvi Pétursson
2012-2013: Linda Rós Michaelsdóttir
2013-2017: Yngvi Pétursson
2017-2022: Elísabet Siemsen
2022-present: Sólveig Guðrún Hannesdóttir
