= Kópavogur College =

Coordinates: 64°06′39″N 21°53′42″W

Kópavogur College Icelandic: Menntaskólinn í Kópavogi

Information
- Established: 1973; 52 years ago
- Website: www.mk.is

Kópavogur College (Icelandic: Menntaskólinn í Kópavogi Icelandic pronunciation: [ˈmɛn̥taˌskouːlɪn i ˈkʰouːpaˌvɔijɪ]) is an upper-secondary school in Kópavogur, Iceland, founded on September 22, 1973.
