= Fjölbrautaskólinn í Breiðholti =

Coordinates: 64°06′21.61″N 21°49′07.42″W

Location
- Austurberg 5, IS-111; Reykjavík; Iceland

Information
- Established: 1975
- Headteacher: Guðrún Hrefna Guðmundsdóttir
- Age: 15+
- Campus size: ~ 26.000 m2
- Slogan: Lykill að framtíðinni
- Website: www.fb.is

Fjölbrautaskólinn í Breiðholti (The polytechnic school in Breiðholt) is an Icelandic higher educational institute and gymnasium.

Founded in 1975, the school currently has a student population of around 2800 people divided between about 1600 students in morning classes, about 500 students in evening classes, and about 700 students in summer school. The school is known for offering multiple educational "paths" which has led to some calling it a rounded collection of schools in the same building. All in all there are 27 paths one can take, including fine arts, cosmetology, nursing, media studies and athletics. The school follows a unit system. While it is possible to graduate specializing in a certain path in one or two years, 140 units are needed to obtain a Matriculation Examination which takes on average about four years. Obtaining a Matriculation Examination is possible from all paths.

== Student life ==
The school's student union (Nemendafélag Fjölbrautaskólans í Breiðholti commonly abbreviated as NFB) is responsible for organizing the school's social life including dances and various other activities.

== Notable alumni ==
- Hafþór Júlíus Björnsson
