= CommonWealth Magazine (Taiwan) =

Taiwanese magazine

- Native name: 天下雜誌
- Categories: News Magazine
- Format: A4
- Publisher: 天下雜誌股份有限公司
- Founder: Yin Yun-peng; Charles Kao; Wang Lixing
- Founded: 1981-06-01
- Country: Taiwan
- Language: Chinese
- Website: www.cw.com.tw
- ISSN: 1015-2784

CommonWealth Magazine (Chinese: 天下雜誌) is a Taiwanese magazine established in 1981, primarily focuses on finance, politics and humanities.

== History ==
CommonWealth Magazine was founded by Yin Yu-peng, Charles Kao, and Wang Lixing in 1981, following the United States' de-recognition of Taiwan and the severance of diplomatic relations. Yin decided to establish a news magazine to address Taiwan's international information deficit. The magazine primarily focuses on finance, with additional coverage of politics, humanities, and environmental protection. It is well known for its annual ranking of the top 2000 Taiwanese enterprises. CommonWealth has generally been regarded as politically neutral, although occasional criticism has emerged regarding a perceived leaning towards the pan-blue coalition in the late 2010s.

In 1986, Yin Yu-peng and Charles Kao had different visions for the company. Yu aimed to concentrate on domestic issues in Taiwan, while Kao intended to expand into the Chinese market. As a result, CommonWealth was divided into three divisions: CommonWealth Magazine, chaired by Yu; Global Views - Commonwealth Publishing Group, led by Kao; and Global Views Monthly, with Wang Lixing as the chief editor. In 2021, on the 40th anniversary of CommonWealth, Yu announced his retirement and appointed six executives, including Wu Yin-Chuen, the current president of the company, to co-lead the organization. The magazine has also received several Golden Tripod awards, including Best Digital Publication and Best Financial and Current Affairs Magazine in the 42nd and 45th Golden Tripods.

== Crossing ==
On 1 June 2015, CommonWealth Magazine established a new division by moving all opinion pieces to a new website Crossing (Chinese: 換日線). Chang Hsiang-yi, an editor at CommonWealth Magazine for nine years, became the chief editor of the new outlet, which had an editorial team of ten. The site targets an international audience, and features regular columns, reader submissions, and interviews focused on topics such as politics, workplace issues, education, and lifestyle. By December 2015, Crossing had published over 500 articles from authors in 50 different cities worldwide, accumulating more than 6 million page views. On 15 September 2016, Crossing released its first physical edition. In September 2021, the outlet introduced a subscription model.
