= Akureyri Junior College =

Coordinates: 65.6765°N 18.0944°W

- Menntaskólinn á Akureyri
- Schola Akureyrensis
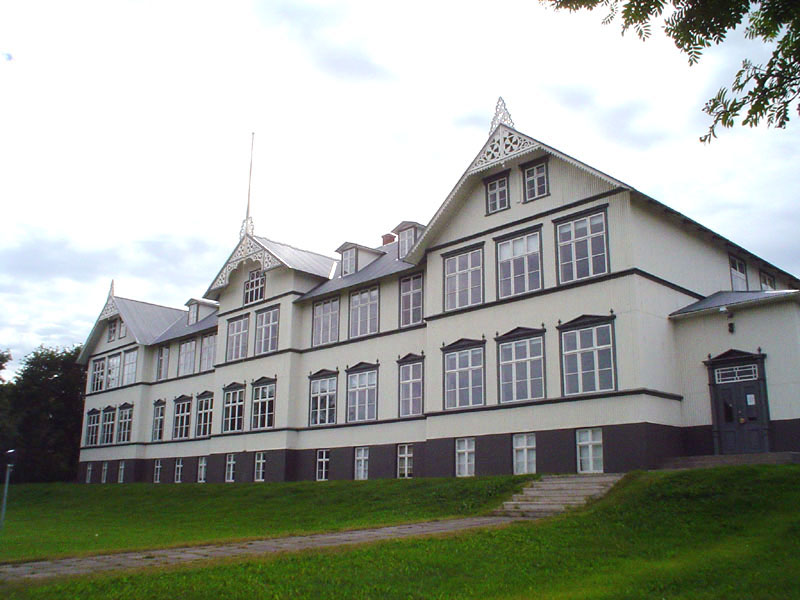
- The oldest school building, from 1904
- Akureyri, Iceland

Information
- School type: Public Gymnasium
- Motto: Virðing, víðsýni, árangur (Respect, liberality, success)
- Established: 1880
- Headmaster: Karl Frímannsson
- Key people: Sigurlaug Anna Gunnarsdóttir, vice headmistress
- Enrollment: 750
- Song: Skólasöngur MA
- National ranking: 2nd
- Newspaper: Muninn
- Yearbook: Carmina
- Website: https://www.ma.is/is/english

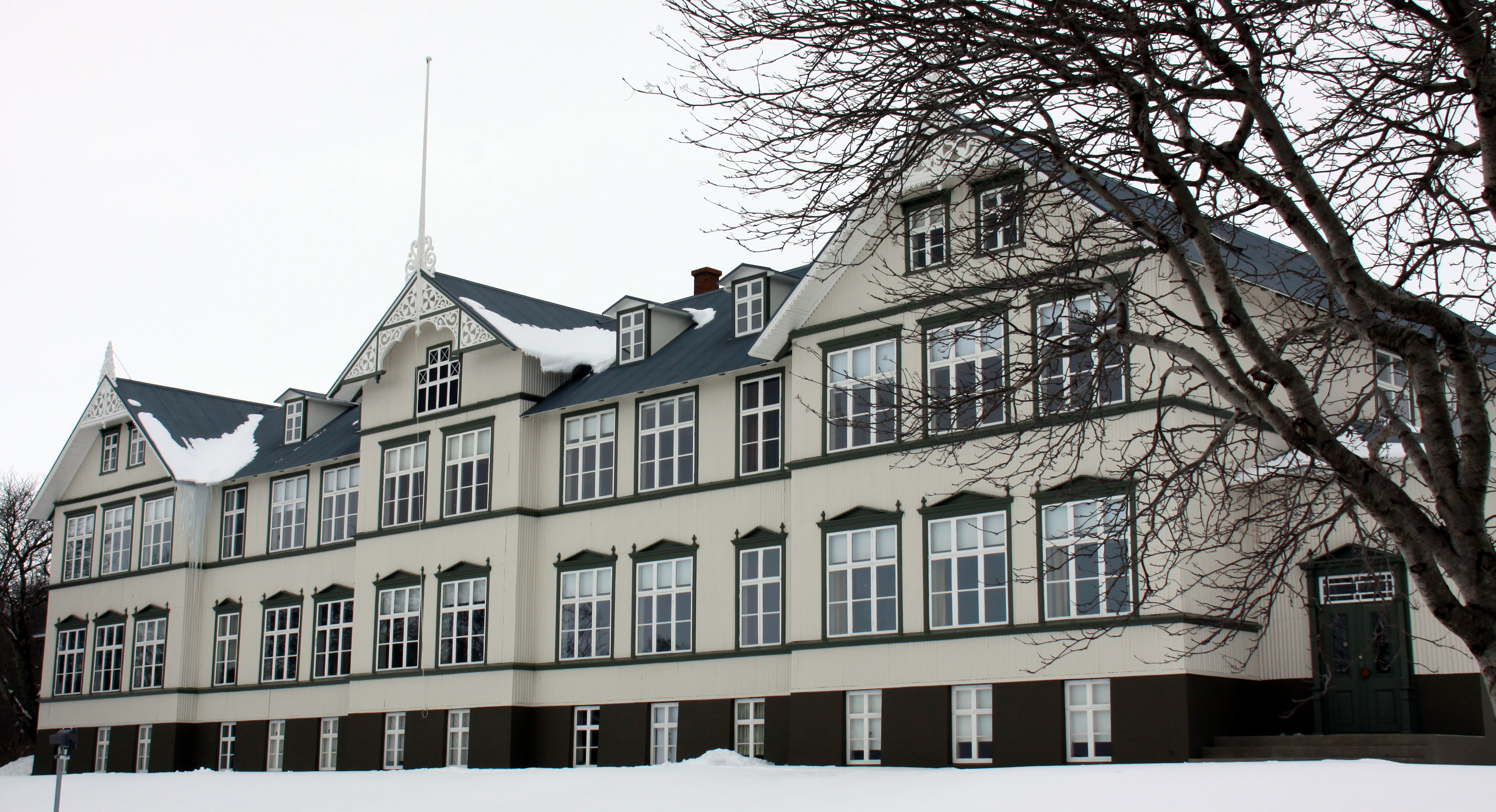
The Gamli Skóli, the oldest building of the High School precinct.

The Akureyri Junior College (Icelandic: Menntaskólinn á Akureyri [ˈmɛn̥taˌskouːlɪn au ˈaːkʏrˌeiːrɪ], regionally also [ˈmɛntʰa-, ˈaːkʰʏr-]; Latin: Schola Akureyrensis) is an Icelandic gymnasium (academic secondary school). It is one of the oldest educational institutions in Iceland.

The Menntaskólinn á Akureyri traces its roots to the ancient school in Hólar in Hjaltadalur valley, founded in the beginning of Jón Ögmundsson's episcopacy in 1130. Operation of that school was discontinued in 1802 but a campaign to reopen the school of the 'Northland' was soon launched. Success came in 1880 when a 'learned school' was opened at Möðruvellir in the valley of Hörgárdalur. The building in Möðruvellir burnt down in 1902 and the school was moved to Akureyri, where it is currently located.

Today the Junior College is attended by about 700 pupils every year, and on the national day of Iceland, 17 June, approximately 120 students graduate yearly. The Junior College's headmaster is Karl Frímannsson. Tryggvi Gíslason (born 11 June 1938) was headmaster of Akureyri Junior College from 1973 to 2003. Tryggvi graduated with a mag. art. degree and taught Icelandic at the University of Bergen in Norway.

The college is based on tradition. A few of these are:

- Singing: A few times each semester, students gather outside the headmaster's office to sing for him. If they sing well enough, he grants the students permission to skip the next class and gather in the auditorium to sing. (English: singing in the auditorium)
- No alcohol: All gatherings in the name of the school are alcohol free. Almost all students respect this and consider it something that distinguishes their school from others in Iceland.
- Different school year: As in other schools in Iceland this one has two terms, an autumn term and a spring term; but this school has its autumn exams after Christmas, while most other schools have the exams before Christmas.

== Notable faculty members ==
- Björgvin Guðmundsson, composer
- Páll Skúlason, philosopher
- Steingrímur J. Sigfússon, politician
- Tómas Ingi Olrich, later member of Alþingi, Minister of Education, and ambassador to France
- Tryggvi Gíslason, headmaster from 1973 to 2003

== Notable former pupils ==
- Ari Brynjolfsson, physicist
- Eysteinn Björnsson, writer
- Jens Garðar Helgason, politician
- Sigurður Helgason, mathematician
- Sigurður Þórarinsson, geologist
