= Menntaskólinn við Sund =

Secondary school in Reykjavík, Iceland

Location
- Reykjavík; Iceland
- Coordinates: 64°07′53″N 21°51′35″W

Information
- Type: Secondary school
- Established: 1969

Menntaskólinn við Sund (MS) is a secondary school in Reykjavík founded in 1969. At the time, there were only 4 other such schools in Iceland.
