= Stúdentspróf =

Educational diploma in Iceland

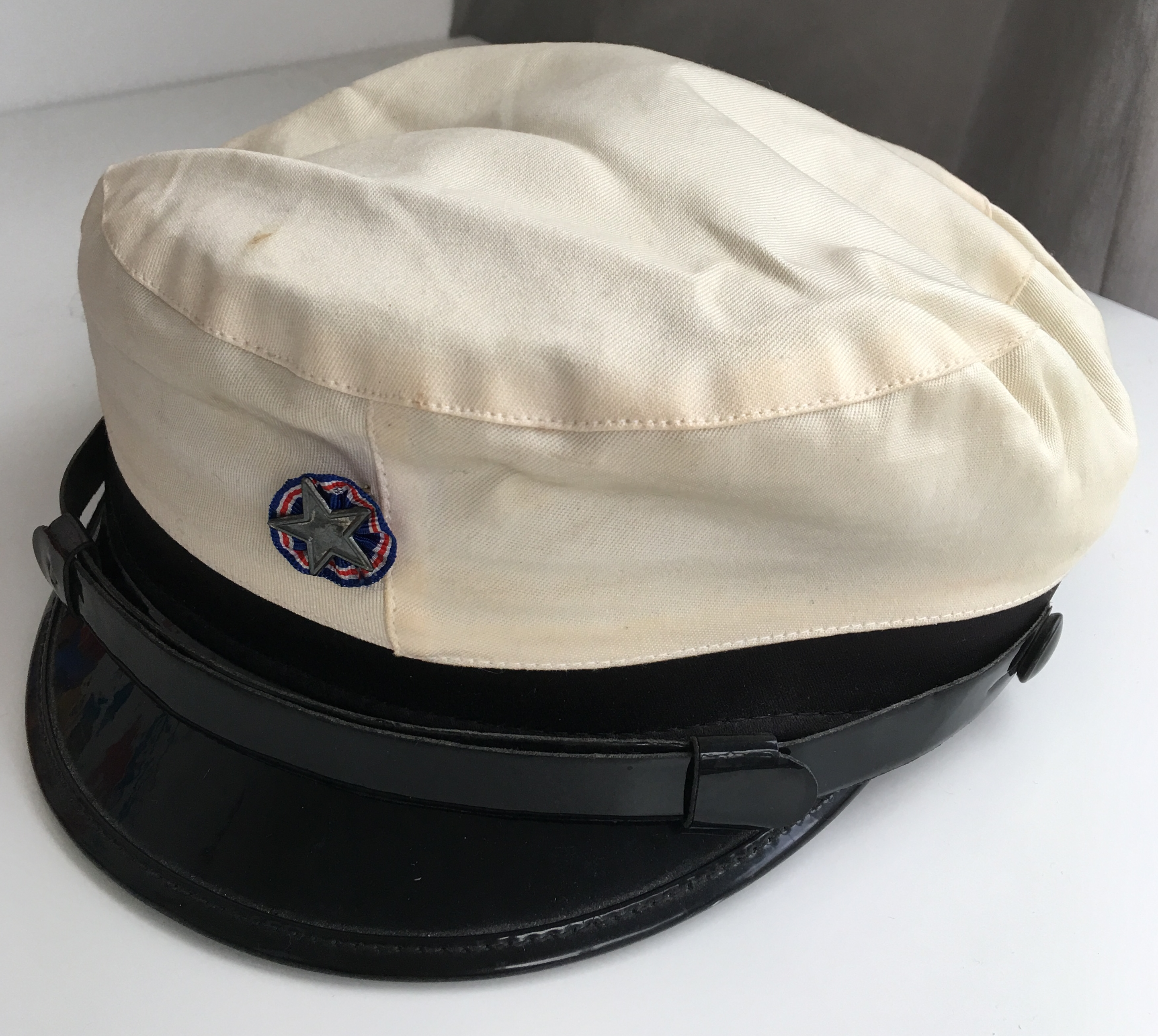
In Iceland, it is customary to wear a white and black student cap during one's graduation with a Stúdentspróf.

In Iceland, the Stúdentspróf (Icelandic pronunciation: [ˈstuːtɛn(t)sˌpʰrouːf]) is an educational diploma that counts as a qualification for university matriculation. Students aiming to earn the Stúdentspróf generally take three years, and most students earn their Stúdentspróf at age 19, after 13 years of formal schooling. The grading scale ranges in steps of 0.5 from 0 to 10, with 10 being the highest.

The curricula for the diploma are regulated by the Ministry of Education; any secondary school can offer the Stúdentspróf as long as it conforms to the ministry's regulations.

== See also ==
- Education in Iceland
- Matriculation examination
