= List of University of Iceland buildings =

This is a list of buildings belonging to the University of Iceland.

- Aðalbygging (main building)
- Askja
- Árnagarður
- Eirberg
- Endurmenntun
- Gamli Garður
- Gimli
- Hagi
- Háskólatorg
- Íþróttafræðasetur
- Lögberg
- Læknagarður
- Oddi
- Tæknigarður
- VR I, II and III
