= Sigrún (name) =

Sigrún is a given name. Notable people with the name include:

- Sigrún Sjöfn Ámundadóttir (born 1988), Icelandic basketball player
- Sigrún Aðalbjarnardóttir (born 1949), Norwegian professor
- Sigrun Berg (1901–1982), Norwegian weaver
- Sigrún Edda Björnsdóttir (born 1958), Icelandic actress
- Sigrun Karin Christiansen (born 1932), Norwegian writer
- Sigrún Davíðsdóttir (born 1955), Icelandic journalist
- Sigrun Eng (born 1951), Norwegian politician
- Sigrún Klara Hannesdóttir (born 1943), Icelandic professor
- Sigrun Krause (born 1954), East German cross-country skier
- Sigrun Kristiansen (born 1989), Faroese footballer
- Sigrún Magnúsdóttir (born 1944), Icelandic politician
- Sigrún Björg Ólafsdóttir (born 2001), Icelandic basketball player
- Sigrun Otto (1896–1980), Norwegian actress
- Sigrun Tara Øverland (born 1983), Norwegian musician
- Sigrún Pálsdóttir (born 1967), Icelandic writer
- Sigrun Slapgard (born 1953), Norwegian journalist
- Sigrún Stefánsdóttir (born 1944), Icelandic news reporter
- Sigrun Svenningsen (1902–1971), Norwegian actress
- Sigrún Brá Sverrisdóttir (born 1990), Icelandic swimmer
- Sigrun Vågeng (born 1950), Norwegian public sector official
- Sigrun Wodars (born 1965), East German middle-distance athlete
