= Hannesdóttir =

Hannesdóttir is an Icelandic surname. Notable people with the surname include:

- Eva Hannesdóttir (born 1987), Icelandic freestyle swimmer
- Sigrún Klara Hannesdóttir (born 1943), Icelandic professor
