= Ómarsdóttir =

Ómarsdóttir (Icelandic: [ˈouːmarsˌtouhtɪr]) is an Icelandic patronym. Notable people with the surname include:

- Iris Ómarsdóttir (born 2003), Norwegian footballer of Icelandic descent
- Katrín Ómarsdóttir (born 1987), Icelandic footballer
- Kristín Ómarsdóttir (born 1962), Icelandic author, poet, playwright, and visual artist
- Silja Bára Ómarsdóttir (born 1971), Icelandic political scientist and professor of international relations, at the University of Iceland
