= Stefánsdóttir =

Icelandic feminine patronym

Stefánsdóttir is an Icelandic patronymic, used by:

- Dóra Stefánsdóttir (born 1985), retired Icelandic footballer who last played for Swedish club LdB FC Malmö
- Erla Stefánsdóttir (1935–2015), Icelandic self-proclaimed seer and public commentator on the topic of the huldufólk
- Greta Salóme Stefánsdóttir (born 1986), Icelandic singer and violinist in the Iceland Symphony Orchestra
- Hanna Guðrún Stefánsdóttir (born 1979), Icelandic team handball player
- Ragna Lóa Stefánsdóttir (born 1966), Icelandic former football player
- Sigrún Stefánsdóttir (born 1947), the head of radio and television of RÚV, the National Icelandic Broadcasting Service
- Sóley Stefánsdóttir (born 1987), Icelandic multi-instrumentalist, singer, and songwriter
- Þórey Rósa Stefánsdóttir (born 1989), Icelandic team handball player
