= Kristín Ingólfsdóttir =

Icelandic pharmaceutical scientist

Rector and president of the University of Iceland
- In office 2005–2015
- Preceded by: Páll Skúlason
- Succeeded by: Jón Atli Benediktsson
- Scientific career

Kristín Ingólfsdóttir is an Icelandic pharmaceutical scientist and former president and rector of the University of Iceland. She served two terms from 2005 to 2015 and was the first woman to hold office in the university's 100-year history. She succeeded Páll Skúlason.

Prior to taking office Kristín was a professor at the university's Faculty of Pharmaceutical Sciences. Following her 10 years in office as rector she was visiting professor at Massachusetts Institute of Technology (MIT) from 2015 to 2017, based at edX and the MIT Media Lab. Kristín is currently chairman of the National University Hospital of Iceland (Icelandic: Landspítali) Advisory Board and Vice President of the Board of Governors of the University of Luxembourg.

She is chairman of the Board of Trustees of the Leifur Eiriksson Foundation, appointed by the Central Bank of Iceland and the University of Virginia. Kristin sits on the boards of two Icelandic research-based startup companies, Atmonia and Akthelia and is a member of the International Scientific Committee at the University of Grenoble in France. She is a board member of the European Women Rectors' Association (EWORA) and the Committee of the Nordic Medical Research Councils (NOS-M). From 2011 to 2015 Kristin served as an elected board member of the European University Association (EUA) and was a longstanding member of the Medicine Council of the Icelandic Medicines Agency.

== Education ==
Kristín studied at Reykjavik Junior College, then continued to study pharmaceutical sciences at the University of Iceland (BSc, 1978). She received her doctoral degree from King's College London (PhD, 1983), in the field of pharmaceutical chemistry, focusing on natural products. Her PhD supervisor was Professor Peter J. Hylands. Her research has involved isolation and chemical identification of active pharmacological compounds from Icelandic lichens, mosses and marine organisms. She has further written on the urgency of strategic reform in education to meet changing needs for working environments, society and individual well-being.

Academic offices
Preceded by Páll Skúlason	Rector of the University of Iceland; 2005–2015	Succeeded by Jón Atli Benediktsson
