= Inga Bergmann Árnadóttir =

Icelandic academic

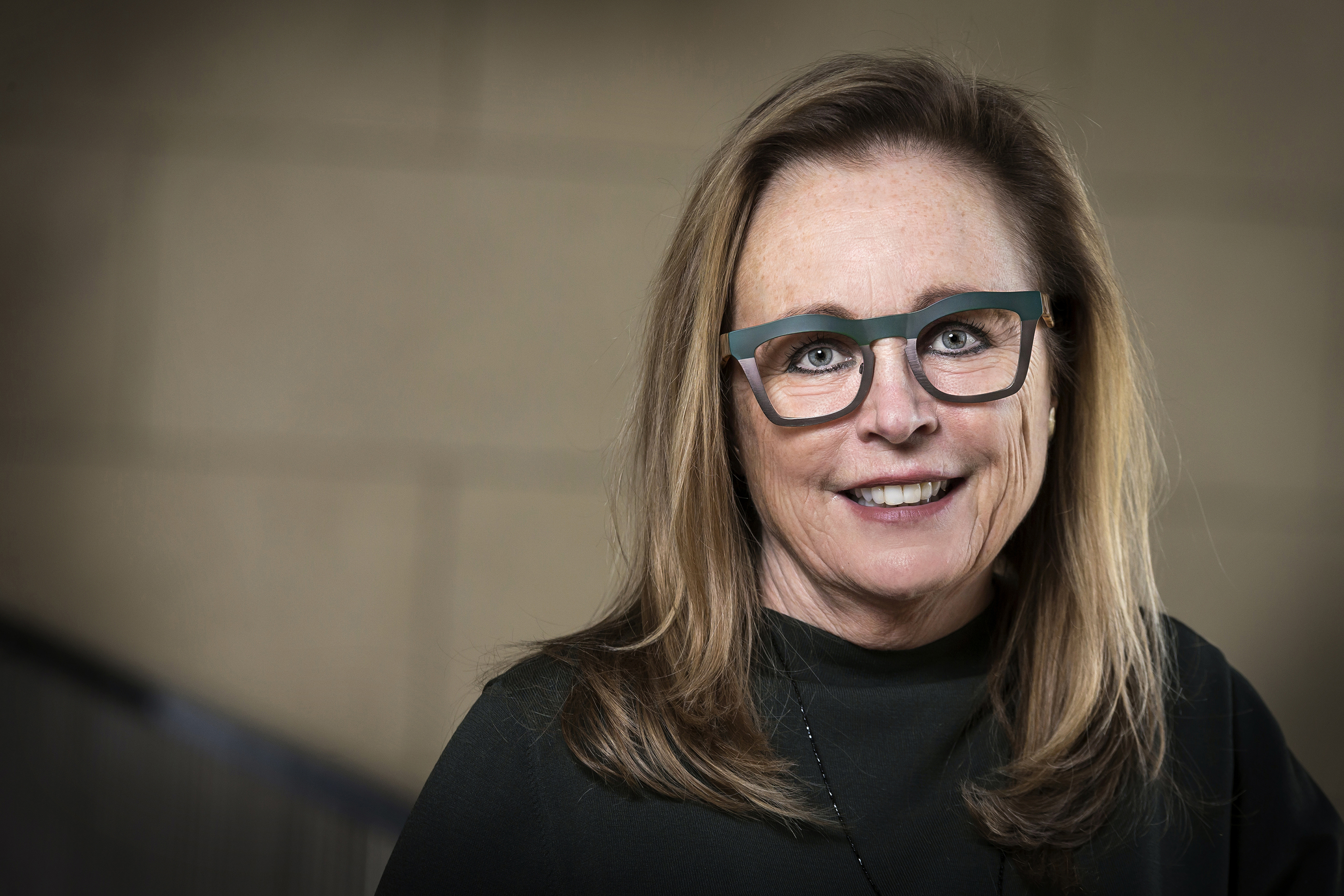
- Born: 1955 (age 70–71)
- Occupation: Professor
- Organization: University of Iceland

Inga Bergmann Árnadóttir (born 1955) is a professor at the University of Iceland Faculty of Odontology.

== Career ==
Inga completed a cand. odont. degree from the Royal Dental College in Aarhus, Denmark in 1981. She completed her thesis at the Nordic School of Public Health in Gothenburg in 1983 on Sammehæng mellem forbrug af sukker og caries i Island.

She graduated with a Master of Public Health degree in dept. health policy and administration with a focus on dental hygiene from the University of North Carolina in 1995, with a thesis on: Approximal caries and sugar consumption in Icelandic teenagers. She obtained a doctorate (Doctor odont.) from the University of Iceland in 2005 in Dental health and related lifestyle factors in Icelandic teenagers.

From 1985 to 1987, Inga was a sessional lecturer at the Faculty of Odontology and an adjunct lecturer from 1987 to 1993, as well as programme director for dental technology at Fjölbrautarskólinn við Ármúla. She became a lecturer at the Faculty of Odontology in 1997, a senior lecturer in 2003 and a professor in 2009, the first female professor at the Faculty of Odontology. Inga was also the first female head of the Faculty of Odontology, holding the position from 2006 to 2010. Inga is now a professor at the Faculty of Odontology, University of Iceland.

Over the years, Inga has held many positions of trust at the University of Iceland and elsewhere. For example, she sits on the doctoral studies committee and the science committee at the School of Health Sciences, a committee for community outreach by academic staff, and a joint committee for the University of Iceland and the Directorate of Immigration.

== Research ==
Inga's research spans a broad field within dental health and related lifestyle factors in children and teenagers. She has been involved in a large number of Icelandic and international research projects and has written many book chapters and articles.

== Personal life ==
Inga's parents were Kristín Gísladóttir, housewife and seamstress (1914–1994) and Árni Bergmann Oddsson, foreman (1909–1972). Inga has two children, Huldar Örn Andrésson (1984–2006) and Birta Dögg Ingudóttir Andrésdóttir (1988).

== Book chapters ==
- Ann-Katrin Johansson, Inga B. Arnadottir, Göran Koch and Sven Poulsen. (2017). Dental erosion. In Goran Koch, Sven Poulsen, Ivar Espelid and Dorte Haubek, Pediatric dentistry: A clinical approach (pp. 161–174). Chichester: Wiley Blackwell
- Inga B. Árnadóttir. (2016). Tannheilsa og forvarnir tannsjúkdóma íslenskra unglinga. In Guðrún Kristjánsdóttir, Sigrún Aðalbjarnardóttir and Sóley S. Bender, Ungt fólk. Tekist á við tilveruna (pp. 59–70). Reykjavík: Hið íslenska bókmenntafélag.

== Articles ==
- Mulic, A., Árnadóttir, I. B., Jensdottir, T. and Kopperud, S. E. (2018). Opinions and treatment decisions for dental erosive wear: A questionnaire survey among Icelandic dentists. International Journal of Dentistry. Article ID 8572371. Volume 2018.
- Wang, N. J., Petersen, P. E., Sveinsdóttir, E. G., Árnadóttir, I. B. and Källestål, C. (2018). Recall intervals and time used for examination and prevention by dentists in child dental care in Denmark, Iceland, Norway and Sweden in 1996 and 2014. Community Dent Health, 35(1): 52–57.
- Arnadóttir, I. B., Holbrook, W. P., Eggertsson, H., Guðmundsdóttir, H., Jonsson, S. H., Gudlaugsson, J. O., Eliasson, S. T. and Agustsdottir. H. (2010). Prevalence of dental erosion in children: a national survey. Community Dent Oral Epidemiol, 38(6): 521– 526.
- Agustsdottir, H., Gudmundsdottir, H., Eggertsson, H., Jonsson, S. H., Gudlaugsson, J. O., Saemundsson, S. R., Eliasson, S. T., Arnadottir, I. B. and Holbrook, W. P. (2010). Caries prevalence of permanent teeth: a national survey of children in Iceland using ICDAS. Community Dent Oral Epidemiol, 38(4): 299–309.
- Árnadóttir, I. B., Ketley, C. E., Loveren, C., Seppä, L., Cochran, J. A. Polido, M., Athanossouli, T., Holbrook, W. P. and O´Mullane, D. M. (2004). A European perspective on fluoride use in seven countries. Community Dent Oral Epidemiol, 32(Suppl. 1): 69–73.
