= Thor Sigfusson =

Icelandic entrepreneur

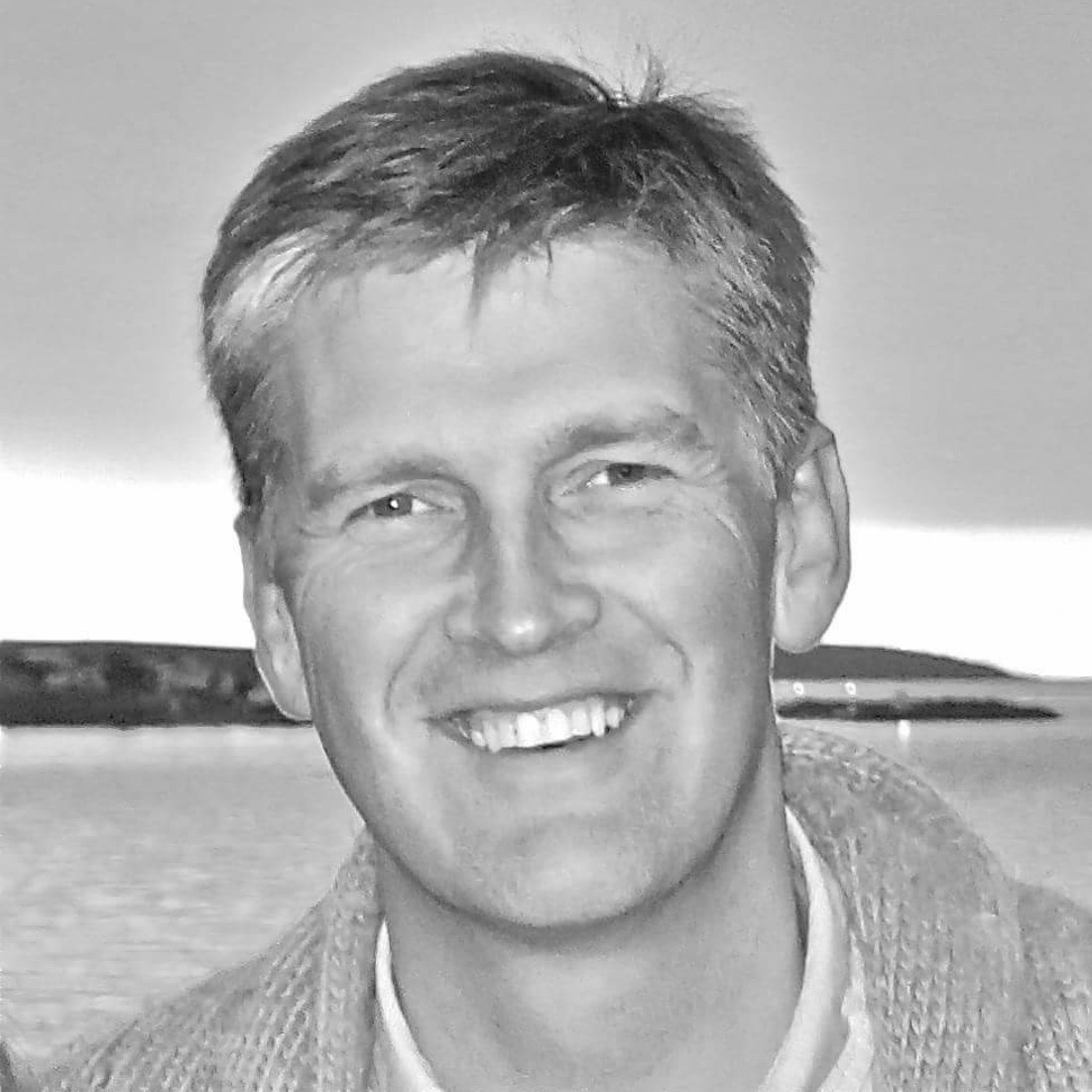
- Born: Vestman Islands, Iceland
- Education: University of North Carolina; University of Iceland

Thor Sigfusson is an Icelandic entrepreneur, author and speaker. He is the founder and chairman of Iceland Ocean Cluster, a business incubator for fisheries. He is also the co-founder of Codland, Hlemmur Food Hall and Grandi Food Hall. Sigfusson advocates for the achievement of "100% Fish" in the fisheries industry, an approach to sustainability that develops products and processes to use all parts of the fish. Before the establishment of the Iceland Ocean Cluster, only 60% of a codfish was estimated to be used, and the rest discarded. As of 2018, an estimated 95% of each codfish was used in some way.

Sigfusson has written nine books on topics of international business, knowledge networks and salmon. As of 2023, he was appointed as chair of a committee for the Icelandic government, to encourage innovation and the development of a circular economy. In 2024, Sigfusson was awarded the Knights Cross of the Order of the Falcon, Iceland's highest civilian award, for his work in the field of fisheries.

== Early life and education ==
Sigfusson was born in the Vestman Islands archipelago just off the south coast of Iceland. He attended the University of North Carolina where he completed his BA degree in 1991 and his Masters in Economics in 1993.

== Career ==
External videos
- “Hope in the water: Using 100% Fish”, PBS, 06/14/24.

After completing his MS degree in Economics in 1993, Sigfusson became a special advisor to the Minister of Finance of Iceland in January 1994. After working there for four years, he left the ministry to join the Nordic Investment Bank as deputy managing director. In January 2003, he left Nordic Investment bank and joined Iceland Chamber of Commerce as Managing Director. In 2005, Sigfusson joined Sjova Insurance as Managing Director of the company. He left in 2009, following a restructuring of the company that separated its investment and insurance operations.

Sigfusson then studied at the University of Iceland, completing his PhD in International Business in 2012. In his studies he focused on how entrepreneurs used networks in their internationalisation. His studies indicated companies and entrepreneurs in the marine industry were not well connected with each other. He began working on a network to increase interaction between marine tech companies and launched the Iceland Ocean Cluster in 2011. The cluster focuses on developing innovative ideas in the fishing industry. In May 2012, Sigfusson founded the Ocean Cluster House.

Since establishing the Iceland Ocean Cluster, Sigfusson has spent his time speaking to audience in US and Europe about the opportunities in building networks in the marine industry. In 2015, Sigfusson co-founded a sister cluster to the IOC, the New England Ocean Cluster to drive new ideas in the marine industry.

Using the research and information generated from Iceland Ocean Cluster, Sigfusson founded Codland in September 2012. Codland emerged as the merger of a biotechnology company and fishing companies with plans to fully utilize byproducts from the North Atlantic Cod. The cluster also initiated the North Atlantic Marine Cluster Project, which works to increase relations between ocean and marine industries in the North Atlantic. In 2013, he co-founded the company Collagen with the aim to use fish skin to create marine collagen. In 2016 he co-founded Hlemmur Food Hall, Sjó-Food Hall and Reykjavik Foods.

== Bibliography ==
- Brennan and Isis. North Atlantic Salmon Fund. 2007.
- International business: new challenges, new forms, new perspectives. Basingstoke: Palgrave Macmillan. 2012. ISBN 978-0230320987.
- The New Fish Wave: How to Ignite the Seafood Industry. Leete's Island Books. 2020. ISBN 9780918172785.
- 100% Fish. Leete's Island Books. 2023. ISBN 978-0918172-89-1.

== Selected publications ==
- Sigfusson, Thor; Chetty, Sylvie (April 2013). "Building international entrepreneurial virtual networks in cyberspace". Journal of World Business. 48 (2): 260–270. doi:10.1016/j.jwb.2012.07.011. ISSN 1090-9516.
- Sigfusson, Thor; Arnason, Ragnar; Morrissey, Karyn (May 2013). "The economic importance of the Icelandic fisheries cluster—Understanding the role of fisheries in a small economy". Marine Policy. 39: 154–161. doi:10.1016/j.marpol.2012.10.015. ISSN 0308-597X.
- Sigfusson, Thor (2016). "A New Utilization Movement". In Simonyi, András; Cagan, Debra (eds.). Nordic Ways. Washington, D.C.: Center for Transatlantic Relations. pp. 232–238. ISBN 9780990772118.
