= Steven Campana =

Canadian fisheries scientist, academic and author

Steven E. Campana
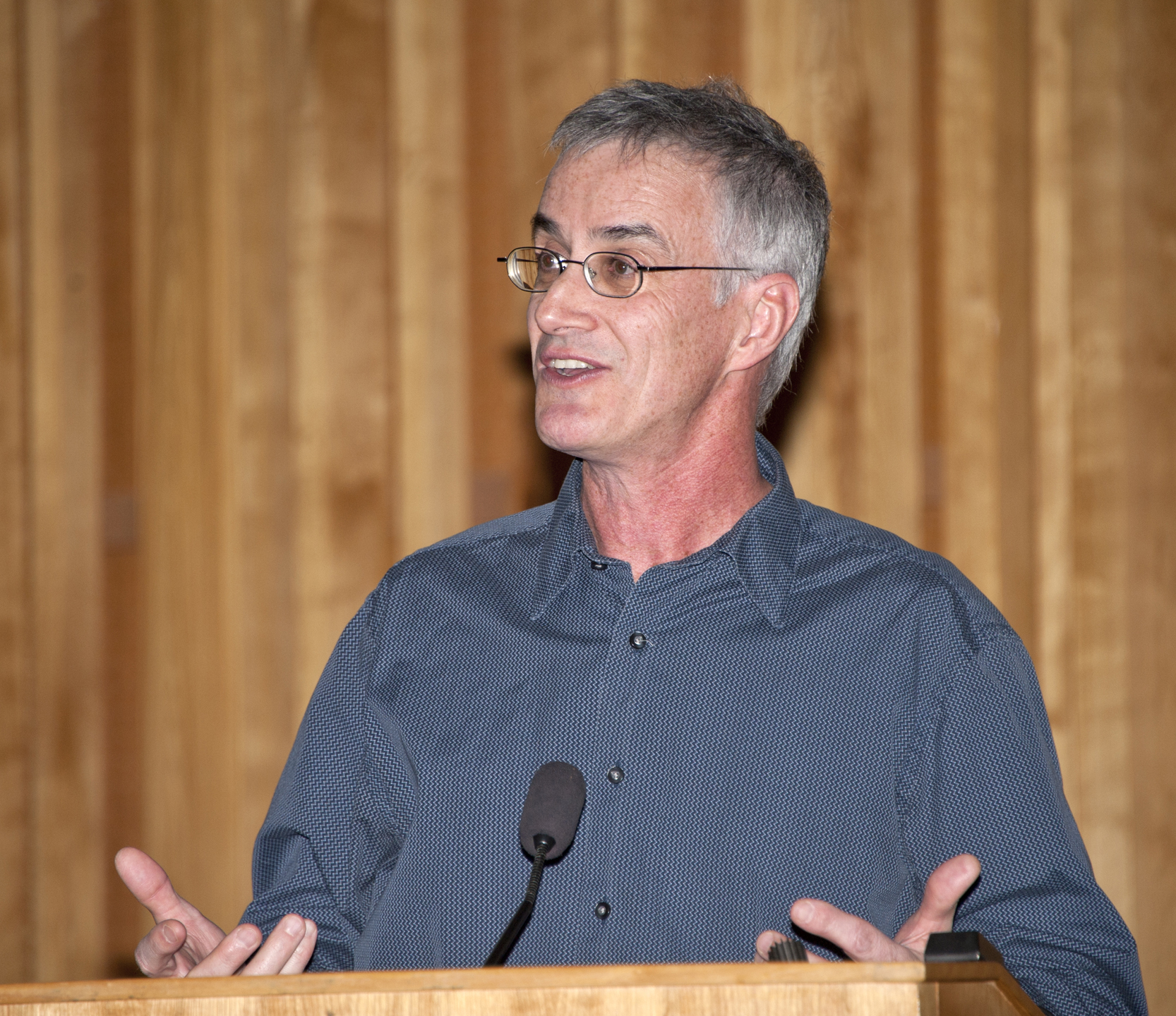
- Born: November 22, 1955 (age 70); Montreal, Quebec, Canada
- Education: B.Sc., Biology and Chemistry; Ph.D., Zoology
- Alma mater: Dalhousie University; University of British Columbia
- Occupations: Fisheries scientist, academic and author
- Scientific career
- Workplaces: Bedford Institute of Oceanography; University of Iceland

Steven E. Campana is a Canadian fisheries scientist, academic and author. He is best known for his research on otolith-based age and growth applications, shark biology, and fish population dynamics. He is currently a professor of Life and Environmental Science at the University of Iceland.

== Education ==
Campana earned a BSc in Biology and Chemistry from Dalhousie University in 1977, followed by a PhD in Zoology from the University of British Columbia in 1983.

== Career ==
Between 1983 and 2015, Campana took on various roles as a federal scientist at Fisheries and Oceans Canada, first as a Research Scientist, then as the Head of the Growth and Production Section and later as a Senior Scientist in the Population Ecology Division. For over 30 years, Campana worked in the Department of Fisheries and Oceans where he was the youngest Senior Scientist. He created and led both the Otolith Research Laboratory (1983–2015) and the Canadian Shark Research Laboratory (1998–2015). Concurrently, he was appointed as an adjunct professor at Dalhousie University in 1986 and at the University of Windsor in 2007. He has been employed as a professor in the Faculty of Life and Environmental Sciences at the University of Iceland since 2015.

Campana received the Stevenson Lectureship Award for cutting edge science as a young researcher in an aquatic discipline in 1994, a Lifetime Achievement award for outstanding international contributions to otolith science in 2004, and was inducted into the Legends of Canadian Fisheries Science and Management by the Canadian Aquatic Resources Section in 2016. He has written or edited six books on otolith research and application, as well as more than 250 scientific articles and technical reports on various aspects of marine science and conservation. In one analysis, he was listed as one of the most highly cited in fisheries science.

== Research ==
The age composition of a fish population forms the foundation for most fish stock assessments, fishing quotas and conservation strategies. Campana's research on fish otoliths (earstones) focused on the development of new and more robust age determination techniques, many of which have been implemented in species of fish, whales, bivalves, sharks, and skates worldwide. Alongside John D. Neilson, he developed and popularized the use of otolith daily growth increments as a tool for studying young fish. His applications of otolith trace element and isotopic chemistry have become routine tools for tracking fish stock migrations and reconstructing temperature history, while his research on otolith shape has been used to discriminate among fish stocks.

As Canada's primary investigator of North Atlantic shark species, Campana developed the initial stock assessments for porbeagle, blue and mako shark in Canadian waters, as well as the Canadian contribution to the ICCAT North Atlantic assessment. His integration of modern fish ageing protocols to sharks and skates led to a major reassessment of the longevity of shark species worldwide, leading to improved conservation efforts. Through application of satellite tags to pelagic shark species, he demonstrated that large numbers of sharks caught as bycatch in commercial longline fishing gear were dying shortly after live release, a finding that has significant implications for global shark conservation. In collaboration with other shark biologists, his satellite tagging results have helped revise our understanding of the highly migratory nature of pelagic shark species and the implication for high seas management.

In the broader field of fish population dynamics, Campana's research has demonstrated that both marine and freshwater fish species in the polar regions are gradually shifting their distributions and productivity to compensate for warming waters, while his research on long-term growth trends have underlined the dominant influence of fishing and the environment at the century scale.

Campana worked with fellow colleagues on finding the changes in Atlantic cod populations over the past 1100 years of fishing, showing how cod mortality rates dominated overall population over time.
