= Jón Atli Benediktsson =

Icelandic academic

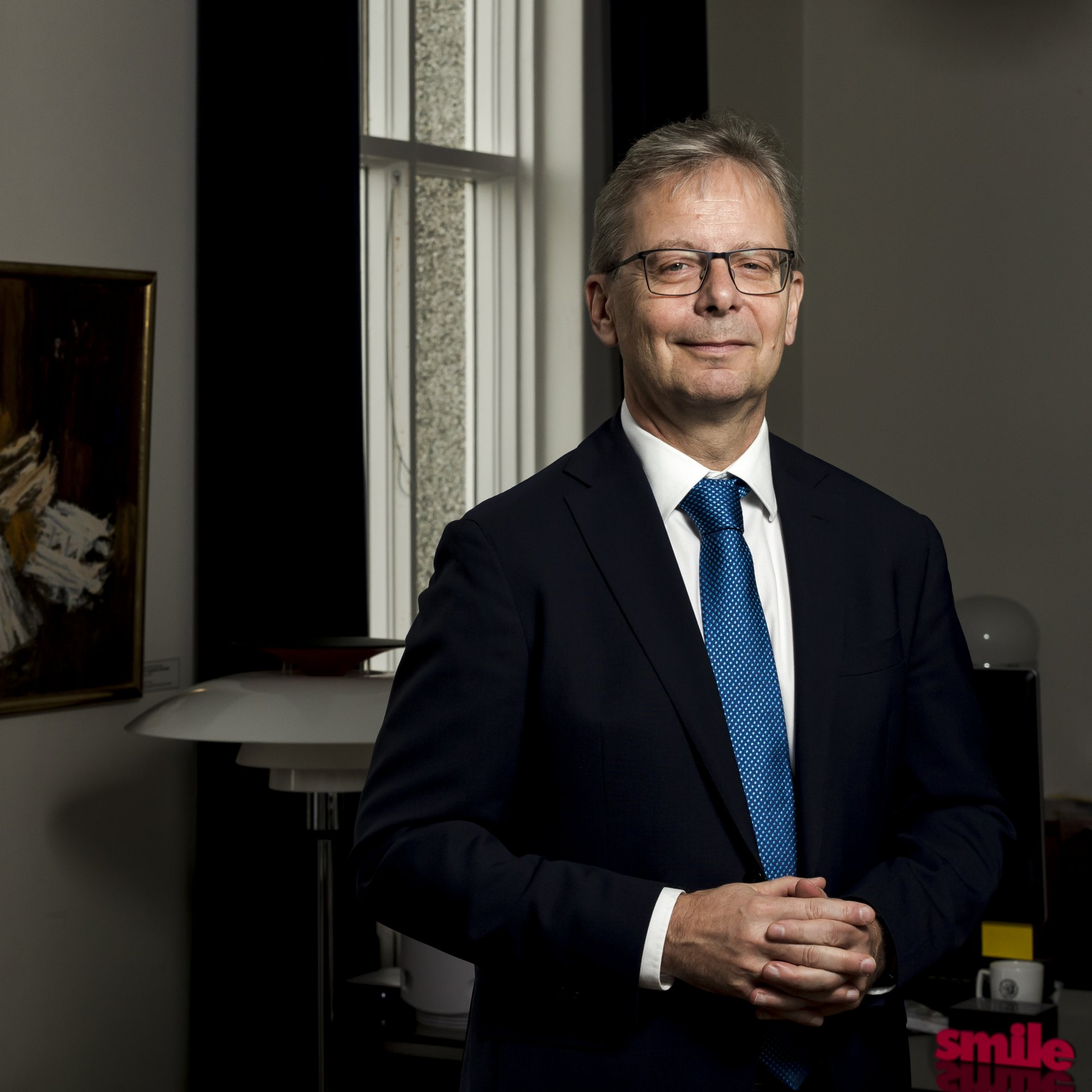

Rector and president of the University of Iceland
- In office 1 July 2015 – 30 June 2025
- Preceded by: Kristín Ingólfsdóttir
- Succeeded by: Silja Bára R. Ómarsdóttir

Personal details
- Born: 19 May 1960 (age 66) Reykjavík, Iceland
- Spouse: Stefanía Óskarsdóttir
- Children: 2
- Education: Menntaskólinn í Reykjavík; University of Iceland; Purdue University
- Profession: Electrical engineer, professor, researcher, college administrator
- Scientific career

Jón Atli Benediktsson (born 19 May 1960) was the rector and president of the University of Iceland and is a professor in electrical and computer engineering at the university. His research fields are remote sensing, image analysis, pattern recognition, machine learning, data fusion, analysis of biomedical signals and signal processing. He has published over 400 scientific articles in these fields and is one of the most influential scientists in the world according to Publons’ lists in 2018 and 2019.

== Education ==
Jón Atli Benediktsson completed doctoral degree (PhD) in electrical engineering from Purdue University, West Lafayette, Indiana in 1990. The dissertation's title is “Statistical Methods and Neural Network Approaches for Classification of Data from Multiple Sources”. At Purdue, he received the Stevan J. Kristof Award Outstanding Graduate Student Award in Remote Sensing (1991). He completed the MSEE degree in electrical engineering from Purdue in 1987. The title of the MSEE thesis is “Methods for Multisource Data Analysis in Remote Sensing”. Jón Atli completed his degree in electrical engineering at the University of Iceland in 1984. He graduated from Menntaskólinn í Reykjavík (Junior College in Reykjavik) in 1980. There he was on the school's debate team and the president of Vísindafélag Framtíðarinnar (science society of the school). He had previously attended classes at Vörðuskóli (passing landspróf, the national standard lower secondary school exam), Hlíðaskóli, Æfinga- og tilraunaskóli (of the Iceland's School of Education), and Ísaksskóli.

At Purdue (1986–1990), Jón Atli was a research assistant at the School of Electrical Engineering and Laboratory for Application of Remote Sensing (LARS). After completing his doctoral degree, Jón Atli was for six months a post-doc at Purdue. Before entering graduate studies, he was on the staff of the University of Iceland's Engineering Research Institute and a part-time teacher at the University of Iceland from 1984 to 1985.

== Professional experience ==
Jón Atli has been with the University of Iceland since 1991, first as assistant professor of electrical engineering (1991–1994), associate professor of electrical engineering (1994–1996), and since 1996 as professor of electrical and computer engineering. During these years, he taught many courses, e.g., on pattern recognition, signal processing, probabilistic methods, circuit analysis, soft computation and remote sensing. Nine doctoral students have completed doctorates from the University of Iceland under Jón Atli's supervision.

Jón Atli was the pro-rector for science and academic affairs at the University of Iceland from February 2009 to July 2015. He was the director of academic development and the assistant to the rector and president at the University of Iceland, 2006–2009.

Jón Atli has been very active in international collaboration and has taught in many countries. He has advised master's and doctoral students at several universities. He has also been a PhD opponent at many institutions and served on various doctoral committees on four continents. He was a visiting professor at the University of Trento, Italy, from 2002 to 2015. He was a visiting professor at Kingston University, Kingston upon Thames, England, from 2000 to 2003. Jón Atli taught a course at Jilin University in Changchun, China in 2007. He was a research scientist at the Joint Research Centre (JRC), European Commission, Ispra, Italy, from April to July 1998. Jón Atli was a visiting scholar at DTU, Lyngby, Denmark, from January to March 1998 and at Purdue University, W. Lafayette, Indiana, USA, from January to August 1995. He was a fellow, Australian Defence Force Academy (ADFA), University of New South Wales, August 1997. Jón Atli was a member of the Ad Hoc Graduate Faculty, University of Louisville, Louisville, from November 2005 to 2009. Jón Atli was the first chairman of the board of directors of the energy company Metan Ltd. from 1999 to 2004.

== Service ==
In 1996, Jón Atli was elected chairman of the Technical Committee on Data Fusion, which is operated by the IEEE Geoscience and Remote Sensing Society. He was re-elected chairman in 1997 and 1998. In 1999, he was elected to the administrative committee (AdCom) of the IEEE Geoscience and Remote Sensing Society (GRSS) and was a member of AdCom until 2014. In GRSS, Jón Atli oversaw various projects and was the vice president of technical activities (2002) and the vice president of professional activities (2008–2009). Jón Atli was elected executive vice president in 2010 and for 2011–2012 president of the IEEE Geoscience and Remote Sensing Society.

Jón Atli established IEEE's Iceland Section in 2000 and was its founding chairman from 2000 to 2003. He had previously been the first student branch councillor when the IEEE student association was founded at the University of Iceland 1994.

== Editorial work ==
Jón Atli has been active on editorial boards of scientific journals. He was the editor in chief of IEEE Transactions on Geoscience and Remote Sensing, from 2003 to 2008. He has been co-editor of the journal since 1999. He was on the editorial board of the Proceedings of IEEE, from 2014 to 2019. He has been an associate editor of IEEE Access since 2013. He has been an associate editor of IEEE Geoscience and Remote Sensing Letters, since 2003. He has been on the international editorial board of the International Journal of Image and Data Fusion since 2009. He was the chairman of the management committee of the IEEE Journal of Selected Topics in Applied Earth Observation 2007–2010. He has been on the editorial board of Remote Sensing since 2015. He has been on the IEEE Press Editorial Board since 2020.

== Recognitions ==
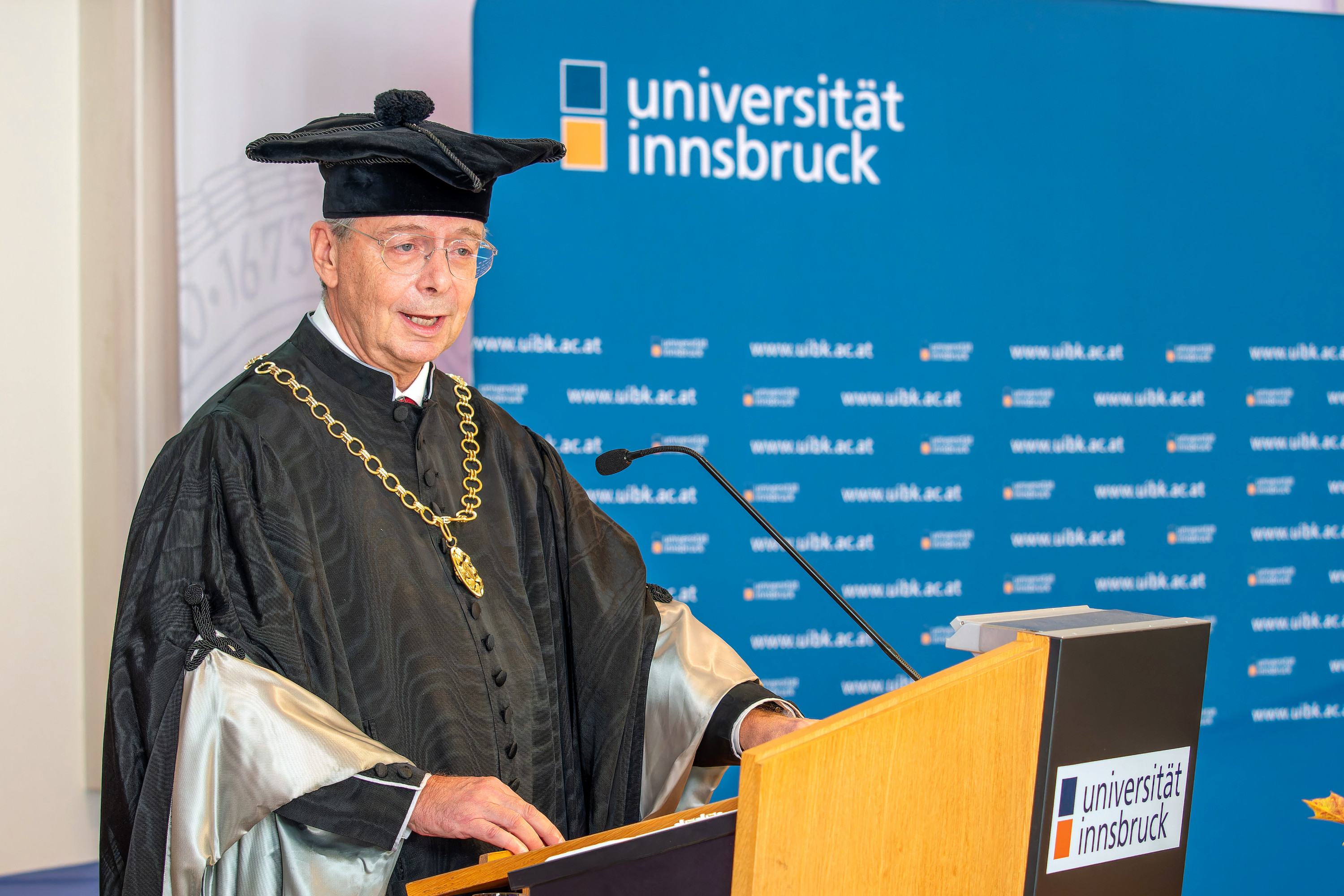
In 2025, Jón Atli Benediktsson became honorary senator of the University of Innsbruck, Austria.

Jón Atli was elected Fellow of the IEEE (Institute of Electrical and Electronics Engineers), 2004 “For contributions to pattern recognition and data fusion in remote sensing”. He was also elected Fellow of SPIE (International Society for Photonics and Optics) in 2013 “For achievements in multi-temporal and hyperspectral remote sensing”. He was elected member of Academiae Europea in 2019. In 2018, Jón Atli received the IEEE GRSS David Landgrebe Award for his outstanding contributions to image analysis of remote sensing data. He received the Best Paper Award from the International Journal of Image and Data Fusion for 2016–2017 along with J. Senthilnath, Deepak Kumar and Xiaoyang Zhang for the article “A novel hierarchical clustering technique based on splitting and merging”. In 2016, Jón Atli received the Outstanding Electrical and Computer Engineer (OECE) Award from the School of Electrical and Computer Engineering, Purdue University. He received the Best Paper Award from the International Journal of Image and Data Fusion for 2012–2013 along with P.R. Marpu, M. Pedergnana, M. Dalla Mura, S. Peeters, and L. Bruzzone for the article “Classification of hyperspectral data using extended attribute profiles based on supervised and unsupervised feature extraction techniques.”

IEEE and the Association of Chartered Engineers in Iceland designated Jón Atli Electrical Engineer of the Year 2013. In 2013 he received the IEEE Geoscience and Remote Sensing Society's Highest Impact Paper Award along with Mathieu Fauvel, Jocelyn Chanussot and Jóhannes R. Sveinsson for the article “Spectral and Spatial Classification of Hyperspectral Data Using SVMs and Morphological Profiles”. In 2011, he also received the Best Paper Award of, IEEE Trans. on Geoscience and Remote Sensing along with Villa, Chanussot, and Jutten for the article “Hyperspectral Image Classification With Independent Component Discriminant Analysis”. He received the Best Paper Award – Novel Engineering Applications at the conference ANNIE ’95 in St. Louis, MO.

Jón Atli received the Research Award of the Engineering Institute of the University of Iceland, in November 2006. He won first prize in the competition “Upp úr skúffunum 2004” (along with Einar Stefánsson and Þór Eysteinsson). He received the Young Research Award of the Icelandic Centre for Research in 1997. Jón Atli also received the IEEE Third Millennium Medal “in recognition and appreciation of valued services and outstanding contributions”, presented in Hawaii, on 27 July 2000.

Jón Atli received the “Outstanding Service Award” from the IEEE Geoscience and Remote Sensing Society in July 2007. He also received recognition from the IEEE Geoscience Remote Sensing Society for “truly exceptional leadership and guidance, as Chairman of the Data Fusion Technical Committee during the three years 1996–1999”, presented in Hawaii, 27 July 2000. Jón Atli received a certificate from IEEE for founding the Icelandic Chapter of IEEE in 2000.

In 2025, Jón Atli was elected to the US National Academy of Engineering, and was awarded an honorary senatorship of the University of Innsbruck.

== Family ==
Jón Atli Benediktsson is the son of Katrín Jónsdóttir and Benedikt Hans Alfonsson. He is married to Stefanía Óskarsdóttir, professor of political science at the University of Iceland. They have two sons, Benedikt Atli, electrical and computer engineer and computer scientist, and Friðrik, student in the Commercial College of Iceland.

Academic offices
| Preceded by Kristín Ingólfsdóttir | Rector of the University of Iceland; 2015–2025 | Succeeded by Silja Bára Ómarsdóttir |
