= Páll Skúlason =

Icelandic philosopher

Páll Skúlason (4 June 1945 – 22 April 2015) was a professor of philosophy and former Rector of the University of Iceland.

Born and raised in Akureyri, in northern Iceland, Páll Skúlason graduated from highschool in 1965. He studied philosophy at the Université catholique de Louvain in Belgium, earning a BA in 1967 and a doctorate in 1973. His doctoral dissertation, Du cercle et du Sujet: problème de compréhension et de méthode dans la Philosophie de Paul Ricœur, considered the philosophy of French philosopher Paul Ricœur.

Páll became a lecturer in philosophy at the University of Iceland in 1971 and was appointed Professor in 1975. He served as Dean of the Faculty of Arts (1977-1979, 1985-1987 and 1995–1997) and Rector of the university from 1997 to 2005.

== Books ==
- Du Cercle et du Sujet, problèmes de compréhension et de méthode dans la philosophie de Paul Ricœur (Louvain: Université Catholique de Louvain, Institut Supérieur de Philosophie, 1973) - Doctoral thesis
- Hugsun og veruleiki [Thought and Reality] (Reykjavík: Hlaðbúð, 1975)
- Pælingar [Speculations] (Reykjavík: Ergo Publishers, 1987) - a collection of essays
- Pælingar II [Speculations II] (Reykjavík: Ergo Publishers, 1989) - a collection of essays
- Siðfræði [Ethics] (Reykjavík: Rannsóknarstofnun í siðfræði [Center for Ethical Studies], 1990)
- Sjö siðfræðilestrar [Seven Lectures in Ethics] (Reykjavík: Rannsóknarstofnun í siðfræði [Center for Ethical Studies], 1991)
- Menning og sjálfstæði [Culture and Autonomy] (Reykjavík: Háskólaútgáfan [The University Press], 1994)
- Í skjóli heimspekinnar [In the Shelter of Philosophy] (Reykjavík: Háskólaútgáfan [The University Press], 1995)
- Umhverfing [Nature and Environment]. (Reykjavík: Háskólaútgáfan [The University Press], 1998)
- Saga and Philosophy (Reykjavik: Háskólaútgáfan [The University Press], 1999)
- Le Cercle du Sujet - dans la philosophie de Paul Ricœur (Paris: L'Harmattan, 2001)

Academic offices
Preceded by Sveinbjörn Björnsson	Rector of the University of Iceland; 1997–2005	Succeeded by Kristín Ingólfsdóttir
