= Askja (building) =

Building in Reykjavik, Iceland

Coordinates: 64°08′14″N 21°56′45″W

Askja

Askja ([ˈasca]) is a building on the campus of the University of Iceland (Sturlugata 7, 101 Reykjavík), named after the volcano Askja. It primarily houses the departments of biology and geosciences. It was designed by architect Maggi Jónsson.

== Design and building ==
- In 1994 the design of Askja by architect Maggi Jónsson began.
- Construction of the exterior by ÍAV began in August 1997 and finished in May 2001.
- In November 2003 the first employees moved in.
- In early 2004 the last employees moved in, and teaching began in Askja.
- The name Askja was picked from 2534 suggestions, and the person who suggested the name was awarded 100.000 ISK.
