= Steinunn Helga Lárusdóttir =

Icelandic academic

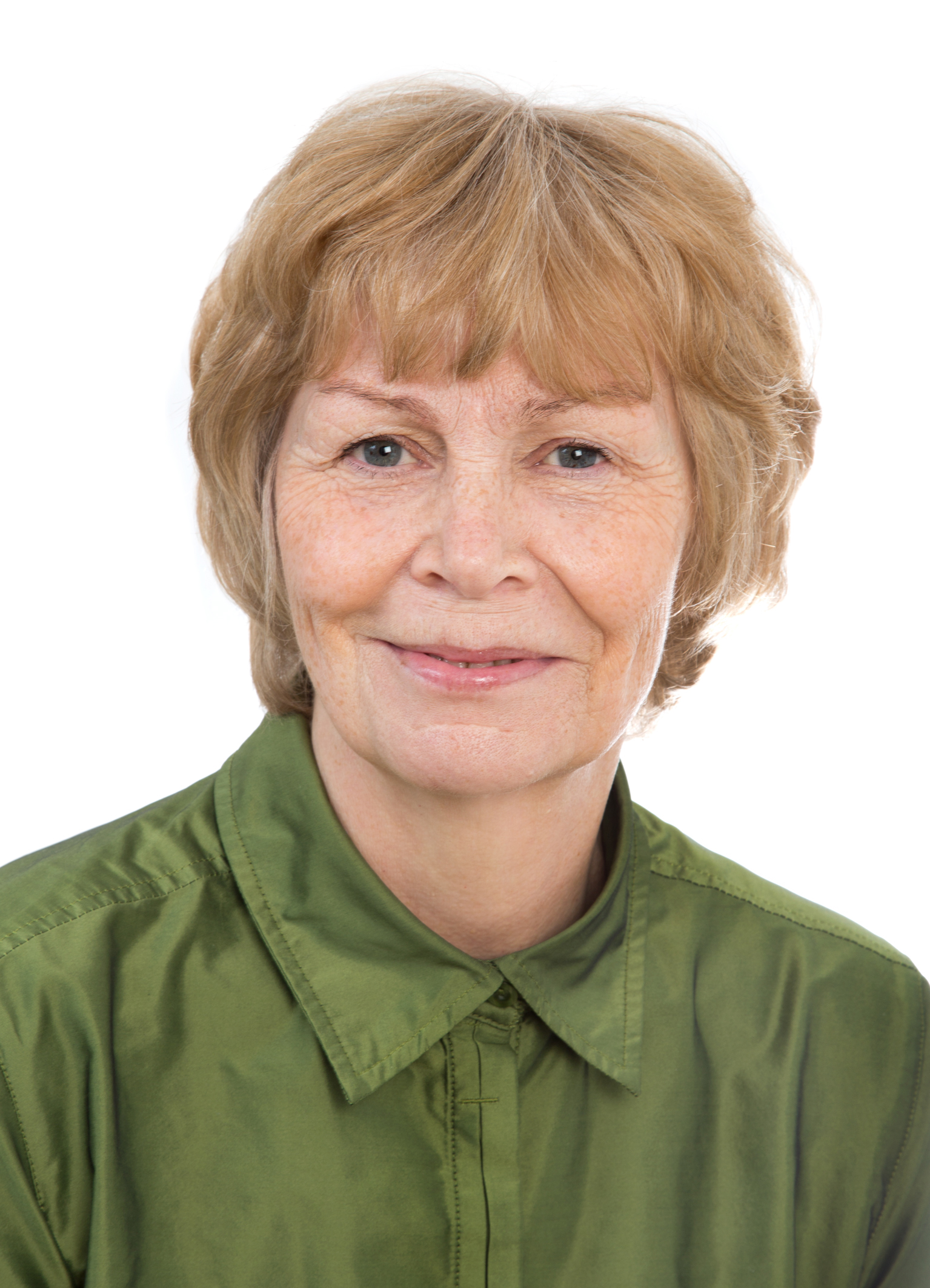
- Born: 12 March 1949 (age 76)
- Occupation: professor emerita in educational leadership at the University of Iceland

Steinunn Helga Lárusdóttir (born 12 March 1949) is a professor emerita in educational leadership at the University of Iceland.

== Education and professional experience ==
Steinunn Helga completed schooling at the Reykjavik Women's Gymnasium and matriculated from Menntaskólinn í Reykjavík (Reykjavik Junior College). She then completed her B.Ed.-degree in primary and lower secondary education in 1975 from the Iceland University of Education, an M.Ed. in 1982 from the University of Illinois at Urbana-Champaign, and a PhD in 2008 from the University of London. Her doctoral dissertation, “Leadership, values and gender: a study of Icelandic head teachers”, discusses the values of school principals and the effect these values have on their actions, especially under difficult circumstances. Steinunn Helga received second prize in the BELMAS dissertation competition in 2009.

Steinunn Helga has served in various positions, within and outside of the university community. From 1984 to 1988, she worked for The Icelandic State Radio (RÚV) in programming and live broadcasting, as well as the polymathic programme Torgið, the programme Academic World and Academic Work, Our language and its use, and Women and New Technology. She also gave radio talks on educational matters. From 1989 to 1998, Steinunn Helga was the principal of the Experimental School of the Iceland University of Education. From 1997 to 1998, she studied evaluation theory at the University of London. Following this, she gave numerous courses and lectured on schools’ self-evaluation in many parts of Iceland as well as in Finland and the Czech Republic. In 1998, she was programme leader for the evaluation of schooling at the Reykjavik Educational Centre.

== Research ==
Steinunn Helga's research has especially focused on school administration, gender equality in schooling, and on gender. She has written numerous articles published in Icelandic and foreign publications. For a quarter of a century, along with Börkur Hansen and Ólafur H. Jóhannsson, she has researched the work of principals in elementary-, and lower secondary schools. This research provides insight into how school principals in elementary-, and lower secondary schools spend their time, and how they would like to spend it. The last research of this type was done in 2017 when the survey included principals’ attitudes toward important values related to schooling.

In recent years, Steinunn Helga has investigated the attitudes of middle leaders (department heads, programme directors and others) towards their work and the emphasis of elementary-, and lower secondary school principals and department heads on instructional leadership. Articles about this research have been published in both Iceland and other countries. Steinunn Helga has also researched gender equality in schools. She researched teachers’ and leaders’ attitudes (including those in the School of Education) towards gender equality. She, along with Guðný Guðbjörnsdóttir, wrote two articles about this. In the years following Iceland's banking collapse, she, along with her collaborators in the Centre for Research in Educational Leadership, Innovation and Educational Evaluation, surveyed the effect of the economic recession on schools in four municipalities.

== Other work and projects ==
Steinunn Helga chaired the Educational Research Association for four years. Among other things during that period, she organised two conferences with foreign lecturers. She founded The Centre for Research in Educational Leadership, Innovation and Educational Evaluation, was a member of the centre's Board of Directors and served as its leader from 2013 to 2017. Steinunn Helga was also a member of the board of directors of The Centre for Research on Equality, Gender and Education from 2010 when it was founded to 2015.

Steinunn Helga has participated in international collaborations of scholars and educational practitioners, organised conferences, and initiated many foreign scholars’ visits to Iceland. She was a member of the Board of Directors and served as leader of the European Network for Improving Research and Development in Educational Leadership and Management. She was on the Teaching Council of the School of Education of the University of Iceland, the School of Education's Permanent Committee on the Master's Programme, reserve Study Programme Leader of Educational Administration and Evaluation Theory, and on the Equal Rights Committee of the Iceland University of Education (later the School of Education of the University of Iceland) from 2005 to 2008.

== Childhood and personal life ==
Steinunn Helga's parents were Vilborg Stefánsdóttir, housewife, from Litli-Hvammur in Mýrdal (1921–2009), and Lárus Jónsson, bookkeeper, (1918–1988). Steinunn Helga's foster father was Jón Kjartansson, MP and District Commissioner of West Skaftafellssýsla. Steinunn Helga grew up in Mýrdalur but moved to Reykjavik while a youth. Steinunn Helga has one daughter.
