= Árnagarður =

Building in Reykjavik, Iceland

Coordinates: 64°08′20″N 21°57′05″W

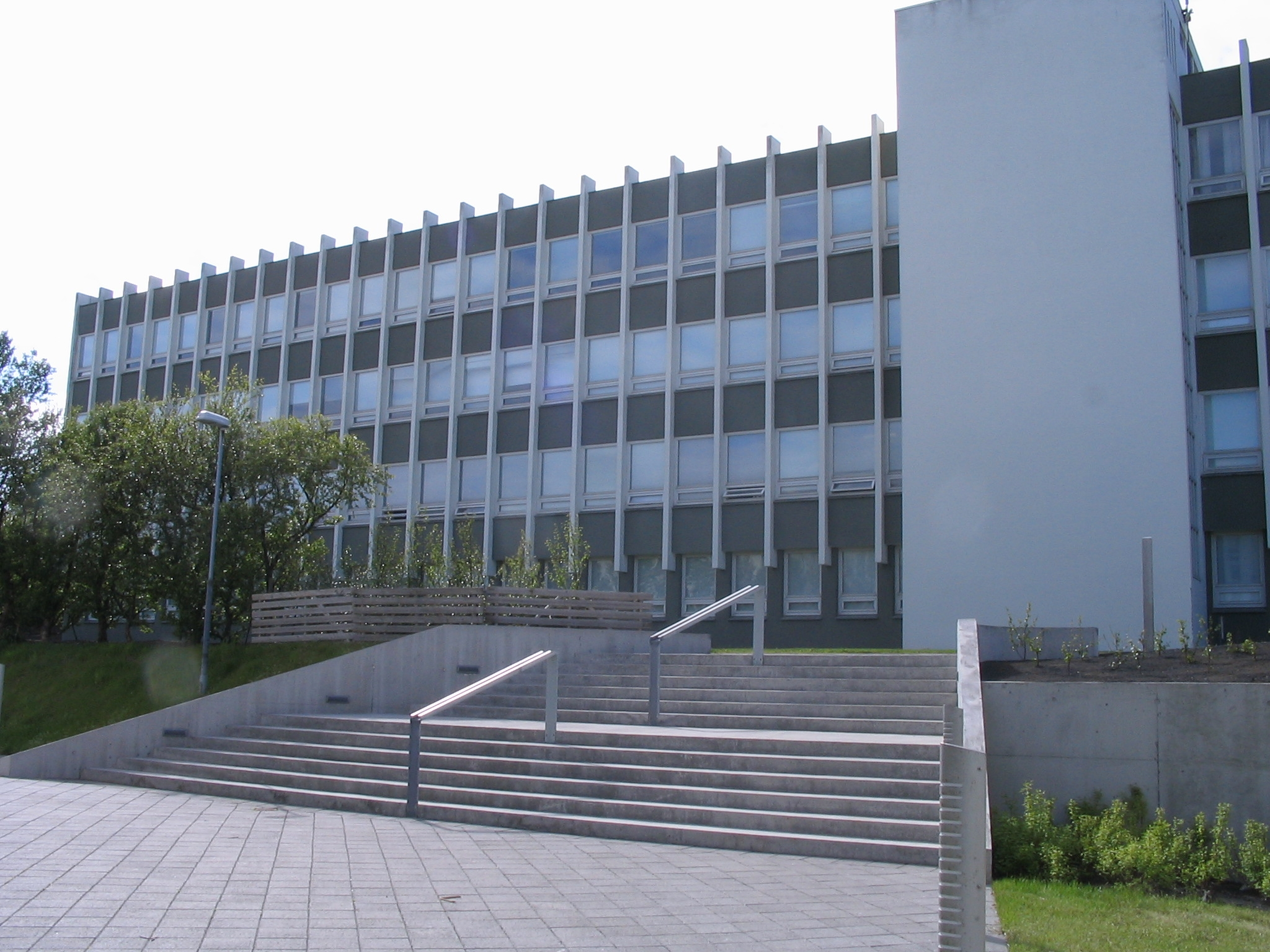
Árnagarður in 2009

Árnagarður (Icelandic pronunciation: [ˈau(r)tnaˌkarðʏr̥], lit. 'Árni's Garden') is a building in Reykjavík, Iceland, located on the campus of the University of Iceland. It is named after the 18th century scholar Árni Magnússon, and houses the Árni Magnússon Institute for Icelandic Studies.

It opened on 21 December 1969.

Most of the building is used for staff offices and classrooms, but it also houses a small cafeteria. The building is used mostly by the university's Faculty of Humanities.
