= Sigrún Aðalbjarnardóttir =

Icelandic academic

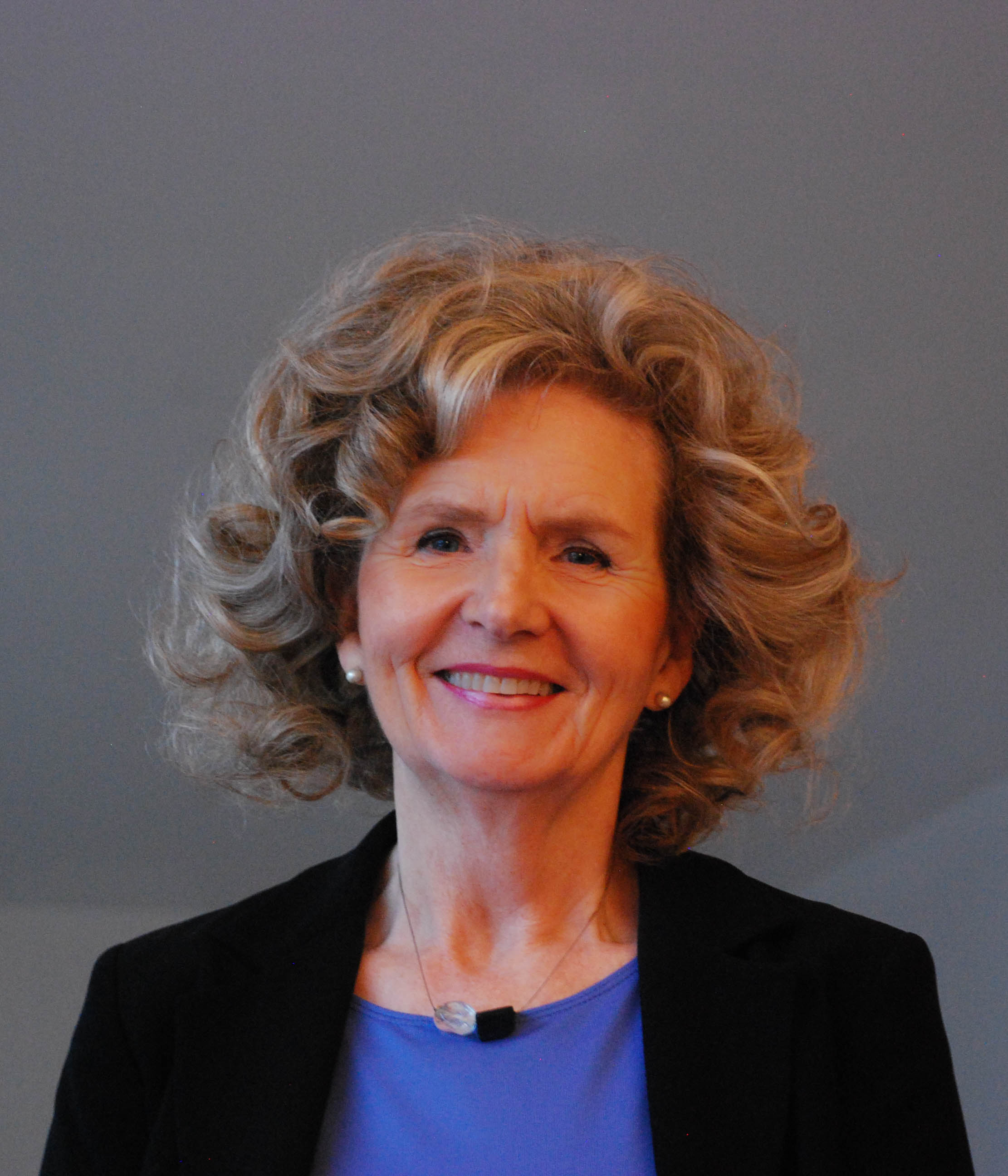
- Born: 9 July 1949 (age 76)
- Occupations: professor emeritus at the University of Iceland, School of Education

Sigrún Aðalbjarnardóttir (born 9 July 1949) is an Icelandic psychology professor. As of 2019, she is a professor emeritus at the University of Iceland, School of Education. Most of her theoretical work is within educational science and developmental psychology with a focus on the welfare of young people. Her primary interest is the social development, risk behaviour, academic engagement, and well-being of children and young people, as well as their civic awareness and engagement. A related focus is on how parents and teachers can foster the development and welfare of children and adolescents.

== Professional experience ==
Sigrún received a teacher's certificate from the Iceland College of Education in 1969. In 1983 she completed a BA in Education at the University of Iceland, in the Faculty of Social Sciences. Then, in the United States, she earned both a master's degree (1984) and a doctorate (1988) from the Harvard University Graduate School of Education in the Department of Human Development and Psychology. There she studied with professors Robert L. Selman and Lawrence Kohlberg.

From 1970 to 1976, Sigrún was an elementary school teacher in Reykjavík and in 1976–1977 in the Westman Islands. From 1973 to 1983, she designed a curriculum and course materials in social studies for elementary schools under the auspices of the Ministry of Education in the Department of School Research and Development. Professor Wolfgang Edelstein led the social studies group's revision of the curriculum. This work also entailed working with teachers and principals around the country as a part of a school-based continuing education program.

In 1989, Sigrún became an assistant professor in education at the University of Iceland, within the Faculty of Social Sciences and an associate professor the same year. She became a professor in education on 1 January 1994.

Sigrún has been a visiting scholar at Harvard's Graduate School of Education for several semesters, and a Fulbright Visiting Scholar there for one year. In addition, she was a visiting professor at the University of Fribourg, Switzerland.

== University teaching ==
Sigrún has mainly worked with university students in the field of developmental psychology, focusing on such issues as the social, ethical, and emotional development of youth, and on young people's academic engagement, risk behaviour and resilience, as well as their civic awareness and engagement. In addition, she has worked with university students in the field of teaching and curriculum development. She has supervised numerous undergraduate (BA) and graduate (MA, PhD) students in their final projects.

== Research and field work ==
Sigrún's research covers a wide range of issues within educational science and developmental psychology. Her aim as a researcher is to increase knowledge and understanding about how to support children's and youths' development and welfare at home, in school and in leisure activities. Four overlapping elements have been especially key to her research.

Sigrún's first studies focused on how elementary school children's social competence develops with age. The emphasis was on their developing capacity to coordinate different points of view as they negotiate interpersonal classroom conflicts. Then, applying that understanding, she conducted research in school-based programs to learn whether, through constructive work with students, teachers could strengthen the development of the students’ social competence and skills. This school development program, “Fostering students' social and emotional development” (Hlúð að félags- og tilfinningaþroska nemenda), entailed a year-long course for the teachers. It included working with teachers, designing curricula for students and teachers, and evaluating both the students’ and teachers’ progress.

Sigrún's second project, “Teachers' and school administrators' educational vision”, sprang out of the school development project. To strengthen teachers in their work with their students, she explored how the teachers developed in their teaching as they participated in the project and reflected on their work. Using a life story approach, she elicited their educational vision by directing attention to their values, aims, and teaching methods, as well as how they felt their life story had an impact on their educational vision. In the book Respect and Care: The Call of the 21st Century (Virðing og umhyggja: Ákall 21. aldar), Sigrún reports on this research and the school development projects that took place over several years.

Sigrún's interest in the welfare of children and youth led her to her third research project, “Young People’s Relationships, Risk taking, and Strengths: A Longitudinal Study”. In it she directs attention to how parenting styles in the earlier part of adolescence (age 14) relate to various factors of the young people's development, well-being, and behaviour up until they are in their twenties (age 22). This study focuses on their social competence, self-esteem, perceived self-control, and how they feel (anxious, depressed), along with their academic engagement (academic achievement, dropping out of school) and risk behaviour, especially substance use. In addition, she pays special attention to the interaction, over time, between these factors and the adolescents’ social competence.

Again using a life story approach, Sigrún also explores the voices of the young people in the longitudinal study as they speak about their relationships with those closest to them (parents, friends, partners) from when they were adolescents (age 16) until they were in their 30s (age 33). She also explores their experiences and attitudes toward their own and others' drug abuse. Further, she elicits their pedagogical visions (values, aims, actions) as they describe their upbringing and their relationships with their children after they had become parents in their 30s. In her book 'Young People's Life Stories: Relationships, Risk-taking, Strengths (Lífssögur ungs fólks: Samskipti, áhættuhegðun, styrkleikar) Sigrún reports on the findings of this longitudinal study.

In her fourth major research project, “Young People's Civic Awareness and Engagement in a Democratic Society” (Borgaravitund ungs fólks í lýðræðisþjóðfélagi) her aim is to gain more knowledge and understanding of young people's civic awareness in both elementary and secondary schools. In the study the young people are given voice as, for example, they explore their ideas about democracy and their attitudes towards human rights, especially those of women and immigrants, and also as they describe the impacts they want to have on society.

Sigrún has organised this research with her collaborators in Iceland at the research centre Challenges Facing Children and Young People. She has also worked with Professor Robert L. Selman and his research team at the Harvard's Graduate School of Education and with scholars in the European network project, Children's Identity and Citizenship in Europe (CiCe).

== Other work and projects ==
Sigrún has served in various positions at the University of Iceland. For example, she chaired both the Science Committee of the University Council and the Science Committee of State Universities. Under the auspices of the Faculty of Social Sciences she was on the Board of Directors of the Social Sciences Institute and also chaired the Faculty's Science Committee.

Under the auspices of the Ministry of Education, she sat on a committee to develop a parliamentary bill for public support of scientific research. She was also on the Board of Directors of the Icelandic Research Fund (Icelandic Centre for Research). And, under the auspices of the Ministry of Education, she served in a working group on fundamental factors for education in Iceland; the emphasis was on the factors of democracy and human rights.

Along with her collaborators, Sigrún has founded a variety of graduate programs in educational science at the university; examples are the program Psychology in Educational Science and the program Parent Education which was founded in collaboration with the University of Minnesota in the United States. She has also worked on school-based continuing education for teachers and principals.

== Honours ==
Sigrún has received several acknowledgements for her academic work, including one from the University of Iceland in 2004 for her “contribution to research”. In 2005 “The Together Group” recognised her for her “good theoretical work and useful research for the benefit of parents and children”. The group is an association of many municipalities, associations and institutions that work together to enhance the welfare of children and adolescents. In addition, in 2012 she received the Icelandic Order of the Falcon Cross for her contribution to Educational Science.

== Personal life ==
Sigrún is married to Þórólfur Ólafsson, a dentist. They have two sons, Aðalbjörn and Þórólfur Rúnar and three grandchildren.

== Selected main written works ==
=== Books ===
- Adalbjarnardottir, S. (2019). Lífssögur ungs fólks – Samskipti, áhættuhegðun, styrkleikar [Young people's life stories – Relationships, risk-taking behavior, strengths]. Reykjavík: Haskolautgafan.
- Adalbjarnardottir, S. (2011). Borgaravitund ungs fólks í lýðræðisþjóðfélagi [Young people's civic awareness and engagement in a democratic society]. Reykjavík: Rannsóknasetrið Lífshættir barna og ungmenna - Félagsvísindastofnun og Menntavísindastofnun Háskóla Íslands.
- Adalbjarnardottir, S. (2007). Virðing og umhyggja – Ákall 21. aldar [Respect and care – The call of the 21st century] . Reykjavík: Heimskringla, Haskólaforlag Máls og menningar.
- Adalbjarnardottir, S., Dorfadóttir, A.G., Thorolfsson, Th.R., & Gardarsdottir, K.L. (2003). Vímuefnaneysla og viðhorf - Ungu fólki í Reykjavík fylgt eftir frá 14 ára til 22 ára aldurs [Substance use and attitudes – Following young people in Reykjavík from age 14 to 22]. Reykjavík: Félagsvísindastofnun og Háskólaútgáfan.

=== Articles ===
- Adalbjarnardottir, S. (2015). Ákall og áskoranir: Vegsemd og virðing í skólastarfi [Challenges and Opportunities for Schools: Respect and Professionalism]. Netla - Veftímarit um uppeldi og menntun [Netla – Online Journal on Pedagogy and Education].
- Blondal, K. S., & Adalbjarnardottir, S. (2014). Parenting in relation to school dropout through student engagement: A longitudinal study. Journal of Marriage and Family, 76, 778–795.
- Adalbjarnardottir, S. (2002). Adolescent psychosocial maturity and alcohol use: Quantitative and qualitative analysis of longitudinal data. Adolescence, 37, 19–53.
- Adalbjarnardottir, S. & Hafsteinsson, L.G. (2001). Parenting styles and adolescent substance use: A longitudinal study. Journal of Research on Adolesence, 11, 401–423.
- Blondal, K. S., & Adalbjarnardottir, S. (2014). Parenting in relation to school dropout through student engagement: A longitudinal study. Journal of Marriage and Family, 76, 778–795.
- Gestsdottir, S., Geldhof, J., Paus, T., Freund, A.M., Adalbjarnardottir, S, Lerner, J.V., & Lerner, R.M. (2015). Self-regulation processes among youth in four western cultures: Is there an adolescent-specific structure of the Selection-Optimization-Compensation (SOC) model? International Journal of Behavioral Development, 39(4) 346–358.
- Gudjohnsen, R. Th. & Adalbjarnardottir, S. (2017). Viðhorf ungs fólks til pólitískrar þátttöku [Young peoples’ views on political participation] Stjórnmál & stjórnsýsla [Icelandic Review of Politics and Administration], 13(2), 287–310.
