= University of Iceland Main Building =

Coordinates: 64°08′26″N 21°56′58″W

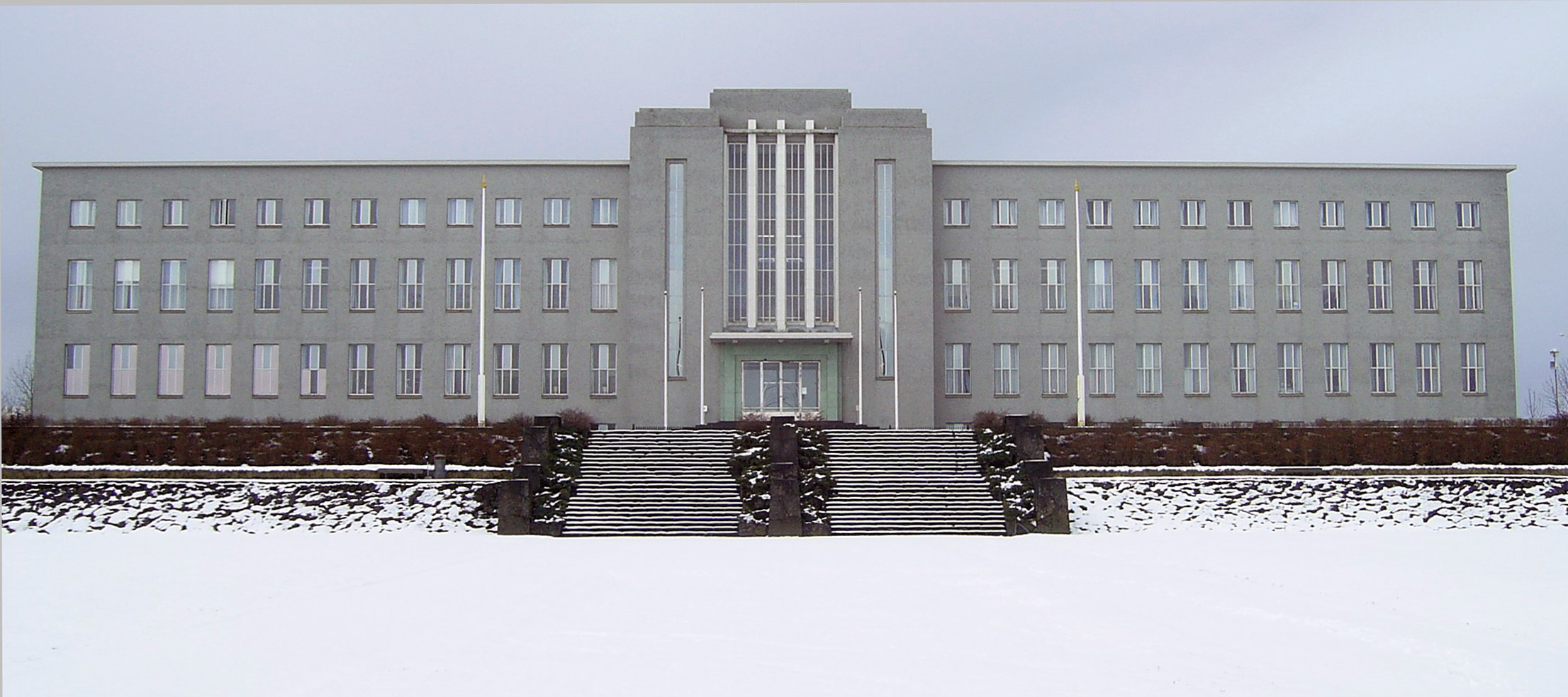
A view of the building in winter

The University of Iceland Main Building (Icelandic: Aðalbygging Háskóla Íslands [ˈaːðalˌpɪcciŋk ˈhauːˌskouːla ˈistlan(t)s]) is the central building of the University of Iceland campus on Suðurgata in Reykjavík, Iceland. It was designed by Icelandic state architect Guðjón Samúelsson and its construction was completed in 1940. Today, the building is one of the more noticeable landmarks in Reykjavík.

The University of Iceland Main Building houses the university administration and partially houses the faculty of humanities.
