= Sigrún Klara Hannesdóttir =

Icelandic academic

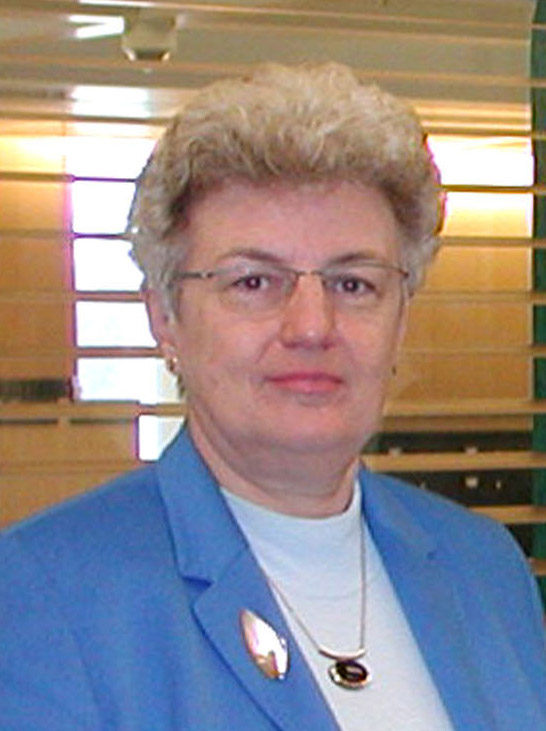
- Born: 1943 (age 82–83)
- Occupations: Professor emerita in information science at the University of Iceland and former national librarian, director of the National and University Library of Iceland

Sigrún Klara Hannesdóttir (born 1943) is a professor emerita in information science at the University of Iceland and former National Librarian, Director of the National and University Library of Iceland.

== Studies and work ==
Sigrún Klara completed a BA in English, Icelandic, and library science from the University of Iceland in 1967, an MSLS in Library Science and Information Theory from Wayne State University, Detroit, Michigan, in 1968 and studied in the United States on a Fulbright grant. She was the first Icelander to complete a doctorate in Library Science and Information Science from the University of Chicago in 1987.

Sigrún Klara worked as a reference librarian in Kresge Library at Oakland University, Rochester, Michigan from 1967 to 1968. She then went to Peru in South America. There she worked for the Bank of International Development as a consultant for the university in Trujillo, Peru. From 1971 to 1975 Sigrún Klara was a school library director of the City of Reykjavik and supervised the setting up of school libraries for the city. She also taught part-time in library science at the University of Iceland. From 1975 to 1998, Sigrún Klara was an assistant professor, associate professor and then full professor at the Department of Social Sciences. She became the first woman professor in the department. For years she directed the teaching of library and information science. From 1998 to 2002 she was the director of NORDINFO, (Nordisk institut för vetenskaplig information) in Helsinki, Finland, which supervised development projects in the field of scientific information and its dissemination in the Nordic countries, the Baltic countries and western Russia. From 2002 to 2007, she was the National Librarian, Director of the National and University Library of Iceland. She was thereby the first woman to serve in this position.

Sigrún Klara has lectured in many parts of the world on the future of the information society, knowledge management, school libraries and information literacy, education of librarians and the role of university and research libraries in the global virtual library. She directed radio programmes about authors and children's books 1987–1990 and wrote reviews on children's books in Morgunblaðið 1975–2000. Sigrún Klara is a certified translator into and from English.

== Research ==
Sigrún Klara's research was first related to availability to scientific information to the scientific community. Her doctoral dissertation discussed cooperation between university libraries and national libraries across national borders mainly among the Nordic countries and how this cooperation is affected by cooperation policies in other fields of society. Other research subjects have related to school libraries, their development, and the education of school librarians, publication of children's books and children's reading, as well as research on how the Icelandic Christmas gift tradition affects directly Icelandic children's availability to books in their mother tongue. She took part in international research on ethics in libraries and how librarians need to pursue the golden middle road between disseminating information without limits and being aware that the information provided can be damaging. Sigrún Klara has written about 300 articles in domestic and foreign journals about knowledge management, the information society, electronic libraries, school libraries, bibliographic control, UAP Universal Availability to Publications. the ethics of information professionals, children's literature, children's reading and accessibility to reading materials, etc. In recent years, she has researched the history of women from Seyðisfjörður (E-Iceland) and written dozen articles about women for Glettingur Magazine.

== Other work and projects ==
Sigrún Klara has served in many professional committees for the University of Iceland, for the Ministry of Education, Science and Culture, and working committees in other countries. She was one of the founders of the Professional Librarians' Association in Iceland (Félag bókasafnsfræðinga), one of the founders of Skólavarðan, an association on school libraries, and chaired the association from 1989 to 1992. She was on the first international committee of school libraries within the International Federation of Library Associations and Institutions (IFLA) from 1976 to 1997, on the board of directors of the International Association of School Librarianship (IASL) for years and the president of the association from 1995 to 1998. She was a founding member of Delta Kappa Gamma Society International in Iceland in 1975, and Europe Regional Director for that Society 2002–2004.

=== Friends of Peru ===
Sigrún Klara operates Friends of Peru, a philanthropic association that supports schools in impoverished districts in Peru, especially in the Andes Mountains. Friends of Peru now supports a small village, called Cancha Cancha. Its elevation is 4000 m. The association previously established a school library in Quebrada Verde and bought books and computers for other schools such as Chosecani and set up several school kitchens where children can get hot meals every day.

== Acknowledgements ==
- Anglia Scholarship in 1965 for study in England.
- Fulbright Scholarship from 1967 to 1968.
- UNESCO Scholarship for a doctoral study from 1977 to 1978.
- Delta Kappa Gamma Scholarship for a doctoral study in 1985.
- The Icelandic Order of the Falcon, on 1 January 2003 for her contribution to library and information science.
- Honorary member of the Professional Librarians' Association (Iceland) 2007, Distinguished Alumna Award from Wayne State University 2009.
- Delta Kappa Gamma Honorary Award in Iceland in 2015, European Achievement Award of Delta Kappa Gamma in 2013, the Delta Kappa Gamma International Achievement Award in 2013, DKG highest recognition.

== Personal life ==
Parents: Hannes Jónsson, manual worker in Seyðisfjörður (1905–1982) and Sigríður Jóhannesdóttir (1907–2012). Sigrún Klara was married to Indriði Hallgrímsson (1944–1979), librarian. Their son is Hallgrímur Indriðason, journalist. He is married and has two daughters.

== Main written works ==
- The Scandia Plan. Cooperative Acquisition Scheme for Improving Access to Research Publications in Four Nordic Countries. Metuchen: Scarecrow Press, 1992. 340 s.
- "Human resources training and deployment: Competencies needed in school library personnel". In: Voices from Around the World. Selections from the Annual Proceedings of the International Association of School Librarianship. Ed. by Philomena Hauck. Metuchen: The Scarecrow Press, 1989, pp. 249–253.
- Sigrún Klara Hannesdóttir. (1995). Samviskuspurningar með siðfræðilegu ívafi. Bókasafnið, 19(1), 52–58.
- From books to the information superhighway: Young people's reading habits and Internet use in Iceland. In: Education for all: Culture, Reading and Information. Ed. by Snunith Shoham and Moshe Yitzhaki. Proceedings of the 27th International Conference of the International Association of School Librarianship. Ramat Gan: International Association of School Librarianship, 1998, pp. 55–68.
- Children's literature as the basis for cultural identity: The Case of Iceland. In: Text, Culture and National Identity is Children's Literature: International Seminar on Children's Literature: Pure and Applied. University College Worcester, England. 14–19 June 1999. Edited by Dr. Jean Webb. Helsinki: NORDINFO, 2000, pp. 209–223.
- NORDINFO: Supporting the electronic research library development through international cooperation. In: Knowledge, Information and Democracy in the Open Society: the Role of the Library and Information Sector. Proceedings. 9th International BOBCATSSS Symposium on Library and Information Science. Vilnius University, Vilnius, 29–31 January 2001, pp. 451–460.
