= Gamli Garður =

Student housing at the University of Iceland

Coordinates: 64°08′29″N 21°56′47″W

Gamli Garður (before addition of new annexes)

Gamli Garður (lit. Old Dormitory) is a dormitory at Iceland's Háskóli Íslands (University of Iceland), first opened in 1934. It is Iceland's oldest residence hall and the oldest building still standing on campus and contains 44 rooms (typically 12 m²). In 2021, a new annex to the building opened with 69 rooms. International students reside at the dormitory for the duration of their stay. The dormitory currently serves as a hostel during the summer (early June to mid-August).
