= University of Iceland VR =

Coordinates: 64°08′20″N 21°57′16″W

The VR buildings are a part of the campus of the University of Iceland. VR is short for Verkfræði og Raunvísindi (English: Engineering and Natural Science)

The buildings were constructed in the 1970s and (as the name implies) serve as centres for studies in engineering and natural science at the University of Iceland. VR I houses the experimental labs while VR II houses lecture halls and classrooms. Research is mainly conducted in VR III. A one-story annex of VR I, known as Letigarður (lazy house) accommodates an intellectual retreat for chemistry, physics and mathematics students. This was closed in 2011 due to health and safety hazards.

University of Iceland VR buildings

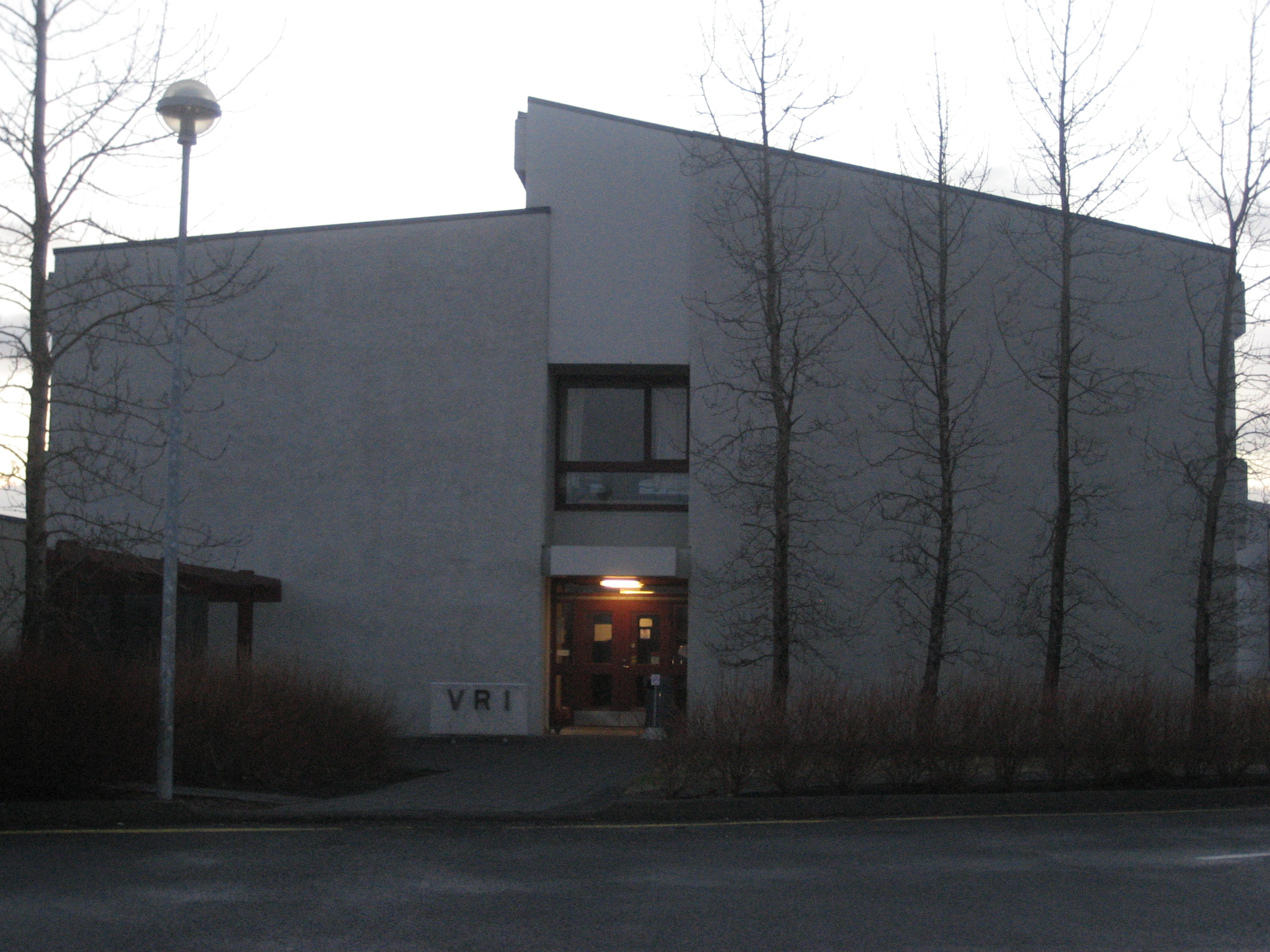
VR I

VR II

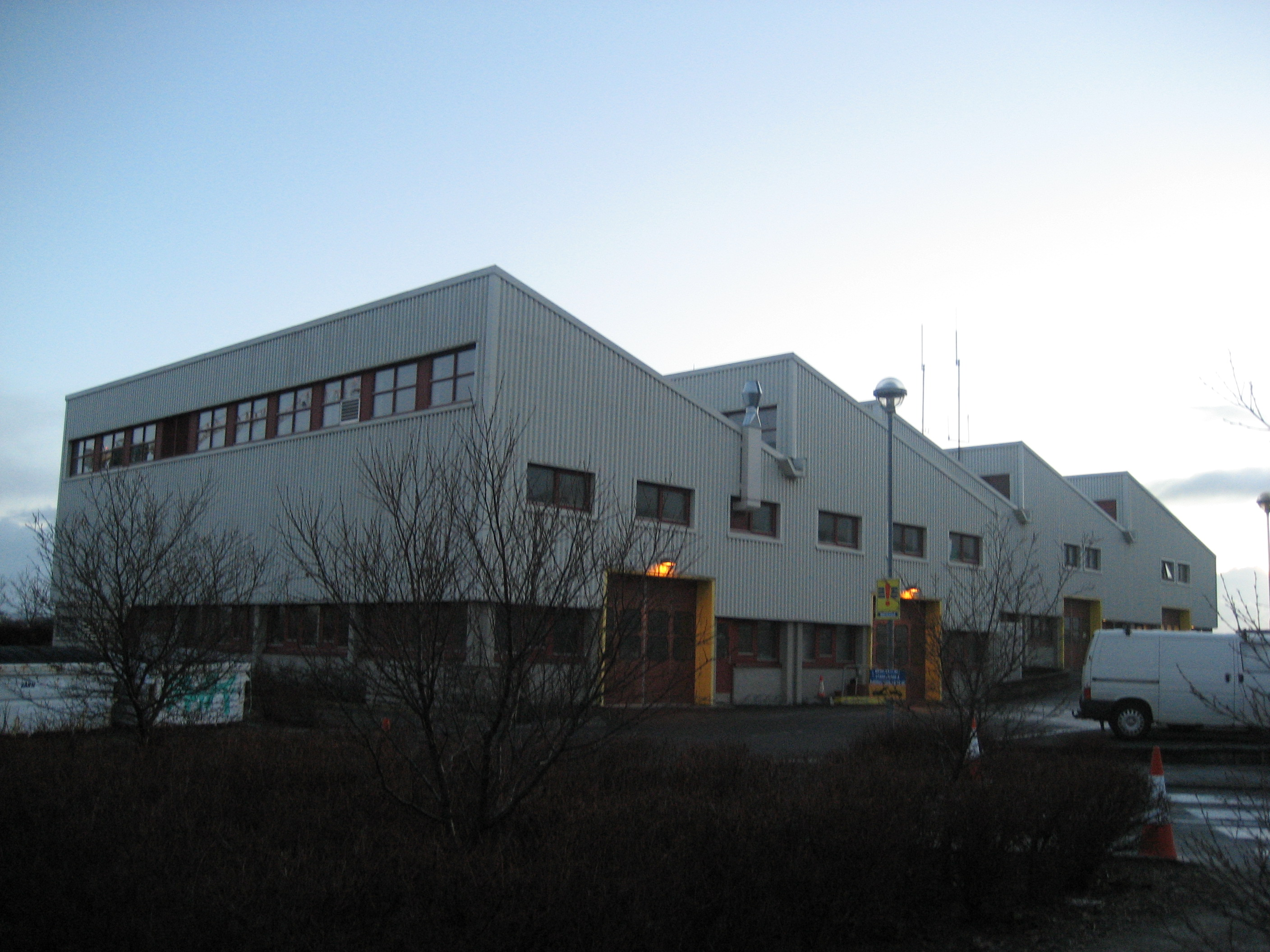
VR III
