= Silja Bára Ómarsdóttir =

Icelandic political scientist and international relations scholar

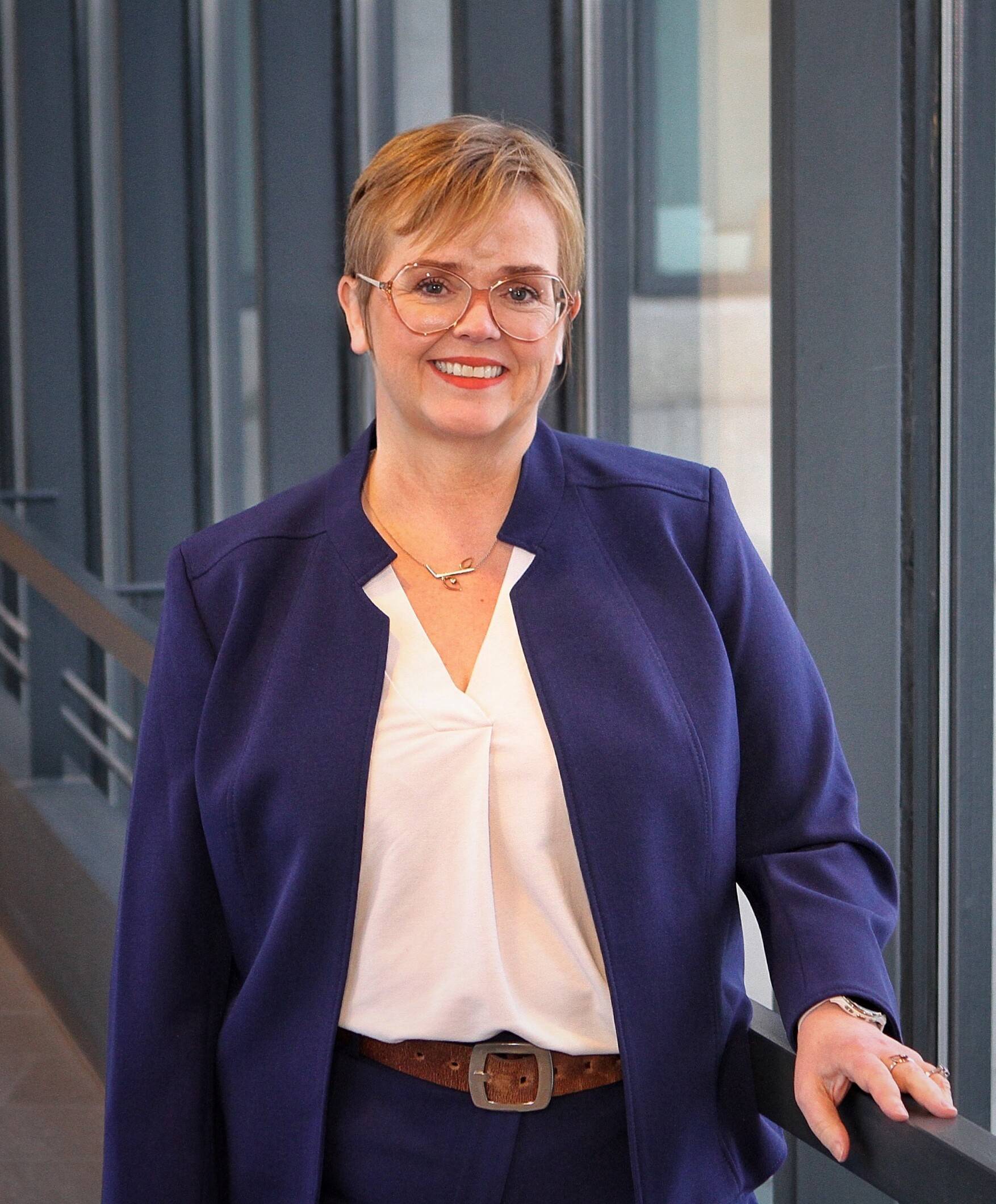
- Silja Bára – Rector of the University of Iceland
- Born: April 23, 1971 (age 55); Reykjavík, Iceland
- Title: Rector of the University of Iceland

Academic background
- Education: Lewis & Clark College (BA); University of Southern California (MA); University College Cork (PhD)
- Thesis: The security imaginaries of an unarmed people: popular and elite security discourses in Iceland (2018)

Academic work
- Discipline: International relations, political science, feminist security studies
- Institutions: University of Iceland
- Website: University of Iceland profile

Silja Bára Ómarsdóttir (born 23 April 1971) is an Icelandic political scientist and professor of international relations who has served as the rector of the University of Iceland since July 1, 2025. Her research focuses on Icelandic foreign and security policy, Arctic politics, and gender and security studies. She is recognised for her academic leadership, public service, and advocacy on human rights and gender equality as well as her work in the Icelandic Constitutional Assembly.

She was born in Ólafsfjörður, Iceland in 1971. She has a PhD from University College Cork, Ireland.

== Early life and education ==
Silja Bára spent her early years in Ólafsfjörður and Reykjavík. She graduated from Menntaskólinn við Hamrahlíð in 1990. She received a BA in international relations from Lewis & Clark College (1995), an MA in international relations from the University of Southern California (1998), and a PhD in political science from University College Cork (2018). Her doctoral thesis was awarded the dissertation prize by the Political Studies Association of Ireland.

== Academic career ==
Silja Bára joined the University of Iceland in 2005, where she progressed from lecturer to professor of international relations. From 2006 to 2008, she was director of the Institute of International Affairs at the university. Since 2023, she has served as co-editor-in-chief of Scandinavian Political Studies. She has also contributed to the editorial boards of journals such as Cooperation and Conflict and Stjórnmál og stjórnsýsla (Icelandic Review of Politics and Administration).

Her teaching and supervision spans international relations theory, Icelandic foreign policy, gender and security studies, and Arctic affairs. She has supervised over 250 students at BA, MA, and PhD levels and received the Jón Sigurðsson Award for excellence in teaching at the University of Iceland in 2019.

== Research ==
Ómarsdóttir's research lies at the intersection of international relations, gender studies, and Nordic politics. Her primary areas of expertise include:

- Icelandic foreign and security policy, with emphasis on neutrality, NATO membership, and post-Cold War strategic culture.
- Arctic politics, including Iceland’s role and interests in Arctic governance.
- Gender, security, and peace studies, including work on gendered discourses in foreign policy and the security implications of gender equality.

She has been a Fulbright Arctic Initiative scholar and is regularly invited to speak on issues relating to security, gender, and Arctic governance at international conferences.

== Public service ==
Silja Bára was elected to Iceland’s Constitutional Assembly in 2010, where she contributed to proposals for a revised national constitution. She chaired the Icelandic Equal Rights Council from 2019 to 2021. Since 2018, she has served on the board of the Icelandic Red Cross and became its chair in 2022. She is frequently consulted by Icelandic media and governmental bodies on issues related to international affairs, security, and equality.

== Rector of the University of Iceland ==
On 27 March 2025, Ómarsdóttir was elected rector of the University of Iceland, winning 50.7% of the vote in the second round. She is the second woman in history to hold this office. She assumed office formally on the 1st of July and took over from Jón Atli Benediktsson.
