= Sigrún Stefánsdóttir =

Sigrún Stefánsdóttir (born 1947) was the head of radio and television of RÚV, the National Icelandic Broadcasting Service. She is a former university teacher and news reporter.
