= University of Iceland =

Public research university in Reykjavík, Iceland

Coordinates: 64°08′26″N 21°56′58″W

- Háskóli Íslands
- Latin: Universitas Islandiae
- Type: Public
- Established: 1911
- Affiliations: EUA, UNICA, Aurora, UArctic
- Rector: Silja Bára Ómarsdóttir
- Faculty: 621
- Administrative staff: 1,219
- Students: 14,167 (2023)
- Undergraduates: 8,589 (2023)
- Postgraduates: 2,123 (2023)
- Location: Reykjavík, Iceland
- Campus: Urban, suburban
- Colors: Blue
- Nickname: HÍ
- Mascot: Athena
- Website: english.hi.is

The University of Iceland (Icelandic: Háskóli Íslands [ˈhauːˌskouːlɪ ˈistlan(t)s]) is a public research university in Reykjavík, Iceland, and the country's oldest and largest institution of higher education. Founded in 1911, it has grown steadily from a small civil servants' school to a modern comprehensive university, providing instruction for about 14,000 students in twenty-five faculties. Teaching and research is conducted in social sciences, humanities, law, medicine, natural sciences, engineering and teacher education. It has a campus concentrated around Suðurgata, a street in central Reykjavík, with additional facilities located in nearby areas as well as in the countryside.

== History ==
The University of Iceland was founded by the Alþingi on 17 June 1911, uniting three former post-secondary institutions: Prestaskólinn, Læknaskólinn and Lagaskólinn, which taught theology, medicine and law, respectively. The university originally had only faculties for these three fields, in addition to a faculty of humanities. During its first year of operation, 45 students were enrolled. The first rector of the university was Björn M. Ólsen, a professor in the faculty of humanities.

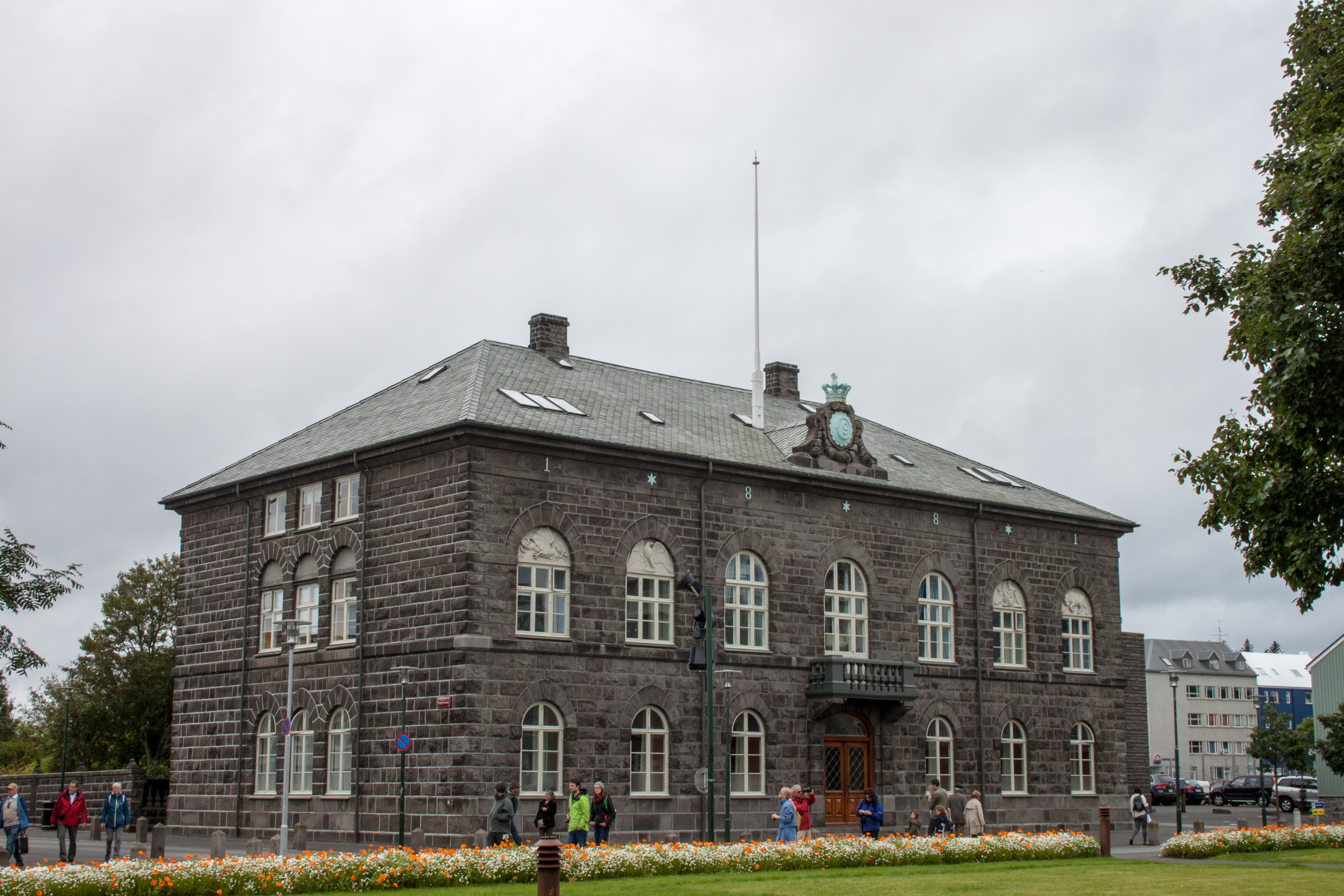
Alþingishúsið in Reykjavík, where the university was housed during its first 29 years

The university played an important role in the construction of the Icelandic nation-state and was perceived by Icelanders as an important stepping stone towards full independence. Demands for a national Icelandic university stretch as far back as to the first session of the elected assembly of Alþingi in 1845. Icelandic nationalist leaders petitioned Denmark at the time to create a "national school" to achieve cultural and material progress, but also to make sure that the education that Icelanders obtained was sufficiently national in character.

For its first 29 years, the university was housed in the Icelandic Parliament building, Alþingishúsið, in central Reykjavík. In 1933, the university received a special licence from Alþingi to operate a cash-prize lottery called Happdrætti Háskólans. The university lottery, which started in 1934, remains a major source of funding for the construction of new university buildings. In 1940, the university moved into the main building, designed by Icelandic state architect Guðjón Samúelsson. The main building forms the core of the university campus on Suðurgata, where most of the principal buildings of the university are located today.

In recent years, there has been some major restructuring. In 2008, the university was divided into five different schools. Simultaneously, the Iceland University of Education was merged with the University of Iceland to become its School of Education. Increased competition from local colleges has encouraged the university to greatly improve its marketing strategies, which had previously been deemed unnecessary.

On 21 January 2021, a broken main water pipe serving the Vesturbær neighbourhood of Reykjavík flooded the campus with over 2,000 tonnes (4.4 million pounds) of water, causing damage to buildings Háskólatorg and Gimli.

== Campus ==
=== School buildings ===
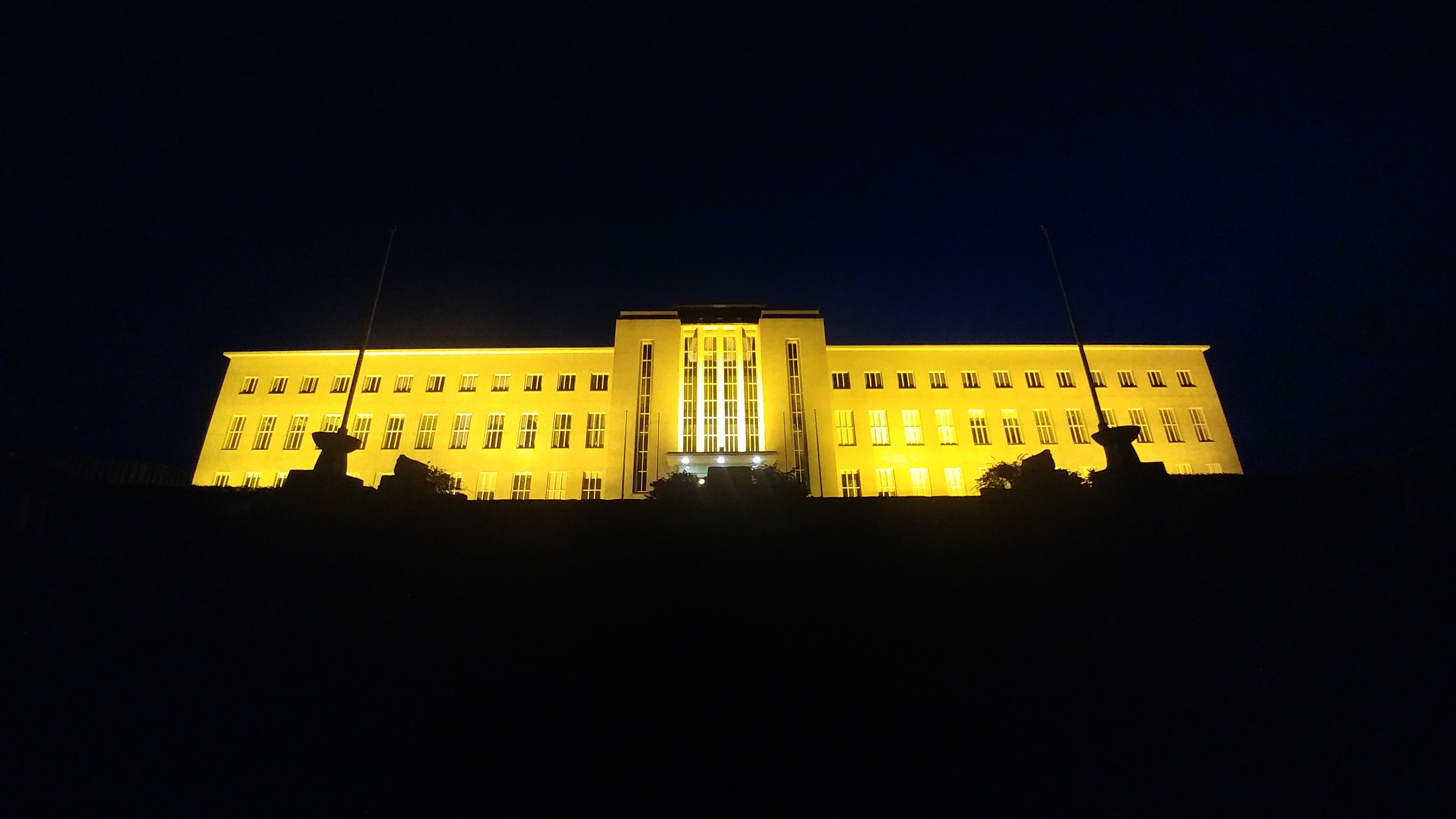
The main building at summer midnight

The university's main campus lies immediately south-west of Tjörnin lake in the centre of Reykjavík. It covers about 10 hectares (25 acres) in total. There are around 30 buildings in total, the oldest of which, Gamli Garður, was built in 1934. The Main Building overlooks a semi-circular lawn, featuring a statue of Sæmundur fróði. In 2007, a new service centre was opened next to the main building and many of the most vital service desks were relocated there. Some lectures take place in Háskólabíó cinema at the northern end of the campus. There are also a gym, several dormitories, and smaller research institute buildings on the grounds. Most buildings are located on the main campus and nearby neighbourhoods. The Faculty of Sport, Leisure Studies and Social Education, on the other hand, is located in the village of Laugarvatn.

=== Library ===
In 1994, the university library (formally established in 1940) merged with the national library of Iceland, Landsbókasafn Íslands (est. 1818) to form one large academic library, the National and University Library of Iceland (Icelandic: Landsbókasafn Íslands – Háskólabókasafn). The library main building, Þjóðarbókhlaðan, is situated next to the main campus.

=== Hospital ===
Education and research at the University of Iceland are closely tied with the National University Hospital in Reykjavík. The facilities of the School of Health Sciences are therefore largely located on the hospital grounds.

== Organisation ==
=== Administration ===
The University Council is the highest administrative authority within the institution and consists of the Rector and ten other members, including two students and two members endorsed by the University Forum. The University Forum consists of the Rector, faculty heads and various domestic representatives. It does not have any executive powers but works with the Council on the overall strategy of the university. The five academic schools and their faculties are headed by deans and have much control over curricula and day-to-day administration.

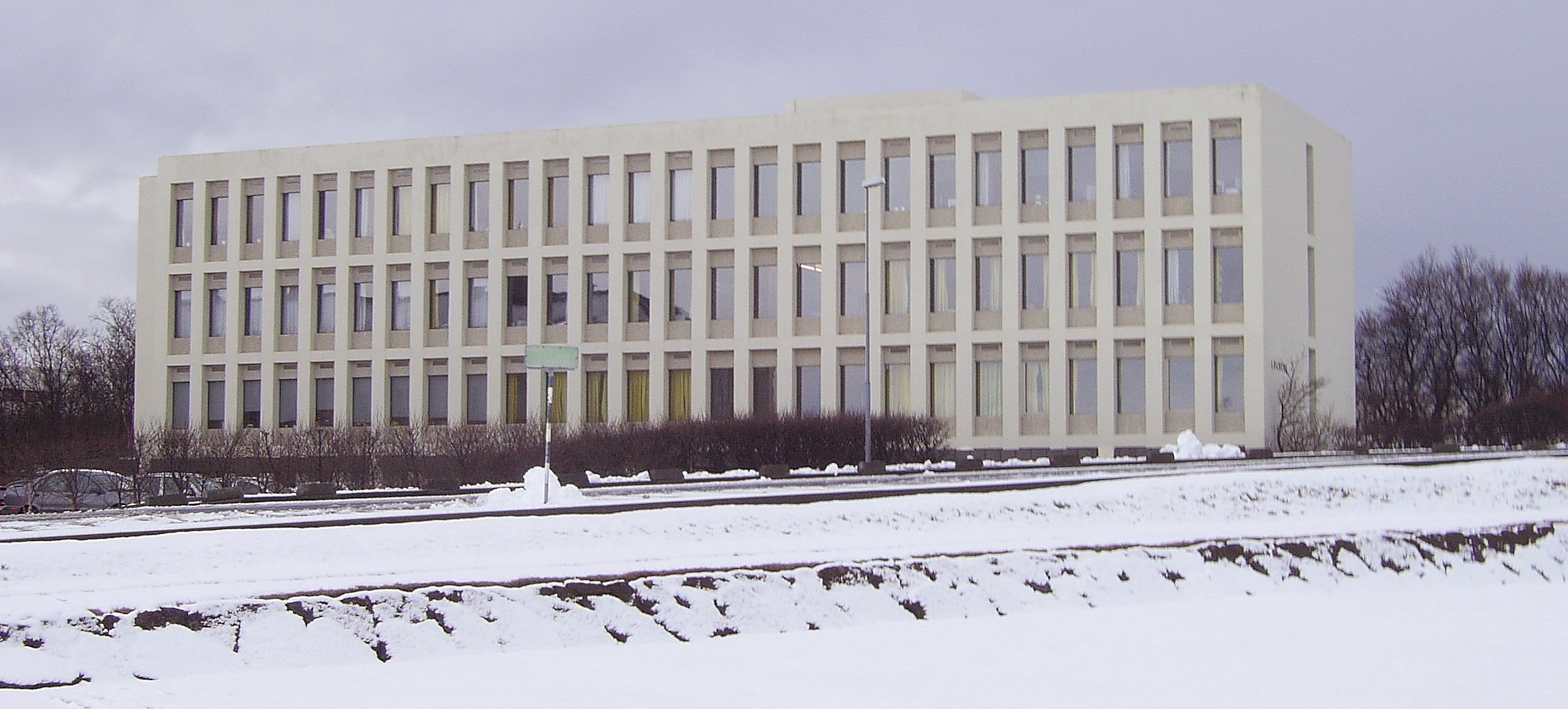
Lögberg, home to the Faculty of Law

Silja Bára Ómarsdóttir has served as Rector of the University of Iceland since 2025, succeeding Jón Atli Benediktsson.

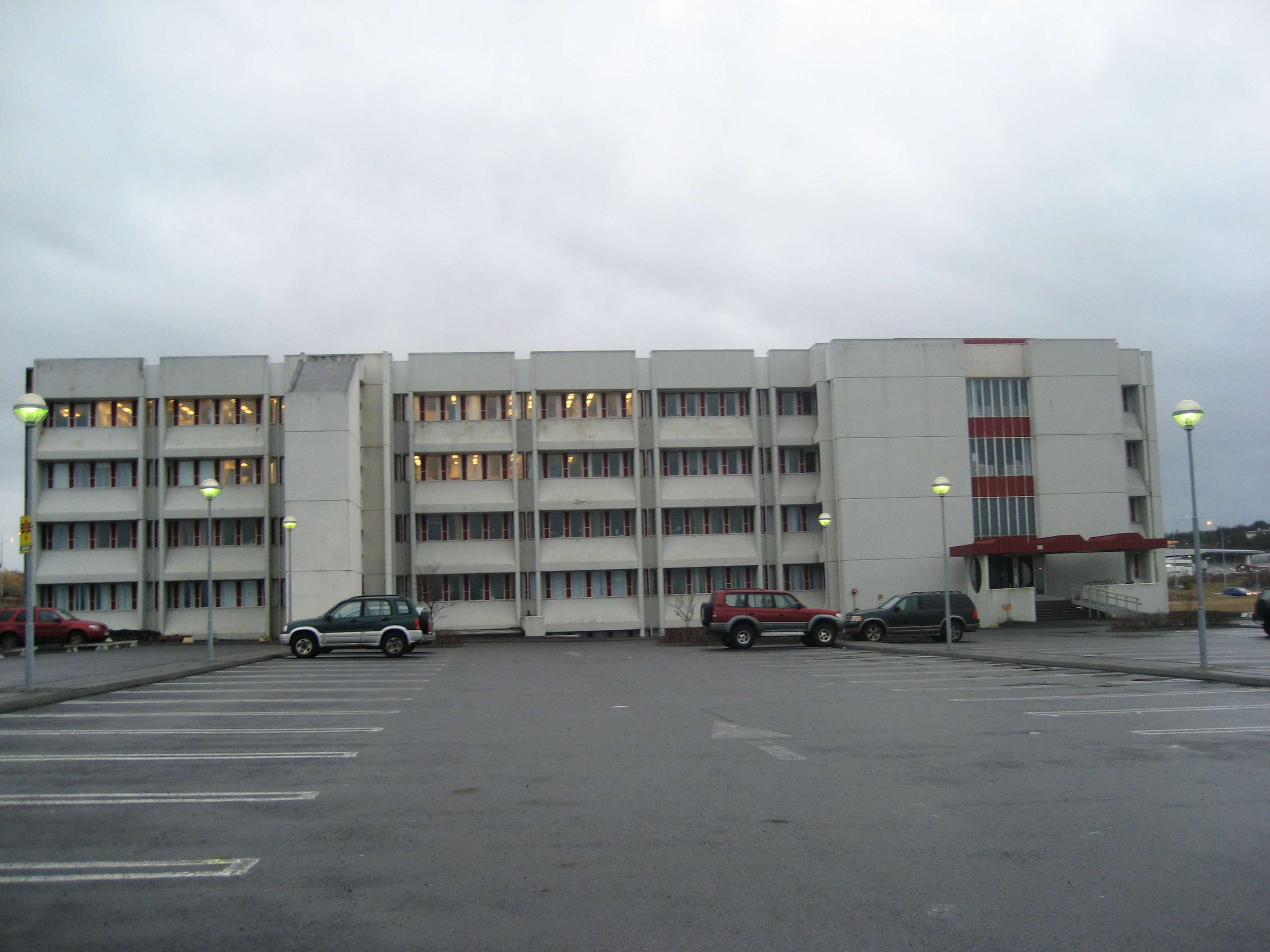
Læknagarður, which houses the Faculty of Medicine

=== Schools and faculties ===
The University of Iceland is divided into five schools (svið) which are further divided into a total of twenty-five faculties (deildir). Prior to 2008, it was divided into eleven faculties which were then divided into departments (skorir). As of fall 2025, the School of Social Sciences was the largest, with around 3,500 students, followed by the School of Health Sciences with around 2,700. The remaining four schools each had between 1,900–2,600 students. At that time, 231 exchange students from other schools were also enrolled. The university also operates a continuing education centre.

VR-II, the principal location of the School of Engineering and Natural Sciences

The university consists of the following schools and faculties:

School of Social Sciences

- Faculty of Business Administration
- Faculty of Economics
- Faculty of Law
- Faculty of Social Sciences
- Faculty of Social Work
- Faculty of Political Science

School of Health Sciences

- Faculty of Medicine
- Faculty of Nursing
- Faculty of Odontology
- Faculty of Pharmacology
- Faculty of Food Science and Nutrition
- Faculty of Psychology

School of Humanities

- Faculty of Theology and Religious Studies
- Faculty of Languages and Cultures
- Faculty of Icelandic and Comparative Cultural Studies
- Faculty of History and Philosophy

School of Education

- Faculty of Sport, Leisure Studies and Social Education
- Faculty of Teacher Education
- Faculty of Educational Studies

School of Engineering and Natural Sciences

- Faculty of Industrial and mechanical engineering and computer science
- Faculty of Earth Sciences
- Faculty of Life and environmental sciences
- Faculty of Electrical and computer engineering
- Faculty of Physical sciences
- Faculty of Civil and Environmental Engineering

=== Institutes ===
There are over sixty research institutes and seven rural research stations run by the university. Some of the most notable are:

- Árni Magnússon Institute for Icelandic Studies
- Institute of Earth Sciences (includes the Nordic Volcanological Centre)
- Keldur – Institute for Experimental Pathology
- Social Science Research Institute
- Vigdís Finnbogadóttir Institute of Foreign Languages (a UNESCO category 2 institute)

== Academics ==
In addition to the major faculties, there are numerous research institutes attached to the university. With more than 700 tenured teachers, over 2,000 non-tenured teachers and about 300 researchers and administrators, the University of Iceland is the largest single work-place in Iceland.

Some of the resources available at the university are uniquely Icelandic; these include the manuscripts preserved in the Árni Magnússon Institute for Icelandic Studies, Icelandic census records dating from 1703, exceptionally complete genealogical data and climatological, glaciological, seismic and geothermal records.

=== Education ===
The University of Iceland offers studies in more than 160 undergraduate programmes in the humanities, science and social sciences and in professional fields such as theology, law, business, medicine, odontology, nursing, pharmacology and engineering. Postgraduate studies are offered by all faculties, most of them research-based although not exclusively. There are also several multidisciplinary master's programmes available in the fields of health and environmental sciences, some of them in cooperation with other European universities.

The principal language of instruction is Icelandic. Textbooks are mainly in English and Icelandic. Most departments offer courses in English and allow foreign students to take their examinations in English. Icelandic language, medieval studies and environmental sciences are some of the university's strongest specialties, owing to Iceland's unique literary heritage and nature. A growing number of English-taught programmes are offered in these fields and others, attracting a large number of foreign students.

=== International collaboration ===
The university is an active member of the University of the Arctic. UArctic is an international cooperative network based in the Circumpolar Arctic region, consisting of more than 200 universities, colleges, and other organizations with an interest in promoting education and research in the Arctic region.

The university participates in UArctic's mobility program north2north. The aim of that program is to enable students of member institutions to study in different parts of the North.

=== Rankings ===
University rankings

Global – Overall
- ARWU World: 601–700 (2023)
- QS World: =582 (2026)
- THE World: 501–600 (2024)
- USNWR Global: =452 (2023)

In 2011, Times Higher Education included the University of Iceland for the first time, placing it in the 276-300 band globally. The following year it had risen to the 251-275 band on the same list. The 2017 edition of Academic Ranking of World Universities (ARWU) placed it in the 401-500 band globally.

== Student life ==
=== Student funding ===
The University of Iceland is a public, government-funded university and as such it does not charge tuition (although an enrollment fee of 75,000 króna must be paid). In terms of living expenses, most students at the University of Iceland either work part-time to finance their studies or receive student loans at favourable interest rates from the Icelandic Student Loan Fund.

The Icelandic Ministry of Education, Science and Culture annually offers awards to foreign students for the study of Icelandic language, history and literature at the University of Iceland. Scholarships are usually restricted to students from selected countries each year. Awards are tenable for one academic year and aim to cover board and lodging.

The major source of funding available to foreign graduate students is the Eimskipafélag Íslands University Fund, which is open to both scholars and current or prospective PhD students. Each grant from the fund is approximately 2.5 million ISK per year, for a period of up to three years and is intended to cover living expenses.

=== Student politics, unions and services ===
The Students' Council is the official representative of those studying at the university. It handles all kinds of rights issues and relations with internal and external authorities. Elections for the council take place every year. There are three major parties that participate in the student politics. These are Vaka and Röskva. Many local politicians started their careers as members of the council.

There are over 60 student unions in operation within the university. Each union is made up of students of a particular subject or a few related ones. Postgraduate students in some fields have their own unions. Membership is optional. A large part of the unions' function revolves around social activities, the most common of which are the so-called "science trips", a tradition where companies and organizations in the industry invite students in a relevant field over for a presentation and drinks. Some postgraduate student unions also organize small-scale academic seminars.

Félagsstofnun stúdenta is a self-owned institution that runs several services in and around the campus. These include kindergartens, low-rent apartments, cafeterias and a large bookstore.

== Notable faculty members ==
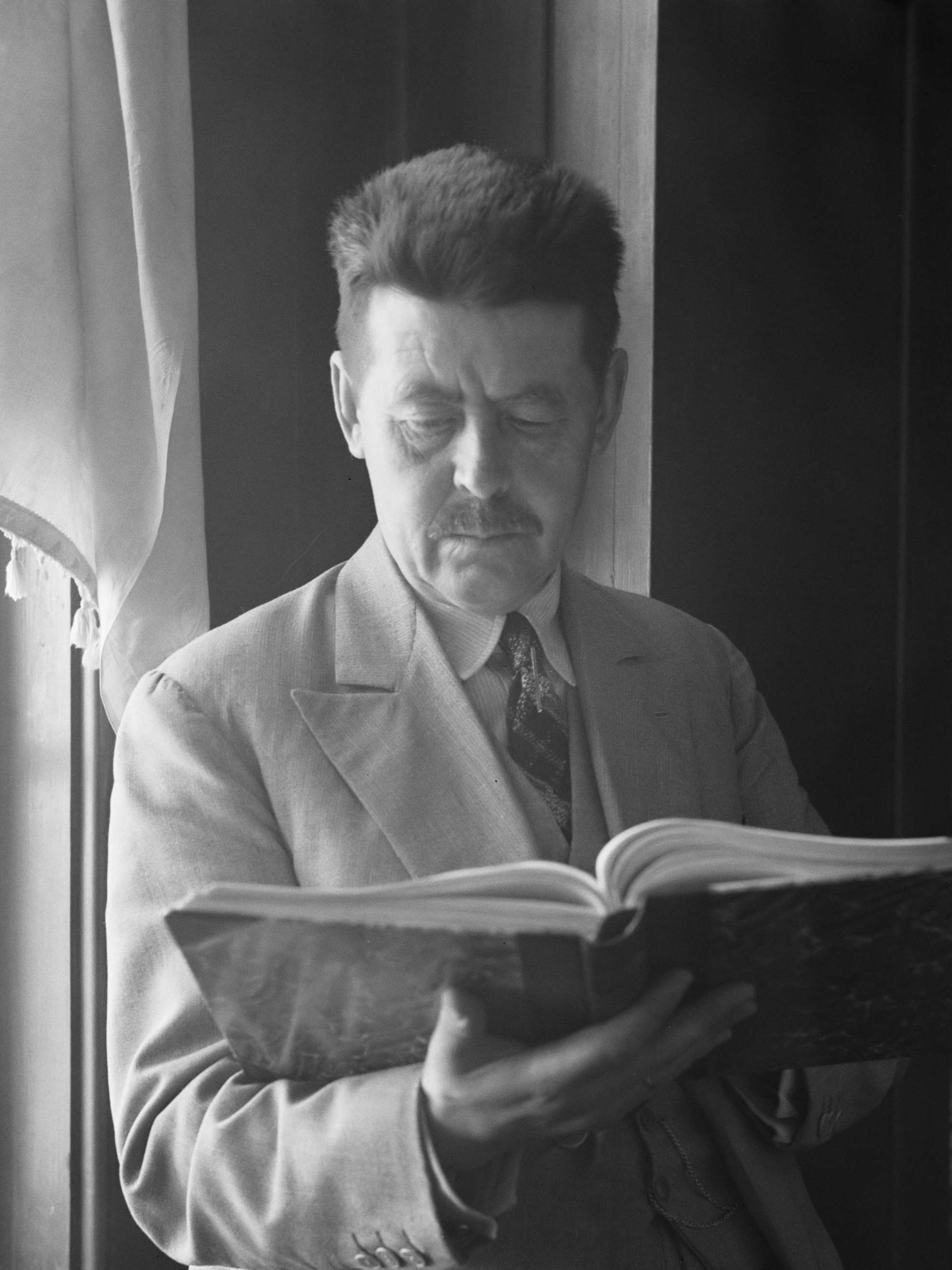
Guðmundur Finnbogason, one of the first Icelandic psychologists

=== Current ===
- Brynhildur Davidsdottir (ecological economist)
- Steven Campana (fisheries scientist)
- Gísli Pálsson (anthropologist)
- Guðbjörg Linda Rafnsdóttir (sociologist)
- Hannes Hólmsteinn Gissurarson (political scientist)
- Hannes Jónsson (theoretical chemist)
- Hrund Ólöf Andradóttir (civil engineer)
- Inga Bergmann Árnadóttir (odontologist)
- Jóhanna Einarsdóttir (early childhood education)
- Unnur Anna Valdimarsdóttir (epidemiologist)
- Vilhjálmur Árnason (philosopher)
- Þór Whitehead (historian)
- Þorvaldur Gylfason (economist)

=== Former ===
- Sigrún Aðalbjarnardóttir (professor emeritus)
- Halldór Ásgrímsson (lecturer, 1973–1975)
- Guðmundur Finnbogason (writer, teacher)
- Ólafur Ragnar Grímsson (political scientist, former President of Iceland)
- Þorsteinn Gylfason (philosopher)
- Erlendur Haraldsson (social scientist)
- Guðni Th. Jóhannesson (former President of Iceland)
- Sigurður Nordal (Medieval literature scholar)
- Páll Skúlason (philosopher, 1945-2015)
- Sigurður Þórarinsson (geologist)

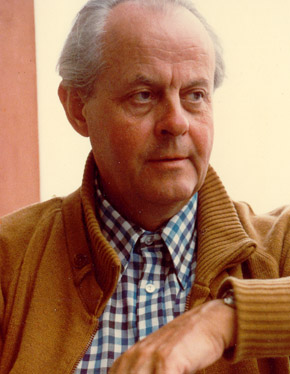
Einar Pálsson, writer

== Notable alumni ==
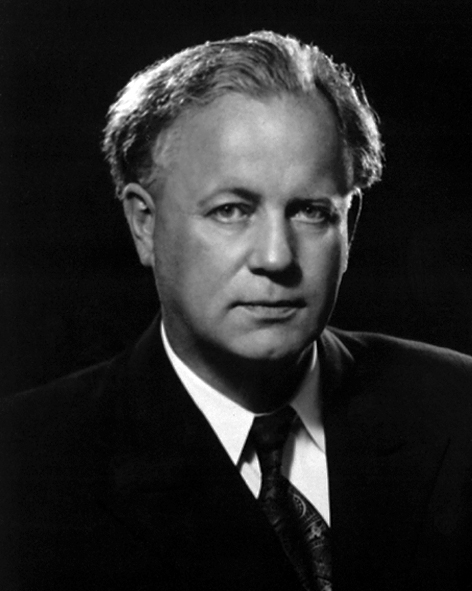
Ásgeir Ásgeirsson, second President of Iceland

- Vigdís Finnbogadóttir (former President of Iceland)
- Ólafía Einarsdóttir (archaeologist)
- Arnaldur Indriðason (writer)
- Arndís Þórarinsdóttir (writer)
- Ásgeir Ásgeirsson (politician, former President of Iceland)
- Björn Bjarnason (politician)
- Davíð Oddsson (politician)
- Einar Pálsson (literature)
- Einar Már Guðmundson (writer)
- Fríða Ísberg (writer)
- Friðrik Sophusson (politician)
- Guðmundur Finnbogason (writer, teacher)
- Hreiðar Már Sigurðsson (businessman)
- Kári Stefánsson (physician and scientist)
- Katrín Jakobsdóttir (former Prime Minister of Iceland, writer)
- Kristín Steinsdóttir (writer)
- Kristín Marja Baldursdóttir (writer)
- Magnús Scheving (actor)
- Rannveig Þorsteinsdóttir (lawyer and politician)
- Sigurjón Sighvatsson (film producer)
- Stefán Jón Hafstein (writer and statesman)
- Thor Sigfusson (businessman)
- Vigdís Grímsdóttir (writer)
- Þórarinn Eldjárn (writer)
- Þórður Helgason (writer and educationalist)
- Össur Skarphéðinsson (politician)
- Steinunn Helga Lárusdóttir (professor emerita)
- Páll Logason (powerlifter and strongman)
- Jacob Winchester (writer, voice actor, and composer)

== See also ==
- Skemman.is (digital library)
- National and University Library of Iceland
- Icelandic scholars
- List of modern universities in Europe (1801–1945)
