= Andradóttir =

Andradóttir is an Icelandic patronymic. Notable people with the name include:

- Amanda Andradóttir
- Hrund Ólöf Andradóttir
- Sigrún Andradóttir

== See also ==
- Aradóttir
- Árnadóttir
- Arnardóttir
