= Guðbjörg =

Guðbjörg is a given name. Notable people with the name include:

- Guðbjörg Aradóttir, Icelandic entomologist
- Guðbjörg Jóna Bjarnadóttir (born 2001), Icelandic sprinter
- Guðbjörg Gunnarsdóttir (born 1985), Icelandic footballer
- Guðbjörg Guttormsdóttir (born 1989), Icelandic figure skater
- Guðbjörg Norðfjörð (born 1972), Icelandic basketball player
- Guðbjörg Linda Rafnsdóttir (born 1957), Icelandic professor
- Guðbjörg Sverrisdóttir (born 1992), Icelandic basketball player
- Guðbjörg Vilhjálmsdóttir, Icelandic professor
- Ólína Guðbjörg Viðarsdóttir (born 1982), Icelandic footballer

== See also ==
- Guðbjörg ÍS-46, Icelandic freezer trawler
