= Rafnsdóttir =

Rafnsdóttir is an Icelandic surname. Notable people with the surname include:

- Guðbjörg Linda Rafnsdóttir (born 1957), Icelandic professor
- Solveig Rafnsdóttir (1470–1561 or 1563), Icelandic nun
