= Jean-François Berdah =

French historian (born 1961)

Jean-François Berdah is associate professor at the Department of History at the University of Toulouse II - Le Mirail (since 1998).

== Biography ==
Jean-François Berdah was born in Paris in 1961. He first studied at the University of Paris X Nanterre (1981–1985), at the University of Göttingen (1983–1984), at the European Institute of High International Studies in Strasbourg (IHEE) (1987–1988) and finally at the Casa de Velázquez (Institute for High Hispanic Studies, Madrid) (1992–1994). He held DAAD scholarships in 1983–1984 and 1988, and promoted in 1996 at Paris 12 Val de Marne University. He was elected at the University of Toulouse II - Le Mirail in 1998. His lectures are focused on Modern European history (19th–20th century), and more specifically on the history of European peripheries in a comparative perspective.

He was offered an external senior fellowship at the School of History of the Freiburg Institute for Advanced Studies (FRIAS) from October 2009 to September 2010 to develop a new research on the "Fringes of Europe" in a comparative perspective from the 18th to the 20th century. He also participated in several European academic networks of excellence, CLIOHNET, CLIOHNET 2 (2002–2005), CLIOHRES (2005–2010) and is currently in charge of the team represented in CLIOH-WORLD since 2008 on behalf of the University of Toulouse II - Le Mirail.

He is co-founder and chief-editor of the Revue d'Histoire Nordique since 2005, a bilingual French-English historical review dedicated to the history and civilisation of both Scandinavia and the Baltic countries, and director of the Centre of Excellence Jean Monnet of the University of Toulouse II-Le Mirail.

He has mainly written on Spanish Modern history, for instance Spanish foreign policy during the Second Republic and the Spanish Civil War (1931–1939) with regard to the great powers and the Spanish Republican exile in France after 1936–1939, but he also published articles about Scandinavian modern history. He is now involved in a broad research project dedicated to the peripheries of Europe (i.e. Northern Europe, East-Central and South-Eastern Europe and Mediterranean Europe) from the 18th to the 20th century.

== Selected works ==
=== Monographs ===
- (2002) La democracia asesinada. La República española y las grandes potencias , Barcelona:Crítica.
- (2000) La démocratie assassinée. La République espagnole et les grandes puissances, 1931–1939, Paris:Berg International.

=== Edited books ===
- (2009) Raingard Esser and Steven Ellis, with Jean-François Berdah and Miloš Řeznik (eds.), Frontiers and Regions in Comparative Perspective , Pisa:Plus Pisa University Press
- (2007) Jean-François Berdah, Anny Bloch-Raymond and Colette Zytnicki (Eds.), D’une frontière à l’autre. Migrations, passages, imaginaires, Toulouse:PUM "Méridienne", 243 p.
- (2003) Alonso Puerta, Jean-François Berdah, Bruno Vargas, José Carlos Gibaja and Juan Francisco Fuentes (Ed.), El socialismo en el exilio y la construcción europea, Madrid:Fundación Acción Socialista Europea/Fundación Indalecio Prieto, 115 p.

=== Articles (selection) ===
- (2009) "La Junta para Ampliación de Estudios : Une institution tournée vers l’Europe et la modernité (1907–1939), Patrick Ferté and Caroline Barrera (eds.), Étudiants de l’exil. Migrations internationales et universités refuges (XVIe-XXe s.), Toulouse:Presses Universitaires du Mirail, 225–239.
- (2009) with Raingard Eßer, Martin Moll and Ana Maria Pult Quaglia, "Regional History in Austria, France, Italy, the Netherlands and Spain", Raingard Esser and Steven Ellis with Jean-François Berdah and Miloš Řeznik (eds.), Frontiers and Regions in Comparative Perspective, Pisa:Plus Pisa University Press, 37–53.
- (2009) "Pyrenees without Frontiers. The French-Spanish Border in Modern Times (17th–20th century)”, Raingard Esser and Steven Ellis with Jean-François Berdah and Miloš Řeznik (eds.), Frontiers and Regions in Comparative Perspective, Pisa:Plus Pisa University Press, 163–184.
- (2009) "The Devil in France. The Tragedy of Spanish Republicans and French Policy after the Civil War (1936–1945)”, Gudmundur Halfdanarson and Ann Katherine Isaacs (eds.), Discrimination and Tolerance in Historical Perspective, Pisa:Plus Pisa University Press, 142–154.
- (2008) "The Triumph of Neutrality : Bernadotte and European Geopolitics (1810–1844)”, Nordic Historical Review/Revue d'Histoire Nordique, n°6–7, 15–78.
- (2008) "Des CTE à l’Organisation Todt (1939–1945) : L’apport économique des Républicains espagnols dans le Tarn", Bruno Vargas (ed.), La Seconde République espagnole en exil en France (1939–1977), Albi:Presses Universitaires de Champollion, 69–109.
- (2008) "Pablo de Azcárate, l’apôtre inconnu de la paix", Jean-Pierre Amalric (ed.), Les intellectuels espagnols dans l’arène politique. Journées Manuel Azaña 2007, Montauban:Arkheia, 65–92.
- (2007) "Spanische politische Flüchtlinge in Europa seit dem Beginn des Bürgerkriegs 1936 (Beispiel Frankreich)”, Klaus J. Bade, Pieter C. Emmer, Leo Lucassen and Jochen Otmer (eds.), Enzyklopädie Migration in Europa. Vom 17. Jahrhundert bis zum Gegenwart, Paderborn:Schöningh, 1000–1004.
- (2007) "Los orígenes de la construcción europea. De la idea europea a la Europa unida", Cuadernos Europeos de Deusto, n°37, 49–71.
- (2007) "La désillusion de Manuel Azaña : la politique de la France face à la République espagnole (1931–1939)”, Jean-Pierre Amalric (ed.), Manuel Azaña et la France. Journées Manuel Azaña 2006, Montauban:Arkheia, 53–71
- (2007) "Accueil et mise au travail forcé des Républicains espagnols dans le Tarn (1938–1940)”, Revue du Tarn, n°207, 449–466
- (2007) "Les chemins de l’exil. La tragédie des républicains espagnols et la politique de la France pendant la guerre civile", Jean-François Berdah, Anny Bloch-Raymond and Colette Zytnicki (eds.) D’une frontière à l’autre. Migrations, passages, imaginaires, Toulouse:PUM "Méridienne", 131–150.
- (2006) "Citizenship and National Identity in France from the French Revolution to the Present", Steven G. Ellis, Gudmundur Halfdanarson and Ann Katherine Isaacs (eds.), Citizenship in Historical Perspective, Pisa:Plus Pisa University Press, 141–153.
- (2006) "De la solidaridad republicana al cobarde abandono. Francia y la Guerra de España" in, La República aislada. ¿ Por qué la no intervención ? Ángeles Egido (Ed.) Historia del presente, n°7, Madrid, 43–70
- (2006) "Genèse d’une résistance. Les CTE et GTE au cœur du combat contre le fascisme (1939–1944)”, Jean Ortiz (ed.), Rouges. Maquis de France et d’Espagne, Biarritz:Atlantica,81-103.
- (2006) “ La frontière existe-t-elle pour les historiens ? La frontière franco-espagnole au XXe siècle ”, Robert Belot (ed.), Guerre et Frontières. La frontière franco-suisse pendant la Seconde Guerre mondiale (1939–1945), Paris:Lavauzelle, 49–67.
- (2005) "Military Rearmament and Industrial Competition in Spain : Germany vs. Britain (1921–1931)”, Essays on Industrialisation in France, Norway and Spain, Kristine Bruland (Ed.), Tid og Tanke, n°9, Oslo, 135–168
- (2005) "L’intervention italienne dans la guerre civile espagnole et la politique extérieure fasciste", Alberto Bianco and Philippe Foro (Ed.),Idée impériale et impérialisme dans l’Italie fasciste, Toulouse:PUM, ECRIT n°9, 49–63
- (2003) "Les intellectuels espagnols et la République : de la prise de conscience à l’engagement politique", Histoire et littérature au XXe siècle. Recueil d’études offert à Jean Rives, Sources et travaux d’Histoire immédiate n°13, Toulouse:GRHI, 241–254
- (2003) "España y los judíos en la primera mitad del siglo XX", El olivo y la espada. Estudios sobre el antisemitismo en España (siglos XVI-XX), Pere Joan and Heike Nottenbaum. (Eds.), Romana Judaica 6, Tübingen:Niemeyer, 363–378
- (2003) "Culture nationale et nationalisme en Europe : l’analyse comparée des exemples scandinave et espagnol (1830–1914)”, Michel Bertrand, Patrick Cabanel et Bertrand de Lafargue (Eds.), La fabrique des nations. Figures de l’État-nation dans l’Europe du XIXe siècle, Paris:Les Éditions de Paris-Max Chaleil, 251–265.
- (1999) “ Le personnel diplomatique anglais, allemand et espagnol dans la période de l’entre-deux-guerres (1914–1939) : une analyse comparée", Los protagonistas de las relaciones internacionales, Colloque International de Madrid, 7–9 avril 1994, Talence, Bulletin d’Histoire Contemporaine de l’Espagne, n°28–29, 83–118
- (1999) "De l’intégration européenne à l’isolement international : la politique extérieure de l’Espagne républicaine (1931–1939)”, Relations internationales n°97, 5–21
- (1998) "La propagande culturelle britannique en Espagne de 1939 à 1946 : l’action du British Council, Guerres mondiales et conflits contemporains, n°189, 95–107
- (1997) "La République, la SDN et le Comité de Londres", La política exterior de España en el siglo XX, International Conference of Madrid, 10–13 December 1997, Madrid:UNED, 135–149
- (1994) "L’Allemagne et le Royaume-Uni face à la question espagnole : reconnaissance de facto ou reconnaissance de jure ? (1936–1939), Mélanges de la Casa de Velázquez, Tome XXIX-3 (Époque contemporaine), 1993, Madrid, 1994,203–241
- (1993) “ La propaganda cultural británica durante la Segunda Guerra mundial a través de la acción del British Institute : un aspecto de las relaciones Hispano-británicas", Javier Tusell, Susana Sueiro, José María Marín and Marina Casanova (Eds.), El régimen de Franco (1936–1975). Vol. II. Política y Relaciones Exteriores, Congreso Internacional de Madrid, Mayo 1993, Madrid. U.N.E.D., 273–286

== Sources ==
- http://www.lexpress.fr/actualite/societe/ce-serait-un-honneur-d-obtenir-la-nationalite-espagnole_742143.html
- http://noticias.universia.es/movilidad-academica/noticia/2006/12/15/594399/50-aniversario-tratados-dieron-origen-actual-union-europea.html
- https://web.archive.org/web/20110716214357/http://franskainstitutet.thalasoft.com/newsstory/170
- http://www.svd.se/kulturnoje/nyheter/den-neutrala-kungen_4751495.svd
- http://noticias.universia.es/vida-universitaria/noticia/2003/09/09/616998/andalucia-guerra-exilio.html
- http://www.canalc2.tv/video.asp?idVideo=6069&voir=&mac=yes&btRechercher=&mots=&idfiche=
- https://web.archive.org/web/20110723170543/http://www.wat.tv/audio/jean-francois-berdah-conference-12idb_2h1iz_.html
- https://web.archive.org/web/20110714113438/http://mediatheque.montpellier-agglo.com/action-culturelle-/conferences-enregistrees/rencontre-avec-jean-francois-berdah-fev-08-27-4-mo-61224.khtml?RH=1170340252774
- http://www.indexsavant.fr/index.php?title=Revue_d%E2%80%99histoire_nordique
- http://www.arkheia-revue.org/La-politique-de-la-France-face-a.html
- https://web.archive.org/web/20110723170603/http://www.wat.tv/audio/recherche-en-europe-jean-francois-zl03_2h1iz_.html
- http://www.clioh.net/core/
