= Pierre-Jean Souriac =

French historian

Pierre-Jean Souriac is a contemporary French historian, a Lecturer in Modern History at Jean Moulin University Lyon 3.

== Biography ==
Souriac is a specialist of history of religions, and more precisely religious conflicts in the 16th century and their extension in local political contexts, of military history, public finances and political power under the Ancien Régime and the provincial and municipal institutions in Ancien Régime France.

== Publications ==
1. La double fidélité des places protestantes sous Louis XIII : au roi et au parti, in Astoul, Guy, Chareyre, Philippe (dir.), Le protestantisme et la cité, Montauban, SMERP, 2013, p. 89-107.
2. Les fantasmes d’une menace. La peur d’une frontière intérieure à Toulouse au temps des guerres de Religion, inBethancourt, Francisco, Crouzet, Denis (dir.), Les frontières religieuses dans le monde moderne, Paris, PUPS, 2013, p. 31-52.
3. Pouvoir pontifical et pouvoir monarchique dans les écrits historique d’Étienne Pasquier, in Sylvio de Franceschi (dir.),Histoires antiromaines, Lyon, Chrétiens et Sociétés, col. « Documents et Mémoires », 2011, p. 11-34.
4. Réparer les dommages de guerre en Haut Languedoc au temps des troubles de religion, Liame, 2001, n°21, p. 10-31.
5. Capitaines et brigands face à l’ordre public en temps de guerre civile, in Marie Houllemare and Philippe Nivet (dir.),Justice et guerre de l’Antiquité à la Première Guerre Mondiale, Amiens, Encrage, 2011, p. 40-61.
6. La cathédrale dans les guerres de Religion and Le mariage d’Henri IV et la paix de Lyon, in Philippe Barbarin (dir.),La grâce d’une cathédrale. Lyon, primatiale des Gaules, Strasbourg, La Nuée Bleue, 2011, p. 341-355, p. 356-358.
7. Choix confessionnel et engagement partisan d’une place de sûreté protestante : Castres entre 1620 et 1629, in Bruno Dumons et Bernard Hours, Ville et religion, Grenoble, PUG, 2010.
8. Henri Lancelot Voisin de La Popelinière, Histoire de France critical edition under the direction of Denise Turrel, Geneva, Droz, 2010.
9. Une solution armée de coexistence. Les places de sûreté protestantes comme élément de pacification des guerres de Religion, in Didier Boisson and Yves Krumenacker (dir.), La coexistence confessionnelle à l’épreuve, Lyon, Chrétien et Sociétés, col. "Documents et Mémoires" n°9, 2009, p. 51-72.
10. Écrits historiques et excommunication sous Henri III et Henri IV, in Sylvio de Franceschi (dir.), Antiromanisme doctrinal et romanité ecclésiale, Lyon, Chrétiens et Sociétés, coll. "Documents et Mémoire" n°7, 2009, p. 11-44.
11. Entre capitale protestante et citadelle catholique, Lyon de 1563 à 1594, in Yves Krumenacker (dir.), Lyon 1562, capitale protestante, Lyon, Olivetan, 2009, p. 221-270.
12. Financer sa cause. Argent et pouvoir municipal à Toulouse durant les guerres de Religion, in Bernadette Suau, Jean-Pierre Amalric, Jean-Marc Olivier (dir.), Toulouse, une métropole méridionale, Toulouse, Framespa, 2009, vol. 1, p. 355-370.
13. Hommes de guerre dans le Midi toulousain au temps des guerres de Religion : essai d’identification, in Philippe Contamine (dir.), Hommes et terres du Sud, Paris, CTHS, 2009, p. 74-96.
14. Affrontements religieux, révoltes et guerres civiles. Formes et moyens d’une société divisée, XVIe-XVIIe siècles, in Lucien Bély, Les affrontements religieux en Europe, Paris, PUPS, 2009, p. 82-101.
15. Les affrontements religieux, Paris, Belin, 2009 (in collaboration with René Souriac)
16. Une guerre civile. Affrontements politiques et religieux en Midi toulousain (1562–1596), Seyssel, Champ Vallon, 2009. Prix Georges-Goyau 2009 of the Académie française.
17. Juger la guerre civile. Écrire l'histoire des guerres de Religion au temps des troubles, Combattre, tolérer, Justifier. Écrivains et journalistes face à l'usage de la violence d'État, Université de Rouen, 5 février 2006, Cahiers du GRHIS.
18. L'impossible solution royale face aux tensions catholico-protestantes du début des guerres de Religion : les échecs d'un homme du roi en Midi toulousain, Antoine de Lomagne, vicomte de Terride, L'échec dans l'histoire, Université de Marne-La-Vallée, 26–28 May 2005, Paris, L'Harmattan, 2008.
19. L’engagement militaire des campagnes toulousaines au temps des guerres de Religion, Sociabilité et politique en milieu rural, Rennes, P.U.R., sous presse.
20. Du corps à corps au combat fictif : quand les catholiques toulousains mettaient en scène leurs combats contre les protestants, Les affrontements religieux, Rennes, P.U.R.
21. Politique urbaine et engagement militaire. Toulouse et Amiens face à la proximité de la guerre au XVIe siècle, in Carpi, Olivia and Nivet, Philippe, Guerre et politique en Picardie aux époques moderne et contemporaine, Amiens, Encrage, 2007, p. 25-39.
22. Les chemins de l’intransigeance. Radicalité catholique et engagement politique à Toulouse durant les guerres de Religion (1562–1596), Moreana, vol. 43, n°166-167, December 2006, p. 83-114
23. Les États de Languedoc face à la guerre dans la première moitié du XVIe siècle, Les cahiers de la Méditerranée, actes du colloque, Crises et conflits en Méditerranée, Nice, 17–19 March 2005, n°71, June 2006.
24. Noblesse commingeoise et service armé du roi de France, Revue de Comminges, vol. CXXI, 2005/4, p. 523-550
25. Éloigner le soldat du civil en temps de guerre. Les expériences de trêve en Midi toulousain dans les dernières années des guerres de Religion, Revue historique, 306/4, December 2004, p. 788-818.
26. Comprendre une société confrontée à la guerre civile : le Midi toulousain entre 1562 et 1596, Histoire, Économie, Société, n°2, June 2004, p. 261-272.
27. Foules et guerres civiles. Mobilisation et présence militaire dans la région toulousaine durant la première décennie des guerres de Religion (1562–1570), in Rothiot, Jean-Paul, L'effort de guerre. Actes du 127e congrès du C.T.H.S. - Nancy, 2002, Paris, éditions du C.T.H.S., 2004, p. 31-51.
28. Les "urgeans" affaires de la ville. Défendre Toulouse durant la première guerre de religion, 1562–1563, Revue d'histoire urbaine, n°3, June 2001, p. 39-65.
