= Ekaterina Velmezova =

Russian and Swiss philologist and slavist

- Born: 3 February 1973 (age 53)
- Scientific career
- Fields: philology, Slavic studies, history of linguistics
- Workplaces: University of Lausanne

Ekaterina Valeryevna Velmezova (Russian: Екатери́на Вале́рьевна Вельме́зова, Ekaterina Valer'yevna Vel'mezova; French: Ekaterina Velmezova; 3 February 1973) is a Russian and Swiss philologist, poet, and Professor of Slavistics and of history and epistemology of language sciences in Eastern Europe at the University of Lausanne, whose principal works concern Russian and Czech ethnolinguistics, as well as history and epistemology of language sciences in Central and Eastern Europe.

Ekaterina Velmezova published the first ever corpus of Czech incantations (Вельмезова, 2004). Her monograph about Nicholas Marr (the largest book about Marr's linguistic doctrines) describes Marr's theories in the context of the language sciences of his era.

Ekaterina Velmezova is the author of a new conception supposing analysis of linguistic theories through literary texts (Вельмезова 2014).

Ekaterina Velmezova is a member of the board of directors of the Society of History and Epistemology of Language Sciences (French: Société d'histoire et d'épistémologie des sciences du langage, Paris), official representative of Swiss Slavists at the International Committee of Slavists, a member of the board of directors of Cercle Ferdinand de Saussure (Geneva) and vice-president of the Centre for Linguistics and Language Sciences at the University of Lausanne.

Ekaterina Velmezova is poet and graphic artist.

== Biography ==
In 2000, Ekaterina Velmezova defended her first PhD thesis, dedicated to the Czech language and folklore, at the Institute of Slavic Studies of the Russian Academy of Sciences. Her second thesis, dedicated to the history of semantic ideas, was defended at the University of Lausanne in 2005 and earned an award from the Faculty of Arts. In 2007, she received the Habilitation à Diriger des Recherches degree from the University of Toulouse II – Le Mirail.

Since 2015 Ekaterina Velmezova is full professor of Slavistics and of history and epistemology of language sciences in Eastern Europe at the University of Lausanne. Since 2021 she is invited professor of Slavic linguistics at the University of Tartu.

Ekaterina Velmezova is editor-in-chief of the Epistemologica et historiographica linguistica Lausannensia book series.

== Monographs ==
- Е. В. Вельмезова. (2004). Чешские заговоры: исслед. и тексты. Традиционная духовная культура славян: ТДКС. Публикация текстов (500 экз ed.). М.: Индрик. p. 277. ISBN 978-5-85759-263-2.
- Ekaterina Velmezova. (2007). Les lois du sens: la sémantique marriste. Slavica Helvetica. Vol. 77. Bern; Berlin; Bruxelles; Frankfurt am Main; New York; Oxford; Wien. ISBN 978-3-03911-208-1.
- Е. В. Вельмезова. (2014). История лингвистики в истории литературы (300 экз ed.). М.: Индрик. p. 414. ISBN 978-5-91674-302-9.

== Collections ==
- L'École sémiotique de Moscou-Tartu / Tartu-Moscou : Histoire. Épistémologie. Actualité. Vol. 40 (Slavica Occitania ed.). Toulouse: Université de Toulouse-Le Mirail. 2015. ISBN 978-2-9538558-9-0. Archived from the original on 2015-10-05.
- Velmezova, Ekaterina; Fadda, Emanuele (eds.) 2022. Ferdinand de Saussure today: Semiotics, history, epistemology (Sign Systems Studies 50/1.) Tartu: University of Tartu Press.

== Poetry collections ==
- 2021: Время, конец и начало [Time, End and Beginning] (Tartu: Dialoog).
- 2023: Тасму [Tasmu] (Tartu: Dialoog) (2024 shortlist for the annual Award of the Estonian Cultural Capital Foundation [Eesti Kultuurkapital]).

== See also ==
- "Ekaterina Velmezova, professeure ordinaire" (in French). University of Lausanne. Archived from the original on 2 October 2015.
- "Ekaterina Velmezova — publications" (in French). University of Lausanne.
