= René Souriac =

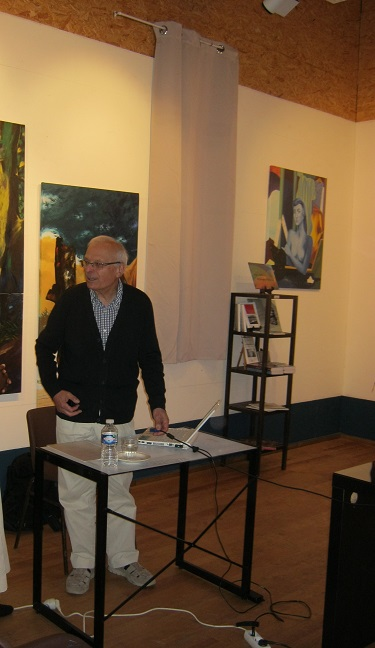
- René Souriac at the Musée de peinture in Saint-Frajou
- Born: 1941 (age 84–85); Saint-Frajou, Haute-Garonne, France
- Occupation: Academic Historian

René Souriac (born 1941 in Saint-Frajou, Haute-Garonne) is a French scholar, a specialist of the history of Comminges.

After studying history at Toulouse, René Souriac passed his agrégation of history in 1966, and joined the Université Toulouse le Mirail in 1969.

A Doctor of Third Cycle in 1973, Doctor of State in 1987 on a subject concerning an example of administrative decentralization in the XVIth, the country of Comminges. Professor of the universities in 1989, he was interested in the cultural evolutions of European societies in the sixteenth, seventeenth and eighteenth centuries, hence his interest in the history of science at that time.

Since 1999, he is the president of the research company of Comminges and the revue de Comminges and the Central Pyrénées.

== Publications ==
- 1978: Le comté de Comminges au milieu du XVI° Siècle, Toulouse, CNRS
- 1996: Histoire de France 1750–1995, Toulouse, Presses Universitaires Mirail, 2 volumes.
- 2002: Les mots de la Renaissance, Toulouse, Presses Universitaires Mirail
- 2008: Les affrontements religieux en Europe, du début du XVIe au milieu du XVIIe, in collaboration with Pierre-Jean Souriac, Paris, Éditions Belin
