= Christian Galan =

French academic

- Born: 1960 (age 65–66); France
- Occupations: Author; professor; researcher
- Writing career
- Subjects: Education in Japan; Japanese language

Christian Galan (born in 1960) is a French Japanologist and professor of Japanese language and civilization at Toulouse-Jean-Jaurès University (formerly Toulouse-le Mirail) and a researcher at the French Research Institute on East Asia (IFRAE; formerly Japanese Studies Center CEJ) of the National Institute for Oriental Languages and Civilizations (Inalco, Paris). He has devoted most of his work to the study of the Japanese education system.

Within the IFRAE, he directs the research group "Education, Childhood(s), and Society in East Asia" (EESAO) and has co-directed with Emmanuel Lozerand the research group "Speech and debates of the Meiji era". He is also director of the Toulouse branch of the CEJ, and co-director with Yves Cadot of the French academic journal Revue d'Études japonaises, established in 2024.

== Biography ==
After graduated from the Ecole Normale of Toulouse in 1982, Christian Galan defended a doctoral thesis in Japanese Studies at Inalco under the supervision of Jean-Jacques Origas in 1997. He also holds the Habilitation to supervise research since 2006. His current teaching at the University of Toulouse-Jean-Jaurès focuses on language as well as Japanese history and society.

His fields of research mainly concern the study of the Japanese educational system in its various dimensions, historical and educational in particular. His career as a researcher has been organized around six major axes to which his various publications are attached: the teaching of reading in Japan: history, politics and pedagogy; the Japanese writing system and the question of illiteracy; teaching Japanese in France and in Europe: policy and research on pedagogy; the history of the Japanese education system: a shift from Edo era education to education in the Meiji era, a chronology of the history of education, and a study of some pivotal times, transfers of knowledge to do in education between Japan and China, etc.; current reforms of the Japanese education system, including universities; the history of childhood and young people in Japan.

He has co-directed with Emmanuel Lozerand, the "Japan Collection" at Belles-Lettres Editions and, between 2010 and 2023, was in charge of a mission of general inspection for the Japanese language subject in secondary education for the French Ministry of National Education.

== Selected works (in English language) ==
In a statistical overview of Christian Galan's writings, WorldCat lists about 22 works in 57 publications in 3 languages in more than 580 library collections

- Patrick Heinrich and Christian Galan (dir. by), Language Life in Japan: Transformations and Prospects, Abingdon, Routledge, 2010. (ISBN 978-0415855129)
- Christian Galan, I’m Learning Japanese, illustrations by Florence Lérot-Calvo, New York, Tuttle Publishing, 2010. (ISBN 978-4805315538)
- Christian Galan, "Language textbooks following the Meiji Restoration. Innovations from the Gakusei period", Cipango - French Journal of Japanese Studies, 2013, n° 2. (DOI https://doi.org/10.4000/cjs.281)
- Christian Galan and Patrick Heinrich (dir. by), Being Young in Super-Aging Japan: Formative Events and Cultural Reactions, Abingdon, Routledge, 2018. (ISBN 978-0367445188)
- Christian Galan, "What immediate lessons can France learn from the Japanese education system?", Le Monde, June 23, 2022. (URL https://www.lemonde.fr/en/opinion/article/2022/06/23/what-immediate-lessons-can-france-learn-from-the-japanese-education-system_5987730_23.html)
- Anne Gonon and Christian Galan, Occupy Tokyo: SEALDs, the Forgotten Movement, Leiden, Brill, 2023. (ISBN 978-9004545922)
- Christian Galan and Harald Salomon (dir. by), Histories of Children and Childhood in Meiji Japan, Abingdon, Routledge, 2023. (ISBN 978-0367651336)
- Christian Galan, "Eugenics and Education in Post-war Japan", translated by Karen Grimwade, Cipango - French Journal of Japanese Studies, 2024, n° 8. (DOI https://doi.org/10.4000/12vjt)
- Christian Galan, "Japan's lesson is clear: Simply reducing the school schedule is not enough for children's well-being", Le Monde, september 3 2025. (URL https://www.lemonde.fr/en/opinion/article/2025/09/04/japan-s-lesson-is-clear-simply-reducing-the-school-schedule-is-not-enough-for-children-s-well-being_6745027_23.html)
