= University of Toulouse-Jean Jaurès =

Public university in Toulouse, France

Coordinates: 43.577702°N 1.404058°E

- Université de Toulouse-Jean Jaurès
- Type: Public
- Established: 1974
- Affiliations: University of Toulouse
- Endowment: €175 M
- President: Emmanuelle Garnier
- Faculty: 1,220
- Administrative staff: 842
- Students: 27,347
- Location: Toulouse, France
- Nickname: UT2J
- Website: www.univ-tlse2.fr

University of Toulouse-Jean Jaurès, (Note: (French: Université Toulouse-Jean Jaurès [ynivɛʁsite tuluz ʒɑ̃ ʒɔʁɛs]; Occitan: Universitat de Tolosa-Jean Jaurès, formerly known as Université de Toulouse-Le Mirail [ynivɛʁsite də tuluz lə miʁaj]; Occitan: Universitat de Tolosa-Lo Miral) also known as Toulouse 2, is a French public university located in Toulouse, France. It is one of the 3 successor universities of the University of Toulouse.

== History ==
University of Toulouse-Jean Jaurès was hastily conceived as a result of the saturation of the original buildings in the city centre and the events of May 1968. At that time it was decided to divide the University of Toulouse into three: The law faculty became Université Toulouse I, occupying all the old university buildings, the humanities faculty became Université de Toulouse II – Le Mirail, named after its new location, and the departments of science and medicine became Université Paul Sabatier (Toulouse III). In 1969, a fourth university in Toulouse was created, Institut National Polytechnique de Toulouse, a school of engineering. Université de Toulouse II – Le Mirail was subsequently renamed Université de Toulouse II – Jean Jaurès after the famous politician Jean Jaurès.

== Campus ==
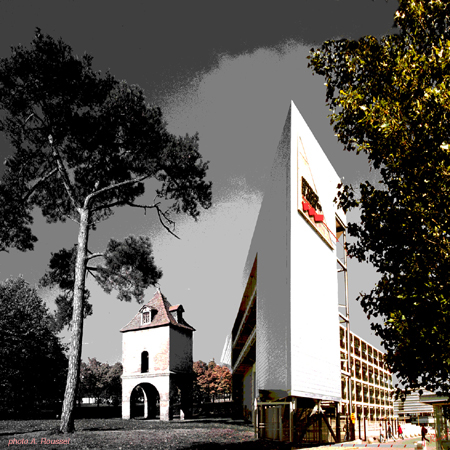
Arch and the dovecote of the university.

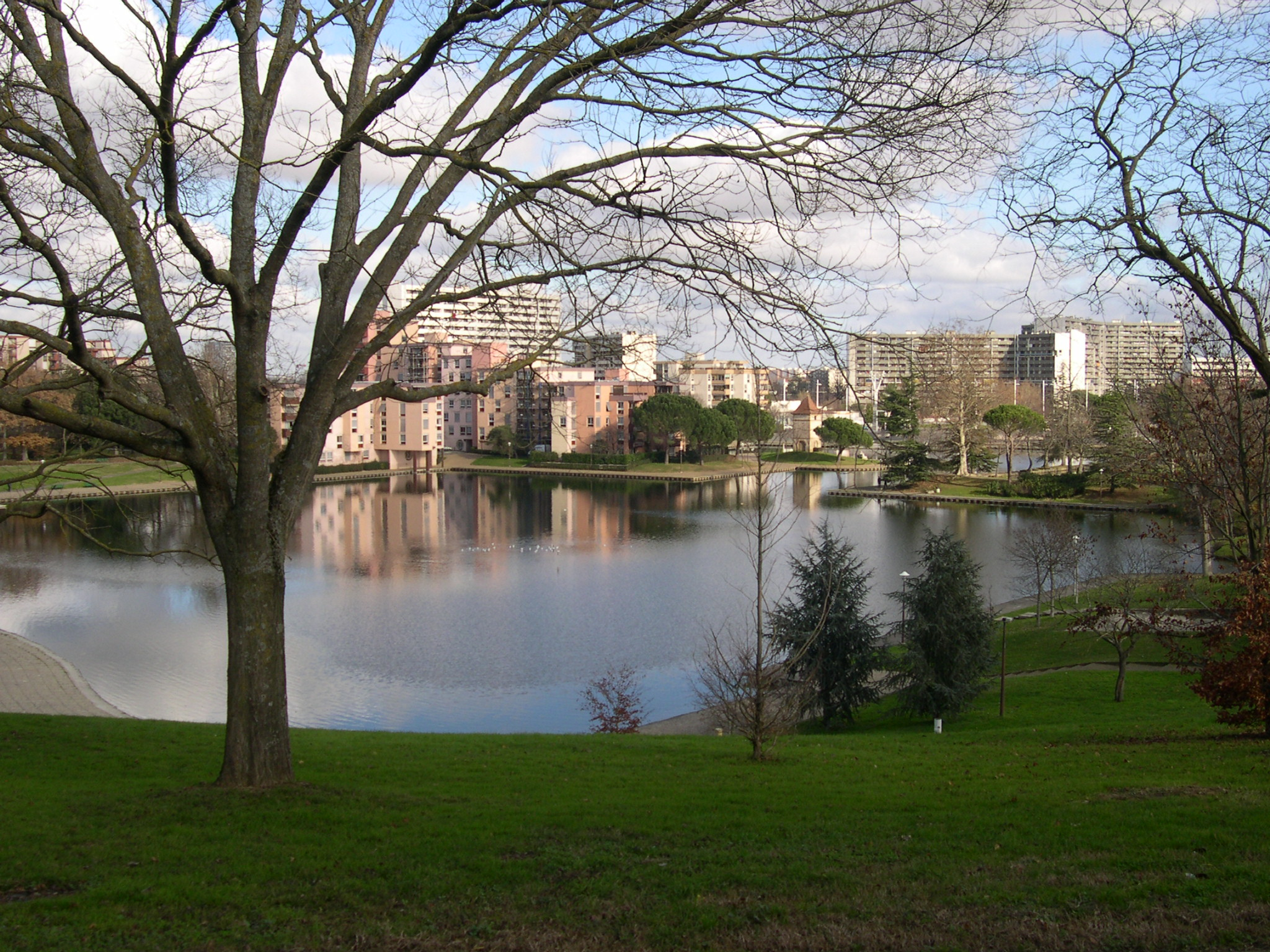
Lake Reynerie at Le Mirail, seen from the neighboring park.

The campus, situated in Toulouse's grand architectural project of the 1960s, Le Mirail, was conceived and built by the team of architects Candilis, Josic, Woods.

After the opening of many extensions (one of which was situated in military barracks) in order to free up the university in the city centre, the campus in Le Mirail opened one section at a time starting in 1971, and completed the transfer by 1973. Planned for 11,000 students, the university today is a victim of its own success, with a student population of roughly 27,500.

== Organisation ==
As the humanities university of Toulouse, it is organised into many pedagogical components: UFRs (unités de formation et de recherche) and university institutes.

School of History, Arts and Archeology

- Department of Anthropology
- Department of Documentation, Archives, Media and Editing
- Department of History
- Department of Art History and Archeology

School of Languages, Literature and Foreign Civilisations

- Department of Translation and Linguistic Interpretation
- Department of Foreign French Language Studies
- Department of Anglophone Studies
- Department of Hispanic Studies
- Department of Foreign Languages
- Department of Applied Foreign Languages
- Department of Linguistics

School of Literature, Philosophy, Music, Arts and Communication

- Department of Design
- Department of Communication and Visual Studies
- Department of Literature, Languages and Ancient Civilisations
- Department of Music
- Department of Philosophy

School of Psychology

- Department of Clinical Psychology
- Department of Cognitive Psychology and Ergonomics
- Department of Developmental Psychology
- Department of Social and Organisational Psychology
- Department of Psychopathology, Health Psychology and Neuroscience

School of Science, Place and Society

- Department of Geography and the Environment
- Department of Informatics
- Department of Education
- Department of Economics and Management
- Department of Sociology

It also has two University Institutes of Technology and several other specialist institutes.

== Research ==
Research is organised in a series of interdisciplinary research centres. These include:

- Centre for Work and Organisations (CERTOP)
- Centre for Cognition, Languages and Ergonomics (CLLE)
- Centre for Education and Knowledge (EFTS)
- Centre for the Study of France, the Americas and Spain (FRAMESPA)
- Centre for Environmental Geography (GEODE)
- Institute of Mathematics (IMT)
- Institute of Information Technology (IRIT)
- Centre for the Study of the Economy, Politics and Social Systems (LEREPS)
- Centre for the Study of Societies (LISST)
- Centre for Archaeology (TRACES).

== Reputation ==
University rankings

Global – Overall
- QS World: 1001-1200 (2023)

National – Overall
- QS National: 29 (2023)

In 2022, it was ranked in the 1001-1200 band of universities in the world.

== Notable faculty ==
- Bartolomé Bennassar (1929–2018) - historian and writer
- Gérard Granel (1930–2000) - philosopher and translator
- Alain Ducellier (1934–2018) - historian
- René Souriac (born 1941) - historian
- Patrick Le Roux (born 1943) - historian
- Michel Zink (born 1945) - writer, medievalist, philologist
- Henry Fourès (born 1948) - historian of music and musician
- Ángel Bahamonde Magro (born 1949) - Spanish historian
- Christian Galan (born 1960) - Japanese language and civilisation
- Jean-François Berdah (born 1961) - historian
- Corinne Maury - film studies
- Jean-Marc Olivier (born 1961) - historian

== Notable alumni ==
- Bartolomé Bennassar (1929–2018) - historian and writer
- Jean-Luc Nancy (1940–2021) - philosopher
- Patrick Le Roux (born 1943) - historian
- Abdelhak Serhane (born 1950) - Moroccan novelist
- Bernard Stiegler (1952–2020) - philosopher
- Aida Toledo (born 1952) - Guatemalan poet, short story writer, non-fiction writer and educator
- John Sibi-Okumu (born 1954) - Kenyan actor and journalist
- Jacques Jaubert (born 1957) - prehistorian and Paleolithic archaeologist
- Gilles Poux - politician
- Mohammed Ameur (born 1959) - Moroccan politician
- Joël Suhubiette (born 1962) - choral conductor
- Christian Authier (born 1969) - novelist and journalist
- Stéphan Perreau (born 1969) - contemporary musician and art historian
- Maria Ubach i Font (born 1973) - Andorran diplomat
- Ekaterina Velmezova (born 1973) - Russian and Swiss philologist, professor of Slavistics and of history and epistemology of language sciences
- Guðbjörg Vilhjálmsdóttir - Icelandic professor in Career Guidance and Counselling
- Judy Quinn (born 1974) - Canadian writer and editor
- Marie-Sophie Lacarrau (born 1975) - journalist and TV presenter

== See also ==
- University of Toulouse
