= Mohammed Ameur =

Moroccan politician (born 1955)

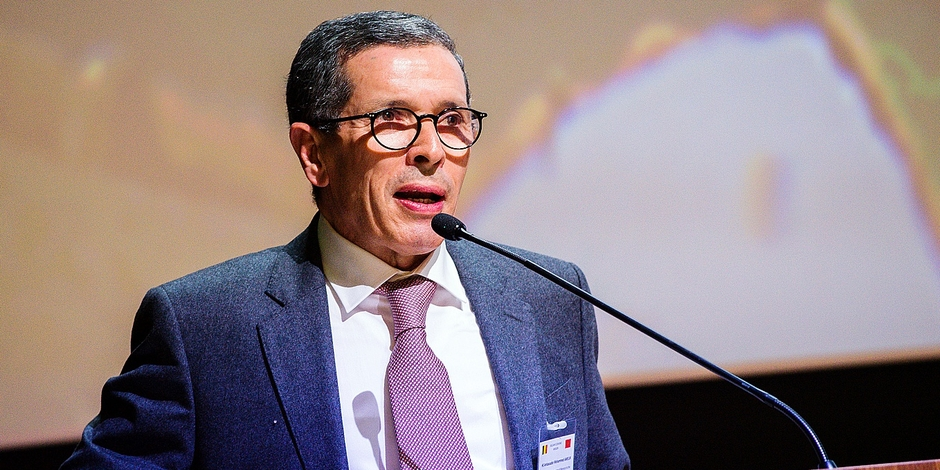

Morocco Ambassador to Belgium
- Incumbent
- Assumed office October 2016

Minister-Delegate for Moroccan Living Abroad
- In office 8 October 2007 – 3 January 2012
- Monarch: Mohammed VI
- Preceded by: Nezha Chekrouni
- Succeeded by: Abdellatif Maazouz

General Secretary of the Ministry of Environment and Water
- In office 2002–2007

General Secretary of the Ministry of Urbanism, Housing and Environment
- In office 1998–2002

Personal details
- Born: 31 December 1955 (age 70) Debdou, Morocco
- Party: USFP
- Education: University of Sidi Mohamed Ben Abdellah (Fes); University of Toulouse-Jean Jaurès
- Occupation: Politician

Mohammed Ameur (Arabic: محمد عامر; born 1955, Debdou) is a Moroccan politician of the Socialist Union of Popular Forces. Between 2007 and 2012, he held the position of "Minister-Delegate for the Moroccans Living Abroad" in the cabinet of Abbas El Fassi. He currently serves as the ambassador to Belgium.

== See also ==
- Cabinet of Morocco
