= Gilles Poux =

French mayor

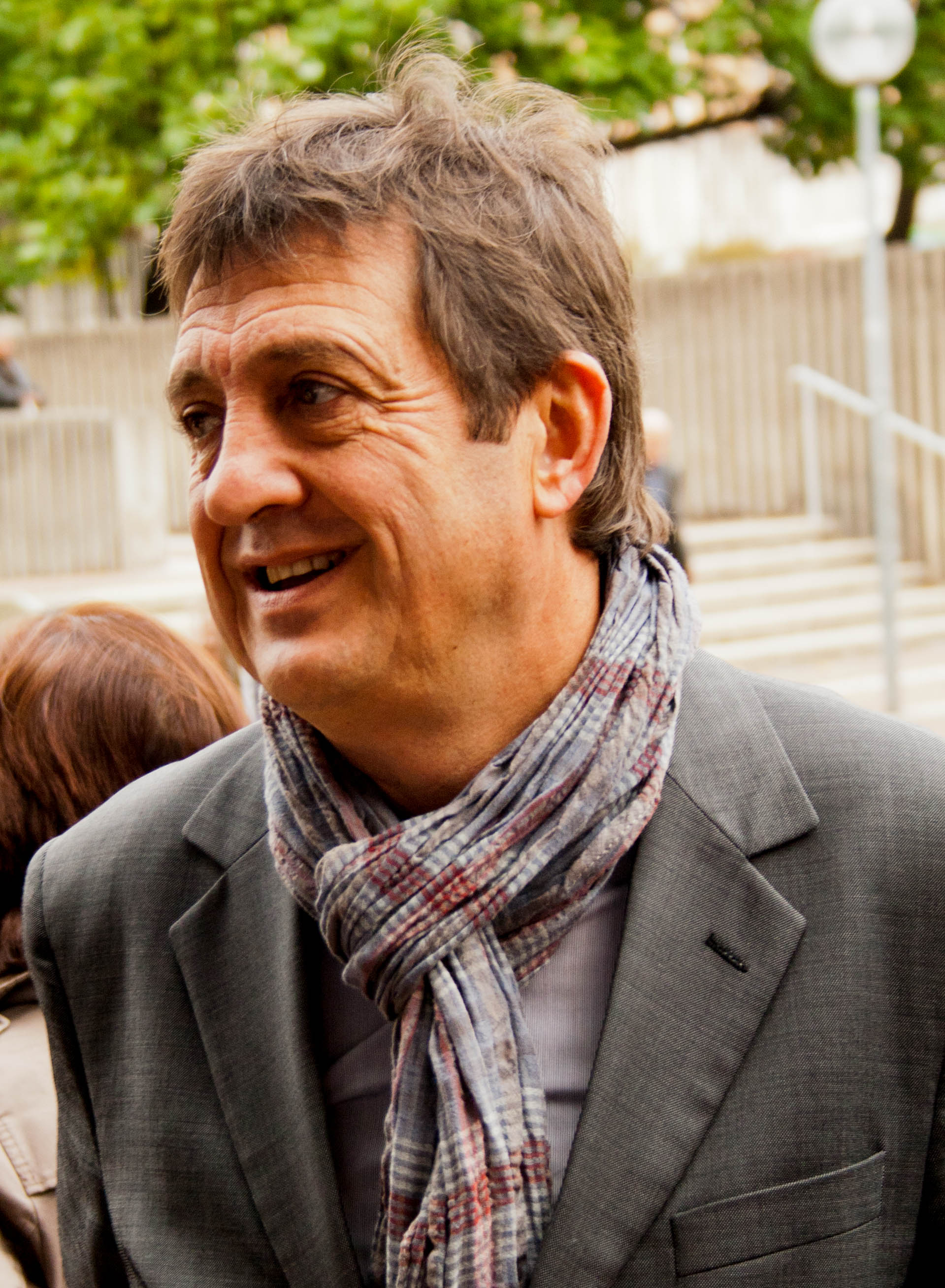
- Gilles Poux in 2012

Mayor
- Incumbent
- Assumed office 1996

Personal details
- Born: 7 June 1957 (age 69) Capdenac-Gare, Aveyron, France

Gilles Poux is the communist mayor of La Courneuve, France, since October 1996. He was born 7 June 1957 in Capdenac-Gare (Aveyron department). He has lived in La Courneuve since 1982. He has one daughter.

== Youth ==
Gilles Poux studied at the comprehensive school of Decazeville (Aveyron). As a high school student, Poux was involved in the student movement against the Haby reforms of 1975.

From 1976 to 1978 he studied for and received a BTS Technical at Marseille. He then continued his studies at the University of Toulouse II – Le Mirail, in 1979, and in Nanterre, in 1980. At the same time, he participated in the demonstrations at Larzac, against the decision to enlarge the military camp there. As a student, he became head of the Union of Communist Students(UEC).

From 1980 to 1981, Poux fulfilled his military obligations in Provins (Seine-et-Marne).

On 11 January 1982 he was hired as a technician at the Babcock factory in La Courneuve (Seine-Saint-Denis department). As an employee of the Babcock company, Poux took on union responsibilities.

== Political career ==
Meanwhile, Poux was involved in local politics, from 1988 to 1995, as secretary of the French Communist Party (FCP) cell of La Courneuve.

=== Councilman and mayor of La Courneuve ===
Elected councilman of La Courneuve in 1989, on a slate of the Union of the Left led by James Marson, Poux became deputy-mayor on 1 March 1995, and delegate for employment and public procurement. On 26 October 1996, he succeeded James Marson as mayor.

In 2001, Poux led the Union of the Left slate in La Courneuve, and was elected to the council in the first round, with 57.47% of votes cast. He was re-elected mayor on 18 March 2001.

Poux created several new festivals in the city: the Feast of the City (first held during the FIFA World Cup in 1998), La Courneuve Plage (first held in 2005), A Sunday in the Country (2006).

On several occasions, Poux marched alongside employees of the city. In particular, he refused the announced closure of the Alstom factory-Rateau, in 2003, and supported the workers on strike. With them he won the preservation of the La Courneuve factory site. With other leftist mayors, he took anti-eviction action and had electricity cuts within the city stopped. From January 2005, he enlarged and accelerated the urban renewal begun by his predecessor in mid-1980.

In 2004, the newspaper Le Canard Enchaîné called Poux's integrity into question, saying that he had received an allocation of housing in May 2004 at the OPHLM (subsidized housing) in La Courneuve (SACP municipal), when his income did not make him eligible for this type of housing.

In 2005, following the shooting death of little Sid Ahmed on 19 June 2005, Poux met with the Interior Minister Nicolas Sarkozy, who announced that he wanted to "clean up the city of Kärcher". After having first welcomed the progress due to the joint efforts of the prefecture and municipal services, Poux then pronounced as unfulfilled commitments from the state.

In 2006, he initiated a local referendum, held on 1 October 2006, on the right of resident aliens in the town to vote, and to stand in local elections, which was challenged by the departmental prefect of Seine-Saint-Denis.

In March 2008, Poux was re-elected mayor in the second round ahead of the Socialist slate headed by Stephane Troussel and the right-wing slate led by Kamel Hamza.

On 5 May 2009, he announced that his city had filed a complaint with the High Authority against Discrimination and for Equality for Territorial Discrimination.

=== Vice president of Plaine Commune ===
Poux initiated a local referendum, held on 7 December 2003, to allow the people of his city to have the final choice about joining the urban community Plaine Commune, which was created in 2000. Open to foreign residents in the city, the vote was challenged by the departmental prefect, but the municipal attorney validated the decision of Courneuviens to join. Poux became Vice President of Urban Renewal and Urban Policy of Plaine Commune on 1 January 2005, on the entry of the city into the community.

=== Water commission ===
In 2008, Poux was one of eight delegates to SEDIF (water commission of Île-de-France) and was elected vice president of the commission on 15 May 2008. Ignoring a request by Patrick Braouezec, Poux cosigned a petition calling for the return of water distribution to being directly controlled by SEDIF, and advocated, on 10 October 2008, to return to commission control management previously delegated to a private operator.

=== Legislative candidate ===
At the end of March 2007, the French Communist Party (FCP) nominated Poux to be a candidate to succeed Muguette Jacquaint, to represent the 3rd district of Seine-Saint-Denis in the National Assembly. Coming in third with 17.99% of the vote, behind Daniel Goldberg and the candidate for the right, Poux was eliminated from the second round. Thus, this communist bastion of Waldeck Rochet and Jack Ralite passed into the hands of the Socialist Party.

In the cantonal elections in March 2011, the FCP made the township of La Courneuve the symbol of its determination to recapture the General Council seat. Opposed by the Socialist incumbent Stephane Troussel, Poux received 32% of votes in the first round against 47% of the vote for the incumbent, in whose favor he withdrew in the second round.

During the national assembly elections in June 2012, Poux was the alternate for Marie-George Buffet. Although overtaken in three out of four cities, including La Courneuve, Buffet lead the first round and then benefited from the withdrawal of the Socialist candidate.
