= Saint-Frajou =

- Commune
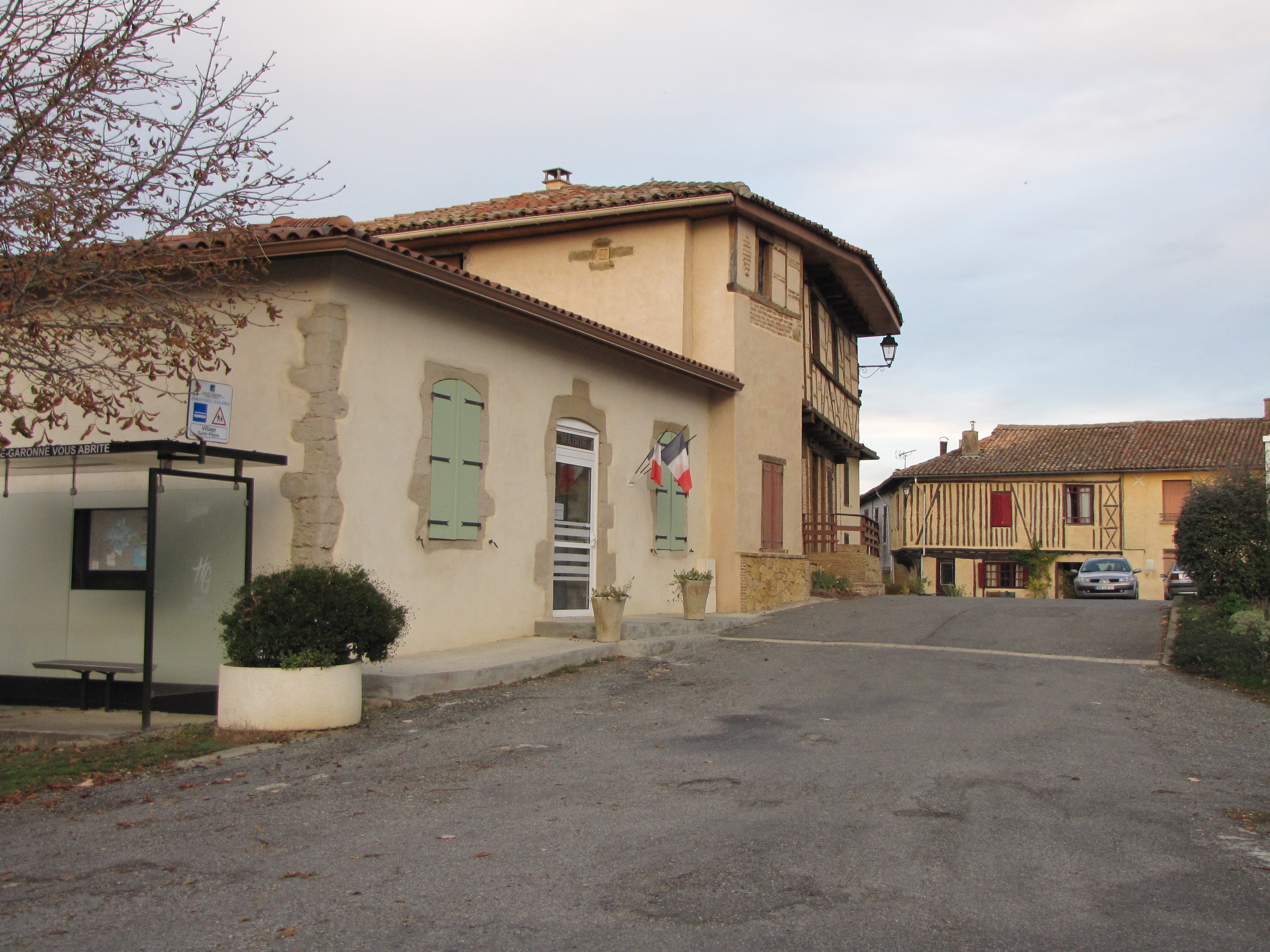
- Town hall

- Coat of arms
- Location of Saint-Frajou
- Location within France Location within Occitanie
- Coordinates: 43°20′05″N 0°51′00″E
- Country: France
- Region: Occitania
- Department: Haute-Garonne
- Arrondissement: Saint-Gaudens
- Canton: Cazères

Government
  - Mayor (2020–2026): Alain Davezac
- Area^{1}: 16.61 km^{2} (6.41 sq mi)
- Elevation: 500 m (1,600 ft)
- Highest elevation: 350 m (1,150 ft)
- Lowest elevation: 222 m (728 ft)
- Population (2023): 204
  - Density: 12.3/km^{2} (31.8/sq mi)
- Time zone: UTC+01:00 (CET)
  - Summer (DST): UTC+02:00 (CEST)
- INSEE/Postal code: 31482 /31230
- ^{1} French Land Register data, which excludes lakes, ponds, glaciers > 1 km^{2} (0.386 sq mi or 247 acres) and river estuaries.

Saint-Frajou (French pronunciation: [sɛ̃ fʁaʒu]; Occitan: Sent Frajó) is a commune in the Haute-Garonne department in southwestern France. The 20th-century historian René Souriac (born 1941) is from Saint-Frajou.

== Population ==
Historical population
Year	Pop.	±% p.a.
1968	239	—
1975	226	−0.80%
1982	226	+0.00%
1990	209	−0.97%
1999	173	−2.08%
2007	182	+0.64%
2012	207	+2.61%
2017	215	+0.76%
2023	204	−0.87%
Source: INSEE

== See also ==
- Communes of the Haute-Garonne department
