= Árnadóttir =

Árnadóttir is an Icelandic feminine patronymic (feminine last name) lierally meaning "daughter of Árni. Notable people people with the name include

- Ásta Árnadóttir (born 1983), Icelandic former footballer who was a defender
- Bergþóra Árnadóttir (1948–2007), Icelandic folk song composer and singer
- Halla Margrét Árnadóttir (born 1964), Icelandic singer, represented Iceland in the Eurovision Song Contest 1987
- Nína Björk Árnadóttir (1941–2000), Icelandic playwright, poet, and novelist
- Ragna Árnadóttir (born 1966), Icelandic lawyer and former Minister of Justice and Ecclesiastical Affairs of Iceland
- Ragnheiður Elín Árnadóttir (born 1967), Icelandic politician, the Minister of Industry and Commerce since 23 May 2013

== See also ==
- Aradóttir
