= Abdelhak Serhane =

Moroccan writer

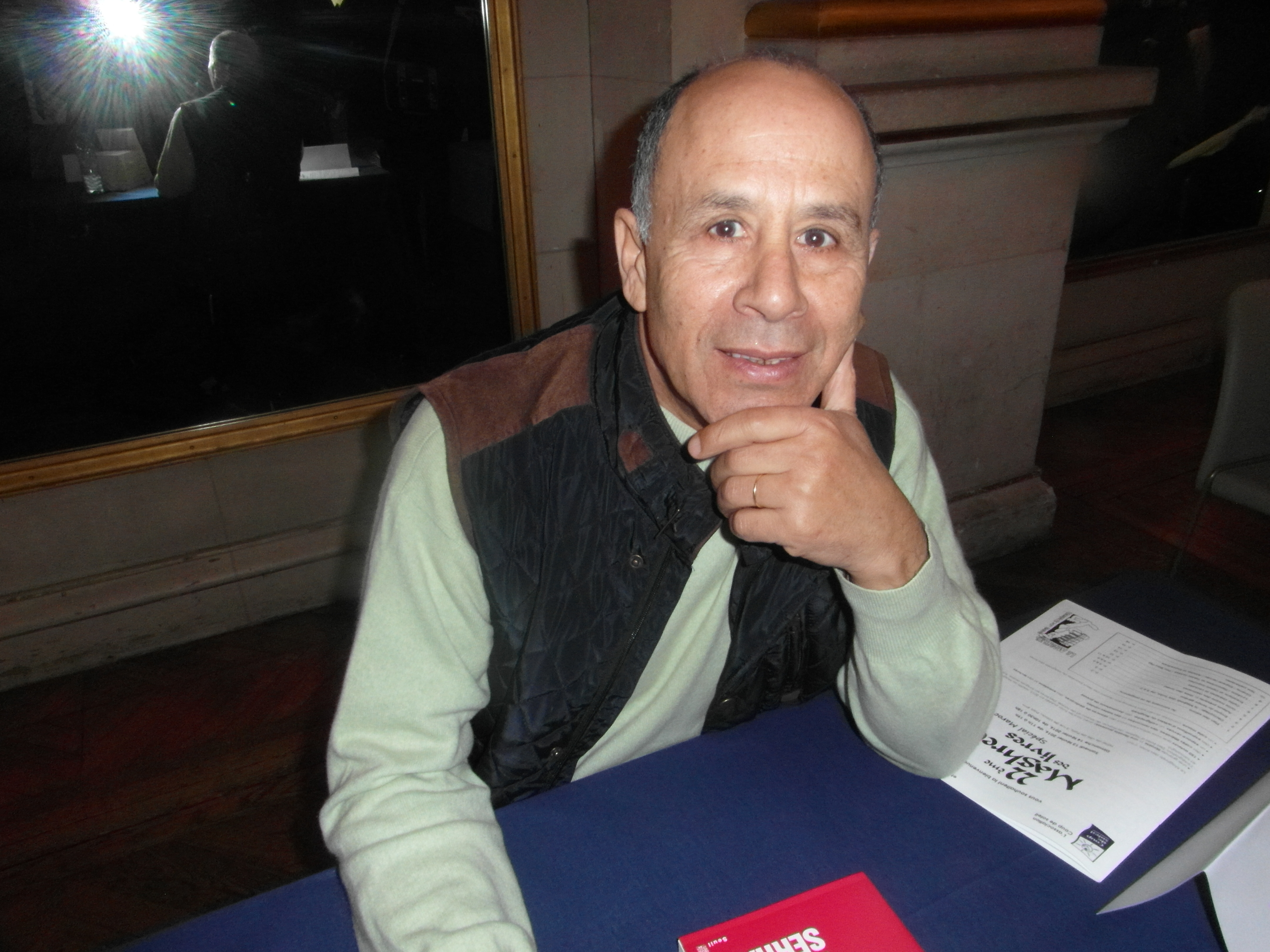
Abdelhak Serhane

Abdelhak Serhane (born in Sefrou in 1950) is a Moroccan novelist writing in French. Serhane grew up in the Middle Atlas region of Morocco, in the village Azrou.

== Early life ==
He studied psychology at the University of Toulouse II and taught at the University Ibn Tofail in Kénitra, Morocco before he went to Canada to escape from the political oppression of the Moroccan government. Since that time he has split his time between Morocco, Canada and the United States where he teaches French literature at the University of Louisiana at Lafayette.

Serhane has been a vociferous critic of the regime of Hassan II and has denounced the violent and oppressive nature of the government at that time in novels like Mesouda and Le Soleil des obscurs. He has taken position against the impunity of those who have enriched themselves thanks to the corruption of the Moroccan political system. In 1993 he received the Prix français du monde arabe, and in 1999 the Prix Francophonie, Afrique méditerranéenne.

== Novels ==
- Messaouda, Paris, Seuil, 1983. (Prix Littéraire des Radios Libres, 1984)
- Les Enfants des rues étroites, Paris, Seuil, 1986.
- Le Soleil des obscurs, Paris, Seuil, 1992. (Prix Français du Monde Arabe, 1993).
- Le Deuil des chiens, Paris, Seuil, 1998.
- Temps noirs, Paris, Seuil, 2002.
- L'homme qui descend des montagnes, Paris, Seuil, 2009.

== Poetry ==
- L'Ivre poème, Rabat, Al Kalum, 1989.
- Chant d'ortie, Paris, L'Harmattan, 1993.
- La Nuit du secret, France, Atelier des Grames, 1992.

== Short stories and other publications ==
- Les Prolétaires de la haine. (collection of short stories) Paris: Publisud, 1995.
- Le Vélo Montréal: XYZ, 1991. Repris dans Anthologie de la nouvelle maghrébine, Casablanca: Eddif, 1996.
- J'écris pour le soleil. In: Actes du Colloque de Montpellier, 1985.
- Les mots de la douleur In: Oualili. Meknès, 1986.
- La Femme : un destin périmé. In: Lamalif. Casablanca, 1986.
- L'Artisan du rêve. In: Visions du Maghreb. Montpellier: Edisud, 1987.
- Le Corpstexte. In: Horizons maghrébins. Toulouse, 1987.
- Un Pays aux couleurs de son temps. In: Librement. Casablanca, 1988.
- Le Destin des pierres. In: Autrement. Paris: 1990.
- L'artisan du rêve. ClicNet: 1997.
- L'Amour circoncis. Casablanca: Eddif, 1996.
- Le Massacre de la tribu. Casablanca: Eddif, 1997.
