= Patrick Le Roux =

French historian

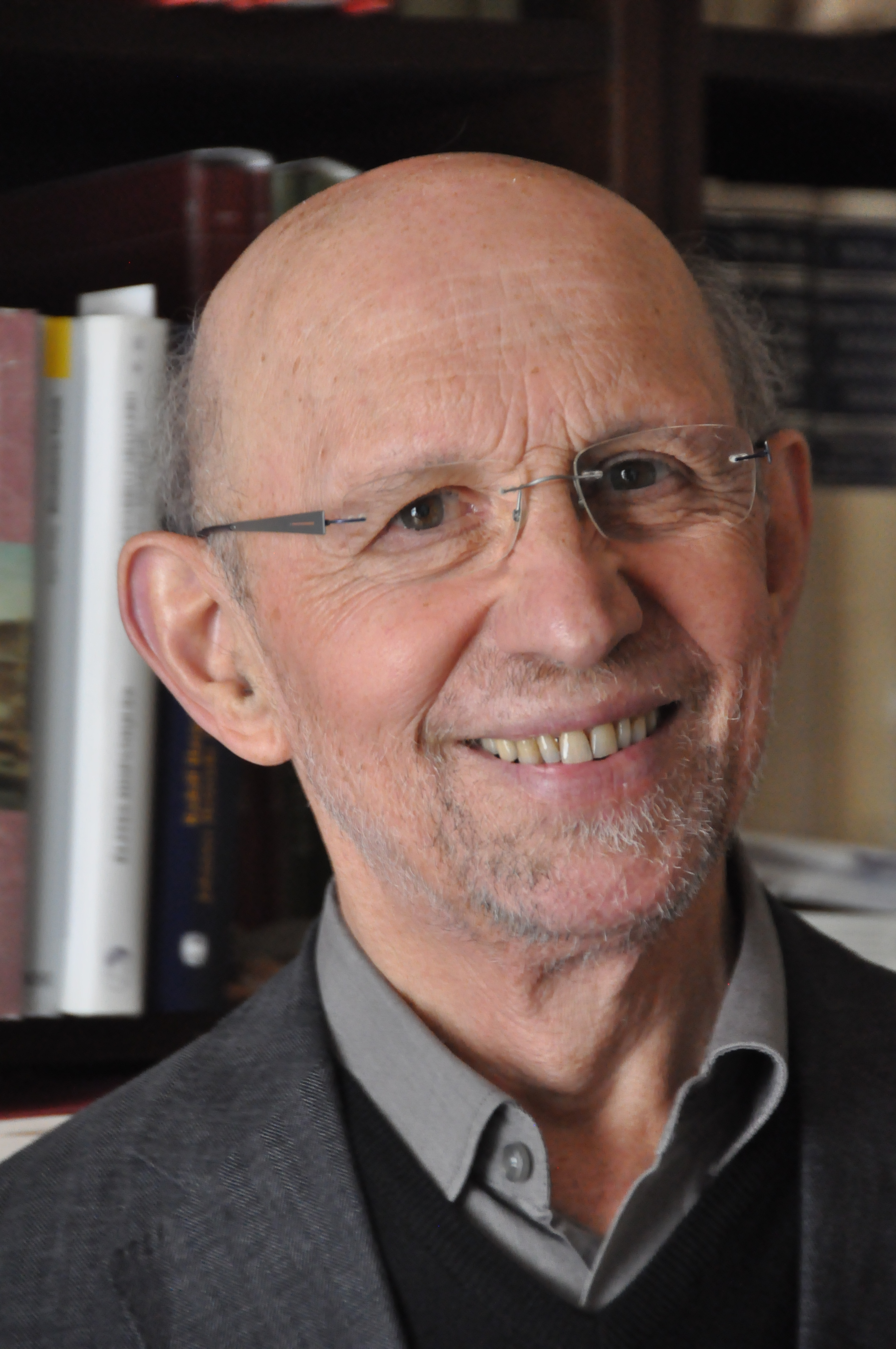
Patrick Le Roux

Patrick Le Roux (born 3 October 1943, in Morlaix) is a French historian.

== Biography ==
=== Career ===
After he obtained his agrégation d'histoire in 1967, Patrick Le Roux defended his State thesis entitled L'armée romaine et l'organisation des provinces ibériques d'Auguste à l'invasion de 409 in March 1980 at the Bordeaux Montaigne University under the direction of Robert Étienne.

A member of the Casa de Velázquez, he taught Roman history at Paris West University Nanterre La Défense then at Toulouse II, Rennes II and Paris XIII of which he is emeritus professor.

He also took part to excavations in Conimbriga (Portugal) and Baelo Claudia (Province of Cádiz) and more specifically in the civil basilica of the forum.

== Contribution to Roman history ==
If he first worked on the Roman army and remained faithful throughout his professional career to the history of Roman Spain and epigraphic sources, Patrick Le Roux brought his analysis and reflection of historian of antiquity to questions as diverse as those related to Latin law, the world of cities, Roman citizenship and Roman western provinces. He actively participated in several important debates within the community, for example on "romanisation". Finally, he has contributed to the systematic inclusion of historiographical constructions in research on Roman history.

His current work focuses on the Roman provincial stories compared to contemporary national models, without neglecting research on the inscriptions, cities and armies of Roman times.

== Honours ==
- Member of the Casa de Velázquez (1970–1973)
- Visiting member of the IAS Princeton in 1986
- Corresponding member of the Real Academia de la Historia (Madrid) (since 1995)
- Docteur Honoris Causa of the University of Porto (2011)

== Bibliography (selection) ==
- 1982: L'armée romaine et l'organisation des provinces ibériques d'Auguste à l'invasion de 409 (publications of the Centre Pierre Paris 8 University), 493 p.
- 1988:Belo V. L’Épigraphie. Les inscriptions romaines de Baelo Claudia (publications of the Casa de Velázquez, series "Archéologie X"), Madrid, 164 p. (in collaboration)
- L'Année Épigraphique, volumes 1981-2010
- 1995: Romains d'Espagne. Cités et politique dans les provinces, Paris, Armand Colin, 182 p. (translation in Spanish, Barcelona, 2006)
- 1998: Le Haut-Empire romain en Occident d'Auguste aux Sévères, Paris, Nouvelle Histoire de l'Antiquité-8, Points-Seuil H 219, 510 pages, (translation in Basque, 2014)
- 1998: Révision de Pliny the Elder, Histoire naturelle. Book III, text established, translated and commentated by H. Zehnacker, Paris, Collection Budé.
- 2005: L’Empire romain, Paris, Que sais-je?, n° 1536, 128 p. (multiple translations)
- 2011: La péninsule Ibérique aux époques romaines, 206 avant J.-C – 409 ap. J.-C., Paris, Armand Colin, 408 p.
- 2011: La Toge et les armes. Rome entre Méditerranée et Océan, Scripta varia 1, Presses Universitaires de Rennes (PUR), 788 p.
- 2012: Mémoires hispaniques. Essai sur la pratique de l’histoire, Madrid, Casa de Velázquez, (series "Essai"), 212 p.
- 2014: Espagne romaines. L’empire dans ses provinces, Scripta varia 2, Rennes, PUR, 712 p.

He is also the author of over 250 scientific articles and contributions in various French and international journals.
