= Nordic Historical Review =

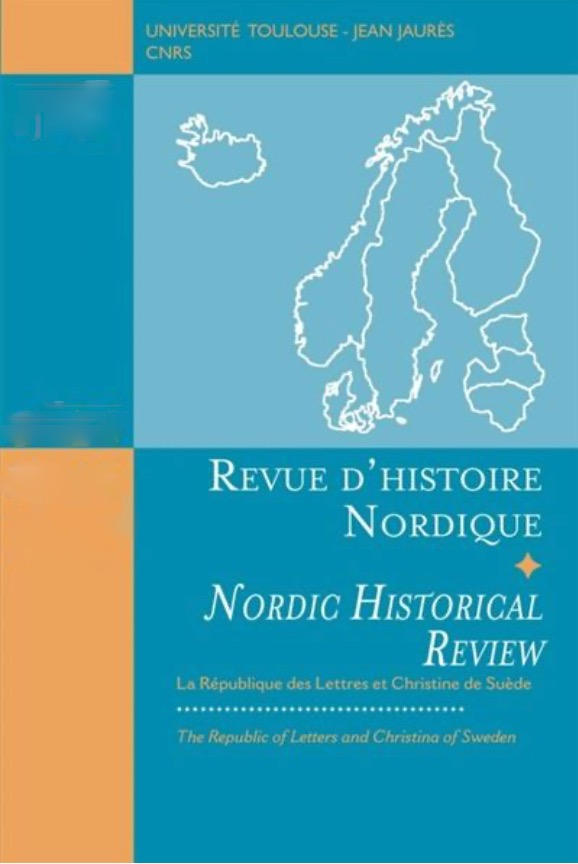
- Discipline: Scandinavian and Baltic history
- Language: French, English
- Edited by: Jean-Marc Olivier

Publication details
- History: 2005–present
- Publisher: Presses Universitaires du Mirail (France)

Standard abbreviations
- ISO 4: Nord. Hist. Rev.

Indexing
- ISSN: 1778-9605
- OCLC no.: 252224774

Links
- Journal homepage; https://shs.cairn.info/revue-d-histoire-nordique-2025-1-page-144?lang=fr

The Nordic Historical Review (French: Revue d'histoire nordique) is a bilingual French-English academic journal dedicated to history. It was founded in 2005 and is published biannually by the Presses Universitaires du Midi (PUM).

Published by Presses Universitaires du Midi and originally released in print format, all issues are currently available online on the Cairn platform.

== Articles ==
- Jean-Marc Olivier, «Grandeur et décadence de "Norwegian Air Shuttle" vue par "Le Monde" (2017-2023)», Revue d'histoire nordique = Nordic historical review, n°30, 2024
- Clerc, L. (2025). Une finlandisation à la finlandaise ? Revue d'histoire nordique, 31(1), 144-158. doi:10.3917/rhn.031.0144.
- Carrez, M. (2025). CLERC (Louis), La Finlande dans la Seconde Guerre mondiale, Paris, Perrin, 2023, 383 p. ISBN 978-2-262-08117-1. Préface de Jean LOPEZ. Revue d'histoire nordique, 31(1), 215-221. doi:10.3917/rhn.031.0215.

== See also ==
- List of history journals
