= Guðbjörg ÍS-46 =

Icelandic freezer trawler

History

Iceland
- Name: Guðbjörg
- Namesake: Guðbjörg Pálsdóttir
- Builder: Flekkefjord Slipp & maskinfabrikk, Norway
- Launched: 1994
- Nickname(s): Guggan
- Fate: Sold in 1999 and renamed Hannover NC-100.

General characteristics
- Class & type: Freezer trawler
- Length: 61.31 m (201.1 ft)

Guðbjörg ÍS-46, commonly known as Guggan, was an Icelandic freezer trawler. Noted for its yellow colour and often called the flagship of the Icelandic fishing fleet, it was at the time the largest and most technical advanced fishing ship in Iceland. The ship's fate and the empty promises made in regards of its sale are often used as the prime example of the consequences that the Icelandic fishing quota system had on the rural parts of Iceland where ships and quotas were bought and transported elsewhere resulting in the financial collapse of the municipalities.

== History ==
Built in Flekkefjord, Norway, for Hrönn ehf., Guðbjörg was delivered in 1994 and replaced an older trawler bearing the same name. In January 1997, the owner of Hrönn ehf. sold the company and Guðbjörgin to Samherji, a major fishing company located in Akureyri. Despite Samherji's CEO, Þorsteinn Már Baldvinsson, promising that "Guggan will remain yellow and have its home port in Ísafjörður" (Icelandic: Guggan verður áfram gul og gerð út frá Ísafirði), the trawler never landed its catch again in Ísafjörður. The quote ended up in popular culture as the epitome of empty promises in Iceland.

In February 1999, the ship was sold to Deutsche Fischfang Union in Germany, a company 99% owned by Samherji, and renamed Hannover NC-100.

In August 2022, the ship was transferred back to Samherji and renamed Snæfell EA.

== In popular culture ==
In the Icelandic drama TV-show Blackport, the trawler Þorbjörg and its fate, that features heavily in the plot, are modeled after Guðbjörg.
