= Jean-Marc Olivier =

French historian (born 1961)

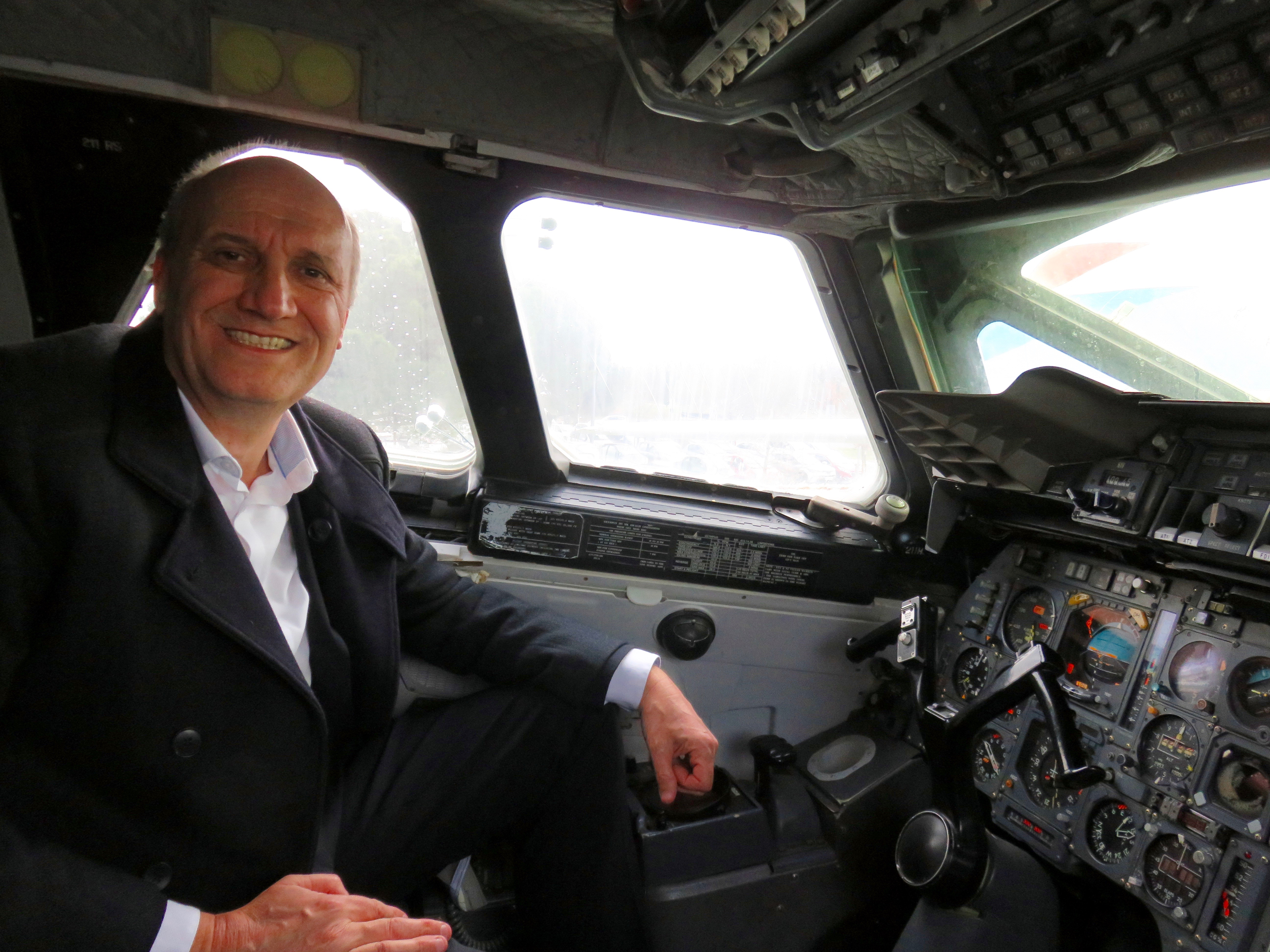
Jean-Marc Olivier

Jean-Marc Olivier (born in 1961) is a French historian specialising in European aviation history, and Professor of Contemporary History at the University of Toulouse Jean-Jaurès.

He is known for his extensive work on the history of aviation and aerospace. He is the founder and director of the bilingual Master's degree of History and Heritage of Aeronautics and Space, based in Toulouse. For the past ten years, he has led a group of researchers working on the theme of "history and heritage of aeronautics and space".

Olivier has published on small industries and industrial heritage, aviation history, and has played a key role in promoting the study of aerospace history. His work has contributed significantly to both academic and public understanding of aviation history and heritage.

Jean-Marc Olivier has presented numerous episodes about the history of aviation on the YouTube channel AeroMasterclass, and in 2025 he was interviewed by french newspaper Les Echos for a documentary about the history of European aircraft manufacturer Airbus.

== Biography and career ==
Olivier holds a doctorate (1998) and a HDR (habilitation à diriger des recherches) in history (2008). He was director of the CNRS research group FRAMESPA from 2005-2013. He was elected Vice-President of International Relations at this university in June 2012, he held the position until 2018.

Olivier's research includes work on small-scale industries in France, Scandinavia, and Switzerland, and more recently on the global aviation industry from its origins to the present day (Toulouse region, Europe and the world). As a leading expert in aviation history, Olivier's research about the European aircraft manufacturer Airbus has featured in the french newspaper les Echos, and on french radio France Bleu.

He coordinates and teaches in the Master's programme History and Heritage of Aeronautics and Space at the University of Toulouse Jean-Jaurès, a selective bilingual (French-English) research programme. Olivier has published numerous books on the history of Latécoère, Airbus, and supersonic French-British airliner the Concorde. He has written many peer-reviewed articles on European history, and serves on editorial boards of academic journals, including the Nordic Historical Review, where he currently holds the position of co-editor in chief, and he also co-founded the aeronautical open access journal Nacelles - Past and Present of Aeronautics and Space.

His published work and research has expanded the understanding of aviation and aerospace history. Because of Jean-Marc Olivier's leadership in founding and developing new higher education programmes and contributing to the public's general knowledge of aviation history through interviews and accessible publications, Olivier is regarded as a leading expert in european aviation history.

== Publications ==
=== Books ===
- Des clous, des horloges et des lunettes. Les campagnards moréziens en industrie [Nails, clocks, and glasses. The countryside near Morez and its industry (1780-1914)], Paris, CTHS, 2004, 608 p. [
- With Jean-Pierre Amalric and Bernadette Suau (eds.), Toulouse, une métropole méridionale : vingt siècles de vie urbaine [Toulouse, a southern metropolis: twenty centuries of urban life], Toulouse, Méridiennes, 2009, deux volumes, 1100 p.
- Une industrie à la campagne. Le canton de Morez entre 1780 et 1914, [An industry in the countryside: the town of Morez 1780-1914] Salins-les-Bains, musée des techniques et cultures comtoises, 2002, 131 p. Received the Lucien Febvre award for history.
- With Natalie Petiteau and Sylvie Caucanas (ed.), Les Européens dans les guerres napoléoniennes [Europeans in the Napoleonic wars], Toulouse, Privat, 2012, 260 p.
- (ed.), Histoire de l'armée de l'air et des forces aériennes françaises du XVIII^{e} siècle à nos jours [History of the French Air Force since the 18th century to the present], Toulouse, Privat, 2014, 552 p.
- With Alain Cortat (eds.), Le profit dans les PME, perspectives historiques, XIX^{e}-XX^{e} siècles, Neuchâtel, Éditions Alphil - Presses universitaires suisses, 2014, 220 p.
- Latécoère. A Hundred Years of Aeronautical Technology, Toulouse, Privat, 2017, 170 p.
- 1969. First Flight of the Concorde, Toulouse, Editions Midi-Pyrénéennes, 2018, 50 p.
- With Rémy Pech (eds.), Histoire de Toulouse et de la métropole, Toulouse, Privat, 2019 (nouvelle édition actualisée en 2024), 800 p.
- 1970. Airbus, naissance d'un géant industriel, Toulouse, Editions Midi-Pyrénéennes, 2020, 50 p.
- (ed.), Le travail en Europe occidentale des années 1830 aux années 1930, Paris, Armand Colin, 2020, 420 p.
- (ed.), Les avions Mauboussin. Une aventure technologique, industrielle et humaine, Toulouse, Privat, 2023, 176 p.
- With Maurice Carrez, Histoire des pays nordiques XIXe-XXe siècle, Paris, Armand Colin, 2023, 400 p.
- With Clair Juilliet, De Blériot à Airbus. Histoire des industries aéronautiques européennes, Paris, Armand Colin - Dunod, 2025, 400 p.

=== Articles ===
- « The Airbus Project Consolidates the Choice of Toulouse as the French Capital of Civil Aeronautics (1917-1970s) », in Nacelles. Past and Present of Aeronautics and Space, n° 11, 2021. https://interfas.univ-tlse2.fr/nacelles/1380
- https://hal.archives-ouvertes.fr/hal-02612957/document [archive]/ American Heritage, November, 2019, Comparison of Aluminum Alloys from Aircraft of Four Nations Involved in the WWII Conflict Using Multiscale Analyses and Archival Study
- Le Monde, December 31, 2008, La Norvège deuxième actionnaire du CAC 40 !
- Bernadotte, Bonaparte, and Louisiana: The Last Dream of a French Empire in North America
- La Norvège et la Suisse face à la construction européenne
- Une frontière transcendée par l'horlogerie : l'Arc jurassien franco-suisse
- Petites entreprises industrielles et développement économique de l'Europe occidentale
- Clair Juilliet, Med Kechidi et Jean-Marc Olivier, « Introduction. Birth and Affirmation of the Airbus Group (1960s-1980s) », Nacelles [En ligne], 11 | 2021, mis en ligne le 10 décembre 2021, consulté le 16 septembre 2025. URL : http://interfas.univ-tlse2.fr/nacelles/1590 - https://interfas.univ-tlse2.fr/nacelles/1590#quotation
- Clair Juilliet et Jean-Marc Olivier, « For a Social and Cultural History of Aeronautics in the Twentieth Century », Nacelles [En ligne], 1 | 2016, mis en ligne le 01 novembre 2016, consulté le 16 septembre 2025. URL : http://interfas.univ-tlse2.fr/nacelles/119 - https://interfas.univ-tlse2.fr/nacelles/119#quotation
