= Guðbjörg Vilhjálmsdóttir =

Icelandic academic

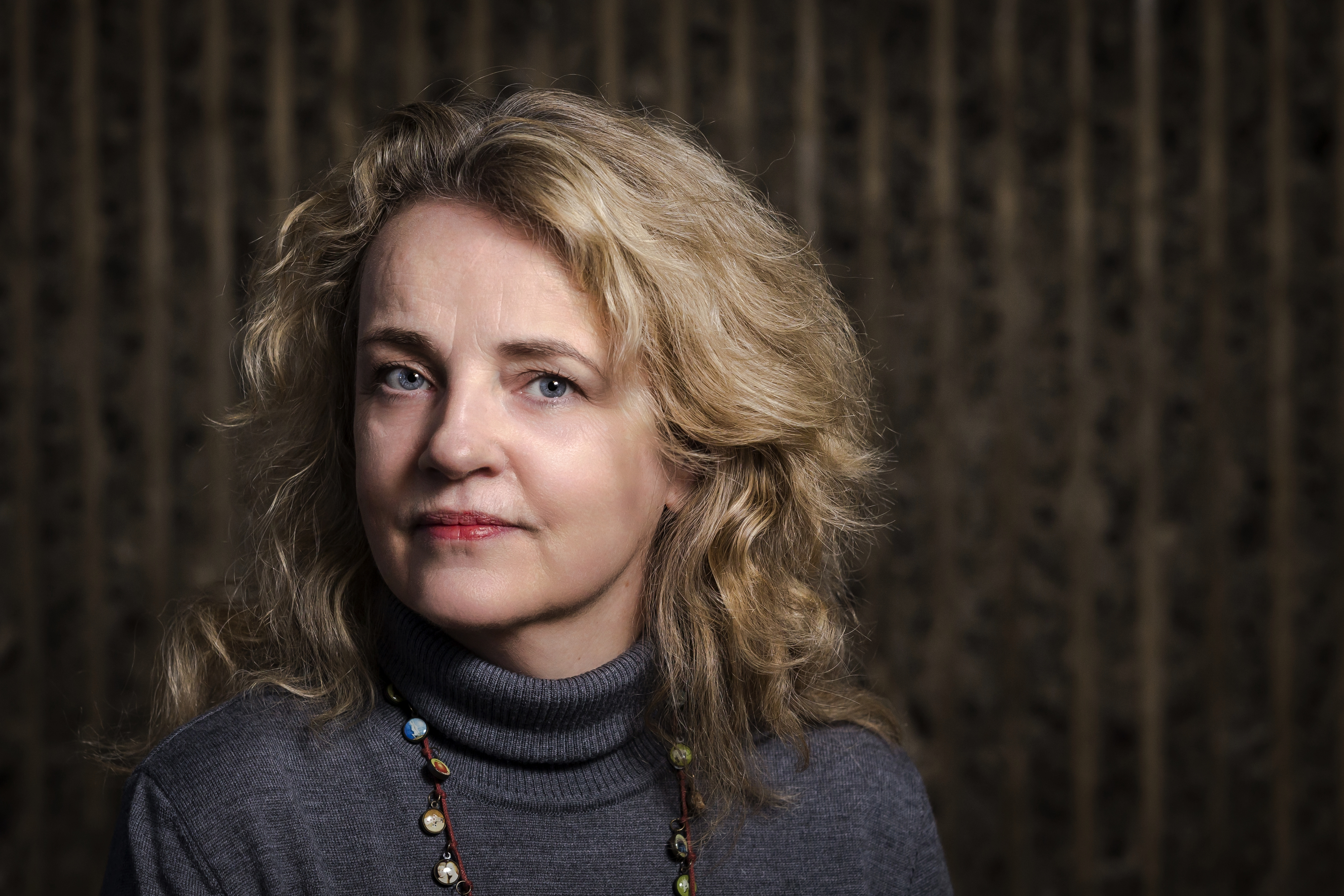
- Born: 1956 (age 69–70)
- Occupation: professor at the University of Iceland

Guðbjörg Vilhjálmsdóttir is a professor in Career Guidance and Counselling on the Faculty of Sociology, Anthropology and Folkloristics at the University of Iceland.

== Education and professional positions ==
Guðbjörg received a BA degree in 1982 in Educational Science and Philosophy from the University of Iceland. A year later, she received her Teacher's Diploma from the same university. In 1979, she had completed a diploma in French from the University of Toulouse-Le Mirail in France. She received a post-graduate diploma in 1985 in school counselling from the University of Lyon in France and a master's degree in Educational Science in 1987 from Université Paris V - La Sorbonne. Guðbjörg defended her PhD thesis from the University of Hertfordshire in England in 2004 and was awarded the degree that same year. Guðbjörg began training counsellors at the department of guidance and counselling at the University of Iceland from the year 1988 and was hired as program director in 1991. In 1999, she became an assistant professor in career guidance and counselling. She was promoted in 2005 to the position of associate professor and in 2010 to the position of professor. From 1991 to 2006, Guðbjörg was the only permanent teacher in the discipline. From 1994, she pursued doctoral studies while working full-time. Guðbjörg is now a professor in Career Guidance and Counselling on the Faculty of Sociology, Anthropology and Folkloristics.

== Research ==
Guðbjörg has written numerous articles, book chapters and textbooks. Her research projects focus on career development from various perspectives, on methods in narrative career counselling, and on the evaluation of career education and counselling. In addition, she has conducted two extensive research projects on the social aspects of occupational thinking and career choice, based on habitus theory. She has also examined the effect of gender on people's careers. She has participated in international research groups, such as one that developed a psychometric instrument to measure career adaptability (2008–2012). Since 2017, Guðbjörg has been in a research group within a UNESCO's Unitwin network on the perception of work and future career among low-qualified youth. Along with her husband, Professor Torfi H. Tulinius of the University of Iceland, Guðbjörg developed a literary method to analyse narratives in counselling. She has written academic articles about it, among them the journal article “Tales of two ’s subjects: Narratives of career counseling”. In addition, Guðbjörg has received national and international research and development grants. She adapted and translated the course material Many Choices. This is curricular material in career education intended for adolescents. The National Centre for Educational Materials published it in 1993–1996. An evaluation study of this career education material, conducted by Guðbjörg, revealed considerable success in how fifteen-year-old youths think about jobs, compared to those receiving no career education.

== Leadership and accolades ==
Both the university and other organisations have entrusted Guðbjörg with positions of confidentiality. Guðbjörg has led research and policy projects within the field of guidance and counselling for both the Ministry of Education, Science and Culture and the City of Reykjavik. Guðbjörg was on the Board of Directors of the School of Social Sciences from 2016 to 2018. She was Dean of the Faculty of Sociology, Anthropology and Folkloristics from 2016 to 2018 and a member of the Board of Directors of the Social Science Research Institute. Guðbjörg is now a member of the Board of Directors of the University of Iceland Student Achievement and Incentive Fund. She headed the Centre of Lifelong Guidance Expertise (Sérfræðisetur í ævilangri náms- og starfsráðgjöf) from 2009 to 2014. Its main functions were a joint Nordic research project on counselling adults (Voice of Users), collaboration with the Ministry of Education, Science and Culture on policy formulation for school and career counselling, and the design and development of the information and counselling website. The Voice of Users project is the first comparative research on school and career counselling in the Nordic countries. Guðbjörg was chair of the Icelandic Educational Counsellors Association (Félag íslenskra námsráðgjafa) 1987 to 1999. The association recognised her contribution in 2006 and made her an honorary member of the Icelandic Educational Counsellors Association in 2016 for her work on behalf of the profession.

Guðbjörg has been active in international collaboration, receiving the National Career Development Association's (NCDA) International Award in 2006 for her work on educating school and career counsellors and policy work. The NCDA is the most important association in the United States for career counselling, and it is part of the American Counseling Association. She is on the Board of Directors of the European Society for Vocational Design and Counselling, which supports research in school and career counselling, including courses for doctoral students. Guðbjörg is on the editorial board (directrice adjointe) of Orientation Scolaire et Professionnelle, which is the main research journal for school and career counselling in France. In 2017, Guðbjörg was elected on the board of the International Association for Educational and Vocational Guidance, which is the only international association in the field of school and career counselling. Guðbjörg is currently vice-president of the International Association for Educational and Vocational Guidance.

== Articles ==
- Guðbjörg Vilhjálmsdóttir og Guðmundur B. Arnkelsson (2013). Social aspects of career choice from the perspective of habitus theory. Journal of Vocational Behavior, 83, 581−590.
- Guðbjörg Vilhjálmsdóttir og Guðmundur B. Arnkelsson (2007). Les differénces liées au sexe dans les représentations professionnelles. Orientation scolaire et professionnelle, 36, 421–434.
- Guðbjörg Vilhjálmsdóttir, Guðrún Birna Kjartansdóttir, Sigríður Bríet Smáradóttir og Sif Einarsdóttir (2012). Career adapt-abilities scale – Icelandic form: Psychometric properties and construct validity. Journal of Vocational Behavior, 80, 698−704.
- Guðbjörg Vilhjálmsdóttir. (2007). Outcomes of two different methods in career education. Journal of Educational and Vocational Guidance, 7, 97–110.

== Book and book chapters ==
- Guðbjörg Vilhjálmsdóttir (1993–1996). Margt er um að velja. Starfsfræði handa efstu bekkjum grunnskóla ásamt kennsluleiðbeiningum með vinnubókunum: Könnun á atvinnulífinu. Að átta sig á skólakerfinu. Fyrirætlanir mínar. Reykjavík. Félagsvísindastofnun.
- Guðbjörg Vilhjálmsdóttir. (2017). Career changes on the horizon: The importance of group norms in interpreting results of career adaptability measures. Í K. Maree (ed.). Psychology of career adaptability, employability and resilience, 375−396. Cham, Switzerland: Springer.
