= Hrund Ólöf Andradóttir =

Icelandic academic

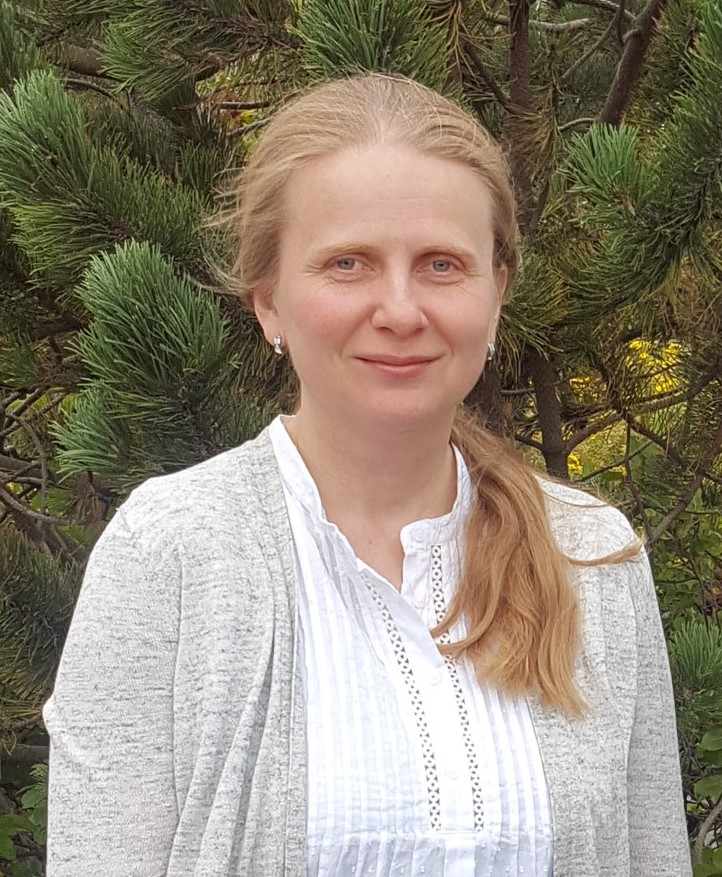
- Occupations: professor in Civil and Environmental Engineering at the University of Iceland

Hrund Ólöf Andradóttir is the first woman to hold the position of professor in Civil and Environmental Engineering in Iceland.

== Professional experience ==
Hrund completed her matriculation examination from Hamrahlid College in 1990 from the physics track. She graduated in 1994 from the University of Iceland with a B.Sc. in Civil Engineering with emphasis on water engineering. She then entered graduate studies at Ralph M. Parsons Laboratory at the Massachusetts Institute of Technology (MIT) in Boston, USA. In 2000, Hrund became the first Icelandic woman to complete a doctorate in Civil and Environmental Engineering and the 10th Icelandic woman to complete a doctorate in engineering. After completing her studies, she worked for six years at Mars & Co. in the United States as a management consultant. Hrund began her academic career with a permanent position at the Faculty of Civil and Environmental Engineering at the University of Iceland in 2006. In 2016, she became the first woman professor in the field of Civil and Environmental Engineering at the University of Iceland and the third woman professor in the Faculty of Civil Engineering at the University of Iceland. Hrund specialises in the causes, distribution, and consequences of environmental pollution. She has conducted diverse research that has contributed to an improved understanding of physics of water systems in northerly regions, and promoted environmental quality and a sustainable urban community. Hrund has served many positions of confidentiality. For example, she chaired the Water and Wastewater Association of Iceland and the University of Iceland's Planning Committee.

== Water engineering research ==
In her final project at the University of Iceland, Hrund investigated how bridging might affect the hydrology and biology in Hvalfjörður. Dr. Gunnar Guðni Tómasson was her adviser. At MIT, Hrund researched the thermodynamics of natural water systems and the role of shallow wetlands in transferring waterborne pollution towards the surface of lakes. Her adviser was Professor Heidi Nepf. Hrund initiated research on the physical behaviour of deep lakes in the sub-Arctic in cooperation with Francisco Rueda at the University of Granada and funding from Landsvirkjun Energy Research Fund. Results from field campaigns and three-dimensional modelling highlighted highly unstable conditions and large scale internal fluctuations in Lake Lagarfljót which are attributable to high winds, low air temperature, and glacial riverine inflows. Hrund, in cooperation with Bernard Laval at the University of British Columbia and Alexander Forrest at the University of California, Davis, also researched the fate of glacial underground river water in Lake Þingvallavatn. In addition Hrund has also investigated the impact of water withdrawal practices on the residence time of anthropogenic compounds in a reservoir used both for water supply and hydropower generation. In addition, Hrund has participated in water quality studies of small water supplies in Iceland, led by María Jóna Gunnarsdóttir and Sigurður Magnús Garðarsson at the University of Iceland.

== Environmental quality and sustainable cities in cold climates ==
Hrund is one of Iceland's leading specialists on the hydrological functionality of blue-green stormwater solutions urban areas. Hrund assessed the influence of wind on the settling pond treatment performance of heavy metals in a project supported by the Environmental and Energy Research Fund of Reykjavik Energy. She analysed the seasonal hydrological performance and the visual appearance of extensive green roofs. In addition, Hrund researched trends in rainfall intensity and the potential flooding hazard in Reykjavik City Centre due to global warming. She reviewed the key factors for a successful implementation of blue-green stormwater solutions in cold climate. Currently, Hrund is researching the capacity of vegetated swales to transmit and mitigate winter rain on snow floods in the environmentally certified Urriðaholt Neighbourhood. The research is supported by The Icelandic Centre for Research.

In recent years, Hrund has turned her attention to air quality in Reykjavik. She assessed the environmental footprint of hydrogen sulfide emissions from geothermal plants and volcanic ash from Eyjafjallajökull (Island Mountain Glacier) in collaboration with Sigurður Magnús Garðarsson and Snjólaug Ólafsdóttir, now managing directors of Andrými Consultancy. Þröstur Þorsteinsson and they have analysed the severity of fireworks pollution and have called for measures to curb the pollution. Hrund is researching the concentration of black carbon (soot) in Reykjavik, which consists of fine particles in automobile emissions that can harm human health, for example, causing cancer. Hrund, in collaboration with Larry Anderson, professor emeritus at the University of Colorado in Denver, is researching hydrogen sulphide pollution in Reykjavik.

== Personal life ==
Hrund is the daughter of Guðfinna Svava Sigurjónsdóttir, art historian and teacher, and Andri Ísaksson, professor in pedagogy at the University of Iceland and head of Upper Secondary Education and Vocational Education in the headquarters of the United Nations Educational, Scientific and Cultural Organization, UNESCO. Andri was the son of Ísak Jónsson, a trailblazer in schooling and founder of the school Skóli Ísaks Jónssonar, and Sigrún Sigurjónsdóttir, teacher at the same school. Svava is the daughter of Sigurjón Sigurðarson, shopkeeper, and Sigrún Jónsdóttir, batik artist. Hrund's siblings are Sigrún Andradóttir, professor in industrial engineering, Þór Ísak Andrason, industrial engineer, and Hjalti Sigurjón Andrason, biologist.
