= Aradóttir =

Aradóttir is a patronymic feminine Icelandic surname, literally meaning "daughter of Ari"". Notable people with the surname include:

- Guðbjörg Aradóttir (fl. 2020s), Icelandic entomologist
- Helga Aradóttir (1538–1614), Icelandic person
