= Arnardóttir =

Arnardóttir is an Icelandic feminine surname. Notable people with the surname include:

- Elsa Lára Arnardóttir (born 1975), Icelandic politician
- Erla Steina Arnardóttir (born 1983), Icelandic footballer
- Guðrún Arnardóttir (footballer) (born 1995), Icelandic footballer
- Guðrún Arnardóttir (hurdler) (born 1971), Icelandic hurdler
