= Guðbjörg Linda Rafnsdóttir =

Icelandic academic

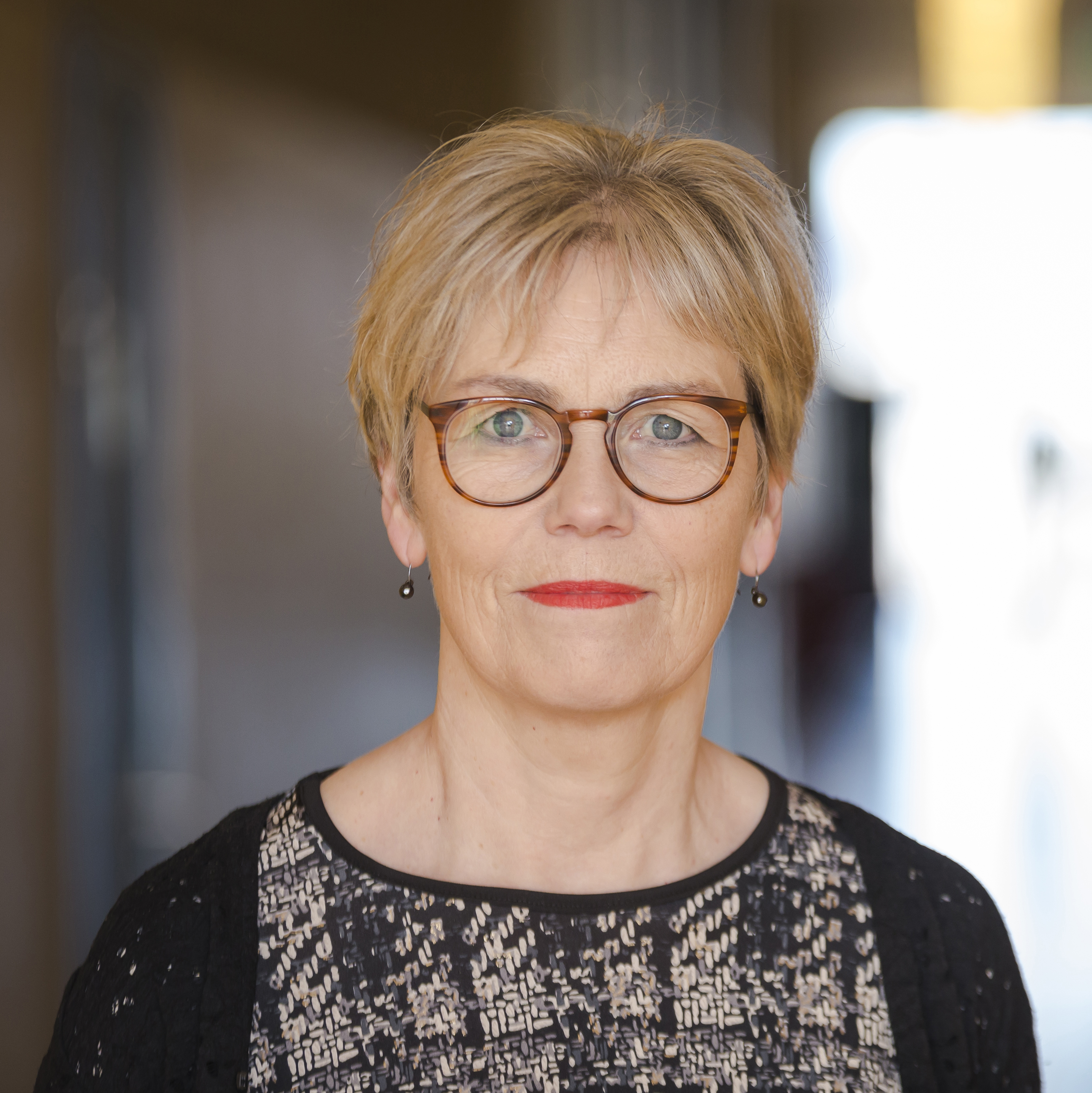
- Guðbjörg Linda Rafnsdóttir (2018)
- Born: 1957 (age 68–69)
- Occupations: Professor of sociology, Pro-rector of science at the University of Iceland

Guðbjörg Linda Rafnsdóttir (born 1957) is a professor of sociology and the pro-rector of science at the University of Iceland.

== Career ==
Guðbjörg Linda Rafnsdóttir completed a BA in sociology and teaching certification from the University of Iceland in 1984, an MA in sociology from Lund University in Sweden in 1990 and a PhD from the same university in 1995. From 1994 to 2007, she was head of the Education Department and later programme director at the Research and Health Department of the Administration of Occupational Health and Safety where she conducted research into the working conditions and wellbeing of various professional groups.

Guðbjörg Linda Rafnsdóttir is currently a professor of sociology at the Faculty of Sociology, Anthropology and Folkloristics. Since 2016 she is also Pro-Rector of Science.

== Research ==
Guðbjörg Linda Rafnsdóttir's research spans a broad field within the sociology of work, well-being and gender. She has taken part in a wide range of Icelandic and international research projects and is an affiliate of the Center for Research on Gender in STEMM at the University of California San Diego.

Some of Guðbjörg's earliest research focused on the gender divide in the labour market and the Icelandic labour movement. Her doctoral thesis, "Women's Strategies for overcoming Subordination – A discussion of Women's Unions in Iceland" (Swedish: Kvinnofack eller integrering som strategi mot underordning – Om kvinnliga fackföreningar på Island), discussed the gender divide in the Icelandic labour movement and its impact on the position of women in the labour market. Her research focus later shifted considerably towards occupational health and wellbeing. She has also explored gender segregation in labour and the impact of information technology and online work on work arrangement and well-being. In recent years, she has conducted a significant amount of research into the position of gender in academia and business leadership, gender quotas, the interplay between family and work responsibilities, and time as an instrument of power.

== Management and leadership ==
Over the years, Guðbjörg Linda Rafnsdóttir has taken on many positions of trust at the University of Iceland and elsewhere. For example, she was the first female president of the Nordic Sociological Association and is also an honorary member of the Icelandic Sociological Association. She has been director of the Graduate School at the University of Iceland since 2016, a member of the University Science Committee since 2014 and chair of the Committee since 2015. She was head of the Faculty of Social and Human Sciences from 2008 to 2013 and sat on the board of the Social Science Research Institute from 2008 to 2013, chairing the board from 2009. She sat on the board of the University of Iceland School of Social Sciences. She was also chair of the Ethics Committee for the UI Faculty of Social Science from 2007 to 2010 and is currently a member of the Icelandic Committee on Good Practices in Science. Guðbjörg has been at the editorial board for Acta Sociologica and for the Nordic Journal of Working Life Studies. She has also served on Icelandic and Nordic review panels. She was on the board of the Nordic Gender Institute NIKK 2006–2009, and she sits on the board for the research network NORDICORE.

== Childhood and personal life ==
Gudbjörg Linda Rafnsdóttir's parents were Helena Hálfdanardóttir, nursing auxiliary (1935–2014) and Rafn Benediktsson, employer (1935–2009). She is married to Stefán Jóhann Stefánsson, economist and political scientist. They have three sons: Hlynur Orri Stefánsson PhD, Arnaldur Smári Stefánsson PhD and Davíð Már Stefánsson MFA.
