= Guðbjörg Aradóttir =

Icelandic entomologist

Guðbjörg Inga Aradóttir FRES is an Icelandic entomologist and researcher at the National Institute of Agricultural Botany (NIAB) in the UK. Her work identifies novel crop protection solutions against insect agricultural pests and the diseases they transmit. She is particularly known for her research on plant resistance to cereal aphids and the Barley Yellow Dwarf Virus

Guðbjörg has previously worked at the Natural History Museum in London and the Icelandic Institute of Natural History. She is a fellow and trustee of the Royal Entomological Society. In 2021 she founded Mamore Research and Innovation Limited, a consulting firm that provides services to public and private organizations in research and experimental development on natural sciences and engineering. Some of her work has been used to help farm sustainable and resilient crops without the use of pesticides in regions susceptible to insect pests that threaten crop growth.

One of her publications, Common resistance mechanisms are deployed by plants against sap-feeding herbivorous insects: insights from a meta-analysis and systematic review suggests that insect-resistant plants in the same plant family exhibit the same defense mechanisms to repel certain insects. Phenotypes generally include a higher content of organic chemicals and density of trichomes on leaves that repel sap-sucking insects, which utilize stylets to puncture the plant's tissue and suck out its nutrients.
