= List of schools in Iceland =

This is a list of schools in Iceland, which encompasses institutions from playschool to gymnasium.

== Playschools ==
Playschool is non-compulsory education for those under the age of six and is the first step in the education system.

== Primary schools ==
Primary school is compulsory education for those aged 6 to 16 and is the second step in the education system. There were a total of 45.195 students in Icelandic primary schools in 2017.

Primary school	Number of students (2017)
Akurskóli	516
Alþjóðaskólinn á Íslandi	89
Andakílsskóli	
Auðarskóli	87
Austurbæjarskóli	413
Álfhólsskóli	643
Álftamýrarskóli	
Álftanesskóli	410
Árbæjarskóli	640
Árskógarskóli	21
Árskóli	342
Ártúnsskóli	189
Ásgarðsskóli	
Áslandsskóli	504
Barnaskóli Bárðdæla	
Barnaskóli Hjallastefnunnar Reykjanesbæ	
Barnaskóli Hjallastefnunnar Reykjavík	116
Barnaskóli Hjallastefnunnar við Hjallabraut	88
Barnaskóli Hjallastefnunnar á Vífilsstöðum	67
Barnaskóli Ólafsfjarðar	
Barnaskóli Vestmannaeyja	
Barnaskólinn á Eyrarbakka og Stokkseyri	127
Bíldudalsskóli	35
Bláskógaskóli - Laugarvatni	51
Bláskógaskóli - Reykholti	81
Borgarhólsskóli	281
Borgaskóli	
Brautarholts- og Gnúpverjaskóli	
Brautarholtsskóli	
Breiðagerðisskóli	378
Breiðholtsskóli	386
Brekkubæjarskóli	449
Brekkuskóli	509
Broddanesskóli	
Brúarásskóli	42
Brúarskóli	29
Dalbrautarskóli	
Dalskóli	236
Dalvíkurskóli	215
Digranesskóli	
Einholtsskóli	
Engidalsskóli	
Engjaskóli	
Fellaskóli (Fellabæ)	101
Fellaskóli (Reykjavík)	350
Finnbogastaðaskóli	2
Flataskóli	499
Fljótshlíðarskóli	
Flóaskóli	107
Flúðaskóli	99
Foldaskóli	501
Fossvogsskóli	373
Framsýn - menntun	49
Gagnfræðaskólinn Ólafsfirði	
Garðaskóli	523
Gaulverjaskóli	
Gerðaskóli	215
Giljaskóli	400
Glerárskóli	314
Gnúpverjaskóli	
Grandaskóli	335
Grenivíkurskóli	47
Grundaskóli	629
Grunnskóli Bláskógabyggðar / Bláskógaskóli	
Grunnskóli Djúpavogs / Djúpavogsskóli	66
Grunnskóli Mýrdalshrepps / Víkurskóli	54
Grunnskóli Vesturbyggðar / Patreksskóli	96
Grunnskóli Akrahrepps	
Grunnskóli Bolungarvíkur	142
Grunnskóli Borgarfjarðar	186
Grunnskóli Borgarfjarðar eystri	5
Grunnskóli Dalvíkurbyggðar	
Grunnskóli Fáskrúðsfjarðar	95
Grunnskóli Fjallabyggðar	198
Grunnskóli Grindavíkur	494
Grunnskóli Grundarfjarðar	86
Grunnskóli Hornafjarðar	252
Grunnskóli Húnaþings vestra	152
Grunnskóli Mjóafjarðar	
Grunnskóli Reyðarfjarðar	179
Grunnskóli Seltjarnarness	524
Grunnskóli Siglufjarðar	
Grunnskóli Snæfellsbæjar	229
Grunnskóli Vestmannaeyja	520
Grunnskóli Önundarfjarðar	18
Grunnskólinn Suðureyri / Suðureyrarskóli	39
Grunnskólinn að Hólum	
Grunnskólinn austan Vatna	64
Grunnskólinn á Blönduósi / Blönduskóli	126
Grunnskólinn á Bakkafirði	
Grunnskólinn á Borðeyri	
Grunnskólinn á Drangsnesi	7
Grunnskólinn á Eskifirði	141
Grunnskólinn á Hellissandi	
Grunnskólinn á Hellu	130
Grunnskólinn á Hólmavík	52
Grunnskólinn á Ísafirði	355
Grunnskólinn á Laugarvatni	
Grunnskólinn á Raufarhöfn	13
Grunnskólinn á Stöðvarfirði	18
Grunnskólinn á Tálknafirði	33
Grunnskólinn á Þórshöfn	68
Grunnskólinn Egilsstöðum og Eiðum / Egilsstaðaskóli	349
Grunnskólinn Hofsósi	
Grunnskólinn í Austur-Landeyjum	
Grunnskólinn í Grímsey / Grímseyjarskóli	4
Grunnskólinn í Hrísey / Hríseyjarskóli	11
Grunnskólinn í Svalbarðshreppi / Svalbarðsskóli	
Grunnskólinn í Borgarnesi	279
Grunnskólinn í Breiðdalshreppi	16
Grunnskólinn í Búðardal	
Grunnskólinn í Hofgarði	11
Grunnskólinn í Hveragerði	353
Grunnskólinn í Ólafsfirði	
Grunnskólinn í Ólafsvík	
Grunnskólinn í Sandgerði	246
Grunnskólinn í Stykkishólmi	160
Grunnskólinn í Þorlákshöfn	225
Grunnskólinn Ljósaborg	
Grunnskólinn Tjarnarlundi	
Grunnskólinn Þingeyri	27
Hafnarskóli	
Hafralækjarskóli	
Hagaskóli	548
Hamarsskóli Vestmannaeyjum	
Hamraskóli	153
Háaleitisskóli	543
Háaleitisskóli (Reykjanesbæ)	245
Háteigsskóli	450
Heiðarskóli (Leirársveit)	90
Heiðarskóli (Reykjanesbæ)	418
Heppuskóli	
Hjallaskóli	
Hlíðarhúsaskóli	
Hlíðarskóli	20
Hlíðaskóli	469
Hofsstaðaskóli	556
Holtaskóli	447
Hólabrekkuskóli	502
Hrafnagilsskóli	133
Hraunvallaskóli	818
Hrollaugsstaðaskóli	
Húnavallaskóli	42
Húsabakkaskóli	
Húsaskóli	166
Hvaleyrarskóli	409
Hvassaleitisskóli	
Hvolsskóli	225
Höfðaskóli	84
Hörðuvallaskóli	903
Ingunnarskóli	391
Kársnesskóli	571
Kelduskóli	367
Kerhólsskóli	41
Kirkjubæjarskóli	43
Kleppjárnsreykjaskóli	
Klettaskóli	123
Klébergsskóli	122
Korpuskóli	
Kópaskersskóli	
Kópavogsskóli	351
Krikaskóli	106
Landakotsskóli	237
Langholtsskóli	640
Laugalandsskóli í Holtum	76
Laugalækjarskóli	312
Laugargerðisskóli	17
Laugarnesskóli	508
Lágafellsskóli	707
Lindaskóli	483
Litlulaugaskóli	
Ljósafossskóli	
Lundarskóli	464
Lýsuhólsskóli	
Lækjarskóli	525
Meðferðaheimilið á Torfastöðum	
Melaskóli	628
Myllubakkaskóli	329
Mýrarhúsaskóli	
Naustaskóli	392
Nesjaskóli	
Nesskóli	207
Njarðvíkurskóli	409
Norðlingaskóli	594
Oddeyrarskóli	196
Reykholtsskóli	
Reykhólaskóli	47
Reykjahlíðarskóli	33
Réttarholtsskóli	399
Rimaskóli	507
Safamýrarskóli	
Salaskóli	571
Sandvíkurskóli	
Selásskóli	228
Seljalandsskóli	
Seljaskóli	642
Setbergsskóli	416
Seyðisfjarðarskóli	65
Síðuskóli	382
Sjálandsskóli	279
Skarðshlíðarskóli	94
Skóli Ísaks Jónssonar	199
Smáraskóli	392
Snælandsskóli	444
Sólgarðaskóli	
Sólvallaskóli	
Stapaskóli	
Steinsstaðaskóli	
Stóru-Vogaskóli	173
Stórutjarnaskóli	39
Suðurhlíðarskóli	43
Sunnulækjarskóli	662
Súðavíkurskóli	23
Sæmundarskóli	462
Tjarnarskóli	54
Valhúsaskóli	
Vallaskóli	575
Valsárskóli	48
Varmahlíðarskóli	109
Varmalandsskóli	
Varmárskóli	859
Vatnsendaskóli	591
Vesturbæjarskóli	350
Vesturhlíðarskóli	
Villingaholtsskóli	
Víðistaðaskóli	711
Víkurskóli	
Vogaskóli	314
Vopnafjarðarskóli	88
Vættaskóli	473
Waldorfskólinn Lækjarbotnum	77
Waldorfskólinn Sólstafir	70
Ölduselsskóli	462
Öldutúnsskóli	532
Öskjuhlíðarskóli	
Öxarfjarðarskóli	24
Þelamerkurskóli	72
Þingborgarskóli	
Þingeyjarskóli	68
Þjórsárskóli	47
Þykkvabæjarskóli	

=== Defunct ===
Name	Municipality	Region	Year closed
Hallormsstaðarskóli	Múlaþing	East Iceland	2015

== Gymnasiums ==
Gymnasium is non-compulsory education for those over the age of 16 and is the third step in the education system. There are 34 gymnasiums in Iceland.

English name (Icelandic name)	Municipality	Region	Ownership
Akureyri Comprehensive College (Verkmenntaskólinn á Akureyri)	Akureyrarkaupstaður	Northeastern Region	Public
Akureyri Junior College (Menntaskólinn á Akureyri)	Akureyrarkaupstaður	Northeastern Region	Public
Armuli Gymnasium (Fjölbrautaskólinn við Ármúla)	Reykjavíkurborg	Capital Region	Public
Austurland Gymnasium (Verkmenntaskóli Austurlands)	Fjarðabyggð	Eastern Region	Public
Austur-Skaftafellssysla Gymnasium (Framhaldsskólinn í Austur-Skaftafellssýslu)	Sveitarfélagið Hornafjörður	Southern Region	Public
Borgarfjodur Gymnasium (Menntaskóli Borgarfjarðar)	Borgarbyggð	Western Region	Public
Borgarholt Gymnasium (Borgarholtsskóli)	Reykjavíkurborg	Capital Region	Public
Breidholt College (Fjölbrautaskólinn í Breiðholti)	Reykjavíkurborg	Capital Region	Public
Commercial College of Iceland (Verzlunarskóli Íslands)	Reykjavíkurborg	Capital Region	Private
Comprehensive Secondary School of West Iceland (Fjölbrautaskóli Vesturlands)	Akraneskaupstaður	Western Region	Public
Egilsstadir Upper Secondary School (Menntaskólinn á Egilsstöðum)	Fljótsdalshreppur	Eastern Region	Public
Flensborg College (Flensborgarskólinn í Hafnarfirði)	Hafnarfjarðarkaupstaður	Capital Region	Public
Gardabaer College (Fjölbrautaskólinn í Garðabæ)	Garðabær	Capital Region	Public
Hamrahlid College (Menntaskólinn við Hamrahlíð)	Reykjavíkurborg	Capital Region	Public
Handicraft and Homemaking School of Hallormsstadur (Handverks- og hússtjórnarskólinn á Hallormsstað)	Fljótsdalshreppur	Eastern Region	Private
Homemaking School of Reykjavik (Hússtjórnarskóli Reykjavíkur)	Reykjavíkurborg	Capital Region	Private
Husavik Secondary College (Framhaldsskólinn á Húsavík)	Norðurþing	Northeastern Region	Public
Icelandic College of Fisheries (Fisktækniskóli Íslands)	Grindavíkurbær	Southern Peninsula	Private
Isafjordur Gymnasium (Menntaskólinn á Ísafirði)	Ísafjarðarbær	Westfjords	Public
Kopavogur Grammar School (Menntaskólinn í Kópavogi)	Kópavogsbær	Capital Region	Public
Laugar Junior College (Framhaldsskólinn á Laugum)	Þingeyjarsveit	Northeastern Region	Public
Laugarvatn Gymnasium (Menntaskólinn að Laugarvatni)	Bláskógabyggð	Southern Region	Public
Reykjavik Junior College (Menntaskólinn í Reykjavík)	Reykjavíkurborg	Capital Region	Public
Saudarkrokur Comprehensive College (Fjölbrautaskóli Norðurlands vestra)	Sveitarfélagið Skagafjörður	Northwestern Region	Public
Snaefellsnes Upper Secondary Comprehensive School (Fjölbrautaskóli Snæfellinga)	Grundarfjarðarbær	Western Region	Public
South Iceland Comprehensive School (Fjölbrautaskóli Suðurlands)	Sveitarfélagið Árborg	Southern Region	Public
Sudurnes Comprehensive College (Fjölbrautaskóli Suðurnesja)	Reykjanesbær	Southern Peninsula	Public
Sund Grammar School (Menntaskólinn við Sund)	Reykjavíkurborg	Capital Region	Public
Technical College of Hafnarfjordur (Iðnskólinn í Hafnarfirði)	Hafnarfjarðarkaupstaður	Capital Region	Public
Technical College Reykjavik (Tækniskólinn)	Reykjavíkurborg	Capital Region	Private
Trollaskagi Gymnasium (Menntaskólinn á Tröllaskaga)	Fjallabyggð	Northeastern Region	Public
Upper Secondary School of Mosfellsbaer (Framhaldsskólinn í Mosfellsbæ)	Mosfellsbær	Capital Region	Public
Vestmannaeyjar Gymnasium; Framhaldsskólinn í Vestmannaeyjum	Vestmannaeyjabær	Southern Region	Public
Reykjavik Women's Gymnasium (Kvennaskólinn í Reykjavík)	Reykjavíkurborg	Capital Region	Public

=== Defunct ===
English name (Icelandic name)	Municipality	Region	Ownership
Hradbraut Gymnasium (Menntaskólinn Hraðbraut)	Reykjavíkurborg	Capital Region	Private

== See also ==
- Education in Iceland
- List of universities in Iceland
