= Government agencies in Iceland =

The government agencies in Iceland are state controlled organisations which act independently to carry out the policies of the Icelandic government.

== Parliament ==
=== Agencies ===
- Althing Ombudsman (Umboðsmaður Alþingis)
- Icelandic National Audit Office (Ríkisendurskoðun)

=== Committees ===
- Electoral Commission (Landskjörstjórn)

== Prime Minister's Office ==
=== Agencies ===
- Office of the Attorney General (Ríkislögmaður)
- Office of the Ombudsman for Children (Umboðsmaður barna)
- Thingvellir National Park (Þjóðgarðurinn á Þingvöllum)

== Ministry of Education, Science and Culture ==
=== Agencies ===
- Archaeological Heritage Agency of Iceland (Fornleifavernd ríkisins)
- National Archives of Iceland (Þjóðskjalasafn Íslands)

=== Education ===
- Playschools
- Primary schools
- Gymnasia
- Further education institutions
- Universities in Iceland
- Music schools

=== Science ===
- Scientific research institutions

=== Culture ===
- County archives
- Libraries
- Municipality associations
- Museums

== Ministry for the Environment and Natural Resources ==
=== Agencies ===
- Icelandic Meteorological Office (Veðurstofa Íslands)
- Environment Agency of Iceland (Umhverfisstofnun)
- Iceland Construction Authority (Mannvirkjastofnun)
- Iceland Forest Service (Skógrækt ríkisins)
- Iceland GeoSurvey (Íslenskar orkurannsóknir)
- Icelandic Institute of Natural History (Náttúrufræðistofnun Íslands)
- Icelandic National Planning Agency (Skipulagsstofnun)
- Icelandic Recycling Fund (Úrvinnslusjóður)
- Institute of Freshwater Fisheries (Veiðimálastofnun)
- Myvatn Research Station (Náttúrurannsóknastöðin við Mývatn)
- National Land Survey of Iceland (Landmælingar Íslands)
- State Soil Conservation Service (Landgræðsla ríkisins)
- Stefansson Arctic Institute (Stofnun Vilhjálms Stefánssonar)
- Vatnajökull National (Vatnajökulsþjóðgarður)

== Ministry for Foreign Affairs ==
=== Agencies ===
- Icelandic International Development Agency (Þróunarsamvinnustofnun Íslands)

== Ministry of Finance and Economic Affairs ==
=== Agencies ===
- Central Bank of Iceland (Seðlabanki Íslands)
- Directorate of Customs (Tollstjóri)
- Directorate of Internal Revenue (Ríkisskattstjóri)
- Government Construction Contracting Agency (Framkvæmdasýsla ríkisins)
- Government Real Estate Agency (Fasteignir ríkissjóðs)
- Icelandic State Financial Investments (Bankasýsla ríkisins)
- State Alcohol and Tobacco Company of Iceland (Áfengis- og tóbaksverslun ríkisins)
- State Financial Management (Fjársýsla ríkisins)
- State Trading Centre (Ríkiskaup)
- Statistics Iceland (Hagstofa Íslands)
- Taxation Reassessment Committee (Yfirskattanefnd)

== Ministry of Industries and Innovation ==
=== Agencies ===
- Central Bureau of Applied Research (Skrifstofa rannsóknastofnana atvinnuveganna)
- Directorate of Fisheries (Fiskistofa)
- Financial Supervisory Authority (Fjármálaeftirlit)
- Freshfish Price Directorate (Verðlagsstofa skiptaverðs)
- Icelandic Competition Authority (Samkeppniseftirlitið)
- Icelandic Food and Veterinary Authority (Matvælastofnun)
- Icelandic Patent Office (Einkaleyfastofan)
- Icelandic Regional Development Institute (Byggðastofnun)
- Icelandic Tourist Board (Ferðamálastofa)
- Innovation Center Iceland (Nýsköpunarmiðstöð Íslands)
- Marine Research Institute (Hafrannsóknastofnunin)
- National Energy Authority (Orkustofnun)
- NSA Ventures (Nýsköpunarsjóður atvinnulífsins)

=== Government-owned corporations ===
- Matis (Matís ohf.)

== Ministry of the Interior ==
=== Agencies ===
- Bishop's Office (Biskupsstofa)
- Courts in Iceland
- Icelandic Civil Aviation Administration (Flugmálastjórn Íslands)
- Police (Lögregla)
- State Directory of Prisons (Fangelsismálastofnun ríkisins)
- Sýslumenn
- Icelandic Road and Coastal Administration (Vegagerðin)

=== Government-owned corporations ===
- Isavia ohf.
- Neyðarlínan ohf.

== Ministry of Welfare ==
=== Agencies ===
- Government Agency for Child Protection (Barnaverndarstofa)
- Directorate of Health (Embætti landlæknis)
- Multicultural Centre (Fjölmenningarsetur)
- Icelandic Radiation Safety Authority (Geislavarnir ríkisins)
- State Diagnostic and Counselling Centre (Greiningar- og ráðgjafarstöð ríkisins)
- Health institutions
- Dalvík Health Centre (Heilsugæslustöðin Dalvík)
- Clinics
- National Hearing and Speech Institute of Iceland (Heyrnar- og talmeinastöð Íslands)
- Housing Financing Fund (Íbúðalánasjóður)
- Centre for Gender Equality (Jafnréttisstofa)
- National University Hospital of Iceland (Landspítali – háskólasjúkrahús)
- Medication Payment Committee (Lyfjagreiðslunefnd)
- Icelandic Medicines Agency (Lyfjastofnun)
- State Mediator (Ríkissáttasemjari)
- Akureyri Hospital (Sjúkrahúsið á Akureyri)
- Icelandic Health Insurance (Sjúkratryggingar Íslands)
- Social Insurance Administration (Tryggingastofnun ríkisins)
- Debtors' Ombudsman (Umboðsmaður skuldara)
- Administration of Occupational Safety and Health (Vinnueftirlit ríkisins)
- Directorate of Labour (Vinnumálastofnun)
- National Bioethics Committee (Vísindasiðanefnd)
- National Institute for the Blind, Visually Impaired and Deafblind (Þjónustu- og þekkingarmiðstöð fyrir blinda, sjónskerta og daufblinda einstaklinga)
- Nursing homes

== See also ==
- List of Icelandic ministries
- Government agencies in Norway
- Government agencies in Sweden
