= Vesturbær =

Coordinates: 64°08′55″N 21°57′10″W

- District
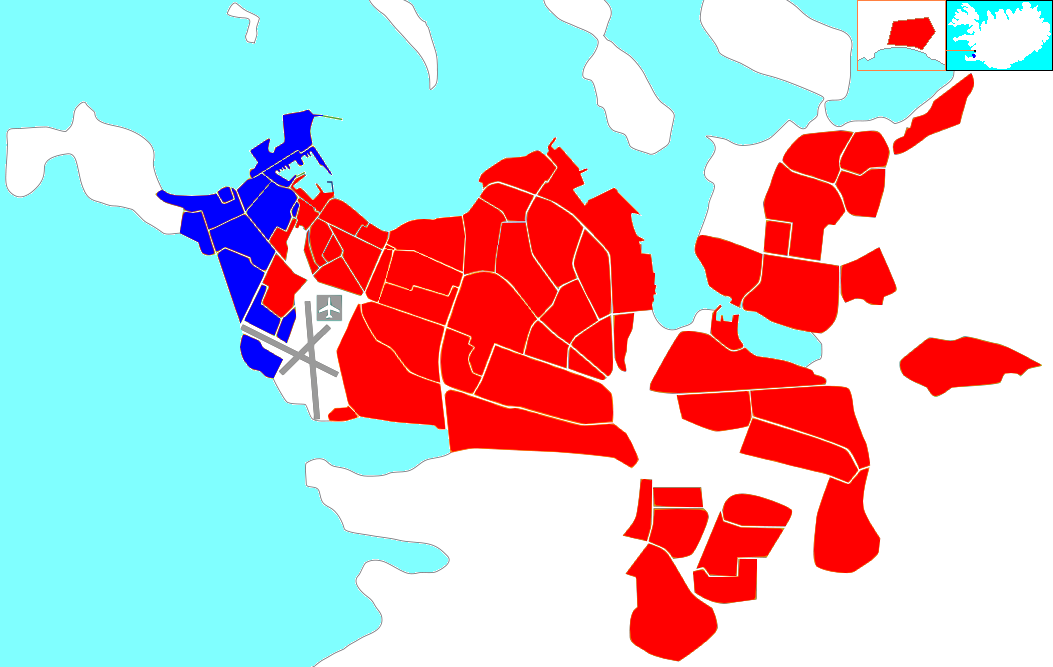
- Country: Iceland
- Municipality: Reykjavík

Area
  - Total: 2.9 km^{2} (1.1 sq mi)

Population (2018)
  - Total: 16,000
  - Density: 5,500/km^{2} (14,000/sq mi)
- Postal code: IS-107

Vesturbær (Icelandic pronunciation: [ˈvɛstʏrˌpaiːr̥]) is a district in Reykjavík in Iceland, comprising eight neighbourhoods west of the city center: Gamli Vesturbær [ˈkamlɪ ˈvɛstʏrˌpaiːr̥], Bráðræðisholt [ˈprauðˌraiːðɪsˌhɔl̥t], Grandahverfi [ˈkrantaˌkʰvɛrvɪ], Hagahverfi [ˈhaːɣaˌkʰvɛrvɪ], Melar [ˈmɛːlar̥], Skjól [ˈscouːl̥], Grímsstaðaholt [ˈkrimsˌstaːðaˌhɔl̥t], Skildinganes [ˈscɪltiŋkaˌnɛːs] and Litli Skerjafjörður [ˈlɪhtlɪ ˌscɛrjaˌfjœrðʏr̥].

== Overview ==
Vesturbæjarlaug in Vesturbær District Reykjavík

Vesturbær, or the West Town, was the first district to develop when Reykjavík started to grow from a small village to a town in the late 19th century. Vesturbær is mostly residential with increasing commercial activity at Grandi, the part of the harbor that belongs to Vesturbær. Vesturbær is one of the most expensive districts in Reykjavík real estate. The district is home to the University of Iceland, in addition to four grade schools: Melaskóli, Landakotsskóli, Vesturbæjarskóli and Grandaskóli and one junior high Hagaskóli. The district service center is in Vesturmiðstöð on Laugavegur. The athletics team KR is also based in Vesturbær, and its stadium is in the area. Vesturbæjarlaug is the local swimming pool and an important community hub.

== Main sights ==
- Vesturbæjarlaug – swimming pool
- Whales Of Iceland - Whale Museum
