= Foldaskóli =

School in Reykjavík, Iceland

Foldaskóli is a compulsory school in Reykjavík, Iceland, educating students in years 1 through 10. It was built to serve the then new suburban neighbourhood of Grafarvogur. The school opened in an unfinished building in 1985. The national curriculum in Innovation Education was developed at the school by two of its teachers.

Construction of the school building was completed in 1991. It consists of three separate units or houses. In 2001–03 the facilities were enlarged with additional classroom space, a new gymnasium and a new cafeteria kitchen. The school was designated a green flag school for environmental awareness and action in 2006 and 2008.

Enrollment grew rapidly at first, peaking at approximately 1,200 in 1990. It declined as the local population aged and as other schools were built nearby. In 2012 Foldaskóli became a consolidated school, including students from two areas previously served by their own schools; enrollment in the 2019–20 school year was approximately 500.

The head teacher is Kristrún Guðjónsdóttir. Previous head teachers were Arnfinnur Jónsson (1985–1992), Ragnar Gíslason (1992–2002), Kristinn Breiðfjörð Guðmundsson (2002–2016), Ágúst Ólason (2016–2017), Skúli Kristjánsson (2017–2018) and Bára Jóhannsdóttir (2018–2019).

The curriculum for Innovation Education (Icelandic: Nýsköpunarmennt), which is now required in all compulsory schools in Iceland in grades 4 through 7, was developed at Foldaskóli by two teachers, Gísli Þorsteinsson and Rósa Gunnarsdóttir, in 1998–2005. The school is the traditional host for an annual competition in the subject which began in the early 1990s.
