= International School of Iceland =

- Alþjóðaskólinn á Íslandi

Location
- Langalina 8 and Ægisgrund 7 Garðabær, 210; Iceland; 64°5′36.17″N 21°56′19.59″W

Information
- Former names: American Embassy School; Reykjavik International School
- Type: Private international school
- Established: 2004; 22 years ago
- Principal: Hanna Hilmarsdóttir
- Age range: 5-16
- Enrollment: 125
- Average class size: 25
- Language: English, Icelandic
- Hours in school day: 6-7
- Colours: Blue and green
- Website: www.internationalschool.is

The International School of Iceland (abbreviated ISI; official name in Icelandic: Alþjóðaskólinn á Íslandi) is a private, non-profit international school in Garðabær in the Reykjavík area of Iceland, first established in 1960 as the American Embassy School. ISI has received support in the form of grants, training and consultation from the Office of Overseas Schools in Washington, D.C. since the 1960s.

== History ==
Previously, the school was known as the American Embassy School and then Reykjavik International School in 2004 before taking on its present name in 2006. The school was located on Bergstaðastræti in Reykjavík (as the American Embassy School) and in Grafarvogur before finding its current home in Garðabær, a municipality of the Greater Reykjavík area.

The International School of Iceland offers a course of study for students K-10. This means that ISI can serve students of primary, middle or high school age. After serving grades K-7 for many years, the school was expanded to include grade 8 in the 2015-2016 school year. Grade 9 was added during the 2016-2017 school year and most recently grade 10 was added to the curriculum in the 2017-2018 school year. This allows students to attend ISI for their entire grunnskoli career before moving directly to menntaskóli (secondary) education.

The school, constructed in 2005, is housed within the Sjálandsskóli building at Langalina 8, 210 Garðabær. Grades K-3 are housed in a second building next door, called Thorsmork.

In August 2023, the school moved grades 5-10 into a new building at Ægisgrund 7. As of 2026, all classes of grades 5-10 are taught in this building, except for gym, swimming and lunch time where the students continue to use the swimming pool, gym and lunchroom facility in the Sjálandsskóli building.

== Academics ==
The International School of Iceland offers two programs, or “streams.” The English stream is for families whose parents have been temporarily assigned to work in Iceland by an embassy, business or university; typically, these families live in Iceland for 3 years or fewer. The Bilingual stream is intended for students who live in Iceland on a permanent basis or for an undetermined length of time.

The program includes English, Icelandic (Bilingual program only), mathematics, humanities, thematic units from the International Primary Curriculum, gym, swimming, art, textiles, theater and woodwork. Students in the English stream will learn Spanish and Mandarin Chinese as of 2014.

As of 2026, students in grades K-6 continue this education but are no longer provided with woodwork, textiles or Mandarin Chinese.

Students in grades 7-10 are in the MYP program. This program includes English, mathematics, Icelandic or Spanish as a language B option (with students taking Icelandic divided into six phases), Danish or Creative Expressions as a language C option (with students taking Danish divided into three phases, Creative Expressions only for grades 9-10), humanities, science, gym and health, art, design (only for grades 7-8).

ISI also requires students in grades 7-9 to take part in Passion Projects, where they are instructed to research and present a field of their own passion. This project is carried out for a month, with students taking time from their English or other classes to work on them. The presentations are in the beginning of June and family members of students are welcome to visit the school to view them.

In 2026, students in grade 9 did not do Passion Projects, but instead worked on Community Projects. During these projects, the students of grade 9 each got a penpal from a school in Zambia. Then the students were required to create different fundraising events to fundraise for different supplies such as watercolours, paintbrushes, pencils and more for both ISI and their penpals' schools.

As part of the IB MYP program, students in grade 10 are required to complete a Personal Project. This project, similar to Passion Projects, requires a student to research a field of their own passion. They must form a research goal and product goal, and record their findings in a process journal. The Personal Project also requires each student to write a max. 15 page reflective report on their experience with working on their Personal Project. Students must also complete an academic honesty report, detailing their meetings with supervisors to ensure their projects and the shown progress or proof provided in the report are not plagiarised. The Projects are presented, with each presentation taking about 15 minutes, in early April. Parents of the students are welcome to view the presentations at the school.

In addition to the academic program, ISI uses external assessments to measure student learning. MAP (Measures of Academic Progress) assessments were introduced at ISI in the fall of 2010. Students in the Bilingual program and MYP program in Icelandic level 5 or above take the Icelandic National Exams (Samræmd próf) in mathematics and Icelandic in grades 4, 7 and 9. These exams are administered each year in September.

In May 2023, ISI was the second school after Menntaskólinn við Hamrahlíð to offer any form of International Baccalaureate education in Iceland with the introduction of the IB Middle Years Program for grades 7-10. ISI is the first and only school in Iceland to have the IB MYP program and is the first private school in Iceland to have any form of IB education.

== Accreditation ==
In 2010, the school was audited by the Icelandic Ministry of Education. ISI is undergoing the accreditation process with the Council of International Schools (CIS). After a visit from CIS representative George Hobson in January 2015, ISI was given official membership status. In addition, ISI is a full member of ECIS (European Council of International Schools).

In 2017, ISI received joint accreditation with both CIS and MSA (Middle States Association of Colleges and Schools) organizations.

== Culture and traditions ==
School traditions include an annual berry picking trip, a tree planting field trip and a winter ski trip to Bláfjöll (weather permitting). In May, students run to raise money for UNICEF. During November til late December or January, ISI also takes part annually in writing letters for Amnesty International. In 2025, ISI marked 10 years of writing for Amnesty International.

Each year also brings a Halloween Party, holiday celebrations throughout the month of December, a pot-luck dinner in February and a Spring Event with themes that vary from year to year (e.g. 80s Night, Color Explosion or Masquerade).

In May 2014, the school hosted a celebration of its 10-year anniversary; guests included the Minister of Education, the mayor of Garðabær, representatives from local embassies, and former and current students.

In May 2024, the school celebrated its 20th anniversary by having every student create an artwork within a circle, which were then used to create a large artwork that decorates the main hall of the new school building.

Previously, in the spring of each year, students in grades 5-6 raised money to go on an overnight trip in the Icelandic countryside. Grade 7 attended Reykir School Camp for a week of learning and fun. Grades 8-10 went abroad to expand their learning.

Currently, in the spring of each year students in grades 5-6 continue to go on an overnight trip, and grades 7-8 on a two night trip in the Icelandic countryside. Grades 9-10 go biannually abroad for three to four nights, and biannually to the Icelandic countryside for three nights.

Students in grade 10 go on an annual mystery trip filled with many fun activities. These activities have included going to the Adrenaline Nature Park, the arcade, LaserTag, climbing, and Skemmtigarðurinn in Gufunes.

== Activities ==
In addition to the Academic program, the school offers students classes in swimming, gym, textiles, art and woodwork as part of a typical school day.

The school also offers after-school activities, previously including Photography Club, Art Club, computer coding, role-playing games and creativity, Spanish Language, Icelandic Enrichment, Football (Soccer) Club, Chess Club, Science Club, DJ Workshop, Explorers Club and Comic Club.

Currently, the school offers after-school activities for grades 1-6, including homework club and Mandarin Chinese Language.
