= Government Construction Contracting Agency =

Government Construction Contracting Agency (FSR)
Agency overview
- Formed: 2001
- Jurisdiction: Government of Iceland
- Headquarters: Reykjavík, Iceland
- Employees: 76 (2024)
- Agency executive: Director
- Parent department: Ministry of Finance and Economic Affairs
- Website: www.frs.is/en

Government Construction Contracting Agency (FSR) (Icelandic: Framkvæmdasýsla ríkisins) is an independent government agency responsible for managing public works in Iceland on behalf of the government. The institution is intended to improve efficiency, cost-effectiveness, and quality in the execution of government projects. FSR is funded by financial allocations from the state and falls under the jurisdiction of the Ministry of Finance. Established in 2001, the agency is headquartered in Reykjavík.

== Responsibilities ==
The responsibilities of FSR are defined in Act No. 84/2001 on the organization of public administration. The institution is intended to be a leading force in the field of public administration to improve efficiency, cost-effectiveness, and quality in government projects.

'Public execution' refers to the construction, maintenance, or alterations of infrastructure funded by the state to any extent, with an estimated cost to the state of at least 5 million ISK.

FSR is tasked with ensuring cost-effectiveness in the organization of public execution. To fulfill this role, the institution is required to:

- provide advice and coordinate the preparation and planning of public works;
- prepare and execute tenders and contracts with contractors;
- handle accounting and payments for works;
- take the lead in issuing guidelines for the size and quality of public infrastructure;
- build and maintain a registry of state properties beneficial to ministries and government agencies in property management;
- promote the development of the contractor market and increased competition;
- contribute to efficiency and professional practices in connection with practical implementations.

Public execution bidding is governed by the Public Procurement Act.

== Structure ==
FSR operates under the auspices of the Ministry of Finance and Economic Affairs, which is responsible for public works in Iceland. The institution does not have a separate board, and its director reports directly to the Minister of Finance and Economic Affairs.

The ministry responsible for the financial oversight of public works conducts initial assessments and planning. FSR then oversees the practical execution, and evaluation, and ultimately conducts performance assessments. With performance evaluations, an assessment is made of how the execution has progressed compared to plans and similar implementations.

== Divisions ==
The institution is divided into four main divisions:

- The "Planning and Coordination Division" manages the maintenance and control of FSR projects in the fields of planning and coordination.
- The "Execution and Evaluation Division" manages the maintenance and control of FSR projects in the fields of execution and evaluation.
- The "Operations Division" handles operation-related matters of FSR, accounting, finance, financial reporting, settlements, etc.
- "Support Services" is a support unit for the operations of individual divisions and reports directly to the director.

The institution operates on Part A of the budget and functions as a public institution in accordance with the Public Finance Act.

In 2024, 76 employees were registered on the FSR website.

== See also ==
- Building Cost Information Service
