= Vesturbæjarlaug =

Swimming pool in Iceland

Coordinates: 64.1444°N 21.9630°W

- Vesturbæjarlaug, pool area.
- Interactive map of Vesturbæjarlaug
- Location: Hofsvallagata, Vesturbær, Reykjavík, 107
- Owner: Reykjavíkurborg
- Dimensions: Length: 25 m (main pool); Width: 12.5 m (main pool); Depth: 0.9 to 3.9 m

Construction
- Opened: 1961
- Architect: Bárður Ísleifsson

Website
- Official site

Vesturbæjarlaug, also known as Sundlaug Vesturbæjar, is a swimming pool in the Vesturbær district in Reykjavík, the capital of Iceland. It has a 12.5×25 m geothermally heated outdoor swimming pool with depth ranging from 0.9 to 3.9 m. There is also an adjacent playpool, several hot tubs, a cold tub, outdoor showers, a steam room and saunas. The pool was opened on November 25 1961. It had two "firsts" for Icelandic swimming pools: the large playpool for children, and the spiral-shaped hot tubs, with dimensions based on the pool of Snorri Sturluson in Reykholt. These design elements were reused on a larger scale by architect Einar Sveinsson for the much larger Laugardalslaug, which opened in 1968, and the design of the hot tubs was widely copied by other Icelandic swimming pools over the next years.

The pool house was designed by architect Bárður Ísleifsson, but the hot tub and outdoor area was designed by Gísli Halldórsson. The pool reception area was initially decorated with wall paintings by British-Icelandic artist Barbara Árnason, who drew inspiration from the saga Harðar saga ok Hólmverja, where Helga Haraldsdóttir saved her two sons by swimming across Hvalfjörður. Most of these decorations were removed in 1995, but a small part remains on the ceiling. Vesturbæjarlaug was the first swimming pool in Iceland that was designed for leisure, and not just swimming. Since it opened it has been a popular hub for the neighborhood where people meet and chat.
