= Education in Iceland =

Ministry of Education, Science and Culture
- Minister of Education, Science and Culture: Inga Sæland

National education budget (2023)
- Budget: ISK 46.3 billion

General details
- Primary languages: Icelandic
- System type: National
- Current system: 2007

Literacy (2024)
- Total: 99%
- Male: 99%
- Female: 99%

Enrollment
- Total: Not available
- Primary: 100% (graduating)
- Secondary: 97%
- Post secondary: Not available

Attainment
- Secondary diploma: 57%
- Post-secondary diploma: Not available
- Secondary and tertiary education divided into academic and vocational systems.

The system of education in Iceland is divided in four levels: playschool, compulsory, upper secondary and higher, and is similar to that of other Nordic countries. Education is mandatory for children aged 6–16. Most institutions are funded by the state; there are very few private schools in the country. Iceland is a country with gymnasia.

== Background ==
The first national education law was the 1907 education law, and the first national curriculum was published in 1926. Although the curriculum was periodically revised, the overall education system was not significantly modernized until the Compulsory Education Act of 1974, which mandated special education services for all students with disabilities.

According to the Ministry of Education, Science and Culture:

A fundamental principle of the Icelandic educational system is that everyone should have equal opportunities to acquire an education, irrespective of sex, economic status, residential location, religion, possible handicap, and cultural or social background.

The Ministry of Education, Science and Culture has the jurisdiction of educational responsibility. Traditionally, education in Iceland has been run in the public sector; there is a small, although growing, number of private education institutions in the country. Over the years, the educational system has been decentralised, and responsibility for primary and lower secondary schools lies with the local authorities. The state runs upper secondary schools and higher education institutions.

The Ministry issues the National Curriculum Guidelines. The National Centre for Educational Materials publishes educational materials for education institutions, and issues them free of charge. The Educational Testing Institute is the country's sole examination board; responsible for issuing and grading national assessments.

There are 192 institutions catering for compulsory education, 42 schools for upper secondary education and 9 higher education institutions.

== History ==
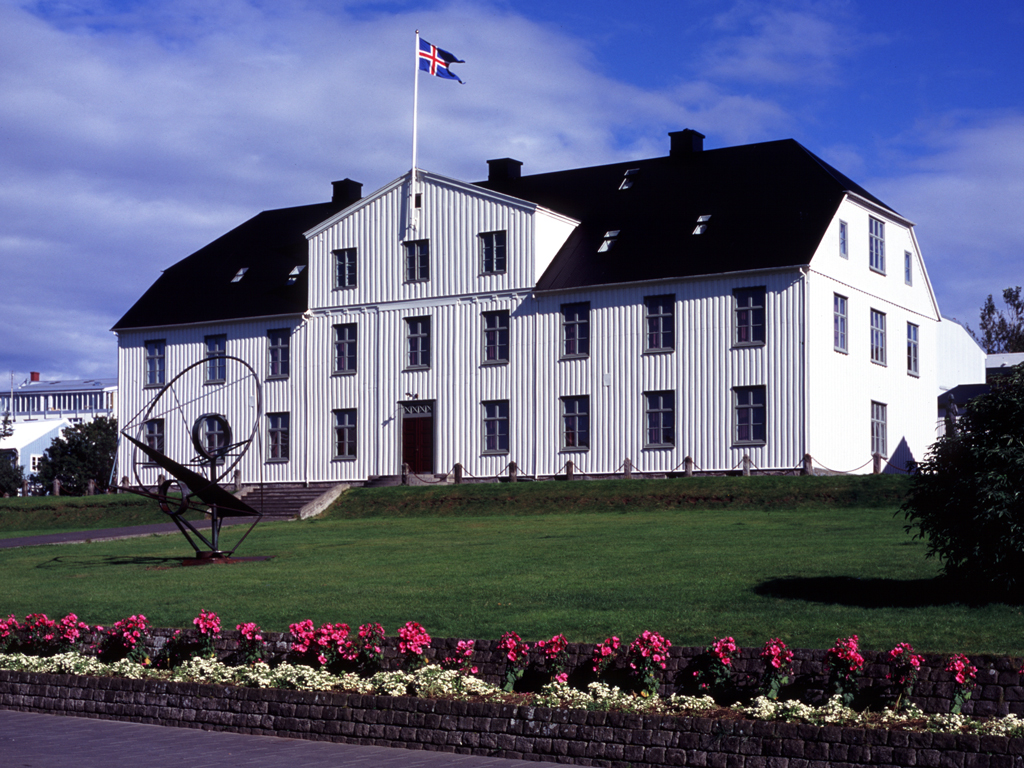
The main building of Menntaskólinn í Reykjavík

The oldest gymnasiums in the country are Menntaskólinn í Reykjavík and Menntaskólinn á Akureyri. Menntaskólinn í Reykjavík traces its origin to 1056, when a school was established in Skálholt. The school was moved to Reykjavík in 1786, but poor housing conditions forced it to move again in 1805 to Bessastaðir near Reykjavík. In 1846 the school was moved to its current location, and a new building was erected for it in Reykjavík.

The University of Iceland was the first higher education institution in the country, and was established on 17 June 1911, uniting three former Icelandic schools: Prestaskólinn, Læknaskólinn and Lagaskólinn, which taught theology, medicine and law, respectively. The university originally had only faculties for these three fields, in addition to a faculty of humanities. The first rector of the university was Björn M. Ólsen, a professor in the faculty of humanities.

== Levels ==
The levels in diagrammatic form

The Icelandic education system comprises four levels: playschool, compulsory, upper secondary and higher level.

=== Playschool ===
Playschool or leikskóli, is non-compulsory education for those under the age of six, and is the first step in the education system. The current legislation concerning playschools was passed in 2007. The Ministry of Education, Science and Culture is responsible for the policies and methods that playschools must use, and they issue the National Curriculum Guidelines. They are also responsible for ensuring that the curriculum is suitable so as to make the transition into compulsory education as easy as possible. However, the Ministry does not implement the regulations and guidelines; instead this is the responsibility of the local authority, who fund and administer playschools. In addition, the local authority employs representatives who supervise the playschools’ operation.

Parents must pay for their children to attend playschools. Around 30% of the costs of running the institutions are covered by these fees. Private playschools’ fees can be around 10–20% higher than those of public institutions. Almost all private schools receive some municipal funding.

The buildings are often purpose-built on a site where around 30-40m^{2} of playing space is available for each child in the playground. Around 6 m^{2} per child is allocated indoors. The institutions are intended to be mixed sex. Playschools are intended for children under the age of six; the youngest children to attend are at least two years old. Children of single parents and students are given priority, and in some cases children with a disability are also given priority. In the majority of cases, the children are divided into age groups, but in some smaller communities these may be grouped together.

Children attend playschool for a minimum of four and a maximum of nine hours per day.

=== Compulsory ===
A pie chart showing how an Icelandic child's compulsory education time will be divided over a ten-year period

Compulsory education or grunnskóli (lit. “basic school”), is the period of education which is compulsory for all. The legislation concerning compulsory education was passed in 2008, and in 1996 municipalities took over the running of compulsory education. It comprises primary and lower secondary education, which often takes place at the same institution. The law states that education is mandatory for children and adolescents between the ages of 6 and 16. The school year lasts nine months, and begins between August 21 and September 1, ending between May 31 and June 10. The minimum number of school days is 170, but after a new teachers’ wage contract, this will increase to 180. Lessons take place five days a week.

Responsibility lies with parents for making sure that their children attend and register at school. The law states that it is the responsibility of the municipality to give instruction and fund institutions (this includes teaching, substitute teaching, administration and specialist services), and provide special education if required. There are no entry requirements for pupils, and the acceptance rate is 100% at six years of age.

Pupils have the right to attend a school in the area in which they live. The state requires that the school integrates disabled pupils into mainstream education.

The state is responsible for assessing institutions to make sure that they are operating within the law and the National Curriculum Guidelines. They also produce educational materials, and implement educational law and regulations.

Compulsory education is divided into ten years. Schools which have all ten years, year one to seven, and years eight to ten are common. Those schools which teach from years eight to ten often have a wider catchment area. The size of institutions is widely varied. In the Reykjavík urban area, schools can be up to 1200 pupils in size. In rural areas, schools can have fewer than 10 pupils, and around 50% of schools have fewer than 100 pupils. All compulsory education institutions are mixed sex. Many counselling services are available, including help with studies and specific subjects; psychological counselling is also available.

Each school must follow the National Curriculum Guidelines, but exceptions are made for schools with special characteristics. The school is required to create a school working plan and an annual calendar, organise teaching and pupil assessment and to provide extracurricular activities. The number of lessons for each year is as follows:

| Years | Age range | Lessons per week |
|---|---|---|
| 1–4 | 6–10 years | 30 |
| 5–7 | 10–13 years | 35 |
| 8–10 | 13–16 years | 37 |

Nowadays, the National Curriculum Guidelines have provisions for those learning Icelandic whose first language is not Icelandic and deaf and hearing-impaired pupils. Pupils are expected to keep up with the pace of teaching; however those students who are struggling receive remedial teaching without being moved from most of their classes. An emphasis is made on providing a variety of teaching methods.

==== Assessment ====
In Iceland assessment and evaluation of pupils is conducted internally, and is not standardised between different institutions. Pupils are given regular reports to grade their progress; however the way in which this is done varies between schools. For example, a numerical grade could be given, or an oral and written assessment may be given.

Their principal purpose is to help ease the transition into upper secondary education and help the pupil to choose a course of study. Pupils are awarded a certificate with their marks at the end of the compulsory schooling period.

In addition to pupil assessment, the law requires that schools implement some form of self-evaluation on the quality of their services and to make sure that institutions are operating inside the law and within guidelines. Schools are assessed externally every five years by the Ministry of Education, Science and Culture.

==== Teachers ====
Similar to primary education in other countries, from years one to seven, the same teacher teaches the pupils all of their subjects. From year eight upwards, pupils receive teaching from a number of different teachers (this marks the boundary between primary education and lower secondary education). Groups may be mixed around year by year.

Primary school teachers are general teachers who have received their training at either the University of Iceland or the University of Akureyri. The typical course lasts three years. Lower secondary teachers may also be trained at the University of Iceland. A BA or BS degree is required in this situation. The courses are designed to be both academic and practical. Municipalities are responsible for the employment of teachers. Optional in-service teacher training courses are offered on an annual basis.

=== Upper secondary ===
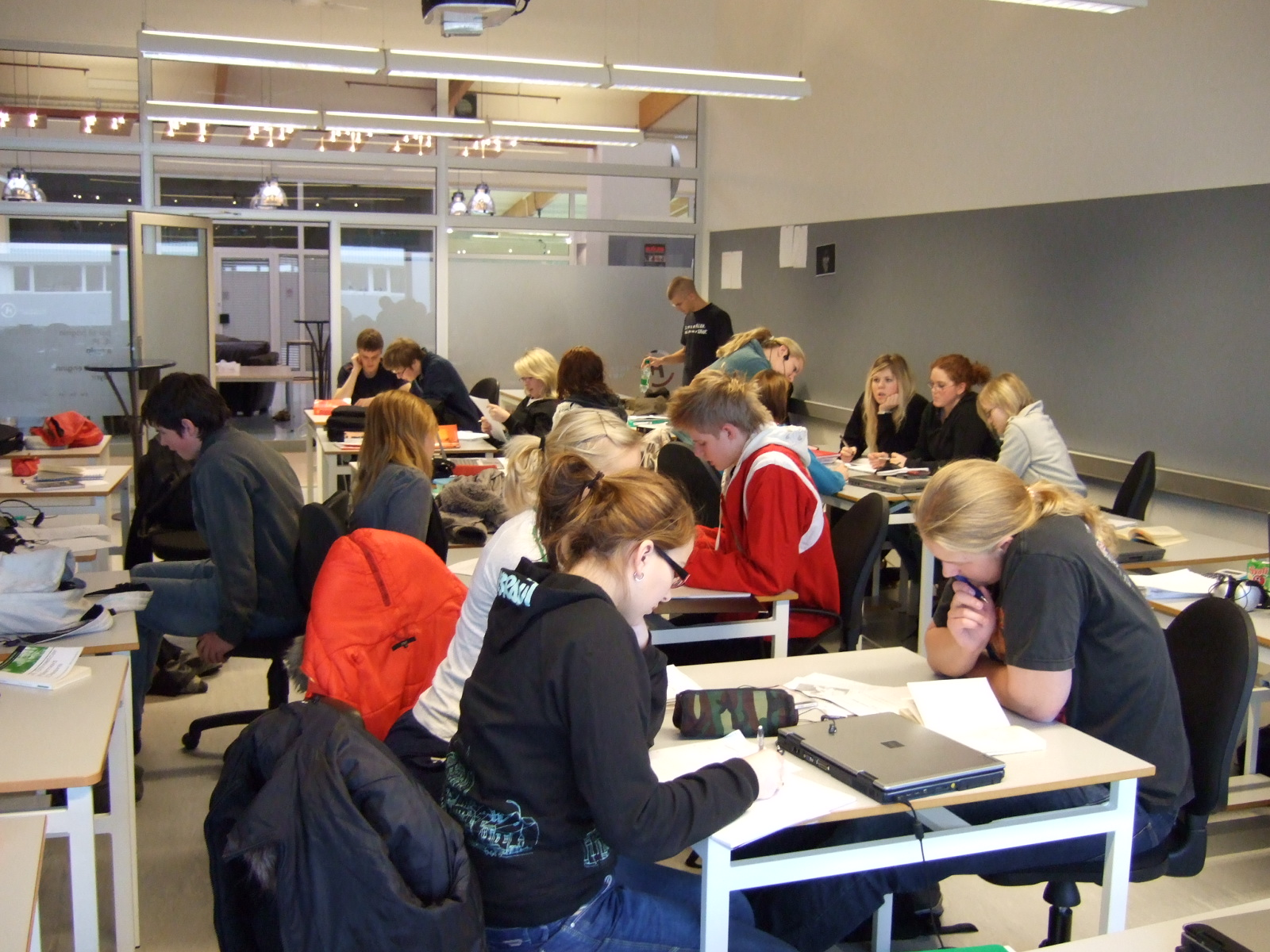
A classroom in the Hraðbraut gymnasium

Upper secondary education or framhaldsskóli (lit. “continued school”), follows lower secondary education. These schools are also known as gymnasia in English. It is not compulsory, but everyone who has had their compulsory education has the right to upper secondary education. The typical course length is three years, for students aged between 16 and 19. The length of the course can vary, especially in vocational courses. This stage of education is governed by the Upper Secondary School Act of 2007. Like all other schools in Iceland, upper secondary schools are mixed sex.

Students do not have to pay tuition fees, but they must pay an enrollment fee and are expected to buy their own textbooks. Students who enroll in vocational courses pay a portion of the costs of the materials that they use.

All students have the right to enter upper secondary education when they turn sixteen. Around 97% of students leaving lower secondary education enter into upper secondary education; however there is a notable drop-out rate. There are specific entry requirements for different courses, but as all students have the right to this sort of education, a general program of study is available for those students who may fail to meet requirements. Some schools enjoy more prestige and popularity than others, especially in Reykjavík, and those may need to turn away hundreds of students every year.

The school year lasts for nine months, and is divided into two terms: autumn and spring. Students attend around 32–40 lessons a week, each lasting 40–80 minutes. This can vary drastically between institutions.

There are around forty gymnasia in the country; sizes vary as much as the primary schools. The largest gymnasia have over 3,000 students—the smallest, less than fifty. The gymnasia can be divided thus:

- grammar schools—offering three-year-long programmes of study, ending with matriculation exams;
- industrial-vocational schools—theoretical and practical courses in various trades;
- comprehensive schools—offering a mixture of courses, has qualities of both a grammar school and an industrial-vocational institution, in addition to specialised vocational programmes;
- specialised vocational schools—programmes of study for specific trades and careers.

The law requires that there are academic, vocational, artistic and general programmes of study, all of which lead to higher education. Any gymnasium can therefore offer the matriculation examination, called the Stúdentspróf, providing it complies with Ministry of Education regulations.

The gymnasia have forms which operate on a unit-credit system, that is to say a term is divided into course units, each of which is worth a certain number of credits. Students are consequently able to regulate the speed of their education based on their personal circumstances. This system is used in most upper secondary institutions in Iceland.

Many institutions also offer evening classes targeted at adults, some of which are on par with their daytime courses. Distance learning is also offered at most schools.

Counselling services are also offered, like those of the compulsory education institutions.

==== Assessment ====
Examinations are taken at the end of every term as opposed to at the end of the year. Final years are often based on continuous assessments and assignments; however some courses do have final exams. There were no nationally co-ordinated exams in upper secondary education until school year 2003–4, when certain subjects were introduced. Institutions are also required to self-assess; like compulsory education institutions they are assessed externally every five years.

==== Teachers ====
Upper secondary teachers are required to have completed four years at university, of which at least two years must have been devoted to a major subject, and at least one to teaching methodology and skills. Vocational teachers must be qualified in their particular discipline, or must be a master craftsman in their trade, and have at least two years of experience.

In-service training courses are also offered. Teachers are paid by the state but hired by the individual school.

=== Higher education ===
The final level is higher education, or háskóli (lit. “high school”). There are eight such institutions in the country, most of which are run by the state. The first institution, the University of Iceland, opened in 1911, and is still the principal higher education institution in the country. In recent years, however, more universities have opened across the country, widening the range of choices available. Legislation concerning higher education institutions was passed in 1997, which includes a definition of the term háskóli (to include universities which do not carry out research). There is also separate legislation in place for each public institution, defining their role in research and general organisation. Private and public universities both receive funding from the state.

The administration of each university is divided into the Senate, the rector, faculty meetings, faculty councils and deans (however, some universities are not divided into faculties). The Senate ultimately makes decisions on the running and organisation of the institution and formulates policy. The state will formulate a contract with the university, defining the institution's objectives and the amount of funding that the state will give to the institution.

Despite the growing number of higher education institutions in the country, many students decide to pursue their university education abroad (around 16%, mostly in postgraduate studies).

The academic year lasts from September to May and is divided into two terms: autumn and spring.

==== Admission ====
Most undergraduates will have to pass some form of matriculation exam to get into university; however those with sufficient work experience may be admitted in some cases. Vocational and technical courses have looser requirements, only stating that the applicant have some sort of experience in their chosen field of study. Institutions are free to set their own admission criteria. Registration for potential students takes place from May to June each year; however the application deadline for foreign students is earlier: March 15.

==== Student finance ====
In state-run institutions, students only need pay registration fees; there are no tuition fees. Private institutions, however, charge fees. All students are eligible to some financial support from the Icelandic Student Loan Fund; the exact amount depends on their financial and personal situation. The student must begin to repay this money two years after completing their study programme. In addition to Icelandic students, students from the European Union or EEA-EFTA member states are also eligible to apply for loans, if they have been working in their trade in the country for at least one year.

Annually there are a limited number of scholarships available for foreign students to study the Icelandic language and literature at the University of Iceland, offered by the Ministry of Education, Science and Culture.

Grants are available for post-graduates in research universities, which are awarded on the basis of joint submission from student and professor, and approval from the respective faculty.

== Special education ==
Before the Compulsory Education Act of 1974, only selected groups of students with disabilities, such as deaf and blind students, received any formal special education, although students with mild disabilities had been accommodated at rural schools since 1907. With the changes in the law, a special school was opened in Reykjavik for students with intellectual disabilities, and similar programs followed. Students with physical disabilities were mainstreamed into regular classrooms. The Iceland University of Education developed programs to train teachers and other specialists to provide appropriate services.

Reflecting Icelandic cultural values of tolerance, equity, and celebrating differences rather than individualism, current government policy emphasizes inclusion, or "one school for all", although segregated classrooms and schools are still permitted and supported.

The Education Law on Upper Secondary Education of 1992 entitles students to attend schools and university, and to receive appropriate supports for doing so, but does not exempt them from the normal entrance requirements, such as demonstrating a given level of reading or mathematics achievement. Consequently, after reaching the end of compulsory school age, it is difficult for students with significant cognitive impairments to find further education.

== See also ==
- List of schools in Iceland
- List of universities in Iceland
- List of business schools in the Nordic countries
- Ministry of Education, Science and Culture
