= Menntaskólinn Hraðbraut =

Location
- Faxafen 10 (Iceland) Reykjavík; Iceland
- Coordinates: 64°07′44″N 21°52′01″W

Information
- Type: Private
- Motto: Tveimur árum á undan (Two Years Ahead)
- Established: August 1, 1996
- Status: Closed
- Principal: Ólafur Haukur Johnson
- Staff: 25
- Gender: Mixed
- Enrollment: 210
- Language: Icelandic
- Classrooms: 9
- Website: www.hradbraut.is

Menntaskólinn Hraðbraut (or Hraðbraut; meaning in Icelandic: speedway) was a privately run Icelandic secondary school that ran from 2003 to 2012. The school awarded a student degree after two years of study instead of the then standard four; the school's name reflected this express course.
