= Iceland School of Energy =

Coordinates: 64°07′25″N 21°55′37″W

- Islenski Orkuhaskólinn
- Former name: Reykjavik Energy Graduate School for Sustainable Systems (REYST)
- Established: 2007
- Director: Dr. Juliet Ann Newson
- Location: Menntavegur 1, Reykjavík, 102, Iceland
- Language: English
- Colours
- Website: https://en.ru.is/ise

The Iceland School of Energy (ISE; Icelandic: Íslenski Orkuháskólinn) is a graduate school within the Department of Engineering at Reykjavik University in Reykjavik, Iceland. It provides education in renewable energy through master's programmes, short courses, and professional education. ISE is jointly owned by Reykjavik Energy, Reykjavik University, and Iceland GeoSurvey.

== History ==
The Iceland School of Energy dates back to 2007, when Reykjavik Energy, Reykjavik University, and the University of Iceland signed an agreement to establish an international graduate program focused on sustainable energy systems. The school was named the Reykjavik Energy Graduate School for Sustainablformally opened in December of 2007, in December of 2007 and located at Reykjavik Energy's headquarters.

REYST was established as an interdisciplinary graduate program combining engineering, earth sciences, and business perspectives related to sustainable energy. Its first MSc students began their studies in 2008.

The program was restructured as the Iceland School of Energy in 2013 to include a new partner, the Icelandic GeoSurvey (ÍSOR). By this time, ISE was operating within Reykjavik University's department of engineering and offering masters programs in energy engineering and energy science. In 2018, ISE included a new study line in electric power systems.

== Programmes ==
The Iceland School of Energy offers three Masters of Science programmes:

- Sustainable Energy Science (MSc)
- Sustainable Energy Engineering (MSc)
- Electric Power Engineering (MSc)

Each program comprises 120 ECTS and is completed over two years. The programs are taught in English and included a master's thesis.

=== Sustainable Energy Science ===
The MSc in Sustainable Energy Science is an interdisciplinary program addressing the scientific, environmental, economic and societal aspects of energy systems. Admission is opne to applicants from relevant scientific, environmental issues, economics, and energy management.

Coursework and research may include geothermal engineering, energy technologies, energy systems, resource assessment, and related engineering subjects.

Sustainable Energy Engineering

The MSc in Sustainable Energy Engineering is intended primarily for students with previous education in engineering or a closely related technical field. The program covers the analysis, modeling, design, and operation of energy technologies and systems.

Coursework and research may include geothermal engineering, energy technologies, energy systems, resoruce assessment, and related engineering subjects. After successful completion of the programme the student is awarded the degree Master of Science in Sustainable Energy Engineering, and is eligible to apply for the title of Chartered Engineer in Iceland.

=== Electric Power Engineering ===
The MSc in Electric Power Engineering is intended primarily for students with backgrounds in electrical engineering, electronics, power engineering, or a closely related engineering disciplines.

The program covers subjects including electrical power systems, grid operation, high-voltage engineering, control and stability, and integration of renewable electricity generation. After successful completion of the programme the student is awarded the degree Master of Science in Sustainable Energy Engineering, and is eligible to apply for the title of Chartered Engineer in Iceland.

== Teaching and Research ==
Teaching at ISE is provided by Reykjavik University faculty as well as reserachers, visitng academics, and professionals from external organisations. The school's academic activities include coursework, research projects, field-based teaching, and master's research.

== Gallery ==
Reykjavík University Campus August 2020

Reykjavík University Campus February 2021

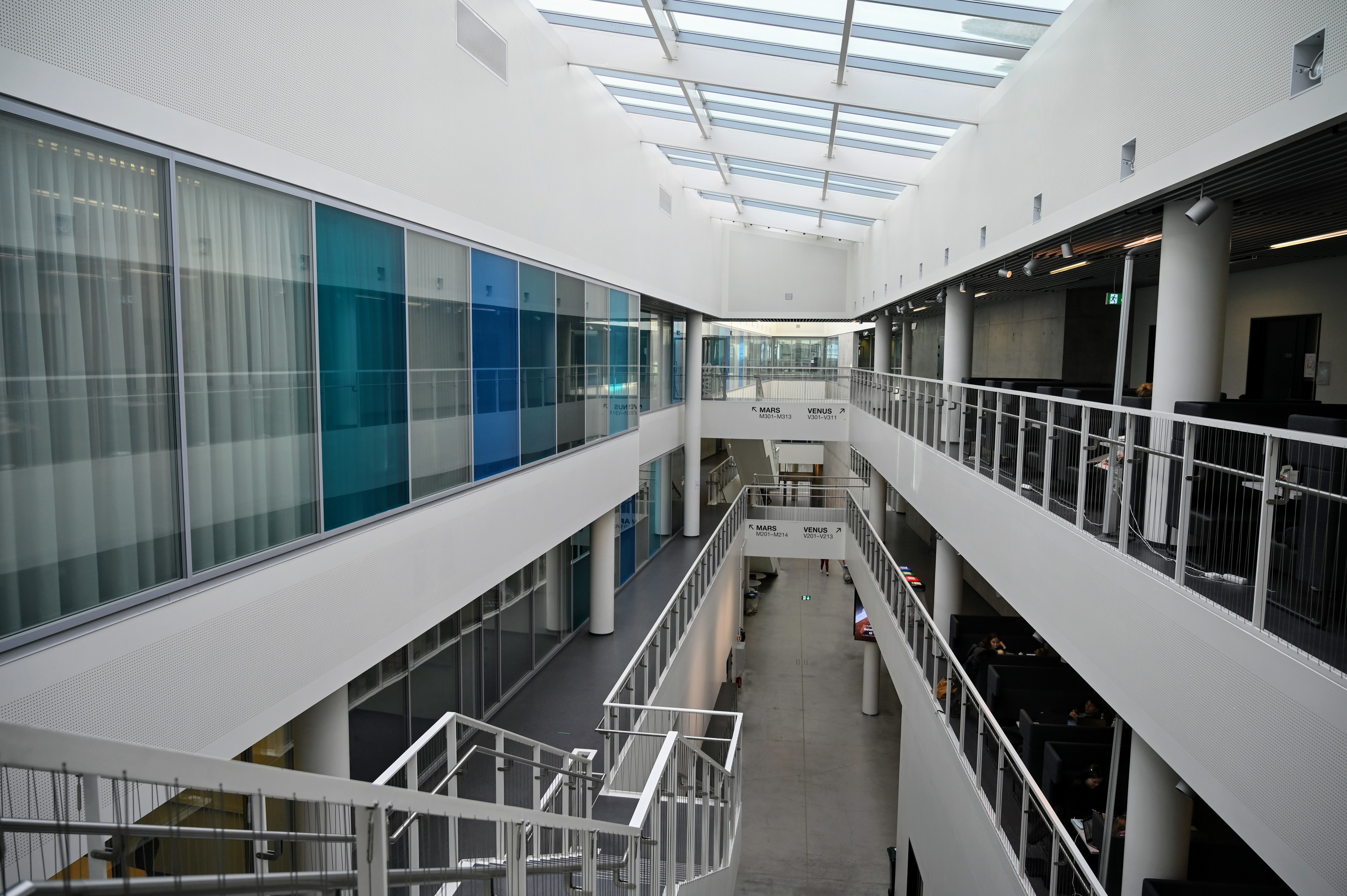
Reykjavík University Inside Hallway 3rd Floor

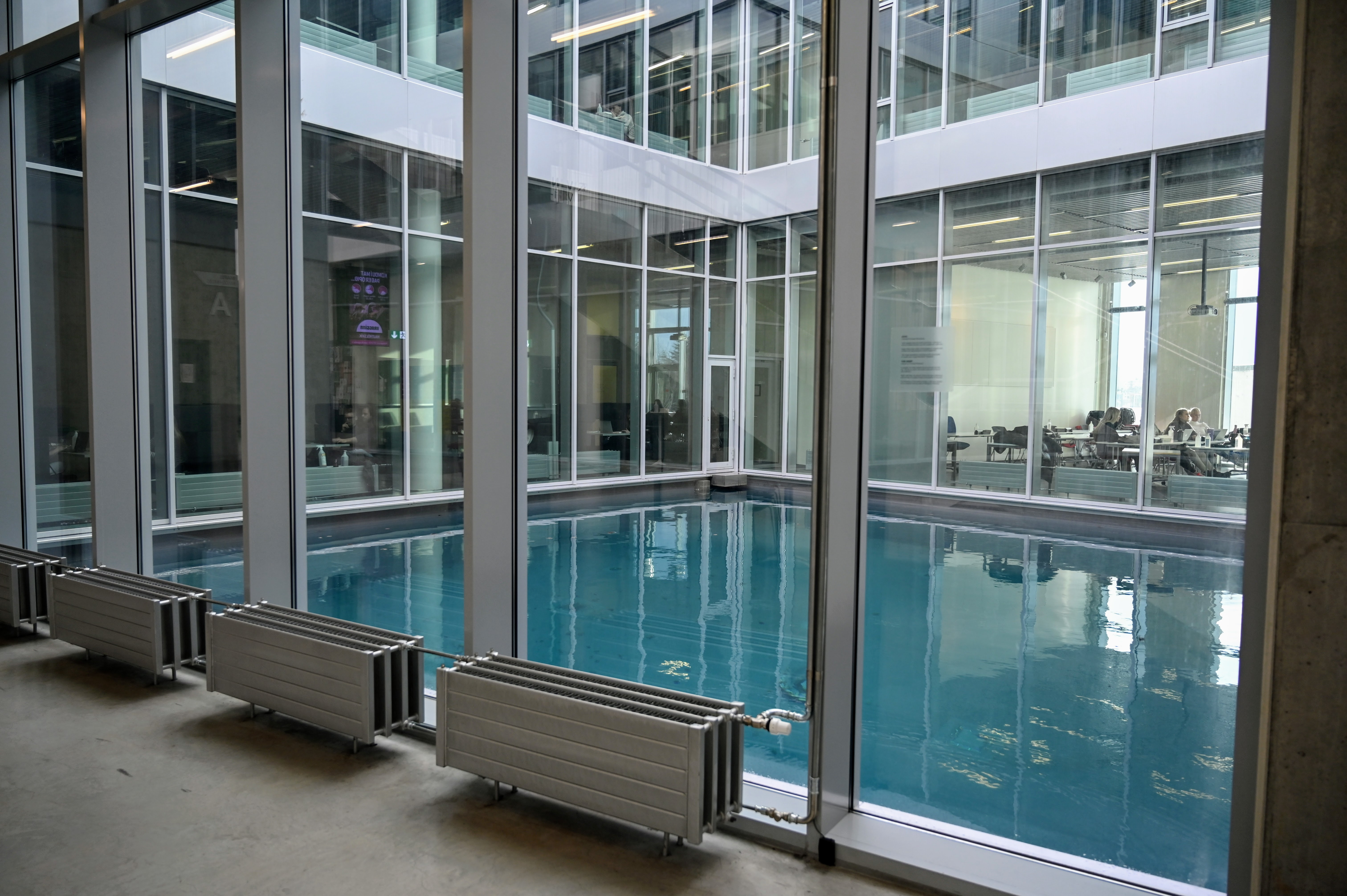
Reykjavík University Interior Ground Floor Calming Pool

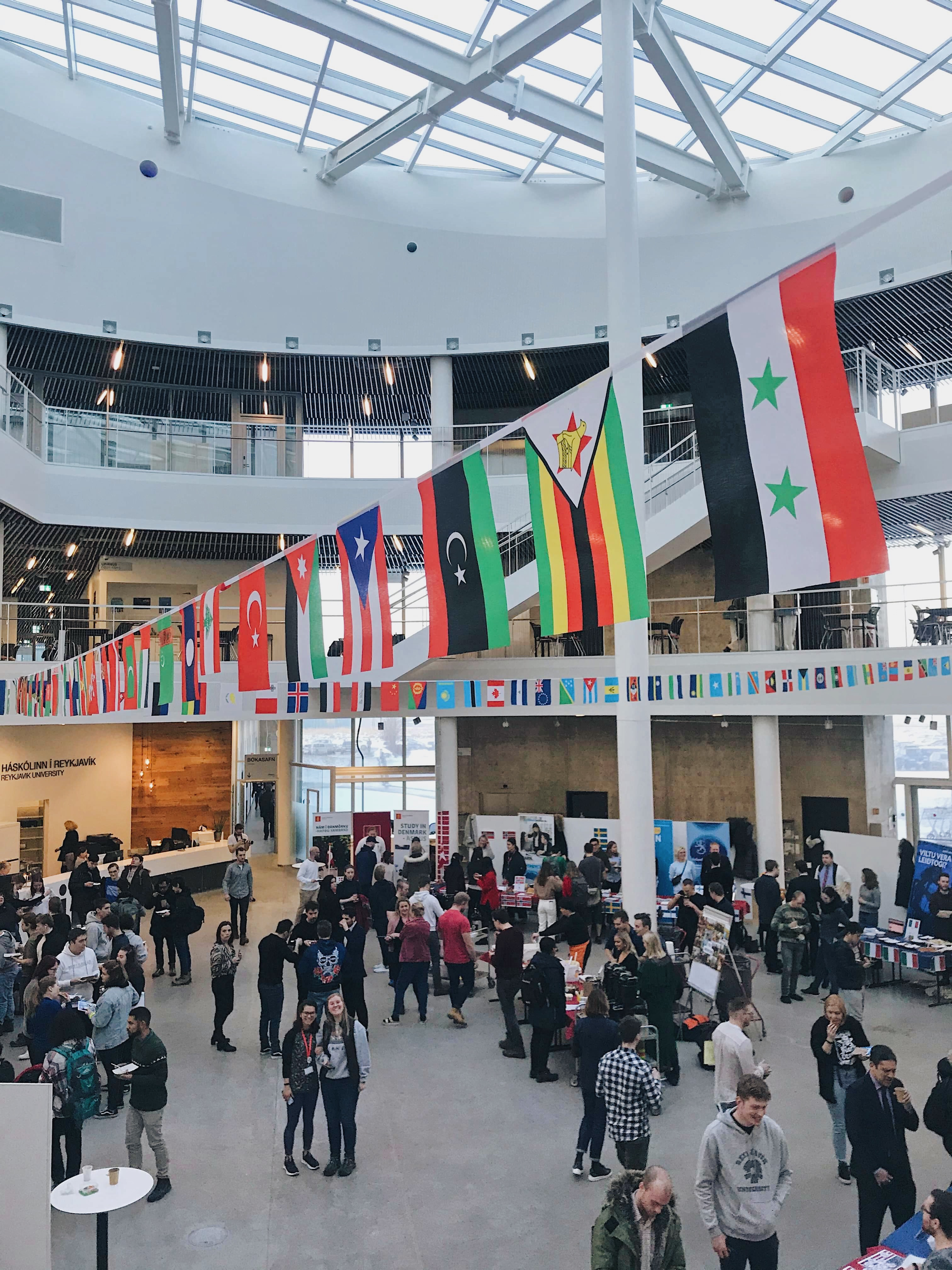
Reykjavík University International Day Spring 2020

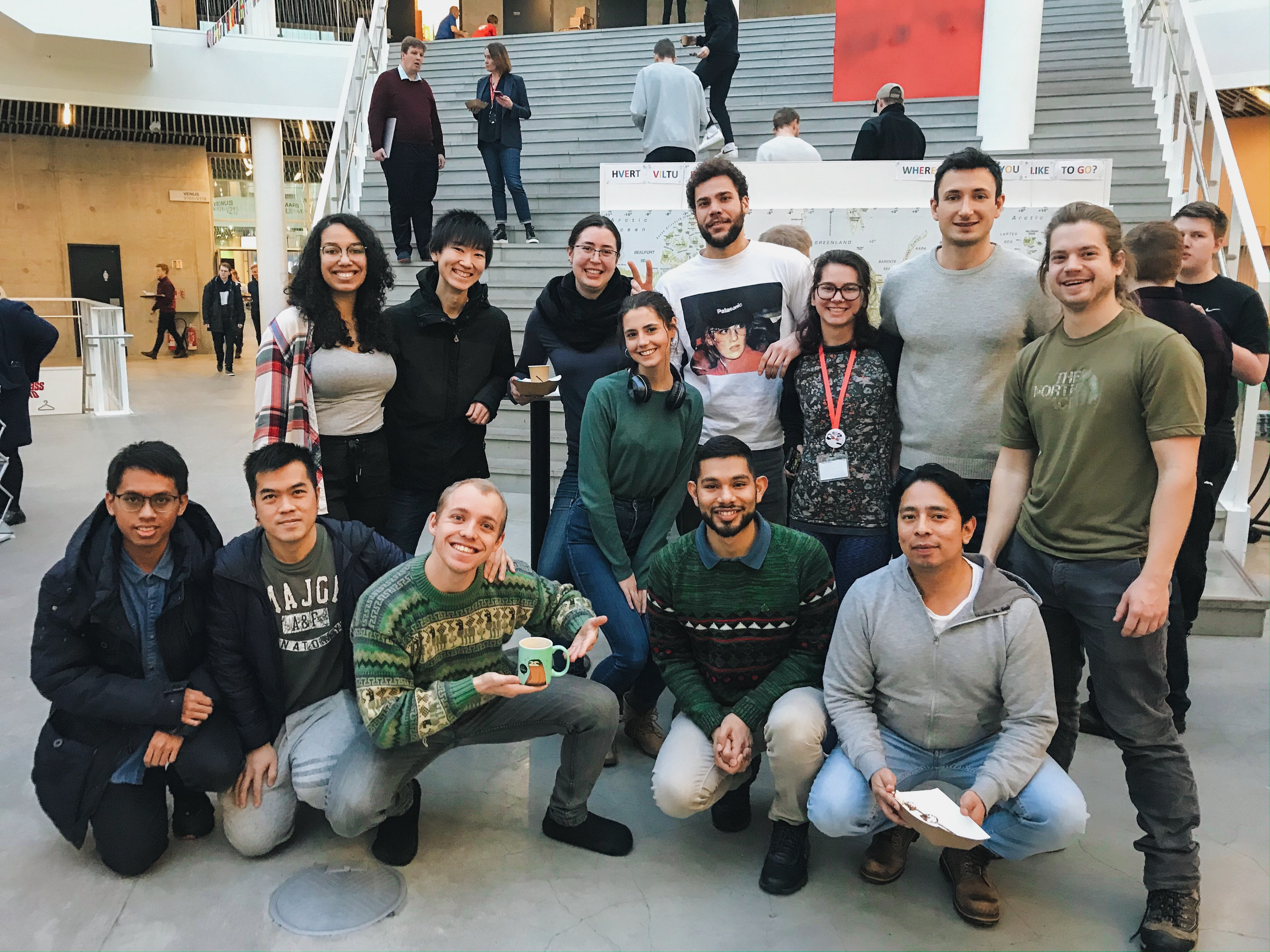
ISE Students at International Day

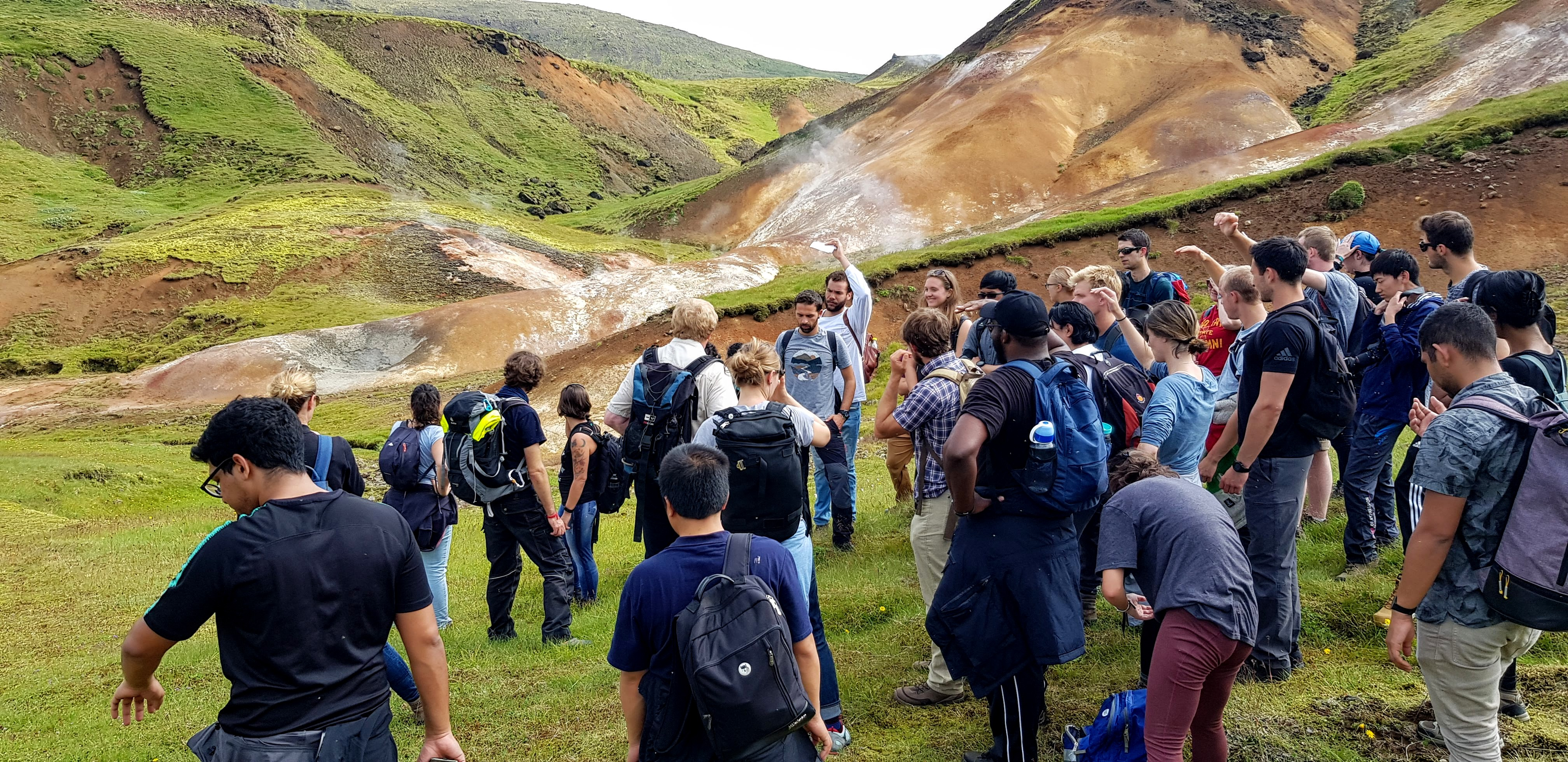
ISE Field Trip near Grensdalur Volcano

== See also ==
- Reykjavik University
- Reykjavik Energy
- Iceland GeoSurvey
