= Klébergsskóli =

Location
- Kollagrund 2, IS-116; Reykjavík; Iceland
- Coordinates: 64°14′15″N 21°49′33″W

Information
- Established: 1929
- Age range: 6 - 16
- Slogan: Virðing Samvinna Metnaður
- Website: http://www.klebergsskoli.is

Klébergsskóli is an elementary school in Reykjavík, Iceland for pupils from the age of 6 until the age of 16, when they finish their elementary studies.

Klébergsskóli is located on Kjalarnes which is a suburb of Reykjavík and serves pupils from Kjalarnes and Kjós. It is the smallest elementary school in Reykjavík, with only around 150 pupils, in grades 1-10.

== History ==
Klébergsskóli was founded in 1929, making it the oldest primary school in Reykjavík still in existence, Austurbæjarskóli having opened one year later.

From 2000 to 2003, an award winning new building was constructed, combining the older buildings.
