= Icelandic Student Loan Fund =

The Icelandic Student Loan Fund (Icelandic: Lánasjóður íslenskra námsmanna or LÍN) is a government-funded and government-run student loan fund for Icelandic citizens. It provides loans for living expenses for up to seven years of university studies. Repayment of the loans is at below-market-rate interest, with a two-year grace period upon completion of studies.
