= Landakotsskóli =

Icelandic Private School

Coordinates: 64.1479°N 21.9496°W

The Landakot School
- Icelandic: Landakotsskóli

Information
- Established: 1896; 130 years ago
- Grades: K-10
- Age: 5 to 16
- Enrollment: c.200

The Landakot School (Icelandic: Landakotsskóli), established in 1896, is Iceland's oldest and longest-running private school, and one of the oldest running schools in Iceland of any type. Students attending the school range in age from 5–16 years old; in Iceland this is K-10th grade.

Located in central Reykjavík, Landakotsskóli is an independent, non-denominational day school. There are currently around 200 students in the school. The school admits students from all nationalities.

Landakotskóli follows the National Icelandic Curriculum with an emphasis on mathematics, languages, arts and an innovative art curriculum. The school's International Department follows the Cambridge Curriculum developed by the University of Cambridge.

== See also ==
- Education and science in Iceland
- Education in Iceland
- Iceland
