= List of universities in Iceland =

This is a list of universities in Iceland.

== Universities and colleges ==
There are seven universities in Iceland as defined by law. No distinction is made between research universities and other tertiary colleges. Both types are referred to as "háskóli" locally.

Institution	Foundation	Location	Type	Number of Students
Agricultural University of Iceland	2005	Hvanneyri	Public	
Bifröst University	1918	Bifröst	Private	~ 1,100
Hólar University College	1882	Hólar	Public	
Iceland University of the Arts	1998	Reykjavík	Private	~ 452 (2009)
Reykjavík University	1998	Reykjavík	Private	~ 3,200 (2012)
University of Akureyri	1987	Akureyri	Public	~ 1,400 (2007)
University of Iceland	1911	Reykjavík	Public	~ 14,000 (2010)

== Graduate schools ==
- Keilir
- REYST
- University Centre of the Westfjords
- United Nations University (selected programmes)

== Defunct institutions ==
- Iceland University of Education (Merged with the University of Iceland)
- RES – The School for Renewable Energy Science
- Technical University of Iceland (Merged with Reykjavík University)

== See also ==
- List of schools in Iceland
